= The Apprentice (British TV series) series 15 =

15th series of a British reality television series

The Apprentice
- Series 15
- Promo group shot of Alan Sugar standing before the candidates for series 15
- Starring: Alan Sugar; Karren Brady; Claude Littner
- No. of episodes: 12

Release
- Original network: BBC One
- Original release: 2 October – 18 December 2019

Series chronology
- ← Previous; Series 14 Next → Series 16

The fifteenth series of British reality television series The Apprentice (UK) was broadcast in the UK on BBC One, from 2 October to 18 December 2019. As with the previous series, the first task was conducted abroad, with the candidates travelling further afield than had been previously staged in the programme's history of business-related tasks held in other countries. In addition, the sister programme The Apprentice - You're Fired saw a change in the host before the series broadcast, with comedian Tom Allen overseeing interviews with candidates after their final appearance within this series. Alongside the standard twelve episodes, the series was preceded by the mini online episode "Meet the Candidates" on 24 September, with two specials aired alongside the series – "The Final Five" on 10 December, and "Why I Fired Them" on 18 December.

Sixteen candidates took part in the fifteenth series, with Carina Lepore becoming the overall winner. Excluding the specials, the series averaged around 7.17 million viewers during its broadcast.

== Series overview ==
Applications for the fifteenth series began in late November 2018, towards the end of the fourteenth series, with applicants assessed and interviewed by production staff between January and February 2019. Filming took place during Spring to early Summer that year, once the final line-up of sixteen participants had been finalised, with final editing completed before the programme's premiere episode was broadcast in mid-Autumn. The series maintained the changes to the format introduced in the previous series, though filming for the series involved travelling abroad to South Africa, the most distant place used for a production site in the programme's history. Both teams adopted names in the third task upon each having mixed genders, with the names Empower and Unison used for the rest of the contest. Of those who took part, Carina Lepore would become the eventual winner, going on to use her prize to set up an artisan bakehouse chain of retail units.

=== Candidates ===
| Candidate | Background | Age | Result |
|---|---|---|---|
| Carina Lepore | Artisan Bakery Owner | 30 | Winner |
| Scarlett Allen-Horton | Recruitment Company Owner | 32 | Runner-Up |
| Pamela Laird | Beauty Brand Owner | 29 | Fired after the interviews stage |
| Lewis Ellis | Digital Marketing Project Manager | 28 | Fired after the interviews stage |
| Lottie Lion | Librarian | 19 | Fired after the interviews stage |
| Dean Ahmad | Sports Management Agency Owner | 20 | Fired after the tenth task |
| Marianne Rawlins | Risk Management Consultancy Owner | 36 | Fired after the ninth task |
| Thomas Skinner | Pillow Company Owner | 28 | Fired after the ninth task |
| Ryan-Mark Parsons | Luxury Womenswear Consultant | 19 | Fired after the eighth task |
| Jemelin Artigas | Network Marketing Consultant | 34 | Fired after the seventh task |
| Iasha Masood | Account Manager | 27 | Fired after the sixth task |
| Riyonn Farsad | Events Manager | 30 | Fired after the fifth task |
| Lubna Farhan | Finance Manager | 33 | Fired after the fourth task |
| Souleyman Bah | Paralympic Athlete and Motivational Speaker | 20 | Fired after the third task |
| Kenna Ngoma | Ice-Cream Company Owner | 24 | Fired after the second task |
| Shahin Hassan | Chartered Engineer | 36 | Fired after the first task |

=== Performance chart ===
| Candidate | Task Number | | | | | | | | | | | |
| Candidate | 1 | 2 | 3 | 4 | 5 | 6 | 7 | 8 | 9 | 10 | 11 | 12 |
|---|---|---|---|---|---|---|---|---|---|---|---|---|
| Carina | IN | WIN | IN | IN | LOSS | WIN | IN | IN | IN | WIN | IN | HIRED |
| Scarlett | WIN | IN | LOSS | LOSS | IN | LOSE | IN | IN | IN | IN | IN | RUNNER-UP |
| Pamela | IN | IN | WIN | IN | LOSS | IN | LOSS | LOSS | BR | LOSE | FIRED | |
| Lewis | LOSE | LOSS | IN | IN | LOSS | IN | IN | LOSS | LOSE | BR | FIRED | |
| Lottie | IN | IN | BR | LOSS | IN | BR | IN | WIN | IN | IN | FIRED | |
| Dean | BR | BR | IN | IN | IN | BR | WIN | IN | WIN | FIRED | | |
| Marianne | IN | IN | LOSS | BR | WIN | LOSS | LOSE | BR | FIRED | | | |
| Thomas | LOSS | LOSS | LOSS | LOSE | IN | LOSS | LOSS | BR | FIRED | | | |
| Ryan-Mark | LOSS | BR | IN | IN | BR | IN | BR | FIRED | | | | |
| Jemelin | IN | IN | IN | IN | LOSE | IN | FIRED | | | | | |
| Iasha | IN | IN | IN | WIN | IN | FIRED | | | | | | |
| Riyonn | LOSS | LOSS | LOSE | LOSS | FIRED | | | | | | | |
| Lubna | IN | IN | LOSS | FIRED | | | | | | | | |
| Souleyman | LOSS | LOSS | FIRED | | | | | | | | | |
| Kenna | LOSS | FIRED | | | | | | | | | | |
| Shahin | FIRED | | | | | | | | | | | |

Key:

HIRED The candidate won this series of The Apprentice.
RUNNER-UP The candidate was the runner-up.
WIN The candidate won as project manager on their team, for this task.
LOSE The candidate lost as project manager on their team, for this task.
IN The candidate was on the winning team for this task / they passed the Interviews stage.
LOSS The candidate was on the losing team for this task.
BR The candidate was brought to the final boardroom for this task.
FIRED The candidate was fired in this task.
PM The candidate lost as project manager for this task and was fired.

== Episodes ==
| No. overall | No. in series | Title | Original release date | UK viewers (millions) |
|---|---|---|---|---|
| 197 | 1 | "South Africa" | 2 October 2019 | 7.43 |
Lord Sugar searches for a new business partner for 2019 amongst sixteen new candidates. In their first task, the teams are sent to Cape Town, South Africa to run bespoke tours at specific locations, making money from commissions against any refunds they have to make. The men focus on a safari tour, yet despite praise for its quality, the team are let down by a problematic member, worthless negotiations, poor time management and low commissions. The women focus on a wine tour, which proves successful due to strong negotiations and earning good commissions for the team, despite the poor quality of the tour and rushed last-minute sales. The men face the boardroom after they make less money on the task. Of the final three, Shahin Hassan becomes the first to be fired for non-existent sales, sabotaging negotiations and his questionable contributions to the task.
| 198 | 2 | "Ice Lollies" | 9 October 2019 | 7.21 |
The candidates find themselves tasked with manufacturing their own ice lollies, selling a unique product for a corporate client, and a different range for the general public. The men opt for lavender ice lollies for the public that sell well, yet their decision for coconut milk and raspberry ice lollies fail to sell, due to their client finding them unappealing, alongside poor negotiations conducted by a problematic member on the client sub-team. The women opt for cherry cola and liquorice ice lollies for the public, and grape, edible flowers and rosemary ice lollies for their client, yet despite the client's product being reduced in quantity and the poor handling of negotiations with them, the team sell well with both lollies. In the boardroom, sales and costs soon show that the women made more profit, leaving the men facing questions on the crucial mistakes with their client's order. Amongst the losing team, Lord Sugar dismisses Kenna Ngoma for his weak leadership, poor decisions, and the flawed design of the corporate lolly.
| 199 | 3 | "Toys" | 16 October 2019 | 7.36 |
The teams are tasked by Lord Sugar to create a new toy for 6 to 8-year-olds, in which they must pitch their concepts, complete with brand name and online viral video promotion, to leading names within the toy industry to secure orders. Empower focus on a unicorn toy with slime under the brand of "Slime Kingdom", which despite some mixed feedback on its over-used concept design and the chosen brand name, is presented with a well-made viral video that is well received by one retailer. Unison focus on a talking turtle toy that can be attached to a glove and speak several positive phrases under the brand of "Animal Squad", but fails to secure orders primarily due to the concept targeting the wrong age group. In the boardroom, Empower win by securing orders, leaving Unison to face severe scrutiny over their flawed concept. Amongst the losing team, Souleyman Bah is dismissed for his overall negativity in the task, lack of contributions, and failing to provide solutions to the flaws in the concept.
| 200 | 4 | "Electric Bikes" | 23 October 2019 | 7.42 |
Transportation is the theme of the next task, with teams aiming to create a new type of electric bike to sell to retailers at their own launch event – half of each team will design the product, while the other half decide on an accessory to sell and marketing material for the event. Empower focus on a bike branded "Aphrodite" aimed at female bikers, and selling bike helmets with built-in front and rear LED lights at their launch event, managing good sales despite a difficult project manager and some minor criticism of their concept. Unison focus on a bike branded "E-Fit" aimed at mature riders, and selling bicycle Lycra suits at their launch event, yet the design receives negative feedback from market research and event attendees, with sales hampered by a problematic member and the team's choice of accessory. Empower secure the most sales from their product, leaving Unison to face the boardroom over their performance. Of the final three, Lubna Farhan is fired for her lack of contributions within the previous four tasks. Following the firing, Lord Sugar visits the candidates' house, to inform them of the next task.
| 201 | 5 | "Oxford and Cambridge Discount Buying" | 30 October 2019 | 7.39 |
Teams find themselves divided into two groups - one group to Oxford and the other to Cambridge - to seek out nine items that are associated with their respective city and negotiate good discounts on each purchase. Empower manage to secure seven items, but fail to negotiate good prices on most of the items and struggled with a lack of proper decision making and strategy within the team. Unison manage to secure eight items, thanks to strong negotiators, proper identification of items and an efficient strategy to acquire each purchase. In the boardroom, Unison's costs after fines are lower than those of Empower, leaving their rivals facing Lord Sugar's scrutiny in the boardroom. Of the final three, despite notable negative points pointed out for each member, Riyonn Farsad is dismissed for his overall track record and failure to demonstrate proper business skills.
| 202 | 6 | "Theme Park" | 6 November 2019 | 7.62 |
For their next task, the teams are challenged to design and promote a brand new rollercoaster attraction to a group of amusement park experts, complete with branding and 3D video presentation. Empower design a fantasy backwards-sitting ride, with a dream theme, called "Insomnia", providing a fairly well-received design concept and decent presentation, but receiving questions about the branding's logo and underwhelming scare factors in the coaster. Unison design a fast-paced, sci-fi styled ride called "The Final Loop", yet despite some good branding, they faced questions on its overall design and lack of prominent details about the coaster on promotional material. In the boardroom, Empower's design is chosen by the experts for its unique concept, leaving Unison to face serious questions on the flaws of their design. Of the final three, Iasha Masood is fired for her questionable contributions and negative feedback from her teammates.
| 203 | 7 | "Finland Advertising" | 13 November 2019 | 7.15 |
Promoting Finland as a Summer holiday location is the next task, in which teams must pitch their promotional concept to industry experts – half of each team stays in the UK to create the marketing campaign materials, while the other half head abroad to film a TV advert. Empower opt for promoting the country as a hotspot for the LGBT community, but fail to use a storyboard for their TV advert, while their concept faces questions over its misleading and questionable marketing material. Unison opt for promoting the country as an adventure destination, yet despite a lack of leadership, their concept is favoured by the experts from a good pitch and strong marketing campaign, despite some minor details. In the boardroom, Unison is deemed the better concept by Lord Sugar, leaving Empower to face questions over their flawed idea. Amongst the losing team, Jemelin Artigas is ejected from the process for producing a poor TV advert and failing to improve her performance over the last two tasks.
| 204 | 8 | "Steam Train" | 20 November 2019 | 6.60 |
Teams are tested on their organisation and hospitality skills by providing a service on one end of the Belmond British Pullman train, offering corporate customers food, drink and entertainment that is value for money. Empower offer a royalty-themed service, providing good entertainment and refreshments, yet fail to consider customers with allergies during preparations and cause delays in serving meals. Unison offer a circus-themed service, providing good meals, yet offer little entertainment, fail to fulfil promises on drinks, and struggle with a problematic leader. Despite complaints on their service requiring refunds to each team's client, Unison make a marginal win on the profit they achieve, leaving Empower questioned over their performance on the Pullman. Amongst the losing team, Lord Sugar fires Ryan-Mark Parsons for his constant excuses over his performance and declining appeal to be his business partner.
| 205 | 9 | "Music Managers" | 27 November 2019 | 6.83 |
Music is the theme of the next task, as Lord Sugar makes the candidates become music managers, promoting an artist with a new remix track at a showcase event and making sales from attendees along with a corporate client. Empower work with an R&B artist, but produce a remix that makes few sales at their event and is disliked by their client, despite securing a high commission for their sales from the artist. Unison work with an indie band, making reasonable sales at the event and their client, despite questions on their created remix and issues from a problematic member. Based on sales and negotiated commissions with their artist, Unison win from their negotiation skills and leave Empower facing scrutiny in the boardroom over their performance. Amongst the losing team, Thomas Skinner is dismissed for his mistakes and dismal track record in tasks, and Marianne Rawlins is fired for her weak management skills and lack of appeal to be a business partner.
| 206 | 10 | "Perfume" | 4 December 2019 | 6.68 |
Both teams find themselves creating their own fragrance, complete with unique bottle design, promotional material and brand, before pitching their concepts for sale to two major retailers. Empower create a perfume branded "Determined" for the female market, but struggle from a problematic member in presentations and poor decisions, while facing questions on the branding and bottle design. Unison create a perfume branded "Captivation" for the unisex market, which despite providing a good bottle design, faces concerns on the scent and branding. Based on order figures, Unison secure the most from one of the retailers they met, leaving Empower facing questions on their concept securing fewer from the other. Of the final three, Dean Ahmad is ejected from the process for his poor pitching skills in the task, and his deeply questionable contributions throughout the process.
| 207 | SP–1 | "The Final Five" | 10 December 2019 | N/A |
As this year's series of The Apprentice draws closer to its finale, this special episode takes a look at profiling the true story behind the five remaining candidates. Discussing their backgrounds, experiences, personality, and strengths and weaknesses, are a selection of each candidate's friends, family and colleagues, as well as Lord Sugar's aides, Claude Littner and Karren Brady.
| 208 | 11 | "Interviews" | 11 December 2019 | 7.64 |
After facing ten tasks as teams, the remaining five candidates now compete as individuals in their next task – a series of tough, gruelling interviews with four of Lord Sugar's most trusted associates. Each member faces scrutiny over their backgrounds, work experience, track record, and business proposals when questioned by interviewers. Feedback to Lord Sugar, alongside observations by his aides, leads him to firing Lottie Lion for offering an unrealistic and unappealing proposal, Lewis Ellis for lacking the experience and expertise for his proposal, and Pamela Laird for offering a questionable proposal with no unique products. Of the remaining two, Carina Lepore is commended for an appealing plan and credible character, while Scarlett Allen-Horton is considered a gamble, commended for her good reputation but with concerns over her lack of costing information with her plan.
| 209 | SP–2 | "Why I Fired Them" | 18 December 2019 | N/A |
As the final looms, Lord Sugar takes a look back to the tasks he set for this year's series of The Apprentice. From creating a safari tour in South Africa and electric bikes, to running a dining car service and promoting Finland as a Summer holiday destination, he relives all of the mistakes, doomed decisions, and other notable events that occurred during the process, and provides his reasons behind each firing he made amongst the candidates for the process, which ultimately whittle them down to the two finalists for this series.
| 210 | 12 | "The Final" | 18 December 2019 | 6.76 |
After facing a multitude of business tasks and a tough interview, the two finalists, aided by old colleagues, face the task of presenting their business proposal to an audience of business and industry experts, detailing key areas in it – its name, its goals, its target market, and its business structure. Scarlett works to present her plan for an up-scale recruitment firm, receiving praise for a strong USP and business structure, yet faces concerns with the market she is entering. Carina works to present her plan for a chain of artisan bakehouses, receiving praise for her product and potential in her proposal's market, yet faces concerns on the scalability of her proposed business. Based on feedback from these presentations, Lord Sugar deems that Carina Lepore will be his business partner for 2019 for offering a lucrative proposal, leaving Scarlett Allen-Horton to become runner-up due to strong concerns on her proposal.

== Controversy ==
"Gandhi" comments

Following the broadcast of the second episode, a WhatsApp group used by the candidates to stay in contact was shut down. The action by producers was claimed by Kenna Ngoma, in an interview with Digital Spy, to be in response to a leaked message from the group made by Lottie Lion, in which she referenced Lubna Farhan as Gandhi. Her message led to several complaints against the programme over racism. However, Lion denied these were true and stated that her words had been "misinterpreted" and "taken out of context". The programme's staff gave no comment to the allegations, but did forward the matter to the BBC, who made clear that the behaviour of candidates who appear on the programme must be appropriate during and after filming, deeming that the comments by Lion on WhatsApp had been "wholly unacceptable" regardless of her excuse. After an investigation into further complaints by other candidates and her actions, both the BBC and the production staff made the decision to not have her appear in the final two episodes of You're Fired, after deciding her comments had been "unacceptable" on WhatsApp.

== Ratings ==
Official episode viewing figures are from BARB and includes viewers on all devices.

| Episode no. | Air date | 7 day viewers (millions) | 28 day viewers (millions) | BBC One weekly ranking |
|---|---|---|---|---|
| 1 | 2 October 2019 | 6.77 | 7.43 | 4 |
| 2 | 9 October 2019 | 6.69 | 7.21 | 4 |
| 3 | 16 October 2019 | 6.88 | 7.36 | 4 |
| 4 | 23 October 2019 | 6.98 | 7.42 | 4 |
| 5 | 30 October 2019 | 7.08 | 7.39 | 5 |
| 6 | 6 November 2019 | 7.30 | 7.62 | 5 |
| 7 | 13 November 2019 | 6.87 | 7.15 | 6 |
| 8 | 20 November 2019 | 6.22 | 6.60 | 7 |
| 9 | 27 November 2019 | 6.46 | 6.83 | 6 |
| 10 | 4 December 2019 | 6.28 | 6.68 | 6 |
| 11 | 11 December 2019 | 7.43 | 7.64 | 3 |
| 12 | 18 December 2019 | 6.54 | 6.76 | 3 |
