= The Apprentice (British TV series) series 17 =

The Apprentice
- Series 17
- Starring: Alan Sugar; Karren Brady; Tim Campbell; Claude Littner
- No. of episodes: 12

Release
- Original network: BBC One
- Original release: 5 January – 23 March 2023

Series chronology
- ← Previous; Series 16 Next → Series 18

The seventeenth series of British reality television series The Apprentice (UK) premiered on 5 January 2023 in the UK on BBC One. Karren Brady and Tim Campbell returned as Alan Sugar's aides, the latter of whom joined the show on a permanent basis, after stepping in for Claude Littner in the previous series. Littner also returned to the series but in a "reduced role" and only appeared in two episodes. Eighteen candidates competed in the series, the highest number of candidates since the thirteenth series. The first trailer for the series was released on 20 December 2022. The candidates were revealed on 3 January 2023, two days before the show's premiere.

The series is the first to feature two candidates leaving the competition of their own accord. Shannon Martin resigned before the results were revealed in Episode 2, while Reece Donnelly left at some point during Episode 6. This is the second consecutive series with only women present at the interviews stage, and the fourth consecutive series with two women in the final.

The series concluded on 23 March 2023, and it was announced that Marnie Swindells was the winner of Series 17, with Rochelle Anthony as the runner-up.

== Series overview ==
=== Candidates ===
Candidate	Background	Age	Result
Marnie Swindells	Court advocate	28	Winner
Rochelle Raye Anthony	Hair salon and academy owner	35	Runner-up
Megan Hornby	Sweet shop and café owner	25	Fired in the interviews stage
Dani Donovan	Hair salon owner	25	Fired in the interviews stage
Victoria Goulbourne	Online sweet business owner	28	Fired in the interviews stage
Simba Rwambiwa	Senior sales representative	26	Fired in the tenth task
Avi Sharma	City banker	24	Fired in the ninth task
Bradley Johnson	Construction company director	28	Fired in the ninth task
Mark Moseley	Pest control company owner	39	Fired in the eighth task
Sohail Chowdhary	Martial arts school owner	27	Fired in the seventh task
Joseph Phillips	South Africa safari guide	26	Fired in the sixth task
Reece Donnelly	Theatre school owner	25	Withdrew during the sixth task
Shazia Hussain	Technology recruiter	40	Fired in the fifth task
Denisha Kaur Bharj	Financial controller	29	Fired in the fourth task
Gregory Ebbs	Online antiques marketplace owner	26	Fired in the third task
Kevin D'Arcy	Accountant	32	Fired in the second task
Shannon Martin	Bridal boutique owner	34	Withdrew after the second task
Emma Browne	Senior account executive	26	Fired in the first task

=== Performance chart ===
Candidate	Task Number											
Candidate	1	2	3	4	5	6	7	8	9	10	11	12
Marnie	BR	IN	IN	LOSS	WIN	IN	BR	IN	BR	IN	IN	HIRED
Rochelle	LOSS	IN	LOSS	IN	LOSS	LOSE	LOSS	IN	BR	IN	IN	RUNNER-UP
Megan	LOSS	WIN	LOSS	LOSS	IN	IN	IN	LOSS	IN	LOSE	FIRED	
Dani	LOSS	IN	IN	IN	LOSS	LOSS	WIN	BR	WIN	BR	FIRED	
Victoria	LOSE	IN	LOSS	LOSS	IN	WIN	IN	BR	IN	WIN	FIRED	
Simba	IN	LOSS	LOSS	WIN	LOSS	BR	IN	LOSS	IN	FIRED		
Avi	IN	BR	WIN	IN	BR	LOSS	LOSS	WIN	FIRED			
Bradley	IN	LOSE	IN	IN	LOSE	LOSS	BR	IN	FIRED			
Mark	IN	LOSS	IN	BR	IN	IN	IN	FIRED				
Sohail	IN	LOSS	IN	LOSS	IN	IN	FIRED					
Joseph	WIN	LOSS	LOSS	IN	LOSS	FIRED						
Reece	IN	LOSS	LOSE	BR	IN	LEFT						
Shazia	LOSS	IN	IN	IN	FIRED							
Denisha	LOSS	IN	BR	FIRED								
Gregory	IN	LOSS	FIRED									
Kevin	IN	FIRED										
Shannon	LOSS	LEFT										
Emma	FIRED											

Key:

HIRED The candidate won this series of The Apprentice.
RUNNER-UP The candidate was the runner-up.
WIN The candidate won as project manager on their team, for this task.
LOSE The candidate lost as project manager on their team, for this task.
IN The candidate was on the winning team for this task / they passed the Interviews stage.
LOSS The candidate was on the losing team for this task.
BR The candidate was brought to the final boardroom for this task.
FIRED The candidate was fired in this task.
PM The candidate lost as project manager for this task and was fired.
LEFT The candidate left the process.

== Episodes ==
No. overall	No. in series	Title	Original release date	UK viewers (millions)
225	1	"Antigua Tourism"	5 January 2023	7.37
Lord Sugar searches for a new business partner for 2023 amongst sixteen new candidates. In their first task, the teams are sent to the Caribbean island of Antigua to sell and run bespoke tours making money from commissions against any refunds they have to make. The men choose to run a historical and cultural tour of the island, selling out the tour, offering a high-quality tour and making good commission money despite some issues with pricing and negotiations. The women offer a catamaran experience yet struggle to find customers due to poor location and team in-fighting. In the boardroom, the men are revealed to have made a larger profit leaving the women to face questions over their mistakes. Of the final three, Emma Browne is the first to be fired by Sugar for her lack of co-operation with the rest of the team.
226	2	"Bao Buns"	12 January 2023	7.59
The candidates are summoned to Hutong at the Shard in Central London. Lord Sugar reveals that they will be manufacturing savory bao buns to punt to the public and a bespoke sweet bun to sell to a corporate client, with the team who secures the biggest overall profit winning. The women sell fish savory buns to the public, and a chocolate meringue sweet one to their corporate client, along with upselling garnishes with their savory buns, achieving good sales of the former despite issues with ordering ingredients, and receiving a lower price for their corporate order. The men sell chicken buns to the public, and created a fruit and marshmallow sweet bun for their corporate customer, but suffered issues in manufacturing, not selling all their stock, and a failure to upsell the garnishes along with a questionable pricing policy. In the boardroom, the women are revealed to have made a bigger profit - although they are left surprised when Shannon Martin chooses to leave the process before the results are announced owing to her concerns over the environment, leaving the men to be grilled over their errors. Of the final three, Kevin D'Arcy is dismissed over his mismanagement of the sub-team and coming up with a flawed pricing strategy for the savory buns. Note: Beginning with this task, Tim Campbell would be stepping in for Claude for the remainder of the process due to health concerns.
227	3	"Cartoons"	19 January 2023	6.84
The candidates are summoned to London's Regent Street Cinema, where Lord Sugar reveals that they will be producing a new preschool cartoon aimed at two-to-four-year-olds to pitch to industry experts. Affinity create a cartoon about a nervous giraffe who uses her height to help in unique situations, but face concerns about the giraffe’s name and design. Apex produce a cartoon about the relationship between a boy and a girl who uses a wheelchair, but face concerns over its message and incomplete design. Ultimately, the experts pick Affinity’s cartoon over Apex’s, leaving the latter facing questions over their concept. Out of the final three, Lord Sugar fires Gregory Ebbs for making no contributions to the task, despite performing well previously. Following the firing, Lord Sugar visits the candidates' house, to inform them of the next task. Note: As it was created to tie in with the BBC’s centenary, this episode features a cartoon with the voices of Craig Revel Horwood, Motsi Mabuse, Jessie Wallace and David Jason.
228	4	"Brighton Discount Buying"	26 January 2023	6.96
Lord Sugar sends the teams to Brighton and Hove to purchase nine items associated with the city for the lowest prices. Between incorrect identification of items, poor strategy and misunderstandings in negotiations, Affinity correctly secure six items while Apex correctly secure five. In the end, Affinity’s costs after fines are lower than Apex’s, leaving the latter facing scrutiny over their failure. Out of the final three, Denisha Kaur Bharj is dismissed for demonstrating poor logistic and leadership skills.
229	5	"Electric Motorbike Advertising"	2 February 2023	6.58
The teams are summoned to Imperial College, where they are asked to brand a new electric motorcycle - they must create a name, a logo, a television advertisement and a digital billboard, before pitching their ideas to industry experts. Affinity market their bike towards younger bikers, but the original ideas for the concept are ignored and they face criticism for their brand name, logo and campaign. Apex market their bike towards owners of conventional petrol powered motorcycles, but face issues with the content of their advert, their message and their logo. After feedback from the experts, Lord Sugar selects Apex as the winners, leaving Affinity facing questions over their flawed design. Of the final three, Shazia Hussain is fired for making a variety of mistakes, including a failure to use her alleged skills in media design to her advantage and being instrumental in the creation of the poor branding.
230	6	"Dubai Corporate Hospitality"	9 February 2023	6.73
The teams fly out to Dubai from Heathrow to run corporate away days with a teambuilding activity, although Reece Donnelly does not take part and ultimately leaves the process. Affinity focus on a camel tour with coffee making as the teambuilding exercise, attempting to making as much profit as possible, but face issues with dietary requirements, quality of service and are criticised for limiting the amount of liquid that their clientele can consume. Apex focus on the marina with jetskiing, a yacht ride and a DJ masterclass as the teambuilding course, but face issues with food delays, a sick team member and the amount of time the DJ is available. When the profits are revealed afterwards, it is announced that Affinity received smaller overall profits and a larger refund compared to Apex's, resulting in them facing questions over their strategy. Out of the final three, Joseph Philips is ejected from the process for providing poor food service and playing a role in the decision to limit the amount of drinks available to the clientele.
231	7	"Children's Lunchbox and App"	16 February 2023	6.27
The candidates find themselves designing a new children's lunchbox for six-to-eight-year-olds, along with an accompanying app intended to encourage healthy eating, before pitching it to retailers. Affinity design a pirate-themed, treasure chest-shaped lunchbox and app with an animated pirate mascot, but face issues with an incomplete app design, a bland box colour and a poorly-chosen brand name, which along with constant talk of changes in the pitches leads to the retailers issuing no orders. Apex design a leaf-shaped lunchbox and app with a caterpillar mascot, securing some orders despite concerns that the branding is potentially targeting the wrong age group and that the lunchbox's shape and size makes it impractical. After the results are revealed, Lord Sugar puts Affinity to task for their failure. Out of the final three, Sohail Chowdhary is fired for mismanaging his team and standing by a failed product.
232	8	"Immersive Event"	23 February 2023	6.01
Running immersive experiences in Shropshire with food and entertainment is the theme of this task. Affinity run a Victorian experience in Blists Hill, serving fidget pie and presenting a contortionist, providing a memorable experience despite serving the wrong pie to a customer. Apex run an experience at Shrewsbury Prison involving the guests being placed in the role of prisoners, serving gourmet burgers and presenting a magician, but face issues with costs and fail to sell tickets to the public, while those who do get tickets do not know about the immersive element of the experience, leading to confusion. Afterwards, Apex's profit is revealed to be lower than Affinity's, leading to them facing questions over their experience. Out of the final three, Mark Moseley is dismissed over the team's failure to control their costs and his own failure to sell the immersive experience properly.
233	9	"Male Beauty"	2 March 2023	6.22
The candidates become cosmetic designers for this task, where they must create a male skincare brand and host a launch event for it where they must sell it to industry buyers. Affinity attempt to create an exfoliant with a snake-themed bottle for the 30's-40's market, but their creation is seen as slimy and the branding is dubbed childish, while potential buyers are put off by the fact that the product stains the skin of the user. Apex create a moisturising cream for older males, which is seen as unoriginal and comes with a star-shaped box that draws comparisons to scented candles. Apex win over Affinity by securing orders, leading to Bradley Johnson being fired immediately for being instrumental in creating a poor branding, for touting changes to the product too many times in the pitches and for losing three times as project manager. Out of the remainder of Affinity, Avi Sharma is dismissed for his contribution to the failed formula and his questionable track record.
234	10	"Dog Food"	9 March 2023	5.93
The candidates are asked to create a new brand of dog food with a signature dish, before pitching it to major retailers. Affinity create a gourmet brand with lamb as the signature flavour, but face issues with the food's protein content, name, tagline and packaging. Apex create an insect-based brand with a signature dish that is based on a 'dog's dinner of a Sunday roast', but the food's protein content is thought to be too low, it is found to have no texture, and it does not go down well with a focus group. One of the retailers places an order for Affinity's food. With no orders for their food, Apex are made to face questions over their failure. In the end, Simba Rwambiwa is ejected from the process for contributing to the poor branding, having a questionable track record, and being perceived as not being someone who is listened to by others.
235	11	"Interviews"	16 March 2023	6.28
After facing ten tasks as teams, the remaining five candidates now compete as individuals in their next task – a series of tough, grueling interviews with some of Lord Sugar’s closest associates: Karren Brady, Claude Littner, Mike Soutar and Linda Plant. Each member faces scrutiny over their backgrounds, work experience, track record, and business proposals when questioned by interviewers. Feedback to Lord Sugar, alongside observations by his aides, leads him to firing Victoria Goulbourne over having a business plan without a unique selling point, Dani Donovan for offering a poor business plan and Megan Hornby for a lack of business experience. As for the remaining two, Marnie Swindells and Rochelle Raye Anthony are both praised for their capabilities as candidates and businesspeople.
236	12	"Finals"	23 March 2023	5.73
After facing a multitude of business tasks and a tough interview, the two finalists, aided by old colleagues, must create new brands for their proposed businesses, as well as a television advert, a digital billboard and a metaverse, before pitching their ideas to Lord Sugar at a gala event attended by industry experts. Marnie works to open a boxing gym in the centre of London; her ambition is noted as positive despite the fact she is planning to enter a crowded market. Rochelle works to open new locations for her hair salon and hairdressing academy; she faces scaleability concerns. Based on feedback from these presentations, Lord Sugar declares Marnie Swindells as his new business partner for 2023, with her determination, track record and his own risk-taking being deciding factors despite her lack of experience in running a business, leaving Rochelle Raye Anthony as runner-up due to concerns over the scaleability and narrow target market of her proposal.

== Controversies ==
=== Accusations of bullying by candidates ===
Candidate Shazia Hussain allegedly made a complaint to the BBC claiming that fellow candidate Mark Moseley racially abused her. It was claimed that the incident was caught on camera with the contestants wearing microphones but the BBC chose not to include it in the final broadcast of the programme. A BBC spokesperson said that after Hussain had made a complaint, "an investigation was conducted and she received in-person support from senior members of the production team".

=== Interviews stage bullying allegations ===
The interviews stage, where the final five candidates are grilled on their business plans, was accused by viewers of going beyond grilling into bullying and belittlement. Karren Brady's interviews with candidates Victoria Goulbourne and Dani Donovan brought both of them to tears. Brady called Victoria Goulbourne's business plan for her online sweet business as "crazy as it comes" and had "no depth or substance". Sarah Carson, culture editor at iNews, wrote on Twitter that "it is deeply unpleasant to watch Karren Brady bully or sneer her way through" the interviews such as "treat[ing] all the contestants with disgust". In an opinion piece for iNews, Emily Baker wrote that in contrast to previous years "this year's interviews felt different: more cruel, less substantial and, crucially, less fun than ever". She gave the examples of Linda Plant who recommended that Victoria Goulbourne return to her previous job as an airline stewardess and how Plant questioned Dani Donovan's use of mermaid branding in her hair extensions brand Mermane because mermaids do not actually exist.

Lord Sugar agreed with the allegations, calling the interview process for this season as 'hard to watch', and promised to tone it down in the next season. He has spoken to his advisors and the subsequent interview episodes will not be a repeat of the performance in this season.
