= Graft (rapper) =

British rapper

- Also known as: Graft
- Born: Jovanni Shemar Sterling; 27 May 1999 (age 27); Leeds, West Yorkshire, England.
- Genres: Rap
- Occupations: Footballer, Rapper
- Years active: 2015–present
- Website: www.iamgraft.uk

Jovanni Shemar Sterling (born 27 May 1999) known professionally as Graft, is a British rapper and former professional youth footballer, from Leeds, West Yorkshire, England.

== Early life ==
Graft was born in Gledhow, raised in Chapeltown, and later moved to Oakwood all of which are areas in the city of Leeds.

He first started making music as a 14 year old. His first rap freestyle video was released on Leeds-based YouTube channel FirstMediaTV in February 2015. In February 2016 he released his first music video "Chapters" also on FirstMediaTV. He's also done rap freestyles and music videos on other West Yorkshire YouTube channels such as; Bradford's KODH TV (King Of Da Hillz TV), Bradford's AIRES Films, Leeds' HomeGrownMedia (HGM) and Leeds' JDZmedia.

In May 2015, he joined the Leeds United F.C. under 18's youth academy, and previously captained the under 16's team. Leeds United are the team he supports. He then joined Rotherham United F.C. in July 2016, where he played for their B team and youth academy. On the 30th of June 2017 he was released by Rotherham United.

== Film and TV appearances ==
In October 2020 Graft appeared in series 2 of The Rap Game UK by BBC Three. The judges as usual were DJ Target, and Krept and Konan. The celebrity mentors were Aitch, Ashleigh Jade, Ayishat Akanbi, D Double E, Deno, The Fanatix, JME, Kenny Allstar, Ms Banks, Rapman, Tiffany Calver, Wretch 32, Young T and Bugsey, and Yungen. And Graft's rival contestants were D Live, DDroid, Lesia, Micahh, Shogun and Zones.

In May 2021 he appeared in an episode of BBC Three's MOTDx with Aston Villa footballer Kortney Hause.

In October 2021 he appeared in 5 episodes of E4's Celebrity Ghost Trip. Graft was paired with The Apprentice series 14 winner Sian Gabbidon who is also from Leeds.

== Music career ==
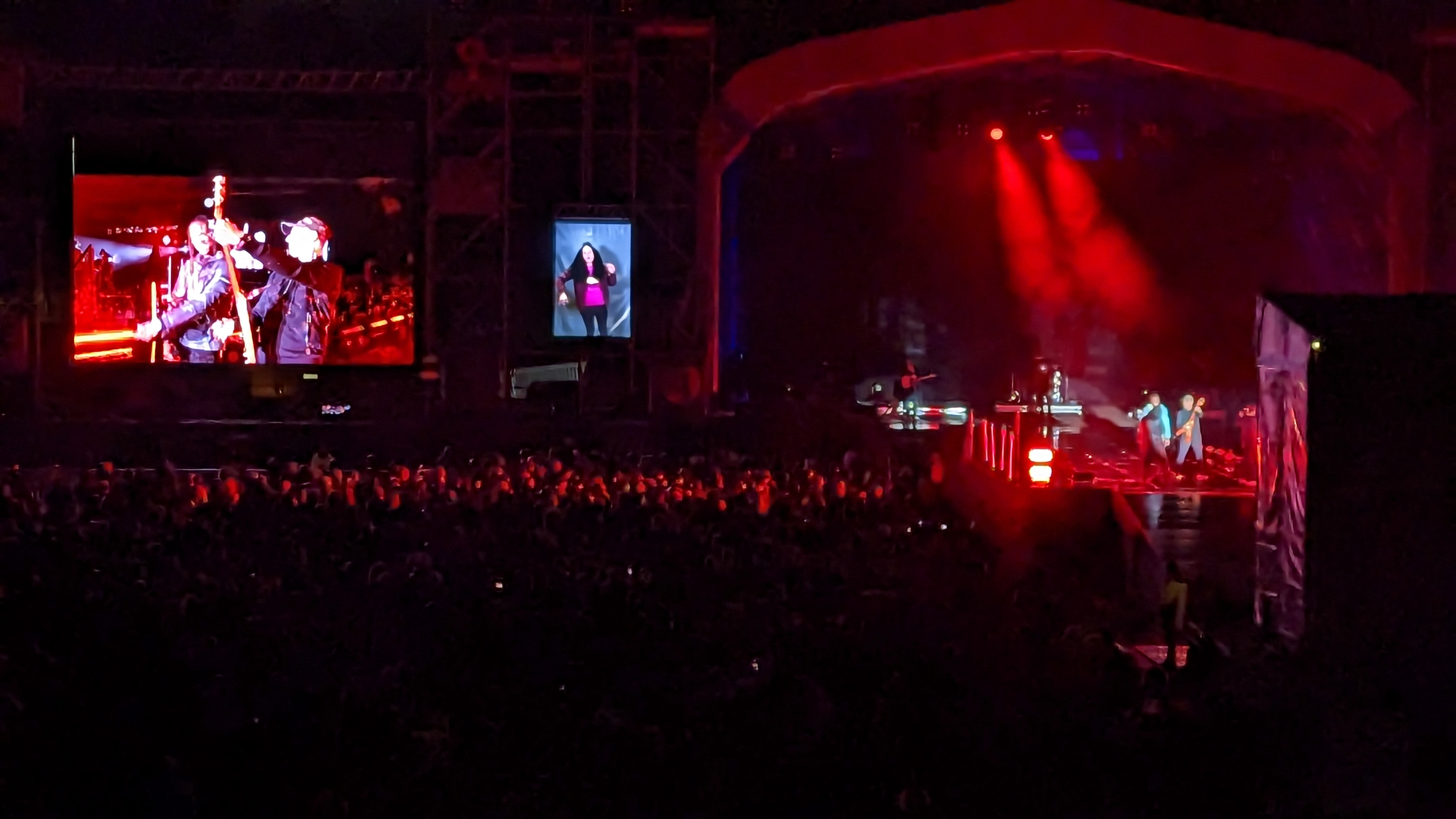
Graft & Aziz Ibrahim performing at The Awakening - Leeds 2023

Graft along with his fellow The Rap Game UK contestants, released the single "Dirty" as part of one of their challenges in the show. The music video was released on GRM Daily and BBC Three's YouTube channels in November 2020.

He released his long anticipated, The Rap Game UK winning single "You Know What" in July 2021, with the music video being posted on GRM Daily. It was released by Krept and Konan's record label Play Dirty, as part of the prize for winning The Rap Game UK. It featured cameos from The Rap Game UK series 1 runner up FOS, fashion designer Sian Gabbidon, former IBF featherweight world boxing champion Josh Warrington, along with Krept and Konan themselves. It was filmed all across the city of Leeds, and featured local landmarks Leeds Kirkgate Market, Leeds Corn Exchange, and Elland Road.

He's supported the likes of Wiley, Bugzy Malone, Tion Wayne, and Nadia Rose on tour.

== Awards and nominations ==
In October 2018 Graft was nominated in the Best Upcoming Artist category, at The Yorkshire Entertainment Award's 2018, which he went on to win.

He was also co-nominated in the Best Video category, at The Yorkshire Entertainment Award's 2018, along with Bradford's Leejay and Huddersfield's Prince Omari, for their music video "Can't Hear Us" which they also won. Graft, Leejay, and Prince Omari, wore Leeds United F.C., Bradford City A.F.C. and Huddersfield Town A.F.C. shirts respectively, to represent their home towns and cities. The video was filmed at the football club stadiums Elland Road, Valley Parade and Kirklees Stadium.

In February 2019 he won the 2018 MOBO UnSung Award, with Fred Fredas and Ike Chuks finishing as runners up.

In November 2020 he won The Rap Game UK, with Lesia and Zones finishing as runners up.
