= Bushra Shaikh =

British television personality (born 1982)

- Born: 1982 (age 43–44)
- Citizenship: British
- Education: University of the Arts London (BA)

Bushra Shaikh (born 1982) is a Pakistani media personality, broadcaster, and activist. The founder of activist group Run Racism Out, she first became well-known for her appearance on The Apprentice series 13, where she finished 9th. More recently, she has become more outspoken, particularly in regards to the Gaza war, and received large amounts of criticism on her statements, particularly about Jews.

== Professional career ==
=== The Apprentice ===
Shaikh, who at the time was a clothing company owner from Surrey, competed on series 13 of The Apprentice. She was eliminated in 9th, after an awkward sales pitch failed to convince host Alan Sugar.

=== Iran tours ===
Fact-checking platform Factnameh found that Shaikh participated in two press tours organised by the Iranian state-owned IRIB World Service radio network and met with high-ranking Iranian officials. Since then she played a "highly active role in reproducing the [Iranian] government’s narrative". According to The Jerusalem Post's reporting and Guardian's coverage security analysts had identified Shaikh as an example of Iran's "access diplomacy" strategy of granting foreign influencers privileged access to help shape their narrative during domestic unrest. The trips drew criticism from Iranian digital rights activists who said that Shaikh had internet access and common Iranians did not.

=== Anti-semitism ===
As Shaikh was selected for the reality TV series Go Back to Where You Came From, past tweets from Shaikh were unearthed, which included statements which called European Jews "the biggest charlatans on the planet" and "a bunch of lying scumbags". After a widespread backlash to Shaikh's statements, Channel 4 distanced themselves from Shaikh's tweets. Other statements by Shaikh have been similarly condemned.

== Personal life ==
Shaikh is of Pakistani descent. She is a mother and has stated that she believes women should choose to have children first and a career later in life.
