= The Apprentice (British TV series) series 14 =

14th series of a British reality television series

The Apprentice
- Series 14
- Promo group shot of Alan Sugar standing before the candidates for series 14
- Starring: Alan Sugar; Karren Brady; Claude Littner
- No. of episodes: 12

Release
- Original network: BBC One
- Original release: 3 October – 16 December 2018

Series chronology
- ← Previous; Series 13 Next → Series 15

The fourteenth series of British reality television series The Apprentice (UK) was broadcast in the UK on BBC One, from 3 October to 16 December 2018. This series saw a number of subtle changes, including the candidates going abroad to conduct their first task, and team names not being created until the start of the third task. Alongside the standard twelve episodes, the series was preceded by the mini online episode "Meet the Candidates" on 25 September, with two specials aired alongside the series – The Final Five on 11 December, and Why I Fired Them on 13 December.

Overall, sixteen candidates took part, with Sian Gabbidon becoming the overall winner. Excluding the specials, the series averaged around 7.32 million viewers during its broadcast.

== Series overview ==
Applications for the fourteenth series opened in late November 2017, with filming taking place during spring to early summer 2018.

Team names were decided during the third episode, with Typhoon and Collaborative chosen. Of those who took part, Sian Gabbidon would become the eventual winner, going on to use her prize to produce an affordable luxury swimwear range.

=== Candidates ===
Candidate	Background	Age	Result
Sian Gabbidon	Swimwear Brand Owner	25	Winner
Camilla Ainsworth	Nut Milk Brand Owner	22	Runner-up
Daniel Elahi	Lifestyle Brand Owner	28	Fired after the interviews stage
Khadija Kalifa	Eco Cleaning Company Owner	28	Fired after the interviews stage
Sabrina Stocker	Tennis Events Company Owner	22	Fired after the interviews stage
Sarah Ann Magson	Solicitor	37	Fired after the tenth task
Jackie Fast	Sponsorship Consultant	34	Fired after the ninth task
Tom Bunday	Tree Surgery Firm Owner	28	Fired after the ninth task
Jasmine Kundra	Learning and Development Manager	34	Fired after the eighth task
Kayode Damali	Professional Speaker	26	Fired after the seventh task
Kurran Pooni	Law Graduate	22	Fired after the sixth task
Rick Monk	Quality Controller	33	Fired after the fifth task
Alex Finn	IT Specialist	21	Fired after the fourth task
Frank Brooks	Senior Marketing Manager	27	Fired after the third task
David Alden	Tax Advisor	32	Fired after the second task
Sarah Byrne	Children’s Acting Academy Owner	29	Fired after the first task

=== Performance chart ===
Candidate	Task Number											
Candidate	1	2	3	4	5	6	7	8	9	10	11	12
Sian	LOSS	IN	IN	BR	WIN	IN	LOSS	LOSS	WIN	IN	IN	HIRED
Camilla	LOSS	IN	WIN	LOSS	IN	BR	IN	IN	BR	LOSE	IN	RUNNER-UP
Daniel	IN	LOSS	IN	LOSS	IN	LOSS	WIN	IN	IN	BR	FIRED	
Khadija	LOSS	WIN	IN	LOSS	IN	BR	IN	IN	BR	IN	FIRED	
Sabrina	LOSS	IN	IN	LOSE	IN	WIN	BR	BR	IN	WIN	FIRED	
Sarah Ann	LOSS	IN	LOSS	WIN	BR	IN	IN	IN	IN	FIRED		
Jackie	BR	IN	LOSS	IN	LOSE	LOSS	IN	WIN	FIRED			
Tom	IN	LOSS	LOSE	IN	IN	IN	LOSE	BR	FIRED			
Jasmine	LOSE	IN	BR	IN	LOSS	IN	LOSS	FIRED				
Kayode	WIN	LOSS	IN	IN	BR	IN	FIRED					
Kurran	IN	BR	LOSS	IN	BR	FIRED						
Rick	IN	LOSS	LOSS	IN	FIRED							
Alex	IN	LOSS	IN	FIRED								
Frank	IN	LOSE	FIRED									
David	IN	FIRED										
Sarah	FIRED											

Key:

HIRED The candidate won this series of The Apprentice.
RUNNER-UP The candidate was the runner-up.
WIN The candidate won as project manager on their team, for this task.
LOSE The candidate lost as project manager on their team, for this task.
IN The candidate was on the winning team for this task / they passed the Interviews stage.
LOSS The candidate was on the losing team for this task.
BR The candidate was brought to the final boardroom for this task.
FIRED The candidate was fired in this task.
FIRED The candidate lost as project manager for this task and was fired.

== Episodes ==
No. overall	No. in series	Title	Original release date	UK viewers (millions)
183	1	"Malta"	3 October 2018	7.32
The first task begins with a twist – sent to Malta, both teams must each find a set of nine items celebrating the island nation's culture, getting each purchase at a bargain price. The men manage to secure five items through good research, yet struggle with a poor strategy and communication, and secure two additional items that fail to match required specifications. The women manage to secure five items, but suffer from poor communication and a wild sourcing strategy, which unnecessarily complicates their efforts. The men win the task, having tactfully controlled their costs, leaving the women to face questions over their chaotic performance and lack of negotiating skills. Of the final three, Sarah Byrne becomes the first person to be fired for being argumentative and problematic to work with.
184	2	"Comics"	10 October 2018	7.80
Each team is tasked with creating a brand new comic for 8–12 year olds, complete with an augmented reality cover, and pitching their creation to three major retailers. The women focus on an educational comic concept, securing a large order with a risky gamble, despite issues facing questions over their comic's target market and the inclusion of grammatical errors. The men conceive of a superhero comic, but receive few orders due to issues from a weak team leader, lack of team cohesion on their creation, and a flawed decision during their pitches. The women win the task, leaving the men to face questions in the boardroom over their flawed comic. Of the final three, David Alden is fired for demonstrating a lack of business acumen and his poor contributions in the task.
185	3	"Doughnuts"	17 October 2018	7.60
The teams are tasked with creating luxury doughnuts, each coming up with one variety for a corporate client, and two others for passing trade. Typhoon opt for creating simple British-themed flavours for their doughnuts, making good sales with the public due to strong salespeople and well-received creations, yet receive less from their client over criticism of their product's appearance. Collaborative opt for using sweet and savoury flavours for their doughnuts and, despite the pleasant presentation of their varieties, their client pays little for the product, while the team face issues from a weak team leader and an inedible flavour for passing trade. Typhoon win the task despite Lord Sugar disapproving of their doughnuts' appearance, while he questions Collaborative over the flaws in their performance. Of the losing team, Frank Brooks is fired over questions about his performance, emotions, and behaviour in tasks.
186	4	"Bodybuilding Expo"	24 October 2018	7.43
Heading for a bodybuilding expo in Birmingham, both teams each must select a high-end product and fitness service, before selling their choices to visitors at the show. Typhoon focus on selling gym equipment and offering spray tans to visitors, but face a lack of strategy, weak sale skills, and fail to make use of a promotional opportunity for their products. Collaborative focus on selling two varieties of saunas and offering massages, making good sales on both from well-assigned members and using an opportunity in the expo to promote their products. Typhoon face questions over their weak sales in the task and, of the final three, Alex Finn is fired for his failure to demonstrate any sales skills and barely contributing to tasks.
187	5	"Shoe Design"	31 October 2018	7.47
Each team is tasked with creating a new range of female shoe, before hosting an event to launch it to potential customers. Typhoon create a vibrant trainer that they showcase in a beach bar, and achieve good sales, despite failing to stick to an agreed sales strategy and facing concerns from customers about the product's design. Collaborative create an urban-themed high-heeled shoe that they showcase in a nightclub, but sell less than Typhoon due to mixed feedback on their product's design. In the boardroom, Typhoon are praised for a well-conceived design, while Lord Sugar has all but one member of Collaborative face scrutiny on their performance. Of these, Rick Monk is fired for his poor attitude and salesmanship, alongside his lack of contribution to tasks.
188	6	"Airline Advertising"	7 November 2018	7.43
Budget airlines are the basis of the next task, as each team creates a brand new one, complete with TV advert and crew uniform design, before pitching their concept to industry experts. Typhoon conceive of a business-focused airline, providing a good pitch and a clear marketing message, yet face questions on their uniform design, the choice of music in their advert, and the airline's name. Collaborative focus on a party-goers' airline, but provide a poor pitch and receive criticism on their marketing, the airline's name, and uniform design. Typhoon win the task, leaving Collaborative facing scrutiny over their heavily flawed concept. Of the final three, Kurran Pooni is fired for his poor leadership, failing to see any faults with the concept, and for his poor track record in the process.
189	7	"Urban Gardening"	14 November 2018	7.71
The teams each run an urban gardening service, completing jobs around London while managing their costs and ensuring customer satsifaction. Typhoon offer creative landscaping for customers using low cost materials, but face issues from delays and poor decisions, which leads to receiving less money from a lucrative client. Collaborative focus on securing high prices for their jobs and using mid-range materials, receiving a good income and impressing their corporate client, despite the practicality of some of their work being called into question, and the demonstrably poor work of two team members. Typhoon face the boardroom after their income is significantly less than that achieved by Collaborative. Of the losing team, Kayode Damali is fired over serious doubts on his skills and investment potential.
190	8	"Glasgow Art"	21 November 2018	6.80
Both teams head to Glasgow to represent artists, hosting an exhibition in their own gallery, and making money from sale commissions and artwork-branded gifts. Typhoon represent an artist who makes sculptures, yet despite reasonable sales with both visitors and a corporate client, face issues from a delayed opening, poor sales techniques, and a difficult member. Collaborative represent an artist who makes abstract artwork, managing good sales to the public, yet fail to sell any pieces with a corporate client who is unimpressed with the artist's work. In the boardroom, Collaborative manage a high income from sales and commissions, leaving Typhoon to face questions on their choice of artwork and their performance. Of the final three, Jasmine Kundra is ejected from the process for her decisions as team leader and her overall work ethics.
191	9	"TV Selling"	28 November 2018	6.50
Lord Sugar gives each team an airtime slot on a shopping channel, in order to sell to potential customers a selection of products they have chosen. Typhoon manage to make a good presentation of their selection that attract good sale figures, despite creating a poor, unusable promo for their broadcast. Collaborative struggle with selling their selection due to lack of energy in their presentation and problems with their production team, despite a well-made promo for their broadcast. Typhoon secure more accepted sales from their effort, leaving Collaborative to face scrutiny on their performance. Amongst the losing team, Tom Bunday is fired for his repeated failures as team leader and his overall track record, while Jackie Fast is dismissed for her manipulative behaviour, and for a business proposal that could thrive without the offered investment.
192	10	"Christmas Chocolate"	5 December 2018	6.78
Both teams find themselves tasked with producing a brand new range of Christmas chocolates, before pitching their creations to retailers with a unique presentation style. Collaborative create a range of Christmas-flavoured luxury chocolates and using a Santa Claus model in presentations, securing a large order after their product's packaging and taste are praised, despite concerns over the branding. Typhoon create a range of Christmas-themed alcoholic chocolates and using a cheeky dance routine in presentations, but receive few orders due to the poor taste of their product and heavy criticism of the poorly conceived branding. In the boardroom, Collaborative receive praise for their well-received product, leaving Typhoon to face criticism over their flawed creation. Amongst the losing team, Sarah-Ann Magson is fired for creating the heavily flawed branding concept, and lacking the passion and drive of her teammates.
193	SP–1	"The Final Five"	11 December 2018	N/A
As this year's series of The Apprentice draws closer to its finale, this special episode takes a look at profiling the true story behind the five remaining candidates. Discussing their backgrounds, experiences, personality, and strengths and weaknesses, are a selection of each candidate's friends, family and colleagues, as well as Lord Sugar's aides, Claude Littner and Karren Brady.
194	11	"Interviews"	12 December 2018	7.23
After facing ten tasks as teams, the five remaining candidates now compete as individuals in their next task – a series of tough, gruelling interviews with four of Lord Sugar's most trusted associates. Each member faces scrutiny over their backgrounds, work experience, track record, and business proposals when questioned by interviewers. Feedback to Lord Sugar, alongside observations by his aides, leads him to firing Sabrina Stocker for the limited scale-ability in her proposal, Khadija Kalifa for offering an unrealistic proposal, and Daniel Elahi for an unsuitable business proposal and questions on his character. Of the remaining two, Camilla Ainsworth is praised for offering a good proposal despite concerns on her business experience, while Sian Gabbidon is commended for offering a proposal with potential and having good experience in its associated industry. Note: This episode aired later than scheduled, due to the British Prime Minister Theresa May facing a vote of confidence which was being broadcast live on BBC1, which also subsequently affected the scheduled broadcast of You're Fired covering discussions over this episode's content.
195	SP–2	"Why I Fired Them"	13 December 2018	N/A
As the final looms, Lord Sugar takes a look back to the tasks he set for this year's series of The Apprentice. From creating budget airlines and Christmas chocolates, to running a gardening service and seeking bargains in Malta, he relives all of the mistakes, doomed decisions, and other notable events that occurred during the process, and provides his reasons behind each firing he made amongst the candidates for the process, which ultimately whittle them down to the two finalists for this series.
196	12	"The Final"	16 December 2018	7.74
After facing a multitude of business tasks and a tough interview, the two finalists, aided by old friends, face the task of presenting their business proposal to an audience of business and industry experts, detailing key areas in it – its name, its goals, its target market, and its business structure. Camilla works to present her plan for a premium nutmilk range of products, receiving praise for choosing a growing market with potential, yet faces questions on her proposal's costs and marketing price. Sian works to present her plan for an affordable luxury swimwear range, receiving praise for offering products that can be customised and reversed, yet faces concerns over the USP of her brand and the competitive market for her proposal. Based on feedback from these presentations, Lord Sugar deems that Sian Gabbidon will be his business partner for 2018 for her experience in her proposal's industry and her creative skills, leaving Camilla Ainsworth to become runner-up due to concerns over her lack of business experience to help expand her business plan. Note: This episode was aired later than originally scheduled because of live coverage of BBC Sports Personality of the Year 2018 overrunning its timeslot, which also subsequently shortened the broadcast of the You're Fired episode that followed The Apprentice.

== Ratings ==
Official episode viewing figures are from BARB and includes viewers on all devices.

Episode no.	Air date	7 day viewers (millions)	28 day viewers (millions)	BBC One weekly ranking
1	3 October 2018	7.07	7.32	5
2	10 October 2018	7.47	7.80	5
3	17 October 2018	7.34	7.60	5
4	24 October 2018	7.15	7.43	5
5	31 October 2018	7.12	7.47	4
6	7 November 2018	7.16	7.43	5
7	14 November 2018	7.52	7.71	5
8	21 November 2018	6.57	6.80	6
9	28 November 2018	6.33	6.54	7
10	5 December 2018	6.63	6.78	7
11	12 December 2018	7.16	7.23	12
12	16 December 2018	7.60	7.74	6
