= The Apprentice (British TV series) series 16 =

16th series of a British reality television series

The Apprentice
- Series 16
- A promo view of Lord Sugar standing in front of the Season 16 candidates.
- Starring: Alan Sugar; Karren Brady; Tim Campbell
- No. of episodes: 12

Release
- Original network: BBC One
- Original release: 6 January – 24 March 2022

Series chronology
- ← Previous; Series 15 Next → Series 17

The sixteenth series of British reality television series The Apprentice (UK) was broadcast in the UK on BBC One, between 6 January to 24 March 2022. Production of the series had originally been planned for Spring 2020, but due to the COVID-19 pandemic, was postponed by a year by the BBC, who aired six special compilation episodes, featuring highlights from previous series, between 1 October to 5 November 2020. Due to a serious bicycle accident, Claude Littner was replaced by Tim Campbell, the winner of the first series, as Lord Sugar's aide.

Sixteen candidates took part in the sixteenth series, with Harpreet Kaur becoming the overall winner. Excluding specials, the series averaged around 7.08 million viewers during its broadcast.

== Series overview ==
Applications for the sixteenth series began in late 2019, towards the end of the fifteenth series. Finalization of the 16 candidates to take part, along with filming, was not conducted until 2021, as the COVID-19 pandemic pushed back production by two years. The broadcast schedule for the series was set for the beginning of 2022, airing between January and February rather than during an Autumn schedule. During production, Lord Sugar was forced to find a replacement for Claude Littner, after he was involved a bicycle accident that left him seriously injured and requiring multiple surgeries. As a result, Tim Campbell, the winner of the first series, was brought in to stand-in for him; he was later given the role permanently following this series' conclusion. Campbell had to self-isolate prior to the tenth task, upon testing positive for Covid-19, and so Mike Soutar, a regular of the Interviews stage, filled in for him. Of those who took part, Harpreet Kaur would become the eventual winner, going on to use her prize to set up a dessert parlour she would rename Oh So Yum.

=== Candidates ===
Candidate	Background	Age	Result
Harpreet Kaur	Dessert Shop Owner	30	Winner
Kathryn Louise Burn	Online pyjama store owner	29	Runner-Up
Stephanie Affleck	Online children's store owner	28	Fired after the interviews stage
Brittany Carter	Hotel front of house manager	25	Fired after the interviews stage
Akeem Bundu-Kamara	Financial firm strategy manager	29	Fired after the tenth task
Aaron Willis	Flight operations instructor	38	Fired after the tenth task
Akshay Thakrar	Digital marketing agency owner	28	Fired after the ninth task
Nick Showering	Finance manager	31	Fired after the eighth task
Sophie Wilding	Boutique cocktail bar owner	32	Fired after the seventh task
Amy Anzel	Beauty brand owner	48	Fired after the sixth task
Francesca Kennedy Wallbank	Sustainability company owner	26	Fired after the fifth task
Alex Short	Commercial cleaning company owner	27	Fired after the fourth task
Navid Sole	Pharmacist	27	Fired after the third task
Shama Amin	Children's day nursery owner	41	Quit before the third task
Conor Gilsenan	Sales executive	29	Fired after the second task
Harry Mahmood	Regional operations manager	35	Fired after the first task

=== Performance chart ===
Candidate	Task Number											
Candidate	1	2	3	4	5	6	7	8	9	10	11	12
Harpreet	IN	IN	IN	WIN	IN	LOSS	IN	WIN	IN	LOSE	IN	HIRED
Kathryn	WIN	IN	LOSS	BR	IN	LOSE	LOSS	BR	BR	BR	IN	RUNNER-UP
Stephanie	IN	IN	LOSS	LOSS	LOSS	WIN	LOSS	LOSE	BR	BR	FIRED	
Brittany	IN	IN	IN	IN	LOSE	IN	IN	IN	WIN	BR	FIRED	
Akeem	BR	LOSS	IN	IN	WIN	LOSS	WIN	IN	IN	FIRED		
Aaron	LOSS	LOSE	IN	IN	IN	BR	IN	IN	IN	FIRED		
Akshay	LOSE	LOSS	BR	BR	LOSS	IN	BR	BR	FIRED			
Nick	LOSS	BR	WIN	IN	LOSS	IN	BR	FIRED				
Sophie	IN	IN	LOSE	LOSS	BR	IN	FIRED					
Amy	IN	IN	LOSS	LOSS	IN	FIRED						
Francesca	IN	WIN	IN	IN	FIRED							
Alex	LOSS	LOSS	IN	FIRED								
Navid	LOSS	LOSS	FIRED									
Shama	IN	IN	LEFT									
Conor	LOSS	FIRED										
Harry	FIRED											

Key:

HIRED The candidate won this series of The Apprentice.
RUNNER-UP The candidate was the runner-up.
WIN The candidate won as project manager on their team, for this task.
LOSE The candidate lost as project manager on their team, for this task.
IN The candidate was on the winning team for this task / they passed the Interviews stage.
LOSS The candidate was on the losing team for this task.
BR The candidate was brought to the final boardroom for this task.
FIRED The candidate was fired in this task.
PM The candidate lost as project manager for this task and was fired.
LEFT The candidate left the competition on this task.

== Episodes ==
No. overall	No. in series	Title	Original release date	UK viewers (millions)
211	1	"Cruise Ship"	6 January 2022	7.16
Lord Sugar returns following the COVID-19 pandemic, in search of a new business partner for 2022 amongst sixteen new candidates. His first task involves them coming up with a marketing campaign for a new cruise liner, including a social media teaser, before pitching their concept to industry experts. The men focus on health and wellbeing for older people, but face criticism with their branding. The women focus on adult-only cruising for friends, yet face concerns with their brand name and social media promotion. Lord Sugar ultimately chooses the women's concept as the best of the teams, leaving the men facing scrutiny over their idea. Of the final three, Harry Mahmood is the first to be fired by Lord Sugar for being too disruptive during the task.
212	2	"Toothbrush"	13 January 2022	7.18
Dental health is the theme for the candidate's next task, as each team designs a brand new electric toothbrush for 6-8 year olds, including an accompanying app, before pitching it to retailers for orders. The men design their toothbrush as a wand with a fantasy wizard themed app, but face issues with their concept, along with criticism on their toothbrush's design and their app. The women opt for an orange-coloured toothbrush with sci-fi themed app, which proves popular despite issues with their branding and app. In the boardroom, the women secure the most orders, leaving the men to deal with criticism over their product. Of the final three, Conor Gilsenan is fired for failing to display his claimed expertise in app creation and for disregarding instructions from the project manager.
213	3	"Non-Alcoholic Drinks"	20 January 2022	7.39
Lord Sugar decides the teams should make their own brand of non-alcoholic drink, before promoting it with a pitch and securing sales from attending retailers. Due to health issues, Shama Amin withdraws from the process immediately before the task's briefing and the team's subsequent reshuffling and naming. Diverse create a vodka-styled energy lime soda, but face criticism over its flavour. Infinity create a mixed-spice drink, but face criticism over its flavour and its poor branding. In the boardroom, Diverse secured the most sales to win, leaving Infinity to be questioned over their drink's poor reception. Of the final three, Navid Sole is dismissed for his lack of contributions and poor teamwork skills.
214	4	"Fishing"	27 January 2022	7.44
The candidates face the task of establishing a fish business, sourcing fish on one day, before selling some to a corporate client and converting the rest into a fish dish to sell to the public, making as much profit as possible. Diverse offer pollock and Dover sole to their corporate client and pollock fish tacos for the public, but face issues with quality control. Infinity offer monkfish and plaice to their corporate client and crab arancini to the public but face several problems during the task. In the boardroom Diverse win the task with strong profits, leaving Infinity's performance under scrutiny. Of the final three, Alex Short is fired for his mismanagement throughout the entire task.
215	5	"Gaming"	3 February 2022	7.15
Video game designing is the subject of the next task, with each team tasked to create a beta version, including trailer, to pitch to gaming experts for investment. Diverse design an eco-themed platform game focused on collecting Arctic animals, but face criticism on their game in the pitch. Infinity design an action game centred around a falsely convicted spy who must escape prison, which earns praise in their pitch despite some concerns. In the boardroom, Infinity win with the better design, leaving Diverse to face questions over their concept's poor reception. Of the final three, Francesca Kennedy Wallbank is ejected from the process for contributing to most of the mistakes that doomed her team's concept. Following the firing, Lord Sugar visits the candidates' house, to inform them of the next task.
216	6	"Wales"	10 February 2022	7.00
The candidates are sent to Wales to offer a unique tourist experience within the Snowdonia region, achieving as much profit as possible. Diverse run a highland railway tour with watercolour painting and whiskey tasting, but face issues including time management and seeking commissions. Infinity run a quarry tour with zip-lines, cave exploring and cheese tasting, but fail to maintain their sales strategy along with dealing with other problems. In the boardroom, Diverse win by securing better profits, with Infinity questioned over their lacklustre tour experience. Of the final three, Amy Anzel is dismissed for her overall lack of contributions and failing to prove herself by being a project manager in tasks.
217	7	"Pods"	17 February 2022	7.16
Creating a new brand for their own electric driverless vehicle, both teams seek to impress with their design when pitching for sales. Diverse theme their vehicle around parties under the name "StarPod", but face miscommunication among the team and serious criticism over the concept. Infinity focus on a clean energy theme under the name "BeePure", but face criticism over the concept's design. In the boardroom, Infinity win by securing the most sales, with Diverse questioned over their flawed design. Of the final three, Sophie Wilding is fired for her poor leadership, her design concept, and her poor communication amongst her team.
218	8	"Silverstone"	24 February 2022	6.92
Candidates face the job of running a racing-themed corporate away day at Silverstone, including a tour and lunch service, earning as much profit as they can from their client's budget. Diverse opt for a luxury experience for their clients, but suffer communication problems and delays in their lunch service. Infinity run a trackside tour, but face criticism from their clients over their arrangements. In the boardroom, Infinity win by securing the most profit, leaving Diverse to be questioned over their failure. Amongst the losing team, Nick Showering is dismissed for failing to demonstrate any exceptional skills and his lack of contribution to the tasks.
219	9	"TV Selling"	3 March 2022	7.03
For their next task, teams are challenged with making sales live on a TV shopping channel, choosing whichever products will appeal to their potential customers. Diverse choose a reasonable selection of products, but face chaos over their broadcast session. Infinity face questions over their selection of products, but manage their TV sales efficiently. In the boardroom, Infinity win the task after securing several successful transactions, leaving Diverse to be questioned over their performance. Amongst the losing team, Akshay Thakrar is fired for his overall track record and his mismanagement of the team's broadcast segment.
220	10	"Baby Food"	10 March 2022	6.77
Lord Sugar summons the remaining candidates to KidZania in west London, where he reveals that their next task is to create brand new baby food. Diverse opt for a Middle Eastern-style 'Moroccan Medley' dish, but face criticism over the poor taste and thick texture of the product. Infinity opt for a Pan-Asian style curry, but face harsh criticism for the branding, which on the label reads out "First Time F Dies". In the boardroom, both teams secure no orders, leaving both to be questioned over their poor products. Amongst the candidates, Aaron Willis is dismissed for his mismanagement of creating the baby food, and Akeem Bundu-Kamara is ejected from the process for his overall lack of contribution to the tasks and failing to notice the major error in the name of his team's product. Notes: Tim Campbell was absent for this episode as he had to self-isolate after coming into contact with someone who tested positive for COVID-19, and was replaced by Mike Soutar.
221	SP–1	"The Final Four"	15 March 2022	N/A
With just two more tasks remaining, the remaining aspiring entrepreneurs go under the microscope, revealing the real people behind the businesswear.
222	11	"Interviews"	17 March 2022	7.03
After facing ten tasks as teams, the remaining four candidates now compete as individuals in their next task – a series of tough, grueling interviews with Lord Sugar’s most trusted advisors, Claude Littner, Mike Soutar, Claudine Collins and Linda Plant. Each member faces scrutiny over their backgrounds, work experience, track record, and business proposals when questioned by interviewers. Feedback to Lord Sugar, alongside observations by his aides, leads him to firing Brittany Carter for offering a proposal she has no experience in, and Stephanie Affleck due to concerns about certain aspects of her proposed business. Of the final two, Kathryn Louise Burn is considered a risk due to ecological and sustainability concerns, and Harpreet Kaur is also considered a risk due to her business proposal involving a business she already co-owns, despite her track record.
223	SP–2	"Why I Fired Them"	21 March 2022	N/A
As the final looms, Lord Sugar takes a look back to the tasks he set for this year's series of The Apprentice. From creating a new driverless pod and baby food, to running a corporate away day at Silverstone and selling products live on TV, he relives all of the mistakes, doomed decisions, and other notable events that occurred during the process, and provides his reasons behind each firing he made amongst the candidates for the process, which ultimately whittle them down to the two finalists for this series.
224	12	"The Final"	24 March 2022	6.81
After facing a multitude of business tasks and a tough interview, the two finalists, aided by old colleagues, face the task of launching their respective new businesses, produce advertising campaigns and pitching their businesses to a series of industry experts. Harpreet works to present her plan for an expanded dessert parlour, receiving praise for her established track record in the industry, yet faces concerns over the scalability of her business. Kathryn works to create a new brand of pyjamas, receiving praise for her clothing design skills, but is faced with questions over the branding and lack of scalability. Based on feedback from these presentations, Lord Sugar deems Harpreet Kaur to be his business partner for 2022 for her solid track record in the process in tandem with a solid business plan, leaving Kathryn Louise Burn as runner-up due to concerns regarding the longevity and popularity of her business.
