= Gabbidon =

Gabbidon is a surname. Notable people with the surname include:

- Basil Gabbidon (born 1955), British Jamaican guitarist and singer
- Danny Gabbidon (born 1979), British footballer
- Shaun L. Gabbidon (born 1967), British criminologist and author
- Sian Gabbidon (born 1992), British businesswoman, fashion designer, and media personality
