= The Apprentice (British TV series) series 13 =

Thirteenth season of UK television series

The Apprentice
- Series 13
- Promo group shot of Alan Sugar standing before the candidates for series 13
- Starring: Alan Sugar; Karren Brady; Claude Littner
- No. of episodes: 14

Release
- Original network: BBC One
- Original release: 4 October – 17 December 2017

Series chronology
- ← Previous; Series 12 Next → Series 14

The thirteenth series of British reality television series The Apprentice (UK) was broadcast in the UK on BBC One, from 4 October to 17 December 2017. Alongside the standard twelve episodes, the series was preceded by the mini online episode Meet the Candidates on 26 September, with two specials aired alongside the series – The Final Five on 8 December, and Why I Fired Them on 14 December.

Eighteen candidates took part, with James White and Sarah Lynn becoming the overall winners, marking the first time in the programme's history that a series ended with joint winners. Excluding the specials, the series averaged around 6.94 million viewers during its broadcast.

== Series overview ==
Filming took place during spring and early summer 2017. Unlike previous series that had aired in the spring, it was decided that The Apprentice would maintain its relatively new autumn broadcast for the foreseeable future, having initially been a convenience slot owing to historic schedule clashes with political and sporting events of previous years.

This series' team names were Vitality and Graphene. James White and Sarah Lynn were crowned joint winners, an event that marks the first time in the programme's history that more than one person received a business investment. The aftermath of this result received mixed feedback from viewers. While James would go on to use his investment to start up his IT recruitment firm 'Right Time Recruitment', Sarah would go on to use her investment to start up an online personalised sweets company, 'Sweets in the City'.

=== Candidates ===
Candidate	Background	Age	Result
James White	Recruitment firm owner	26	Joint Winners
Sarah Lynn	Confectionery company owner	35	Joint Winners
Michaela Wain	Construction business owner	33	Fired after Interviews stage
Elizabeth McKenna	Florist chain owner	39	Fired after Interviews stage
Joanna Jarjue	Digital marketing manager	23	Fired after Interviews stage
Jade English	PR & marketing manager	25	Fired after tenth task
Harrison Jones	Sales executive	27	Fired after tenth task
Bushra Shaikh	Clothing company owner	34	Fired after ninth task
Charles Burns	Management consultant	24	Fired after eighth task
Anisa Topan	PR fashion agency owner	36	Fired after eighth task
Andrew Brady	Project engineer	26	Fired after eighth task
Sajan Shah	Event company owner	24	Fired after seventh task
Sarah-Jayne Clark	Clothing company owner	25	Fired after sixth task
Ross Fretten	Digital product consultant	29	Fired after fifth task
Siobhan Smith	Wedding company owner	34	Fired after fourth task
Elliot Van Emden	Legal firm owner	31	Fired after third task
Jeff Wan	Business analyst	28	Fired after second task
Danny Grant	Online retail store owner	32	Fired after first task

=== Performance chart ===
Candidate	Task Number											
Candidate	1	2	3	4	5	6	7	8	9	10	11	12
James	LOSS	BR	LOSS	IN	IN	IN	LOSE	WIN	LOSS	IN	IN	HIRED
Sarah	WIN	IN	IN	IN	LOSS	IN	IN	LOSS	LOSE	BR	IN	HIRED
Michaela	IN	IN	LOSE	IN	LOSS	LOSS	WIN	LOSS	IN	IN	FIRED	
Elizabeth	IN	IN	IN	BR	IN	WIN	BR	IN	BR	IN	FIRED	
Joanna	IN	IN	IN	BR	WIN	IN	BR	IN	IN	WIN	FIRED	
Jade	IN	IN	WIN	LOSS	IN	LOSS	IN	LOSS	IN	FIRED		
Harrison	LOSS	LOSS	BR	IN	BR	IN	LOSS	IN	WIN	FIRED		
Bushra	IN	WIN	IN	LOSS	IN	IN	LOSS	IN	FIRED			
Charles	BR	LOSS	LOSS	IN	LOSS	BR	IN	FIRED				
Anisa	IN	IN	IN	LOSS	IN	LOSS	IN	FIRED				
Andrew	LOSS	LOSS	LOSS	WIN	LOSS	BR	IN	FIRED				
Sajan	LOSS	LOSS	LOSS	IN	LOSE	IN	FIRED					
Sarah-Jayne	IN	IN	IN	LOSS	IN	FIRED						
Ross	LOSS	LOSE	LOSS	IN	FIRED							
Siobhan	IN	IN	IN	FIRED								
Elliot	BR	LOSS	FIRED									
Jeff	LOSS	FIRED										
Danny	FIRED											

Key:

HIRED The candidate won this series of The Apprentice.
RUNNER-UP The candidate was the runner-up.
WIN The candidate won as project manager on their team, for this task.
LOSE The candidate lost as project manager on their team, for this task.
IN The candidate was on the winning team for this task / they passed the Interviews stage.
LOSS The candidate was on the losing team for this task.
BR The candidate was brought to the final boardroom for this task.
FIRED The candidate was fired in this task.
FIRED The candidate lost as project manager for this task and was fired.

== Episodes ==
No. overall	No. in series	Title	Original release date	UK viewers (millions)
169	1	"Burgers"	4 October 2017	6.67
For their first task, teams must create a range of luxury burgers to sell to passing customers. The women create beef and chicken burgers and, while they secure good sales, they use cheap meat for their patties. The men create buffalo and turkey burgers, but secure few sales due to long manufacturing times, labelling issues, and poor marketing locations. The women secure victory, leaving the men to face the boardroom over their poor performance. Of the final three, Danny Grant becomes the first candidate to be fired for his indecisive leadership, poor time management skills and inability to handle the pressure of his role.
170	2	"Hotel Redesign"	11 October 2017	7.10
The teams become interior designers for a five-star hotel, where each must come up with a luxury hotel room concept and pitch their creation to the hotel manager and a leading interior designer. Graphene choose a golf-themed room and, while they negotiate well on furniture costs, their decorating is deemed low-quality. Vitality choose a British theme, making poor negotiations on furniture and delivering a poor pitch. As neither design is favoured by the experts, Lord Sugar deems Graphene's concept the better of the two, leaving Vitality to face scrutiny. Of the losing team, Jeff Wan is fired for his lack of contributions.
171	3	"Robots"	18 October 2017	6.95
One half of each team sells a new line of robot toys, while the other half create a new prototype robot to pitch to major retailers. Graphene sell a range of flying robot toys, while promoting a concept of a new educational robot that uses a unique teaching style. They achieve decent sales of toys and large orders for their prototype, despite in-fighting amongst team members. Vitality sell a range of balancing robot toys, while promoting a concept of a robot designed to combat loneliness in the elderly population, capable of teaching yoga positions and providing vocal reminders. While they achieve good sales on their choice of toys, the prototype receives no orders due to their poor pitches and the overall concept being overwhelmingly disliked. Graphene win the task, leaving Vitality to face questions over their flawed concept. Of the final three, Elliot Van Emden is fired for falsely claiming credit on the team's choice of toy, and his lack of contributions in tasks.
172	4	"Stadium Sales"	25 October 2017	7.00
Before the final of the Women's FA Cup commences at Wembley Stadium, teams must manage a corporate box, each providing food and entertainment to their VIP clients, along with selling snacks to match day crowds. Graphene's chosen snacks sell well, and they achieve excellent customer satisfaction ratings from their clients. However, their efforts are hampered by a costing error that results in them supplying their VIP box with unlimited drinks. Vitality focus on keeping costs down and, but lack a strong pricing strategy for their snacks. Graphene soon face questions in the boardroom when their lack of strategy leave them earning less profit than Vitality. Of the final three, Siobhan Smith is fired for contributing to the poor strategy, as well as to crucial mistakes in the team's performance, and failing a task she was qualified to lead.
173	5	"Lord Sugar's Birthday"	1 November 2017	6.95
Lord Sugar supplies each team with a list of nine items he requires, each marking a milestone in his life and career, expecting each to be purchased at bargain prices around London. Vitality focus on sourcing their purchases on the outskirts of the city, managing to secure six items, but are hampered by wasting time with a gamble that backfires and by lacking focus on high value items. Graphene focus on quick research before leaving and conducting more on the move, securing all nine items despite paying more for some purchases and being fined for lateness. Vitality face questions over their performance, after their total spend is greater than that of Graphene. Of the losing team, Ross Fretten is fired for his lack of contributions in tasks and demonstrating no notable business skills.
174	6	"Bruges Tour"	8 November 2017	6.84
Lord Sugar sends the teams to the Belgian city of Bruges, where each must provide a high-quality tour to a group of cruise ship passengers, complete with a visit to major tourist site and a choice of souvenirs. Graphene focus on a modern city tour with a tasting session of Belgian chocolates, achieving good ticket sales and receiving additional income from their luxury souvenir bags. Vitality focus on a historical city tour with a beer-tasting session, managing their costs and achieving reasonable ticket sales, but face poor feedback of their tour from their tourists while receiving few sales on their keychain souvenirs. Although both teams are forced to give refunds, Graphene are praised on their overall effort, leaving Vitality to face questions on their poor decisions. Of the final three, Sarah-Jayne Clark is ejected from the process for her poor strategy and weak presence as leader, and her lack of contributions in tasks.
175	7	"Advertising – Cars"	15 November 2017	7.31
Each team is given the same new model of car with which to create a unique brand, complete with promotional campaign, before pitching their concept to industry experts. Graphene devise a family-friendly car, but face issues from a lack of co-ordination, using the wrong filming location for their TV advert, and delivering a poor pitch, with the experts criticising the branding and advertising. Vitality conceptualise a car specifically for young women and despite the experts raising concerns over their digital billboard and branding, they praise their well-conceived TV advert. Feedback from the experts lead to a victory for Vitality, leaving Graphene to face criticism over their flawed creation. Of the losing team, Sajan Shah is dismissed for his weak creativity on the task and demonstrating a lack of notable business skills.
176	8	"Doggy Business"	22 November 2017	6.70
Each team runs their own canine care services for two days, with one half running a mobile operation, and the other operating a facility at an established dog care centre. Vitality conduct a poop-scooping service and provide a canine spa facility, but face issues as the mobile team are overwhelmed with the work they take on, while the spa team secures few appointments. Graphene conduct a mobile photoshoot service and operate a canine agility course and despite the mobile team conducting a sub-standard service, the training team garner a healthy income from selling canine products at their facility. While Graphene are praised on their business strategy and cinch victory, Vitality face further scrutiny of their performance in the boardroom. Of the losing team, three members are fired: Andrew Brady, for his unprofessional attitude and poor pricing strategy; Anisa Topan, for a prolonged lack of contributions; and Charles Burns, for his poor leadership and overall track record.
177	9	"Food Boxes"	29 November 2017	6.44
Teams must create their own healthy meal kit, complete with cooking instructions, before demonstrating their concept to leading cuisine experts. Vitality opt for a chicken curry meal kit, managing to generate an easy recipe and a good presentation, yet disagree amongst themselves on their branding and the experts later heavily question the healthiness of their kit, the branding, and the lack of photos to complement the kit's recipe. Graphene focus on a salmon risotto gourmet meal kit and despite providing a clear recipe with photos to complement it, their presentation is panned by the experts, who criticise the branding and raise questions over the manufacture of their kit. Votes made by the experts reveal Vitality to be the winner, leaving Graphene to face questions over their performance on the task. Of the final three, Bushra Shaikh is fired for her team's poor presentation and her lack of contributions in tasks.
178	10	"Fashion Show"	6 December 2017	6.44
Each team represents a fashion designer and must host a catwalk show of their new collection, conceive of a magazine cover, and earn commission from the sales of their pieces. Vitality represent a collection of expensive dresses for a 10% commission on each sale but, despite a reasonable performance and good magazine cover design, they secure low sales due to the price of their fashion line. Graphene represent a collection of affordable dresses for a 17% commission on each sale and, despite a poor magazine cover design and aggressive sales tactics, the team secure a large amount of sales. Vitality soon face questions on their decisions after Graphene emerge victorious for their high overall commissions total. Of the losing team, Harrison Jones is fired for his lack of sales and contributions, while Jade English is fired for her choice of designer, and her poor presentation and negotiation skills that contributed to the team's loss.
179	SP–1	"The Final Five"	13 December 2017	N/A
As this year's series of The Apprentice draws closer to its finale, this special episode profiles the five remaining candidates, with input from their friends, family and colleagues, as well as Lord Sugar's aides, Claude Littner and Karren Brady.
180	11	"Interviews"	13 December 2017	6.80
After facing ten tasks as teams, the five remaining candidates now compete as individuals in their next task – a series of tough, gruelling interviews with four of Lord Sugar's most trusted associates. Each member faces scrutiny over their backgrounds, work experience, track record, and business proposals. Feedback to Lord Sugar, alongside observations by his aides, leads him to firing Joanna Jarjue for lacking the required experience in her proposal's associated industry, Elizabeth McKenna for the limited scaleability of her proposal and her attitude, and Michaela Wain for offering confusing answers in interviews and her lack of required focus for her proposal. Of the remaining two, James White is praised for his background and proposal, while Sarah Lynn receives good feedback on her notable business qualities.
181	SP–2	"Why I Fired Them"	16 December 2017	N/A
As the final looms, Lord Sugar takes a look back on this series' tasks. From programming toy robots to crafting burgers, he relives all of the mistakes, doomed decisions, and other notable events that occurred during the process, and provides his reasons behind each firing.
182	12	"The Final"	17 December 2017	8.09
After facing a multitude of business tasks and a tough interview, the two finalists, aided by old friends, face the task of presenting their business proposal to an audience of business and industry experts. James presents his plan for an IT recruitment firm and, despite a good presentation, promotional material, and displays of enthusiasm, the experts raise concerns over the USP of his brand and the competitive market he would be entering. Sarah presents her plans for an online personalised sweet business, receiving positive feedback on her presentation, promotional material and potential of her concept, despite questions being raised over the scaleability of her new business. Based on feedback from these presentations, Lord Sugar invests in both candidates' businesses, marking the first time in the programme's history that a win was shared.

== Ratings ==
Official episode viewing figures are from BARB.

Episode no.	Air date	7-day viewers (millions)	28-day viewers (millions)	BBC One weekly ranking
1	4 October 2017	6.49	6.67	6
2	11 October 2017	6.90	7.10	3
3	18 October 2017	6.73	6.95	6
4	25 October 2017	6.79	7.00	4
5	1 November 2017	6.81	6.95	5
6	8 November 2017	6.76	6.84	7
7	15 November 2017	7.19	7.31	4
8	22 November 2017	6.57	6.70	7
9	29 November 2017	6.29	6.44	9
10	6 December 2017	6.34	6.44	10
11	13 December 2017	6.74	6.80	6
12	17 December 2017	7.99	8.09	2
