= Leah Totton =

Northern Irish entrepreneur

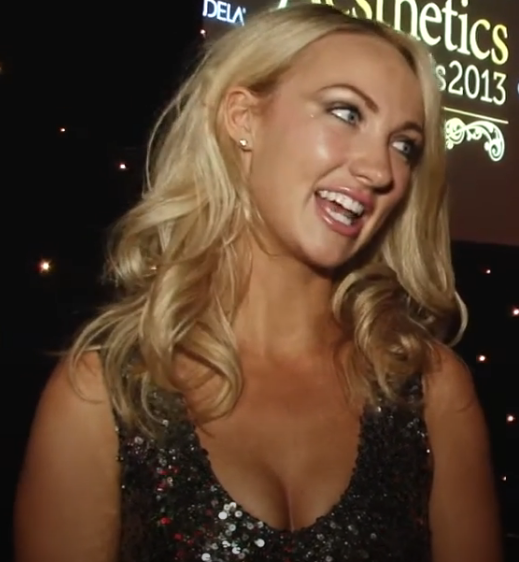
- Totton in 2013
- Born: 22 January 1988 (age 38); Derry, Northern Ireland, United Kingdom
- Other names: Dr Leah
- Education: Bachelor of Medicine, Bachelor of Surgery (Distinction)
- Occupations: Doctor (NHS & private), business owner
- Employer: Dr Leah Cosmetic Skin Clinics
- Known for: Winning the 9th series of The Apprentice, Owner Dr Leah Cosmetic Skin Clinics
- Awards: Most Trusted UK Clinics 2023
- Website: www.drleah.co.uk

Leah Totton (born 22 January 1988) is a British practising physician, entrepreneur and former model from Derry, Northern Ireland, who won the 2013 series of BBC One's The Apprentice. Her business plan, a cosmetic clinic chain, named Dr Leah Clinics, co-owned with Alan Sugar, launched in 2014. Their business was a success, with their London clinic winning national awards. Dr Leah Clinics expanded to open further branches in London and Essex, and the pair also launched Dr Leah skincare products. Totton received media attention for her glamorous appearance, her success on the show, the success of her resulting business and for advocacy of improved ethics and integrity in the cosmetic treatment industry. Despite the success of her business she remained committed to NHS and returned to work part-time as a GP in 2017.

== Background ==
Leah Totton grew up in Derry, Northern Ireland. She attended Foyle College. She studied medicine at the University of East Anglia in Norwich, graduating as a physician in 2011, aged 23 after working as a model until that point. She subsequently registered with the General Medical Council.

In 2013, Totton won the £250,000 prize for business acumen on BBC One's The Apprentice, a British reality television competition that offers the winner an opportunity to start a business with British business magnate Alan Sugar. Along with Sugar, she set up a chain of ethical Cosmetic Clinics, Dr Leah Clinics. She continued work as a physician within the NHS on a part-time basis.

== Dr Leah Clinic ==
In 2014, Dr Leah Clinic, co-owned with Sugar, opened in central London. There was criticism at the time regarding Totton's young age and level of experience by several members of the British Association of Aesthetic Plastic Surgeons (BAAPS). Alongside Sugar she has gone on to open further Dr Leah Clinic branches in Essex and London. Her clinics have been voted ‘Best Clinic London’ and awarded ‘Most Trusted UK Clinic 2023’ and reported a yearly turnover of £2.7 million in 2022. The pair also launched a Skincare line, Dr Leah Skincare in October 2022. In 2024 Totton and Sugar sold a majority stake of the company in a multimillion pound acquisition to private equity investors. They continue to hold minority stakes in the company and Totton continues to work at the clinics.

== Industry standards ==
Totton has advocated better regulation and improved standards in the cosmetic industry. She endorsed a 2013 review by Sir Bruce Keogh, NHS medical director, that expressed concern over lack of proper qualifications for some dermal filler treatments. Her expressed reason for being drawn to the field was to improve standards and help reduce adverse outcomes.

== Personal life ==
She has frequently spoken out on women's issues.
