= Corpus Christi Catholic College =

Location
- Neville Road; Leeds, West Yorkshire, LS9 0TT; England
- Coordinates: 53.7972°N 1.4847°W

Information
- Type: Academy
- Motto: Laborare est orare (To work is to pray)
- Religious affiliation: Roman Catholic
- Established: 1968
- Local authority: City of Leeds
- Trust: The St Gregory the Great Catholic Trust
- Department for Education URN: 148294 Tables
- Ofsted: Reports
- Principal: James O'Doherty
- Gender: Co-educational
- Age: 11 to 16
- Colours: Purple & yellow
- Publication: C-Mail (school newsletter)
- Website: http://www.corpusleeds.org/

Corpus Christi Catholic College is a co-educational secondary school located in Halton Moor, Leeds, West Yorkshire, England. The school currently has a roll of around 900 to 1,000 pupils. Around 50% of pupils achieve 5 A-C grades at GCSE.

== History ==
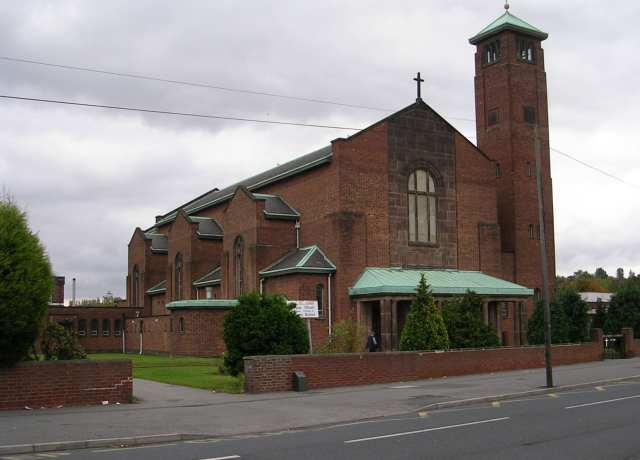
Corpus Christi Catholic Church, the adjacent church and namesake of the school.

Corpus Christi Roman Catholic Secondary School opened in March 1968. At the time of its opening, the school was noted for containing a telephone on one of its corridors which could be used by students and visitors.

In September 2001 Corpus Christi became the first Inner City Leeds High School to gain Specialist School status when it became a Technology College. In 2005 the school became a member of the Specialist Schools Most Improved Schools' Club for the second occasion. It was awarded a School Achievement Award in 2003 and a recognition for the Healthy Schools Scheme.

In November 2006 the school was rated as overall Grade 2 (Good) by Ofsted, while, the same month, awarding it Grade 1 (Outstanding).

Between 2009 and 2013, with funds from the UK Government and the Roman Catholic Diocese of Leeds, the school was refurbished and modernised.

Previously a voluntary aided school administered by Leeds City Council, in April 2021 Corpus Christi Catholic College converted to academy status. The school is now sponsored by the St Gregory the Great Catholic Academy Trust.

=== Murder of Ann Maguire ===
On 28 April 2014, Ann Maguire, a 61-year-old teacher, died in hospital after a stabbing at the school. A 15-year-old male student was arrested and two days later charged with her murder. Pope Francis expressed his "sincere sympathy" for the family of Mrs Maguire. On 3 November 2014,16-year-old Will Cornick was sentenced to be detained at Her Majesty's pleasure with a minimum tariff of 20 years for Maguire's murder.

== Feeder schools ==
Corpus Christi Catholic College feeder primary schools are Corpus Christi Catholic Primary School, St Theresa's Roman Catholic Primary School, St Gregory's Catholic Primary School, Our Lady's Catholic Primary School and St Nicholas' Catholic Primary School.

== Notable alumni ==
- Liz Dawn (1946–1951), British actress
- Sian Gabbidon, businesswoman
- Anthony McGowan, author
