= The Apprentice (British TV series) =

British reality television series

- Karren Brady, Alan Sugar and Tim Campbell
- Genre: Reality
- Created by: Mark Burnett
- Starring: Alan Sugar; Nick Hewer; Margaret Mountford; Karren Brady; Claude Littner; Tim Campbell
- Narrated by: Mark Halliley
- Theme music composer: Dru Masters
- Opening theme: "Dance of the Knights" by Sergei Prokofiev
- Country of origin: United Kingdom
- Original language: English
- No. of series: 20
- No. of episodes: 261 (including 32 specials)

Production
- Running time: 60 minutes
- Production companies: Talkback (2005); Talkback Thames (2006–11); Boundless (2012–19); Naked (2022–present); Mark Burnett Productions (2005–13); United Artists Media Group (2014–17); MGM Television (2018–present)

Original release
- Network: BBC Two
- Release: 16 February 2005 – 10 May 2006
- Network: BBC One
- Release: 28 March 2007 – present

Related
- The Apprentice (American TV series); The Apprentice (Irish TV series); The Apprentice: You're Fired!; Young Apprentice; The Celebrity Apprentice; The Celebrity Apprentice Australia; Celebrity Apprentice Ireland

The Apprentice is a British business-based reality television series created by Mark Burnett, distributed by Fremantle and broadcast by the BBC since 16 February 2005.

Devised after the success of the American original and part of the international franchise of the same name, the programme focusses on a group of businesspeople competing in a series of business-related challenges set by British business magnate Alan Sugar, with the aim of winning a business investment.

In order to observe candidates as they undertake these tasks, Sugar is aided by two close business associates who act as observers – these roles are currently performed by Karren Brady and Tim Campbell.

Originally aired on BBC Two, its first series generated favourable viewing figures that led to the creation of a companion discussion programme in 2007, The Apprentice: You're Fired!, with further increasing figures after the second series leading to the programme being aired on BBC One. The success of The Apprentice has led to it receiving its own merchandising, including a magazine and official books, along with one-off celebrity episodes for charity, and a spin-off, Young Apprentice, which ran between 2010 and 2012.

The programme is a staple of the BBC's television schedule, with the programme being the basis of several comedic parodies and imitations, as well as influencing the concepts of other British business-based programmes, such as Tycoon, and Beat the Boss.

== History ==
In March 2004, following the success of the first season of NBC's The Apprentice, FremantleMedia announced its intentions to create a British version of the programme under the same name and format. The company released a request for tender, with the most significant bids coming from the BBC and Channel 4. Negotiations finished on 1 April, when the BBC was announced as the new home of the programme.

In search for a host, the BBC made offers to several businesspeople, including Philip Green, Felix Dennis and Michael O'Leary, but each declined when approached. On 19 May, Alan Sugar agreed to helm the twelve episodes of the programme that had been commissioned. After the success of the first series, Sugar signed on for subsequent series.

== Format ==
=== Candidate selection ===
The programme's initial stage, which is not filmed, comprises auditions and interviews held across the United Kingdom.

The second stage, usually held in London, comprises group activities designed to test potential candidates' business skills and team work. Following this, between 20 and 30 applicants are chosen and given a psychological assessment and asked to provide references, before the final line-up is selected from this cohort. The number of candidates who appear in a series has varied over the programme's history, though the general arrangement sees a balanced number of men and women.

=== Tasks ===
Once the candidates are selected, they are divided into two teams (typically men versus women for the first couple of episodes) and adopt a team name for the duration of the series. Each series focusses on ten team-oriented tasks, with the exception of the seventh and eighth series which featured eleven.

Each episode covers a single task, which is designed to test candidates on important business skills, such salesmanship, negotiation, requisitioning, strategy, leadership, teamwork and organisation. Before each task is given, the teams are briefed by Sugar over what kind of challenge they will be conducting, what rules they must adhere to during the timespan of the task, and the conditions for winning – examples include procuring items on a limited budget; food production and sales; inventing toys, gym equipment, or furniture; marketing and PR tasks; and tourism tasks. The winner of a task is generally decided by the amount of profit made.

Before a task begins, each team must assign a project manager (PM) to lead them, whose role involves role delegation, making key decisions and managing team members carefully in order to minimise or avoid potential friction and disruptions.

PM selection is usually the result of a team vote: individuals may nominate themselves to stand as PM for the task, or other team members may recommend who would be best placed to be PM for that task. In both instances, reasons are given as to why any individual(s) would be suitable for the role, such as a candidate's business background, expertise or interest in the subject matter, the nature of the task, prior success in previous tasks and the level of confidence the other team members have in them. The PM is then voted upon by the team by the team members.

However, at times, Sugar himself may appoint someone into the role, based upon criteria such as his opinion of their performance in the process, their background or, since the seventh series, their business plan. The pre-task briefing is often used to rearrange teams as candidates are whittled down in the process, and is mainly done to either balance out team numbers, ensure a fair distribution of skills for a specific task, or to give less vocal candidates a chance to demonstrate their abilities.

Each team is provided with two vehicles to use as transport during tasks and they often split into further sub-teams. In some tasks, the candidates are given additional items to use to assist them, such as a shop space or a workshop. Although the teams are expected to work together, the competitive nature of the show means that candidates often focus on their individual roles and needs rather than the greater good of the team. During the execution of their task, each team is followed by one of Sugar's aides, who notes down their opinions, observations and thoughts for later reference in the boardroom, mostly on any noteworthy matters, such as performance, mistakes, and issues, minor or serious; while it is rare for them to intervene, they may do so if an issue gets severe enough.

=== Boardroom ===
Once a task is finished, the candidates report back to Sugar in the "boardroom" – either following the task's completion, or on the following day – to hear about feedback on their performance and learn the results of their endeavours. During team-based tasks, the process is played out in three stages in the following order – Results, Task Review, and Final Boardroom. Each stage is conducted in a different fashion, but follows a general format:

1. Result – Sugar and his advisers conduct an initial discussion with teams about their performance, and review what they did on the task – in tasks where a product, video marketing promotion, or branding is created, such items are provided in the boardroom for examination. During this stage, team members are invited to share feedback on each other's performances, whether praise or criticism. After this initial review, the results of the task are revealed, after which the winning team advances to the next stage and, until the nineteenth series, receives a reward for their performance. After they leave, the losing team are dispatched to the "Losers' Cafe" to discuss the factors that contributed to their loss, before they must return to the boardroom for an in-depth review of their performance.
2. Task review – The losing team are subjected to an extensive review of their performance in the boardroom, including open criticism of performance and/or contribution on the task. Candidates are granted the freedom to argue their cases for their respective performance and contributions, voice opinions about other members, and counter criticism if they feel it to be unjustified. After a period of discussion with each member, the appointed PM must then select two members of the team to return with them for a final boardroom discussion; a choice is not required if the team has only three members left in it. The choice made by the PM can be influenced by several factors, including responsibility for the team's loss, inexcusable mistakes, lack of contribution, and clash of personalities. Those not picked are free to return to the candidates' accommodation (the "House"), while remaining members are sent outside to allow Sugar and his aides time to privately discuss their observations and doubts about the "bottom three".
3. Final boardroom – The "bottom three" face a final debrief with Sugar and his advisers that involves further in-depth analysis and criticism of their actions in a task, their performance throughout the process so far, their relationship with other candidates, and any criticism raised against them. The candidates argue their cases and also suggest who amongst them should be fired from the process. Sugar makes a final summary when he calls discussions to an end, relaying his personal thoughts on each member, before eventually making his decision on who is fired – the selected candidate, to whom he gives his reasons for their removal, is pointed at and proclaimed eliminated with the words "You're fired!", a process that may be repeated if another candidate is also fired in the same week. The surviving candidate(s) return to the "House", while the fired candidate(s) depart via a waiting taxi and are taken "home", conducting a brief interview to reflect on their elimination.

While the boardroom scenes differ for the Interviews and Final (see sections below), there are a number of exceptions in regard to the standard boardroom format:

- Candidate firing – Sugar can choose to fire a candidate at any time in the boardroom if he deems it noteworthy. Thus a candidate could be fired during the first or second stage of the boardroom, rather than as a part of the bottom three.
- Reward – Sugar may withdraw the reward, if the winning team's performance on the task is considered to be too inadequate. In this case, they simply return to the "House" after the results. In later series, rewards were withdrawn completely.
- "Bottom three" selection – Sugar may opt to choose who returns for the final boardroom discussion, rather than let the PM make this choice themselves, while he can freely send someone back to the "House" if he feels they do not deserve to return to the boardroom.

=== Interviews ===
The Interviews are the penultimate stage of the competition, in which the five remaining candidates undergo interviews with a selection of trusted aides of Sugar; for the seventh and eighth series, this stage was the final step and featured four remaining candidates, instead of five.

In this stage, each interviewer questions the candidates over various topics, from their performance in the process, why they applied for the show, the content of their CVs, their business plans, and any concerns about their personalities. Discussions often focus around brash or controversial statements that candidates have made on their CVs and application forms, with the interviewers determining whether such claims are truthful, exaggerated or deceitful. Since the seventh series, following the change of prize, the interviewers also question the candidates about their business plans, discussing the feasibility of the idea, how the candidate would go about setting up the business, and whether they have the temperament and skills to deliver the plan.

After the interviews, Sugar invites the candidates back to the boardroom to discuss the feedback from the interviewers. He usually fires three candidates at this stage of the competition, leaving two finalists, with the exception of the fourth series that saw him only fire one candidate at this stage. For Series 7 and 8, where the Interviews was the final task, his decision determined the competition winner.

Key:

Interviewer

Interviewers	Series number																			
Interviewers	1	2	3	4	5	6	7	8	9	10	11	12	13	14	15	16	17	18	19	20
Nick Hewer																				
Paul Kemsley																				
Claude Littner																				
Margaret Mountford																				
Bordan Tkachuk																				
Karren Brady																				
Alan Watts																				
Matthew Riley																				
Mike Soutar																				
Claudine Collins																				
Ricky Martin																				
Linda Plant																				

=== Final ===
The final stage of the competition sees the finalists compete against each other in one final task, with the outcome influencing Sugar's decision on who wins the series overall. The final decision is often influenced by not only how successful a candidate is in the final task, but also their overall performance in the competition.

For Series 1–6, the final stage was a business-based task, as a final test of a candidate's skill set and their suitability to the job being offered as a prize. The tasks sees former candidates return to aid the finalists in their task. For Series 7–8, the final stage was the Interviews. Since the ninth series, the finalists' task is to promote their business idea, presenting their proposed plan along with its brand identity to a group of industry experts. In all versions, the finalists reconvene in the boardroom to discuss the results with Sugar. Eventually, he declares his choice by pointing to the winner and proclaiming "You're hired!", or "You're gonna be my business partner!", at which point the winner departs in Lord Sugar's limousine and conducts a brief victory interview, reflecting on their success in the competition.

While only two finalists ever reach the final stage, Series 4 featured four finalists, who were divided up into pairs, working as joint project managers respectively, with Sugar firing the pair with the poorest performance and hiring an individual from the remaining pair.

== The Board ==
Each boardroom session featured in the show consists of the same setup for "The Board", in the form of a panel that evaluates candidates' performances. Along with Sugar (the "boss"), the panel consists of his two personal advisers, who observe the candidates during each task. To date, five people have acted as Sugar's advisers. The following details each member of the board:

- Alan Sugar – The central figure of the show its conception. Outside the boardroom, he arranges the tasks the candidates undertake, including arranging the location for the task briefing, which he may give either in person or indirectly via a recorded message, and in some circumstances may attend a task primarily to observe a team while they pitch a product or host a live television task. Inside the boardroom, he makes choices based on feedback from his aides and industry experts, can overturn a result if he deems it wrong or unfair, withdraw a reward if the winning team is not deserving, and ultimately determines which candidates are fired from the process.

For the first four series, the show made frequent references to his connection with Amstrad, the electronics company he founded in 1968, and candidates originally referred to him "Sir Alan" in reference to his knighthood. From the fifth series onwards, he has been referred to as "Lord Sugar", owing to his ascendency into the House of Lords. Since the fifth series, he has been billed in the opening credits as controlling a "vast business empire".. Since its inception, Sugar has appeared on every final episode of You're Hired.

- Nick Hewer (series 1–10) – After Alan Sugar signed up for the programme, Hewer was brought in as one of his advisers, as he had closely worked with Sugar since 1983. He also appeared on the spin-off series Young Apprentice, and acted as a penultimate-stage interviewer during the first series of the programme. He has also appeared as a guest panellist on You're Fired. On 18 December 2014 he revealed that the tenth series would be his last, believing it to be "the appropriate time". His decision to leave was fully confirmed on the show's sister discussion programme, You're Hired!, following the broadcast of the final episode of Series 10.
- Margaret Mountford (series 1–5) – Mountford was brought on board as Sugar's second adviser, the two of them having worked together previously. On 1 June 2009, she announced in her column for the Daily Telegraph that the fifth series would be her last, citing that her departure would allow her to devote more time to her studies, with the decision fully confirmed during her appearance on You're Hired, after the final episode of Series 5. Despite departing from the aide role, she remained with the show for Series 6–9, acting as an interviewer for the Interviews stage of the competition.
- Karren Brady (series 6–present) – Following Margaret Mountford's departure from the role, Alan Sugar assigned Brady as his new adviser. A notable businesswoman in her own right, she had previously appeared on the show as an interviewer in the fourth and fifth series, and as a team leader for Comic Relief Does The Apprentice in 2007, where she led the team of celebrity women to victory while raising over £1,000,000 for charity. Her first appearance in the role was on Young Apprentice before the sixth series of the main show, and she regularly appears as a guest panellist on You're Fired!.
- Claude Littner (series 11–15, 17) – Primarily an interviewer on the show since its conception, he was appointed by Sugar as Nick Hewer's replacement following Hewer's departure, with his appointment being confirmed prior to the broadcast of the eleventh series. Although he operates in this role throughout the competition, he retains his position as an interviewer in the Interviews Stage, and appeared as a guest panellist on You're Fired since 2012.
- Tim Campbell (series 16–present) – The winner of the first series, he replaced Claude Littner as Sugar's aide for the sixteenth series, following Littner suffering an injury while cycling. Mike Soutar, a regular of the interview stage, filled in for Campbell in the tenth episode of the sixteenth series. Campbell returned for Series 17 on a permanent basis, again stepping in for Littner, who only appears in the first and eleventh episode.

Key:	The "Boss"	Board Member	Guest Board Member	Contestant

Cast member	Series																			
Cast member	1	2	3	4	5	6	7	8	9	10	11	12	13	14	15	16	17	18	19	20
Alan Sugar																				
Nick Hewer																				
Margaret Mountford																				
Karren Brady																				
Claude Littner																	^{1}			
Tim Campbell																				
Mike Soutar																				

Notes

1. Littner was only present on the board for one episode for the seventeenth series and acted in a reduced role. Campbell joined the show on a permanent basis, after stepping in for Littner in the previous series.

== Series overview ==
Series	Premiere date	Finale date	Episodes	Candidates	Team names	Winner	Runner-up	Average viewers (millions)
1	16 February 2005	4 May 2005	12 + 2	14	First Forte (girls); Impact (boys)	Tim Campbell	Saira Khan	2.60
2	22 February 2006	10 May 2006	12	14	Invicta (boys); Velocity (girls)	Michelle Dewberry	Ruth Badger	4.43
3	28 March 2007	13 June 2007	12 + 2	16	Eclipse (boys); Stealth (girls)	Simon Ambrose	Kristina Grimes	5.62
4	26 March 2008	11 June 2008	12 + 4	16	Alpha (girls); Renaissance (boys)	Lee McQueen	Claire Young	7.29
5	25 March 2009	7 June 2009	12 + 2	16	Empire (boys); Ignite (girls)	Yasmina Siadatan	Kate Walsh	8.37
6	6 October 2010	19 December 2010	12 + 2	16	Apollo (girls); Synergy (boys)	Stella English	Chris Bates	7.87
7	10 May 2011	17 July 2011	12 + 2	16	Logic (boys); Venture (girls)	Tom Pellereau	Helen Milligan	8.80
8	21 March 2012	3 June 2012	12 + 2	16	Phoenix (boys); Sterling (girls)	Ricky Martin	Tom Gearing	7.35
9	7 May 2013	17 July 2013	12 + 2	16	Endeavour (boys); Evolve (girls)	Leah Totton	Luisa Zissman	7.34
10	14 October 2014	21 December 2014	12 + 2	20	Summit (boys); Tenacity (girls)	Mark Wright	Bianca Miller	7.40
11	14 October 2015	20 December 2015	12 + 2	18	Connexus; Versatile	Joseph Valente	Vana Koutsomitis	7.33
12	6 October 2016	18 December 2016	12 + 2	18	Nebula (girls); Titans (boys)	Alana Spencer	Courtney Wood	7.28
13	4 October 2017	17 December 2017	12 + 2	18	Graphene (girls); Vitality (boys)	Sarah Lynn & James White	—N/a	6.94
14	3 October 2018	16 December 2018	12 + 2	16	Collaborative; Typhoon	Sian Gabbidon	Camilla Ainsworth	7.32
15	2 October 2019	18 December 2019	12 + 2	16	Empower; Unison	Carina Lepore	Scarlett Allen-Horton	7.17
16	6 January 2022	24 March 2022	12 + 2	16	Diverse; Infinity	Harpreet Kaur	Kathryn Louise Burn	7.09
17	5 January 2023	23 March 2023	12	18	Affinity; Apex	Marnie Swindells	Rochelle Raye Anthony	6.54
18	1 February 2024	18 April 2024	12	18	Nexus; Supream	Rachel Woolford	Phil Turner	6.01
19	30 January 2025	17 April 2025	12	18	Ascendancy; Parallel	Dean Franklin	Anisa Khan	5.63
20	29 January 2026	16 April 2026	12	20	Alpha; Eclipse	Karishma Vijay	Pascha Myhill	4.73
21	2027	2027	TBA	TBA	TBA	TBA	TBA	TBA

Note: the episodes are put as number of actual episodes + special episodes.

=== Series 1 (2005) ===
The first series began in February 2005, with the opening theme being "Montagues and Capulets". The viewer ratings climbed to almost 4 million viewers for the final episode on 4 May 2005. The winner of the first series was Tim Campbell, (Saira Khan finished as finalist) who had previously worked as a Senior Planner within the Marketing and Planning Department of London Underground. After his victory he went on to become Project Director of Amstrad's new Health and Beauty division at the time, but left the company to pursue other interests the following year, starting up the Bright Ideas Trust in 2008 which offers funding and support for young people wishing to start their own business.

In August 2008, the American cable channel CNBC began to air the first series on Monday nights, but it was ultimately either aired in disparate time slots or not at all due to the network's abrupt coverage of the 2008 financial crisis, leading to the series not being broadcast in full. With CNBC deciding to focus their prime time schedule on financial news programming, the programme's rights were moved to BBC America, where it started transmission on 5 May 2009.

=== Series 2 (2006) ===
The second series began on 22 February 2006, with a spin-off programme introduced on BBC Three to air alongside it called The Apprentice: You're Fired!. The second series finished with a record of 5.7 million viewers watching the final being won by Michelle Dewberry. Dewberry briefly took up a post under Sugar following the series, but left in September 2006 after a series of personal problems.

=== Series 3 (2007) ===
For the third series, 10,000 applications were received by the production staff, with a promise made to incorporate "tougher tasks and better people", after Sugar expressed concerns that the show was becoming similar in format to that of Big Brother. Alongside this, the BBC also revealed that the programme was being moved over to BBC One and aimed at a more "mainstream audience", with the broadcaster subsequently moving The Apprentice: You're Fired! to BBC Two as a direct result.

The third series started on 28 March 2007 with viewing figures of 4.5 million, climbing throughout the run to a peak of 6.8 million people, all watching the final being won by Simon Ambrose.

=== Series 4 (2008) ===
Candidates applying for the fourth series were invited to do so through the programme's official website, leading to 20,000 applications being submitted for the series, and 16 of them making it through to take part in the show. Its first episode aired on 26 March 2008, with its debut attracting 6.4 million viewers. This climbed to around 8.9 million viewers for the final episode, with an additional 800,000 viewers tuning in for the episode's final 15 minutes, to catch Lee McQueen winning the fourth series. Lee went on to initially work for Sugar's company AMSHOLD, where he phoned in sick on his first day.

=== Series 5 (2009) ===
Prior to the start of filming for the series, Adam Freeman, one of the lucky sixteen that had made it onto the fifth series, was forced to pull out; it was stated that his reasons for doing so were due to "family matters". This meant that when the series began on 25 March 2009, viewers got to see fifteen candidates vying for the prize, with Margaret Mountford announcing her decision to stand down as a participant of the show during its broadcast, officially confirming it on You're Fired. The fifth series was won by Yasmina Siadatan.

=== Series 6 (2010) ===
Following Mountford's departure, Karren Brady was officially revealed as her replacement on 30 August 2009, later revealing in a newspaper interview on 28 February 2010 that the contestants would no longer refer to Alan Sugar as "Sir Alan"', but instead must call him "Lord Sugar", following his elevation to the House of Lords as a life peer. Because of the 2010 general election being held in the United Kingdom, the BBC opted to delay the sixth series until after it had been held, as Alan Sugar had ties to the government at the time; although he stated his intention of maintaining his position in the show, the running of The Apprentice during the general election could have been a "risk to impartiality". Advertising of the series commenced after it was held, throughout the Summer, with the opening episode eventually broadcast on 6 October 2010. This series was the first to feature a two-hour crossover special between the main programme and its spin-off, You're Fired, a format that would be used in the series finals of both in subsequent years.

The sixth series was won by Stella English, who was placed into Sugar's company Viglen. In May 2011, she requested a new role after saying that she was just a "glorified PA", and retained this for a year before it was decided not to renew her contract. The decision drew considerable media attention, after she attempted to sue Sugar for wrongful dismissal in February 2012, only for the legal action to be ultimately unsuccessful.

=== Series 7 (2011) ===
Applications for the seventh series began in April 2010. Between the applicants being processed, to the filming of the first task, Sugar announced that the prize had been changed, and that now participants of the show were competing for an investment from him of £250,000, with Sugar becoming their business partner, owning a 50% share, but also providing guidance and support from himself and a team of experts to help develop the winning candidate's plan. Those applying prior to this announcement, were not aware of the prize change until later on. The change was due to the issue involving English and that Sugar was finding it difficult to find roles for the winners. The sixteen candidates who eventually secured a place on the series were revealed on 3 May 2011, via the official website and in a press launch, with the opening episode aired a week later on 10 May.

In a change to format, the final involved the Interviews that candidates undertook, though these included a scrutinising of the candidates' business plans as well. After winning the seventh series, Thomas Pellereau became Sugar's first business partner, whereupon he used his prize to launch a range of manicure products with assistance from Sugar, including a line of curved nail files – the S-file, the S-Buffer and the Emergency File, two curved nail clippers, the S-Clipper and S-Clipper mini and a curved foot exfoliator, and the S-Ped – which were made available with major retailers in the country. While Susan Ma failed to win the series, Sugar said that he liked her plan, later investing into her skincare company Tropic in 2012.

=== Series 8 (2012) ===
The eighth series began on 21 March 2012, and was the last to use the format for the task layout as was used in the previous series. The eighth series was won by Ricky Martin, who used his prize to launch his joint venture recruitment company called Hyper Recruitment Solutions (HRS), on 23 October 2012, which was designed to deal with recruitment in the field of science. Ricky was subsequently invited back to appear on the tenth series as an interviewer.

=== Series 9 (2013) ===
The ninth series began on 7 May 2013, and saw the format of the task layout reverted to its original approach prior to the seventh series, though with the final task amended to focus on the investment prize, in which the finalists of the process had to conduct a presentation of their business idea to a panel of experts, including branding, an advert, and answering any questions given about their proposal. The ninth series was won by Dr. Leah Totton, who used her prize to open her first cosmetic skin clinic on 22 January 2014.

=== Series 10 (2014) ===
Because of the 2014 FIFA World Cup and 2014 Commonwealth Games, the tenth series was postponed until mid-Autumn to avoid clashing with the live coverage of both sporting events. To commemorate the programme's tenth year, the series featured 20 candidates, with two of the tasks dedicated towards the items that had featured within them. The tenth series began on 14 October 2014, was won by Mark Wright, who used his prize to start an SEO business called Climb Online. The series was the last to feature Nick Hewer, who announced his decision to depart from the show during its broadcast, officially confirming it on the series finale, during the You're Hired half of the episode.

=== Series 11 (2015) ===
Due to the 2015 General Election, the show was postponed until mid-Autumn, to avoid clashing with the political event due to Sugar's ties with it at the time. Because of Hewer's departure, Claude Littner was confirmed as his replacement prior to the opening episode of the eleventh series on 14 October 2015, though he retained his role as one of the key interviewers of the Interviews stage. The production staff now focused on applicants who were older and more experienced in business, with the number of candidates taking part now increased to 18. The eleventh series was won by Joseph Valente, who used Lord Sugar's investment and assistance to help him expand his plumbing business, Impra-Gas. The pair worked together on developing the business model for two years, until Valente announced in early 2017 that he intended to go solo and would be assuming full control. Both men parted ways on good terms, with Valente thankful for the help and opportunity that he had received, while Sugar wished him the best of luck and that he would be following the company's progress.

=== Series 12 (2016) ===
As before, the BBC postponed the twelfth series to mid-Autumn, so as to avoid clashing with live coverage of Euro 2016, the 2016 UK EU membership referendum and the 2016 Rio Olympics that were to take place during the Summer. The twelfth series began on 6 October 2016, and was won by Alana Spencer, who used her investment to kickstart a nationwide bakery business called Ridiculously Rich.

=== Series 13 (2017) ===
The thirteenth series of the show was broadcast in late Autumn 2017, maintaining the broadcast schedule set by the previous three series. The thirteenth series began on 4 October 2017, and was won by both James White and Sarah Lynn, making it the first time in the show's history where two finalists were joint winners. Each would go on to use their individual investment to set up their own business – White would use his to start up an IT recruitment firm called Right Time Recruitment, while Lynn would use her investment to start up an online personalised sweets gift service called Sweets in the city.

=== Series 14 (2018) ===
Unlike the last three series of the programme, the fourteenth series, which took place in late Autumn 2018, reverted to involving 16 candidates vying for Sugar's investment offer, and included a number of subtle changes to keep the format fresh such as candidates being sent abroad for the first task. The fourteenth series began on 3 October 2018, and was won by Sian Gabbidon, who used her investment to launch a luxury swimwear range.

=== Series 15 (2019) ===
As with the previous series, the format for the fifteenth incorporated the new changes introduced, including the first task taking place abroad, the number of candidates taking part being at 16, and teams not being named until each consisted of a mix of women and men. The series began airing on 2 October 2019. The fifteenth series was won by Carina Lepore, who used Sugar's investment to fund new stores for her "family-run" baking business across London.

=== Series 16 (2022) ===
The sixteenth series was originally planned for filming to begin in spring 2020, but the onset of the COVID-19 pandemic at that time forced the BBC to postpone production to a later date. In lieu of a new series for their Autumn broadcast schedule, the broadcaster opted to fill the space with a special compilation series of highlights from previous series. In May 2021, it was announced that filming for the sixteenth series would take place later in the year, with the new series intended for broadcast on 6 January 2022. The sixteenth series was won by Harpreet Kaur who used her prize to set up a dessert parlour she would rename Oh So Yum.

=== Series 17 (2023) ===
The seventeenth series aired from 5 January 2023 to 23 March 2023, and this was the second consecutive series with only women present at the interviews stage, and the fourth consecutive series with two women in the final. Marnie Swindells won the seventeenth series.

=== Series 18 (2024) ===
The eighteenth series aired from 1 February 2024 to 18 April 2024 on BBC One. It was originally scheduled to air in January 2024, but it was postponed to February 2024 to avoid the clash with the second series of the rival BBC reality show The Traitors. The eighteenth series was won by Rachel Woolford.

=== Series 19 (2025) ===
The nineteenth series began on 30 January 2025 which coincided with the show's 20th anniversary. The nineteenth series was won by Dean Franklin.

=== Series 20 (2026) ===
The twentieth series aired on 29 January 2026. For the first time since series ten, and the second time overall, there were 20 candidates taking part in the series. The Apprentice: You're Fired! was also reformatted as The Apprentice: Unfinished Business, presented by Angela Scanlon. On 16 April, the twentieth series was won by Karishma Vijay.

=== Series 21 (2027) ===
The twenty-first series is scheduled to air in early 2027.

== Filming ==
=== Schedule ===
Every series of The Apprentice is pre-recorded before it is broadcast. Although the show's twelve-week broadcast schedule gives the impression that the series was filmed over a period of twelve weeks, in reality the whole series is filmed within a two-month period, a few months before broadcast. While the candidates have a break between tasks to relax in the "House", each task is generally performed within a shorter timeframe than it appears on the programme.

Compared to the US series, the British version has a more rigid format that requires the production team to provide enough footage to be incorporated into twelve separate episodes. Early rules in filming meant that multiple firings were not allowed in the first two series, a fact that was acknowledged as an issue by Sugar when he expressed his desire to fire both Alexa Tilley and Syed Ahmed following a task in the second series, but could only get rid of the former. In subsequent series, this rule was changed after the show increased the number of candidates, so that Sugar could conduct double and triple firings.

=== Locations ===
Filming is usually within London or across the UK and occasionally, when tasks take the teams abroad, across Europe, Northern Africa, the Middle East, or the United States. The candidates are provided with accommodation within an upmarket area of London selected by the production team, with each episode's opening and ending scene being filmed there, using a mixture of exterior and interior shots; filming is also done on site if the candidates are working on a task within the building.

For other outdoor shots, the locations have varied. Between the first and third series, both the opening credits and the post-firing "walk of shame" exit sequences were filmed outside the Amstrad HQ building in Brentwood, but from the fourth series onwards, following Amstrad's sale to BSkyB in 2007, these scenes were filmed in front of the Viglen HQ building in St Albans, Hertfordshire, which until that point had been used for the interviews stage of the competition, and continued to be so until 2014, when it was decided to change the location to 122 Leadenhall Street. Between the fourth to ninth series, the Walk of Shame scene was filmed at night, but the tenth series changed to having this done during the afternoon. For the scenes involving the losing team discussing their loss, two cafes were used – "The Bridge" in Acton, West London; and "La Cabana 2" in North London – although editing of these scenes makes it appear that candidates only enter The Bridge cafe.

The show sometimes uses aerial footage of various buildings in London, to act as links between scenes and as part of the opening credits; these have included shots of the Square Mile and Canary Wharf financial districts, as well as the 180-metre Gherkin, HSBC Tower, One Canada Square, the Citigroup Centre, and the Shard.

=== Candidates and tasks ===
Filming of an episode can usually take a considerable amount of time to be done and as such, each task is usually filmed back-to-back, rather than weekly as it appears in the broadcast schedule for a series. For each episode, four television crews are used to follow the candidates during a task, and often are focused on picking up on mistakes and issues between candidates than on their overall performance. The final edit of an episode often trims down a task that took 1–3 days to be done, to fit it within approximately about half of what will be televised for that episode, meaning candidates may appear to make minimal contributions when in reality they made more, while others may not feature as much if Sugar or his advisers feel they did well and completed their duties, as emphasis is often put on moments that can be entertaining for audiences. Often the filming of an episode can hamper the efforts of candidates in a task, due to film crews usually having to get filming permission first from the respective owner of a store or establishment, which can often be a time-consuming and cumbersome process as a result, whilst the strict rules of the BBC on product placement and advertising mean candidates have to approach businesses with care when asking them for help.

Owing to the need for secrecy during the two months of filming, all candidates are made to sign a confidentiality agreement which prohibits all but a few confidants nominated by them to be told of where they will be during that time, which remains active after filming until the series has started broadcast. As part of this agreement, all contact with the outside world is restricted to a high level – each candidate gets a limited phone call once a week, has no access to newspapers, television or internet, and is required to hand in any electronic communication equipment they have (i.e. mobiles) before they begin. In addition, all candidates are made to remain in their accommodation throughout filming except when they must head out for a task, and can only take a day off if they are supervised by a chaperone from the production crew. As a result, the persistent presence of the cameras, the closeness of rivals in the competition and the lack of contact with families and friends, can cause considerable pressure and stress for a candidate between entering the process, to leaving it.

=== Boardroom, 'Walk of Shame" and Final ===
Scenes filmed in both the "boardroom" and the reception area outside the room are in fact done within a custom-built set at Black Island Studios, with the boardroom receptionist actually being an employee of the production company, Talkback Thames, and not Sugar's real secretary. Filming of each candidates' "walk of shame" exit sequences is mainly done towards the beginning of a new series, which can lead to the fired candidate's clothing and hairstyle being different to that in their final boardroom scene before their dismissal from the competition. The post-firing taxi ride that occurs after their departure does not take the candidate home as it appears in the show, but merely takes them around the block to allow their taxi interview to be filmed, after which they are then taken to a local hotel to stay the night before being finally allowed to leave after packing up their belongings from the house.

For the final, multiple endings are filmed for the candidates who make it to the end of the process, although Sugar does not reveal who the winner is until shortly before transmission. This determines which ending is shown as part of the series finale's final edit. Notably, the BBC has released two statements regarding the decision procedure which are considered to be contradictory; while the first states that Sugar makes his decision on the day that the final boardroom sequence is filmed, based on the contestants' performance in the final task, and keeps it secret until just before transmission, the second states that he decides after a six-month trial period. Former candidate, Saira Khan, notably stated that his final decision "is not based on the programme that people see", but is based on "these two people [who] have been working with him for the six months."

== Spin-offs ==
=== The Apprentice: You're Fired! (2006–2025) ===
Following the decision to commission a second series of the programme, the BBC decided to create a spin-off companion programme to accompany The Apprentice, with its format operating in a similar manner to that of Big Brother's Little Brother and Strictly Come Dancing: It Takes Two. Originally aired on BBC Three, before it was moved to BBC Two alongside the main programme's move to BBC One, the show is broadcast alongside the latest series of the main show, with each episode featuring the host and a group of guest panellists – business people related to the task, presenters of TV/radio programmes, and comedians – performing an in-depth look into the recent task of the programme, while also interviewing the most recently fired candidate(s) and analyzing their performance. The shows are recorded at Riverside Studios, and was hosted by Tom Allen 2019 - 2025; it has been previously hosted by Adrian Chiles 2006 - 2009, Dara Ó Briain 2010 - 2014, Jack Dee 2015 and Rhod Gilbert 2016 - 2018.

From 2026, series 20, this format was changed to The Apprentice: Unfinished Business, which is presented by Angela Scanlon. This is done in more of a podcast style with two guests rather than the three from You're Fired.

=== Comic Relief Does The Apprentice (2007, 2009, 2019, 2025) ===
Following the second series of The Apprentice, the BBC announced that, as part of its early-2007 programming schedule, a celebrity version of the programme would be recorded in aid of the charity Comic Relief. Given the title of Comic Relief Does The Apprentice, it functioned differently to the format of the American celebrity edition, The Celebrity Apprentice – while that was filmed to be a full series when it was broadcast, the Comic Relief special functioned on a simple format, in which it featured ten celebrities split between two teams – a "boys' team" and a "girls' team" – and consisted of two parts covering a single task, with any money raised going to the 2007 Comic Relief fund, though retaining certain key elements from the main programme, such as the boardroom scene and Sugar "firing" one of the celebrities. Filming of this special was conducted on 15 December 2006, with the celebrities that participated being Piers Morgan, Alastair Campbell, Cheryl Cole, Danny Baker, Jo Brand, Karren Brady, Maureen Lipman, Ross Kemp, and Trinny Woodall; the special also featured Rupert Everett, though he was later replaced by Series 1 winner, Timothy Campbell, after he left on the first day of the task. The two part special aired on 15 and 16 March 2007 on BBC One, the second part as a film segment for Red Nose Day 2007, with the celebrities raising over £1 million for charity.

A section celebrity edition of the show was made for Comic Relief two years later in 2009, with the two-part special of Comic Relief Does The Apprentice airing on 12 and 13 March 2009, with the celebrities that participated being Alan Carr, Jack Dee, Gerald Ratner, Jonathan Ross, Gok Wan, Michelle Mone, Patsy Palmer, Fiona Phillips, Carol Vorderman and Ruby Wax. Although Ross had been suspended by the BBC over the prank telephone call row that occurred during the time that the special was being filmed, the broadcaster permitted him to appear in it due to the fact that it would be airing after his suspension had been lifted.

On 22 February 2019, it was announced that Comic Relief Does The Apprentice would return after a ten-year hiatus. Two episodes, The Cabaret Task and The Boardroom, aired on the 7 and 8 March 2019 respectively.

In December 2024, it was reported that the celebrity version would return as The Celebrity Apprentice in late 2025 to mark the show's 20th anniversary. The show aired on 29 and 30 December 2025 with the celebrities participating being Angela Scanlon, AJ Odudu, Jake Wood, JB Gill, Sarah Hadland, Tom Skinner, Shazia Mirza, Matt Morsia, Kadeena Cox, Eddie Kadi, Charlie Hedges and Rob Rinder.

=== The Apprenticast (2007–2009) ===
The beginning of the third series saw the launch of a weekly podcast called The Apprenticast, and a radio programme on BBC Radio 5 Live, both hosted by former Blue Peter presenter Richard Bacon and running for thirty minutes. Both programmes featured former candidates being questioned by members of the public, comedians, and those who work in business. Some critics have described Bacon's performance as better than that of Adrian Chiles, who presented the similar, but television-based, programme The Apprentice: You're Fired!

For the 2009 series, an independent weekly podcast was also released, hosted by first series contestant James Max, in conjunction with London talk station LBC (on which Max hosts his own show).

=== Sport Relief Does The Apprentice (2008) ===
After the first Comic Relief celebrity version proved a success, the BBC gave the green light for another edition the following year for Sport Relief 2008. Designed once again as a two-part special called Sport Relief Does The Apprentice, it was aired on 12 and 14 March 2008, and functioned on the same format as the Comic Relief version. For the Sport Relief edition, the celebrities that participated were Phil Tufnell, Nick Hancock, Lembit Öpik, Kelvin MacKenzie, Hardeep Singh Kohli, Lisa Snowdon, Jacqueline Gold, Louise Redknapp, Clare Balding and Kirstie Allsopp.

=== Young Apprentice (2010–2012) ===
As the main programme began to grow in success, Sugar took notice of the number of young viewers the show was attracting, and went into discussions with the BBC in March 2008 to propose the creation of a junior spin-off of the show, featuring a young age-group of candidates and being aired in an early evening timeslot on BBC One. Despite a lack of interest, Sugar went into negotiations on the idea in early 2009, whereupon the BBC gave the green light for the project after the idea was revised. In May 2009, while the fifth series of The Apprentice was underway, the broadcaster announced the spin-off's production during an episode of The Apprentice: You're Fired! with news that it had begun an application process aimed at young candidates aged between sixteen and seventeen. Both the filming schedule and the format of the spin-off differed greatly with the main show, with the most notable differences being that Sugar was gentler with the young candidates when firing them from the spin-off, the candidates faced mainly standard tasks and no interviews, and the winner received a £25,000 investment from Sugar to fund their further education and future prospects.

The first series of the programme began on 12 May 2010, under the title of Junior Apprentice, consisted of 10 candidates split evenly between gender, and ran for a total of six episodes. It also marked the debut of Karren Brady as Margaret Mountford's replacement, after she left the main show following the fifth series; Brady would later begin her first appearance on The Apprentice at the start of its sixth series. The spin-off later led to the BBC commissioning two more series, though with a few changes – the show was renamed as Young Apprentice, with the number of candidates increased to twelve and the number of episodes increased to eight. The second series began airing on 24 October 2011, while the third began on 1 November 2012.

The spin-off was eventually cancelled after its third series, after Sugar revealed on his Twitter account in February 2013 that the BBC had decided to not renew Young Apprentice for another series.

== Special programmes ==
=== Series ===
The following is a list of specials that have aired alongside the majority of the series:

- The Apprentice: The Final Five is a documentary special which first aired alongside the third series under the title, The Apprentice: Beyond the Boardroom. The programme focuses on the remaining final five contestants who have made it into the final stages of the competition, in which each candidate is interviewed about their overall performance at that stage, as well as their personal interests and past experiences. Along with interviews with the candidates, the programme also features each candidate's close friends, family members, including parents, children, and partners, and Sugar's advisers, each airing their views and opinions on the candidate currently being talked about. This special did not appear during Series 17, 18, and 19.
- The Apprentice: Why I Fired Them is a documentary special which first aired alongside the third series, and focuses on Sugar looking back over the current series, and discussing the merits and shortcomings of the candidates he fired up to the time the programme is aired. Joined by his advisers, he explains in more detail about why he fired each candidate at each stage of the competition, whilst reviewing the performances of the finalists for that series. For the seventh series, the programme was not broadcast, but instead was replaced with documentary special, How To Get Hired, presented by Dara Ó Briain. This special did not appear during Series 17, 18, and 19.

=== Specials ===
The following is a list of programmes that were one-offs:

- The Apprentice: Tim in the Firing Line was an hour-long documentary that aired on 19 February 2006, prior to the launch of the second series. The programme followed Tim Campbell, the winner of Series One, during the first twelve months of the job that he had won, in which he worked within Amstrad's health and beauty division, and was tasked with bringing to market a new anti-wrinkle product, named The Integra. The programme also documented the reaction of Campbell's family, including mother Una Campbell, fiancée Jasmine Johnson, and daughter Kayla Campbell. As a result of his impressive performance, he was offered a permanent position within Amstrad. Sugar later said that Campbell's job would not have been in danger had he failed to make the product a success, and that the project was a "joint responsibility".
- The Apprentice: The Worst Decisions Ever was a one-off special that was screened on BBC Two on 3 April 2008. It focussed on Sugar revisiting some of the moments over the past four series at that time, and the decisions that candidates had made that he deemed the worst he had seen.
- The Apprentice: Motor Mouths was a one-off special that was screened on BBC Two on 18 April 2008, and featured interviews with celebrity fans and former contenders who remembered candidates, described as "motor mouths", who only just failed to make it to the finals.
- The Apprentice Best Bits was a compilation series that was screened on BBC One on 1 October 2020. The series featured six episodes, focussed on highlights from the previous fifteen series of the main programme and was created as a replacement for a new series in 2020 due to the coronavirus pandemic.

=== Parodies and imitations ===
The show has been imitated in the ITV programme Harry Hill's TV Burp. It was also mocked in the BBC impression programme Dead Ringers, in which Sir Alan Sugar turns fired contestants into frogs and the candidates are portrayed as failed applicants of Strictly Come Dancing and Big Brother who are seeking their 15 minutes of fame.

Rory Bremner did an impression of Sir Alan on the show Bremner Bird and Fortune; he was in the boardroom with the main London Mayoral candidates, Boris Johnson, Ken Livingstone and Brian Paddick, and after each of the candidates failed to get a single vote according to his results, he hired himself for the job claiming he "would make a profit on City Hall". In Dead Ringers Bremner also impersonated a Sir Alan with magic powers castigating a contestant over an event akin to what occurred to The Sorcerer's Apprentice.

In early 2007, the show was mocked in the television programme Kombat Opera Presents The Applicants. The series has been lampooned on the Boleg Bros website, where it is shot in Lego. Paul Merton and Ian Hislop also parodied the show during a promotional advert for the 2007 and 2008 series of Have I Got News for You.

In June 2007, shortly after the conclusion of Series Three of The Apprentice, rival UK channel ITV began airing Tycoon, described in The Times as "a shameless rip-off of The Apprentice". Mark Thompson, The BBC's director general, accused ITV of "copycatting" and said that Tycoon was "very like The Apprentice, and there's possibly a bit of Dragons' Den in there". The series followed Dragons' Den star Peter Jones' search for a new business tycoon. It proved relatively unsuccessful and was removed from a prime time slot on Tuesdays after achieving fewer than 2 million viewers, over 2.5 million below the channel's average. The final episode attracted just 1.3 million viewers. The programme's winner, Iain Morgan, won a prize of over £200,000.

In the fourth series of Charlie Brooker's Screenwipe, Brooker parodied The Apprentice, with Brooker taking on the role of a Sugar-like character dressed in a crown and gown, and replacing the catchphrase, "You're fired" with "You're fucked." Brooker later produced another parody, as part of the Aspiration episode of How TV Ruined Your Life entitled The Underling. In this parody, Roger Sloman portrays a Sugar-like figure who berates children for their poor attempts to set up a lemonade stand.

The children's comedy sketch show Horrible Histories features "Historical Apprentice" as a recurring sketch. This directly references "The Apprentice" and Sugar, and features two different teams from different historical periods.

Sugar starred in a mock clip of The Apprentice within the 2012 Doctor Who episode, "The Power of Three".

Series have expanded outside television with a number of University student groups recreating local competitions by sticking to the format of tasks. What is known as Student Apprentice competitions have been hosted across the country in a number of universities, especially in London. Events became so popular competitions joined as Regional Student Apprentice in London and other regions in UK. In 2013, these were joined to form National Student Apprentice, which became a competition bringing together six regions for a national event.

In May 2014, Harry & Paul's Story of the Twos parodied the show, with Harry Enfield as Sugar.

== Reception ==
=== Praise ===
The programme has been given positive reviews by several newspapers. In the popular press, The Sun newspaper has called it "The thinking man's reality show", and The Daily Mirror described it as "jaw-dropping viewing". Broadsheet newspapers have given the programme a similarly positive reception, with The Daily Telegraph calling it "The most addictive show in years", and The Guardian saying that it provided "A salutary lesson in aggressive buying and selling, hiring and firing". The Sunday Times said that it was "not just a game show: it's a business school." The Evening Standard was also favourable, describing the programme as "terribly compelling".

According to a report released by Ernst & Young in August 2013, the rise of popular television programmes like The Apprentice, have helped to encourage and foster an entrepreneurial culture across the UK. The report revealed that 71% of entrepreneurs surveyed thought the UK encourages an entrepreneurial spirit.

=== Criticism ===
The programme has been criticised in the British media for suggesting that success in the business world requires possession of unsavoury qualities. Terence Blacker of The Independent newspaper, for example, said that he believed that the programme falsely linked success with being "nasty, disloyal, greedy and selfish". Talk show host Michael Parkinson also expressed misgivings about the programme, describing it as being "full of vulgar, loud people who, for all the wrong reasons, are dobbing each other in".

The premise of the series itself has been called into question by some members of the business world. Steve Carter, the head of recruitment firm Nigel Lynn, described the "brutality" of the recruitment process as being unrealistic.

None of the winners of the first six series of The Apprentice stayed with Sugar's companies permanently, some remaining only for a matter of weeks, leading it to be criticised as "an entertainment show with no real aspect of business to it". In response to these criticisms, a spokesperson for The Apprentice has been quoted as saying "The show isn't designed as a tool for recruiters... but it does highlight and thoroughly test key business skills such as leadership, teamwork, dedication and strategic thinking – integral skills most recruiters are looking for".

Former runner-up Saira Khan has criticised the programme because the final two candidates both work with Sir Alan Sugar for a few months before he decides whom he will hire. Khan stated that "Sir Alan Sugar's final decision is not based on the programme that people see, his final decision is based on these two people who have been working with him for the six months." Khan also said that the series is more concerned with giving viewers a rags-to-riches ending than employing the most able candidate, and that the series promotes bullying in the workplace. The series has been notably edited afterwards to portray the winner in a different light. This has led to some viewers correctly guessing the winner of the series partway through the series.

Former contestants Lucinda Ledgerwood and James Max have criticised the tasks on the programme as being too heavily sales-focussed and designed for entertainment rather than as tests of all-round business skills.

A number of people have also criticised the editing and production methods of the series. Contestants Syed Ahmed and Tre Azam accused the series of dumbing down their appearances for entertainment. Alan Sugar revealed in his autobiography (but did not criticise) that the boardroom scenes are edited to create tension. Jokes and light hearted encounters are cut out, and Alan is seen "banging the table".

Media Watch has voiced concerns over inclusion of company names and products such as Chrysler in the programme, accusing the producers of breaking BBC policy regarding product placement. Despite these claims, Talkback Thames has denied any suggestion of product placement.

Runner up of the eleventh series, Vana Koutsomitis criticised the living conditions that candidates live in; despite being granted accommodation in a lavish house, Vana claimed that programme bosses imposed living conditions similar to Big Brother, with strict rules and zero contact with outsiders.

She said: "They just throw you into a house and tell you that you have no phone, no internet and you'll have no contact with the outside world, you can only talk to your family once a week for 10 minutes and that's monitored. And we weren't allowed to go to Boots to grab something. We had to be monitored and guided there." She continued: "I think that element of cabin fever and psychological torture is not necessary for a business competition. I don't believe that you need to isolate people. I think you can gauge people's business skills without putting them in that environment.

Vana's criticism of the living conditions that candidates live in which they have zero contact with outsiders was also brought up a year later by contestant Aleksandra King, who left the process during the fourth task. Following her departure, she remarked: "I can't tell you in exact detail how much contact I was allowed with my family but, for me, the restricted contact was not good enough. I would have liked to have picked up the phone and just said, "How are you guys? OK, Great." I was not able to do that. I've got a nine-year-old, a seven-year-old and a five-year-old but it's the work-life balance thing because there are other mums in there who have younger kids and it was OK for them. But for me, I started to get slightly irritated because I felt like why is this even a business tip, what has lack of contact with my family got to do with it? It was winding me up and going on in my head". King later remarked that The Apprentice includes a "blame culture" and the atmosphere "wasn't necessarily great for business".

=== Viewing figures ===
Throughout the programme's history, The Apprentice has received high viewing figures with each series. When its first series was broadcast in 2005 on BBC Two, it attracted an average of 2.5 million viewers per episode, with an audience share of 11% for its timeslot that allowed it to beat popular programmes being aired on rival channels at the time, such as Desperate Housewives. By the following year, the second series achieved a far higher average of 4.4 million viewers and an audience share of 27%, surpassing those achieved from the live broadcast of the 2005 UEFA Cup Final and other televised programming, such as the film Pearl Harbor.

Viewing figures continued to improve upon the programme being switched to BBC One and a more mainstream audience, with the third series attracting an average of 5.62 million viewers per episode, at an audience share of 27%, surpassing the ratings achieved by programmes, at the time, such as City Lights, Grand Designs and Big Brother. Notably, opening and finale episodes also attracted favourable ratings – the premiere episode of the fourth series achieved around 6.4 million viewers, with the finale reaching a peak figure of 9.7 million. Even special editions of the programme proved a rating success – Comic Relief Does The Apprentice attracted 6.72 million viewers when it was broadcast prior to the third series, becoming the fifth most-watched programme on BBC One the week it aired.

=== Awards ===
The Apprentice won the British Academy of Film and Television Arts (BAFTA) for "Best Feature" during the 2006 awards, beating Top Gear, Ramsay's Kitchen Nightmares and Dragons' Den. It was also nominated for a BAFTA for "Best Feature" at the 2007 awards, but was beaten by The Choir.

Other awards that the programme has won include:

- 2009 Televisual Bulldog Awards – Best Reality Event
- 2009 Televisual Bulldog Awards – Best in Show
- 2009 Broadcasting Press Guild – Best Factual Entertainment Programme
- 2009 Media Guardian Edinburgh International TV Festival – Terrestrial Programme of the Year
- 2009 TV Quick/TV Choice Awards – Best Reality
- 2009 Broadcast Award – Best Entertainment Programme
- 2008 Media Guardian Edinburgh International TV Festival – Terrestrial Programme of the Year
- 2008 TV Quick/TV Choice Awards – Best Reality
- 2007 Royal Television Society (RTS) Award – Features and Factual Entertainment
- 2007 Broadcast Award – Best Entertainment Programme
- 2006 BAFTA – Pioneer Award (voted for by the public)
- 2006 Rose d'Or – Reality Show
- 2006 Televisual Bulldog Awards – Best Factual Reality Show
- 2006 TV Quick/TV Choice Awards – Best Reality
- 2006 The Guild of TV Cameramen Awards – Camera Team Excellence in Photography
- 2006 Banff – Unscripted Entertainment Programme
- 2006 Wincott Business Awards – Best TV Show of the Year
- 2005 RTS Craft and Design Award – Tape and Film Editing
- 2005 RTS Craft and Design Award – Tape and Film Editing, Entertainment and Situation Comedy
- 2005 Grierson Awards – Most Entertaining Documentary

== Merchandise ==
On 10 February 2005, Sugar released a book to coincide with the first series, called The Apprentice: How to Get Hired Not Fired. On 16 February 2006, the book was revised with additional information relating to the second series. An official magazine was first released on 23 May 2007. It includes items about business, interviews with candidates from the programme and other Apprentice-related features.

The Apprentice has included various pieces of classical and popular music throughout. Numerous pieces from film soundtracks are used as well as music featured in the BBC TV series Doctor Who. Examples of the music used include the opening theme ("Dance of the Knights" from Romeo and Juliet by Prokofiev) and "The Boardroom", "You're Fired" and "Closing Credits" from The Apprentice (Original Theme) by Dru Masters. An official soundtrack was released on 4 June 2007. At the beginning of the first episode of Series 6, the iconic string phrase from the first movement of Gustav Mahler's Sixth Symphony can be heard in, one might surmise, a numerological nod. Further episodes in Series 6, include an extract from a piece by the French composer and pianist, Erik Satie, (from his "Gymnopédies No 1"), music from the Disney-Pixar 2009 film, Up, composed by Michael Giacchino, and a famous extract from Benjamin Britten's opera, Peter Grimes. A number of episodes also featured brief snippets of several tracks from The Sims series of games, such as the neighbourhood theme from The Sims 3, was briefly used in the last episode of series 6 and one of the build tracks from Makin' Magic was used in Series 7 episode 8.

In 2009, a DVD called "The Apprentice: The Best of Series 1–4" was released.
