= Carina Lepore =

British entrepreneur

- Born: Croydon, London, England
- Education: Harris City Academy Crystal Palace
- Occupation: Businesswoman • media personality
- Website: www.doughbakehouse.co.uk

Carina Lepore is a British businesswoman and media personality. She is best known for being the 15th winner of The Apprentice. After winning the show, Lepore entered into a 50:50 partnership with Lord Sugar with bakery business Dough Artisan Bakehouse.

== Early life ==
Lepore was a student at Harris City Academy Crystal Palace from 1998 to 2004, subsequently leaving education when she was 18. After leaving school, Lepore opened a fashion store in Croydon and later went onto to work for retailer Marks and Spencer for ten years. Lepore left her job at M&S in 2017 to join her father's bakery business in Herne Hill, following an incident which caused the site to burn down. In an interview with The Times, Lepore said: "In large part to help Dad, who was at an all-time low."

== The Apprentice ==
In 2019, Lepore won the 15th series of British reality TV show The Apprentice. After winning the show, she entered into a 50:50 partnership with Lord Sugar, which ended in 2023 following a mutual agreement. He invested £250,000 into Lepore's bakery business.

Lepore became the most successful Apprentice candidate in history, winning nine out of ten tasks and three of which as the project manager.

After winning The Apprentice, Lepore told the Press Association, "It's like this euphoric relief. I was so overwhelmed and so happy. It's a feeling that I haven't really felt."

== Dough Artisan Bakehouse ==
On 8 September 2020, Lepore held a press launch for her second bakery which was opened in Beckenham in South East London.

During the same month as the launch, a local newspaper reported police were called to Lepore's Beckenham bakery, following complaints raised by residents over a private party which disobeyed coronavirus regulations.

In August 2023, it was reported that Lord Sugar parted ways with Lepore after nearly four years of being in business together. A spokesperson for Lord Sugar said: "Both parties agreed it was the right decision for the business moving forward, and Carina will take back full control of her business with immediate effect."
