= Sian Gabbidon =

British entrepreneur

- Born: Sian Marie Gabbidon; 28 October 1992 (age 33); Leeds, England
- Education: University of Huddersfield
- Known for: Winner of The Apprentice

Sian Marie Gabbidon (born 28 October 1992) is a British businesswoman, fashion designer and media personality. In 2018, Gabbidon won Series 14 of The Apprentice.

== Early life and education ==
Gabbidon was born in Leeds, Yorkshire on 28 October 1992. She attended Corpus Christi Catholic College and sixth form at the Garforth Academy. She had a passion for football prior to starting high-school, and she played the sport extensively before "switching to fashion" as a teenager. From 2011 to 2014, she attended the University of Huddersfield and graduated with First Class Honours in Fashion Marketing with Design and Production. While studying at university, Gabbidon began designing and producing her own swimwear and selling it online.

== Career ==
In 2016, Gabbidon launched her own swimwear and fashion brand "Sian Marie" which became an equal partnership with Alan Sugar after winning The Apprentice. Initially selling through its website, the brand expanded to sell through ASOS.

Gabbidon said that her business role model is Coco Chanel who she identifies with as Chanel "came from nothing and worked her way to the top".

=== The Apprentice ===
In 2018, Gabbidon won the 14th series of British reality TV show The Apprentice, defeating nut milk brand owner Camila Ainsworth. After winning the show, she entered into an equal business partnership with Lord Sugar, who had invested £250,000 into the winners' business. On her win, Gabbidon said: “I can’t believe it’s happened. Not that I didn’t think I could win it but it’s just real. It’s crazy. I’m absolutely over the moon.”
