= Claude Littner =

British businessman (born 1949)

- Born: Claude Manuel Littner; 4 May 1949 (age 77); New York City, U.S.
- Citizenship: British (1990–present); American (1949–2018)
- Occupation: Businessman
- Known for: The Apprentice
- Spouse: Thelma Littner (m. 1976)
- Children: 2

Claude Manuel Littner (born 4 May 1949) is a British business executive and the former chairman of Viglen, Powerleague, ASCO and Azzuri Communications. He is also the deputy chairman of Blacks Leisure and former chief executive of Tottenham Hotspur. He is also known from his appearances on the British version of The Apprentice, interviewing for his former boss Alan Sugar. Littner was one of Sugar's aides between 2015 and 2019.

== Early life ==
Claude Manuel Littner was born on 4 May 1949 in New York City, to an American mother and an Austrian-Jewish father, who had fled the Nazis in the 1930s. His father worked as a chemical engineer. The family immigrated to the United Kingdom soon after Littner's birth. Littner holds British citizenship, and is fluent in French. He is a practising Jew.

== Career ==
After working in accountancy, Littner developed a career as a turnaround specialist. In the early 1990s, Littner was chairman and chief executive of Amstrad International, Amstrad Spain and Dancall Telecom.

Littner served as a non-executive chairman of Azzurri Communications and was deputy chairman of Blacks Leisure Group from August 2008 to July 2009. He was executive chairman of the international oilfield support services business ASCO from 2004 to 2007 and served as director of Norton Way Motors Ltd and Myeloma UK.

A non-executive director of Amstrad since June 2007, in 2009 Sugar resigned a majority of his UK company directorships, handing over his former management duties to Littner, including the chairman's post at Viglen.

Littner has said that he "happens to have a knack for business" and has said a good thing about working with Alan Sugar is that "he gave me opportunities. To him, I was untested, untried, and he gave me a lot of responsibility."

=== Football ===
Littner was the chief executive of Tottenham Hotspur starting in 1993 and resigned his position in 2001.

Littner bought into Powerleague, a five-a-side football centre operator in 2001. After leading a management buyout from 3i Group in 2003, it floated on AIM in 2006. The company was taken over in 2009 by Patron Capital and he netted some £50m.

=== The Apprentice ===
Littner came to wider UK public recognition through his direct and confrontational style of job interviewing on The Apprentice. He is the only interviewer to have appeared in this role in every series of the programme.

On 27 April 2015, it was announced that Littner had replaced Nick Hewer as Alan Sugar's aide on the show. He started when the 2015 series began on 14 October 2015, and he continues to interview the candidates.

He took a hiatus from the programme for its sixteenth series due to injuries sustained from a cycling accident in 2021, with series one winner Tim Campbell taking over for the sixteenth series. Littner returned to the show for the first episode of the seventeenth series, but was not well enough to continue. His place was taken by Tim Campbell for the following 10 episodes. He returned to the programme in 2025 for the interviews only.

== Honours ==
In October 2014, the University of West London's Business School was renamed the Claude Littner Business School in appreciation of his contributions to the university. It was opened and unveiled by long-time associate and colleague, Alan Sugar. In April 2015 the University of West London appointed him a visiting professor.

== Personal life ==
Since 1976 Littner has been married to Thelma. They have two sons, Anthony and Alex, and five grandchildren.

In 1997, at the age of 48, Littner was diagnosed with Non-Hodgkin lymphoma and was initially given six months to live.He has since recovered and is a trustee in Blood Cancer UK.

In 2016 Littner published his autobiography titled "Single-Minded: My Life in Business".

Littner renounced American citizenship in 2018.
