= The Interns Show =

- Created by: Allied Insurance
- Presented by: Aminath Raushan
- Judges: Ibrahim Hussain Shihab, Aminath Shaneez Saeed and Mr. Mohamed Naseem
- Country of origin: Maldives
- Original language: Dhivehi
- No. of seasons: 1
- No. of episodes: 3

Original release
- Network: Television Maldives
- Release: March 28, 2012 – present

Related
- Think Associates; The Apprentice (TV series)

The Interns presented by Allied Insurance, is a reality TV show designed to seek potential talent and skill for the marketing and advertising industry. In each episode teams will be assigned projects related to marketing, including social media & cause marketing. Each team consists of 5 students from each institute. The winning team will be rewarded with a guaranteed job from Allied Insurance & sponsors along with other prizes. During the show other companies can also express interest for specific interns (including those eliminated) and these will be updated in every show.

== Format ==
=== Candidate Selection ===
Candidates are chosen by their respected institutions. Each institution have to select 5 member team to represent their institution.

=== Tasks ===
Two competing teams will get the same task to do but in different location. Locations are selected by a lucky draw in the briefing. After the briefing teams go to planning stage where they are given certain amount of time to prepare their business and marketing plan and present that to their team mates. The following day and in some cases same day teams will be heading into the field to complete their task according to the plan which they have created.

=== Boardroom ===
After completion of the task, the teams report back to the "boardroom". Where they will be judged on how they have performed their task and its relevance to the business plan which teams have created. At the end of the boardroom one team will get eliminated and the winner will progress to the next round.

=== Grand Finale ===
Grand Finale will be held at Dharubaaruge and will be aired live on Television Maldives. Before the "Grand Finale" two finalists will play a bonus round in which elimination will not happen.

=== Schedule ===
Unlike most reality television programmes, the whole of The Interns Show is pre-recorded. Show will be aired on national television Television Maldives on every Thursday night 22:00-23:00 (GMT +5).

== Participants ==
=== Clique College ===
Mohamed Rashid, Ahmed Reehan, Shifaz Ahmed, Fathimath Abdulla and Aishath Nuha

=== Cyryx College ===
Aminath Nafa, Ibrahim Shimau, Hussian Hamdhaan Abdullah, Ali Fahmy and Ali Shaheem

=== CHSE ===
Ali Aslam, Mariyam Hana, Ahmed Nashiu Naeem, Mohamed Sameer and Jayyidha Badhury

=== Faculty of Hospitality and Tourism Studies ===
Shaina Ahmed, Ali Ashham, Aminath Inaya, Aminath Sithura and Imthinan A. Ghafoor

=== Faculty of Management and Computing ===
Ahmed Izzath Abdullah, Fathmath Hanaan Ahmed, Ahmed Shafiu, Ahmed Farish and Aishath Asifa

=== MAPS College ===
Shafiya Ismail, Jazlaan Shareef, Nivaan Ahmed, Mariyam Nashfa and Ibrahim Shiyam

=== Male' Business School ===
Ahmed Fuad (MBS Student), Aanisa Hassan, Jumana Niyaz, Guraisha Moosa and Mohamed Mausoom

=== Villa College ===
Mohamed Amjad, Fathman Shinana, Mohamed Zeehan, Ismail Shah Adam and Bushra A. Wahhab

== Transmissions ==
=== Original series ===
Series	Start date	End date	Episodes
1	28 March 2012		4

== Similar programs ==
- The Apprentice (British TV series), with Lord Alan Sugar
- The Apprentice Australia, with Mark Bouris
- The Benefactor, with Mark Cuban of the NBA Dallas Mavericks
- The Rebel Billionaire, with Richard Branson of the Virgin Group
- The Law Firm with Roy Black
- Fire Me... Please/The Sack Race, where contestants try to get fired from their job
- My Big Fat Obnoxious Boss, a parody and hoax
- Win In China
- The Apprentice (Irish TV series), with Bill Cullen
- The Apprentice New Zealand
- Diili, with Hjallis Harkimo
- The CfC-Stanbic Bank Magnate, also known as The Magnate, Kenyan Business Reality Show
