= The Apprentice (franchise) =

TV series franchise

- Created by: Mark Burnett
- Original work: The Apprentice
- Owner: MGM Television
- Years: 2004–present

Films and television
- Television series: The Apprentice (independent international versions, see below)

Miscellaneous
- Genre: Reality talent game show
- First aired: 8 January 2004; 22 years ago
- Distributor: Fremantle

The Apprentice is a reality talent game show franchise that originally aired in 2004 in the United States.

Created by Mark Burnett, the show depicts contestants from around the country with various professional backgrounds in an elimination-style competition to become an apprentice to a businessman. The show was originally hosted by Donald Trump, who was also one of the producers. Burnett developed the show after previous success in bringing Survivor to the United States. Since its premiere, The Apprentice has spawned several licensed international versions as well as unlicensed imitations.

== Format ==
The following description of the show is based primarily on the American version of The Apprentice, though the general format applies to all other versions.

Each season begins with a new group of contestants vying to earn a place in one of the organizations run by the host. The contestants (who are referred to as "candidates") have come from business backgrounds in various enterprises, including real estate, accounting, restaurant management, management consulting, sales and marketing.

The candidates are divided into two teams or "corporations" within the show. These corporations select a name they are subsequently referred to through the rest of the show. Each week, the teams are assigned a task and required to select one of their members to lead the team as "project manager", who is to take responsibility for organizing the team and making executive decisions. Tasks are generally business oriented and tend to highlight one of several business skills. Tasks most commonly revolve around sales (selling the most items or earning the most money) and marketing (producing a specific marketing material or campaign that is judged by a company's executives). During the tasks, the teams are usually visited by one of the host's "advisors" for that week. Tasks typically last for one or two days. In the global ONE Championship edition, an additional physical task is added before a business task, with candidates partaking physical challenges for various rewards and advantages, though usually meant to train and showcase candidates of physical prowess.

Business tasks followed with boardroom meetings. At the end of each task, the remaining candidates on both teams gather in the boardroom to be briefed on the task by the host and the advisors. Team members are asked about how the task went and whether there were any strong or weak players. Teams are sometimes asked to comment on materials or products produced by the opposing team. The host or advisors would usually provide future advice to candidates on improvement or address any criticisms, followed by the results for the task; members from the winning team are immune from elimination and depending on season, are being permitted to view the next stage of the boardroom on the TV in their suite.

Members from the losing team remain in/return to the boardroom and are confronted with their loss from the hosts, who are then interrogated as to the reasons for their loss and which players contributed to it or failed at the task. The project manager is asked to select a certain number of teammates (typically two, but on occasion one or three) to bring back into the final-stage boardroom meeting, though in some cases the host can overrule their decision to choose candidates instead if they see fit. These selected teammates then step out of the boardroom momentarily so the host can consult with the advisors.

Upon returning to the boardroom for the final stage, the host and the advisors continue interrogating the remaining players on their defeats. The project manager is sometimes further interrogated about their choice of teammates to bring back into the boardroom, and explain their reasons of their choices and any pleas to stay on the competition if required. Usually, the host would eliminate any candidates who have performed poorly in both the task and overall consistency from the show (via its iconic catchphrase of "you're fired" or any words or phrases that are synonymous herein) and has broad discretion to eliminate candidates outside of this usual process, including firing multiple candidates at a time and/or firing someone on the spot prior to the final boardroom; occasionally, the host may even cancel any elimination if the candidates performed with satisfactory standards. The eliminated candidates are shown leaving the boardroom with their luggage and entering a taxi cab, during which they are given time to recount on their elimination that is shown over the episode's credits; the host would usually explain any reasons for eliminating the candidate before or after their firing if required.

Numerous weeks (in the case where a "corporation" had uneven number of candidates) may result in a corporate restructuring by reassigning candidates to a different team, which usually determined by the host itself, though in some cases candidates can choose who they want to be transferred with. When no more than five candidates remain (typically three or four depending on season), these candidates go through a final phase of the competition where they would go through a series of small business tasks, unified as a team to work as a whole (as first seen in ONE Championship), and/or faced an interview with the executives, based on various companies interview the finalists and report their assessments to the host. Based on the interviews and tasks, along with the candidate's track record, if applicable, the host will select two candidates to compete in the finale.

The final two candidates are then each assigned a different final task. Each is given a support team of previously eliminated candidates. Final tasks generally require the finalists to organize (to various degrees) an event such as a party or a fundraiser which has multiple planning elements. Another boardroom takes place and the candidates had to plead on their case on why they deserve to win. Ultimately, one candidate will be "hired" (named the winner) as the titular Apprentice, with the winner offered a starting contract (usually a year valued at $250,000) to work with the company.

== Original series ==
The American version of The Apprentice is the first version of the reality game show franchise. It was broadcast on NBC and billed as "The Ultimate Job Interview". The show depicted a group of 15–18 businessmen and -women competing in an elimination competition for a one-year, US$250,000 contract to run one of real estate magnate Donald Trump's companies.

The first season aired during the winter and spring of 2004, executive-produced by Mark Burnett, Jay Bienstock, and Trump, who also hosts the show. The show led Trump to become known for his fateful catch phrase "You're Fired!". The theme song for the show is "For the Love of Money" by The O'Jays, and other themes and underscore are written by composers Mark T. Williams and Jeff Lippencott of Ah2 Music.

During Donald Trump's reign over the show, the contestants lived communally in a suite at Trump Tower in New York City and the boardroom showdown was with Trump and two of his associates (usually Carolyn Kepcher, former chief operating officer (COO) and general manager for the Trump National Golf Club, and George H. Ross, Executive Vice President and Senior Counsel, The Trump Organization). Season 6 saw the show move to Los Angeles. On May 14, 2007, NBC announced the show was not on its fall 2007 schedule, but that a decision to cancel or renew it had not yet been made. On May 19, 2007, Trump announced that he was "moving on from The Apprentice", effectively ending the series. However, on May 22, NBC responded by saying Trump still had a year left on his contract. On July 16, 2007, NBC renewed the show with a sequel series, The Celebrity Apprentice, The sequel debuted with season seven on January 3, 2008. The eighth season of The Apprentice premiered on NBC on March 1, 2009. Similar to the previous season, all contestants were celebrities playing for charity. The ninth season of The Apprentice began in Spring 2010, also featuring a celebrity cast.

In June 2015, Trump announced his campaign to run for President of the United States of America. He was accused of making several racially-charged remarks during his speech and was subsequently fired by NBC. Actor and former Governor of California Arnold Schwarzenegger replaced Trump, beginning in Season 15.

== International versions ==
There are currently over 70 winners of the format, the first being Bill Rancic of the United States.

=== Overview ===
- Currently airing
- An upcoming airing
- Status unknown
- No longer airing

Area	Name	Host	Channel	Catchphrase	Winners
Global	The Apprentice: ONE Championship Edition	Chatri Sityodtong	AXN Asia	You're not the "ONE"!	S1, 2021: Jessica Ramella
African Union	The Apprentice Africa	Biodun Shobanjo	NTA; TV3; KTN; WBS; TBC1		S1, 2008: Isaac Dankyi-Koranteng
Asia	The Apprentice Asia	Tony Fernandes	Asia	You're fired!	S1, 2013: Jonathan Allen Yabut
Arab World	الإدارة جدارة; Al Idara Jadara	Mohamed Ali Alabbar	LBC		S1, 2005: Cancelled
Australia	The Apprentice Australia	Mark Bouris (2009-2015); Alan Sugar (2021-2022)	Nine	You're fired!	S1, 2009: Andrew Morello
Australia	The Celebrity Apprentice Australia	Mark Bouris (2009-2015); Alan Sugar (2021-2022)	Nine	You're fired!	S1, 2011: Julia Morris; S2, 2012: Ian "Dicko" Dickson; S3, 2013: Stephanie Rice; S4, 2015: Sophie Monk; S5, 2021: Shaynna Blaze; S6, 2022: Benji Marshall
Belgium	De Topmanager	Rob Heyvaert	VT4		S1, 2006: Claudia Schiepers
Brazil	O Aprendiz	Roberto Justus	Record TV	Você está demitido!	S1, 2004: Vivianne Ventura; S2, 2005: Fabio Porcel; S3, 2006: Anselmo Martini; S4, 2007: Tiago Aguiar; S5, 2008: Clodoaldo Araujo; S6, 2009: Marina Erthal; S9, 2013: Renata Tolentino
Brazil	O Aprendiz	João Doria Jr.	Record TV	Você está demitido!	S7, 2010: Samara Schuch; S8, 2011: Janaina Melo
Brazil	Aprendiz Celebridades	Roberto Justus	Record TV	Você está demitido!	S10, 2014: Ana Moser
Brazil	O Aprendiz	Roberto Justus	Band	Você está demitido!	S11, 2019: Gabriel Gasparini
Bulgaria	Звездни стажанти Zvezdni stajanti	Stefan Sharlopov	Nova TV	Ти си уволнен! Ti si uvolnen!	S1, 2016: 100 Kila
Colombia	El Aprendiz	Jean-Claude Bessudo	Canal Caracol	¡Estás despedido!	S1, 2006: Kees Stapel
Czech Republic and Slovakia	Šéfka	Nora Mojsejová	TV Prima; TV JOJ	U mňa si dnes skončil!	S1, 2011: Michal Pilip
Denmark	Hyret Eller Fyret	Klaus Riskaer Pedersen	Kanal 5	Du er fyret	S1, 2005: Louise Holm
Estonia	Mantlipärija	Armin Karu	TV3		S1, 2007: Sverre Puustusmaa
Finland	Diili	Jari Sarasvuo	MTV3	Olet vapautettu	S1, 2005: Olli Rikala
Finland	Diili	Hjallis Harkimo	MTV3	Sä saat potkut!	S2, 2009: Antti Seppinen; S3, 2010: Mira Kasslin; S4, 2011: Jarno Purtsi; S5, 2013: Maria Drockila; S6, 2018: Olli-Pekka Villa
France	The Apprentice : Qui décrochera le job ?	Bruno Bonnell	M6	Vous n'êtes pas prêt !	S1, 2015: Séverine Verdot
Germany	Big Boss	Reiner Calmund	RTL	Sie haben frei	S1, 2004: Carmen Dohmen
Georgia	კანდიდატი Kandidati	Lado Gurgenidze	Rustavi 2		S1, 2004: Luka Lomaia
Georgia	შეგირდი Shegidi	Kakha Bendukidze	Imedi		S1, 2011: ?
Greece	Ο Υποψήφιος	Petros Kostopoulos	Alpha TV		S1, 2004: Thanos Marinis
Hungary	Az álommeló	Levente Balogh	RTL		S1, 2023: Balázs Keserű; S2, 2024: Eszter Kása
Indonesia	The Apprentice Indonesia	Peter F. Gontha	Indosiar (2005)	Anda saya pecat	S1, 2005: Fendi Gunawan Liem; S2, 2009: Charles Minin; S3, 2010: Nurudin Bin Syarif; S4, 2011: Oki Musakti
Indonesia	The Apprentice Indonesia	TBA	RCTI	Anda saya pecat	S1, 2005: Fendi Gunawan Liem; S2, 2009: Charles Minin; S3, 2010: Nurudin Bin Syarif; S4, 2011: Oki Musakti
Ireland	The Apprentice	Bill Cullen	TV3	You are fired!	S1, 2008: Brenda Shanahan; S2, 2009: Steve Rayner; S3, 2010: Michelle Massey; S4, 2011: Eugene Heary
Ireland	Celebrity Apprentice Ireland	Caroline Downey	TV3	You are fired!	S1, 2013: Edele Lynch
Italy	The Apprentice	Flavio Briatore	Cielo; Sky Uno	Sei fuori!	S1, 2012: Francesco Menegazzo; S2, 2014: Alice Maffezzoli
Mongolia	Аппрентис Монгол; Apprentice Mongolia	Ganhuyag Chuluun Hutagt	Mongol TV		S1, 2020: Ts. Barkhas
The Netherlands	De Nieuwe Moszkowicz	Bram Moszkowicz	AVRO		S1, 2005: Nienke Hoogervorst
The Netherlands	Topmanager Gezocht	Bram Moszkowicz	BNN	Met jou ga ik niet ondernemen!	S1, 2011: Rogier Berlips
The Netherlands	Celebrity Apprentice	Michel Perridon	Videoland		S1, 2022: Bizzey
New Zealand	The Apprentice New Zealand	Terry Serepisos	TV2		S1, 2010: Thomas Ben
New Zealand	The Apprentice Aotearoa	Mike Pero	TVNZ 1	You're fired!	S1, 2021: Vanessa Goodson
Norway	Kandidaten	Inger Ellen Nicolaisen	TVNORGE	Du har sparken	S1, 2005: Jeanette Bretteville
Portugal	Temos Negócio	Leonor Poeiras	TVI		S1, 2015–16: Luís & Rodrigo
Russia	Кандидат; Kandidat	Arkady Novikov	TNT	Вы уволены	S1, 2005: Tatyana Burdelova
Russia	Кандидат; Kandidat	Vladimir Potanin	TNT	Вы уволены	S2, 2006: ??; S3, 2007: ??
South Africa	The Apprentice: SA	Tokyo Sexwale	SABC3	You're dismissed!	S1, 2009: Zanele Batyashe & Khomotso Choma
South Africa	The Apprentice: SA	Magda Wierzycka			
Spain	El Aprendiz	Lluís Bassat	LaSexta	Estás despedido	S1, 2009: Juan Ignacio Lanchares
Sweden	The Apprentice Sverige	Gunilla von Platen	TV4		S1, 2022: Tom Flumés
Switzerland	Traum Job	Jürg Marquar	SF1	Sie sind raus	S1, 2005: Martin Bachofner
Turkey	Çırak	Tuncay Özilhan	Kanal D	Seninle çalışmak istemiyorum!	S1, 2005: Ahmet Isik
United Kingdom	The Apprentice	Alan Sugar	BBC Two (2005–06); BBC One (2007–present)	You're fired!	S1, 2005: Tim Campbell; S2, 2006: Michelle Dewberry; S3, 2007: Simon Ambrose; S4, 2008: Lee McQueen; S5, 2009: Yasmina Siadatan; Junior Apprentice, 2010: Arjun Rajyagor; S6, 2010: Stella English; S7, 2011: Tom Pellereau; Young Apprentice, 2011: Zara Brownless; S8, 2012: Ricky Martin; Young Apprentice, 2012: Ashleigh Porter-Exley; S9, 2013: Dr. Leah Totton; S10, 2014: Mark Wright; S11, 2015: Joseph Valente; S12, 2016: Alana Spencer; S13, 2017: Sarah Lynn and James White; S14, 2018: Sian Gabbidon; S15, 2019: Carina Lepore; S16, 2022: Harpreet Kaur; S17, 2023: Marnie Swindells; S18, 2024: Rachel Woolford; S19, 2025: Dean Franklin; S20, 2026: Karishma Vijay
United States	The Apprentice	Donald Trump	NBC	You're fired!	S1, 2004: Bill Rancic; S2, 2004: Kelly Perdew; S3, 2005: Kendra Todd; S4, 2005: Randal Pinkett; S5, 2006: Sean Yazbeck; S6, 2007: Stefanie Schaeffer; S10, 2010: Brandy Kuentzel
United States	The Apprentice: Martha Stewart	Martha Stewart	NBC	You just don't fit in!	S1, 2005: Dawna Stone
United States	The Celebrity Apprentice	Donald Trump	NBC	You're fired!	S7, 2008: Piers Morgan; S8, 2009: Joan Rivers; S9, 2010: Bret Michaels; S11, 2011: John Rich; S12, 2012: Arsenio Hall; S13, 2013: Trace Adkins; S14, 2015: Leeza Gibbons
United States	The New Celebrity Apprentice	Arnold Schwarzenegger	NBC	You're terminated!	S15, 2017: Matt Iseman
Vietnam	Ước mơ của tôi	Phạm Thu Nga	VTV3		S1, 2007: ?

=== Africa ===
==== Pan-African ====
An African version, The Apprentice Africa, is hosted by advertising magnate and co-founder of Insight Communications, Biodun Shobanjo. The Apprentice Africa is based in Lagos, Nigeria. It is aired in Nigeria on (Nigerian Television Authority), Silverbird TV, Super Screen, and MBI Television; Ghana on (TV3); Kenya on (KTN); Uganda on (WBS); and Tanzania (TBC1). It premiered in February 2008. Eighteen contestants on the show come from Nigeria, Kenya, Uganda, Ghana, Cameroon, and Republic of Guinea. Owner Patrick E. Isibor and Jajaebu Kamarou.

The maiden edition of The Apprentice Africa was won by Isaac Dankyi-Koranteng, a 31-year-old Sales Manager from Ghana. Isaac beat Eunice Omole, a Nigerian American in a final show that saw most of the evicted contestants supporting the winner. Isaac was hired for Bank PHB Plc and will be assigned special responsibilities, by the Managing Director and CEO of the bank, which include research and development of products, and roll-out strategy for the bank in new markets, with supervision by the Apprentice Africa "CEO", Mr. Biodun Shobanjo.

==== South Africa ====
The South African version that aired on SABC3 is hosted by Tokyo Sexwale, a mining magnate. During the live finale 22 September, Sexwale hired the final two—Zanele Batyashe, 24, and Khomotso Choma, 34, which not only elicited anger from viewers, but also resulted in complaints across the country after the announcement was made. Later, US Series 4 winner Randal Pinkett recommended Trump not do so in the finale (See US Series 4) after he pondered hiring the runner-up, something which may have been inspired by this incident. The catch phrase Tokyo Sexwale used was "You're dismissed!"

=== Asia ===
==== Pan-Asian ====
The Asian version of The Apprentice was aired on AXN Asia. Tony Fernandes, the entrepreneur behind the successful AirAsia airline carrier, was the host for this version. It was revived in 2021 as The Apprentice: ONE Championship Edition, with Chatri Sityodtong, CEO of ONE Championship as the new host of the series.

==== Indonesia ====
Media mogul Peter F. Gontha is the host. The show, the first Apprentice spin-off in Asia, started on 3 October 2005, and aired every Monday on 21.30 Western Indonesian Time (GMT +7) on the television station Indosiar. According to the show's official website, the apprentice winner, a 29-year-old male whose name is Fendi Gunawan Liem, will be earning a salary of 600 million rupiahs, equivalent to about US$66,000.

==== Malaysia ====
The Apprentice's Malaysian version spin-off in Asia started on October 3, 2005, and aired every Monday on 22.30 Malaysia time (GMT+8) on the television station TV3. The catchphrase is "Awak dipecat", or "you are fired".

=== Cross-continent ===
==== Pan-Arab ====
Real estate tycoon Mohamed Ali Alabbar hosts the Arabic version from Dubai called الإدارة جدارة (Al idara jadara). The show has not started yet on LBC Lebanon.

==== Russia ====
In Russia the show is called Candidate (Russian: Кандидат) and is broadcast on the TNT channel. The first season in 2005 was hosted by restaurant tycoon Arkady Novikov, and the winner, Tatyana Burdelova, was hired as the CEO for one of Novikov's companies. The second season in late summer of 2006 was hosted by the mining, metals, banking and property tycoon Vladimir Potanin. As of January 2007, Potanin's personal wealth is estimated to be $14.2 billion (roughly 369 billion rubles) , which makes him the richest host of any version of the show so far. The catchphrase is Вы уволены, or "You are fired".

Candidate failed to attract a Russian audience. British TV producer Peter Pomerantsev credited Russian culture with its failure, writing, "The usual way to get a job in Russia is not by impressing at an interview, but by what is known as blat – 'connections'. Russian society isn't much interested in the hard-working, brilliant young business mind."

==== Turkey ====
Turkey's version is hosted by one of that country's most successful businessmen, Tuncay Özilhan the CEO of Anadolu Group. The show is titled Çırak (The Apprentice), and the catchphrase is "Seninle çalışmak istemiyorum!" ("I do not want to work with you"). Ahmet Isik was the winner of the first season.

=== Europe ===
==== Belgium ====
In Belgium, VT4 broadcast De Topmanager on 1 March 2006. Rob Heyvaert from Capco hired Claudia Schiepers from 16 candidates. Claudia Schiepers worked for Capco for almost 4 years, in both the UK and New York. Taping of the show happened in 2005 from May through July, mostly in the city of Antwerp.

==== Denmark ====
Hosted by Klaus Riskaer Pedersen in the Danish version. Pedersen's catchphrase is "Du er fyret" ("you're fired"). Louise Holm was hired at the end of the first season.

==== Estonia ====
The Estonian version called Mantlipärija was hosted by Armin Karu, the owner of the Olympic Entertainment Group (casinos and hotel chains). It was shown on TV3 at the fall of 2007.

==== Finland ====
Former talk show host and current consulting firm owner Jari Sarasvuo hosted the Finnish version on MTV3, called Diili (slang term for "deal"). Olli Rikala was the winner of the first season, although his competitor in the final was also hired, as well three of the other competitors. The show was aired in spring 2005.

The second season was shown in Autumn 2009. It was hosted by well-known business entrepreneur and TV personality Harry Harkimo, whose catchphrase was "Mä annan sulle potkut!" or "Sä saat potkut!" ("You are fired"). The winner of the second season was Antti Seppinen. He was hired as the marketing manager of urban area project in Sipoo (Sipoonranta). The third season was shown in Autumn 2010 and Harry Harkimo continued as a host. The winner of the third season was former Olympic track cycler Mira Kasslin. She was hired as the manager of hotel project in Hanko.

==== France ====
Titled The Apprentice : Qui décrochera le job ? ("The Apprentice: Who will get the job?"), the French version debuted on 9 September 2015 on M6. Entrepreneur and politician Bruno Bonnell is the host. On 17 September 2015, the channel announced the deprogramming of the show after only two episodes aired, due to a lack of viewers. The entire season was, however, made available online.

==== Germany ====
In September 2004, German TV station ProSieben aired an adaptation of The Apprentice called Hire or Fire, produced by and starring John de Mol. The show was cancelled after the first episode due to low ratings.

From October 2004 to January 2005, German TV station RTL aired an adaptation of The Apprentice called Big Boss. The show was hosted by former soccer manager Reiner Calmund, and the winner received a prize of €250,000 ($300,000 at the time) for starting her or his own business. One candidate was eliminated at the end of each episode with the phrase "Sie haben frei" (you are excused). The show scored fair to poor ratings and was not renewed for another season.

==== Ireland ====
An Irish version began in September 2008 on Irish broadcaster TV3. It is hosted by business mogul Bill Cullen, who has made his fortune from the motor industry, and is the owner of Renault Ireland; his company makes over €350 million annually. At the time of the announcement that Cullen would front the show, many were skeptical, saying that Cullen would not be scary or tough enough on the contestants, but many have praised his handling of the show since then. The show is based in Dublin, and the winner receives a 12-month contract working alongside Cullen with a package worth €100,000. Although TV3 have made home-produced versions of international programmes before such as The Weakest Link, The Apprentice is without doubt proving to be the most successful for the broadcaster, attracting large viewing figures, and receiving much attention from the media in Ireland. The show's catchphrase is You are fired!

The show's first scandal involved Joanna Murphy, one of the contestants. She had been in contact with her family between takes, even though it is forbidden according to the rules of the show. She used the project manager laptop to communicate with her husband, and received his help in the hope of winning a task. Her team had to collect electrical equipment, and this would be recycled. The team with the most equipment won the task. It was exposed that Joanna's family and friends were actually raiding a recycling centre near Naas Racecourse, and bringing it to her teams 'special recycling centre' down the road. Each vehicle was driven by her friends and family, but viewers and cameramen were unaware of this. Some vehicles even came in more than once, but changed number registration plates, so as not to be caught by the cameras. This stunt was exposed while in the boardroom; Cullen fired her as a result. The story was in nearly all of the national newspapers in Ireland, and was the first major scandal to hit the show. RTÉ, TV3's biggest rivals, have considered the show's success, and produced their own version of Dragons' Den as a result, in the hope of also attracting Irish viewers. The Irish Apprentice ended on December 8, 2008, with Brenda Shanahan winning in the end, after collecting the most money for her charity, and winning 10 out of 11 tasks in the series. Brenda then started working for Bill, as his apprentice.

The success of the first series has led to a second series being produced, which aired on TV3 in 2009. The winner of the 2009 series was Steve Rayner. He won the show despite admitting on the show that he is a recovering alcoholic and gambler.

==== Italy ====
In 2012 and 2013, Sky Italia aired first on Cielo and then on Sky Uno, two seasons of The Apprentice, with Flavio Briatore as main host.

==== The Netherlands ====
In 2005, high-profile lawyer Bram Moszkowicz offered a highly paid position ("the new Moszkowicz") in his law firm in AVRO's show De Nieuwe Moszkowicz. The show focused much on the character of Moszkowicz, a flamboyant man known for defending a number of very unpopular figures, most notably Desi Bouterse. Eventually Nienke Hoogervorst won out.

In 2011, a new Dutch adaptation of The Apprentice aired, called Topmanager Gezocht, closely following the BBC format. This time, the series centered around Dutch entrepreneur Aad Ouborg, known mostly for creating and managing the Princess Household Appliances brand. The phrase used by Ouborg to fire contestants is Met jou ga ik niet ondernemen!, which translates as "I'm not going into business with you". Key scenes were filmed in Rotterdam, although the Boardroom scenes take place in a theatre in the city of Breda, which is the city where Ouborg's HQ.

In 2022, a celebrity version aired on the streaming service Videoland. The show was hosted by millionaire Michel Perridon, who also appeared on the Dutch version of Dragon's Den.

==== Norway ====
Produced for network TVNORGE, this was notable for being the first Apprentice spinoff in Europe. It is also notable for having the first female host—hairdressing mogul Inger Ellen Nicolaisen hosted the first season of the Norwegian version. The show is titled Kandidaten (The Candidate), and the catchphrase is "Du har sparken" ("you're fired").

==== Spain ====
The Spanish version of the show, called El Aprendiz, premiered in September 2009 on La Sexta. It was hosted by advertising mogul Lluís Bassat.

==== Switzerland ====
Swiss publishing mogul Jürg Marquard hosts the show, which first aired in April 2005 on SF1. The show is titled Traum Job (Dream Job), and the catchphrase is "Sie sind raus" ("You are out"). Martin was ultimately hired at the end of the first season.

==== United Kingdom ====
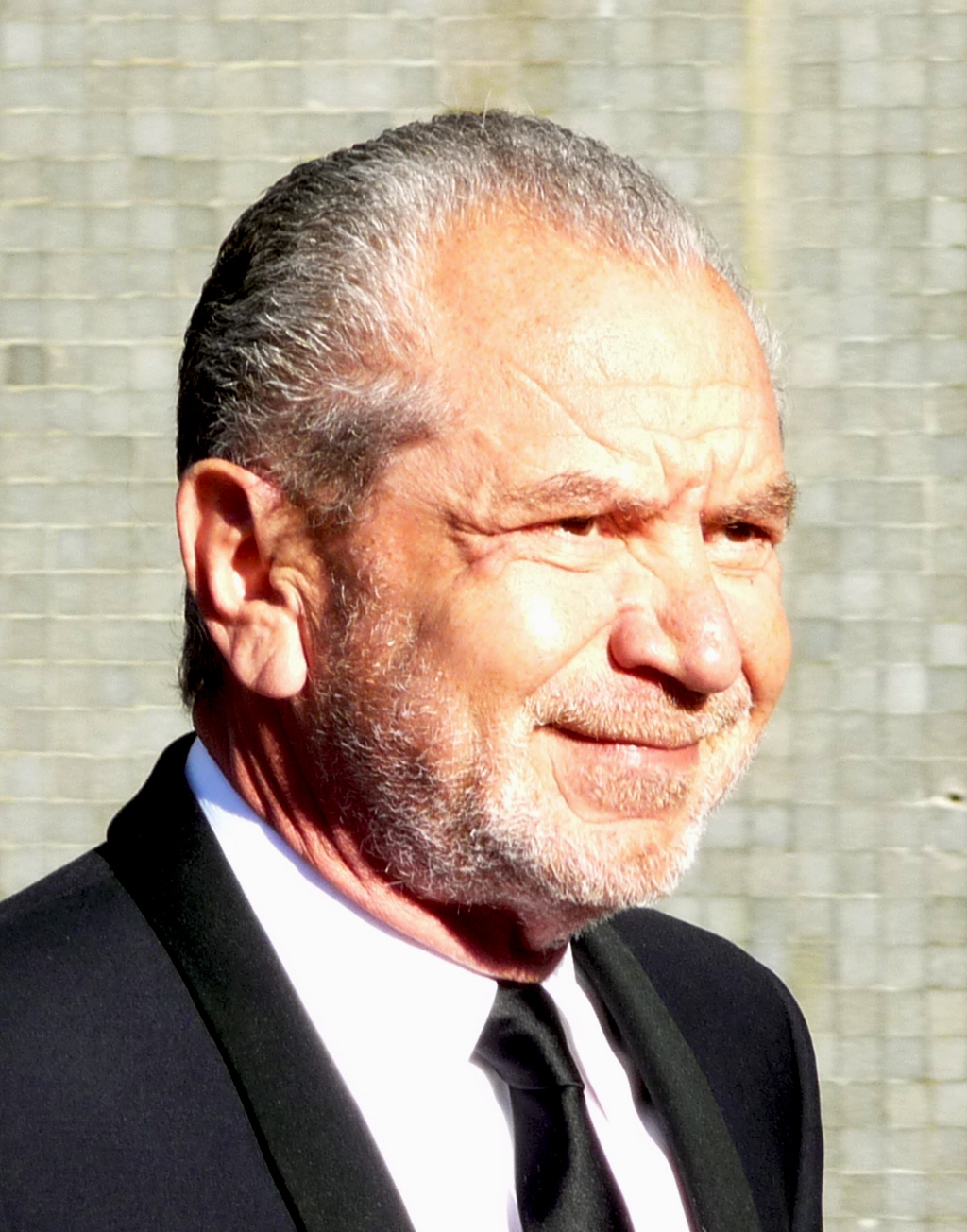
Alan Sugar in 2009

Alan Sugar, founder of electronics company Amstrad, is the boss on The Apprentice in the United Kingdom. He ranks 84th on The Sunday Times Rich List 2007 with an estimated worth of around £973m. His catchphrase is "You're fired". Like the US version, the show also has a narrator, Mark Halliley. It has a very different visual and musical style to the US series, and in keeping with BBC guidelines, features no product placement. In later series, Lord Sugar offers the winner an investment, rather than direct employment.

The show started on 16 February 2005 on BBC Two, with the final episode of the first series shown on 4 May 2005. Tim Campbell, a former transport manager for the London Underground, was ultimately hired and as a result, landed a position at Amstrad with an introductory contract of 1 year with a salary exceeding £100,000. Saira Khan was fired on the series finale but has used the show to help launch a media career, including a regular column on the BBC Apprentice website and presenter of the enterprise show Beat the Boss on CBBC. James Max, a semi-finalist of the show, presents the daily Business Update on Talksport alongside Ian Wright and Adrian Durham he also covers for non-sports presenters on a regular basis. He presents two weekly shows on LBC 97.3 Radio on Saturday and Sunday evenings.

A second series of The Apprentice UK began on Wednesday 22 February 2006, with the winner being Michelle Dewberry, chosen over Ruth Badger.

Series three of The Apprentice UK began on Wednesday 28 March 2007, 'promoted' to the more mainstream BBC One channel because of the series' increasing popularity. The winner was Simon Ambrose who was chosen over Kristina Grimes.

Series four of The Apprentice UK began on Wednesday 26 March 2008 on BBC One and ran for twelve weekly episodes. A record 20,000 applications were received. The winner of the 2008 series was Lee McQueen, having beaten Claire Young, Helene Speight and Alex Wotherspoon in the final, which featured four candidates instead of the usual two. The series peaked at 9.7 million viewers during the last episode, an unprecedented figure for the series.

A spin-off show, The Apprentice: You're Fired!, is shown on BBC Two straight after the BBC One broadcast. The 30-minute programme has a studio audience and interview with the fired apprentice, and Lord Sugar usually appears in the final episode of each series.

The RTL Group holds international licence rights for the show worldwide, and the show is produced by RTL's Talkback Thames. The British opening theme is "Dance of the Knights" from Prokofiev's Romeo and Juliet, with the boardroom music provided by UK artist Dru Masters.

The BBC has also screened series 1–5 of the American version (as of winter 2010), being broadcast some considerable time after the original US airing, and in the graveyard slot (11:00 pm onwards).

The television show inspired recreation of the show in form of competitions amongst student enterprise community and in 2013 has launched as a joint event called National Student Apprentice. A number of university societies organised local 'Apprentice Competitions'.

In 2011, the 7th series was broadcast, with one major difference: the candidates would be competing for a £250,000 investment into their business for a 50% equity stake from Lord Sugar. In previous years, the prize was a six-figure job at one of Lord Sugar's companies. It is widely viewed as the reason that the show has continued to air whilst all other international versions have fallen away.

=== Oceania ===
==== Australia ====
The Australian version of The Apprentice began airing on 28 September 2009 on the Nine Network. The host is Mark Bouris, the founder and chairman of Wizard Home Loans. The series is produced by the production company FremantleMedia. Sales consultant Andrew Morello won the series and was employed as a sales director to Bouris. Morello is currently head of business development at Bouris' wealth management company, Yellow Brick Road.

The Celebrity Apprentice Australia began screening on the Nine Network in October 2011, with comedian Julia Morris winning the first season. Two more seasons followed. The show did not air in 2014, but returned in 2015 for a fourth season, with singer and model Sophie Monk winning.

==== New Zealand ====
The Apprentice New Zealand, initially aired in 2010, was hosted by Terry Serepisos. The show had 14 contestants each vying for the prize of getting a six-figure salary at one of Serepisos' companies. The show began screening on 16 February 2010 on TV2.

The series relaunched in 2021 under the title The Apprentice Aotearoa, hosted by Mike Pero. The relaunched series began screening on 10 May 2021 on TVNZ 1.

=== South America ===
==== Brazil ====
O Aprendiz, a Brazilian version of The Apprentice hosted by marketing businessman Roberto Justus, premiered on 4 November 2004. People+Arts (a cable channel that broadcasts The Apprentice in Latin America) and Rede Record (a Brazilian broadcasting network) teamed up with Fremantle Media to create the show. Justus' catchphrase is "Você está demitido" ("you're fired"). For 2009 and 2010, the show had businessman João Doria Jr. as the host.

Justus returned in 2013 to host the ninth season with a cast of candidates from previous seasons. In late 2013, Rede Record confirmed the first season of Aprendiz Celebridades, a Brazilian version of Celebrity Apprentice, which premiered in April 2014. The show was broadcast on Tuesdays and Thursdays with a total of 22 episodes. Fifteen Brazilian celebrities battled for a prize of R$1,000,000.00.

After almost five years, the reality show returned again, featuring 18 digital influencers competing for a R$1,000,000.00 cash prize. It was broadcast by Band and Canal Sony.

==== Colombia ====
The Colombian version is called El Aprendiz (literal translation from the original show's name). It was hosted by Jean-Claude Bessudo, a French-born tourism entrepreneur. The show first aired in May 2005 on Canal Caracol. The show's catchphrase is "Estás despedido!" (You're fired!).

== Similar programs ==
- The Apprentice: Martha Stewart, a spin-off with Martha Stewart
- The Cut, with Tommy Hilfiger
- Project Runway, with Heidi Klum
- The Assistant, with Andy Dick, an MTV-produced parody.
- The Benefactor, with Mark Cuban of the NBA Dallas Mavericks
- Fire Me...Please/The Sack Race, where contestants try to get fired from their job
- The Law Firm with Roy Black
- My Big Fat Obnoxious Boss, a parody and hoax
- The Rebel Billionaire: Branson's Quest for the Best, with Richard Branson of the Virgin Group
- Ultimate Hustler, with Damon Dash
- I Want to Work for Diddy, with "P. Diddy" Sean Combs
- Tycoon, with Peter Jones
- Dragons' Den
- The Next Internet Millionaire, by Internet entrepreneur Joel Comm
- 50 Cent: The Money and the Power, by 50 Cent
- The Grand Hustle, by T.I.
- The Apprentice: ONE Championship Edition, with Chatri Sityodtong
