= Twitter Power =

2009 book by Joel Comm

Twitter Power: How to Dominate Your Market One Tweet at a Time
- Cover
- Author: Joel Comm
- Language: English
- Subject: Internet Marketing, Business
- Genre: Non-fiction,
- Publisher: John Wiley & Sons
- Publication date: February 2009
- Publication place: United States
- Pages: 248 pp
- ISBN: 978-0-470-45842-6
- OCLC: 262426853
- Dewey Decimal: 658.8/72 22
- LC Class: HF5415.1265 .C646 2009

Twitter Power: How to Dominate Your Market One Tweet at a Time is a book about Twitter by Joel Comm published in 2009. It introduces readers to Twitter, explaining how to create a Twitter account, market their brands, and gain Twitter followers.

Published by John Wiley & Sons, the book generally received positive reviews. It was criticized by a CNET reviewer for giving readers "a phony formula where you just paint by the numbers" to attempt to ensnare Twitter followers as customers.

== Synopsis ==
The book aims to teach business owners how to use microblogging service Twitter to network and build a community around their services, and to use tweets for viral marketing. Comm describes and provides examples of five tweet groups: "classic, mission-accomplished, question, entertainment and picture tweets".

In Twitter Power' resources section, Comm includes a list of "Power Twitterers". He also lists Twitters tools like TweetDeck, a dashboard, and Twellow, a user directory. Tony Robbins wrote the book's preface.

== Reception ==
The News-Gazette's Margo L. Dill said the book is best suited for Internet marketers who want people to view a website or to sell merchandise. She said that reading articles about Twitter instead of the book would be preferable for people using Twitter for personal use like keeping up to date with celebrities. Dill praised the book for being an "easy read for a book about technology and social marketing".

In CNET article titled "Twitter power? For real?", journalist Charles Cooper criticized the book for providing a "phony formula where you just paint by the numbers". He said the book is "devoted to doling out tips on how to game the system to reel in 'loyal customers and more sales overall'". Cooper found Twitter Power contradictory because it says that Twitter is "not a place where people come to sell—and pushing sales hard on Twitter just isn't going to work", but almost immediately after says that following people on Twitter could get them to become customers.

Mike Werling of Entrepreneur described Twitter Power as "Joel Comm's ode to the haiku of blogging". Linda L. Richards wrote in January Magazine that Twitter Power was a "blazingly lucid book" that is "well thought out, friendly and entirely easy to follow". Mint columnist Sidin Vadukut extolled the book for being "free of jargon and effective" and that Comm "writes with a jocular simplicity that makes you want to play along".
