= Koranteng =

Koranteng is a surname. Notable people with the surname include:

- Eugene Koranteng (born 1966), Ghanaian triple jumper
- Fredua Koranteng Adu (born 1989), Ghananian-American athlete
- Isaac Dankyi-Koranteng (born 1977), Ghanaian businessman
- Nathan Koranteng (born 1992), English footballer
- Prince Koranteng Amoako (born 1973), Ghanaian footballer
- Samuel Koranteng-Pipim (born 1957), Ghanaian writer and theologian
- Seth Koranteng, Ghanaian diplomat
