= The Apprentice Africa =

Former reality TV show

The Apprentice Africa is an African version of the original American Reality TV format, The Apprentice, hosted by Donald Trump. The show was hosted by Mr. Biodun Shobanjo, an advertising magnate, co-founder of Insight Communications and CEO of Troyka Group. It gathered 18 contestants from across six African countries: Nigeria, Ghana, Uganda, Kenya, Cameroon and Guinea. The show was aired in Nigeria on (Nigerian Television Authority), Silverbird TV, Super Screen, and MBI Television; Ghana on (TV3); Kenya on (KTN); Uganda on (WBS); and Tanzania (TBC1); premiered in February 2008 and ended in June 2008.

The premier edition, shot in the Nigerian commercial capital Lagos, had eighteen episodes where contestants competed in seventeen business tasks requiring street smarts and corporate intelligence to conquer. Contestants were arranged into two groups and in each episode, the winning team was rewarded while the losing team meet the CEO and his associates in the boardroom to explain why they lost. The Project Manager for that task would choose two teammates perceived to be the reason for the lost or the weakest link in the team, one of whom would then be fired.

Isaac Dankyi-Koranteng, a 31-year-old Sales and Marketing Manager from Ghana, won the first season. He was hired by Biodun Shobanjo. As a reward, the winner was offered a brand new car and an annual salary of $200,000.

The show was sponsored by Bank PHB and the bank's communications officials, Charles Odibo and Aziza Uko, served as executive producers of the television show.

== Contestants ==
- Omar Bah
- Regina Agyare
- Akatu Ochai
- Anthony Migui
- Nancy Kalembe
- Michelle Ikenador
- Lilian Esoro
- Eddie Mbugua
- Hannah Acquah
- Oscar Kamukama
- Kathleen Ndongmo
- Issac Dankyi-Koranteng
- Bekeme Masade
- Babatunde Ojikutu
- Blessing Njoku
- Deox Tibeingana
- Joyce Mbaya
- Nnamdi Mbonu
- Eunice Omole
