= Isaac Dankyi-Koranteng =

Ghanaian businessman (born 1977)

- Born: 1977 (age 48–49); Kumasi, Ghana
- Spouse: Nancy Dankyi-Koranteng
- Children: 5
- Website: isaacdk.com

Isaac Dankyi-Koranteng Isaac Dankyi-Koranteng (born 1977 in Kumasi, Ghana) is the first African to be hired on the African version of The Apprentice, a television reality show hosted by Biodun Shobanjo called The Apprentice Africa. Dankyi-Koranteng was hired on television during the premier season finale of The Apprentice Africa in Nigeria on (Nigerian Television Authority), Silverbird TV, Super Screen, and MBI Television; Ghana on (TV3); Kenya on (KTN); Uganda on (WBS); and Tanzania (TBC1). Until he was hired, Dankyi-Koranteng was the Customer Account Manager for Chinese Telecom giants Huawei Technologies Co. Ltd. in Ghana. During the season, Dankyi-Koranteng was Project Manager on four occasions winning three. He was never taken to the boardroom by any other Project Manager as the weakest link throughout the season.

== Education ==
He attended University Primary School in Kumasi and continued at Salvation Army Primary School in Accra.

Isaac Dankyi-Koranteng started his secondary education at Abetifi Presby Secondary School in the Eastern Region (Ghana), and continued at Twene Amanfo Secondary School, in the Brong-Ahafo Region (Ghana) where he obtained his GCE 'O' Level Certificate in 1994. In 1996, Dankyi-Koranteng obtain GCE 'A' Level Certificate with A,A,B,B from Technology Secondary School in Kumasi.

Dankyi-Koranteng graduated from the Kwame Nkrumah University of Science and Technology (KNUST) in 2001 with a Bachelor of Arts in Publishing Studies degree. In the university, Dankyi-Koranteng established himself as a capable leader when he was elected the Secretary of Unity Hall of residence in 1999. He was subsequently elected the President of the Hall in 2000 and also represented students on the University Residence Committee.

In 2001, Isaac was elected the Co-ordinating Secretary of the National Union of Ghana Students (NUGS).

Dankyi-Koranteng holds an MBA (General) from Wuhan University of Technology, 2005. In China, Dankyi-Koranteng was elected the President of the National Union of Ghana Students in China (NUGS-China)

== The Apprentice Africa ==
There were 18 contestants in all, including Deox Tibeingana, Hannah Acquah,Bekeme Masade, Anthony Njagi, Regina Agyare, Blessing Njoku, Oscar Kamukama, Michelle, Nancy Kalembe, Akatu Ochai, Eunice Omole, Joyce Mbaya, Nnamdi Mbonu, Eddie Mbugue, Kathleen Ndongmo and Omar Bah. Isaac was faced in the final with Eunice Omole, a 28-year-old Nigerian born in the United States.

For the final task, Dankyi-Koranteng organized a walk through event for Bank PHB. He exhibited the strong financial growth of the bank to its customers as well as gave them a first hand experience of the banks CSR activities by showcasing a model house constructed by a brilliant but needy student on Bank PHB's scholarship scheme. The student was present to interact with customers of the bank. He also organized an interactive banking experience of the banks wide range of electronic and internet based products. His event ended with performances by Nigerian top comedian, Gbenga Adeyinka and Timi Dakolo of Idols West Africa fame. Though he was commended for putting up a good event, Biodun Shobanjo criticized him for allowing the comedian to handle the event as the master of ceremony.

During the finale, Dankyi-Koranteng realising from the interview stage of the competition that his only weakness was being 'laid' back, did a damage control by debunking that perception by describing himself as tactfully aggressive. He enjoyed enormous support from most of the evicted contestant. The finale was dramatic as Omole accused Dankyi-Koranteng of having excelled as Project Management on the hard work of her and other contestants. Dankyi-Koranteng also accused Omole of having no integrity for condoning foul play during the show. However, it was the CEO's final call as he said he wanted an apprentice who possessed a combination of intelligence, street smartness, character, and integrity.

== Personal life ==
Dankyi-Koranteng is married to Nancy and has five children, Darrel, Aimee, Jedidah, Hillary and Isaac. The Dankyi-Koranteng reside in Tema, Accra. Before the Apprentice Africa show, Isaac worked with Huawei Technologies Ltd for 3 years. He later worked with Bank PHB in Lagos, Nigeria, from 2008 to 2009 as a member of The Corporate Execution Team. He returned to Ghana and joined Airtel Ghana as the Corporate Sales Manager from 2009 to 2012 June and he joined IBM as Territory Sales Manager for Ghana. From January 2014 Isaac was appointed the managing director of Resourcery Ghana Limited, an IT integration giant in West Africa.
