= Insightful Player =

2011 book by Chrissy Carew

Insightful Player the title of a 2011 book by Chrissy Carew and a New Hampshire-based organization formed in 2007 by the same person to promote the charitable works and inspirational stories of a number of current and former NFL players. Players share their stories on the Insightful Player website and make media appearances under the Insightful Player banner. The campaign has been featured in the Boston Globe, in Patriots Weekly Magazine and a number of other publications.

== Clients ==
The current “roster” of NFL players that participate in the Insightful Player program include Roger Staubach, Andre Tippett, Devin McCourty, Jason McCourty, Antonio Garay, Jarvis Green, Usama Young, Jerricho Cotchery, Danny Clark, Steve Grogan, Rashied Davis, Reggie Kelly, Kyle Arrington and Montell Owens.

== Book ==
The stories of these players were compiled into a book authored by Carew entitled Insightful Player. The book is published by Morgan James Publishing and was released in September 2011.
