= The Apprentice Aotearoa =

New Zealand reality television series

- Genre: Reality
- Starring: Mike Pero; Cassie Roma; Justin Tomlinson
- Narrated by: Kara Rickard
- Country of origin: New Zealand
- Original language: English
- No. of series: 1
- No. of episodes: 12

Production
- Producer: Great Southern Television
- Running time: 60 minutes (including advertisements)

Original release
- Network: TVNZ 1
- Release: 10 May – 20 July 2021

Related
- The Apprentice; The Apprentice New Zealand

The Apprentice Aotearoa is a New Zealand reality television series currently airing on TVNZ 1 started on 10 May 2021. It featured Mike Pero as the CEO. The winner received NZ$50,000 and one-on-one mentoring with Pero. The advisors are Cassie Roma and Justin Tomlinson.

The series initially aired in 2010 under the title The Apprentice New Zealand.

== Candidates ==
Candidate	Background	Age	Hometown	Result
Vanessa Goodson	Event Agency Owner and Creative Director	30	Auckland	Winner
Stephen McDowell	Social media content creator and advisor	28	Invercargill	Runner-up
Michael Wilson	Auctioneer	33	Auckland	Fired in Week 11
Erna Basson	Beauty Brand Founder - Erabella Beauty	33	Auckland	Fired in Week 10
Kennedy Anderson	Social media agency Founder and Creative Director	23	Auckland	Fired in Week 9
Gabriel El-khishin	Mental Health Clinician	22	Auckland	Fired in Week 8
Tony Collins	Social media agency Managing Director	24	Auckland	Fired in Week 7
Megan Fernandes	Marketing Specialist and sneaker customiser	24	Auckland	Fired in Week 7
Olivia Rogers	Tourism agency GM and Marketing Specialist	31	Auckland	Fired in Week 6
Kyria Warren	Founder of luxury tourism business	43	Auckland	Fired in Week 5
Shardae Mitha	Personal Trainer, Boxing Coach and Event Planner	35	Auckland	Fired in Week 4
Nicola Spicer	Luxury swimwear founder	36	Auckland / Perth / Bali	Fired in Week 3
Bari Samadi	Beverage Company Managing Director	40	Auckland	Fired in Week 2
Ish Ryklief	Car Salesman	24	Sydney	Fired in Week 1

== Weekly results ==
Candidate	Original team	Week 3 team	Week 8 team	Week 10 team	Application Result	Record as Project Manager
Vanessa Goodson	Tahi	Mana	Mana	Mana	Winner	1-1 (Win in week 4, Loss in week 9)
Stephen McDowell	Mana	Tahi	Tahi	Mana	Runner-up	1-1 (Win in week 10, Loss in week 7)
Michael Wilson	Mana	Mana	Mana	Tahi	Fired in Week 11	2-2 (Win in weeks 7 & 8, Loss in weeks 1 & 10)
Erna Basson	Tahi	Tahi	Tahi	Tahi	Fired in Week 10	2-0 (Win in weeks 5 & 9)
Kennedy Anderson	Mana	Mana	Mana		Fired in Week 9	0-1 (Loss in week 3)
Gabriel El-khishin	Mana	Mana	Tahi		Fired in Week 8	1-1 (Win in week 6, Loss in week 8)
Tony Collins	Mana	Tahi			Fired in Week 7	1-0 (Win in week 3)
Megan Fernandes	Tahi	Tahi			Fired in Week 7	
Olivia Rogers	Tahi	Tahi			Fired in Week 6	0-1 (Loss in week 6)
Kyria Warren	Tahi	Mana			Fired in Week 5	1-1 (Win in week 1, Loss in week 5)
Shardae Mitha	Tahi	Tahi			Fired in Week 4	0-1 (Loss in week 4)
Nicola Spicer	Tahi	Mana			Fired in Week 3	1-0 (Win in week 2)
Bari Samadi	Mana				Fired in Week 2	0-1 (Loss in week 2)
Ish Ryklief	Mana				Fired in Week 1	

No.	Candidate	Elimination chart											
No.	Candidate	1	2	3	4	5	6	7	8	9	10	11	12
1	Vanessa Goodson	IN	IN	IN	WIN	IN	IN	IN	IN	LOSE	IN	IN	HIRED
2	Stephen McDowell	IN	BR	IN	BR	IN	IN	LOSE	IN	IN	WIN	IN	LOSE
3	Michael Wilson	LOSE	IN	IN	IN	BR	IN	WIN	WIN	IN	LOSE	FIRED	
4	Erna Basson	IN	IN	IN	BR	WIN	BR	IN	BR	WIN	FIRED		
5	Kennedy Anderson	IN	IN	LOSE	IN	IN	IN	IN	IN	FIRED			
6	Gabriel Elkhishin	IN	BR	IN	IN	BR	WIN	IN	FIRED				
7	Tony Collins	BR	IN	WIN	IN	IN	BR	FIRED					
8	Megan Fernandes	IN	IN	IN	IN	IN	IN	FIRED					
9	Olivia Rogers	IN	IN	IN	IN	IN	FIRED						
10	Kyria Warren	WIN	IN	BR	IN	FIRED							
11	Shardae Mitha	IN	IN	IN	FIRED								
12	Nicola Spicer	IN	WIN	FIRED									
13	Bari Samadi	IN	FIRED										
14	Ish Ryklief	FIRED											

The candidate was hired and won the competition.
The candidate was on the losing team.
The candidate won as project manager on his/her team.
The candidate lost as project manager on his/her team.
The candidate was brought to the final boardroom.
The candidate was fired.
The candidate lost as project manager and was fired.

== Challenges ==
=== Week 1 ===
- Air Date: 10 May 2021
- Project managers: Michael (Mana) and Kyria (Tahi)
- Task: To come up with a new popcorn flavour that would appeal to both kids and parents
- Result: Tahi received 25,000 orders. Mana received 11,500 orders.
- Winner: Tahi
- Reward: Sabrage Champagne Bar
- Brought into the boardroom: Michael, Tony, Ish
- Fired: Ish Ryklief
- Reasons for firing: Quiet throughout the task and in the boardroom and throwing himself under the bus.

=== Week 2 ===
- Air Date: 17 May 2021
- Project managers: Bari (Mana) and Nicola (Tahi)
- Task: To design and sell a new range of summer robes to two leading retailers.
- Result: Tahi received 1,300 orders with a profit of $156,000. Mana received 400 orders with a profit of $59,600.
- Winner: Tahi
- Reward: Beer tasting session and tour at Brothers' Brewery
- Brought into the boardroom: Bari, Gabriel, Stephen
- Fired: Bari Samadi
- Reasons for firing: Made costly decisions and didn't focus the team

=== Week 3 ===
- Air Date: 24 May 2021
- Team reshuffle: Stephen and Tony moved to Tahi, Kyria, Nicola and Vanessa moved to Mana.
- Project managers: Kennedy (Mana) and Tony (Tahi)
- Task: To create a social media campaign aiming to get Kiwis to Hamilton
- Result: Tahi fulfilled the brief better than Mana.
- Winner: Tahi
- Reward: MASU Restaurant SkyCity
- Brought into the boardroom: Kennedy, Kyria, Nicola
- Fired: Nicola Spicer
- Reasons for firing: Responsible for presentation team and failed to lead the team

=== Week 4 ===
- Air Date: 31 May 2021
- Project managers: Vanessa (Mana) and Shardae (Tahi)
- Task: To create and sell ice cream at an Auckland farmer's market.
- Result: Tahi made a profit of $342.47, while Mana made a profit of $509.03.
- Winner: Mana
- Reward: A 1920's high tea at Hotel DeBrett.
- Brought into the boardroom: Shardae, Erna, Stephen
- Fired: Shardae Mitha
- Reasons for firing: For not controlling the negativity within her team.

=== Week 5 ===
- Air Date: 7 Jun 2021
- Project managers: Kyria, initially Gabriel (Mana), and Erna (Tahi)
- Task: To create a new eco shampoo and conditioner product.
- Result: Tahi received 729 orders, Mana received 230 orders.
- Winner: Tahi
- Reward: Ten-pin bowling at Archie Brothers Cirque Electriq
- Brought into the boardroom: Kyria, Gabriel, Michael
- Fired: Kyria Warren
- Reasons for firing: For the pitch and bringing Michael to the boardroom instead of Kennedy.

=== Week 6 ===
- Air Date: 14 Jun 2021
- Project managers: Gabriel (Mana) and Olivia (Tahi)
- Task: Purchase a list of ten items at the lowest possible price.
- Result: Mana's total spend was $313, Tahi's total spend was $332.90.
- Winner: Mana
- Reward: A premium Go-karting experience at BlastaCars.
- Brought into the boardroom: Olivia, Erna, Tony
- Fired: Olivia Rogers
- Reasons for firing: For not bringing Megan to the final boardroom.

=== Week 7 ===
- Air Date: 21 Jun 2021
- Project managers: Michael (Mana) and Stephen (Tahi)
- Task: Negotiate with vendors to sell their products at the Go Green Expo.
- Result: Tahi's total commissions were $928, Mana's total commissions were $1,474.
- Winner: Mana
- Reward: Private session at Holey Moley.
- Brought into the Boardroom: Stephen, Megan, Tony
- Fired: Megan Fernandes & Tony Collins
- Reasons for firing: Megan for not stepping up as project manager, losing the pitch to secure Rock-It Boards, being a bit player in the previous task and Pero felt she didn't want the investment as much as the others. Tony for his poor negotiation skills, only making one sale and his mistakes in the previous task.

=== Week 8 ===
- Air Date: 28 Jun 2021
- Team reshuffle: Gabriel is moved to Tahi.
- Project managers: Michael (Mana) and Gabriel (Tahi)
- Task: Run a charity auction for the RMHC.
- Result: Tahi raised $9,285, Mana raised $12,670.
- Winner: Mana
- Reward: Getting pampered by Beauty on Demand at the house.
- Brought into the Boardroom: Gabriel, Erna (Stephen dismissed by Pero)
- Fired: Gabriel Elkhishin
- Reasons for firing: For lacking experience and appropriate skill set.

=== Week 9 ===
- Air Date: 5 Jul 2021
- Project managers: Vanessa (Mana) and Erna (Tahi)
- Task: Run a coach tour around Auckland for senior citizens.
- Result: Tahi made $2016, Mana made $1672.
- Winner: Tahi
- Reward: A picnic at the Parnell Rose Gardens.
- Brought into the Boardroom: Vanessa, Kennedy (Michael dismissed by Pero)
- Fired: Kennedy Anderson
- Reasons for firing: For struggling on the task and being less consistent than Vanessa.

=== Week 10 ===
- Air Date: 12 Jul 2021
- Team reshuffle: Stephen moved to Mana, Michael moved to Tahi.
- Project managers: Stephen (Mana) and Michael (Tahi)
- Task: Pitch for and fulfil a gardening contract at Pah Homestead, and sell gardening services door-to-door.
- Result: Tahi's total revenue was $220. Mana's total revenue was $390.
- Winner: Mana
- Reward: Massage at Sofitel Auckland
- Brought into the Boardroom: Michael, Erna
- Fired: Erna Basson
- Reasons for firing: Overshadowed by Michael in the task, and contribution towards losing the Pah Homestead pitch.

=== Week 11 ===
- Air Date: 19 Jul 2021
- Semi-finalists: Michael, Stephen, Vanessa
- Task: The top three undergo intense interviews with three of New Zealand's top businesspeople.
- Fired: Michael Wilson
- Reasons for firing: Couldn't commit to his new business on a full-time basis.

=== Week 12 (The Final) ===
- Air Date: 20 Jul 2021
- Finalists: Stephen, Vanessa
- Stephen's Team: Gabriel, Kennedy, Megan, Olivia, Tony
- Vanessa's Team: Erna, Kyria, Michael, Nicola, Shardae
- Task: Finalists pitch their businesses to Mike Pero, his advisors and a panel of industry experts.
- Hired: Vanessa Goodson
- Reasons for hiring: More commercially viable business, strong brand identity, passion and personality.
