= Rob Heyvaert =

Belgian businessman

Rob Heyvaert is the managing partner of Motive Partners, an investment firm focused on technology companies in the financial services industry based in New York, US and London, UK and former CEO & founder of the Capital Markets Company (Capco).

== Biography ==
Before founding Capco, Rob Heyvaert created Cimad Consultants and sold it to IBM, and then became general manager of Securities and Capital Markets at IBM.

In 1998, Rob Heyvaert founded Capital Markets Company (Capco). Capco helps financial services firms to accelerate the process of managing risk and regulatory change, reducing costs, and enhancing controls. In May 1999, Capco was chosen to overhaul the Indonesia Stock Exchange’s clearing and settlement system. From 1999 to 2000, the company's revenue jumped from $35 million to $100 million, with 900 employees.

In 2006 he appeared on the Belgian Flemish television channel VT4 in a television program called "De Topmanager," the Belgian version of The Apprentice.

In 2010, FIS acquired Capco and Rob Heyvaert became corporate executive vice president of FIS, member of the FIS Executive Management team, and responsible for the strategic direction of FIS's consulting services. In 2021, Capco was sold to Wipro for $1.45 billion.

In 2011, Rob Heyvaert bought the penthouse on 54 Bond Street in New York (in the former building of the Bouwerie Lane Theatre) for $13.5 million.

In 2016, Rob Heyvaert co-founded the company Motive Partners, a financial technology sector-specialist investment firm primarily focused on buyout and growth equity and has raised over $1.5 billion, with a team including Blythe Masters, Bob Brown and Richard Lumb.

Motive Partners has invested in technology provider companies such as Avaloq, Dun & Bradstreet (NYSE: DNB), Global Shares, With Intelligence and InvestCloud.

== Personal life ==
Rob Heyvaert lived with Bart Heynen. His partner deceased in January 2024. They have 2 children together.

== See also ==
- Dun & Bradstreet (D&B)
