= The Next Internet Millionaire =

- DVD Boxed Set
- Written by: Eric Holmlund
- Directed by: Eric Holmlund
- Country of origin: United States
- Original language: English

Production
- Producers: Joel Comm & Eric Holmlund

The Next Internet Millionaire is an online reality show hosted by Joel Comm and written and directed by Eric Holmlund. The world's first Internet reality show and based on the NBC show The Apprentice, the program was released entirely on the Internet in 2007. There was a $25,000 prize and the opportunity to work together with Comm on a project with the goal of earning $1 million.

== Production ==
Joel Comm of Loveland, Colorado, and Eric Holmlund of Fort Collins, Colorado, conceived of the show in 2007. After 300 potential entrants sent audition videos to producers, the first round of voting eliminated all but 50 contestants. People on the Internet were allowed to help select the contestants, though the final decision was made by Comm. The contestants were not allowed to include their Internet business endeavors, so that viewers could vote for them based only on their charisma. On July 17, 2007, six men and six women were chosen as finalists, from Canada, Costa Rica, England, and the United States. The reality show producers funded all of the contestants' trips to the filming location. The winner would receive a $25,000 prize and the opportunity to work together with Comm on a project with the goal of earning $1 million. They flew the contestants out to Loveland and began the two-week filming on July 22, 2007.

== Format ==
The Next Internet Millionaire was viewable only on the Internet; according to Canwest and the Lincoln Journal Star, it is the first Internet reality show. Author Michael A. Banks said it was the "first competitive Web reality show". The show had 12 episodes, which were released every Wednesday on the show's website. It was based on The Apprentice; the producers referred to it as the "online version" of that program and as "The Apprentice Meets YouTube". The contestants were expected to finish 12 assignments including making a website, copywriting, and Internet marketing. They were coached by roughly a dozen "Internet marketing experts" who write books about how they make money.

Executive Producer Joel Comm refused to put an exact figure on the costs but indicated that the series cost more than the independent Napoleon Dynamite, which cost $400,000 to make. Comm said that part of the goal of the show was to prove that it was possible to produce a real television-style show and distribute it online, bypassing the television studio system. He told the Denver Post: "Reality TV is huge, and online video is gaining momentum. My goal is to prove that Internet (video) is ready for prime time."

In November 2007, the show's final pitted Jaime Luchuck, a Canadian, against American YouTube celebrity Charles Trippy. In the final contest, Luchuck wrote the book Cubicle Slave to the Next Internet Millionaire and Trippy created a video series. Luchuck won The Next Internet Millionaire through her $70,000 sales of her book, while Trippy had only $39,000 sales of his video series. As her prize, Luchuck won $25,000 placed in a briefcase and one-third of her book proceeds. She said in a November 2007 interview with Canwest that although several United States employers had asked her to join them, she intended to stay in Toronto to manage the company she owns.

== Reception ==
Wired reviewer Adario Strange praised The Next Internet Millionaire for having a professional look, comparing it to a show on terrestrial television. Randi Zuckerberg criticized the show in The Daily Beast, writing that its primary failing was its host, Joel Comm, whom she called a "shameless self-promoter".

Duncan Riley of TechCrunch said he was unsure about whether to praise or criticize the show. He noted that the show is "slickly produced" and that parts of the experts' suggestions are "worth watching", specifically for people who want to do online marketing. He concluded, however, that The Next Internet Millionaire is just "a front for Joel Comm Inc." so that he can gain wider publicity, allowing him to increase sales of his e-books.

== See also ==
- The Benefactor – with Mark Cuban of the NBA Dallas Mavericks
- The Rebel Billionaire: Branson's Quest for the Best – with Richard Branson of the Virgin Group
- The Law Firm – with Roy Black
- Fire Me...Please/The Sack Race – where contestants try to get fired from their job
- My Big Fat Obnoxious Boss – a parody and hoax
