= Yahoo Games =

Defunct casual games website

Yahoo! Games
- Website type: Games
- Owner: Yahoo!
- Creator: Yahoo!
- Website: yahoo.com/games
- Commercial: Yes
- Registration: Optional
- Launched: March 31, 1998; 28 years ago
- Current status: Available in US and Japan

Yahoo! Games was a section of the Yahoo! website, launched on March 31, 1998, in which Yahoo! users could play games either with other users or by themselves. The majority of Yahoo! Games was closed down on March 31, 2014, and the balance was closed on February 9, 2016. Yahoo! announced that "changes in supporting technologies and increased security requirements for our own Yahoo! web pages, made it impossible to keep the games running safely and securely". It was then announced by Yahoo! that its games section would be dissolved completely on May 13, 2016. However, the Yahoo! games service is still available on Yahoo! Japan, along with Yahoo! Auctions.

== Features ==
The games on the web site were typically Java applets or quick Flash games, although some titles required a local download. Many of the games that required a download contained TryMedia Adware. Yahoo! Games also included Yahoo! Video Games, which provides news, previews, and reviews of currently available or upcoming First Party games–and Yahoo! Games on Demand–which provided free demos and full-size downloads of full PC games for a charge.

The site featured an "All Star" system for users, in which a user could pay to get an All Star username. All Star users were able to get extra privileges on Yahoo! Games sites such as disabling pop-up ads. All Star users did not have playable games without downloading.

Yahoo! Games was built on Yahoo!'s acquisition of ClassicGames.com (created by Internet entrepreneur Joel Comm and programmer Eron Jokipii) in 1997. The last used Yahoo! Video Games section of the site was formerly known as Games Domain, from back when Yahoo! acquired the web site in 2003. As of May 14, 2016, Yahoo! Games held over 1,400 games, most of which were developed externally.

== Games ==
=== Board games ===
Playable online (PO), Downloadable (D), Mobile (M), Skill (S)

- Backgammon PO
- Bingo PO
- Catan D
- Checkers PO
- Chess PO
- Chessmaster Challenge D
- Chester S
- Chinese Checkers PO
- Dominos PO, M
- Dots PO
- Emperor's mahjong D
- Go PO
- JigWords D, PO
- Jigsaw: Great Art D
- Jigsaw: Landscapes D
- Jigsaw: Medley D
- Jigsaw: Pet D
- Car Games
- Literati PO
- Luxor Mahjong D
- Mah Jong PO
- Mah Jong Adventures D
- Mah Jong Garden D
- Mah Jong Jade Expedition D
- Mah Jong Medly D, PO
- Mah Jong Towers Eternity D, PO
- Mah-Jomino D
- Mahjong Escape D, PO
- Mahjong Match D
- Mahjong Treasure S
- Mahjong Fortuna S
- Midas Mahjong S
- Monopoly 3 D
- Naval Command PO
- Poker Pop D, PO
- Reversi PO
- Saints and Sinners Bingo D, PO
- Sudoko: Latin Squares D
- Super Mah Jong D
- Word Slinger D

Up until March 2014, Yahoo! Games included a popular Internet chess server. Ten years earlier, in 2004, James Eade had recommended Yahoo! Chess as the best of Internet chess, writing that "action is to be found there at all times". Yahoo! Chess differed from more contemporary Internet chess servers in its complete lack of oversight regarding user conduct or chess engine use.

=== Card games ===
Playable online (PO), Downloadable (D), Mobile (M), Skill (S)

- All-in-One Solitaire, PO
- Addiction Solitaire D, PO
- Aloha Solitaire D, PO
- Aloha TriPeaks D, PO
- Ancient 4 in 1 GamePak D
- Ancient Hearts and Spades D
- Ancient Tri-Jong D
- Ancient Tripeaks D
- Blackjack PO
- Canasta PO
- Contract Bridge PO
- Cribbage PO
- Deuces Wild Video Poker PO
- Double Down Video Poker PO
- Euchre PO
- Five Card Deluxe D, PO
- Freecell Solitaire D PO
- Gin PO
- Go Fish PO
- Golf Solitaire D, PO
- Go-Stop PO, S
- Hearts PO, M
- Hold 'Em Poker PO
- Honey Combo S
- Hotel Solitaire D
- Klondike Solitaire D, PO
- Pinochle PO
- Poker Superstars II D, PO
- Pyramid S
- Pyramids PO, M
- Sheepshead PO
- Solitaire 13 D, PO
- Spades PO
- Super Solitaire D
- Super Solitaire 2 D
- Tornado 21 PO, M
- Turbo Solitaire D, PO

=== Other games ===
Playable online (PO), Downloadable (D), Mobile (M), Skill (S)

- Mushroomer PO
- Pac-Man D
- Pool PO
- TextTwist D, PO
- Tradewinds D
- Tradewinds 2 D, PO
- Tradewinds Legends D, PO
- Word Racer PO
- Yahoo! Graffiti PO
- Yahoo! Towers PO
- Treasure Hunt 2D, PO

== In popular culture ==
Yahoo! Chess was the subject of a song by the British rock band Half Man Half Biscuit on their 2008 album CSI:Ambleside. Entitled "Bad Losers on Yahoo! Chess", the song references a fictitious player, Dennis Bell of Torquay, Devon, who on losing a chess game signs out from the Yahoo! Chess server "Good game, Sir, do you want another bout? But Dennis ain't replying 'cos he's just signed out." The song also references Deep Blue.

== Relaunch ==
In around September 2023, Yahoo launched a redesigned Yahoo! Games section that is available for players in the United States only. The updated platform features a selection of classic games, like Jigsaw, Mahjong, Solitaire, Word etc.

== See also ==
- MSN Games
- Yandex Games
- PlayOK

== Bibliography ==
- Eade, James (2004). The Chess Player's Bible: Illustrated Strategies for Staying Ahead of the Game.
- http://www.usgamer.net/articles/yahoo-games-shutting-down-in-may-ending-a-major-piece-of-game-history
