= Terry Serepisos =

Greek-New Zealand businessman

- Born: Eleftherios Serepisos; 1963 (age 62–63); Greece
- Known for: Property development Wellington Phoenix; The Apprentice New Zealand

Eleftherios "Terry" Serepisos (born 1963) is a Wellington-based property developer and former owner of A-League association football club Wellington Phoenix. In 2010, he was the host in the New Zealand incarnation of the hit TV series The Apprentice. After a string of failed commercial property ventures, by 2011 he had accrued tax debts of NZD $41.4 million, and owed NZD $8 million to numerous banks, prior to his successful application for bankruptcy.

== Biography ==
Born in the village of Paleros Akarnania, Greece, Terry Serepisos and his family emigrated to New Zealand when he was two years old. Serepisos attended Rongotai College with All Whites legend Wynton Rufer.

== Business ==
Serepisos made his name in property development, having previously been involved in the Italian menswear and nightclub businesses. His Century City group managed a portfolio of properties in the greater Wellington area including commercial buildings, high-end inner city apartments, retail spaces and residential homes.

Prior to bankruptcy, he had invested in and developed a number of Wellington sites. These include the former Bank of New Zealand (Manners Street), a group of leaky homes named Maison Cabriole (Tory Street), National Bank Building (Courtenay Place), conversion of the Prudential Building (Lambton Quay), Century City Tower (former World Trade Centre, Victoria Street), Lone Star Building (Tory Street), Century City Carpark Building (Tory Street), and failed development of the IBM Building (The Esplanade, Petone).

== Sport ==
=== Wellington Phoenix ===
On 19 March 2007 it was announced that New Zealand Football would be entering a new Wellington-based team into the A-League and that Serepisos would be providing the one million dollars (NZD) start-up capital and be the club's sole owner. In the first season of the club, Serepisos played a key role in getting English footballer David Beckham and his Los Angeles Galaxy team to play an exhibition game against the Wellington club. In 2007 Serepisos was the recipient of the Mercure Wellington Sports Personality of the Year award for his contribution to sport in Wellington in the year that had passed.

Many New Zealand football fans believe that it was Serepisos' actions that helped get the New Zealand national football team into the 2010 World Cup. Serepisos has been open to agree with the argument "They say I'm the saviour of football in this country. Well, they're right."

On 23 September 2011, it was announced that Serepisos had relinquished ownership of the club after ongoing personal financial difficulties. Subsequently, a new consortium of 7 Wellington businessman headed by Rob Morrison took control of the club. Serepisos was declared bankrupt the following Monday.

It was revealed in 2012 that Serepisos was among the victims of Ahsan Ali Syed's Western Gulf Advisory loan scam.

== The Apprentice New Zealand ==
In 2010 Serepisos featured in the 13-week first series of The Apprentice New Zealand as the master to the would-be apprentices. The show aired in New Zealand on TV One. Thomas Ben won and was awarded a $200,000 employment deal working with Serepisos.

== Bankruptcy ==
After revelations that unpaid ACC debts could lead to the liquidation of his football club, it was revealed that Serepisos also owed $1.4 million in unpaid rates and ground leases to the Wellington City Council. On 26 September 2011 he was declared bankrupt at the Wellington High Court, and later discharged on 24 October 2014.
