= Western Gulf Advisory =

- Founder: Ahsan Ali Syed

Western Gulf Advisory was a supposed asset management company based in Bahrain and Switzerland. It was founded by Ahsan Ali Syed, an Indian businessman.

In 2008 Ahsan Ali Syed, claimed to have $8 billion and then formed Western Gulf Advisory. Another employee of Western Gulf Advisory is Omer Khan (their CFO).

In February 2011, Western Gulf Advisory and Ahsan Ali Syed purchased the Racing de Santander football club in Spain. WGA was initially touted as a suitor for the New Zealand-based Wellington Phoenix football club after its owner Terry Serepisos encountered financial trouble, but negotiations did not proceed after WGA's assets were frozen by a court order.

In 2014 Switzerland issued an arrest warrant for Ahsan Ali Syed over charges of fraud and money laundering in relation to Western Gulf Advisory.
