= Jürg Marquard =

Swiss businessman (1945–2026)

Honorary consul of Hungary to Central Switzerland
- In office 1 January 1995 – 14 September 2026

Personal details
- Born: Jürg Marquard; 13 July 1945
- Died: 14 September 2026 (aged 81) Zurich, Switzerland
- Citizenship: Switzerland
- Spouse: Rocio Marquard (m. 1985, divorced) Priscilla Ogilvie (m. 1991, divorced) Raquel Lehmann (m. 2008)
- Children: 5
- Occupation: Businessman; publisher; television personality

Jürg Marquard (13 July 1945 – 14 September 2026) was a Swiss businessman, publisher and television personality. As of 2022, he was among the 300 wealthiest Swiss, with a net worth of 500 million Swiss francs according to Bilanz.

== Early life and education ==
Marquard was born on 13 July 1945, the eldest of three sons, to Ernst Marquard (1913–1972), a dentist, and Simone Marquard (née Eggli).

His paternal ancestors immigrated from Germany and became citizens in Zürich in 1921. From an early age he was interested and engaged in journalism. After completing the Matura, he told his father he would not pursue a college degree and instead become a full-time publisher of magazines.

== Career ==
Marquard was able to borrow 1,000 Swiss Francs (US$3,200 in 2024) to start his first magazine Pop. Besides this activity he was engaged for several years as moderator of the Swiss Hitparade on Swiss Radio and was often referred to as "Mr. Hitparade".

After the founding period, in which Marquard edited Pop himself, the magazine became increasingly commercial and, after various mergers with other German youth magazines, it became Pop/Rocky, the second-largest German youth magazine behind Bravo. In 1998, Pop/Rocky was merged with the publisher's own youth and music magazine Popcorn, which had established itself as the international umbrella brand for the Marquard Media Group's youth magazine division. Marquard broke into the German-language magazine market in 1981 with the magazine Cosmopolitan. He later published those magazines exclusively in Poland and Hungary.

In early 2005 he became active as co-producer and protagonist of the reality series Traumjob, which has been a licensed version of Donald Trump's The Apprentice. This series achieved the highest ratings within Swiss Television. From 2019 to 2020 he was also active as investor in the Swiss version of Shark Tank, Höhle der Löwen, which aired on the private channel 3plus. where he invested in promising start-ups. He resigned from this position for medical reasons, and was succeeded by DJ Antoine. In 2019 he started to be involved in real estate investment and development activities around Lake Zurich. Together with development company Inizia AG and Urs Ledermann he formed LMI Property AG. He became the honorary consul of Hungary in Switzerland in 1995.

== Personal life and death ==
Marquard initially married Mexican-born Rocio, a native of Cancún, with whom he had a daughter in 1986. They divorced a couple of years later. On 19 August 1991, Marquard married American-born model Priscilla Ogilvie (born 1966).

He ultimately moved to Miami, Florida, US, where his children were raised.

On 22 July 2008, Marquard married his third wife, Raquel Lehmann (formerly Gubser; born 1963), also a former model, in a civil ceremony in St. Moritz. She was formerly married to Stefan Gubser, a Swiss actor and Roger Lehmann, a financier. Through this marriage, Marquard has two stepchildren.

Marquard resided in Herrliberg, Switzerland, on Lake Zurich. Between 1992 and 2022, Marquard was a long-term tenant at the tower penthouse "La Tuor" of the Badrutt's Palace Hotel, after he took-over the lease from Gunter Sachs. Since then, he hosted annual parties including a New Year reception where he often received over 200 guests until his death in 2026.

He retained a chalet "Chantarella" in St. Moritz and additionally owned a property, "Villa Le Mangabey", on Nevis in the Caribbean. He owned the 160-foot yacht Azzurra II.

Marquard died in Zurich on 14 September 2026, at the age of 81.
