= Joel Comm =

American author and Internet marketer

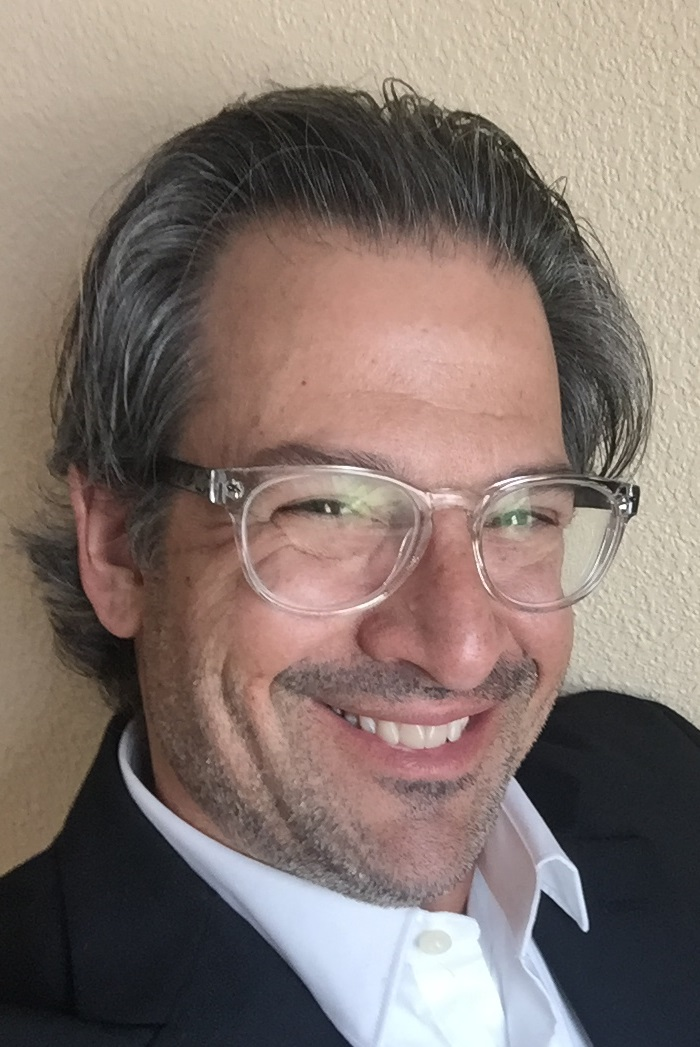
- Joel Comm circa 2015
- Born: Joel Comm; May 5, 1964 (age 62); Chicago, Illinois
- Known for: InfoMedia, ClassicGames
- Notable work: The AdSense Code, Twitter Power, iFart Mobile
- Website: joelcomm.com

Joel Comm (born May 5, 1964) is an American author and Internet marketer. Comm is the CEO of InfoMedia, a social media consulting company. Comm is the founder of ClassicGames, a family-friendly multiplayer gaming website he sold to Yahoo! in 1997 and was the precursor for Yahoo! Games. He is the author of The New York Times bestseller and Bloomberg Businessweek bestselling book, The AdSense Code.

== Career ==
Comm began his career as a radio personality and later worked as a mobile disc jockey before moving to Internet marketing.

Comm began using the Internet in the 1980s, experimenting with modems and bulletin boards related to playing computer games. In 1995, Comm started his first website, WorldVillage. WorldVillage is a virtual village created by Comm's company InfoMedia. The children's website offers trivia competitions and games. He maintained the site solely through online advertising. According to Radio Ink, he made several hundred dollars daily from Google's AdSense. Comm also founded DealofDay.com, WorldVillage's sister site, in 1999. DealofDay.com is a directory of several hundred discounts. Comm receives money from businesses every time his site refers a purchaser. The network of sites in 2003 had 130,000 members. Comm is the CEO of InfoMedia, a social media consulting company.

He created ClassicGames, a family-friendly multiplayer gaming website that offers widely played card games and board games like bridge, checkers, chess, Euchre, Go, hearts, poker, and spades. In 1997, he sold ClassicGames to Yahoo! for $1 million. Yahoo! used the acquisition as a basis for starting the website Yahoo! Games in April 1998.

In 2007, Comm conceived of the show The Next Internet Millionaire with Eric Holmlund. Based on the NBC show The Apprentice, it was an online reality show. Hosted by Comm, the show featured 12 contestants competing for a $25,000 prize and the opportunity to develop a joint venture with Comm.

Comm in 2008 created iFart Mobile, a best-selling app that he sold on iTunes Store. The app plays a fart noise when triggered. It has a "stealth" addition that enables people to set a timer for when the app will emit the fart sound. iFart further has a "security" feature that triggers a fart sound if the phone's position changes. The $0.99 app was ranked first on Apple Inc.'s App Store after its initial 14 days, having been bought 100,000 times. It used to be in the 20 most downloaded iPhone apps ever and in October 2010 had 20,000 reviews. In December 2008, VentureBeat noted that the iFart Mobile app was making Comm almost $10,000 daily.

Comm is a co-host of the Bad Crypto Podcast.

== Authorship ==
He authored The AdSense Code: What Google Never Told You about Making Money with AdSense, which describes for businesses how to achieve the highest revenue from Google's AdSense. It started as an e-book readers could purchase on his website, and in 2006, it was published by Morgan James Publishing. The book was on The New York Times Best Seller list and the Bloomberg Businessweek bestseller list in 2006. The New York Times described the book as a "user's manual for how to attract targeted traffic by a deeper understanding of Google Adsense code". In his 2007 book Clear Blogging, Robert Walsh wrote that despite The Adsense Code's having a "'Make Money Now!' tone", it was an "extremely useful book" for being successful with AdSense.

In 2009, he authored Twitter Power, a John Wiley & Sons-published book that introduces readers to Twitter, describing how it became widely used, how to set up a Twitter account, and how to grow their number of Twitter followers. The book received positive reviews in Entrepreneur, January Magazine, and Mint for being written with simplicity and without jargon. In CNET article titled "Twitter power? For real?", journalist Charles Cooper criticized the book for providing a "phony formula where you just paint by the numbers" to attempt to lure Twitter followers to become customers.

== List of books ==
- Internet Family Fun with Bonnie Bruno, No Starch Press (May 1997) ISBN 1886411190
- The AdSense Code: What Google Never Told You About Making Money with AdSense, Morgan James Publishing (1st 2006, 2nd 2010) ISBN 1933596708
- Click Here to Order: Stories of the World's Most Successful Internet Marketing Entrepreneurs, Morgan James Publishing (August 2008) ISBN 1600371736
- Twitter Power: How to Dominate Your Market One Tweet at a Time, John Wiley & Sons (1st 2009, 2nd 2010) ISBN 0470563362
- Twitter Power 3.0: How to Dominate Your Market One Tweet at a Time, John Wiley & Sons (March 2015) ISBN 1119021812
- KaChing: How to Run an Online Business that Pays and Pays, John Wiley & Sons (June 2010) ISBN 0470597674
- So What Do YOU Do? Discovering the Genius Next Door with One Simple Question, Morgan James Publishing (October 2013) ISBN 1614488517
- So What Do YOU Do? Discovering the Genius Next Door with One Simple Question: Volume 2, Morgan James Publishing (October 2014) ISBN 1630472514
- The Rockstars of JVZoo.com, Morgan James Publishing (April 2015) ISBN 1630475874
- The Fun Formula: How Curiosity, Risk-Taking, and Serendipity Can Revolutionize How You Work, Morgan James Publishing (June 2018) ISBN 1400201942
- Be the Legend, co-authored with Gene Frederick, Morgan James Publishing (October 2025) ISBN 1636988733

== Official website ==
- Official website
