= Morgan James Publishing =

American independent book publisher and distributor

- Parent company: Morgan James, LLC
- Status: Active
- Founded: 2003 in Virginia, United States
- Founder: David L. Hancock
- Country of origin: United States
- Headquarters location: New York City, New York, United States
- Distribution: Ingram Publisher Services
- Key people: David L. Hancock
- Publication types: Books, E-books
- Fiction genres: Non-Fiction; Fiction; Faith; Kids
- Imprints: Morgan James Faith
- Official website: morgan-james-publishing.com

Morgan James Publishing is an American independent book publisher and distributor, specializing in non-fiction, fiction, faith and kids categories.

== History ==
The company was founded in 2003 in Virginia by David L. Hancock. In their early years, Morgan James provided a hybrid of traditional publishing and a subsidy publisher model in which entrepreneurial business nonfiction authors pre-paid fees against the publisher's royalties to be published. Hancock became business partners with Guerrilla Marketing author Jay Conrad Levinson and together they published a series of non-fiction books.

In December 2008, the company was invited by NASDAQ to ring the opening bell and to recognize the book Do Your Giving While You Are Living by Eva Haller, which the company promotes.

In September 2013, the company launched an E-book bundling program.

In February 2015, the company signed a partnering agreement with Aerbook, and the Aer.io Retail Network to offer excerpts and sales of its titles using social media.

In August 2018, Morgan James Publishing announced a partnership with Publica. Publishers Weekly listed the firm as one of the fastest-growing independent publishers of 2014, 2015 and 2018.

== Publishing ==
Morgan James Publishing reports that it receives an average of 5,000 manuscript proposals each year and accepts and publishes an average of 150.

Two of the company's books have appeared on The New York Times Best Seller list for "Advice, How-To & Miscellaneous" topics: Launch: An Internet Millionaire's Secret Formula To Sell Almost Anything Online, Build A Business You Love, And Live The Life Of Your Dreams by Jeff Walker) and The Millionaire Messenger: Make a Difference and a Fortune Sharing Your Advice by Brendon Burchard.

== Notable authors ==
- Brendon Burchard
- Joel Comm
- Diane DiResta

== See also ==
- List of English-language book publishing companies
