= Linda L. Richards =

Canadian author and journalist

- Born: Vancouver, British Columbia, Canada
- Occupation: Author
- Genre: Fiction

Linda L. Richards is a Canadian author and journalist.

The founder and publisher of January Magazine and a contributing editor to the crime fiction blog The Rap Sheet, she is best known for her strong female protagonists in the thriller genre. Richards is from Vancouver, British Columbia, and currently makes her home in Phoenix, Arizona. The first book in her Endings series, the noir thriller ENDINGS, was published by Oceanview Publishing in 2021. A Publishers Weekly starred review said this "harrowing tale of love, loss, and the value of life is not to be missed." The third book in the series, DEAD WEST, will be published September 5, 2023.

== Biography ==
Linda L. Richards was born in Vancouver, British Columbia, Canada, and reared in Vancouver, Los Angeles, California, and Munich, Germany. She founded January Magazine in 1997 as an experiment in Web technologies in support of the computer books she was writing at that time.

In 2010, she was awarded The Panik Award (in honor of the late Paul Anik) for the best Los Angeles Noir for Death Was in the Picture.

In 2019, she was awarded The Arthur Ellis Award for best short story for "Terminal City" which appeared in Vancouver Noir.

== Bibliography ==
- Insensible Loss (2024) Oceanview Publishing
- Wild Horses: Running Free (2023) Orca Books
- Dead West (2023) Oceanview Publishing
- Exit Strategy (2022) Oceanview Publishing
- Endings: A Novel (2021) Oceanview Publishing
- Return From Extinction: The Triumph of the Elephant Seal (2020) Orca Books
- Vancouver Noir (2018) Akashic Books (Contributor)
- When Blood Lies (2016) Orca Books/Rapid Reads
- Fast Women and Neon Lights (2016) Short Stack Books (Contributor)
- If It Bleeds (2014) Orca Books/Rapid Reads
- Death Was in the Blood (2013) Five Star/Cengage
- Thrillers: 101 Must Reads (2010) Oceanview Publishing (Contributor)
- Death Was in the Picture (2009) St. Martin's Minotaur/Thomas Dunne Books
- Death Was the Other Woman (2008) St. Martin's Minotaur/Thomas Dunne Books
- Calculated Loss (2006) MIRA Books
- The Next Ex (2005) MIRA Books
- Mad Money (2004) MIRA Books
- Web Graphics for Dummies (1997) MIS: Press
- Teach Yourself Photoshop (1997) Henry Holt
- The Canadian Business Guide to Using the Internet (1995) Self-Counsel Press
