= The CfC-Stanbic Bank Magnate =

- Presented by: Kirika Mwangi
- Starring: Catherine Masitsa; Moses Nderitu; Gerald Wamalwa
- Country of origin: Kenya
- Original language: English
- No. of seasons: 1

Production
- Producers: Leakey Nduati; Lilian Geturo; Frank Muriungi; Kirumburu Ng'ang'a
- Running time: 45 minutes
- Production company: De-Capture Ltd

Original release
- Network: KBC; KISS TV
- Release: October 27, 2011 - 2011/10/29

The CfC-Stanbic Bank Magnate is a Kenyan business reality television show in which 14 participants compete in an elimination-style competition for a top prize of KSh.1.5 million/= (US$15,000) as seed capital for their business. The show typically ends with the 3 board members eliminating one of the contestants with the catch phrase, "You Have to Go!". The slogan of the show is "Winning is Just the Beginning".

The show first aired on October 27, 2011.

== Idea ==
The CfC-Stanbic Bank Magnate is a reality television show that starts with a group of participants vying to earn a top prize of KSh.1.5 million/= (US$15,000) as seed capital for their business idea. The participants are drawn from diverse backgrounds and regions across Kenya. During the show, these contestants live in close quarters testing their social skills as they balance co-operation with competition. The participants are placed into teams, and each week are assigned a task and required to select a team leader for the task. The winning team advances to the next task, while the losing team remains in the boardroom where the board members determine the person to go and is automatically eliminated from the show. The show was sponsored by CfC Stanbic Bank and premiered in October 2011.

Eliminations involves the losing team being confronted with their loss in a boardroom meeting. The team leader is then asked to select one of their team members who was the weakest link. The board members then determine who has to go as well as put on probation participants whom they believe underperformed in the task assigned.

The board members reserves the right at times to do the following: not allow the losing team leader to determine who has to go, and to let go multiple people who were on probation from the previous task and performed poorly on the task assigned. The board members also discourage quitting.

== Selection ==
The show aimed at identifying and recruiting extraordinary young business minds in Kenya who had limited personal resources but were keen to pursue their entrepreneurial dreams. Over 800 applicants from throughout Kenya applied to participate in The Magnate, with 96 participants short listed for interviews in Nairobi where they presented their business ideas to a panel of judges. The best 14 participants were then contacted to participate in the show. These participants were then assigned different rigorous tasks based on typical Kenyan business scenarios.

== Board Members ==
The board members are Kenyan entrepreneurs who have established companies worth billions of shillings. They include

Dr. Catherine Masitsa Rozsa She started off as a veterinary surgeon, going on to create a career in various multi-national organizations before she started her own company. She entered the a billion-shilling wedding industry in Kenya by creating Samantha's Bridal. She also Publishes other popular business and lifestyle magazines.

Mr. Gerald Wamalwa He quit employment at the age of 28 to start his own company Mellech Engineering and Construction. Starting with one pick-up and zero capital, he created a company in the construction industry in Kenya with a turnover of over a billion Kenya shillings.

Mr. Moses Nderitu He is a serial entrepreneur. He is known as the brains behind Excloosive Mobile Toilets that involved in the sanitation industry in Kenya especially for outdoor functions. He was ranked among the Top 40 Under 40 men in Kenya for his achievements at Excloosive Limited where he is the Founder and Managing Director(MD).

== Participants ==
Name	Age	Residence	Business idea	Date Leaving House
Paul Mwige	29	Nairobi	Car Hire Business - Pems Autozone	1st Runner-Up, November 22, 2011
Silvanus Osoro Onyiego	22	Meru	Direct Sales	December 8, 2011
Ryan Johnstone	25	Nairobi	Renewable energy	November 10, 2011
David Kamunde	23	Meru	Plastic Recycling	December 15, 2011
Kenneth Ng'enoh	28	Kericho	Biogas Fuel	November 17, 2011
Roy Nyagah Muriuki	24	Nairobi	Fuel Saving fuel - Hydrogen Fuel	December 8, 2011
William Waweru	25	Nairobi	Car Wash	December 1, 2011
Washington Koimbori	23	Kikuyu	Pectin Manufacturing Factory	3rd Runner-Up, December 22, 2011
Lina Marie Kotonya	29	Nairobi	Beauty Treatment - Maya Expo	2nd Runner-Up, December 22, 2011
Idah Maina	24	Nairobi	Coffee Shop	November 24, 2011
Kahara Kiarie	29	Limuru	Comparison Site	November 10, 2011
Peter Ruhiu Njogu	24	Nyahururu	Power Generation	November 3, 2011
Anne Githu	29	Nairobi	Fresh Produce	December 15, 2011
Vivien Mutimbia	29	Mombasa	Domestic Tourism - Mkenya Mtalii	WINNER (Season 1) December 22, 2011
David wokabi kamau	29	Mombasa	Business Sales consultant	June 8, 2013

== Episode 1 ==
Episode 1 covered the interviews of the 96 shortlisted participants out of the over 800 people who applied to participate in the show. The hopefuls underwent rigorous scrutiny to determine the 14 participants that will proceed to The Magnate Mansion. The interviews took place in Nairobi. This episode aired on October 27, 2011

== Episode 2 ==
The 14 participants chosen are introduced to the board members where they are given 2 minutes to present their idea briefly. At the mansion, they trained on disaster management, team building and entrepreneurial mentoring classes. They were divided to 2 teams namely

Team Deli fresh

Members

1. Anne Githu - Team Leader
2. David Kamunde Mwirigi
3. Kenneth Ng'enoh
4. Lina Marie
5. Peter Ruhiu Njogu
6. Ryan Johnstone
7. William Waweru

Team Ultimate

Members

1. Silvanus Osoro Onyiego - Team Leader
2. Kahara Kiarie
3. Paul Mwige
4. Roy Nyagah Muriuki
5. Idah Maina
6. Vivien Mutimbia
7. Washington Koimbori

The first task required the contestants to supplying fresh produce to Tuskys Supermarket in Nairobi. They were to go to the local market and purchase various fresh produce requires by their customer (supermarket manager) then sell to him at a profit. The team with the highest profits margins wins. They were then to prepare a report on the task assigned to them at the boardroom where the board members were to assess and determine the winner. The task tested on Time Management, Profitability, Ethics and Compliance with the Law, Pricing and Crisis Management. Team Deli fresh had some of the products rejected due to poor packing while Team Ultimate managed to sell all their produce. In the Board room, it was a straight victory for Team Ultimate with a profit margin of 10% while Team Deli Fresh made a loss of over KSh.1,200/=. The board members were not impressed by the 10% profit margin made by Team Ultimate but in the end it was Team Deli Fresh that had to lose one member. In the board room, Team Deli Fresh made even more mistakes by presenting the wrong figures to board members as well as not nominating one member who was the weakest link to take blame. Peter Ruhiu Njogu decided to quit which did not go well with the board members and had to go and subsequently leaves the show. Anne Githu, Kenneth Ng'enoh and David Kamunde Mwirigi were put on probation for lack of focus, presentation of wrong data as well as the team leader lack of leadership. This episode aired on November 3, 2011

== Episode 3 ==
This episode aired on November 10, 2011, on Kenyan TV Stations: Kiss TV and KBC. The remaining 13 participants remaining had had a reality check having been through the first board appearance and consequent eviction in the previous episode. They were more keen and highly anticipated the next task.

Week 2 began with a motivational session in the house. This was conducted by Susan Koinange (MD Koba Waters Ltd.) She encouraged the participants to form 'master-mind groups' or 'likeness teams.' These teams were to meet often in order to keep the team members inspired. She used the metaphor of making 'apple juice with the apples given to them.'

The task briefing was delivered differently. Instead of the Board meeting the participants and informing them, it was presented to them at the house by Kirika Kirimi in a sealed envelope. They were instructed to read the contents within and discuss it within 30 minutes. In addition, they were to nominate 1 participant who was to be 'immune' from eviction that week.

The Task brief of 2 November 2011 was read to the entire team by Roy Muriuki. It read: ...following last week's contest, the board was displeased and was of the feeling that neither of the teams executed the tasks with the diligence it deserved. To this end, the Board has decided to not personally attend the briefing. The Board sincerely hopes that this week's task will be taken more seriously and executed in a more fitting fashion...

The automotive and upholstery cleaning industry in Kenya consists of highly automated processes and other more manual processes in the country. The main performance criteria for such firms include acquiring new customers and earning daily profitability. In regional corporate training simulations involving business management, operational exercises often involve handling the processes involved in managing car wash within specific shifts, such as from 8:00 AM to 3:00 PM.

=== The previous 2 teams had been ===
Team Deli fresh

Members

1. Anne Githu - Team Leader
2. David Kamunde Mwirigi
3. Kenneth Ng'enoh
4. Lina Marie
5. Ryan Johnstone
6. William Waweru

Team Ultimate

Members

1. Silvanus Osoro Onyiego - Team Leader
2. Kahara Kiarie
3. Paul Mwige
4. Roy Nyagah Muriuki
5. Idah Maina
6. Vivien Mutimbia
7. Washington Koimbori

The second task brought the contestants to DGM Car Wash in Nairobi. Team Ultimate had deliberated to charge a minimum of KSh.150/= per car and were willing to go as high as the client seemed able to afford whereas Team Deli Fresh had decided to range between KSh.200/= - KSh.250/=. They were welcomed by the proprietor 'Caroline' and briefly oriented. She then gave them an envelope containing further instructions from the Board for them.

They were instructed to form 2 new teams ensuring that not more than 4 members form the previous teams were to be together again in the new teams! This was to be completed within 30 minutes.

=== The new teams ===
TEAM ULTIMATE

1. Kiarie Kihara - Team Leader
2. Roy Muriuki
3. Paul Mwige
4. Ann Githu
5. David Kamunde
6. Washington Koimburi

ULTIMATE HUSTLERS

1. Ryan Johnstone - Team Leader
2. Lina Marie
3. Vivien Mutimbia
4. Idah Maina
5. Sylvanus Osoro
6. Kenneth Ng'enoh
7. William Waweru

=== The challenges arising among the teams ===
- Duty allocation / division of labour
- Equipment preparation
- Customer acquisition
- Competing for the same clients (both teams were at the same car wash, getting cars from the same highway)
- The equipment not being versatile enough (e.g. the washing pipes being too short to reach all areas of some trucks to be washed.)
- Customer complaints
- Customers bargaining for the lowest price
- Convincing potential clients to pop in for a wash
- Stealing each other's clients
- Some dissatisfied clients
- Weather change (it began to pour rather heavily)
- Coordination between the sales team & the work-force
- Pulling in more cars than they could handle at a given time
- Washing the cars in a rush hence not cleaning them satisfactorily
- Having to pay for venue (which they discovered after they were done for the day)

=== Strategies ===
- The two teams each divided themselves into two groups; one went out to market themselves and attract clients while the other got down to cleaning the cars that came through!
- The sales teams were cut-throat - literally bringing traffic to a standstill!
- The teams using the rain - interruption of workflow to strategize further
- When told of the rental charge that they had overlooked, they bargained to cut down their losses

=== Point of caution ===
- The Task wasn't about washing cars but about running a car wash!

=== In The Board Room ===
==== Characteristics to remember about each Board member ====
===== Gerald Wamalwa =====
Seeks integrity & excellence and does not tolerate short cuts.

===== Dr. Catherine Masitsa =====
Evaluates the entrepreneur's risk-taking abilities and capacity to seize business opportunities.

===== Moses Nderitu =====
Seeks entrepreneurs, with an eye for opportunity.

==== What the Board members observed ====
===== Gerald Wamalwa =====
1. The Set price for washing a car at the car wash was set at KSh.150/= whereas some of the teams were charging higher than that.
2. This was a manual task and so cars were to be done one at a time
3. Financials would have to be discussed further because the bottom-line did not reflect well

===== Dr. Catherine Masitsa =====
1. Although profit was a key objective, it should not have been sought at the cost of customer satisfaction and quality assurance

===== Moses Nderitu =====
1. Some team members got into the clients' cars in order to lead them to the car wash, a violation of personal space
2. They were at liberty to utilize the 'manpower' at the car wash
3. The team leaders should have gone to negotiate with for additional labor since they were clearly overwhelmed hence finding out what the charge to be levied on them would be and then consider this

==== Boardroom Session ====
TEAM ULTIMATE	Board Comments	ULTIMATE HUSTLERS	Board Comments
Kiarie Kihara - Team Leader: expected passion, dedication, hard work, initiative	What were the Team dynamics	Ryan Johnstone - Team Leader expected: drive, entrepreneurial spirit	What were the Team dynamics
William Waweru - Had to seek out the client;	How was it different from what you do everyday?	Sylvanus Osoro - Maintain Team assets	What were the Team strategies?
Kiarie Kihara - Fluctuated depending on the client	What were the pricing strategies?	Lina Marie - They needed extensive cleaning and so I felt that this was a fair price to charge at the time	Why an overcharge?
Washington Koimbori - The attempt was made & they learned of the standard pricing	Seeking assistance from the business owner		
Paul Mwige - Management of all business aspects the same way that the original owner would do & understand the system and mechanisms involved	What did the objective of 'running a business' entail?		

 Board: The action of not going back to the proprietor of the business to ask for insight
  on how the business is run is as good as deciding that you have no need to understand the dynamics
 of that particular business!
 Board:  The teams did not understand the system and mechanisms involved and also manage 
 all business aspects the same way that the original owner would do

== Episode 4 ==
Training sessions. The contestants had a training session on Business Concepts and Models facilitated by Ruth Ogier of InvesteQ Capital Ltd. This enabled the contestants to set and know their goals as well as get the best out of their businesses.

Task The task briefing took place at Decor Den Office in Nairobi West by Nina Senanu, the proprietor of Decor Den. Task entailed interior design and furnishing Decor Den's new office in Nairobi west which was to serve corporate and home clients all in a budget of KSh.500,000/= (approximately US$5,600). The task was to be judged by the best idea and the best layout of the office. The contestants were divided into two teams;

Team Synergy

Members

1. Lina Marie - Team Leader
2. Sylvanus Osoro
3. William Waweru
4. Vivien Mutimbia
5. Idah Maina
6. Kenneth Ng'eno

Team Ultimate Consultants

Members

1. Washington Koimbori - Team Leader
2. David Kamunde
3. Ann Githu
4. Roy Muriuki
5. Paul Mwige

The teams were allowed to use Interior design consultants to advise on what is required. After shopping around for the suitable furniture, the office model as well as a three-dimensional (3D) soft copy showing the office space the teams went to present their proposal to their client, Nina Senanu, proprietor - Decor Den. Team Synergy provided four services namely interior decor, furniture, signage, and marketing the new location. They had two scenarios for the room. Scenario 1 had a green carpet while scenario 2 had red carpet. Team Ultimate consultants divided the office into four zones: the wet zone, workstation area, the boardroom and the reception area. After the presentation, The proprietor, Decor Den met the board members to brief them on the teams performance. Team Ultimate

Boardroom sessions In the boardroom, Team synergy were faulted on presenting that they had experience on interior design yet they had just started working. The board also faulted their office model which did not meet the standards of the client thus handing team Ultimate easy victory. Team Synergy remained in the boardroom for the eviction. The team leader, Lina was asked to pick two members she thought were weak to remain in the boardroom. She picked Idah and William. Finally, the board members deliberated and decided that the team failed for not understanding the client and the product she wanted by presenting a substandard product. The board decided that Lina and Idah were put on probation. William was appointed the team leader in the next task. Kenneth who was in charge of the design and the office model which was the main reason why they failed had to go. This episode was aired on November 17, 2011.

== Episode 5 ==
Training session The contestants had a motivation session facilitated by Daniel Mungai - Chef, Emma Daniel Creations. The session centered around entrepreneurship and the challenges one has to undergo to be successful.

Task The task entailed selling tickets for the fifth puppetry festival at the Kenya National Theatre. They were to create a sales and marketing strategy. They were briefed by Tony Mboyo, producer, Kenya National Theater. The contestants were divided into two teams:

Team Synergy

Members

1. William Waweru - Team Leader
2. Sylvanus Osoro
3. Vivien Mutimbia
4. Lina Marie
5. Idah Maina

Team Ultimate

Members

1. David Kamunde - Team Leader
2. Washington Koimbori
3. Roy Muriuki
4. Ann Githu
5. Paul Mwige

After brainstorming on the sales and marketing strategy, the teams presented to Annabel Karanja - Marketing Specialist and Trainer, InvesteQ Capital Ltd. During presentation, Team Synergy had a missing slide on the financial projection thus throwing the team in panic. The then hit the streets to sell 100 tickets for the show. Team synergy targeted the motorists and the pedestrians using direct sale. Team Ultimate targeted shop retailers but changed quickly to target the corporate.

Boardroom session In the boardroom, the teams had a brief recap of their sales and marketing strategy as well as what they did when selling the tickets. Team Ultimate was put to task on their marketing plan since they estimated that they were going to sell 200 tickets yet they were given 100 tickets to sell. There were some light moments when David said the figure was imaginary and no facts was used to support this. Paul was grilled for presenting a financial projection with wrong addition figures. On the other hand, Team Synergy didn't include the sales Projections in their financial analysis. There was a heated argument between the board members and David, the team leader of team Ultimate for not having any solid basis to rank his fellow team members as well as using "Imaginary" "I have no idea" and "I just thought". When the final scores were tallied out of 100 points, Team Synergy had 45.7 points while Team Ultimate had 59 points. This automatically made Team Ultimate the winners. Team Synergy remained in the boardroom for the eviction. The team leader, William blamed Idah for poor financial presentation and analysis yet the board had identified the team lost due to poor presentation. Finally the board decided since Idah was in charge of financial projection which was missing during presentation as well as being on probation on the previous task, she had to go. William and Lina were put on probation. This episode was aired on November 24, 2011.

== Episode 6 ==
Training session The contestants underwent a vigorous training on operations management facilitated by Gabriel Macharia - Operations Management, InvesteQ Capital.

Task The task entailed a board based business simulation that tested their leadership skills, decision-making skills, level of understanding, ability to learn and communicate, financial knowledge and general business acumen which was conducted by David Tanki of Lan-X Africa Ltd. The contestants were divided into three teams: Touch Limited

Members

1. Roy Muriuki
2. David Kamunde
3. William Waweru

Firestorm Limited

Members

1. Washington Koimbori
2. Lina Marie
3. Ann Githu

Eagles Limited

Members

1. Vivien Mutimbia
2. Sylvanus Osoro
3. Paul Mwige

The board based simulation was for the contestants to run a business which had employees, assets, expenses and money. The task required the contestants to produce and sell three products: Brown product worth KSh.3,000/= per piece, Yellow product worth KSh.2,000/= per piece and a Blue product worth KSh.1,000/= per piece. The teams were to prepare quotations based on their production and make bids for the customers who need a combination of all three products. The task required the contestants to bid for the most valuable combination of products while keeping the cost of production as low as possible. They were to be evaluated based on price, service, quality and credit terms. On the first day, Touch limited won since it was the lowest bidder. When reviewing the task and setting up the price controls, one member of Touch Limited, William, isolated himself from the rest of the team. On the second day, the teams decided to merge, share customers since they didn't have enough resources. they also developed a common pricing system. Finally, the teams results were tallied and were as follows:

Team	Sales	Net Profit
Touch	228	15,000
Eagles	165	-1000
Firestorm	224	0

Touch limited won for having the highest net profit.

Boardroom session In the boardroom the teams was put to task on the reason for merger. In the process, it was discovered that they did not include a mark up of KSh.15,000/= but some teams did not. This brought up disagreements among the teams. Even though Touch Limited won, they were put to task for not presenting financial statement and balance sheets. William was put on the chopping board for abandoning his team during the price negotiation period. According to the evaluation, the contestants were graded and were as follows; Roy - 24, David - 23, William - 16, Vivien - 22, Paul - 23, Sylvanus - 21, Washington - 24, Lina - 17, Ann - 21. William having the fewest points in the rankings as well as he had been on probation in the previous task, he had to go. Lina and Sylvanus were put on probation. This episode was aired on December 1, 2011.

== Episode 7 ==
Training session The contestants had a training session facilitated by Esther Mukaya of Google Kenya on the need for businesses to create websites and ways to reach customers using websites.

Task The week's task was delivered inform of a site visit to the Soft and Lovely factory in Nairobi where they toured thereafter on the task briefed on by Michael Kimani - Manager, Soft and Lovely Company. The task was to create an advertising campaign on various products made by the company. They were then allowed to consult Redsky advertising on the best approach for their campaign. The contestants were in two teams namely:

Team Aspire

Members

1. Vivien Mutimbia - Team Leader
2. David Kamunde
3. Ann Githu
4. Lina Marie

Team Ultimate

Members

1. Paul Mwige - Team leader
2. Sylvanus Osoro
3. Roy Muriuki
4. Washington Koimbori

Team Aspire set the ball rolling by brainstorming then shooting a commercial on the Soft and Lovely braid spray using "Tokelezea" (Slang for emerge) as their catchphrase for the TV commercial. During editing of the video commercial a rift developed on team aspire on the need to include other products as well as the need to include the company and where to place it. Team Ultimate decided not to have a TV commercial instead used a radio advert and fliers. Both teams then presented their final ad to the Soft and Lovely MD and Jerry Nyagah, Creative Director, Redsky Advertising. The board was then briefed on how the teams performed.

Boardroom session Both teams had to brief the board on the task. Team Aspire gave wrong financial projections to the board which did not go well with the board. Team Ultimate projected that the client will spend KSh.1.6 million/= then make sales of the same amount but they forgot to put a disclaimer on how long to make a profit. They also focused on use of banners and fliers which was not practical since most people don't read. Team Aspire ultimately won the task for creating a good advertisement campaign as well as practical solutions as well as their catchphrase "Tokelezea" which was trendy. Team Ultimate was put to task why they didn't get the market brief, Market target and the creative right. The board identified that Roy Muriuki was in charge of the creative and Sylvanus who was in charge of Market brief. The board was also infuriated by the contestants not owning up to the task they were doing. The board determined that the team lost because of poor message delivery, a task done by Roy Muriuki who was in charge of creative thus he had to go. The board also decided that Sylvanus was in charge of Market briefing as well as defining the target market which led to them losing the task. Sylvanus who was also on probation made it worse for him thus he had to go home. The team leader Paul Mwige was put on Probation. This episode was aired on December 8, 2011.

== Episode 8 ==
Site Viewing The contestants visited Kitengela Hot Glass where the owner, Anselm Croze facilitated the tour round the factory as well as advising the contestants on how to maintain a successful business

Task The task was for the contestants to advise a client (Stephen Gugu, Investment Director - InVhestia Africa) who wants to start a Financial Investment Training Business. This task was done individually. They had personal sessions to know more thereafter to advise and present what the client needs to do. This was to test what they have learned so far at the Magnate Mansion. After the presentation, the client met the board members to present the strengths and weaknesses of the contestants as follows:

Name	Positives	Negatives
Vivien Mutimbia	Good time management, Market analysis and layout of activities to be done	Chewing gum during the presentation
Lina Marie	Plan execution, step by step on what needs to be done	Poor presentation skills
Paul Mwige	Good use of Q&A session,	Didn't take a position on what the client needs to do
Washington Koimbori	Stuck to his position	Assumed and decided what the client wanted,
Ann Githu		Not taking a clear position on what the client needs to do.
David Kamunde		Poor presentation skills.

Boardroom Sessions

In the boardroom, the contestants were to explain what steps they took to advise the client. The Board asked questions according to the advice they gave the client. The contestants were evaluated then ranked according to:

1. The quality of questions asked and time management
2. Presentation of the plan
3. Market analysis
4. Refining of the value proposition
5. Recommendations given

The ranking scale was as follows: 1-Below Expectation, 2-Below Average, 3-Just met expectation, 4-Above average, 5- Exceeded expectation. On the task, the contestants scored as follows:

Name	Score
Washington Koimbori	3.1
Lina Marie	3.25
Paul Mwige	3.15
Vivien Mutimbia	3.35
David Kamunde	2.35
Ann Githu	2.9

David Kamunde and Ann Githu had to leave the Magnate Mansion for having the fewest points and having performed below expectation. This meant that Paul Mwige, Vivien Mutimbia, Washington Koimbori and Lina Marie qualified for the finals. This episode was aired on December 15, 2011.

== Season Finale ==
This was the Season Finale whereby the final four contestants were to pitch their business plans to a panel of Judges. The four finalists were

1. Lina Marie - Maya Expo
2. Paul Mwige - MD, Pems Autozone
3. Vivien Mutimbia - Director, Safari Hunters
4. Washington Koimbori - Pectin Manufacturing Factory

The finals were held at One Degree South Eco Boutique Hotel in Westlands (Nairobi) where the winner was announced. The board members were joined by a panel of Judges who were as follows:

1. Ken Ouko - Head of Corporate Banking, CfC Stanbic Bank
2. Terry Mungai - Ashleys Executive Salon
3. Allan Ogendo - InvesteQ Capital
4. Christine Kapkusum - Senior Associate, Portfolio - Acumen Fund

The contestants were then given 10 minutes to pitch their ideas to the judges then a question and answer session. After the presentation, the judges were to fill a scorecard on that particular contestants pitch and award marks according to: Quality of the presentation, The problem the contestants are trying to solve, The product that is coming to the market, How well the contestants understand the market they are trying to penetrate (Market Analysis) and Financial plan.

Pitch

Lina Marie - Maya Expo, a web portal to give an insight on how to maintain a youthful appearance ranging from diet, exercise to extremes like buttocks and plastic surgery. The investment (Price money) was to be used for:

1. Upgrading the website into a portal
2. Portal optimization
3. Hire key staff

The strengths included the marketing structure of the proposal. Some of the drawbacks for the proposal included, understanding the current market due to inflation, costing structure and cash flow (cash Burn rate before returns are seen).

Paul Mwige - Pems Autozone, a transport logistics and fleet management solutions. The investment (price money) was to be used for purchasing cars. The strengths included diversity of the product. Some of the drawbacks included financial projections (low net margins), investing in areas with low returns.

Vivien Mutimbia - Mkenya Mtalii, a product to encourage domestic tourism targeting saccos. The Investment (price money) was to be used for:

1. Setting office in Nairobi to co-ordinate activities
2. Video production
3. Boost marketing cost

The strengths included good returns, clear market and good financial market analysis. Some of the drawbacks included no clear strategy for the products

Washington Koimbori - Pectin Manufacturing Factory from fruits. The investment was to be used on setting up a Pectin factory in Kenya utilizing the available raw materials as well as having Pectin readily available locally. The strengths included innovation and viability. Some of the weaknesses include financial projections and practicability of the project since it has not started.

RESULTS

After the pitch, the scores tallied were as follows

Name	Score	Rank
Washington Koimbori	206	3rd Runner-Up
Lina Marie	209	2nd Runner-Up
Paul Mwige	270	1st Runner-Up
Vivien Mutimbia	339	WINNER

Vivien Mutimbia won KSh.1,500,000/= as the winner of The CfC-Stanbic Bank Magnate Season 1
