= Ahsan Ali Syed =

Indian businessman (born 1973)

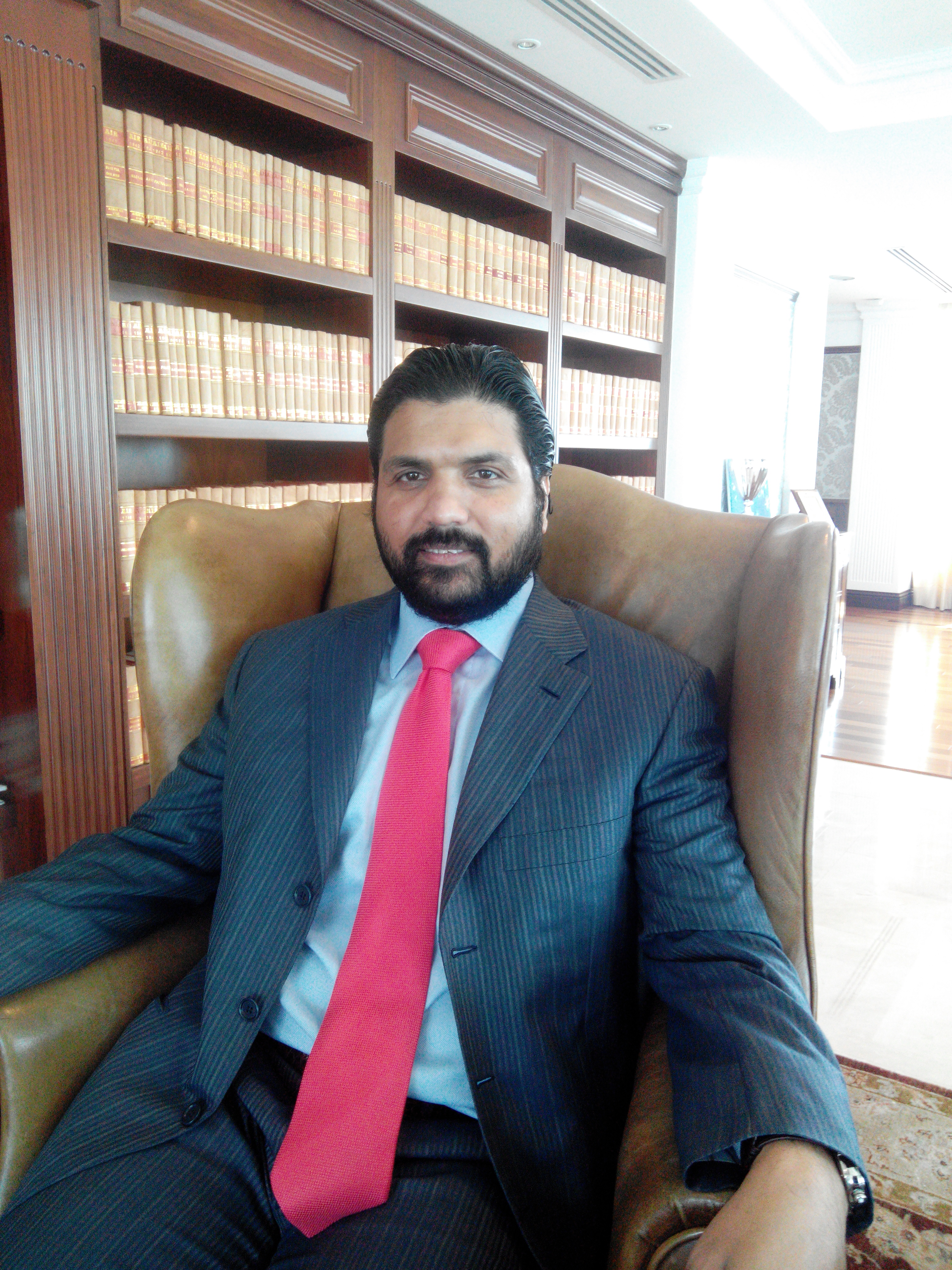
- Born: 23 April 1973 (age 53); Hyderabad
- Education: St Peter's College, Hyderabad
- Alma mater: Swami Vivekananda Law College, Bangalore
- Occupation: Businessman
- Spouse: Nikhat Fatima Ali Syed
- Children: 3

Ahsan Ali Syed (born 23 April 1973) is an Indian businessman. He is the founder of Western Gulf Advisory, estimated to be worth approximately 8 billion pounds.

== Career ==
Syed is the founder of Western Gulf Advisory.

== Allegations of fraud ==
Syed has been accused of being involved in various scams and rumours of unpaid taxes in the UK. In Australia and New Zealand he has been linked to a scam in which businesses paid upfront for loans which never materialised.

In July 2024, Syed, who had been remanded in custody, lost his final appeal against extradition from the UK to Switzerland.

The criminal conviction against Ahsan Ali Syed is not legally binding, and he maintains his innocence while his appeal of the July 2025 decision by the Zurich District is pending. The Swiss Federal Supreme Court did not rule on the core fraud allegations, instead, leaving the final determination of guilt or innocence to the Zurich High Court.

The Core Conflict reported Soy Pablo Puente. Further writes that a procedural review where the file moved past local vetting in the Silivri district and was directed to the higher regional systems of Istanbul and the Çorlu High Criminal Court (Ağır Ceza Mahkemesi) to determine where an ongoing investigation of this nature would legally reside as quoted by Soy Pablo Puente.
