= Capco =

Business consultancy company

The Capital Markets Company (UK) Ltd.
- Company type: Subsidiary
- Industry: Management consulting
- Founded: 1998; 28 years ago in Belgium as The Capital Markets Company NV
- Founder: Rob Heyvaert
- Headquarters: London, United Kingdom
- Area served: Worldwide
- Key people: Anne-Marie Rowland (CEO)
- Services: IT Consulting, management consulting, energy consulting
- Number of employees: 6,500+
- Parent: Wipro
- Website: www.capco.com

Capco is a British business and technology management consultancy, operating primarily in the financial services and energy sectors. Capco's operational headquarters are in London, England (approx. 1,500 consultants), with 32 offices across the Americas, Europe, and Asia Pacific.

The company offers services primarily in banking, capital markets, wealth and investment management, insurance, finance, risk & compliance. It also has an energy consulting practice in the US.

== History ==
Capco was founded in Belgium in 1998 by Rob Heyvaert as 'The Capital Markets Company NV'. It had offices in Antwerp, London, Toronto, New York, Warsaw, and Frankfurt. In 2001, the company rebranded itself to Capco, and the first issue of the Capco Journal of Financial Transformation was published by The Capco Institute.

In 2015, Rob Heyvaert left Capco with Lance Levy taking over as Capco CEO.

In 2010, Fidelity National Information Services (FIS) signed a deal with Symphony Technology Group to buy Capco for approximately $300 million.

In 2017, FIS sold a majority stake in Capco to Clayton, Dubilier & Rice (CD&R), a private equity firm based in New York, making Capco an independent company again. FIS continues to retain a 40 percent equity interest in the company.

On 4 March 2021, Wipro announced that it had acquired Capco for US$1.45 billion. The deal was completed on 29 April.

== Acquisitions ==
- 2007 - British-based City Practitioners Limited for an undisclosed sum.
- 2019 - Atom Solutions, a Houston-based IT firm.
- 2020 - Creative Construction, a Germany-based digital consultancy.
