= The Apprentice New Zealand =

New Zealand reality television series

- Genre: Reality
- Created by: Mark Burnett
- Starring: Terry Serepisos
- Country of origin: New Zealand
- Original language: English
- No. of series: 1
- No. of episodes: 13

Production
- Producers: RedFlame Media; Glenn Sims
- Running time: 60-minute episodes

Original release
- Network: TV2
- Release: 16 February – 11 May 2010

Related
- The Apprentice; The Apprentice Aotearoa

The Apprentice New Zealand is a New Zealand reality television series that aired on TV2 from 16 February to 11 May 2010. It featured Terry Serepisos, a Wellington based multi-millionaire property developer, as the chief executive officer. The series' winner, Thomas Ben, received a $200,000 package consisting of a $100,000 salary, a BMW and accommodation. Ben began work at Serepisos' property development company Century City in July 2010 but was fired the next year due to the Bankruptcy of Terry Serepisos. The series returned in 2021, under the title The Apprentice Aotearoa.

== Candidates ==
There were fourteen candidates taking part in this season and initially they were separated into two teams based on gender. The women chose the name Athena (also used as the female team name in the eighth season of the U.S. show), while the men chose the name Number 8. In the first episode, there is a twist as Nicky (Athena) and Richard (Number 8) are revealed to be already in a relationship. In episode 4, the teams picked project managers for the task Nicky and Chris and then were told that they would swap and lead the other team. In the boardroom in episode 6 Richard was switched to team Athena due to his excellence in the task even though his team lost. In episode 9 Nicky and Linda who had starring roles in the previous task had to select one member from their own team without conferring to switch to the other team, Linda chose Karen and Nicky chose David. In Week 11 Catherine and Karen swapped teams because they had not worked with the other person.

Candidate	Background	Original team	Age	Hometown	Result
Thomas Ben	Divisional Manager	Number 8	34	Auckland	Hired by Serepisos
David Wyatt	Media Agency Director	Number 8	27	Auckland	Fired in the Season Finale
Catherine Livingstone	Business Consultant	Athena	33	Auckland	Fired in week 12
Karen Reid	Healing Company Director	Athena	33	Auckland	Fired in week 11
Linda Slade	Business Student	Athena	21	Christchurch	Fired in week 10
Nicky Clarke	PR specialist	Athena	28	Auckland	Fired in week 9
Daniel Phillips	Senior Account Manager	Number 8	31	Auckland	Fired in week 8
Meena Chhagan	Senior Accountant	Athena	24	Wellington	Fired in week 7
Richard Henry	Getfrank Founder	Number 8	26	Auckland	Fired in week 7
Paul Natac	Local Government Manager	Number 8	28	Auckland	Resigned in week 6
Chris Whiteside	Accountant	Number 8	28	Christchurch	Fired in week 4
Kirsty Parkhill	Business Development Manager	Athena	35	Wellington	Fired in week 3
Lee Davies	Internet Company CEO	Number 8	29	Christchurch	Fired in week 2
Kim Laurenson	Company Director	Athena	27	Christchurch	Fired in week 1

== Weekly results ==
Candidate	Original team	Week 4 team	Week 7 team	Week 9 team	Week 11 team	Application Result	Record as project manager
Thomas Ben	Number 8	Number 8	Number 8	Number 8	Number 8	Hired by Serepisos	2-1 (win in weeks 3 & 11, loss in week 9)
David Wyatt	Number 8	Number 8	Number 8	Athena	Athena	Fired in the Season Finale	1-2 (win in week 1, loss in weeks 8 & 11)
Catherine Livingstone	Athena	Athena	Athena	Athena	Number 8	Fired in week 12	2-0 (win in weeks 5 & 9)
Karen Reid	Athena	Athena	Athena	Number 8	Athena	Fired in week 11	3-0 (win in weeks 2, 8 & 10)
Linda Slade	Athena	Athena	Athena	Athena		Fired in week 10	1-1 (win in week 6, loss in week 10)
Nicky Clarke	Athena	Number 8	Number 8	Number 8		Fired in week 9	2-0 (win in weeks 4 & 7)
Daniel Phillips	Number 8	Number 8	Number 8			Fired in week 8	0-1 (loss in week 2)
Meena Chhagan	Athena	Athena	Athena			Fired in week 7	
Richard Henry	Number 8	Number 8	Athena			Fired in week 7	0-2 (loss in weeks 5 & 7)
Paul Natac	Number 8	Number 8				Resigned in week 6	0-1 (loss in week 6)
Chris Whiteside	Number 8	Athena				Fired in week 4	0-1 (loss in week 4)
Kirsty Parkhill	Athena					Fired in week 3	0-1 (loss in week 3)
Lee Davies	Number 8					Fired in week 2	
Kim Laurenson	Athena					Fired in week 1	0-1 (lost in week 1)

No.	Candidate	Elimination chart												
No.	Candidate	1	2	3	4	5	6	7	8	9	10	11	12	13
1	Thomas	IN	IN	WIN	IN	IN	BR	IN	IN	LOSE	IN	WIN	IN	WIN
2	David	WIN	IN	IN	IN	BR	IN	IN	LOSE	IN	BR	LOSE	IN	FIRED
3	Catherine	BR	IN	IN	BR	WIN	IN	BR	IN	WIN	BR	IN	FIRED	
4	Karen	IN	WIN	BR	BR	IN	IN	IN	WIN	BR	WIN	FIRED		
5	Linda	IN	IN	IN	IN	IN	WIN	BR	IN	IN	FIRED			
6	Nicky	IN	IN	BR	WIN	IN	IN	WIN	BR	FIRED				
7	Daniel	IN	LOSE	IN	IN	IN	BR	IN	FIRED					
8	Meena	IN	IN	IN	IN	IN	IN	FIRED						
9	Richard	IN	IN	IN	IN	LOSE	IN	FIRED						
10	Paul	IN	BR	IN	IN	BR	QUIT							
11	Chris	IN	IN	IN	FIRED									
12	Kirsty	BR	IN	FIRED										
13	Lee	IN	FIRED											
14	Kim	FIRED												

The candidate was on the losing team.
The candidate was hired and won the competition. Was later fired due to the Bankruptcy of Terry Serepisos.
The candidate won as project manager on his/her team.
The candidate lost as project manager on his/her team.
The candidate was brought to the final boardroom.
The candidate was fired.
The candidate lost as project manager and was fired.
The candidate lost as project manager and resigned.

== Challenges ==
=== Week 1 ===
- Air Date: 16 February 2010
- Project managers: Kim (Athena) and David (Number 8)
- Task: To sell BBQ'd food in Auckland city centre. The team that makes the most profit wins
- Result: Athena made a $511.50 profit against Number 8's $711.00
- Winner: Number 8
- Reward: Dinner at Dine by Peter Gordon
- Brought into the boardroom: Kim, Catherine and Kirsty
- Fired: Kim Laurenson
- Reasons for firing: For poor leadership and bringing Kirsty back for seemingly no reason.

=== Week 2 ===
- Air Date: 23 February 2010
- Project managers: Daniel (Number 8) and Karen (Athena)
- Task: Put on a fashion show which exhibits the latest innovation in women's underwear from jockey; the next generation of the no panty line promise range
- Result: Number 8 won the creativity and originality part of the task but Athena win the presentation side of the challenge and the overall brand integration.
- Winner: Athena
- Reward: Taking a helicopter to the 140 ft super catamaran Island Passage
- Brought into the boardroom: Daniel, Lee and Paul
- Fired: Lee Davies
- Reasons for firing: For his arrogance, not listening to his teammates and lack of professionalism by drinking on the task.

=== Week 3 ===
- Air Date: 2 March 2010
- Project managers: Kirsty (Athena) and Thomas (Number 8)
- Task: To sell new Magnum Ice Cream Sandwich Auckland city centre. The team that makes the most profit wins
- Result: Athena made a $1,071.30 profit against Number 8's $1,490.00
- Winner: Number 8
- Reward: Number 8 get to go bungy jumping with Tamati Coffey
- Brought into the boardroom: Kirsty, Karen and Nicky
- Fired: Kirsty Parkhill
- Reasons for firing: For a lack of leadership & control over Athena.

=== Week 4 ===
- Air Date: 9 March 2010
- Team reshuffle: Nicky and Chris switched teams.
- Project managers: Chris (Athena) and Nicky (Number 8)
- Task: To create an online marketing campaign for a Microsoft product.
- Result: Number 8 won all five categories in the task.
- Winner: Number 8
- Reward: Pampering at East Day Spa
- Brought into the boardroom: Chris, Catherine and Karen
- Fired: Chris Whiteside
- Reasons for firing: For lying, being a poor leader and showing the competition his team's presentation.

=== Week 5 ===
- Air Date: 16 March 2010
- Project managers: Catherine (Athena) and Richard (Number 8)
- Task: To Create and to make a Subway sub to sell to the public of New Zealand.
- Winner: Athena
- Reward: A free handset from a telecom store, and a 10 minutes phonecall to loved ones/family
- Brought into the boardroom: Richard, Paul and David
- Fired: No One, Terry felt that both teams had done well on the task.

=== Week 6 ===
- Air Date: 23 March 2010
- Project managers: Linda (Athena) and Paul (Number 8)
- Task: To develop a concept and sell a Bus Tour around Auckland.
- Winner: Athena
- Reward: Watch a Horse Race at Ellerslie Race Course, Richard accompanied Athena on their reward due to being judged as the best performer on Number 8.
- Brought into the boardroom: Paul, Daniel and Thomas (Paul honorably took the blame as the leader for Number 8)
- Asked to be fired: Paul Natac

=== Week 7 ===
- Air Date: 30 March 2010
- Project managers: Richard(Athena) and Nicky(Number 8)
- Task: Renovate, Re-Decorate, and Rent an apartment at Lighter Quay.
- Winner: Number 8
- Reward: A round of golf together with Terry Serepisos and his two assistants
- Brought into the boardroom: Catherine, Linda and Meena
- Fired: Richard Henry and Meena Chhagan
- Reasons for firing: Richard for lying and trying to cover up any actual problems in his team. Meena for lying to Mr. Serepisos' face despite all the candidates being warned they would be fired solely on lying.
- Notes: Richard is fired before the results of the task are even revealed. Serepisos stated that he and his advisers "see and hear everything". He warned everyone that he would fire anyone being dishonest. Meena later lied again to Serepisos, and ended up being fired for that sole reason.

=== Week 8 ===
- Air Date: 6 April 2010
- Project managers: Karen(Athena) and David(Number 8)
- Task: To create a 30-second television commercial for Seek.co.nz.
- Winner: Athena by default. Number 8's commercial made use of a competitor's similar slogan and, thus, was disqualified, despite winning all the categories in the task.
- Reward: Jet skiing at the beach.
- Brought into the boardroom: David, Nicky and Daniel
- Fired: Daniel Phillips
- Reasons for firing: For someone who works in the advertising agency, Daniel should have been able to pick up on the similarity of the slogans.

=== Week 9 ===
- Air Date: 13 April 2010
- Project managers: Catherine(Athena) and Thomas(Number 8)
- Task: To create a Cereal brand for NZ kids
- Winner: Athena
- Reward: Ferrari Riding at the Hampton Downs Racecourse, near Auckland
- Brought into the boardroom: Thomas, Karen and Nicky
- Fired: Nicky Clarke
- Reasons for firing: Serepisos felt that she didn't want it as much as the others.

=== Week 10 ===
- Air Date: 20 April 2010
- Project managers: Karen(Number 8) and Linda(Athena)
- Task: To sell bottled water (a brand product of Richie McCaw and Ali Williams)
- Winner: Number 8
- Reward: $4500 to spend at Sony Centre, New Market
- Brought into the boardroom: Linda, Catherine and David
- Fired: Linda Slade
- Reasons for firing: For poor leadership, not selling enough water and allowing herself to become distracted by Richie McCaw.

=== Week 11 ===
- Air Date: 27 April 2010
- Project managers: Thomas (Number 8) and David (Athena)
- Task: To Teach Elderly People how to use the newest technology
- Winner: Number 8
- Reward: One night at a luxury hotel and 1 phone call to their loved one
- Brought into the boardroom: David and Karen
- Fired: Karen Reid
- Reasons for firing: Despite being honest and outspoken, Karen is not seen as a team player based on her interactions with her teammates.

=== Week 12 (Finale, Part 1) ===
- Air Date: 4 May 2010
- Fired: Catherine Livingstone (fired prior to task)
- Reasons for firing: Terry felt she was a bit too untrustworthy to work for him.
- Task (Part 1): To sell a luxury apartment
- Winner: Thomas Ben

=== Week 13 (Finale, Part 2) ===
- Air Date: 9 May 2010
- Task (Part 2): To organize a charity fundraising auction for (Cure Kids).
- Thomas's Team: Nicky, Paul, Catherine
- David's Team: Daniel, Linda, Karen
- Fired: David Wyatt
- The Apprentice: Thomas Ben
