= January Magazine =

Online book-related magazine

- Website type: Online magazine
- Available in: English
- Website: januarymagazine.com
- Launched: 1997; 29 years ago
- Current status: Active

January Magazine is an internet-based book-related publication. Founded by author Linda L. Richards in 1997, January Magazine has added various sections and offshoot publications since. The magazine is physically based in Vancouver, British Columbia, Canada, but works with contributors all over the world. The mandate of the publication is "books in the English language."

January Magazine is recognized for its "well-written" book reviews as well as the author interviews it has published, including exchanges with Salman Rushdie, Dennis Lehane, Loren D. Estleman, Stuart M. Kaminsky, Margaret Atwood and others. January Magazine's crime-fiction section won a Gumshoe Award for Best Crime Fiction Website in 2005.

In May 2006, the magazine's crime-fiction newsletter, The Rap Sheet, was spun off as a completely independent blog under the editorship of crime-fiction editor and Seattle media personality J. Kingston Pierce. The Rap Sheet and January Magazine maintain a cooperative association, with Richards and Pierce contributing to both publications.
