= Biodun Shobanjo =

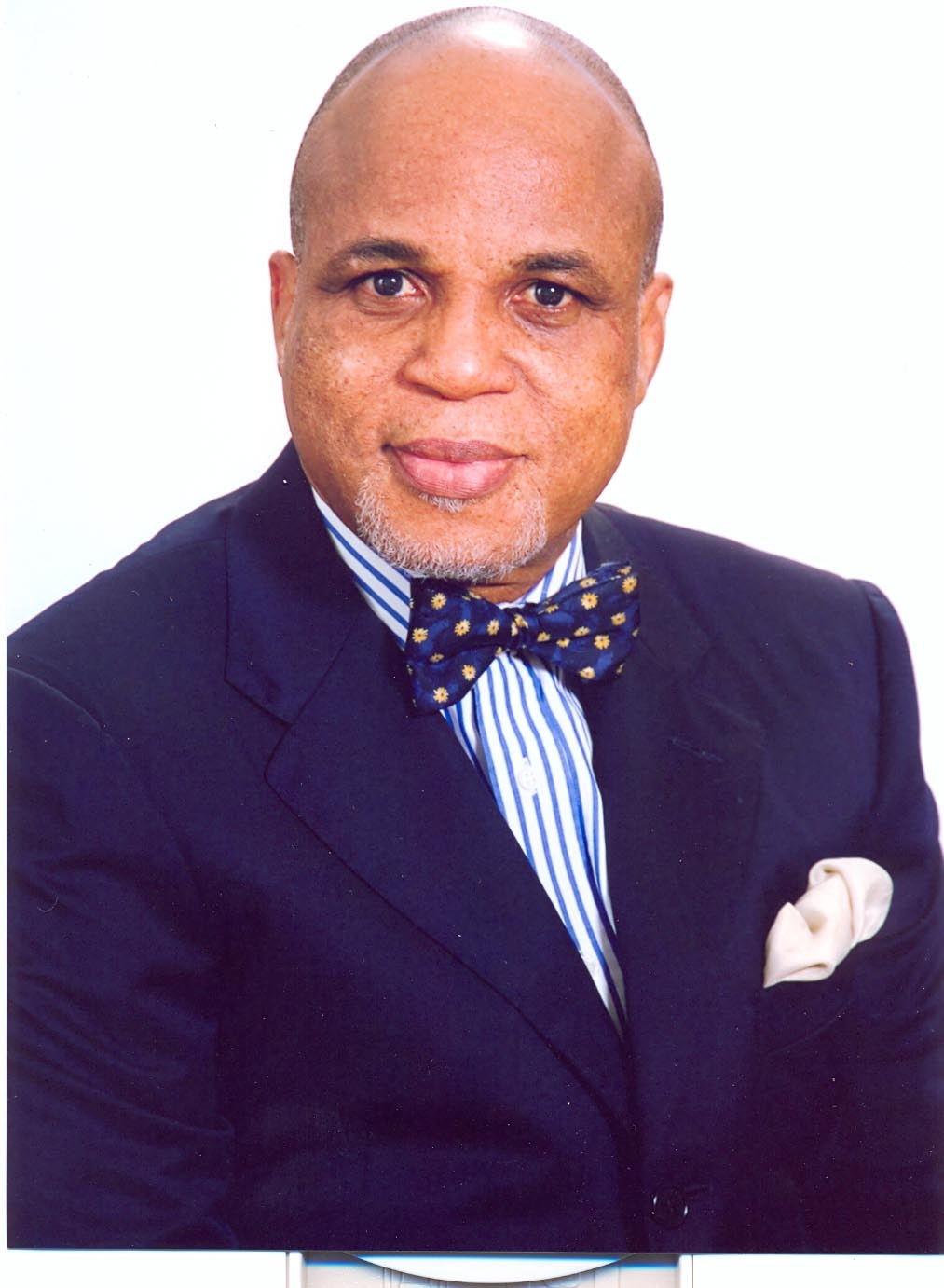
- Biodun Shobanjo Official picture

Chairman, Troyka

Personal details
- Born: 1944 (age 81–82) Jebba, Kwara State

Biodun Shobanjo is the Chairman of Troyka.

== Early life ==
Shobanjo lost his father at the age of 15 years, which ushered the turning point in his life and a 'half scholarship'.
