= Ruth Badger =

British businesswoman (born 1978)

- Born: March 1978 (age 48); Wolverhampton
- Occupation: Businesswoman

Ruth Badger (born March 1978) is a British businesswoman, best known as the 2006 runner-up in the second series of the British version of reality TV show The Apprentice, in which contestants compete for a £100,000-a-year job working for British business magnate Sir Alan Sugar. She has also presented her own TV show, Badger or Bust, and done various other TV work.

Badger has her own consultancy firm, Ruth Badger Consultancy Ltd, with offices in Salford Quays, Salford, and runs North West Money, a company which provides finance for homeowners.

== Biography ==
Born in Wolverhampton, Badger was educated at Wodensfield Primary School in Wednesfield and then at Our Lady & St Chad RC comprehensive school, leaving in 1995 with 3 GCSEs. She then worked as a civil servant at her local Jobcentre. During this period she also worked as a barmaid at several pubs in Wolverhampton and as a steward at Wolverhampton Wanderers Football Club. After several years as a civil servant, she started working in the finance industry, earning "National Employee of the year" awards with GE Capital in Wolverhampton. Ruth went on to greater success in 2002 with Compass Finance Limited near Manchester. She played a fundamental role in its stock market flotation, increased turnover and achieved an executive-level position at the young age of 24.

== The Apprentice ==
Prior to appearing on The Apprentice, Badger worked as a senior management executive for Compass Finance.

Despite being on many losing teams, Badger excelled in many of the task challenges, most notably the car sales in week six and the flat-letting in week nine (although she was on the losing team on both occasions). She was brought into the boardroom on four occasions and had altercations with fellow contestants Mani Sandher in week five and Syed Ahmed in week ten.

During the airing of The Apprentice Badger came to the attention of the British press. She is openly lesbian and has now divorced her husband who sold their story to the tabloids.

Badger appeared on The Apprentice spin-off show The Apprentice: You're Fired! on 27 May 2008 following Michael Sophocles, and again on 5 November 2014 during the show's 10th series.

== National Television Awards nomination ==
Badger was nominated for a National Television Award, for which she competed against fellow The Apprentice contestant Syed Ahmed and Big Brother 7 housemate Nikki Grahame, amongst others. Badger failed to make it through to the second stage of online voting and the award was eventually won by Grahame.

== The Big Idea ==
Badger featured on The Big Idea on Sky One in 2006, which gave "budding entrepreneurs" the chance to showcase their inventions. Viewers and a studio audience eventually chose a winner who was given a £100,000 investment to build and market their idea. The winner was Cyclaire, which was one of the products backed by Ruth Badger.

== Badger or Bust ==
Badger was the star of her own show, Badger or Bust, on Sky One, which started on 8 May 2007 and finished in autumn 2007. In this show she used her sales expertise to help failing businesses.

== Television and other appearances ==
Badger has also appeared on episodes of Big Brother's Little Brother and as a panellist on Channel 4 show 8 Out of 10 Cats. On 4 December 2008, Badger appeared on the BBC show Bargain Hunt Famous Finds against socialite Tamara Beckwith. Badger also appeared on the BBC quiz show Pointless Celebrities, where she made it to the semi-final.

== See also ==
- List of residents of Wolverhampton
