= Michelle Dewberry =

British businessperson

- Born: Michelle Louise Faye Dewberry; 9 October 1979 (age 46); Kingston upon Hull, East Yorksire England
- Occupations: Businesswoman; presenter; media personality
- Partner: Simon Jordan

Michelle Louise Faye Dewberry (born 9 October 1979) is a British businesswoman, presenter, and media personality.

Dewberry won the second series of the British television programme The Apprentice.

== Early life ==
Dewberry was born and raised on a council estate in Kingston upon Hull, Humberside, England. Leaving school at 16 with two GCSEs, Dewberry worked at St John Ambulance, KCOM and Kwik-Save. When Dewberry was seventeen, her nineteen-year-old sister, Fiona, was killed when she fell from a building.

After working her way through the ranks at Kingston Communications, Dewberry was head-hunted by ISP Tiscali as a project manager. After a successful period at Tiscali, and aged 24, she decided to start her own business, a "transformation consultancy".

== The Apprentice ==
In 2006 Dewberry won the second British series of reality TV show The Apprentice, in which candidates compete for a £100,000-a-year (at the time) job working for businessman Alan Sugar.

== After The Apprentice ==
In 2006 Dewberry started a business consultancy.

In 2007 she published her autobiography, Anything is Possible. In December 2009, Dewberry joined the magazine Business Matters as a monthly columnist.

She appeared on ITV gameshow The Chase in 2016 alongside Olympic ski jumper Eddie the Eagle and musician Shaun Ryder. She got through to the final with Edwards but failed to beat Paul Sinha. She was awarded £1,000 which she gave to a charity for abused women.

In April and October 2017, Dewberry made appearances on BBC's Question Time. She appeared on the programme again in March 2018. She was a frequent panellist on The Pledge on Sky News.

In 2021, it was announced that Dewberry would join the news channel GB News with a prime time show. Dewbs & Co airs at 6 pm on weeknights on the channel.

== Politics ==
Dewberry stood as an independent pro-Brexit candidate in the 2017 general election in Hull West and Hessle. She came fourth out of seven candidates, with 5.5% of the vote. She stood again in Hull West and Hessle in the 2019 general election for the Brexit Party. She came third with 18% of the vote.

She is a supporter of capital punishment.

== Charity work ==
In 2007, Dewberry ran the London Marathon in 4 h 33 min 20 s to raise funds and awareness for the NSPCC. She also ran in 2009. She is also an ambassador for Women's Aid and The Prince's Trust.

== Personal life ==
She was in a relationship with fellow Apprentice contestant Syed Ahmed during and after the show, before their relationship ended in late 2006. Dewberry has spoken about her struggles with mental health, depression and suicidal thoughts.

On 22 July 2020, after experiencing PPROM at just 28 weeks pregnant, Dewberry gave birth nine weeks early to her first child, a baby boy. Dewberry's partner and father of their son is businessman and former Crystal Palace Football Club owner Simon Jordan.

== Electoral history ==
=== 2017 general election ===
2017 general election: Kingston upon Hull West and Hessle
Party	Candidate	Votes	%	±%
Labour	Emma Hardy	18,342	53.1	+3.9
Conservative	Christine Mackay	10,317	29.8	+12.3
Liberal Democrats	Claire Thomas	2,210	6.4	−3.6
Independent	Michelle Dewberry	1,898	5.5	+5.5
UKIP	Gary Shores	1,399	4.0	−15.9
Green	Mike Lammiman	332	1.0	−2.0
Libertarian	Will Taylor	67	0.2	+0.2
Majority		8,025	23.3	−6.0
Turnout		34,565	57.4	+3.6
Registered electors		60,181		
Labour hold		Swing	−4.2	

=== 2019 general election ===
2019 general election: Kingston upon Hull West and Hessle
Party	Candidate	Votes	%	±%
Labour	Emma Hardy	13,384	42.0	−11.1
Conservative	Scott Bell	10,528	33.0	+3.2
Brexit Party	Michelle Dewberry	5,638	17.7	+17.7
Liberal Democrats	David Nolan	1,756	5.5	−0.9
Green	Mike Lammiman	560	1.8	+0.8
Majority		2,856	9.0	−14.3
Turnout		31,356	52.8	−5.5
Registered electors		60,409		
Labour hold		Swing	−7.1	

== Notes ==
Preceded by Timothy Campbell	The Apprentice winner Series 2 (2006)	Succeeded by Simon Ambrose
