= Communications in the Isle of Man =

The Isle of Man has an extensive communications infrastructure consisting of telephone cables, submarine cables, and an array of television and mobile phone transmitters and towers.

== Telecommunications ==
=== Telegraph ===
The history of Manx telecommunications starts in 1859, when the Isle of Man Electric Telegraph Company was formed on the Island with the intention of connecting across the Island by telegraph, and allowing messages to be sent onwards to the UK. In August 1859, a 36-nautical-mile (67 km; 41 mi) long cable was commissioned from Glass, Elliot and Company of Greenwich and laid from Cranstal (north of Ramsey) to St Bees in Cumbria using the chartered cable ship Resolute. The cable was single-core, with gutta-percha insulation.

Twenty miles of overhead cable were also erected from Cranstal south to Ramsey, and on to Douglas. In England, the telegraph was connected to Whitehaven and the circuits of the Electric Telegraph Company.

The telegraph offices were located at 64 Athol Street, Douglas (also the company's head office) and at East Quay, Ramsey (now Marina House).

On 10 August 1860 the company was statutorily incorporated by the Isle of Man Electric Telegraph Company's Act 1860, an Act of Tynwald with a capital of £5,500.

An Act to incorporate the Isle of Man Electric Telegraph Company and to enable such company to make arrangements for the working of Telegraphs in the Isle of Man.

The currents at Cranstal proved too strong, and in 1864 the cable was taken up and relaid further south, at Port-e-Vullen in Ramsey Bay. It was later relaid to land even further south at Port Cornaa.

Following the 1869 finalisation of UK telegraph nationalisation into a General Post Office monopoly, the Isle of Man Electric Telegraph Company was nationalised in 1870 under the Telegraph Act 1870 (33 & 34 Vict. c. 88) (an act of Parliament) at a cost to the British Government of £16,106 (paid in 1872 following arbitration proceedings over the value). Prior to nationalisation, the Island's telegraph operations had been performing poorly and the company's share price valued it at around £100.

Subsequent to nationalisation, operations were taken over by the GPO. The internal telegraph system was extended within a year to Castletown and Peel, however by then the previous lack of modern communications in Castletown had already started the Isle of Man Government on its move to Douglas.

Due to increasing usage in the years following nationalisation, further cables between Port Cornaa and St Bees were laid in 1875 and 1885.

By 1883 Smith's Directory listed several telegraph offices operated by the Post Office, in addition to those at Douglas, Ramsey, Castletown and Peel the telegraph was also available at Laxey, Ballaugh, and Port St. Mary.

Throughout the First World War, the cable landing station at Port Cornaa was guarded by the Isle of Man Volunteer Corps.

The undersea telegraph cables have been disused since the 1950s, but remain in place.

=== Teleport ===
A Teleport, with several earth stations, is currently under construction in the Isle of Man. SES Satellite Leasing, the entrepreneurial investment arm of SES. The teleport is expected to enter into service in 2017. It will be a state-of-the-art facility providing satellite telemetry, tracking and commanding (TT&C) facilities and capacity management, together with a wide range of teleport services such as uplink, downlink, and contribution services for broadcasters and data centres.

=== Telephones ===
The main telephone provider in the Isle of Man today is Manx Telecom.

In 1889 George Gillmore, formerly an electrician for the GPO's Manx telegraph operations, was granted a licence by the Postmaster General to operate the Isle of Man's first telephone service. Based in an exchange in Athol Street, early customers of Gilbert's telephone service included the Isle of Man Steam Packet Company and the Isle of Man Railway. Not having the resources to fund expansion or a link to England, Gillmore sold his licence to the National Telephone Company and stayed on as their manager on the island.

By 1901 there were 600 subscribers, and the telephone system had been extended to Ramsey, Castletown, Peel, Port Erin, Port St. Mary and Onchan.

On 1 January 1912 the National Telephone Company was nationalised and merged into the General Post Office by the Telephone Transfer Act 1911 (1 & 2 Geo. 5. c. 26). Only Guernsey, Portsmouth and Hull remained outside of the GPO.

In 1922, the General Post Office offered to sell the island's telephone service to the Manx government, but the offer was not taken up. A similar arrangement in Jersey for that island's telephone service was concluded in 1923.

The first off-island telephone link was established in 1929, with the laying of a cable by the CS Faraday between Port Erin and Ballyhornan in Northern Ireland, a distance of 57 km, and then between Port Grenaugh and Blackpool, primarily to provide a link to Northern Ireland. The cable was completed on 6 June 1929 and the first call between the Isle of Man and the outside world was made on 28 June 1929 by Lieutenant Governor Sir Claude Hill in Douglas to the Postmaster General in Liverpool. The cable initially carried only two trunk circuits.

In 1942, a pioneering VHF frequency-modulated radio-link was established between Creg-na-Baa and the UK to provide an alternative to the sub-sea cable. This has since been discontinued.

This was augmented on 24 June 1943 by a 74-kilometre (46 mi) long cable between Cemaes Bay in Anglesey and Port Erin, which had the world's first submerged repeater, laid by HMCS Iris. The repeater doubled the possible number of circuits on the cable, and although it failed after only five months, its replacement worked for seven years.

In 1962 a further undersea cable was laid by HMTS Ariel between Colwyn Bay and the Island.

Historically, the telephone system in the Isle of Man had been run as a monopoly by the British General Post Office, and later British Telecommunications, and operated as part of the Liverpool telephone district.

By 1985 the privatised British Telecom had inherited the telephone operations of the GPO, including those in the Isle of Man. At this time the Manx Government announced that it would award a 20-year licence to operate the telephone system in a tender process. As part of this process, in 1986 British Telecom created a Manx-registered subsidiary company, Manx Telecom, to bid for the tender. It was believed that a local identity and management would be more politically acceptable in the tendering process as they competed with Cable & Wireless to win the licence. Manx Telecom won the tender, and commenced operations under the new identity from 1 January 1987.

On 28 March 1988 an 8,000 telephone circuit fibre optic cable, the longest unregenerated system in Europe, was inaugurated. It links Port Grenaugh to Silecroft in Cumbria, and was laid in September 1987. The cable was buried in the seabed along its entire length.

A further fibre optic cable, known as BT-MT1 was laid in October 1990 between Millom in Cumbria and Douglas, a distance of 43 nautical miles (80 km). Jointly operated by BT and Manx Telecom, it provides six channels each with a bandwidth of 140 Mbit/s. This cable remains in use today.

In July 1992, Mercury Communications laid the LANIS fibre-optic cables. LANIS-1 runs for 61 nautical miles (113 km) between Port Grenaugh and Blackpool, and LANIS-2 runs for 36 nautical miles (67 km) between the Isle of Man and Northern Ireland. They have six channels each with a bandwidth of 565 Mbit/s. The LANIS cables are now operated by Cable & Wireless. The LANIS-1 cable was damaged 600 m off Port Grenaugh on 27 November 2006, causing loss of the link and resulting in temporary Internet access issues for some Manx customers whilst it was awaiting repair.

On 17 November 2001 Manx Telecom became part of mmO_{2} following the demerger of BT Wireless's operations from BT Group, and the company was owned by Telefónica. On 4 June 2010 Manx Telecom was sold by Telefónica to UK private equity investor HgCapital (who were buying the majority stake), alongside telecoms management company CPS Partners

In December 2007, the Manx Electricity Authority and its telecoms subsidiary, e-llan Communications, commissioned the lighting of a new undersea fibre-optic link. It was laid in 1999 between Blackpool and Douglas as part of the Isle of Man to England Interconnector which connects the Manx electricity system to the UK's National Grid.

According to the CIA World Factbook, in 1999 there were 51,000 fixed telephone lines in use in the Isle of Man.

The Isle of Man is included within the UK telephone numbering system, and is accessed externally via UK area codes, rather than by its own country calling code. The area codes currently in use are: +44 1624 (landlines) and +44 7425 / +44 7624 / +44 7924 (mobiles).

==== Submarine communications cables in service ====
- BT-MT1 (BT/Manx Telecom, 1990 - UK)
- BT-MT1-NI (BT/Manx Telecom, 2000 - Northern Ireland (UK))
- LANIS-1 (Cable & Wireless, 1992 - UK)
- LANIS-2 (Cable & Wireless, 1992 - Northern Ireland (UK))
- Isle of Man to England Interconnector (Manx Electricity Authority, 2007 - UK)
- Aqua Comms Isle of Man Link to Ireland and the USA
- Aqua Comms Isle of Man Link to Blackpool UK

Submarine cables in Manx waters are governed by the Submarine Cables Act 2003 (an Act of Tynwald).

==== Telecoms service providers ====
- Manx Telecom The incumbent provider offering all types of telecoms and owner of the national network.
- Sure The islands second full service provider offering all types of telecommunications from: Mobiles, Broadband, Home Phone, Private Circuits, Dedicated Internet Access, Data Centre Hosting, LAN/WAN/PABX consultancy etc.
- Wi-Manx VoIP and internet services provider since 2007. In 2014 Wi-Manx were granted a Full Telecoms Operator license.
- Netcetera Offers hosting and co-location in its Ballasalla data centre.
- BlueWave Communications A provider of ISP and 4G services to business and consumers. BlueWave Communications is a communications service provider located in Douglas in the Isle of Man who were granted their Full Telecoms Operator licence in 2018. It was founded in 2007 by Stuart Baggs and provides communications services to both businesses and consumers in the Isle of Man.

=== Mobile telephones ===
The mobile phone network operated by Manx Telecom has been used by O_{2} as an environment for developing and testing new products and services prior to wider rollout. In December 2001, the company became the first telecommunications operator in Europe to launch a live 3G network. In November 2005, the company became the first in Europe to offer its customers an HSDPA (3.5G) service.

Sure built their own mobile network on the island in 2007 and following various upgrades now deliver 2G/3G and 4G services

=== Internet ===
In 1996 the Isle of Man government obtained permission to use the .im national top level domain (TLD) and has ultimate responsibility for its use. The domain is managed on a daily basis by Domicilium (IOM) Limited, an island based Internet service provider. Broadband Internet services are available through five local providers which are Manx Telecom, Sure, Wi-Manx, Domicilium, Opti-Fi Limited and BlueWave Communications.

In 2021 it was revealed Bluewave host a Ground station for the Starlink Satellite Internet system

== Broadcasting ==
=== Radio ===
The public-service commercial radio station for the island is Manx Radio. Manx Radio is part funded by government grant, and partly by advertising. There are two other Manx-based FM radio stations, Energy FM and 3 FM.

BBC national radio stations are also relayed locally via a transmitter located to the south of Douglas, relayed from Sandale transmitting station in Cumbria, as well as a signal feed from the Holme Moss transmitting station in West Yorkshire. The Douglas transmitter also broadcasts the BBC's DAB digital radio services and Classic FM.

Manx Radio is the only local service to broadcast on AM medium wave. No UK services are relayed via local AM transmitters. No longwave stations operate from the Island, although one (MusicMann 279) was proposed. There are currently no proposals to broadcast any of the three insular FM stations on DAB.

==== Transmitters ====
- Snaefell - Manx Radio, Energy FM, 3FM
- Foxdale - Manx Radio (AM)
- Mull Hill (near Port St. Mary) - Energy FM
- Jurby - Energy FM, Manx Radio,
- Ramsey - Manx Radio, Energy FM, 3FM, (a site near Albert Tower is also used for television broadcasts the BBC DAB multiplex)
- Ballasaig (Maughold) - Energy FM
- Carnane (Douglas) - Manx Radio, Energy FM, 3FM, Radio 1, Radio 2, Radio 3, Radio 4, Classic FM, BBC DAB multiplex
- Port St Mary - 3FM, BBC DAB multiplex
- Beary Peark - Energy FM, 3FM
- Peel - Manx Radio
- Cronk ny Arrey - 3FM

=== Television ===
There is no Island-specific television service. Local transmitters retransmit UK Freeview broadcasts. The BBC region is BBC North West and the ITV region is Granada Television.

Many television services are available by satellite, such as Sky, and Freesat from the Astra 2/Eurobird 1 group, as well as services from a range of other satellites around Europe such as Astra 1 and Hot Bird.

Manx ViaSat-IOM, ManSat, Telesat-IOM companies uses the first communications satellite ViaSat-1 that launched in 2011 and positioned at the Isle of Man registered 115.1 degrees West longitude geostationary orbit point. In some areas, terrestrial television directly from the United Kingdom or Republic of Ireland can also be received.

Analogue television transmission ceased between 2008 and 2009, when limited local transmission of digital terrestrial television commenced. The UK's television licence regime extends to the island.

There is no Island-specific opt-out of the BBC regional news programme North West Tonight, in the way that the Channel Islands get their own version of Spotlight.

Television was first received in the Isle of Man from the Holme Moss transmitter which started broadcasting BBC Television (later BBC One) from 12 October 1951. Signals from Holme Moss were easily received in the Isle of Man.

ITV television has been available on parts of the east of the Isle of Man on 3 May 1956 when Granada Television (and ABC Television from 5 May 1956 to 28 July 1968) transmissions started from the Winter Hill transmitting station, and to parts of the west of the island on 31 October 1959 from the Black Mountain transmitting station in Northern Ireland which broadcasts Ulster Television. Parts of the north of the Island received Border Television since 1 September 1961, initially directly from the Caldbeck transmitting station in Cumberland (later became Cumbria from 1974). On 26 March 1965, Border Television commenced relay of their signal through a local transmitter on Richmond Hill, 542 ft (165 m) above sea level and three miles (4.8 km) from the centre of Douglas. The site allowed reliable reception of the Caldbeck signal, which is rebroadcast on a different frequency. The 200 ft (61 m) high transmission tower was re-sited from London, where it had been used for early ITV transmissions. Richmond Hill was decommissioned after the close of 405-line broadcasts, although the 200 ft tower remained in use for radio with Manx Radio transmitting on 96.9 MHz and then 97.3 MHz until 1989. Manx Radio moved their FM service to the Carnane site and the frequency changed to the current 97.2 MHz.

The television broadcasts are now transmitted from a 195 ft (59 m) high transmitter on a hill to the south of Douglas. The transmitter is operated by Arqiva and is directly fed using a fibre optic cable. There are further sub-relay transmitters across the Island. Following a realignment of ITV regional services and the digital switchover, the Douglas relay switched ITV broadcasts to Granada Television on Thursday 17 July 2009.

The Broadcasting Act 1993 (An Act of Tynwald) allows for the establishment of local television services. Only one application for a licence to run such a service was received by the Communications Commission. That application was rejected.

According to the CIA World Factbook, in 1999 there were 27,490 televisions in use in the Isle of Man.

==== Transmitters ====
- Kimmeragh (Bride)
- Beary Peark (St Johns)
- Glen Maye
- Foxdale
- Port St. Mary
- Carnane (Douglas)
- Union Mills
- Laxey
- Jurby
- Ramsey

== Post ==
Isle of Man Post issues its own stamps for use within the Island and for sending post off-Island. Only Manx stamps are valid for sending mail using the postal system. The Isle of Man adopted postcodes in 1993 using the prefix IM to fit in with the already established UK postcode system.

== See also ==
- Communications Commission
- Isle of Man Post
