= Manx Telecom =

Telecommunication company

Manx Telecom Ltd. Manx: Chellinsh Vannin
- Company type: Subsidiary
- Industry: Telecommunications
- Founded: 1 January 1987 (39 years ago)
- Headquarters: Braddan, Isle of Man
- Area served: Worldwide
- Key people: Gary Lamb (CEO); Kevin Walsh (Chairman)
- Services: Communications; Service Provider
- Revenue: ▲£81.47 million (2018)
- Operating income: ▲£11.57 million (2018)
- Number of employees: 300+
- Website: www.manxtelecom.com

Manx Telecom Ltd. (Manx: Chellinsh Vannin) is the primary provider of broadband and telecommunications on the Isle of Man. It is owned by Basalt Infrastructure Partners LLP.

== History ==
Historically, the telephone system in the Isle of Man had been run as a monopoly by the British General Post Office (GPO), and later British Telecommunications (British Telecom or BT), and operated as part of the Liverpool telephone district.

In 1985, the Isle of Man Government announced that it would award a 20-year licence to operate the telephone system in a tender process. As part of this process, in 1986 British Telecom created a Manx-registered subsidiary company, Manx Telecom, to bid for the tender. It was believed that a local identity and management would be more politically acceptable in the tendering process as they competed with Cable & Wireless to win the licence.

Manx Telecom won the tender, and commenced operations under the new identity from 1 January 1987.

On 17 November 2001, Manx Telecom became part of mmO_{2} following the demerger of BT Wireless's operations from BT Group. It was acquired by Telefónica in 2006.

On 4 June 2010, Manx Telecom was sold to UK private equity investor HgCapital (who were buying the majority stake), alongside telecoms management company CPS Partners. HG Capital indicated that the enterprise value of the deal was £158.8 million ($232.5 million).

In 2014, it floated on the AIM market.

On 9 May 2019 private equity investor Basalt Investment Partners completed their acquisition of Manx Telecom.

== Operations ==
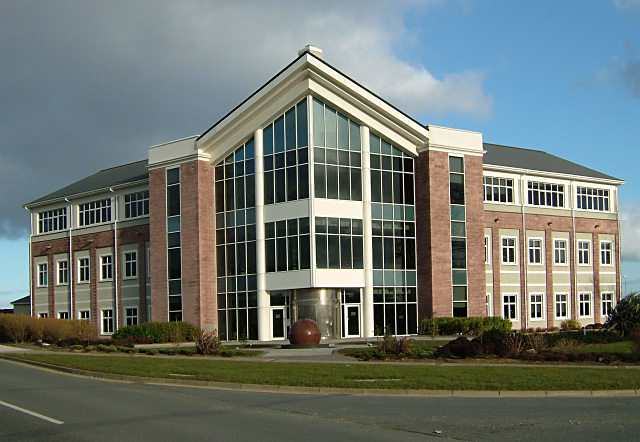
Manx Telecom headquarters in the Isle of Man Business Park, Douglas

Manx Telecom operates fixed line and mobile networks, and data centres on the Isle of Man. The Global Solutions division operates outside of the Isle of Man through mobile virtual network operator (MVNO) and international roaming agreements.

The mobile phone network operated by Manx Telecom had been used by O_{2} as an environment for developing and testing new products and services prior to wider rollout. In December 2001, the company became the first telecommunications operator in Europe to launch a live 3G network. In November 2005, the company became the first in Europe to offer its customers an HSDPA (3.5G) service.

== Principal competitors ==
- Sure
- Noventre Limited
- Domicilium
- BlueWave Communications

== See also ==
- Communications Commission
- Communications on the Isle of Man
- Manx Telecomputer Bus
