= List of the Apprentice 3 candidates =

List of the Apprentice 3 candidates may refer to:

- The Apprentice (American TV series) season 3#Candidates
- The Apprentice (British TV series) series 3#Candidates
