= APP6 =

APP6 may refer to:

- Allied Procedural Publication 6 (APP-6), NATO Joint Military Symbology
- The Apprentice (British series 6), series six of British reality television series The Apprentice
