= The Apprentice 1 =

The Apprentice 1 can refer to:

- The Apprentice (British series 1)
- The Apprentice (American season 1)
