= The Apprentice (British TV series) series 1 =

First season of UK television series

The Apprentice
- Series 1
- Promo group shot of Alan Sugar, Nick Hewer, and Margaret Mountford standing before the candidates for series 1
- Starring: Alan Sugar; Nick Hewer; Margaret Mountford
- No. of episodes: 14

Release
- Original network: BBC Two
- Original release: 16 February – 4 May 2005

Series chronology
- Next → Series 2

The first series of British reality television series The Apprentice was broadcast on BBC Two, from 16 February to 4 May 2005. After securing the rights to creating a British version of the American original, the BBC commissioned a total of twelve episodes, a standard that would be used for consecutive series. It is the only series not to feature a boardroom scene after a candidate quit the programme following a task. Alongside the twelve episodes that were produced, two specials were also created and aired – "The Story So Far" on 2 April, bringing viewers up to speed on the series; and "You're Hired!" on 7 May, airing after the series finale. The format of the latter would be later adapted for use in The Apprentice: You're Fired, beginning the following year.

Fourteen candidates took part in the first series, with Tim Campbell eventually winning. Excluding specials, the series averaged roughly around 2.5 million viewers during its broadcast.

== Series overview ==
Work on the series began in Autumn 2004, after the BBC successfully secured the rights to create a British version of the American original. Soon after, Alan Sugar signed on to spearhead the new programme. Involved in development of the format, Sugar worked with the production staff to determine the types of tasks candidates would complete. Two of Sugar's close business associates, Nick Hewer and Margaret Mountford were also announced to be joining the programme as his aides.

After the preliminary application stages, fourteen candidates were selected to participate and consisted of a balanced mix of male and female participants. As part of their first task, the candidates formed teams, with the women naming theirs First Forte, while the men named their team Impact. This series is unique for being the only series to date in the show's history not to feature an extensive boardroom scene after a candidate chose to leave the programme following a task (as seen in episode 4), and to feature a charity-based challenge with no proper reward for the winning team. In addition, the series finale only had six "fired" candidates return to provide assistance to the series' two finalists. Episodes aired on Wednesday evenings, post-watershed, as final edits of episodes often contained explicit language, especially during heated confrontations between candidates.

Of those who took part, Tim Campbell would become the eventual winner of the series, and go on to become Project Director of Amstrad's new Health and Beauty division, with his time there documented in a special episode prior to the second series, entitled "Tim in the Firing Line". In 2006, Campbell would leave the company to pursue other interests, and would go on to found the Bright Ideas Trust in 2008, offering funding and support for young people wishing to start their own business.

=== Candidates ===
Candidate	Background	Age	Result
Tim Campbell	Transport Manager	26	Winner
Saira Khan	Sales Manager	34	Runner-up
Paul Torrisi	Property Developer	34	Fired after Interviews stage
James Max	Investment Banker	34	Fired after Interviews stage
Miriam Staley	Hotel Manager	26	Fired after tenth task
Raj Dhonota	Internet Entrepreneur	30	Fired after ninth task
Ben Leary	Headhunter	29	Fired after eighth task
Sebastian Schrimpff	Financial Analyst	29	Fired after seventh task
Rachel Groves	Charity Fundraiser	32	Fired after sixth task
Matthew Palmer	Mature Student	39	Fired after fifth task
Adele Lock	Retail Manager	29	Quit after fourth task
Miranda Rose	Estate Agent	26	Fired after third task
Lindsay Bogaard	Communications Manager	35	Fired after second task
Adenike Ogundoyin	Restaurant Manager	30	Fired after first task

=== Performance chart ===
Candidate	Task Number											
Candidate	1	2	3	4	5	6	7	8	9	10	11	12
Tim	WIN	IN	LOSS	LOSE	IN	IN	IN	LOSS	IN	BR	IN	HIRED
Saira	LOSE	LOSS	IN	IN	LOSS	BR	LOSS	IN	LOSE	IN	IN	RUNNER-UP
Paul	IN	IN	IN	IN	BR	LOSE	IN	BR	WIN	BR	FIRED	
James	IN	IN	IN	WIN	IN	IN	LOSE	IN	BR	WIN	FIRED	
Miriam	LOSS	BR	LOSS	LOSS	IN	WIN	IN	BR	IN	FIRED		
Raj	IN	WIN	IN	IN	LOSS	LOSS	BR	WIN	FIRED			
Ben	IN	IN	BR	LOSS	IN	IN	WIN	FIRED				
Sebastian	IN	IN	LOSS	LOSS	WIN	IN	FIRED					
Rachel	LOSS	LOSS	IN	IN	LOSE	FIRED						
Matthew	IN	IN	WIN	IN	FIRED							
Adele	LOSS	BR	LOSE	LEFT								
Miranda	BR	LOSS	FIRED									
Lindsay	LOSS	FIRED										
Adenike	FIRED											

Key:

The candidate won this series of The Apprentice.
The candidate was the runner-up.
The candidate won as project manager on his/her team, for this task.
The candidate lost as project manager on his/her team, for this task.
The candidate was on the winning team for this task / they passed the Interviews stage.
The candidate was on the losing team for this task.
The candidate was brought to the final boardroom for this task.
The candidate was fired in this task.
The candidate lost as project manager for this task and was fired.
The candidate left the process but were deemed culpable for their team’s loss.

== Episodes ==
No. overall	No. in series	Title	Original release date	UK viewers (millions)
1	1	"Wilting Blooms"	16 February 2005	2.02
Sir Alan Sugar begins a search for an apprentice from fourteen candidates, in which the prize is a six-figure job to the winner who makes it through 12 different tasks. For their first task, the candidates, split into teams, sell flowers to potential customers to secure as best a profit they can make. The men opt for conducting door-to-door sales, focusing on a solid sales strategy throughout the task despite a slow start. The women commit to selling at a market before making sales on the move, but struggle from in-fighting and poorly-skilled salespeople. In the boardroom, the men prove themselves with their sales figures, leaving the women's team faced with discussing their performance on the task. Of the final three, Adenike Ogundoyin becomes the first person to be fired on the show, for the detrimental effect she had on her team's sales strategy.
2	2	"Child's Play"	23 February 2005	N/A
Sir Alan's next task sees the team creating a brand new toy for the 5–9 age group, with each pitching their designs to industry experts. The men focus on a safe, low-key concept involving electronic trading cards, receiving praise for the concept despite a shaky pitch strategy. The women find themselves forced to take on a risky concept involving semaphore-designed cards rather than a better alternative, but face criticism over their creation. In the boardroom, the men's concept is deemed the winner, leaving the women to face scrutiny on their performance. Of the final three, Lindsay Bogaard is fired for her poor leadership and decision-making on the task.
3	3	"Shop Till You Drop"	2 March 2005	2.17
On the next task, the teams, after naming themselves following a reshuffle, must seek out ten items on a prepared shopping list, seeking out each for the cheapest price possible. First Forte manage to secure all their items, yet face problems from a difficult leader who clashes with the other members. Impact secure all but one item due to an indecisive leader, but offset this by making a surprising bargain during their negotiations. In the boardroom, Impact prove themselves the better negotiators by spending less, leaving First Forte to come under scrutiny for their performance. Of the final three, Miranda Rose is fired for her leadership and attitude with her team mates.
4	4	"The Harrods Sales"	9 March 2005	2.35
Given a concession stand to run within Harrods, Sir Alan tasks each team to select items from the store's catalogue, before selling these to the store's customers. Impact work steadily to achieve sales despite a slow start, thanks to one member donning a costume that attracts young customers. First Forte struggle throughout the task, due to a weak team leader and problematic salespeople, despite managing to improve towards the end. The sales figures soon show that Impact's efforts were more efficient, leaving First Forte to face questions on their execution of the task. Before a final boardroom can be made, Sir Alan is surprised when Adele Lock, who is deemed the worst contributor of the team, opts to leave after being unable to cope with the pressure of the process.
5	5	"Art with a Capital F"	16 March 2005	2.18
The teams find their next task is to represent an artist, selling their artwork to visitors at an exhibition in order to secure as much commission as possible from sales. First Forte secure representation with two artists, managing to sell well despite the artwork they exhibit having a high ticket price. Impact take on representing an artist with reasonably-priced pieces, managing higher sales despite one member causing issues for the team. In the boardroom, First Forte are commended for turning a higher income than Impact. Amongst the losing team, Matthew Palmer is fired for his poor contributions, false accusations against the other team, and his confrontational personality.
6	6	"Advertising Executives"	23 March 2005	2.80
Presented with a new stereo system by Sir Alan's company, teams face the challenge of creating an advertising campaign for it, before pitching their concept to potential buyers. First Forte focus on a campaign comparing the product to classical jukeboxes, providing a presentation that is well received. Impact produce a campaign focused on the product being used to escape everyday life, but their concept is poorly devised and is not well received in their pitches In the boardroom, Sir Alan determines that First Forte's campaign was superior, leaving Impact to be questioned on the issues with their concept. Amongst the losing team, Rachel Groves is fired for demonstrating inefficient pitching skills and low contributions on the task.
7	7	"Apprentice Celebrities"	30 March 2005	2.82
Sir Alan assigns each team to run their own charity auction, convincing celebrities to donate something for a good cause. Impact secure a wide variety of donations for their auction, maintaining full control throughout the task. First Forte secure fewer donations from the celebrities they approach, with most of these receiving fewer bids, due to misinformation about the history of the items. In the boardroom, Impact win the task by securing the most money, leaving First Forte to face questions on what mistakes they made. Amongst the losing team, Sebastian Schrimpff is dismissed for his underwhelming performance and his lack of presence in tasks.
8	SP–1	"The Story So Far"	2 April 2005	N/A
In a special episode, the show looks back over the events of the seven tasks to provide a recap on what happened and who of the fourteen candidates left the process during Sir Alan's search.
9	8	"Food Fight"	6 April 2005	2.74
The next task sees each team create goods to sell at a country market. First Forte focus on making jellies, jams and chutneys, using promotions to help shift stock and make good sales. Impact focus on selling a variety of soups, but overspend on ingredients, arrive late to sell what they make, and fail to sell most of their products. In the boardroom, First Forte claim victory with their marketing strategy, leaving Impact to receive an in-depth review of their performance. Amongst the losing team, Ben Leary is fired for his poor leadership and control over the team, as well as his poor decision-making and judgment.
10	9	"Team News"	13 April 2005	2.59
The teams are tasked with selling a text messaging service for football match updates, through targeted promotion. First Forte opt for using posters and hiring promotional staff to market their service, but secure fewer subscriptions from this approach. Impact opt for making use of a Jumbotron and professional staff, increasing sales through motivating their employees with an offer of commissions for sales. In the boardroom, Impact win the task with their strategy, leaving First Forte to face scrutiny over their execution of their plan. Of the final three, Raj Dhonota is fired over his failure to step up in tasks and his dismal sales skills.
11	10	"Apprentices on TV"	20 April 2005	2.40
Sir Alan tasks the teams with fronting a telesales channel, selecting the products they think will attract the most sales from viewers. Impact struggle with selling their choice of products due to constant interruptions by the production sub-team, leaving the presenters receiving mixed advice and instructions. First Forte secure fewer products than they desired, but manage well during their broadcast thanks to a convincing sales pitch. In the boardroom, Impact face criticism over their performance after First Forte clinch the win. Amongst the losing team, Miriam Staley is fired for her poor leadership and unsuitable personality.
12	11	"Interviews"	27 April 2005	2.72
After facing ten tasks as teams, the four remaining candidates now compete as individuals in their next task – a series of tough, gruelling interviews with five of Sir Alan's most trusted associates. Each member faces scrutiny over their backgrounds, work experience and performance within the process when questioned by the interviewers. Feedback to Sir Alan, alongside observations by his aides, leads him to firing: James Max, over questions on his dedication to tasks; and Paul Torrisi, for his unclear reasons on the job offer and aggression in interviews. Of the remaining two, Saira Khan receives unanimous praise from interviewers, while Tim Campbell, despite concerns about him being naive, is commended for his business acumen.
13	12	"The Final"	4 May 2005	3.77
The two finalists, aided by a number of former candidates, are tasked with running a themed event on a riverboat, demonstrating their business skills with a budget of £5,000 to secure sales with. Saira opts for a wine-tasting event, with her team recouping their costs and making a profit towards the end. Tim opts for a fashion show, demonstrating his ability to keep costs down despite making less from the event. Reviewing the performance of both finalists, Sir Alan decides that, despite making less, Tim Campbell's overall performance and background make him worthy to become his first apprentice, leaving Saira Khan to become the runner up due to issues with her personality and her leadership in the task.
14	SP–2	"You're Hired!"	7 May 2005	3.55
In this special episode, Adrian Chiles interviews the winner of The Apprentice and the losing candidates to find out what they learned throughout their time on the show, as well as interviewing Sir Alan to gain his insight on the process and candidates.
