= The Apprentice 2 =

The Apprentice 2 can refer to:

- The Apprentice (UK Series Two)
- The Apprentice (American season 2)
