= The Apprentice 3 =

The Apprentice 3 may refer to:

- The Apprentice (UK series three), 2007 season of the British reality television series
- The Apprentice (U.S. season 3), 2005 season of the U.S. reality television series
