= Stuart Baggs =

English businessman and entrepreneur

- Born: 23 July 1988; Plymouth, Devon, England
- Died: 30 July 2015 (aged 27); Douglas, Isle of Man
- Other name: "The Brand"
- Education: Ramsey Grammar School
- Occupation: Entrepreneur
- Years active: 2007–2015

Stuart Baggs (23 July 1988 – 30 July 2015), also known by his self-styled sobriquet as Stuart Baggs "The Brand", was an English businessman and entrepreneur from Plymouth, Devon. He founded and ran BlueWave Communications, a broadband company in the Isle of Man. He gained recognition for reaching the final five of Series 6 of The Apprentice. Baggs died aged 27 in Douglas, Isle of Man due to an asthma attack.

== Business career ==
Born in Plymouth, Baggs spent most of his life in the Isle of Man and got into business by selling yo-yos at school. He attended Ramsey Grammar School. When he was 13, he founded BlueWave Communications to provide internet services in the Crown Dependency and legally incorporated it as a company when he was legally able to on his 18th birthday. It was formally launched in 2007 with Baggs saying that he founded it with the intent of providing broadband to areas of the Isle of Man with slow broadband. In 2015, on his 27th birthday and a week before his death, Baggs announced he was going to launch a new 4G data-only network.

== The Apprentice ==
Baggs successfully applied to appear on the BBC programme The Apprentice broadcast in 2010. At 21, he was the youngest ever candidate to appear on the programme. He gained a reputation for one-liners and exuberant business style. He was described by one of his fellow contestants as "a breath of fresh air" and stated they felt he was aiming to better himself. He started with strong performances before calming during a few weeks but reached the semi-finals after some strong results.

Baggs made it to the final five interview stage where he made several errors including: addressing Margaret Mountford by her first name, arguing with Claude Littner about calling himself "the Brand" and being discovered by Bordan Tkachuk to have lied on his application claiming BlueWave was fully licensed for telecommunications when it only had a broadband internet licence. In the boardroom, before being fired, Lord Sugar said that Baggs was "...full of shit" for his attitude and statements. He was also not invited back for the final. Following his appearances on The Apprentice, he was reportedly in talks to become a television presenter. He appeared on several television programmes afterwards, including The Alan Titchmarsh Show, Come Dine with Me and Pointless Celebrities.

In 2020 after his death, fans of the programme paid tribute to him and many of them regarded him as their favourite contestant.

== Death ==
On 30 July 2015, Baggs was found dead by officers of the Isle of Man Constabulary at his home in Douglas. Though initial investigations could not determine his cause of death, it was later discovered that he had died of an asthma attack. Lord Sugar paid tribute saying "Stuart was one of our most memorable characters and regretfully he's passed away, but he'll never be forgotten. What a great character". His funeral was held at St Ninian's Church, Douglas.
