= Karren Brady =

English businesswoman (born 1969)

The Right Honourable The Baroness Brady CBE
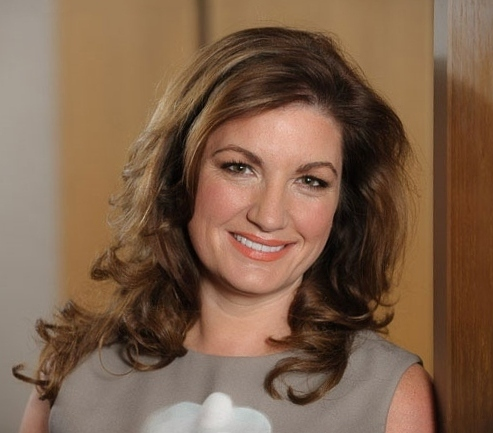
- Born: Karren Rita Brady; 4 April 1969 (age 57); Edmonton, London, England
- Occupations: Business Executive; Television Personality; Writer; Peer
- Known for: Vice-chairman of West Ham United; Aide to Alan Sugar on The Apprentice
- Political party: Conservative
- Spouse: Paul Peschisolido (m. 1995)
- Children: 2
- Awards: Commander of the Order of the British Empire; Life Peerage

Member of the House of Lords
- Lord Temporal
- Life peerage 22 September 2014
- Website: www.karrenbrady.com

Karren Rita Brady, Baroness Brady (born 4 April 1969) is an English business executive and television personality. She is a former managing director of Birmingham City F.C. and former vice-chairman of West Ham United F.C., and an aide to Alan Sugar on The Apprentice. She is a Conservative member of the House of Lords and has been a Small Business Ambassador for the UK government.

Brady's appointment with Birmingham City began in March 1993, when she was 23. In 2002, she became the first woman to hold such a post in the top flight of English football when the team was promoted. She oversaw the company's flotation in 1997, thus becoming the youngest managing director of a UK plc. She left in 2009. In January 2010, she was appointed vice-chairwoman of West Ham United following Sullivan and Gold's purchasing of the club. Brady is a regular writer for the Woman & Home magazine and The Sun. She has also published four books including two novels. Her most recent book, Strong Woman, published in March 2012 and aimed at inspiring women in business, was a Sunday Times Bestseller. On 22 September 2014, Brady was elevated to the House of Lords as a Conservative life peer, taking the title Baroness Brady. On 17 July 2017, she was appointed by Sir Philip Green to chairman of Taveta, owner of the Arcadia Group.

== Early life ==
Brady was brought up in Edmonton, London, and the family house was near the Tottenham Hotspur football ground. Her Irish father, Terry Brady, had made his fortune in printing and property development. Her mother, Rita, is Italian and she has an older brother, Darren. She attended Salcombe Preparatory School in Southgate until she was 11, followed by Poles Convent, a boarding school in Ware, Hertfordshire, and Aldenham School, Elstree, a boys' school which accepted girls in the sixth form, where she gained four A-levels.

== Career ==
=== Early career and Birmingham City ===
Brady's career began as a trainee at the advertising agency Saatchi & Saatchi having been rejected for a place on a journalism course at Harlow College. Despite the course rejection, Brady said in a 2018 interview that she made a conscious decision not to go to university, as she was keen to get out in the world and make her mark. A year later, on joining the London Broadcasting Company (LBC) as an advertising account executive, she targeted the advertising business of one of her father's largest clients, publisher David Sullivan, owner of the Daily Sport and the Sunday Sport. Sullivan spent more than £2,000,000 on advertising in six months and was so impressed with Brady that he gave her a job.

Sullivan offered her a job with Sport Newspapers, and she became one of his directors at the age of 20. While in Sullivan's employ, Brady spotted an advert in the Financial Times for the sale of Birmingham City F.C. when the club was in receivership and persuaded Sullivan to buy it and let her run it. When Sullivan commented that she would have to be twice as good as a man to do that, Brady replied "Well that's not difficult." Sullivan later commented that he agreed to the deal because such a young, female director would attract publicity to the club and also because Brady was a "sacker". Brady was 23 when she started work as managing director of Birmingham City F.C. in March 1993. She encountered sexism in the role. The first time she got on the team bus, a player said "I can see your tits from here". Brady replied "When I sell you to Crewe, you won't be able to see them from there will you?" She sold the player shortly afterwards.

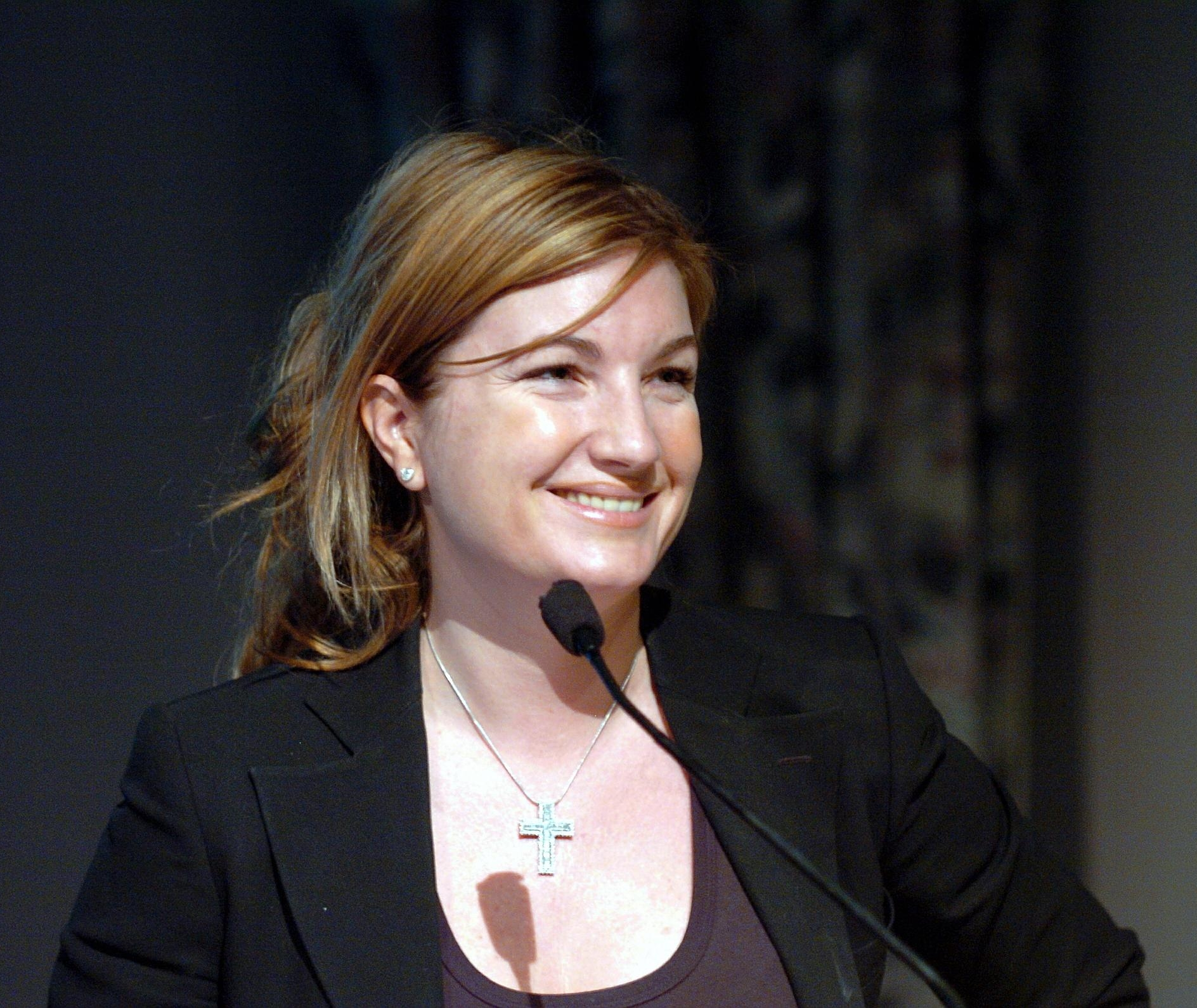
Brady in 2008

In 2008, Sullivan and Brady were arrested by City of London Police, interviewed and released on bail as part of the investigation into the 2006 allegations of corruption in English football, which also involved similar actions against players and officials from other clubs; club chairman David Gold was interviewed as a witness. The club stated that no charges had been brought and that Brady denied any wrongdoing. The investigation involved tax and national insurance offences relating to two players. Gold said that it was "utterly wrong that this highly professional businesswoman has been made a victim in a witch-hunt against football". In August 2009, it was confirmed that no further action would be taken. She left Birmingham City two months later after Sullivan and Gold sold the club to Carson Yeung for £81.5 million. The same month she was appointed as a non-executive director to the England 2018 World Cup bid advisory board.

=== West Ham United ===
In January 2010, Brady was appointed vice-chairman of West Ham United by new joint-chairmen David Sullivan and David Gold. Writing in her newspaper column Brady said "To West Ham fans I'll make a single pledge – while we are on the board, we will hang in the Tower of London before your club again goes through the financial turmoil which so nearly brought it down". Brady said she liked the idea of changing the club's name to West Ham Olympic. David Gold subsequently said that the club would always be West Ham United under his chairmanship but "What you might do is call the stadium West Ham Olympic stadium. I can make a case for that." Brady was responsible for negotiating a move on behalf of West Ham United from their Boleyn Ground to the Olympic Stadium in Stratford, east London. Initially the intention was for West Ham to take ownership of the stadium, this bid collapsing in October 2011 following a legal delay caused by a rival bid by Tottenham Hotspur. Investigators working on behalf of Tottenham were subsequently charged with fraud for obtaining illegally the private telephone records of Brady. In December 2012, West Ham were announced as the highest ranked bidder to become the anchor concessionaire and tenant of the Olympic Stadium. Of the move Brady said "We are ambitious for our great club and aim to set the benchmark for visiting away and neutral supporters from across the globe to come and enjoy the iconic Stadium and be part of our Premier League club experience".

West Ham United were named as anchor concessionaires for the Olympic Stadium on 23 March 2013. In July 2013, Brady gave evidence before a House of Lords committee, where she said the club has debts of £70m that would need to be paid before the proposed move to the Olympic Stadium in 2016. Brady oversaw the club's move from the Boleyn Ground to the Olympic Stadium in the summer of 2016. Subsequently renamed as London Stadium, the move saw West Ham United increase their capacity from 35,000 to 57,000 seats – which were completely sold out before the start of the 2016–17 campaign, giving the Club the third biggest home attendance in the Premier League. Following the move to the Olympic Stadium, some supporters who wanted to stay at Upton Park targeted verbal abuse towards Brady and other board members during crowd disturbances during West Ham's home 2–4 defeat to Watford on 10 September 2016. In October 2016, Brady received further criticism after describing West Ham's move to the London Stadium as "a chance to rebrand the club". Brady later clarified her comments, made at the Leaders Sport Business Summit, and called West Ham's move to the new stadium "part of our ambitious strategy to take our club to the very top of the world's most-popular sport."

On 21 April 2026, after sustained protests from West Ham's fanbase against her involvement in the club, West Ham announced Brady had departed the club.

=== Other business involvement ===
Brady has also been the chairman of Bauer's Kerrang! and had a seat on the board of Sport England. She was a non-executive director of Channel 4 television but resigned to take a position at Syco, the company jointly owned by Simon Cowell and Sony. In September 2010 she joined the board of Taveta Investments Ltd. with Sir Philip Green, resigning from a non-executive position with Mothercare where she had been for seven years. She is an ambassador for Barclays Life skills, which aims to offer young people workplace experience. She is also the patron of the Life After Stroke Awards and an ambassador for Well Being for Women.

=== Championing women in business ===
Brady has long been renowned for championing the cause of women in business. She has repeatedly called upon her fellow female professionals to help those trying to make their way in the business world. She explained in this Guardian column: "Any board executive can forget just how many people helped them get where they are. Those women who have got to the top need actively to ensure there is a pipeline of younger women, whether by networking or mentoring, who in turn is encouraging those below them. Women in the boardroom must not forget how many challenges and difficulties we have overcome, and we should share our coping strategies. "It is critical to create opportunities to identify talented women in business, then support them to develop their confidence to aim for the boardroom. We need to look outside the corporate mainstream, at female entrepreneurs and self-employed businesswomen, who can inject different insights and diversity to any board." Similarly, Brady famously told the Independent: "If you don't have a woman on your board you should write to your shareholders and explain why. Tell us how many women you've interviewed and what skills they've been lacking, because that will give us some basis to teach the new generation of women in business."

Brady entered into a partnership with Arden University to offer "The Karren Brady MBA". This was unsuccessful and the qualification was withdrawn after failing to attract applicants, with no graduates from the programme.

Brady was appointed Commander of the Order of the British Empire (CBE) in the 2014 New Year Honours for services to entrepreneurship and women in business.

=== The Apprentice ===
In March 2007, Brady appeared as a celebrity contestant on Comic Relief Does The Apprentice and was team leader for the girls' team, raising more than £750,000 for Comic Relief. In June 2008, Brady was a guest interviewer in series four of The Apprentice – interviewing the final five. After the show, it was revealed that Brady had fulfilled a promise she made to Lord Alan Sugar on screen by offering a job to Claire Young, who finished as runner-up in the series, after being impressed by her interview. In 2009 she interviewed candidates again in The Apprentice Season 5, as seen on BBC 1. On 30 August 2009, she was revealed as Sugar's new assistant in the sixth series of The Apprentice, replacing Margaret Mountford, who had left the series (and who returned in series 6, 7, 8 and 9 as a guest interviewer, the same role that Brady had fulfilled in her first appearance in the main UK apprentice series).

== Political career ==
Brady hinted that she would be interested in a career in politics in the future during an interview with The Daily Telegraph in March 2013. In an interview with The Daily Telegraph, Margot James, MP, said: "I think she'd be a great asset. I have a great respect for her success in business.". The feature also suggested that Brady should be made a peer to bring more women into politics and to resolve the UK's financial problems. 'But Baroness Brady would be able to make an invaluable contribution to both business and politics. David Cameron should give her a peerage without delay – and she should accept it.' On 30 September 2013, Brady addressed the Conservative Party Conference in Manchester on the subjects of small businesses and supporting George Osborne's policies as Chancellor of the Exchequer, and she was also appointed the government's Small Business Ambassador.

On 8 August 2014, it was reported that Brady would become a Conservative life peer in the House of Lords. On 22 September 2014 she was created Baroness Brady, of Knightsbridge in the City of Westminster. On 26 October 2015, Brady was involved in a controversial House of Lords vote over proposed cuts to tax credits, voting with the Government in favour of the plan.

In February 2019, the Daily Telegraph reported that she was facing questioning about her role in non-disclosure agreements (NDAs) relating to allegations of misbehaviour on the part of the businessman Philip Green.

== Personal life ==
In 1995, Brady married Canadian footballer Paul Peschisolido, who played for Birmingham City for two seasons, 1992–93 and 1993–94. In 1996, she had her first child, a girl named Sophia. She had around six weeks off work after the birth of her second child, a boy named Paolo. At 54, she became a grandmother when Sophia gave birth to a baby boy in March 2024.

Brady lives in the Knightsbridge area of London with her husband. They also have a property in the village of Knowle in the West Midlands and her husband owns a house in Canada.

In 2006, Brady underwent a full-body MRI scan as part of a medical screen, which unexpectedly discovered a potentially fatal cerebral aneurysm. Doctors told Brady at the time that she had a 30 per cent chance of dying from the condition and that it was a miracle that she had survived the births of her two children. In February 2006, she underwent urgent neurosurgery to prevent the aneurysm from rupturing. She made a full recovery and was back at work about one month later.

Despite claims that Brady is a supporter of Arsenal, she states on her official website that her footballing loyalties have only ever been with the two clubs she has represented.

== Awards ==
- In 2006 Brady was Cosmopolitan magazine's Woman of the Year and named in the category of 'Woman Who Has Changed The World'.
- In 2006 when she attended The Queen's lunch for Women Achievers and Business Leaders.
- Brady was named as the Revitalise Businesswoman of the Year 2007.
- In December 2008 she won the NatWest Spirit of Everywoman Award for services to women in business.
- In November 2010 she was listed in the business category of The Sunday Telegraph's 100 Most Powerful Women in Britain and was included in the Evening Standard's list of London's 1000 Most Influential People 2010.
- She was awarded an honorary doctorate in business from the University of Birmingham in December 2010.
- In 2011 she was awarded Britain's Most Inspirational Women by the Breakthrough for Breast Cancer Inspiration Awards.
- In 2012 she was awarded the CEO of the Year Award at the Football Business Awards.
- In February 2013 she was assessed as one of the 100 most powerful women in the United Kingdom by Woman's Hour on BBC Radio 4.
- Brady received a CBE in the 2014 New Year Honours list for her services to entrepreneurship and women in business.
- Brady was named in the Debrett's top 500 most influential and inspiration people in Britain in January 2014.
- Brady was named 10th in The Guardian's 50 most influential women in British sport, on International Women's Day, 8 March 2014.
- Brady was elevated to the Lords as Baroness Brady in August 2014.
