= Terry Brady =

Irish-born English businessman

Terry Brady is an Irish-born retired businessman and former chairman of English Football League side, Swindon Town. He is the father of The Baroness Brady, West Ham United vice-chairman and TV personality. He was born in Ireland.

== Football ==
Brady became chairman of Swindon Town in 2000. The club was in administration. During his time at Swindon he was involved in discussions to move the club from their County Ground location. Despite involvement of the council and Brady being willing to spend to facilitate the move, the club remains at the same location. Swindon's debt continued to grow during his tenure and he could not obtain the necessary approval to move grounds from the council. In light of this he quit as chairman in June 2001.

After leaving Swindon, Brady was appointed as a non executive club director of Portsmouth by his friend and chairman Milan Mandaric. In 2004, following the departure of manager, Harry Redknapp, Brady described his move to bitter local rivals Southampton as 'the biggest betrayal possible'. Mandaric attempted to recruit former Southampton manager Gordon Strachan to the job after Redknapp's departure. Strachan declined the appointment as he felt his association with Southampton would cause him problems in the role. Instead the club appointed Velimir Zajec. By 2007 following a change of ownership, Brady was asked to leave the club.

== Personal life ==
Brady is a Freeman of the City of London and a patron of the Teenage Cancer Trust.
