= The Apprentice (British TV series) series 2 =

Second season of UK television series

The Apprentice
- Series 2
- Promo group shot of Alan Sugar standing before the candidates for series 2
- Starring: Alan Sugar; Nick Hewer; Margaret Mountford
- No. of episodes: 12

Release
- Original network: BBC Two
- Original release: 22 February – 10 May 2006

Series chronology
- ← Previous; Series 1 Next → Series 3

The second series of British reality television series The Apprentice (UK) was broadcast in the UK on BBC Two, from 22 February to 10 May 2006. Following the success of the previous series, the BBC commissioned additional episodes of the programme, along with ordering the creation of a new companion discussion programme titled The Apprentice: You're Fired!, which aired on BBC Three alongside the main programme's broadcast schedule. A special titled "Tim in the Firing Line", focusing on Tim Campbell's life after winning the first series, aired on 19 February 2006 and preceded this series' premiere. Alongside the standard twelve episodes of the series, it is the only series to not feature any specials being aired during its broadcast run.

Fourteen candidates took part in the second series, with Michelle Dewberry winning the competition. Excluding the special, the series averaged around 4.43 million viewers during its broadcast. A year after it had concluded, a candidate later raised a complaint against the BBC for their portrayal in the second series, which was refuted due to contradicting evidence from the broadcaster and production staff.

== Series overview ==
Following favourable ratings and viewing figures for the first series, the BBC commissioned additional episodes of The Apprentice, with Alan Sugar, Nick Hewer and Margaret Mountford all returning in their original roles. One request made of production staff by the broadcaster was that a companion discussion show be created to air alongside it. This led to the creation of The Apprentice: You're Fired!, that would air on BBC Three and operate within a similar format to spin-off sister shows like Big Brother's Little Brother and Strictly Come Dancing: It Takes Two. The search for a host for this programme led to Adrian Chiles being offered the role, which he accepted prior to the second series' premiere.

As with the first series, fourteen candidates were selected to participate, consisting of the same even mix of genders. Filming began in Autumn that year, with the men naming their team Invicta, while the women named their team Velocity. Although candidates faced similar tasks to the first series, one notable difference was that Hewer and Mountford did not reprise their roles as interviewers alongside Paul Kemsley, Claude Littner, and Bordan Tkachuk. As with the previous series, the candidates faced a charity-based task, which this time featured a reward for that task's winners.

This series is the first in the show's history to feature the iconic sequence involving the winner departing in Sugar's personal Rolls-Royce, giving a brief interview on their success. Of those who took part, Michelle Dewberry would become the eventual winner of this series, and go on to briefly claim her prize of a coveted job at one of Sir Alan's companies; However, she left in September 2006 following a series of personal problems. Throughout its filming, Sugar voiced issues to the production staff about the programme's format: considering the number of candidates taking part and the number of episodes in the series, he was not allowed to fire more than one candidate in any task prior to the Interviews stage, despite the fact that two of the tasks featured outcomes where he felt more than one candidate deserved to be fired. Production staff eventually reviewed the format, which led to eventual changes when work began on the third series.

This is the only series of the programme in which every candidate had at least one opportunity to Project Manage a task. This occurred again on the first series of Junior Apprentice in 2010, but has never happened again on the main programme.

=== Candidates ===
Candidate	Background	Age	Result
Michelle Dewberry	Telecoms Consultant	26	Winner
Ruth Badger	Sales Manager	27	Runner-up
Ansell Henry	Sales Manager	34	Fired after Interviews stage
Paul Tulip	Headhunter	26	Fired after Interviews stage
Syed Ahmed	Entrepreneur	31	Fired after tenth task
Tuan Le	Financial Adviser	27	Fired after ninth task
Sharon McAllister	Business Lecturer	30	Fired after eighth task
Samuel Judah	Product Developer	35	Fired after seventh task
Jo Cameron	Human Resources Manager	35	Fired after sixth task
Mani Sandher	Management Consultant	39	Fired after fifth task
Alexa Tilley	Management Consultant	28	Fired after fourth task
Karen Bremner	Lawyer	34	Fired after third task
Nargis Ara	PhD Student	38	Fired after second task
Ben Stanberry	IT Consultant	33	Fired after first task

=== Performance chart ===
Candidate	Task Number											
Candidate	1	2	3	4	5	6	7	8	9	10	11	12
Michelle	IN	IN	IN	IN	IN	IN	LOSE	IN	WIN	IN	IN	HIRED
Ruth	IN	IN	IN	IN	LOSE	IN	BR	WIN	BR	BR	IN	RUNNER-UP
Ansell	IN	IN	IN	IN	IN	LOSE	IN	IN	IN	IN	FIRED	
Paul	IN	IN	IN	IN	WIN	IN	IN	IN	IN	WIN	FIRED	
Syed	BR	IN	WIN	BR	IN	IN	IN	LOSE	BR	FIRED		
Tuan	IN	IN	IN	BR	IN	IN	WIN	BR	FIRED			
Sharon	IN	IN	IN	IN	IN	WIN	IN	FIRED				
Samuel	BR	WIN	IN	IN	IN	BR	FIRED					
Jo	IN	BR	LOSE	IN	BR	FIRED						
Mani	IN	IN	IN	WIN	FIRED							
Alexa	IN	IN	BR	FIRED								
Karen	WIN	BR	FIRED									
Nargis	IN	FIRED										
Ben	FIRED											

Key:

The candidate won this series of The Apprentice.
The candidate was the runner-up.
The candidate won as project manager on his/her team, for this task.
The candidate lost as project manager on his/her team, for this task.
The candidate was on the winning team for this task / they passed the Interviews stage.
The candidate was on the losing team for this task.
The candidate was brought to the final boardroom for this task.
The candidate was fired in this task.
The candidate lost as project manager for this task and was fired.

== Episodes ==
No. overall	No. in series	Title	Original release date	UK viewers (millions)
15	1	"Fruit and Veg"	22 February 2006	3.65
Sir Alan Sugar begins a new search for an apprentice amongst fourteen new candidates. For their first task, each team of candidates must secure produce within a budge of £500, then upsell their stock for a profit. The women, naming themselves Velocity, opt for purchasing cheap, overripe fruit and vegetables, but use questionably unethical sales techniques with potential buyers. The men, naming themselves Invicta, opt for selling fruit at market, but face problems with their sales strategy and an eleventh-hour change in selling. In the boardroom, the women secure a higher profit, despite Sir Alan disapproving of their tactics, leaving the men to be questioned on their performance. Amongst the losing team, Ben Stanberry becomes the first to be fired for his poor leadership and lack of market research for the task.
16	2	"Calendar Club"	1 March 2006	3.51
For the next task, the teams are instructed to create themed calendars promoting Great Ormond Street Hospital, before pitching their designs to retailers to secure orders. Velocity opt for calendars featuring photos of kittens, but face criticism on their design choice and pitching. Invicta opt for calendars featuring pictures of children in fun costumes, facing similar issues on the design and their pitching skills. In the boardroom, Invicta win through receiving a large order, with Velocity facing questons on their concept. Amongst the losing team, Nargis Ara is fired for her behaviour, her design concept, and her poor pitching skills.
17	3	"Buying the Tyre"	8 March 2006	4.20
Sir Alan tasks the teams with securing a selection of niche items from around London, seeking out each for the cheapest price possible. Invicta manage to secure all the required items, yet do so with little planning and little negotiating on their purchases. Velocity manage to secure all but one item, but conduct poor market research and lack a proper strategy. In the boardroom, Invicta manage to keep costs low, with Velocity facing questions on their performance. Amongst the losing team, Karen Bremner is dismissed for contributing to the team's loss, alongside her unappealing background and skill set.
18	4	"A Hundred Chickens"	15 March 2006	4.11
Both teams find themselves tasked with providing takeout dishes for visitors to the Thames Festival, seeking to make a profit while managing their costs. Velocity opt for selling noodles from a Chinese-themed stall; despite arguments amongst the team, they making sales with a strong pricing strategy. Invicta focus on selling pizza, but face problems from a lack of sales strategy, an overspend on ingredients, and disorganisation and arguments. In the boardroom, Velocity win with a healthy profit, while Invicta is questioned over their efforts giving them a large net loss. Amongst the losing team, while Sir Alan expresses a desire to fire all three in the final boardroom for the team's exceptionally poor performance, Alexa Tilley is ultimately fired for her ineffective leadership, failing to control their team and costs, and for displaying no decision-making initiative.
19	5	"The Amsair Card"	22 March 2006	4.03
Sir Alan presents the teams with the task of promoting his newest business venture, the Amsair Card, by creating an advertising campaign for it, and pitching their concept to experts. Velocity opt for promoting the card's features, but face criticism for over-emphasising one aspect of the venture, along with creating an unimpressive promotional campaign. Invicta focus on demonstrates each aspect of the card; despite delays in video production, their campaign is well received. In the boardroom, Sir Alan deems Invicta the winners, leaving Velocity to be questioned on their concept. Amongst the losing team, Mani Sandher is dismissed for his lack of contributions on tasks, and for taking no responsibility for giving the team a misleading briefing that set them down the wrong path.
20	6	"Second-Hand Cars"	29 March 2006	4.45
On their next task, teams work to sell second-hand cars and extras, securing as much commission as possible from their sales. Velocity's sales strategy see them making good sales with cars, but weak sales with extras due to the assignment of team members. Invicta's sales strategy see strong sales due to good placement of sellers, despite weak leadership and promotions. In the boardroom, Invicta win with the most commission earned, leaving Velocity facing questions on their performance. Amongst the losing team, Jo Cameron is fired over her failure to sell and lack of teamworking skills with the others.
21	7	"Selling in Topshop"	5 April 2006	4.26
Sir Alan assigns the teams to each sell a new clothing line in their own retail space within Topshop, aiming to secure high sale figures. Invicta focus on lines designed around the navy and modern Oriental, managing a steady strategy and creating an appealing display. Velocity focus on lines designed around Goths and aviation, but lack a clear strategy that leaves several members flailing. In the boardroom, Invicta receive praise for their performance after producing strong sale figures, leaving Velocity to face serious criticism over their performance. Of the final three, Samuel Judah is fired for his lack of marketing skills and his overall track record in the process.
22	8	"Selling to the Trade"	12 April 2006	4.58
In their next task, each team is tasked with sourcing a selection of innovative products, before pitching their choices to retailers to secure sales. Velocity opt for a focused marketing strategy aimed at securing further contacts to sell, receiving good sales. Invicta focus on selling their choices to a major retail chain, which they were advised against; despite being successful, they receive a fine for finishing the task late. In the boardroom, Velocity win as a result of their opponent's fine, leaving Invicta facing scrutiny over their performance. Of the final three, Sharon McAllister is fired for her lack of sales and for an unsuitable personality for business. Note: A segment recorded for this episode was later cut out in the final edit.
23	9	"Property Sales"	19 April 2006	4.76
Sir Alan assigns each team to make sales with rental properties, securing commission from deals that are successfully closed. Velocity opt for a strategy of making individual sales and maintaining close communication, which works well with potential renters. Invicta face issues with their selling strategy; despite decent sales, a few team members prove weak in their performance, leaving the others to struggle with closing deals. In the boardroom, Velocity win with the most commission earned, leaving Invicta to face an in-depth review of their strategy. Amongst the losing team, Tuan Le is fired for his poor leadership and lack of enthusiasm.
24	10	"Moet & Chandon"	26 April 2006	4.68
For the next task, teams are brought aboard the Grand Princess as it travels between Istanbul and Naples, and providing a quality event that makes a good profit. Velocity opt for dance classes with a cash-prize competition for their customrs, securing good ratings and income. Invicta opt to host a variety of events across the ship on the deck, but face issues with overspending on offered gifts and a lack of organisation. In the boardroom, Velocity win with a strong profit, leaving Invicta to face scrutiny on their performance. Amongst the losing team, Syed Ahmed is fired for his bad leadership that contributed to the team's loss.
25	11	"Interviews"	3 May 2006	4.98
After facing ten tasks as teams, the four remaining candidates now compete as individuals in their next task – a series of tough, gruelling interviews with three of Sir Alan's most trusted associates. Each member faces scrutiny over their backgrounds, work experience and performance within the process. Feedback to Sir Alan, alongside observations by his aides, leads him firing Paul Tulip for his display of arrogance and immaturity in interviews, and Ansell Henry, for displaying a lack of leadership qualities. Of the remaining two, Ruth Badger demonstrates a level of intelligence most suitable for Sir Alan, while Michelle Dewberry demonstrates an admirable work ethic.
26	12	"The Final"	10 May 2006	5.95
The two finalists, aided by a number of former candidates from this year, are tasked with hosting a themed evening event at London's Tower Bridge, demonstrating their business skills. Ruth creates a murder mystery party, managing to provide good sales and handling her team well. Michelle creates a James Bond-themed casino night, but faces issues from in-fighting between returning members and lower sales figures after a firm reorganisation of her team. Reviewing the performances of both finalists, Sir Alan decides that Michelle Dewberry is worthy of being his apprentice for being a much stronger all-around candidate despite the issues she faced in the task, leaving Ruth Badger to become runner-up due to her performance in the process not standing out compared to her rival.

== Criticism ==
Mani Sandher portrayal claim

In 2007, a year after the second series had been aired, Mani Sandher filed a complaint against the BBC, criticising them for his portrayal on The Apprentice, on grounds that he been unfairly treated by the broadcaster. The BBC Trust investigated the complaint and later rejected the accusations. Their findings pointed out that Sandher was aware that the programme was subject to editing after filming, and that this had been done to an acceptable standard that was not misleading, per Ofcom's broadcasting codes. Although Sandher later attempted to appeal against the Trust's decision on his complaint, the Editorial Complaints Unit of the BBC dismissed this.

== Ratings ==
Official episode viewing figures are from BARB.

Episode no.	Airdate	Viewers (millions)	BBC Two weekly ranking
1	22 February 2006	3.65	2
2	1 March 2006	3.51	2
3	8 March 2006	4.20	1
4	15 March 2006	4.11	1
5	22 March 2006	4.03	2
6	29 March 2006	4.45	1
7	5 April 2006	4.26	1
8	12 April 2006	4.58	1
9	19 April 2006	4.76	1
10	26 April 2006	4.68	1
11	3 May 2006	4.98	1
12	10 May 2006	5.95	1

Specials

Episode	Airdate	Viewers (millions)	BBC Two weekly ranking
Tim in the Firing Line	19 February 2006	2.26	25
