= Manx Telecomputer Bus =

The Manx Telecomputer Bus was a Manx government initiative to teach IT to children from the late 1990s onwards, when access to computers was limited in schools. A converted bus was equipped with 23 Macintosh computers and acted as a mobile classroom. Operating from 1998 to 2020, the bus toured the Isle of Man to teach children about the internet and technology. The bus on occasion made trips to England also. Approximately 100,000 schoolchildren made use of the service during its lifetime.

== History ==
The project was first devised by Alex Townsend in the 1990s- then a teacher at St. Ninian's High School. He envisioned a mobile classroom in the form of a converted bus to teach children about the internet.

The 1977 Leyland National bus- previously in service on the island for public transport- was purchased by the Department of Education for £5,000 and underwent an extensive conversion over nine months, partially funded by a grant from Manx Telecom. It was described at the time as a "state-of-the-art facility to take computer education into the 21st century".

It was first put into operation on September 11, 1998 at Sulby Primary School, and from there circulated around all primary schools on the island. The original configuration featured Macintosh G3s, flat screen monitors and an interactive whiteboard. A press release from the time of the launch indicated that the flat screen monitors offered a “CRT-equivalent picture”. Students from St. Ninian's and Ballakermeen High School accompanied the bus on a visit to London in 1999, to attend the BBC Tomorrow's World Live Exhibition.

The technology on the bus evolved over time. It received 3G access in 2003, and the computers were all replaced during a 2008 relaunch. In 2015, the bus was provided with four 4G receivers by Manx Telecom.

By the late 2010s, the increased availability of computers and mobile tablets in schools rendered the service largely obsolete. A final unplugging ceremony in Sulby on March 3, 2020 marked the end of the service. The event was attended by those who had used the bus over its 22-year lifespan.

== Awards and recognition ==
The project came second in the Contribution to Civic Society category at the 2003 ‘’New Statesman’’ New Media Awards. In 2014, founder Alex Townsend was recognised on a list of pioneers and innovators by Apple, with a spokesperson describing the concept as a "stroke of brilliance".
