= The Apprentice (British TV series) series 6 =

Sixth season of UK television series

The Apprentice
- Series 6
- Promo group shot of Alan Sugar, Nick Hewer, and Karren Brady standing before the candidates for series 6
- Starring: Alan Sugar; Nick Hewer; Karren Brady
- No. of episodes: 14

Release
- Original network: BBC One
- Original release: 6 October – 19 December 2010

Series chronology
- ← Previous; Series 5 Next → Series 7

The sixth series of British reality television series The Apprentice was broadcast in the UK on BBC One, from 6 October to 19 December 2010. Due to the 2010 General Election, which Alan Sugar had political ties with following his appointment as a Lord within the House of Lords, the BBC postponed the series' broadcast until autumn of that year to preserve the broadcaster's strict political impartiality rules.

The sixth series was the last to offer a six-figure job as a prize (later becoming a £250,000 business investment). It is also the first series to feature Karren Brady in the role of Sugar's aide (having replaced Margaret Mountford), after an initial appearance in this role for the first series of Young Apprentice; Mountford retained a role within series 6 as an interviewer in the Interviews stage. Alongside the standard twelve episodes, two specials were aired alongside this series – "The Final Five" on 9 December; and "Why I Fired Them" on 16 December.

Sixteen candidates took part in the sixth series, with Stella English winning the competition. However, after describing her winning role in Lord Sugar's employ as being no more than an "overpaid lackey", significant changes were made to the prize in later series. Excluding the specials, the series averaged around 7.87 million viewers during its broadcast.

== Series overview ==
After receiving applications from all over the country, production staff held regional auditions and interviews throughout July 2009, followed by a second round of interviews and assessments in London to determine the final selection of sixteen candidates. Prior to work beginning on the series, Karren Brady replaced Margaret Mountford as one of Lord Sugar's aides. Her appointment was given a trial run during the production and broadcast of the first series of Young Apprentice, before it was finalised for the main programme. Meanwhile, Mountford agreed to appear as an interviewer in the Interviews stage.

Filming for the sixth series began in Autumn 2009, with a projected air date of March 2010. However, the announcement that a General Election would be taking place in May of that year meant that the broadcaster had to postpone the series until the start of October, due to Sugar's then-official ties with the Labour government at the time. In a statement made about the postponement of the sixth series, Sugar revealed that running it during the General Election would have been a risk to the broadcaster's political impartiality rules, due in part to his recent appointment as a Lord in the House of Lords earlier that year; this also explained the altering of his address from "Sir Alan" in previous series, to "Lord Sugar" from series 6 onwards.

The series finale saw a crossover episode between The Apprentice and its sister show, The Apprentice: You're Fired!, on BBC One. The episode was formatted with a short intro by the host of You're Fired, before leading onto the series finale of the main show, to be immediately followed by the full episode of You're Fired!; subsequent repeats of the series finale only included the main show's episode. Production staff later decided to create subsequent crossover finales of the two episodes in future series, after finding the crossover format to appeal to viewers.

The team names for the series were Synergy and Apollo. Prior to the start of filming for the second episode, Raleigh Addington was forced to drop out of the show after a member of his family was badly injured while on active duty in the British armed forces. His departure meant that Sugar had to avoid multiple firings outside of the Interviews stage. Of those who remained, Stella English would become the eventual winner, whereupon she remained in Sugar's employment until issues began to surface in May 2011, whilst working for his company Viglen. Complaining that she required a new role, as the existing one made her work like a "glorified PA" for Sugar, her contract was not renewed. After unsuccessfully suing Sugar, she would later face financial difficulties, before eventually securing work with crowdfunding TV channel Crowd Box TV.

=== Candidates ===
Candidate	Background	Age	Result
Stella English	Head of Business Management	30	Winner
Chris Bates	Investment Banker	24	Runner-up
Jamie Lester	Overseas Property Developer	28	Fired after Interviews stage
Joanna Riley	Cleaning Company Owner	25	Fired after Interviews stage
Stuart Baggs	Telecoms Entrepreneur	21	Fired after Interviews stage
Liz Locke	Investment Banker	24	Fired after tenth task
Laura Moore	Business Development Manager	22	Fired after ninth task
Christopher Farrell	Mortgage Broker	28	Fired after eighth task
Sandeesh Samra	Recruitment Consultant	26	Fired after seventh task
Alex Epstein	Unemployed Head of Communications	26	Fired after sixth task
Paloma Vivanco	Senior Marketing Manager	29	Fired after fifth task
Melissa Cohen	Food Business Manager	27	Fired after fourth task
Shibby Robati	Surgeon and Business Owner	27	Fired after third task
Joy Stefanicki	Marketing Director	31	Fired after second task
Raleigh Addington	Unemployed Graduate	22	Quit prior to the second task
Dan Harris	Sales Director	34	Fired after first task

=== Performance chart ===
Candidate	Task Number											
Candidate	1	2	3	4	5	6	7	8	9	10	11	12
Stella	IN	WIN	IN	LOSS	IN	IN	IN	WIN	BR	BR	IN	HIRED
Chris	LOSS	IN	LOSS	WIN	LOSS	BR	BR	LOSE	IN	IN	IN	RUNNER-UP
Jamie	LOSS	IN	IN	LOSE	IN	IN	LOSS	BR	WIN	IN	FIRED	
Joanna	WIN	BR	IN	LOSS	IN	IN	IN	IN	LOSS	WIN	FIRED	
Stuart	BR	IN	IN	BR	LOSS	LOSS	WIN	IN	IN	LOSE	FIRED	
Liz	IN	LOSS	LOSS	IN	WIN	IN	BR	LOSS	LOSE	FIRED		
Laura	IN	LOSE	LOSS	IN	LOSS	LOSS	IN	IN	FIRED			
Christopher	LOSS	IN	IN	LOSS	IN	WIN	LOSS	FIRED				
Sandeesh	IN	LOSS	BR	IN	BR	BR	FIRED					
Alex	BR	IN	IN	IN	BR	FIRED						
Paloma	IN	LOSS	BR	IN	FIRED							
Melissa	IN	LOSS	WIN	FIRED								
Shibby	LOSS	IN	FIRED									
Joy	IN	FIRED										
Raleigh	LOSS	LEFT										
Dan	FIRED											

Key:

The candidate won this series of The Apprentice.
The candidate was the runner-up.
The candidate won as project manager on his/her team, for this task.
The candidate lost as project manager on his/her team, for this task.
The candidate was on the winning team for this task / they passed the Interviews stage.
The candidate was on the losing team for this task.
The candidate was brought to the final boardroom for this task.
The candidate was fired in this task.
The candidate lost as project manager for this task and was fired.
The candidate left the process.

== Episodes ==
No. overall	No. in series	Title	Original release date	UK viewers (millions)
71	1	"Bangers"	6 October 2010	7.65
Lord Sugar begins the hunt for a new apprentice from a pool of sixteen candidates. Their first task sees them manufacturing sausages to sell on the streets of London. The women opt to make gourmet sausages with a high meat content, while the men opt for making cheap sausages, but receive fewer sales, while being unable to control their costs. After the men lose, Dan Harris becomes the first to be fired for demonstrating poor sales and leadership skills.
72	2	"Beach Accessory"	13 October 2010	8.10
This week's task is to create a new beach accessory, before pitching it to three retailers. Synergy opt for a towel and pillow set that can store drinks and keep them cool; while they receive some orders, their design is criticised and their pitching is poor. Apollo design a book-stand, yet receive no orders due to the project manager refusing an exclusivity deal, despite the retailers mostly approving of their concept's design. In the boardroom, Synergy win the task, while Lord Sugar berates the lack of co-operation within Apollo. From the losing team, Joy Stefanicki is fired for a lack of contributions and presence over the past two tasks, and for displaying no assertiveness. Notes: Prior to recording for this episode's task, Raleigh Addington was forced to leave the programme due to an emergency family matter. The nature of the matter was later revealed on You're Fired! following this episode's broadcast.
73	3	"Bakery"	20 October 2010	7.53
This week's task is to bake goods to sell to clients and passing trade within London. Synergy manage decent sales, despite some client dissatisfaction. Apollo also manage good sales but face major issues, including an upsell on their client's deal that results in them owing compensation for failing to deliver on the agreed quantity of products, and poor communication within the team. Synergy win the task, leaving Apollo to face scrutiny over their mistakes. Of the bottom three, Shibby Robati is dismissed for his poor leadership and communications skills, and causing the compensation incident.
74	4	"Selling to Trade"	27 October 2010	6.49
This week's task is to choose a new invention from a pre-determined selection and pitch it to retailers. Apollo choose a temperature-sensitive baby outfit and a slimming T-shirt, securing plenty of orders, despite one arrangement being later disallowed as per the task's rules. Synergy choose to pitch a gardening tool and a shower head, but face considerable issues with pitching, and ultimately achieve few sales. Apollo secure victory, leaving Synergy to be criticised for their weak performance. Of the final three, Melissa Cohen is fired over her poor pitches in the task, her attitude to the team's leader, and failing to demonstrate any sales skills.
75	5	"Fashion"	3 November 2010	8.20
Each team find themselves represent an up-and-coming designer, selling their respective choice's line of new clothing within a retail space at Trafford Centre, Manchester. Synergy represent a designer with a line of reasonably-priced clothing, managing good sales from their choice, despite delays in opening their store and creating an unattractive retail space. Apollo represent a designer with a line of high-value "recycled" clothing, yet despite making good sales and utilising a promotional opportunity to attract customers, their performance is compounded by mistakes from a problematic member. A totalling of sale figures soon reveal that Synergy's efforts were efficient, leaving Apollo to criticism on their execution of the task. Of the final three, Paloma Vivanco is fired, despite the good feedback on her performance, for displaying a hostile attitude in the boardroom, and for making aggressive accusations against the other two members and manipulating one of them into being a scapegoat.
76	6	"Advertising"	10 November 2010	7.56
Given a blank bottle of kitchen cleaner, each team is tasked to create a unique brand for it, complete with a promotional campaign, and pitch their concept to industry experts. Apollo devise a brand involving a Terminator-styled child using the product to clean up kitchens, yet while their advert and pitch are praised, the team face criticism over the inappropriate message of their brand and bottle design, along with demonstrating none of cleaner's key features. Synergy devise a brand involving a woman gaining eight arms from using the product, receiving good feedback on their campaign and bottle design, yet face criticism over the sexist nature and poor design of their advert. Feedback from the experts soon leaves Lord Sugar deeming Synergy's concept the best, leaving Apollo to be criticised over their contributions. Amongst the losing team, Alex Epstein is dismissed for his poor leadership and his refusal to acknowledge his team's campaign was entirely flawed.
77	7	"DVD"	17 November 2010	7.71
Each team is tasked with creating a unique greenscreen film experience, enticing shoppers within Westfield London to order DVDs of what they offer, while ensuring the quality is satisfactory to secure sales. Apollo focus on offering a "racing" experience and enjoy good sales, yet face issues from a difficult team leader, blunders in editing on some of their orders, and some customers not returning to acquire their purchases. Synergy focus mainly on a "driving" experience, after the initial choice fails to draw in customers, but face issues from an overspend on blank DVDs, lack of pricing strategy, and disorganisation over job allocations amongst the team. Apollo manage to achieve a significant profit when performances are reviewed in the boardroom, leaving questions to be raised over Synergy's execution of the task. Of the final three, Sandeesh Samra finds herself fired for her disorganised leadership that contributed to her team's loss, and her overall track record in the process.
78	8	"Crisps"	24 November 2010	8.07
Finding new markets abroad for British crisp-makers is the basis of the next task, as each team creates their own flavours to sell to customers within Hamburg. Apollo create two new British flavours to sell to German customers, with their creations being well-received and achieving considerable orders throughout the task, despite one order being done on the basis of a trial run. Synergy create two new German flavours to sell, yet make fewer sales due to blunders with negotiations that include selling to those not in a position to make purchases, along with making few appointments within the city, and voiding a potential order due to rescheduling an appointment for this. Apollo receive praise for their good sales figures, leaving Synergy to be questioned over the mistakes they made. Amongst the losing team, Christopher Farrell is fired for causing the voided order, alongside criticism over his lack of presence in tasks and failing to demonstrate any worthwhile skills throughout the process.
79	9	"Discount Buying"	1 December 2010	7.53
Lord Sugar gives both teams a new list of ten items he wants, tasking them to find each one at a bargain price. Synergy opt to source items while on the move, managing to secure seven items with good negotiations, despite differing techniques over their bargain hunting, their strategy almost backfiring, and nearly getting lost on the hunt for two of their purchases. Apollo opt to research where to find each item before heading out, securing all of the required items, but failed to make proper negotiations and received a fine for finishing after the task's deadline. Synergy's performance manages to ensure their total spend was kept low, leaving Apollo to face accusations of failing to seek out discounts for their purchases. Amongst the final three, Laura Moore is ejected from the process for contributing to an overspend on one of the items and for a consistently weak performance throughout tasks.
80	10	"London Tours"	8 December 2010	8.14
Tourism is the basis of the next task, as each team are tasked to create a unique tour experience for London's tourists to partake in for one day, with each receiving an open-top bus for them to use. Synergy opt for a tour with a haunted theme, securing good sales and providing a satisfactory service to customers, despite making a slight mistake on a deal with a tourist office and not securing anyone for their second tour. Apollo opt for a tour aimed at visiting sites in the city's East End, yet the good customs they receive is countered by a poor quality service that fails to provide interest on their subject matters and the team getting their tourists lost, along with failing to secure any tourists for their third tour. In the boardroom, Apollo find their sales were less than those of Synergy, leaving its members under scrutiny for their execution of the task. Amongst the losing team, Liz Locke is dismissed for her declining performance in tasks and for demonstrating nothing exceptional to Lord Sugar.
81	SP–1	"The Final Five"	9 December 2010	N/A
As this year's series of The Apprentice draws closer to its finale, this special episode takes a look at profiling the true story behind the five remaining candidates. Discussing their backgrounds, experiences, personality, and strengths and weaknesses, are a selection of each candidate's friends, family and colleagues, as well as Lord Sugar's aides, Nick Hewer and Karren Brady.
82	11	"Interviews"	15 December 2010	8.77
After facing ten tasks as teams, the five remaining candidates now compete as individuals in their next task – a series of tough, gruelling interviews with four of Lord Sugar's most trusted associates. Each member faces scrutiny over their backgrounds, work experience and performance within the process when questioned by the interviewers. Feedback to Sir Alan, alongside observations by his aides, leaves him deciding to fire Stuart Baggs for lying throughout the process and on his CV, Joanna Riley for her lack of basic business principles, and Jamie Lester for his weak CV and low appeal. Of the remaining two, Stella English is deemed a strong candidate based on positive feedback from interviewers, while Chris Bates is praised for his academic skills that deemed him a candidate with plenty to offer.
83	SP–2	"Why I Fired Them"	16 December 2010	N/A
As the final looms, Lord Sugar takes a look back to the tasks he set for this year's series of The Apprentice. From selling new sausages and lines of clothing, to the debacle over a cleaning product's branding and selling British crisp to a foreign market, he relives all of the mistakes, doomed decisions, and other notable events that occurred during the process, and provides his reasons behind each firing he made amongst the candidates for the process, which ultimately whittle them down to the two finalists for this series.
84	12	"The Final"	19 December 2010	8.63
After facing a multitude of business tasks and a tough interview, the two finalists now face one more challenge – helped by old friends, each finalist must come up with a new brand of premium alcoholic drink, complete with a marketing campaign, and pitch their concept to a group of experts. Chris opts for a new form of rum-based spirit, earning praise for its taste and its bottle's design, but faces criticism over its advertising and the drink's unappealing appearance. Stella opts for a new brand of bourbon whiskey aimed at female customers, receiving compliments for creating an appealing promotional campaign, but faces questions over the drink's strong taste. Reviewing their performances and the feedback from experts, Lord Sugar deems Stella English to be his new apprentice for 2010 for providing an attractive marketing campaign, along with demonstrating good business experience and knowledge, leaving Chris Bates to finish as runner-up due to the flaws in his drink's concept and for being the weaker of the two finalists. Notes: When this episode was first broadcast, it originally formed part of a two-hour crossover special with the programme's sister show, The Apprentice: You're Fired. After the crossover special, the episode was broadcast separately in subsequent repeats.

== Controversy ==
Behaviour of Stella English after filming

Following the sixth series conclusion, production staff became concerned with the behaviour of Stella English after she had won the contest. A few days after winning a job under Alan Sugar, English quit her post after deeming it to be "a sham" employment. Shortly after her resignation, she complained against her former employer's response to her decision and subsequently attempted to sue him for constructive dismissal. Both Sugar and the producers disapproved of the negative media attention that English brought about after her case was dismissed, and agreed during a meeting that the format of The Apprentice could not continue for the next series. As a result, the format underwent a complete revamp before production began on the seventh series.

== Ratings ==
Official episode viewing figures are from BARB.

Episode no.	Airdate	Viewers (millions)	BBC One weekly ranking
1	6 October 2010	7.65	7
2	13 October 2010	8.10	7
3	20 October 2010	7.53	8
4	27 October 2010	6.49	10
5	3 November 2010	8.20	7
6	10 November 2010	7.56	9
7	17 November 2010	7.71	7
8	24 November 2010	8.07	6
9	1 December 2010	7.53	8
10	8 December 2010	8.14	7
11	15 December 2010	8.77	9
12	19 December 2010	8.63	10
