= The Apprentice (British TV series) series 3 =

Third season of UK television series

The Apprentice
- Series 3
- Promo group shot of Alan Sugar, Nick Hewer, and Margaret Mountford standing amongst the candidates for series 3
- Starring: Alan Sugar; Nick Hewer; Margaret Mountford
- No. of episodes: 14

Release
- Original network: BBC One
- Original release: 28 March – 13 June 2007

Series chronology
- ← Previous; Series 2 Next → Series 4

The third series of British reality television series The Apprentice (UK) was broadcast in the UK on BBC One, from 28 March to 13 June 2007. Following favourable ratings of the previous two series, the BBC moved the programme from its original home on BBC Two to BBC One, with its companion discussion show The Apprentice: You're Fired! being reallocated to BBC Two from BBC Three. For this series, Alan Sugar commented that its production would include "tougher tasks and better people" as a means of making the programme stand out from other shows like Big Brother. Alongside the usual twelve episodes, the series also featured two specials – the first, titled "Beyond the Boardroom", was aired on 3 June prior to the eleventh episode; the second, titled "Why I Fired Them", was aired on 10 June prior to the broadcast of the series finale.

The series involved 16 candidates, with Simon Ambrose crowned the eventual winner. Excluding the specials, the series averaged around 5.62 million viewers during its broadcast. The third series saw Sugar face accusations of sexism from several groups, later denying these claims.

== Series overview ==
With viewing figures proving favourable since the programme's debut in 2005, the BBC decided that The Apprentice needed to be more accessible to a "mainstream" audience. In discussions between them and the production company, it was agreed that the show be relocated to BBC One, retaining its scheduling arrangements, while also requiring that its sister show, You're Fired, be moved over to BBC Two. Work on the new series included Alan Sugar conceiving of tougher tasks, and recruiting more diverse candidates. Sugar believed that by doing this it would keep the show fresh, and thus avoid it becoming just another version of existing reality programmes at the time, such as Big Brother. An example of this was having mixed gender teams from the beginning of the process, rather than first mixing them a couple of weeks in.

One of the biggest changes made by the production staff, besides the change of channel for episode broadcast, concerned the firing of candidates. With the show attracting a far greater number of applications for participation, resulting in staff conducting many more interviews, auditions and assessments, the decision was made to increase the number of candidates that formed the final line-up, while still limiting the series to twelve episodes. This change allowed Sugar to fire more than one candidate at any time before the Interviews stage. 16 applicants took part in the third series, with one team named Stealth, and the other named Eclipse. It is the first series to feature a candidate leaving the process despite having won a place in the next stage – the decision by Katie Hopkins to depart towards the end of the Interviews stage garnered considerable criticism over sexual discrimination in the aftermath of the episode's broadcast.

Of those who took part, Simon Ambrose would become the eventual winner of the series, and go on to work at Sugar's property company Amsprop, overseeing development projects, before leaving Sugar's employment in 2010 to focus on setting up a restaurant business. The move to BBC One proved to be a reasonable decision, as it led to a further rise in viewing figures for the programme during its broadcast, with 6.8 million viewers watching the series finale.

=== Candidates ===
Candidate	Background	Age	Result
Simon Ambrose	Internet Entrepreneur	27	Winner
Kristina Grimes	Pharmaceutical Sales Manager	36	Runner-up
Katie Hopkins	Global Brand Consultant	31	Quit after Interviews stage
Tre Azam	Marketing and Design Consultant	27	Fired after Interviews stage
Lohit Kalburgi	Telecoms Manager	25	Fired after Interviews stage
Naomi Lay	Advertising Sales Manager	26	Fired after tenth task
Jadine Johnson	Financial adviser	27	Fired after ninth task
Ghazal Asif	Business Development Manager	23	Fired after eighth task
Adam Hosker	Car Sales Manager	27	Fired after seventh task
Paul Callaghan	Ex-British Army Lieutenant	27	Fired after sixth task
Natalie Wood	Housewife	29	Fired after fifth task
Sophie Kain	Quantum Physicist	32	Fired after fourth task
Gerri Blackwood	Transport Development Manager	33	Fired after third task
Rory Laing	Bankrupt Entrepreneur	28	Fired after second task
Iftikhar "Ifti" Chaudhri	Company Director	33	Fired after second task
Andy Jackson	Car Sales Manager	36	Fired after first task

=== Performance chart ===
Candidate	Task Number											
Candidate	1	2	3	4	5	6	7	8	9	10	11	12
Simon	IN	LOSS	IN	LOSS	LOSS	IN	WIN	IN	LOSS	LOSE	IN	HIRED
Kristina	LOSS	IN	LOSS	IN	WIN	BR	LOSS	LOSS	IN	WIN	IN	RUNNER-UP
Katie	LOSS	WIN	IN	LOSS	LOSS	LOSS	BR	BR	WIN	IN	LEFT	
Tre	IN	BR	WIN	IN	IN	IN	IN	IN	LOSE	BR	FIRED	
Lohit	IN	LOSS	IN	LOSS	BR	WIN	IN	IN	BR	IN	FIRED	
Naomi	LOSS	IN	LOSE	IN	IN	IN	IN	BR	IN	FIRED		
Jadine	WIN	LOSS	BR	IN	IN	IN	IN	WIN	FIRED			
Ghazal	LOSS	IN	LOSS	WIN	IN	LOSS	BR	FIRED				
Adam	IN	LOSS	IN	LOSE	BR	BR	FIRED					
Paul	IN	LOSS	IN	IN	IN	FIRED						
Natalie	LOSS	IN	LOSS	BR	FIRED							
Sophie	BR	IN	LOSS	FIRED								
Gerri	BR	IN	FIRED									
Rory	IN	FIRED										
Ifti	IN	FIRED										
Andy	FIRED											

Key:

The candidate won this series of The Apprentice.
The candidate was the runner-up.
The candidate won as project manager on his/her team, for this task.
The candidate lost as project manager on his/her team, for this task.
The candidate was on the winning team for this task / they passed the Interviews stage.
The candidate was on the losing team for this task.
The candidate was brought to the final boardroom for this task.
The candidate was fired in this task.
The candidate lost as project manager for this task and was fired.
The candidate left the process.

== Episodes ==
No. overall	No. in series	Title	Original release date	UK viewers (millions)
27	1	"Coffee to Go"	28 March 2007	4.50
Sir Alan begins a new search for an apprentice from a pool of 16 candidates. For their first task, upon picking names for their teams, he instructs them to supply coffee drinks around Islington, managing costs to turn a profit. Eclipse opt for a sale strategy of selling with both a mobile van and a fixed stand; despite issues with the stock they purchse, they manage to sell well. Stealth focus on a similar strategy, but are hampered by poor market location, overspending, and purchasing unnecessary products. In the boardroom, Eclipse win the task with a higher profit, leaving Stealth to be questioned over their mistakes. Of the final three, Andy Jackson becomes the first to be fired over his poor leadership skills.
28	2	"Doggy Designs"	4 April 2007	4.98
For their next task, teams create their own bespoke dog accessories, pitching their concept to retailers to secure orders. Eclipse opt for a creating a utility belt to be worn by dogs; despite securing orders, the team face problems caused by their chosen project manager. Stealth opt for creating a dog wardrobe to store dog clothing; despite concerns, the team gamble on securing orders from the largest of the retailers they pitch to. In the boardroom, Stealth win the task with their gamble, while Eclipse face criticism over their concept. In the final boardroom, Ifti Chaudhri is fired at his own request after admitting missing his family too much to continue, before Lord Sugar also fires Rory Laing for his poor leadership and behaviour.
29	3	"Start-up Service"	11 April 2007	5.31
Sir Alan gives each team a budget of £200, with which to make a profit by running two different services, one for the day, the other for the evening. Eclipse opt for a gardening service during the day and a pub-singing service in the evening; despite aggressive leadership, the team manage positive feedback from customers and good sales. Stealth focus on a children's face-painting service during the day and a kiss-o-gram service in the evening, but struggle with problems from poor marketing locations and criticism over their evening service. In the boardroom, Eclipse secure a strong profit, leaving Stealth to face questions over their decisions and mistakes. Of the final three, Gerri Blackwood is fired for her overall performance and weak contributions in tasks.
30	4	"Sugar Rush"	18 April 2007	5.68
Teams find their next task is create their own sweets before selling them to visitors at London Zoo, ensuring they turn a profit with their creations. Stealth create a range of chocolate lollies and fudge; despite a manufacturing issue giving them less stock to sell, the team manage to sell what they produce for a higher price than planned. Eclipse create a range of different flavoured lollies, yet face problems from mislabelling with one group of lollies, along with panick selling at reduced prices. In the boardroom, Stealth's high prices produce a strong profit, leaving Eclipse to face criticism over their performance. Of the final three, Sophie Kain is fired for her low sales, and for her lack of business skills and passion towards business.
31	5	"Fish, Lips and Horses"	25 April 2007	5.46
Sir Alan assigns each team to represent an artist, selling their photographic artwork in an East London gallery in order to secure as much commission as possible with each sale. Stealth opt for artwork themed around horses and fish; facing few issues, as they use strong tactics to sell well to customers. Eclipse opt for artwork with high price tag, but face issues from the gallery layout they focus on and their weak sales tactics. In the boardrom, Stealth secure a higher commission, leaving Eclipse to face questions over the mistakes they made. Of the final three, Natalie Wood is fired for lying about her contributions made as the project manager.
32	6	"The Sausage Saga"	2 May 2007	5.68
For their next task, teams must source British produce to sell at a French farmers market, choosing those that will generate good sales with French customers. Eclipse focus on a range consisting of tea, smoked fish, and marmalade; their selection proves popular, with their use of gifted French speakers helping to secure sales. Stealth focus on a range consisting of sausages, chutney and processed cheese, yet face issues with a lack of co-ordination on their sales and a number of poor decisions throughout the task. In the boardroom, Eclipse win with strong sale figures from their choices, leaving Stealth to face scrutiny over their performance. Of the final three, Sir Alan fires Paul Callaghan for his terrible leadership and decisions, failing to take responsibility for his mistakes, and attempting to conceal his relationship with another candidate.
33	7	"The 97 pence Victory"	9 May 2007	5.92
Sir Alan gives both teams a new shopping list of items to find around London, seeking out each for the cheapest price possible. Eclipse struggle with problems, from poor market research, to rushing deals through on items they secure with little-to-no negotiations. Stealth, despite a lack of strategy, negotiate well for the items they secure, maintaining good co-operation amongst themselves. In the boardroom, Eclipse are revealed to have spent the less after the incurring of fines, leaving Stealth to be questioned over their strategy for the task. Amongst the losing team, Adam Hosker is fired for his poor leadership and organisational skills, and for making a fatal error by choosing not to purchase an item when doing so would have allowed the team to win even with a fine for being late.
34	8	"Brand-a Trainer"	16 May 2007	6.05
Each team is challenged to create a unique brand for a new style of trainer, complete with promotional campaign, before pitching their concept to retailers. Eclipse create a "Street" theme with a charitable angle for their brand; despite minor criticism over their concept, their brand is well received. Stealth create an urban music brand; despite a good TV advert, the team face criticism over unclear messaging in their promotional material. In the boardroom, Sir Alan deems Eclipse's concept is the best, leaving Stealth to face questions over their concept's mistakes. Amongst the losing team, Ghazal Asif is fired for their poor attitude, lack of business skills, and overall performance in tasks.
35	9	"Feeling The Strain"	23 May 2007	4.99
Sir Alan assigns the teams to choose a ground-breaking product from abroad, then sell them to British customers and achieve the best sale figures from their choice. Stealth focus on products from Canada; despite delays in selling, their choices prove popular with their customers. Eclipse focus on products from Sweden; despite performing well, the team struggle with sales and finish the task late. In the boardroom, Stealth win with their sales figures, leaving Eclipse to be scrutinised over their decisions. Of the final three, Jadine Johnson is fired for lacking proper focus on tasks, along with the personal reasons she gave in her defence.
36	10	"Selling on TV"	30 May 2007	5.23
Both teams find themselves instructed to choose products that they will then sell during a primetime slot on a shopping channel, with Sir Alan watching proceedings. Stealth's range include chocolate fountains and slimming pants; despite a poor demonstration of one of their choices, the team manage to secure good sales with their choices. Eclipse's range include foldable wheelchairs and trampolines, but they face issues throughout their airtime slot from their product selection, poor communication between team members, and a badly comical product demonstration. In the boardroom, Stealth win the task with higher confirmed sales figures, leaving Eclipse to be questioned over the mistakes they made. Of the final three, Naomi Lay is fired for the team's product selection, lack of respect to superiors, and her overall track record.
37	SP–1	"Beyond the Boardroom"	3 June 2007	1.62
In this special episode, the fired candidates from this year's series look back at their experiences on the programme. Along with them, friends, family and colleagues discuss the backgrounds and personalities of each respective candidate, with Sir Alan's aides, Nick Hewer and Margaret Mountford, providing their input and opinions on those who left the process.
38	11	"Interviews"	6 June 2007	6.06
After facing ten tasks as teams, the five remaining candidates now compete as individuals in their next task – a series of tough, gruelling interviews with three of Sir Alan's most trusted associates. Each member faces scrutiny over their backgrounds, work experience and performance throughout the process. Feedback to Sir Alan, alongside observations by his aides, leads him to fire Lohit Kaliburgi, for his poor CV and background, and Tre Azam, for his argumentative and immature nature in interviews. Of the remaining three, Katie Hopkins opts to leave of her own accord after admitting that her family commitments would preclude her taking up employment with Sir Alan, leaving Simon Ambrose, who received praise for his academic knowledge, and Kristina Grimes, who was given praise by all the interviewers, to progress to the final.
39	SP–2	"Why I Fired Them"	10 June 2007	2.46
As the final looms, Sir Alan takes a look back on the year's series. From the fiasco in France, to the most neck-and-neck win in the show's history, he relives all of the mistakes, doomed decisions, and other notable events that occurred during the process, providing his reasons for each firing.
40	12	"The Final"	13 June 2007	7.09
The two finalists, aided by a number of former candidates, are tasked with creating and pitching a development concept for a plot of land Sir Alan recently purchased. Simon's proposal boasts an "organic" design for development on the site, while Kristina's proposal focuses on a design aimed at symbolising the regeneration of the site; both find their proposals are well-received. In the boardroom, despite the difficulty created by their proposals, Simon's creavity and business skills make him worthy to be the winner, leaving Kristina Grimes as runner-up for lacking risk-taking initiative and a weaker business skill set to Simon.

== Criticism ==
Sexual discrimination accusation

Towards the end of the third series, several organisations - including the Trades Union Congress, the Liberal Democrats, The Equal Opportunities Commission and the Recruitment and Employment Confederation - criticised Alan Sugar for perceived sexual discrimination. The accusations stemmed from the boardroom segment in the eleventh episode, regarding Sugar's line of questioning towards the female semi-finalists, Katie Hopkins and Kristina Grimes. While he probed them about their child-care arrangements and how they'd feel relocating their families if they were to win the competition, fellow male semi-finalist Tre Azam was not similarly questioned, with the groups accusing Sugar of being in breach of the 1976 Sex Discrimination act. However, Sugar denied the allegations of sexism, citing that Hopkins and Grimes had been asked about child-care because both had disclosed in their applications for the programme that each was a single mother at the time and that Tre Azam was not asked the same question because he had made clear in his application that, while he was a father, he was also married. In addition, Sugar argued further that Hopkins' decision to decline an offer to proceed into the final had been purely her own decision, and not influenced by anyone else or her status as a single mother.

== Ratings ==
Official episode viewing figures are from BARB.

Episode no.	Airdate	Viewers (millions)	BBC One weekly ranking
1	28 March 2007	4.50	19
2	4 April 2007	4.98	16
3	11 April 2007	5.31	17
4	18 April 2007	5.68	10
5	25 April 2007	5.46	14
6	2 May 2007	5.68	11
7	9 May 2007	5.92	9
8	16 May 2007	6.05	11
9	23 May 2007	4.99	18
10	30 May 2007	5.23	12
11	6 June 2007	6.60	8
12	13 June 2007	7.09	5

Specials

Episode	Airdate	Viewers (millions)	BBC Two weekly ranking
Beyond the Boardroom	3 June 2007	1.62	22
Why I Fired Them	10 June 2007	2.46	8
