= Simon Ambrose =

Winner of the third series of the British version of The Apprentice

- Born: London, United Kingdom
- Occupations: Chartered Surveyor; Internet entrepreneur
- Website: www.simonambrose.com

Simon Ambrose is a British businessman and the 2007 winner of the British version of reality TV show The Apprentice. In 2007 Simon became the first Apprentice winner to also be a TV Actor.

== Early life ==
Ambrose enjoyed a very affluent childhood, attending Westminster School, and was a member of Rigaud's house, before graduating from Magdalene College, Cambridge, with a BA in Economics. He worked for investment bank Credit Suisse in London and then ran his own Internet shopping business before applying for The Apprentice. He is a member of Mensa having received an IQ score of 174 (SD 24) at 13 years old. He is the son of businessman Russell Ambrose, who founded and still owns Optimax, a chain of laser eye surgery clinics in the UK. His grandfather also enjoyed entrepreneurial success as a jeweller. The success of both spurred Simon to succeed in the business environment.

== Career ==
=== The Apprentice ===
Ambrose was hired by Alan Sugar in the final episode of series three of The Apprentice, which aired on BBC One on 13 June 2007, after he defeated fellow finalist Kristina Grimes. Ambrose was project manager of his team twice in the show, in weeks 7 and 10, and was on the winning team 5 out of the 10 tasks and also on the losing team 5 out of the 10 tasks, and passed the interview stage putting him to the final. Ambrose's and Grimes's task in the finale was to design money-making buildings to be sited on the South Bank of the River Thames in London.

=== Working for Amsprop ===
After his Apprentice victory, Ambrose was assigned a role at Sugar's property company Amsprop. He was also training as a surveyor. He was to be in charge of developing a hotel and golf course near Stansted Airport, and it was reported that he and Lord Sugar were planning on building London's most expensive office and might bid for a prime site on London's St. James's Square.

As of March 2008, Ambrose had reportedly "been working diligently on a property website that allows buyers to speed up legal obstacles". As of March 2009, he had reportedly relaunched www.amsprop.com – "a one-stop shop giving customers instant access to all of AMSPROP's portfolio". However, in April 2010 he was reported to be leaving to start his own venture.

=== Post Amsprop ===
In December 2015, he was reported to be operating several London bars and restaurants, and serving as chairman of the London Contemporary Orchestra.

== See also ==
- The Apprentice (British TV series) series 3

Preceded by Michelle Dewberry	The Apprentice winner Series 3 (2007)	Succeeded by Lee McQueen
