= Tim Campbell (businessman) =

English businessman (born 1979)

Tim Campbell MBE
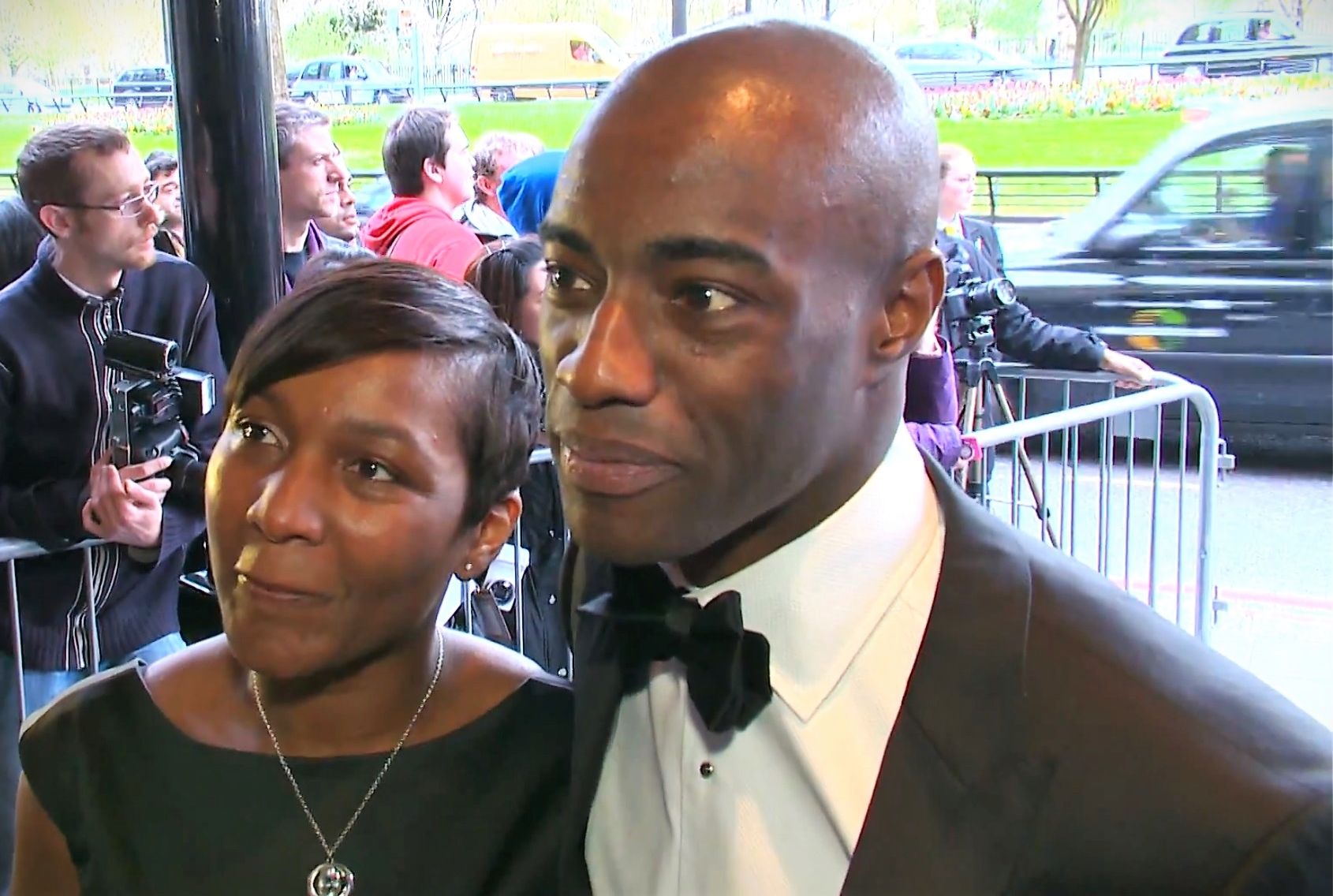
- Campbell with his wife, at The Asian Awards in 2019
- Born: Timothy Campbell; 1979 (age 46–47); Canning Town, London, UK
- Television: The Apprentice (2005, 2022–present)

Timothy Campbell MBE (born 1979) is an English businessman. He is best known as the winner of the first series of the British version of the reality television series The Apprentice, in which contestants originally competed to win a £100,000-a-year job working for businessman Alan Sugar.

== Early life and education ==
Timothy Campbell was born in Canning Town, London, in 1979. He went to St Helen's Primary School.

He graduated from Middlesex University with a BSc in psychology.

== The Apprentice ==
Campbell worked as a senior planner within the Strategy and Service Development (formally Marketing and Planning) directorate of London Underground before applying to appear on The Apprentice.

He appeared as a contestant in series 1 of The Apprentice in February 2005 and was hired by Sir Alan Sugar in the final episode, screened in May 2005, beating Saira Khan in the final. This led to a £100,000-a-year job. During the series, in weeks 1 and 4 of the competition, Campbell was project manager for his team.

An hour-long documentary about Campbell's first year in his new job, entitled The Apprentice: Tim in the Firing Line, aired on 19 February 2006, a few days before the launch of series 2.

Campbell replaced Claude Littner as Lord Sugar's aide for the 16th series of the programme due to injuries sustained by Littner as a result of a cycling accident. Campbell also stepped in during the 17th series from episode 2 through to episode 10, after Littner suffered further medical issues, and was assigned the role permanently from the 18th series onwards.

== Post-Apprentice ==
After his victory, Campbell joined Sugar's company Amstrad on a £100,000 salary. He became Project Director of Amstrad's new Health & Beauty division. In autumn 2006, Campbell held a series of one-to-one advice sessions for budding entrepreneurs organised by the British Library's Business & Intellectual Property Centre.

In January 2007, he made a guest appearance in the special edition programme Comic Relief Does The Apprentice, in order to raise money for Comic Relief. He joined the contestants after actor Rupert Everett left the show early.

Campbell was kept on at Amstrad after the end of his original 12-month contract, but in March 2007, after two years at the company, he left to set up a perfume business but this was later abandoned. Lord Sugar said Campbell had been a "great asset". Campbell met public affairs consultant Richard Morris (who later founded the Heropreneurs charity) and together they co-founded Bright Ideas Trust. The pair were later joined by Paul Humphries.

In July 2007 Campbell became a Social Enterprise Ambassador as part of a British Government initiative that aims to apply modern business solutions to social and environmental problems. The programme is led by the Social Enterprise Coalition and supported by the Office of the Third Sector, a Government department responsible for charities, co-operatives, voluntary and community groups.

It was announced in the 2012 New Years Honours List that Campbell was to be made a Member of the Most Excellent Order of the British Empire (MBE) for Services to Enterprise Culture.

Since February 2012, Campbell has been a member of Estate Office Property Consultants, a boutique London property investment and development agency, where he focuses on investments and acquisitions for High Net Worth Individuals and organisations seeking prime property opportunities.

In 2013, Campbell became chair of the governing body of St Bonaventure's Catholic School, the school that he attended as a child.

In 2016, Campbell co-founded Marketing Runners Ltd with Derin Cag, a digital marketing agency in London, whose clients include Wilfred Emmanuel-Jones.

Preceded by none	The Apprentice winner Series 1 (2005)	Succeeded by Michelle Dewberry
