= Communications and Utilities Regulatory Authority =

Isle of Man regulatory board

The Communications and Utilities Regulatory Authority (Manx: Lught-Reill Çhellinsh as Bun-Shirveishyn) is a statutory board responsible for the regulation of telecommunications and broadcasting in the Isle of Man, and since 2020, certain responsibilities in relation to the gas market.

Ofcom in the United Kingdom is responsible for the regulation of frequency allocation.

The Authority was established as the Communications Commission (Manx: Oaseirys Çhellinsh) under the Communications Commission Order 1989. Since 2001 the Minister for Home Affairs has been chairman of the Commission ex officio.

== See also ==
- Communications on the Isle of Man
