= Syed Ahmed (businessman) =

British businessman of Bengali descent (born 1975)

- সৈয়দ আহমেদ
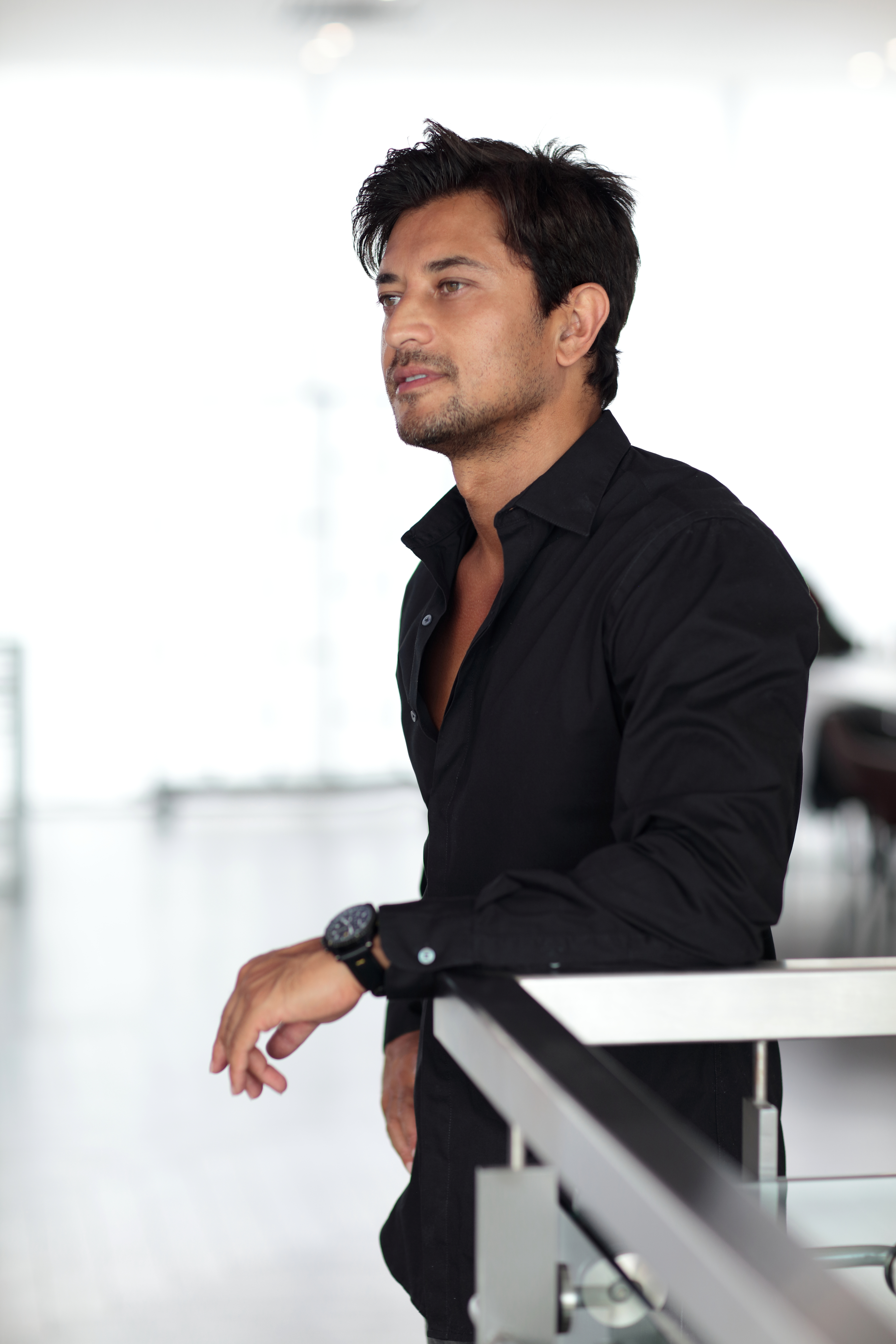
- Ahmed in 2019
- Born: 1975 (age 50–51); Sylhet, Bangladesh
- Education: Hammersmith and Fulham College
- Known for: The Apprentice
- Website: syed-ahmed.com

Syed Ahmed (born 1975), is a British businessman of Bengali descent. He is the founder and CEO of Savortex, a British technology company. He participated in the 2006 edition of The Apprentice, a UK television series, finishing in fifth place.

== Early life ==
Ahmed, born in 1975 in Sylhet, Bangladesh, relocated to the United Kingdom with his parents when he was nine months old. His father was a tailor. Ahmed grew up in Bethnal Green in the East End of London with five sisters born in the UK. He studied business at Hammersmith and Fulham College.

== The Apprentice ==
Ahmed appeared as a candidate in series two of The Apprentice, a British reality television show hosted by Alan Sugar. The series was broadcast from February to May 2006.

== Charity work ==
Syed is an ambassador for international charity WaterAid which supports projects all over the world and Bangladesh.

== Awards and nominations ==
In January 2015, he was nominated and won the Entrepreneur of the Year award at the British Muslim Awards.

== See also ==
- British Bangladeshi
- Business of British Bangladeshis
- List of British Bangladeshis
