= Margaret Mountford =

British lawyer, businesswoman and television personality (born 1951)

- Born: Margaret Swale; 24 November 1951 (age 74); Holywood, County Down, Northern Ireland
- Education: Girton College, Cambridge; University College, London
- Occupations: Lawyer; Businesswoman; Television personality
- Employer(s): Amstrad plc Georgica plc
- Known for: The Apprentice (2005–09)
- Partner: Gary O'Neil (1993–95, 1997–present)

Margaret Rose Mountford (née Swale, born 24 November 1951) is a British lawyer, businesswoman, academic and television personality from Holywood, County Down, Northern Ireland, best known for her role in the BBC reality television series The Apprentice.

== Biography ==
Mountford is originally from Holywood, County Down. She was educated at the voluntary grammar school, Strathearn School, in Belfast, then at Girton College, Cambridge.

Mountford spent a number of years as a lawyer with Herbert Smith, before taking on roles as non-executive director at Amstrad and Georgica. She chairs the board of governors of St Marylebone, an inner-London Church of England Comprehensive School.

After Mountford retired in 1999 she completed a degree in Ancient World Studies at University College London and then an MA degree in Classics. In April 2012, Mountford completed her PhD degree in Papyrology at University College, London, with her thesis entitled Documentary papyri from Roman And Byzantine Oxyrhynchus.

Mountford also chairs the Bright Ideas Trust which was set up by the first Apprentice winner Tim Campbell, and helps young people start their own businesses.

== Television ==
From 2005 to 2009, Mountford was one of Alan Sugar's advisers, alongside Nick Hewer, in the UK version of The Apprentice television show, a role with which she achieved increasing public popularity. Mountford also took part on the panel in The Apprentice - You're Fired on 27 May 2009 for the first time, during which she hinted that Lorraine would not make the final.

In June 2009, Mountford announced she was leaving the show at the end of series 5 in order to concentrate on her PhD and was replaced for series 6 by businesswoman Karren Brady.

She returned in the 2010 series, for the interview stage, helping Alan Sugar narrow down the candidates to the final two. Mountford returned for the Apprentice finals in 2011, 2012 and 2013, again as an interviewer.

Between April 2012 and November 2017, Mountford appeared on Channel 4's Countdown in Dictionary Corner, presented by her fellow Apprentice adviser Nick Hewer. In March 2013, Mountford presented a one-off BBC documentary programme Pompeii: The Mystery of the People Frozen in Time.

In July 2013, Mountford co-presented a two-part BBC One documentary with Hewer entitled We All Pay Your Benefits, filmed in Ipswich, the show investigated the benefit culture.

In October 2013, she presented a BBC Two Northern Ireland documentary called Groundbreakers: Ulster's Forgotten Radical, which highlighted the forgotten women's rights campaigner from the 19th century, Isabella Tod.

On 15 and 16 July 2014, Mountford co-presented a BBC One documentary with Hewer entitled Nick and Margaret: Too many Immigrants? which researched the impact of and attitudes towards immigrants in the UK and London.

Between 24 and 28 November 2014, Mountford presented a BBC One programme entitled Don't Mess with Me which displayed the challenges that the public and Councils in the UK face against littering, as well as convincing the public to pick up their rubbish and take a stand to the problem. The programme considered scientific research into the problem as well as preventative action.

In December 2015, Mountford appeared, alongside Nick Hewer, in BBC's Celebrity Antiques Road Trip.

In 2015, she appeared alongside Nick Hewer on a BBC Panorama show investigating the punctuality of trains on the British Rail network. The show involved them using the rail network, listening to passenger stories and talking to experts in the industry.

In May 2019, she presented a programme on the Classical poet Sappho on BBC Four titled "Sappho: Love & Life on Lesbos with Margaret Mountford".

== Classicist ==
Mountford is currently on the Steering Committee for the Society for the Promotion of Hellenic Studies and is the Chair of the Egypt Exploration Society.

In January 2019, Mountford gave a lecture at Haileybury titled "Papyrology – From Rubbish Bins to Riches", and in June 2019 she gave a lecture hosted by the British School at Athens and the Egypt Exploration Society titled "Papyrology: is anything new under the sun?".

== Publications ==
- 2012. Documentary papyri from Roman And Byzantine Oxyrhynchus (PhD Thesis). University College London
- 2012. "A day at the races in Byzantine Oxyrhynchus", Egyptian Archaeology 41: 5–7.
