= The Apprentice: You're Fired! =

- Also known as: You're Fired
- Genre: Reality game show
- Created by: Mark Burnett
- Presented by: Adrian Chiles; Dara Ó Briain; Jack Dee; Rhod Gilbert; Tom Allen
- Starring: Romesh Ranganathan
- Theme music composer: Dru Masters
- Opening theme: "Dance of the Knights" by Prokofiev
- Country of origin: United Kingdom
- Original language: English
- No. of series: 19
- No. of episodes: 220

Production
- Production location: Riverside Studios
- Running time: 30–60 minutes
- Production companies: Talkback Thames (2006–11); Boundless (2012–2020); Naked (2021–2025); Mark Burnett Productions (2005–2013); United Artists Media Group (2014–2017); MGM Television (2018–2025)

Original release
- Network: BBC Three
- Release: 22 February – 5 October 2006
- Network: BBC Two
- Release: 28 March 2007 – 10 April 2025
- Network: BBC One
- Release: 26 March 2008 – 17 April 2025

Related
- The Apprentice

The Apprentice: You're Fired! is a companion discussion programme, created by Mark Burnett for the BBC, and aired alongside The Apprentice since 2006. Initially shown on BBC Three before moving to BBC Two in 2007, the programme focused on interviews between the host, a panel of guests, and candidate(s) from the latest episode of the main programme that had been broadcast who were mainly fired, with discussions amongst the group often mixing general discussion, expert opinion and interviews, with highlight clips (unedited and edited) and small sketches designed for comedic effect. Over the course of its broadcast history, it has been hosted by Adrian Chiles, Dara Ó Briain, Jack Dee, Rhod Gilbert, and Tom Allen.

The programme operated on a similar format to that of companion discussion programmes Big Brother's Little Brother and Strictly Come Dancing: It Takes Two, although differed in that candidates interviewed on the programme were given gifts, while the final episode of each series, on occasion dubbed The Apprentice: You're Hired, coinciding with the final episode of The Apprentice and features interviews with the runner-up and winner, alongside Lord Sugar himself, a reunion of former candidates, and highlights from that year's competition. From 2008, the episode aired as part of two-hour crossover finale special with The Apprentice.

The series came to its conclusion on 17 April 2025 after running for 18 series. In 2026, the BBC announced a new companion show for The Apprentice, called The Apprentice: Unfinished Business, which would be presented by Angela Scanlon and operate under a different format.

== History ==
Following the decision by the BBC to commission a second series of The Apprentice, plans were made in December 2005 to create a spin-off companion show to run alongside the programme, similar in line to Big Brother's Little Brother and Strictly Come Dancing: It Takes Two, under the subtitle of You're Fired! Football and business presenter Adrian Chiles was brought in to host during its first run on BBC Three, with it airing alongside the second series of the main programme, right after the main programme on 22 February 2006. After the spin-off's first series, the BBC decided to move the companion show to BBC Two, after it had decided to move The Apprentice to BBC One in order for it to be viewed by a mainstream audience. Chiles remained as the host following the move until the end of its fourth series, when he decided to leave the BBC upon signing a deal to work on programmes for ITV. Following his departure from You're Fired!, the broadcaster unveiled comedian Dara Ó Briain as his replacement, who hosted the show from the fifth series, until leaving after the ninth series to focus upon a comedy he was planning.

After Ó Briain's departure, the production team undertook work to improve the show's set - much of this work including redesigning it to be brighter, incorporating more audience seats behind the main stage, and switching from using a large boardroom-styled table to a large desk shared between the host and the interviewed candidate, while providing chairs and small tables for the panel. In addition to this, the show announced an amendment to the host-panel format of the show; along with the news on 11 September 2015 that comedian Jack Dee would be the new host for the tenth series, it was also revealed that the show would feature only two guest panellists, with the third being filled by comedian Romesh Ranganathan, who acted as a regular, recurring panellist on each episode. Dee left after the tenth series had finished, due to work commitments he had made towards other comedies and a radio show, while Ranganathan was forced to drop out after his work schedule for the following year made it unlikely for him to appear in the next series. As a direct result the production team dropped the use of a regular panellist, returning to the original host-panel format, while also modifying the set - this included returning to the use of the original main stage layout, and removing the audience spaces that had been added in. In September 2016, the BBC unveiled comedian Rhod Gilbert, as the show's new host for the twelfth series; Gilbert left in 2019 and was replaced by Tom Allen.

In 2026, the BBC announced that You're Fired had been replaced with a new show called The Apprentice: Unfinished Business.

== Format ==
Each episode always begins with an introduction to camera by the host, upon them entering the set. The general setup of the introduction is that the host explains about the content of the upcoming programme, and often uses at least one humorous highlight taken from the recent episode of The Apprentice. Initially, the format of this segment during Adrian Chiles' tenure was to conduct the introduction within the audience before making his way to his seat on the main stage, but this was later changed early into Dara O'Briain's tenure, who simply made the introduction from the main stage; only rarely did he revert to using the previous format for introducing the show. After his departure, the format was altered for Jack Dee's short tenure on the show, in which more than one clip was used in his introduction, before the format reverted to the previous arrangement for Rhod Gilbert's tenure. The introduction in then concluded by the host, through introducing that episode's selection of panellists - while there is some variation, the panel is typically composed of a journalist, a businessperson, and a comedian, although in some episodes, one panellist consists of Lord Sugar's aides; in some episodes, a member of Lord Sugar's interviewing panel also makes an appearance on the panel as the respective businessperson. In the final episode of each series, the panel, candidate(s) and host are joined by Lord Sugar, who sits beside the host and acts in a similar manner as a panellist, though with a greater degree of attention during a candidate's interview.

After the introduction is completed, the candidate fired from that week's episode of The Apprentice (or the runner-up/winner, in the case of the series finale) is brought forth for their interview by the host and panel, following a clip of the moment they were fired (or hired); in the event of a multiple firing, each fired candidate is shown in the respective order they fired, with filming requiring that interviews be edited to fit a set time-frame within the final edit of the 30-minute long episode. Sat next to the host, the candidate takes part in an interview, where they are questioned on their performance, the issues they faced while on the programme, and other experiences they had, with questions interlaced by a mixture of clips taken from footage used in that week's episode of the main programme alongside "never before seen" footage; such footage tends to include post-edit photoshopping effects and animations to further enhance the humour of the clip (i.e. making the focus of the clip look differently per the words of others). Often during the interview, the host will usually get opinions and personal views from each member of the panel over respective areas (i.e. how an approach to a business related task might have been better handled). Alongside interviewing a candidate's performance to the point of their defeat/victory; the host, panellists and candidates also discuss over their favourite moments from the show and voice opinions about other candidates; the latter depends on the stage at which the main programme is at with its current broadcast schedule, whereas the final episode features discussing this with the respective candidates sitting in the audience, who were fired over the course of the main programme's currently aired series. One notable clip shown, with the exception of the final episode of the main programme, is an interview made with Lord Sugar, showing his views and opinions on the candidate who was fired; for early series, the opinions were about why he fired the candidate, but later series focused on him voicing how he feels the fired candidate will do in business by providing them pointers to keep in mind.

At the end of the interview, the panel is asked whether they agree with Lord Sugar's decision, before the studio audience are asked to vote on whether the candidate should have been fired, by holding up the appropriate card (a red "FIRED!" card or a green "HIRED" card); this is not used in the final episode. The evicted candidate is then shown their "best bits" — montages of video clips that reflects their time in the competition. This is usually accompanied by a popular music track, in the style of Big Brother Live Eviction, with the contestant's reaction to the clips shown in an inset. The host often presents the fired/hired candidate with a parting gift at the end of this, which is something appropriate to one of the candidate's memorable moments on the show; in the final episode, both Lord Sugar and his advisers are also shown their highlights from the main programme's broadcast. Following this, with the exception of the series finale, a preview of the next episode of the main programme is shown before the credits, often with additional material the main show didn't show in its preview.

During the programme's history, the format has included a number of elements used, some of which reoccurred in various series:

- A regular feature, entitled "The One That Got Away", was used in a variety of episodes, and focused on a clip recapping the contribution of a candidate who appeared to be a likely prospect for firing that week, but who survived into the next task
- During Gilbert's tenure, his introductions included an additional segment entitled "Apprentice News", in which he used various footage from that week's episode of The Apprentice to make a humorous story about its content
- In a couple of later series, a segment entitled "Harsh But Fair", focused on clips in which Karren Brady made a response to a candidate's argument that was humorous, usually in the form of criticising them over something in their performance
- During the 2009 and 2010 series, the programme incorporated the extended version format, found in programmes such as QI and Have I Got News for You, for late-night repeats. These were not explicitly promoted as such and did not appear on BBC iPlayer, with the concept dropped by 2011

== Transmissions ==
Series	Start date	End date	Presenter
2	22 February 2006	10 May 2006	Adrian Chiles
3	28 March 2007	13 June 2007	Adrian Chiles
4	26 March 2008	11 June 2008	Adrian Chiles
5	25 March 2009	7 June 2009	Adrian Chiles
6	6 October 2010	19 December 2010	Dara Ó Briain
7	10 May 2011	17 July 2011	Dara Ó Briain
8	21 March 2012	3 June 2012	Dara Ó Briain
9	7 May 2013	17 July 2013	Dara Ó Briain
10	14 October 2014	21 December 2014	Dara Ó Briain
11	14 October 2015	20 December 2015	Jack Dee
12	6 October 2016	18 December 2016	Rhod Gilbert
13	4 October 2017	17 December 2017	Rhod Gilbert
14	3 October 2018	16 December 2018	Rhod Gilbert
15	2 October 2019	18 December 2019	Tom Allen
16	6 January 2022	24 March 2022	Tom Allen
17	5 January 2023	23 March 2023	Tom Allen
18	1 February 2024	18 April 2024	Tom Allen
19	30 January 2025	17 April 2025	Tom Allen
