= Celebrity Big Brother (British TV series) series 13 =

Coordinates: 51°39′23″N 0°16′02″W

Celebrity Big Brother
- Series 13
- Series thirteen logo
- Presented by: Emma Willis
- No. of days: 27
- No. of housemates: 12
- Winner: Jim Davidson
- Runner-up: Dappy
- Companion shows: Big Brother's Bit on the Side
- No. of episodes: 27

Release
- Original network: Channel 5
- Original release: 3 January – 29 January 2014

Series chronology
- ← Previous; Series 12 Next → Series 14

Celebrity Big Brother 13 is the thirteenth series of the British reality television series Celebrity Big Brother. The series launched on 3 January 2014 on Channel 5 and was originally meant to end after 22 days on 24 January 2014. However, it was extended due to ratings success and instead ended after 27 days on 29 January 2014, making it the longest Channel 5 series of the show (at the time, since beaten by Celebrity Big Brother 15) and the joint-longest series, along with Celebrity Big Brother 7 in 2010. It is the sixth celebrity series and the ninth series of Big Brother overall to air on the channel. Emma Willis returned to host the series, whilst Rylan Clark returned to present spin-off show Big Brother's Bit on the Side along with Willis.

The series was won by comedian and presenter Jim Davidson, with rapper Dappy as runner-up.

Jasmine Waltz returned to the house for Celebrity Big Brother 19 as an All-Star, representing this series. She was second to be evicted.

== Format ==
Celebrity Big Brother is a game show in which a group of celebrity contestants, referred to as housemates, live in isolation from the outside world in a custom built "house", constantly under video surveillance. During their time in the House, the housemates are required to nominate two of their fellow contestants for potential eviction, and the two or more with the most votes would be nominated. This process is mandatory for all housemates, and failure to comply could result in expulsion from the House. The public then vote, with one of those celebrities evicted from the house. When the final week arrives, the viewers vote for which of the remaining celebrities should win the series, and the housemate with the most votes becomes the winner.

During their time in the House, housemates are given weekly tasks to perform. The housemates wager a portion of their weekly shopping budget on the task, and either win double their wagered fund or lose the wagered fund depending on their performance in the task. The housemates are required to work as a group to complete their tasks, with the format of the tasks varying based on the number of remaining housemates. Throughout the series, some housemates have been given secret tasks that must either be completed individually or with a small group; failure to do so can result in the housemate being nominated or punished in the House. Should the housemates run out of the food provided for them, an emergency ration was available to them. The housemates are forbidden from discussing nominations, and doing so could result in punishment. The format of the series is mainly seen as a social experiment, and requires housemates to interact with others who may have differing ideals, beliefs, and prejudices. Housemates are also required to make visits to the Diary Room during their stay in the House, where they are able to share their thoughts and feelings on their fellow housemates and the game.

== Housemates ==
Celebrity	Age on entry	Notability	Day entered	Day exited	Status
Jim Davidson	60	Comedian and TV presenter	1	27	Winner
Dappy	26	N-Dubz rapper	1	27	Runner-up
Ollie Locke	26	Reality TV star	1	27	3rd place
Luisa Zissman	26	Reality TV star	1	27	4th place
Sam Faiers	23	Reality TV star	1	27	5th place
Casey Batchelor	29	Glamour model	1	27	6th place
Lee Ryan	30	Blue singer	1	24	Evicted
Linda Nolan †	54	The Nolans singer	1	22	Evicted
Liz Jones	55	Journalist and columnist	1	20	Evicted
Lionel Blair †	85	Actor	1	15	Evicted
Jasmine Waltz	31	American media personality	1	13	Evicted
Evander Holyfield	51	Boxer	1	8	Evicted

=== Casey Batchelor ===
Casey Batchelor is a British glamour model and singer from Essex. She posed for various lads' magazines such as Nuts and Zoo. Casey is also a member of the little-known girl group Miss Millionaire. She entered the house on Day 1, being handcuffed to Lee Ryan before being released on Day 3 despite failing the tasks, resulting in her and Lee facing the first eviction together as a pair. On Day 6, both of them were fake evicted and moved into the secret Bolt Hole, where they watched their housemates for two days. They returned to the house on Day 8, during a live twist where they chose to evict Evander. During her time in the house, she developed a romance with Lee - unbeknownst to her, he was also involved with Jasmine. She finished in sixth place on the final night.

=== Dappy ===
Costadinos Contostavlos, better known by his stage name Dappy, is the lead singer of hip hop/grime trio N-Dubz with his cousin Tulisa. Dappy entered the house on Day 1 handcuffed to Liz Jones. However, as part of the Launch Night twist, they were then released from each other but automatically faced the first eviction as a pair. He finished in second place behind Jim Davidson in the final on Day 27.

=== Evander Holyfield ===
Evander Holyfield is a retired American professional boxer. He is a former Undisputed World Champion in both the cruiserweight and heavyweight divisions, earning him the nickname "The Real Deal". He also represented the U.S. in the 1983 Pan American Games and the 1984 Summer Olympics, winning silver and bronze medals respectively. He entered the house on Day 1, handcuffed to Luisa Zissman. On Day 2, Evander received a formal warning from Big Brother, after he said that gay people are not normal and can be fixed, during a conversation with Luisa. Ofcom later announced that they may launch an inquiry over Holyfield's comments. He and Luisa were released from their handcuffs on Day 3, but since they lost the immunity tasks, the two were automatically put up for the first eviction. Evander became the first housemate to be evicted from the house on Day 8, following a twist which involved Casey and Lee deciding who would be evicted out of him and Luisa.

=== Jasmine Waltz ===
Jasmine Waltz is an American model and actress from Las Vegas, Nevada, who had minor roles in films and television shows such as Femme Fatales and Secret Girlfriend. She entered the house on Day 1, being handcuffed to Sam Faiers. The two were freed from their handcuffs on Day 2. During her time in the house, she was known for her romance with Lee, and involvement in a love triangle between him and Casey. Jasmine was evicted from the house on Day 13. On Day 23, she returned as a guest for the "For Whom the Bell Tolls" task, where she confronted both Casey and Lee before leaving again shortly after. She later returned to compete in Celebrity Big Brother 19 as an "All-Star" housemate.

=== Jim Davidson ===
James Cameron "Jim" Davidson, is a British comedian, also known for presenting TV shows such as Big Break and The Generation Game. Jim was originally meant to be taking part in the eleventh series of the show, but was arrested hours before the launch by policemen working on Operation Yewtree. He was replaced by Neil "Razor" Ruddock. On Day 1, he entered the house handcuffed to Linda Nolan, before being released on Day 2. On Day 27, Jim was crowned the winner of the series.

=== Lee Ryan ===
Lee Ryan is a British singer, known as a member of the boy band Blue. He released his self-titled debut album Lee Ryan in 2006, which landed at number 6 on the UK Albums Chart and produced the singles "Army of Lovers", "Turn Your Car Around" and "When I Think of You". On Day 1, Lee entered the house, being handcuffed to Casey Batchelor. Despite failing the tasks, Lee and Casey were released from their handcuffs on Day 3. As a result, they both faced the first eviction as a pair. On Day 6, the pair were fake evicted and moved into the secret Bolt Hole where they watched their fellow housemates for two days. They returned to the house on Day 8 during a live twist, where they both chose to evict Evander. In the house, he was known for having a romance with Casey and Jasmine, prompting a love triangle. Lee was evicted on Day 24, in a live surprise eviction.

=== Linda Nolan ===
Linda Nolan was an English-Irish singer, best known for being a member of the girl group The Nolans. She was the older sister of the late Bernie Nolan and Celebrity Big Brother 10 runner-up Coleen Nolan. After leaving the group in 1983, she went on to perform in theatre productions including Prisoner Cell Block and Blood Brothers. She entered the house on Day 1, handcuffed to Jim Davidson. According to the Belfast Telegraph, she entered in an attempt to make a turn around from her personal struggles and living from the UK benefits system. Whilst in the house, Linda constantly argued with Jim. The two had years of history, when Linda's late husband Brian Hudson was caught red-handed stealing money from comic Frank Carson's dressing room in 1995. On Day 15, he was reminded by Davidson of his antics, promoting an eruption. She was evicted on Day 22.

=== Lionel Blair ===
Lionel Blair (born Henry Lionel Ogus) was a British actor, choreographer, tap dancer and television presenter, whose entertainment career has spanned for five decades. He appeared in films such as The Limping Man, The World of Suzie Wong, The Beauty Jungle, A Hard Days Night and The Plank. In addition, he was one of the team captains on the game show Give Us a Clue from 1979 until the early 1990s. On Day 1, Lionel entered the house, handcuffed alongside Ollie Locke. But after winning immunity on Day 3, the two were set free. On Day 15, he became the third person to be evicted from the house, losing out to the remaining housemates.

=== Liz Jones ===
Elizabeth "Liz" Jones is a British journalist and newspaper columnist, who was a former editor of Marie Claire magazine. Jones is a regular columnist for the Daily Mail and The Mail on Sunday. On Day 1, Liz entered the house, being handcuffed to fellow housemate Dappy. Following the launch night's twist and task, she and Dappy were later free from their handcuffs, but both were therefore automatically nominated to face the first eviction. On Day 20, she was evicted with the least amount of the public vote. Liz received a total of 20 nominations from each housemate, the second highest from Jim's 22 nominations.

=== Luisa Zissman ===
Luisa Zissman (born Louisa Christina Kalozois) is a British retail entrepreneur and reality television contestant, who was the runner-up on the ninth series of The Apprentice. She owns her own baking website, eBay electronic businesses and cupcake shop named Dixie's Cupcakery. On Day 1, Luisa entered the house, being handcuffed to Evander Holyfield. They were finally released from each other on Day 3, despite failing the tasks. As a result, they faced the first eviction as a pair. Luckily, she was saved from the vote. Whilst in the house, she came out as bisexual and revealed that she sought treatment for sex addiction. On Day 27, she was evicted from the house and finished in fourth place. After the series ended, she became a regular panelist on Big Brother's spin-off show Big Brother's Bit on the Side.

=== Ollie Locke ===
Oliver "Ollie" Locke is a British reality television star, who is a former cast member on the E4 reality series, Made in Chelsea. On Day 1, he entered the house, handcuffed to Lionel Blair. However, they were released from each other on Day 3 after passing a task and winning immunity from the first eviction.

=== Sam Faiers ===
Samantha "Sam" Faiers is an English reality television personality and glamour model, who stars in The Only Way Is Essex. On Day 1, she entered the house, handcuffed to Jasmine Waltz, before being released on Day 2. She finished in fifth place during the final on Day 27.

== Nominations table ==
	Day 3	Day 6	Day 10	Day 13	Day 17	Day 20	Day 27 Final		Nominations received
Jim	No nominations	Linda, Liz	Luisa, Liz	No nominations	Luisa, Sam	Luisa, Linda	Winner (Day 27)		22
Dappy	No nominations	Luisa, Liz	Liz, Luisa	No nominations	Liz, Linda	Luisa, Linda	Runner-up (Day 27)		3
Ollie	No nominations	Liz, Evander	Liz, Jim	No nominations	Liz, Jim	Jim, Lee	Third place (Day 27)		3
Luisa	No nominations	Dappy, Jim	Jim, Liz	No nominations	Jim, Liz	Banned	Fourth place (Day 27)		8
Sam	No nominations	Luisa, Jim	Liz, Jim	No nominations	Liz, Lee	Jim, Lee	Fifth place (Day 27)		3
Casey	No nominations	In Bolt; Hole	Liz, Jasmine	No nominations	Liz, Jim	Jim, Dappy	Sixth place (Day 27)		0
Lee	No nominations	In Bolt; Hole	Liz, Jim	No nominations	Jim, Liz	Sam, Ollie	Evicted (Day 24)		3
Linda	No nominations	Jim, Liz	Jim, Dappy	No nominations	Jim, Liz	Jim, Ollie	Evicted (Day 22)		5
Liz	No nominations	Luisa, Evander	Linda, Jasmine	No nominations	Jim, Sam	Evicted (Day 20)			20
Lionel	No nominations	Jasmine, Jim	Jasmine, Jim	No nominations	Evicted (Day 15)				0
Jasmine	No nominations	Jim, Liz	Liz, Jim	Evicted (Day 13)					5
Evander	No nominations	Jasmine, Ollie	Evicted (Day 8)						2
Notes	1	2	3	4	5	6	7		
Against public vote	Casey & Lee, Dappy & Liz, Evander & Luisa	Evander, Jasmine, Jim, Liz, Luisa	Jasmine, Jim, Liz, Luisa	Dappy, Jim, Lee, Lionel, Liz, Luisa, Ollie, Sam	Jim, Liz, Sam	Jim, Lee, Linda, Luisa, Ollie	Casey, Dappy, Jim, Lee, Luisa, Ollie, Sam		
Evicted	Casey & Lee; Most votes (out of 2) to move	Evander; Casey & Lee's choice (out of 2) to evict	Jasmine; Fewest votes (out of 3) to save	Lionel; Fewest votes (out of 6) to save	Liz; Fewest votes to save	Linda; Fewest votes (out of 3) to save	Lee; Fewest votes (out of 7)	Casey; Fewest votes (out of 6)	
Evicted	Casey & Lee; Most votes (out of 2) to move	Evander; Casey & Lee's choice (out of 2) to evict	Jasmine; Fewest votes (out of 3) to save	Lionel; Fewest votes (out of 6) to save	Liz; Fewest votes to save	Linda; Fewest votes (out of 3) to save	Sam; Fewest votes (out of 5)	Luisa; Fewest votes (out of 4)	
Evicted	Casey & Lee; Most votes (out of 2) to move	Evander; Casey & Lee's choice (out of 2) to evict	Jasmine; Fewest votes (out of 3) to save	Lionel; Fewest votes (out of 6) to save	Liz; Fewest votes to save	Linda; Fewest votes (out of 3) to save	Ollie; Fewest votes (out of 3)	Dappy; Fewest votes (out of 2)	
Evicted	Casey & Lee; Most votes (out of 2) to move	Evander; Casey & Lee's choice (out of 2) to evict	Jasmine; Fewest votes (out of 3) to save	Lionel; Fewest votes (out of 6) to save	Liz; Fewest votes to save	Linda; Fewest votes (out of 3) to save	Jim; Most votes to win		

Notes

- ^Note 1: As part of the series launch twist, the group was split into pairs and handcuffed together. As the first Housemates to enter the House, Jim & Linda were allowed to free one pair from their cuffs. They chose Dappy & Liz, but they were automatically put up for eviction as a price for their instant freedom. Over the next two days, three tasks took place, with the winner of each receiving freedom and immunity from eviction. Jim & Linda won the first task, followed by Jasmine & Sam, then Lionel & Ollie. As the only two pairs not to win one of the tasks, Casey & Lee and Evander & Luisa were nominated for eviction. On Day 6, Casey & Lee were fake evicted and moved into the Bolt Hole.
- ^Note 2: Whilst Casey and Lee were living in the Bolt Hole, they could not nominate or be nominated by their fellow Housemates, assuming them to be evicted and also unaware that Casey and Lee were able to see their nominations. During the live show on Day 8, the three Housemates with the most votes, Jim, Jasmine and Liz were saved. Before returning to the House, Casey and Lee were told that they had to choose which of the bottom two, either Evander or Luisa, to leave the House. They chose to evict Evander and save Luisa.
- ^Note 3: On Day 10, Housemates nominated face-to-face.
- ^Note 4: Shortly after Jasmine's eviction, the Housemates were told that they all face the next eviction, however Jasmine had the chance to save two Housemates. She chose to save Casey and Linda.
- ^Note 5: Although there were no changes to the nominations process, the Housemates were shown who nominated Jim, Liz and Sam.
- ^Note 6: These nominations were face-to-face. Due to Luisa's attempts to change her nominations after all Housemates had chosen, Big Brother banned her from nominating.
- ^Note 7: Following Linda's eviction the public were voting for who they wanted to win rather than to save, and the Housemate with the fewest votes was evicted in a surprise eviction on Day 24. The voting lines then reopened for the remaining Housemates until the final.

== Summary ==
Day 1	Entrances	Jim & Linda, Dappy & Liz, Sam & Jasmine, Lee & Casey, Ollie & Lionel and Luisa & Evander entered the house in pairs and handcuffed to each other.
Day 1	Twists	Shortly after entering the house, Jim & Linda were asked to free one pair of housemates from their handcuffs. They chose Dappy & Liz, but in a further twist, Big Brother announced that Dappy & Liz would now face the first eviction in their pair with another two pairs joining them over the coming days.
Day 2	Tasks	Housemates took part in "Building Blocks of Celebrity" to determine which pair would win freedom from each other and immunity from the first eviction. Taking it in turns, the pairs had to choose a block which applies to one or both of them and place it onto their tower, before sharing a relevant story to the group. As all pairs finished with the same sized towers, they voted for who they thought deserved immunity the most. They chose Jim & Linda.; The remaining handcuffed pairs had another chance to free themselves and win immunity. Big Brother asked them questions about each other, and to win, they simply had to match their answers. As Jasmine and Sam matched the most answers, they won the task.
Day 2	Nominations	Jim & Linda and Jasmine & Sam won immunity from the first eviction. (see tasks)
Day 2	Punishments	Evander was given a warning from Big Brother after he said that gay people are not normal and should be fixed during a conversation with Luisa.
Day 3	Tasks	The remaining handcuffed pairs had one final chance to win immunity for themselves. Each pair had to untie themselves and a key for their handcuffs from knotted rope. The pair who completed this in the fastest time would be free and immune from the first eviction. This pair was Lionel & Ollie. Despite failing the tasks, Casey & Lee and Evander & Luisa's handcuffs were removed.
Day 3	Nominations	Lionel & Ollie won immunity (see tasks), meaning Casey & Lee, Dappy & Liz and Evander & Luisa face the first eviction.
Day 4	Tasks	The housemates woke to find a UFO in the garden for their first shopping task. Housemates had to pass individual challenges set by aliens. These included testing Lee and Liz' physical pain limits, seeing whether Jasmine and Luisa could identify which housemate tweets from viewers were about, Jim indulging in a gruesome meal with the alien and housemates being abducted and staying overnight in a spaceship.
Day 4	Punishments	Dappy was given a warning from Big Brother after using the word "bent" to describe gay people during a conversation with Jasmine.
Day 5	Tasks	The shopping task continued, and Jim and Luisa had to steal housemates' items to be able to return to the house from the spaceship. Finally, to free the remaining housemates, Dappy and Evander had to destroy alien egg pods then answer a series of questions about their fellow housemates in an allotted time in order to win a luxury shopping budget.
Day 6	Twists	Casey & Lee were fake evicted and moved into the Bolt Hole, where they were to live in secret from the other housemates.
Day 6	Nominations	Housemates nominated for the first time. With Evander, Jasmine, Jim, Liz and Luisa receiving the most nominations, they all faced the first eviction.
Day 7	Tasks	Housemates were told that the viewers had voted in a poll about them, but in reality the answers were chosen by Casey and Lee. They decided the top two in each category such as "Most Fake" or "Most Rude", and then decided which of the two housemates should come top of the poll and therefore be covered in slime. Meanwhile, the other housemates had to guess which of the two came top of the poll.
Day 7	Punishments	As punishment for discussing nominations, Dappy had to wear a nappy until further notice.
Day 8	Twists	The three housemates with the most votes, Jasmine, Jim and Liz were saved from eviction leaving Evander and Luisa facing a twist. Casey and Lee had the final decision over who was evicted and they chose Evander. Casey and Lee then returned to the house.
Day 8	Exits	Evander became the first housemate to be evicted.
Day 9	Tasks	Sam was given a secret mission to win the housemates' family photos. To pass she had to lose her temper with one housemate, and tell another (Ollie) that she has feelings for them. She passed.; Housemates were invited to two parties as part of a task. Jasmine, Lee, Lionel, Luisa, Ollie and Sam were invited to an "18" party, suitable for adult viewers only, and Casey, Dappy, Jim, Linda and Liz were invited to a "U" party, where they played children's games.
Day 10	Tasks	Housemates split into two teams; Lionel, Casey, Linda, Liz, Luisa, Ollie being the Knights, and Dappy, Jasmine, Jim, Lee, Sam being the Ninnyhammers. Both teams went head to head in mini games to see which team was the overall winner.
Day 10	Nominations	Housemates nominated for the second time, this time it was face-to-face. As Jasmine, Jim, Liz and Luisa received the most nominations, they faced eviction.
Day 11	Tasks	The second shopping task began with the housemates voting as a "democracy" for which food they wanted to eat over the course of the task. However, it was revealed to Jim afterwards that he had control over all the other answers in the task and unbeknownst to his fellow housemates, their votes would count for nothing. Over the course of the day, housemates were called to their pods to answer questions. Questions included "Most Boring" and "Most Annoying" where the housemate that Jim chose would face punishments.
Day 12	Tasks	The housemates continued their democracy shopping task. At the end of the task, the housemates were told that their votes had been for nothing and that one housemate had all the power. Each housemate then placed a vote on the housemate they thought the power belonged to. They chose Jim, and as a result of Jim failing his task, the housemates failed the shopping task.
Day 12	Punishments	The previous night, Lionel and Luisa had to sleep in "the most annoying room" as part of the shopping task, and despite being told not to, Luisa climbed over a fence in the room to steal some champagne and chocolates. Also, despite the housemates having to hand in any beauty products as part of the shopping task, some housemates refused to hand them over. This resulted in the housemates having no hot water until further notice.
Day 13	Tasks	Housemates split into two teams to take part in a boxing task set by ex-housemate Evander. A housemate from each team took to the ring blindfolded and were asked a question "Who said... about...?" The non-blindfolded housemates simply had to guide the blindfolded housemate towards the right answer by shouting directions at them. The team who got to the answer the fastest won.
Day 13	Exits	Jasmine became the second housemate to be evicted.
Day 13	Twists	Shortly after Jasmine's eviction, the housemates were told that everyone would face the next eviction. However, Jasmine was allowed to save two of these housemates. She chose Casey and Linda.
Day 13	Nominations	Dappy, Jim, Lee, Lionel, Liz, Luisa, Ollie and Sam were chosen as the next housemates to face eviction. (see twists)
Day 14	Tasks	Liz was given the chance to write an article about her fellow housemates and her experience so far in the house. Dappy was chosen to help her take notes as she interviewed housemates of her choice. These housemates were Casey, Jim and Lionel. She then presented her finished piece to the group.
Day 15	Tasks	Lee and Ollie took part in a task to win a date with their "superfan". They took it in turns to complete an obstacle course and the person to complete the course in the fastest time won the date. Lee won this, but unbeknownst to him, the "superfan" was actually an actress and had a secret earpiece where she was given questions from the other housemates to ask Lee. To pass the task, Lee had to believe it was a genuine fan. The housemates passed.
Day 15	Exits	Lionel became the third housemate to be evicted.
Day 16	Tasks	Housemates took part in a talent show, "In The Limelight", hosted by Jim. Each housemate had the chance to show off their talent and be judged by the three judges, Jim, Linda and Luisa. Ollie and Sam were announced the winners of the talent show after they acted out a fake "constructed reality" scene.
Day 16	Punishments	As Liz discussed nominations the previous night, the housemates were asked to give her one item of dirty clothing each so she could hand wash them for her punishment.
Day 17	Tasks	Luisa was given a "secret mission" to make Jim disagree with her, get Dappy to rap with her, get a compliment from Linda and to make Liz laugh. However, she was unaware that everyone else knew what her task was and to pass it, they had to make her fail. As Luisa failed her mission, the whole house passed the task and won cooking ingredients.
Day 17	Nominations	Jim, Liz and Sam received the most nominations from their housemates and faced the next eviction. After they were told they were nominated, they were shown who nominated them.
Day 18	Tasks	The housemates were given a North Pole shopping task, where Casey, Dappy, Lee and Luisa became the huskies and the other housemates became the explorers. During their time in the "North Pole", the housemates came across different mini-tasks to win time towards the final game at the end of the task. Big Brother told the huskies that they'd be staying in the kennel overnight, however the explorers didn't realise that they were actually living in luxury next door in the "Mutt's Nuts" pub, and that the real task was to keep their night of luxury a secret.
Day 19	Tasks	The shopping task continued and the huskies still had to convince the explorers that they'd spent the night in bad conditions instead of in luxury. The explorers were also asked questions in the Diary Room from the "viewers" when actually they were from the huskies, where they were watching their answers. The housemates passed the task as the huskies' night of luxury remained a secret.
Day 19	Punishments	As Dappy and Luisa both discussed nominations, they were asked to clean the bathroom whilst wearing a twosie.
Day 20	Tasks	Ollie and Sam were asked not to "sit on the fence" as they were asked about different events that have happened in the house so far. They both had to choose a side to stand on and explain their reasons for choosing that side. As Ollie and Sam expressed enough opinions to satisfy Big Brother, they won a luxury hamper.
Day 20	Exits	Liz became the fourth housemate to be evicted.
Day 20	Nominations	Housemates nominated face-to-face. They chose Jim, Lee, Linda, Luisa and Ollie, who therefore faced the fifth eviction.
Day 20	Punishments	During face-to-face nominations Luisa attempted to change her nomination. As a result, her power to nominate was rescinded.
Day 21	Tasks	The nominated housemates, Jim, Lee, Linda, Luisa and Ollie were asked to make a campaign about themselves and why they should be saved in the upcoming eviction. They were also asked to make a campaign against another nominated housemate of their choice and to say why they shouldn't be saved.
Day 22	Tasks	Housemates were set a selfie task, in which a giant camera was placed on a wall and housemates had to pose for selfies whenever they were asked to do so by Big Brother. Jim had to pose for a selfie with the housemate he thought was the most fake, and Sam had to pose with the housemate she fancied the most.; All housemates were asked to spend time with Jim and confide in him about a problem they've had in the house. However, Linda refused to take part in the task.
Day 22	Exits	Linda became the fifth housemate to be evicted.
Day 22	Twists	After Linda's eviction, housemates were told that they had all made it to the final. However, this was a lie, and the housemate with the fewest votes was evicted on Day 24.
Day 23	Tasks	The housemates' next task was "For Whom the Bell Tolls", in which housemates had to remain frozen during the period from when they heard a grandfather clock in the living room chime to when it chimed again. During the time that housemates were frozen, various guests visited the house. These included Lee's fellow Blue band members, Antony Costa, Duncan James and Simon Webbe, Sam's mum, Ollie's mum and ex-housemate Jasmine. However, Lee spoke to Jasmine during her visit, breaking the rules of the task.
Day 24	Tasks	The "For Whom the Bell Tolls" task continued, and the housemates received visits from Casey's mum, Luisa's mum, Dappy's friend, Jim's wife and daughter, and host Emma Willis, who announced the results of the surprise eviction. (see exits)
Day 24	Punishments	As Lee failed to ignore Jasmine during her visit for the "For Whom the Bell Tolls" task, he was told to sit still in the Diary Room whilst the other housemates came in one by one to make him look silly with the help of some props.
Day 24	Exits	Lee became the sixth housemate to be evicted in a surprise twist during the "For Whom the Bell Tolls" task.
Day 25	Tasks	Dappy was called to the Diary Room where he was surrounded by a number of random items. He was then given a secret mission to make a rap for his fellow housemates about as many of the random items as he could. For every item he rapped about, he won them for the house.; Housemates were given the opportunity to ask their fellow housemates anonymous questions. One by one the housemates took it in turns to answer questions in the "Last Chance Saloon" that were either asked by their fellow housemates or by viewers.
Day 26	Tasks	For their last night in the house, Big Brother gave the housemates a "Last Supper" where they enjoyed a three course meal. They were also given conversation starters which they had to discuss during their meals.
Day 27	Exits	Casey left the house in sixth place, followed by Sam who finished fifth. Luisa came fourth, before Ollie left in third. Jim was then announced as the winner, meaning that Dappy had finished in second place.

== Production ==
=== Background ===
The series was officially confirmed on 3 April 2012 when Channel 5 renewed the show until 2014.

=== Logo ===
The official new eye logo for the series was released on 27 November 2013. The centre of the eye has turned into one of the many cameras which are located around the house.

=== Presenters ===
Emma Willis returned to present the main show for her second celebrity series, as well as selected episodes of Big Brother's Bit on the Side. Rylan Clark returned to present Bit on the Side, but his co-host and Big Brother's Bit on the Psych host AJ Odudu was dropped. Clark hosted Bit on the Psych alongside Iain Lee, who was previously a regular panellist on the show. Celebrity Big Brother 12 housemate and former Loose Women panellist Carol McGiffin is head panellist on the show.

=== Sponsorship ===
The series sponsor was again, casino website SuperCasino.

=== Bit on the Side scheduling ===
For the first time since it launched in 2011, spin-off show Big Brother's Bit on the Side only aired six days a week, with Channel 5 opting not to renew the Sunday edition, which last year ran in a lunch-time time slot and was hosted by Clark. Bit on the Side aired Monday to Friday with Bit on the Psych remaining on Saturdays.

=== House ===
The official house pictures were released on 16 December 2013. The theme for the series is 'Russian Opulence' and features the same layout as Big Brother 14 and Celebrity Big Brother 12, with minor changes. The house has a high class upgrade featuring a grand fireplace and opulent surroundings along with the small hot tub used last series.

== Launch night twist ==
On Day 1, Jim and Linda became the first handcuffed couple to enter the house. Upon entering, they were immediately called to the diary room where Big Brother disclosed that after all housemates had entered in handcuffed pairs, they would have the power to unlock one couple including themselves. When it came to the moment, they chose Dappy and Liz. However, as they were chosen to be unlocked, they would automatically face the first public vote as a pair.

== Ratings ==
Official ratings are taken from BARB and include Channel 5 +1.

For the first time since Big Brother 7 in 2006, the final was more watched than the launch show: 3.69m viewers watched the launch show, but 3.71m tuned in to the final.

	Official viewers (millions)				
	Week 1		Week 2	Week 3	Week 4
Saturday		2.14	2.41	2.45	2.32
Sunday		2.58	2.54	2.83	3.23
Monday		2.68	2.34	2.85	3.18
Tuesday		2.55	2.76	2.87	3.08
Wednesday		2.83	2.85	2.43	3.53
Thursday		2.44	2.57	2.46	
Friday	3.45	2.86	2.83	2.85	
Weekly average	2.69		2.61	2.68	3.07
Running average	2.69		2.66	2.66	2.74
Series average	2.74				
blue-coloured boxes denote live shows.
