= Secret Love =

Secret Love may refer to either a secret admirer or:

== Film, TV and theatre ==
- Secret Love (1916 film), directed by Robert Z. Leonard
- Secret Love (1994 film), directed by Edgardo "Boy" Vinarao
- Secret Love (2010 film), directed by Ryu Hoon-i
- Secret Love (South Korean TV series), a 2013 South Korean TV drama
- Secret Love (Armenian TV series), an Armenian romantic melodrama television series
- Secret-Love, or The Maiden-Queen, a 1667 play by John Dryden
- A Secret Love, a 2020 documentary film directed by Chris Bolan

== Music ==
=== Albums ===
- Secret Love (Tete Montoliu album), 1977
- Secret Love (Vincent Herring album), 1993
- Secret Love (Lorrie Morgan album), 1998
- Secret Love (Dry Cleaning album), 2026

=== Songs ===
- "Secret Love" (Bee Gees song), 1991
- "Secret Love" (Doris Day song), 1953
- "Secret Love" (Kim Sozzi song), 2010
- "Secret Love" (Stevie Nicks song), 2011
- "Secret Love" (B.A.P song), 2012
- "I Am Who I Am/Secret Love", by Lee Ryan
- "Secret Love", by The Balham Alligators from Gateway to the South
- "Secret Love", by Hunter Hayes from Storyline
- "Secret Love", by Kelly Price from Soul of a Woman
- "Secret Love", by Mariah Carey from The Emancipation of Mimi
- "Secret Love", by S Club from Seeing Double
- "A Secret Love", by Toto from Hydra
- "Secret Love", by JoJo from Shark Tale

== See also ==
- "Secret Love Song", a 2016 song by Little Mix
- "Secret Lovers", a 1985 song by Atlantic Starr
- The Secret Lovers, a 2005 South Korean TV drama
- The Secret Lovers (novel), a 1977 novel by Charles McCarry
- Secret Wars: Secret Love, a 2015 issue of Secret Wars
