= Celebrity Big Brother 2014 =

Celebrity Big Brother 2014 may refer to:

- Celebrity Big Brother 13
- Celebrity Big Brother 14
