= Reinforce Love =

Single by Lee Ryan
- A-side: "Reinforce Love"
- Released: 10 December 2007
- Recorded: Los Angeles, United States
- Genre: Pop
- Length: 4:03
- Label: Tall Tale Records
- Songwriter: Lee Ryan
- Producer: Andrew Phillips

"Reinforce Love" is a charity single, recorded by British singer Lee Ryan. The song was released as a single on 10 December 2007 for the cancer charity project CLIC Sargent. The track did not receive any airplay on British radio stations, and did not appear in any BBC Radio playlists. The video was released at the beginning of November 2007.

== Track listing ==
- CD single
1. "Reinforce Love" (Single Edit) – 4:03
2. "Reinforce Love" (Fugitive's Full Strength Mix) – 5:27
3. "Reinforce Love" (K-Gee's Reggae Bounce Mix) – 4:08
4. "Reinforce Love" (K-Gee's Reggae Bounce Instrumental) – 4:08
5. "Reinforce Love" (Video) – 4:15
- Digital download
1. "Reinforce Love" (Single Edit) – 4:03
2. "Reinforce Love" (Fugitive's Full Strength Mix) – 5:27
3. "Reinforce Love" (K-Gee's Reggae Bounce Mix) – 4:08
4. "Reinforce Love" (K-Gee's Reggae Bounce Instrumental) – 4:08

== Charts ==
Chart (2007)	Peak position
UK Singles (OCC)	101
