= Lee Ryan =

English singer (born 1983)

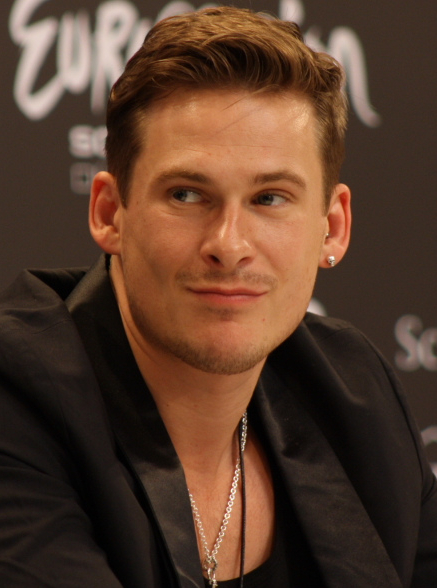
- Ryan in 2011

Background information
- Born: 17 June 1983 (age 43); Chatham, Kent, England
- Genres: Pop; R&B
- Occupations: Singer; songwriter; actor; voice actor
- Instrument: Vocals
- Years active: 2000–present
- Label: Sony BMG
- Member of: Blue

Lee Ryan (born 17 June 1983) is an English singer, songwriter, actor and voice actor. He is the lead singer of the boy band Blue. During his time with Blue, they sold over 15 million records worldwide (to 2025), and performed with and released records with Elton John and Stevie Wonder.

As a music solo artist, he had success with his album Lee Ryan and singles. As an actor, he played Harry "Woody" Woodward in EastEnders from 2017–2018.

== Early life ==
Lee Ryan was born 17 June 1983, in Chatham, Kent. His parents split up when he was very young, and was raised by his mother, sister Gemma and his grandmother. Ryan went to Bedonwell School before attending the Independent Performing Arts School: Belcanto London Academy (BLA), which later closed in 2009. He then furthered his arts education at the Italia Conti Academy of Theatre Arts.

== Career ==
=== 2000–2005: Career with Blue ===
Ryan is a member of boy band Blue along with Simon Webbe, Duncan James and Antony Costa. The group has sold over 15 million records worldwide (to 2025), and have performed with and released records with Sir Elton John and Stevie Wonder. Blue split up in 2004, only to reform later in 2011.

Ryan had three number one hits while with Blue, and co-directed the video for Blue's single "Breathe Easy", which he also wrote and which was shot in Prague. In 2001 the group were in New York during the September 11 attacks after which Ryan commented that "This New York thing is being blown out of proportion" and asked "What about whales? They are ignoring animals that are more important. Animals need saving and that's more important." The other members of the group tried to silence Ryan, but he went on.This caused a huge media backlash that resulted in Blue losing a record deal in the United States and campaigns to sack Ryan from the line up. Lee was gunged during an episode of Live & Kicking in August 2001 as part of the Stop The Snot segment.

=== 2005–2008: Lee Ryan and stage ===
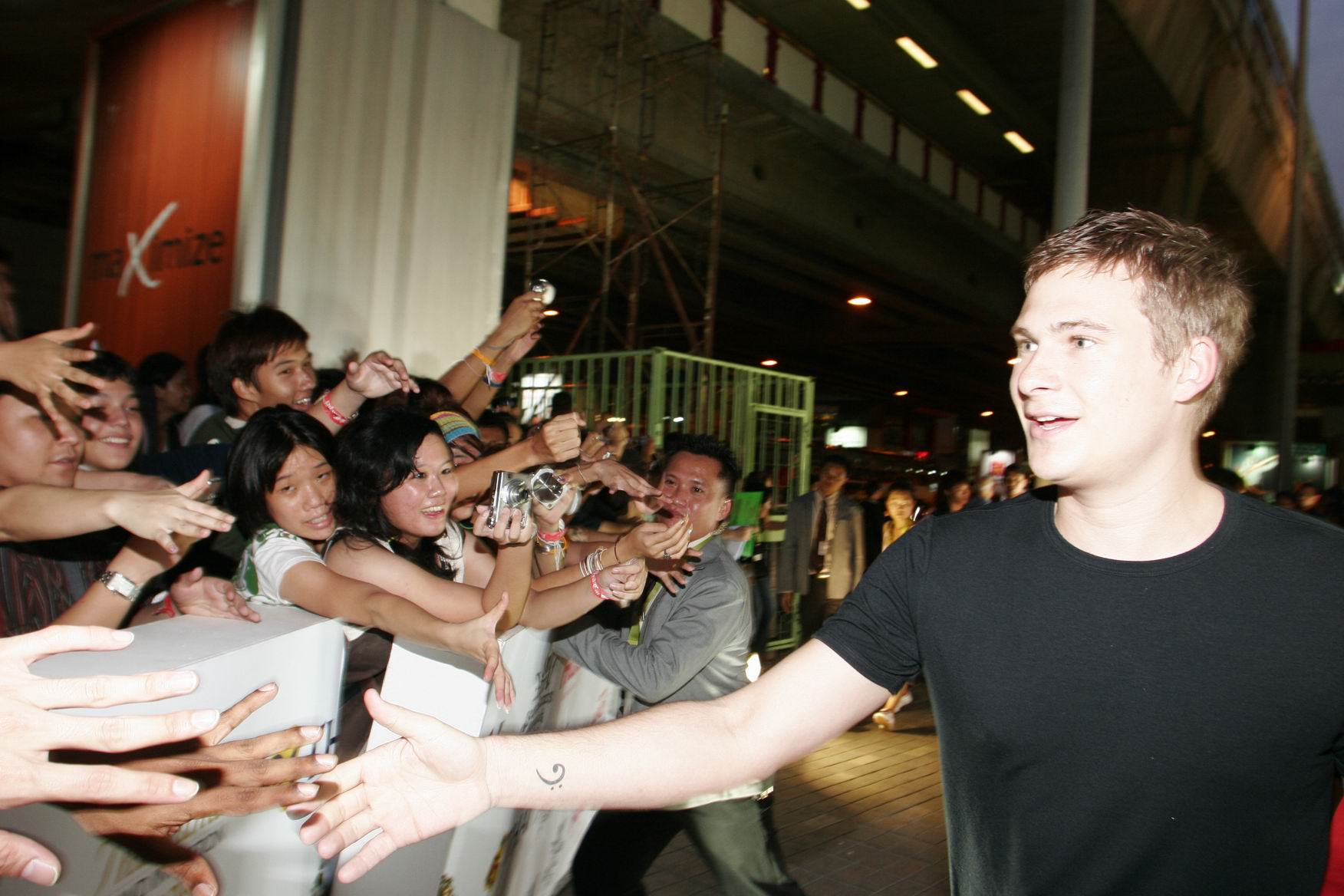
Ryan in 2006

Ryan released his first single "Army of Lovers" in July 2005. It debuted at No. 3 in the UK Singles Chart, and hit No. 1 in Italy. In August 2005, Ryan released his debut album, Lee Ryan, to mixed reviews. The album reached No. 6 in the UK Albums Chart and No. 3 in Italy. "Turn Your Car Around" was the second single lifted from the album which had moderate success. In January 2006, Ryan released his third and final single in the UK "When I Think of You". The song reached No. 15 in the UK. "Real Love" was used for the end credits of the film Ice Age: The Meltdown which later led to Ryan voicing the part of an elk in the UK version of the film and Eddie in the Italian version. After the relative success of his first solo album, Ryan started planning his second solo album. The single "Reinforce Love" was released in December 2007. The single was being released for Great Ormond Street Hospital and CLIC Sargent, which were the two charities that Ryan was touring for in November and December 2007, with young voices. The album was then postponed, and finally cancelled. He appeared in the video for the single "Red Light" by a British girlband named Fe-Nix. In September 2007, he appeared as one of the contestants in Hell's Kitchen. However he rowed with Marco Pierre White about White's use of the term "pikey", and subsequently left the show. In August and September 2008, Ryan acted alongside Natalie Casey in The Pretender Agenda at The New Players Theatre in London. In June 2008 Ryan was found guilty of assaulting a taxi driver in Oxted and ordered to pay compensation to the victim.

=== 2009–2010: Film and cancelled second album ===
In March 2010, Ryan confirmed that he had signed a new record deal with Geffen Records, due to last until 2013. Later that month, it was announced that Ryan's first album on his new record label, Confessions, was due to be released in October 2010. The first single from the album, "Secret Love", was released as a double A-Side with "I Am Who I Am" on 4 July 2010. The single peaked at number 33 on the UK Singles Chart. Following this, it was announced that Geffen were set to drop Ryan from the label, before work on his album had been completed. Ryan announced in January 2011 that there was no deal to release his album.

The track listing for Ryan's aborted album was as follows: "Secret Love", "I Am Who I Am", "Guardian Angel", "Perfect Strangers", "I Don't Wanna Let You Down", "I Love Your Smile", "It's Not Me", "Confessions", "Light of Your Soul", "Peaches", "Reinforce Love", "Suffice to Say", "To See the Stars", "Stop the Rain", "Why Me" and "Stand Up as People".

=== 2011–2019: Blue return, EastEnders and Rip it Up ===
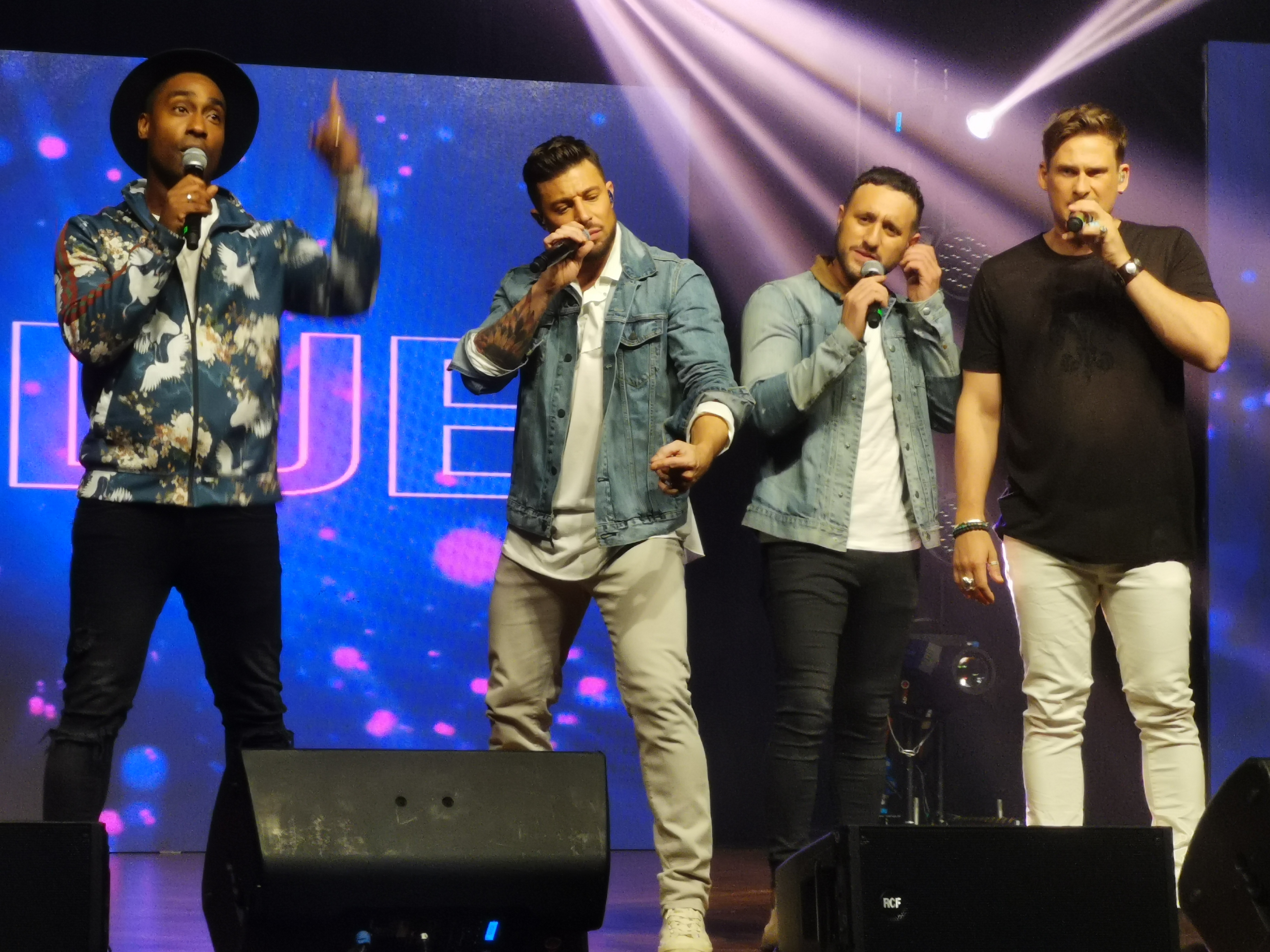
Ryan (right) performing with Blue

Ryan stated in January 2011 that he was working on an album with Blue to be released later in the year. Blue represented the United Kingdom at the Eurovision Song Contest 2011 in Düsseldorf, Germany, with the song "I Can", placing them 11th overall with 100 points.

In 2013, Blue released "Hurt Lovers" the first single from their fourth album Roulette.

In August 2013, Ryan and Duncan James appeared in an episode of comedy panel show Through the Keyhole in which the host showed around their home in London.

Ryan appeared in Celebrity Big Brother 13 in 2014. Following the show he entered a relationship with fellow Big Brother participant Jasmine Waltz. Waltz split with Ryan a few weeks later claiming on Twitter that Ryan had cheated on her with a man. Ryan came out as bisexual during his time on Big Brother, later stating in an interview, "I'm very open about what I've done in the past but that was the easiest way to come out. I did so much other stuff that people didn't even notice." During his time on Big Brother Ryan admitted he sleeps with his Blue bandmate Duncan James stating, "I work with Duncan, I go on holiday with Duncan, I live with Duncan." Asked: "Do you have sex with Duncan?", he replied: "Yeah all the time".

In November 2014, Blue announced they had signed a two-album record deal with Sony Music. The band released their fifth studio album Colours on 9 March 2015. He was in Strictly Come Dancing 2018, but went out in the third round.

On 15 February 2017, it was confirmed that Ryan had landed a role in the BBC soap opera, EastEnders. He was cast as Woody Woodward, initially for a short stint between 18 April and 19 May. It was later announced that Woody would be promoted to a regular role and that Ryan had signed a one-year contract with the show. He later received 2017 Inside Soap Award nomination for Best Newcomer. Unsure his contract would be extended, Ryan signed to play Aladdin opposite Paul Merton's Widow Twanky in panto in Wimbledon, and was hence written out of EastEnders.

In 2019, he was a candidate in the seventh season of the British reality TV-show Celebs Go Dating. From September to November 2019 Lee Ryan went on a UK-Tour with the musical "Rip it Up the 70s".

=== 2021–present: Blue 20th anniversary ===
On 30 November 2021, the group confirmed they would be going on an arena tour to celebrate their 20th anniversary, it was also confirmed that Atomic Kitten would be supporting them on the tour. When interviewed on This Morning the group also confirmed that they were back in the studio recording, a new album is expected to follow along with the tour.

On 11 April 2022, the group announced that their sixth studio album Heart & Soul would be released on 9 September 2022. On 20 May, the group unveiled the track listing for the album on their social media accounts, following with first single "Haven't Found You Yet". Later that year, the group released the single "Dance with Me", a cover of the 2001 112 single.

== Personal life ==
Since starting his career in Blue, Ryan has been in relationships with some famous female celebrities. Between 2003 and 2004 he was engaged to Atomic Kitten member Liz McClarnon. He also been in short-lived relationships with his fellow Celebrity Big Brother contestants Casey Batchelor and Jasmine Waltz, and has also been linked to Stephanie Saunders, Emily Oldfield and Alicia Douvall.

In 2023, Ryan revealed he was going to be a father for the fifth time with his wife Verity Paris. He already shares a two-year-old and a one-year-old daughter with Paris. He is also a father to daughter Bluebell, with ex Jessica Keevil and shares son Rayn, born in 2008, with former partner Samantha Miller.

In 2014, Ryan stated he had had a regular sexual relationship with his bandmate Duncan James during Blue's early years. Ryan then clarified in further interviews that this was not correct. Ryan did however define himself as bisexual in an interview on Good Morning Britain in August 2019: "For people to have some kind of prejudice against these kinds of things is just ignorant".

Ryan has been diagnosed with dyslexia, attention deficit hyperactivity disorder (ADHD) and Asperger syndrome.

=== Alcohol abuse and legal issues ===
In August 2003, Ryan was arrested and charged with driving with excess alcohol in central London. In May 2014, Ryan pleaded guilty to criminal damage and failing to provide a specimen after being caught driving erratically in April. On two occasions in 2020, Ryan was charged with driving a Mercedes at 70 mph in a 60 mph limit in Peterborough, but the charges were dismissed as the prosecution offered no evidence, due to there being no means of proving who was driving. However, Ryan was later charged and found guilty at trial of two counts of failing to provide information about the driver. At a subsequent hearing, Magistrate Alison Marsh gave Ryan two lots of six points against his driving licence, resulting in a disqualification from driving for 12 months.

In January 2023, Ryan was convicted of four charges at Ealing Magistrates court. He had been found guilty of being drunk on an aircraft, assaulting a police officer and behaving in an abusive way towards a crew member, as well as a racially aggravated assault of a flight cabin crew member, which happened at London City Airport on 31 July 2022. In September 2023, Ryan was given a 12-month suspended sentence and ordered to pay £2,500 compensation to one party, £750 to another, plus £510 in court costs.

== Discography ==
=== Studio albums ===
List of albums, with selected chart positions and certifications
Title	Album details	Peak chart positions							Certifications
Title	Album details	UK	BEL	GER	JAP	IRE	ITA	SWI	Certifications
Lee Ryan	Released: 1 August 2005; Formats: CD, digital download; Labels: Sony BMG	6	68	79	40	42	3	61	BPI: Silver; FIMI: Gold

=== Singles ===
==== As lead artist ====
List of singles, with selected chart positions and certifications
Title	Year	Peak chart positions										Album
Title	Year	UK	AUT	BEL	FRA	GER	HUN	IRE	ITA	SCO	SWI	Album
"Army of Lovers"	2005	3	41	25	—	29	—	17	1	1	49	Lee Ryan
"Turn Your Car Around"	2005	12	41	2	—	52	—	33	2	10	—	Lee Ryan
"When I Think of You"	2006	15	—	—	—	—	—	29	—	11	—	Lee Ryan
"Real Love"	2006	—	—	5	10	56	28	—	—	—	74	Lee Ryan
"Reinforce Love"	2007	101	—	—	—	—	—	—	—	—	—	Non-album singles
"I Am Who I Am / Secret Love"	2010	33	—	—	—	—	—	—	—	49	—	Non-album singles
"Ghost"	2019	—	—	—	—	—	—	—	—	—	—	Non-album singles
"Mockingbirds"	2020	—	—	—	—	—	—	—	—	—	—	Non-album singles
"Swayed"	2020	—	—	—	—	—	—	—	—	—	—	Non-album singles
"One More Night"	2025	—	—	—	—	—	—	—	—	—	—	Non-album singles
"—" denotes releases that did not chart or were not released in that territory.

==== As featured artist ====
Title	Year	Album
"Lovers of New York" (Rubylux featuring Lee Ryan)	2014	The World Goes Quiet
"He Ain't Heavy He's My Brother" (Homeless Worldwide and Friends featuring Lee Ryan)	2019	Non-album single

== Filmography ==
=== Film ===
Year	Title	Role	Note
2006	Ice Age: The Meltdown	Eddie (voice)	Italian dub
2009	Ice Age: Dawn of the Dinosaurs	Eddie (voice)	Italian dub
2010	The Heavy	Reuben	
2012	Ice Age: Continental Drift	Eddie (voice)	Italian dub Ischia Dubbing Award at the Ischia Global Film & Music Festival
2016	Ice Age: Collision Course	Eddie (voice)	Italian dub Ischia Dubbing Award at the Ischia Global Film & Music Festival

=== Television ===
Year	Title	Role	Notes
2000	Holby City	Arian Kirkwall	Episode: "Too Much Too Young"
2007	Most Haunted	Himself	Episode: "Sutton House"
2007	Hell's Kitchen	Contestant	
2014	Celebrity Big Brother	Contestant	Series 13
2017–2018	EastEnders	Harry "Woody" Woodward	Main role
2018	Strictly Come Dancing	Contestant	Series 16
2019	Celebs Go Dating	Himself	Episode: "Lee Ryan"

=== Video games ===
Year	Title	Role
2006	Ice Age 2: The Meltdown	Eddie (voice)
