= Lee Ryan (album) =

Studio album by Lee Ryan
- Released: 1 August 2005
- Recorded: 2004–2005 (Los Angeles, United States)
- Genres: Pop, pop rock
- Length: 43:40
- Labels: Brightside, Sony BMG
- Producers: Ash Howes, Martin Harrington, Cutfather & Joe, Remee, Steve Mac, Lee Ryan, Hugh Goldsmith (exec.)

Italian cover

Singles from Lee Ryan
- 1. "Army of Lovers" Released: 18 July 2005; 2. "Turn Your Car Around" Released: 10 October 2005; 3. "When I Think of You" Released: 30 January 2006; 4. "Real Love" Released: 7 April 2006

Lee Ryan is the debut and only solo studio album to be released by English boy band Blue lead singer, Lee Ryan. The album was the first release from the singer on the record label Sony BMG in August 2005, spawning 4 singles, all of which entered on domestic music charts, pushing the album to moderate success.

== Background and production ==
At the end of February 2005 Lee Ryan was diagnosed with nodules on his throat, causing the cancellation of the farewell tour of Blue. The tour was scheduled to start on 11 of March. With no further plans with the band, all members decided to focus on their solo projects. According to the spokesperson of the band this was "not the end" and "they're taking a break, but they haven't officially split". Ryan revealed on ITV2 documentary The Big Reunion that soon after, he was approached by record executives to pursue a solo career. He signed a $1.1 million record deal with Sony BMG and was looked after by music chief Hugh Goldsmith to help him produce and write his debut album. The record label had high hopes for his career, hoping that he would become the new Robbie Williams. Lee Ryan admitted that there were parallels between himself and the former Take That star, but is reluctant to encourage the comparison. He said: "Aside from making a similar career change, I don't want to be compared too heavily with Robbie's style - but I do admire him for his success as a solo artist." According to an interview with Craig McLean, Ryan wrote a lot of tracks for the album, enough to fill half of his second album as well. He mainly worked with Ash Howes and Martin Harrington, who had already worked with Natalie Imbruglia and Dido, while had recently produced Kylie Minogue's hit single Love at First Sight. Lee Ryan wanted to collaborate with Kylie Minogue, hoping she would sing backing vocals on a track. His plans unfortunately never materialised. Army of Lovers was chosen as the first single of the album. Dolce & Gabbana also signed Ryan up to be the face of their new line of clothing in the United Kingdom. Ryan did not receive any money for the deal, he was just going to be provided with many new clothes and he should wear at least one piece of Dolce & Gabbana when promoting the album or performing live.

== Release and promotion ==
The album was released on 1 August 2005, debuting at #6 on the UK Albums Chart which was its peak position. It remained inside the top 75 for another three weeks before disappearing from the chart completely. The album was also released in Europe to moderate success. It managed thought to reach #3 in Italy. Ryan did several appearances to European television channels in order to promote his album, including an appearance in TVP2, where he sang an unplugged version of "In the Morning" and Italy where he sang the Italian version of the first single Army of Lovers "Ho Te". Shortly after the release of the album Ryan released his second single, Turn Your Car Around, which was also moderately successful, doing no boost to the album sales, which remained outside the top 75 in the UK. January 2006 saw the release of the album's third single When I Think of You, which peaked at #15 on the UK Singles Chart and while it succeed in promoting the album's sales a bit, as the album re-entered the UK Albums Chart for four more weeks, it became Ryan's last release from the album in the United Kingdom.

The album's fourth single, Real Love, was not released in the United Kingdom due to poor sales of the album and its former singles, however, the song was released across Europe and was used as the theme to the film Ice Age: The Meltdown. Ryan also secured a vocal role in the British version of the film. The song received additional production from Brian Rawling and Paul Meehanfor its release as a single.

Because of the album poor sales Ryan was later dropped from his record label.

== Singles ==
Army of Lovers was the first single from the album, released on 18 July 2005. The single peaked at #3 on the UK Singles Chart, but found higher success staying at #1 for four weeks in Italy. The physical single featured an acoustic version of the song, an album sampler featuring samples of "When I Think of You", "Parking" and "Jump" and the music video.

The second singe released from the album was Turn Your Car Around on 10 October 2005. The single peaked at #12 on the UK Singles Chart, but found higher success peaking at #2 in Italy and reaching #1 in the European Top 20. The physical single featured three b-sides: "Best of You (BBC Radio 1 Live Lounge)", "These Words (Gold Horizons)" and "Movin' On", as well as the music video. The Italian version of the single also included the song "Ho Te", the Italian version of the first single Army of Lovers.

"When I Think of You" was the third song to be released as single from the album on 30 January 2006. The single peaked at #15 on the UK Singles Chart, before dropping out of the top forty the following week. The physical single featured a new B-side called "I Can Let Go Now".

A final single was released from the album, which also served as the lead single from the film soundtrack Ice Age: The Meltdown. The song Real Love received additional production from Brian Rawling and Paul Meehanfor, being released on 7 April 2006. The single was not released in the UK due to the low sales of the album and the mediocre sales of the previous singles, however it found success in Italy and Australia. The single also featured a club remix by the Sharp Boys.

== Critical reception ==
Professional ratings
Review scores
| Source | Rating |
|---|---|
| AllMusic | 3.5/5 stars |
| Laut.de | 2/5 stars |
| MTV Asia | 8/10 |
| The Observer | 5/5 stars |
| RTÉ | 1/5 stars |
| Yahoo! Music UK | 7/10 |

The critical reception of the album was mixed. Emma Morgan from Yahoo! Music UK concluded: "It's all very mature and tasteful and cosmopolitan [...] and you can hear that serious money has been spent on it, rather than the label just hiring a bunch of hack musicians and programmers to pad out the background. Like James Blunt's marketing team, they've bought themselves a surefire hit album and surely the only thing that can mess things up for them now is Lee's big mouth." Polly Vernon from The Observer found the album predictable but not without charm, weighed down by familiar romantic ballads yet lifted by moments of surprise, especially "Turn Your Car Around" and the car-themed "Parking." Despite a couple of weak tracks, she felt Ryan’s voice was impossible to fault.

Angelina Yeo, writing for MTV Asia concluded that "Ryan's self-titled debut album sets out plenty of reasons to believe that this heartthrob, no matter how long his chiseled beauty holds up, has got soul to burn." Jon O'Brien from AllMusic gave the album 3,5 out of 5 stars, stating that "Ryan has produced a surprisingly sophisticated and authentic debut." He also gave credit to his vocal abilities while recognising his "undeniable talents." Michael Hubbard from MusicOMH found that Lee Ryan's debut album "showcases vocal prowess" but he thought that the songs "are a mixed bag of made-to-order drivetime ditties and flaccid shelf filler." Bine Jankowski of Laut.de gave 2 out of 5 stars, commenting that the album was extremely mainstream, ideal for dentist's waiting rooms and lifts. Caroline Sullivan commented on Ryan's debut album as a disappointment, while reviewing Simon Webbe's Sanctuary on The Guardian. Writing for RTÉ, Katie Moten called Lee Ryan a "less-than-stellar debut from an artist who's done much better work [...] If his debut is anything to go by, he has his work cut out."

== Track listing ==
| No. | Title | Writer(s) | Producer(s) | Length |
|---|---|---|---|---|
| 1. | "Army of Lovers" | Nigel Hoyle | Ash Howes, Martin Harrington | 2:58 |
| 2. | "Turn Your Car Around" | Ben Novak | Howes, Harrington | 3:32 |
| 3. | "When I Think of You" | Alan Gowdy, Bill Biddle, Lynn Sylvers, Mike Hamilton | Howes, Harrington | 3:14 |
| 4. | "Real Love" | John Reid, Joe Belmatti, Mich Hansen, Remee | Cutfather & Joe, Howes, Harrington, Remee^{[a]} | 3:15 |
| 5. | "Parking" | Steve Mac, Wayne Hector | Mac | 3:37 |
| 6. | "Wish the Whole World Knew" | Howes, Lee Ryan, Harrington, Hector | Howes, Harrington | 4:09 |
| 7. | "Close to You" | Ryan, Hoyle | Howes, Harrington | 3:26 |
| 8. | "Miss My Everything" | Ryan, Robert Taylor, Shaffer Smith | Howes, Harrington | 2:48 |
| 9. | "Daydreamer" | Ryan, Hoyle | Howes, Harrington | 3:17 |
| 10. | "Jump" | Howes, Ryan, Harrington, Hector | Howes, Harrington | 3:40 |
| 11. | "How Do I?" | Howes, Ryan, Harrington, Hector | Howes, Harrington | 4:15 |
| 12. | "In the Morning" | Ryan, Smith | Howes, Harrington, Ryan^{[a]} | 3:21 |

Japanese bonus tracks
| No. | Title | Writer(s) | Producer(s) | Length |
|---|---|---|---|---|
| 13. | "These Words" | Ryan, Hoyle | Troublemaker | 3:14 |
| 14. | "Movin' On" | Ryan, Octave | Octave 4 O'Vious Ent | 3:30 |
| 15. | "Army of Lovers" (music video) | Hoyle | Howes, Harrington | 3:00 |

Italian bonus tracks
| No. | Title | Writer(s) | Producer(s) | Length |
|---|---|---|---|---|
| 13. | "Ho Te" | Lee Ryan, Luca Campaner, Emanuela Panizzo | Campaner, Panizzo | 3:07 |
| 14. | "These Words" | Ryan, Hoyle | Troublemaker | 3:14 |
| 15. | "Che Viso Avrai" | Lee Ryan, Luca Campaner, Emanuela Panizzo | Campaner, Panizzo | 4:23 |

German bonus tracks
| No. | Title | Writer(s) | Producer(s) | Length |
|---|---|---|---|---|
| 13. | "Best of You" | Dave Grohl, Nate Mendel, Taylor Hawkins, Chris Shiflett | | 3:08 |
| 14. | "I Can Let Go Now" | Ryan, Hoyle | | 3:24 |
| 15. | "Real Love" (Sharp Boys club mix) | Reid, Belmatti, Hansen, Remee | Cutfather & Joe, Howes, Harrington, Remee^{[a]}, Sharp Boys^{[b]} | 7:08 |

Notes

- ^{^[a]} signifies a co-producer
- ^{^[b]} signifies a remixer

== Charts ==
Weekly chart performance for Lee Ryan
| Chart (2005) | Peak position |
|---|---|
| Belgian Albums (Ultratop Flanders) | 68 |
| French Albums (SNEP) | 115 |
| German Albums (Offizielle Top 100) | 79 |
| Greek Albums (IFPI) | 42 |
| Irish Albums (IRMA) | 42 |
| Italian Albums (FIMI) | 3 |
| Italian Albums (Musica e dischi) | 5 |
| Japanese Albums (Oricon) | 40 |
| Scottish Albums (Official Charts) | 7 |
| Swiss Albums (Schweizer Hitparade) | 61 |
| UK Albums (Official Charts) | 6 |

== Certifications and sales ==
| Region | Certification | Certified units/sales |
|---|---|---|
| Italy (FIMI) | Gold | 40,000^{*} |
| United Kingdom (BPI) | Silver | 60,000^{*} |
^{*} Sales figures based on certification alone.
