= Real Love (Lee Ryan song) =

Single by Lee Ryan

from the album Lee Ryan
- B-side: "Real Love" (Sharp Boys Club Mix)
- Released: 13 February 2006
- Recorded: 2005
- Genre: Pop
- Length: 3:07
- Label: Brightside, Sony BMG
- Songwriter(s): John Reid, Joe Belmaati, Mich Hansen, Remee
- Producer(s): Cutfather & Joe, Ash Howes, Martin Harrington, Remee, Brian Rawling, Paul Meehan

Lee Ryan singles chronology
| "When I Think of You" (2006) | "Real Love" (2006) | "I Am Who I Am/Secret Love" (2010) |

"Real Love" is a song by English singer-songwriter Lee Ryan from his debut solo album, Lee Ryan (2005). It was released as the fourth and final single from the album in 2006. The song was originally produced by Cutfather & Joe, Ash Howes, Martin Harrington, and Remee, and it was remixed by Brian Rawling and Paul Meehan for its single release. "Real Love" was not released in Ryan's native United Kingdom, due to the lack of sales for Ryan's previous singles. The track received attention for its use as the theme song for the UK release of the film Ice Age: The Meltdown. The song peaked at No. 57 in Italy and No. 72 in Switzerland.

In 2008, the song was covered by Katharine McPhee and Elliott Yamin for Randy Jackson's debut album Randy Jackson's Music Club, Vol. 1. The song was released on 21 April 2008 and served as the second single from the album. According to USA Today, the song has sold 8,000 copies as of June 2008.

== Track listing ==
- CD single
1. "Real Love" – 3:07
2. "Real Love" (Sharp Boys club mix) – 7:32

== Credits and personnel ==
- Songwriting – John Reid, Joe Belmaati, Mich Hansen, Remee
- Production – Cutfather & Joe, Ash Howes, Martin Harrington, Remee
- Additional production – Brian Rawling, Paul Meehan
- Engineer – David Treahearn, Rob Haggett
- Guitar – Adam Phillips
- Bass – Stefan Olsson
- Keyboards – Paul Meehan
- Mixer – Matt Furmidge, Mike Nocito

Credits adapted from CD single liner notes.

== Charts ==
| Chart (2006) | Peak position |
|---|---|
| Belgium (Ultratop 50 Flanders) | 55 |
| Belgium (Ultratop 50 Wallonia) | 59 |
| Germany (GfK) | 56 |
| Hungary (Rádiós Top 40) | 28 |
| Switzerland (Schweizer Hitparade) | 74 |
| Turkey (Billboard Türkiye) | 172 |
