= The Apprentice (British TV series) series 8 =

Eighth season of UK television series

The Apprentice
- Series 8
- Promo group shot of Alan Sugar, Nick Hewer and Karren Brady standing amongst the candidates for series 8
- Starring: Alan Sugar; Nick Hewer; Karren Brady
- No. of episodes: 14

Release
- Original network: BBC One
- Original release: 21 March – 3 June 2012

Series chronology
- ← Previous; Series 7 Next → Series 9

The eighth series of British reality television series The Apprentice was broadcast in the UK on BBC One, from 21 March to 3 June 2012. While only one minor change was made to the format of the first task, the general format of the programme itself remained virtually unchanged for this series. Alongside the standard twelve episodes, two specials were aired alongside this series – "The Final Five" on 29 May, and "Why I Fired Them" on 2 June. Sixteen candidates took part in the eighth series, with Ricky Martin becoming the overall winner. Excluding specials, the series averaged around 7.35 million viewers during its broadcast.

== Series overview ==
Applications for the eighth series opened while series seven was still on the air, with auditions, interviews and pre-production assessments taking place in July 2011, and production beginning in autumn of that year. Prior to the candidates starting their first task, there was a minor change in the format, whereby candidates were able to settle into their accommodation before beginning the process – up until this series, candidates were not permitted to settle in until after the first task and the resulting boardroom scenes. This series' team names were Phoenix and Sterling.

Of those who took part, Ricky Martin would become the eventual winner, and went on to use Sugar's investment to set up a scientific recruitment company, Hyper Recruitment Solutions (HRS), on 23 October 2012. He would later be invited back as an interviewer for the tenth series. Series runner-up, Nick Holzherr, would later go on to raise £1 million to invest in a new online business, "Whisk", crediting his success with what he learned while participating in the programme.

=== Candidates ===
Candidate	Background	Age	Result
Ricky Martin	Recruitment Manager	26	Winner
Tom Gearing	Director, Fine Wine Investment Company	23	Runner-up
Nick Holzherr	Technology Entrepreneur	25	Fired in the Final
Jade Nash	Business Development Manager	29	Fired in the Final
Adam Corbally	Market trader	32	Fired after eleventh task
Stephen Brady	Sales Manager, Health Clubs	33	Fired after tenth task
Gabrielle Omar	Architect & Entrepreneur	29	Fired after tenth task
Jenna Whittingham	Beauty salon owner	25	Fired after ninth task
Laura Hogg	Bridal shop owner	28	Fired after eighth task
Azhar Siddique	Founder/director of catering and refrigeration company	33	Fired after seventh task
Katie Wright	Editorial and research director	26	Fired after sixth task
Duane Bryan	Drinks Distribution Entrepreneur	29	Fired after fifth task
Jane McEvoy	Director, Food Manufacturing Company	28	Fired after fourth task
Michael Copp	MD kitchen and bedroom furniture retailer	31	Fired after third task
Maria O’Connor	Restaurateur	20	Fired after second task
Bilyana Apostolova	Risk Analyst	25	Fired after first task

=== Performance chart ===
Candidate	Task Number											
Candidate	1	2	3	4	5	6	7	8	9	10	11	12
Ricky	IN	IN	BR	LOSS	LOSE	IN	IN	IN	LOSE	BR	WIN	HIRED
Tom	IN	IN	LOSS	WIN	IN	LOSS	BR	LOSE	WIN	IN	IN	RUNNER-UP
Nick	WIN	IN	IN	LOSS	LOSS	IN	WIN	IN	IN	IN	BR	FIRED
Jade	LOSS	LOSS	IN	IN	IN	LOSS	LOSE	BR	IN	WIN	BR	FIRED
Adam	IN	IN	LOSS	IN	IN	LOSE	LOSS	LOSS	IN	IN	FIRED	
Stephen	IN	IN	LOSS	IN	WIN	LOSS	IN	IN	BR	FIRED		
Gabrielle	LOSE	LOSS	IN	BR	LOSS	IN	IN	WIN	LOSS	FIRED		
Jenna	LOSS	BR	IN	LOSS	LOSS	WIN	IN	IN	FIRED			
Laura	LOSS	LOSS	IN	LOSE	BR	IN	LOSS	FIRED				
Azhar	IN	WIN	LOSS	IN	IN	BR	FIRED					
Katie	BR	LOSS	LOSE	IN	IN	FIRED						
Duane	IN	IN	WIN	LOSS	FIRED							
Jane	LOSS	LOSE	IN	FIRED								
Michael	IN	IN	FIRED									
Maria	LOSS	FIRED										
Bilyana	FIRED											

Key:

The candidate won this series of The Apprentice.
The candidate was the runner-up.
The candidate won as project manager on his/her team, for this task.
The candidate lost as project manager on his/her team, for this task.
The candidate was on the winning team for this task.
The candidate was on the losing team for this task.
The candidate was brought to the final boardroom for this task.
The candidate was fired in this task.
The candidate lost as project manager for this task and was fired.

== Episodes ==
No. overall	No. in series	Title	Original release date	UK viewers (millions)
99	1	"Blank Canvas"	21 March 2012	7.61
Lord Sugar begins a new search for a business partner from a pool of sixteen new candidates. In their first task, each team must brand a selection of blank souvenirs to sell to London tourists. The men brand teddy bears and tote bags with Union Jacks and red buses, selling well despite high ticket prices and quality control problems. The women focus on customisation for their branding, including the option to add a personalised message to souvenirs, but face problems with overspending and a lack of pricing strategy. Sterling lose the task, and Bilyana Apostolova becomes the first to be fired for her poor leadership of her sub-team and her abrasive personality.
100	2	"Household Gadget"	28 March 2012	7.51
For their next task, each team has to create a brand new household item, pitching their design to two major retailers. The men create a tabletop compost bin, securing orders in both pitches. The women create a bathtub splash guard, but provide poor pitches that face criticism for incorrect pricing information and requesting an unrealistic, high-volume order. Phoenix win the task with their design and good pitching skills, leaving Sterling to be questioned over their performance. In the final three, Maria O'Connor is fired for her sub-par contributions and her aggressive behaviour.
101	3	"Condiments"	4 April 2012	7.46
The teams are tasked with creating a new condiment, complete with branding, to sell in London. Sterling create a pineapple and ginger chutney and achieve decent sales, despite having to alter the chutney's recipe. Phoenix create an Italian table sauce, yet secure few sales and face inefficient production, no custom from passing trade. Sterling achieve a large profit from the sale of their chutney, winning the task against the poor sales of Phoenix's sauce, who are left to be questioned over the flaws in their performance. Amongst the final three, Michael Copp is fired for mismanaging the sales team, refusing the large order they received, and for demonstrating himself to be unsuitable to proceed in the process.
102	4	"Junk Shops"	11 April 2012	8.05
Lord Sugar assigns each team to purchase a selection of second-hand furniture, and then resell them for a higher price in their own retail space within London's East End. Phoenix focus on a strategy of keeping costs low and buying quality pieces, managing good sales throughout the task despite leaving their shop space quite sparse with this tactic. Sterling opt for a strategy of buying in bulk and customising their purchases before selling them, yet their good income from this decision is countered by high expenditures from the customisation work. In the boardroom, Phoenix's strategy proves highly successful, leaving Sterling to be questioned over the flawed tactics behind their performance. Amongst the final three, Jane McEvoy is dismissed for her weak sales and her poor track record, despite Lord Sugar having approved of her CV being the strongest amongst the other candidates.
103	5	"Keep Fit"	18 April 2012	7.24
Creating a brand new workout program, complete with promotional material, is the next challenge for teams, with each pitching their creation to a selection of gym chains. Phoenix focus on a program involving 1980s toys, receiving praise over their promo video, yet face difficulty in making orders due to questions over the storage of their program's accessories and its overall cost. Sterling focus on a program combining dancing and martial arts, providing good pitches and making reasonable sales, yet face criticism towards the marketing message of their promo video. In the end, Phoenix secure victory after receiving a large order from one gym chain, surpassing the total amount made by Sterling and leaving them to face scrutiny over their work. Amongst the final three, Duane Bryan is ejected from the process after being deemed responsible for his team's loss with the poor promotional video he created for them.
104	6	"Street Food"	25 April 2012	7.62
Heading to Edinburgh, each team is tasked with making quality street-side meals and selling their concoctions to hungry customers around the city. Phoenix opt for creating Italian meatball dishes with low-quality ingredients, but struggle to make sales, despite taking advantage of a football match to attract custom, due to overpricing their meals and making a deal that fails to provide sufficient customers. Sterling opt for creating Scottish beef casseroles with high-quality ingredients, performing efficiently on the task and making reasonable sales, despite initially choosing a poor marketing location that provides few consumers to sell to. Phoenix soon face questions over ignoring the task's criteria with their performance, after Sterling is commended for the profit they make. Amongst the losing team, Katie Wright finds herself being fired for the overpricing blunder, her poor marketing skills and her overall track record in the process.
105	7	"Flip it in Essex"	2 May 2012	7.14
Reinvesting in products that sell is the basis of the next task, as each team receives £150 from Lord Sugar to build up assets from buying and selling in Essex. Phoenix opt for selling a broad range of goods, yet lack a proper strategy because of their choices, with their performance hindered by the team leader reinvesting in the same goods and going on a fire sale before the task's deadline, reducing the amount of assets made. Sterling opt for selling a range of cosmetic products, reinvesting in fake tan sprayers that prove good sellers for the team and bring in a healthy amount of assets, despite delays by heavy traffic affecting their ability to sell at times. Sterling achieve victory with their performance, leaving Phoenix to be questioned over the mistakes they made. Amongst the losing team, despite their leader facing criticism over their management skills, Azhar Siddique is dismissed for his lack of contributions, poor communication within the team, and for failing to provide alternative solutions when criticising his leader's decisions.
106	8	"Street Art"	9 May 2012	6.96
Each team must represent an up-and-coming urban artist, holding an exhibition of their work and make commissions through the sale of their pieces to visitors and corporate clients. Sterling display strong enthusiasm that impresses the artist they choose to represent, managing good sales of their work despite certain members displaying a lack of salesmanship during their exhibition. Phoenix find themselves struggling to make any sales with the artist they choose to represent, thanks in part to their leader choosing them, despite managing to secure a second artist whose work is more appealing to visitors of their exhibition. Sterling secure a significant victory with the commissions they make, leaving Phoenix to face questions over what caused their loss. Amongst the losing team, Laura Hogg is fired for poor sales skills, providing an unconvincing argument for her survival in the process, and her inconsistent track record in tasks.
107	9	"English Bubbles"	16 May 2012	7.13
Teams find themselves tasked with providing a new brand identity for English sparkling wine, each creating their brand with a video advert and website, and pitching their concept to industry experts. Phoenix opt for a simple brand identity, but face issues with their concept due to their strong and informative advert featuring considerable mistakes, with the experts criticising their website for being poorly designed and targeting existing customers only. Sterling opt for a stylish brand identity, receiving praise for their clever website design and excellent pitch, but are criticised for their badly made advert. Based on the feedback from the experts, Lord Sugar deems Phoenix's brand design the winner, leaving Sterling to face questions over the critical flaw in their concept. Of the final three, Jenna Whittingham is ejected from the process after being deemed responsible for her team's loss through producing the poorly received advert.
108	10	"Discount Dealing"	23 May 2012	7.23
Each team faces the task of assisting a discount website in creating new offers, negotiating with high-end business and services to create exclusive bargains that will be attractive to potential customers. Phoenix focus on a measured approach with negotiations, achieving a reasonable amount of deals, despite the team leader struggling on making appointments and being less prepared in one of the meetings. Sterling focus on a strategy of acquiring multiple discounts from each of their meetings, getting many deals despite members targeting business not meeting the task's specifications and wasting time with a restaurant that would not offer any discounts they negotiated for. Of the deals accepted by the website, Phoenix's prove more valuable, leaving Sterling to face questions over their performance after losing the task. Amongst the losing team, Gabrielle Omar is fired for her low contributions and having lost her business passion in recent tasks, while Stephen Brady is fired for the team's flawed strategy and the other mistakes he made.
109	SP–1	"The Final Five"	29 May 2012	N/A
As this year's series of The Apprentice draws closer to its finale, this special episode takes a look at profiling the true story behind the five remaining candidates. Discussing their backgrounds, experiences, personality, and strengths and weaknesses, are a selection of each candidate's friends, family and colleagues, as well as Lord Sugar's aides, Nick Hewer and Karren Brady.
110	11	"Affordable Luxury"	30 May 2012	7.23
In their penultimate task, teams find themselves each creating a brand new luxury product, complete with its own retail space, and pitching their ideas to industry experts. Sterling opt for creating a line of male grooming products, receiving praise for their presentation and the long-term plan of their range, but face concerns over the unappealing design of their retail space. Phoenix opt for creating a line of alcoholic sweets and high quality chocolates, yet despite being complimented for producing an appealing retail space design, their concept raises question over their pricing strategy, with their presentation hampered by a poorly focused pitcher. Feedback from the experts leads to Sterling's concept being deemed the winner, leaving Phoenix to argue amongst themselves over who is at fault for their loss. Amongst the losing team, Adam Corbally is dismissed for being responsible for his team's poor presentation, along with demonstrating no leadership skills and his overall weak track record throughout the process.
111	SP–2	"Why I Fired Them"	2 June 2012	N/A
As the final looms, Lord Sugar takes a look back to the tasks he set for this year's series of The Apprentice. From designing new condiments and workout programs, to selling urban art and re-branding English sparkling wine, he relives all of the mistakes, doomed decisions, and other notable events that occurred during the process, and provides his reasons behind each firing he made amongst the candidates for the process, which ultimately whittle them down to the two finalists for this series.
112	12	"The Final"	3 June 2012	6.99
After facing tasks as teams, the four finalists now face their final task as individuals – a series of tough, gruelling interviews with four of Lord Sugar's most trusted associates to determine who is worthy of investment. Each member faces scrutiny over their backgrounds, work experience, track record, and business proposals when questioned by interviewers. Feedback to Lord Sugar, alongside observations by his aides, leads to him dismissing Jade Nash for raising concerns over the required investment needed for her proposal, and Nick Holzherr for offering a questionable proposal and not disclosing details on his own thriving business. Of the remaining two, Ricky Martin becomes Lord Sugar's next business partner for 2012 due to his established track record in the recruitment industry and his focused business plan, leaving Tom Gearing to finish as runner-up due to his comparative inexperience and the unappealing high costs of his proposal. Notes: This episode was originally broadcast as part of a two-hour crossover special with the programme's sister show, You're Fired. After the crossover special, this episode was broadcast separately in subsequent repeats.

== Ratings ==
Official episode viewing figures are from BARB.

Episode no.	Airdate	Viewers (millions)	BBC One weekly ranking
1	21 March 2012	7.61	6
2	28 March 2012	7.51	7
3	4 April 2012	7.46	5
4	11 April 2012	8.05	6
5	18 April 2012	7.24	7
6	25 April 2012	7.62	7
7	2 May 2012	7.14	7
8	9 May 2012	6.96	2
9	16 May 2012	7.13	5
10	23 May 2012	7.23	3
11	30 May 2012	7.23	8
12	3 June 2012	6.99	9

Specials

Episode	Airdate	Viewers (millions)	BBC One weekly ranking
The Final Five	29 May 2012	—N/a	—N/a
Why I Fired Them	2 June 2012	—N/a	—N/a
