= The Apprentice (British TV series) series 9 =

Ninth season of UK television series

The Apprentice
- Series 9
- Promo group shot of Alan Sugar, Nick Hewer and Karren Brady standing before the candidates for series 9
- Starring: Alan Sugar; Nick Hewer; Karren Brady
- No. of episodes: 14

Release
- Original network: BBC One
- Original release: 7 May – 17 July 2013

Series chronology
- ← Previous; Series 8 Next → Series 10

The ninth series of British reality television series The Apprentice was broadcast in the UK on BBC One, from 7 May to 17 July 2013. This series saw the format return to having a business task as the final task, rather than simply concluding the series at the Interview stage. Alongside the standard twelve episodes, with the first two aired on consecutive days, two specials were aired alongside this series – "The Final Five" on 8 July, and "Why I Fired Them" on 11 July.

Sixteen candidates took part in the ninth series, with Leah Totton becoming the overall winner. Excluding specials, the series averaged around 7.34 million viewers during its broadcast.

== Series overview ==
Applications for the ninth series opened in spring 2012, with the selection process of auditions, assessments and interviews held throughout the midsummer of that year, with filming beginning in October 2012. In contrast to series 7 and 8, this series returned to the original format, whereby the two finalists partook in a business venture as part of the final task, rather than the series concluding at the Interview stage. In addition, Sugar brought back the use of exotic filming locations, with the Great Recession coming to an end. Alongside these changes, Matthew Riley left the programme after two series as an interviewer, being succeeded by Claudine Collins.

This series' teams were named Evolve and Endeavour. Of those who took part, Leah Totton would become the eventual winner, going on to establishing cosmetic skin clinics with her investment, the first of which opened on 22 January 2014.

=== Candidates ===
Candidate	Background	Age	Result
Leah Totton	Doctor	24	Winner
Luisa Zissman	Retail Entrepreneur	25	Runner-up
Francesca MacDuff-Varley	Dance & Entertainment Entrepreneur	32	Fired after Interviews stage
Neil Clough	Regional Manager – Soccer Centres	32	Fired after Interviews stage
Jordan Poulton	Business Analyst	26	Fired after Interviews stage
Myles Mordaunt	Marketing Agency Co-Founder	39	Fired after tenth task
Alex Mills	Company Director	22	Fired after ninth task
Jason Leech	Historian / Property Entrepreneur	29	Fired after eighth task
Natalie Panayi	Recruitment Manager	30	Fired after seventh task
Kurt Wilson	Health Drink Entrepreneur and Health & Safety Manager	26	Fired after seventh task
Rebecca Slater	Pharmaceutical Sales Rep.	35	Fired after sixth task
Zeeshaan Shah	CEO of Property Investment Company	27	Fired after fifth task
Uzma Yakoob	Entrepreneur & Make-Up Brand Owner	32	Fired after fourth task
Sophie Lau	Restaurateur	22	Fired after third task
Tim Stillwell	Mexican Food Entrepreneur	23	Fired after second task
Jaz Ampaw-Farr	Literacy & Education Company Director	41	Fired after first task

=== Performance chart ===
Candidate	Task Number											
Candidate	1	2	3	4	5	6	7	8	9	10	11	12
Leah	LOSS	LOSS	LOSS	IN	BR	WIN	LOSS	IN	BR	IN	IN	HIRED
Luisa	LOSS	LOSS	LOSS	WIN	IN	BR	IN	LOSE	IN	WIN	IN	RUNNER-UP
Francesca	LOSS	BR	LOSS	IN	IN	LOSE	IN	BR	IN	IN	FIRED	
Neil	IN	IN	IN	LOSE	LOSS	IN	WIN	LOSS	WIN	BR	FIRED	
Jordan	IN	IN	WIN	IN	IN	LOSS	IN	WIN	LOSS	BR	FIRED	
Myles	IN	IN	IN	IN	WIN	IN	LOSS	IN	BR	FIRED		
Alex	IN	IN	IN	LOSS	LOSS	IN	BR	IN	FIRED			
Jason	WIN	IN	IN	IN	IN	LOSS	IN	FIRED				
Natalie	LOSS	LOSS	LOSE	LOSS	BR	IN	FIRED					
Kurt	IN	WIN	IN	BR	LOSS	IN	FIRED					
Rebecca	LOSS	BR	LOSS	IN	IN	FIRED						
Zeeshaan	IN	IN	IN	LOSS	FIRED							
Uzma	BR	LOSS	BR	FIRED								
Sophie	BR	LOSS	FIRED									
Tim	IN	FIRED										
Jaz	FIRED											

Key:

The candidate won this series of The Apprentice.
The candidate was the runner-up.
The candidate won as project manager on his/her team, for this task.
The candidate lost as project manager on his/her team, for this task.
The candidate was on the winning team for this task / they passed the Interviews stage.
The candidate was on the losing team for this task.
The candidate was brought to the final boardroom for this task.
The candidate was fired in this task.
The candidate lost as project manager for this task and was fired.

== Episodes ==
No. overall	No. in series	Title	Original release date	UK viewers (millions)
113	1	"Container"	7 May 2013	7.25
Lord Sugar begins a new search for a business partner from a pool of sixteen new candidates. In the first week, the teams are tasked with selling imported goods. The men manage reasonable sales, while the women face serious problems with organisation and a lack of sales strategy. The women lose and, of the final three, Jaz Ampaw-Farr becomes the first to be fired for her inefficient leadership.
114	2	"Beer"	8 May 2013	6.64
The teams are tasked with creating a brand new flavour of beer to sell. Endeavour opt for a chocolate orange flavour and achieve decent sales. Evolve opt for a rhubarb and caramel flavour, selling significant quantities, despite choosing a number of poor marketing locations. However, they ultimately lose and, of the final three, Tim Stillwell is fired for his weak leadership.
115	3	"Flat-Pack"	15 May 2013	7.22
The teams are tasked with creating a brand new, unique piece of flat-pack furniture, pitching their design to independent retailers. Endeavour design a chair that converts into a table, securing significant orders despite issues with mismeasurements. Evolve design a cube-shaped table with multi-functional sides and, despite a well-received pitch, the concept received few orders due to criticism over its originality and styling. Endeavour win, leaving Evolve to face questions over their flawed product. Of the final three, Sophie Lau is ejected from the process for her lack of presence, demonstrating no notable skills, and making no significant contributions on tasks.
116	4	"Farm Shop"	22 May 2013	7.69
Sent to the countryside, the teams are tasked with running their own farm shop, sourcing produce from local farms to turn into products for sale. Endeavour sell milkshakes and, while they enjoy decent sales initially, the team face issues with disorganisation. Evolve opt to sell soups, jacket potatoes and buffalo meat products, making decent sales, despite issues with budget control. In the boardroom, Evolve clinch victory and, in the losing team, Uzma Yakoob is fired her poor sales tactics.
117	5	"Dubai"	28 May 2013	6.88
Candidates are flown to Dubai to source eight items for a new multimillion-pound hotel. Evolve secure six items, while Endeavour secure four items, ultimately losing the task. Of the final three, Zeeshaan Shah is fired for his dictatorial leadership.
118	6	"Away Day"	5 June 2013	7.29
The teams are tasked with creating a corporate away day on a £5,000 budget. Endeavour lead an army-themed away day, while Evolve lead a school-themed away day. Endeavour manage a better performance, leaving Evolve to face scrutiny over their service in the boardroom. In the losing team, Rebecca Slater is fired for suggesting the ideas that contributed to the team's loss.
119	7	"Caravan"	12 June 2013	7.81
Teams head to the Motorhome & Caravan Show in Birmingham, with each selling a new form of caravan trailer alongside a line of caravan accessories to visitors at the event. Endeavour focus on selling retro-styled campers, rooftop boat boxes and hooded foldable chairs, yet their accessories prove to be less popular and thus difficult to sell, while their choice of trailer makes no sales due to a lack of interest from visitors. Evolve focus on selling collapsible campers, electric bikes and children's camping kits, managing favourable sales due to the popularity of their accessories and a strong salesperson, despite the high prices they charge. Endeavour lose the task on sales figures, after Evolve win with their choices. Amongst the losing team, Kurt Wilson is fired for his awful leadership, the choice of products, his lack of sales, and his previous performance in tasks, while Natalie Panayi is dismissed for her poor excuses, her failure to secure the popular accessories, and her unimpressive track record.
120	8	"Online Dating"	19 June 2013	7.48
Each team is tasked with creating a brand-new online dating concept, complete with TV advert, and pitching their concept to industry experts. Endeavour focus their concept at targeting young businesspeople, producing a well-received advert, despite questions being raised on the advertising's tone and the design of their dating website. Evolve focus their concept at targeting over-50s, though the team were thrown into chaos when the chosen leader dropped out of the role and left another to take it over, resulting in their creation being poorly received after the experts criticise it featuring an incomplete website, and a poorly produced advert that focused on the wrong target market. Based on feedback from the experts, Lord Sugar deems Endeavour's concept the best, leaving Evolve to face a review of their performance. Amongst the losing team, Jason Leech is fired for abdicating as the team's leader during the task, failing to show assertiveness, and for demonstrating an unsuitable personality for business.
121	9	"Ready Meal"	26 June 2013	7.30
Making a brand-new type of ready meal is the basis of the next task, with each team seeking out orders from retailers upon pitching their creation to them. Endeavour design a brand aimed at children, yet while the taste of their meal is well received, they receive few orders due to criticism over the design of their packaging being deemed inappropriate for their target market. Evolve design a brand aimed at adult and featuring a fusion of two cuisine styles, yet despite criticism over the bland taste of their meal, they secure reasonable orders due to positive feedback on the appealing concept and packaging they create. In the boardroom, Evolve win the task with the order total they achieve, leaving Endeavour to face scrutiny on the flaws of their meal concept. Amongst the final three, Alex Mills is dismissed for allowing himself to be convinced to go with a concept that was unpopular, making bad gambles, and demonstrating a lack of expertise and focus that his proposal required from him.
122	10	"Stall-to-Shop"	3 July 2013	7.53
Both teams each receive £150 to start a new business with, selling whatever products they wish to offer over two days on the advice that they reinvest profits on products that are good earners. Endeavour lack a strategy for the task, having no focus on what products to sell, gambling on a product that fails to find a buyer, and making few sales, despite making some profit on a few pieces during the first day. Evolve focus on a clear strategy of selling fashion accessories, making good sales and performing well throughout both days, with the exception of the second day when they drop prices and choose a product that fails to sell. In the boardroom, Endeavour face criticism over their performance and lack of strategy on the task, after Evolve accumulate a strong income with their sales. Although the losing team is deemed equally responsible for the loss, Myles Mordaunt is ejected from the process for his poor and indecisive leadership, his bad decisions throughout the process, and for offering an unappealing business proposal.
123	SP–1	"The Final Five"	8 July 2013	3.39
As this year's series of The Apprentice draws closer to its finale, this special episode takes a look at profiling the true story behind the five remaining candidates. Discussing their backgrounds, experiences, personality, and strengths and weaknesses, are a selection of each candidate's friends, family and colleagues, as well as Lord Sugar's aides, Nick Hewer and Karren Brady.
124	11	"Interviews"	10 July 2013	8.24
After facing ten tasks as teams, the five remaining candidates now compete as individuals in their next task – a series of tough, gruelling interviews with four of Lord Sugar's most trusted associates. Each member faces scrutiny over their backgrounds, work experience, track record, and business proposals when questioned by interviewers. Feedback to Lord Sugar, alongside observations by his aides, leads him to dismiss Jordan Poulton for offering an illegitimate proposal, Neil Clough for an unsuitable proposal, and Francesca MacDuff-Varley for offering a proposal with flaws in its financing structure. Of the remaining two, Leah Totton is praised for her academic background and business skills, despite concerns on her proposal, while Luisa Zissman is given credit for her past business success, despite issues with her proposal, behaviour and motive for the investment.
125	SP–2	"Why I Fired Them"	11 July 2013	N/A
As the final looms, Lord Sugar takes a look back to the tasks he set for this year's series of The Apprentice. From making beer and new ready meals, to bargain hunting in Dubai and selling caravans in Birmingham, he relives all of the mistakes, doomed decisions, and other notable events that occurred during the process, and provides his reasons behind each firing he made amongst the candidates for the process, which ultimately whittle them down to the two finalists for this series.
126	12	"The Final"	17 July 2013	6.74
After facing a multitude of business tasks and a tough interview, the two finalists, aided by old friends, face the task of presenting their business proposal to an audience of business and industry experts, detailing key areas in it – its name, its goals, its target market, and its business structure. Luisa works to present her plans for an online bakery trade website, which is well received, despite her not being prepared for her presentation and facing raised concerns over her target markets. Leah works to present her plans for a cosmetic surgery chain, providing a smooth presentation, but faces concerns over the brand name, her pitching style, and her target market. Based on feedback from these presentations, Lord Sugar deems that Leah Totton will be his new business partner for 2013 for providing a proposal with lucrative rewards, leaving Luisa Zissman to finish as runner-up due to giving a weaker presentation, offering unappealing profit margins, and raising concerns over how focused she would be with her proposal. Notes: This episode was originally broadcast as part of a two-hour crossover special with the programme's sister show, You're Fired. After the crossover special, this episode was broadcast separately in subsequent repeats.

== Controversy ==
Jordan Poulton's application

As part of the programme's rules, candidates are not permitted to submit business plans for a company they do not own or co-own. However, upon applying, Jordan Poulton submitted a business plan that he was not an official director of, a fact picked up on by Claude Littner during the competition's Interview stage. Furthermore, Poulton was only prepared to yield a 15.39% equity stake to Lord Sugar, which is in direct contravention to the agreed-upon 50% partnership deal. Littner was so appalled by these revelations that he terminated the interview, after deeming Poulton a "parasite". Poulton later admitted on Twitter that he had been "naive" and apologised for "wasting everyone's time".

== Ratings ==
Official episode viewing figures are from BARB.

Episode no.	Airdate	Viewers (millions)	BBC One weekly ranking
1	7 May 2013	7.25	7
2	8 May 2013	6.64	8
3	15 May 2013	7.22	4
4	22 May 2013	7.69	2
5	28 May 2013	6.88	2
6	5 June 2013	7.29	2
7	12 June 2013	7.81	3
8	19 June 2013	7.48	4
9	26 June 2013	7.30	5
10	3 July 2013	7.53	5
11	10 July 2013	8.24	1
12	17 July 2013	6.74	2

Note: During the 2-hour final, the show was shared with The Apprentice: You're Hired, and as a result the figures are lower than usual. The first hour was the main show, followed directly by the corresponding episode of You're Hired.

Specials

Episode	Airdate	Viewers (millions)	BBC One weekly ranking
The Final Five	8 July 2013	3.39	29
Why I Fired Them	11 July 2013	—N/a	—N/a
