= When I Think of You (Lee Ryan song) =

2006 single by Lee Ryan

Single by Lee Ryan

from the album Lee Ryan
- B-side: "I Can Let Go Now"
- Released: 30 January 2006
- Length: 3:05
- Label: Sony BMG
- Songwriters: Mike Hamilton, Lynn Sylvers, Bill Biddle, Alan Gowdy
- Producer: Ash Howes

Lee Ryan singles chronology
"Turn Your Car Around" (2005)	"When I Think of You" (2006)	"Real Love" (2006)

"When I Think of You" is the third single released from ex-Blue member Lee Ryan's debut solo album, Lee Ryan. The song peaked at number 15 on the UK Singles Chart.

== Track listing ==
- UK CD single
1. "When I Think Of You" - 3:05
2. "I Can Let Go Now" - 3:24

== Charts ==
Chart (2006)	Peak position
Ireland (IRMA)	29
UK Singles (OCC)	15
UK Airplay (Music Week)	11
