= Luisa Zissman =

English reality TV personality

- Born: Louisa Christinas Kalozois; 4 June 1987 (age 39); Milton Keynes, England
- Years active: 2013–present
- Television: The Apprentice (2013); Celebrity Big Brother 13 (2014)
- Spouses: Oliver Zissman (m. 2009; div. 2014) Andrew Collins (m. 2015)
- Children: 3

Luisa Christina Zissman (born Louisa Christina Kalozois; 4 June 1987) is a British retail entrepreneur and reality television personality from Milton Keynes, England. She was the runner-up on the ninth series of The Apprentice and finished fourth on Celebrity Big Brother 13. She later became a presenter and regular panellist on Big Brother's Bit on the Side. Zissman is also one half of podcast LuAnna: The Podcast with Anna Williamson.

== Early life and education ==
Zissman was born in Milton Keynes to Mr and Mrs Zo Kalozois; her father is Greek and her mother has English, German and Italian heritage. She attended the Grove Independent school in Milton Keynes and Northampton High School for Girls.

== Career ==
Zissman took her first job at an estate agent on Saturdays at 16 to pay the upkeep costs for a horse her parents bought for her. One of her first post-school jobs was at Electronic Data Systems, but she later stated that she decided to go into business because she disliked being told what to do.

Zissman had her own baking website and eBay electronics business. Her cupcake shop – Dixie's Cupcakery, named after her daughter, is now closed. Although she claimed on several occasions that these three businesses have a net worth of £1.5 million, The Independent valued the three businesses, all trading names of Boutique Trading Ltd of which Zissman is listed as director and company secretary, at £194. They also noted that the eBay electronics store she owned was a "one-stop shop for several sellers, including electronics, baking and beauty products".

Zissman came to public attention when she appeared on the ninth series of The Apprentice in 2013, where she was runner-up. On 23 July 2013, Zissman appeared on BBC Radio 1's Innuendo Bingo. In November 2013 she launched her business, named Bakers Toolkit, at the Cake International Show. Earlier, there had been some debate about whether the name should include an apostrophe. She joined the thirteenth series of Celebrity Big Brother on 3 January 2014. She finished fourth overall behind Jim Davidson, Dappy and Ollie Locke. Zissman revealed she received a six-figure sum for her stint on the show. She also regularly appears on This Morning and Good Morning Britain as a guest to debate current new stories. She has since appeared on Reality Bites, News Thing, Loose Women and Sam & Billie: The Mummy Diaries on ITVBe.

== Personal life ==
Zissman is based in Dubai.

Zissman married entrepreneur Oliver Zissman, in 2009. Zissman gave birth to her first daughter, Dixie, in 2010. Zissman and her husband divorced in 2014.

Zissman married her second husband, Irish businessman Andrew Collins, in 2015.
