= Turn Your Car Around =

2005 single by Lee Ryan

Single by Lee Ryan

from the album Lee Ryan
- B-side: "Best of You" (live); "These Words (Gold Horizons)"; "Movin' On"
- Released: 10 October 2005
- Length: 3:04
- Label: Sony BMG
- Songwriter: Ben Novak
- Producer: Ash Howes

Lee Ryan singles chronology
"Army of Lovers" (2005)	"Turn Your Car Around" (2005)	"When I Think of You" (2006)

"Turn Your Car Around" is the second single released from Blue member Lee Ryan's debut solo album, Lee Ryan. The track peaked at number 12 on the UK Singles Chart, also reaching the top 20 in several other European countries, including number two in Italy. The song was originally written and recorded by a New Zealand musician, Ben Novak, in 2004.

The music video features Ryan driving a Mustang in the desert, racing alongside a horse, getting a flat tyre, then walking off with the horse at the end.

== Track listings ==
- UK CD1 (82876 71336 2)
1. "Turn Your Car Around" – 3:04
2. "Best of You" (Radio 1 Live Lounge Session) – 2:53
- UK CD2 (82876 71336 5)
1. "Turn Your Car Around" – 3:04
2. "These Words (Gold Horizons)" – 3:14
3. "Movin' On" – 3:30
4. "Turn Your Car Around" (video) – 3:07

== Charts ==
Chart (2005)	Peak position
Austria (Ö3 Austria Top 40)	41
Belgium (Ultratop 50 Flanders)	52
Germany (GfK)	52
Ireland (IRMA)	33
Italy (FIMI)	2
Italy (Musica e dischi)	4
Scottish Singles Sales (Official Charts)	10
UK Singles (Official Charts)	12
UK Airplay (Music Week)	7
