= I Am Who I Am/Secret Love =

"I Am Who I Am / Secret Love"

Single by Lee Ryan
- Released: 4 July 2010 (UK)
- Recorded: 2008
- Genre: Pop
- Length: 3:55 (I Am Who I Am); 3:57 (Secret Love)
- Label: Geffen
- Songwriter: Lee Ryan

Lee Ryan singles chronology
"Real Love" (2006)	"I Am Who I Am" / "Secret Love" (2010)

Secret Love (Original Cover)

"I Am Who I Am" / "Secret Love" is a double A-side single by Lee Ryan. The single was Lee Ryan's first new solo material since 2007. Secret Love was initially set to be released by itself on 3 May 2010 but, after being postponed from a later release, was cancelled. However, after being packaged with a further new song, "I Am Who I Am", the single was released on 4 July 2010. "I Am Who I Am" was originally written and recorded by British indie band Ben's Brother for their 2007 album, Beta Male Fairytales. The music video for Secret Love was filmed in LA in March 2010. The video premiered in April 2010. In the UK, the single debuted at #33 in its first week and fell to #69 in its second week, making it Ryan's third consecutive single to miss the top twenty. The single spent only two weeks inside the UK Top 100 Singles Chart.

== Promotion ==
- This Morning – 22 April 2010
- G-A-Y – 1 May 2010
- Koko Pop – 1 May 2010
- Loose Women – 7 July 2010

== Track listing ==
- UK "Secret Love" CD single
1. "Secret Love" – 3:57
2. "Secret Love" (Ian Carey Remix) – 6:10
- UK "Double A-Side" CD single
1. "I Am Who I Am" – 3:55
2. "Secret Love" – 3:57
- Digital download EP #1
1. "I Am Who I Am" – 3:55
2. "Secret Love" – 3:57
3. "I Am Who I Am" (Buzz Junkies Remix) – 5:18
4. "Secret Love" (Crazy Cousinz Full Club Remix) – 7:33
- Digital download EP #2
1. "I Am Who I Am" – 3:55
2. "Secret Love" – 3:57
3. "I Am Who I Am" (Buzz Junkies Remix) – 5:18
4. "I Am Who I Am" (Alex Says Remix) – 6:53
5. "Secret Love" (Ian Carey Full Club) – 9:06

== Charts ==
Chart (2010)	Peak position
UK Singles (OCC)	33
UK Airplay (Music Week)	18
