= Zeeshaan Shah =

British-Pakistani entrepreneur

- Born: 1985 (age 40–41); Doncaster, United Kingdom
- Education: University of Nottingham
- Occupation: Entrepreneur
- Known for: Appearing on the BBC's reality business show The Apprentice

Zeeshaan Shah is a British-Pakistani entrepreneur and real estate developer known for founding the international conglomerate One Group, appearing on the BBC's reality business show The Apprentice.

== Early life and background ==
Shah was born in Doncaster, South Yorkshire, England. At eight years old, his family relocated to Karachi, Pakistan, where he spent eleven years completing his primary and secondary schooling alongside his A-Level education.

He returned to the United Kingdom to pursue a degree in Economics and Finance at the University of Nottingham but left the institution prior to graduation to initiate his first commercial business ventures.

== Career ==
=== Early property sector involvement ===
Shah initially started the real estate business as a property broker and independent investor in Dubai during the region's market expansion phase between 2006 and 2007. Following the global financial downturn of 2008, his business focus reportedly shifted toward distressed property acquisitions and commuter-belt real estate investment within the United Kingdom. He then founded One Investments, an international property advisory firm underwriting and acquiring residential assets in regional UK markets like Slough and Luton.

=== Media appearance ===
In 2013, Shah appeared as a contestant on the ninth series of the BBC competitive business reality television show, The Apprentice. Competing under the name "Zee Shah" for a £250,000 investment from business magnate Alan Sugar, he served as a project manager on multiple assignments before being eliminated by Sugar in the fifth week of the broadcast following a corporate away-day task failure.

=== One Group and real estate expansion ===
Shah consolidated and expanded his commercial operations under One Group, a multinational holding company dealing in real estate development, advisory, and venture capital, maintaining corporate workspaces in London, Dubai, Houston, and Islamabad.

Under this corporate umbrella, he launched One Homes, a property development division reportedly catering to foreign real estate investments and residential spaces focused on overseas buyers in Pakistan.

In late 2025, One Group established a real estate development subsidiary in the United Arab Emirates under the brand name Elevate, announcing a projected regional development pipeline of $1 billion.

The subsidiary's initial project is the Mondrian Al Marjan Island Beach Residences, located in Ras Al Khaimah. The development is executed via a joint-venture brand partnership with lifestyle hospitality group Ennismore and carries an estimated development value of AED 1.8 billion (approximately $500 million).

In May 2022, the Prime Minister of Pakistan appointed Shah as an international business liaison envoy to facilitate and encourage foreign direct investments into the country's economic sectors. He has additionally spoken at the UK House of Commons regarding private-sector infrastructure scaling and South Asian investment frameworks.

== Recognition ==
- International Entrepreneur of the Year (2019): Awarded at the annual Asian Business Awards in London following his cross-border co-founding of CPIC and expansion of the holding firm's operations between the UK, Middle East, and South Asia.
- Business Person of the Year (2023): Nominated as a finalist at the 21st annual Asian Achievers Awards.
- Industry Recognition (2026): Named by Construction Business News Middle East (CBNME) as one of the "Top 10 Rising Developers in the UAE".

== Affiliations and public initiatives ==
- British Asian Trust: Shah serves as a member of the Founders Circle for this international development charity, which was originally established by King Charles III to alleviate poverty and support disenfranchised communities across South Asia.
- Young Presidents' Organization (YPO): Active member of the global leadership community for chief executives.
- Changing Perceptions Initiative: An architectural public relations campaign launched by Shah aimed at structural and economic developments within Pakistan to global institutional investors.
