= Ice Age: The Meltdown =

2006 American animated film

- Theatrical release poster
- Directed by: Carlos Saldanha
- Screenplay by: Peter Gaulke; Gerry Swallow; Jim Hecht
- Story by: Peter Gaulke; Gerry Swallow
- Produced by: Lori Forte
- Starring: Ray Romano; John Leguizamo; Denis Leary; Seann William Scott; Josh Peck; Queen Latifah
- Edited by: Harry Hitner
- Music by: John Powell
- Production companies: 20th Century Fox Animation; Blue Sky Studios
- Distributed by: 20th Century Fox
- Release dates: March 19, 2006 (Grauman's Chinese Theatre); March 31, 2006 (United States)
- Running time: 90 minutes
- Country: United States
- Language: English
- Budget: $80 million
- Box office: $667 million

Ice Age: The Meltdown is a 2006 American animated adventure comedy film directed by Carlos Saldanha and written by Peter Gaulke, Gerry Swallow, and Jim Hecht. Produced by 20th Century Fox Animation and Blue Sky Studios, it is the second installment in the Ice Age film series following Ice Age (2002). Ray Romano, John Leguizamo, Denis Leary, and Chris Wedge reprise their roles from the first film, with Seann William Scott, Josh Peck, and Queen Latifah joining the voice cast. In the film, Manny, Sid, and Diego attempt to escape an impending flood, during which Manny finds love.

Ice Age: The Meltdown premiered on March 19, 2006, at Grauman's Chinese Theater in Hollywood, and was released in the United States on March 31, by 20th Century Fox. The film received mixed reviews from critics, and grossed $667 million, becoming the third highest-grossing film of 2006. A sequel, Dawn of the Dinosaurs, released in 2009.

== Plot ==
Sometime after the events of the first film, Manny, Sid, and Diego live in a valley that is surrounded by a high ice wall on all sides and is inhabited by many other mammals. The trio discovers that the ice wall is actually a dam that is barely holding a reservoir that could flood the valley if it fails. A vulture named The Lone Gunslinger tells them that there is a boat at the other end of the valley that may save them, but they must reach it in three days. A chunk of ice breaks off from the top of the dam, initiating their immediate evacuation. Manny is also struggling with the thought of possibly being the last mammoth alive.

Meanwhile, Cretaceous, a purple Metriorhynchus, and Maelstrom, a dark green Globidens—both frozen since the Mesozoic era escape due to melting ice and seek to eat all the mammals they can during the flood. On their journey to the boat, the trio meet Ellie, a mammoth who, due to being raised by a family of opossums, believes herself to be one. Sid invites Ellie alongside her adoptive brothers, Crash and Eddie, to join their journey to the boat, and they accept.

Following a risky encounter with Cretaceous and Maelstrom while crossing a pond, Ellie realizes she is a mammoth after remembering that as an orphaned calf, she was adopted by Crash and Eddie's mother. Manny begins to fall in love with her, but denies his feelings at first because he feels like he is replacing his deceased wife and child. Ellie also distances herself from Manny when he suggests "saving their species", taking it as an offense. They later reconcile.

The herd reaches the boat but it is behind a field of hot geysers. Manny, Sid, and Diego separate from Ellie, Crash, and Eddie when the two mammoths argue about which route is safest. Just as Manny, Sid, and Diego bypass the geysers, the ice dam fails, unleashing a flood upon the valley. Ellie, Crash, and Eddie, who took the safer yet longer way, are trapped inside a cave due to falling rocks. Crash and Eddie escape through a small hole and warn Manny, who rushes back to save Ellie. Cretaceous and Maelstorm ambush Manny underwater, but he tricks them into dislodging a boulder, thus freeing Ellie and causing the boulder to crush the two predators.

Manny and Ellie reunite with the others atop a boulder, but the water is still rising. Meanwhile, Scrat, after a series of misadventures to get back his acorn, climbs the adjacent glacial wall beside them and inadvertently creates a long crack when he punctures the ice. The crack widens into a gigantic fissure which splits open the wall and drains the floodwaters, saving everyone; in the process, Scrat falls within the fissure and is washed away.

A group of mammoths later appear from the fissure, proving to everyone that mammoths are not extinct. Manny initially lets Ellie go with the mammoth herd, but after some encouragement from Sid and Diego to move on from his past, he catches up to her, expressing his desire to stay with her. Manny, Sid, Diego, Ellie, Crash, and Eddie then venture out of the valley.

After falling into the fissure and nearly drowning, Scrat has a near death experience, entering a heaven full of acorns. Suddenly, he finds himself being "sucked back" just as he is about to reach a gigantic acorn. Scrat then discovers that he has been resuscitated by Sid. Scrat is enraged, believing that Sid stole his acorn, and proceeds to viciously attack him.

== Voice cast ==
- Ray Romano as Manny, the woolly mammoth.
- Queen Latifah as Ellie, the woolly mammoth, who is under the delusion that she is a possum.
- John Leguizamo as Sid, the ground sloth.
- Denis Leary as Diego, the smilodon.
- Seann William Scott and Josh Peck as Crash and Eddie, the opossums, respectively.
- Will Arnett as Lone Gunslinger Vulture
- Jay Leno as Fast Tony, a giant armadillo.
- Chris Wedge as Scrat, the sabre-toothed squirrel.
- Tom Fahn as Stu, a Glyptodon who was eaten by Cretaceous and Maelstrom.
- Joe Bologna as Mr. Start, a Palaeotherium
- Renée Taylor as Mrs. Start, a Palaeotherium
- Alex Sullivan as James, the aardvark.
- Alan Tudyk as Cholly, the chalicothere.
- Clea Lewis as Female Mini Sloth / Dung Beetle Mom
- Debi Derryberry as Gastornis Mom
- Cindy Slattery as Aardvark Mom

== Production ==
After the release of Ice Age in March 2002, executive producer Chris Meledandri commented on the potential Ice Age sequel: "The success of Ice Age is something that gives us additional momentum. It's too early to say, but it's certainly something we'll explore." By June 2002, Blue Sky Studios was already working on the sequel. In 2003, Lori Forte, the producer of the first film, signed a multi-year deal with Fox Feature Films to develop and produce animated films, including a potential Ice Age sequel. During an interview with Denis Leary in July 2003, he said that he had expressed hope to reprise his role as Diego in the sequel: "I think there's a story – the people at Fox are working on one right now. I think they're talking about going back into the studios something around late Fall." In that same year, 2006 was reported as the planned release year, and by August 2004, its final release date, March 31, 2006, had been set.

Initially developed under the working title of Ice Age 2, it was renamed by June 2005 to Ice Age 2: The Meltdown, but for the film's final release in March 2006, the creators decided to remove the number 2, calling it Ice Age: The Meltdown. However, in the United Kingdom, Ireland, Mexico, and Australia, its title is promoted as Ice Age 2: The Meltdown. Also, most of the sponsors of the film had the 2 in their packaging after the name change (they however did edit the 2 out of their TV ads).

Carlos Saldanha, the director of the film, strove to make the characters' eyes appear alive and not mechanical. "You want the facial expressions to work. I wanted it to be so that if you looked into their eyes, you would know what they were thinking." in his own words. The characters, despite being from the last movie, were remodeled for the sequel.

== Soundtrack ==
The score is by John Powell; the soundtrack also features the song "Food Glorious Food" from the musical and film Oliver!. Powell composed brand new music for the film that replaced the theme songs from the previous film. Aram Khachaturian's Adagio from Spartacus is featured during Scrat's Heavenly vision. The track was released as a record, titled Ice Age: The Meltdown on March 28, 2006, by Varèse Sarabande Records. For the Flemish version of the film, the song ''The Other Side'' by X!NK is featured. The UK version has Real Love by Lee Ryan. The Japanese version has "ICE AGE ~Hyougaki no Kodomo-tachi~" by Kaori Kishitani.

== Release ==
Ice Age: The Meltdown had its world premiere on March 19, 2006, at the Mann's Grauman Chinese Theater in Los Angeles, California. The film was re-released in 3D on October 13, 2014, in China only.

=== Marketing ===
Its first teaser, along with the final trailer for Star Wars: Episode III – Revenge of the Sith, debuted in theatrical prints of Robots. Three fast food chains—Burger King and both CKE Restaurants-owned Carl's Jr. and Hardee's—also promoted the film with their respective selection of toys.

On Family Guy's episode "Sibling Rivalry", Scrat is shown trying to take three nuts out of the side of a glacier; Peter shows up and tries to stop him, admonishing the squirrel for stealing, which drives Scrat to subsequently attack Peter. The scene was rendered in 3D (Family Guy is normally drawn in 2D), and Scrat was voiced by Chris Wedge who voices him in the films. The Fox network aired promotions for the film throughout the evening. During the same evening of this cameo, Sid was hosting the entire Fox line-up (such as King of the Hill, Malcolm in the Middle, The War at Home, Arrested Development, The Simpsons, Family Guy, American Dad!, The O.C., House, Bones, 24, and That '70s Show, among others), as well as other shows produced by Fox's own TV production and syndication arm (such as Futurama, My Name is Earl, Yes, Dear, Boston Legal, The Shield, Nip/Tuck, It's Always Sunny in Philadelphia, Firefly, and Buffy the Vampire Slayer, among others), showing up in intermittent times between commercials. Re-edited scenes of Ice Age: The Meltdown were shown in Airhead candy commercials on several kids' channels and programs, such as the Disney Channel, Nickelodeon, ABC Kids on ABC, and more. It shows, in part, that after Scrat defeats a school of piranhas, he proudly displays an Airhead packet (replaced by an acorn in the actual film), when suddenly an eagle comes over and swipes it from him. The NBA and Turner-owned TNT also promoted the film heavily during NBA on TNT's on-air coverage of 2006 All-Star Game where Sid is seen playing with several basketball teams.

As an additional marketing ploy a special "anti-cell" spot was created with Sid complaining to the audience about a ringing cellular phone. For one of the posters for the film was a parody of Apple's iPod advertisement, with "iAge" replacing "iPod" and an acorn replacing an iPod.

=== Home media ===
Ice Age: The Meltdown was released on Blu-ray Disc and DVD in North America on November 21, 2006, according to the official web store. They were released in the UK on October 23, 2006, and both include a new Scrat short, No Time for Nuts.

== Reception ==
=== Box office ===
The film exceeded expectations by opening with $68,033,544 in its first weekend. This was the second biggest opening for a non-summer, non-holiday release, after the $83,848,082 of The Passion of the Christ. The film set a record for the highest-grossing opening weekend in March, which lasted a year till it was surpassed by the $70,885,301 weekend of 300. The film grossed a total of $195,330,621 at United States and Canadian box offices, making it the first film in 2006 to pass the $100 million mark. The film has grossed $667,094,506 worldwide and it is the 66th highest-grossing film of all time. Ice Age: The Meltdown was the highest grossing animated film worldwide of 2006, but lost to Cars for being the highest grossing animated film in North America.

Chris Meledandri, then president of 20th Century Fox Animation, credited the film's successful performance to the studio's strength in global marketing and distribution, the diversity of the crew, and Saldanha's method of using images rather than words to solve creative problems. Meledandri cited the success of Saldanha's model as a main factor in his decision to leave Fox and found Illumination Entertainment at Universal Pictures the following year.

=== Critical reception ===
Ice Age: The Meltdown received mixed reviews, with Rotten Tomatoes giving the film a "rotten" rating, with 56% of reviews positive. The consensus statement reads: "Despite its impressive animation and the hilarious antics of the saber-toothed squirrel Scrat, Ice Age 2: The Meltdown comes up short on the storytelling front." Another review aggregator, Metacritic, calculated a score of 59, placing it at the high end of the site's "mixed or average" reviews category.

Neil Smith, writing for the BBC, gave the film four stars out of five, declaring it as "an improvement on the original", and praising the film's greater focus on Scrat and its environmentalist themes. Caroline Westbrook, writing in Empire magazine, gave the film three stars out of five, declaring that it had "plenty of laughs", but critiquing its plot as badly put together. Roger Ebert gave the film two-and-a-half stars out of four, stating "the first Ice Age movie more or less exhausted these characters and their world, and the meltdown doesn't add much." Kimberly Jones of the Austin Chronicle gave the film two stars out of five, calling it a "watered-down likeness" of the first film that lacked its "geniality", and critiquing its third act as "too scary".

Film critics generally agreed that the scenes focusing on the character of Scrat were the most entertaining parts of the movie, with Smith and Philip French of The Guardian both expressing this view.

CinemaScore polls conducted during the opening weekend, cinema audiences gave The Meltdown an average grade of "A" on an A+ to F scale.

== Analysis ==
In an analysis of environmentalist themes in the film, Ellen E. Moore, a lecturer at the University of Washington Tacoma, found that while the film presents climate change as a serious issue that threatens the main characters, the film's vagueness around what is causing this undermines the scientific consensus that humans are causing climate change. Moore also found that the story contains numerous references to the biblical narrative of Noah's Ark, citing as evidence for this connection the fact that the animals largely travel either as pairs or as couples with children to the boat that is to save them. Moore ties these religious themes into what she perceives as the film's refusal to fully back anthropogenic climate change.

== Video game ==
A tie-in video game was published by Vivendi Universal Games.

== Sequels ==
The third Ice Age film, Ice Age: Dawn of the Dinosaurs was released on July 1, 2009, while the fourth film, Ice Age: Continental Drift, was released on July 13, 2012, the fifth film, Ice Age: Collision Course, was released on July 22, 2016, and the spin-off film, The Ice Age Adventures of Buck Wild, was released on January 14, 2022. The sixth film, Ice Age: Boiling Point, is currently set for release on February 5, 2027.

== See also ==
- List of animated feature-length films
- List of computer-animated films
