= Army of Lovers (song) =

2005 single by Lee Ryan

Single by Lee Ryan

from the album Lee Ryan
- B-side: Album sampler ("Real Love" / "When I Think of You" / "Parking")
- Released: 18 July 2005
- Length: 2:54
- Label: Sony BMG, Brightside
- Songwriter: Nigel George Hoyle
- Producer: Ash Howes

Lee Ryan singles chronology
"Army of Lovers" (2005)	"Turn Your Car Around" (2005)

"Army of Lovers" is the debut single of Blue member Lee Ryan, released from his debut solo album, Lee Ryan (2005), on 18 July 2005. The song peaked at number three on the UK Singles Chart and achieved success worldwide, reaching number one in Italy and staying there for four weeks. It sold 20,000 copies in Italy during 2005.

== Track listings ==
UK CD single 1 (82876713172)

1. "Army of Lovers"
2. "Army of Lovers" (acoustic version)

UK CD single 2 (82876726562)

1. "Army of Lovers"4
2. Album sampler ("Real Love" / "When I Think of You" / "Parking")
3. "Army of Lovers" (video) – 3:00

Digital download

1. "Army of Lovers" – 2:54
2. "Army of Lovers" (acoustic version) – 2:55

== Charts ==
=== Weekly charts ===
Chart (2005)	Peak position
Austria (Ö3 Austria Top 40)	41
Belgium (Ultratop 50 Flanders)	27
Belgium (Ultratip Bubbling Under Wallonia)	9
Europe (Eurochart Hot 100)	12
Germany (GfK)	29
Ireland (IRMA)	17
Italy (FIMI)	1
Italy (Musica e dischi)	1
Scottish Singles Sales (Official Charts)	2
Switzerland (Schweizer Hitparade)	49
UK Singles (Official Charts)	3
UK Airplay (Music Week)	13

=== Year-end charts ===
Chart (2005)	Position
Italy (FIMI)	19
UK Singles (OCC)	96

Chart (2006)	Position
Taiwan (Hito Radio)	77
