= Dancing with the Stars (Irish TV series) series 9 =

Dancing with the Stars
- Series 9
- Presented by: Jennifer Zamparelli; Laura Fox
- Judges: Arthur Gourounlian; Oti Mabuse; Brian Redmond; Karen Byrne; Nicky Byrne (guest)
- Celebrity winner: Katelyn Cummins
- Professional winner: Leonardo Lini

Release
- Original network: RTÉ One
- Original release: 4 January – 15 March 2026

Series chronology
- ← Previous; Series 8

Dancing with the Stars returned for its ninth series, starting on 4 January 2026 on RTÉ One.

On 25 September 2025, the head judge, Loraine Barry announced her departure from the series after eight years on the panel.

On 1 October 2025, RTÉ confirmed that the show would return for its ninth series, with former Strictly Come Dancing professional, Oti Mabuse taking over the role as head judge. It was confirmed that Brian Redmond, Arthur Gourounlian and Karen Byrne would join Mabuse on the panel for their ninth, fifth and second seasons, respectively. Host Jennifer Zamparelli was also announced to return for her seventh season with RTÉ 2fm presenter and Season 7 runner-up, Laura Fox filling in for Doireann Garrihy while she is on maternity leave.

On 23 November the professional dancer line-up was confirmed with Robert Rowiński, Stephen Vincent, Laura Nolan, Ervinas Merfeldas, Alex Vladimirov, Daniela Roze, Maciej Zieba and Rebecca Scott all returning from the previous season. Denys Samson, Salome Chachua and Simone Arena announced that they would not return to the series. They would be replaced by Arianna Favaro, James Cutler and Leonardo Lini. Kylee Vincent would also return to the show having taken the previous season off to give birth.

On 20 February 2026, it was announced that former host Nicky Byrne would return to the show for the 100th Episode Special as a guest judge.

Katelyn Cummins and Leonardo Lini were announced as the winners after the final on 15 March 2026, while Eric Roberts and Arianna Favaro, Paudie Moloney and Laura Nolan, and Tolü Makay and Maciej Zieba were the runners up.

== Couples ==
On 7 December 2025, singer and Eurovision winner Niamh Kavanagh was announced as the first contestant to take part.

Celebrity	Known for	Professional	Status
Michael Fry	Comedian & actor	Kylee Vincent	Eliminated 1st on 11 January 2026
Brian Kennedy	Singer-songwriter	James Cutler	Eliminated 2nd on 18 January 2026
Amber Wilson	Podcaster	Alex Vladimirov	Eliminated 3rd on 25 January 2026
Anne Cassin	Nationwide presenter	Robert Rowiński	Eliminated 4th on 8 February 2026
Niamh Kavanagh	Singer & Eurovision winner	Stephen Vincent	Eliminated 5th on 15 February 2026
Stephanie Kelly	Fair City actress	Ervinas Merfeldas	Eliminated 6th on 22 February 2026
Philip Doyle	Olympic rower	Daniela Roze	Eliminated 7th on 1 March 2026
Jordan Dargan	The Apprentice star	Rebecca Scott	Eliminated 8th on 8 March 2026
Tolü Makay	Singer-songwriter	Maciej Zieba	Runners-up on 15 March 2026
Paudie Moloney	The Traitors star	Laura Nolan	Runners-up on 15 March 2026
Eric Roberts	Ireland AM presenter	Arianna Favaro	Runners-up on 15 March 2026
Katelyn Cummins	The Rose of Tralee	Leonardo Lini	Winners on 15 March 2026

== Scoring chart ==
Couple	Place	1	2	1+2	3	4	5	6	7	8	9	10	11
Katelyn & Leonardo	1	31	28	59	35	30	35	34	39+39=78	50	35+3=38	40+38=78	40+40=80
Eric & Arianna	2	29	22	51	31	31	34	39	32+33=65	46	37+6=43	39+40=79	40+40=80
Paudie & Laura	2	13	23	36	16	23	11	23	22+33=55	25	24+1=25	26+24=50	28+29=57
Tolü & Maciej	2	27	32	59	26	33	32	37	36+39=75	49	40+2=42	36+35=71	40+37=77
Jordan & Rebecca	5	28	25	53	34	34	39	28	35+33=68	43	37+5=42	38+39=77	
Philip & Daniela	6	22	31	53	29	33	19	33	35+33=68	48	31+4=35		
Stephanie & Ervinas	7	19	19	38	27	27	30	26	31+39=70	34			
Niamh & Stephen	8	17	28	45	23	16	30	31	27+39=66				
Anne & Robert	9	23	18	41	18	24	25	14					
Amber & Alex	10	14	24	38	22	19							
Brian & James	11	23	13	36	15								
Michael & Kylee	12	21	23	44									

Red numbers indicate the couples with the lowest score for each week.
Green numbers indicate the couples with the highest score for each week.
the couple eliminated that week
the returning couple that was called forward and eventually last to be called safe, but was not necessarily in the bottom
the returning couple that finished in the bottom two and competed in the Dance-Off
the winning couple
the two/three runners-up
the couple was immune from elimination
"—" indicates the couple(s) did not dance that week

=== Average chart ===
This table only counts for dances scored on a traditional 40-points scale. It does not include the Marathon, Team Dance, or Guest Judge scores.

Rank by average	Place	Couple	Total points	Number of dances	Total average
1	1	Katelyn & Leonardo	465	13	35.8
2	2	Eric & Arianna	450	13	34.6
2	2	Tolü & Maciej	450	13	34.6
4	5	Jordan & Rebecca	372	11	33.8
5	6	Philip & Daniela	271	9	30.1
6	7	Stephanie & Ervinas	205	8	25.6
7	8	Niamh & Stephen	172	7	24.6
8	12	Michael & Kylee	44	2	22.0
9	2	Paudie & Laura	280	13	21.5
10	9	Anne & Robert	122	6	20.3
11	10	Amber & Alex	79	4	19.8
12	11	Brian & James	51	3	17.0

== Highest and lowest scoring performances ==
The highest and lowest performances in each dance according to the judges' scale are as follows.

Dance	Celebrity	Highest score	Celebrity	Lowest score
Tango	Tolü Makay	39	Paudie Moloney	22
Cha-cha-cha	Jordan Dargan	38	Paudie Moloney; Brian Kennedy	13
Salsa	Eric Roberts	39	Niamh Kavanagh	17
Foxtrot	Tolü Makay	32	Eric Roberts	22
Charleston	Tolü Makay; Katelyn Cummins; Eric Roberts	40	Paudie Moloney	16
Waltz	Paudie Moloney	23	Philip Doyle	22
Quickstep	Eric Roberts	40	Michael Fry	21
Jive	Jordan Dargan; Tolü Makay	35	Paudie Moloney	11
Rumba	Katelyn Cummins	39	Tolü Makay	33
Paso Doble	Eric Roberts; Tolü Makay	36	Brian Kennedy	15
American Smooth	Tolü Makay; Katelyn Cummins	40	Stephanie Kelly; Amber Wilson	19
Contemporary Ballroom	Philip Doyle	38	Amber Wilson	22
Samba	Katelyn Cummins	38	Philip Doyle	19
Viennese Waltz	Katelyn Cummins	40	Brian Kennedy	23
Showdance	Eric Roberts; Katelyn Cummins	40	Paudie Moloney	29
Team Dance	Katelyn Cummins; Tolü Makay; Stephanie Kelly; Niamh Kavanagh	39	Eric Roberts; Philip Doyle; Jordan Dargan; Paudie Moloney	33
Marathon	Eric Roberts	6	Paudie Moloney	1

== Couples' highest and lowest scoring dances ==
Scores out of 50 were converted to the traditional 40-point scale.

Couple	Highest scoring dance	Lowest scoring dance
Katelyn & Leonardo	Viennese Waltz, Charleston, American Smooth & Showdance (40)	Jive (28)
Eric & Arianna	Quickstep, Charleston & Showdance (40)	Foxtrot (22)
Paudie & Laura	Showdance (29)	Jive (11)
Tolü & Maciej	Charleston & American Smooth (40)	Cha-cha-cha (26)
Jordan & Rebecca	American Smooth & Charleston (39)	Viennese Waltz (25)
Philip & Daniela	Contemporary Ballroom (38)	Samba (19)
Stephanie & Ervinas	Viennese Waltz (31)	American Smooth & Cha-cha-cha (19)
Niamh & Stephen	Paso Doble (31)	Cha-cha-cha (16)
Anne & Robert	American Smooth (25)	Jive (14)
Amber & Alex	Tango (24)	Cha-cha-cha (14)
Brian & James	Viennese Waltz (23)	Cha-cha-cha (13)
Michael & Kylee	Samba (23)	Quickstep (21)

== Weekly scores and songs ==
Unless indicated otherwise, individual judges scores in the charts below (given in parentheses) are listed in this order from left to right: Brian Redmond, Karen Byrne, Oti Mabuse, Arthur Gourounlian.

=== Week 1 ===
Running order

Couple	Score	Dance	Music
Niamh & Stephen	17 (3, 5, 4, 5)	Salsa	"1–2–3" – Gloria Estefan and Miami Sound Machine
Philip & Daniela	22 (5, 6, 5, 6)	Waltz	"Love is On the Way" – Billy Porter
Amber & Alex	14 (3, 4, 3, 4)	Cha-cha-cha	"Woman's World" – Katy Perry
Michael & Kylee	21 (5, 6, 5, 5)	Quickstep	"Goodbye Mr A" – The Hoosiers
Anne & Robert	23 (6, 6, 5, 6)	Foxtrot	"I Wanna Be Loved by You" – Sinéad O'Connor
Jordan & Rebecca	28 (6, 7, 7, 8)	Salsa	"Desire" – Years & Years
Brian & James	23 (5, 6, 6, 6)	Viennese Waltz	"Piano Man" – Billy Joel
Tolü & Maciej	27 (6, 7, 7, 7)	Samba	"Hello" – Sigala x Leigh-Anne x Jonita
Stephanie & Ervinas	19 (4, 5, 5, 5)	American Smooth	"Please Please Please" – Sabrina Carpenter
Eric & Arianna	29 (6, 7, 8, 8)	Jive	"Shake a Tail Feather" – The Blues Brothers and Ray Charles
Katelyn & Leonardo	31 (7, 8, 8, 8)	Tango	"The Fate of Ophelia" – Taylor Swift
Paudie & Laura	13 (2, 4, 3, 4)	Cha-cha-cha	"A Little Less Conversation" – Elvis Presley vs. JXL

=== Week 2 ===
Running order

Couple	Score	Dance	Music	Result
Katelyn & Leonardo	28 (6, 7, 7, 8)	Jive	"APT." – Rosé and Bruno Mars	Safe
Jordan & Rebecca	25 (5, 7, 6, 7)	Viennese Waltz	"Diamonds & Roses" – Kingfishr	Safe
Anne & Robert	18 (4, 5, 4, 5)	Paso Doble	"The 5th" – David Garrett	Safe
Stephanie & Ervinas	19 (4, 5, 5, 5)	Cha-cha-cha	"I'm a Slave 4 U" – Britney Spears	Safe
Eric & Arianna	22 (6, 6, 5, 5)	Foxtrot	"Daisies" – Justin Bieber	Safe
Michael & Kylee	23 (4, 6, 7, 6)	Samba	"Sapphire" – Ed Sheeran	Eliminated
Brian & James	13 (2, 4, 3, 4)	Cha-cha-cha	"Mr Electric Blue" – Benson Boone	Last to be called safe
Amber & Alex	24 (5, 6, 6, 7)	Tango	"Call Me" – Blondie	Last to be called safe
Tolü & Maciej	32 (7, 8, 8, 9)	American Smooth	"Man I Need" – Olivia Dean	Safe
Paudie & Laura	23 (4, 6, 7, 6)	Waltz	"The Godfather Waltz" – Carlo Savina and Nino Rota	Safe
Philip & Daniela	31 (7, 8, 8, 8)	Salsa	"We Are One (Olodum Mix) – Pitbull	Safe
Niamh & Stephen	28 (6, 7, 7, 8)	Quickstep	"Billy-A-Dick" – Bette Midler	Safe

=== Week 3: Movie Week ===
Running order

Couple	Score	Dance	Music	Movie	Result
Philip & Daniela	29 (7, 7, 7, 8)	Paso Doble	"Superman Theme" – John Ottman	Superman	Safe
Tolü & Maciej	26 (6, 7, 6, 7)	Cha-cha-cha	"Car Wash" – Christina Aguilera feat. Missy Elliott	Shark Tale	Safe
Brian & James	15 (3, 4, 4, 4)	Paso Doble	"The Phantom of the Opera" – Sarah Brightman and Michael Crawford	The Phantom of the Opera	Eliminated
Katelyn & Leonardo	35 (8, 9, 9, 9)	American Smooth	"Whistle While You Work" – Rachel Zegler	Snow White	Safe
Anne & Robert	18 (4, 5, 4, 5)	Cha-cha-cha	"Fame" – Irene Cara	Fame	Safe
Stephanie & Ervinas	27 (6, 7, 7, 7)	Quickstep	"You're the One That I Want" – John Travolta and Olivia Newton-John	Grease	Last to be called safe
Amber & Alex	22 (5, 6, 5, 6)	Contemporary Ballroom	"For Good" – Cynthia Erivo and Ariana Grande	Wicked: For Good	Safe
Paudie & Laura	16 (4, 4, 4, 4)	Charleston	"Meet the Flintstones" – Postmodern Jukebox	The Flintstones	Last to be called safe
Niamh & Stephen	23 (5, 6, 6, 6)	Foxtrot	"Destination Anywhere" – The Commitments, Niamh Kavanagh	The Commitments	Safe
Eric & Arianna	31 (7, 8, 8, 8)	Samba	"Cuban Pete" – Jim Carrey	The Mask	Safe
Jordan & Rebecca	34 (7, 9, 9, 9)	Contemporary Ballroom	"Pandora" – James Horner	Avatar	Safe

=== Week 4: Country Week ===
Running order

Couple	Score	Dance	Music	Result
Amber & Alex	19 (5, 5, 4, 5)	American Smooth	"The Giver" – Chappell Roan	Eliminated
Eric & Arianna	31 (7, 8, 8, 8)	Viennese Waltz	"Tennessee Whiskey" – Chris Stapleton	Safe
Niamh & Stephen	16 (4, 5, 3, 4)	Cha-cha-cha	"That Don't Impress Me Much" – Shania Twain	Last to be called safe
Jordan & Rebecca	34 (8, 9, 8, 9)	Paso Doble	"Dead End Road" – Jelly Roll	Safe
Paudie & Laura	23 (5, 6, 6, 6)	Quickstep	"Stop the World (and Let Me Off)" – Declan Nerney	Safe
Tolü & Maciej	33 (7, 8, 9, 9)	Rumba	"There You'll Be" – Faith Hill	Safe
Anne & Robert	24 (6, 6, 6, 6)	Quickstep	"Ann" – Val Doonican	Last to be called safe
Philip & Daniela	33 (7, 8, 9, 9)	American Smooth	"Rhinestone Cowboy" – Glen Campbell	Safe
Stephanie & Ervinas	27 (6, 7, 7, 7)	Charleston	"Yihaa" – Dolly Style	Safe
Katelyn & Leonardo	30 (6, 8, 8, 8)	Quickstep	"Hit The Diff" – Marty Mone	Safe

=== Week 5: Dedicated Dance ===
Running order

Couple	Score	Dance	Music	Dedication	Result
Tolü & Maciej	32 (7, 8, 9, 8)	Foxtrot	"When We Were Young" – Adele	Her sister, Timmy	Safe
Philip & Daniela	19 (4, 5, 4, 6)	Samba	"Dancing Queen" – ABBA	His mother, Una	Safe
Stephanie & Ervinas	30 (6, 8, 8, 8)	Paso Doble	"Firestone (Glewil Remix) – Kygo feat. Conrad	Her son, Zach	Safe
Katelyn & Leonardo	35 (8, 9, 9, 9)	Contemporary Ballroom	"Never Enough" – Kelly Clarkson	Her parents, Noel & Siobhan	Granted immunity
Anne & Robert	25 (6, 7, 6, 6)	American Smooth	"Don't Stop" – Fleetwood Mac	Her mother, Nancy	Safe
Eric & Arianna	34 (8, 9, 8, 9)	Tango	"Clocks" – Coldplay	His nephew, Oisín	Safe
Jordan & Rebecca	39 (9, 10, 10, 10)	American Smooth	"The Voyage" – Christy Moore	His mother, Ruth	Safe
Niamh & Stephen	30 (7, 8, 7, 8)	American Smooth	"Daniel" – Elton John	Her nephew, Daniel	Safe
Paudie & Laura	11 (2, 4, 2, 3)	Jive	"Jailhouse Rock" – The Blues Brothers	His ten grandchildren	Safe

=== Week 6: Fright Night ===
Running order

Couple	Score	Dance	Music	Result
Stephanie & Ervinas	26 (6, 7, 6, 7)	Salsa	"Evacuate the Dancefloor" – Cascada	Safe
Paudie & Laura	23 (5, 6, 6, 6)	Paso Doble	"The Traitors theme" – Sam Watts	Safe
Katelyn & Leonardo	34 (7, 9, 9, 9)	Cha-cha-cha	"Break My Heart" – Dua Lipa	Immune
Anne & Robert	14 (3, 4, 3, 4)	Jive	"Can't Tame Her" – Zara Larsson	Eliminated
Jordan & Rebecca	28 (7, 7, 7, 7)	Samba	"I Want You to Freak" – Rak-Su	Last to be called safe
Philip & Daniela	33 (8, 8, 8, 9)	Tango	"Bad Case of Loving You (Doctor, Doctor)" – Robert Palmer	Bottom two
Tolü & Maciej	37 (9, 9, 9, 10)	Contemporary Ballroom	"Bring Me to Life" – Evanescence feat. Paul McCoy	Safe
Niamh & Stephen	31 (7, 7, 8, 9)	Paso Doble	"Danger! High Voltage" – Electric Six	Safe
Eric & Arianna	39 (9, 10, 10 10)	Charleston	"Happy" – C2C feat. Derek Martin	Safe

Judges' votes to save

- Gourounlian: Philip & Daniela
- Byrne: Philip & Daniela
- Redmond: Philip & Daniela
- Mabuse: Did not vote, but would have voted for Philip & Daniela

=== Week 7: Boy Bands vs. Girl Groups ===
Running order

The couples first performed one unlearned dance, then all couples were separated into two teams to perform a team dance to earn higher individual scores.

Couple	Score	Dance	Music	Result
Eric & Arianna	32 (8, 8, 8, 8)	Cha-cha-cha	"Waffle House" – Jonas Brothers	Last to be called safe
Niamh & Stephen	27 (6, 7, 7, 7)	Tango	"Survivor" – Destiny's Child	Eliminated
Jordan & Rebecca	35 (8, 9, 9, 9)	Quickstep	"Story of My Life" – One Direction	Bottom two
Stephanie & Ervinas	31 (7, 8, 8, 8)	Viennese Waltz	"End of the Road" – Boyz II Men	Safe
Philip & Daniela	35 (8, 9, 9, 9)	Charleston	"Love Machine" – Girls Aloud	Safe
Katelyn & Leonardo	39 (9, 10, 10, 10)	Rumba	"No Matter What" – Boyzone	Safe
Paudie & Laura	22 (5, 6, 5, 6)	Tango	"When You're Looking Like That" – Westlife	Safe
Tolü & Maciej	36 (8, 9, 9, 10)	Salsa	"Boombayah" – Blackpink	Safe
Eric & Arianna; Jordan & Rebecca; Paudie & Laura; Philip & Daniela; Team Captain: Jennifer Zamparelli	33 (8, 9, 8, 8)	Freestyle (Team Jennifer)	"Relight My Fire" – Take That feat. Lulu	
Katelyn & Leonardo; Niamh & Stephen; Stephanie & Ervinas; Tolü & Maciej; Team Captain: Laura Fox	39 (9, 10, 10, 10)	Freestyle (Team Laura)	"Spice Up Your Life" – Spice Girls	

Judges' votes to save

- Gourounlian: Jordan & Rebecca
- Byrne: Jordan & Rebecca
- Redmond: Jordan & Rebecca
- Mabuse: Did not vote, but would have voted for Jordan & Rebecca

=== Week 8: The 100th Episode ===
Running order

Individual judges scores given in the chart below (given in parentheses) are listed in this order from left to right: Brian Redmond, Karen Byrne, Nicky Byrne, Oti Mabuse, Arthur Gourounlian.

Couple	Score	Dance	Music	All-Star Mentor	Result
Jordan & Rebecca	43 (8, 9, 9, 8, 9)	Jive	"Runaway Baby" – Bruno Mars	Jordan Conroy, Season 5	Bottom two
Stephanie & Ervinas	34 (6, 7, 8, 6, 7)	Samba	"Lo-Lo Dzama" — Šum Svistu	Ryan Andrews, Season 4	Eliminated
Tolü & Maciej	49 (9, 10, 10, 10, 10)	Tango	"Applause" – Lady Gaga	Blu Hydrangea, Season 7	Safe
Katelyn & Leonardo	50 (10, 10, 10, 10, 10)	Viennese Waltz	"You Are the Reason" – Calum Scott feat. Leona Lewis	Mairéad Ronan, Season 3	Safe
Paudie & Laura	25 (4, 6, 7, 3, 5)	Salsa	"Soul Bossa Nova" – Quincy Jones	Des Cahill, Season 1	Last to be called safe
Eric & Arianna	46 (9, 9, 10, 9, 9)	Paso Doble	"The Greatest Show" – Panic! at the Disco	Brooke Scullion, Season 6	Safe
Philip & Daniela	48 (9, 10, 10, 9, 10)	Contemporary Ballroom	"Sign of the Times" – Harry Styles	Jake Carter, Season 2	Safe

Judges' votes to save

- Gourounlian: Jordan & Rebecca
- Byrne: Jordan & Rebecca
- Redmond: Jordan & Rebecca
- Mabuse: Did not vote, but would have voted to save Jordan & Rebecca

=== Week 9: Orchestra Night ===
Running order

The couples first performed one unlearned dance, then all six couples participated in a dance marathon in a bid to increase their scores.

Couple	Score	Dance	Music	Result
Philip & Daniela	31 (7, 8, 8, 8)	Jive	"Don't Stop Me Now" – Queen	Eliminated
Paudie & Laura	24 (6, 6, 5, 7)	Viennese Waltz	"Annie's Song" – John Denver	Safe
Tolü & Maciej	40 (10, 10, 10, 10)	Charleston	"Where Is My Husband!" – Raye	Bottom two
Jordan & Rebecca	37 (8, 9, 10, 10)	Tango	"As It Was" – Harry Styles	Safe
Eric & Arianna	37 (9, 10, 9, 9)	Contemporary Ballroom	"Another Love" – Tom Odell	Safe
Katelyn & Leonardo	35 (9, 9, 8, 9)	Salsa	"Ran Kan Kan" – Tito Puente	Safe
Paudie & Laura	1	Orchestra-thon	"Roll Over Beethoven" – Chuck Berry	
Tolü & Maciej	2	Orchestra-thon	"Roll Over Beethoven" – Chuck Berry	
Katelyn & Leonardo	3	Orchestra-thon	"Roll Over Beethoven" – Chuck Berry	
Philip & Daniela	4	Orchestra-thon	"Roll Over Beethoven" – Chuck Berry	
Jordan & Rebecca	5	Orchestra-thon	"Roll Over Beethoven" – Chuck Berry	
Eric & Arianna	6	Orchestra-thon	"Roll Over Beethoven" – Chuck Berry	

Judges' votes to save

- Gourounlian: Tolü & Maciej
- Byrne: Tolü & Maciej
- Redmond: Tolü & Maciej
- Mabuse: Did not vote, but would have voted for Tolü & Maciej

=== Week 10: Dance Through the Decades ===
The couples first performed one unlearned dance followed by a trio dance. For the trio dances each couple was joined by one eliminated pro dancer.

Running order

Couple	Score	Dance	Music	Decade	Result
Paudie & Laura (with Robert Rowiński)	26 (6, 7, 6, 7)	American Smooth	"Cheek to Cheek" – Jane Lynch & Matthew Morrison	1930s	Safe
Paudie & Laura (with Robert Rowiński)	24 (6, 6, 6, 6)	Samba	"Gangnam Style" – Psy	2010s	Safe
Jordan & Rebecca (with James Cutler)	38 (9, 9, 10, 10)	Cha-cha-cha	"Dreamer" – Livin' Joy	1990s	Eliminated
Jordan & Rebecca (with James Cutler)	39 (9, 10, 10, 10)	Charleston	"Help!" – The Beatles	1960s	Eliminated
Katelyn & Leonardo (with Alex Vladimirov)	40 (10, 10, 10, 10)	Charleston	"Charleston" – Bob Wilson And His Varsity Rhythm Boys	1920s	Safe
Katelyn & Leonardo (with Alex Vladimirov)	38 (10, 9, 9, 10)	Samba	"Single Ladies (Put a Ring on It)" – Beyoncé	2000s	Safe
Tolü & Maciej (with Stephen Vincent)	36 (8, 9, 9, 10)	Paso Doble	"Welcome to the Jungle" – Guns N' Roses	1980s	Bottom two
Tolü & Maciej (with Stephen Vincent)	35 (8, 9, 9, 9)	Jive	"Tutti Frutti" – Little Richard	1950s	Bottom two
Eric & Arianna (with Kylee Vincent)	39 (9, 10, 10, 10)	Salsa	"Boogie Wonderland" – Earth, Wind & Fire	1970s	Safe
Eric & Arianna (with Kylee Vincent)	40 (10, 10, 10, 10)	Quickstep	"Boogie Woogie Bugle Boy" – The Puppini Sisters	1940s	Safe

Judges' votes to save

- Gourounlian: Tolü & Maciej
- Byrne: Jordan & Rebecca
- Redmond: Tolü & Maciej
- Mabuse: Tolü & Maciej

=== Week 11: The Final ===
Running order

Each couple performed twice- one dance chosen by the judges and their showdance routine.

Couple	Score	Dance	Music	Result
Eric & Arianna	40 (10, 10, 10, 10)	Charleston	"Happy" – C2C feat. Derek Martin	Runners-up
Eric & Arianna	40 (10, 10, 10, 10)	Showdance	"Can't Hold Us" – Macklemore & Ryan Lewis	Runners-up
Tolü & Maciej	40 (10, 10, 10, 10)	American Smooth	"Man I Need" – Olivia Dean	Runners-up
Tolü & Maciej	37 (9, 9, 9, 10)	Showdance	"Kill the Lights" – Jess Glynne, Alex Newell, DJ Cassidy and Nile Rodgers	Runners-up
Paudie & Laura	28 (7, 7, 7, 7)	Quickstep	"Stop the World (and Let Me Off)" – Declan Nerney	Runners-up
Paudie & Laura	29 (7, 7, 7, 8)	Showdance	"Can't Take My Eyes Off You" – Andy Williams	Runners-up
Katelyn & Leonardo	40 (10, 10, 10, 10)	American Smooth	"Whistle While You Work" – Rachel Zegler	Winner
Katelyn & Leonardo	40 (10, 10, 10, 10)	Showdance	"Ordinary" – Alex Warren	Winner

== Dance chart ==
Highest scoring dance
Lowest scoring dance
No dance performed
Not performed due to illness or injury
Immune from elimination

Couple	1	2	3	4	5	6	7		8	9		10		11	
Katelyn & Leonardo	Tango	Jive	American Smooth	Quickstep	Contemporary Ballroom	Cha-cha-cha	Rumba	Freestyle (Team Laura)	Viennese Waltz	Salsa	Orchestra-thon	Charleston	Samba (with Alex)	American Smooth	Showdance
Eric & Arianna	Jive	Foxtrot	Samba	Viennese Waltz	Tango	Charleston	Cha-cha-cha	Freestyle (Team Jennifer)	Paso Doble	Contemporary Ballroom	Orchestra-thon	Salsa	Quickstep (with Kylee)	Charleston	Showdance
Paudie & Laura	Cha-cha-cha	Waltz	Charleston	Quickstep	Jive	Paso Doble	Tango	Freestyle (Team Jennifer)	Salsa	Viennese Waltz	Orchestra-thon	American Smooth	Samba (with Robert)	Quickstep	Showdance
Tolü & Maciej	Samba	American Smooth	Cha-cha-cha	Rumba	Foxtrot	Contemporary Ballroom	Salsa	Freestyle (Team Laura)	Tango	Charleston	Orchestra-thon	Paso Doble	Jive (with Stephen)	American Smooth	Showdance
Jordan & Rebecca	Salsa	Viennese Waltz	Contemporary Ballroom	Paso Doble	American Smooth	Samba	Quickstep	Freestyle (Team Jennifer)	Jive	Tango	Orchestra-thon	Cha-cha-cha	Charleston (with James)		
Philip & Daniela	Waltz	Salsa	Paso Doble	American Smooth	Samba	Tango	Charleston	Freestyle (Team Jennifer)	Contemporary Ballroom	Jive	Orchestra-thon				
Stephanie & Ervinas	American Smooth	Cha-cha-cha	Quickstep	Charleston	Paso Doble	Salsa	Viennese Waltz	Freestyle (Team Laura)	Samba						
Niamh & Stephen	Salsa	Quickstep	Foxtrot	Cha-cha-cha	American Smooth	Paso Doble	Tango	Freestyle (Team Laura)							
Anne & Robert	Foxtrot	Paso Doble	Cha-cha-cha	Quickstep	American Smooth	Jive									
Amber & Alex	Cha-cha-cha	Tango	Contemporary Ballroom	American Smooth											
Brian & James	Viennese Waltz	Cha-cha-cha	Paso Doble												
Michael & Kylee	Quickstep	Samba													
