= The Apprentice (British TV series) series 20 =

The Apprentice
- Series 20
- Starring: Alan Sugar; Karren Brady; Tim Campbell
- No. of episodes: 12

Release
- Original network: BBC One
- Original release: 29 January – 16 April 2026

Series chronology
- ← Previous; Series 19

The twentieth series of British reality television series The Apprentice premiered on 29 January 2026. Karren Brady and Tim Campbell returned as Lord Sugar's aides. The series featured twenty candidates, the highest number since the tenth series in 2014.

The series concluded on 16 April 2026, with Karishma Vijay emerging as the overall winner, with Pascha Myhill finishing as the runner-up.

== Production ==
In April 2024, prior to the airing of the previous series, the BBC announced that applications were open for the twentieth series. They closed on 15 February 2025. Lord Sugar announced that he would return for this series, and at least two further series thereafter. Karren Brady and Tim Campbell are set to return as Sugar's aides. Tom Allen stepped down from the programme's spin off show The Apprentice: You're Fired! after seven years, with Angela Scanlon taking over as host and the programme being rebranded as The Apprentice: Unfinished Business.

== Series overview ==
=== Candidates ===
The twenty candidates appearing in the twentieth series were announced on 19 January 2026.

Candidate	Background	Age	Result
Karishma Vijay	Beauty brand owner	28	Winner
Pascha Myhill	Recruitment consultant	21	Runner-up
Dan Miller	Student recruitment company owner	27	Fired in the interviews stage
Lawrence Rosenberg	Public relations specialist	28	Fired in the interviews stage
Priyesh Bathia	Global account manager	28	Fired in the interviews stage
Rothna Akhtar	Student wellbeing advisor	28	Fired in the tenth task
Kieran McCartney	Estate agent	26	Quit in the tenth task
Conor Galvin	Photobooth business owner	29	Fired in the ninth task
Levi Hague	Former RAF gunner and HGV driver	32	Fired in the ninth task
Harry Clough	Financial sales manager	27	Fired in the eighth task
Rajan Gill	Pharmaceutical sales specialist	30	Fired in the seventh task
Andrea Cooper	Lettings agency owner	46	Fired in the sixth task
Carrington Saunders	Online loungewear business owner	23	Fired in the sixth task
Megan Ruiter	Online clothing brand owner	26	Fired in the sixth task
Vanessa Tetteh-Squire	Technology project manager	28	Fired in the fifth task
Roxanne Hamedi	Pharmacist	32	Fired in the fourth task
Tanmay Hingorani	AI product consultant	28	Fired in the third task
Marcus Donkoh	Barber shop owner	28	Fired in the second task
Georgina Newton	Actress and events manager	31	Fired in the first task
Nikki Jetha	Mortgage broker	33	Fired in the first task

=== Performance chart ===
Task Number
Candidate	1	2	3	4	5	6	7	8	9	10	11	12
Karishma	LOSS	IN	LOSS	WIN	LOSS	IN	IN	LOSS	IN	WIN	IN	HIRED
Pascha	LOSS	IN	IN	LOSS	BR	IN	LOSS	IN	WIN	IN	IN	RUNNER-UP
Dan	IN	BR	WIN	LOSS	LOSS	IN	IN	IN	BR	BR	FIRED	
Lawrence	IN	LOSS	LOSS	IN	BR	IN	LOSE	LOSS	IN	IN	FIRED	
Priyesh	IN	BR	LOSS	IN	LOSS	WIN	IN	IN	IN	IN	FIRED	
Rothna	BR	IN	IN	LOSS	WIN	LOSS	LOSS	IN	LOSS	FIRED		
Kieran	WIN	BR	LOSS	IN	IN	LOSS	IN	LOSE	BR	LEFT (Note: Following the previous task, Kieran told Lord Sugar that he would assume the role of project manager in the next task, and if his team lost, he would leave the process. This was ultimately the case and he left the process.)		
Conor	IN	LOSS	IN	LOSE	LOSS	IN	IN	BR	FIRED			
Levi	IN	IN	IN	LOSS	IN	IN	BR	WIN	FIRED			
Harry	IN	LOSS	IN	IN	IN	LOSS	WIN	FIRED				
Rajan	IN	LOSS	IN	BR	IN	LOSS	FIRED					
Andrea	BR	WIN	LOSS	IN	IN	FIRED						
Carrington	BR	IN	LOSE	IN	IN	FIRED						
Megan	LOSS	IN	BR	IN	IN	FIRED						
Vanessa	LOSS	IN	IN	LOSS	FIRED							
Roxanne	BR	IN	IN	FIRED								
Tanmay	IN	LOSS	FIRED									
Marcus	IN	FIRED										
Georgina	FIRED											
Nikki	FIRED											

HIRED The candidate won this series of The Apprentice.
RUNNER-UP The candidate was the runner-up.
WIN The candidate won as project manager on their team, for this task.
LOSE The candidate lost as project manager on their team, for this task.
IN The candidate was on the winning team for this task / passed the Interviews stage.
LOSS The candidate was on the losing team for this task.
BR The candidate was brought to the final boardroom for this task.
FIRED The candidate was fired in this task.
FIRED The candidate lost as project manager for this task and was fired.
IN The candidate was unable to participate in this task due to illness, but did not leave the process.
LEFT The candidate left the process but was deemed culpable for their team’s loss as project manager.

== Episodes ==
No. overall	No. in series	Title	Original release date	UK viewers (millions)
261	1	"Hong Kong"	29 January 2026	5.22
Lord Sugar begins his search for a new business partner for 2026 amongst twenty new candidates. For their first task, the teams are sent to Hong Kong and tasked with buying a list of nine items, each for the cheapest price. Both teams suffer from severe disorganisation and item research, along with being late to the finish line; the men secure three items, but purchase an incorrect item, while the women secure only two items. In the boardroom, Lord Sugar voices disappointment at their performances, despite the men winning the task. Amongst the losing team, Nikki Jetha becomes the first to be fired for her lack of strategy and poor leadership of the team as a whole, while Georgina Newton is also dismissed for her unsuitable personality.
262	2	"Children's Story"	5 February 2026	4.70
Returning to London, the teams find their next task is create a children's story and an accompanying audiobook, then pitch their creation to retailers and secure orders. The men's team create a story about a child astronaut looking for a toilet in space, but their concept is criticised for lacking illustrations and its toilet humour. The women's team, provided a male candidate from the other team to help, create a story about a zebra's first day at school, but face concerns over the visual elements matching the story's narrative. In the boardroom, the women's team win with higher sales, leaving the men to face questions on their flawed product. Amongst the final four, Marcus Donkoh is dismissed for his poor leadership, backing a flawed story, and failing to bring back the sub-team members responsible for the story.
263	3	"Chicken v Egg"	12 February 2026	5.05
Each team, after choosing a name, is given 25 kilograms of one of two products, converting these into snack food to sell to public, and as a canapé for a corporate client's event. Alpha receive chicken meat, making chicken & mushroom pies for public trade, along with combining the meat with courgettes for their canapés, but struggle with problems from their PM, and questions by the clients on their canapés' flavour. Eclipse uses eggs, making carbonaras for public trade, and egg skewers for their canapés, but face huge problems with the selection for the recipe team, poor costing and negotiation skills, poor quality corporate service, and issues in the kitchen. In the boardroom, Alpha win with a higher profit, leaving Eclipse under scrutiny. Of the final three, Tanmay Hingorani is fired for poor negotiation skills that contributed greatly to the team's failure.
264	4	"Advertising Water"	19 February 2026	4.38
Lord Sugar tasks the teams with designing a new brand of bottled water, complete with TV advertising and social media campaigns, before pitching their concept to a panel of experts, including rapper and bottled water entrepreneur Big Zuu. Eclipse focus on branding their water towards the fitness market; they earn praise for their advert, but are criticsed over the product's brand design and their bad live-stream promotion. Alpha focus on branding their water towards commuters; despite an interesting live-stream promotion, they face criticisms on a poor brand, the pitching of their concept, and a dull advert. In the boardroom. Lord Sugar deems Eclipse's campaign is the best, leaving Alpha to face questions on their concept. Of the final three, Roxanne Hamedi is dismissed from the process after being held responsible for creating the team's poor branding.
265	5	"Flowers"	26 February 2026	4.77
The teams are challenged to source a variety of different flowers, before selling their choices as bouquets to the public, along with an artistic display for a corporate client. Eclipse focus on using country garden flowers; while they sell out well to public with their bouquets, they receive less than agreed upon from their client due to the quality of their display. Alpha opt for tropical flowers, but receive half their fee from their client for an unsatisfactory display – which is later ditched – and not having enough bouquets to sell to the public. In the boardroom, Eclipse win the task with a sizeable profit, leading Alpha to be scrutinised on the decisions they made. Of the final three, Vanessa Tetteh-Squire is fired for her poor leadership, and for bringing a teammate back into the boardroom without a good reason.
266	6	"Egypt"	5 March 2026	4.72
Lord Sugar sends the teams to El Gouna, Egypt, where they are to provide a quality corporate away day for two different clients. Alpha opt for a desert tour with a coffee-making team activity; despite problems with their meal service, their clients are left satisifed with the rest of their experience. Eclipse opt for a boat tour on the River Nile along with a pottery making activity; however, their client is left unsatisfied by a bad dining service, and an unwelcome kayaking activity they were unprepared for. In the boardroom, Alpha wins the task by making a profit despite a small refund, with Eclipse left to face severe criticism on the net loss they made following a huge refund. In the final boardroom, Lord Sugar fires all three who are brought back, each for specific reasons: Megan Ruiter, for poor leadership on a task suited to her skills, and her poor track record in the process; Carrington Saunders, for her mismanagement of the team's kitchen; and Andrea Cooper, for her negative attitude throughout the task.
267	7	"Gamified Fitness"	12 March 2026	4.79
Both teams find their next task involves creating a new virtual reality game with an emphasis on the fitness theme, pitching their creations to industry experts, and securing investment for further development. Alpha focus on a game with a sci-fi theme aimed at collecting coins and fighting robots, but face criticism on character design and the game's name. Eclipse opt for a game with a fantasy theme aimed at dodging creatures, but lack proper co-ordination that lead to them receiving negative feedback on the game's structure and its logo. In the boardroom, Alpha secures a higher investment for their game, leaving Eclipse facing questions over their concept. Of the final three, Rajan Gill is dismissed for his lack of overall contributions and for continuously highlighting errors without offering any solutions.
268	8	"Discount Buying: Take Two"	19 March 2026	4.58
Following the fiasco in Hong Kong, Lord Sugar gives both teams a chance of redemption, as they seek out nine items for the best price on the Isle of Wight. Both teams manage to perform better, but with differences: Alpha focus on a strategy of meeting in the middle of an offered price and wasting little time, though half the team ignore this; Eclipse manage to secure items, despite struggling to source items and risking half the team not reaching the finish line on time. In the boardroom, Eclipse manage to spend less and secure all but one item, with Alpha questioned over their strategy and some of their negotiations. Of the final three, Harry Clough is ejected from the process for making a hasty decision with a purchase that contributed greatly to the team's loss.
269	9	"TV Selling"	26 March 2026	4.61
Lord Sugar instructs each team to choose a selection of products to sell during a primtetime slot on a TV channel, which he and his grandson will monitor at home. Alpha opt for a valuable ring, two household gadgets, and a table tennis set; despite one product not selling and communication issues to the presentation team, they are able to make sales with their other choices. Eclipse opt for a bracelet, two fitness products, and a shoe cleaner, but struggle with making sales due to lacklustre presentation of products. In the boardroom, Alpha win with higher sale figures, leaving Eclipse to be scrutinised over their performance. Amongst the losing team, Levi Hague is fired in the initial boardroom for his weak display of salesmanship during the selling process and raising questions about his performance during the process, while Conor Galvin is later dismissed for his poor leadership, selling the least items of the team and his second loss as Project Manager.
270	10	"Pet Product"	2 April 2026	4.51
As the final tasks approach, the candidates must design and pitch a pet product, and create a social media campaign to promote it. Both teams find their respective products coming in for criticism, with Alpha's talking dog bed suffering from an unclear purpose and poor branding, while Eclipse's cat tree is seen to suffer from design problems, including being too large. Alpha ultimately secure more orders, leading to Eclipse's project manager Kieran McCartney being forced to honour his promise to resign from the process if the team lost. Between the remaining two members of Eclipse, Rothna Akhtar is fired for her lack of sales in the task, and for lacking the required experience for her business proposal.
271	11	"Interviews"	9 April 2026	4.77
After facing ten tasks as teams, the remaining five candidates now compete as individuals in their next task – a series of tough, gruelling interviews with some of Lord Sugar's closest associates: Claudine Collins, Claude Littner, Mike Soutar and Linda Plant. Each member faces scrutiny over their backgrounds, work experience, track record, and business proposals. Feedback to Lord Sugar, alongside observations by his aides, leads him to firing Priyesh Bathia for raising concerns over the potential profitability of his business, Lawrence Rosenberg for using artificial intelligence in writing his business plan, and Dan Miller for offering an overly complex business plan and concerns over his existing business being unprofitable. Of the remaining two, both Karishma Vijay and Pascha Myhill receive strongly positive feedback despite issues with their respective financial figures.
272	12	"The Final"	16 April 2026	4.64
After facing a multitude of business tasks and a tough interview, the two finalists, aided by old colleagues, face the task of launching their respective new businesses, produce advertising campaigns and pitching their businesses to a series of industry experts and previous candidates from the past 20 years. Based on feedback from those presentations, Lord Sugar chooses Karishma Vijay as his business partner for 2026 for her very solid and consistent track record throughout the whole series, her proven track record in her chosen field, and for being a much stronger finalist over runner-up Pascha Myhill.
