= The Traitors Ireland series 1 =

2025 series of The Traitors Ireland

The Traitors Ireland
- Series 1
- Promotional poster
- Presented by: Siobhán McSweeney
- No. of contestants: 24
- Winners: Kelley Higgins; Oyin Adeyemi; Vanessa Ogbonna
- Location: Slane Castle, Slane, County Meath, Ireland
- Companion show: The Traitors Ireland: Uncloaked
- No. of episodes: 12

Release
- Original network: RTÉ One
- Original release: 31 August – 23 September 2025

Series chronology
- Next → Series 2

The first series of The Traitors Ireland was first broadcast on RTÉ One on 31 August 2025. The series concluded on 23 September 2025 where Kelley Higgins, Oyin Adeyemi and Vanessa Ogbonna won as Faithfuls.

== Format ==
Over twenty contestants arrive at a castle in Meath where they will spend their entire time for the duration of the game. On the arrival day, host Siobhán McSweeney picks at least three contestants to be called "Traitors" and the rest are automatically called "Faithful".

At the end of each day, all contestants meet at a Round Table to discuss who they think are Traitors. They then cast votes that are revealed one by one. The person with the most votes reveals their identity and is immediately banished. On most nights, the Traitors meet in private and agree to "murder" one Faithful who leaves the game immediately. The remaining Faithful only know who has been murdered at breakfast next morning.

Each day, the group participates in missions to win money for the prize fund which can reach up to €50,000 by the end of the game. During the missions, any contestant may separately win a shield that awards that player immunity from being murdered, but not from being banished. In some cases, the contestant has the right or ability not to disclose if they won the shield, or to tell a restricted group.

If during the game the number of Traitors drops to two, they are given the option to "seduce" or recruit a Faithful to join them instead of murdering. Seduced Faithfuls may decline and can decide whether to tell the other Faithfuls of the attempted seduction. If only one Traitor remains, the seduction happens as a face-to-face ultimatum; if the player declines they are immediately murdered, and if they accept the pair can immediately murder another Faithful.

== Contestants ==
Contestants were revealed on 31 August 2025, shortly before the premiere of the series. Amongst the contestants was a secret father and son pair, Andrew and Paudie.

List of The Traitors Ireland contestants
Contestant	Age	Residence	Occupation	Affiliation	Finish
Gemma Lalor	39	Portlaoise	Artist and holistic therapist	None	Eliminated (Episode 1)
David Collins	48	Dublin	Gardener	Faithful	Murdered (Episode 2)
Diane Flaherty	54	Kilronan	Radio presenter	Faithful	Banished (Episode 2)
Niall McKeown	25	Clonoe	Teacher	Faithful	Murdered (Episode 3)
Nina Shelton	45	Wexford	Financial director	Faithful	Banished (Episode 3)
Michele Maher	52	Dublin	Sports leader	Faithful	Murdered (Episode 4)
Linda Kelly	24	Lahardane	Doctor	Faithful	Banished (Episode 4)
John Malone	53	Cork	Firefighter	Faithful	Murdered (Episode 5)
Eamon O'Keeffe	36	Cahir	Garda	Traitor	Banished (Episode 5)
Katelyn Divilly	32	Galway	Leadership consultant	Traitor	Banished (Episode 6)
Andrew Moloney	33	Cork	Civil servant	Traitor (Note: Andrew was recruited as a Traitor in Episode 7.)	Banished (Episode 7)
Mark White	38	Durrow	IT analyst	Faithful	Murdered (Episode 8)
Patrick Hughes	55	Westport	Restauranteur/former casino manager	Faithful	Banished (Episode 8)
Christine Duff	38	Ballincollig	Therapist	Faithful	Murdered (Episode 9)
Paudie Moloney	68	Kilmallock	Retired prison officer	Traitor	Banished (Episode 9)
Amy Meehan	35	Dublin	Apprentice tattoo artist	Faithful	Murdered (Episode 10)
Joanna Masiarek	39	Kildare	Logistics specialist	Faithful	Banished (Episode 10)
Wilkin Garcia	44	Dublin	Field engineer	Faithful	Murdered (Episode 11)
Faye Brennan	27	Dublin	Event coordinator	Faithful	Banished (Episode 11)
Nick O'Loughlin	30	Wicklow	Estate agent	Traitor (Note: Nick was recruited as a Traitor in Episode 8.)	Banished (Episode 12)
Ben Donohue	33	Dublin	Irish Defence Forces	Traitor (Note: Ben was recruited as a Traitor in Episode 10.)	Banished (Episode 12)
Kelley Higgins	23	Letterkenny	Business graduate	Faithful	Winner (Episode 12)
Oyin Adeyemi	23	Dublin	Model	Faithful	Winner (Episode 12)
Vanessa Ogbonna	28	Tramore	Content creator	Faithful	Winner (Episode 12)

== Elimination history ==
Key
The contestant was a Faithful
The contestant was a Traitor
The contestant was murdered by the traitors
The contestant was banished at the round table
The contestant was immune at this Banishment and Murder

Episode	1	2	3	4	5	6	7		8		9	10		11	12
Traitors' Decision	None	David	Niall	Michele	John	Nick (Note: Instead of choosing to murder a player, the Traitors decided to offer Nick the opportunity to become a Traitor. He declined their offer.)	Andrew (Note: Following Katelyn’s banishment, Paudie was allowed to give a Faithful an ultimatum: become a Traitor or be Murdered. He chose Andrew, who accepted the offer.)	Christine; Joanna; Mark; Patrick	Nick (Note: Following Andrew’s banishment, Paudie was allowed to give a Faithful an ultimatum: become a Traitor or be Murdered. He chose Nick, who accepted the offer.)	Mark	Christine (Note: After the Round Table in Episode 8, the Traitors were tasked to murder someone in plain sight, by giving them an Irish curse to their victim with a "farewell hug". Nick was successful in hugging a player, Christine. However, the curse did not work immediately, so Christine was present at breakfast the next morning. The players were told that the victim would succumb to the curse at the end of the Funeral Procession Challenge.)	Ben (Note: Following Paudie’s banishment, Nick was allowed to give a Faithful an ultimatum: become a Traitor or be Murdered. He chose Ben, who accepted the offer.)	Amy	Wilkin	None
Traitors' Decision	None	Murder				Seduce	Blackmail	Death Row (Note: Instead of selecting one Faithful to be murdered, the Traitors were asked to put four players on death row. The next night, only these players would be at risk of elimination.)	Blackmail	Murder		Blackmail	Murder		None
Shield	None	None	Katelyn (Note: Upon John's reentry, he received a shield which he had to give to another contestant before the end of the night. He chose Katelyn.)	None		Oyin	Christine		Vanessa		None	Kelley		None	None
Banishment	None	Diane	Nina	Linda	Eamon	Katelyn	Tie	Andrew	Patrick		Paudie	Joanna		Faye	Nick
Vote	Andrew's Choice (Note: Before entering the castle, Andrew was nominated most trustworthy. He was then instructed to eliminate two contestants before the game began. He chose Gemma and John.)	13–5– 1–1–1	9–3–2–2– 1–1–1	10–5– 1–1–1	7–4–2– 1–1–1	10–5	7–7	7–5	8–4		5–3–1–1	7–2		5–1	3–2
Kelley	No vote	Diane	Eamon	Linda	Eamon	Katelyn	Patrick	Patrick	Wilkin		Vanessa	Joanna		Faye	Nick
Oyin	No vote	Diane	Eamon	Eamon	Eamon	Katelyn	Andrew	Andrew	Patrick		Paudie	Joanna		Faye	Nick
Vanessa	No vote	Diane	Paudie	Paudie	Eamon	Katelyn	Andrew	Patrick	Patrick		Paudie	Joanna		Faye	Nick
Ben	No vote	Diane	Nina	Paudie	Eamon	Andrew	Andrew	Andrew	Patrick		Paudie	Joanna		Faye	Vanessa
Nick	No vote	Diane	Nina	Linda	Eamon	Andrew	Andrew	Andrew	Patrick		Paudie	Joanna		Faye	Vanessa
Faye	No vote	Diane	Linda	Linda	Paudie	Katelyn	Andrew	Andrew	Patrick		Paudie	Joanna		Oyin	Banished (Episode 11)
Wilkin	No vote	Diane	Christine	Linda	Kelley	Katelyn	Patrick	Andrew	Patrick		Joanna	Joanna		Murdered (Episode 11)	
Joanna	No vote	Wilkin	Nina	Linda	Andrew	Andrew	Patrick	Andrew	Wilkin		Vanessa	Vanessa	Vanessa (Note: This contestant held a dagger, granting them an extra vote at the roundtable.)	Banished (Episode 10)	
Amy	No vote	Diane	Nina	Linda	Wilkin	Katelyn	Patrick	Patrick	Patrick		Vanessa	Murdered (Episode 10)			
Paudie	No vote	Diane	Nina	Patrick	Katelyn	Katelyn	Patrick	Patrick	Patrick		Nick	Banished (Episode 9)			
Christine	No vote	Wilkin	Nina	Linda	Katelyn	Katelyn	Patrick	Patrick	Wilkin		Murdered (Episode 9)				
Patrick	No vote	Nina	Nina	Linda	Paudie	Katelyn	Andrew	No vote	Wilkin		Banished (Episode 8)				
Mark	No vote	Paudie	Eamon	Paudie	Eamon	Andrew	Andrew	Andrew	Murdered (Episode 8)						
Andrew	Gemma; John	Wilkin	Nina	Linda	Eamon	Katelyn	Patrick	No vote	Banished (Episode 7)						
Katelyn	No vote	Wilkin	Paudie	Paudie	Paudie	Andrew	Banished (Episode 6)								
Eamon	No vote	Diane	Oyin	Paudie	Paudie	Banished (Episode 5)									
John	Eliminated (Episode 1)		No; Vote (Note: John was voted back into the Castle by the Group after the 3rd Mission. Upon his reentry, he could not be voted for or murdered that night. He was also not allowed to vote at the Round Table that night.)	Linda	Murdered (Episode 5)										
Linda	No vote	Diane	Oyin	Katelyn	Banished (Episode 4)										
Michele	No vote	Wilkin	Nina	Murdered (Episode 4)											
Nina	No vote	Diane	Patrick	Banished (Episode 3)											
Niall	No vote	Diane	Murdered (Episode 3)												
Diane	No vote	Vanessa	Banished (Episode 2)												
David	No vote	Murdered (Episode 2)													
Gemma	Eliminated (Episode 1)														

=== End game ===
Episode	12			
Decision	Banish	Ben	End Game	Game Over; Faithfuls Win
Vote	4–0	3–1	3–0	Game Over; Faithfuls Win
Kelley	Banish	Ben	End Game	Winners
Oyin	Banish	Ben	End Game	Winners
Vanessa	Banish	Ben	End Game	Winners
Ben	Banish	Vanessa	Banished	

== Missions ==
Episode	Task description	Time limit	Money earned	Money available	Running total	Shield winner
1	The contestants had 30 minutes to transport whisky barrels from the nearby River Boyne to an old distillery on the top of a nearby hill. Along the path were 24 barrels valued between €200 and €500 - the heavier the barrel, the harder it would be to transport. All barrels that made it across the finish line at the distillery before time was up would count towards the prize fund based on their valuation.	30 minutes	€4,800	€6,000	€4,800	None
2	The contestants had to find 10 symbols out of 30 spread in the woods; each of them corresponded to an Ogham stone. In order to place the correct symbol, the players had to decipher the marking on the stones by reading upward and translating to letters by using the Ogham language key, which will translate into a Gaelic word that matches one of the symbols in the woods. If they all place the symbols correctly in 30 minutes, a beacon will be lit up, indicating that they have earn €5,000, while they'll win nothing if they can't accomplish it in time.	30 minutes	€5,000	€5,000	€9,800	None
3	The contestants had 15 minutes to find and dig up 200 gold bars scattered throughout the woods using their hands; once they found them, they had to put them in a chest for the masked monks to count towards the prize pot. Each bar is worth €20, meaning up to €4,000 can be earned if the group puts all of the bars in on time. At the end of the Mission, two of the masked monks are revealed to be the Fake Eliminated contestants. After hearing their pleas, the group had to choose individually which one would join the game back by placing a gold bar under their feet. The player that did not receive the majority would be officially eliminated from the game, while the saved player have a Shield and can give it to any player of their choice.	15 minutes	€4,000	€4,000	€13,800	Katelyn
4	The contestants are divided into 5 teams; one representative from each team at a time went into the sanctuary to hear a page and paragraph reference from Siobhán. They would then relay this information to their team and use The Book of Legend to find a riddle – leading to a clothing item worn by one member of the masked congregation. Each correctly-identified item earned €800, however Siobhán will tempted the person who found the gold to exchange for a Shield for themselves, though the person can refuse the deal and add the gold into the pot.	No time limit	€4,000	€4,000	€17,800	None
5	The contestants are divided into 3 teams (2 teams of 5 and a team of 6), where they all have to unlock a chest containing €2,000 within 30 minutes. The 5-digit code is known to the Traitors, and the players have to figure it out by solving math equations. In order to do so, the teams have to raft on one side of the river to the other, where they will encounter the color-coded math equations with unique symbols and memorise it, before writing them down on a board and forming the correct code based on the golden box answers. In addition to the money on the chest, 10 bags worth €100 each are hanging along the river path and players can untied it if they have time.	30 minutes	€2,600	€3,000	€20,400	None
6	The contestants will play two games in a casino-style format, where Siobhán will randomly select three players to compete for the money and a Shield for themselves. In the first game, the other players have to guess which of the three finished the mini-challenges the fastest (building a two-story house of cards, solving a jigsaw puzzle, and throwing the cards in the air and finding the Joker card amongst them). For each mini challenge, the group will earn €500 for the correct player. In the second game, Siobhán will ask a series of questions about the remaining contestants, and the three contestants have to write their answers on a board along with the remaining contestants. For each of their answers that matched the group's answer, €100 was added to the prize fund. A total of 5 questions are asked, and the player who completes the mini-challenges the fastest, along with having the most correct answers, earns a Shield for themselves.	No time limit	€1,500	€2,000	€21,900	Oyin
7	The four Death Row contestants were selected by the Traitors, including themselves, to be "kidnapped" and taken to a holding cell behind the Slane castle. The remaining contestants at the Breakfast will be split into 2 teams of 5 and find them as quickly as possible. Along the path they will encounter several intersections, each leading to two different paths based on a true-false question that each player answers beforehand about their castmates. If the team chooses the correct decision, they are one step closer to the end, whereas they will hit a dead end and have to travel back if they choose the wrong decision. The first team to find them will win €2,000 and get to choose one of the kidnapped players to be saved from Murder.	No time limit	€2,000	€2,000	€23,900	Christine
8	The contestants are divided into two teams of 6, where one team travel to the forest while the other stay at the castle. One team have to found the scrolls and get to hear a sound after doing the instruction on the scrolls. Team forest has to memorize and mimic the sound via a telephone box to team castle. Team castle then has to found a doll playing a sound that match and bring it to Siobhán. Each correctly identified doll will add €600 into the prize pot. The contestants have 30 minutes to found all of the correct dolls, but only team castle is eligible to win the only available shield located inside a castle room.	30 minutes	€3,000	€3,000	€26,900	Vanessa
9	The contestants took a long and slow walk to the Murdered contestant's final resting place; along the way, they were given a series of questions hinting at who was safe, allowing those who were the correct answer(s) to walk into the back procession instead of walking in the front, and eliminating them from consideration. The three contestants left (Ben, Christine and Faye) then stepped into coffins at the burial plot, with the group voting on who they believe was Murdered. If the majority could correctly guess which contestant was Murdered, they earned €2,000 for the prize pot.	No time limit	€0	€2,000	€26,900	None
10	The players travels to the Hill of Slane and try to win €3,000 for the prize pot. Each player had three lit torches placed behind them. Once blindfolded, players were called one by one to extinguish the torch of the player they trusted the least, if the target players has no more lit torches, the players had to extinguish another player's torch. The first player whom torches were all extinguished had to guess who had done so, and each correct guess will earn €1,000. The least trusted player also had an option of keep either the Shield or the Dagger, and handing out the other to one of the remaining players.	No time limit	€2,000	€3,000	€28,900	Kelley
11	The contestants were split into 3 pairs. Each pair (Ben/Nick, Faye/Kelley and Oyin/Vanessa) will sit opposite each other and be tied to a chair in a room. Whenever they are ready, they will yell to start the time and start counting. As time goes on, the sounds, noises, and voices of the eliminated players will be played to distract them from counting, while the lights dim and eventually turn off, causing darkness. When the players think they have counted the precise time, they will yell the signal to stop the timer and switch the light on. In order to win the Mission, they must count a total of 13 minutes and 13 seconds as close as possible, with a maximum of 60 seconds in between. If the pair manages to count to the nearest 13 minutes and 13 seconds, they will earn €2,000 for the pot.	No time limit	€4,000	€6,000	€32,900	None
12	The remaining contestants have 60 minutes to find 5 crystals representing the 5 basic elements and symbols: earth, fire, air, water, and spirit. In order to find them, the players had to follow a map, follow the instructions on the scrolls for each of the crystals, and memorize the clues on the symbols where the crystals were found. After they successfully find them, they can use the crystals to place them on the specific symbols they have encountered throughout the journey, unlocking the door to the Spire of Lloyd if all five crystals are placed correctly. If the players unlock the chest on top of the folly in time, they will add €10,000 to the final prize pot.	60 minutes	€10,000	€10,000	€42,900	None

== Episodes ==
No. overall	No. in series	Title	Original release date
1	1	"Episode 1"	31 August 2025
2	2	"Episode 2"	1 September 2025
3	3	"Episode 3"	2 September 2025
4	4	"Episode 4"	7 September 2025
5	5	"Episode 5"	8 September 2025
6	6	"Episode 6"	9 September 2025
7	7	"Episode 7"	14 September 2025
8	8	"Episode 8"	15 September 2025
9	9	"Episode 9"	16 September 2025
10	10	"Episode 10"	21 September 2025
11	11	"Episode 11"	22 September 2025
12	12	"Episode 12"	23 September 2025
