= Alex Vladimirov =

Australian dancer and choreographer

- Born: 23 July 1998 (age 27); Ukraine
- Occupations: Dancer; Choreographer
- Known for: Dancing with the Stars (Australian TV series)

Alexandra Vladimirov (born 23 July 1998) also known professionally as Alex Vladimirov, is a Ukrainian-born ballroom and Latin dancer and choreographer from Melbourne, Australia.

== Early life ==
Vladimirov was born in Ukraine. The family moved to Cologne, Germany, when she was a child, before emigrating to Melbourne, Australia when she was 14.

== Career ==
Vladimirov's competitive dance career began in Germany at the age of 6. She originally partnered Michael Rödelbronn and Alexei Muzykin to little success. Between 2011 and 2012, Vladimirov partnered Yuri Schaum in which she earned reasonable success including four top twenty placements, their best being a 12th-place finish in at the WDSF Open on 17 June 2012.

Following her emigration to Australia at 14, Vladimirov continued her dance career to more success partnering Andrew Nolo.

In 2017, Vladimirov joined the cast of the touring dance company, Burn the Floor. In 2019, she joined Strictly Come Dancing professional dancer, Giovanni Pernice's 'Made in Italy' tour. In 2024, she joined AJ and Curtis Pritchard's 'Come What May' tour.

== Dancing with the Stars ==
=== Australia ===
In 2019, Vladimirov joined the cast of the Australian version of the dance competition programme, Dancing with the Stars as a professional dancer. Her first season saw her partner Giggle and Hoot presenter, Jimmy Rees. The couple reached the seventh week of the competition before Rees was forced to withdraw when one of his children became ill. They, therefore, finished in fifth place.

In 2020, Vladimirov returned for a second season partnering Married at First Sight personality, Dean Wells. They were the first couple to be eliminated.

In 2021, Vladimirov partnered Dancing with the Stars season 2 champion, TV presenter, Tom Williams. They reached Week 5 of the competition before being eliminated in a double vote-off.

In 2022, Vladimirov returned for her fourth consecutive season, partnering another former champion, Dancing with the Stars season 14's Australian rules footballer, David Rodan. The couple reached the grand finale becoming one of the four couples finishing in joint-third place.

Vladimirov did not feature in the 2023 season but did return for the 2024 in which she partnered SAS Australia: Who Dares Wins presenter, Ant Middleton. The couple reached the final, finishing in third place.

Series	Partner	Place
16	Jimmy Rees	5th
17	Dean Wells	10th
18	Tom Williams	10th
19	David Rodan	3rd
21	Ant Middleton	3rd

=== Ireland ===
In 2025, Vladimirov joined the cast of the Irish version of Dancing with the Stars as a professional dancer. For her first series, she was partnered with Taekwondo athlete, Jack Woolley.

Vladimirov returned to the ninth series in 2026. She was partnered with podcaster, Amber Wilson.

Series	Partner	Place
8	Jack Woolley	2nd
9	Amber Wilson	10th

==== Series 8 (2025) ====
Celebrity partner
Jack Woolley; Average: 35.8 Place: 2nd

Week No.	Dance/Song	Judges' score				Total	Result
Week No.	Dance/Song	Redmond	Byrne	Barry	Gourounlian	Total	Result
1	Viennese Waltz / "Die with a Smile"	7	8	7	8	30	No elimination
2	Cha-cha-cha / "Rush"	8	8	8	8	32	No elimination
3	Jive / "Stay"	8	8	8	9	33	Safe
4	Tango / "The Joker"	7	8	-	8	23	Safe
5	American Smooth / "Grace"	9	10	9	10	38	Safe; Granted immunity
6	Paso Doble / "Cha Cha Cha"	8	9	9	9	35	Safe
7	Contemporary Ballroom / "You've Got The Love"	10	10	10	10	40	Safe
8	Samba / "The Cup of Life"	9	9	9	10	37	Safe
9	Quickstep / "Austin (Boots Stop Workin')"; Team Dance / "Footloose"	8; 8	9; 9	9; 9	9; 9	35; 35	Safe
10	Salsa / "Red Alert"; Scare-a-thon / "Time Warp"	10; Couple	10 awarded	10; 4	10 points	40; 44	Bottom two
11	American Smooth / "Grace"; Showdance / "The Edge of Glory"	10; 10	10; 10	10; 10	10; 10	40; 40	Runners-up

==== Series 9 (2026) ====
Celebrity partner
Amber Wilson; Average: TBA Place: TBA
