= The Traitors Ireland series 2 =

2026 series of The Traitors Ireland

The Traitors Ireland
- Series 2
- Promotional poster
- Presented by: Siobhán McSweeney
- No. of contestants: 23
- Winners: Anna Murphy; Diego Caixeta
- Location: Slane Castle, Slane, County Meath, Ireland
- Companion show: The Traitors Ireland: Uncloaked
- No. of episodes: 12

Release
- Original network: RTÉ One
- Original release: 30 August – 22 September 2026

Series chronology
- ← Previous; Series 1

The second series of The Traitors Ireland was first broadcast on RTÉ One on 30 August 2026. The series concluded on 22 September 2026 where Anna Murphy and Diego Caixeta won as Faithfuls.

== Format ==
Over twenty contestants arrive at a castle in Meath where they will spend their entire time for the duration of the game. On the arrival day, host Siobhán McSweeney picks at least three contestants to be called "Traitors" and the rest are automatically called "Faithful".

At the end of each day, all contestants meet at a Round Table to discuss who they think are Traitors. They then cast votes that are revealed one by one. The person with the most votes reveals their identity and is immediately banished. On most nights, the Traitors meet in private and agree to "murder" one Faithful who leaves the game immediately. The remaining Faithful only know who has been murdered at breakfast next morning.

Each day, the group participates in missions to win money for the prize fund which can reach up to €50,000 by the end of the game. During the missions, any contestant may separately win a shield that awards that player immunity from being murdered, but not from being banished. In some cases, the contestant has the right or ability not to disclose if they won the shield, or to tell a restricted group.

If during the game the number of Traitors drops to two, they are given the option to "seduce" or recruit a Faithful to join them instead of murdering. Seduced Faithfuls may decline and can decide whether to tell the other Faithfuls of the attempted seduction. If only one Traitor remains, the seduction happens as a face-to-face ultimatum; if the player declines they are immediately murdered, and if they accept the pair can immediately murder another Faithful.

== Contestants ==
Contestants were revealed on 30 August 2026, shortly before the premiere of the series. In a minor twist, Diego Caixeta and Denis Ryan had a pre-existing relationship as they were married before competing in the series.

List of The Traitors Ireland contestants
Contestant	Age	Residence	Occupation	Affiliation	Finish
Emma Wigglesworth	42	Dublin	Vocal Coach	Faithful	Murdered (Episode 2)
Edelle McDaid	44	Culdaff	Software Operations Lead	Traitor (Note: Edelle was recruited as a Traitor in Episode 2.)	Banished (Episode 2)
Laura Howard	39	Fermoy	Regional Sales Manager	Faithful	Murdered (Episode 3)
Sean Adair	59	Claremorris	Emergency Management Officer	Faithful	Banished (Episode 3)
Saoirse Joyce	29	Galway	HR Specialist	Faithful	Murdered (Episode 4)
Fionula Linehan	61	Ballyphehane	Actor and Drama Teacher	Traitor	Banished (Episode 4)
Páraic Kerrigan	33	Maynooth	Assistant Professor	Traitor	Banished (Episode 5)
Denis Ryan	39	Cork	Writer & Psychotherapist	Faithful	Murdered (Episode 6)
Gráinne McGarry	59	Knocknahur	Horse Riding Instructor	Faithful	Withdrew (Episode 6)
Aoife Meehan	28	Dublin	Trainee Fashion Buyer	Traitor (Note: Aoife was recruited as a Traitor in Episode 6.)	Banished (Episode 6)
Sam Omukoro	28	Athlone	IT Support Analyst	Faithful	Murdered (Episode 7)
David Moran	45	Dublin	Stay-at-home Dad	Faithful	Banished (Episode 7)
Seán Cooke	33	Carlow	Call Centre Trainer	Faithful	Murdered (Episode 8)
Donal Casey	24	Leitrim	Teacher	Faithful	Banished (Episode 8)
Janet Takuz	35	Rathmines	Concept Designer	Faithful	Murdered (Episode 9)
DJ O'Sullivan	39	Newmarket	Car Salesman	Faithful	Banished (Episode 9)
Ian Kelly	34	Dublin	Civil Servant	Faithful	Banished (Episode 10)
Kayleigh Mooney	33	Dublin	Teacher	Faithful	Murdered (Episode 11)
Pete O'Flynn	43	Passage West	Irish Defence Forces	Faithful	Banished (Episode 11)
Carla Geary	27	Ballymun	Early Years Educator	Traitor	Banished (Episode 12)
Pauric O’Meara	31	Borrisokane	Musician	Traitor (Note: Pauric O. was recruited as a Traitor in Episode 7.)	Banished (Episode 12)
Anna Murphy	27	Dublin	Postal Worker	Faithful	Winner (Episode 12)
Diego Caixeta	40	Cork	Physician Associate	Faithful	Winner (Episode 12)

== Elimination history ==
Key
The contestant was a Faithful
The contestant was a Traitor
The contestant was murdered by the traitors
The contestant was banished at the round table
The contestant withdrew from the show

Episode	2			3	4	5	6		7		8			9	10	11		12			
Traitors' Decision	Edelle	Denis; Emma; Kayleigh	Emma (Note: During the first episode, the Traitors were tasked to recruit one faithful to join them in the Conclave. This new Traitor would have the sole choice on who to murder from the shortlist provided by the Traitors. They chose Edelle to recruit, who chose to Emma to murder.)	Laura	Saoirse	Denis; DJ; Donal; Ian; Janet; Sam	Aoife	Denis	Pauric O.	Sam	Seán C.			Janet (Note: After the Round Table in Episode 8, the Traitors were tasked to murder someone in plain sight, The Traitors murdered Janet, However, the curse did not work immediately, so Janet was present at breakfast the next morning. The players were told that the victim would succumb to the curse at the end of the mission.)	Anna	Kayleigh		None			
Traitors' Decision	Recruit	Shortlist	Murder			Death Row (Note: Instead of selecting one Faithful to be murdered, the Traitors were asked to put six players on death row. The next night, only these players would be at risk of elimination.)	Blackmail (Note: Following Páraic K.’s banishment, Carla was allowed to give a Faithful an ultimatum: become a Traitor or be Murdered. She chose Aoife, who accepted the offer.)	Murder	Blackmail (Note: Following Aoife’s banishment, Carla was allowed to give a Faithful an ultimatum: become a Traitor or be Murdered. She chose Pauric O., who accepted the offer.)	Murder					Dagger (Note: The Traitors selected Anna to be awarded The Dagger, making her vote count twice at the round table.)	Murder		None			
Shield	Denis, Diego			Carla, Denis, Diego, Janet, Páraic K., Pauric O., Pete, Sam, Seán C.	David	Ian; Janet	DJ		Diego		Pete			None							
Banishment	Edelle			Sean A.	Fionula	Páraic K.	Aoife		David		Tie	Tie	Donal	DJ	Ian	Tie	Pete	Tie	Tie	Tie	Carla
Vote	12–8–2			17–3	13–3–1–1	15–1–1	13–1		10–1–1		3–3–3–1	3–3–1	6–2	6–2	5–2–1	2–2–1	2–1	2–2	1–1	1–1	2–0 (Note: As Anna and Carla remained tied, Diego and Pauric O. were presented with two chests, only one of which contained a dagger. The player who selected the chest with a dagger was granted two votes for whoever they banish. Diego received the dagger and banished Carla.)
Anna	DJ			Sean A.	Fionula	Páraic K.	Aoife		David		Diego	Carla	Donal	DJ	Ian (2)	Carla	Carla	Carla	No vote	No vote	No vote
Diego	DJ			Sean A.	Fionula	Páraic K.	Aoife		Janet		Donal	Donal	Donal	DJ	Ian	Pete	Pete	Carla	Carla	Carla	Carla (2)
Pauric O.	Edelle			Sean A.	Fionula	Páraic K.	Aoife		David		Kayleigh	Kayleigh	Donal	DJ	Anna	Anna	Pete	Anna	Anna	Anna	No vote
Carla	Edelle			Sean A.	Fionula	Páraic K.	Aoife		David		Kayleigh	No vote	No vote	DJ	Pete	Pete	No vote	Anna	No vote	No vote	No vote
Pete	Edelle			Sean A.	Fionula	Páraic K.	Aoife		David		Carla	Donal	Donal	DJ	Ian	Carla	No vote	Banished (Episode 11)			
Kayleigh	Pauric O.			Donal	Aoife	Páraic K.	Aoife		David		Donal	No vote	Donal	Pete	Ian	Murdered (Episode 11)					
Ian	Edelle			Sean A.	Fionula	Páraic K.	Aoife		David		Carla	Carla	Carla	DJ	Pete	Banished (Episode 10)					
DJ	Edelle			Sean A.	Aoife	Aoife	Aoife		David		Donal	Donal	Donal	Pete	Banished (Episode 9)						
Janet	DJ			Sean A.	Fionula	Páraic K.	Aoife		David		Carla	Carla	Carla	Murdered (Episode 9)							
Donal	DJ			Sean A.	Fionula	Páraic K.	Aoife		David		Kayleigh	No vote	No vote	Banished (Episode 8)							
Seán C.	Edelle			Sean A.	Fionula	Páraic K.	Aoife		David		Murdered (Episode 8)										
David	Edelle			Donal	Fionula	Páraic K.	Aoife		Pete		Banished (Episode 7)										
Sam	Edelle			Sean A.	Fionula	Páraic K.	Aoife		Murdered (Episode 7)												
Aoife	Pauric O.			Sean A.	Donal	Páraic K.	Carla		Banished (Episode 6)												
Gráinne	Edelle			Sean A.	Aoife	Páraic K.	Withdrew (Episode 6)														
Denis	Edelle			Sean A.	Fionula	Páraic K.	Murdered (Episode 6)														
Páraic K.	Edelle			Sean A.	Fionula	Donal	Banished (Episode 5)														
Fionula	DJ			Sean A.	Sam	Banished (Episode 4)															
Saoirse	DJ			Sean A.	Murdered (Episode 4)																
Sean A.	DJ			Donal	Banished (Episode 3)																
Laura	Edelle			Murdered (Episode 3)																	
Edelle	DJ			Banished (Episode 2)																	
Emma	Murdered (Episode 2)																				

=== End game ===
Episode	12		
Decision	Banish	Pauric O.	Game Over; Faithfuls Win
Vote	3–0	2–1	Game Over; Faithfuls Win
Anna	Banish	Pauric O.	Winners
Diego	Banish	Pauric O.	Winners
Pauric O.	Banish	Anna	Banished

== Missions ==
Episode	Task description	Time limit	Money earned	Money available	Running total	Shield winner(s)
1	Players must carry seven large stone slabs across a hilly course to a sacred circle and assemble them into an ancient Irish dolmen within 30 minutes. At various points along the route, players can sacrifice themselves and be shackled in place to claim a dolmen piece or a bag of money. Anyone inside the sacred circle when the fire is lit would be immune from murder.	30 minutes	€5,500	€6,500	€5,500	None
2	Each player picked a partner. They would dance around the hay chairs while the music played. When the music stopped the players could look for money or shields in the hay bales or sit down on the hay chairs. Players could only bank money if they sat on the hay chairs. Each round a hay chair was removed. There were four shields available. There were two hidden in the hay bales and two were awarded to the winning pair in the musical chairs.	No time limit	€1,400	€4,000	€6,900	Denis
2	Each player picked a partner. They would dance around the hay chairs while the music played. When the music stopped the players could look for money or shields in the hay bales or sit down on the hay chairs. Players could only bank money if they sat on the hay chairs. Each round a hay chair was removed. There were four shields available. There were two hidden in the hay bales and two were awarded to the winning pair in the musical chairs.	No time limit	€1,400	€4,000	€6,900	Diego
3	A player was selected before the mission started and would have 20 minutes to follow a map to free the other players from coffins. Coffins were scattered around the castle grounds in groups of four or five. Those saved from the coffins would join the searcher in finding the other players. Only a limited number of players could be let out from each group of coffins. The players at the end not in coffins would be awarded a shield and contribute €500 to the prize pot if they returned to the starting location.	20 minutes	€4,000	€4,000	€10,900	Carla
3		20 minutes	€4,000	€4,000	€10,900	Denis
3		20 minutes	€4,000	€4,000	€10,900	Diego
3		20 minutes	€4,000	€4,000	€10,900	Janet
3		20 minutes	€4,000	€4,000	€10,900	Páraic K.
3		20 minutes	€4,000	€4,000	€10,900	Pauric O.
3		20 minutes	€4,000	€4,000	€10,900	Pete
3		20 minutes	€4,000	€4,000	€10,900	Sam
3		20 minutes	€4,000	€4,000	€10,900	Seán C.
4	The players split into groups of three, with sheep running around the field, each tagged with the name of one of the players. The teams must identify the sheep on their ‘wanted’ poster and guess its correct name. For every correctly identified sheep, there’s an extra €1,000 into the prize fund. Each team must nominate one team member to try earn a shield for themselves.	No time limit	€2,000	€3,000	€12,900	David
5	The Traitors have put six players on death row in pairs: Denis and DJ, Donal and Sam, and Ian and Janet. The remaining players must choose one pair they want to save from death row. They will then compete in a quiz as Gaeilge, and those who get the answers right will earn money for their chosen pair. The pair with the most money at the end of the game will be saved from death row.		€4,500	€4,500	€17,400	Ian
5	The Traitors have put six players on death row in pairs: Denis and DJ, Donal and Sam, and Ian and Janet. The remaining players must choose one pair they want to save from death row. They will then compete in a quiz as Gaeilge, and those who get the answers right will earn money for their chosen pair. The pair with the most money at the end of the game will be saved from death row.		€4,500	€4,500	€17,400	Janet
6	Before they start the players split themselves into three groups. In the first part of the mission the players match the clues to the sheep. In the second part of the mission one player from each group tries to remove the shield from a sheep.		€2,900	€3,000	€20,550	DJ
7	Seven contestants selected by the traitors to stay outside to decide which of the seven coffins representing the seven deadly sins they belong to. There are clues to help the contestants. The other group of contestants are asked individually if they wish to pay €200 for a shield from the prize money. The players decided the order themselves.		€1,800	€3,500	€22,350	Diego
8	The players were blindfolded and taken to a hay shed, where they found themselves handcuffed beneath voodoo dolls bearing their names. They had to retrieve keys using magnets, free themselves and stab a doll to collect money, with the final untouched doll earning its player a shield.		€2,500	€2,500	€24,850	Pete
9			€2,000	€2,000	€26,850	None
10	Players were randomly drawn into three pairs with one player left out. The pairs start at opposite ends of steps. On each step there is a temptation, which one of the players will get if they drop the bag on the relevant step. If both players reach the top €2,000 will go into the prize pot. After the three pairs do they steps, the odd player out gets offered €2,000.	No time limit	€4,000	€6,000	€30,850	None
11	The players collect items to build up the prize pot and fill the well to block a murder.	20 minutes	€5,000	€6,000	€35,850	None
12			€10,000	€10,000	€45,850	None

== Episodes ==
No. overall	No. in series	Title	Original release date
13	1	"Episode 1"	30 August 2026
14	2	"Episode 2"	31 August 2026
15	3	"Episode 3"	1 September 2026
16	4	"Episode 4"	6 September 2026
17	5	"Episode 5"	7 September 2026
18	6	"Episode 6"	8 September 2026
19	7	"Episode 7"	13 September 2026
20	8	"Episode 8"	14 September 2026
21	9	"Episode 9"	15 September 2026
22	10	"Episode 10"	20 September 2026
23	11	"Episode 11"	21 September 2026
24	12	"Episode 12"	22 September 2026
