= Rebecca Scott (dancer) =

Australian dancer and choreographer

- Born: 5 January 1998 (age 28); Solihull, United Kingdom
- Occupations: Dancer; Choreographer
- Known for: Got to Dance; Dancing with the Stars (Irish TV series)

Rebecca Scott (born 5 January 1998) is a British-born ballroom and Latin dancer and choreographer from Solihull, England.

== Early life ==
Scott was born in Solihull, England. From the age of three she trained in ballet and tap dance before beginning Latin and Ballroom at the age of six.

== Career ==
Scott's competitive dance career began at a young age. In 2009, Scott and, her then partner, Lloyd Perry won the Open World Juvenile Under 12 Ballroom Championship. In 2015, Scott and Perry won the Open World Youth Under 19 Latin Championship. In 2017, the pair were runners-up in the WDC AL European Under 21 Latin Championship. In 2017, the couple won WDC AL SuperLeague Latin Youth Championship. In 2018, the couple reached the quarter-final of the 93rd Blackpool Dance Festival in the Amateur Latin category. Other titles include World Under 21 Latin Finalists, World Under 19 Latin Champions, British Closed Under 16 Ballroom Champions, 2x British Closed Under 16 Latin Champions, British Open Under 16 Finalists, World Under 12 Ballroom Champions, British Closed Under 12 Ballroom & Latin Champions and British Open Under 12 Finalists.

In 2023 she joined the touring dance troupe, Burn the Floor.

== Television career ==
=== Got to Dance ===
Scott and Perry both appeared on the third series of the Sky One dance competition programme, Got to Dance. The couple reached the semi-finals of the competition where they received a perfect score from the judges.

=== Dancing with the Stars ===
On 16 December 2024, Scott was confirmed as one of the professional dancers taking part in the eighth season of the Irish version of Dancing with the Stars. She danced with chef and TV personality, Kevin Dundon. Despite receiving some of the lowest scores every week and backlash from viewers when they outlasted other couples, Dundon and Scott reached the quarterfinals, finishing in sixth place.

Scott returned for the ninth season in 2026 where she was partnered with The Apprentice star, Jordan Dargan.

Series	Partner	Place
8	Kevin Dundon	6th
9	Jordan Dargan	5th

==== Series 8 (2025) ====
Celebrity partner
Kevin Dundon; Average: 19.0 Place: 6th

Week No.	Dance/Song	Judges' score				Total	Result
Week No.	Dance/Song	Redmond	Byrne	Barry	Gourounlian	Total	Result
1	American Smooth / "Everybody Eats When They Come to My House"	3	5	4	5	17	No elimination
2	Samba / "Volare"	2	4	3	4	13	No elimination
3	Quickstep / "Soda Pop"	4	5	4	5	18	Safe
4	Jive / "I'm a Believer"	2	3	-	3	8	Safe
5	Tango / "Let's Dance"	5	6	5	6	22	Safe
6	Waltz / "Amar pelos dois"	6	6	7	6	25	Safe
7	Paso Doble / "You Give Love a Bad Name"	5	5	5	5	20	Safe
8	Foxtrot / "Livin' Thing"	6	6	6	6	24	Safe
9	Charleston / "Rompin' Stompin'"; Team Dance / "Footloose"	5; 8	5; 9	5; 9	6; 9	21; 35	Eliminated

==== Series 9 (2026) ====
Celebrity partner
Jordan Dargan; Average: TBA Place: TBA
