= Eric Robertson =

Eric Robertson may refer to:

- Eric Robertson (literary critic), professor at Royal Holloway, University of London
- Eric Robertson (athlete) (1892–1975), British athlete
- Eric Robertson (composer) (born 1948), Scottish composer, organist, pianist, and record producer
- Eric Robertson (politician) (1963–2026), American law enforcement officer and politician from Washington
- Eric Sutherland Robertson (1857–1926), Scottish man of letters, academic in India, and clergyman

== See also ==
- E. R. Dodds (Eric Robertson Dodds, 1893–1979), Irish historian
- Erik Robertson (born 1984), American football guard
- Eric Roberson (born 1976), American R&B and soul singer-songwriter
- Eric Roberts (disambiguation)
