= Spencer Matthews =

British television personality and entrepreneur (born 1988)

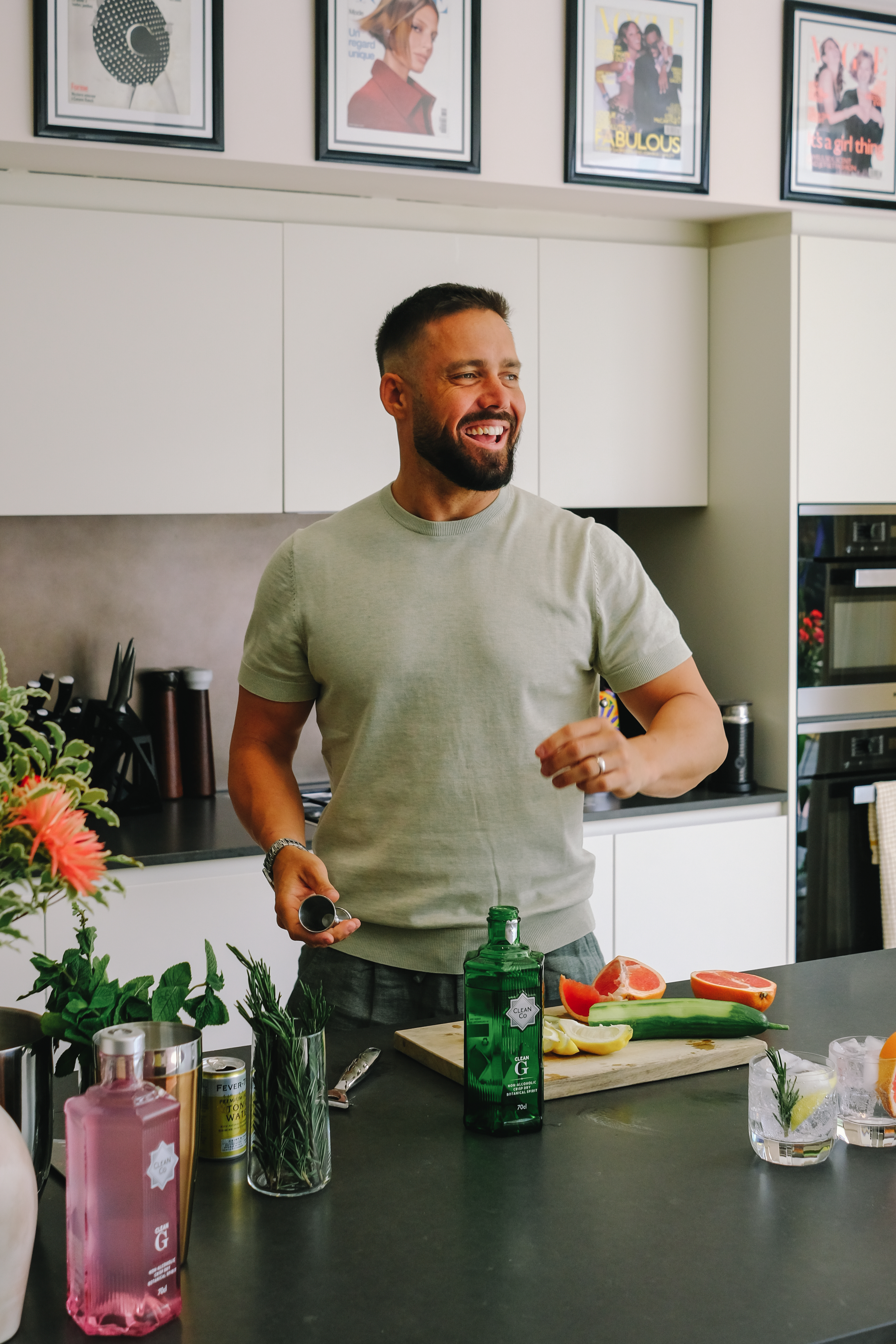
- Born: Spencer George Matthews; 6 August 1988 (age 38); Grantham, Lincolnshire, England
- Education: Eton College
- Occupations: Television personality, entrepreneur
- Spouse: Vogue Williams (m. 2018)
- Children: 4
- Relatives: James Matthews (brother); Pippa Middleton (sister-in-law); Amber Wilson (sister-in-law)

Spencer George Matthews (born 6 August 1988) is a British television personality and entrepreneur, known for his appearances on Made in Chelsea. He has also appeared on other television shows such as Celebrity MasterChef and The Jump. He is the founder and CBO of CleanCo non-alcoholic spirits. In 2024, Matthews became a Guinness World Records holder, when he completed thirty marathons in thirty days for charity.

== Early life ==
Matthews was born in Grantham, Lincolnshire and is the third son of landowner and entrepreneur David Matthews, from his second marriage, to Rhodesian-born artist Jane Spencer Parker. His mother was educated at the Slade School of Art. He is named after his maternal grandfather, Robert Spencer Parker, an architect. He has an older half-sister, Nina, and two older brothers, James and Michael, the latter of whom died at age 22 in 1999 while scaling Mount Everest.

The family owned Caunton Manor, a 30-acre (12 ha) estate in Nottinghamshire, and Eden Rock in Saint Barthélemy, sometimes described as one of the "top 100 resorts in the world". Matthews split his childhood between the two residences.

He was educated at Eton College. Matthews attended the University of Southern California, where he studied cinema and television with the aim of becoming an artist; he dropped out after nine months.

In 2007, upon purchasing a 10,000-acre (4,000 ha) estate with hunting lodge in Scotland, his parents acquired the Scottish courtesy titles of Laird and Lady of Glen Affric.

== Career ==
Matthews came into the public eye through the E4 ‘constructed reality’ show Made in Chelsea. In 2017, he won the fourth series of Channel 4's competition show, The Jump. In 2018, he participated in and reached the final of Celebrity Masterchef. The same year, he became the face of Cartoon Network's Ben 10 Deluxe Omnitrix Watch.

2019 saw Matthews work alongside his wife on their own E4 show Spencer, Vogue and Baby Too. The show was renewed for a second series.

Matthews is the founder of CleanCo, which sells non-alcohol spirit alternatives and focuses around the concept of living a 'Life Less Wasted'. He started CleanCo following his own journey into sobriety following the birth of his first child and becoming aware of a lack of sophisticated options for those choosing not to drink alcohol.

Matthews has presented for the BBC's Watchdog, appeared in a CBeebies 2019 marketing campaign and worked with the Agricultural and Horticultural Development Board. With his family's agreement, Matthews embarked on a journey to Mount Everest in an attempt to recover the body of his brother Michael. The journey was recorded in the form of a documentary titled Finding Michael, which premiered on Disney+ in 2023.

== Personal life ==
Matthews was christened Anglican and says he was "brought up Church of England, but not in a practising manner". He took part in the Pilgrimage BBC Two series, in 2024, with six other celebrities. He described himself then as spiritual but not religious, and questioned the existence of Jesus and his attributed miracles.

Matthews married Irish model and media personality Vogue Williams on 9 June 2018 at his family's Glen Affric estate. They have a son born in September 2018; a daughter born in July 2020; a son born in April 2022, and a son born in September 2026. Their first two children were christened Church of England, while the third was christened Catholic.

Matthews achieved a blue belt in Brazilian jiu-jitsu in 2020 after training for 15 months.

In 2016, Matthews admitted that he had previously used anabolic steroids. The previous year, he had been asked to leave the fifteenth series of I'm a Celebrity...Get Me Out of Here! due to his consumption of steroid pills while participating as a contestant in the series.

=== Guinness World Records ===
In August 2024, Matthews broke a marathon World Record, by completing thirty marathons in thirty days. He undertook the campaign in Jordan, West Asia. He describes himself as an 'extreme endurance athlete'.

== Publications ==
Matthews, Spencer (27 April 2014). Confessions of a Chelsea Boy: The Autobiography. Sidgwick and Jackson. pp 272 ISBN 9781447242703.
