= The Apprentice (British TV series) series 19 =

Nineteenth series of The Apprentice (UK)

The Apprentice
- Series 19
- Starring: Alan Sugar; Karren Brady; Tim Campbell
- No. of episodes: 12

Release
- Original network: BBC One
- Original release: 30 January – 17 April 2025

Series chronology
- ← Previous; Series 18 Next → Series 20

The nineteenth series of British reality television series The Apprentice (UK) premiered on 30 January 2025 in the UK on BBC One. Karren Brady and Tim Campbell also return as Lord Sugar's aides.

The series concluded on 17 April 2025, with Dean Franklin emerging as the overall winner with Anisa Khan as the runner-up. Dean is also the show's first male winner since James White on Series 13 and the first solo male winner since Joseph Valente on Series 11.

== Production ==
In January 2024, whilst the previous series was airing, the BBC announced applications were open for the nineteenth series. The applications closed on 17 February 2024. To coincide the show's 20th anniversary, the BBC confirmed that the series will again feature eighteen candidates, as well as revealing several of the tasks set to feature across the series including "creating a virtual popstar, turning a ton of potatoes and tomatoes into cash, designing and marketing Easter Eggs, jetting off to Turkey for a corporate hospitality challenge and taking on a discount buying task in Stratford-upon-Avon". The first trailer for the series was released in January 2025, which teased the series as the "most demanding yet".

== Series overview ==
The eighteen candidates appearing in the nineteenth series were announced on 19 January 2025. The first task saw the candidates being formed into mixed gender teams, with neither team having an official name until the fourth episode; the two teams were unofficially referred to as "Team Forest" and "Team Glacier" on the first task. Eventually, by Week 4, "Team Glacier" adopted the name Ascendancy and "Team Forest" adopted the name Parallel.

=== Candidates ===
| Candidate | Background | Age | Result |
|---|---|---|---|
| Dean Franklin | Air conditioning company owner | 34 | Winner |
| Anisa Khan | Pizza company owner | 26 | Runner-up |
| Jordan Dargan | Animation entrepreneur | 21 | Fired in the interviews stage |
| Chisola Chitambala | Virtual assistant company owner | 31 | Fired in the interviews stage |
| Amber-Rose Badrudin | Convenience store owner | 24 | Fired in the interviews stage |
| Mia Collins | Meal prep entrepreneur | 25 | Fired in the tenth task |
| Liam Snellin | Workwear brand owner | 28 | Fired in the tenth task |
| Max England | Senior account manager | 30 | Fired in the ninth task |
| Emma Street | Corporate project manager | 23 | Fired in the eighth task |
| Melica Moshiri | Tech recruitment company owner | 32 | Fired in the eighth task |
| Keir Shave | Telemarketing company owner | 26 | Fired in the seventh task |
| Frederick Afrifa | Motivational speaker & former athlete | 28 | Fired in the seventh task |
| Jonny Heaver | Tutoring company owner | 23 | Fired in the sixth task |
| Jana Denzel | Cosmetic dentist | 33 | Left after the fifth task |
| Nadia Suliaman | Salon chain owner | 35 | Fired in the fourth task |
| Carlo Brancati | Hair transplant consultant | 37 | Fired in the third task |
| Aoibheann Walsh | Hair and beauty salon owner | 36 | Fired in the second task |
| Emma Rothwell | Online gift store owner | 29 | Fired in the first task |

== Performance chart ==
Task Number
| Candidate | 1 | 2 | 3 | 4 | 5 | 6 | 7 | 8 | 9 | 10 | 11 | 12 |
|---|---|---|---|---|---|---|---|---|---|---|---|---|
| Dean | BR | IN | WIN | IN | IN | IN | BR | BR | BR | IN | IN | HIRED |
| Anisa | LOSE | WIN | LOSS | LOSS | LOSS | LOSS | BR | BR | IN | BR | IN | RUNNER-UP |
| Jordan | IN | LOSS | IN | IN | IN | IN | WIN | LOSS | IN | LOSE | FIRED | |
| Chisola | LOSS | IN | LOSS | LOSS | LOSS | LOSE | IN | LOSS | BR | WIN | FIRED | |
| Amber-Rose | IN | LOSE | IN | IN | IN | IN | IN | LOSE | LOSS | IN | FIRED | |
| Mia | IN | LOSS | IN | WIN | IN | IN | BR | LOSE | IN | FIRED | | |
| Liam | IN | LOSS | BR | LOSS | LOSS | LOSS | IN | LOSS | WIN | FIRED | | |
| Max | LOSS | IN | LOSE | LOSS | IN | IN | IN | LOSS | FIRED | | | |
| Emma S. | WIN | LOSS | IN | IN | LOSS | LOSS | IN | FIRED | | | | |
| Melica | BR | IN | IN | IN | WIN | IN | BR | FIRED | | | | |
| Keir | BR | IN | LOSS | BR | IN | WIN | FIRED | | | | | |
| Frederick | IN | LOSS | IN | IN | LOSS | BR | FIRED | | | | | |
| Jonny | IN | LOSS | IN | IN | LOSS | FIRED | | | | | | |
| Jana | LOSS | IN | LOSS | BR | LEFT | | | | | | | |
| Nadia | IN | BR | LOSS | FIRED | | | | | | | | |
| Carlo | BR | IN | FIRED | | | | | | | | | |
| Aoibheann | IN | FIRED | | | | | | | | | | |
| Emma R. | FIRED | | | | | | | | | | | |

HIRED The candidate won this series of The Apprentice.
RUNNER-UP The candidate was the runner-up.
WIN The candidate won as project manager on their team, for this task.
LOSE The candidate lost as project manager on their team, for this task.
IN The candidate was on the winning team for this task / passed the Interviews stage.
LOSS The candidate was on the losing team for this task.
BR The candidate was brought to the final boardroom for this task.
FIRED The candidate was fired in this task.
FIRED The candidate lost as project manager for this task and was fired.
LEFT The candidate left the process but were deemed culpable for their team’s loss as project manager.

== Episodes ==
| No. overall | No. in series | Title | Original release date | UK viewers (millions) |
|---|---|---|---|---|
| 249 | 1 | "Austria Tours" | 30 January 2025 | 5.76 |
Lord Sugar begins his search for a new business partner for 2025 amongst eighteen new candidates. For their first task, the teams are sent to Innsbruck, Austria and challenged to create an enjoyable tour for tourists. Team 1 focus on a cycling tour through forests; despite including yodelling and tree hugging, their sales strategy suffers from poor sales and pricing. Team 2 focus on an Alpine mountain tour; despite selling out, the team focus on cheaper sale prices than agreed upon. In the boardroom, Team 2 wins by making a profit, with Team 1 scrutinised over their flawed sales strategy that gave them a net loss. Amongst the six told to stay in the boardroom, Emma Rothwell becomes the first to be fired for lack of sales and a weak defense for her performance.
| 250 | 2 | "Virtual Pop Star" | 6 February 2025 | 5.35 |
Teams find their next task requires them to create their own virtual pop star, them pitching their concept in hopes of securing sponsership deals with major brands. Team 1 created a pop star called Bami, but find their design criticised, while their breach the rules on some of their sales. Team 2 create a pop star duo called Fred and Naz, but face criticism on the pair's artificial intelligence-generated voices. In the boardroom, Team 1 manage to secure the most sponsership money despite their mistakes, with Team 2 facing scrutiny on their performance. Of the final three, Aoibheann Walsh is dismissed for the poorly chosen AI-generated vocals and her lack of contributions by this point.
| 251 | 3 | "Discount Buying" | 13 February 2025 | 5.70 |
The candidates are sent to Stratford-upon-Avon, in order to purchase a list of nine items, associated with William Shakespeare for the cheapest prices. Neither team performs well, as along with poor planning and strategy, each team purchase a single item that is incorrect. However, Team 1 loses the task due to a higher spend from fines, including from lateness, leading to them facing scrutiny on their performance. Of the final three, Carlo Brancati is fired for his consistently weak contributions, along with his disruptive influence amongst the team he performed in.
| 252 | 4 | "Crops to Cash" | 20 February 2025 | 5.89 |
Each team, after choosing a name for themselves, is challenged to make money from an assigned produce - a takeaway meal for public trade, and a bespoke order for a corporate client, along with selling excess produce to traders. Ascendancy is given tomatoes; despite badly under-delivering to their corporate cilent, the team manage to maintain good cost control and overall sales to the public with their chosen meal. Parallel is given potatoes, but suffer badly from disagreements with the project manager on meal choice and quality control, resulting in overspends on ingredients and a difficult meal to sell. In the boardroom, Ascendency win for making a profit, while Parallel is scrutinised on their failure. Amongst the final three, Lord Sugar fires Nadia Suliaman after deeming her culpable for her team's loss due to her poor leadership, her decisions, and failing to heed concerns from the others.
| 253 | 5 | "Easter Eggs" | 27 February 2025 | 6.01 |
The two teams are tasked with creating Easter eggs that will stand out in a crowded market, and sell them to major retailers. Ascendancy create an egg using a luxury tea flavour; despite criticism on its appearance, it receive good feedback on the concept and taste. Parallel focus on a space-themed chocolate egg complete with an accompanying character for its promotion, but retailers question the unclear messaging, while criticising the egg's design. In the boardroom, Jana Denzel surprises everyone by resigning from the process before the results are announced; Ascendancy are later revealed to have won the task for securing orders. For the remainder of Parallel, Lord Sugar keeps them in the process, after he determines Jana's poor leadership and concept were to blame for their loss.
| 254 | 6 | "Turkey Corporate Hospitality" | 6 March 2025 | 5.85 |
The teams are sent to Turkey, where their next task is hosting a quality corporate hospitality event for a client, including catering. Ascendancy host a hot air ballooning tour in Cappadocia, yet despite minor criticism on catering, providing a satisfying experiences for their clients. Parallel host a mountain tour in Bodrum, but are heavily criticised for a dull experience, poor catering, and a poor team building exercise. In the boardroom, Parallel lose the task after their mistakes lead to their client asking for a large refund, leaving their performance to be scrutinised. Amongst the final three, Jonny Heaver is dismissed for his poor hosting skills, and his general lack of contributions throughout the process.
| 255 | 7 | "Kids' Banking" | 13 March 2025 | 5.80 |
Lord Sugar assigns the teams the challenge of creating a new banking app for six-to-nine-year-olds, along with an accompanying money box, and securing investment for their concept. Ascendancy design their app and money box around a dog mascot, but face concerns over the lack of financial education in the app and the concept being aimed at the wrong age group. Parallel opt for a pot-of-gold designed money box and quiz-based app featuring a superhero character, but face a lack of co-ordination on their creations. In the boardroom, Ascendancy fails to secure investment, facing criticism on their performance. Among the losing team, Lord Sugar fires Frederick Afrifa before the final boardroom for his poor leadership, before later dismissing Keir Shave for his poor pitching skills that contributed to the team's failure.
| 256 | 8 | "Hot Sauce" | 20 March 2025 | 5.53 |
The teams find their next task is to create their own hot sauce, including branding, before pitching their concept to industry experts. Ascendency create a sauce with South-East Asian flavours and abrand focused on bougie, but face issues with a viscous sauce and confusion over name, as well as an advert not featuring the sauce. Parallel create a spicy sauce with a brand targetting thrill seekers, but face criticism over their choice of flavour, a poor advert, and a weak brand. In the boardroom, Lord Sugar deems neither team the winner, leaving three members from each to face scrutiny over their poor performance. Amongst Parallel, Melica Moshiri is dismissed for her continued disruption over the past few tasks, and amongst Ascendency, Emma Street is fired for her lack of contribution across the previous tasks.
| 257 | 9 | "TV Selling" | 27 March 2025 | 5.46 |
The teams find themselves instructed to choose products that they will then sell during a primetime slot on a shopping channel, with Lord Sugar himself watching proceedings. Ascendancy opt for a number of home appliances, but face issues from problematic presentations, poor demonstrations and a lack of information. Parallel choose a variety of specialised products, but face issues with their selection, along with providing inaccurate and false information. In the boardroom, Ascendancy win the task through higher confirmed sale figures, leaving Parallel to be questioned on their performance. Amongst the final three, Max England is dismissed from the process, for his responsibility on product selection, and his failure to lead a team successfully for a second time.
| 258 | 10 | "Fashion" | 3 April 2025 | 5.29 |
Lord Sugar assigns the teams to each launch an environmentally conscious fashion brand, pitching their creations to major fashion retailers and securing orders. Ascendancy opt for a line of skirts and crop tops aimed at men, but face criticism for their products being too niche. Parallel focus on a more conventional, conservative fashion, but face concerns their designs do not stand out in the market. In the boardroom, Ascendancy lose the task, after Parallel secures double their sales figures, leaving the team facing questions on their decisions. Amongst the losing team, Lord Sugar fires Liam Snellin for his lack of enthusiastic approach to the task after failing to become Project Manager, and Mia Collins, for being responsible for the poor design of the product line that doomed the task.
| 259 | 11 | "Interviews" | 10 April 2025 | 5.39 |
After facing ten tasks as teams, the remaining five candidates now compete as individuals in their next task – a series of tough, gruelling interviews with some of Lord Sugar's closest associates: Claudine Collins, Claude Littner, Mike Soutar and Linda Plant. Each member faces scrutiny over their backgrounds, work experience, track record, and business proposals. Feedback to Lord Sugar, alongside observations by his aides, leads him to firing: Amber-Rose Badrudin, for offering nothing unique in a competitive market; Chisola Chitambala for proposing a business she has no experience in; and Jordan Dargan, for entering the process too early, though being given Sugar's contact details for investment opportunities in the future. Of the final two, Dean Franklin is commended for having a growing profitable business in a high-demand industry, while Anisa Khan is complimented for offering a product that could compete in a crowded market.
| 260 | 12 | "The Final" | 17 April 2025 | 5.53 |
After facing a multitude of business tasks and a tough interview, the two finalists, aided by old colleagues, face the task of launching their respective new businesses, produce advertising campaigns and pitching their businesses to a series of industry experts. Dean works to present his plan for an expanded air conditioning business. Anisa works to unveil a new range of pizzas. Based on feedback from those presentations, Lord Sugar chooses Dean Franklin as his business partner for 2025 for offering a lucrative proposal, leaving Anisa Khan as runner-up due to concerns over the scalability of her proposal.
