= Lawrence Rosenberg =

English television personality

- Rosenberg in May 2026
- Born: 1997 (age 28–29); Watford, Hertfordshire, England
- Education: Yavneh College; University of Manchester
- Occupations: Public relations specialist; broadcaster; writer; media personality

Lawrence Rosenberg (born 1997) is an English public relations specialist and television personality, known for appearing on the twentieth series of the British reality television series The Apprentice.

== Early life and education ==
Born and raised in Watford, Hertfordshire, Rosenberg was educated at Yavneh College. He later studied politics and modern history at the University of Manchester and was the president of its Jewish Society. He was also the campus representative for Jewish education charity Aish UK and a JLGB leader.

== Career ==
=== Public relations ===
After graduating from university, Rosenberg joined London-based public relations and communications agency Spreckley as an account manager and deputy new business manager. He led the media launch for Pocket Planet, a visitor attraction planned for Oxford Street. He also managed Spreckley's Startup Growth Hub and delivered public relations workshops for start-ups at the blockchain accelerator Block Dojo. In 2024, Rosenberg was named in PRWeek UK's 30 Under 30 list.

In 2025, he founded his own public relations firm, Rosenberg Media. Patricia Cullen of Entrepreneur UK wrote: "Whereas most PRs hide behind their clients, Rosenberg is quickly becoming one of the most well-known names in the comms industry." In 2026, Rosenberg was appointed managing director of Powerful Street, the strategic advisory firm founded and chaired by John Woodcock, Lord Walney.

=== The Apprentice ===
Rosenberg appeared on the UK version of The Apprentice in 2026, finishing in the final five. He described himself as hoping to "reinvent public relations for the modern era" through intelligent automation. In October 2026, he was announced as a participant in a promotional event for Signorelli's Broadgate bakery in London, with Rosenberg dressed as a croissant.

=== Broadcasting and political commentary ===
Rosenberg is a political commentator and regular contributor to GB News. He has appeared on Britain's Newsroom, as well as on LBC's Cross Question with Iain Dale, and has written political commentary for LBC.

== Personal life ==
Rosenberg is married to Lydia. He is also the captain of the Maccabi GB Southern Football League's Beitar Bushey Football Club.
