= Karishma Vijay =

English businessowner (born 1997)

- Born: April 1997 (age 29); Ashford, Surrey, England
- Education: St George's, University of London (BSc)
- Occupations: Businessowner; influencer
- Television: The Apprentice

TikTok information
- Page: Karishmua
- Years active: 2019–present
- Genres: Skincare; makeup
- Followers: 498,000
- Last updated: 8 April 2026
- Website: kishkin.com

Karishma Vijay (born April 1997) is an English businessowner and influencer. After founding the cosmetics company Kishkin, she won the twentieth series of the BBC competition series The Apprentice in 2026.

== Life and career ==
Vijay was born in April 1997 in Ashford, Surrey. She was born into an Indian-British family and is a Hindu. She was primarily raised by her father, who she considers a central figure in her life. Her family had a history of running successful businesses, but she said she is the first woman in her bloodline to take on this role. She described the first ten years of her life as "in extreme poverty".

Aged 24, Vijay was asked to make social media content for an agency, but convinced the owner she should be hired to revamp their online presence to appeal to young people. She worked there for five years, before starting the cosmetics company Kishkin. She became interested in the industry after discovering a type of rosehip oil could cure her acne. She founded the skincare infused beauty company to combat a growing trend of overconsumption of ineffective skincare and cosmetics. As well as a businesswoman, Vijay is also a social media influencer and posts skincare and cosmetics videos to apps including TikTok and Instagram.

In 2026, Vijay was announced as a contestant on the twentieth series of the BBC competition series The Apprentice. Her proposed business plan for Lord Sugar involved him investing into Kishkin to make it a "global obsession".

Vijay applied to be on The Apprentice after a large shipment of goods worth £25,000 for her business were involved in a ship capsizing following a typhoon in Hong Kong. She had used her entire life savings to start the business, and the goods were uninsured, so she hoped winning the show would rescue her financially. She has admitted that she had not seen The Apprentice regularly prior to her application, affirming that she was not on it as a fan, but as someone hoping to make their business a success.

Vijay quickly became a fan-favourite with viewers. She became the bookies' favourite to win the series, with Digital Spy billing her a "very strong asset". She ultimately won the competition and received the £250,000 investment from Lord Sugar. In response, Sugar said that Vijay was "a proper grafter" with "entrepreneurial spirit". Vijay said her participation in The Apprentice made her more confident and outgoing.

== Filmography ==
Year	Title	Role	Notes	Ref.
2026	The Apprentice	Winner	Series 20	
2026	This Morning	Guest	S38 E69	
2026	The Apprentice: Unfinished Business	Guest	Episode: "The Final"	
