= Eric Roberts (disambiguation) =

Eric Roberts (born 1956) is an American actor.

Eric Roberts may also refer to:

- Eric Roberts (bishop) (1914–1997), Welsh bishop
- Eric Roberts (politician), member of the Oklahoma House of Representatives
- Eric Roberts (spy) (1907–1972), British MI5 agent
- Eric S. Roberts, American computer scientist
- Eric Roberts (1910–1982), British comics artist, best known for his work for The Dandy and The Beano, such as Winker Watson
- Eric Roberts, musician with Gym Class Heroes
- Eric Roberts, Australian radio and broadcasting entrepreneur who owned Music Farm Studios in the 1990s
- Eric Roberts (television presenter) (born 1990), Irish broadcaster
