= Michael Fry (comedian) =

Irish comedian and musician

- Born: Matthew Dinneen

Comedy career
- Medium: Internet comedy
- Genre: Parody music

Matthew Dinneen, best known by his stage name Michael Fry, is an Irish comedian, actor and musician.

== Early life ==
The son of a mother from Donegal and a father from Salford, Fry grew up in Navan along with his three brothers. He studied at St Patrick's Classical School. While in school, he studied at the Gaiety School of Acting. He originally pursued a business degree at the University of Galway, but later moved to Trinity College.

== Career ==
=== Sketches ===
Fry started creating videos while living in Coleraine and working for Tourism Ireland, though he chose to use a pseudonym due to the company's social media policy. He chose the name "Michael Fry" as his Twitter account was named "@BigDirtyFry", and described Michael as "the most generic name he could think of". After a sketch Fry made about the Derry/Londonderry name dispute went viral, his Twitter following grew from 480 to 14,800.

Various sketches made by Fry have gone viral on social media, including his loose women sketch, parodies of a Liam Payne interview at the 2022 Oscars, Handforth Parish Council, 2021 and 2022 year-end versions of We Didn't Start the Fire, Conor McGregor and Irish mothers. Many of his sketches are done in the form of songs.

=== Acting and television ===
His first appearance on stage was at 16.

Fry appeared in Holding, the 2022 Virgin Media adaptation of Graham Norton's debut novel of the same name. Also in 2022, Fry made an appearance in an episode of Derry Girls as a train employee.

In 2022, Fry starred in a music video for Sorcha Richardson.

In September 2022, Fry starred alongside other Irish comedians, including Emma Doran and Justine Stafford, in RTÉ2's sketch show No Worries If Not!

Fry was announced as a contestant in the ninth series of the Irish version of Dancing with the Stars in December 2025. He was the first celebrity of the series to be eliminated.

=== Radio ===
In 2022, Fry was cast in the BBC Radio 4 sketch show Parish is Burning.

== Personal life ==
Fry has described himself as being "influenced by TV shows rather than individuals", such as Peep Show, The Office and Parks and Recreation.

Fry has participated in an initiative by Foras na Gaeilge for RTÉ Radio 1 to promote the learning of the Irish language. He has done ad campaigns for Permanent TSB.
