= The Apprentice (British TV series) series 18 =

The Apprentice
- Series 18
- Starring: Alan Sugar; Karren Brady; Tim Campbell
- No. of episodes: 12

Release
- Original network: BBC One
- Original release: 1 February – 18 April 2024

Series chronology
- ← Previous; Series 17 Next → Series 19

The eighteenth series of British reality television series The Apprentice (UK) premiered on 1 February 2024 in the UK on BBC One. Karren Brady and Tim Campbell returned as Lord Sugar's aides. The eighteen candidates competing in the series were revealed on 23 January 2024. The series concluded on 18 April 2024, with Rachel Woolford emerging as the overall winner, finishing over runner-up Phil Turner.

== Production ==
In January 2023, whilst the previous series was airing, the BBC announced applications were open for the eighteenth series. The applications closed on 29 January 2023. In November 2023, it was confirmed that the series would be pushed back to February 2024 instead of the usual slot due to the second series of The Traitors launching in January. The first teaser for the new series was revealed on 17 January 2024.

Before the series, Lord Sugar spoke during an interview with The Times announcing his plans to "tone down" the penultimate "interviews" episode for this series, following the controversy surrounding the interrogations from the interviewers in the previous series, which Sugar himself said he found "hard to watch." His aide Karren Brady defended the segment of the process however, insisting that she was not trying to upset the candidates, [during the interviews] however added that "resilience" was critical for running a successful business.

== Series overview ==
The two teams are named Supream and Nexus.

=== Candidates ===
Candidate	Background	Age	Result
Rachel Woolford	Boutique fitness studio owner	27	Winner
Phil Turner	Pie company owner	37	Runner-up
Paul Midha	Dental practice owner	29	Fired in the interviews stage
Florence "Flo" Edwards	Recruitment consultant	29	Fired in the interviews stage
Tre Lowe	Musician & wellness entrepreneur	48	Fired in the interviews stage
Steve Darken	Management consultant	37	Fired in the tenth task
Foluso Falade	Project manager	25	Fired in the tenth task
Maura Rath	Yoga company owner	33	Fired in the ninth task
Raj Chohan	Mortgage broker	41	Fired in the ninth task
Noor Bouziane	Jewellery company owner	22	Fired in the eighth task
Virdi Singh Mazaria	Music producer	24	Fired in the seventh task
Samantha "Sam" Saadet	Perinatal fitness coach	33	Fired in the sixth task
Onyeka Nweze	Chartered company secretary	25	Fired in the fifth task
Jack Davies	Recruitment director	29	Fired in the fourth task
Amina Khan	Pharmacist & business owner	32	Fired in the fourth task
Asif Munaf	Doctor & wellness brand owner	34	Fired in the third task
Paul Bowen	Pie company director	34	Fired in the second task
Oliver "Ollie" Medforth	Sales executive	27	Fired in the first task

=== Performance chart ===
Candidate	Task Number											
Candidate	1	2	3	4	5	6	7	8	9	10	11	12
Rachel	IN	IN	IN	IN	IN	IN	LOSE	LOSS	IN	LOSE	IN	HIRED
Phil	LOSS	LOSE	LOSS	BR	LOSS	BR	LOSS	LOSS	BR	WIN	IN	RUNNER-UP
Paul M.	LOSS	LOSS	IN	IN	LOSE	LOSS	IN	WIN	LOSS	IN	FIRED	
Flo	IN	IN	WIN	IN	LOSS	LOSS	IN	IN	BR	IN	FIRED	
Tre	LOSS	LOSS	IN	IN	WIN	IN	LOSS	LOSS	WIN	IN	FIRED	
Steve	BR	LOSS	IN	IN	IN	WIN	IN	IN	IN	FIRED		
Foluso	IN	WIN	IN	IN	IN	IN	BR	LOSS	IN	FIRED		
Maura	IN	IN	LOSS	BR	LOSS	BR	WIN	IN	FIRED			
Raj	IN	IN	IN	WIN	IN	IN	IN	IN	FIRED			
Noor	IN	IN	IN	IN	IN	IN	LOSS	FIRED				
Virdi	LOSE	LOSS	LOSS	BR	BR	LOSS	FIRED					
Sam	IN	IN	BR	BR	LOSS	FIRED						
Onyeka	WIN	IN	BR	BR	FIRED							
Jack	LOSS	LOSS	LOSS	FIRED								
Amina	IN	IN	BR	FIRED								
Asif	LOSS	BR	FIRED									
Paul B.	LOSS	FIRED										
Ollie	FIRED											

HIRED The candidate won this series of The Apprentice.
RUNNER-UP The candidate was the runner-up.
WIN The candidate won as project manager on their team, for this task.
LOSE The candidate lost as project manager on their team, for this task.
IN The candidate was on the winning team for this task / passed the Interviews stage.
LOSS The candidate was on the losing team for this task.
BR The candidate was brought to the final boardroom for this task.
FIRED The candidate was fired in this task.
FIRED The candidate lost as project manager for this task and was fired.

== Episodes ==
No. overall	No. in series	Title	Original release date	UK viewers (millions)
237	1	"Highlands Corporate Away Day"	1 February 2024	6.24
Lord Sugar begins his search for a new business partner for 2024 amongst eighteen new candidates. For their first task, the teams are sent to the Scottish Highlands challenged to host a corporate retreat at Cawdor Castle, including a tour, catering, and a team-building activity. The women focus on a tour of the Highlands' waterways with a team-building exercise themed on Highland games, serving fish cakes and rhubarb crumble for lunch, suffering a serious mistake due to a mix-up in their cooking. The men focus on a "land tour", serving toad in the hole and brownies for lunch, but do not impress with their poor time management and undercooked food. In the boardroom, the women win with a profit despite refunds, whilst the men face questions over their mistakes that left them suffering a loss. Of the final three, Oliver Medforth is the first to be fired for contributing too little to the task.
238	2	"Cheesecakes"	8 February 2024	6.32
The teams find themselves tasked by Lord Sugar to create two sets of mini cheesecakes; one set to punt to the public, and one set for a corporate client. The men create white chocolate cheesecakes for the public, and dragon fruit and avocado cheesecakes for their corporate clients; yet they face issues with costings, negotiations with their difficult clients, and selling prices. The women create mango cheesecakes for the public, and fig-flavoured cheesecakes for their clients; they sell well and control their costs, but face issues with logistics. In the boardroom, the women secure a larger profit over their opponents, leaving the men facing questions over their strategy. Out of the final three, Paul Bowen is dismissed for pushing the wrong type of cheesecake to his team's client in initial negotiations and for making too many mistakes on a task tailored to his line of work.
239	3	"Virtual Escape Rooms"	15 February 2024	6.05
The teams are mixed up and form names, as both sides find their next task is to create a new virtual Escape room - coming up with a concept, developing a demo, and then pitching their creation to industry experts. Nexus creates a medieval-style experience, themed around trying to create a cure for a Black Death-type plague, which is seen as having a feeling of resembling a game rather than an escape room. Supream creates an experience themed around survival on a deserted island, which is seen as being confusing. In the end, Nexus' concept is voted the best, with Supream being critiqued on its failure. Four of the team are called back, out of which Dr Asif Munaf is fired for not living up to his promises from his last boardroom appearance and not providing clear instructions to his team. Following the firing, Lord Sugar visits the candidates' house to inform them of the next task.
240	4	"Jersey Discount Buying"	22 February 2024	6.43
Lord Sugar sends the teams to Jersey to purchase a list of nine items associated with the island, for the cheapest price. Nexus manages to secure eight of the correct items, making good negotiations through a clear strategy, although waste time waiting around for certain items. Supream manages to secure seven items, but face severe issues from a clear lack of strategy, poor negotiations, and a poorly managed sub-team, resulting in fines for an incorrect item and lateness. In the boardroom, Supream's spending is revealed to be far greater than Nexus', leaving the entire team to face scrutiny by Lord Sugar over their dismal performance. Among the losing team, Lord Sugar dismisses Amina Khan, for her mismanagement of the sub-team and for being regarded as a weak contributor to the four tasks, and Jack Davies, for demonstrating weak leadership and strategic skills, and his poor track record.
241	5	"Formula E"	29 February 2024	6.03
Lord Sugar instructs the teams to come up with a concept for a new Formula E team, and then sell sponsorship at a launch event, which includes a potential separate deal with one major corporate client. Nexus' concept revolves around plastic pollution and the oceans; despite poor branding from the sub-team, the concept is well received at their launch event, which leads to some strong deals from sponsors. Supream focuses its concept around clean air, but despite one good deal, it suffers from a relatively poor branding effort, compounded with overall poor sponsorship sales at its launch event due to the concept not being properly communicated during the presentation. In the boardroom, Nexus wins after delivering high sales figures, leaving Supream to face questions about their campaign. Of the final three, Onyeka Nweze is fired for delivering a poor presentation at the launch event.
242	6	"Cereal"	7 March 2024	6.07
Both teams find themselves designing a brand new cereal for six to eight-year-olds, including the product's box, mascot, and a VR feature, before pitching their creation at a launch event to secure orders with retailers. Nexus create a superhero-themed cereal; despite problems with the cereal's flavour and the simplicity of their VR feature, they secure a very large deal at their launch event following positive comments. Supream produces an arctic-themed cereal, but suffer several issues including a bland flavour, a poorly designed box, and a VR game that faces heavy criticism from retailers at the launch event. In the boardroom, Nexus - despite gambling on an exclusive deal - secure the most sales from their cereal, leaving Supream to face the boardroom over their flawed product. Of the final three, Sam Saadet is ejected from the process for her poor leadership and overseeing an overall extremely lacklustre campaign.
243	7	"Budapest Tourism"	14 March 2024	5.45
The teams are sent to Budapest, Hungary, to each host a tour for tourists to enjoy. After a minor switch in the team, Nexus focus on a wine tour, where despite a last minute decision, the team work on a strong sales strategy, and provide a quality tour with added commission from wine sales. Supream produce a boat tour on the Danube including a visit to Margaret Island, but despite delivering quality, the team suffer from a poor ticket sales at lower prices. In the boardroom, Nexus' profits are revealed to have been significantly higher than Supream's, leaving the latter to face scrutiny over their flawed sales strategy. Of the final three, Virdi Singh Mazaria is fired for their poor ticket sales, along with their track record over the last seven tasks.
244	8	"XBUS Advertising"	21 March 2024	5.54
The teams are challenged to promote an XBUS electric van for a particular market with an advertising campaign, pitching their concept to industry experts. Nexus opt to promote the vehicle as a camper van for the leisure market, creating a comedic advert, along with a brand name inspired by the Bed & Breakfast market. Supream choose to promote the vehicle as a mobile shop for business owners, with advertising and branding reflecting this. Neither campaign is without issue, with Lord Sugar determing that Nexus's brand is the best, leaving Supream to face severe questions over their brand and advertising. Amongst the losing team, before being able to select a final three, Noor Bouzaine is dismissed for directing a poor advertising campaign, refusing to accept the flaws of the team's campaign, and for failing to demonstrate any leadership skills to Lord Sugar.
245	9	"TV Selling"	28 March 2024	6.01
The teams are given instructions by Lord Sugar to select and sell products during a primetime Saturday slot on a shopping channel. Supream focus on high-price self-care items; although their performance is decent, the team face issues with their selection and selling in bulk. Nexus focus on unusual mass-market items; the team suffer from a lack of strategy with their products, alongside poor presenting, and mismanaged pricing efforts. In the boardroom, Nexus learns their sale figures are lower than that of Supream's, leaving them to face significant scrutiny over their performance. Of the four candidates brought back to the final boardroom, Raj Chohan is fired, for her poor leadership and presenting skills despite an impressive track record, along with Maura Rath, for delivering a horrible broadcast segment and for being regarded as a weak contributor throughout the tasks.
246	10	"Vegan Alternative to Cheese"	4 April 2024	5.90
The teams find their next task is to produce a vegan cheese product, which they will then pitch to retailers. Nexus creates a high-end truffle-based spread; despite concerns about the branding, the flavour is praised, which leads to orders from both retailers. Supream concocts a curry-flavoured soft cheese, but they suffer from an overall poor branding effort, compounded with the flavour being very poorly received by the public and the retailers. In the boardroom, Nexus win by securing orders, whilst Nexus are scrutinised for their failure upon finding their product received no orders at all. In the end, Lord Sugar fires Foluso Falade almost immediately, for the critical failure in the branding despite her claimed expertise; Steve Darken is later dismissed for his poor decision on the curry flavour and showing no viable qualities as a future business partner.
248	11	"Interviews"	11 April 2024	6.04
After facing ten tasks as teams, the remaining five candidates now compete as individuals in their next task – a series of tough, gruelling interviews with some of Lord Sugar's closest associates: Claudine Collins, Claude Littner, Mike Soutar and Linda Plant. Each member faces scrutiny over their backgrounds, work experience, track record, and business proposals when questioned by interviewers. Feedback to Lord Sugar, alongside observations by his aides, leads him to firing Tre Lowe for lacking the necessary experience for his proposal with an untested and undeveloped product, Flo Edwards for raising concerns over the financial structure of her proposal, and Dr Paul Midha for refusing to give Lord Sugar half of his existing business after his initial business proposal is deemed unworkable. Of the remaining two, Phil Turner is commended for having a business that could compete in the crowded food market despite concerns over his weak track record, while Rachel Woolford earns praise for an established track record in the fitness industry and her ambitious plans to grow her business.
248	12	"The Final"	18 April 2024	6.02
After facing a multitude of business tasks and a tough interview, the two finalists, aided by old colleagues, face the task of launching their respective new businesses, produce advertising campaigns and pitching their businesses to a series of industry experts. Phil works to present his plan for an online pie shop, receiving praise for his recipes, but is faced with questions regarding his online delivery strategy, which experts find to be too confusing. Rachel works to open new locations for her fitness studio, receiving praise her business' ability to compete in a crowded market, yet faces questions on its USP. Based on feedback from these presentations, Lord Sugar decides that Rachel Woolford will be his business partner for 2024 for her strong performance throughout the process and offering a more lucrative proposal, leaving Phil Turner as runner-up due to the complicated aspects of his proposal and having a poor track record.
