= Tolü Makay =

Irish singer-songwriter

- Born: Toluope Makanjuola; 21 August 1996 (age 29); Nigeria
- Origin: Ireland
- Genres: R&B; hip hop
- Years active: 2018–present

Toluope Makanjuola known professionally as Tolü Makay (born 21 August 1996) is a Nigerian-born Irish singer and songwriter.

== Early life ==
Makay was born in Nigeria. At the age of five, Makay moved to Ireland with her father and brother. Her mother and sister had already moved to Ireland before them and were living in direct provision. They first lived in Wexford, then Waterford before settling in Offaly.

Makay sang with a choir in the local Redeem Church in Tullamore every week and was the leader of the youth group in the Church. Makay attended Tullamore College. Prior to embarking on a music career, Makay worked for Google.

== Career ==
Between 2018 and 2019, Makay released music as an independent artist. Her singles 'Ocean' and 'You Are Enough' received critical acclaim. She followed these with her EP, 'Being' released in October 2020.

Makay first found mainstream success when she recorded a version of The Saw Doctors hit single N17 with the RTÉ Concert Orchestra for RTÉ's 2020 New Year's Eve special. The rendition of the song achieved 'viral' status in Ireland with many hailing it as an anthem in reaction to the loneliness and uncertainty brought on by the COVID-19 pandemic. The single reached number 35 in the Official Irish Charts.

In 2021, Makay was awarded the Best Female Artist at the Black and Irish Awards.

Following 'N17' Makay partnered with several fellow Irish female recording artists, including Mary Black, Una Healy and Erica-Cody to form Irish Women in Harmony. A supergroup which released a cover version of the hit The Cranberries song, 'Dreams'. The single raised over €250,000 for Irish charity 'Safe'.

In 2025, Makay released her EP, 'People Still Cry in Summer'.

== Discography ==
=== Extended plays ===
List of EPs, with selected details
Title	Details
Being	Released: October 2020; Label: Welcome To The New World
People Still Cry in Summer	Released: October 2025; Label: Independent
