= Eric Roberts (television presenter) =

Irish broadcaster (born 1990)

- Born: 3 October 1990 (age 35); County Donegal, Ireland
- Occupations: television broadcaster, social media personality

Eric Roberts (born 3 October 1990) is an Irish television broadcaster and social media personality from Donegal.

He is currently one of the hosts of Virgin Media One's flagship breakfast programme Ireland AM.

== Career ==
Roberts shot to Irish public attention during the COVID-19 pandemic with to comedic viral videos on social media platforms, TikTok and Instagram. He has won numerous awards for his social media content including a Goss.ie award for Best Social Media Star in 2025.

Roberts is a self-taught body popper. He and friend Vinny McLaughlin formed a dance duo called, 'Static Movement'. They auditioned for shows including Got to Dance and Ireland's Got Talent.

In 2023, Roberts was one of 456 players from around the world to compete in the first season of the Netflix competition series, Squid Game: The Challenge. He made it to the late stages of the game before being eliminated in the 'Allegiance Test', just missing out on a place in the final twenty players.

In September 2025, having guest presented numerous times, Roberts was named as a permanent host on the weekend editions of the Virgin Media One breakfast show, Ireland AM. In October 2025, Roberts released his first children's book 'Gary the Stinky Goose'. In December 2025, Roberts was announced as one of the celebrities taking part in the ninth season of Dancing with the Stars, getting to the final 4.

== Personal life ==
Roberts married his childhood sweetheart, Niamh, in May 2024. In December 2024, their first child was born.

Prior to his media career, Roberts worked as a special needs assistant. Roberts often shares content with his nephew, Óisín who has cerebral palsy.
