= The Traitors Ireland =

Irish reality TV series

- Genre: Reality; Game show
- Based on: De Verraders by: Marc Pos; Jasper Hoogendoorn
- Presented by: Siobhán McSweeney
- Country of origin: Ireland
- Original language: English
- No. of series: 2
- No. of episodes: 16

Production
- Production locations: Slane Castle, Slane, County Meath, Ireland
- Camera setup: Multi-camera
- Running time: 50–80 minutes
- Production company: Kite Entertainment

Original release
- Network: RTÉ One
- Release: 31 August 2025 – present

The Traitors Ireland is an Irish reality television series broadcast on RTÉ One and streams on RTÉ Player. The first season aired on 31 August 2025, and is based on the Dutch series De Verraders. It is presented by Siobhán McSweeney.

Following the premise of other versions of De Verraders, the show features a group of contestants participating in a social deduction game similar to Mafia or Werewolf, as they stay in a historic castle. During their stay, a small group of contestants become the titular "Traitors", and must work together to eliminate the other contestants to win a grand prize, while the remaining contestants become "Faithful" and are tasked to discover and banish the Traitors by voting them out, to win the grand prize of up to €50,000. The second series premiered on 30 August 2026.

== Format ==
Over twenty contestants arrive at a castle in Meath where they will spend their entire time for the duration of the game (although they sleep off site). On the arrival day, host Siobhán McSweeney picks at least three contestants to be called "Traitors" and the rest are automatically called "Faithful". The television audience can see who have been chosen as Traitors, but the Faithful do not know their identity.

Each night, the Traitors come together and decide upon one Faithful contestant to "murder" – and that person will leave the game immediately. The remaining Faithful contestants will not know who has been eliminated until the following day, when they do not arrive for breakfast.

Each day, the group participates in missions to win money for the prize fund, which can reach up to €50,000 by the end of the game. During the missions, any contestant may separately win a shield that awards that player immunity from being murdered, but not from being banished. In some cases, the contestant has the right or ability not to disclose if they won the shield, or to tell a restricted group.

Usually at the end of each day, the group will participate in the Banishment Ceremony – where the players gather at the Round Table to discuss who they wish to vote out before individually voting for a player to banish. Players cast their votes privately before revealing their vote in turn to everyone. The person obtaining the most votes is banished from the game and must reveal their affiliation. In a tied vote, a run-off vote occurs between those tied with the highest vote tallies. If a second tie occurs, one player is chosen randomly among those not involved in the tie to hold a Dagger - doubling their vote and deciding the outcome of the vote.

If during the game a Traitor is banished, the remaining Traitors may be given the option to "seduce" or recruit a Faithful to join them instead of murdering. Seduced Faithfuls may decline and can decide whether to tell the other Faithfuls of the attempted seduction. If only one Traitor remains, other than on the last episode, the Traitor instead delivers an ultimatum face-to-face with the recruit: if the player declines they are immediately murdered, and if they accept the pair can immediately murder another Faithful.

=== End Game ===
After the final Round Table, the remaining players (typically three or four) gather at a fire and participate in the End Game. The group are given an opportunity to end the game by unanimous vote. Any vote to continue will lead to another immediate banishment vote. When a unanimous decision is reached to end the game — or when there are only two players left — the remaining players reveal whether they are Faithful or Traitors. If they are all Faithful contestants, they will share the prize fund, however, if any of these final players are Traitors then they will share the prize fund amongst themselves. To make their choice they hand Siobhán one of two pouches: one marked "banish again" and another marked "end game". Each of the pouches is then thrown into a fire where "banish again" pouches cause the flames to turn red and "end game" pouches make them green. All active players see how each player voted.

== Production ==
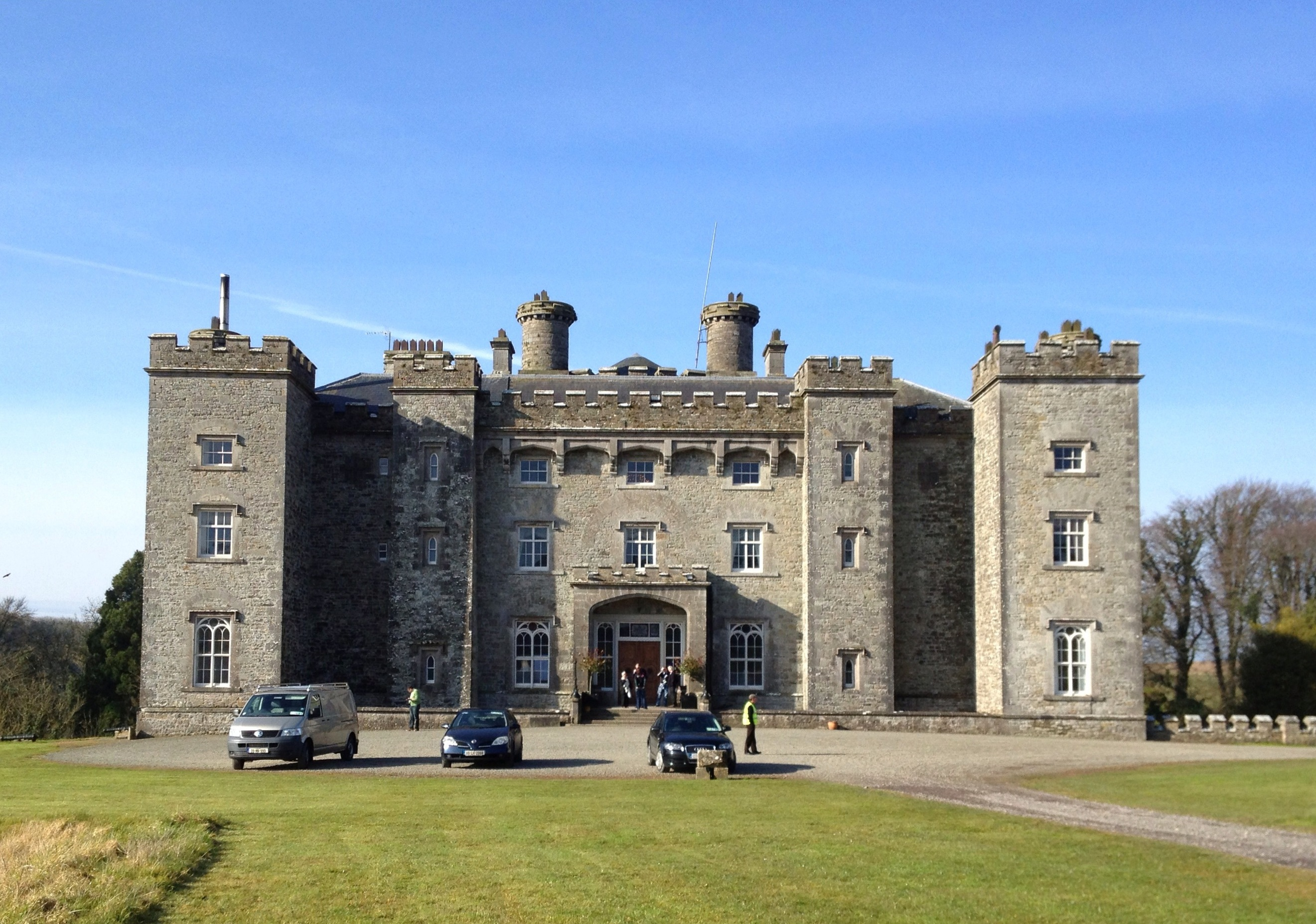
Slane Castle, filming location

In early 2024, RTÉ and Kite Entertainment announced the Irish version of the hit reality TV show, The Traitors. On 18 December 2024, Siobhán McSweeney was announced to be host for the upcoming series. The first series was filmed in mid 2025 and premiered on 31 August 2025.

=== Irish language ===
The show's production deliberately incorporated the Irish language as part of its adaptation strategy. Mairéad Whelan, Director of Content at Kite Entertainment and Series Producer of The Traitors Ireland, stated that the production wanted to emphasise Irish identity in all its forms when adapting the international format, stating that "Part of how we do this is by casting a diverse group of Irish people from all over the country and all walks of life. We also like to have themes that make the most of our history, heritage and humour!"

The show's Irish title is Na Fealltóirí (the Irish word for traitors being fealltóir or tréatúir). Host Siobhán McSweeney, who has strong personal ties to Cúil Aodha in the Múscraí Gaeltacht of County Cork, used Irish phrases throughout the series - including telling contestants to bí curamach ("be careful") in the first episode and urging them to brostaigí ("hurry") in the second.

The second episode featured a mission in which contestants had to locate wooden discs bearing symbols and match them to Ogham script carved into towers in the forest near Slane Castle, with correct answers earning €5,000 for the prize fund. The task required knowledge of Irish, and contestants Niall, a primary school teacher from County Tyrone, and Diane, a radio broadcaster and native of the Aran Islands, took charge, with Niall remarking that he felt "protected from death" because he spoke Irish. Diane, who was banished at the end of the episode despite being a Faithful, told media she was "delighted" that so much Irish had been heard in the show, and that speakers of different dialects had featured, stating "Irish is cool now."

== Episodes ==
=== Series overview ===
Series overview
Series	Contestants	Episodes	Originally released		Winner(s)	Prize	Traitors	Average viewers (millions)
Series	Contestants	Episodes	First released	Last released	Winner(s)	Prize	Traitors	Average viewers (millions)
1	24	12	31 August 2025	23 September 2025	Kelley Higgins; Oyin Adeyemi; Vanessa Ogbonna (Faithfuls)	€42,900 (out of €50,000)	Eamon O'Keeffe; Katelyn Divilly; Paudie Moloney; Andrew Moloney (from ep. 7); Nick O'Loughlin (from ep. 8); Ben Donohue (from ep. 10)	TBA
2	23	12	30 August 2026	22 September 2026	Anna Murphy; Diego Caixeta (Faithfuls)	€45,850 (Note: During the episode 10 mission, Anna won an extra €2,000.) (out of €50,000)	Carla Geary; Fionula Linehan; Páraic Kerrigan; Edelle McDaid (from ep. 2); Aoife Meehan (from ep. 6); Pauric O'Meara (from ep. 7)	TBA

=== Series 1 (2025) ===
No. overall	No. in series	Title	Original release date
1	1	"Episode 1"	31 August 2025
2	2	"Episode 2"	1 September 2025
3	3	"Episode 3"	2 September 2025
4	4	"Episode 4"	7 September 2025
5	5	"Episode 5"	8 September 2025
6	6	"Episode 6"	9 September 2025
7	7	"Episode 7"	14 September 2025
8	8	"Episode 8"	15 September 2025
9	9	"Episode 9"	16 September 2025
10	10	"Episode 10"	21 September 2025
11	11	"Episode 11"	22 September 2025
12	12	"Episode 12"	23 September 2025

=== Series 2 (2026) ===
No. overall	No. in series	Title	Original release date
13	1	"Episode 1"	30 August 2026
14	2	"Episode 2"	31 August 2026
15	3	"Episode 3"	1 September 2026
16	4	"Episode 4"	6 September 2026
17	5	"Episode 5"	7 September 2026
18	6	"Episode 6"	8 September 2026
19	7	"Episode 7"	13 September 2026
20	8	"Episode 8"	14 September 2026
21	9	"Episode 9"	15 September 2026
22	10	"Episode 10"	20 September 2026
23	11	"Episode 11"	21 September 2026
24	12	"Episode 12"	22 September 2026

== The Traitors Ireland: Uncloaked ==
To accompany the series, a follow-up television programme called The Traitors Ireland: Uncloaked aired immediately after each episode. The first episode aired on 31 August 2025. It was hosted by Kevin McGahern and broadcast on RTÉ Two.

The second series moved to RTÉ One airing every Sunday to Tuesday.
