= Paudie Moloney =

Irish television personality

- Born: 17 March 1956 (age 70)
- Occupation: Retired prison officer
- Television: The Traitors Ireland
- Spouse: Bernadette

Paudie Moloney (born 17 March 1956) is an Irish television personality who came to prominence after appearing as a contestant on the first series of The Traitors Ireland in 2025.

== Personal life ==
Moloney is a retired prison officer.

He has ten grandchildren. The eldest of them is Limerick hurler Shane O'Brien.

== Television career ==
Moloney came to national attention for his appearance on the first series of The Traitors Ireland. He was cast as a Traitor, and was banished (eliminated) in the ninth episode of the series. His son Andrew also appeared on the show and was banished in the seventh episode.

Moloney appeared on Gogglebox Ireland as a special guest, alongside his son Andrew and daughter Aoife, in October 2025.

Moloney was cast as the Wizard of Oz in Olly Goes to Oz, the 2025 Christmas panto in the Olympia Theatre.

Moloney appeared on the ninth series of Dancing with the Stars in 2026, being the oldest ever contestant on the show, reaching the final without ending up in the dance-offs. He was partnered with Laura Nolan.
