= Amber Wilson =

Irish podcaster and media personality (born 1983)

- Born: 31 May 1983 (age 42); Dublin, Ireland
- Occupations: Media personality; podcaster
- Relatives: Vogue Williams (sister); Spencer Matthews (brother-in-law)

Amber Wilson (born 31 May 1983) is an Irish media figure, best known as the older sister of Vogue Williams and for co-hosting the podcast Vogue & Amber together with her sister. She stepped into the co-host role after Vogue Williams's husband, Spencer Matthews, exited their previous joint podcast.

== Early life and education ==
Wilson was born on 31 May 1983 in Portmarnock, a suburb of Dublin, before moving to Howth. Her parents, Sandra and former car salesman Freddie, separated when she was nine, and her father died in 2010. She has two siblings, brother Frederick and sister Vogue; she also has two half-siblings.

Wilson graduated from the University of Aberdeen with a BA in the History of Art and a BA in psychology. Later, Wilson graduated from Robert Gordon University attaining an MSc in Corporate Communication and Public Affairs.

== Career ==
Wilson has worked in the PR industry since she graduated. She has worked with firms like Elevate PR and The Wright Bar Group. Since 2015, Wilson has worked as a Client Service Account Director in the PR and marketing agency, Thinkhouse.

On 7 January 2025, it was announced that, following the departure of her brother-in-law Spencer Matthews from his and Wilson's sister's Vogue Williams podcast Vogue & Spencer, Wilson would team-up with Williams to host the rebranded Vogue & Amber podcast.

Wilson competed in Dancing with the Stars, Ireland in 2026. She was paired with Alex Vladimirov in the first all female pairing on the show.

== Personal life ==
Wilson is openly gay. She has discussed having brushes with depression.
