= Siobhán McSweeney =

Irish actress and presenter (born 1977)

- Born: 27 December 1977 (age 48); Aherla, County Cork, Ireland
- Education: École Philippe Gaulier
- Alma mater: Royal Central School of Speech and Drama
- Occupations: Actress and Presenter
- Years active: 2006–present

Siobhán McSweeney (born 27 December 1977) is an Irish actress and presenter. She is best known for her role as Sister Michael in the teen sitcom Derry Girls which earned her a BAFTA Award.

== Early life ==
McSweeney was born and raised in Aherla, County Cork, and attended secondary school at Scoil Mhuire, Cork. Before acting, she earned a science degree at the University College Cork. In 2001, she moved to London when she secured a place at the Central School of Speech and Drama. McSweeney trained under Philippe Gaulier at École Philippe Gaulier in Paris.

== Career ==
McSweeney's first role was in 2006 as Julia in the film The Wind That Shakes the Barley. In 2015, she played Una Gilbert in the film Mr. Holmes. The same year, she played Ruth Cheetham in No Offence. In 2016, she played Audrey in As You Like It at National Theatre Live. Later that year, she played the role of Witzender in the film Alice Through the Looking Glass. In 2017, she played a social worker in the short film Big Dog.

From 2018 to 2022, McSweeney played the role of Sister Michael in the Channel 4 sitcom Derry Girls written by Lisa McGee. McSweeney also played Petra in three episodes of Collateral. In 2019, McSweeney played the role of Boring Noreen in the film Extra Ordinary. She also played Alice in the television series Porters on Dave. In 2020, she appeared in the short films The Widow and Scrubber.

Outside acting, McSweeney has also made guest appearances on television shows including Sunday Brunch and Front Row Late. She also appeared on the Derry Girls edition of The Great British Bake Off which aired on 1 January 2020. Since January 2021, she has been the presenter on The Great Pottery Throw Down on Channel 4. She did not appear in the initial episodes of the 2022 series, after breaking her leg in two places. Ellie Taylor stood in for her. In 2023, she appeared in a celebrity episode of Catchphrase winning almost £30,000 for her charity, The Maya Centre in North London.

On 18 December 2024, McSweeney was announced to be host for the first series of The Traitors Ireland. It was broadcast on RTÉ One from 31 August to 23 September 2025. She reprised this role for the second series in 2026.

== Personal life ==
On 8 November 2019, McSweeney's flat in London caught fire due to a cube double adaptor that had fallen out of the socket. McSweeney was out at the time but revealed she had developed anxiety following the incident.

== Filmography ==
Year	Title	Role	Notes
2006	The Wind That Shakes the Barley	Julia	Credited as Sabrina Barry
2007	Emmerdale	Nurse 2	Episode #1.4703
2011	National Theatre Live: The Kitchen	Anne	
2013	London Irish	Aoife	Episode #1.5
2013–2014	The Fall	Mary McCurdy	7 episodes
2015	Mr. Holmes	Una Gilbert	Uncredited
2015	No Offence	Ruth Cheetham	6 episodes
2016	National Theatre Live: As You Like It	Audrey	
2016	Alice Through the Looking Glass	Witzender	
2017	Big Dog	Social Worker	Short film
2018	Collateral	Petra	3 episodes
2018–2022	Derry Girls	Sister George Michael	Main role; 18 episodes
2019	Extra Ordinary	Boring Noreen	
2019	Porters	Alice	3 episodes
2020	The Widow	Eileen	Short film
2020	Anthony	Luighseach Kelly	TV film
2020	Scrubber	Scrubber	Short film
2020	Nowhere Special	Pam	
2021	The Electrical Life of Louis Wain	Dr Cooke	
2021	Exploring Northern Ireland with Siobhán McSweeney	Herself/host	4 episodes
2021–present	The Great Pottery Throw Down	Herself/host	
2022	Holding	Bríd Riordan	4 episodes
2022	Kepler 62F	Admiral Pix's sidekick	
2022	Redemption	Jane Connolly	6 episodes
2022	Murdoch Mysteries	Aunt Oleander	2 episodes
2022	Death in Paradise	Jennifer Langan	Episode: "Christmas Special 2022"
2023	Finding Brigid	Host	Documentary
2023–2024	Extraordinary	Mary	7 episodes
2025	Amandaland	Della Fry	
2025	Nine Bodies in a Mexican Morgue	Lisa Davies	Main role
2025–present	The Traitors Ireland	Host	
2026	The Dickie Show	Self	Episode 2. Spinoff of Smoggie Queens.

== See also ==
- List of Irish actors
