= Claudine Collins =

English businesswoman (born 1968)

- Born: Claudine Lee; 14 June 1968 (age 58); Watford, London, England
- Occupation: Businesswoman
- Years active: 1995–present
- Known for: The Apprentice
- Spouse: David Zwirn (m. 2017)

Claudine Collins (née Lee; born 14 June 1968) is an English businesswoman. She is known for her work with the media agency Mediacom UK for three decades, during which time she served as chief client officer and managing director. Since 2013, she has appeared as one of the interviewers on the BBC business series The Apprentice.

== Life and career ==
Collins was born Claudine Lee on 14 June 1968 in Watford, London, to Zilda (née Lessman) and David Lee. She has a younger sister, Justine. Their mother later remarried Michael Collins and they adopted his surname. Her first job was working in the shoe department at Bally. She subsequently embarked on an advertising course at Watford College and later began her working at Squires Robertson Gill. In 1995, Collins joined the media agency MediaCom UK as a press buyer, later being promoted to Chief Client Officer and Managing Director. She worked for the company over the next 30 years, before announcing her departure in 2025.

In 2013, Collins became one of the interviewers on the BBC business series The Apprentice. During the eleventh episode of the series, Collins and other interviewers Claude Littner, Mike Soutar and Linda Plant interview the remaining five contestants prior to Lord Sugar's decision on whom to send through to the final, with the exception of the seventeenth series, when Collins did not appear and was replaced by Lord Sugar's aide, Karren Brady. Collins is known for often taking a softer approach than the other interviewers whilst meeting with the candidates. In 2015, Collins was diagnosed with breast cancer, she underwent a lumpectomy followed by radiotherapy. Collins married David Zwirn in December 2017, becoming stepmother to his three children. In 2026, she was appointed chief client officer of Mail Metro Media.

== Filmography ==
As herself
Year	Title	Notes	Ref.
2012–present	The Apprentice	Interviewer	
2011–2025	The Apprentice: You're Fired!	Guest; 7 episodes	
2026	The Apprentice: Unfinished Business	Guest; 1 episode	
