= Linda Plant =

English businesswoman (born 1952)

- Born: Linda Barbara Lawrence; 5 January 1952 (age 74); Leeds, West Yorkshire, England
- Occupations: Businesswoman; entrepreneur
- Known for: The Apprentice
- Spouse(s): David Serr (m. 1970; div. 1990) Stephen Plant (m. 2000)
- Children: 3
- Website: lindaplant.com

Linda Barbara Plant (née Lawrence, previously Serr; born 5 January 1952) is an English businesswoman and entrepreneur. She founded the knitwear brand Honeysuckle, as well as several other businesses and has served as one of the interviewers on the BBC series The Apprentice since 2015.

== Life and career ==
Plant was born Linda Barbara Lawrence on 5 January 1952 in Leeds, West Yorkshire, to Jack Lawrence, a tailor, and Regina Waldman (née Hollander), who worked on a market stall. Plant is Jewish.After leaving school, Plant working full time on her mother's stall, which sold hosiery, handbags and costume jewellery. Plant married David Serr in 1970, and they went on to have three children together. Plant later opened her own retail shops and wholesalers, before founding her knitwear brand Honeysuckle in 1974, which she initially sold in 1981, before buying it back again in 1984. Plant went on to run numerous other businesses, including Homerun and Plant Collections and others specialising in property and interior design.

In 2015, Plant became one of the interviewers on the BBC business series The Apprentice. During the eleventh episode of the series, Plant and other interviewers Claude Littner, Mike Soutar and Claudine Collins interview the remaining five contestants prior to Lord Sugar's decision on whom to send through to the final. Plant is known for her "harsh" and "no-nonsense" interviewing techniques, often leading to clashes with the contestants. Plant's other appearances include the spin-off programmes The Apprentice: You're Fired! and The Apprentice: Unfinished Business, as well as two episodes of The Only Way Is Essex in 2021. In 2023, she appeared on an episode of Abbey Clancy's Celebrity Homes, in which Clancy visited her home.

== Filmography ==
As herself
Year	Title	Role	Ref.
2015–present	The Apprentice	Interviewer	
2015–2025	The Apprentice: You're Fired!	Guest; 9 episodes	
2021	The Only Way Is Essex	Guest; 2 episodes	
2023	Abbey Clancy: Celebrity Homes	Guest; 1 episode	
2025	The Real Housewives of London	Guest; 1 episodes	
2026	The Apprentice: Unfinished Business	Guest; 1 episode	
