= Drama Desk Award for Outstanding Solo Performance =

American theatre award

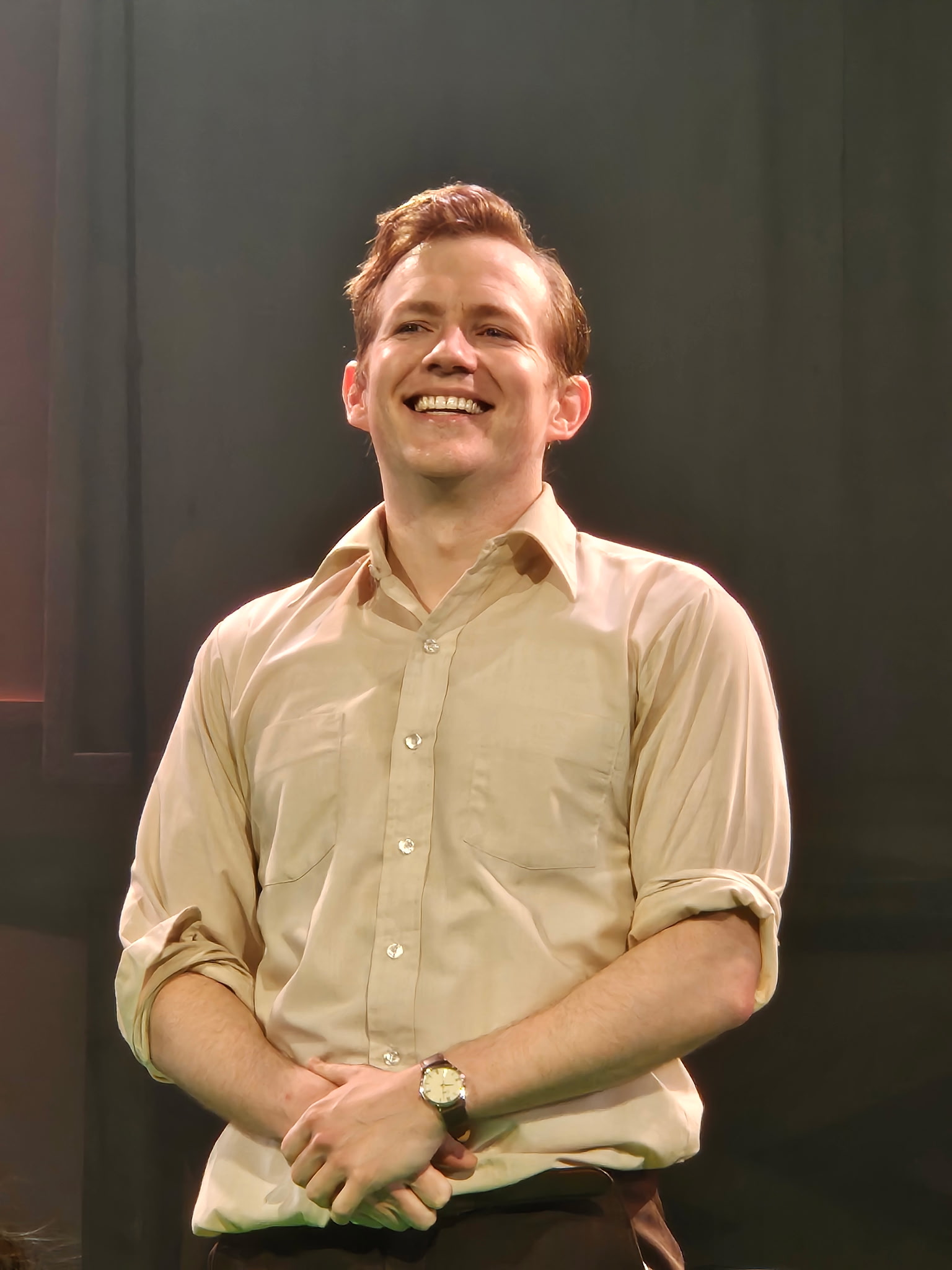
- Jack Holden, 2026 winner
- Awarded for: Outstanding Solo Performance
- Location: New York City
- Country: United States
- Presented by: Drama Desk
- First award: 1984
- Currently held by: Jack Holden for Kenrex (2026)
- Website: dramadesk.org

The Drama Desk Award for Outstanding Solo Performance is an annual award presented by Drama Desk in recognition of achievements in the theatre across collective Broadway, off-Broadway and off-off-Broadway productions in New York City.

The category was first presented at the 1984 ceremony, when it was known as the Drama Desk Award for Outstanding One Person Show, suspended for 1988 and 1989, returning in 1990 as the Drama Desk Award for Outstanding One Person Show/Solo Performance. The current name was first introduced in 1994, but then shifted across the three names until locking on the current name in 1999.

== Winners and nominees ==
Key

and bold indicates the winner.

=== 1980s ===
Year	Performer	Production
1984
1984	**Ian McKellen**	**Acting Shakespeare**
1984	Philip Baker Hall	Secret Honor
1984	Kaye Ballard	Hey, Ma...Kaye Ballard
1984	Edward Duke	Jeeves Takes Charge
1984	Estelle Parsons	Orgasmo Adulto Escapes from the Zoo
1984	Billie Whitelaw	Rockaby
1985
1985	**Whoopi Goldberg**	**Whoopi Goldberg**
1985	Avner Eisenberg	Avner the Eccentric
1985	Spalding Gray	Swimming to Cambodia
1985	Alec McCowen	Kipling
1985	Ekkehard Schall	An Evening with Ekkehard Schall
1985	Lori Wilner	Hannah Senesh
1986
1986	**Eric Bogosian**	**Drinking in America**
1986	Elisabeth Welch	Time to Start Living
1987
1987	**Barbara Cook**	**A Concert for the Theatre**
1988, 1989	—N/a	

=== 1990s ===
Year	Performer	Production
1990
1990	**Robert Morse**	**Tru**
1990	Eric Bogosian	Sex, Drugs, Rock & Roll
1990	Kathryn Grody	A Mom's Life
1990	Mandy Patinkin	Mandy Patinkin in Concert: "Dress Casual"
1991
1991	**Eileen Atkins**	**A Room of One's Own**
1991	Jeffrey Essmann	Artificial Reality
1991	Spalding Gray	Monster in a Box
1991	Tracey Ullman	The Big Love
1992
1992	**Patrick Stewart**	**A Christmas Carol**
1992	Stan Freeman	At Wit's End
1992	Kevin Kling	Home and Away
1992	Josh Kornbluth	Red Diaper Baby
1993
1993	**Anna Deavere Smith**	**Fires in the Mirror**
1993	John Leguizamo	Spic-O-Rama
1993	Lynn Redgrave	Shakespeare for My Father
1993	Ron Vawter	Roy Cohn/Jack Smith
1994
1994	**Anna Deavere Smith**	**Twilight: Los Angeles, 1992**
1994	Eric Bogosian	Pounding Nails in the Floor with my Forehead
1994	Sherry Glaser	Family Secrets
1994	Spalding Gray	Gray's Anatomy
1994	Claudia Shear	Blown Sideways Through Life
1995
1995	**Celeste Lecesne** (Note: Nominated as James Lecesne.)	**Word of Mouth**
1995	Dan Butler	The Only Thing Worse You Could Have Told Me
1995	Danny Hoch	Some People
1995	Avi Hoffman	Too Jewish?
1995	Lisa Kron	101 Humiliating Stories
1996
1996	**Mary Louise Wilson**	**Full Gallop**
1996	Andrea Martin	Nude Nude Totally Nude
1996	Karen Trott	Springhill Singing Disaster
1997
1997	**Fiona Shaw**	**The Waste Land**
1997	Eve Ensler	The Vagina Monologues
1997	Eddie Izzard	Eddie Izzard
1997	Roger Guenveur Smith	A Huey P. Newton Story
1997	Julia Sweeney	Julia Sweeney's God Said "Ha!"
1998
1998	**John Leguizamo**	**Freak**
1998	Lewis Black	Black Humor
1998	Danny Hoch	Jails, Hospitals & Hip-Hop
1999
1999	**David Hare**	**Via Dolorosa**
1999	Will Bond	Bob
1999	Aviva Jane Carlin	Jodie's Body
1999	Alexander H. Cohen	Star Billing
1999	Lisa Kron	2.5 Minute Ride
1999	Laurence Luckinbill	Clarence Darrow Tonight!

=== 2000s ===
Year	Performer	Production
2000
2000	**Dame Edna Everage**	**Dame Edna: The Royal Tour**
2000	Olympia Dukakis	Rose
2000	Spalding Gray	Morning, Noon and Night
2000	Mark Linn-Baker	Chesapeake
2000	Mark Setlock	Fully Committed
2000	Marc Wolf	Another American: Asking and Telling
2001
2001	**Pamela Gien**	**The Syringa Tree**
2001	Eric Bogosian	Wake Up and Smell the Coffee
2001	Bette Bourne	Resident Alien
2001	Brian d'Arcy James	The Good Thief
2001	Sarah Jones	Surface Transit
2001	Ruben Santiago-Hudson	Lackawanna Blues
2002
2002	**Elaine Stritch**	**Elaine Stritch at Liberty**
2002	Dave Gorman	Are You Dave Gorman?
2002	Charles Nelson Reilly	Save It for the Stage: The Life of Reilly
2002	Reno	Rebel Without a Pause
2002	T. Ryder Smith	Underneath the Lintel
2003
2003	**Tovah Feldshuh**	**Golda's Balcony**
2003	Barbara Cook	Mostly Sondheim
2003	Frank Gorshin	Say Goodnight, Gracie
2003	Ricky Jay	Ricky Jay: On the Stem
2003	Priscilla Lopez	Class Mother '68
2003	Charlayne Woodard	In Real Life
2004
2004	**Jefferson Mays**	**I Am My Own Wife**
2004	Barbara Cook	Barbara Cook's Broadway!
2004	Ben Gazzara	Nobody Don't Like Yogi
2004	Sarah Jones	Bridge and Tunnel
2004	Martin Moran	The Tricky Part
2004	Will Power	Flow
2005
2005	**Billy Crystal**	**700 Sundays**
2005	Dame Edna Everage	Dame Edna: Back with a Vengeance
2005	Dave Gorman	Dave Gorman's Googlewhack Adventure
2005	Jackie Mason	Jackie Mason: Freshly Squeezed
2005	Tim Miller	Us
2005	James Urbaniak	Thom Pain (based on nothing)
2006
2006	**Antony Sher**	**Primo**
2006	Judy Gold	25 Questions for a Jewish Mother
2006	Marga Gomez	Los Big Names
2006	Jon Peterson	George M. Cohan Tonight!
2006	Janis Stevens	Vivien
2006	Michael Winther	Songs from an Unmade Bed
2007
2007	**Vanessa Redgrave**	**The Year of Magical Thinking**
2007	Iris Bahr	Dai (enough)
2007	Ed Harris	Wrecks
2007	Capathia Jenkins	(mis)Understanding Mammy: The Hattie McDaniel Story
2007	Anna Manahan	Sisters
2007	Nilaja Sun	No Child...
2008
2008	**Laurence Fishburne**	**Thurgood**
2008	Kris Anderson	Dixie's Tupperware Party
2008	Stephen Lang	Beyond Glory
2008	April Yvette Thompson	Liberty City
2009
2009	**Lorenzo Pisoni**	**Humor Abuse**
2009	Mike Birbiglia	Sleepwalk with Me
2009	Frank Blocker	Southern Gothic Novel
2009	Michael Laurence	Krapp, 39
2009	Matt Sax	Clay
2009	Campbell Scott	The Atheist

=== 2010s ===
Year	Performer	Production
2010
2010	**Jim Brochu**	**Zero Hour**
2010	Theodore Bikel	Sholom Aleichem: Laughter Through Tears
2010	Colman Domingo	A Boy and His Soul
2010	Carrie Fisher	Wishful Drinking
2010	Judith Ivey	The Lady with All the Answers
2010	Anna Deavere Smith	Let Me Down Easy
2011
2011	**John Leguizamo**	**Ghetto Klown**
2011	Daniel Beaty	Through the Night
2011	Mike Birbiglia	Mike Birbiglia's My Girlfriend's Boyfriend
2011	Juliette Jeffers	Batman and Robin in the Boogie Down
2011	Colin Quinn	Colin Quinn: Long Story Short
2011	Joanna Tope	The Promise
2012
2012	**Cillian Murphy**	**Misterman**
2012	Baba Brinkman	The Rap Guide to Evolution
2012	Suli Holum	Chimera
2012	Jeff Key	The Eyes of Babylon
2012	Denis O'Hare	An Iliad
2012	Stephen Spinella	An Iliad
2013
2013	**Michael Urie**	**Buyer & Cellar**
2013	Joel de la Fuente	Hold These Truths
2013	Kathryn Hunter	Kafka's Monkey
2013	Bette Midler	I'll Eat You Last: A Chat with Sue Mengers
2013	Julian Sands	A Celebration of Harold Pinter
2013	Holland Taylor	Ann
2014
2014	**John Douglas Thompson**	**Satchmo at the Waldorf**
2014	David Barlow	This is My Office
2014	Jim Brochu	Character Man
2014	Hannah Cabell	Grounded
2014	Debra Jo Rupp	Becoming Dr. Ruth
2014	Ruben Santiago-Hudson	August Wilson's How I Learned What I Learned
2015
2015	**Benjamin Scheuer**	**The Lion**
2015	Christina Bianco	Application Pending
2015	Jonny Donahoe	Every Brilliant Thing
2015	Tom Dugan	Wiesenthal
2015	Mona Golabek	The Pianist of Willesden Lane
2015	Joely Richardson	The Belle of Amherst
2016
2016	**Jesse Tyler Ferguson**	**Fully Committed**
2016	Simon Callow	Tuesdays at Tesco's
2016	Kathleen Chalfant	Rose
2016	Celeste Lecesne	The Absolute Brightness of Leonard Pelkey
2016	Daphne Rubin-Vega	Empanada Loca
2017
2017	**Ed Dixon**	**Georgie: My Adventures with George Rose**
2017	Nancy Anderson	The Pen (Inner Voices)
2017	Marin Ireland	On the Exhale
2017	Sarah Jones	Sell/Buy/Date
2017	Brian Quijada	Where Did We Sit on the Bus?
2017	Anna Deavere Smith	Notes from the Field
2018
2018	**Billy Crudup**	**Harry Clarke**
2018	David Greenspan	Strange Interlude
2018	Jon Levin	A Hunger Artist
2018	Lesli Margherita	Who's Holiday!
2018	Sophie Melville	Iphigenia in Splott
2019
2019	**Mike Birbiglia**	**The New One**
2019	Carey Mulligan	Girls & Boys
2019	Liza Jessie Peterson	The Peculiar Patriot
2019	Erin Treadway	Spaceman
2019	Phoebe Waller-Bridge	Fleabag

=== 2020s ===
Year	Performer	Production
2020
2020	**Laura Linney**	**My Name Is Lucy Barton**
2020	David Cale	We're Only Alive for a Short Amount of Time
2020	Kate del Castillo	the way she spoke
2020	Jacqueline Novak	Get on Your Knees
2020	Deirdre O'Connell	Dana H.
2021	No awards: New York theatres shuttered, March 2020 to September 2021, due to the COVID-19 pandemic in New York City	
2022
2022	**Kristina Wong**	**Kristina Wong, Sweatshop Overlord**
2022	Alex Edelman	Just for Us
2022	Arturo Luís Soria	Ni Mi Madre
2023
2023	**Jodie Comer**	**Prima Facie**
2023	David Greenspan	Four Saints in Three Acts
2023	Jessica Hendy	Walking With Bubbles
2023	Anthony Rapp	Without You
2023	Tracy Thorne	Jack Was Kind
2024
2024	**Patrick Page**	**All the Devils Are Here: How Shakespeare Invented the Villain**
2024	Michael Cruz Kayne	Sorry for Your Loss
2024	Madeleine MacMahon	Breathless
2024	Wade McCollum	Make Me Gorgeous!
2024	Robert Montano	SMALL
2025
2025	**Andrew Scott**	**Vanya**
2025	David Greenspan	I’m Assuming You Know David Greenspan
2025	Ryan J. Haddad	Hold Me in the Water
2025	Sam Kissajukian	300 Paintings
2025	Mark Povinelli	The Return of Benjamin Lay
2026
2026	**Jack Holden**	**Kenrex**
2026	Savon Bartley	Holes in the Shape of My Father
2026	Hailey McAfee	and her Children
2026	Natalie Palamides	WEER
2026	Julia McDermott	Weather Girl
2026	Josh Sharp	ta-da!

== Statistics ==
=== Multiple Wins ===
2 wins

- Anna Deavere Smith
- John Leguizamo

=== Multiple Nominations ===
4 nominations

- Anna Deavere Smith
- Spalding Gray
- Eric Bogosian
- Barbara Cook

3 nominations

- David Greenspan
- Mike Birbiglia
- John Leguizamo
- Sarah Jones

2 nominations

- Dave Gorman
- Dame Edna Everage
- Ruben Santiago-Hudson
- Celeste Lecesne
- Jim Brochu
- Danny Hoch
