= The Last Session (musical) =

- Music: Steve Schalchlin
- Lyrics: Steve Schalchlin; John Bettis; Marie Cain
- Book: Jim Brochu
- Basis: The life of Steve Schalchlin
- Productions: 1997 Off-Broadway; 1998 Los Angeles; 2012 London

The Last Session is a musical with the book by Jim Brochu and the music and lyrics by Steve Schalchlin, with additional lyrics by John Bettis and Marie Cain. The musical is about a singer/songwriter who has decided to commit suicide to end his battle with AIDS, but only after one last recording session in the studio. The musical was presented Off-Broadway in 1997.

== Background ==
The musical is partially based on Schalchlin's life. CurtainUp notes that the musical is a "fictionalized and more tightly focused version of the autobiographical notes that the composer, Steve Schalchlin, has been keeping about his own life in a diary.

TalkinBroadway explained: "The character of Gideon is clearly based on composer Schalchlin, who has made no secret of the fact that he has escaped HIV-related death at least three times and was convinced by his own companion of fourteen years, Brochu, to write his feelings out as songs."

== Plot ==
Gideon is an ex-gospel singer turned pop star who has scheduled a final recording session. He invites his old band to join him including professional back-up singer Tryshia, failed rock singer turned Mary Kay Cosmetics salesperson, Vicki, and studio engineer Jim. Buddy is a young Texas gospel singer, who has idolized Gideon his entire lifetime. He has come to Los Angeles to meet Gideon and to follow in his footsteps to cross over from gospel to pop. His world is shaken when, during the course of the recording session, he learns that Gideon is gay and has AIDS.

== Productions ==
The Last Session was produced Off-Off-Broadway at the Currican Theater in May 1997, directed by Mike Wills and featuring Bob Stillman as Gideon. The musical next was presented Off-Broadway at the 47th Street Theatre, running from October 17, 1997 to March 1, 1998. Directed by Jim Brochu, the cast featured Bob Stillman as "Gideon," Grace Garland as Trisha, Amy Coleman as Vicki, Dean Bradshaw as Jim and Stephen Bienskie as Buddy.

The musical was nominated for the New York Drama League Award for Distinguished Production of a Musical and the Outstanding Off-Broadway Musical by the New York Outer Critics Circle.

A subsequent production in Los Angeles opened at the Laguna Playhouse and then transferred to the Tiffany Theatre, beginning in December 1998. The production featured two cast members from New York, Bob Stillman and Amy Coleman. New cast members included Michelle Mais (Tryshia), P.M. Howard and Joel Traywick (who went on to be nominated for the Theatre LA Ovation Award for Featured Actor).

The musical was produced at the Tristan Bates Theatre, London, from September 25, 2012 to October 27. Directed by Guy Retallack, Darren Day stars as Gideon. A recording of this production was made by JAY Records.

An original cast album was recorded with elaborate packaging and a vocal selections book was published by Cherry Lane Music.

== Critical response ==
The CurtainUp reviewer of the 1997 Off-Broadway production called the musical "life affirming" and wrote: "'The Last Session' combines an affecting story, songs you'll want to hear again... it's original and funny, enlightening and thoroughly enjoyable. It is not a depressing show about a disturbing subject."

The Variety review of the 1998 Los Angeles production called the musical "cathartic and often hilarious musical".

== Current status ==
The show continues to receive productions including such cities as Baltimore (1999); Rochester NY; Uptown Players at Trinity River Arts Center, Dallas in 2002(which also recorded a cast album); Omaha (1999); Denver, Chicago and Indianapolis (which also recorded their own cast album).

Brochu and Schalchlin have created another musical, which, among other things, traces the history of The Last Session titled The Big Voice: God or Merman?. The musical ran Off-Broadway in 2006.

Composer Steve Schalchlin maintains his online diary called "Living In The Bonus Round".

== Awards ==
- New York Drama League Award - Outstanding Production of a Musical nomination
- New York Outer Critics Circle - Best Off-Broadway Musical nomination
- Los Angeles Stage Alliance Ovation Awards - Nominated for Best Musical, Leading Actor/Musical (Stillman), and Featured Actor/Musical (Joel Traywick)
- GLAAD Media Award - Best L.A. Theatrical Production
- LA Drama Critics Circle - Best Score, Best Book, Musical Direction (Barry Fassman and Bob Stillman), Best Supporting Actress Michelle Mais
