= Ronan Noone =

American dramatist

Ronan Noone is an Irish-American playwright based in Boston, Massachusetts.

== Early life ==
Noone grew up in the town of Clifden in Galway, Ireland. He studied politics and math at Galway University and playwriting at Boston University under the tutelage of Derek Walcott.

== Career ==
Noone moved to Prague when he was 23 and to Martha's Vineyard at age 24, after the St. Vincent de Paul Society sponsored him for a green card. He worked as a bartender and wrote a play about sexual abuse by priests, which later became The Lepers of Baile Baiste. The play was the recipient of the Kennedy Center American College Theatre Festival New Play and the American College Theatre Fund's Student Playwriting Award; it was published by Samuel French. In 2004, the play opened in New York City. Noone followed Lepers with two other plays that completed his Irish Trilogy: The Blowin of Baile Gall and Gigolo Confessions of Baile Breag.

Noone's other works include Brendan, Compass Rose, Scenes from an Adultery and Little Black Dress. Brendan opened at the Huntington Theatre in 2007. The Atheist, his one-person play, was produced at the Huntington Theatre Company and the Williamstown Theatre Festival, with Campbell Scott as its lead. The Atheist made its New York debut at Center Stage in 2006, starring Chris Pine. In 2017, the play was revived at the Boston Playwrights' Theatre with a female lead, Georgia Lyman. Noone directed the production and designed the set.

In 2015, the Huntington Theatre Company produced The Second Girl, Noone's play inspired by Eugene O'Neill's family drama Long Day's Journey Into Night. The production was directed by Campbell Scott. The play was published in 2016 by the Eugene O'Neill Review.

Noone's works were developed at the Sundance Theatre Workshop, New York Stage and Film, The Orchard Project, Lark Theatre and Theresa Rebeck’s Vermont Writer’s Retreat, American Conservatory Theater (ACT) in San Francisco, and the Hermitage Artist Retreat in Florida.

Noone teaches playwriting at Boston University, Lesley University and the Walnut Hill School of the Arts. He was a member of the inaugural class of playwriting fellows at the Huntington Theatre Company, and serves as an artistic associate at the Vineyard Playhouse on Martha’s Vineyard.
