= Atheist (disambiguation) =

An atheist is a person who does not believe in any deities.

Atheist or The Atheist may also refer to:

- Atheis (Atheist in English), a 1949 Indonesian novel by Achdiat Karta Mihardja
- Atheist Rap, a Serbian punk rock band from Novi Sad
- Atheist (band), an American technical death metal band
- The Atheist (comics), a 2005 horror comic book published by Image Comics
- The Atheist (play), a 2005 play by Ronan Noone

== See also ==
- Atheist manifesto (disambiguation)
- Implicit and explicit atheism
- Lists of atheists
- Negative and positive atheism
