= SubUrbia (play) =

1994 play by Eric Bogosian

- Written by: Eric Bogosian

Premiere
- Date: April 27, 1994
- Place: Mitzi E. Newhouse Theater

SubUrbia is a play by Eric Bogosian chronicling the nighttime activities of a group of aimless 20-somethings still living in their suburbian New Jersey hometown and their reunion with a former high school classmate, Pony, who has become a successful musician. Pony's return strips away illusions and excuses to reveal the meaningless dead-end existences of everyone.

== Productions ==
The play was first workshopped at the American Repertory Theatre Institute with Steve Zahn in the role of Buff. It was directed by Eric Bogosian.

The play was originally produced at the Mitzi E. Newhouse Theater of the Lincoln Center Theater from April 27 through August 28, 1994, featuring Martha Plimpton (Sooze), Josh Hamilton (Jeff), Firdous Bamji (Norman), Tim Guinee (Tim), Wendy Hoopes (Bee-Bee), Zak Orth (Pony), Babette Renee Props (Erica), Samia Shoaib (Pakeesa), and Steve Zahn (Buff). Director Robert Falls won a 1994–1995 OBIE Award for the production.

The Boston premiere was held at the Speakeasy Stage Co. in March and April 1997, with DavidLee Wilson (Jeff), Willy O'Donnell (Buff), Valerie Stanford (Sooze), Michael McLaughlin (Tim), Rik Sansone (Pony), Sims McCormick (Erica), Amir Darvish (Norman), Shonali Banerjee (Pakeeza), and Kate Luhr (Bee Bee). Directed by Steven Maler, the production won two Elliot Norton Awards and appeared on the "Best Of 1997" lists in The Boston Globe, Boston Herald, and Phoenix.

The play was presented in 2006 at New York City's Second Stage Theatre with Kieran Culkin (Buff), Gaby Hoffmann (Sooze), Jessica Capshaw (Erica), Daniel Eric Gold (Jeff), Michael Esper (Pony), Halley Feiffer (Bee-Bee), Manu Narayan (Nazeer), and Diksha Basu (Pakeeza), and was directed by Jo Bonney.

Steve Zahn and Samia Shoaib reprised their original roles in the 1996 film version, which also included Parker Posey and Giovanni Ribisi.
