= SubUrbia (film) =

1997 film by Richard Linklater

- Theatrical release poster
- Directed by: Richard Linklater
- Screenplay by: Eric Bogosian
- Based on: SubUrbia a 1994 play by Eric Bogosian
- Produced by: Anne Walker-McBay
- Starring: Jayce Bartok; Amie Carey; Nicky Katt; Ajay Naidu; Parker Posey; Giovanni Ribisi; Samia Shoaib; Dina Spybey; Steve Zahn
- Cinematography: Lee Daniel
- Edited by: Sandra Adair
- Music by: Sonic Youth; Stewart Copeland
- Production company: Castle Rock Entertainment
- Distributed by: Sony Pictures Classics
- Release dates: October 11, 1996 (New York Film Festival); February 7, 1997 (United States)
- Running time: 121 minutes
- Country: United States
- Language: English
- Box office: $656,747

SubUrbia is a 1996 American comedy drama film directed by Richard Linklater from a screenplay by Eric Bogosian, based on his play of the same name. It follows the relationships between a few young adults as they spend their time standing on "the corner" outside a local convenience store. Filmed mainly in Austin, Texas, the film stars Jayce Bartok, Amie Carey, Nicky Katt, Ajay Naidu, Parker Posey, Giovanni Ribisi, Samia Shoaib, Dina Spybey, and Steve Zahn.

== Plot ==
In (fictional) Burnfield, four young adult friends spend their nights hanging out drinking at "the corner" outside a Circle A convenience store and gas station run by Nazeer and Pakessa, a young Pakistani married couple. Jeff is aimless, writing some and dating Sooze, a community college student who wants to study visual arts in New York City. His best friends are dimwitted, libidinous Buff, and Tim, a disaffected heavy drinker recently honorably discharged from the Air Force.

The gang went to high school with Neil "Pony" Moynihan, lead singer of Dreamgirl, an up and coming rock band opening for a major band on a stadium tour. He contacted Sooze about a local performance, and, although Jeff does not want to pay to see "some band that [he] helped start", Pony is supposed to come by the corner afterward. Hearing this, Sooze's shy friend Bee-Bee joins the gang at the corner. As they wait, Nazeer angers Buff and Tim by telling them to leave his property, and Tim shoves Nazeer. Pakeesa brandishes a gun, and the gang disperses. Jeff and Sooze go to a Whataburger and argue about her leaving, while Buff and Tim visit a liquor store. Buff notices Bee-Bee alone and tells her about a cloud he filmed with a stolen video camera, and they have sex in a nearby abandoned van.

Pony arrives in a limousine with Erica, Dreamgirl's publicist. He is excited to be home and see his old friends, and everyone except Tim acts glad to see him, though Jeff seems jealous—feelings that intensify when Pony asks Sooze to design Dreamgirl's next album cover. Buff hits on Erica, and Bee-Bee sidles off while Pony plays a song. Jeff has an outburst, and Pony apologizes for acting like a big shot. He invites everyone out for food, but Tim stays behind, and so does Erica, drawn to Tim's misanthropic attitude. Although Tim reveals his discharge came after he intentionally cut off the tip of his pinky finger, for which he gets a regular disability check, and insists he is not a nice guy, Erica still wants to go to the van, though he cannot perform.

Returning from the restaurant, Jeff asks to stop so he can relieve himself. With Buff passed out drunk, Sooze and Pony bond while they wait. However, Jeff walks back to the Circle A, where he finds Bee-Bee sitting with an unopened bottle of alcohol. She tells Jeff about her struggles with alcoholism and rehab, and he opens the bottle and drinks while listening, before launching into a drunken monologue about overcoming fear—mentioning he has decided to follow Sooze to New York.

The gang reunites, but Tim is evasive about where Erica is, and she is not answering her cellphone. Tim accosts Pony for hitting on Sooze, and Pony announces he is leaving. After a brief argument with Jeff, Sooze goes with him, and Buff joins them to ride in the limo.

Jeff and Tim leave Bee-Bee, and she begins to guzzle her booze. Nazeer sees Tim and calls the police, who arrest Tim. While the officers take Nazeer's statement, Tim tearfully tells Jeff that he punched Erica until she stopped moving and left her in the van. Once alone, Jeff approaches the van, finding Erica's cellphone on the ground outside.

Near sunrise, Buff returns to the Circle A and sees Jeff, who has been agonizing over what to do about Tim's admission. Buff jubilantly says he is going to Los Angeles to shoot Dreamgirl's next music video, and also claims he slept with Erica. Jeff thinks Buff is boasting, until Erica shows up—unharmed.

Fined and released, Tim walks up as Buff and Erica drive away. Jeff confronts him about lying, but Tim just mocks Jeff for believing him and not having the guts to look in the van. Still drunk, Tim threatens Nazeer with a gun, and a standoff ensues when Nazeer pulls his own gun. Tim taunts Nazeer while climbing to the roof, where he sees Bee-Bee, unconscious. He hands her down to Jeff—who thinks she is breathing—and calls an ambulance. Nazeer says Jeff and his friends are stupid for "throw[ing] it all away".

== Cast ==
- Giovanni Ribisi as Jeff
- Steve Zahn as Buff
- Amie Carey as Sooze
- Kitt Brophy as Sooze's Mom
- Jonn Cherico as Shopping Channel Host
- Samia Shoaib as Pakeesa
- Ajay Naidu as Nazeer
- Keith Preusse as Officer Chip
- Eric Park as Officer Gary
- Nicky Katt as Tim
- Dina Spybey as Bee-Bee
- William Martin Hayes as Scuff, the liquor store employee
- Jayce Bartok as Neil "Pony" Moynihan
- Bill Wise as Limo Driver
- Parker Posey as Erica
- M.J. Lin as Restaurant Hostess

Actors Steve Zahn and Samia Shoaib reprise their roles from the original 1994 stage production at the Mitzi E. Newhouse Theater. In the stage play, the character of Nazeer is named Norman.

== Soundtrack ==
SubUrbia: Original Motion Picture Soundtrack

Soundtrack album by various artists
- Released: February 7, 1997
- Label: Geffen Records

In addition to existing songs by various artists heard during the film, Sonic Youth composed and performed new songs for the film.

1. "Unheard Music" – Elastica & Stephen Malkmus
2. "Bee-Bee's Song" – Sonic Youth
3. "Bulletproof Cupid" – Girls Against Boys
4. "Feather in Your Cap" – Beck
5. "Berry Meditation" – U.N.K.L.E.
6. "I'm Not Like Everybody Else" – Boss Hog
7. "Cult" – Skinny Puppy
8. "Does Your Hometown Care?" – Superchunk
9. "Sunday" – Sonic Youth
10. "Human Cannonball" – Butthole Surfers
11. "Tabla in Suburbia" – Sonic Youth
12. "Hot Day" – The Flaming Lips
13. "Psychic Hearts" – Thurston Moore
14. "Town Without Pity" – Gene Pitney

== Reception ==
On the review aggregator website Rotten Tomatoes, 69% of 29 critics' reviews are positive. The website's consensus reads: "SubUrbia succeeds in its blistering, ensemble-driven exploration of middle America, though it never quite reconciles the disparate stylings of director Richard Linklater and writer Eric Bogosian." Metacritic, which uses a weighted average, assigned the film a score of 63 out of 100, based on 20 critics, indicating "generally favorable" reviews. Roger Ebert reviewed the film positively, giving it 3 1/2 stars out of 4, and calling it "dark, intense and disturbing". Time Out noted that it covered much of the same ground as Slacker and Dazed and Confused but said "Linklater keeps matters engrossing, partly through the strong performances he elicits, partly through his firm grasp of the rhythms, colours and moods of suburban existence."

In a 2014 retrospective, Paste said "SubUrbia will likely go down as lesser Linklater’s fare, which is too bad because it’s one of his more accomplished works and certainly better than Tape (Linklater’s other play adaptation), The Newton Boys and the no-reason-to-do Bad News Bears remake."

=== Awards ===
At the 13th Independent Spirit Awards, Ajay Naidu was nominated for Best Supporting Male, but the award went to Jason Lee for his work in Chasing Amy.
