= Janet Zarish =

American actress

- Born: April 21, 1954 (age 72); Chicago, Illinois, U.S.
- Education: Juilliard School (BFA)
- Occupations: Actress, director, teacher
- Spouse: Mark Blum (m. 2005; died 2020)

Janet Zarish (born April 21, 1954) is an American actress known for her work in television, movies and the theatre. She is Associate Arts Professor and Head of Acting of the Graduate Acting Program at NYU's Tisch School of the Arts. She received her B.F.A. at The Juilliard School under John Houseman.

== Career ==
Zarish has appeared on and Off-Broadway, starring in Other People's Money at the Minetta Lane Theater and Miss Julie at the Roundabout Theatre. She appeared in soap operas as Natalie Bannon on As the World Turns in the early 1980s, and as Lee Halpern on One Life to Live from 1986 to 1988, and again from 2008 to 2009. She has also guest starred on Law & Order, Forever, New York Undercover, Seinfeld, Mad About You, and Blue Bloods. Zarish acted in a Seinfeld episode, "The Alternate Side,"; it was selected as one of Seinfeld's top ten episodes by Rolling Stone. In film, she played supporting roles in Mystic Pizza and The Next Big Thing. She directed "Measure For Measure" off-Broadway at The Duke Theater.

== Personal life ==
Zarish was born in Chicago, Illinois on April 21, 1954. She was married to actor Mark Blum until his death on March 25, 2020.
