= Eric Bogosian =

American actor, playwright, and author (born 1953)

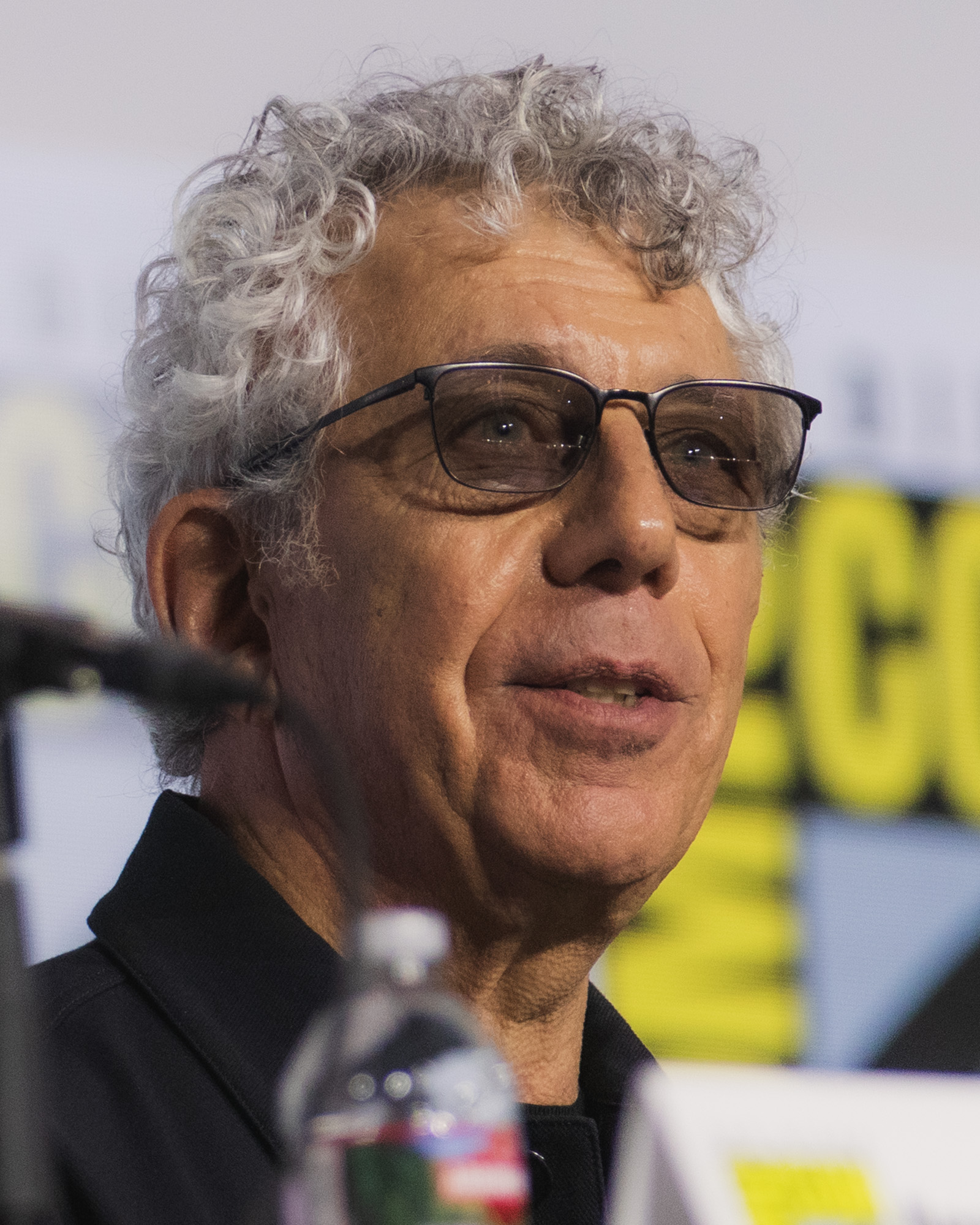
- Bogosian in 2026
- Born: Eric Michael Bogosian; April 24, 1953 (age 73); Boston, Massachusetts, U.S.
- Education: University of Chicago (attended); Oberlin College (BA)
- Years active: 1983–present
- Spouse: Jo Anne Bonney (m. 1980)
- Children: 2

Eric Michael Bogosian (/bəˈɡoʊʒən/; born April 24, 1953) is an American actor, playwright, monologuist, novelist, and historian. Descended from Armenian immigrants, he grew up in Watertown and Woburn, Massachusetts, and attended the University of Chicago and Oberlin College. His play Talk Radio was a finalist for the 1987 Pulitzer Prize for Drama. Bogosian also wrote and starred in the 1988 film adaptation, winning the Silver Bear for Best Actor.

As an actor, he has appeared in plays, films, and television series throughout his career. His television roles include Captain Danny Ross in Law & Order: Criminal Intent (2006–10), Lawrence Boyd on Billions (2017–18), Daniel Molloy on Interview with the Vampire (2022–present), and Gil Eavis on Succession (2018–23). He also starred as Arno in the Safdie brothers' film Uncut Gems (2019).

Bogosian has also been involved in New York City ballet production, and has written several novels as well as the historical nonfiction Operation Nemesis (2015), based on the program to assassinate perpetrators of the Armenian genocide. He has received three Obie Awards and a Drama Desk Award, and is a two-time fellow of the National Endowment for the Arts.

== Early life ==
Eric Bogosian (Armenian: Էրիք Պօղոսեան) was born in Boston, Massachusetts, the son of Edwina (née Jamgochian), a hairdresser and instructor, and Henry Bogosian, an accountant. He spent his early childhood in Watertown, Massachusetts, home to a large Armenian-American community that included his grandparents, survivors of the Armenian genocide. His family moved to nearby Woburn in 1960. He became interested in theater while attending Woburn Memorial High School, and based his play subUrbia on his youth in Woburn's Four Corners neighborhood. He attended the University of Chicago before graduating from Oberlin College.

== Career ==
Bogosian is an author and actor known for his plays Talk Radio and subUrbia, as well as numerous one-man shows. In 1983, Bogosian appeared in the music video for Jim Capaldi's song "That's Love" with his wife, Jo Bonney. In recent years he has starred on Broadway in Donald Margulies' Time Stands Still, published three novels, and was featured on Law & Order: Criminal Intent as Captain Danny Ross.

=== Stage ===
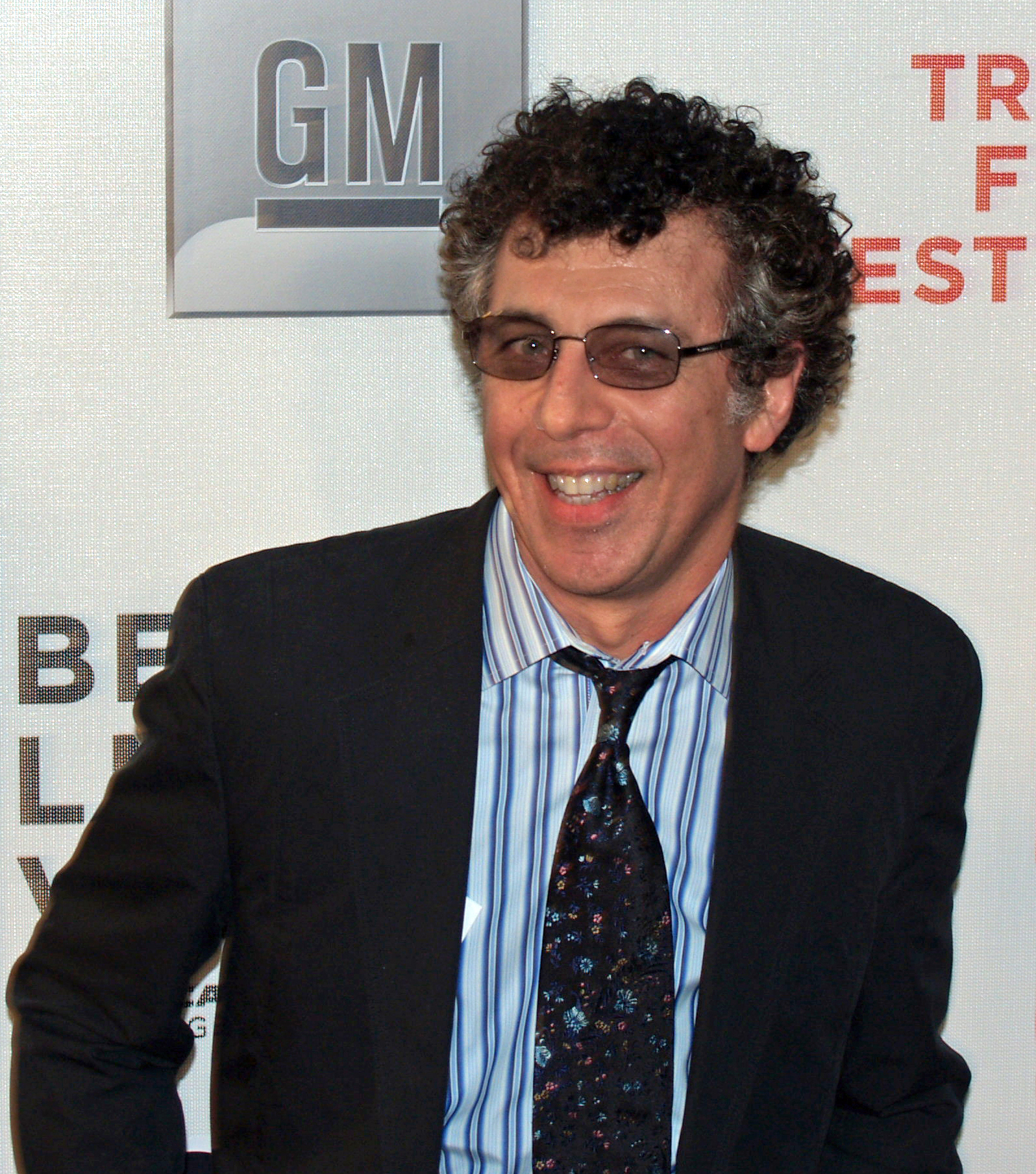
Bogosian in 2007

Between 1980 and 2000, six major solos written and performed by Bogosian were produced Off-Broadway, garnering him three Obie Awards as well as the Drama Desk award. His first two solos, Men Inside and funHouse were presented at the New York Shakespeare Festival. His third, Drinking in America, was produced by American Place Theater. Sex, Drugs, Rock & Roll, Pounding Nails in the Floor with My Forehead, and Wake Up and Smell the Coffee were all produced commercially Off-Broadway by Frederick Zollo.

Bogosian is also the author of six produced plays, including 1987's Talk Radio. Talk Radio was a finalist for Pulitzer Prize for Drama, but lost to Alfred Uhry's Driving Miss Daisy. In 2007, a Broadway revival of Talk Radio directed by Robert Falls starred Liev Schreiber. subUrbia was directed by Robert Falls and produced by Lincoln Center Theater in 1994. Other titles include Griller (Goodman Theater); Humpty Dumpty (The McCarter); Red Angel (Williamstown Theater Festival) and 1+1 (New York Stage and Film). Bogosian's one-man drama Notes from Underground has had several productions, most recently starring Jonathan Ames at Performance Space 122.

In addition to his many appearances in his solo work and starring in his play Talk Radio, Bogosian has also starred in Stephen Adly Guirgis' The Last Days of Judas Iscariot directed by Philip Seymour Hoffman (LAByrinth) and Donald Margulies's Time Stands Still directed by Daniel Sullivan (Manhattan Theater Club/Broadway).

=== Film ===
Bogosian's play Talk Radio was adapted to film in 1988 by Oliver Stone, garnering Bogosian the prestigious Berlin Film Festival Silver Bear. The film version of subUrbia (1996) was directed by Richard Linklater. His play Sex, Drugs, Rock & Roll was adapted to film in 1991. He has appeared in several other films, including Under Siege 2: Dark Territory and Wonderland. In addition, he has been featured in films by such directors as Woody Allen, Robert Altman, Taylor Hackford, Atom Egoyan, and Agnieszka Holland.

=== Television ===
In television, Bogosian is best known for his starring role as Captain Danny Ross in the series Law & Order: Criminal Intent. In addition, he has appeared as a guest star on dramas and in 1994 created with Steven Spielberg the series High Incident for ABC television. He portrayed Barney Greenwald, defense attorney, in the TV film The Caine Mutiny Court Martial. He also appeared in the episode "His Story" on Scrubs as Dr. Cox's therapist and was recurring character Lawrence Boyd in Billions's second season. In 1993, Bogosian played the role of Stan Paxton, Larry's ex-standup partner in the series 'The Larry Sanders Show'. He has also appeared in HBO's show Succession as Senator Gil Eavis, and in the main cast of the AMC show Interview with the Vampire as Daniel Molloy, the reporter who interviews the titular vampire. Bogosian's "incredible performance" during the show's second season was highlighted by Ro Rusak of Nerdist in its Best TV and Film Moments of 2024. That role was particularly important to Bogosian as he was a longtime fan of the vampire genre: "When I first came to New York as a young theatre intern, Frank Langella was doing Dracula on Broadway. I was there with a girlfriend, and we were probably in the last row of the balcony. And I felt like he was breathing down my neck. That power, that energy that he could create, thrilled me." That thrill embedded itself in Bogosian, awakening an inclination toward vampires that has persisted for decades. "I love the eroticism of vampire stuff. I love these movies and plays more than anything. I petitioned Francis Ford Coppola to be in his Dracula, but unfortunately, I wasn't a big enough star," Bogosian shrugs. "But he did invite me to the set, and I got to hang around with him and look at all the storyboards for that movie. That was really exciting." As the years went on, Bogosian's fascination crystallized into a specific desire for his career: One way or another, he was determined to play a vampire. "It's just always on my mind," Bogosian smiles. "I think there's something about the power of a vampire. And hey, the biting the neck stuff is just sexy to me, so that doesn't hurt."

=== Books ===
Bogosian is the author of three novels published by Simon & Schuster: Mall, Wasted Beauty, and Perforated Heart. All of his dramatic work is in print, published by Theatre Communications Group. In 2015, Little, Brown published Operation Nemesis: The Secret Plot that Avenged the Armenian Genocide, a history of Operation Nemesis, which involved a group of Armenian assassins who set out to avenge the deaths of the one and a half million victims of the Armenian genocide.

=== Dance ===
Bogosian founded the dance series at The Kitchen. During his charter tenure there, he produced the first concerts in New York City by Bill T. Jones and Arnie Zane, Karole Armitage, Molissa Fenley, and dozens of other choreographers. In 2006, Bogosian acted as producer on the New York City Ballet's documentary Bringing Back Balanchine.

=== Collaborations ===
In addition to Jo Bonney and Tad Savinar, Bogosian has collaborated with Michael Zwack ("I Saw the Seven Angels"); Joe Hannan ("The Ricky Paul Show"); Glenn Branca ("The New World"); Robert Longo ("American Vanity"); Ann Magnuson (sketches at Folk City) and Elliott Sharp ("This Is Now!"). Since 2016 Bogosian has been filming the 100monologues.com series with Travis Bogosian and Good Baby Films.

=== Awards ===
Bogosian has won the Obie Award three times and the Drama Desk Award. He received the Silver Bear for Best Actor at the 1989 Berlin Film Festival for his work on Talk Radio. He is a 2004 Guggenheim fellow and the recipient of two fellowships from the National Endowment for the Arts.

=== Legacy and influence ===
In April 2025, the one-night monologue performance Wake Up and Smell the C*VID: An Evening Without Eric Bogosian was staged in New York City and online via livestream by the anonymous arts collective HEPA (Holy Erotic Propaganda Arson). While Bogosian was not involved with the play, his legacy and style were invoked in what reviewers described as "a series of monologues about artists and community members whose lives have drastically changed due to COVID-19 and Long COVID." Broadway World reported that the play featured "a fictional septuagenarian playwright who's telling the world it's collapsing while overlooking the collapse of his community—and his own vascular system." According to The Sick Times, the event drew "packed, engaged audiences." Reviewers noted that "even when events like this may be suppressed by social media algorithms… the community who refuses to 'move on' is still hungry for spaces where they can connect."

== Personal life ==
In 1980, he married Jo Anne Bonney, with whom he has two sons, Harry and Travis Bogosian.

In an April 2025 interview with Nerdist, Bogosian reflected on his experiences in the 1970s and his proximity to queer spaces during that period. He stated, "There wasn't a door I didn't walk through. There was nothing that scared me. I was fascinated by whatever was going on. My gay experiences were very limited, but it wasn't like I wouldn't do something."

Bogosian is also the uncle of YouTuber Nisa Thompson, professionally known as Nisipisa.

== Performances and works ==
=== Film ===
Year	Title	Role	Notes
1983	Born in Flames	CBS Technician	
1984	Special Effects	Christopher Neville	
1985	The Stuff	Supermarket Clerk	Uncredited
1988	Talk Radio	Barry Champlain	Also writer
1989	Suffering Bastards	Mr. Leech	
1991	Sex, Drugs, Rock & Roll	Himself	Also writer
1995	Arabian Knight	Phido the Vulture (voice)	
1995	Dolores Claiborne	Peter	
1995	Under Siege 2: Dark Territory	Travis Dane	
1996	The Substance of Fire	Gene Byck	
1996	Beavis and Butt-Head Do America	Ranger at Old Faithful / White House Press Secretary / Lieutenant at Strategic Air Command (voice)	
1996	SubUrbia	—N/a	Writer
1997	Office Killer	Peter Douglas	Uncredited
1997	Deconstructing Harry	Burt	
1997	Anastasia	Lazingo (voice)	deleted scene
1998	Safe Men	Edward Templeton Sr. (voice)	
2000	Gossip	Professor Goodwin	
2000	In the Weeds	Simon	
2001	Wake Up and Smell the Coffee	Himself	Also writer
2002	Igby Goes Down	Mr. Nice Guy	
2002	Ararat	Rouben	
2003	Charlie's Angels: Full Throttle	Alan Caulfield	
2003	Wonderland	Eddie Nash	
2004	King of the Corner	Rabbi Evelyn Fink	
2004	Blade: Trinity	Bentley Tittle	
2005	Heights	Henry	
2008	Cadillac Records	Alan Freed	
2010	Don't Go in the Woods	Producer	
2014	Listen Up Philip	The Narrator (voice)	
2017	Rebel in the Rye	Harold Ross	
2019	Uncut Gems	Arno	
2021	Make Me Famous	Himself	
2023	Reptile	Captain Robert Allan	
2025	On A String	Director	

=== Television ===
Year	Title	Role	Notes
1985	Miami Vice	Zeke	Episode: "Milk Run"
1985	Tales from the Darkside	Junkie	Episode: "The Tear Collector"
1985	The Twilight Zone	Jackie Thompson	Episode: "Healer"
1986	Reading Rainbow	Conan the Librarian (voice)	Episode: "Alistair in Outer Space"
1986	Crime Story	Dee	2 episodes
1987	Alive from Off Center	Various Characters	2 episodes
1988	The Caine Mutiny Court-Martial	Lt. Barney Greenwald	Television film
1990	Last Flight Out	Larry Rose	Television film
1992–1993	Law & Order	Gary Lowenthal	2 episodes
1993	The Larry Sanders Show	Stan Paxton	Episode: "Larry's Partner"
1994	Witch Hunt	Senator Larson Crockett	Television film
1996–1997	High Incident	—N/a	Creator; Executive producer
1998	A Bright Shining Lie	Doug Elders	Television film
1999	Beggars and Choosers	Eric Bogosian	Episode: "Sex, Drugs & Videotape"
2000	Welcome to New York	Robby	Episode: "The Crier"
2001	Third Watch	Lieutenant Lewis	Episode: "The Self-Importance of Being Carlos"
2001	Blonde	Otto Ose	Television miniseries
2001	Shot in the Heart	Larry Schiller	Television film
2003	Scrubs	Dr. Gross	Episode: "His Story"
2006	Love Monkey	Phil Leshing	5 episodes
2006–2010	Law & Order: Criminal Intent	Captain Danny Ross	61 Episodes
2014	The Good Wife	Nelson Dubeck	3 episodes
2015	Elementary	Collin Eisely	Episode: "A Stitch in Time"
2016–2017	The Get Down	Roy Asheton	7 episodes
2017–2021	Billions	Lawrence Boyd	11 episodes
2018–2019	Succession	Gil Eavis	7 episodes
2019	Instinct	Harry Kassabian	Episode: "One-of-a-Kind"
2022–present	Interview with the Vampire	Daniel Molloy	Main role
2025	Talamasca: The Secret Order	Daniel Molloy	Episode: "We Watch and We Are Always There"

=== Writing credits ===
- Men in Dark Times
- Scenes from the New World
- Sheer Heaven (1980)
- Men Inside (1981)
- The New World (1981)
- FunHouse (1983)
- Drinking in America (1986) (Winner of the Drama Desk Award for Outstanding One-Person Show)
- Talk Radio (1987) (also film version 1988)
- Sex, Drugs, Rock & Roll (1990)
- Notes from Underground (1993)
- Pounding Nails in the Floor with My Forehead (1994)
- subUrbia (1994) (also film version 1996)
- Griller (1998)
- Mall (2000)
- Wake Up and Smell the Coffee (2000)
- Humpty Dumpty (2004)
- Non-profit Benefit
- Red Angel
- Wasted Beauty (2005)
- 1+1 (2008)
- Perforated Heart (2009)
- Operation Nemesis (2015)
