= Ben Brown (playwright) =

British playwright

Ben Brown is a British playwright. He was educated at Highgate School. When interviewed about The Promise, his 2010 play about the Balfour Declaration, he said that he had grown up in North London with a non-observant Jewish father.

== Works ==
- Larkin With Women, (2000) a portrait of Philip Larkin and his love-lives which won the TMA Best New Play award that year
- All Things Considered, (1996) a black comedy about philosophy and suicide
- The Promise (2010), about the Balfour Declaration
- Three Days in May, (2011) a drama concentrating on Winston Churchill's darkest hours in the early parts of the Second World War
- A Splinter of Ice, (2020) a drama that reconstructs the meeting between spy Kim Philby and author Graham Greene in Moscow in 1987
- The End of the Night, (2022) a drama about the release of Jews from internment camps at the end of the Second World War
