= The Next Big Thing (film) =

2001 film by P.J. Posner

- The Next Big Thing movie poster
- Directed by: P.J. Posner
- Written by: Joel Posner; P.J. Posner
- Produced by: Amy Hobby; Andrew Fierberg; P. J. Posner; Joel Posner (II)
- Starring: Chris Eigeman; Jamie Harris; Connie Britton; Janet Zarish; Mike Starr; Farley Granger; Marin Hinkle; Peter Giles; Dechen Thurman; John Seitz; Ileen Getz; Edward James Hyland; Gerta Grunen; Samia Shoaib; Doug Stone
- Cinematography: Oliver Bokelberg
- Edited by: David Zieff
- Music by: Casey Filiaci
- Distributed by: Castle Hill Productions
- Release dates: November 8, 2001 (Rehoboth Beach Independent Film Festival); May 29, 2002 (United States)
- Running time: 87 minutes
- Language: English

The Next Big Thing is a 2001 romantic comedy film starring Marin Hinkle, Chris Eigeman, Jamie Harris, Connie Britton and Janet Zarish. It was directed by P.J. Posner.

== Plot ==
Gus Bishop is a talented but failing New York painter who lacks the marketing savvy to make it in today's art world. After getting pick-pocketed in the subway, Gus' destiny is turned over into the hands of Deech—who promptly burglarizes his home and steals his paintings. To capitalize on his stolen goods, Deech generates interest in Gus' work by creating Geoffrey Buonardi, a fictional artist with a fascinating profile. Geoffrey becomes an overnight sensation while Gus is forced into the shadows of the ever-elusive rising star.

== Cast ==
- Chris Eigeman as Gus Bishop
- Jamie Harris as Deech Scumble
- Connie Britton as Kate Crowley
- Janet Zarish as Florence Rubin
- Mike Starr as Walter Sznitken
- Farley Granger as Arthur Pomposello
- Marin Hinkle as Shari Lampkin
- Peter Giles as Roger
- Dechen Thurman as Damian Spire
- John Seitz as Mr. Chesick
- Ileen Getz as Trish Kane
- Edward James Hyland as Museum Director (credited as Ed Hyland)
- Gerta Grunen as Bernice Chesick
- Samia Shoaib as Varda Abromowitz
- Doug Stone as Mr. Willard

== Reception ==
The film received mixed reviews. On Rotten Tomatoes it has an approval rating of 41% based on reviews from 17 critics. Lawrence Van Gelder of The New York Times called it "a deftly satisfying, comically coherent sendup of the world of art". In contrast, Kevin Thomas of the Los Angeles Times thought it was "a feeble and tedious satire". Ed Park of The Village Voice said that "Posner's dishearteningly unsophisticated treatment itself rings false".
