= The Ivy Walls =

American band

- Origin: Los Angeles, CA, United States
- Genres: Alternative rock, Shoegaze
- Years active: 2007-Present
- Labels: Sky Drive Records
- Members: Jeff Yanero; Rodrigo Brea (The Count); Ryan Varon; Adam Waldon
- Website: theivywalls.com

The Ivy Walls are a new wave, shoegaze, post-punk band based out of Los Angeles, CA composed of singer Jeff Yanero, bassist Rodrigo Brea (The Count), keyboardist Ryan Varon and drummer Adam Waldon.

== History ==
The Ivy Walls formed in 2007 and are notable for their music video "All I Want," starring actors, Chris Pine (This Means War, Star Trek, Jack Ryan: Shadow Recruit) and Robert Baker (Grey's Anatomy, G.I. Joe, Indiana Jones and the Kingdom of the Crystal Skull). The video premiered right around the time Pine starred in romantic comedy, This Means War in 2011 alongside Tom Hardy and Reese Witherspoon.

The Ivy Walls have had their music featured in the USA Networks, Royal Pains and feature film, Deadheads. In 2012, they played alongside The Chain Gang of 1974 at Make Music Pasadena, which has also hosted Grouplove, Best Coast, and The Raveonettes. In 2017 they released their fourth album, Pheromones.

== Discography ==
- Lovers in Hotels (2007)
- The Elegant Universe (2009)
- Dirty Passionate Daydreaming (2012)
- Pheromones (2017)

=== Singles ===
- American Velvet: A Tribute To The Velvet Underground (2010)
- Eyes without a Face (2012)
