= Atheist manifesto =

Atheist Manifesto may refer to

- An Atheist Manifesto (1954) by Joseph L. Lewis
- Atheïstisch manifest en De onredelijkheid van religie (1995) (in Dutch, untranslated): Atheist Manifesto and the Unreasonableness of Religion by Herman Philipse
- Atheist Manifesto: The Case Against Christianity, Judaism, and Islam (French: Traité d'athéologie; 2005), a book by Michel Onfray
- "An Atheist Manifesto" (2005), essay by Sam Harris

== See also ==
- Atheism
- Atheist (disambiguation)
