= Stephen Bienskie =

American actor and singer

- Occupations: Actor, singer
- Years active: 1997–present

Stephen Bienskie is an American actor and singer, known for his role on the web series Submissions Only. He has also acted on Broadway and had guest appearances on television.

== Career ==
While trying to find work at the beginning of his acting career, Bienskie worked as a janitor.

His earlier gigs include working at a Renaissance Faire and performing with the CBGB's and The Ramones.

He went on to be the final Rum Tum Tugger in Cats on Broadway and in the ensemble of Chess.

He played Buddy in The Last Session both off-off-Broadway and off-Broadway. He eventually booked the role of Steven Ferrell on the web series Submissions Only, which aired for three seasons between 2010 and 2014. He also played Buffalo Bill in Silence! The Musical and a Greek and a therapist in How to Save the World and Find True Love in 90 Minutes off-Broadway. He has made guest appearances on several shows including Law & Order and Blue Bloods.

== Credits ==
=== Theatre ===
Year	Show	Role	Notes
1997	The Last Session	Buddy	off-off-Broadway, May 1997
1997	The Last Session	Buddy	off-Broadway, October 7, 1997 – March 1, 1998
1998	Just So	Leopard	US premiere
1998	The Fix	Cal Chandler	American premiere
1999	Cats	Rum Tum Tugger	Broadway, closing night cast
2003	Chess	Ensemble	Actors Fund Benefit Concert
2004	tick...tick...BOOM!	Unknown	London Fringe
2005	Tom Jones	Reverend Summer/Captain Blifil/Mr. Fitzpatrick	New York
2006	How to Save the World and Find True Love in 90 Minutes	Greek/Therapist	off-Broadway
2011	Silence! The Musical	Buffalo Bill	off-Broadway
2015	Brigadoon	Unknown	London
2015	In Your Arms	Dancer	Old Globe Theatre

=== Film ===
Year	Title	Role	Notes
2006	Dress Rehearsal	Shawn Penigton	
2008	We Pedal Uphill	Steph	
2016	Breaking Brooklyn	Basil	Filming

=== Television ===
Year	Title	Role	Notes
2000	The Sopranos	Hotel Clerk	1 episode
2001	Law & Order: Special Victims Unit	Ira the Groom	1 episode
2001	Law & Order	Simon	1 episode
2010–2014	Submissions Only	Steven Ferrell	21 episodes
2013	Updates and Behind-the-Scenes at Submissions Only	Self	2 episodes
2011	Blue Bloods	Restaurant Manager	1 episode

=== Video games ===
Year	Title	Role	Notes
2010	Red Dead Redemption	The Local Population	
