= Operation Nemesis (book) =

2015 nonfiction history book by Eric Bogosian

- First edition cover
- Author: Eric Bogosian
- Language: English
- Publisher: Little, Brown
- Publication date: 2015

Operation Nemesis: The Assassination Plot that Avenged the Armenian Genocide is a 2015 book by Eric Bogosian about Operation Nemesis, a plan to kill the perpetrators of the Armenian genocide.

== Background ==
Originally Bogosian aimed to make a film about Soghomon Tehlirian and began writing a screenplay, which evolved into the book. He researched the broader historical events of Operation Nemesis for seven years. Bogosian had initially believed that Tehlirian's killing of Talaat Pasha in 1921 was an urban legend.

The author stated that the book production process had "radicalized" him in favor of ethnic Armenian political positions while previously he held a "pragmatic" point of view.

== Contents ==
The first part discusses the history of Armenia and the Armenian genocide. The second part of the book discusses Operation Nemesis itself, including a biography of the assassin, the death of Talaat, and the aftermath of the assassination. Part three explores the involvement of intelligence agencies in the operation and other Operation Nemesis acts, and what transpired afterwards. The bibliography and endnotes take up about 50 pages.

Aram Kouyoumdjian of Horizon Weekly described the book as a "factually driven… fast-paced, tension-filled, and altogether accessible work", involving "complex geopolitics".

Rupen Janbazian stated in the Armenian Weekly that the book, unlike many other English-language works, discusses the involvement of the Armenian Revolutionary Federation (ARF) and how it purposefully used the shocking public assassination and subsequent trial strategically. The group specifically used the well-publicized trial to raise international awareness of the Armenian genocide and Talaat's role as architect and orchestrator of the mass murders, rapes, deportations, abductions, evictions, thefts, and looting of Turkey's Armenian citizens.

Joseph Kanon of The New York Times stated that because assassinations to right wrongs can turn into terrorist movements, "To his great credit, Bogosian [...] refuses to portray Tehlirian or any of the other members of his group as heroes."

== Reception ==
Kanon praised the book's "gripping action accounts of Nemesis at work, and in the sober assessment of its terrible aftermath." Kanon criticized the "historical narration" as he felt it sometimes goes into tangents and parts feel unnecessary.

Janbazian wrote praise of the book and supported the level of historical detail in the book because "most readers do not have a sufficient understanding of Armenian history."

Kouyoumdjian wrote that the book had "rigorous scholarly research" despite the author not having an academic background.

Kirkus Reviews stated that the book is "Difficult reading, but an extremely well-written political statement about Turkey—not just then, but as it is now."

Publishers Weekly stated that for readers unfamiliar with the subject it "is a highly readable introduction" while for readers who have familiarity "Bogosian has uncovered a little-known aspect of it in fascinating detail."
