= Dina Spybey =

American actress

- Other names: Dina Waters; Dina Spybey-Waters
- Occupation: Actress
- Years active: 1992–present

Dina Spybey, also known as Dina Waters and Dina Spybey-Waters, is an American actress. She has appeared in more than 20 films, including John Q., subUrbia and The Haunted Mansion. She is perhaps best known for her role as Tracy Montrose Blair on the first season of Six Feet Under. She played "young Elise Eliot" in The First Wives Club and a ghost named Emma in Disney's film The Haunted Mansion.

== Career ==
Spybey's early career focused on theater. In 1993, she appeared in the off-Broadway play Five Women Wearing the Same Dress. After three more off-Broadway productions, from 1994 to 1996, she made her Broadway theatre debut in a 1999 production of The Iceman Cometh, at the Brooks Atkinson Theatre.

Her first television role, in a 1992 episode of the after school special series Lifestories: Families in Crisis, predated her first off-Broadway role. This performance, as Becky Bell in "Public Law 106: The Becky Bell Story", earned Spybey the Daytime Emmy Award for Outstanding Performer in a Children's Special.

Her appearances in film and on television escalated from 1996 onward. Spybey was the character Dottie in Greg the Bunny, was in the main cast for the first season of Remember WENN, and also played a stripper colleague of Demi Moore's in Striptease. She played a supporting role in the Mark Waters' film Just Like Heaven (2005). Spybey portrayed a ghost named Emma in the 2003 Disney movie The Haunted Mansion. She had a small role in Waters' Freaky Friday.

She also appeared in the ninth-season premiere of Frasier ("Don Juan in Hell") in 2001 in the role of Nanette Guzman, Frasier Crane's first wife. She was one of three actresses – after Emma Thompson and before Laurie Metcalf – to play a specific point-in-time version of the character over the course of Cheers and Frasier.

== Filmography ==
Note: credited as Dina Spybey through end of 2000, credited as Dina Waters from 2001 onward, except a single 2019 film credit as Dina Spybey-Waters.

=== Film ===
Year	Title	Role	Notes
1996	Big Night	Natalie	
1996	Striptease	Monique, Jr.	
1996	SubUrbia	Bee-Bee	
1997	Julian Po	Dee	
1997	An Alan Smithee Film: Burn Hollywood Burn	Allessandra	
1998	Getting Personal	Liz Carderelli	
1999	Advice from a Caterpillar	Young Woman	
2000	Isn't She Great	Bambi Madison	
2002	John Q.	Debby Utley	starts using Dina Waters credit hereafter
2002	Full Frontal	Third Fired Employee	
2003	Freaky Friday	Dottie Robertson	
2003	The Haunted Mansion	Emma	
2005	Just Like Heaven	Abby	
2008	Yoga Matt	Bonnie Putterman	Short film
2019	Chasing Molly	Janet	credited as Dina Spybey-Waters
2026	Hershey †	Aunt Mattie	Post-production

=== Television ===
Year	Title	Role	Notes
1992	Lifestories: Families in Crisis	Becky Bell	Episode: "Public Law 106: The Becky Bell Story"
1993	CBS Schoolbreak Special	Leanne Strauss	Episode: "If I Die Before I Wake"
1996	The X-Files	FBI Archivist	Episode: "Pusher"
1996	Remember WENN	Celia Mellon	Main role, 14 episodes
1996–1997, 2001	Men Behaving Badly	Brenda Mickowski	Main role, 26 episodes
1997	Gun	Genny	Episode: "All the President's Women"
1998	Conrad Bloom	Nina Bloom #2	Unknown episodes
1998	Suddenly Susan	Gina	Episode: "Don't Tell"
1998	Fantasy Island	Tina	Episode: "Let Go"
1999	Oh Baby	Shelly	Episode: "Lamaze"
1999	Just Shoot Me!	Megan	Episode: "Hostess to Murder"
1999	Cold Feet	Jenny Lombardi	Main role, 8 episodes
2000	Stark Raving Mad	Katherine Yates	Episodes: "The Crush", "The Grade"
2001	Six Feet Under	Tracy Montrose Blair	Recurring role (season 1), 6 episodes; starts using Dina Waters hereafter
2001	Frasier	Nanette	Episode: "Don Juan in Hell: Part 2"
2002	Warning: Parental Advisory	Receptionist	Television film
2002–2004	Greg the Bunny	Dottie Sunshine	Main role, 13 episodes
2005	Joey	Judy	Episode: "Joey and the Valentine's Date"
2007	Family of the Year	Barbara Anderson	Episode: "Pilot"
2010	Neighbors from Hell	Marjoe Saint Sparks	Main voice role, 10 episodes
2011	CPA Holes	Annette Wicks	Television film
2013	Modern Family	Art Teacher	Episode: "Best Men"
2013	Witches of East End	Woman in Hospital	Episode: "Pilot"
2015	Salem Rogers	Karen	Television film
2016	Speechless	Jennifer	Episode: "Pilot"
