= Best Men (Modern Family) =

- Modern Family episode
- Episode no.: Season 4 Episode 17
- Directed by: Steven Levitan
- Story by: Dan O'Shannon; Abraham Higginbotham; Bianca Douglas
- Teleplay by: Dan O'Shannon; Abraham Higginbotham
- Production code: 4ARG15
- Original air date: February 27, 2013

Guest appearances
- Elizabeth Banks as Sal; Nosheen Phoenix as Daliya; Janelle Marra as Valerie; Dina Waters as Art teacher; Michael Masini as Tony; Rachel Marie as Gabby; Finneas as Ronnie Jr.

Episode chronology
| ← Previous "Bad Hair Day" | Next → "The Wow Factor" |
- Modern Family season 4

"Best Men" is the 17th episode of the fourth season of the American sitcom Modern Family, and the series' 89th episode overall. It aired February 27, 2013. The episode was written by Dan O'Shannon and Abraham Higginbotham based on a story by O'Shannon, Higginbotham and Bianca Douglas. It was directed by series co-creator Steven Levitan.

== Plot ==
Sal (Elizabeth Banks), Mitch (Jesse Tyler Ferguson) and Cam's (Eric Stonestreet) best girlfriend back from their party years, unexpectedly comes to their home and announces them that she will marry Anthony (Michael Masini) someone whom she met just three months ago. The wedding is the next day and she asks them to be her best men. Of course they accept but they are not sure if Sal is ready for a wedding since she was always been the party girl. When Sal makes out with the bartender just one hour before the wedding, Cam wants to stop the wedding.

Jay (Ed O'Neill) and Gloria (Sofia Vergara) have hired an English nanny named Daliya (Nosheen Phoenix), but Gloria has some trust issues with her. Meanwhile, they also have to deal with Manny's (Rico Rodriguez) preoccupation with female nudes, which they feel is a result of Gloria's practice of breast-feeding Joe in front of everyone. However, it is then revealed that it is a result of the crush that Manny has developed on Daliya. To arrange some alone time with her, Manny convinces Jay and Gloria to go to the movies, and he prepares a romantic dinner for him and Daliya. While Jay and Gloria are out, they find out about Manny's love for Daliya and they rush back home.

Claire (Julie Bowen) and Haley (Sarah Hyland) have one of their rare bonding moments, and Claire asks Haley to go out for dinner, just the two of them. While dropping off Alex (Ariel Winter) to the bar she is playing with her band, Haley encounters a friend of hers and she leaves with her, ditching her plans for dinner with Claire. Later, she comes back and hangs out with Claire because she feels guilty leaving her while they had plans. A nice surprise awaits both of them when Alex's band starts playing.

Meanwhile, Phil (Ty Burrell) tries to help Luke (Nolan Gould) get a date with Simone (Olivia Rose Keegan) through Facebook. When the date is arranged, Phil goes with Luke at the Dinner and sits at the bar to wait for him. Things get awkward when Simone's divorced mom, Valerie (Janelle Marra), comes to the bar to introduce herself, and it is revealed that she was the one writing the messages on Facebook on behalf of her daughter.

== Reception ==
=== Ratings ===
In its original American broadcast, "Best Men" was watched by 10.53 million; down 0.09 from the previous episode.

=== Critical reception ===
Eric Adams of The A.V. Club gave a B grade to the episode, stating that it was absurdly overstuffed but the show has many potential storylines. "The episode is modern TV comedy presented as a Whitman’s Sampler, multiple variations on the same show housed in one convenient package. And when you can please that many segments of an audience in a single half-hour, longevity and syndication are almost a given."

Dalene Rovenstine from Paste Magazine rated the episode with 8.1/10 saying that the season was a roller coaster and she was not expecting much since the moment Elizabeth Banks appeared.

Michael Adams of 411mania gave the episode 8/10 saying that this episode was an improvement from last week's one. "I thought every storyline was strong, and there were some definite character developments that I assume are going to come into play in later episodes, particularly the ones between the Dunphy girls. The only disappointment in this episode was that they teased us early on this season about the wedding. I really thought it was going to be Mitchell and Cam's wedding, but obviously, it wasn't. I'm ok with how it turned out..."

Victoria Leigh Miller from Yahoo! TV said that Mitch and Cam are the best best men in TV history.

Leigh Raines from TV Fanatic rated the episode with 4.5/5 while Zach Dionne of Vulture rated it with 3/5.
