= Kristina Wong, Sweatshop Overlord =

2021 play by Kristina Wong

- 2021 Off-Broadway production poster
- Written by: Kristina Wong
- Subject: Xenophobia and racism related to the COVID-19 pandemic

Premiere
- Date premiered: November 4, 2021
- Place premiered: New York Theatre Workshop

Kristina Wong, Sweatshop Overlord is a 2021 American play by Kristina Wong. Its premise is based on Wong's experience organizing hundreds of volunteers to sew masks amid the COVID-19 pandemic, calling themselves the "Auntie Sewing Squad". Over the course of the play, Wong uses comedy to address themes such as the often unattainable nature of the American Dream, anti-Asian racism in the U.S. caused by the pandemic, and the invisible labor of women and people and color. The play was a finalist for the 2022 Pulitzer Prize for Drama, and won the Lucille Lortel Award, Drama Desk Award, and Outer Critics Circle Award for Outstanding Solo Show.

== Synopsis ==
During the early days of the COVID-19 pandemic, Kristina Wong begins sewing masks from old bedsheets and bra straps on her Hello Kitty sewing machine. She quickly organizes the Auntie Sewing Squad, a network of hundreds of volunteers—including children and her mother—working from home to produce masks and address gaps in the U.S. public health system. As the project grows, Wong reflects on the blurred line between mutual aid and cult-like dedication.

As demand for masks declines and pandemic restrictions ease, Wong navigates life after leading the group, exploring the challenges of rebuilding personal and communal connections. The performance combines humor and generosity, inviting the audience to witness Wong’s efforts to foster community during isolation while reflecting on the pandemic’s broader social impact.

== Production history ==
The play was developed through live Zoom performances during the pandemic.

=== New York Theatre Workshop, NYC (2021) ===
Kristina Wong, Sweatshop Overlord premiered off-Broadway at the New York Theatre Workshop on November 4, 2021. The production was directed by Chay Yew, and was streamed virtually for purchase.

=== West Coast Productions (2022–2023) ===
The show made its West Coast premiere at La Jolla Playhouse's Potiker Theatre on September 20, 2022. Wong later brought the play to Portland Center Stage beginning in November 2022 and performed at Center Theatre Group's Kirk Douglas Theatre beginning in February 2023.

== Reception ==
The show has received positive reviews. Laura Collins-Hughes of The New York Times declared it a Critics Pick, describing the show as a "spiky comic tonic". In a review of Center Theatre Group's production of the show in Los Angeles, critic Charles McNulty of the Los Angeles Times praised Wong's performance as being full of "vibrant, wacky, lovably chaotic immediacy".

== Awards and nominations ==
Year	Award	Category	Nominee	Result	Ref.
2022	Pulitzer Prize for Drama		Kristina Wong	Nominated	
2022	Drama Desk Award	Outstanding Solo Performance		Won	
2022	Drama Desk Award	Scenic Design of a Play	Junghyun Georgia Lee	Nominated	
2022	Outer Critics Circle Award	Outstanding Solo Performance		Won	
2022	Lucille Lortel Award	Outstanding Solo Show		Won	
