= Steve Schalchlin =

American songwriter, actor and musician (born 1953)

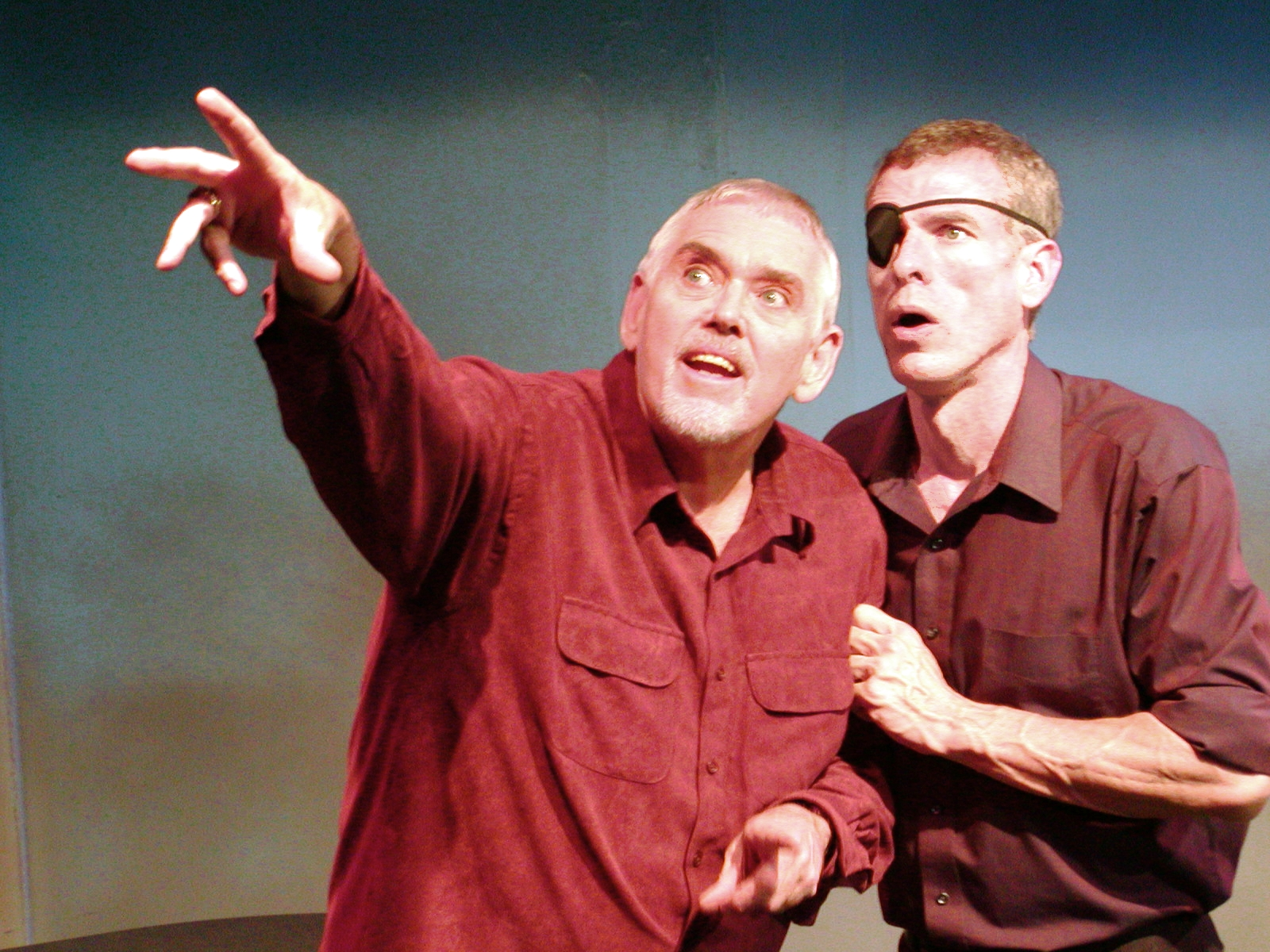
- Jim Brochu (L) and Steve Schalchlin in The Big Voice
- Born: October 4, 1953 (age 73); Little Rock, Arkansas, United States
- Occupations: Songwriter, actor, musician
- Years active: 1971-present

Steve Schalchlin (born October 4, 1953) is an American songwriter, actor and musician. He is widely regarded as one of the first HIV/AIDS bloggers, beginning his in 1996 to keep family and friends updated on his failing health. When he responded well to a last-ditch effort in treatment by his doctor, he found out that his little "AIDS blog" had garnered a net following. A respected songwriter, Steve put his rebound into music that his partner, playwright Jim Brochu, turned into the critically acclaimed The Last Session.

In 2001, the New York Times profiled Schalchlin's groundbreaking diary. The Times has also raved about Schalchlin and Brochu's musicals, The Last Session and The Big Voice: God or Merman?

Schalchlin is cited in Shawn Decker's 2006 Book My Pet Virus as an important historical AIDS blogger and an inspiration for Decker's own AIDS blogging efforts.

Schalchlin volunteers time as a board member of LGBT support organizations, Families United Against Hate and Youth Guardian Services. He marched with Soulforce on the historic first march to Jerry Falwell's church. He was a featured performer at the PFLAG national conference and speaker at the March on Washington.

George Michael allowed Schalchlin to play John Lennon's IMAGINE piano in the front yard of Gabi and Alec Clayton in memory of their son, Bill, who committed suicide after a gay bashing. Steve's personal video blogs of the event:

- Part 1 on YouTube;
- Part 2 on YouTube;

Steve's song "My Thanksgiving Prayer" was selected to honor the 30th Anniversary of the Beirut barracks bombing, honoring the 241 Marines, Sailors, and Soldiers who served as Peacekeepers in Beirut, Lebanon 1982–1984, killed on October 23, 1983.

== Awards ==
Among his awards and nominations:

- Best Musical Score, L.A. Drama Critics Circle, 1997 & 2003
- Best L.A. Theatre Production, GLAAD Media Awards, 1997
- Best Musical L.A. Ovation Awards (LA's equivalent of the Tony), 2005
- Best Musical Nomination NY Drama League, 1997
- Best Musical Nomination NY Outer Critics Circle, 1997
- Best Theatrical Production nomination, Off-Broadway GLAAD Media Awards 2004
- Best Theatrical Production nomination L.A. GLAAD Media Awards, 2004
- Best Musical, ADA Awards, 2005
- Best Musical Director, ADA Awards, 2005
- Best Lead Actor in a Musical nomination, L.A. Ovation Awards, 2005
- PFLAG-LA Oscar Wilde Award, 1997 & 2003
- Best Concert of a Musical Desert Theatre League Awards 2005
- Best Original Writing, Desert Theatre League Awards 2005
