= Zero Hour (play) =

- Written by: Jim Brochu
- Characters: Jim Brochu as "The Artist" (Zero Mostel)
- Subject: The life and career of Zero Mostel
- Setting: Mostel's art studio on West 28th Street, New York, NY, circa 1977

Premiere
- Date: July 7, 2006
- Place: Egyptian Arena Theatre, Hollywood, California

Zero Hour is a 2006 one-person play written and performed by playwright and actor Jim Brochu and directed by actress Piper Laurie. In a biographical reflection on Zero Mostel, Brochu portrays the Jewish actor and comedian giving a fictional interview with an unseen New York Times reporter shortly before Mostel's death in 1977. Brochu's Mostel recounts his life and career; he describes the impact of the Hollywood blacklist on himself and his friends, including his testimony before the House Un-American Activities Committee, as well as his success with A Funny Thing Happened on the Way to the Forum, Fiddler on the Roof and the original movie version of The Producers.

A lifelong admirer of Mostel, Brochu found inspiration during his research into the adversity Mostel faced, including his parents' rejection of his marriage to a Catholic woman and a bus accident that resulted in a severe leg injury, and how his "sense of humor saved him". Writing the play during intermissions of another show he was working on, Brochu also drew upon his own recollections of Mostel, including seeing the actor in Forum and visiting him backstage:

I went down and Zero was outside of his dressing room reading the Riot Act to one of the other actors. The actor had upstaged him or done something. He was screaming at this actor and finished with, Now never do it again! The actor walked away and he looked at me and said, Well, hello!. How are you? Come visit me.

After seeing the play, Mostel contemporary Theodore Bikel wrote to Brochu, "Thank you for bringing back a volcano that we thought was long extinct."

The play premiered at the Egyptian Arena Theatre in Hollywood, California, presented by the West Coast Jewish Theatre and directed by Paul Kreppel. It won the 2006 Ovation Award for "World Premiere Play." It began a limited Off Broadway run at St. Clement's Theatre beginning November 14, 2009, officially December 22, and running through January 31, 2010. Brochu won the 2010 Drama Desk Award for Outstanding Solo Performance.
