= The Promise (2010 play) =

Play by Ben Brown

The Promise is a 2010 play written by Ben Brown. It premiered on 17 February at the Orange Tree Theater in Richmond-upon-Thames and production wrapped up on 20 March 2010. It is set in early World War I and deals with the lead-up to the Balfour Declaration, via the relationship between Herbert Samuel, Edwin Samuel Montagu, and H. H. Asquith's confidante Venetia Stanley.
