= Kristina Wong =

American performance artist, comedian and actor

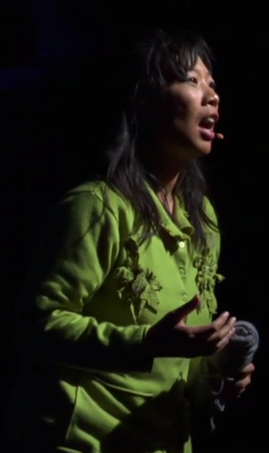
- Wong performing Wong Flew over the Cuckoo's Nest
- Born: San Francisco, California, U.S.
- Education: University of California, Los Angeles (BA)

Comedy career
- Years active: 2000–present
- Medium: D.I.Y., Internet art, monologue, performance art, stand-up comedy, street theatre, television, film
- Genres: Asian American humor Liberal/political humor LGBT humor
- Subjects: Environmental movement, feminism, mental health, race, liberal issues
- Website: Official website

Kristina Wong (Chinese: 黄君儀; pinyin: Huáng Jūnyí) is an American comedian known primarily for her work as a solo theater performer, performance artist, and actor. She identifies as a feminist and her work often tackles themes regarding race, sex, and privilege, often in conjunction with the Asian-American experience, through a satirical lens.

As of 2019, she serves as an elected representative of the Wilshire Center Sub-district 5 Koreatown Neighborhood Council in Los Angeles.

== Early life and education ==
Wong was born in San Francisco to an accountant mother and insurance salesman father. She is a third-generation Chinese American. Her grandmother immigrated to the United States from Guang Mei Cun, a village near Kaiping county, in the 1930s. Wong attended an all-girls Catholic high school, where she took speech class.

Wong attended the University of California, Los Angeles (UCLA). For her senior project, she created “Big Bad Chinese Mama”, a fake mail-order bride website to tackle fetishization of Asian women by white males. The site was advertised in fetish chat rooms, next to masseuse ads in the local newspaper, and optimized in search engines to return alongside searches for Asian porn. It featured biographies of real Asian women accompanied by photographs of them in fighting poses and abrasive language critiquing the viewer's potential search for mail order brides.

She graduated in 2000 with double degrees in English and World Arts and Cultures and a minor in Asian American Studies. She later returned as a commencement speaker for the UCLA English Department in 2008 and UCLA's student-initiated Asian Pacific Islander graduation (APIG) in 2014, the latter included a bit about re-defining sex appeal of Asian American men.

Prior to finding success as an artist, she worked as an eBay vendor, a restaurant hostess, and earned $10/hour at an art non-profit.

== Performance art ==
=== Fannie Wong ===
In 2017, Wong exhibited her "Fannie Wong" persona, a crass "former Miss Chinatown 2nd-Runner-Up", at "In Search of Miss Ruthless", an experimental, multi-media exhibition revolving around the cultural impact of the Miss Chinatown USA pageant within the Chinese American diaspora, at the Para Site gallery in Hong Kong. The installation included Wong interacting with exhibit-goers next to a display case full of memorabilia from "Fannie Wong's" previous performances, including the time she crashed the 2003 Miss LA Chinatown pageant. Themes include questioning the traditional beauty standards for Chinese-American women and the cultural expectation of them to be obedient and overachievers.

=== Kristina Wong for Public Office ===
As part of the City of Los Angeles Individual Artists 2018 Fellowship, Wong intends to run for public office before 2030. While doing so, she intends on performing various exaggerated campaign events, such as a debate match with a dog and public stoning by audience members during a stump speech. Wong comments on the reality of the Donald Trump presidency and the dualistic nature of being a politician and a performance artist, whether that be the trained, such as the trained, codified body language. “We used to listen to politicians and laugh at comedians, now we laugh at politicians and listen to comedians.” The piece premiered as an interactive exhibit in LA Chinatown in November 2018.

She lost the election for Democratic delegate of Assembly District 53 in Jan 2019, a volunteer position to represent the district at the Democratic State Convention.

Wong has subsequently been elected to the Wilshire Center Koreatown Neighborhood Council in April 2019, a largely volunteer position that meets once a month at the local library.

She launched her next campaign event alongside the presidential election in February 2020.

== Theatre ==
=== Wong Flew Over the Cuckoo's Nest ===
In 2006, Wong received support from the Creative Capital and the National Performance Network to create "Wong Flew Over the Cuckoo's Nest." The show explores mental health concerns among Asian American women. It ran for eight years, and it has toured nationally. It was directed by Katie Pearl.

=== Wong Street Journal ===
The show premiered in 2015 in San Francisco and is directed by Emily Mendelsohn. The show was developed in residency at York University in Toronto, initially focusing on "economics, the stock market, and theory." Her previous works touched upon stereotypes of Asian American women by Western society, i.e. fetishism and the model minority myth, in a satirical manner. Wong Street, in that vein, challenges the West's patronizing perception of Africa, including her own, such as the need to donate clothes.

Birthed out of the mental burnout from her previous two shows, Wong Flew Over the Cuckoo's Nest and Cat Lady, regarding depression and loneliness respectively, and the Sisyphean task of combating online trolls, Wong decided to take a break by volunteering with a microloan organization in Northern Uganda for three weeks in Sept 2013. She draws upon that experience to present a contemporary, ethnographic perspective that contrasts previous colonial "ethnological expositions" at previous World's fairs.

Throughout the show, Wong discusses her trip and criticizes white privilege in America while struggling to come to terms with the adjacent privilege of being a Westerner in a developing country. Despite the racial differences back home, once in Uganda, she was often called “mzungu,” a Bantu term for “white.” “Suddenly, I was the face of oppression...it was really weird to go from constantly calling out white people to people having to literally walk around the power I bring to the room.” Wong accepts the privilege of being able to live out an "Eat, Pray, Love" moment of self discovery in a foreign country and ponders how to "leave a legacy, and not be a colonial asshole?”. Additionally, Wong discusses the pervasive nature of social media and contrasts it to the lack of personal understanding between people of different cultures, admitting to the urges of documenting everything online. Wong posits that this practice is no different than American's perception of Africa coming from different forms of white media. Wong concludes that "the best way to help [marginalized people] is to find ways to support their self-determination...the ability of people who want to speak for themselves?”

While in Gulu, Uganda, Wong ended up collaborating on a rap album with Nerio, a local Ugandan producer. The album, Mzungu Price, dropped in November 2013. Written and performed by Wong, it features Festo Wine, MC Kash, LMG Silver, Sarah Sullivan, and Nerio himself. The song "Boss Lady" is featured in Wong Street Journal.

In 2018, Wong brought the show to Africa and appeared as a guest in The Other News (Nigeria's Daily show), My Africa Podcast and also as Guest on Nigerian comedian Ali Baba's Seriously Speaking

=== Kristina Wong, Sweatshop Overlord ===
Kristina Wong, Sweatshop Overlord is a 2021 American play by Wong, centered on her experience organizing hundreds of volunteers to sew masks amid the COVID-19 pandemic, calling themselves the "Auntie Sewing Squad". Over the course of the play, Wong uses comedy to address themes such as the often unattainable nature of the American Dream, anti-Asian racism in the U.S. caused by the pandemic, and the invisible labor of women and people and color. The play was a finalist for the 2022 Pulitzer Prize for Drama, and won the Lucille Lortel Award, Drama Desk Award, and Outer Critics Circle Award for Outstanding Solo Show.

== Other work ==
=== Video ===
In 2017, Wong launched “How (Not) to Pick Up Asian Chicks”, a web series where she and a panel of Asian women review self-published books by white men about picking up Asian women.

In 2018, Wong launched "RADICAL CRAM SCHOOL", a web series children's show where she leads discussions with kids of lower elementary school age around various social justice topics. The project subsequently received criticism from the far right conspiracy website, InfoWars. Season 2 was crowdfunded in 2019 for about $19k and will premiere January 2020.

=== Opinion ===
Wong often writes about the perception of Asians in popular culture. For that, she has appeared on Totally Biased with W. Kamau Bell on FX to discuss an article she wrote for XoJane entitled "9 Wack Things White Guys Say to Deny Their Asian Fetish" and her obsession with professional NBA player Jeremy Lin. Her other articles include "10 More Wack Things People Say After You Write an Essay About Wack Things White Guys Say to Deny Their Asian Fetish," and "8 Reasons People of Color Must Rally for 'White History Month'".

In June 2015, Wong was a panelist on The Nightly Show with Larry Wilmore, discussing Emma Stone's casting as a half Asian-Pacific woman in Aloha (2015 film). She appeared alongside comedians Jo Koy and Dan St. Germain, who debated with her and Wilmore the legitimacy of a white woman being cast as a woman of color. Wong condemned the casting choice, declaring that legitimately Asian actors "would've been happy to take a shit part, that's all we get anyway." When Wilmore asked about colorblind casting, she took the stance that all colorblindness means is that "everyone gets to be white. Everyone gets a shot at having a narrative...which is usually just depicted by white people." She wrote a self-assessment editorial for Scenario USA later that month recollecting the experience.

=== Food Bank Influencer ===
After going on a video binge and watching people living on a limit of $10 a week for food, Wong was motivated to spend only $50 for a whole month of grocery expenses. She documented this challenge and gave her the new hat of Food Bank Influencer.

== Selected awards and recognition ==
Wong appeared in the premiere episode of Asian American cable network Myx TV's first original reality series I'm Asian American and....

In October 2014, Wong was featured in the New York Times' "Off Color Comedy" series. The video focused on the ways in which her comedy, speeches, one-woman shows, and poetry take on racist stereotypes, the fetishization of Asian women, and the perception of women in media. She asserts that her attempt to change the way that people like her are viewed "is a long fight. And if I fight it constantly with anger, that's the man getting me twice, right, once when they've made fun of me and the second time by getting me to be angry."

- 2019 Center Theatre Group's Dorothy and Richard E. Sherwood Award
- 2006 Creative Capital Award

In recognition of Kristina Wong, Sweatshop Overlord, Wong was recognized as a Pulitzer Prize finalist in the Drama category. Wong was also awarded the 2022 Lucille Lortel award for Outstanding Solo Show and the Outer Critics Circle award for Outstanding Solo Show. Wong was additionally nominated for the Drama Desk Award for Outstanding Solo Show and the Off-Broadway Alliance Award for Outstanding Solo Show.
