= Samia Shoaib =

American actress

- Born: June 25, 1970 (age 55); Pakistan
- Occupation: Actress
- Years active: 1994–2001, 2012

Samia Shoaib is a Pakistani-born American writer and former actress.

== Biography ==
She moved to the United States where she studied English and Theater at the University of California, Berkeley and George Washington University. She studied acting at the Royal Academy of Dramatic Arts in London. She completed a Masters of Fine Arts at Columbia University.

== Filmography ==
Film
| Year | Title | Role | Notes |
|---|---|---|---|
| 1996 | Love Lust and Marriage | | |
| 1996 | SubUrbia | Pakeesa Choudhury | |
| 1996 | Joseph Potts | Bar Patron #4 | |
| 1998 | Pi | Devi | |
| 1998 | The Object of My Affection | Suni | |
| 1998 | Side Streets | Dancing Party Guest | |
| 1999 | Jump | Julie | |
| 1999 | The Sixth Sense | Young Woman Buying Ring | |
| 2000 | The Intern | Betsy | |
| 2000 | Requiem for a Dream | Nurse Mall | |
| 2001 | The Next Big Thing | Varda Abromowitz | |
Television
| Year | Title | Role | Notes |
| 1997 | Law & Order | Donna Khobar | 1 episode |
| 1999-2000 | La Femme Nikita | Elena Samuelle | 4 episodes |
| 2000 | Sex and the City | Animal Nurse | 1 episode |
