= Sex, Drugs, Rock & Roll (film) =

- Directed by: John McNaughton
- Written by: Eric Bogosian
- Produced by: Frederick Zollo
- Starring: Eric Bogosian
- Cinematography: Ernest Dickerson
- Edited by: Eleana Maganini
- Distributed by: Avenue Pictures
- Release date: 1991
- Running time: 99 minutes
- Country: United States
- Language: English

Sex, Drugs, Rock & Roll is a 1991 American film directed by John McNaughton of Eric Bogosian's one-man stage show of the same name.
