= Campbell Scott =

American actor (born 1961)

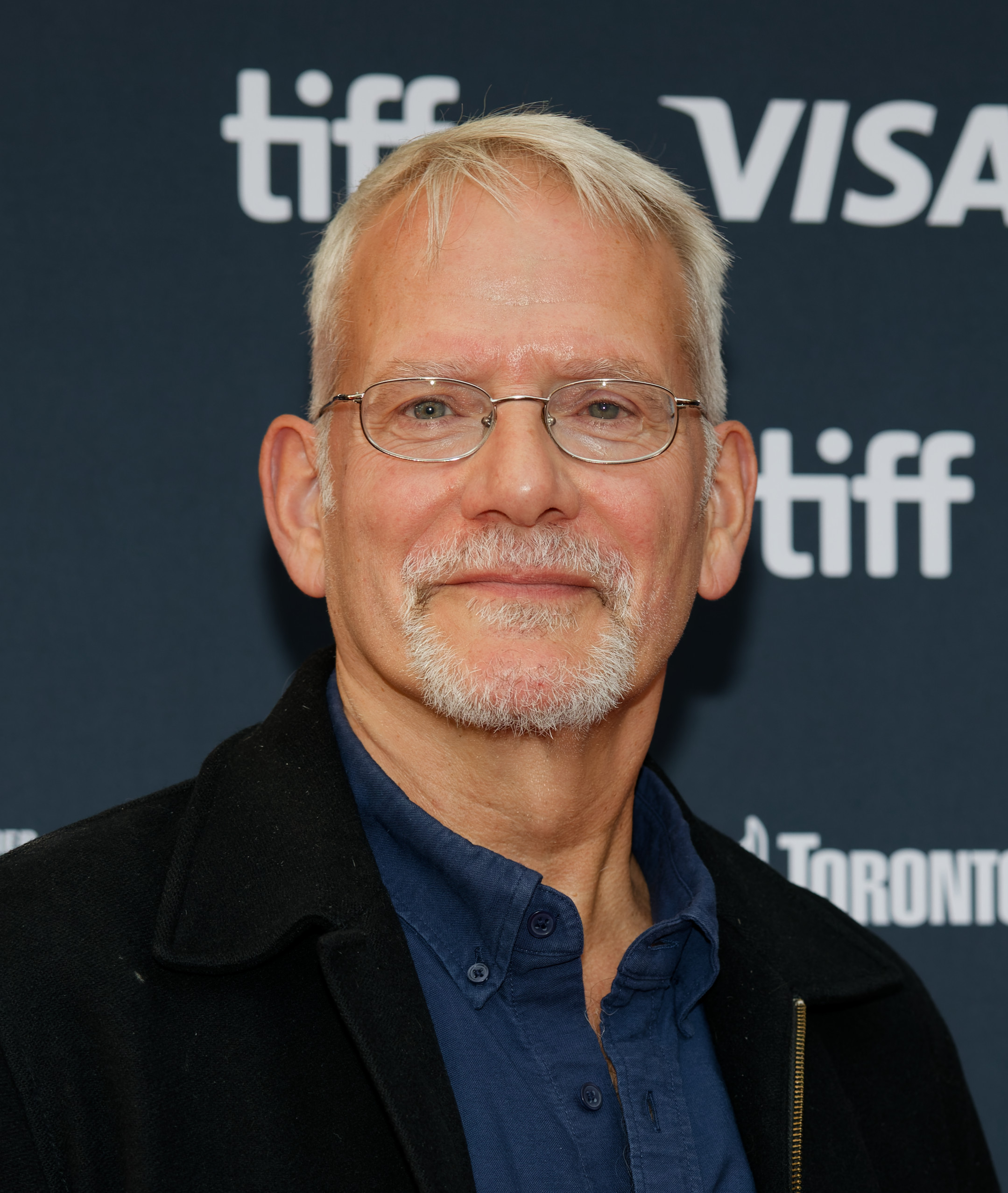
- Scott at the 2024 Toronto International Film Festival
- Born: July 19, 1961 (age 65); New York City, U.S.
- Education: Lawrence University
- Occupation: Actor
- Years active: 1986–present
- Spouses: Anne Scott (m. 1991; div. 2002) Kathleen McElfresh (m. 2009)
- Children: 3
- Parent(s): George C. Scott; Colleen Dewhurst
- Relatives: Alexander Scott (brother); Devon Scott (paternal half-sister)

Campbell Scott (born July 19, 1961) is an American actor. The son of actors George C. Scott and Colleen Dewhurst, he had his film breakthrough in Longtime Companion (1989), followed by starring roles in The Sheltering Sky (1990), Dying Young (1991), and Singles (1992). He has been twice nominated for the Independent Spirit Award for Best Male Lead, for his performances in Mrs. Parker and the Vicious Circle (1994) and Roger Dodger (2002). He was nominated Best First Feature for his directorial debut Big Night (1996), which he co-directed with Stanley Tucci.

He is also known for to television audiences for his roles as Boris Kuester von Jurgens-Ratenicz on Royal Pains, Joe Tobin on Damages, and Mark Usher on House of Cards. His other film work includes roles in The Daytrippers (1996), The Spanish Prisoner (1997), The Exorcism of Emily Rose (2005), and Jurassic World Dominion (2022), and playing Richard Parker, the father of Peter Parker / Spider-Man, in The Amazing Spider-Man (2012) and its sequel The Amazing Spider-Man 2 (2014). His stage work includes roles in Broadway productions like The Real Thing, Hay Fever, Long Day's Journey into Night, The Atheist and Noises Off.

== Early life ==
Scott was born on July 19, 1961, in New York City, the son of actor George C. Scott and actress Colleen Dewhurst. He graduated from John Jay High School with friend Stanley Tucci before graduating from Lawrence University in 1983. His brother is Alexander Scott. One of his paternal half-sisters is actress Devon Scott.

== Career ==
Scott's first film appearance was in the 1987 movie Five Corners, as a policeman. In 1990, Scott played a lead role in the ground-breaking film Longtime Companion, which chronicles the early years of the AIDS/HIV epidemic and its impact upon a group of American friends. In the following year he appeared briefly in the Kenneth Branagh-directed Dead Again and co-starred in the movie Dying Young (in which his mother also appeared) alongside Julia Roberts. He also appeared in the 1992 Cameron Crowe movie Singles with Bridget Fonda and Kyra Sedgwick, and in 1996, he teamed up with Stanley Tucci to direct the film Big Night. The film met with critical acclaim and was nominated for the Grand Jury Prize at the Sundance Film Festival. For their work, Scott and Tucci won both the New York Film Critics Circle Award and the Boston Society of Film Critics Award for Best New Director.

In 2002, he was awarded the Best Actor prize from the National Board of Review for his performance in Roger Dodger. Scott starred in Six Degrees on ABC in 2006.

In 2004, he starred alongside Adam Butcher in Saint Ralph.

In 2005–2006, Scott served as the reader for the audiobook versions of Stephen King's bestsellers The Shining and Cell, and for Ernest Hemingway's For Whom the Bell Tolls.

In 2007, Scott lent his voice for the narration of a Chevron Corporation television ad, as well as the Iraq War documentary film No End in Sight. He also appeared in the romantic comedy Music and Lyrics, starring Hugh Grant and Drew Barrymore. Next up for Scott was the 2009 drama Handsome Harry. Scott also had a recurring role on the USA drama Royal Pains as Boris Kuester von Jurgens-Ratenicz.

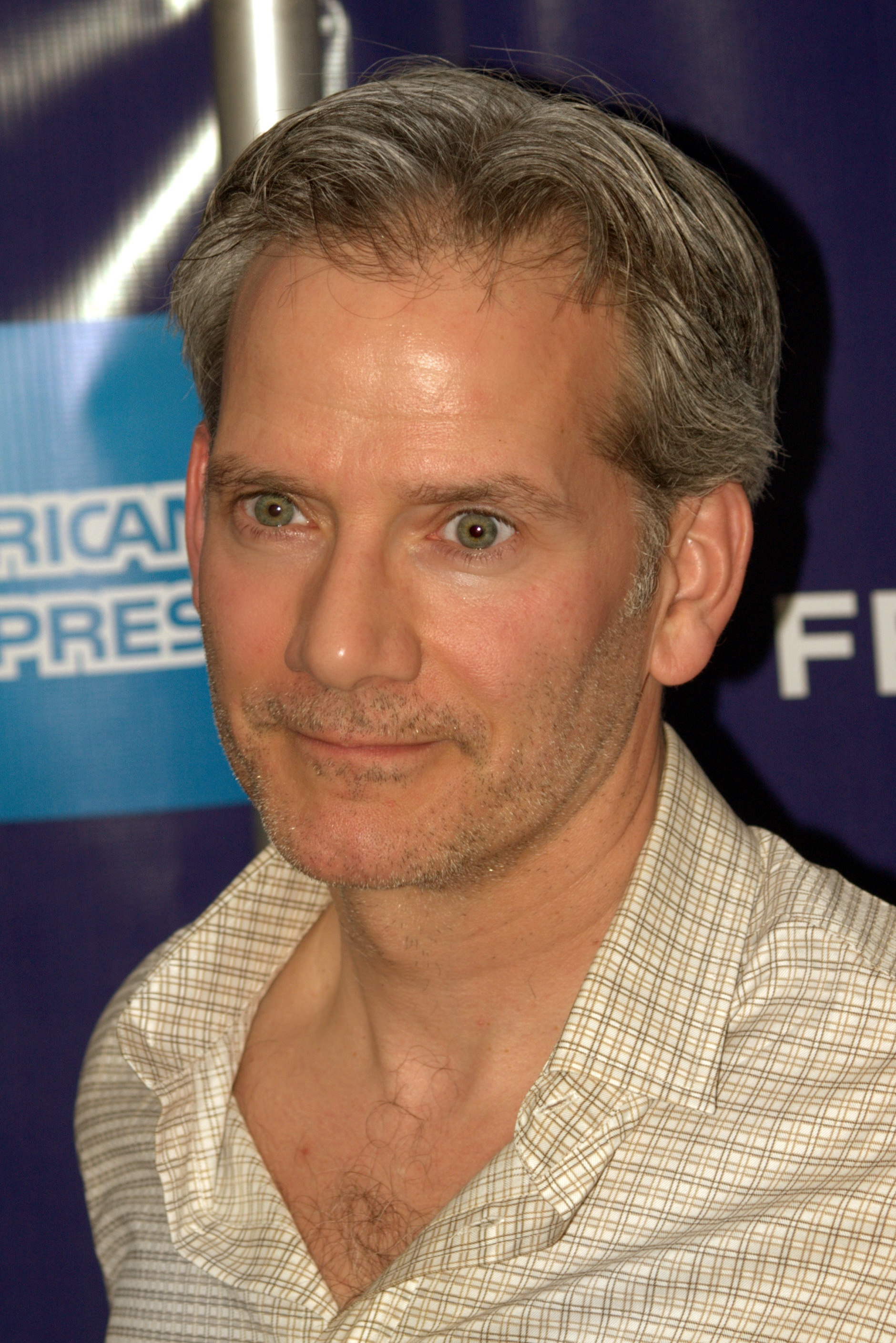
Scott at the 2009 Tribeca Film Festival

From 2009 to 2010, Scott had a recurring role in the third season of Damages, playing Joe Tobin, the son of indicted Bernie Madoff-like Louis Tobin (Len Cariou).

In 2010, Scott provided the voice-over for a new Häagen-Dazs TV commercial called "Ode to Flavor". The ad was created by Goodby, Silverstein & Partners and directed by Noah Marshall, with art direction by Croix Gagnon. He played the role of Richard Parker, the father of Peter Parker, in the 2012 film The Amazing Spider-Man. Scott reprised his role in the 2014 film The Amazing Spider-Man 2. From 2015 to 2016, Scott appeared as Lloyd Dallas in the Broadway revival of Noises Off. In 2017, he collaborated with Dutch DJ and producer Ferry Corsten on Blueprint, an album combining Trance music and science fiction, in which he can be heard as the story's narrator. In 2019 Scott portrayed the lead role of Ebenezer Scrooge in a Broadway adaptation of Charles Dickens's A Christmas Carol written by Jack Thorne and directed by Matthew Warchus.

Scott portrayed Dr. Lewis Dodgson (replacing Cameron Thor) in Jurassic World Dominion (2022), the sixth film in the Jurassic Park franchise.

In 2026, he portrayed Franklin D. Roosevelt in the French film De Gaulle.

== Personal life ==
Scott has been married twice.

Scott met his current wife Kathleen McElfresh, in 2007 when the two were working on separate plays at the Huntington Theater in Boston. Scott was working on The Atheist, while McElfresh was working on Brenden.

Scott has three sons. He lives with his family in northwest Connecticut.

He is an Episcopalian and is apart of the Advisory Board for the Episcopal Actors Guild.

== Filmography ==
=== Film ===
Year	Title	Role	Notes
1987	Five Corners	Policeman	
1988	From Hollywood to Deadwood	Bobby	
1989	Longtime Companion	Willy	
1990	Ain't No Way Back	Fletcher Kane	
1990	The Sheltering Sky	George Tunner	
1991	Dead Again	Doug	
1991	Dying Young	Victor Geddes	Nominated—MTV Movie Award for Best Breakthrough Performance
1992	Singles	Steve Dunne	
1993	The Innocent	Leonard	
1994	Mrs. Parker and the Vicious Circle	Robert Benchley	Nominated—Independent Spirit Award for Best Actor
1995	Let It Be Me	Dr. Gabriel Rodman	
1996	The Daytrippers	Eddie Masler	Also executive producer
1996	Big Night	Bob	Also co-producer and co-director with Stanley Tucci; Boston Society of Film Critics Award for Best New Director; New York Film Critics Circle Awards for Best New Director; Nominated—Deauville Film Festival Grand Special Prize Award; Nominated—Independent Spirit Award for Best First Film; Nominated—Sundance Film Festival Grand Jury Prize for Dramatic Feature
1997	The Spanish Prisoner	Joseph A. "Joe" Ross	
1998	Hi-Life	Ray	
1998	The Impostors	Meistrich	
1999	Top of the Food Chain	Dr. Karel Lamonte	
1999	Spring Forward	Fredrickson	
1999	Lush	Lionel 'Ex' Exley	
2000	Other Voices	John	
2001	Delivering Milo	Kevin	
2001	Final	—N/a	Director and producer
2002	Roger Dodger	Roger Swanson	National Board of Review Award for Best Actor; Nominated—Independent Spirit Award for Best Actor
2003	The Secret Lives of Dentists	David Hurst	Also producer
2003	Off the Map	—N/a	Director and producer
2004	Saint Ralph	Father George Hibbert	Nominated—Genie Award for Best Performance by an Actor in a Supporting Role
2004	Marie and Bruce	Tommy	
2005	Loverboy	Paul	
2005	The Exorcism of Emily Rose	Ethan Thomas	
2005	Duma	Peter	
2005	The Dying Gaul	Jeffery Tishop	Also producer
2007	Music and Lyrics	Sloan Cates	
2007	Crashing	Richard McMurray	
2007	No End in Sight	Narrator	
2008	Phoebe in Wonderland	Principal Davis	
2008	One Week	Narrator	Voice
2009	Handsome Harry	David Kagan	
2009	The National Parks: America's Best Idea	Various Historical Figures	Voice
2009	Company Retreat	—N/a	Director
2010	Beware the Gonzo	Arthur Gilman	
2010	God in America	Narrator	Voice
2010	Eye of the Hurricane	Bill Folsom	
2011	Love, Lots of It	The Man	
2012	The Amazing Spider-Man	Richard Parker	
2012	Still Mine	Gary	
2012	Clinton	Narrator	Voice
2013	Before I Sleep	Young Eugene	
2014	The Amazing Spider-Man 2	Richard Parker	
2016	Manhattan Night	Simon Crowley	
2017	A Lotus 'Til Reckoning	Pete	
2017	A Long Time for Lovers	News Reporter	
2018	The Chaperone	Alan Carlisle	
2020	The 11th Green	Jeremy Rudd	
2022	Jurassic World Dominion	Dr. Lewis Dodgson	
2024	Millers in Marriage	Nick	
2025	Nonnas	Edward Durant	
2026	De Gaulle	Franklin D. Roosevelt	

=== Television ===
Year	Title	Role	Notes
1986	L.A. Law	Officer Clayton	Episode: "Sidney, the Dead-Nosed Reindeer"
1987	Family Ties	Eric Matthews	Episode: "Invasion of the Psychologist Snatchers"
1990	The Kennedys of Massachusetts	Joseph P. Kennedy Jr.	TV miniseries
1991	The Perfect Tribute	Carter Blair	TV film
1997	Liberty!	Thomas Jefferson	Documentary miniseries
1998	The Love Letter	Scott Corrigan	TV film
1998	The Tale of Sweeney Todd	Ben Carlyle	TV film
2000	Hamlet	Hamlet	TV film; also director and producer
2001	Follow the Stars Home	David McCune	TV film
2002	The Pilot's Wife	Roger Hart	TV film
2006	Six Degrees	Steven Caseman	13 episodes
2006	Final Days of Planet Earth	William Phillips	TV film
2009–2016	Royal Pains	Boris Kuester von Jurgens-Ratenicz	TV series
2010	Damages	Joe Tobin	13 episodes
2012	The Men Who Built America	Narrator	Four part miniseries docudrama
2014	The Blacklist	Owen Mallory / Michael Shaw	Episode: "The Cyprus Agency"
2015	Allegiance	Mysterious Date	Episode: "Pilot" (uncredited)
2016	Sex & Drugs & Rock & Roll	Himself (Campbell Scott)	Recurring
2017	Last Week Tonight with John Oliver	Election Party Guest	Segment: "Harding"
2017	Lore	George Brown	Episode: "They Made a Tonic"
2017–2018	House of Cards	Mark Usher	Main role; 19 episodes
2018	Dietland	Stanley Austen	Recurring role; 3 episodes
2018	The Men Who Built America: Frontiersmen	Narrator	Four part miniseries docudrama
2019	At Home with Amy Sedaris	Yves St Au Jus	Episode: "Creativity"
2019	Instinct	Pasternack	Episode: "Grey Matter"
2019	Soundtrack	Frank	Main cast
2019–present	The Food That Built America	Narrator	TV series
2021	Prodigal Son	Professor Delaney	Episode: "Alma Mater"
2022	Billions	Colin Drache	Recurring
2022	WeCrashed	Jamie Dimon	Miniseries; 4 episodes
2025–2026	Elsbeth	Captain Cyrus Tully	2 episodes
2026	Furious	Hal Hartford	2 episodes

2026 Line of Fire Senator Terry Cross

=== Video games ===
Year	Title	Role	Notes
2022	Jurassic World Evolution 2	Lewis Dodgson	Biosyn Dominion expansion

=== Music albums ===
Year	Title	Artist	Role	Notes
2017	Blueprint	Ferry Corsten	Narrator	
