= Chris Pine =

American actor (born 1980)

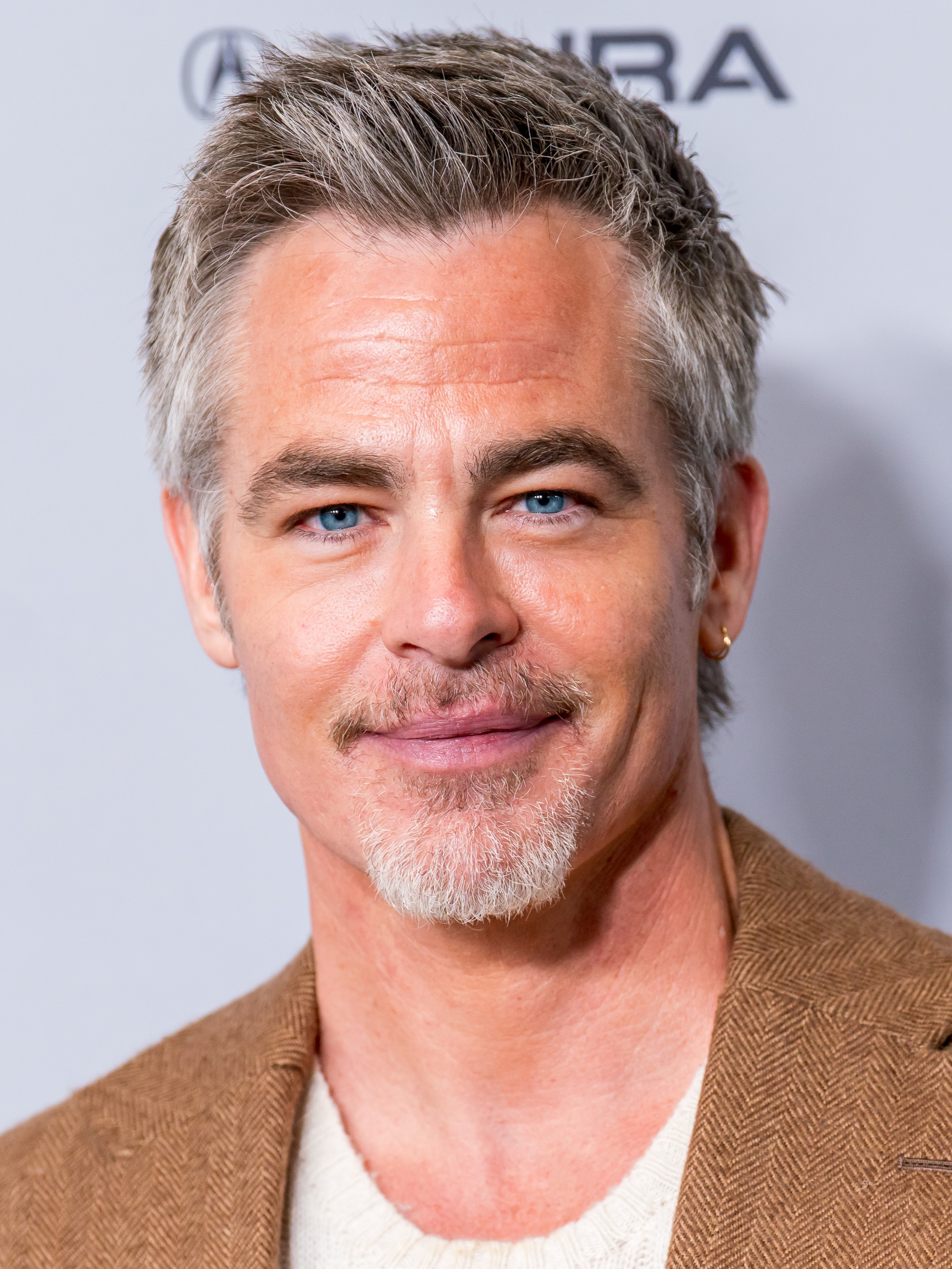
- Pine at the 2026 Sundance Film Festival
- Born: Christopher Whitelaw Pine; August 26, 1980 (age 46); Los Angeles, California, U.S.
- Education: University of California, Berkeley (BA)
- Occupation: Actor
- Years active: 2002–present
- Parents: Robert Pine; Gwynne Gilford
- Relatives: Anne Gwynne (grandmother)

Christopher Whitelaw Pine (born August 26, 1980) is an American actor. He starred as James T. Kirk in the Star Trek reboot film series (2009–2016) and as Steve Trevor in the DC Extended Universe films Wonder Woman (2017) and Wonder Woman 1984 (2020).

Pine rose to prominence for his roles in the romantic comedies The Princess Diaries 2 (2004) and Just My Luck (2006). His roles include Cinderella's Prince in Into the Woods (2014), Jack Ryan in Jack Ryan: Shadow Recruit (2014), Bernie Webber in The Finest Hours (2016), and Robert the Bruce in Outlaw King (2018). He starred in Unstoppable (2010), Rise of the Guardians (2012), Hell or High Water (2016), The Contractor (2022), Don't Worry Darling (2022), and Dungeons & Dragons: Honor Among Thieves (2023). Pine made his directorial debut with Poolman (2023). In 2025, he acted for the first time in a non-English role (Italian) in the movie The Kidnapping of Arabella, which was praised at the 2025 Venice Film Festival in the Orizzonti category.

== Early life and education ==
Pine was born on August 26, 1980, in Los Angeles, California. His father, Robert Pine, is an actor who co-starred on CHiPs as Sergeant Joseph Getraer, while his mother, Gwynne Gilford, is a former actress who became a psychotherapist. He has an older sister, Katherine, who has also acted. His maternal grandmother, Anne Gwynne, was a Hollywood actress. His maternal grandfather, Max M. Gilford, who came from a Russian Jewish family, was an attorney who was elected president of the Hollywood Bar Association.

Pine attended the Oakwood School for high school, which he described as "a Jewish liberal school in the Valley". He then attended the University of California, Berkeley, graduating in 2002 with a Bachelor of Arts in English literature. While in college, Pine wanted to find a "place where he'd belong" but had no interest in joining a fraternity. Instead, he began doing theater. As a member of the UC Berkeley Theater Department, Pine performed in a Caryl Churchill play at La Val's Subterranean Theater and performed Orestes and Shakespeare at Zellerbach Hall.

Pine was an exchange student at the University of Leeds in the United Kingdom for one year. After graduating from Berkeley, he was an apprentice at the Williamstown Theatre Festival. He also had a Berkeley professor who was an adjunct at the American Conservatory Theater in San Francisco, and it is often misstated that Pine studied at ACT himself.

== Career ==
=== 2003–2008: Early roles ===
Pine's first acting role was in a 2003 episode of ER; the same year, he also appeared in episodes of The Guardian and CSI: Miami. In 2004, he appeared in Why Germany? and in The Princess Diaries 2: Royal Engagement. Pine played the part of Nicholas Devereaux, the love interest of Anne Hathaway's leading character. In 2005, Pine appeared in an episode of the series Six Feet Under, as well as in Confession, an independent film that was released directly to video, and The Bulls, another short film.

Pine appeared in the television film Surrender, Dorothy which aired in early 2006. He played Jake Hardin in the American film Just My Luck, a 2006 romantic comedy in which he starred opposite Lindsay Lohan. Later that year, Pine appeared in the comedy Blind Dating and in the action film Smokin' Aces. Pine performed the one-man play The Atheist at Center Stage, New York, in late 2006. In 2007, he starred opposite Scott Wolf in the Los Angeles production of Neil LaBute's play Fat Pig, winning positive reviews for his depiction of a competitive alpha-male friend. He portrayed Napa Valley vintner Bo Barrett in the 2008 film Bottle Shock.

=== 2009–2016: Star Trek and worldwide recognition ===
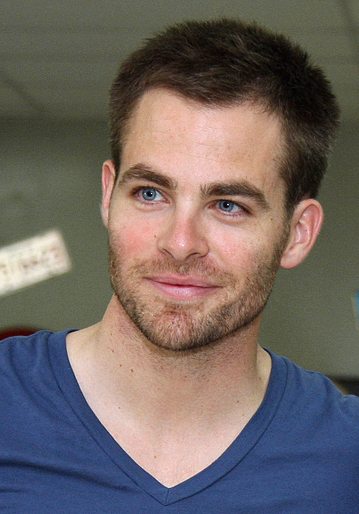
Pine attending a screening of Star Trek in 2009

In 2007, Pine turned down a role in a film adaptation of White Jazz to accept the part of James T. Kirk in the 2009 Star Trek film, which was released to critical and viewer acclaim in May of that year. That same month, he made a brief appearance promoting the film on Saturday Night Live with co-stars Zachary Quinto and Leonard Nimoy. During the rest of the summer of 2009, he appeared in the Los Angeles production of the Beau Willimon play Farragut North. Pine appeared in the Los Angeles production of The Lieutenant of Inishmore during the summer of 2010, for which he won the Los Angeles Drama Critics Circle's lead appearance award.

In the fall of 2009, Pine began work on the action film Unstoppable, directed by Tony Scott and written by Mark Bomback, which was released in November 2010. In the film, he played a young train conductor who helped a veteran railroad engineer (Denzel Washington) stop an unmanned, half-mile-long, runaway freight train carrying toxic liquids and poisonous gases from wiping out a nearby city. The Hollywood Reporter named Pine as one of the young male actors who are "pushing—or being pushed" into taking over Hollywood as the new "A-List."

In 2011, Pine sat down with William Shatner, the actor who originated the role of Captain Kirk more than 40 years earlier, for the feature-length documentary The Captains, which Shatner wrote and directed. The film had Shatner interview Pine about his career and how taking the role of Kirk felt.

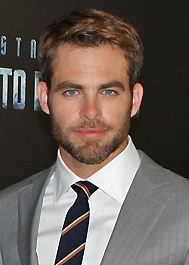
Pine at the Australian premiere of Star Trek Into Darkness in 2013

Pine filmed the romantic comedy This Means War with Reese Witherspoon and Tom Hardy during the fall of 2010 in Vancouver. This Means War was released in February 2012. Pine voiced the character of Jack Frost in Rise of the Guardians. Pine co-starred with Elizabeth Banks, Olivia Wilde, and Michelle Pfeiffer in the family drama People Like Us, which was filmed in early 2011 and released in June 2012. He reprised the role of Kirk in the sequel to 2009's Star Trek, titled Star Trek Into Darkness, released in the US on May 15, 2013.

In 2009, Pine entered talks to play CIA analyst Jack Ryan in a reboot of Tom Clancy's novels. He starred in Jack Ryan: Shadow Recruit, which was released in 2014. Pine was the fourth actor to play the character, after Alec Baldwin, Harrison Ford, and Ben Affleck. In 2014, Pine was in talks to star in a thriller about the United States Coast Guard, The Finest Hours, released in January 2016. He guest-starred in Netflix's Wet Hot American Summer: First Day of Camp and lent his voice for SuperMansion in 2015.

In May 2015, Pine was confirmed to play one of the Howard brothers along with Ben Foster in Hell or High Water (originally called Comancheria). After premiering at the 2016 Cannes Film Festival, the film was released in August 2016. Clayton Davis of Variety found Pine's performance in the film to be his best, writing that Pine "shows his reserved range as a leading man." Pine reprised the role of Kirk in Star Trek Beyond. Filming began in June 2015 in Canada, and the film was released in the US in July 2016. Also in July 2016, he received a Primetime Emmy Award nomination for Outstanding Character Voice-Over Performance for his work on the series SuperMansion. That same year, Pine was featured on singer Barbra Streisand's album Encore: Movie Partners Sing Broadway, in which the two duetted on a medley of the songs "I'll Be Seeing You" and "I've Grown Accustomed to Her Face".

=== 2017–present: Wonder Woman and continued film roles ===
In 2015, Pine was cast as Steve Trevor, opposite Gal Gadot, in the superhero film Wonder Woman. The film was released in June 2017 to positive reviews. Also in 2017, he reprised his roles in the second season of SuperMansion and the film Wet Hot American Summer: Ten Years Later, guest-starred in the third season of Angie Tribeca (including an episode where his father was also a guest star), and narrated the season two finale episode of National Geographic's Breakthrough.

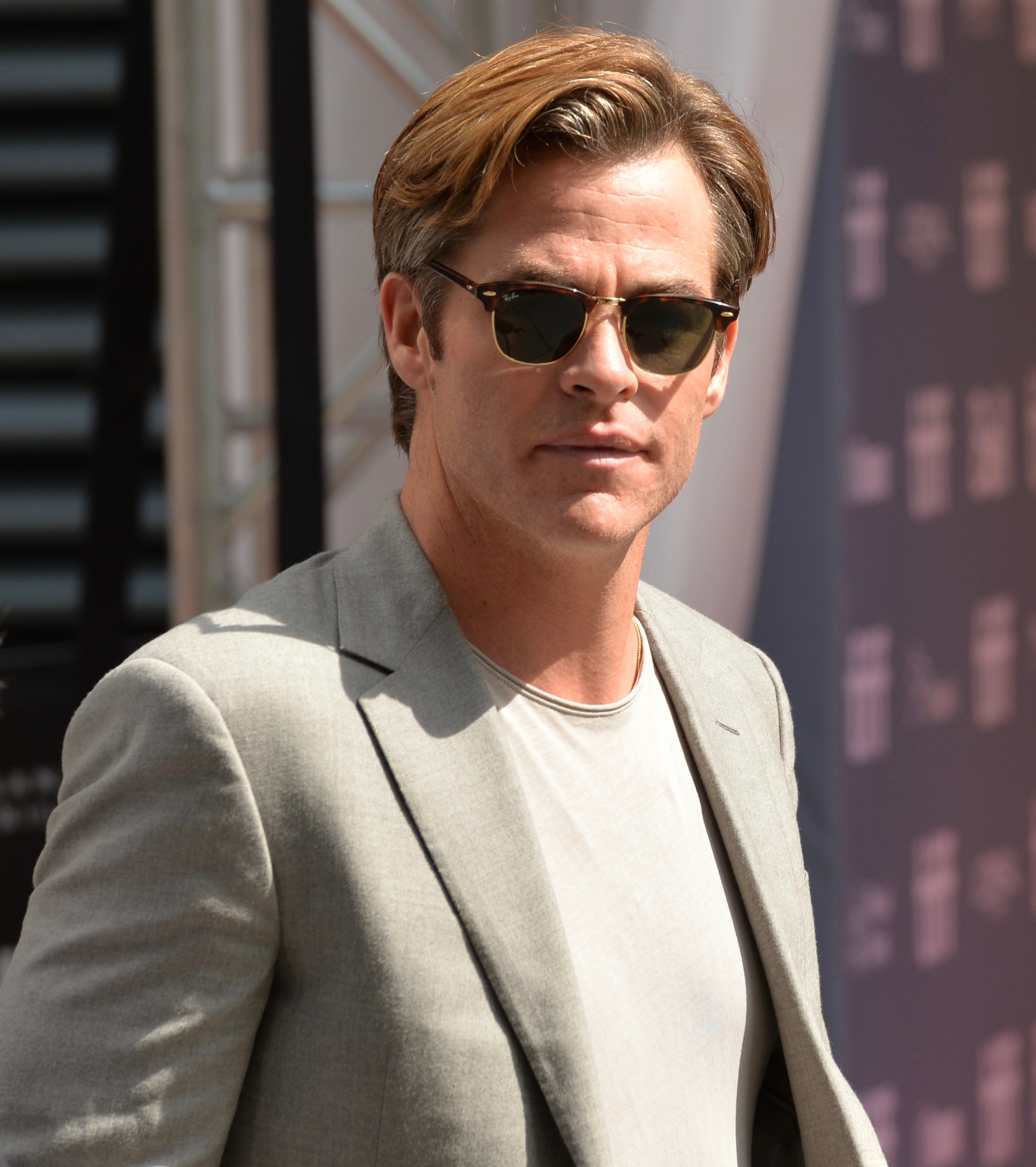
Pine attending the premiere of Outlaw King at the 2018 Toronto International Film Festival

In 2018, Pine played Dr. Alexander Murry in the fantasy film A Wrinkle in Time, based on the novel of the same name, and starred as Robert the Bruce in Outlaw King. The latter project began filming in August 2017 in Scotland and was released on Netflix in November 2018. Also that year, Pine voiced a version of Spider-Man (Peter Parker) in the animated film Spider-Man: Into the Spider-Verse. In August 2018, Pine reportedly would not be reprising his role as Kirk in the fourth film of the Star Trek film series after contract negotiations fell through.

In July 2017, the US cable network TNT announced Pine would play the role of Jay Singletary in a six-episode television drama, One Day She'll Darken. He also served as an executive producer alongside director Patty Jenkins and writer Sam Sheridan. The show, ultimately titled I Am the Night, began airing in January 2019. In 2020, Pine appeared as Westley in Home Movie: The Princess Bride for Quibi to raise money for World Central Kitchen. In June 2018, it was announced that Pine would appear in the Wonder Woman sequel, titled Wonder Woman 1984, as Steve Trevor. The film was released in December 2020. After Pine became attached to star in a film adaptation of the novel All the Old Knives in 2017, Amazon Studios picked up the film in 2020, with Pine and Thandiwe Newton starring and Janus Metz Pedersen directing. Pine also executive produced the film. The film was released in limited theaters and on streaming on Amazon Prime Video in April 2022.

Pine executive produced and starred in the 2022 action-thriller The Contractor, and appeared in Don't Worry Darling, a psychological thriller film directed by Olivia Wilde, released in September 2022. In December 2020, it was announced that Pine will star in Dungeons & Dragons: Honor Among Thieves, a film based on the role-playing game of the same name. The film, released in March 2023, was a critical but not a commercial success.

Pine made his directorial debut with the noir comedy Poolman (2023) where he also starred as the lead. The film debuted at the 2022 Toronto International Film Festival to negative reviews. The film is reportedly a comedic mystery in the vein of Chinatown (1974) and was co-produced by Patty Jenkins and co-starred Annette Bening, Danny DeVito and Ariana DeBose. Owen Gleiberman of Variety wrote, "[the film] is not only the worst film I saw during the fall festival season but would likely be one of the worst films in any year it came out", he added "At the Toronto Film Festival showing I attended, there were a lot of walkouts." The Hollywood Reporter noted, "Given its world premiere at Toronto, where it arrived looking for distribution, this TIFF stiff will likely have a tough time finding a home based on the tepid response from the customarily effusive festival audience". In August 2024, he made his debut for Italian cinema.

Pine starred in the Disney animated film Wish, providing the voice of the main antagonist King Magnifico.

== Personal life ==
Pine was in a relationship with British actress Annabelle Wallis from 2018 to early 2022. He has been in a relationship with designer Keana Sky Wenger since 2023.

On March 1, 2014, while filming Z for Zachariah in New Zealand, Pine was arrested by police near Methven after failing to pass a routine roadside breath alcohol test. He pled guilty to drunk driving on March 17, stating that he drank four vodkas at a local pub. Pine was disqualified from driving in New Zealand for six months and ordered to pay NZ$93 in reparation. He had a clean record, and the judge said that "the incident was out of character".

Pine is frequently named as part of a group of Hollywood actors commonly known as the "Hollywood Chrises", which also includes Chris Evans, Chris Hemsworth, and Chris Pratt. During his opening monologue while hosting Saturday Night Live on May 6, 2017, Pine performed a skit explaining the differences between himself and the other Chrises.

== Politics ==
Politically, Pine has called himself a "left-leaning liberal". He has said that both Democrats and Republicans tend to be interchangeable when it comes to certain actions, such as President Barack Obama's strengthening of the Patriot Act.

During the 2016 presidential campaign, he joined Star Trek franchise actors and directors George Takei, John Cho, Simon Pegg, Zachary Quinto, Zoe Saldaña, Karl Urban, Bryan Fuller, J. J. Abrams, Justin Lin, and Adam Nimoy in support of a movement called Trek Against Trump. The movement endorsed Hillary Clinton. On November 1, 2016, Pine, along with director Joss Whedon, released a video urging people to vote in the upcoming elections. While the video was a parody of Congress in general, certain commentators took the video to represent the Republican Congress. In 2020, Pine supported Joe Biden's presidential campaign.

== Filmography ==
=== Film ===
Key
†	Denotes films that have not yet been released

Year	Title	Role	Notes
2004	The Princess Diaries 2: Royal Engagement	Nicholas Devereaux	
2006	Just My Luck	Jake Hardin	
2006	Blind Dating	Danny Valdessecchi	
2006	Smokin' Aces	Darwin Tremor	
2008	Bottle Shock	Bo Barrett	
2009	Star Trek	James T. Kirk	
2009	Carriers	Brian Green	
2009	Beyond All Boundaries	Hanson Baldwin / Sgt. Bill Reed (voice)	Short film
2010	Small Town Saturday Night	Rhett Ryan	
2010	Quantum Quest: A Cassini Space Odyssey	Dave (voice)	
2010	Unstoppable	Will Colson	
2012	Celeste and Jesse Forever	Rory Shenandoah	Cameo, Credited as Kris Pino
2012	This Means War	Franklin "FDR" Foster	
2012	People Like Us	Sam Harper	
2012	Rise of the Guardians	Jack Frost (voice)	
2013	Star Trek Into Darkness	James T. Kirk	
2014	Jack Ryan: Shadow Recruit	Jack Ryan	
2014	Stretch	Roger Karos	Uncredited
2014	Horrible Bosses 2	Rex Hanson	
2014	Into the Woods	Cinderella's Prince	
2015	Z for Zachariah	Caleb	
2015	Figures of Speech	Narrator	Documentary
2016	The Finest Hours	Bernie Webber	
2016	Hell or High Water	Toby Howard	
2016	Star Trek Beyond	James T. Kirk	
2016	For the Love of Spock	Himself	Documentary
2017	Wonder Woman	Steve Trevor	
2018	A Wrinkle in Time	Dr. Alexander Murry	
2018	Outlaw King	Robert the Bruce	
2018	Spider-Man: Into the Spider-Verse	Peter Parker / Spider-Man (voice)	
2019	Love, Antosha	Himself	Documentary
2020	Wonder Woman 1984	Steve Trevor	
2022	The Contractor	James Harper	Also executive producer
2022	All the Old Knives	Henry Pelham	Also executive producer
2022	Doula	Doctor	Also producer
2022	Don't Worry Darling	Frank	
2023	Dungeons & Dragons: Honor Among Thieves	Edgin Darvis	Also executive producer
2023	Poolman	Darren Barrenman	Also director, co-writer and producer
2023	Wish	King Magnifico (voice)	
2025	The Kidnapping of Arabella	Orest D.	
2026	Carousel	Noah	Also producer
2026	Alpha Gang †		Post-production
2027	The Catch †		Post-production
2027	Yeti †		Post-production; also executive producer
2027	My Darling California †	Roland Pettigrew	Filming

=== Television ===
Year	Title	Role	Notes	Ref.
2003	ER	Levine	Episode: "A Thousand Cranes"	
2003	The Guardian	Lonnie Grandy	Episode: "Hazel Park"	
2003	CSI: Miami	Tommy Chandler	Episode: "Extreme"	
2004	American Dreams	Joey Tremain	Episode: "Tidings of Comfort and Joy"	
2005	Six Feet Under	Young Sam Hoviak	Episode: "Dancing for Me"	
2006	Surrender, Dorothy	Shawn Best	Television film	
2009, 2017	Saturday Night Live	Himself / Host	2 episodes, host in 2017	
2014–2020	Robot Chicken	Capt. Jake / Norman Bates / James T. Kirk	Voice role, 3 episodes	
2015	Wet Hot American Summer: First Day of Camp	Eric	5 episodes	
2015–2018	SuperMansion	Dr. Devizo / Robo-Dino	Voice role, Season 1: 3 episodes, Seasons 2–3: main role	
2017	Angie Tribeca	Dr. Thomas Hornbein	3 episodes	
2017	Breakthrough	Narrator	Episode: "Power to the People"	
2017	Wet Hot American Summer: Ten Years Later	Eric	4 episodes	
2019	I Am the Night	Jay Singletary	6 episodes, also executive producer	
2019	American Dad!	Alistair Covax	Voice role, episode: "Rabbit Ears"	
2020	Home Movie: The Princess Bride	Westley	Episode: "Chapter One: As You Wish"	

=== Video games ===
Year	Title	Voice role	Ref.
2013	Star Trek	James T. Kirk	

=== Music videos ===
Year	Title	Artist	Ref.
2012	"All I Want"	The Ivy Walls	
2013	"Queenie Eye"	Paul McCartney	
2018	"White Ocean"	The Ivy Walls	

=== Theater ===
Year	Title	Role	Theater	Ref.
2006	The Atheist	Augustine Early	Center Stage, NY	
2007	Fat Pig	Carter	Geffen Playhouse	
2009	Farragut North	Stephen	Geffen Playhouse	
2010	The Lieutenant of Inishmore	Padraic	Mark Taper Forum	

== Discography ==
=== Soundtracks ===
Year	Song	with	Film	Ref.
2010	"Someday Came Today"		Small Town Saturday Night	
2014	"Agony"	Billy Magnussen	Into the Woods	
2014	"Any Moment"	Emily Blunt	Into the Woods	
2023	“At All Costs” “This Is The Thanks I Get?!”	Ariana DeBose	Wish	

=== Miscellaneous ===
Year	Song	Album	Ref.
2016	"I'll Be Seeing You"/"I've Grown Accustomed to Her Face"	Encore: Movie Partners Sing Broadway (Barbra Streisand)	
2018	"Spidey Bells (A Hero's Lament)"	A Very Spidey Christmas	
2018	"Up on the House Top"	A Very Spidey Christmas	
