= Wake Up and Smell the Coffee (film) =

2001 film

- Directed by: Michael Rauch
- Written by: Eric Bogosian
- Based on: Wake Up and Smell the Coffee by Eric Bogosian
- Starring: Eric Bogosian
- Release date: 2001
- Country: United States
- Language: English

Wake Up and Smell the Coffee is a 2001 screen adaptation of Eric Bogosian's one man show of the same name. It was directed by Michael Rauch.
