= Jim Brochu =

American actor, writer, director, and playwright (born 1946)

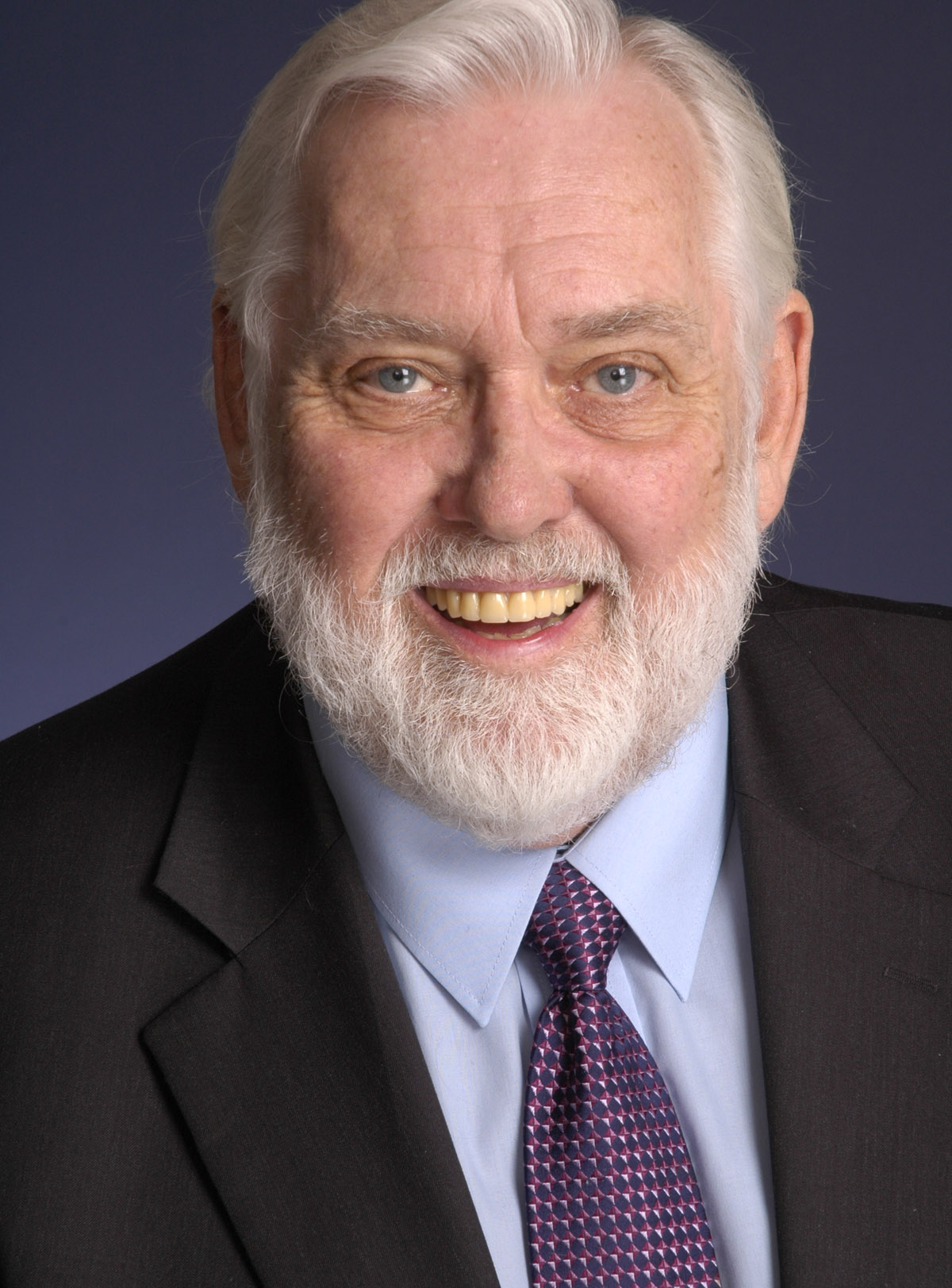
- Born: August 16, 1946 (age 80); Brooklyn, New York, U.S.
- Education: St. Francis College
- Occupations: Actor, writer, playwright, director
- Partner: Steve Schalchlin (1985–present)

Jim Brochu (born August 16, 1946) is an American actor, writer, director, and playwright. Brochu wrote and starred Off-Broadway in Zero Hour, a one-person play about the life and career of actor and comedian Zero Mostel, from 2009–2010. For this performance, he won the Drama Desk award for Outstanding Solo Performance.

== Biography ==
Brochu was born in Brooklyn, New York. He studied at Carnegie-Mellon University and received his B.A. from St. Francis College. His stage debut was in a production of William Shakespeare's Taming of the Shrew. In 2005, he was nominated by the Los Angeles Ovation Awards as Best Actor in a Musical for The Big Voice, an honor he won from both the Palm Springs Desert Star Awards and the Valley Theatre League ADA Awards. In 2007 and 2008, he and Steve Schalchlin co-wrote the musical The Big Voice: God or Merman, which Brochu starred in Off-Broadway. Honor Moore of the New York Times rated it highly. The Big Voice: God or Merman? was also given the Ovation Award as Best Musical, presented to Brochu and Schalchlin by Jerry Herman.

In June and November of 2018, Brochu revived his play Zero Hour for a limited time at the Theatre at Saint Clement’s in New York City and in The Actors’ Temple in Midtown Manhattan.

Brochu was a friend of Lucille Ball and is the author of her unauthorized biography, titled Lucy in the Afternoon, and in this capacity, appeared on an episode of MythBusters.

=== Recent Activity ===
Brochu has most recently appeared in Season 1, Episode four of The Other Two titled "Chase Gets the Gays":

- Episode originally aired February 14, 2019

== Selected filmography ==
Film	Type	Year
Law & Order	TV movie	1976
Kojak	TV series	1976
Sirota's Court	TV series	1976
All My Children	TV series	1985
Lucy & Desi: Before the Laughter	TV movie	1991
Cheers	TV series	1991
Mann & Machine	TV series	1992
Wings	TV series	1993
Mother of the Bride	TV movie	1993
Reasonable Doubts	TV series	1993
Bram & Alice	TV series	2002
