= The Atheist (play) =

The Atheist is a play written by American playwright Ronan Noone. His previous plays include The Lepers of Baile Baiste (Critics Pick, Boston Globe) and The Blowin of Baile Gall which had its Off-Broadway debut, produced by Gabriel Byrne, at the Irish arts Center in New York in 2005. The Blowin of Baile Gall was nominated by the American Theatre Critics Association for the Steinberg New Play Award and won the Elliot Norton Award for Outstanding New Script. In 2003, Noone was chosen by Boston Magazine as the Best Young Playwright of the Year. The subject of The Atheist is not God, but the religion of tabloid journalism.

== Plot ==
The Atheist is a satirical play about catching the perfect front-page headline, whatever the cost. The play follows the story of a cynical US news reporter, clawing his way up the journalistic hierarchy from trailer trash roots to notoriety and celebrity.

Central character Augustine Early drinks Bourbon and recounts his story like a "how to get famous quick" help book. He is both revolting and charismatic – a cartoon take on the tabloid journalist. Augustine Early self-divulges his story of how he perverted the justice system and preyed on a vulnerable politician in his amoral quest for fame.

As theatre critic Natasha Tripney explains:

Early is an antihero par excellence, an amusing guide through Ronan Noone's skilfully written world of American tabloid-hackery, sex scandals and trailer parks. His dark-hearted monologue is an occasionally filthy, but more importantly, in places it's laugh-out-loud funny; the writing is sharp and novelistic, the characters skilfully sketched. Early's quest for journalistic gold (and perhaps, just perhaps, a sliver of redemption) sees him encounter a wannabe actress whose tastes in the bedroom tend towards the energetic, a church-going society wife, a rapist and an English newspaper editor.

== In performance ==
=== Williamstown Theatre Festival, Williamstown, Massachusetts ===
Campbell Scott performed as Augustine Early in The Atheist between 25 June – 6 July 2008. The play was directed by Justin Waldman with sets by Cristina Todesco and lights by Ben Stanton.

=== Center Stage, New York ===
The Atheist was first performed in December at Center Stage, New York. The protagonist Augustine Early was played by Chris Pine. It was directed by David Sullivan, who also directed the Off-broadway The Blowin of Baile Gall at the Irish Arts Center.

=== Theatre 503, London ===
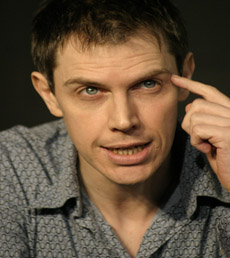
Ben Porter as Augustine Early in The Atheist at Theatre 503

The Atheist's European premiere was at Theatre 503 on 16 January 2007. The show was performed by Ben Porter and directed by Ari Edelson.
