= Laoisa Sexton =

Irish actress and short filmmaker

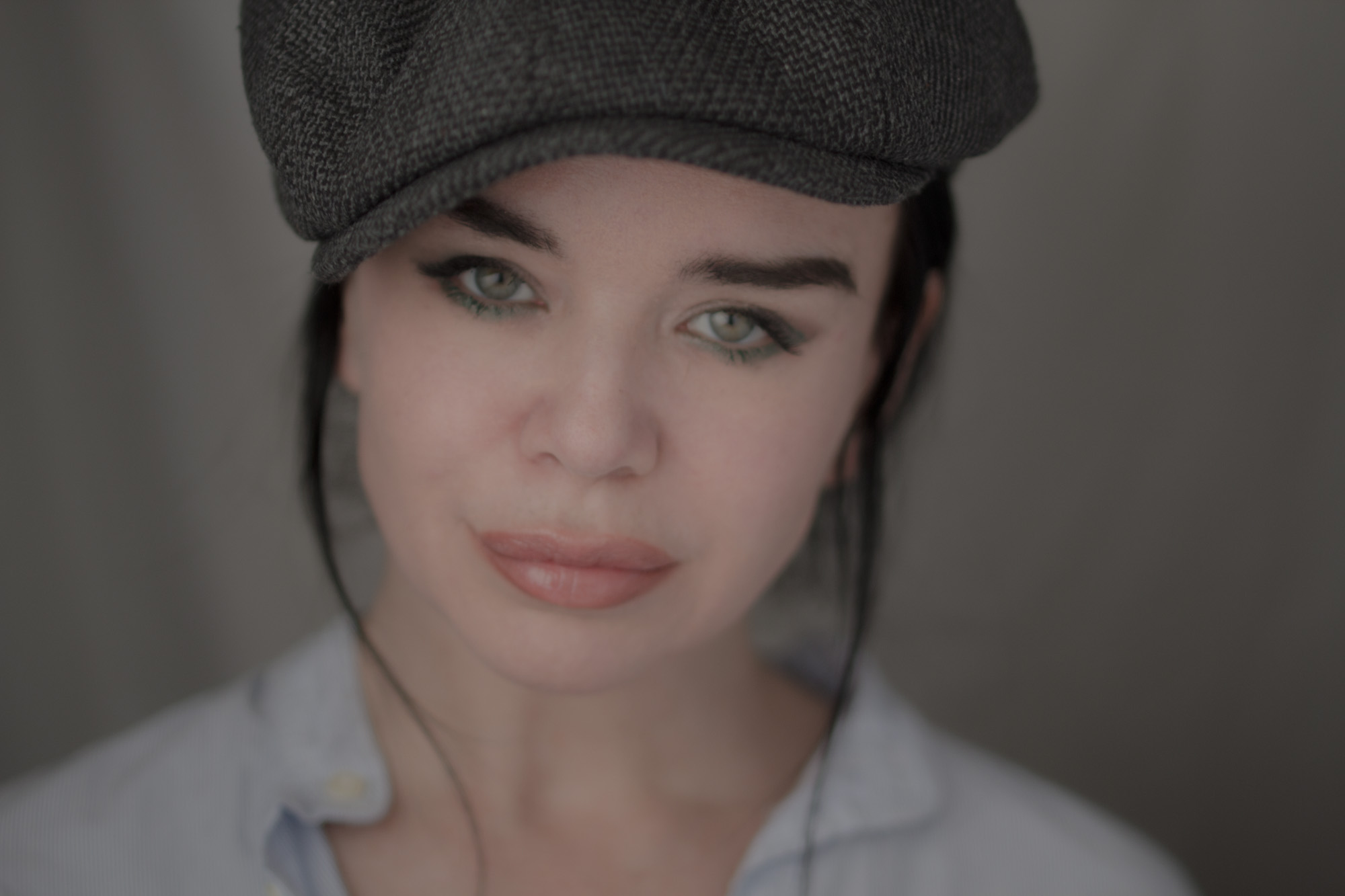
- Sexton in 2015
- Born: late 20th century County Clare, Ireland
- Occupations: Actress, Short filmmaker
- Years active: 2004–present

Laoisa Sexton is an Irish actress originally from County Clare. She studied drama in New York City and has appeared in Theatre, Film and TV in Ireland, UK and the US. Through her acting and performing, she got interested to make films. She wrote and directed and starred in the short films The Lucky Man, and I didn't... I wasn't... I amn't. and I Can't Go On. She is also a playwright, most notably for the Off Broadway hits that she also performed in For Love, The Last Days of Cleopatra and The Pigeon in the Taj Mahal. As a playwright she has created work for the Irish Repertory Theatre.

== Early life and education ==
Sexton has appeared on TV, Film and Theatre in Ireland, the UK and US. She is a native of County Clare. She studied drama in New York City.

== Career ==
Sexton is an actor and a company member of the Irish Repertory Theatre., where she has appeared in numerous plays including Gaslight, The Yeats Project, For Love, Pigeon in The Taj Mahal. Other NY Off Broadway performances include for LAByrinth Theater Company ( where she was directed by Philip Seymour Hoffman), 59E59, and at The Guthrie in Eugene O' Neill's Long Days Journey into Night directed by Joe Dowling, and Shining City by Conor Mc Pherson at Studio Theatre, Washington DC. She has appeared in a recurring role for Red Rock TV Series, as well as making her Irish acting debut in several roles on Fair City.

Performing in a lot of original plays, Sexton got inspired to write her own. Her debut play, For Love that she wrote and performed in received a NY Times Critic's pick, opening off broadway in 2013 produced by the Irish Repertory Theatre. It played to sold out audiences, and followed the run with a tour of Ireland with performances at Derry Playhouse and Grand Opera House in Belfast and Galway Town Hall. The Mail on Sunday wrote: “Sexton is a hugely talented writer and performer and one to watch”

Her follow up play, described as a pitch black family comedy drama The Last Days of Cleopatra got rave reviews and a New York Times Critics Pick, The Sunday Times wrote “Sexton’s devastatingly observed script is dark and funny sad. Artistic directors lamenting a lack of female writers need look no further”

Her third play was described as one long poem, The Pigeon in The Taj Mahal opened at the Irish Repertory Theater in 2017 directed by Alan Cox. The play was on the annual Best of lists and received rave reviews.

Making promo trailers for her plays Sexton was inspired to write and direct her own films. She wrote and directed her debut film I Didn't... I Wasn't...I Amn't set in Dublin, and starred opposite veteran Irish actor Aidan Gillen. She played a lonely young woman who agrees on a nocturnal meeting with an older, wealthier man against her better judgement. This dark comedy about female desire had a hugely successful festival run and was nominated by the Writer's Guild Ireland for Best Short Film and picked up several awards internationally including Best Actress. "A beautifully observed film that crackles with wit & sharpness” wrote Irish Central. Hotpress magazine wrote the film "Grapples with sex and danger"

In 2023, her second film The Lucky Man premiered at Galway Film Fleadh and received positive reviews. The film was nominated for several awards internationally and received multiple awards at LOCO, London Comedy Film Festival.The film was also featured on RTE Shortscreen

Sexton was awarded funding from Screen Ireland to make her third short film I Can't Go On which premiered in Ireland at Galway Film Fleadh and Dublin Film Festival in 2025

== Filmography ==
- I Can't Go On- 2024- writer/director
- The Ulysses Project - 2022 - Zoe Higgins / Gerty McDowell / co-director
- In the Woods with a Dead Dog - (Short) directed by Vera Graziadei - 2021 - Patsy
- The Lucky Man - (Short) - 2020 - Ursula, writer/director
- Poster Boys -2020 - Sheila Matthews
- I didn't... I wasn't... I amn't - (Short) - 2018 - Bee, writer/director
- You Are Beautiful (Short)- 2015 - Angie
- Red Rock - (TV Series) - 2016/7 - Mary Flood
- Fair City (TV Series) -2004/5 - Denise
