= BBC Radio Drama Awards =

BBC Radio Drama Awards may refer to:

- BBC Audio Drama Awards
- BBC Northern Island Radio Drama Awards
