= Joseph Baldi =

Deceased American serial killer (1941–2009)

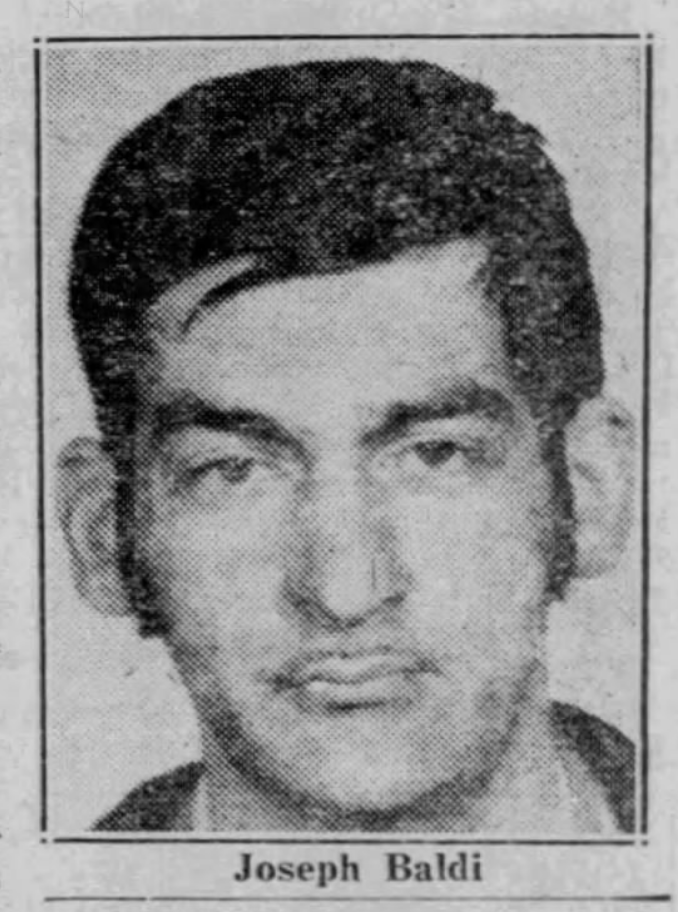
- Mugshot (c. 1974)
- Born: January 16, 1941; Richmond Hill, Queens, New York, U.S.
- Died: October 17, 2009 (aged 68); Sing Sing, Ossining, New York, U.S.
- Other names: "The Queens Creeper" "The Monster of Queens"
- Convictions: Murder x4 Attempted murder x1
- Penalty: Life imprisonment x2

Details
- Victims: 4
- Span of crimes: 1970–1972
- Country: United States
- State: New York
- Date apprehended: June 21, 1972

Joseph Baldi (January 16, 1941 – October 17, 2009), known as The Queens Creeper, was an American serial killer who, from 1970 to 1972, stabbed four women and girls to death in the Jamaica neighborhood of Queens, New York City. His case, along with those of Charles Yukl and Ricardo Caputo, garnered notoriety due to the fact that Baldi had been erroneously released after he was deemed mentally ill, allowing him to claim more victims. For these crimes, he was found guilty and sentenced to a 25-year-to-life sentence at Sing Sing, which he served until his death in 2009.

== Biography ==
Little is known of Baldi's background. Born on January 16, 1941, in the Richmond Hill section of Queens, he became a petty criminal from a young age, frequently burglarizing various homes. He displayed signs of mental illness, for which he was treated at the Creedmoor State Hospital between April 1962 and January 1967. While there, he studied carpentry in the institution's workshop.

=== Murder of Areti Koularmanis ===
On September 19, 1970, Baldi was searching for an apartment, choosing one at 144-96 88th Avenue in Jamaica. After going into a back alley and climbing through the window, he found himself in the bedroom of 23-year-old Greek-Canadian Areti Koularmanis, who was visiting her husband's parents together with her children. To prevent her from screaming, Baldi took out a knife and stabbed her in the throat, causing Koularmanis to stagger out of the room and wake her husband, before collapsing on the floor. She was driven to the Mary Immaculate Hospital, where she subsequently succumbed to her injuries, Baldi managed to escape and avoid arrest. Despite the police's best efforts, they were unable to find a clue to the killer's identity.

=== Attempted murder, imprisonment and release ===
After Koularmanis's murder, Baldi continued breaking into ground-floor apartments around the Richmond Hill and Woodhaven areas. In the early hours of September 5, 1971, a resident of Woodhaven reported seeing a man climbing through a neighbor's window. Officers John Hamberger and Frank Mobileo were sent to investigate, and after briefly patrolling of the area, they caught up with Baldi and went to question him. As they were about to do so, Baldi whipped out a .22 revolver from his hip holster and attempted to shoot Hamberger, but the gun misfired. Before he could fire again, the officers apprehended him. While examining the detainee's belongings, they found a stolen driver's license. When the owner of the license was contacted, she said that someone had burgled her apartment and had stolen both her driver's license and money from her purse. For these crimes, Baldi was charged with attempted murder, burglary, theft and illegal possession of weaponry.

Due to his history of mental illness, Baldi was remanded to the Mid-Hudson Psychiatric Hospital in Beacon to undergo treatment while awaiting his trial. He stayed there until November 30, when he was moved back to Creedmoor. In December 1971, he was officially indicted for the aforementioned charges by a grand jury in Queens, but because the attorney's office was not notified of his transfer to Creedmoor and the subsequent failure of that institution to be notified of his indictment, he was released a little over a month later on January 21, 1972.

=== New murders and arrest ===
Less than two months after his release, Baldi resumed his criminal activities, escalating the violence of his attacks. On March 18, he entered an apartment in Jamaica through a first-story window, going into the bedroom of 17-year-old Camille Perniola. A mentally disabled teenager who lived with her parents, Perniola was stabbed to death in her sleep, and her assailant fled before her parents could catch a glimpse of him.

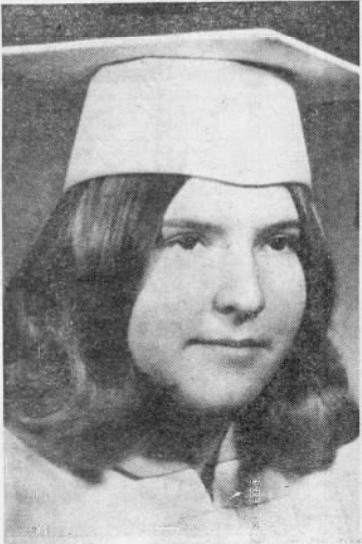
Deborah "Debbie" Januszko, Baldi's final victim

On April 13, Baldi broke into the ground-floor apartment of 21-year-old secretary Clara Toriello, who had recently been engaged to a policeman. Despite the fact that she shared the apartment with three family members, Baldi managed to stab her four times in the back and neck after he found her lying in her bed. After killing her, he tore off her bra and panties and then slashed them to shreds. The final attack came on June 17, when Baldi entered an apartment near his rooming house in Jamaica, stabbing 15-year-old Deborah "Debbie" Januszko in the chest. The girl staggered into her parents' bedroom, exclaiming that she had just been stabbed, but before help could arrive, she succumbed to her injuries.

A few days after her murder, some of Januszko's classmates reported to police that they had been stalked by a tall, thin, dark-haired man, matching the description given by other women who had reported similar incidents. On June 21, two detectives from the Queens Homicide Squad, Donald Parker and Michael Walsh, stopped a man matching that description while he was walking down the street. The man was Baldi and he agreed to accompany them to the police station, and not long after, he told that he "might have hurt" Januszko. Further inquiries uncovered that Baldi was also wanted for an attempted murder of a police officer. He was eventually charged with the other three murders, to which he had made passing references in some of his confessions.

=== Confessions, trial and impact ===
Baldi (right) being escorted by Detective Angelo Lamardo following his arrest

In light of his crimes, it was decided that Baldi would first be brought to trial for the attempted murder of Officer Hamberger, to which he pleaded not guilty by reason of insanity. At the court hearings for the case, Baldi's attorney, Sidney Sparrow, argued that his client was a schizophrenic suffering from dissociative identity disorder (then called "multiple personality disorder") and was thus not legally liable for his crimes. On the prosecution's side, Dr. Daniel J. Schwartz, then-director for the Kings County Hospital's Psychiatric Unit, testified that after conducting an exam on the defendant, he deduced that he was aware of his actions when he attacked the officer. After an 8-day long trial, Baldi was convicted of the attempted murder charge and sentenced to 25 years imprisonment, allowing the prosecutors to move forward with the murder charges.

In lieu of the upcoming trial, an agreement between Sparrow and the prosecutors was made that prohibited Baldi's "reenactments" of his murders, during which he walked around opening imaginary doors and wiping blood off imaginary knives in a trance-like state, to be used as evidence. In contrast, prosecutors produced a 45-minute police tape to the court, in which Baldi confessed to the four murders. However, New York Supreme Court Justice Thomas Agresta dismissed the charges in the Koularmanis, Perniola and Toriello murders, citing that Baldi's attorney was only representing him in the Januszko case. The district attorney later attempted to overrule this decision, but the outcome of it is not known.

Concerning the confession tape, Baldi later took the stand and declared that he had no recollection of making such admissions. Sparrow and Dr. Harry LaBurt, a psychiatrist and former head of the Creedmoor State Hospital, later took the stand to present testimony such as exam records and interviews that showcased that Baldi was insane. Despite their efforts, the Presiding Supreme Court Justice, George J. Balbach, ruled that Baldi was fully aware of his actions and found him guilty as charged in the Januszko case. He was then imposed a 25-year-to-life sentence to be served at Sing Sing, which Baldi unsuccessfully attempted to appeal over the years. Baldi would remain behind bars for the remainder of his life, before dying in Sing Sing on October 17, 2009, from undisclosed causes.

The decision to release Baldi from the mental hospital for being a "model inmate" garnered great controversy with the contemporary public in New York City. At the time, he was compared to murderer Charles Yukl and fellow serial killer Ricardo Caputo, both of whom were also considered model inmates but continued killing after their release.

== See also ==
- List of serial killers in the United States

== Bibliography ==
- Gerry Looney (August 2019). Night Prowlers: A Collection of True Crime. Independently Published. ISBN 9781087014883.
