= Justine Stafford =

Irish presenter, writer and comedian (born 1993 or 1994)

- Born: 1993 or 1994 (age 32–33)
- Citizenship: Irish
- Occupations: Presenter, writer, comedian, podcaster

Justine Stafford (born 1993 or 1994) is an Irish comedian, writer, podcaster and television presenter.

== Early and personal life ==
Stafford grew up on a farm in Kilbeg, just outside Nobber, in County Meath, Ireland. She has one brother, called Lorcán. She attended Kilbeg National School where she was introduced to a short-film project for primary schools called Fís Films for which she won a national prize in Dublin. She began making her own comedy films after receiving a Camcorder the following Christmas, aged 11. From 13 Stafford suffered from anorexia and around this time won an award at Fresh Films Ireland’s Young Filmmaker of the Year Awards held in Limerick. Stafford subsequently was the Irish representative taking her winning short film to an international youth film festival held in South Korea. In March, 2021 Stafford herself co-hosted the Ireland's Young Filmmaker of the Year Awards online.

== Career ==
=== On-line ===
Stafford studied film and broadcasting at the Dublin Institute of Technology after which worked for the radio station FM104 and spent five years at JOE.ie as senior social creative and content creator. She became a comedic presence on social media, including for posts based on comedically creative Halloween costumes, social commentary, and satire on popular television programmes. From June 2021 until September 2022 Stafford co-hosted, with Martin Angolo and Dermot Ward, the podcast The Substantial Meal. With shows available online as well as performed at live events and festivals, Stafford described the format as “three friends recreating the atmosphere of being in a pub by sharing embarrassing stories, giving life advice and solving the world's big problems.” Since June 2024 Stafford has co-hosted the podcast The Lovely Show with fellow comedian Kevin McGahern.

In 2024, Stafford narrated the RTÉ Doc on One podcast series The Real Carrie Jade.

=== Film and television ===
In 2019 Stafford was a finalist in Irish TV's Stand Up And Be Funny competition. In 2021 Stafford co-hosted television food game show Battle of the Food Trucks with James Patrice on RTE Player. The series was renewed for a second season that aired in 2022. In 2021 Stafford also had a role in Irish film Poster Boys, starring Keith Duffy, amongst others.

Stafford also appeared on both series of RTÉ player comedy series Darren & Joe's Free Gaff in 2021 and 2022. In February 2023 Stafford appeared on a Valentine's Day special edition of the Late Late Show and added "an honestly impressive and possibly Guinness Book of Records-worthy number of innuendoes into such a brief window", and "salty double-entendres".

From 2022, Stafford appeared with Emma Doran, Sean Burke, Killian Sundermann and Michael Fry as writers and performers on the RTÉ 2 No Worries If Not! The series was, according to RTÉ director of content Jim Jennings, "a vehicle for young comedy talent", with a sketch comedy format that may have been enhanced, Stafford noted, by the COVID-19 pandemic that had "created a rich period for the phenomenon of the online comedy video". In March 2026, the series was nominated at the Royal Television Society Republic of Ireland Awards in the Entertainment category.
