= John McMartin =

American actor (1929–2016)

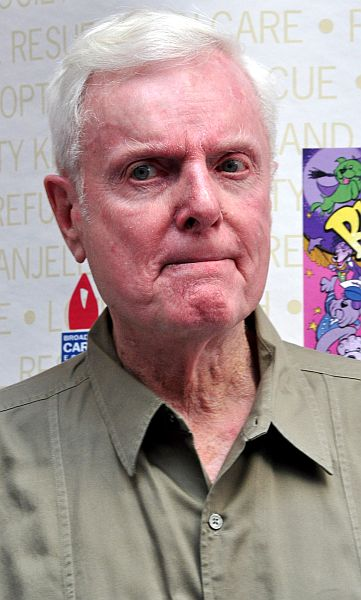
- McMartin in July 2011
- Born: John Francis McMartin; August 21, 1929; Warsaw, Indiana, U.S.
- Died: July 6, 2016 (aged 86); New York City, U.S.
- Occupations: Actor, singer
- Years active: 1956–2015
- Spouse: Cynthia Baer (m. 1960; div. 1971)
- Partner: Charlotte Moore
- Children: 2

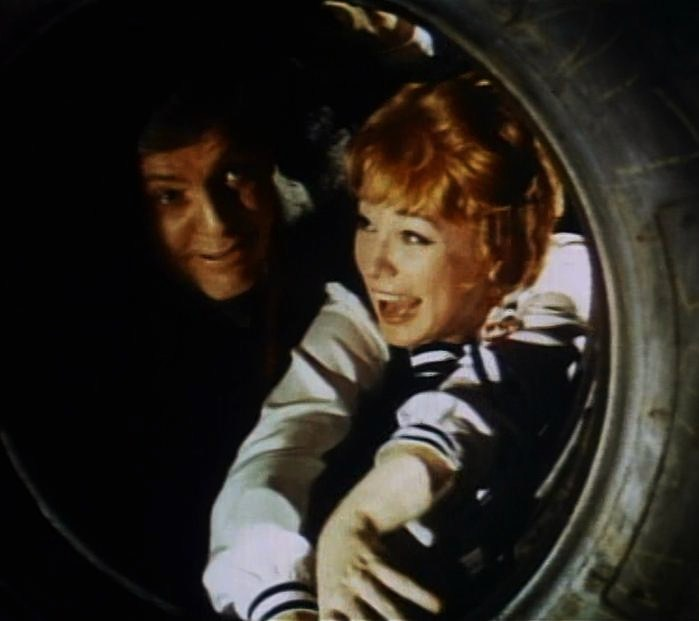
John McMartin and Shirley MacLaine in Sweet Charity (1969)

John Francis McMartin (August 21, 1929 – July 6, 2016) was an American actor of stage, film, and television. He made his off-Broadway debut in Little Mary Sunshine in 1959, and acted on Broadway for more than 50 years. He won a Theatre World Award in 1960 and was nominated for a Tony for his role in Sweet Charity in 1966. On television, McMartin appeared on the soap opera As the World Turns, and the TV shows East Side West Side, Beauty and the Beast, The Golden Girls,The Bob Newhart Show, and Murder, She Wrote. He also had film roles in All the President's Men (1976), Blow Out, and Legal Eagles.

== Life and career ==
McMartin was born in Warsaw, Indiana, on August 21, 1929, and raised in St. Cloud, Minnesota. After graduating from high school, he joined the United States Army and became a paratrooper in the 101st Airborne Division. He attended Columbia College Chicago, but did not graduate and later attended college in New York. He made his off-Broadway debut in Little Mary Sunshine in 1959, opposite Eileen Brennan and Elmarie Wendel. He won a Theatre World Award for his role as Corporal Billy Jester, and married one of the show's producers, Cynthia Baer, in 1960; they divorced in 1971.

McMartin's first Broadway appearance was as Forrest Noble in The Conquering Hero in 1961, which was followed by Blood, Sweat and Stanley Poole. He created the role of Oscar in Sweet Charity in 1966, opposite Gwen Verdon, garnering a Tony nomination, and played the role again in the 1969 film opposite Shirley MacLaine. He was reportedly cast in Stephen Sondheim's A Funny Thing Happened on the Way to the Forum in 1962, but his role was cut before the show opened.

McMartin later starred in the original Broadway production of Sondheim's Follies opposite Alexis Smith in 1971 as Benjamin Stone, introducing the ballad "The Road You Didn't Take". His association with Sondheim continued, as he appeared in A Little Night Music as Frederick at the Ahmanson Theatre, Los Angeles, in 1991. The reviewer for the Orange County Register wrote that McMartin was "aggressively deadpan as her rediscovered old flame".

He appeared in the first Broadway revival of Into the Woods in 2002, in the dual role of the Narrator and the Mysterious Man.

Other Broadway roles include the Narrator in Happy New Year, Ben in A Little Family Business (adapted by Jay Presson Allen, 1982), Donner in Tom Stoppard's Artist Descending a Staircase, Cap'n Andy in Kern and Hammerstein's Show Boat (1994), and Uncle Willie in Cole Porter's High Society (1998). He also had a role as the American Revolutionary naval hero John Paul Jones in the unsuccessful Loesser/Spewack musical Pleasures and Palaces, which closed in Detroit. In regional theater, he originated the role of Benteen in the Folger Theater Group's 1979 production of Custer at the Kennedy Center.

McMartin was a leading member of the New Phoenix Repertory Company during its three Broadway seasons in the early 1970s, appearing onstage in Eugene O'Neill's The Great God Brown (opposite Katherine Helmond), Molière's Dom Juan, and Luigi Pirandello's The Rules of the Game.

McMartin played Anton Schell opposite Chita Rivera in Kander and Ebb's musical The Visit at the Goodman Theatre. He created the roles of J.V. "Major" Bouvier and Norman Vincent Peale in Grey Gardens, opposite Mary Louise Wilson and Christine Ebersole. He played Thomas Jefferson in the original cast of John Guare's A Free Man of Color at Lincoln Center (2010–11), and Elisha Whitney in the 2011 Broadway revival of Anything Goes, opposite Jessica Walter.

On television, McMartin appeared on the soap opera As the World Turns as Ed Rice. He was later in the CBS drama East Side West Side and the first two seasons of Beauty and the Beast (1987) as Charles Chandler, father of Catherine (Linda Hamilton). He also appeared in The Golden Girls (Season 2) as Frank Leahy who, unbeknownst to Dorothy (Bea Arthur) who is romantically attracted to him, is a priest. He appeared as the Rev. Dr. Dan Bradford on The Bob Newhart Show in "Somebody Down Here Likes Me". He appeared on Cheers in "The Visiting Lecher". He appeared as radio personality Fletcher Grey on Frasier. He appeared in four episodes of Murder, She Wrote. He also appeared as Shirley Jones's love interest in The Partridge Family episode "When Mother Gets Married".

McMartin's film roles include the foreign editor in All the President's Men (1976), a senator in Brubaker (1980), a political advisor in Blow Out (1981), and millionaire Mr. Forrester in Legal Eagles (1986).

== Death ==
McMartin died of cancer in Manhattan on July 6, 2016, aged 86. He was survived by his longtime partner, actress Charlotte Moore, artistic director of the Irish Repertory Theatre; and by his two daughters from his marriage to Cynthia Baer.

== Filmography ==
=== Film ===
Year	Title	Role	Notes
1965	A Thousand Clowns	The Man in the Office	
1968	What's So Bad About Feeling Good?	The Mayor	
1969	Sweet Charity	Oscar	
1976	All the President's Men	Foreign Editor	
1977	Thieves	Gordon	
1980	Brubaker	Senator Charles Hite	
1981	Blow Out	Lawrence Henry	
1981	Pennies From Heaven	Mr. Warner	
1986	Dream Lover	Martin	
1986	Legal Eagles	Robert Forrester	
1986	Native Son	Mr. Dalton	
1987	Who's That Girl	Simon Worthington	
1989	Little Sweetheart	Uncle David	
1990	A Shock to the System	George Brewster	
1998	Three Businessmen	Liverpool Businessman	
2000	The Dish	U.S. Ambassador Howard	
2004	Kinsey	Huntington Hartford	
2007	No Reservations	Mr. Peterson	

=== Television ===
Year	Title	Role	Notes
1956	As the World Turns	Ed Rice	
1958	Armstrong Circle Theatre	Performer	Episode: "The Invisible Mark"
1961	Frontiers of Faith	Man	Episode: "Let Us Build a Tower"
1963	The DuPont Show of the Week	Bill Wilks	Episode: "Ride with Terror"
1963	Ride with Terror	Bill Wilks	Television movie
1964	East Side/West Side	Mike Miller	3 episodes
1964	The Doctors and the Nurses	William Devon	Episode: "A Postcard from Yucatan"
1964	Mr. Broadway	Robertson	Episode: "Try to Find a Spy"
1965	Profiles in Courage	Tumulty	Episode: "Woodrow Wilson"
1965	A Flame in the Wind	Ted	2 episodes
1968	Premiere	John Higher / Professor Josh Enders	2 episodes
1969	Judd, for the Defense	Don Townsend	Episode: "Visitation"
1969	Medical Center	Dan Caldwell	Episode: "A Life Is Waiting"
1970	Marcus Welby, M.D.	John Ambrose	Episode: "Fun and Games and John Ambrose"
1970	Ritual of Evil	Edward Bolander	Television movie
1970	The Partridge Family	Larry Metcalfe	Episode: "When Mother Gets Married"
1970	Insight	Chipper	Episode: "Chipper"
1971	Hawaii Five-O	Ron Nicholson	2 episodes
1971	Love, American Style	Peter Ferguson	Episode: "Love and the Duel/Love and the Note/Love and the Young Unmarrieds"
1971	God Bless Mr. Ferguson	Performer	Television movie
1973	The Bob Newhart Show	Reverend Daniel Bradford	Episode: "Somebody Down Here Likes Me"
1974	Harry O	Jordan Briggs	Episode: "The Admiral's Lady"
1975	Cannon	Senator Arlen Andrews	Episode: "Nightmare"
1975	Fear on Trial	Tom Murray	Television movie
1975–76	Phyllis	Jerome Patterson	2 episodes
1975–81	Great Performances	Leone Gala / Teddy Wharton	2 episodes
1976	Fay	Dr. Walter	Episode: "Fay and the Doctor"
1976	The Rockford Files	Timson Farrell	Episode: "The Fourth Man"
1976	The Fatal Weakness	Paul Espenshade	Television movie
1976	The Mary Tyler Moore Show	Barry Munroe	Episode: "Mary Gets a Lawyer"
1978	The Defection of Simas Kudirka	Phillip Chadway	Television movie
1979	Dear Detective	Performer	Episode #1.4
1980	The Greatest Man in the World	Ames Herbert	Television movie
1981	Hart to Hart	Cole Morefeld	Episode: "Murder Wrap"
1982–84	American Playhouse	Paul Melton / William Marbury	2 episodes
1983	The Last Ninja	Mr. Cosmo	Television movie
1984–86	Magnum, P.I.	Jason Bryan / Bill Campbell	2 episodes
1985–86	Falcon Crest	Julian J. Roberts	8 episodes
1985–91	Murder, She Wrote	Various roles	4 episodes
1986	Murrow	Frank Stanton	Television movie
1986	Kay O'Brien	Jack O'Brien	Episode: "Don't Bother Kayo It's Chinatown"
1987	The Golden Girls	Father Frank Leahy	Episode: "Forgive Me, Father"
1987–89	Beauty and the Beast	Charles Chandler	4 episodes
1988	Lincoln	Salmon P. Chase	2 episodes
1988	Roots: The Gift	Edmund Parker Sr.	Television movie
1989	Tattingers	Frederick Lund	Episode: "Broken Windows"
1989	Day One	Dr. Arthur Compton	Television movie
1989	Cheers	Dr. Lawrence Crandell	Episode: "The Visiting Lecher"
1990–92	Coach	Judge Watkins	2 episodes
1991	Separate but Equal	Governor James F. Byrnes	Television miniseries
1992	Empty Nest	Reverend Chambers	Episode: "The Son of a Preacherman"
1992	Citizen Cohn	Older Doctor	Television movie
1992	Sisters	J.D. Fitzway	Episode: "Portrait of the Artists"
1992–2009	Law & Order	Various roles	5 episodes
1993	Ghostwriter	Alan Charles	Episode: "Who's Who – Part 3"
1993	Bob	Dr. O'Reilly	Episode: "Better to How Loved and Flossed"
1994	Frasier	Fletcher Grey	Episode: "And the Whimper Is..."
1997–98	Touched by an Angel	Earl Gray / Ed Greeley	2 episodes
1999	Spin City	Senator Joseph Grady	Episode: "The Thanksgiving Show"
2000	Oz	Lars Nathan	2 episodes
2001	Further Tales of the City	Royal Reichenbach	3 episodes
2015	Unbreakable Kimmy Schmidt	Grant	Episode: "Kimmy Goes on a Date!"

== Stage ==
=== Broadway ===
Year	Title	Role	Venue
1961	The Conquering Hero	Forrest Noble	ANTA Washington Square Theatre
1961	Blood, Sweat and Stanley Poole	Captain Mal Malcolm	Ambassador Theatre
1963	Children From Their Games	Sidney Balzer	Morosco Theatre
1963	A Rainy Day in Newark	Edward L. Voorhees	Belasco Theater
1966	Sweet Charity	Oscar	Palace Theatre
1971–72	Follies	Benjamin Stone	Winter Garden Theatre
1972–73	The Great God Brown	Dion Anthony	Lyceum Theatre
1972–73	Dom Juan	Sganarelle	Lyceum Theatre
1973	Sondheim: A Musical Tribute	Performer	Benefit Concert, Shubert Theatre
1973–74	The Visit	Anton Schill	Ethel Barrymore Theatre
1973–74	Chemin de Fer	Fedot	Ethel Barrymore Theatre
1974	Love for Love	Foresight	Helen Hayes Theatre
1974	The Rules of the Game	Leone Gala	Helen Hayes Theatre
1980	Happy New Year	Narrator	Morosco Theater
1982	Solomon's Child	Allan	Little Theatre
1982	A Little Family Business	Ben	Martin Beck Theatre
1989	Artist Descending a Staircase	Donner	Helen Hayes Theatre
1994–97	Show Boat	Cap'n Andy	Gershwin Theatre
1998	High Society	Uncle Willie	St. James Theatre
2002	Into the Woods	The Mysterious Man / The Narrator	Broadhurst Theatre
2004	Passion	Doctor Tambourri	Special benefit concert
2006	Grey Gardens	J.V. "Major" Bouvier; Norman Vincent Peale	Walter Kerr Theatre
2007	Is He Dead?	Papa Leroux	Lyceum Theatre
2009	Chance & Chemistry	Performer	Minskoff Theatre
2010	Sondheim! The Birthday Concert	Performer	New York Philharmonic
2010	A Free Man of Color	Thomas Jefferson	Vivian Beaumont Theatre
2011	Anything Goes	Elisha Whitney	Stephen Sondheim Theatre
2014	All the Way	Richard Russell, Jr.	Neil Simon Theatre

=== Off-Broadway ===
Year	Title	Role	Venue
1959	Little Mary Sunshine	Cpl."Billy" Jester	Cherry Lane Theatre
1964	Too Much Johnson	Mr. Billings	Phoenix Theatre
1977	The Misanthrope	Alceste	The Public Theater
1988	Julius Caesar	Julius Caesar	The Public Theater
2005	Thrill Me: The Leopold & Loeb Story	Parole Board (voiceover)	York Theatre
2006	Grey Gardens	Major Bouvier; Norman Vincent Peale	Playwrights Horizons
2006	Indian Blood	Eddie's Grandfather	Primary Stages Theatre
2008	Saturn Returns	Performer	Mitzi E. Newhouse Theatre
2013	The Explorers Club	Professor Sloane	Manhattan Theatre Club

=== Other theatre credits ===
Year	Title	Role	Venue
1977	Follies	Benjamin Stone	National Tour
1991	A Little Night Music	Frederick Egerman	Berkshire Theatre Festival; Ahmanson Theatre, Los Angeles
1996–98	Show Boat	Cap'n Andy	National Tour
2001	The Visit	Anton	Goodman Theatre, Chicago
2002	Into the Woods	The Mysterious Man / The Narrator	Ahmanson Theatre
2010	Paradise Found	Shah	West End

== Awards and nominations ==
Year	Award	Category	Title	Result
1960	Theatre World Award	—N/a	Little Mary Sunshine	Won
1966	Tony Award	Best Featured Actor – Musical	Sweet Charity	Nominated
1973	Tony Award	Best Featured Actor in a Play	Dom Juan	Nominated
1973	Drama Desk Award	Outstanding Performance	Dom Juan	Won
1973	Drama Desk Award	Outstanding Performance	The Great God Brown	Won
1995	Tony Award	Best Actor in a Musical	Show Boat	Nominated
1998	Tony Award	Best Featured Actor in a Musical	High Society	Nominated
1998	Drama Desk Award	Outstanding Featured Actor in a Musical	High Society	Nominated
1998	Outer Critics Circle Award	Best Featured Actor in a Musical	High Society	Nominated
2002	Tony Award	Best Actor in a Musical	Into the Woods	Nominated
2006	Drama Desk Award	Outstanding Featured Actor in a Musical	Grey Gardens	Nominated
2011	Outer Critics Circle Awards	Outstanding Featured Actor in a Musical	Anything Goes	Nominated
2014	Outer Critics Circle Awards	Outstanding Featured Actor in a Play	All the Way	Nominated

Honor

- 2009 Inducted into the American Theater Hall of Fame.
