= Abbie Spallen =

Northern Irish playwright

- Occupation: Playwright
- Notable work: Pumpgirl
- Awards: Susan Smith Blackburn Prize (2007); Windham-Campbell Literature Prize (2016)

Abbie Spallen is a Northern Irish actress and playwright, who was jointly awarded the Susan Smith Blackburn Prize in 2007. In 2016 she was awarded a Windham-Campbell Literature Prize, with the citation describing how her "plays confront audiences with all the awkward questions, reminding us with thrilling proof that theatre can still be urgently necessary". Her works have been compared to a variety of authors, including Gillian Greer, Brian Friel, David Ireland, Martin Lynch, Mark O'Rowe and Conor McPherson.

== Early life ==
Spallen grew up on a council estate in Newry, Northern Ireland. After finishing her A-Levels she went to art college, where she joined a group of New Age travellers. After leaving the group, Spallen worked as an actor and a voice-over artist.

== Career ==
In 2007 Spallen was one of four women who were all awarded the Susan Smith Blackburn Prize; the other winners were Lucy Caldwell, Sheila Callaghan and Stella Feehily. Spallen was awarded the prize for her work Pumpgirl. This was her second play and it had premiered in 2006. In 2009 she was awarded the Stewart Parker Trust New Playwright Bursary, also for Pumpgirl. In a 2015 review of her play Lally the Scut, Spallen was described by critic Helen Meaney as "a playwright of intellect and ambition".

In 2016 she was awarded a Windham-Campbell Literature Prize, with the citation describing how her "plays confront audiences with all the awkward questions, reminding us with thrilling proof that theatre can still be urgently necessary". The prize was $150,000. A 2017 review by The Times of Pumpgirl described Spallen as a writer with "no time for sentimentality". To research her play Sheep on Fire in Penal Australia, Spallen travelled to Norfolk Island. One act of the play was published in The Guardian in 2020.

== Analysis ==
Spallen's works are inspired by Irish identities and landscape. In her analysis for Northern Irish literature after the Good Friday Agreement, Birte Heidemann uses Pumpgirl as a case study and argues that Spallen's use of South Armagh as a setting enables reflection on who was left behind in the "surge for progress" post-Agreement. Heidemann refers to this as a "forgotten Other" - both the place itself, close to the border with the south of Ireland, and the people there, often working within a precarious economic reality. Spallen's use of monologue in Pumpgirl has been compared to Brian Friel, Mark O'Rowe and Conor McPherson. This use of a form more usually associated with Irish male writers at the time was described by Carole Quigley in her analysis of the play's relationship with toxic masculinity as "subverting the theatrical form in a radically empowering way". This in turn led to comparison to the writers Gillian Greer and Catriona Daly. Lally the Scut has been studied in relation to how humour is used in plays about Northern Ireland. Comparison has been drawn between that work and The History of the Troubles by Martin Lynch and Cyprus Avenue by David Ireland, concluding that of the three Lynch's work is the most playful. Spallen's work has also been analysed in terms of gender and neoliberalism.

== Personal life ==
To supplement her income from writing, as of 2019, Spallen had a jewellery-making business via the Etsy e-commerce platform.

== Awards ==
- Susan Smith Blackburn Prize (2007)
- Stewart Parker Trust New Playwright Bursary (2009)
- Windham-Campbell Literature Prize (2016)

== Selected works ==
- Pumpgirl (2006)
- Strandline (2009)
- Lally the Scut (2015)
