= The Irish... and How They Got That Way =

American Off-Broadway musical

The Irish… and How They Got That Way
- Music: Various
- Lyrics: Various
- Book: Frank McCourt
- Premiere: 1997: Irish Repertory Theatre
- Productions: 1997 Off-Broadway 2000 Off-Broadway revival 2010 Off-Broadway revival

The Irish… and How They Got That Way is an American Off-Broadway musical first performed in 1997 at the Irish Repertory Theatre. Based on a book by Frank McCourt, the play featured an eclectic mix of Irish music ranging from the traditional "Danny Boy" to U2's "I Still Haven't Found What I'm Looking For."

== Development ==
Recognizing a 1990s interval of cultural Hibernophilia, Frank McCourt wrote The Irish… and How They Got That Way, which premiered in 1997 at the Irish Repertory Theatre, where McCourt had previously acted. The play combines primary documents, such as news, letters, photos, paintings, and journals, either in spoken words or in projections upon the backdrops to illustrate the Irish-American struggle over the prior 150 years.

Press notes described it as an "irreverent but affectionate history of the Irish in America that mingles laughter and sentiment in a tapestry of classical songs and stories. The production encapsulates the most tumultuous times of the past century with the vibrant humor and bitter irony that had become the trademark of the author."

The show was revived at the same theatre in 2000, and again in 2010 for the one-year anniversary of McCourt's death on July 19. Previewed from July 14 and scheduled to run from July 22 to September 5, the show was extended through September 26 due to enthusiastic reviews and responses.

== Reception ==
Broadway World summarized the play's reviews:

The Associated Press' Jennifer Farrar called The Irish… and How They Got That Way "pure enjoyment ... an exuberant, mostly Irish cast enacts McCourt's wide-ranging material that sizzles with outrage, wit, pride, and of course, sentiment." For NY1, Time Out's David Cote proclaimed: "The cast of two men and four women put on a spirited, jaunty show by alternating singing, dancing and reciting with fluid ease in Charlotte Moore's brisk, affectionate staging." In his The New York Times review, Andy Webster observed "the buoyant blend of traditional songs, show tunes and pop is delightful." According to Theatermania.com's David Finkle, the revival is "a fitting tribute to everything Irish." In the New Yorker, Trish Deitch wrote "the production, directed by Charlotte Moore, is full of confidence and humor, and with the help of a talented cast, the Irish come out on top." And in her CurtainUp.com review, Elizabeth Ahlfors concluded "all that was missing was a pint of Guinness."

== Cast and credits ==
Notable cast and credits included:

- Frank McCourt, playwright
- Charlotte Moore, director, artistic director
- Rusty Magee, musical director, musical arrangements
- Kevin B. Winebold, musical director, accordion, piano, ensemble
- Irish Repertory Theatre, producer
- Terry Donnelly, ensemble (alto)
- Bob Green, ensemble
- Donna Kane, ensemble
- Ciarán Sheehan, ensemble (tenor)
- Michael Gottlieb, lighting designer
- Shirley Herz Associates, press representative

== Performances ==
| Venue | City | Season |
|---|---|---|
| Irish Repertory Theatre | Chelsea, New York | 1997 |
| Irish Repertory Theatre | Chelsea, New York | 1999 |
| Irish Repertory Theatre | Chelsea, New York | 2000 |
| The Fulton Opera House | Lancaster, Pennsylvania | 2006 |
| Irish Repertory Theatre | Chelsea, New York | 2010 |
| Ivoryton Playhouse | Essex, Connecticut | 2011 |
| Somerville Theatre | Somerville, Massachusetts | 2013 |

== Songs ==
The musical incorporates the following Irish-American music:

- "Danny Boy"
- "Erie Canal"
- "Finnegan's Wake"
- "Galway Bay"
- "The Ghost of Molly McGuire"
- "Has Anybody Here Seen Kelly?"
- "I'll Take You Home Again, Kathleen"
- "I Still Haven't Found What I'm Looking For"
- "Johnny I Hardly Knew Ye"
- "Mother Machree"
- "No Irish Need Apply"
- "Over There"
- "The Rare Old Times"
- "The Rose of Tralee"
- "Shores of Amerikay"
- "Skibbereen"
- "Too-Ra-Loo-Ra-Loo-Ra"
- "Who Threw The Overalls in Mrs. Murphy's Chowder?"
- "You're a Grand Old Flag"

A cast album was released in 1998 by Varèse Sarabande.
