= Poster boy (disambiguation) =

Poster boy or poster child is a male person who represents a cause or ideal.

It may also mean:

- Poster Boy (film), a 2004, gay-themed American film
- Poster Boy (street artist), the pseudonym of a famous graffiti artist active in New York City
- The Poster Boy, a Hungarian indie rock band
- Poster Boys (2017 film), an Indian Hindi-language comedy film
- Poster Boys (2020 film), an Irish comedy-drama film
- Poster Boy, a 2hollis song from the album '2'

== See also ==
- Poster child (disambiguation)
- Poster girl (disambiguation)
