= Kevin B. Winebold =

Kevin Brian Winebold
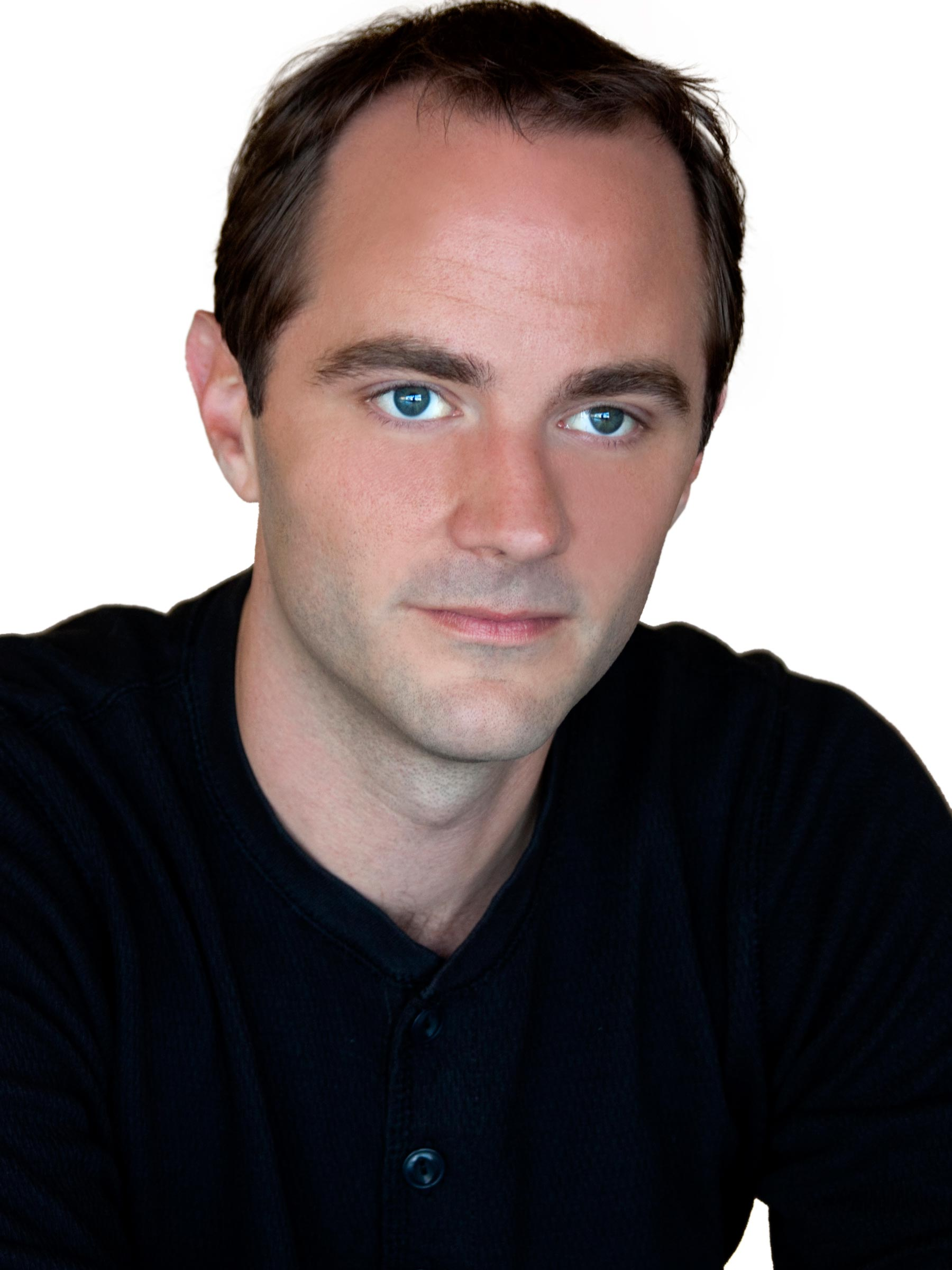
- Kevin B. Winebold
- Born: June 17, 1979 (age 46); Elmira, New York
- Occupations: Music director, actor
- Years active: 2006–present
- Website: kevinbwinebold.com

Kevin B. Winebold (born June 17, 1979) is a New York music director and actor.

Winebold has musically directed productions of Kiss Me, Kate, The Irish… and How They Got That Way, and The Threepenny Opera. Often cast as a piano player, Winebold has starred in the television shows On the Case with Paula Zahn and Celebrity Ghost Stories, and in the films The Letter and Vengeance.

== Early career ==
Kevin Brian Winebold was born June 17, 1979, in Elmira, New York. He graduated from Southside High School in 1997, and then studied at Ithaca College and obtained his bachelor's in theater at Elmira College in 2004. Winebold's senior thesis was on the playwright Terrence McNally, whose play Master Class Winebold later starred in. Native to Pine City, New York, Winebold practiced musical theater in Ireland, Japan, and Korea before returning home.

== Theater ==
In 2006, Winebold was musical director at Lakes Region Summer Theatre. He was nominated for that year's Best Musical Director by the New Hampshire Theatre Awards for his work with Kiss Me, Kate. He later became the rehearsal accompanist and an ensemble member in the Broadway concert of "Camelot" through mutual friendships with the musical director, and was also featured in the Broadway concerts of "Oliver!" (including rehearsal accompaniment), "Something Wonderful", and "Broadway Backwards 8". He is a member of Actors' Equity Association. He became musical director of On the Town at Jean's Playhouse in 2009.

He was selected as musical director for the 2010 revival of The Irish… and How They Got That Way Off-Broadway, restaged to honor the one-year anniversary of playwright Frank McCourt's death on July 19. Winebold both acted in the ensemble and succeeded the late Rusty Magee, the play's musical arranger and previous music director.

Previewed from July 14 and scheduled to run from July 22 to September 5, the show was extended through September 26 due to enthusiastic reviews and responses. Winebold played piano and accordion, and also directed the ensemble, including the use of spoons.

Winebold portrayed street singer and pianist Rusk Greene in the Great Depression retrospective Southern Crossroads at the Totem Pole Playhouse in Fayetteville, Pennsylvania, in August 2011, and was music director for Little Women at Long Island's Secret Theatre in December 2011. He also appeared in Disney's High School Musical at the Inter-Lakes Auditorium in Meredith, New Hampshire, for the Interlakes Summer Theatre, a professional summer stock theatre. He returned to the Interlakes Theatre to direct music there for Always, Patsy Cline, November 19–20, 2011, and reprised the show at the Concord City Auditorium, April 21–22, 2012. As the show's conductor, he led a six-piece live band, and performed his own accompaniment on piano.

At the Off-Broadway Marvell Repertory Theatre in 2012, Winebold served as musical director of The Threepenny Opera, nominated for Outstanding Revival of a Musical by the Drama Desk Awards, a category that included several Broadway productions as well. Winebold also starred as ensemble member Jimmy Jr. in the popular play by Bertolt Brecht and Kurt Weill.

He then portrayed Maria Callas's awe-struck accompanist "Manny", in Master Class by Terrence McNally, at the Musical Theatre of Connecticut in 2013, based on recordings of Callas's select Juilliard classes in 1971 and 1972. Winebold starred in the Off-Broadway protest musical The Bonus Army in September 2013. He has also performed in Off-Broadway's Tin Pan Alley and in Marvell Rep's production of Henry V. He has served as music director for Jim Brochu's one-man show Character Man in 2013 (along with piano accompaniment), for the May 2014 Birthright Israel Alumni Musical Cabaret, and for Warp Speed: a Sci Fi Parody Musical for the Midtown International Theatre Festival, August 1–10, 2014.

== Film and television ==
Winebold starred in "The Final Act", an episode of Investigation Discovery's documentary Fatal Encounters portraying Charles Yukl, a musical director and piano bar player, regarded as a sociopath. It was broadcast in January 2014.

Winebold specializes in portraying serial killers and has had several such true crime reenactment roles for the same network. For the eighth season of On the Case with Paula Zahn in 2013, he starred as Chris Lang in "Nine Days of Terror" and Gerald Powers in "A Fateful Decision". His other appearances include the shows Celebrity Ghost Stories and Funny or Die Presents, as well as TV commercials for Canon Inc. and other brands.

He starred in Oded Naaman's thesis film When Sunny Gets Blue in 2013, a jazz pianist's "quirky journey with odd characters" created for the 26th Columbia University Film Festival. He portrayed Sam in Karen Goldfarb's Casablanca parody short, Here's Lookin' at You, Kid, which world-premiered at the 2014 Cannes Film Festival. He also had roles in the films The Letter, with Winona Ryder (2012), and Vengeance (2013).

== Music ==
As a member of Essential Voices USA Winebold performed at six concerts at Carnegie Hall, and at NBC's Rockefeller Center Christmas Tree Lighting, and was accompanist for the 2011 First Presbyterian Church at Throggs Neck Christmas concert. He was the associate conductor for the national tours of "The Wedding Singer" and "Footloose", and conductor for the tour of "All Shook Up".

He is a member of Associated Musicians of Greater New York (American Federation of Musicians Local 802). His weekly column "The Audition Playlist" (2012–2013) for Theatre Music Directors, advising singers on audition selections and etiquette, was cited as a resource for such wisdom by the U.K.-accredited VIDLA (Vocalist International Distance Learning Academy). He is also an administrative assistant with the New York Pops.

In addition to acting and musical direction, Winebold currently serves as accompanist and vocal coach in New York City, and aspires to play in a Broadway orchestra pit. He is also a tap dancer with Julie Rubin's Ya'el Tap Dance Company.

== Reception ==
Winebold's direction of The Irish… and How They Got That Way was reviewed positively as providing "comic flair" during "No Irish Need Apply" and "a rich tapestry of song and speech". Reviewer David Finkle stated that "the revered ditties are robustly accompanied by music director Kevin B. Winebold." The Irish Examiner said, "It's just brilliant and it never stops for a minute. The music and the singing is superb and well done."

Simon Saltzman stated that Winebold musically directed "the best The Threepenny Opera I've seen ever .... It was Bertolt Brecht's birthday. What a treat to have the score played so expertly and with such gusto by seven superb musicians. In addition, and not incidentally, it was wonderful to hear so much excellent singing without electronic enhancement."
