= Poster girl =

Poster girl may refer to:

- Poster girl, a female poster child, a prototypical or quintessential example of something
- Poster girl, a model used on posters for her looks
  - Pin-up girl
- Poster Girl (film), a 2010 documentary film
- Poshter Girl, a 2016 Indian Marathi-language film by Sameer Patil
- "Poster Girl", the sixth track on the Backstreet Boys' album Never Gone
- "Poster Girl (Wrong Side of the World)", a song written and performed by Beccy Cole
- Poster Girl (album), a 2021 album by Zara Larsson

== See also ==
- Poster child (disambiguation)
- Poster boy (disambiguation)
