= Geoffrey Evans and John Shaw =

English murderers

Geoffrey Evans
- Born: 12 June 1943; Lancashire, England, United Kingdom
- Died: 20 May 2012 (aged 68); Dublin, Ireland
- Conviction: Murder
- Penalty: Life imprisonment

Details
- Victims: At least 2
- Span of crimes: August – September 1976
- Country: Ireland
- Date apprehended: 26 September 1976

Geoffrey Evans (12 June 1943 – 20 May 2012) and John Shaw (born 6 July 1945) were English murderers who murdered two women in Ireland in 1976. They planned to rape and kill one woman each week. Soon arrested, they became two of the longest-serving prisoners in Ireland.

== Crimes in the United Kingdom ==
Police had previously investigated the pair in connection with three rapes committed in England in 1974, prompting the men to leave the United Kingdom and travel to the Republic of Ireland, thus escaping British prosecution for the rape charges.

== Crimes in Ireland ==
In Ireland they planned a series of murders and rapes, which they did by house theft. They were detained in Cork, charged with burglary and received a two-year prison sentence. After 18 months they were released.

In August 1976, in County Wicklow, they abducted and repeatedly raped and then murdered 23 year-old Elizabeth Plunkett from Ringsend in Dublin, following a night out in Brittas Bay. They disposed of her body by tying it to a lawnmower and dumping it in the Irish Sea off the Wicklow coast. Her remains were discovered on 28 September 1976. over 110 km (59 nmi) away on Duncormick beach, Co Wexford.

In September of that year, in Castlebar, they abducted 23-year-old Mary Duffy as she walked home from a late work shift as a cook. The pair drove her to a secluded area in Connemara and over a two-day period repeatedly beat and raped her, before they murdered her. The pair then disposed of her body by tying a concrete block and a sledgehammer to it and dumping it in Lough Inagh in County Galway. On 26 September 1976, both were detained by the Garda Síochána (police).

== Trials ==
Since each man blamed the other for both murders, the Circuit Court judge ordered separate trials for each accused and victim, making four trials in all at the Central Criminal Court. First, in 1977, Shaw was tried for rape and murder of Duffy, and convicted on a retrial after the initial jury was hung. Then Evans was tried for both murders, after the Director of Public Prosecutions (DPP) appealed the original order for separate trials per victim. Evans was found guilty of the rape and murder of Duffy and the rape of Plunkett, but the judge directed the jury to find him not guilty of murdering Plunkett. In 1979, the DPP entered a nolle prosequi for the charges against Shaw in relation to Plunkett. A consequence not publicised at the time was that nobody was found guilty of murdering Plunkett.

== Post conviction ==
=== Evans ===
In December 2008, Evans underwent heart surgery, suffered a stroke and fell into a coma. Until June 2010 he remained in hospital care with caution, and then was given temporary release when doctors said he was in a vegetative state. In April 2011 he was transferred to St Mary's Hospital, Dublin. He died there on 20 May 2012 at the age of 71 or 72 (sources vary). According to the postmortem, the cause of death was sepsis caused by pneumonia.

=== Shaw ===
As of July 2026, Shaw is still imprisoned for his part in the murder of Mary Duffy, having been moved from Arbour Hill Prison in Dublin to Castlerea Prison in Co Roscommon in 2022. Having served over 50 years he is currently the longest serving prisoner in Ireland.

=== Elizabeth Plunkett ===
In 2023, relatives of Elizabeth Plunkett were notified by the Irish Parole Board that Shaw was due for temporary day release. After further legal inquiries, the family subsequently discovered that they had no right to object to his release, because Shaw had not been convicted of any crime against her. They further discovered that no inquest had been held or death certificate issued for Elizabeth. In January 2025 a District Court jury in Gorey returned a verdict of unlawful killing, with coroner recording a cause of death as asphyxia due to strangulation. Her family called on Drew Harris, the Garda Commissioner, to reopen the murder investigation. A May 2025 RTÉ Doc on One podcast series "Stolen Sister" examined the case.
