= Poster child (disambiguation) =

Poster child is a person who represents a cause or ideal.

It may also mean:

- Posterchild (street artist), a Toronto street artist
- "Poster Child" (song), a Red Hot Chili Peppers song
- "Poster Child" (Vera), a 2013 television episode

== See also ==
- Poster boy (disambiguation)
- Poster girl (disambiguation)
