= Irish Repertory Theatre =

Off-Broadway theatre company

Coordinates: 40°44′33.7″N 73°59′41″W

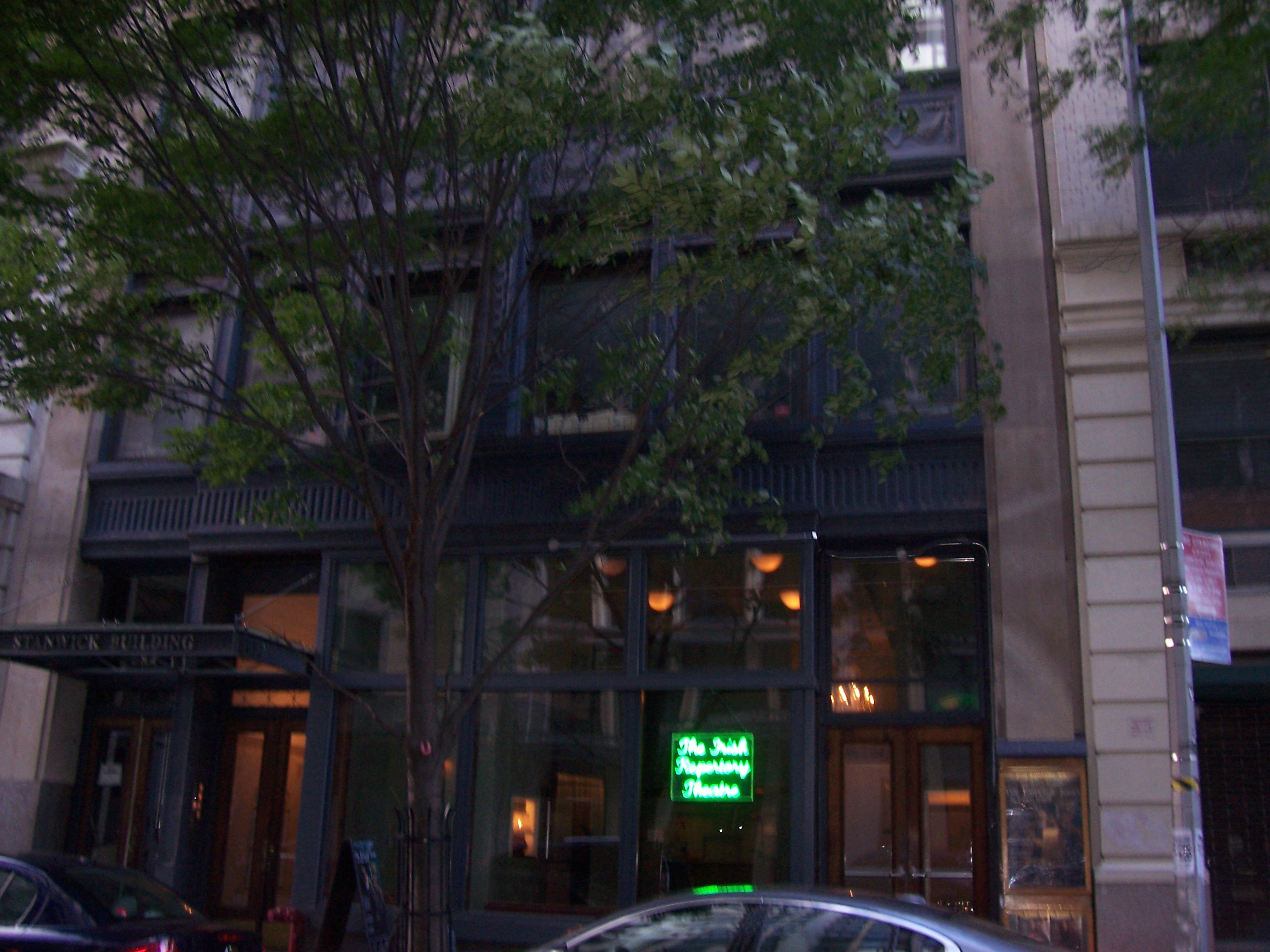
- Address: 132 W 22nd St, New York, NY 10011
- Owner: Ciarán O'Reilly and Charlotte Moore

Construction
- Opened: September 1988

The Irish Repertory Theatre is an off-Broadway theatre company founded in 1988.

== History ==
The Irish Repertory Theatre was founded by Ciarán O'Reilly and Charlotte Moore, opening in September 1988 with Sean O'Casey's The Plough and the Stars.

In 1995, the company moved to its permanent home in Chelsea on three completely renovated floors of a former warehouse, allowing for both a Main Stage theatre and a smaller studio space, the W. Scott McLucas Studio. The Irish Repertory Theatre is the only year-round theatre company in New York City devoted to bringing Irish and Irish American works to the stage.

The theater has been recognized with a 2007 Jujamcyn Award, a special Drama Desk Award for "Excellence in Presenting Distinguished Irish drama," and the Lucille Lortel Award for "Outstanding Body of Work". Its productions draw more than 35,000 audience members annually.

Irish American Writers & Artists Inc. honored the theatre with the Eugene O'Neill Lifetime Achievement Award in 2011.

In 2014, The Irish Repertory Theatre started a renovation of their home in Chelsea. For the 2014–15 season, Irish Rep's performances were held at the DR2 Theater near Union Square.

During the holiday seasons of 2016 and 2017, the American Irish Historical Society headquarters on Fifth Avenue was home to the Irish Repertory Theatre's production of The Dead, 1904. The show was an adaptation of James Joyce's short story "The Dead", adapted by novelist Jean Hanff Korelitz and her husband, Irish poet Paul Muldoon. For The Dead, 1904, the building had 57 guests at a time, who for part of the performance joined the cast for a holiday feast drawn from the original novella.

In 2017, the company received an Obie Grant from the Obie Awards presented by the American Theatre Wing and The Village Voice.

== Season history ==
2023

- Endgame by Samuel Beckett

2021–2022 Season

- Bikeman by Tom Flynn, Produced by Robert Cuccioli, in honor of the 20th Anniversary of the 9/11 terrorist attacks, An Immersive Audio Event
- Angela's Ashes: The Musical, Produced by Pat Moylan, Music and Lyrics by Adam Howell, Book by Paul Hurt, Based on the book by Frank McCourt
- Autumn Royal by Kevin Barry
- A Girl is a Half-formed Thing by Eimear McBride, Adapted by Annie Ryan
- The Streets of New York written by Dion Boucicault, directed by Charlotte Moore
- Made By God by Ciara Ní Chuirc, directed by Olivia Songer
- A Touch of the Poet by Eugene O'Neill, directed by Ciarán O'Reilly
- Two By Synge by JM Synge, directed by Charlotte Moore

2020–2021 Season

- Irish Rep Online
  - Digital Fall Season
    - Belfast Blues written and performed by Geraldine Hughes, A Performance on Screen
    - Give Me Your Hand A Poetical Stroll through The National Gallery of London, Poems by Paul Durcan, A Performance on Screen
    - A Touch of the Poet by Eugene O'Neill, A Performance on Screen
    - On Beckett/In Screen conceived and performed by Bill Irwin, A Performance on Screen
    - Meet Me in St. Louis, Book by Hugh Wheeler, Songs by Hugh Martin & Ralph Blane, Adapted & Directed by Charlotte Moore, A Holiday Special in Song and on Screen
  - The Aran Islands by J.M. Synge, adapted & directed by Joe O'Byrne
  - John Cullum: An Accidental Star, Conceived by John Cullum and Jeff Berger, Written by David Thompson, in association Vineyard Theatre and Goodspeed Musicals with Jeff Berger, Directed by Lonny Price and Matt Cowart
  - Little Gem by Elaine Murphy
  - The Man Who Wanted to Fly, directed by Frank Shouldice, A NY Film Premiere starring Bobby Coote
- Digital Summer Season
  - Ghosting by Jamie Beamish and Anne O'Riordan, A Theatre Royal, Waterford & Throwin Shapes Production, A Performance on Screen
  - The Cordelia Dream by Marina Carr, A Performance on Screen

2019–2020 Season

- Kingfishers Catch Fire by Robin Glendinning
- Dublin Carol by Conor McPherson
- Pumpgirl by Abbie Spallen
- The Scourge by Michelle Dooley Mahon, in association with Wexford Arts Centre
- London Assurance by Dion Boucicault
- Lady G: Plays and Whisperings of Lady Gregory by Lady Augusta Gregory, additional material by Ciarán O'Reilly
- Incantata by Paul Muldoon, in association with Galway International Arts Festival and Jen Coppinger Productions
- Irish Rep Online
  - Summer Online Season
    - Molly Sweeney by Brian Friel, A Performance on Screen
    - The Gifts You Gave to the Dark by Darren Murphy
    - YES! Reflections of Molly Bloom From the novel Ulysses by James Joyce, Adapted for stage by Aedín Moloney & Colum McCann, A Performance on Screen
    - The Weir by Conor McPherson, A Performance on Screen
    - Love, Noël written and devised by Barry Day, A Performance on Screen
- Postponed Due to COVID-19
  - The Smuggler by Ronán Noone
  - A Touch of the Poet by Eugene O'Neill

2018–2019 Season

- Wild Abandon by Leenya Rideout
- On Beckett conceived and performed by Bill Irwin with writings by Samuel Beckett
- Two by Friel by Brian Friel
- A Child's Christmas in Wales by Dylan Thomas, adapted and directed by Charlotte Moore
- The Dead, 1904 based on the short story by James Joyce, adapted by Paul Muldoon & Jean Hanff Korelitz
- The Seán O'Casey Season
  - The Shadow of a Gunman by Seán O'Casey
  - Juno and the Paycock by Seán O'Casey
  - The Plough and the Stars by Seán O'Casey
- YES! Reflections of Molly Bloom From the novel Ulysses by James Joyce, Adapted for stage by Aedín Moloney & Colum McCann
- Love, Noël written and devised by Barry Day
- Little Gem by Elaine Murphy

2017–2018 Season

- The Home Place by Brian Friel
- Off the Meter, On the Record by John McDonagh
- It's A Wonderful Life by Anthony Palermo
- The Dead, 1904 based on the short story by James Joyce, adapted by Paul Muldoon & Jean Hanff Korelitz
- Jimmy Titanic by Bernard McMullan
- Disco Pigs by Enda Walsh
- Three Small Irish Masterpieces by W. B. Yeats, Lady Gregory, and John Millington Synge
- The Seafarer by Conor McPherson
- Woman and Scarecrow by Marina Carr
- On A Clear Day You Can See Forever by Alan Jay Lerner

2016–2017 Season

- Afterplay by Brian Friel
- Finian's Rainbow music by Burton Lane, book by E.Y. Harburg & Fred Saidy, lyrics by E.Y. Harburg
- The Pigeon in The Taj Mahal by Laoisa Sexton
- The Dead, 1904 based on the short story by James Joyce, adapted by Paul Muldoon & Jean Hanff Korelitz
- Crackskull Row by Honor Molloy
- The Emperor Jones by Eugene O'Neill
- Rebel in the Soul by Larry Kirwan
- Woody Sez: The Life & Music of Woody Guthrie devised by David M. Lutken with Nick Corley and Darcie Deaville, Helen Jean Russell & Andy Teirstein
- The Aran Islands by J.M. Synge, adapted & directed by Joe O'Byrne

2015–2016 Season

- The Quare Land by John McManus
- A Child's Christmas in Wales by Dylan Thomas
- The Burial At Thebes by Seamus Heaney
- A Celebration of Harold Pinter with Julian Sands
- Shining City by Conor McPherson
- Quietly by Owen McCafferty

2014–2015 Season

- Port Authority by Conor McPherson
- A Christmas Memory by Truman Capote, adapted by Larry Grossman and Carol Hall
- Da by Hugh Leonard
- The Belle of Belfast by Nate Rufus Edelman
- The Weir by Conor McPherson

2013–2014 Season

- Juno and the Paycock by Seán O'Casey
- A Mind-Bending Evening of Beckett by Samuel Beckett
- It's a Wonderful Life adapted by Anthony E. Palermo
- Transport book by Thomas Keneally, music and lyrics by Larry Kirwan
- Sea Marks by Gardner McKay

2012 – 2013

- The Freedom of the City by Brian Friel
- It's a Wonderful Life adapted by Anthony E. Palermo
- A Celebration of Harold Pinter starring Julian Sands, directed by John Malkovich
- The Songs I Love So Well starring Phil Coulter
- Airswimming by Charlotte Jones
- Donnybrook! book by Robert E. McEnroe; music and lyrics by Johnny Burke
- For Love by Laoisa Sexton
- Who's Your Daddy? by Johnny O'Callaghan
- The Weir by Conor McPherson
- Gibraltar by Patrick Fitzgerald

2011 – 2012

- Weep for the Virgins by Nellise Child
- Noctu conceived and directed by Breandán de Gallaí
- Dancing at Lughnasa by Brian Friel
- Beyond the Horizon by Eugene O'Neill
- Give Me Your Hand by Paul Duncan
- Man and Superman by George Bernard Shaw
- New Girl in Town book by George Abbott, music and lyrics by Bob Merrill

2010 – 2011

- Banished Children of Eve by Kelly Younger, adapted from the novel by Peter Quinn
- St. Nicholas by Conor McPherson
- A Child's Christmas in Wales by Dylan Thomas
- Molly Sweeney by Brian Friel
- My Scandalous Life by Thomas Kilroy
- The Shaughraun by Dion Boucicault

2009–2010

- The Emperor Jones by Eugene O'Neill
- Ernest in Love by Oscar Wilde
- Candida by George Bernard Shaw
- White Woman Street by Sebastian Barry
- The Irish ... and How They Got That Way by Frank McCourt

2008–2009

- After Luke & When I Was God by Cónal Creedon
- The Yeats Project by W. B. Yeats
- Aristocrats by Brian Friel
- A Child's Christmas in Wales based on the story by Dylan Thomas
- The Master Builder by Henrik Ibsen adapted by Frank McGuinness
- Confessions of an Irish Publican from the writings of John B. Keane, adapted by Des Keogh

2007–2008

- Around the World in 80 Days by Mark Brown, based on the novel by Jules Verne
- Prisoner of the Crown by Richard Stockton, Additional Material and Original Concept by Richard T. Herd
- Take Me Along, Book by Joseph Stein and Bob Russell, Lyrics and Music by Bob Merrill
- A Child's Christmas in Wales by Dylan Thomas
- The Devil's Disciple by George Bernard Shaw
- Sive by John B. Keane

2006–2007

- Tom Crean – Antarctic Explorer by Aidan Dooley
- Gaslight by Patrick Hamilton
- Defender of the Faith by Stuart Carolan
- Meet Me in St. Louis, Book by Hugh Wheeler, Songs by Hugh Martin and Ralph Blane
- Irish One Acts: Great White American Teeth by Fiona Walsh and Swansong by Conor McDermottroe
- The Hairy Ape by Eugene O'Neill

2005–2006

- Mr. Dooley's America by Philip Dunne and Martin Blaine
- The Field by John B. Keane
- You Don't have to be Irish by Malacy McCourt
- George M. Cohan, Tonight! by Chip Deffaa and George M. Cohan
- The Bells of Christmas conceived by Ciarán O'Reilly
- Mrs. Warren's Profession by George Bernard Shaw
- Beowulf adaptation and lyrics by Lindsey Turner, music and lyrics by Lenny Pickett

2004–2005

- Philadelphia, Here I Come! by Brian Friel
- She Stoops to Conquer by Oliver Goldsmith
- Endgame by Samuel Beckett
- After the Ball by Noël Coward

2003–2004

- Triptych by Enda O'Brien
- The Colleen Bawn by Dion Boucicault
- Christmas With Tommy Makem by Tommy Makem
- Eden by Eugene O'Brien
- Finian's Rainbow by E.Y. Harburg, Burton Lane and Fred Saidy, adapted by Charlotte Moore
- Let's Put On A Show! with Jan and Mickey Rooney

2002–2003

- Bailegangaire by Tom Murphy
- A Celtic Christmas arranged by Charlotte Moore
- Bedbound by Edna Walsh
- The Love-Hungry Farmer by John B. Keane and adapted for the stage by Des Keogh
- Foley by Michael West
- Peg O' My Heart by J. Hartley Manners, songs by Charlotte Moore

2001–2002

- Save It for the Stage: The Life of Reilly by Charles Nelson Reilly and Paul Linke
- The Streets of New York by Dion Boucicault, adaptation and songs by Charlotte Moore
- That and the Cup of Tea by Carmel Quinn and Sean Fuller
- A Child's Christmas in Wales by Dylan Thomas
- The Matchmaker by John B. Keane and adapted for the stage by Phyllis Ryan
- An Evening in New York with W.B. Yeats and John Quinn, adapted by Neil Bradley and Paul Kerry
- Pigtown by Mike Finn
- The Playboy of the Western World by J.M. Synge

2000–2001

- The Hostage by Brendan Behan
- A Child's Christmas in Wales by Dylan Thomas
- The Importance of Being Oscar by Micheál MacLiammóir
- The Picture of Dorian Gray by Oscar Wilde and adapted for the stage by Joe O'Byrne
- A Life by Hugh Leonard
- The Irish ... and How They Got That Way by Frank McCourt

1999–2000

- Invasions and Legacies by Tommy Makem
- Eclipsed by Patricia Burke Brogan
- The Irish ... and How They Got That Way by Frank McCourt
- The Country Boy by John Murphy
- Our Lady of Sligo by Sebastian Barry [view photo gallery]
- Don Juan in Hell by George Bernard Shaw

1998–1999

- The Shaughraun by Dion Boucicault
- Krapp's Last Tape by Samuel Beckett
- A Child's Christmas in Wales by Dylan Thomas
- Oh, Coward! by Roderick Cook
- The Happy Prince by Oscar Wilde
- The Shadow of a Gunman by Seán O'Casey
- Dear Liar by Jerome Kilty

1997–1998

- The Irish ... and How They Got That Way by Frank McCourt
- Major Barbara by George Bernard Shaw [view photo gallery]
- Rafferty Rescues the Moon by June Anderson
- Song at Sunset conceived by Shivaun O'Casey
- Long Day's Journey into Night by Eugene O'Neill

1996–1997

- The Importance of Being Earnest by Oscar Wilde [view photo gallery]
- A Child's Christmas in Wales by Dylan Thomas
- My Astonishing Self by Donal Donnelly
- The Yeats Plays by William Butler Yeats
- The Plough and The Stars by Seán O'Casey [view photo gallery]
- The Nightingale and Not The Lark and The Invisible Man by Jennifer Johnston
- Mass Appeal by Bill C. Davis
- Wait 'til I Tell You by Carmel Quinn

1995–1996

- Same Old Moon by Geraldine Aron
- Juno and the Paycock by Seán O'Casey
- Shimmer by John O'Keefe
- Frank Pig Says Hello by Pat McCabe
- A Whistle in the Dark by Tom Murphy
- Da by Hugh Leonard

1994–1995

- The Au Pair Man by Hugh Leonard
- The Hasty Heart by John Patrick
- Mother of All the Behans by Peter Sheridan
- Alive, Alive, Oh by Milo O'Shea and Kitty Sullivan

1992–1993

- The Madame MacAdam Travelling Theatre by Tom Kilroy
- Joyicity by Ulick O'Connor
- Frankly Brendan by Frank O'Connor and Brendan Behan
- Seconds Out by Young Irish Playwrights

1991–1992

- Grandchild of Kings by Harold Prince [view photo gallery]

1990=1991

- The Playboy of the Western World by J.M. Synge
- Making History by Brian Friel

1989–1990

- Sea Marks by Gardiner McKay
- English That For Me by Eamon Kelly
- A Whistle in the Dark by Tom Murphy
- Endwords by Chris O'Neill
- Philadelphia, Here I Come! by Brian Friel

1988–1989

- The Plough and The Stars by Seán O'Casey
- I Do Not Like Thee, Dr. Fell by Bernard Farrell
- Yeats! A Celebration by William Butler Yeats
- A Whistle in the Dark by Tom Murphy

== Awards ==
1992

- Drama Desk Award, "Excellence in Presenting Distinguished Irish Drama"
- Clarence Derwent Award, Patrick Fitzgerald, Grandchild of Kings
- Outer Critics Circle Nom., "Best Director" – Hal Prince, Grandchild of Kings
- Outer Critics Circle Nom., "Best Actress" – Pauline Flanagan, Grandchild of Kings
- Outer Critics Circle Nom., "Best Scenic Design" – Eugene Lee, Grandchild of Kings

1996

- Drama Desk Nom., "Best Actress" – Melissa Errico, The Importance of Being Earnest

1997

- Drama League Nom., "Best Actress" – Melissa Errico, Major Barbara

1998

- The Irish American Heritage and Culture Week Committee of New York City, Board of Education, "Irish Organization of the *Year Award"
- Obie Award, "Best Actor" – Daniel Gerroll, The Shaughraun
- Obie Award, "Best Actor" – Brian Murray, Long Day's Journey Into Night
- Drama Desk Nom., "Best Actress in a Play" – Frances Sternhagen, Long Day's Journey Into Night

1999

- Outer Critics Circle Nom., "Best Actress" – Marion Seldes, Dear Liar

2000

- Drama Desk Nom., "Best Actress" – Sinead Cusack, Our Lady of Sligo
- Outer Critic Nom., "Best Actress" – Sinead Cusack, Our Lady of Sligo
- Drama Desk Nom., "Best Actor" – Fritz Weaver, A Life

2002

- Outer Critics Circle Nom., "Outstanding Solo Performance" – Charles Nelson Reilly, Save it for the Stage: The Life of Reilly
- Outer Critics Circle Nom., "Outstanding Off-Broadway Play" – The Matchmaker
- Hewes Design Award, "Noteworthy Special Effects" – James Morgan, Pigtown
- Drama League Nom., "Distinguished Production of a Musical" – The Streets of New York
- Drama League Nom., "Best Actress in a Musical" – Kristin Maloney, The Streets of New York

2004

- Drama Desk Nom., "Outstanding Revival of a Play" – The Colleen Bawn
- Drama Desk Nom., "Outstanding Revival of a Musical" – Finian's Rainbow
- Drama League Nom., "Distinguished Revival of a Musical" – Finian's Rainbow
- Drama League Nom., "Best Actress in a Play" – Catherine Byrne, Eden
- Drama League Nom., "Best Actress in a Musical" – Melissa Errico, Finian's Rainbow
- Drama League Nom., "Best Actor in a Musical" – Malcolm Gets, Finian's Rainbow
- Joe A. Callaway Award Nom., "Best Director" – Charlotte Moore, Finian's Rainbow
- Edinburgh Theatre Festival Award, "Best Play" – The Love Hungry Farmer
- Edinburgh Theatre Festival Award, "Best Actor" – Des Keogh, The Love Hungry Farmer

2005

- Lucille Lortel Award, "Outstanding Body of Work"
- Lucille Lortel Nom., "Best Revival" – Finian's Rainbow
- Lucille Lortel Nom., "Best Choreography" – Barry McNabb, Finian's Rainbow
- Drama League Nom., "Best Actor" – Alvin Epstein, Endgame

2006

- Obie Award, "Best Actress" – Dana Ivey, Mrs. Warren's Profession
- Drama Desk Nom., "Solo Performance" – Jon Peterson, George M. Cohan, Tonight!
- Drama Desk Nom., "Outstanding Revival" – Philadelphia, Here I Come!
- Lucille Lortel Nom., "Best Revival" – Mrs. Warren's Profession
- Lucille Lortel Nom., "Outstanding Featured Actress" – Helena Carroll, Philadelphia, Here I Come!
- Drama League Nom. – Dana Ivey, Mrs. Warren's Profession
- Drama League Nom. – Jon Peterson, George M. Cohan, Tonight!

2007

- The 2007 Jujamcyn Theaters Award
- Joe A. Callaway Award Nom., "Best Director" – Ciarán O'Reilly, The Hairy Ape
- Lucille Lortel Nom., "Outstanding Scenic Design" – Eugene Lee, The Hairy Ape
- Drama Desk Nom., "Outstanding Actress in a Play" – Orlagh Cassidy, The Field
- Drama Desk Nom., "Outstanding Revival of a Play" – The Hairy Ape
- Drama Desk Nom., "Outstanding Director of a Play" – Ciarán O'Reilly, The Hairy Ape
- Drama League Nom., "Distinguished Revival of a Play "- The Hairy Ape
- Drama League Nom., "Distinguished Performance Award" – Gregory Derelian and Gerald Finnegan, The Hairy Ape

2008

- Lucille Lortel Nom., "Best Actor" – Brian Murray, Gaslight
- Drama Desk Nom., "Outstanding Revival of a Musical" – Take Me Along
- Drama League Nom., "Distinguished Revival of a Play" – Gaslight
- Drama League Nom., "Distinguished Performance Award" – David Staller, Gaslight
- Outer Critics Award, "Outstanding Revival of a Musical" – Take Me Along
- St. Patrick's Committee in Holyoke, "John F. Kennedy National Award" – Charlotte Moore and Ciarán O'Reilly
- Irish America, "50 Most Influential Women" – Charlotte Moore

2010

- Joe A. Callaway Award, "Best Director" – Ciarán O'Reilly, The Emperor Jones
- The O'Neill Credo Award – Ciarán O'Reilly, The Emperor Jones
- Joe A. Callaway Award, "Best Performance" – John Douglas Thompson, The Emperor Jones
- Lucille Lortel Nom., "Outstanding Revival" – The Emperor Jones
- Lucille Lortel Nom., "Outstanding Lead Actor" – John Douglas Thompson, The Emperor Jones
- Lucille Lortel Nom., "Outstanding Sound Design" – Ryan Rumery and Christian Frederickson, The Emperor Jones
- Drama League Nom., "Distinguished Production of a Play" – The Emperor Jones
- Drama League Nom., "Distinguished Performance Award" – John Douglas Thompson, The Emperor Jones
- Drama Desk Nom., "Outstanding Actor in a Play" – John Douglas Thompson, The Emperor Jones
- Drama Desk Nom., "Outstanding Costume Design" – Antonia Ford-Roberts and Bob Flanagan, The Emperor Jones
- Hewes Design Award Nom., "Scenic Design" – Charlie Corcoran, The Emperor Jones
- 6 AUDELCO Award Nominations, including "Best Revival" – The Emperor Jones
- Lucille Lortel Nom., "Outstanding Revival" – Candida
- Drama Desk Nom., "Outstanding Actress in a Play" – Melissa Errico, Candida
- Drama Desk Nom., "Outstanding Featured Actress in a Play" – Xanthe Elbrick, Candida
- Hewes Design Award Nom., "Lighting Design" – Clifton Taylor, White Woman Street
- Irish America, "50 Most Influential Women" – Charlotte Moore

2011

- The 2011 Eugene O'Neill Lifetime Achievement Award

2012

- Off-Broadway Alliance Nomination, "Best Revival", Beyond the Horizon
- Drama Desk Nom., "Unique Theatrical Experience", Give Me Your Hand
- Joe A. Callaway Award Nomination, "Best Director", Charlotte Moore, Dancing at Lughnasa
- Drama Desk Nom., "Unique Theatrical Experience", NOCTU
- Drama Desk Nom., "Best Choreographer", Brendán de Gallai, NOCTU

2013

- Lucille Lortel Nom., "Outstanding Revival" – The Weir
- Joe A. Callaway Award, "Best Actress" J. Smith Cameron, Juno and the Paycock
- Joe A. Callaway Award Nomination, "Best Director" Ciarán O'Reilly, The Weir
- Outer Critics Circle Special Achievement Award ― Charlotte Moore and Ciarán O'Reilly in recognition of 25 years of producing outstanding theater.
- Drama Desk Award Nomination, "Outstanding Actress in a Musical", Jenny Powers, Donnybrook!
- Drama Desk Award Nomination, "Outstanding Solo Performance", Julian Sands, A Celebration of Harold Pinter

2014

- Outer Critics Circle Nom., "Outstanding New Off-Broadway Musical" – A Christmas Memory
- Winner, 1st Irish Festival, "Outstanding Production" – Port Authority & "Best Actor" Peter Maloney

2015

- Winner, 1st Irish Festival, "Best Playwright" – John McManus, The Quare Land
- Winner, 1st Irish Festival, "Best Director", Ciarán O'Reilly, The Quare Land
- Winner, 1st Irish Festival, "Best Design" The Quare Land
- 1st Irish Festival Special Jury Prize, Peter Maloney, for his performance in The Quare Land

2016

- Irish America, "50 Most Influential Women" – Charlotte Moore

2017

- Obie Award, "Outstanding Performance" to Matthew Broderick for Shining City
- Obie Award, "Excellence in Sound Design" to Ryan Rumery for The Emperor Jones
- Drama Desk Nomination, "Outstanding Fight Choreography", Donal O'Farrell for Quietly
- Off-Broadway Alliance "Legend of the Theatre", Charlotte Moore
- Off-Broadway Alliance Award nomination, "Best Play Revival", The Emperor Jones
- 2017 Chita Rivera Award, "Outstanding Female Dancer in an Off-Broadway Show" for Finian's Rainbow, Lyrica Woodruff
- Off-Broadway Alliance Award nomination, "Best Musical Revival", Finian's Rainbow
- Outer Critics Circle Nomination, "Best Revival of a Musical (Broadway or Off-Broadway)," Finian's Rainbow

2018

- Off Broadway Alliance Awards Nomination, "Best New Musical" for Woody Sez
- Outer Critics Circle Awards Nomination, "Outstanding New Off-Broadway Musical" for Woody Sez
- Outer Critics Circle Awards Nomination, "Outstanding Actor in a Musical" for David M. Lutken, Woody Sez
- Chita Rivera Awards Nomination, Colin Campbell for Disco Pigs
- 1st Irish Festival Special Jury Prize, Colin Campbell, for his performance in Disco Pigs
