= Kieran Patrick Kelly =

Irish murderer (1930–2001)

Kieran Kelly
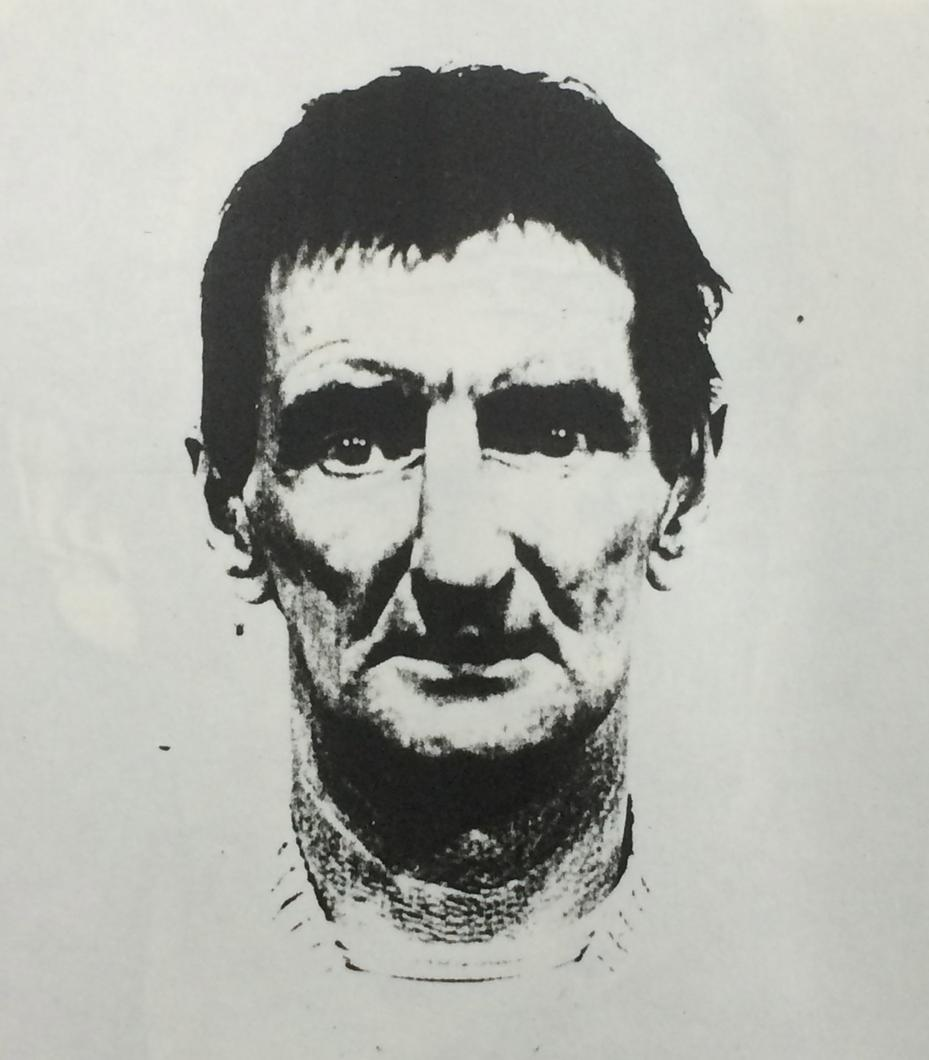
- Born: Kieran Patrick Kelly; 16 March 1930; Rathdowney, County Laois, Ireland
- Died: 2001 (aged 71); HM Prison Frankland, Durham, United Kingdom
- Criminal charges: Murder; Manslaughter
- Criminal penalty: Life Imprisonment

Kieran Patrick Kelly (16 March 1930 – 2001) was an Irish vagrant, convicted murderer, and suspected serial killer.

== Personal life ==
Kelly was born in 1930 in the small town of Rathdowney, County Laois. He and his family moved to Dublin in the early 1940s, where Kelly became involved in petty crime. Slight in build, his large nose led to his being known by many people as "Nosy Kelly".

At the age of 18, Kelly enlisted in the British Army but was dishonorably discharged in 1951 for going AWOL. He moved back and forth between Dublin and London for a number of years before settling in London permanently in about 1960. There he got married, had a number of children, and worked in the construction industry. Before the break-up of his marriage, his growing alcoholism led to him becoming homeless. He then had mental health issues and spent time in Broadmoor Hospital.

== Murders ==
Kelly was arrested for petty theft in 1983. While in a police holding cell, he attacked another homeless man, William Boyd, and strangled him to death.

In a subsequent series of taped confessions to London police, Kelly claimed to have murdered or attempted to murder dozens of people in London using a variety of methods, from pushing people in front of trains to setting them on fire, and to poisoning them over a period of some thirty years. If Kelly's confessions were true, he would have been one of the most prolific serial killers ever active in the United Kingdom, and one of the few known or claimed Irish serial killers.

== Trial and imprisonment ==
In June 1984, Kelly was convicted of the 1983 manslaughter of William Boyd, and the murder of another homeless man in 1975, Hector Fisher. He was sentenced to life imprisonment. Kelly died in 2001 in HMP Frankland, Durham.

== Controversy ==
In 2015, a former London police detective called Geoff Platt to publish a book about Kelly called The London Underground Serial Killer, which claimed that Kelly had murdered around 31 people, and which alleged that the British Home Office had conspired to cover up Kelly's crimes to avoid a public panic. These accusations led to then Metropolitan Chief of Police, Sir Bernard Hogan Howe, to promise to undertake an investigation into the claims.

However, in 2019 Irish journalist Robert Mulhern published another book about Kelly, The Secret Serial Killer: The True Story of Kieran Kelly, which raised serious questions about the veracity of Platt's book and the number of murders which could feasibly be linked to Kelly. Based on his research, Mulhern believes Kelly probably killed five or six people.

In 2020, Irish broadcaster RTÉ released what ultimately became an eight-part Doc on One podcast documentary series, The Nobody Zone, which explored Kelly's life and attempted to ascertain the truth behind his claims. A two-episode docudrama based on the podcast was produced in November 2023 for RTÉ Television.
