= Mary Immaculate Hospital =

Hospital in New York, United States

Coordinates: 40°42′20″N 73°48′18″W

Mary Immaculate Hospital is a former hospital in Queens, NY. It was part of the Saint Vincent's Catholic Medical Center network. An attempt to save the hospital was made with a purchase by Jamaica Hospital.

== Current ==
The hospital is now an apartment complex by the name of Parkhill City.

== Patients ==
- Aniello Dellacroce (1914–1985), mobster; died from cancer
- Areti Koularmanis (1947–1970), victim of serial killer Joseph Baldi; died from her injuries
