= Samantha Cookes =

Convicted fraudster and writer

Samantha Jade Cookes
- Born: Samantha Jade Cookes; 1988 (age 37–38); Gloucester, UK
- Other names: Carrie Jade Williams; Jade O'Sullivan; Jade Cooke; Rebecca Fitzgerald; Lucy FitzWilliams; Sophia Williamson; Sadie Harris
- Education: Denmark Road High School; University of York (dropped out)
- Occupation: Writer
- Children: 3
- Convictions: 26 October 2011 (Teesside Crown Court); 11 February 2025 (Tralee Circuit Court)
- Criminal charges: Fraud by false representation, theft
- Penalty: Four years in jail with the final 12 months suspended

Samantha Jade Cookes (born 1988 in Gloucestershire, UK) is a serial fraudster with multiple criminal convictions.

First convicted in the UK in 2011, between 2014 and 2024 she perpetrated multiple scams in Ireland under the pseudonyms Carrie Jade Williams, Jade O'Sullivan, Jade Cooke, Rebecca Fitzgerald, Lucy FitzWilliams, Sophia Williamson and Sadie Harris. Often posing as a nanny or children's therapist, Cookes gained the trust of unsuspecting families, before fleeing when her deceptions were uncovered.

In 2020, posing as a writer with Huntington's disease, she won the Bodley Head/FT Essay Prize. Two years later, she appeared on social media platform TikTok, where her claims of being discriminated against because of her illness went viral. An investigation into these claims by Vice World News led to the exposure of her many other scams.

After repeatedly evading Gardaí, in July 2024 she was arrested in Tralee, Ireland for welfare fraud, deception, and theft. Remanded in custody for ten months, in March 2025 she was convicted and sentenced to three years in prison.

Following the initial Vice exposé, Cookes has been the subject of multiple news reports, podcasts and television documentaries.

== Background and early life ==
Cookes was born in Gloucestershire in 1988. She attended Denmark Road High School in the centre of Gloucester until 2007. She dropped out of a degree course at the University of York. In July 2008, Samantha gave birth to her first child, Martha Isabel Cookes, however the child died on the day she was due to be given up for adoption. A notebook was discovered by a woman Samantha had been working for as an au pair that contained a statement saying she did not kill her child. An inquest ruled the death an accident.

== Literary fraud ==
In June 2020 Cookes, using the name Carrie Jade Williams, joined an online creative writing group, and after a few months claimed she had acquired an agent and shows she’d written had been picked up by Netflix, HBO and the BBC. She also stated she had sold a novel. Later that year she won the Bodley Head/FT Essay Prize, a competition open to writers under the age of 35 sponsored by Bodley Head and the Financial Times. She received £1,000 for her winning entry, an essay about her diagnosis with Huntington’s disease. She said the piece had been written using speech-to-text software because she could no longer type, and it was published in FT Weekend. The essay received praise from public figures, including Hilary Knight, the Tate's director of digital strategy, who described it as "an incredibly moving read and a reminder we shouldn't need about designing for inclusion".

Three months earlier, Williams had been announced as writer-in-residence at the Irish Writers Centre at Cill Rialaig in south Kerry. The following year she received two grants from the Arts Council, worth €15,000 and €21,250 respectively. Her media profile expanded rapidly, with interviews on local and national radio and international appearances.

== Media depictions ==
=== Carrie Jade Does Not Exist ===
In 2023, Audio Always produced a six-part podcast series hosted by television presenter Sue Perkins and journalist Katherine Denkinson. The series retold the story that Katherine had written for Vice World News the year before, in which Cookes' claims of terminal illness, interactions with families, and other concerning behaviour was exposed and explored at length. After Cookes re-emerged in 2024, the series was extended to cover the events of her arrest and trial.

=== Swindled - "The Vacation Rental" ===
A 2023 bonus episode of Swindled, entitled "The Vacation Rental", examines Cookes' claims of a terminal illness, and her attempts to defraud Airbnb renters.

=== The Real Carrie Jade ===
In 2024, The RTÉ Radio Player produced a 8-episode podcast series, narrated by Justine Stafford about its interactions with and investigations of Cookes. Cookes had contacted RTÉ through its documentary department and Liveline. Eventually, RTÉ producer Ronan Kelly met with Cookes ("Carrie Jade") in Caherciveen, in County Kerry, and recorded her claims of being a disability advocate, as a self-professed sufferer of Huntington's disease. The series investigates these and other claims made by Cookes, and the money she fraudulently received from donors.

=== Bad Nanny ===
Bad Nanny is a two-part true crime documentary broadcast in May 2025 by RTÉ and BBC Northern Ireland. The series explores the case of Samantha Cookes, a serial fraudster who used multiple aliases – including Carrie Jade Williams, Lucy Hart, and Sadie Harris – to deceive individuals and families across Ireland and the UK over more than a decade. The documentary reveals how Cookes initially came to public attention in 2022 via emotional social media posts claiming she was terminally ill with Huntington's disease. Her story generated widespread sympathy until online communities began questioning the validity of her claims. Investigations led to the unmasking of her real identity and exposed a history of deception dating back years.

Featured in the series are several of Cookes’ victims, including a North Yorkshire couple she deceived while posing as a surrogate mother, and a family in County Offaly who unknowingly employed her as a nanny. In another instance, Cookes pretended to be a therapist for children with additional needs and collected money for a fake Lapland trip before disappearing.

The documentary aired on RTÉ One and BBC One Northern Ireland in May 2025, with streaming available on RTÉ Player and BBC iPlayer. The documentary was aired on BBC One in the rest of the UK in July 2025.

=== Strange But True Crime ===
A one-part podcast episode with BBC Sounds, in which journalist Rima Ahmed discusses the Carrie Jade Does Not Exist podcast and the work which led up to it.

== Conviction ==
Cookes was arrested in Tralee in 2024 and later convicted in March 2025 on multiple charges, including theft and welfare fraud. She received a four-year prison sentence with the final year suspended.

== See also ==
- Belle Gibson
- Alicia Esteve Head
- Misery literature
- List of impostors
