= Saturn Returns (play) =

2008 play

Saturn Returns is a 2008 dramatic play by Noah Haidle. It tells the story of one man, Gustin Novak, aged 28, 58 and 88, and his relationship with the central women in his life. It is based on the astrological concept of the Saturn return. Gustin is played by three different men, whilst the same woman plays his wife when he is 28, his daughter when he is 58, and his carer when he is 88.

The play premiered in New York in 2008, and had its European premiere in November 2010 at London's Finborough Theatre.

== Production history ==
Saturn Returns played at the Mitzi E. Newhouse Theater at Lincoln Center for the Performing Arts in New York City from 16 October 2008 - 4 January 2009, under the direction of Nicholas Martin.

The opening cast featured:

- Rosie Benton as Suzanne/Zephyr/Loretta
- Robert Eli as Gustin at 28
- John McMartin as Gustin at 88
- James Rebhorn as Gustin at 58

The play ran at the Finborough Theatre in London from 2–27 November 2010, directed by Adam Lenson and with Noah Haidle's creative involvement in revising the script.

The London cast featured:

- Lisa Caruccio Came as Suzanne/Zephyr/Loretta
- Richard Evans as Gustin at 88
- Nicholas Gecks as Gustin at 58
- Christopher Harper as Gustin at 28

The play ran with Theatre Exile in Philadelphia playing at the Christ Street Neighborhood House from April 28 - May 22, 2011, directed by Brenna Geffers.

The Philadelphia cast featured:

- Amanda Schoonover as Suzanne/Zephyr/Loretta
- Harry Philibosian as Gustin at 88
- Joe Canuso as Gustin at 58
- David Raphaely as Gustin at 28
