= Doc on One =

Irish radio documentary anthology series

The Documentary on One
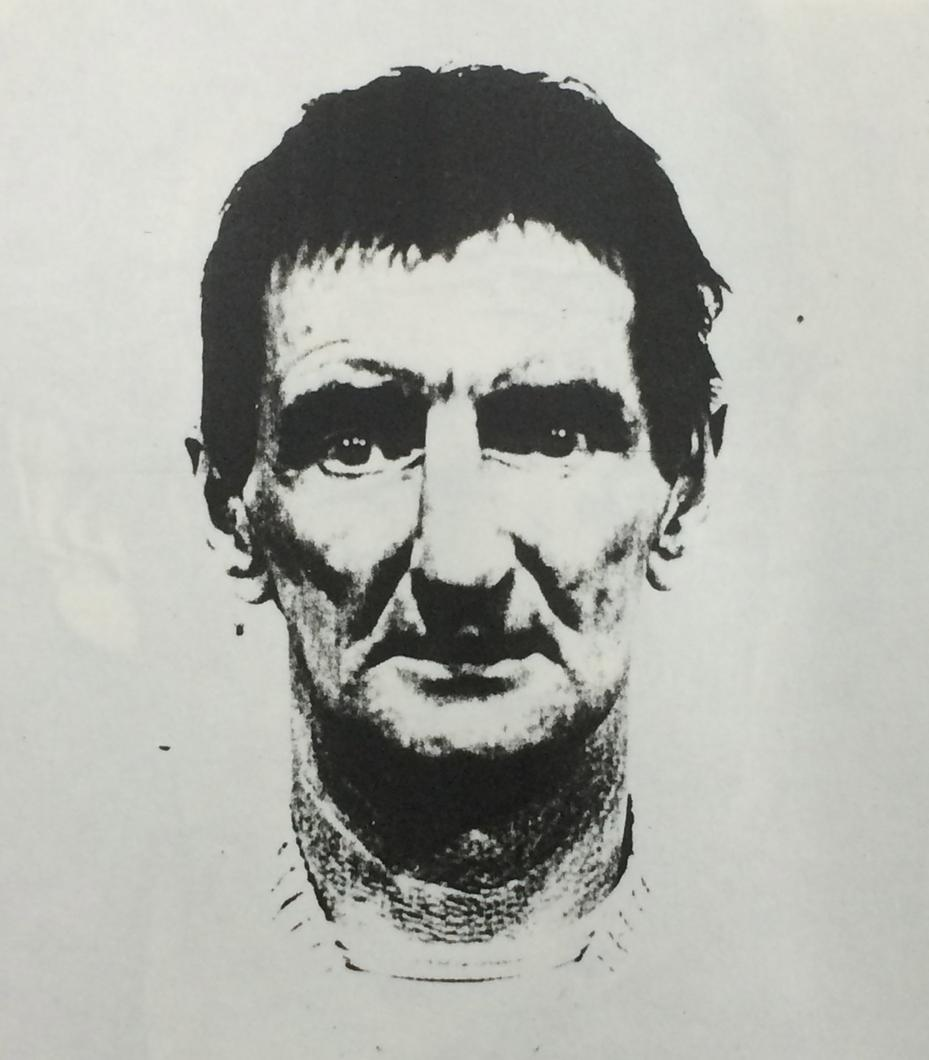
- Kieran Patrick Kelly - the subject of a 2020 Doc on One mini-series
- Genre: anthology documentary series
- Running time: 45 minutes
- Country of origin: Ireland
- Language: English
- Home station: RTÉ Radio 1
- Recording studio: RTÉ Radio Centre, Donnybrook, Dublin
- No. of episodes: 1,800+
- Audio format: Stereo
- Website: www.rte.ie/radio/doconone/
- Podcast: podcasts.apple.com/ie/podcast/documentary-on-one-podcast/id107923803

The RTÉ Documentary on One, or Doc on One, is an anthology documentary radio series broadcast by Irish public service broadcaster Raidió Teilifís Éireann's Radio 1 since the 1940s. Episodes are typically 45 minutes in length. A related series, The Curious Ear features episodes of c. 10 minutes duration.

The series' archives, featuring more than 1,800 individual episodes, are available from its website.

Mini-series produced by the Doc on One team have included The Nobody Zone, The Real Carrie Jade and Stolen Sister.
