= Stewart Parker Trust Awards =

Irish award for drama

The Stewart Parker Trust Award or Stewart Parker Prize was a set of Irish theatre awards. The Stewart Parker Trust was founded in 1988, named in honour of Northern Irish playwright Stewart Parker. The last set of awards were given in 2022, for playwrights shortlisted in 2019. Funding for up to three awards was provided by the An Chomhairle Ealaíon, the Arts Council of Northern Ireland, and the BBC, while guidance on the selection process was provided by the Irish Theatre Institute.

== History ==
The Stewart Parker Trust was founded in 1988 in honour of Northern Irish playwright Stewart Parker, after he died of cancer aged 47 in November 1988. John Fairleigh, who was for many years the honorary director of the Trust, was largely responsible for the administration of the awards from the start.

The trust first established the New Playwright Bursary. In 1997/8 two further awards were added: the BBC Stewart Parker Irish Language Award, for a new playwright working in the Irish language, and another one, "for a playwright whose work has contributed to the betterment of cross community understanding within Northern Ireland". Later, with the collaboration of BBC Northern Ireland (BBC NI), the BBC NI Radio Drama Award was created.

At the tenth anniversary of the awards, they were presented by the Irish President, Mary McAleese, at the Abbey Theatre in Dublin. She again presented the awards at the Abbey in 2009 (for 2008).

After Fairleigh had to leave the role, the workload became too large to be managed by volunteers. During the COVID-19 pandemic, a pause was put on the awards. In 2022, it was announced that the awards would be ended, with one last round made to the 2019 shortlisted candidates. The Irish Theatre Institute and BBC Northern Ireland (BBC NI) co-hosted the final ceremony in October 2022.

== Description ==
There was a cash bursary as part of the award, as well as a mentoring scheme. At the final ceremony, there were three award categories: the New Playwright Bursary, the BBC NI Radio Drama Award, and the BBC NI Irish Language Drama Award. Funding was provided by the An Chomhairle Ealaíon, the Arts Council of Northern Ireland, and the BBC, while guidance on the selection process was provided by the Irish Theatre Institute.

The winners were announced annually at the Lyric Theatre in Dublin.

== Previous winners ==
Previous winners of the award include:

- 1988: Sebastian Barry, for Boss Grady’s Boys
- 1993: Vincent Woods, for At the Black Pig's Dyke
- 1996: Gina Moxley, for Danti-Dan
- 1997?: Daragh Carville, for Language Roulette
- 2002: Tim Loane, for Caught Red Handed
- 2003: Micheál Ó Conghaile, for Cúigear Chonamara
- 2008: (Note: Awarded on 20 April 2009.) Abbie Spallen, New Playwright Bursary
- 2008: Elaine Murphy, BBC Northern Ireland Radio Drama Award
- 2008: Seán Ó Morónaigh, BBC Northern Ireland Irish Language Drama Award
- 2012: Nancy Harris, New Playwright Bursary for No Romance
- 2012: Stacey Gregg, BBC Radio Drama Award, for Perve
- 2012: Paul Mercier, BBC Northern Irish Language Award for Sétanta
- 2019: Meghan Tyler, New Playwright Bursary, for Crocodile Fever
- 2019: Seanan McDonnell, BBC NI Radio Drama Award, for So, Where Do We Begin?
- 2019: BBC Stewart Parker Irish Language Award jointly awarded to Philip Doherty, for Fiach, and Hilary Bowen-Walsh and Mumbo Top for Cara sa Chúirt

Other winners include: Jimmy McAleavey, Deirdre Kinahan, Conor McPherson, Éilís Ní Dhuibhne, Philip Davison, and Michael Harding.
