= Gillian Greer =

New Zealand writer, literary scholar, health advocate and NGO administrator (born 1944)

Gillian Greer CBE MNZM
- Born: 1944 (age 81–82); New Zealand
- Other name: Gillian Boddy
- Occupations: Scholar; health advocate; administrator; chief executive officer of numerous organisations
- Known for: Chief executive of the National Council of Women of New Zealand

Academic background
- Education: Victoria University of Wellington
- Thesis: The annotated notebooks of Katherine Mansfield, 1895 – July 1908, with commentary (1996)

Gillian Brooker Greer CBE MNZM (born 1944), also known as Gillian Boddy, is a New Zealand teacher, a literary scholar specialising in the works of Katherine Mansfield, a heath advocate, an advisor to the New Zealand Government and has been an administrator of numerous non profit organisations. She was the chief executive of the National Council of Women of New Zealand (NCWNZ) from 2017 to 2018 and an assistant vice-chancellor of Victoria University of Wellington.

== Early life and education ==
Greer was born in New Zealand but spent the early years of her childhood in Kuala Lumpur, Malaysia. When she was eight years old, she was sent to New Zealand to attend school. She graduated from the University of Auckland with a Bachelor of Arts, and went on to earn a PhD in New Zealand literature from Victoria University of Wellington. The title of her 1996 doctoral thesis was The annotated notebooks of Katherine Mansfield, 1895 – July 1908, with commentary.

== Career ==
Greer began her professional career by teaching at secondary schools including at Wellington Girls' College. She went on to become a respected literary scholar specialising in the work of Katherine Mansfield and about whom she has written two books. She was the researcher for the New Zealand television documentary A Portrait of Katherine Mansfield. Greer has also co-wrote a book on Robin Hyde.

From 1989 until 1998, Greer worked for Victoria University of Wellington, becoming the assistant vice-chancellor (equity and human resources). In 1998, she was appointed the chief executive officer of Family Planning New Zealand. In 2006, Greer was appointed the director-general of the International Planned Parenthood Federation (IPPF). Greer was subsequently appointed the chief executive office of Volunteer Service Abroad. After serving in this position until 2017, Greer then took up the position of chief executive of the National Council for Women in New Zealand. After a year in that position, in 2018, Greer was appointed director of Evofem Biosciences. In 2019, Greer was appointed the chief executive of Rare Disorders New Zealand. In 2019, she also co-edited The People’s Report on the 2030 Agenda and Sustainable Development Goals – 2019, on the Sustainable Development Goals.

== Honours and awards ==
In the 2005 New Year Honours, Greer was appointed a Member of the New Zealand Order of Merit, for services to family planning and literature. In the British 2012 New Year Honours, she was made a Commander of the Order of the British Empire, for services to international health and women’s rights. In 2019, Greer was conferred with an honorary doctorate by Victoria University of Wellington.
