= Shining City =

2004 play by Conor McPherson

Shining City is a play by Conor McPherson, set in Dublin, which was first performed in the West End in 2004.

== Plot overview ==
Shining City is a ghost story which recounts the visits of John, a widower, to Ian, a therapist, claiming he has seen his dead wife in their house. Ian is a former priest who has just started his therapy practice, and is struggling with his loss of faith. Ian and his girlfriend Neasa have a child, but Ian leaves her in a search for another life. The play charts the parallel trajectories of the two men in their struggle to understand what's happening.

== Productions ==
Shining City opened in the West End at the Royal Court Theatre on 4 June 2004, running to 17 July. The play starred Stanley Townsend as John and Michael McElhatton as Ian, with Kathy Kiera Clarke, Jeannie Lewis and Tom Jordan Murphy.

Michael Billington noted: "McPherson implies the Irish obsession with the dead is not just a religious hangover but a consequence of failure to achieve proper contact in life."

The play opened on Broadway at the Biltmore Theatre on 9 May 2006, and closed on 18 July 2006 after 80 performances and 21 previews. Directed by Robert Falls, the cast starred Brían F. O'Byrne (Ian), Oliver Platt (John), Martha Plimpton (Neasa), and Peter Scanavino (Laurence). The play received two 2006 Tony Award nominations, for Best Play and Best Actor in a Play (Platt). The New York Times critic Ben Brantley described it as a "Quiet, haunting and absolutely glorious new play... Shining City is as close to perfection as contemporary playwriting gets."

Shining City was performed as part of the Octagon Theatre, Bolton 40th anniversary season in May/June 2007 starring George Irving as John, a performance for which he was nominated for Best Actor in the Manchester Evening News theatre awards in November 2007.

The Irish Repertory Theatre is presenting the play Off-Broadway, in a limited engagement starting on 17 May 2016 in previews, officially on 9 June and closing on 3 July. The cast features Matthew Broderick as John, Billy Carter (Ian), Lisa Dwan and James Russell with direction by Ciarán O'Reilly. For his performance, Matthew Broderick won a 2017 Obie Award presented by the American Theatre Wing.

The play features music by Gene Clark including Fair And Tender Ladies by Gene Clark and Carla Olson.

Shining City will be performed at Theatre Royal Stratford East in September 2021, directed by Nadia Fall and starring Brendan Coyle.

== Awards and nominations ==
=== Original Broadway production ===
Year	Award	Category	Nominee	Result
2006	Drama Desk Award	Drama Desk Award for Outstanding Actor in a Play	Brian F. O'Byrne	Nominated
2006	Tony Award	Best Play		Nominated
2006	Tony Award	Best Performance by a Leading Actor in a Play	Oliver Platt	Nominated
