= Pumpgirl =

Play by Abbie Spallen

Pumpgirl is an acclaimed play by Abbie Spallen, which is set in County Armagh, Northern Ireland. It was a co-winner of the 2006–2007 Susan Smith Blackburn Prize for best play written in English by a woman.

Pumpgirl consists of interwoven monologues from three characters: the tomboyish Pumpgirl (worker at a rural gas station), the man she fancies, and his wife.

The play was performed at the Traverse Theatre, Edinburgh from 3 to 27 August 2006, and at the Bush Theatre, London from 12 September to 14 October 2006. Orla Fitzgerald played Pumpgirl, James Doran played Hammy, and Maggie Hayes played Sinéad, under the direction of Mike Bradwell.

In late 2007, Pumpgirl received its off-Broadway premiere at Manhattan Theatre Club.

Pumpgirl received its Irish premiere in Belfast, Queen's Drama Studio opening 3 September 2008 and toured throughout Ireland from 20 September to 11 October. The production was a Lyric Theatre Company production, starring Maggie Hayes as Sinéad, Stuart Graham as Hammy and Samantha Heaney as Pumpgirl and directed by Andrew Flynn.
