= Charles Yukl =

American ragtime pianist and murderer (1935–1982)

- Born: February 14, 1935; Baltimore, Maryland, USA
- Died: August 22, 1982 (aged 47); Clinton Correctional Facility, Dannemora, New York
- Cause of death: Suicide by hanging
- Other name: Yogi Freitag
- Occupation: Musician
- Criminal charge: Manslaughter

Details
- Span of crimes: 1966–1974
- Country: United States
- State: New York
- Targets: Suzanne Reynolds; Karin Schlegel
- Killed: 2
- Imprisoned at: Sing Sing; Wallkill Correctional Facility; Clinton Correctional Facility

Charles William "Charlie" Yukl (/ˈjʌkɛl/; YUH-kel; February 14, 1935 – August 22, 1982) was an American ragtime pianist and murderer from New York City.

== Early life ==
Charles William Yukl was born in Baltimore in 1935 to Czech parents, pianist and conductor Dorothea Freitag (Yukl) and trumpeter Charles W. Yukl; his brother Tex Yukl was born in 1938 in Falls Church, Virginia. Yukl could play piano and sight-read music by age 4, and studied at the Peabody Conservatory. His parents divorced when he was 7, and the boys and their father moved to Los Angeles. The New York Daily News reported that Yukl set eight fires at age 9, and the Los Angeles Times that Yukl later attributed beatings and random cruelties to his "perfectionist, demanding" parents. Yukl dropped out of North Hollywood High School, joined the U.S. Navy for two years, and returned to his mother in New York City. "Apparently urged" by his mother, Yukl became a professional ragtime pianist in Manhattan, in Union City, New Jersey, and in the Catskills, often using the name Yogi Freitag. He was also a volunteer auxiliary policeman, a musical director, a typist, an apartment manager, an accompanist, and a voice and piano teacher. He married fellow photography student Enken in 1961.

== Victims ==
=== Suzanne Reynolds ===
At 9:45 p.m. on Monday, October 24, 1966, Yukl called the police to report the finding of the nude body of 25-year-old Suzanne Reynolds, his $5-per-hour student and a native Floridian, in a vacant apartment in his building. He told Patrolman Charles McMillen of the 13th Precinct that after her regular voice lesson he had "returned from walking his dog, noticed the apartment door open, entered, found the body, and promptly notified the police," according to assistant district attorney Robert K. Tanenbaum. After hours of questioning, backup detectives, noticing unusual stains on Yukl's shoes, asked him to accompany them to the precinct house on East 21st Street, to which he consented. Not having direct evidence, police continued the questioning, with coffee and cigarette breaks, until 6:45 a.m., when "one of the detectives suddenly noticed stains on Yukl's trousers", leading immediately to a reading of Yukl's rights to remain silent, as defined by the U.S. Supreme Court only four months earlier.

At 10 a.m. on the 25th, facing continuous questioning, Yukl admitted having argued with Reynolds, and having sodomized the body upon discovery. After consulting his wife Enken with police permission, he stated that he wanted to provide more information, and met district attorney Frank Hogan's assistant John F. Keenan at 12:40 p.m. When Keenan requested the truth, Yukl proceeded to confess to the murder in detail: he had strangled her with a black necktie, paused to drink some Rheingold Beer, and dragged her stripped body upstairs and mutilated it with a knife, leaving a blood trail on the steps and skin traces in the carpet tacks and staples. By 1:45 p.m., Yukl had identified the tie retrieved by officers as the murder weapon. He was booked by Sergeant Francis McCluskey, appeared before Judge Francis O'Brien, and charged with murder by 3 p.m. the same day. His attorney had not arrived at the jail.

Yukl was indicted by a grand jury November 3, 1966, but did not stand trial, and was released on bail in July 1967. Because attorney George P. Monaghan held that the confession was invalid on the grounds that Yukl was not advised of his rights before interrogation began, Keenan (now prosecutor) and Monaghan plea-bargained in February 1968 to agree to a charge of manslaughter; Keenan later cited "grave fears" at the office about appeal and overturn and doubt about proving premeditation in a first-degree murder trial. Judge George Postel sentenced Yukl to seven and a half to fifteen years including time served. In a memo at sentencing, Keenan recommended against parole for "severity of crime and leniency of sentence".

A "model inmate", Yukl served five years and four months total (at state prisons; at Sing Sing from August 1969 to August 1970, called "two years" by the Daily News; and the remainder at the medium-security Wallkill Correctional Facility). He was paroled June 19, 1973, and moved into his wife's apartment in Greenwich Village. Wallkill superintendent Harold N. Butler, parole board spokesman Jerry Houlihan, and state psychiatrist Emanuel Feuer defended Yukl for parole as trustworthy and rehabilitated; Keenan's memo was the only negative indicator reported by parole board chair Paul J. Regan.

=== Karin Schlegel ===
Police stated Yukl then advertised in theatrical publications for actresses and photographer's models; he presented himself as a first-time film director. On August 20 or 21, 1974, the body of 23-year-old Karin Schlegel from Cresskill, New Jersey, (sometimes spelled "Karen") was found on the roof of a Greenwich Village apartment after being strangled, stripped, and mutilated.

Parole officer Benjamin Lichtenstein saw the TV report, recognized the address as Yukl's, and informed the 13th Precinct; also, "a veteran detective, Baezler, tipped Assistant D.A. Tanenbaum to the news, who carried it to Keenan." After an investigation, Yukl was arrested August 24 for the murder of the 19th, and indicted on September 6. Tanenbaum stated that the district attorney and chief of detectives rushed the arrest rather than set a trap to obtain a free confession, and reported "aghast" that Keenan "goaded a confession" even after Yukl asked for a lawyer. Lawrence Feitell was eventually appointed by the court as his lawyer, and Yukl struck another bargain on June 3, 1976, to plead guilty and accept a sentence of fifteen years to life.

== Death ==
On August 21, 1982, Yukl barricaded himself in his Clinton Correctional Facility cell, but was "talked out" by a psychologist and released to an observation cell in the infirmary. The next day he was found hanged with a strip of cloth torn from his mattress cover, with his death ruled a suicide.

== Legacy ==
=== The Piano Teacher ===
Assistant district attorney Robert K. Tanenbaum, who went on to an extended career as novelist and mayor of Beverly Hills, wrote the nonfiction The Piano Teacher: The True Story of a Psychotic Killer as his third book in 1987, collaborating with journalist and producer Peter S. Greenberg to depict Yukl's story in detail.

Reviewers said, "Stinging drama, moral momentum, and intelligent speculation about the flaws of the criminal justice system make this an unusually provocative and satisfying true-crime chronicle," "strangely sympathetic: He was a kind of monster, of course, but also a man who knew he was trapped." Other reviewers cited "disjointed and redundant maunderings", "careless oversights in the connective material", and "not much satisfaction in the way of pedagogy."

=== The Final Act ===
In "The Final Act", an episode of Investigation Discovery's documentary Fatal Encounters, which dramatizes real cases of killer-victim relationships, Yukl was portrayed by music director Kevin B. Winebold, who specializes in portraying serial killers and has had several such true crime reenactment roles. The episode was based on The Piano Teacher, according to Winebold; it was filmed in Manhattan in May and June 2013, and was broadcast in January 2014.

=== Recidivism ===
The Los Angeles Times echoed Tanenbaum's outrage at the insanity defense in the case of "a psychotic murderer able to masquerade as a meek music coach," with Kirkus Reviews calling him "blind to incriminating evidence" and People a "psychotic killer". Noting three other books of the same title, reviewer and music teaching association member Jennifer Lacy reported that "outrageous" piano teachers "make provocative fiction or bestselling pulp", describing Yukl as "a madman who was set on fulfilling his own sadistic and homicidal dreams."

Immediately upon the second murder, Yukl was regarded as a "textbook example" of the problems of rehabilitation and parole. Lawyer Feitell said, "All this cross-fire among different agencies to affix blame for his parole and early release is going to make it difficult to get a fair trial."

The L.A. Times said in relation to Yukl, "the revolving door of the criminal justice system has become a broken centrifuge, no longer capable of separating the reformed embezzler from the vicious murderer." It held that Schlegel's murder was "entirely attributable to the killer's premature release from prison. In Yukl's case as in thousands of others, the antiquated machinery of the law was completely overwhelmed by the job it was devised to perform." He became regarded as "a killer whose accomplice is the ineptness of the legal system."
