= Poster Boys (2020 film) =

- Directed by: Dave Minogue
- Written by: Dave Minogue
- Produced by: Jonathan Farrelly; Dave Minogue; Sinead O'Brien
- Starring: Trevor O'Connell; Ryan Minogue-Lee
- Cinematography: Trevor Murphy
- Edited by: John Phillipson
- Music by: Vyvienne Long
- Production company: Poster Boy Films
- Release dates: 7 July 2020 (Galway Film Fleadh); 9 July 2021 (Ireland)
- Running time: 87 minutes
- Country: Ireland
- Language: English

Poster Boys is a 2020 Irish comedy-drama film directed by Dave Minogue, starring Trevor O'Connell and Ryan Minogue-Lee.

== Cast ==
- Trevor O'Connell as Al Clancy
- Ryan Minogue-Lee as Karl Clancy
- Norma Sheahan as Minnie Clancy
- Amy Hughes as Ms Hughes
- Aoife Spratt as Aoife Clancy
- Joe Rooney as Joe
- Keith Duffy as himself
- Bobby Kerr as Ice Cream Man
- Dave Coffey as Tim
- Ian Dempsey as himself
- Ailish McCarthy as Sarah
- Justine Stafford as Niamh Tinder
- Laoisa Sexton as Sheila Matthews
- Kieran O'Reilly as Dermot Matthews
- Enya Martin as Mindy

== Release ==
The film premiered at the Galway Film Fleadh on 7 July 2020.

== Reception ==
Leslie Felperin of The Guardian rated the film 3 stars out of 5, writing that "it's hard not to be a little impressed with the fact that the film-makers pulled this off on a reportedly teensy budget." Davide Abbatescianni of Cineuropa wrote that the film is an "uplifting, entertaining (and family-friendly) piece, whose strongest assets are its wit and the presence of its two charismatic lead actors."

Film Ireland called it a "great escapist movie that packs a punch." Luke Maxwell of the Dublin Inquirer called it "sweet-natured and, at times, a little heavy-handed", and wrote that "its two leads work so well together that it doesn't really matter what the script has them doing."
