= Charlotte Moore (theater director) =

American theatre director (born 1939)

- Born: July 7, 1939 (age 87); Herrin, Illinois, United States
- Education: Smith College; Washington University in St. Louis

Charlotte Moore (born July 7, 1939) is an American actress and theater director, known for her work as the co-founder and artistic director of the Irish Repertory Theatre in New York City.

== Early life and education ==
Moore was born in Herrin, Illinois, to a family with Irish heritage; her grandparents emigrated from County Wexford in the 1840s. She earned her undergraduate degree at Smith College and later obtained a master's degree in comparative literature from Washington University in St. Louis, where she began pursuing acting.

== Career ==
=== Acting ===
Moore began her theatre career on Broadway, with notable performances including a role in Private Lives alongside Elizabeth Taylor and Richard Burton, and roles in Meet Me in St. Louis, and Morning's at Seven. She also worked with directors including Harold Prince and Ellis Rabb.

=== Irish Repertory Theatre ===
In 1988, Moore co-founded the Irish Repertory Theatre with Ciarán O'Reilly. The company's inaugural production was Sean O'Casey's The Plough and the Stars. Moore has directed several productions at the Irish Repertory Theatre, including Finian's Rainbow, The Streets of New York, and A Child's Christmas in Wales.

== Awards and recognition ==
Moore has been nominated for a Tony Award and has received an Outer Critics Circle Award and Drama Desk Award.

In 2011, Moore received the Eugene O'Neill Lifetime Achievement Award alongside Ciaran O'Reilly from the Irish American Writers & Artists organization. In 2019, Moore and O'Reilly were presented with the Irish Presidential Distinguished Service Award for the Irish Abroad by President Michael D. Higgins. Moore has also been inducted into the Irish America Hall of Fame and was recognized among Irish America's Top 50 Power Women.

== Personal life ==
Moore lives in New York City. Her partner, actor John McMartin, died of cancer in 2016, aged 86.
