= List of Ciarán Hinds performances =

Ciarán Hinds is an Irish actor who is known for his performances on the screen and stage. He has appeared in various film and television projects, as well as in numerous stage productions. His notable films include The Cook, the Thief, His Wife & Her Lover (1989), Persuasion (1995), Oscar and Lucinda (1997), Road to Perdition (2002), Lara Croft: Tomb Raider - The Cradle of Life (2003), Munich (2005 film), Amazing Grace (2007), There Will Be Blood (2007), In Bruges (2008), Miss Pettigrew Lives for a Day (2008), Harry Potter and the Deathly Hallows – Part 2 (2011), Tinker Tailor Soldier Spy (2011), Silence (2016), First Man (2018), and Belfast (2021), the latter for which he received an Academy Award nomination for Best Supporting Actor. His television roles include Gaius Julius Caesar in the series Rome, DCI James Langton in Above Suspicion, and Mance Rayder in Game of Thrones. He has worked continuously in the theatre throughout most of his career, having spent a majority of it with the Royal Shakespeare Company, the Royal National Theatre, and six seasons with the Glasgow Citizens' Theatre.

== Film ==
Year	Title	Role	Notes
1981	Excalibur	King Lot	Credited as Ciarin Hinds
1989	The Cook, the Thief, His Wife & Her Lover	Cory	
1991	December Bride	Frank Echlin	
1995	Persuasion	Captain Frederick Wentworth	
1995	Circle of Friends	Professor Flynn	
1996	Mary Reilly	Sir Danvers Carew	Credited as Ciaran Hinds
1996	Some Mother's Son	Danny Boyle	
1997	The Life of Stuff	David Arbogast	
1997	Oscar and Lucinda	Rev. Dennis Hasset	Credited as Ciaran Hinds
1998	Titanic Town	Aidan McPhelimy	
1999	The Lost Son	Carlos	
1999	The Lost Lover	Adam	
2000	The Weight of Water	Louis Wagner	
2002	The Sum of All Fears	President Alexander Nemerov	
2002	Road to Perdition	Finn McGovern	
2003	Veronica Guerin	John Traynor	
2003	Lara Croft: Tomb Raider – The Cradle of Life	Dr. Jonathan Reiss	
2003	Calendar Girls	Rod	
2003	The Statement	Pochon	
2004	Mickybo and Me	Jonjo's Da	
2004	The Phantom of the Opera	Richard Firmin	
2005	Munich	Carl	
2006	Miami Vice	FBI Agent John Fujima	
2006	Amazing Grace	Lord Tarleton	
2006	The Tiger's Tail	Father Andy	
2006	The Nativity Story	King Herod	
2007	Hallam Foe	Julius Foe	
2007	Margot at the Wedding	Dick Koosman	
2007	There Will Be Blood	Fletcher Hamilton	
2008	In Bruges	The Priest	Uncredited
2008	Miss Pettigrew Lives for a Day	Joe Blomfield	
2008	Stop-Loss	Roy King	
2008	Cash	Barnes	
2008	The Tale of Despereaux	Botticelli Remorso	Voice role
2009	Race to Witch Mountain	Henry Burke	
2009	The Eclipse	Michael Farr	
2009	Life During Wartime	Bill Maplewood	
2011	Harry Potter and the Deathly Hallows – Part 2	Aberforth Dumbledore	
2011	The Debt	David Peretz	
2011	The Rite	Father Xavier	
2011	Salvation Boulevard	Jim Hunt	
2011	Tinker Tailor Soldier Spy	Roy Bland	
2011	The Shore	Jim	
2011	Ghost Rider: Spirit of Vengeance	Roarke / Mephistopheles	
2012	The Woman in Black	Sam Daily	
2012	John Carter	Tardos Mors	
2013	Closed Circuit	Devlin	
2013	The Sea	Max Morden	
2013	The Disappearance of Eleanor Rigby	Spencer Ludlow	
2013	Frozen	Grand Pabbie	Voice role
2013	McCanick	Quinn	
2015	Last Days in the Desert	Father	
2015	Hitman: Agent 47	Dr. Litvenko	
2015	The Driftless Area	Ned	
2016	Bleed for This	Angelo Pazienza	
2016	Silence	Father Valignano	
2017	Axis	Jim	Voice role
2017	Woman Walks Ahead	James McLaughlin	
2017	Justice League	Steppenwolf	Voice and motion capture
2018	Red Sparrow	Colonel Zakharov	
2018	Elizabeth Harvest	Henry	
2018	First Man	Robert R. Gilruth	
2019	Frozen 2	Grand Pabbie	Voice role
2020	The Man in the Hat	The Thin Man	
2021	Zack Snyder's Justice League	Steppenwolf	Voice and motion capture
2021	Belfast	"Pop"	
2022	The Wonder	Father Thaddeus	
2023	In the Land of Saints and Sinners	Vinnie O'Shea	
2023	Cottontail	John	
2023	The Family Plan	McCaffrey	
2025	Words of War	Dmitry Muratov	
2025	Is This Thing On?	Jan	
2026	Midwinter Break	Gerry	
2027	Narnia: The Magician's Nephew †		Post-production
TBA	Cry to Heaven †	Andrea	Post-production
TBA	Walk the Blue Fields †		Post-production
TBA	Isle of Man †		Filming

== Television ==
Year	Title	Role	Notes
1981	Our Boys	Brother	Television short
1985	We'll Support You Evermore	O'Hagan	BBC TV movie
1989	The Mahabharata	Ashwathama	3 episodes
1990	Who Bombed Birmingham?	Richard McIlkenny	Television film
1990	The Play on One	Martin Pitt	Episode: "Yellowbacks"
1992	Perfect Scoundrels	Jack Vosper	Episode: "The Good-Bye Look"
1992	Between the Lines	Det. Insp. Micky Flynn	Episode: "Private Enterprise"
1992	Hostages	Brian Keenan	Television film
1993	The Man Who Cried	Abel Mason	Television film
1993	Prime Suspect 3	Edward Parker-Jones	2 episodes
1993	Soldier Soldier	Clive Hickey	Episode: "Trouble and Strife"
1994	The Memoirs of Sherlock Holmes	Jim Browner	Episode: "The Cardboard Box"
1994	A Dark-Adapted Eye	Paolo	Episode #1.2
1994	Seaforth	John Stacey	6 episodes
1995	The Affair	Edward Leyland	Television film
1996	Testament: The Bible in Animation	Lucifer / Satan	Episode: "Creation and the Flood"; Voice only
1996	Tales from The Crypt	Jack Lynch	Episode: "Confession"
1996	Cold Lazarus	Fyodor	4 episodes
1997	Jane Eyre	Edward Rochester	Television film
1997	Ivanhoe	Brian de Bois-Guilbert	6 episodes
1997	Rules of Engagement	Cambell Ferguson	Television film
1998	Getting Hurt	Charlie Cross	Television film
2000	Jason and the Argonauts	King Aeson	2 episodes
2000	The Sleeper	Fergus Moon	Miniseries
2000	Thursday the 12th	Marius Bannister	Television film
2003	Broken Morning	Albert Camus	Television film
2004	The Mayor of Casterbridge	Michael Henchard	Television film; credited as Ciaran Hinds
2005–2007	Rome	Gaius Julius Caesar	13 episodes
2009	Above Suspicion	DCI James Langton	2 episodes
2010	Above Suspicion: The Red Dahlia	DCI James Langton	3 episodes
2011	Above Suspicion: Deadly Intent	DCI James Langton	3 episodes
2012	Above Suspicion: Silent Scream	DCI James Langton	3 episodes
2012	Political Animals	Bud Hammond	6 episodes
2013–2015	Game of Thrones	Mance Rayder	5 episodes
2016	Shetland	Michael Maguire	3 episodes
2016	LEGO Frozen Northern Lights	Grand Pabbie	Voice role; special
2018	The Terror	Sir John Franklin	Miniseries; 3 episodes
2021	Kin	Eamonn Cunningham	8 episodes
2022	The English	Richard M Watts	Episode: "What You Want & What You Need"
2022	Treason	Sir Martin Angelis	4 episodes
2022–2026	The Dry	Tom Sheridan	24 episodes
2024	The Lord of the Rings: The Rings of Power	The Dark Wizard	Season 2
2025	The Narrow Road to the Deep North	Older Dorrigo Evans	5 episodes
2026	East of Eden	Samuel Hamilton	Upcoming series

== Theatre ==
Year	Title	Role	Playwright	Director	Theatre	Ref.
1975	The Seagull	Konstantin (Kostya)	Anton Chekhov	Peter Watson	Royal Academy of Dramatic Art	
1975	Arden of Faversham	Black Will	Anonymous	Geoff Bullen	Royal Academy of Dramatic Art	
1975	Hamp	Prosecutive officer	John Wilson	Euan Smith	Royal Academy of Dramatic Art	
1975	Objections to Sex and Violence	Arrogant pseudo-intellectual	Caryl Churchill	Caryl Churchill	Royal Academy of Dramatic Art	
1976	When Thou Art King		John Barton	John Barton	Royal Academy of Dramatic Art	
1976	The Night of the Iguana	Nonno	Tennessee Williams		Royal Academy of Dramatic Art	
1976–77	Cinderella	Albert the Horse, Courtier	Sid Colin, David Wood	Giles Havergal	Glasgow Citizens Theatre Company	
1976–77	The Country Wife	Mrs Dainty Fidget	William Wycherley	Philip Prowse	Glasgow Citizens Theatre Company	
1976–77	The Importance of Being Earnest	Lane	Oscar Wilde	Giles Havergal	Glasgow Citizens Theatre Company	
1976–77	Macbeth	Malcolm, Third Murderer	William Shakespeare	Giles Havergal	Glasgow Citizens Theatre Company	
1976–77	Chinchilla	Tancredi	Robert David MacDonald	Philip Prowse	Glasgow Citizens Theatre Company	
1976–77	Figaro	A policeman, a lawyer	Pierre de Beaumarchais	Robert David MacDonald	Glasgow Citizens Theatre Company	
1977–78	Semi-Monde	Freddy Palmer	Noël Coward	Philip Prowse	Glasgow Citizens Theatre Company	
1977–78	Vautrin	Joseph	Honoré de Balzac	Robert David MacDonald	Glasgow Citizens Theatre Company	
1977–78	Loot	McLeavy	Joe Orton	Giles Havergal	Glasgow Citizens Theatre Company	
1977–78	Mother Goose	Villager	Myles Rudge	Giles Havergal	Glasgow Citizens Theatre Company	
1977–78	No Orchids for Miss Blandish	Johnny Frisk	Robert David MacDonald; James Hadley Chase	Robert David MacDonald	Glasgow Citizens Theatre Company	
1977–78	Painter's Palace of Pleasure	Giovanni	John Ford; John Webster	Philip Prowse	Glasgow Citizens Theatre Company	
1977–78	Equus		Peter Shaffer		Lyric Theatre, Belfast	
1978–79	The Threepenny Opera	J. J. Peachum	Bertolt Brecht, Kurt Weill	Philip Prowse	Glasgow Citizens Theatre Company	
1978–79	The Seagull	Dr Dorn	Anton Chekhov	Philip Prowse	Glasgow Citizens Theatre Company	
1978–79	Dick Whittington	The Emperor of Morocco	Myles Rudge	Giles Havergal	Glasgow Citizens Theatre Company	
1978–79	Country Life	Guglielmo	Carlo Goldoni	Robert David MacDonald	Glasgow Citizens Theatre Company	
1978–79	Whose Life Is it Anyway?	Philip Hill (The Solicitor)	Brian Clark	Tony Dinner	Lyric Theatre, Belfast	
1978–79	Once a Catholic	Derek (a Teddy Boy)	Mary O'Malley	Michael Poynor	Lyric Theatre, Belfast	
1979	The Death of Humpty Dumpty	Doctor	J. Graham Reid	Patrick Mason	Abbey/Peacock Theatres, Dublin	
1979–80	The Ha'penny Place	Hare Krishna/Yehudi	Jim Sheridan	Peter Sheridan	Project Arts Centre, Dublin	
1979–80	The Liberty Suit		Peter Sheridan	Jim Sheridan	Project Arts Centre, Dublin	
1980–81	The Battlefield	Faustino	Carlo Goldoni	Robert David MacDonald	Glasgow Citizens Theatre Company	
1980–81	The Caucasian Chalk Circle	Shauva (The Policeman); Prince Georgi	Bertolt Brecht	Giles Havergal	Glasgow Citizens Theatre Company	
1980–81	Don Juan	Father Juan	Robert David MacDonald	Philip Prowse	Glasgow Citizens Theatre Company	
1980–81	Desperado Corner	Frank	Shaun Lawton	Di Trevis	Glasgow Citizens Theatre Company	
1980–81	Madame Louise	Bishop of Porchester	Vernon Sylvaine	Giles Havergal	Glasgow Citizens Theatre Company	
1981	Bent	Greta/George	Martin Sherman	Michael Scott	Project Arts Centre, Dublin	
1981	Krieg	Jet	Liam Lynch	Patrick Mason	Project Arts Centre, Dublin	
1981	The Seagull	Konstantin (Kostya)	Anton Chekhov; Thomas Kilroy	Patrick Mason	Grand Opera House, Belfast	
1982	Curse of the Starving Class		Sam Shepard		Project Arts Centre, Dublin	
1982	On Baile's Strand	Cuchulain	James Ellis, W. B. Yeats	Christopher Fitz-Simon	Belltable Arts Centre, Limerick	
1982	Waiting for Godot	Estragon	Samuel Beckett	Ben Barnes	Belltable Arts Centre, Limerick	
1982	Blood and Ice	Byron/The Monster	Liz Lochhead	Kenny Ireland	Traverse Theatre Company, Edinburgh	
1982–83	The Roman Actor	Paris	Philip Massinger	Philip Prowse	Glasgow Citizens Theatre Company	
1982–83	Red Roses for Me	Brennan O' the Moor	Seán O'Casey	Giles Havergal	Glasgow Citizens Theatre Company	
1982–83	Torquato Tasso	Antonio Montecatino	Johann Wolfgang von Goethe	Robert David MacDonald	Glasgow Citizens Theatre Company	
1982–83	The Mother	Savely	Bertolt Brecht	Giles Havergal	Glasgow Citizens Theatre Company	
1982–83	The Impresario from Smyrna	Maccario	Carlo Goldoni	Robert David MacDonald	Glasgow Citizens Theatre Company	
1982–83	The Merchant of Venice	Antonio	William Shakespeare	Philip Prowse	Glasgow Citizens Theatre Company	
1982–83	Arms and the Man	Nicola, man-servant	George Bernard Shaw	Giles Havergal	Glasgow Citizens Theatre Company	
1982–83	Sirocco	Tonio	Noël Coward	Philip Prowse	Glasgow Citizens Theatre Company	
1982–83	Webster	Webster	Robert David MacDonald	Philip Prowse	Glasgow Citizens Theatre Company	
1983	The Last Days of Mankind	A Man of Government	Karl Kraus	Robert David MacDonald	Glasgow Citizens Theatre Company	
1983	Rosenkavalier	Valzacchi	Hugo von Hofmannsthal	Philip Prowse	Glasgow Citizens Theatre Company	
1983	Juno and the Paycock	Captain Jack Boyle	Seán O'Casey	Giles Havergal	Glasgow Citizens Theatre Company	
1983	Oroonoko	Lieutenant Governor	Thomas Southerne	Philip Prowse	Glasgow Citizens Theatre Company	
1983	Indian Summer	Cathal Dillon	Jennifer Johnston	Robert Cooper	Lyric Theatre, Belfast	
1984	The White Devil	Lodovico	John Webster	Philip Prowse	Greenwich Theatre, London	
1984	The Way of the World	Fainall	William Congreve	Giles Havergal	Greenwich Theatre, London	
1984	The Seagull	Trigorin	Anton Chekhov	Philip Prowse	Greenwich Theatre, London	
1984	The Riot Act (Antigone)	Chorus leader	Tom Paulin	Stephen Rea	Field Day Touring Company, Derry	
1984	High Time (School for Husbands)	High Tech	Derek Mahon	Wolk and Long	Field Day Touring Company, Derry	
1985	Mary Stuart	Paulet	Friedrich von Schiller	Philip Prowse	Glasgow Citizens Theatre Company	
1985	Blithe Spirit	Charles Condomine	Noël Coward	Giles Havergal	Glasgow Citizens Theatre Company	
1985	The Plough and the Stars	Jack Clitheroe	Seán O'Casey	Giles Havergal	Glasgow Citizens Theatre Company	
1985	Arsenic and Old Lace	"Uncle" Teddy	Joseph Kesselring	Giles Havergal	Glasgow Citizens Theatre Company	
1985	Faust	Minister of State	Johann Wolfgang von Goethe	Robert David MacDonald	Glasgow Citizens Theatre Company	
1985	'Tis Pity She's a Whore	Giovanni	John Ford	Garry Hynes	Druid Theatre Company, Galway	
1985	The Importance of Being Earnest	John Worthing	Oscar Wilde	John Ford, Garry Hynes	Druid Theatre Company, Galway	
1986	The Representative	Pope Pius XII	Rolf Hochhuth	Robert David MacDonald	Glasgow Citizens Theatre Company	
1986	Hidden Fires	Clavaroche	Alfred de Musset	Robert David MacDonald	Glasgow Citizens Theatre Company	
1986	The Orphan	Castalio	Thomas Otway	Philip Prowse	Greenwich Theatre, London	
1986	I Do Like to Be	David	Shane Connaughton	Jeff Teare	The Irish Company	
1986	Observe the Sons of Ulster; Marching Towards the Somme	George Anderson	Frank McGuinness	Michael Attenborough	Hampstead Theatre, London	
1987	Dialann Ocrais; Diary of a Hunger Strike	O'Connor	Peter Sheridan	Peter Sheridan	Abbey/Peacock Theatres, Dublin	
1987	Mahabharata		Adapted by Jean-Claude Carrière	Peter Brook	Ashwattaman/Nakula World Tour	
1988	The Lady from the Sea	The Stranger	Henrik Ibsen	Tom Cairns	Glasgow Citizens Theatre Company	
1988	Richard III	Richard III	William Shakespeare	Jon Pope	Glasgow Citizens Theatre Company	
1989	Cuchulain Cycle	Cuchulain	W. B. Yeats	James W. Flannery	Abbey/Peacock Theatres, Dublin	
1990–91	The Last Days of Don Juan	Don Pedro Tenorio	Tirso de Molina, Nick Dear	Danny Boyle	Royal Shakespeare Company	
1990–91	Edward II	Roger Mortimer	Christopher Marlowe	Gerard Murphy	Royal Shakespeare Company	
1990–91	Two Shakespearean Actors	Dion Boucicault	Richard Nelson	Roger Michell	Royal Shakespeare Company	
1990–91	Troilus and Cressida	Achilles	William Shakespeare	Sam Mendes	Royal Shakespeare Company	
1992	Assassins	Samuel Byck	Stephen Sondheim, John Weidman	Sam Mendes	Donmar Warehouse, London	
1993	Richard III	Richard III	William Shakespeare	Sam Mendes	Royal Shakespeare Company	
1993	Machinal	The Young Man	Sophie Treadwell	Stephen Daldry	Royal National Theatre, London	
1995	Simpatico	Vinnie	Sam Shepard	James Macdonald	Royal Court Theatre, London	
1997	Closer	Larry	Patrick Marber	Patrick Marber	Royal National Theatre, London	
1999	Closer	Larry	Patrick Marber	Patrick Marber	Music Box Theatre, New York	
2001	The Yalta Game	Gurov	Anton Chekhov, Brian Friel	Karel Reisz	Gate Theatre, Dublin	
2007	The Seafarer	Mr. Lockhart	Conor McPherson	Conor McPherson	Booth Theatre, New York	
2009	The Birds	Nat	Conor McPherson	Conor McPherson	Gate Theatre, Dublin	
2009	Burnt by the Sun	Serguei Petrovitch Kotov	Peter Flannery	Howard Davies	Royal National Theatre, London	
2011	Juno and the Paycock	Captain Jack Boyle	Seán O'Casey	Howard Davies	Royal National Theatre, London	
2011	Juno and the Paycock	Captain Jack Boyle	Seán O'Casey	Howard Davies	Abbey/Peacock Theatres, Dublin	
2013	The Night Alive	Tommy	Conor McPherson	Conor McPherson	Donmar Warehouse, London; Atlantic Theater Company, New York	
2014	Our Few and Evil Days	Michael	Mark O'Rowe	Mark O'Rowe	Abbey/Peacock Theatres, Dublin	
2015	Hamlet	Claudius	William Shakespeare	Lynsey Turner	Barbican Centre, London	
2016	The Crucible	Deputy Governor Danforth	Arthur Miller	Ivo van Hove	Walter Kerr Theatre, New York	
2017	Girl from the North Country	Nick Lane	Conor McPherson	Conor McPherson	The Old Vic; The Noel Coward Theatre	
2018	Translations	Hugh	Brian Friel	Ian Rickson	Royal National Theatre, London	
2020	Uncle Vanya	Professor Serebryakov	Anton Chekhov	Ian Rickson	Harold Pinter Theatre	
