= Fly by Night =

Fly by Night or Fly-by-Night may refer to:

== Film and television ==
- Fly-by-Night (film), a 1942 American thriller
- Fly by Night (TV play), a 1962 Australian TV play
- Fly by Night, a 1992 film directed by Steve Gomer
- Fly by Night (film), a 2019 Malaysian crime thriller
- Fly by Night (TV series), a 1991 Canadian adventure series starring David James Elliott
- "Fly by Night" (Mighty Max), an episode of the television series Mighty Max

== Fiction ==
- Fly by Night (Hardinge novel), a 2005 children's novel by Frances Hardinge
- Fly-by-Night (Peyton novel), a 1968 children's novel by K. M. Peyton
- "Fly-by-Night", a short story by Larry Niven included in the Man-Kzin Wars collections
- "Fly-by-Night", a mysterious flower in the Japanese animated film Mary and the Witch's Flower

== Music ==
- Fly by Night (album), a 1975 album by Rush
- "Fly by Night" (Rush song), 1975
- "Fly by Night" (Andy Williams song), 1961
- "Fly by Night", a song by Ian Anderson from Walk into Light
- "Fly by Night", a song by Matt Bianco from Matt Bianco
- Fly by Night (musical), a musical written by Will Connolly, Michael Mitnick, and Kim Rosenstock

== Other uses ==
- Fly by Night Theatre Company, an Irish theatre company
