= Come On Over (disambiguation) =

Come On Over is a 1997 album by Shania Twain.

Come On Over may also refer to:

== Music ==
=== Songs ===
- "Come On Over" (Bee Gees song), 1975, later covered by Olivia Newton-John
- "Come On Over" (Jessica Simpson song), 2008
- "Come On Over" (Royal Blood song), 2014
- "Come On Over" (Shania Twain song), 1999
- "Come On Over" (Kym Marsh song), 2003

=== Albums ===
- Come On Over (Olivia Newton-John album), 1976
- Come On Over (Plain White T's album)
- Come On Over, by Tyrone Davis

== Other uses ==
- Come On Over (film), 1922 American film directed by Alfred E. Green
- Come On Over (play), by Conor McPherson
- Come On Over (TV series), an American children's television series

== See also ==
- "Come On Over Baby (All I Want Is You)", by Christina Aguilera
- Come Over (disambiguation)
- "Streetcorner Symphony", by Rob Thomas
