= Port Authority (play) =

- Poster for the 2014 Hyde Park Theatre production
- Written by: Conor McPherson
- Characters: Dermot; Kevin; Joe
- Original language: English
- Genre: Black comedy, tragicomedy

Premiere
- Date premiered: 22 February 2001
- Place premiered: New Ambassadors Theatre, London

Port Authority is a 2001 play by Conor McPherson.

== Overview ==
The play tells of three interwoven lives, the "three ages of man": Kevin, a boy leaves home for the first time; Dermot is a man who starts a job for which he is unqualified and chosen by mistake; Joe is a widower pensioner and is sent a mysterious package. The common thread is what could have happened, and did not, in the three lives presented.

== Productions ==
The play premiered in a Gate Theatre of Dublin production at the New Ambassadors Theatre in London from 22 February 2001 to 31 March 2001. The play transferred to the Gate Theatre from 24 April 2001 to 2 June 2001. The cast starred Éanna MacLiam (Kevin), Stephen Brennan (Dermot), and Jim Norton (Jo). The production was directed by Conor McPherson himself.

The play premiered Off-Broadway, produced by the Atlantic Theater Company in a limited run from April 8, 2008 (previews), officially on May 21 and closed on June 22, 2008. The play starred Brian d'Arcy James (Dermot), John Gallagher Jr. (Kevin) and Jim Norton (Joe). Brian d'Arcy James was nominated for the 2009 Drama Desk Award, Outstanding Featured Actor in a Play and the 2009 Lucille Lortel Award, Outstanding Lead Actor.

In 2012 Rhapsody of Words Productions will stage the play at the Southwark Playhouse in London, starring Ardal O'Hanlon, John Rogan and Andrew Nolan. The production will be directed by Tom Attenborough.

In October to November 2014 the play ran at The Irish Repertory Theatre in New York City. The cast featured James Russell (Kevin), Peter Maloney (Joe) and Billy Carter (Dermot), directed by Ciaran O'Reilly.
