= Betty Ann Norton =

Irish drama teacher (1936–2020)

- Born: Betty Ann Norton; 5 July 1936
- Died: 5 June 2020 (aged 83); Beacon Hospital, Dublin, Ireland
- Occupation: Acting teacher
- Years active: 1959–2020
- Spouse(s): Michael J. Cunneen (1967–2017; his death)
- Relatives: Jim Norton (brother)

Betty Ann Norton (5 July 1936 – 5 June 2020) was an Irish drama teacher and founder of the Betty Ann Norton Theatre School and actor agency.

== Background ==
Norton was born in 1936 and grew up in Dublin near the South Circular Road. Her mother, Frances, played the violin and her father, Eugene, was a baritone singer. Frances was a full-time homemaker while Eugene worked as manager of the Bacon Shops on Grafton Street. One of two children, her younger brother Jim Norton also became a successful actor. She attended school at St Louis High School, Rathmines.

== Training ==
Norton attended the Ena Mary Burke School of Drama and Elocution on Kildare Street, Dublin, where Hollywood star Maureen O'Hara had also trained. Norton's acting school offers an annual Ena Mary Burke scholarship in Burke's honour.

Norton was a Licentiate of the Guildhall School of Music and Drama (LGSM) in London and Associate of the Royal Irish Academy of Music (ARIAM) in Dublin. She was a member of the Dublin Shakespeare Society.

== Theatre school ==
Norton originally planned to become an actor, but her family did not approve and her mother Frances encouraged her to become a teacher. In 1959 Norton established the Betty Ann Norton Theatre School on Harcourt Street in Dublin. Her husband, Michael, was co-director of the school. According to Norton, changes to traffic by the new Luas tram system caused the business to change premises to her childhood school, St Louis High School, Rathmines, in 2006.

Alumni of the School include:

- Claudia Boyle, opera singer
- Claudia Carroll, actor and author
- Peter Crawley, art critic for The Irish Times
- Jim Culleton, actor
- Pádraic Delaney, actor
- Moya Doherty, founder of RIverdance
- Emma Donoghue, author and playwright
- Danielle Galligan, actor
- Ruth Gilligan, author
- Amy Huberman, actor and author
- Dervla Kirwan, actor
- Áine Lawlor, broadcaster
- Justine Mitchell, actor
- Diarmuid Noyes, actor
- Hugh O'Conor, actor
- Jim O'Hanlon, director
- Shane O'Reilly, actor
- Marian Richardson, broadcaster, actor, and producer
- Eleanor Shanley, singer

== Personal life ==
Norton met her husband Michael J. Cunneen on the Aran Islands in 1965 and they married in 1967. They lived in Dún Laoghaire. Michael died in the Blackrock Clinic on 12 May 2017.

== Death ==
Norton died in the Beacon Hospital on 5 June 2020 at the age of 83. She was cremated and interred at Mount Jerome Cemetery and Crematorium. President of Ireland, Michael D. Higgins, paid tribute to Norton, describing her as a "theatre legend" and "one of our foremost theatre teachers".
