= Fly by Night Theatre Company =

Irish theatre company

Fly by Night Theatre Company is an Irish theatre company based in Dublin. Established in the summer of 1992, it was primarily founded by students from University College Dublin who were active members of UCD Dramsoc, the university's drama society. Key founding members included Richard Brennan, Jason Byrne, Kevin Hely, Peter McDonald, Conor McPherson, Colin O'Connor, and Valerie Spelman.

The company's inaugural production was Radio Play (Concerning Communication) by Conor McPherson. The original cast featured Brennan, Byrne, Hely, McPherson, as well as Rebecca Bickerdike, Ciara Considine, and Coilín O'Connor. McPherson also directed the play, which was performed from August 17–29, 1992, at the International Bar in Dublin.

The company went on to produce the following plays by McPherson:

- A Light in the Window of Industry (International Bar, August 3–21, 1993)
- Inventing Fortune's Wheel (Firkin Crane Theatre, Cork, March 3, 1994)
- The Light of Jesus (a.k.a. The Good Thief) (City Arts Centre, April 18–30, 1994)
- The Stars Lose Their Glory (International Bar, August 1–13, 1994)
- Rum and Vodka (City Arts Centre, September 1994)
- This Lime Tree Bower (in collaboration with Íomha Ildánach Theatre Company, Crypt Arts Centre, Dublin Castle, October 26, 1995; project@the mint and national tour, 1998)

The company also produced works by Colin O'Connor, including:

- Van Gogh's Ear (International Bar, August 16, 1993)
- The Stranger (Player's Theatre, July 16, 1996)
- All Those Trammelling Dreams (Crypt Arts Centre, Dublin Castle, 1997)
- The Last Days of God (THEatre Space @ Henry Place, May 31 – June 17, 2000).

Hiatus

The company has not staged any new performances since June 2000.

Notable Members

- Conor McPherson: An internationally acclaimed playwright, theatre director, film director, and occasional actor.
- Peter McDonald: A successful actor known for both stage and film work.
- Jason Byrne: A prominent theatre director.
