= This Lime Tree Bower =

Play by Conor McPherson

This Lime Tree Bower is an early play by Conor McPherson. The title is taken from the 1797 poem of the same name by Samuel Taylor Coleridge.

== Productions ==
The play was originally produced by Fly By Night Theatre Company, which was formed by McPherson and others. It was performed at the Crypt Arts Centre, Dublin in October 1995 and directed by McPherson.

The play transferred to the Bush Theatre, London, running in July 1996 to 6 August, starring Ian Cregg (Joe), Conor Mullen (Ray), and Niall Shanahan (Frank).

The played opened Off-Broadway at Primary Stages on 19 May 1999. Directed by Harris Yulin, the cast featured T.R. Knight (Joe), Drew McVety (Ray) and Thomas Lyons (Frank).

The play was revived in London by Theatre 503 and the Young Vic in February 2005. Directed by Yael Shavit the cast featured Keith Dunphy (Jim), Michael Colgan (Frank), and Tom Vaughan Lawlor (Joe). Michael Billington noted: "As a text, it also highlights McPherson's strengths: his sense of place, eye for detail and sensitivity to Ireland's gregarious solitude."

== Plot summary ==
The play is an account of coming of age in small town Ireland, told by three young men. The central characters are Joe, the youngest, who is bored with school and looking for adventure. His brother Frank is working full-time in the family chipper (a fish and chips shop) and hatches “his great plan” to solve all the family’s troubles. Lastly, their friend Ray the debauched university lecturer who is dating their sister Carmel.

== Critical response ==
In a review of a 2016 production in Dublin, the reviewer wrote: "'This Lime Tree Bower' stands at a short 80 minutes but feels like less. In this time, the ensemble delivers a genuine and skilled performance. The performance is not groundbreaking in its originality but does provide a great sample of McPherson’s quintessential dark humour, casual fecklessness, and problematic masculinities."

== Film ==
Conor McPherson turned this play into a movie titled Saltwater which he also directed. The film, release in 2000, starred Brian Cox and was shot in Dublin. Saltwater won the CICAE award for best film at the Berlin International Film Festival.
