= The Night Alive =

The Night Alive is a 2013 stage play by Conor McPherson which won the New York Drama Critics Circle Award for Best Play 2013–14 The play premiered in London in 2013.

== Productions ==
The play premiered at the Donmar Warehouse in London, running from 13 June 2013 to 27 July 2013. It then transferred to Off-Broadway at the Atlantic Theater Company, running from 30 November 2013 (previews) to 2 February 2014. The play was directed by Conor McPherson.

It received positive reviews including from The New York Times and Five stars from Time Out. It also received Best Play nominations from the Lucille Lortel Awards, the Drama Desk Awards, and the Laurence Olivier Awards.

The play was part of the 2015 Dublin Theatre Festival and was performed at the Gaiety Theatre in Dublin.

Following the success of the play in London and New York, further productions were scheduled for Chicago (Steppenwolf Theatre Company, 2014) and Los Angeles (Geffen Playhouse, 2015).

== Original cast ==
The original cast at The Donmar in London and Off-Broadway at The Atlantic:

- Tommy — Ciarán Hinds
- Doc — Michael McElhatton
- Aimee — Caoilfhionn Dunne
- Kenneth — Brian Gleeson
- Maurice — Jim Norton

== Plot ==
The play is set in the drawing room of an Edwardian house in Dublin which is now a bedsit, inhabited by fifty-something, Tommy. He rents the room from his Uncle Maurice who lives upstairs. Tommy's friend, Doc, also sleeps in the room and helps Tommy doing odd jobs and moving things around with Tommy's van. None of these men is currently in any kind of relationship and they all scrape by from day to day amid the junk-filled squalor of the house.

One night Tommy rescues a young prostitute called Aimee from a beating on the street. He brings her home to get her cleaned up and she ends up staying. A tentative friendship develops between Tommy and Aimee and indeed between Aimee and the other men in the house over the following weeks. Trouble crashes into their lives however when Aimee's ex-boyfriend, Kenneth, comes looking for her.

== Critical reception ==
While, on the surface, the play seemed to avoid the supernatural subject matter McPherson is famed for, critics attributed much of the play's power to an underlying spiritual dimension. Ben Brantley wrote of the first London production:

"As writer and director, Mr. McPherson has planted in our minds a subliminal awareness of more things in heaven and earth than are dreamt of in any philosophy. By its end the play pulses with the possibility of redemption, if I may use a much-abused word. I do mean only the possibility; but even that nebulous hope kindles a glow, both warming and chilling, you rarely experience at the theatre."

David Cote wrote in Time Out of the production in New York:

"The beauty of McPherson’s writing is that peripheral, shimmery weirdness, the tug at your sleeve of something so otherworldly and luminous, you can’t bear to turn around and look. What’s going on? A spellbinding and absolutely gorgeous new play by one of the true poets of the theater, that’s what."
