= Come On Over (play) =

2001 play written by Conor McPherson

Come on Over is a 2001 one-act play written by Conor McPherson, the Irish playwright and film director.

== Overview ==
The play consists of two overlapping monologues given by Matthew, a former Jesuit priest and Margaret, his lover from the village he grew up in.

== Production ==
Come On Over was produced at the Gate Theatre, Dublin, Ireland, as part of a three-play trilogy. The plays, which included works by Brian Friel and Neil Jordan as well as McPherson, ran in October 2001. McPerson directed his play, which starred Jim Norton and Dearbhla Molloy.
