= Ciarán Hinds =

Irish actor (born 1953)

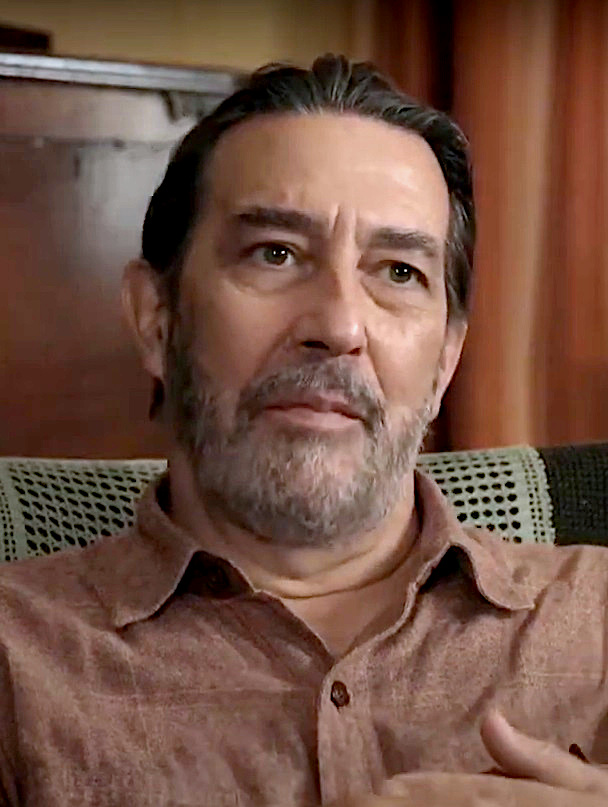
- Hinds in 2022
- Born: 9 February 1953 (age 73); Belfast, Northern Ireland
- Education: Royal Academy of Dramatic Art
- Occupation: Actor
- Years active: 1975–present
- Works: Full list
- Spouse: Hélène Patarot (m. 1987)
- Children: Aoife Hinds

Ciarán Hinds (/ˈkɪərən/ KEER-ən; born 9 February 1953) is an Irish actor. Born and raised in Belfast, Northern Ireland, Hinds is known for a range of screen and stage roles and has starred in feature films including The Cook, the Thief, His Wife & Her Lover (1989), Persuasion (1995), Oscar and Lucinda (1997), Road to Perdition (2002), The Sum of All Fears (2002), Munich (2005), Amazing Grace (2007), There Will Be Blood (2007), Miss Pettigrew Lives for a Day (2008), Harry Potter and the Deathly Hallows – Part 2 (2011), Tinker Tailor Soldier Spy (2011), Silence (2016), First Man (2018), and Belfast (2021), the last of which earned him nominations for Academy Award, BAFTA Award, and Golden Globe Award for Best Supporting Actor.

Known for his distinctively deep voice, Hinds is also known for his voice role as Grand Pabbie, the Troll King in the animated film Frozen (2013) and its sequel Frozen II (2019). He played General Zakharow in Red Sparrow (2018). He also portrayed Steppenwolf in Zack Snyder's Justice League (2017) and its 2021 director's cut.

His television roles include Julius Caesar in the series Rome, DCI James Langton in Above Suspicion, Mance Rayder in Game of Thrones, and Captain Sir John Franklin in The Terror. In addition, Hinds appeared in season 3 of Shetland (2016), produced by ITV.

As a stage actor Hinds has spent periods with the Royal Shakespeare Company and the Royal National Theatre, and six seasons with Glasgow Citizens' Theatre. Hinds has continued to work on stage throughout his career. In 2020, he was listed at number 31 on The Irish Times list of Ireland's greatest film actors.

== Early life ==
Ciarán Hinds was born on 9 February 1953 in Belfast, Northern Ireland. Raised as a Catholic in north Belfast, he was one of five children and the only son of his doctor father, Gerry, and schoolteacher and amateur actress mother, Moya.

He was an Irish dancer in his youth and was educated at Holy Family Primary School and St Malachy's College. After leaving St Malachy's he attended the College of Business Studies before enrolling as a law student at Queen's University Belfast but was soon persuaded to pursue acting and abandoned his studies at Queen's to enrol at the Royal Academy of Dramatic Art, finishing in 1975.

== Career ==
Hinds began his professional acting career at the Glasgow Citizens' Theatre in a production of Cinderella (1976). He remained a frequent performer at the Citizens' Theatre during the late 1970s and through the mid-1980s. During this same period, Hinds also performed on stage in Ireland with the Abbey Theatre, the Field Day Theatre Company, the Druid Theatre, the Lyric Players' Theatre and at the Project Arts Centre. Hinds made his feature film debut in John Boorman's Excalibur in 1981. In 1987, he was cast by Peter Brook in The Mahabharata, a six-hour theatre piece that toured the world, and he also featured in its 1989 film version. Hinds almost missed the casting call in Paris due to difficulties renewing his Irish passport. In the early 1990s, he was a member of the Royal Shakespeare Company. Hinds was featured in two notable television docudramas: Granada Television's docudrama Who Bombed Birmingham? (1990) in which Hinds portrayed Richard McIlkenny, a Belfastman falsely imprisoned for an IRA bombing; and HBO's docudrama Hostages (1993), where he portrayed Irish writer and former hostage Brian Keenan.

He appeared in the title role of the RSC's production of Richard III in 1993, directed by Sam Mendes, who turned to Hinds as a last minute replacement for an injured Simon Russell Beale. On television, he played Edward Parker-Jones in the crime drama series Prime Suspect 3 (1993), Abel Mason in Dame Catherine Cookson's The Man Who Cried (1993), Jim Browner in The Memoirs of Sherlock Holmes episode "The Cardboard Box" (1994), Fyodor Glazunov in the science fiction miniseries Cold Lazarus (1996), Edward Rochester in Charlotte Brontë's Jane Eyre (1997), and the Knight Templar Brian de Bois-Guilbert in Sir Walter Scott's Ivanhoe (1997). Hinds played Captain Frederick Wentworth in the film adaptation of Jane Austen's Persuasion (1995). In 1996, Hinds acted as a police detective in episode "Confessions" of Tales from the Crypt. Hinds gained his most popular recognition as a stage actor for his performance as Larry in the London and Broadway productions of Patrick Marber's Tony Award-nominated play Closer. In 1999, Hinds was awarded both the Theatre World Award for Best Debut in New York and the Outer Critics Circle Award for Special Achievement (Best Ensemble Cast Performance) for his work in Closer. Hinds was on stage in 2001 in The Yalta Game by Brian Friel at Dublin's Gate Theatre. He has featured in a number of made-for-television films, including a portrayal of the French existentialist Albert Camus in Broken Morning (2003) and the role of Michael Henchard in Thomas Hardy's The Mayor of Casterbridge in 2004, for which he won the award for Best Actor in a Drama Series at the 2nd Irish Film & Television Awards.

Hinds appeared as Dr Jonathan Reiss in Lara Croft Tomb Raider: The Cradle of Life, John Traynor in Veronica Guerin, both in 2003, and Firmin in the film version of Andrew Lloyd Webber's The Phantom of the Opera in 2004. Hinds also played Carl, a professional assisting a group of assassins, in Steven Spielberg's political thriller, Munich in 2005. Hinds portrayed Gaius Julius Caesar in the first season of BBC/HBO's series Rome in 2006. In 2006, he appeared in Michael Mann's film adaptation of the 80's television show, Miami Vice, and as Herod the Great in The Nativity Story. In the 2006 film Amazing Grace, Hinds portrayed Sir Banastre Tarleton, one of the chief opponents of abolition of the slave trade in Parliament. He starred alongside Nicole Kidman, Jack Black and Jennifer Jason Leigh, in a comedy-drama about family secrets and relationships in Margot at the Wedding. He also appeared in Paul Thomas Anderson directed film There Will Be Blood (2007). He appeared on Broadway in The Seafarer by Conor McPherson, which ran at the Booth Theatre from December 2007 through March 2008. In February 2009 he took the leading role of General Sergei Kotov in Burnt by the Sun by Peter Flannery at London's National Theatre. Hinds returned to the stage later in 2009 with a role in Conor McPherson's play The Birds, which opened at Dublin's Gate Theatre in September 2009. Hinds played the lead role of Bill Maplewood in Todd Solondz's dramedy Life During Wartime which premiered at the 2009 Venice Film Festival before having a general release in July 2010.

Hinds starred opposite Kelly Reilly in Above Suspicion, a TV adaptation of Lynda La Plante's detective story, which was broadcast in the United Kingdom in January 2009; he returned for the sequels The Red Dahlia (2010), Deadly Intent (2011) and Silent Scream (2012). Hinds has performed in audiobook and radio productions as well. He performed as Valmont in the BBC Radio production of Les Liaisons Dangereuses, and also narrated the Penguin Audiobook Ivanhoe. He also performed in Antony and Cleopatra and The Winter's Tale as part of The Complete Arkangel Shakespeare, an audio production of Shakespeare's plays which won the 2004 Audie Award for Best Audio Drama. He read the short story "A Painful Case" for the Caedmon Audio version of James Joyce's Dubliners.

Hinds played the role of Albus Dumbledore's brother Aberforth in Harry Potter and the Deathly Hallows – Part 2, the final film in the Harry Potter series. Also in 2011, he appeared as David Peretz in the 1997 sections of The Debt alongside Helen Mirren and Tom Wilkinson. Hinds played Roy Bland in the 2011 adaptation of the John le Carré's Tinker, Tailor, Soldier, Spy. In September 2011, Hinds returned to the Abbey Theatre in Dublin to star as Captain Jack Boyle in a revival of Seán O'Casey's Juno and the Paycock, alongside Sinéad Cusack as Juno. The production transferred to the National Theatre of Great Britain in November 2011 for a three-month run. He played "Jim" in the film The Shore (2011), written and directed by Terry George. The Shore won the Best Short Film, Live Action category at the 84th Annual Academy Awards (The Oscars) in 2012.

In 2013, he was cast as the wildling leader Mance Rayder in Season 3 of the HBO television series Game of Thrones. He reprised this role in Season 4, and in Season 5. On Broadway at the Richard Rodgers Theater in New York, he was Big Daddy to Scarlett Johansson in Cat on a Hot Tin Roof, which began previews on 18 December 2012 and opened on 17 January 2013. In the summer of 2013, he performed at the Donmar Warehouse in London in the premiere production of The Night Alive, a play by Conor McPherson, which transferred in November 2013, with Hinds in the lead role, to the Atlantic Theater Company in New York. In 2015, he was in Hamlet alongside Benedict Cumberbatch at the London Barbican, playing King Claudius. He appeared the following year as Deputy Governor Danforth in the Broadway production of Arthur Miller's play The Crucible alongside Saoirse Ronan and Ben Whishaw. In 2018 he shot the film The Thin Man which has since been retitled The Man in the Hat in France directed by Oscar-winning composer Stephen Warbeck.

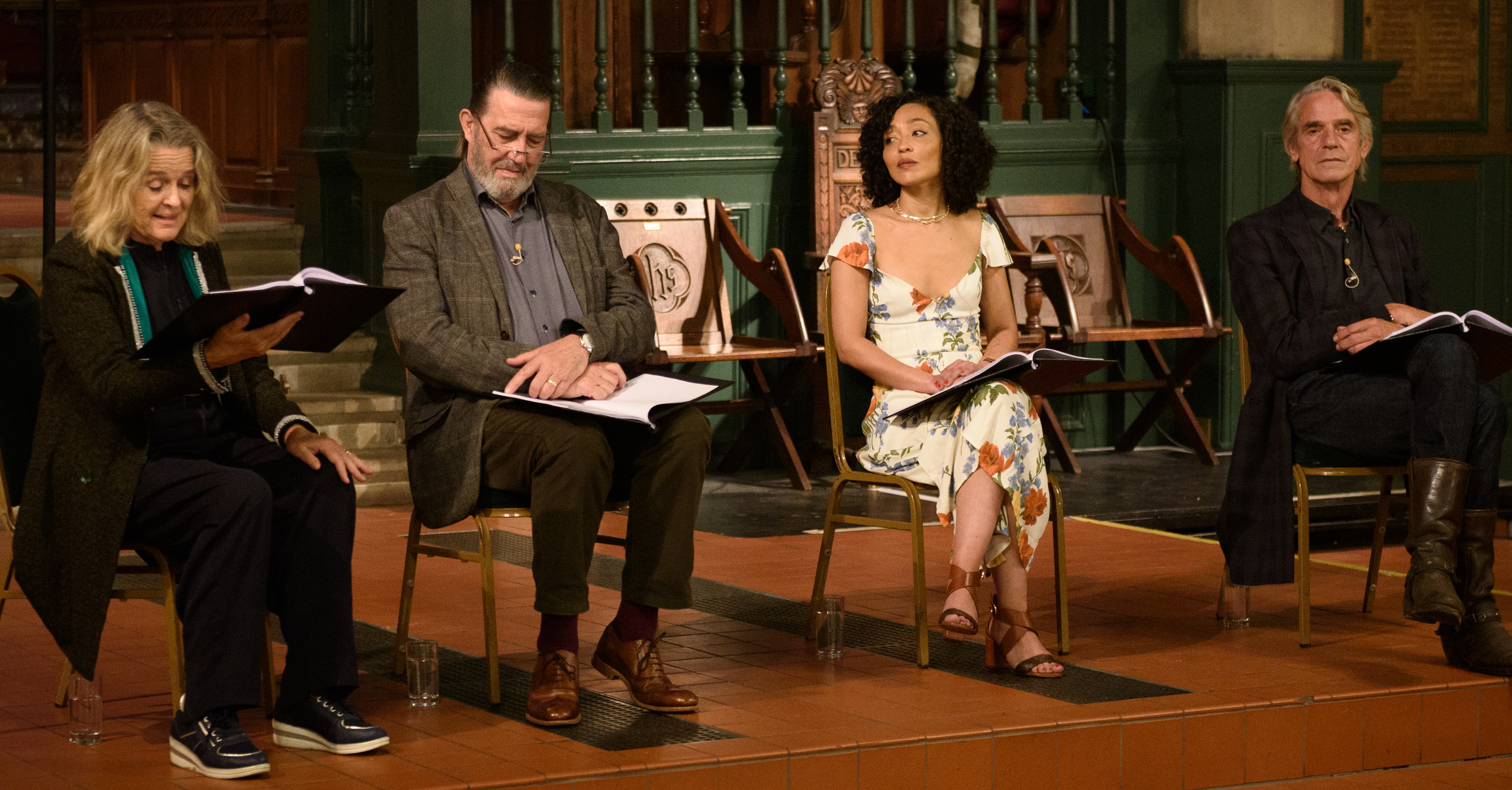
Ciarán Hinds at the WB Yeats Poetry Hour at the 2022 Chiswick Book Festival with Sinéad Cusack (left), Ruth Negga, and Jeremy Irons (right)

In 2017, Hinds portrayed the DC Comics villain Steppenwolf in the superhero film Justice League. Disappointed with the reshoots and changes made by Joss Whedon following director Zack Snyder's departure, including ones made to Steppenwolf's appearance and characterisation, Hinds publicly supported the release of Snyder's original cut of the film, calling it superior to the theatrical version. On 18 March 2021 Snyder's version, titled Zack Snyder's Justice League, was released on the WarnerMedia Entertainment streaming service HBO Max, restoring many scenes, including those of Hinds as Steppenwolf in the character's original design, which were not featured in the theatrical version.

In 2021, Hinds appeared as a drug trafficking gangster known as Eamon Cunningham, in the TV drama Kin. Hinds starred in Kenneth Branagh's 2021 film Belfast, for which Hinds received critical acclaim, won the National Board of Review for Best Supporting Actor, and was nominated for the Academy Award for Best Supporting Actor.

In August 2021, it was announced Hinds would star in the comedy-drama series The Dry, developed by Element Pictures for Britbox. In October 2021, he was cast in the thriller film In the Land of Saints and Sinners, starring Liam Neeson and directed by Robert Lorenz.

== Personal life ==
Hinds lives in Paris and London with his wife, the French-Vietnamese actress Hélène Patarot. They met in 1987 while in the cast of Peter Brook's production of The Mahabharata. Their daughter, Aoife Hinds (born 1991, in London), is also an actress and has appeared in Derry Girls, Normal People, and Hellraiser.

== Awards and nominations ==
Year	Award	Category	Work	Result	Ref
1999	Theatre World Award	Best Debut	Closer	Won	
1999	Outer Circle Critics Award	Best Ensemble Cast Performance	Closer	Won	
1999	Drama Desk Awards	Outstanding Featured Actor in a Play	Closer	Nominated	
2003	Irish Film and Television Awards	Best Supporting Actor – Film	Veronica Guerin	Nominated	
2004	Irish Film and Television Awards	Best Actor in a TV Drama	The Mayor of Casterbridge	Won	
2007	Irish Film and Television Awards	Best Actor in a Lead Role on Television	Rome	Won	
2007	Gotham Awards	Best Ensemble Performance	Margot at the Wedding	Nominated	
2009	Tribeca Film Festival	Best Actor in a Narrative Feature	The Eclipse	Won	
2010	Dublin International Film Festival	Career Achievement Award	—N/a	Won	
2010	Irish Film & Television Awards	Best Lead Actor – Film	The Eclipse	Nominated	
2010	Gotham Awards	Best Ensemble Performance	Life During Wartime	Nominated	
2012	Irish Film & Television Awards	Best Supporting Actor – Film	The Debt	Nominated	
2012	Irish Film & Television Awards	Best Lead Actor – Film	Tinker Tailor Soldier Spy	Nominated	
2012	Central Ohio Film Critics Association	Best Ensemble	Tinker Tailor Soldier Spy	Won	
2013	Irish Film & Television Awards	Best Supporting Actor – Film	The Woman in Black	Nominated	
2013	OFTA Television Awards	Best Guest Actor in a Drama Series	Game of Thrones	Nominated	
2014	Irish Film & Television Awards	Best Lead Actor – Film	The Sea	Nominated	
2014	Behind the Voice Actors Awards	Best Vocal Ensemble in a Feature Film	Frozen	Won	
2017	Irish Film & Television Awards	Best Supporting Actor – Film	Bleed for This	Nominated	
2018	Laurence Olivier Awards	Best Actor in a Musical	Girl from the North Country	Nominated	
2021	Irish Film & Television Awards	Best Lead Actor – Film	The Man in the Hat	Nominated	
2021	National Board of Review	Best Supporting Actor	Belfast	Won	
2021	Palm Springs International Film Festival	Chairman's Vanguard Award	Belfast	Won	
2021	British Independent Film Awards	Best Supporting Actor	Belfast	Nominated	
2021	Washington D.C. Area Film Critics Association	Best Supporting Actor	Belfast	Nominated	
2022	Satellite Awards	Best Supporting Actor	Belfast	Nominated	
2022	Screen Actors Guild Awards	Outstanding Performance by a Cast in a Motion Picture	Belfast	Nominated	
2022	Critics Choice Movie Awards	Best Supporting Actor	Belfast	Nominated	
2022	Critics Choice Movie Awards	Best Acting Ensemble	Belfast	Won	
2022	Hollywood Critics Association	Best Supporting Actor	Belfast	Nominated	
2022	Hollywood Critics Association	Best Ensemble Cast	Belfast	Won	
2022	Golden Globe Awards	Best Supporting Actor	Belfast	Nominated	
2022	Irish Film & Television Awards	Best Supporting Actor – Film	Belfast	Won	
2022	Irish Film & Television Awards	Actor in a Supporting Role – Drama	KIN	Won	
2022	British Academy Film Awards	Best Supporting Actor	Belfast	Nominated	
2022	Academy Awards	Best Supporting Actor	Belfast	Nominated	
2023	Irish Film & Television Awards	Best Actor in a Supporting Role - Drama	The Dry	Won	

== See also ==
- List of Irish actors
- List of Academy Award winners and nominees from Ireland
- List of actors with Academy Award nominations
