= Declan McGonagle =

Irish curator (born 1953)

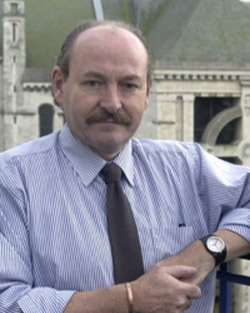
- Born: 1953 (age 72–73); Derry, Northern Ireland

Declan McGonagle is a well-known figure in Irish contemporary art, holding positions as director at the Orchard Gallery in Derry, the first director at the Irish Museum of Modern Art, and as director of the National College of Art and Design, Dublin. He writes, lectures and publishes regularly on art and museum/gallery policy issues, and curates exhibitions.

== Early life ==
McGonagle was born in Derry in 1953. He attended St Columb's College before studying Fine Art at the College of Art and Design in Belfast. In the 70's and 80's he worked as a painter and a lecturer of Art and Design at the Regional Technical College, Letterkenny, County Donegal.

== Career ==
=== Orchard Gallery ===
Derry City Council was responsible for setting up the Orchard Gallery on Orchard Street in the city of Derry, McGonagle was appointed to the post of curator in 1978 and remained there until 1984 during the height of The Troubles. He gave up painting a year after he joined the Orchard. Orchard Gallery established itself on a minimal budget, and McGonagle found that international artists were attracted by the concept of addressing the issues of communities in conflict.

In 1983, he worked briefly for the Institute of Contemporary Arts in London, while keeping close contact and transferring exhibitions to the Orchard. He returned to Orchard in 1986 to continue running the gallery for another four years. In 1987 he became the first ever arts administrator to be shortlisted for the Turner prize for his work at the Derry gallery.

=== Irish Museum of Modern Art ===
In 1990, McGonagle was appointed director of the newly established Irish Museum of Modern Art (Imma) in Dublin.

He supported the contentious decision to use the 17th century Kilmainham Hospital location, as opposed to a new purpose-built premises in the then redeveloping Dublin Docklands area. Aidan Dunne of the Irish Times notes that at Imma "over the years... the lack of a large exhibition space has on occasion been a drawback." Hugh Linehan, arts and culture editor at The Irish Times, commented in 2021 that McGonagle "...fatefully insisted it should be located in the Royal Hospital", and that "Imma has struggled to define itself against the backdrop of a beautiful but not very well-suited exhibition space."

McGonagle developed a strategy for working with contemporary artists to collect "for the future", he proposed to give educational and community-related programmes equal importance to the curatorial work. The inaugural exhibition included works of Picasso, Mondrian, Gris, Braque, Giacometti and Miró.

In relation to Imma's collection, McGonagle is quoted as saying "most of what we buy is Irish," in 1993, "but I'm not operating a quota system. Part of that has to do with the practical dimension of how often you see international work. £100,000 is actually quite a modest sum, although it's a lot in Irish terms, so it's only right that we redistribute that wealth back into the system [...] " In 1994 the gallery acquired a semi-permanent Lawrence Weiner work for £20,000.

During his ten-year appointment as director at the Irish Museum of Modern Art, McGonagle saw the conversion of the property's stables into accommodation and studio spaces, the (then) part-derelict Deputy Master's House restored as a specialist exhibition space, and the 48 acres of the grounds dotted with contemporary sculptures.

In 1996, Irish abstract artist Gerald Davis wrote an article in The Irish Times, criticising McGonagle's vision for Imma and calling for more historical and contemporary Irish artists to be represented at the gallery. He noted that "the Irish Museum of Modern [sic] largely ignores the contribution made by our own artists of the last 50 years and does not regularly make a cross-section of their work accessible to the public. The current policy of promoting that which is internationally fashionable is, in essence, provincial."

The gallery's highest footfall to date was recorded in 1997 at 350,000, as a result of the popular Andy Warhol exhibition. In 1999, Imma administered the first Nissan Millenium Art Project award of £40,000 for a temporary artwork. The award was granted to Dorothy Cross for her 'Ghost Ship' project.

=== CityArts ===
City Arts Centre, a community arts organisation founded in 1973, did not receiving Arts Council funding in 2001. McGonagle was then hired as director and under his leadership the Centre began a process of cessation, starting with the closure of the Centre for 2 years with all staff made redundant and all activities stopped. City Councilor Mannix Flynn, on the closure of the City Arts Centre, said that “Dublin lost an arts community down there, the community lost an arts centre, lost employment”. McGonagle launched a 'Civil Arts Inquiry' (a two year series of "conferences and recorded public debates") meanwhile earning €50,000 per year. The 'Inquiry' had skeptics, dismissing it for not engaging with the art community and as a profit-driven waste of time, without producing any results. Under McGonagle the Centre's building and property on Moss Street in central Dublin was sold in 2003 for more than €4.2 million, making it the richest arts organisation in Ireland at the time.

After the sale, the City Arts Centre spent the next few years in a basement office and in 2007 bought a smaller building on Bachelor's Walk. However, it needed repairs and only reopened in 2010 (as CityArts). At this time the organisation had spent nearly all of its savings between operational costs, archiving, the 'Civil Arts Inquiry', redundancy packages, and the new building with its renovations. In 2012 CityArts voluntarily liquidated, with the new building becoming the property of the Dublin City Council. As of 2024 the old Moss Street building has remained unused and undeveloped.

=== NCAD ===
In 2008 McGonagle took up the post as Director of the National College of Art and Design, Dublin (NCAD). Under his governance, NCAD began an academic alliance in 2010 with UCD, and in 2012, McGonagle announced that the college was in talks regarding a possible merger with University College Dublin. McGonagle assured staff and students that a campus move to Belfield was not on the agenda. McGonagle resigned from NCAD in 2015 amidst controversy.

=== Other projects ===
Aside from his 1983 stint at Institute of Contemporary Arts, in 1993 McGonagle sat on a subcommittee of the Cultural Relations Committee (CRC) to reinstate the Irish Pavilion at the Venice Biennale. The exhibition in 1993 saw Dorothy Cross and Willie Doherty represent Ireland. It was the first time Ireland had participated in the event since 1962. Also that year, McGonagle was a member of the Turner Prize jury. From 2004 to 2008, McGonagle was the first director of a new research centre in the School of Art and Design at the Ulster University, Belfast.

== Controversy ==
=== Imma ===
In February 2000 the Minister for Arts, Heritage, Gaeltacht and the Islands, Síle de Valera, appointed Marie Donnelly, a leading socialite and charity fundraiser, to chair a new board at Imma. Shortly thereafter "she advised the then director, Declan McGonagle, that she was advertising his post." But because "after his first five years in the position, his contract had been renewed without the post being publicly advertised" McGonagle took legal action. In November 2000 Board members were informed that lawyers for McGonagle were applying to the High Court for an injunction restraining Imma from publicly advertising the director's position.

The issue took on larger proportions as "...public perception was that [Donnelly] was somehow against community arts and in favour of international blockbuster exhibitions, that she was a wealthy socialite out to bring down a man of the people." During this time there was public support for McGonagle and a high profile threats were made to withdraw collections and funding from the gallery should the director lose his position. The businessman and art collector Gordon Lambert claimed he intended to reassess his relationship with Imma.

However, "after four months he won a renewal of his contract, but he then resigned" abruptly, but with considerable compensation. He was able to negotiate a severance package with government mediator Paddy Teehan and was allegedly awarded €250,000 in the settlement. Other reports say he was "awarded five years’ salary (€370,000) five years’ pension contributions (€31,000), five years’ housing subsidy (€90,000) and a car."

=== NCAD ===
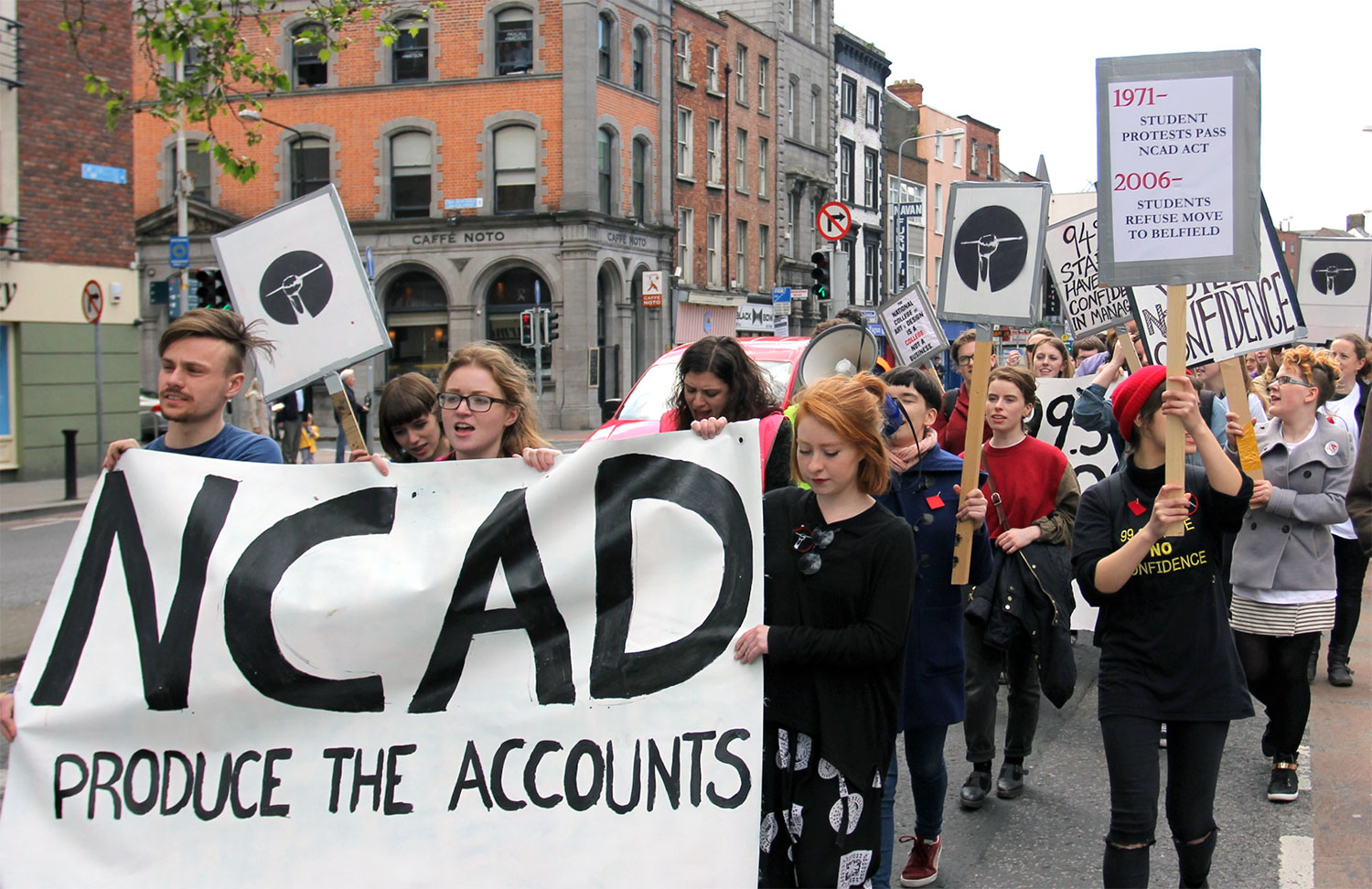
Student protest against McGonagle, March 2015

McGonagle resigned from NCAD in 2015, a year in which "questions about accounting practices, a drastic increase in student numbers, the introduction of student charges, and questionable revenue management" emerged.

In 2015, after numerous delays in producing its accounts over the course of 8 years, NCAD's state funding was put in question during a Committee of Public Accounts (a standing committee of the Irish parliament). Early in 2015, the Comptroller and Auditor General told the Public Accounts Committee that accounting practices in NCAD were "not fit for purpose"", and Labour TD Robert Dowds said it was "one of the most scandalous situations with which the committee has been presented".

There were related student protests and a sit-in in March 2015, followed by a near unanimous SIPTU vote at an Emergency General Meeting on April 15, 2015 of 'no confidence' in the senior management:

"At an Emergency General Meeting of SIPTU members in NCAD, held on April 15, a motion was passed that stated: “Following the recent appearance of NCAD before the Public Accounts Committee and in support of the action of students, SIPTU members have expressed no confidence in the Senior Management Team of NCAD to plan for the long term fiscal and academic future of the college. We will as requested by our members bring this to the attention of the Department of Education and the HEA.”"

On 11 September 2015 McGonagle announced his intention to retire as director of the National College of Art and Design at the end of the year citing "personal reasons".

== Bibliography ==
- McGonagle, Declan. A shout in the street : collective histories of Northern Irish art. Belfast: Golden Thread Gallery, 2008. ISBN 9780955746925
- Wyndham, Andrew H. Re-imagining Ireland. Charlottesville: University of Virginia Press, 2006. ISBN 9780813925448
- Seawright, Paul. Paul Seawright. Salamanca: Ediciones Universidad de Salamanca, 2000. ISBN 9788478009305
- McGonagle, Declan, Fintan Toole, and Kim Levin. Irish art now : from the poetic to the political. London New York: Merrell Holberton Independent Curators International, in association with the Irish Museum of Modern Art, Dublin, 1999. ISBN 9781858940892
- Warhol, Andy. After the party : Andy Warhol works, 1956-1986. Dublin London: Irish Museum of Modern Art Lund Humphries distributor, 1997. ISBN 9780853317166
- From beyond the Pale : art and artists at the edge of consensus. Dublin: Irish Museum of Modern Art, 1994. ISBN 9781873654217
- Inheritance and transformation. Dublin, Ireland: Irish Museum of Modern Art, 1991. ISBN 9781873654002
- Levine, Les. Blame God : billboard projects. London: ICA in association with the Artangel Trust and the Orchard Gallery Derry, 1985. ISBN 9780905263601
