= Come Over =

Come Over may refer to:

- "Come Over" (Faith Evans song), 1996
- "Come Over" (Aaliyah song), 2003
- "Come Over" (Estelle song), 2008
- "Come Over" (Kenny Chesney song), 2012
- "Come Over" (Clean Bandit song), 2014
- "Come Over", a 2001 song by Jennifer Lopez from J.Lo
- "Come Over", a 2018 song by the Internet from Hive Mind
- "Come Over", a 2022 song by Noah Kahan from Stick Season
- "Come Over", a 2023 song by Carly Rae Jepsen from The Loveliest Time
- "Do You Wanna Come Over?", 2016 song by Britney Spears
- Come Over (Rudimental song) 2020
- Come Over (Le Sserafim song), 2025
- Come Over (BTS song), 2026

== See also ==
- Come On Over (disambiguation)
