= City Arts Centre, Dublin =

Irish community arts organisation

City Arts Centre
- Formation: 1973
- Dissolved: 2012
- Purpose: Community arts centre in inner city Dublin, gallery, residencies, studios, music programmes

City Arts Centre (CityArts) was a community arts organisation in central Dublin founded in 1973 and liquidated in 2012.

== History ==
=== Origins ===
Originally called the Grapevine Arts Centre, what became the City Arts Centre occupied a number of premises in the centre of Dublin, beginning at Mary Street and then North Great Georges Street, North Frederick Street, and Moss Street, before purchasing a location at Bachelor's Walk in 2010. The organisation grew from a need by a group of teenagers in what has been called Dublin's culturally bleak mid-20th century, with particular issues for those from a working-class background, which was the case for most of the Grapevine founders. This is also the reason why the location of the centre was the unfashionable Northside inner city. The three main initiators of the project were Jackie Aherne, Anto Fahy and Sandy Fitzgerald.

=== Community arts ===
As the 1970s progressed, the organisation became more culturally politicised, linking in with the radical community arts movement in the UK. This collaboration resulted in a wider worldview and a move to work for a different perspective on culture, one that recognised differences and the rights of people with regard to cultural equality. Linking with similar projects that had emerged (notably City Workshop and Moving Theatre in Dublin and Neighbourhood Open Workshops in Belfast) in Ireland by the early 1980s, the community arts movement grew to be a force for change, resulting in new policies and perspectives that sought to challenge cultural orthodoxy. In 1984, the representative group CAFE (Creative Activity For Everyone) was formed, with Grapevine as a founding member.

City Arts Centre neon sign at Moss St. location.

Grapevine's artistic programme grew alongside its philosophical awareness and was diverse and multifaceted, taking place within the centre, around the suburbs of Dublin and throughout Ireland. Examples of this diversity include its street theatre programme, directed by Thom McGinty (later to become the Diceman), hair cutting, street fashion design studio, audio art, street events, gigs and random acts of fun in public places. They had an innovative visual arts programme directed for a while by artist John Carson, later of Artangel in the UK. This included early shows by John Kindness amongst others including an exhibition of drawings from the survivors of Hiroshima, organised in association with a young U2.

=== Name change ===
The relationship with U2 continued into the centre's next phase when, in 1988, there was a name change from Grapevine Arts Centre to City Arts Centre when the organisation occupied a warehouse building on Moss Street near Tara Street Station, then the largest centre of its kind in Ireland. U2 provided fully equipped rehearsal spaces for young bands in the basement. Over this was a cafe and theatre space initially run by Declan Gorman and above that a gallery space initially run by Tommy Weir. Sandy Fitzgerald continued as Director through to 2001. The Arts Council never fully backed the centre, favouring the Project Arts Centre.

The Centre actually owned the Moss Street building, having bought it in a then run-down area. However, the property became rather valuable. There was an opportunity to create a large civic project when a partnership between City Quay School to the rear of the centre and a community hall adjacent to the centre were brought into a scheme for an innovative socio/cultural project at the entrance to the docklands, then at the beginning of its transformation. The scheme needed a piece of vacant land that linked all the properties but the Dublin Dockland Development Authority rejected the idea, although both Dublin City Council and The Arts Council, plus all the local elected representatives, supported the project. As a result, City Arts Centre became an anomaly within the dockland development. Sandy Fitzgerald stepped down as director of the centre in 2000, after 27 years. City Arts did not receive Arts Council funding in 2001.

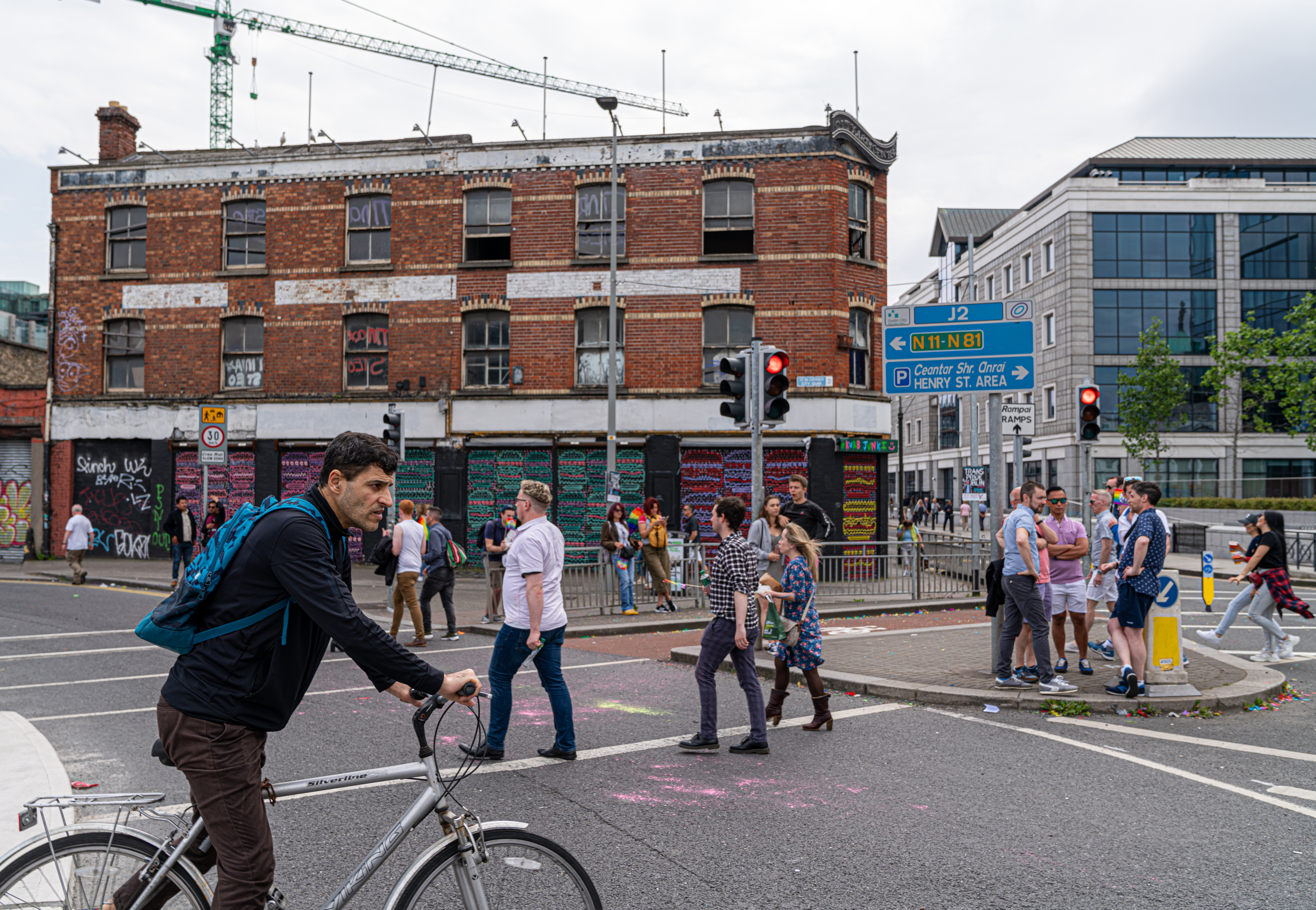
The derelict City Arts Centre on the corner of Moss Street and City Quay, Dublin

=== Cessation of activity ===
Declan McGonagle was hired as director, and under his leadership the centre began a process of cessation, starting with its closure for 2 years, with all staff made redundant and all activities stopped. City Councilor Mannix Flynn, on the closure of the City Arts Centre, said that “Dublin lost an arts community down there, the community lost an arts centre, lost employment”. McGonagle launched a 'Civil Arts Inquiry' (a two-year series of "conferences and recorded public debates") meanwhile earning €50,000 per year. The 'Inquiry' had skeptics, dismissing it for not engaging with the art community and as a profit-driven waste of time, without producing any results.

The centre's building and property on Moss St in central Dublin was sold in 2003 for more than €4.2 million, making it the richest arts organisation in Ireland at the time. After the sale, the City Arts Centre spent the next few years in a basement office and in 2007 bought a smaller building on Bachelor's Walk. However, it needed repairs and only reopened in 2010 (as CityArts). At this time the organisation had spent nearly all of its savings on operational costs, archiving, the 'Civil Arts Inquiry', redundancy packages, and the new building with renovations. In 2012 CityArts voluntarily liquidated, with the new building becoming the property of Dublin City Council. As of 2021, the Moss Street building remained unused and undeveloped, but after 18 years of inactivity it went up for sale in April 2021 for €35 million. In 2022, Dublin City Council refused planning permission for a 24-storey office building on the site, this decision was upheld by An Bord Pleanála on appeal and as of 2024 the site remains derelict.

In 2004 the book 'An Outburst of Frankness: Community Arts In Ireland - A Reader' was published by Tasc at New Island. This book, edited by Sandy Fitzgerald, goes into some detail about the history of community arts in Ireland, backed up by essays on the theory and practice of this movement.

== Timeline ==
Throughout the 25-year life of City Arts, there were a number of varied and quite popular events, some of which gained press, popular and political attention.

- 1973 - Founded
- 1978/79 - Took an active part in the anti-nuclear protests at this time, contributing to the Carnsore Point anti-nuclear festivals with children's theatre, music, dance and public 'happenings'. Also organised an anti-nuclear exhibition and public debates in their Dublin centre.
- 1982 - Took part and photographed the nuclear disarmament march.
- 1985 - Grapevine Arts Centre reforms as City Arts Centre.
- 1989 - Street Carnival.
- 1989 - Official opening of Moss Street City Arts Building. Charles Haughey attends and is greeted by Una Sealy.
- 1990 - City Quay School
- 1995 - "Another parade which involved many local children was the South Docks Festival Parade followed by the Fair in the Square in July. Also in the South Docks Festival (organised by City Arts Centre and St Andrews Resource Centre) was Children's Day held in and around Pearse Square."
- 2001 - All staff were made redundant by Declan McGonagle.
- 2003 - Docks location sold for €4.2 million.
- 2007 - Bought new location on Bachelor's Walk.
- 2012 - Voluntarily goes into liquidation.
