= Conor McPherson =

Irish playwright, screenwriter, and director

- Born: 6 August 1971 (age 55); Dublin, Ireland
- Occupations: Playwright, screenwriter, director

Conor McPherson (born 6 August 1971) is an Irish playwright, screenwriter, and director of stage and film. In recognition of his contribution to world theatre, McPherson was awarded an honorary doctorate of literature in June 2013 by University College Dublin.

== Early life and education ==
Conor McPherson was born on 6 August 1971 in Dublin.

He went to secondary school at Chanel College, Coolock, Dublin. He was educated at University College Dublin and began writing his first plays there as a member of UCD Dramsoc, the college's dramatic society, and went on to found Fly by Night Theatre Company which produced several of his plays. He is considered one of the best contemporary Irish playwrights; his plays have attracted good reviews, and have been performed internationally (notably in the West End and on Broadway).

== Career ==
McPherson's play The Weir opened at the Royal Court before transferring to the West End and Broadway. It won the Laurence Olivier Award for Best Play for 1999 1999 Laurence Olivier Awards

In the same year he was one of the recipients of the V Europe Prize Theatrical Realities awarded to the Royal Court Theatre (with Sarah Kane, Mark Ravenhill, Jez Butterworth, Martin McDonagh).

His 2001 play, Port Authority tells of three interwoven lives. The play was first produced by the Gate Theatre of Dublin but premiered at the New Ambassadors Theatre in London in February 2001, before moving to the Gate Theatre in April of that year. The production was directed by McPherson himself. New York's Atlantic Theater Company staged a production of the play in the spring of 2008, starring Brian d'Arcy James, and Tony Award winners John Gallagher Jr. and Jim Norton.

McPherson also directed his play, Dublin Carol, at the Atlantic Theater Company, New York, in 2003.

His 2004 play Shining City opened at the Royal Court and prompted The Daily Telegraph to describe him as "the finest dramatist of his generation". It subsequently opened on Broadway in 2006 and was nominated for two Tony Awards, including Best Play.

In September 2006, to great critical acclaim, McPherson made his National Theatre debut as both author and director with The Seafarer at the Cottesloe auditorium, starring Karl Johnson and Jim Norton, with Ron Cook as their poker-playing, Mephistophelean guest. Norton won an Olivier Award for his performance, while McPherson was nominated for both the Olivier and Evening Standard Awards for Best Play. In October 2007 The Seafarer opened on Broadway, keeping with it most of its creative team, including McPherson as director and both Jim Norton and Conleth Hill in their respective roles, with David Morse taking over as Sharky, and Ciarán Hinds portraying Mr. Lockhart. The production on Broadway received some positive reviews including such statements as "McPherson is quite possibly the finest playwright of his generation" from Ben Brantley at The New York Times and "Succinct, startling and eerie, and the funniest McPherson play to date" from The Observer.

McPherson wrote and directed a stage adaptation of Daphne du Maurier's story The Birds, which opened in September 2009 at the Gate Theatre in Dublin.

In 2011 the National Theatre London premiered his play The Veil at the Lyttleton. Described by The Times as "a cracking fireside tale of haunting and decay" it is set in 1822 and marked McPherson's first foray into period drama. This vein continued with a striking new translation of August Strindberg's The Dance of Death premiered at the Trafalgar Studios in London at the end of 2012. His version was described as "a profoundly seminal work" by The Guardian which also managed, The Times said, to be "Shockingly funny".

The Donmar Warehouse mounted a season of McPherson's work in 2013 with a revival of The Weir and the world premiere of The Night Alive. The Weir was hailed once again as "A modern classic" by The Daily Telegraph and "A contemporary classic" by The Guardian while The Night Alive was nominated for the Laurence Olivier Award for Best Play and well-reviewed by critics. The Night Alive transferred to the Atlantic Theatre New York, where it was awarded the New York Drama Critics Circle Award for Best Play 2014, and also received Best Play nominations from the Drama Desk and Lucille Lortell Awards

McPherson's first musical, Girl from the North Country (where the dramatic action is supported by 20 songs by Bob Dylan), opened at London's The Old Vic on 26 July 2017. The play is set in a boarding house in 1934 in Duluth, Minnesota, the birthplace of Dylan. The project began when Dylan's office approached McPherson and suggested creating a play using Dylan's songs. The drama received favourable reviews.

=== Screenplays ===
The film of McPherson's first screenplay, I Went Down, was critically acclaimed and a great commercial success. His first feature film as a director, Saltwater, won the CICAE award for Best Film at the Berlin Film Festival. His second feature film was The Actors, which he wrote and directed.

He is the director and co-writer of The Eclipse, a film which had its world premiere at the 2009 Tribeca Film Festival. It was picked up for distribution by Magnolia Pictures and was released in US cinemas in spring 2010. The film subsequently won the Méliès d'Argent for Best European Film at Sitges Film Festival in Spain, a horror and fantasy genre festival. At The 2010 Irish Film and Television Awards, The Eclipse won the awards for Best Film and Best Screenplay. Ciarán Hinds won the Best Actor Award at the Tribeca Film Festival for his portrayal of Michael Farr.

In 2013, he wrote the last episode of Quirke. In 2020, he co-wrote the feature film adaptation of the Artemis Fowl books by Eoin Colfer. In response to the COVID-19 pandemic, it was released digitally worldwide on Disney+ on 12 June 2020. In November 2026, it was revealed that McPherson had co-written the film Jack of Spades with Joel and Ethan Coen and Eleanor Catton.

== Influences ==
McPherson has cited James Joyce and Stanley Kubrick as two of his "heroes".

== Recognition and awards ==
In recognition of his contribution to world theatre, McPherson was awarded an honorary doctorate of literature in June 2013 by University College Dublin.

Theatre-related awards won by McPherson include:

- Europe Prize Theatrical Realities (with the Royal Court Theatre)
- Stewart Parker Award The Good Thief
- Meyer-Whitworth Award This Lime Tree Bower
- Guinness/Royal National Theatre Ingenuity Award This Lime Tree Bower
- Pearson TV Writer in Residence Award This Lime Tree Bower
- Evening Standard Award The Weir
- George Devine Award The Weir
- Critics' Circle Theatre Award The Weir
- Laurence Olivier Award The Weir
- Tony Award nomination for Best Play Shining City
- Tony Award nominations for Best Play and Best Director The Seafarer
- Laurence Olivier and Evening Standard nominations for Best Play The Seafarer
- Manchester Evening News Award Best Touring Production The Seafarer
- Laurence Olivier Award nomination Best Play "The Night Alive"
- New York Drama Critics Circle Award Best Play "The Night Alive"
- Lucille Lortel Award Best Play nomination "The Night Alive"
- Drama Desk Award Best Play nomination "The Night Alive"
- Laurence Olivier Award nomination Best Musical "Girl from the North Country (musical)"
- Tony Award nomination for Best Direction of a Musical and Best Book of a Musical Girl from the North Country

== Works ==
=== Plays ===
- Rum and Vodka (1992)
- The Good Thief (1994)
- This Lime Tree Bower (1995)
- St. Nicholas (1997)
- The Weir (1997)
- Dublin Carol (2000)
- Port Authority (2001)
- Come on Over (2001)
- Shining City (2004)
- The Seafarer (2006)
- The Birds (adaptation) (2009)
- The Veil (2011)
- The Dance Of Death (adaptation) (2012)
- The Night Alive (2013)
- The Nest (adaptation) (2016).
- Girl from the North Country (2017)
- Uncle Vanya (adaptation) (2020)
- Cold War (2023)
- The Brightening Air (2025)
- The Hunger Games: On Stage (2025)

=== Directing credits ===
- Poor Beast in the Rain (2005)

=== Filmography ===
Film

Year	Title	Director	Writer
1997	I Went Down	No	Yes
2000	Saltwater	Yes	Yes
2000	Endgame	Yes	No
2003	The Actors	Yes	Yes
2009	The Eclipse	Yes	Yes
2020	Artemis Fowl	No	Yes
2027	Jack of Spades	No	Yes
TBA	Walk the Blue Fields	No	Yes

Television

Year	Title	Writer	Executive Producer	Notes
2014	Quirke	Yes	No	Episode "Elegy for April"
2017	Paula	Yes	Yes	3 episodes

Actor

Year	Title	Role	Notes
1997	I Went Down	Loser in nightclub	
2000	Paths to Freedom	Video shop assistant	"Episode 4"
2002	Fergus's Wedding	Dermot	"Episode 1"
2004	Rory O'Shea Was Here	Job applicant	
