= Above Suspicion (TV series) =

- Genre: Crime drama
- Written by: Lynda La Plante
- Directed by: Christopher Menaul; Gillies MacKinnon
- Starring: Kelly Reilly; Ciarán Hinds; Shaun Dingwall; Celyn Jones; Michelle Holmes; Amanda Lawrence; Ray Fearon
- Composer: Simon Lacey
- Country of origin: United Kingdom
- Original language: English
- No. of series: 4
- No. of episodes: 11

Production
- Executive producers: Liz Thorburn; Lynda La Plante
- Producers: Lynda La Plante; Jolyon Symonds; Chris Clough; Hugh Warren; Cherry Gould
- Running time: 90 mins. (Series 1, w/advertisements); 60 mins. (Series 2-4, w/advertisements)
- Production company: La Plante Productions

Original release
- Network: ITV
- Release: 4 January 2009 – 23 January 2012

Above Suspicion is a British crime drama based on the series of Anna Travis novels written by Lynda La Plante. The series stars Kelly Reilly and Ciarán Hinds as the protagonists Anna Travis and James Langton. Four series were broadcast over a total of four years on ITV. The first episode was broadcast on 4 January 2009, and the final episode on 23 January 2012. The first three series all aired on consecutive nights; whereas the fourth series aired in a more traditional weekly format.

== Plot ==
Above Suspicion follows the work of D.C. Anna Travis, a rookie detective determined to prove herself in the male-dominated police department by solving a trail of gruesome murders left by an unknown serial killer. Reilly said of the part; "Well, she's not a political character like Jane Tennison, she's not fighting her ground and it's almost like she just doesn't care. She has an innocense… she wears those skirts and those heels, and while I don't think she uses her femininity or anything like that, she just doesn't hide it. There's a dilemma for the audience, because normally your prejudices would invite you to dismiss a woman like her who seems a bit awkward and wears tight skirts. But she brings something fresh in among those hackneyed male detectives."

== Cast ==
- Kelly Reilly as D.C./D.S./D.I. Anna Travis
- Ciarán Hinds as D.C.I./D.C.S. James Langton
- Shaun Dingwall as D.I./D.C.I. Mike Lewis
- Daniel Catagirone as D.S. Paul Baroilli (Series 1)
- Celyn Jones as D.S. Paul Barolli (Series 2–4)
- Michelle Holmes as D.C. Barbara Maddox
- Amanda Lawrence as D.C. Joan Faulkland
- Nadia Cameron-Blakey as Commander Jane Leigh (Series 1–2)
- Martin Herdman as D.C.I. Elliot Hudson (Series 1)
- Stuart Organ as D.C.I. Bill Morgan (Series 2)
- Ray Fearon as D.C.I./Commander Sam Power (Series 3–4)

== Episode list ==
=== Series 1 (2009) ===
Guest cast in this series include Jason Durr as Alan Daniels; Emma Pollard as Melissa Stephens; and Malcolm Storry as John McDowell. The Daily Telegraph described the series as "Lynda La Plante's younger, sassier successor to Prime Suspect."

Episode	Title	Written by	Directed by	Original release date	Viewers (millions)
1	"Above Suspicion: Part 1"	Lynda La Plante	Christopher Menaul	4 January 2009	6.80
Anna is assigned to her first homicide case, a string of grisly murders that have gone unsolved for the past eight years. The discovery of a new victim, who doesn't fit the usual profile of prostitute or drug user, causes concern that the killer may be indiscriminately targeting his victims. Eager to prove herself, Anna uncovers a vital piece of evidence linking one man to all the killings. But things get complicated when she finds herself attracted to the prime suspect.
2	"Above Suspicion: Part 2"	Lynda La Plante	Christopher Menaul	5 January 2009	7.30
Langton allows Anna to spend an evening at the ballet with the prime suspect, a handsome actor on the brink of stardom. A discovery at the place where one of the victims lived helps Anna set a trap. Meanwhile, sparks fly between Anna and Langton.

=== Series 2 (2010) ===
Guest cast in this series include Ty Glaser as Louise Pennel; Edward MacLiam as Richard Reynolds; Sylvia Syms as Mrs. Hedges; and Simon Williams as Charles Wickenham. This series was partly based on a true story, known as the Black Dahlia murder. The series was reviewed favourably by The Daily Telegraph, with a request for "more please."

Episode	Title	Written by	Directed by	Original release date	Viewers (millions)
1	"The Red Dahlia: Part 1"	Lynda La Plante	Gillies Mackinnon	4 January 2010	7.90
A young girl's body is dumped, horrifically mutilated and drained of blood. Her death is an ominous mirror image of an unsolved 1940s case in Los Angeles known as "The Black Dahlia". Anna must race against time to catch the copycat killer, dubbed "The Red Dahlia" from the flower his victim wore in her hair.
2	"The Red Dahlia: Part 2"	Lynda La Plante	Gillies Mackinnon	5 January 2010	7.54
The team receive a letter which claims that another victim will die if the killer is not caught in time. Meanwhile, Anna interviews another woman who answered the same advertisement as the first victim. However, it's not long before a second victim is discovered, and Langton is angry when despite pressing for a veto on information given to the press, the story breaks anyway.
3	"The Red Dahlia: Part 3"	Lynda La Plante	Gillies Mackinnon	6 January 2010	7.87
Langton discovers that Wickenham performed an abortion on his youngest daughter, having possibly been the father of her child. His family close ranks, but Anna discovers some illicit photos which threaten to break them apart. When the murderer is finally cornered and exposed, he manages to escape, but is captured and killed by the family housekeeper.

=== Series 3 (2011) ===
Guest cast in this series include Robbie Gee as Silas Roach, Andrew Woodall as David Rushton, Julian Sands as Damian Nolan, and Richard Brake as Marshall. The first episode opened with 5.495 million viewers on ITV, a 19.5% share, with another 326,000 on ITV HD. It was narrowly beaten by BBC One's new series of Silent Witness which, with 5.877 million viewers, had a 20.9% share of the 9-10pm audience.

Episode	Title	Written by	Directed by	Original release date	Viewers (millions)
1	"Deadly Intent: Part 1"	Noel Farragher	Gillies Mackinnon	3 January 2011	7.02
When a man brutally murders the surgeon who has just changed his face, the team find themselves in the middle of a double murder investigation as they also investigate the shooting of a retired police officer, known by Langton at a drug dealer's den on a seedy estate, which soon links into one of the FBI Ten Most Wanted Fugitives, a drug dealer who disappeared over ten years ago.
2	"Deadly Intent: Part 2"	Noel Farragher	Gillies Mackinnon	4 January 2011	5.84
Whilst Roache admits to shooting Frank in a panic, he denies killing Danny. Middle-class drop-out and user Julian D'Anton's prints are on Danny's car, though Langton considers him too small-time to be a murderer. From a photograph, Anna identifies Julia's ex-husband Collingwood as an international criminal and asks Sam Power to contact the FBI for details of his crimes in America.
3	"Deadly Intent: Part 3"	Noel Farragher	Gillies Mackinnon	5 January 2011	5.84
A fraud squad inspector visits Langton, to discover the whereabouts of Julius, but this proves to be Fitzpatrick in disguise, who stole all the Drop Dead after finding them in Danny's car. Fitzpatrick retrieves his haul after killing Julius's wife, but a vital clue is provided when DNA matching that found at the crack den matches that at Helga's farmhouse and she admits to sheltering Fitzpatrick on his return to England after his operation in Mexico.

=== Series 4 (2012) ===
Part of Silent Scream was filmed in Lexham Mews, W8. Joanna Vanderham guest stars as Amanda Delaney.

Episode	Title	Written by	Directed by	Original release date	Viewers (millions)
1	"Silent Scream: Part 1"	Lynda La Plante	Catherine Moorshead	9 January 2012	6.95
Angered at being passed over for promotion to commander in favour of the younger, less experienced Sam Power, Langton heads the investigation into the murder of temperamental, promiscuous film star Amanda Delaney, who was seemingly about to embark on tell-tale memoirs. Langton and Travis are interested in a crucifix found on the corpse which did not belong to the victim.
2	"Silent Scream: Part 2"	Lynda La Plante	Catherine Moorshead	16 January 2012	6.32
After interviewing Josh Lyons, who was going to publish Amanda's scandalous memoir, Anna convinces Langton she did not ruin his promotion chances. The police also pull in Helena Mitchell, wife of another of Amanda's lovers, who visited her to ask her to end the affair, but left while she was still alive. She does however report seeing a man at the flat, and then, another corpse is found.
3	"Silent Scream: Part 3"	Lynda La Plante	Catherine Moorshead	23 January 2012	6.39
After the body of Felicity Turner, another of Amanda's old flatmates, is dragged from the river, the remaining college contemporary, Jeanie Bale, is brought in. She admits to having Amanda's diary, which she was planning to sell to Mr Delaney for five thousand pounds. The diary also reveals that Lester James, the youngest of the three brothers who acted as Amanda's drivers, was also her lover and pusher.
