= The Seafarer (play) =

Play by Conor McPherson

- Original language: English
- Written by: Conor McPherson
- Characters: Sharky; Richard; Ivan; Mr Lockhart; Nicky
- Genre: Black comedy
- Setting: A house in Baldoyle, Dublin

Premiere
- Date: September 2006
- Place: National Theatre, London

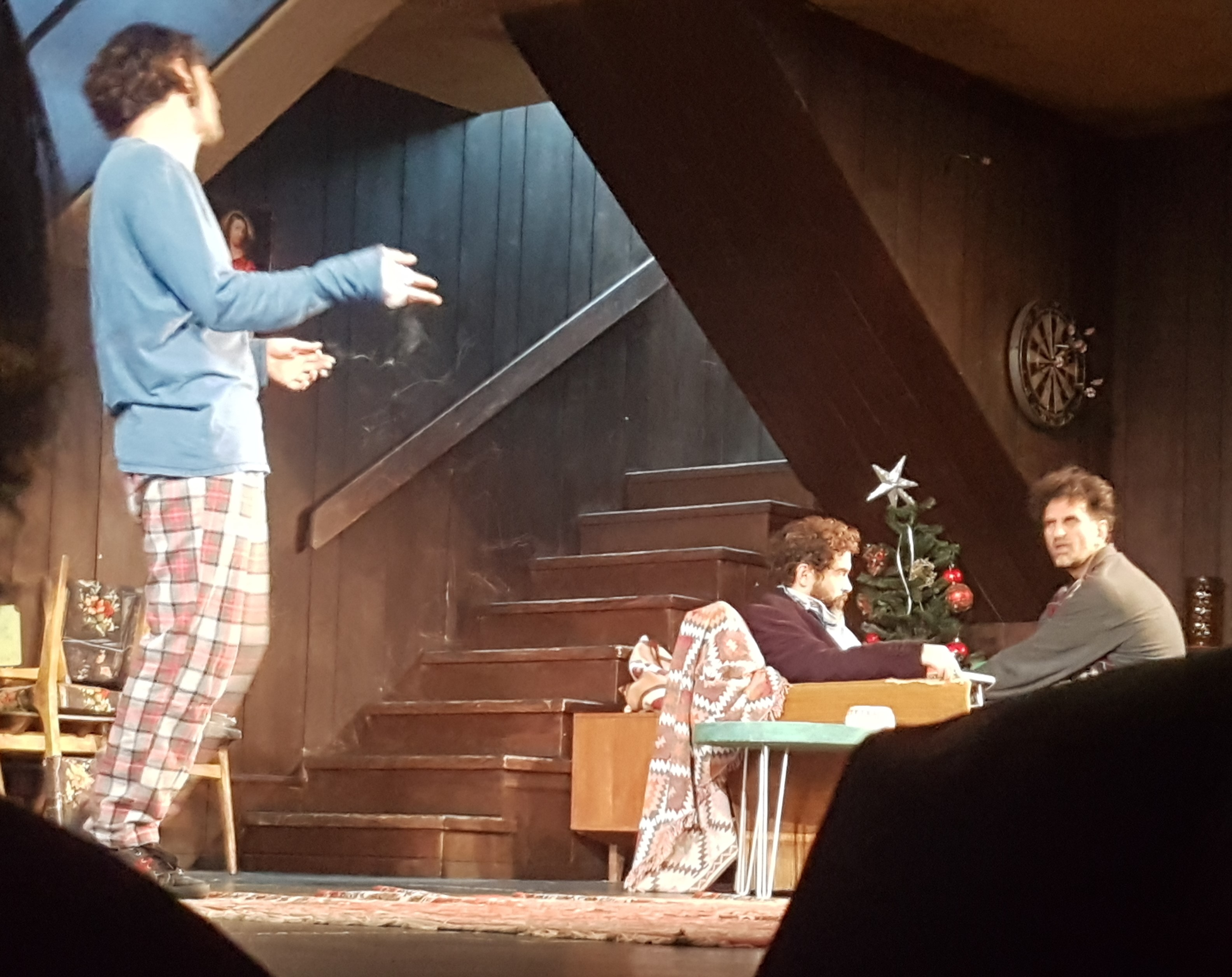
Odysseas Papaspiliopoulos, Konstantinos Markoulakis and Nikos Psarras at The Seafarer of Conor McPherson, Athinon theatre, 2018

The Seafarer is a 2006 play by Irish playwright Conor McPherson. It is set on Christmas Eve in Baldoyle, a coastal suburb north of Dublin city. The play centres on James "Sharky" Harkin, an alcoholic who has recently returned to live with his blind, ageing brother, Richard Harkin. As Sharky attempts to stay off the bottle during the holidays, he contends with the hard-drinking, irascible Richard and his own haunted conscience. It was nominated for multiple Tony Awards as well as the Olivier Award and Evening Standard Award for Best Play.

The name of the play links it to the Anglo-Saxon poem The Seafarer.

== Plot synopsis ==
Having recently been let go from his job chauffeuring a wealthy developer and his wife in Lahinch, Co. Clare, Sharky returns to Dublin to look after Richard. Tension between the brothers is evident from the start and exists mostly in Richard's constant sniping and excessive demands from his younger brother. A source of early conflict stems from Richard's inviting Nicky Giblin - Sharky's love rival - to join the men, along with Ivan, for a game of poker.

Nicky Giblin unexpectedly arrives with the mysterious Mr. Lockhart, a man of refined appearance. During a tête-à-tête, Lockhart reminds Sharky of their prior meeting which occurred twenty-five years to the day previously, when the pair were remanded together in the Bridewell Garda Barracks when Sharky had been arrested over the killing of a vagrant, Lawrence Joyce. During the period of their captivity Sharky had agreed to a game of cards in which he wagered his soul in a game of poker against Lockhart in a bid to gain his freedom. Sharky won the game and with it his freedom, but with the proviso that Lockhart would at some future date have an opportunity to play him once again.

The play culminates with the poker game played between the five men. Ostensibly a harmless game of cards, it is in fact a game for Sharky's soul as Lockhart reveals himself, in a series of private disclosures to Sharky, to be a Mephistophelian entity. Sharky once again trumps his adversary when, at the climax, Ivan reveals his winning hand of four aces which he had earlier mistaken for four fours due to his myopia.

== Style ==
Written broadly in a naturalistic style, The Seafarer also has magical realist qualities as evidenced by Lockhart's insights into Sharky's past and his monologues on the afterlife.

McPherson's dialogue is predominantly written in a working-class Dublin idiom but adopts a more self-conscious lyricism typical of the Irish theatre tradition during the Lockhart monologues.

== Production history ==
Original production

The play premiered in September 2006 at the Cottesloe auditorium of London's Royal National Theatre. It received a 2007 Olivier Award nomination for Best Play, and Jim Norton won an Olivier for Best Performance in a Supporting Role.

The cast was:

- Mr Lockhart: Ron Cook
- Ivan Curry: Conleth Hill
- James 'Sharky' Harkin: Karl Johnson
- Nicky Giblin: Michael McElhatton
- Richard Harkin: Jim Norton
- Director: Conor McPherson
- Designer: Rae Smith
- Lighting Designer: Neil Austin
- Sound Designer: Mathew Smethurst-Evans

Broadway

The Broadway production opened December 6, 2007 at the Booth Theatre and closed on March 30, 2008.

The Broadway cast was:

- Mr Lockhart: Ciarán Hinds
- Ivan Curry: Conleth Hill
- James 'Sharky' Harkin: David Morse
- Nicky Giblin: Sean Mahon
- Richard Harkin: Jim Norton
- Director: Conor McPherson
- Designer: Rae Smith
- Lighting Designer: Neil Austin
- Sound Designer: Mathew Smethurst-Evans

This production garnered multiple Tony Award nominations in 2008, for Best Play, two for Best Performance by a Featured Actor in a Play (Conleth Hill; Jim Norton), and Best Director of a Play (Conor McPherson. Jim Norton won the Tony for Featured Actor in a Play.

Ireland

The play was first performed in Ireland at the Abbey Theatre in Dublin in May 2008, directed by Jimmy Fay.

The Dublin cast was:

- Mr Lockhart: George Costigan
- Ivan Curry: Don Wycherley
- James 'Sharky' Harkin: Liam Carney
- Nicky Giblin: Phelim Drew
- Richard Harkin: Maelíosa Stafford

Subsequent productions

The West Coast premiere, directed by Jasson Minadakis, ran November 13 – December 7, 2008 at Marin Theatre Company in Mill Valley, California.

The cast was:

- Mr. Lockhart: Robert Sicular
- Ivan Curry: Andrew Hurteau
- James 'Sharky' Harkin: Andy Murray
- Nicky Giblin: John Flanagan
- Richard Harkin: Julian Lopez-Morillas

The New Jersey regional premiere, directed by Anders Cato, ran November 18, 2008 – December 14, 2008 at George Street Playhouse in New Brunswick, NJ.

The cast was:

- Mr Lockhart: Robert Cuccioli
- Ivan Curry: William Hill
- James 'Sharky' Harkin: David Adkins
- Nicky Giblin: Matthew Boston
- Richard Harkin: David Schramm

Steppenwolf Theatre Company in Chicago, IL, staged the Chicago premiere December 4, 2008 – February 22, 2009, in the Steppenwolf Downstairs Theatre. It was directed by Randall Arney and featured ensemble members Francis Guinan, Tom Irwin, John Mahoney and Alan Wilder.

The cast was:

- Mr Lockhart: Tom Irwin
- Ivan Curry: Alan Wilder
- James 'Sharky' Harkin: Francis Guinan
- Nicky Giblin: Randall Newsome
- Richard Harkin: John Mahoney

The play opened in Budapest, Hungary December 19, 2008 at Bárka. It was directed by Göttinger Pál, in a translation by Upor László.

The cast was:

- Mr Lockhart: Kálid Artúr
- Ivan Curry: Gados Béla
- James "Sharky" Harkin: Ilyés Róbert
- Nicky Giblin: Dévai Balázs
- Richard Harkin: Mucsi Zoltán

The play opened January 14, 2009 at The Studio Theatre in Washington, DC.

The Pacific Northwest premiere directed by Wilson Milam opens March 4, 2009 at Seattle Repertory Theatre in Seattle, WA with Scenic Designer Eugene Lee and cast:

- Mr Lockhart: Frank Corrado
- Ivan Curry: Russell Hodgkinson
- James 'Sharky' Harkin: Hans Altwies
- Nicky Giblin: Shawn Telford
- Richard Harkin: Sean G. Griffin

The play opened April 4, 2012 at The Alley Theatre in Houston, Texas, directed by Gregory Boyd.

The cast was:

- Mr Lockhart: Todd Waite
- Ivan Curry: Declan Mooney
- James 'Sharky' Harkin: James Black
- Nicky Giblin: Chris Hutchison
- Richard Harkin: John Tyson

The Scottish and Northern Irish premiere, directed by Rachel O'Riordan, opened February 8, 2013 at Perth Theatre in Perth, Scotland and transferred to the Lyric Theatre, Belfast on February 28, 2013. Designer: Gary McCann. Lighting: Kevin Treacy. Associate Director: Alasdair Hunter. It won Best Director (Rachel O'Riordan) and Best Ensemble at the Critics Awards for Theatre in Scotland.

The cast was:

- Mr Lockhart: Benny Young
- Ivan Curry: Sean O'Callaghan
- James 'Sharky' Harkin: Louis Dempsey
- Nicky Giblin: Tony Flynn
- Richard Harkin: Ciaran McIntyre

Play opened in Calgary, AB Canada at Alberta Theatre Projects on October 15, 2024 starring Paul Gross

The Seafarer had its first major London revival, since its National Theatre premiere, at Greenwich Theatre in 2026, in a co-production between Greenwich Theatre and The Colour Noise, with the following cast:

- James 'Sharky' Harkin: Eugene Duffy
- Richard Harkin: Ian Cooke
- Ivan Curry: James Ross Turner
- Nicky Giblin: Nick Thomas
- Mr Lockhart: Matthew Flexman

Directed by Ian Higham.

https://greenwichtheatre.org.uk/events/the-seafarer/

== Awards and nominations ==
=== Original London production ===
Year	Award	Category	Nominee	Result
2007	Laurence Olivier Award	Best New Play		Nominated
2007	Laurence Olivier Award	Best Actor in a Supporting Role	Jim Norton	Won

=== Original Broadway production ===
Year	Award	Category	Nominee	Result
2008	Tony Award	Best Play		Nominated
2008	Tony Award	Best Featured Actor in a Play	Jim Norton	Won
2008	Tony Award	Best Featured Actor in a Play	Conleth Hill	Nominated
2008	Tony Award	Best Direction of a Play	Conor McPherson	Nominated
2008	Drama Desk Award	Outstanding Featured Actor in a Play	Conleth Hill	Won
