= Fly by Night (Andy Williams song) =

Single by Andy Williams
- A-side: "Danny Boy"
- Released: November 1961
- Genre: Easy Listening
- Length: 2:35
- Label: Columbia Records 42199
- Songwriter(s): Ritchie Adams, Neval Nader

Andy Williams singles chronology
"Danny Boy" (1961)	"Fly by Night" (1961)	"Twilight Time" (1962)

"Fly by Night" is a song written by Ritchie Adams and Neval Nader and performed by Andy Williams. The song reached #20 on the U.S. adult contemporary chart and #82 on the Billboard chart in 1961. The song was the B-side to the song "Danny Boy."
