= Jim Norton (Irish actor) =

Irish actor (born 1938)

- Born: 4 January 1938 (age 88); Dublin, Ireland
- Occupation: Actor
- Years active: 1969–present
- Relatives: Betty Ann Norton (sister)

Jim Norton (born 4 January 1938) is an Irish stage, film and television character actor, known for his work in the theatre, most notably in Conor McPherson's The Seafarer, and on television as Bishop Brennan in the sitcom Father Ted.

== Early life ==
Jim Norton was born on 4 January 1938 in Dublin, Ireland, and educated at Synge Street CBS. From an early age he wanted to be an actor, and regularly attended performances at the Abbey Theatre. His mother, Frances, played the violin and his father, Eugene, was a baritone singer. Eugene worked as a bakery manager. Jim had one sibling, the late acting teacher Betty Ann Norton.

== Career ==
Norton has been acting for over fifty years in theatre, television, and film, and frequently plays clergymen, most notably Bishop Brennan in the sitcom Father Ted, as well as roles in The Sweeney (1975), Peak Practice (1993), Sunset Heights (1997), A Love Divided (1999), Rebus: Black and Blue (2000), Mad About Mambo (2000), Boxed (2003) and Jimmy's Hall (2014).

Norton starred as Finian McLonergan in the critically acclaimed New York City Center's 2009 production of Finian's Rainbow, and in October 2009 reprised the role in the Broadway revival at the St. James Theatre. His co-stars were Cheyenne Jackson (Woody) and Kate Baldwin (Sharon).

=== Television ===
As well as Bishop Brennan in Father Ted, Norton also played: Albert Einstein in two episodes of Star Trek: The Next Generation (namely "The Nth Degree" and "Descent"); the librarian Lieutenant James Porteous in the highly acclaimed 1970s British television drama series Colditz; Phil Harrister, a criminal involved in an intricate bank robbery, in The Sweeney episode "Contact Breaker"; O'Brady in the Minder episode "National Pelmet"; and Rory, a roguish but genteel Irishman who is diagnosed with cirrhosis of the liver, in The Royal episode "Beggars and Choosers". Norton also played the role of theatre director, Jeremy Williams, in the 1973 episode of Crown Court (TV series) called "Public Lives".

Norton has appeared in two episodes of Van der Valk. On Babylon 5 he appeared in a number of roles, including that of Ombuds Wellington in the 1994 episodes "Grail" and "The Quality of Mercy"; a Narn in "Dust to Dust" (1996); and Dr. Lazarenn, a Markab doctor, in "Confessions and Lamentations" (1995). In Fall of Eagles he played Alexander Kerensky. He also appeared as the butler 'Wentworth' in the Frasier Episode 'The Club' (Season 2, Episode 17, 1995).

Other television work includes: 1990, Agatha Christie's Poirot; Waking the Dead; Cheers; Frasier; Midsomer Murders; Maigret and Rumpole of the Bailey as Fig Newton, Stan Laurel in the BBC drama Stan (2006) and Larry Joyce in the 2013 television drama Deception, Silas Mitton, Brendan Robinson and Digger in the stop motion series The Treacle People (1996–1997) and as the timid Gardener in the first series of the long-running CITV children's series T-Bag: "Wonders in Letterland" (1985) He also appeared as a prison psychiatrist in "The Bill" titled Karma (Season 12, Episode 109) (1996)

=== Films ===
1960s

Norton made his film debut with a small role in the 1965 thriller The Face of Fu Manchu starring Christopher Lee, and later appeared in the 1969 epic film Alfred the Great as Thanet.

1970s

Norton played the part of Pongo in the screen version of Spike Milligan's war-time memoir Adolf Hitler: My Part in his Downfall. In 1971 he played Chris Cawsey (aka "The Rat Man"), one of several villains in the controversial Sam Peckinpah film Straw Dogs starring Dustin Hoffman. His character had a deviously infectious, deliberately irritating laugh that helped build tension throughout the film.

1990s

Norton appeared in the movie Memoirs of an Invisible Man alongside Chevy Chase in 1992. In the same year he also appeared in the Irish-made film Into the West.He also appeared in the hit comedy sitcom Father Ted where he played his famous role as Bishop Brennan

2000s

Norton appeared in the comedy On the Nose as Patrick Cassidy, along with Dan Aykroyd and Robbie Coltrane, in 2001. He appeared in a cameo in Harry Potter and the Chamber of Secrets in 2002 as Mr. Mason. He played an Irish immigrant in the 2005 Australian/UK co-production, The Oyster Farmer. He played title role of Stan Laurel in the 2006 TV movie Stan, based on Neil Brand's radio play of the same name. He played Herr Liszt in the 2008 holocaust film The Boy in the Striped Pyjamas.

2010s

In 2011 Norton appeared as the character Old Mr Black in the film Extremely Loud & Incredibly Close directed by Stephen Daldry. He appeared in the 2011 film Water for Elephants, in which he portrays a circus worker called "Camel" who befriends a character played by Robert Pattinson. In 2012 he appeared as the character Tommy in the short film Homemade written by Matthew Roche and directed by Luke McManus. He was in the Ken Loach film Jimmy's Hall which was released in 2014. He plays the role of Mr. Heelshire in 2016 film The Boy. In 2018 he played the role of Mr. Binnacle in Mary Poppins Returns. In 2019 he played the role of the plane passenger Padraig whose death instigates the plan to bury him next to his brother in The Last Right.

=== Theatre ===
Norton has a longtime partnership with playwright Conor McPherson, having originated roles in six of his plays in Dublin, London and New York, and for which he has won both the Tony and Olivier Award. Norton played Jack in The Weir (1997), Joe in Port Authority (2001), Matthew in Come on Over (2001), Richard in The Seafarer (2006–7), Reverend Berkeley in The Veil (2011), and Maurice in The Night Alive (2013).

In 1990 he appeared in the original production of Frank McGuinness's The Bread Man at the Gate Theatre.

In 2004 he took part in the touring production of Martin McDonagh's The Pillowman.

In 2006/7 he appeared in Conor McPherson's The Seafarer at The National Theatre, and reprised the same role in the 2008 Broadway theatre production of the play.

In 2012, he performed as The Chairman in a Broadway adaptation of The Mystery of Edwin Drood.

In 2013/2014 he played Maurice in Conor McPherson's The Night Alive, a Donmar Warehouse production, transferred to the Atlantic Theatre Company in New York.

Norton starred as Candy in the 2014 Broadway revival of John Steinbeck's Of Mice and Men (alongside James Franco and fellow Irishman Chris O'Dowd) at the Longacre Theatre. In 2016, he played Giles Corey in Ivo van Hove's production of Arthur Miller's The Crucible at the Walter Kerr Theatre.

In 2022/2023, he portrayed Judge Taylor in To Kill A Mockingbird in London's West End.

=== Audio work ===
Norton voiced Major Kennet in the 2003 Doctor Who animated serial, Scream of the Shalka.

Norton has recorded the whole of James Joyce's Ulysses (with Marcella Riordan), Dubliners, Finnegans Wake (abridged with Marcella Riordan) and A Portrait of the Artist as a Young Man for Naxos Records, released in 2004.

The Third Policeman by Flann O'Brien 2009.

Thorndyke: Forensic Investigator: for BBC Radio 4 Extra 2011.

BBC Radio production of The Mustard Seed by Nick Warburton

The House on the Borderland by William Hope Hodgson: BBC Radio 4 Extra, May 2012

Mr Deasy in Ulysses: BBC Radio 4 production for Bloomsday 16 June 2012

Narrator: The Stack, short story by Rose Tremain, broadcast on BBC Radio 4 Extra, 24 September 2012.

Death in BBC Radio 4 production of Good Omens by Terry Pratchett and Neil Gaiman, December 2014.

Silas Mitton and Brendan Robinson in The Treacle People: Still Sticky, April 2025.

== Awards and honours ==
Year	Association	Category	Work	Result	Notes
1964	Jacob's Award	Best Acting Performance	Solo	Won	For Telefís Éireann in which he played a gay man.
2004	IFTA	Best Supporting Actor in Film/TV	Proof	Nominated	An Irish television series, co-produced by Subotica for broadcast on RTÉ.
2006	Legend Award	Best Acting Performance	Stan	Won	In the Elk Acting Festival, Dundonald, Belfast, as Stan Laurel in a television docudrama.
2008	Olivier Award	Best Actor in a Supporting Role	The Seafarer	Won	Written and directed by Conor McPherson.
2008	Tony Award	Best Featured Actor	The Seafarer	Won	Written and directed by Conor McPherson.
2016	Outer Critics Circle Award	Best Featured Actor	The Crucible	Nominated	Written by Arthur Miller, and directed by Ivo van Hove.
