= Universal Television Alternative Studio UK =

Independent British television production company

- Company type: Subsidiary
- Industry: Television
- Founded: 2000; 26 years ago
- Founders: David Granger; Will MacDonald
- Key people: Helen Kruger Blatt (managing director)
- Products: Television programs
- Parent: Universal International Studios (2010–present)
- Website: monkeykingdom.com

Universal Television Alternative Studio UK (formerly known as Monkey Kingdom) is a British television production company based in London, United Kingdom, with offices in Los Angeles. Established by David Granger and Will MacDonald in 2000, the company was acquired by NBCUniversal in 2010. Monkey was NBCUniversal's third UK production venture following the acquisition of Carnival and the launch of WTTV, NBCUniversal's joint venture with Working Title Films, Tim Bevan and Eric Fellner.

The company creates, develops, produces, and sells entertainment and factual programming in the United Kingdom and the United States. It can be a live studio, structured reality, factual, documentary, entertainment, scripted comedy, digital and brand-driven content.

These include reality show Made in Chelsea, reality/quiz hybrid The Question Jury (the best Daytime Programme 2017), music entertainment show TFI Friday, comedy show The Charlotte Church Show, The Real Housewives of Cheshire, Elton John: Me, Myself & I, The House of Obsessive Compulsives, and hidden camera fixed-rig comedy show Make My Day, and comedy sketch series Swinging.

The company has received several nominations and awards from BAFTA, Rose d'Or, International Emmy, RTS Award, The Comedy Awards and Broadcast Awards for their productions. These include the award-winning structured reality TV show Made in Chelsea, TFI Friday, Elton John: Me, Myself & I, award-winning game show The Question Jury and The Real Housewives of Cheshire.

In 2018, Monkey released the first all-black, all-female line-up on a British TV panel show, Don’t Hate the Playaz. This marked to be an achievement in the entertainment industry as 40% of the senior team of "Made in Chelsea" now comprises individuals from black, Asian, or other minority ethnic backgrounds.

In May 2025 when Monkey's parent company Universal International Studios announced its layoffs, they moved the studio to Universal Studio Group's American unscripted television division Universal Television Alternative Studio, giving them their own British unscripted arm and rebranding to Universal Television Alternative Studio UK (UTAS UK), effectively retiring the Monkey name after 25 years with their production staff being placed under UTAS's team.

Other than that, Monkey has produced shows for the BBC, ITV, Channel 4, IKEA, and Amnesty International.

Before founding Monkey, David Granger and Will MacDonald produced International Emmy/BAFTA/Rose d'Or-winning Don't Forget Your Toothbrush, TFI Friday, The Priory, Lock, Stock..., MTV's Most Wanted and The Big Breakfast.

== History ==
In July 2009, Monkey Kingdom signed a deal with ITV Studios's global distribution arm ITV Global Entertainment with them backing and expanding Monkey Kingdom's entry into the scripted television business, Catherine Oldfield became head of Monkey Kingdom's scripted production business.

== Programmes Produced by Universal Television Alternative Studio UK ==
=== 2026 ===
Programme	Broadcaster
The Real Housewives of Cheshire (series 19)	ITV2
The Real Housewives of London (series 2)	Hayu
Saturday Night Live UK	Sky One

=== 2025 ===
Programme	Broadcaster
The Real Housewives of London (series 1)	Hayu

== Programmes Produced by Monkey Kingdom ==
=== 2025 ===
Programme	Broadcaster
The Real Housewives of Cheshire (series 18)	ITVBe

=== 2024 ===
Programme	Broadcaster
The Real Housewives of Cheshire (series 17)	ITVBe
The Real Housewives of Cheshire (series 16 special: The Real Housewives of Cheshire: Pride)	ITVBe

=== 2023 ===
Programme	Broadcaster
The Real Housewives of Cheshire (series 16)	ITVBe

=== 2022 ===
Programme	Broadcaster
The Real Housewives of Cheshire (series 15 special: The Real Housewives of Cheshire: Christmas Cruising)	ITVBe
The Real Housewives of Cheshire (series 15)	ITVBe
The Real Housewives of Cheshire (series 14 special: Real Housewives and the Menopause)	ITVBe
The Real Housewives of Jersey (series 2)	ITVBe

=== 2021 ===
Programme	Broadcaster
The Emily Atack Show (series 2)	ITV2
The Real Housewives of Cheshire (series 14)	ITVBe
The Real Housewives of Cheshire (series 13)	ITVBe
The Real Housewives of Jersey (series 2)	ITVBe
The Real Housewives of Jersey (series 1)	ITVBe
Pete & Sam's Reality News	E4
Pete & Sam's Reality News (series 2)	E4
Wonder Raps	Sky Kids

=== 2020 ===
Programme	Broadcaster
The Emily Atack Show (series 1)	ITV2
Celebrity Karaoke Club (series 1)	ITV2
The Real Housewives of Cheshire (series 12)	ITVBe
The Real Housewives of Cheshire (series 11)	ITVBe
The Real Housewives of Jersey (series 1)	ITVBe

=== 2019 ===
Programme	Broadcaster
The Real Housewives of Cheshire (series 10)	ITVBe
The Real Housewives of Cheshire (series 9)	ITVBe

=== 2018 ===
Programme	Broadcaster
Made in Chelsea (series 15)	E4
The Real Housewives of Cheshire (series 8)	ITVBe
The Real Housewives of Cheshire (series 7)	ITVBe

=== 2017 ===
Programme	Broadcaster
Made in Chelsea (series 14)	E4
Made in Chelsea (series 13)	E4
Made in Chelsea: Ibiza	E4
The Real Housewives of Cheshire (series 6)	ITVBe
The Real Housewives of Cheshire (series 5)	ITVBe
Tamara's World	ITVBe

=== 2016 ===
Programme	Broadcaster
Newlyweds (series 3)	Bravo
Tour Group	Bravo
Alan Carr's Grease Night	Channel 4
The Real Housewives of Cheshire (series 4)	ITVBe
The Real Housewives of Cheshire (series 3)	ITVBe
Made in Chelsea (series 12)	E4
Made in Chelsea: South of France	E4
Made in Chelsea (series 11)	E4
The Question Jury (series 1)	Channel 4

=== 2015 ===
Programme	Broadcaster
Newlyweds: Where are they Now?	Bravo
Newlyweds (series 2)	Bravo
The Real Housewives of Cheshire (series 2)	ITVBe
The Real Housewives of Cheshire (series 1)	ITVBe
TFI Friday	Channel 4
TFI Friday (anniversary special)	Channel 4
Made in Chelsea: LA	E4
Made in Chelsea (series 10)	E4
Made in Chelsea (series 9)	E4

=== 2014 ===
Programme	Broadcaster
Young, Dumb and Living Off Mum (international - Australia)	Seven Network
Young, Lazy and Driving Us Crazy	Seven Network
Hitched	Sky Living
First Time Farmers (series 2)	Channel 4
Made in Chelsea (series 8)	E4
Made in Chelsea (series 7)	E4
Made in Chelsea: NYC	E4

=== 2013 ===
Programme	Broadcaster
Trust Me, I'm a Game Show Host	TBS
Party On!	E!
First Time Farmers (series 1)	Channel 4
Made in Chelsea (series 6)	E4
Made in Chelsea (series 5)	E4
Newlyweds (series 1)	Bravo

=== 2012 ===
Programme	Broadcaster
Sex, Lies and Rinsing Guys	Channel 4
Summer Daze	Channel 4/T4
E! Live from the Red Carpet (BAFTAs)	E!
Made in Chelsea (series 4)	E4
Made in Chelsea (series 3)	E4

=== 2011 ===
Programme	Broadcaster
Meet the Middletons	Channel 4
Home for the Holidays	Channel 4
Made in Chelsea (series 2)	E4
Young, Dumb and Living Off Mum (series 3)	BBC Three

=== 2010 ===
Programme	Broadcaster
A Comedy Roast	Channel 4
IKEA	Various (UK)
Young, Dumb and Living Off Mum (series 2)	BBC3
Young, Dumb and Living Off Mum/Young and Spoiled (Ung Och Bortskamd) (international - Sweden)	AVT

=== 2009 ===
Programme	Broadcaster
Teen America: Rodeo	BBC Switch
Teen America: Christians	BBC Switch
Man vs. Cartoon	TruTV
Cash Point	BBC Comedy
Make My Day USA	TV Land
Make My Day	Channel 4
Young, Dumb and Living Off Mum (series 1)	BBC3

=== 2008 ===
Programme	Broadcaster
Fast Food Junkies Go Native	Channel 4
Class of 2008	BBC Two
Sound	BBC Two
Best Friend Rehab	Fiver
Prince Charles' Other Mistress	Channel 4
The Passions of Girls Aloud	ITV2
The Secret World of Sam King	Bebo
Orange Unlit	N/A (UK) - Digital
The Feeling: Face the Music	Channel 4/T4
The Secret Policeman's Ball 2008	Channel 4
The Charlotte Church Show (series 3)	Channel 4

=== 2007 ===
Programme	Broadcaster
High School Dance	E4
The Charlotte Church Show (series 2)	Channel 4
Raised by the Hand of God	Five
Trapped By My Twin	Channel 4
Dragonette - Channel 4 Music Feature	Channel 4
Fist of Zen (series 2)	MTV
Elton John: Me, Myself & I	ITV
Girls Aloud: Off the Record	E4
Grand Slam USA	GSN
Grand Slam (Spain)	Cuatro
Make My Day (international)	N/A

=== 2006 ===
Programme	Broadcaster
Movie Lounge	Five
The 9/11 Liars	Channel 4
The House of Agoraphobics	Channel 4
Fist of Zen (series 1)	MTV
The Curse of Superman	Channel 4
Honey I Suckle the Kids	Five/Sundance
Whatever	Channel 4
Dispatches - NHS Postcode Lottery	Channel 4
The Charlotte Church Show (series 1)	Channel 4
Transmission Impossible	Channel 4
Swinging (series 2)	Five/Sundance

=== 2005 ===
Programme	Broadcaster
Pushy Parents	Five
X-Rated: Top 20 Most Controversial TV Moments	E4
Empire Awards	Five
Whatever: Comedy Lab	Channel 4
Al Murray's Showbiz Fights	Channel 4
My Kind of Town (TV series)	ABC
The House of Obsessive Compulsives	Channel 4
Swinging (series 1)	Five
Patty Edwards: Sex Therapist	Channel 5
Julian Clary's Showbiz Hissy Fits	Channel 4

=== 2004 ===
He's Starsky, I'm Hutch	Channel 4
Steven Spielberg: the Man and his Movies	Five
Bare	Trouble
Ed vs. Spencer	Sky One/BBC America
Hitler's Favorite Royal	Channel 4
What Sadie Did Next	E4
The Chart	Five

=== 2003 ===
Swag	Five
Surviving the Wave: A Thailand Story	BBC Three
Ex-Rated	Channel 4
Make My Day (series 2)	Channel 4
TRBL	Trouble
Rather Good Videos	Channel 4
The World's Best New Year's Eve Party Countdown	Channel 5
Ash: Love & Destruction	Channel 4
Grand Slam	Channel 4

=== 2002 ===
Make My Day (series 1)	Channel 4
Swept Away: the Making Of	MTV
The House of Astonishment	Five
Born Sloppy	Channel 4

== Awards & Nominations ==
2019

- Winner - British LGBT Awards (The Bi Life)
- Nominated - RTS Awards: Best Entertainment Show (Don't Hate The Playaz)

2018

- Nominated - TRIC Awards: Reality Show (Made in Chelsea)
- Nominated - TRIC Awards: Reality Show (The Real Housewives of Cheshire)
- Nominated - O2 Media Awards: Best Entertainment Programme (Tanya's Extreme Therapies)
- Nominated - RTS Awards: Best Daytime Programme (The Question Jury)

2017

- Winner - Broadcast Awards: Best Daytime Programme (The Question Jury)
- Winner - RTS Awards North West: Best Entertainment Programme (The Real Housewives of Cheshire)
- Nominated - Broadcast Awards: Best Music Programme (TFI Friday)
- Nominated - RTS Awards: Best Daytime Programme (The Question Jury)
- Nominated - TRIC Awards: Satellite/Digital Programme (Made in Chelsea)
- Nominated - Televisual Bulldog Awards: Panel, Quiz or Chat Show (The Question Jury)
- Nominated - Format Awards: Best Studio-based Gameshow Format (The Question Jury)

2016

- Nominated - BAFTA: Entertainment Programme (TFI Friday Anniversary Special)

2015

- Winner - Music Week Sync Awards: Most Shazamed TV Show (Made in Chelsea)

2014

- Winner - Music Week Sync Awards: TV Show: Entertainment - Live Performance (Made in Chelsea)
- Nominated - TV Choice Awards: Best Reality Show (Made in Chelsea)
- Nominated - National Reality Television Awards: Best Entertainment (Made in Chelsea)
- Winner - Broadcast Digital Awards: Best Game (Made in Chelsea game)
- Nominated - TRIC Awards: Satellite/Digital Programme (Made in Chelsea)

2013

- Winner - BAFTA: Reality & Constructed Factual (Made in Chelsea)
- Nominated - Broadcast Digital Awards: Best Entertainment Programme (Made in Chelsea)
- Nominated - TV Choice Awards: Best Reality Show (Made in Chelsea)
- Nominated - National Reality Television Awards: Best Entertainment (Made in Chelsea)

2012

- Winner - National Reality Television Awards: Best Reality Non-Competitive Show (Made in Chelsea)
- Winner - National Reality Television Awards: Personality of the Year (Spencer Matthews - Made in Chelsea)
- Winner - National Reality Television Awards: Best Female Personality (Millie Mackintosh - Made in Chelsea)
- Nominated - BAFTA: Reality & Constructed Factual (Made in Chelsea)
- Nominated - TV Choice Awards: Best Reality Show (Made in Chelsea)

2010

- Winner - Thinkbox: Best Advert January/February (IKEA)

2008

- Nominated - Rose d'Or: Best Entertainer, Montreux International Television Festival (The Charlotte Church Show)
- Nominated - Focal Awards: Best Use of Footage in an Entertainment Programme (Elton John: Me, Myself & I)

2007

- Winner - Glamour (magazine): TV Personality of the Year (The Charlotte Church Show)
- Nominated - Televisual Bulldog Awards: Best Panel/Chat Show (The Charlotte Church Show)
- Winner - Rose d'Or: Best Female Comedy Performance, Montreux International Television Festival (Swinging)

2006

- Winner - British Comedy Awards: Best Newcomer (The Charlotte Church Show)
- Nominated - Mental Health Awards: Best TV Documentary (House of Obsessive Compulsives)

2004

- Nominated - Rose d'Or, Montreux International Television Festival (SWAG)
- Nominated - Rose d'Or, Montreux International Television Festival: Best Pilot (Ex-Rated)

2003

- Winner - Rose d'Or, Montreux International Television Festival: Best Gameshow (Make My Day)
- Nominated - Rose d'Or, Montreux International Television Festival: Best Reality (Make My Day)
