= List of programmes broadcast by E4 =

E4 is a British television channel, a sister station of Channel 4. The following is a list of programmes that are broadcast on E4.

== Currently broadcast ==
=== Comedies ===
- 8 Out of 10 Cats (2017–present) (Also shown on E4 Extra)
- The Inbetweeners (2008–10)
- The Holden Girls: Mandy & Myrtle (2021-present)

=== Reality/non-scripted ===
- Body Fixers (2016–present)
- Coach Trip (2016–present)
- Celebs Go Dating (2016–present)
- Don't Tell the Bride (2017–present)
- First Dates Teens (2021-present)
- GamesMaster (2021–present)
- Gogglebox (repeated from Channel 4)
- Made in Chelsea (2011–present)
- Married at First Sight UK (2021–present) (moved from Channel 4 for series six)
- Naked Attraction (repeated from Channel 4)
- Pete & Sam's Reality News (2020-present)
- The Real Dirty Dancing (2022–present)
- Rude Tube (2008–2017, moved to E4 Extra)
- Street Dance: Against the Odds (2022–present)
- Teen Mum Academy (2022–present)

=== Channel 4 programming ===
- Hollyoaks (soap opera) (2001–present)

=== Acquired programming from North America (first run) ===
- Below Deck Mediterranean (reality) (2021–present) (second run only) (first run rights are with Hayu)
- Black-ish (sitcom) (2016–present)
- Brooklyn Nine-Nine (sitcom) (2014–present)
- The Goldbergs (sitcom) (2015–present)
- Impractical Jokers (2023–present) (also on Comedy Central)
- Killing It (2022–present)
- Legendary (2021–present)
- Lego Masters USA (2021–present)
- Modern Family (2022–present) (moved from Sky Comedy and Sky Showcase)
- The Neighborhood (2022–present)
- 12 Dates of Christmas (2021–present)
- The Simpsons (2025–present) (moved from Channel 4 after 20 years of airing on the main channel. Still airs on Channel 4 on weekends, picking up where 4seven left off.)
- Summer House (2022–present) (second run only, also available on Hayu)
- Wipeout USA (sports) (2021–present)

=== Acquired programming from Australia (first run) ===
- First Dates Australia (reality) (2016–present)
- Gogglebox Australia (reality) (2018–present)
- Lego Masters Australia (2021–present)
- Married at First Sight Australia (2016–present)

=== Acquired programming (repeats) ===
- Ramsay's Kitchen Nightmares USA (reality)

== Previously broadcast ==
=== E4 comedies ===
- School of Comedy (2009–10)
- PhoneShop (2010–13)
- Beaver Falls (2011–12)
- Cardinal Burns (2012 Channel 4 2014)
- The Midnight Beast (2012–14)
- Noel Fielding's Luxury Comedy (2012–14)
- Drifters (2013–2016)
- Chewing Gum (2015–2017)
- Wasted (2016)
- Crazyhead (2016)
- Gap Year (2017)
- Dead Pixels (2019–2021)
- Maxxx (2020)

=== Acquired comedies ===
- 2 Broke Girls (sitcom)
- Angie Tribeca (sitcom)
- Baby Daddy (sitcom)
- Being Erica (comedy-drama)
- Birdgirl (2021–2022)
- Happy Endings (sitcom)
- Harley Quinn (animation)
- How I Met Your Mother (sitcom)
- Marry Me (sitcom)
- Melissa and Joey (sitcom)
- Mike & Molly (sitcom)
- Robot Chicken (animation)
- Rick and Morty (animation)
- Rules of Engagement (sitcom)
- Smiling Friends (animation) (Seasons 1 and 2; Season 3 on HBO Max)
- Speechless (sitcom)
- Suburgatory (sitcom)
- Teenage Euthanasia (animation)
- The Big Bang Theory (sitcom)
- Tuca & Bertie (animation)
- Young & Hungry (sitcom)
- Young Sheldon (sitcom)

=== E4 dramas ===
- Skins (2007–13)
- Misfits (2009–13)
- My Mad Fat Diary (2013–15)
- Youngers (2013–14)
- Glue (2014)
- Tripped (2015)
- The Aliens (2016)

=== Acquired dramas ===
- 90210 (teen drama)
- Being Erica (comedy-drama)
- Charlie's Angels (drama)
- Charmed (fantasy-drama)
- Life Unexpected (drama)
- Make It or Break It (teen drama)
- Revenge (drama)
- Supernatural (fantasy-drama)
- The Tomorrow People (sci-fi drama)
- Veronica Mars (teen drama-mystery)

=== Reality/non-scripted ===
- Rude Tube (2008–2018, moved to 4Music)
- Dirty Sexy Things (2011)
- Playing It Straight (2011–2012)
- Tool Academy (2011–2012)
- Desperate Scousewives (2011–2012)
- What Happens in Kavos... (2013)
- Party House (2014)
- Troy (2014–2015)
- Virtually Famous (2014–2017)
- Tattoo Fixers (2015–2019)
- Young, Free and Single: Live (2015)
- Look Into my Eyes (2015–present)
- How to.. (2015–present)
- Rich Kids of Instagram (2016)
- Stage School (2016–2017)
- Polterguest (2016–present)
- Game of Clones (2017)
- The Crystal Maze (15 November 2020–31 December 2020) (the show moved from its slot on Channel 4 to run-out unaired episodes on E4)

=== Spin-off from Channel 4 programming ===
- The Jump: On the Piste (2015)

=== Other previous programming ===
- The 100 (drama)
- 100 Greatest (documentary)
- Accidentally on Purpose (sitcom)
- The Adam and Joe Show (comedy) (moved from Channel 4)
- Agents of S.H.I.E.L.D. (superhero drama) (moved from Channel 4, now moved to Disney+)
- Allen Gregory (animated comedy)
- Almost Royal (comedy-reality)
- As If (comedy-drama)
- Balls of Steel Australia (comedy)
- Banana (drama)
- Banzai (comedy/game show) (now on All 4)
- Bob's Burgers (animated comedy) (moved to Comedy Central after two seasons, now moved to Disney+ for future seasons)
- The Class (sitcom)
- The Cleveland Show (animated comedy) (moved to ITV2, now moved to Disney+)
- Clone High (animated comedy)
- Containment (sci-fi drama)
- Gotham (superhero drama) (seasons 4–5 only)
- Desperate Housewives (comedy-drama)
- Dirty Sexy Money (drama)
- The Drew Carey Show (sitcom)
- Empire (drama) (moved to 5Star after three seasons)
- ER (medical drama) (moved to More4 after seven seasons)
- The Event (drama)
- Everwood (drama)
- Father Ted (sitcom) (repeats now on E4 Extra)
- Fonejacker (comedy)
- Franklin & Bash (comedy-drama) (moved to Sony Channel after two seasons)
- Friends (sitcom) (repeats now on Comedy Central) (due to return to E4 in January 2027)
- Gilmore Girls (comedy-drama) (repeats now on 5Star and Paramount Network)
- Glee (comedy-drama) (moved to Sky One after two seasons)
- Greek (comedy-drama)
- Happy Together (sitcom)
- Hollyoaks Best Bits 2011 (drama)
- Hollyoaks: Chasing Rainbows (drama)
- Hollyoaks Favourites (drama)
- Hollyoaks: In the City (drama)
- Hollyoaks Later (drama)
- Hollyoaks: Let Loose (drama)
- Hollyoaks: A Little Film About Love (drama)
- Hollyoaks Omnibus
- Hollyoaks: The Good, the Bad and the Gorgeous (drama)
- The Inbetweeners
- The Inbetweeners USA (sitcom)
- Jane the Virgin (drama) (after two seasons moved to Netflix, now on ITVBe)
- Kevin Can Wait (sitcom)
- King of the Hill (animated comedy) (repeats moved to 4Music but later disappeared from the schedule on 4Music sometime in 2020 and never aired on UK television again)
- Krypton (sci-fi drama)
- Last Man Standing (sitcom) (moved to 5Star, now moved to Disney+ for the final season)
- Let's Get Physical (sitcom)
- Lost (drama) (moved to Sky One after two seasons)
- Man with a Plan (sitcom)
- The Mindy Project (sitcom)
- My Name Is Earl (sitcom) (now on Disney+)
- Napoleon Dynamite (animated comedy)
- Nashville (drama) (moved to Sky Living after one season)
- The New Normal (sitcom)
- New Girl (sitcom)
- Night Court (sitcom)
- No Angels (comedy-drama)
- The O.C. (drama) (now on ITV2)
- One Tree Hill (drama) (now on ITV2)
- Oz (prison-drama)
- Perfect Couples (sitcom)
- Princess Nikki (reality)
- Queer as Folk (drama)
- Ramsay's Kitchen Nightmares
- Reaper (comedy-drama)
- The Ricky Gervais Show (animated comedy)
- Rock School (documentary/reality, also known as The Samanie & Ellie Programme)
- Rush Hour (comedy-drama)
- Samantha Who? (sitcom)
- School of Rock (music comedy) (now on Nickelodeon and Paramount+)
- Scream Queens (horror comedy-drama) (now on Disney+)
- Scrubs (medical sitcom) (now on Disney+ and E4 Extra)
- The Secret Life of Us (drama)
- Sex and the City (comedy-drama) (now on Sky Comedy)
- Shipwrecked (reality)
- Shameless (comedy-drama)
- Six Feet Under (comedy-drama)
- Smallville (superhero drama)
- The Sopranos (drama) (repeats now on Sky Atlantic)
- Takeover TV (comedy) (moved from Channel 4)
- Taking New York (reality)
- Teachers (comedy-drama)
- Timeless (sci-fi drama)
- Two and a Half Men (sitcom)
- The War at Home (sitcom)
- The West Wing (political-drama) (moved to More4 after four seasons)
- Totally Frank (music/drama about a failed girl band)
- Ugly Betty (comedy-drama)
- What About Brian (comedy-drama)
- Wife Swap UK (reality)
- Wildfire (drama)
- X-Rated: The TV They Tried to Ban (documentary)
