= Made in Chelsea series 12 =

Made in Chelsea
- Series 12
- No. of episodes: 11

Release
- Original network: E4
- Original release: 10 October – 19 December 2016

Series chronology
- ← Previous; South of France Next → Series 13

The twelfth series of Made in Chelsea is a British structured-reality television programme that began airing on 10 October 2016 on E4, and concluded on 26 December 2016 following eleven episodes and a "Christmas Party" special episode hosted by Rick Edwards. This series also featured the return of former cast members Fred Ferrier and Oliver Proudlock having last appeared in the fourth and tenth series respectively. the new cast members for this series included Emily Blackwell, Julius Cowdrey and Nick Summerfield, as well as Akin Solanke-Caulker, who is the first black cast member to feature in the show. This is the final series to include Jess Woodley. This series focused heavily on the divide between the girls as Tiff and Toff's ongoing feud continued, until they eventually made up much to the distress of Toff's best friend Jess. As well as this, the start of Olivia and Fred's new romance is included in this series.

== Cast ==
- Akin Solanke-Caulker
- Alex Mytton
- Alexandra "Binky" Felstead
- Emily Blackwell
- Francis Boulle
- Frankie Gaff
- Fredrik Ferrier
- Georgia "Toff" Toffolo
- Jamie Laing
- Jess Woodley
- Josh "JP" Patterson
- Julius Cowdrey
- Louise Thompson
- Mark-Francis Vandelli
- Nick Summerfield
- Oliver Proudlock
- Olivia Bentley
- Ollie Locke
- Rosie Fortescue
- Ryan Libbey
- Sam Thompson
- Stephanie Pratt
- Tiff Watson
- Victoria Baker-Harber

== Episodes ==
No. overall	No. in season	Title	Original release date	Duration	UK viewers
136	1	"I Genuinely Believe He Thinks He's In A Disney Film"	10 October 2016	60 minutes	694,000
Back home in Chelsea, Binky is flooded with calls from JP as he begins his mission to win her back, confessing to her that he still loves her. After fearing that Sam is getting too comfortable in their relationship, Tiff flirts with new boy Julius in front of his face in an attempt to make him jealous. Elsewhere Alex and Frankie's feud continues, Proudlock makes a welcome return to the group, and there's a frosty atmosphere when Toff and Jess isolate themselves. Enraged over JP's sudden U-turn over Binky, Ollie has it out with him leading to an explosive argument.
137	2	"Every Time Francis Paints A Girl's Heart Is Broken"	17 October 2016	60 minutes	798,000
The tension between Jess and Toff and the remaining girls intensifies when Emily tells Olivia what they've been saying about her. Meanwhile Binky is hit with a huge dilemma over JP and seeks advice from both Ollie and her Mum, but they don't give her the encouragement she wanted. Alex brings Emily to Olivia's birthday party where Rosie urges Binky to move on from JP and get with Julius instead, and Frankie bans Jamie from seeing Jess. Francis returns to Chelsea with a huge gesture for Olivia, whilst Binky and JP move forward.
138	3	"You Have Got Naughty Little Thing Written All Over Your Face"	24 October 2016	60 minutes	845,000
Olivia is knocked for six when Francis tells her they're better off as friends, whilst Jess tells Alex off for going to the girls with what she's said about them. Binky plans a camping trip away, but after hearing that Julius may have feelings for her, Ollie decides to invite him along for "fun" – but then confesses to having an ulterior motive when JP rages with him. Jess and Toff's attempt to clear the air with the girls turn sour, whilst Rosie and Louise both notice the sexual tension between Binky and Julius. Elsewhere Francis delivers a speech about his new passion; Pangolins.
139	4	"Kanye West, What Is That?"	31 October 2016	60 minutes	853,000
Emily catches a spark between Alex and Jess making her feel uncomfortable with them still being friends. Binky decides to work things out with JP, but Ollie still thinks she belongs with Julius. After a nude photo shoot for Olivia, the boys think that Fred may be falling for her – but Francis refuses to believe it. There's tension when JP and Julius come face-to-face with each other. Elsewhere Stephanie returns to hear the latest gossip in Chelsea, Jess feels there may actually be a spark between her and Alex, and Julius agrees to back off from JP and Binky.
140	5	"Well You Haven't Seen My Giant Silver Ostrich"	7 November 2016	60 minutes	788,000
There are doubts in Ollie's mind over his new relationship with Nick, and he's forced to deliver them when the pair go for a romantic day together. Louise is petrified to tell Ryan that she's been in contact with her ex-boyfriend, and is left reeling when he doesn't react the way she had hoped. Fred is torn over what to do with Olivia when Jamie pleads him to think about his friendship with Francis. Meanwhile Nick demands answers from Ollie over their break-up, Ryan accepts Louise's apology, and Fred goes against his better judgement and asks Olivia out on a date.
141	6	"I Don't Care About Quinoa"	14 November 2016	60 minutes	747,000
Louise notices a rift between Sam and Tiff so desperately attempts to get her brother's relationship back on track, but her meddling isn't appreciated. Toff offers an outsiders opinion much to the anger of Tiff. Elsewhere Francis feels betrayed by Fred after hearing he's kissed Olivia, and Jamie fears the living arrangements with Frankie could spell trouble for them. Olivia confronts Francis for getting inside Fred's head, whilst Jamie is forced to admit to Frankie that he thinks she should move out. Julius admits he may still carry a torch for Binky.
142	7	"Get Off Your High Horse"	21 November 2016	60 minutes	688,000
JP flips when he finds out that Binky has been flirting with Julius on a night out and leaving him messages, but she feels all of the rumours have been blown out of proportion. Frankie realises that Jamie isn't being entirely honest with her following a conversation with Alex and Emily. Francis finally clears the air with Fred and gives him the green light to go with Olivia, whilst Jamie rages with Alex for telling Frankie the truth. JP feels he needs to take a step back from his relationship with Binky, Toff and Tiff continue to bicker, and Julius hears some home truths from Sam.
143	8	"I'm Wearing His Boxers Today And They're Enormous"	28 November 2016	60 minutes	645,000
Binky takes a break from Chelsea in order to clear her head. Sam is stuck in an impossible situation as Tiff and Toff's feud reaches another level, and Stephanie asks Julius out on a date. Following some tough love from Rosie and Louise, Binky fears she's lost the support of her friends so visits her Mum for solace. Jamie and Frankie finally make progress with their relationship, whilst Sam encourages Tiff and Toff to go out for coffee together to attempt to clear the air. Elsewhere JP admits that he's happier without Binky.
144	9	"My Libido Is Going Bang Right Now"	5 December 2016	60 minutes	752,000
JP decides to cut all contact with Binky in an attempt to let her go. Jess dampens Toff's spirits by disagreeing with her new found friendship with Tiff feeling they're both being disingenuous. Stephanie enjoys a successful date with Julius before swiftly ending their brief fling after discovering his age. Binky amends things with Rosie and Louise having realised they're only looking out for her, whilst Olivia and Fred make things official. Jess lashes out and gives Toff an ultimatum; the choice between their friendship or her friendship with Tiff.
145	10	"I'm On A Bratwurst Hunt"	12 December 2016	60 minutes	775,000
Fred takes Olivia to Vienna for his violin recital, but as the invites spread it's not long before new rivals Tiff and Julius come face-to-face without the other knowing they'd be there. Louise is furious to learn that Stephanie has decided to seek fitness advice from Ryan and forbids him from being her personal trainer. Elsewhere Jess is distraught to find out that Toff has gone to Vienna with the girls, whilst Sam refuses to accept the olive branch offered by Julius. Elsewhere Olivia and Fred share the news that they're now boyfriend and girlfriend, and Alex comforts Jess.
146	11	"You Didn't Put Any Breathing Holes In Here"	19 December 2016	60 minutes	861,000
Sam and Tiff surprise their friends by their choice of Christmas card, whilst Louise reels from another argument with Ryan. Stephanie gives Alex a huge surprise but he's taken even further aback when she confesses her feelings towards him. Jamie is torn over the perfect gift to get Frankie, and Sam gives Tiff a key to his house. After seeing Binky coseying up to JP again, Ollie puts his rivalry aside to support his friend. Alex agrees to give Stephanie a chance, Ryan and Louise make peace, and Akin admits he may have a thing for Rosie.
–	–	"Christmas Party"	26 December 2016	60 minutes	426,000
Presented by Rick Edwards, the cast reunite to discuss events from the series.

== Ratings ==
Episode	Date	Official E4 rating	E4 weekly rank
Episode 1	10 October 2016	694,000	6
Episode 2	17 October 2016	798,000	6
Episode 3	24 October 2016	845,000	7
Episode 4	31 October 2016	853,000	6
Episode 5	7 November 2016	788,000	7
Episode 6	14 November 2016	747,000	7
Episode 7	21 November 2016	688,000	7
Episode 8	28 November 2016	645,000	7
Episode 9	5 December 2016	752,000	7
Episode 10	12 December 2016	775,000	6
Episode 11	19 December 2016	861,000	4
Christmas Party	26 December 2016	426,000	9
Average		768,000	6
