= The House of Obsessive Compulsives =

The House of Obsessive Compulsives is a 2005 television documentary broadcast by Channel 4 in the United Kingdom. The programme comprised two 60 minute episodes, broadcast on 1 August 2005 and 8 August 2005.

The programme follows three people with long-term and life disrupting obsessive–compulsive disorder (OCD) who agree to move into a house together to undertake psychotherapeutic treatment. The intensive therapy is delivered by a team of psychotherapists from the London's Maudsley Hospital over a period of nine days in an attempt to cure their problems.

The House of Obsessive Compulsives was produced by Monkey Kingdom.
