= Fist of Zen =

American game show

Fist of Zen is an MTV reality game show. It was modeled after the "Silent Library" segment from the Japanese comedy show Downtown no Gaki no Tsukai ya Arahende!!

Fist of Zen was produced by Monkey Kingdom.

== Plot ==
The show consists of a team of 5 people (usually British males between 20 and 30 years old but sometimes females), under the supervision of a Japanese man, called the Zen master, played by actor Peter Law, and voiced by actor Silas Hawkins who assigns them rituals they must accomplish to allegedly reach Zen enlightenment.

The show consists of nine "Zen rituals", each of which presents the victim with some form of pain or discomfort, and must be completed in silence, and sometimes in a given period of time.

Each ritual is first presented by its name, which more or less describes the task to be performed, and how many times and/or in what period of time.

The participants then appear seated at a table. They must then get their hand in a cardboard box put in the middle of the table, and get a ball out of it. In the box there are four red balls and a black one. He who gets the black ball out, is deemed to be the one to perform the ritual. In one season, the balls were replaced with hand fans, where four had a fist on them, and one had a hand giving the finger.

After the completion of each ritual, the Zen master, who is supposedly monitoring the participants progress through the so-called "fountain of Lin Ui", appears and comments on the participants' performance, be it praising them for their success or bashing them for their failure. Each passed ritual accumulates 100 English pounds into a so-called "pot".

After they have gone through all nine rituals, the "westerners" are presented with the "60-Second Serpent Snatch". In this final test, they have to complete some task while their penises (the so-called "Snakes") are being pulled (supposedly by the Zen master) with a string that has been tied to them. In at least one occasion, a girl was part of the Westerners' group, so at the final challenge, she was pulled from two strings by her nipples instead.

The task to accomplish can be one of four, varying from show to show:

- Using chopsticks, each one of them must put an egg from a bowl into a little cup. In this test, those who finish putting their own eggs into the cups seem to be allowed to help others with theirs.
- They are given special helmets with a funnel and a ball hanging by a cord, and by moving their head, they must get the ball into the said funnel.
- By holding spoons in their mouths, they must pass on lemons to the one next to them, in order to get one (sometimes two) lemons in a bowl at the end of the line.
- They are given headbands with a fishing rod-like contraption, and have to get rubber ducks out of a water filled case, using the movement of their heads.

If they succeed in the final challenge, they win all of the accumulated money, while if they fail, they lose it all.

== Zen words of enlightenment ==
About every three rituals, the boys look up to the Zen master and ask for their counseling. At that point, the Zen master is shown giving supposedly profound advice to reach enlightenment, which is usually totally random nonsense. The participants are then shown thanking him for his words.

At the end of the show, the Zen master gives some final words, after which he is revealed to speak English (which he hadn't during all the show), and to be on a chroma key screen, with all the backgrounds being a montage.
