= List of Made in Chelsea episodes =

The following is a list of episodes for the British reality television show Made in Chelsea that first aired on E4 on 9 May 2011 and has so far aired 18 main series and a further 6 spin-off series. Series 19 began broadcasting on 23 March 2020.

As of June 17, 2019, 231 episodes of Made in Chelsea have aired. 13 specials have also aired, including eight End of Season Party episodes, the 100th episode special, "The Aftermath" special, "Big Christmas Quiz" special, "Christmas Ding Dong" special and the "Christmas Party" special.

== Series overview ==
| Series | Episodes | Originally released | |
| Series | Episodes | First released | Last released |
|---|---|---|---|
| 1 | 8 | 9 May 2011 | 27 June 2011 |
| 2 | 11 | 19 September 2011 | 22 December 2011 |
| 3 | 10 | 2 April 2012 | 4 June 2012 |
| 4 | 11 | 15 October 2012 | 24 December 2012 |
| 5 | 11 | 8 April 2013 | 17 June 2013 |
| 6 | 11 | 14 October 2013 | 23 December 2013 |
| 7 | 11 | 7 April 2014 | 16 June 2014 |
| NYC | 6 | 10 August 2014 | 14 September 2014 |
| 8 | 11 | 13 October 2014 | 22 December 2014 |
| 9 | 11 | 13 April 2015 | 22 June 2015 |
| LA | 6 | 10 August 2015 | 14 September 2015 |
| 10 | 11 | 19 October 2015 | 28 December 2015 |
| 11 | 11 | 11 April 2016 | 20 June 2016 |
| SoF | 6 | 1 August 2016 | 5 September 2016 |
| 12 | 11 | 10 October 2016 | 19 December 2016 |
| 13 | 11 | 20 March 2017 | 29 May 2017 |
| IBZ | 6 | 31 July 2017 | 4 September 2017 |
| 14 | 11 | 9 October 2017 | 18 December 2017 |
| 15 | 11 | 12 March 2018 | 21 May 2018 |
| CRO | 6 | 6 August 2018 | 10 September 2018 |
| 16 | 11 | 8 October 2018 | 17 December 2018 |
| 17 | 13 | 25 March 2019 | 17 June 2019 |
| 18 | 11 | 2 September 2019 | 11 November 2019 |
| BA | 4 | 9 December 2019 | 30 December 2019 |
| 19 | 6 | 23 March 2020 | 27 April 2020 |
| 20 | 12 | 28 September 2020 | 7 December 2020 |
| 21 | 12 | 29 March 2021 | 14 June 2021 |
| 22 | 12 | 11 October 2021 | 27 December 2021 |
| 23 | 10 | 4 April 2022 | 6 June 2022 |
| MAL | 5 | 22 August 2022 | 26 August 2022 |
| 24 | 10 | 17 October 2022 | 19 December 2022 |
| BAL | 5 | 20 December 2022 | 26 December 2022 |
| 25 | 11 | 27 March 2023 | 29 May 2023 |
| COR | 5 | 13 August 2023 | 17 August 2023 |
| 26 | 10 | 9 October 2023 | 11 December 2023 |
| SYD | 5 | 18 December 2023 | 22 December 2023 |
| 27 | 10 | 15 April 2024 | 10 June 2024 |
| BON | 10 | 23 September 2024 | 15 October 2024 |
| 28 | 10 | 21 October 2024 | 16 December 2024 |
| 29 | 10 | 31 March 2025 | TBA |

== Series 1 (2011) ==
| No. overall | No. in season | Title | Original release date | Duration | UK viewers |
|---|---|---|---|---|---|
| 1 | 1 | "Ad Victorem Spolias – To The Victor Go The Spoils" | 9 May 2011 | 60 minutes | 583,000 |
| 2 | 2 | "Quick, Let's Have A Quickie" | 16 May 2011 | 60 minutes | 621,000 |
| 3 | 3 | "I'm So Honest With Everyone, Maybe It's A Downfall" | 23 May 2011 | 60 minutes | 639,000 |
| 4 | 4 | "Do I Look Like Jesus?" | 30 May 2011 | 60 minutes | 503,000 |
| 5 | 5 | "Take Your Passion, Make It Happen" | 6 June 2011 | 60 minutes | 651,000 |
| 6 | 6 | "Problems Not Solutions, That's The Way I Live My Life" | 13 June 2011 | 60 minutes | 791,000 |
| 7 | 7 | "Payback's A Bitch" | 20 June 2011 | 60 minutes | 734,000 |
| 8 | 8 | "I Find It The Biggest Turn On That He's Shouting At Me" | 27 June 2011 | 60 minutes | 718,000 |

== Series 2 (2011) ==
| No. overall | No. in season | Title | Original release date | Duration | UK viewers |
|---|---|---|---|---|---|
| 9 | 1 | "Capitalism Makes You Beautiful" | 19 September 2011 | 60 minutes | 504,000 |
| 10 | 2 | "When I Was Younger I Experimented With Clingfilm" | 26 September 2011 | 60 minutes | 530,000 |
| 11 | 3 | "Babe, You're Attituding At Me" | 3 October 2011 | 60 minutes | 486,000 |
| 12 | 4 | "No One Likes A Banjo" | 10 October 2011 | 60 minutes | 533,000 |
| 13 | 5 | "My Mum Sometimes Calls Me Football Head" | 17 October 2011 | 60 minutes | 548,000 |
| 14 | 6 | "Voulez-Vous Coucher Avec Moi?" | 24 October 2011 | 60 minutes | 759,000 |
| 15 | 7 | "You've Gotta Level The Playing Field" | 31 October 2011 | 60 minutes | 613,000 |
| 16 | 8 | "How Do They Find Flamingo Roadkill?" | 7 November 2011 | 60 minutes | 640,000 |
| 17 | 9 | "Je Suis Amoreuse De Toi" | 14 November 2011 | 60 minutes | 667,000 |
| 18 | 10 | "Here's To Friendship" | 21 November 2011 | 60 minutes | 698,000 |
| – | – | "End of Season Party" | 28 November 2011 | 60 minutes | N/A |
| 19 | 11 | "Christmas Is About Giving And Forgiving" | 22 December 2011 | 90 minutes | N/A |

== Series 3 (2012) ==
| No. overall | No. in season | Title | Original release date | Duration | UK viewers |
|---|---|---|---|---|---|
| 20 | 1 | "When You're Part of the Party, You Never Want the Party to Stop" | 2 April 2012 | 60 minutes | 905,000 |
| 21 | 2 | "What's Mine Is Mine and What's Yours We Share" | 9 April 2012 | 60 minutes | 534,000 |
| 22 | 3 | "Sabotage Is Not Chic" | 16 April 2012 | 60 minutes | 676,000 |
| 23 | 4 | "What's the Point of a Point to Point" | 23 April 2012 | 60 minutes | 762,000 |
| 24 | 5 | "I'm Not Really That Gay at All" | 30 April 2012 | 60 minutes | 722,000 |
| 25 | 6 | "Until The Book's Closed It's Open" | 7 May 2012 | 60 minutes | 795,000 |
| 26 | 7 | "Karma's A Bitch" | 14 May 2012 | 60 minutes | 864,000 |
| 27 | 8 | "Everyone Has Skeletons In Their Closet" | 21 May 2012 | 60 minutes | 857,000 |
| 28 | 9 | "It's Called Dessert And Apparently It's Sucking Richard's Face" | 28 May 2012 | 60 minutes | 1,059,000 |
| 29 | 10 | "At The End Of The Day, I've Got The Crazy Title. No One Can Steal That From Me" | 4 June 2012 | 60 minutes | 670,000 |
| – | – | ""End of Season Party"" | 11 June 2012 | 60 minutes | 757,000 |

== Series 4 (2012) ==
| No. overall | No. in season | Title | Original release date | Duration | UK viewers |
|---|---|---|---|---|---|
| 30 | 1 | "If You Want To Crack On And Go Head To Head... You'll F****** Lose" | 15 October 2012 | 60 minutes | 757,000 |
| 31 | 2 | "The More You Can't Have Someone... You Want Them More" | 22 October 2012 | 60 minutes | 685,000 |
| 32 | 3 | "No One You Want At A Party Is Going To Turn Up To A Themed Party, Unless It's Versailles" | 29 October 2012 | 60 minutes | 616,000 |
| 33 | 4 | "I Could Fall In Love With You So Easily.." | 5 November 2012 | 60 minutes | 734,000 |
| 34 | 5 | "A Man At 23 Is A Bit Like A Girl At 15" | 12 November 2012 | 60 minutes | 677,000 |
| 35 | 6 | "They're Wriggly Little Buggers" | 19 November 2012 | 60 minutes | 649,000 |
| 36 | 7 | "I Think You've Got The Costume Wrong Tonight Because It's Not Fresh Prince Of Bel-Air" | 26 November 2012 | 60 minutes | 754,000 |
| 37 | 8 | "I'd Rather Die Than Be Friends With Her" | 3 December 2012 | 60 minutes | 648,000 |
| 38 | 9 | "If I Wanted To Sleep With Other Girls, I Could" | 10 December 2012 | 60 minutes | 744,000 |
| 39 | 10 | "I Used To Charge Younger Boys For Bunny Cuddles" | 17 December 2012 | 60 minutes | 819,000 |
| 40 | 11 | "I Didn't Know Reindeers Actually Existed. I Thought They Were, Like, A Mythical Creature" | 24 December 2012 | 60 minutes | 746,000 |
| – | – | ""End of Season Party"" | 31 December 2012 | 60 minutes | N/A |

== Series 5 (2013) ==
| No. overall | No. in season | Title | Original release date | Duration | UK viewers |
|---|---|---|---|---|---|
| 41 | 1 | "I Made A Mistake That I Wanted To Cover Up" | 8 April 2013 | 60 minutes | 956,000 |
| 42 | 2 | "I Am Not A Robot" | 15 April 2013 | 60 minutes | 884,000 |
| 43 | 3 | "Of Course I'm Going To Say I'm Straight" | 22 April 2013 | 60 minutes | 839,000 |
| 44 | 4 | "He Is Being A Tit" | 29 April 2013 | 60 minutes | 824,000 |
| 45 | 5 | "Kill Jamie, Marry Andy, Kiss Spencer" | 6 May 2013 | 60 minutes | 872,000 |
| 46 | 6 | "I Wouldn't Want My Daughter Going Out With Spencer Matthews" | 13 May 2013 | 60 minutes | 846,000 |
| 47 | 7 | "Is He A Fantastic Lay?" | 20 May 2013 | 60 minutes | 913,000 |
| 48 | 8 | "See You Later, Spenny" | 27 May 2013 | 60 minutes | 847,000 |
| 49 | 9 | "It's Very Rare To Find Someone Who Hasn't F*cked One Of Your Friends" | 3 June 2013 | 60 minutes | 927,000 |
| 50 | 10 | "Hot Tubs Are Like My Nemesis" | 10 June 2013 | 60 minutes | 1,069,000 |
| 51 | 11 | "She's Becoming Spencer" | 17 June 2013 | 60 minutes | 895,000 |
| – | – | ""End of Season Party"" | 24 June 2013 | 60 minutes | 725,000 |

== Series 6 (2013) ==
| No. overall | No. in season | Title | Original release date | Duration | UK viewers |
|---|---|---|---|---|---|
| 52 | 1 | "I'd Have Sex With Any Of My Exes" | 14 October 2013 | 60 minutes | 870,000 |
| 53 | 2 | "Your Friends Are All Pretty Rude" | 21 October 2013 | 60 minutes | 890,000 |
| 54 | 3 | "If You Are Going To Play Two Girls, It's Best To Play Two Who Don't Know Each Other" | 28 October 2013 | 60 minutes | 893,000 |
| 55 | 4 | "I Once Knew Someone Who Had A Sleeping Bag" | 4 November 2013 | 60 minutes | 868,000 |
| 56 | 5 | "Your Buds Are Way More Important Than Any Girl" | 11 November 2013 | 60 minutes | 884,000 |
| 57 | 6 | "Willies Aren't Such A Big Thing, We All Know That" | 18 November 2013 | 60 minutes | 859,000 |
| 58 | 7 | "You Need to Get Under Someone to Get Over Someone" | 25 November 2013 | 60 minutes | 1,040,000 |
| 59 | 8 | "Let's Go For A Drink, Maybe Some Fondling" | 2 December 2013 | 60 minutes | 938,000 |
| 60 | 9 | "Fancy A Bit Of African Holiday Sex?" | 9 December 2013 | 60 minutes | 782,000 |
| 61 | 10 | "If You Knew Everything I'd Be In Deep Deep Trouble" | 16 December 2013 | 60 minutes | 981,000 |
| 62 | 11 | "Miracles Happen At Christmas" | 23 December 2013 | 60 minutes | 1,102,000 |
| – | – | ""End of Season Party"" | 30 December 2013 | 60 minutes | 764,000 |

== Series 7 (2014) ==
| No. overall | No. in season | Title | Original release date | Duration | UK viewers |
|---|---|---|---|---|---|
| 63 | 1 | "There's Gonna Be A Storm" | 7 April 2014 | 60 minutes | 1,135,000 |
| 64 | 2 | "Doesn't Everyone Have Secrets?" | 14 April 2014 | 60 minutes | 1,079,000 |
| 65 | 3 | "People Think I Look Like Karl Lagerfeld" | 21 April 2014 | 60 minutes | 1,202,000 |
| 66 | 4 | "There's Difference Between Bro Code And Being-A-D*ck Code" | 28 April 2014 | 60 minutes | 1,113,000 |
| 67 | 5 | "If Your D*ck's Working, Your Head's Working" | 5 May 2014 | 60 minutes | 1,189,000 |
| 68 | 6 | "I Want To Be In Everyone's Breast Pocket, Caressing Half Of London's Nipples" | 12 May 2014 | 60 minutes | 1,096,000 |
| 69 | 7 | "Everyone Loves A Toff" | 19 May 2014 | 60 minutes | 1,144,000 |
| 70 | 8 | "I Was Sucked Into A World I Didn't Know" | 26 May 2014 | 60 minutes | 1,131,000 |
| 71 | 9 | "You're Like A Fat Tom Daley" | 2 June 2014 | 60 minutes | 1,266,000 |
| 72 | 10 | "When Are We Getting Married?" | 9 June 2014 | 60 minutes | 1,074,000 |
| 73 | 11 | "I Tried So Bad, I Even Got Naked" | 16 June 2014 | 60 minutes | 1,087,000 |

== NYC (2014) ==
| No. overall | No. in season | Title | Original release date | Duration | UK viewers |
|---|---|---|---|---|---|
| 74 | 1 | "American Girls Are Much More Open And Willing To Try New Things" | 10 August 2014 | 60 minutes | 974,000 |
| 75 | 2 | "Even The Promiscuous Animals Would Like A Shot At Love" | 17 August 2014 | 60 minutes | 1,200,000 |
| 76 | 3 | "I Will Not Be Hot Dogged!" | 24 August 2014 | 60 minutes | 987,000 |
| 77 | 4 | "Do Not Involve Me In Your Slutty Board Game" | 31 August 2014 | 60 minutes | 1,095,000 |
| 78 | 5 | "Always Remember Boys, Persistence Is Key" | 7 September 2014 | 60 minutes | 819,000 |
| 79 | 6 | "Everyone's Hooking Up With Everybody" | 14 September 2014 | 60 minutes | 1,058,000 |

== Series 8 (2014) ==
| No. overall | No. in season | Title | Original release date | Duration | UK viewers |
|---|---|---|---|---|---|
| 80 | 1 | "What Happens In New York, Doesn't Stay In New York" | 13 October 2014 | 60 minutes | 997,000 |
| 81 | 2 | "You Snooze, You Lose" | 20 October 2014 | 60 minutes | TBA |
| 82 | 3 | "Prudders Is A Beast" | 27 October 2014 | 60 minutes | 929,000 |
| 83 | 4 | "I'm Not Seasonal, I'm A Timeless Classic" | 3 November 2014 | 60 minutes | 1,030,000 |
| 84 | 5 | "Get Out Of The Friend Zone And Kiss Her" | 10 November 2014 | 60 minutes | 1,010,000 |
| 85 | 6 | "We Could Die Tonight So Let's All Try To Be Happy" | 17 November 2014 | 60 minutes | 839,000 |
| 86 | 7 | "Welcome To My Playpen" | 24 November 2014 | 60 minutes | 960,000 |
| 87 | 8 | "Someone Needs To Watch The Sheep When The Shepherd's Away" | 1 December 2014 | 60 minutes | 921,000 |
| 88 | 9 | "It's Like Looking At Bambi Before She Gets Shot" | 8 December 2014 | 60 minutes | 870,000 |
| 89 | 10 | "You Need To Grow Up And Be A Man, Period!" | 15 December 2014 | 60 minutes | 1,115,000 |
| 90 | 11 | "Do You Know What Carrying Around My Past Does To People?" | 22 December 2014 | 60 minutes | 951,000 |
| – | – | ""End of Season Party"" | 29 December 2014 | 60 minutes | 786,000 |

== Series 9 (2015) ==
| No. overall | No. in season | Title | Original release date | Duration | UK viewers |
|---|---|---|---|---|---|
| 91 | 1 | "Let's Go And Get More Tanned" | 13 April 2015 | 60 minutes | 889,000 |
| 92 | 2 | "They Were Literally Just Force Feeding Us Relationship Foie Gras" | 20 April 2015 | 60 minutes | 788,000 |
| 93 | 3 | "Oh My God, Tonsil Tennis Galore" | 27 April 2015 | 60 minutes | 722,000 |
| 94 | 4 | "I Don't Want Two Girlfriends, I Want One Girlfriend" | 4 May 2015 | 60 minutes | 877,000 |
| 95 | 5 | "I Find It Impossible Not To Think About The Terracotta" | 11 May 2015 | 60 minutes | 851,000 |
| 96 | 6 | "The Last Time I Saw Him I Was Naked In A Forest" | 18 May 2015 | 60 minutes | 838,000 |
| 97 | 7 | "She's Coming Round To My House For Cocktails And A Bit Of Foreplay" | 25 May 2015 | 60 minutes | 849,000 |
| 98 | 8 | "What A Mortifying Insight Into People's Choice Of Nightwear" | 1 June 2015 | 60 minutes | 908,000 |
| 99 | 9 | "There Are Two Types Of People In The World; Radiators And Drains" | 8 June 2015 | 60 minutes | 698,000 |
| – | – | "100th Episode Special" | 15 June 2015 | 60 minutes | – |
| 100 | 10 | "A Surprise Awaits Below The Surface" | 15 June 2015 | 60 minutes | 714,000 |
| 101 | 11 | "Relationships Shouldn't Be Stressful" | 22 June 2015 | 60 minutes | 816,000 |

== LA (2015) ==
| No. overall | No. in season | Title | Original release date | Duration | UK viewers |
|---|---|---|---|---|---|
| 102 | 1 | "I'm So L.A. I Don't Get Sarcasm" | 10 August 2015 | 60 minutes | 780,000 |
| 103 | 2 | "Are Feet Like A Big Attraction Over Here?" | 17 August 2015 | 60 minutes | 924,000 |
| 104 | 3 | "I Promise To Be Your Priscilla Tonight" | 24 August 2015 | 60 minutes | 869,000 |
| 105 | 4 | "Our Group Of Friends All Sleep In Each Other's Beds" | 31 August 2015 | 60 minutes | 831,000 |
| 106 | 5 | "You Only Like Each Other When You're Not Supposed To" | 7 September 2015 | 60 minutes | 939,000 |
| 107 | 6 | "The Secret's Out Now" | 14 September 2015 | 60 minutes | 905,000 |

== Series 10 (2015) ==
| No. overall | No. in season | Title | Original release date | Duration | UK viewers |
|---|---|---|---|---|---|
| 108 | 1 | "No One Ever Kicks Me Out of Bed" | 19 October 2015 | 60 minutes | 844,000 |
| 109 | 2 | "You Look Like A Unicorn" | 26 October 2015 | 60 minutes | 910,000 |
| 110 | 3 | "You're Digging Yourself A Grave" | 2 November 2015 | 60 minutes | 967,000 |
| 111 | 4 | "He Lives And Breathes Vagina" | 9 November 2015 | 60 minutes | 986,000 |
| 112 | 5 | "I've Heard He's Quite A Thorough Lover" | 16 November 2015 | 60 minutes | 677,000 |
| 113 | 6 | "You Don't Get Anywhere In Life Without Visualising The End Goal" | 23 November 2015 | 60 minutes | 856,000 |
| 114 | 7 | "We Were Like Two Peas In A Pod, And Now I'm Just One Pea" | 30 November 2015 | 60 minutes | 671 000 |
| 115 | 8 | "I Feel Like I've Been Put In A Naughty Corner" | 7 December 2015 | 60 minutes | 963,000 |
| 116 | 9 | "I'm All Over The Place Right Now, Emotionally And Florally" | 14 December 2015 | 60 minutes | 733,000 |
| 117 | 10 | "There's A Jamie Shaped Hole In My Life" | 21 December 2015 | 60 minutes | 818,000 |
| 118 | 11 | "He’s Making An Armageddon Of Mistakes" | 28 December 2015 | 60 minutes | 838,000 |
| – | – | "End of Season Party" | 4 January 2016 | 60 minutes | 615,000 |

== Series 11 (2016) ==
| No. overall | No. in season | Title | Original release date | Duration | UK viewers |
|---|---|---|---|---|---|
| 119 | 1 | "I Used To Snog Girls In The Towel Cupboard... Naked" | 11 April 2016 | 60 minutes | 907,000 |
| 120 | 2 | "Everyone Dates Everyone... That's Just What We Do" | 18 April 2016 | 60 minutes | 962,000 |
| 121 | 3 | "My Mum Likes Getting Her Boobs Out When She's Drunk, It's Fine" | 25 April 2016 | 60 minutes | 801,000 |
| 122 | 4 | "It's So Hard Talking To Someone Whose Face Doesn't Move" | 2 May 2016 | 60 minutes | 900,000 |
| 123 | 5 | "Why Am I Keeping All Your Secrets?" | 9 May 2016 | 60 minutes | 989,000 |
| 124 | 6 | "You Need To Find Someone Who Is Weird, Who You Can Be Weird With" | 16 May 2016 | 60 minutes | 978,000 |
| 125 | 7 | "I Was Considering Nipple Tassles" | 23 May 2016 | 60 minutes | 824,000 |
| 126 | 8 | "Go Get The Girl" | 30 May 2016 | 60 minutes | 949,000 |
| 127 | 9 | "Once A Cheat, Always A Cheat" | 6 June 2016 | 60 minutes | 970,000 |
| 128 | 10 | "One Normally Has A Different Tea Service For Every Room" | 13 June 2016 | 60 minutes | 812,000 |
| 129 | 11 | "Marry The Idiot" | 20 June 2016 | 60 minutes | 707,000 |
| – | – | "The Aftermath" | 27 June 2016 | 60 minutes | 602,000 |

== South of France (2016) ==
| No. overall | No. in season | Title | Original release date | Duration | UK viewers |
|---|---|---|---|---|---|
| 130 | 1 | "I’m Going To Wear Bikini And Heels, ‘Cos I’m On A Yacht And I’m In The South Of France" | 1 August 2016 | 60 minutes | 738,000 |
| 131 | 2 | "Do You Remember It, Or Did You Blackout?" | 8 August 2016 | 60 minutes | 627,000 |
| 132 | 3 | "I Did Not Have Sexual Relations With That Woman" | 15 August 2016 | 60 minutes | 664,000 |
| 133 | 4 | "I Want My Girl Back" | 22 August 2016 | 60 minutes | 758,000 |
| 134 | 5 | "I Always Wear My Kaftan In Monaco" | 29 August 2016 | 60 minutes | 913,000 |
| 135 | 6 | "Au Revoir Francois" | 5 September 2016 | 60 minutes | 907,000 |

== Series 12 (2016) ==
| No. overall | No. in season | Title | Original release date | Duration | UK viewers |
|---|---|---|---|---|---|
| 136 | 1 | "I Genuinely Believe He Thinks He's In A Disney Film" | 10 October 2016 | 60 minutes | 694,000 |
| 137 | 2 | "Every Time Francis Paints A Girl's Heart Is Broken" | 17 October 2016 | 60 minutes | 798,000 |
| 138 | 3 | "You Have Got Naughty Little Thing Written All Over Your Face" | 24 October 2016 | 60 minutes | 845,000 |
| 139 | 4 | "Kanye West, What Is That?" | 31 October 2016 | 60 minutes | 853,000 |
| 140 | 5 | "Well You Haven't Seen My Giant Silver Ostrich" | 7 November 2016 | 60 minutes | 788,000 |
| 141 | 6 | "I Don't Care About Quinoa" | 14 November 2016 | 60 minutes | 747,000 |
| 142 | 7 | "Get Off Your High Horse" | 21 November 2016 | 60 minutes | 688,000 |
| 143 | 8 | "I'm Wearing His Boxers Today And They're Enormous" | 28 November 2016 | 60 minutes | 645,000 |
| 144 | 9 | "My Libido Is Going Bang Right Now" | 5 December 2016 | 60 minutes | 752,000 |
| 145 | 10 | "I'm On A Bratwurst Hunt" | 12 December 2016 | 60 minutes | 775,000 |
| 146 | 11 | "You Didn't Put Any Breathing Holes In Here" | 19 December 2016 | 60 minutes | 861,000 |
| – | – | "Christmas Party" | 26 December 2016 | 60 minutes | 426,000 |

== Series 13 (2017) ==
| No. overall | No. in season | Title | Original release date | Duration | UK viewers |
|---|---|---|---|---|---|
| 147 | 1 | "It’s The Next Chapter" | 20 March 2017 | 60 minutes | 961,000 |
| 148 | 2 | "You Just Crave Sex and Carbs" | 27 March 2017 | 60 minutes | 820,000 |
| 149 | 3 | "Fred, You Have A Girlfriend You Moron" | 3 April 2017 | 60 minutes | 837,000 |
| 150 | 4 | "Homewrecker, One O’Clock" | 10 April 2017 | 60 minutes | 805,000 |
| 151 | 5 | "It Looks Like You Are Obsessed With Me" | 17 April 2017 | 60 minutes | 740,000 |
| 152 | 6 | "He Said They Didn’t Kiss, He Said They Fondled" | 24 April 2017 | 60 minutes | 814,000 |
| 153 | 7 | "If I Could Punch You In The Face I Would" | 1 May 2017 | 60 minutes | 835,000 |
| 154 | 8 | "Marriage Is Inevitable" | 8 May 2017 | 60 minutes | 772,000 |
| 155 | 9 | "Mate, I Got Myself In A Little Bit Of A Situation" | 15 May 2017 | 60 minutes | 870,000 |
| 156 | 10 | "I’m Not This Good A Liar" | 22 May 2017 | 60 minutes | 817,000 |
| 157 | 11 | "This Is Not A Baby Shower, This Is A Fricking Carnival" | 29 May 2017 | 60 minutes | 757,000 |

== Ibiza (2017) ==
| No. overall | No. in season | Title | Original release date | Duration | UK viewers |
|---|---|---|---|---|---|
| 158 | 1 | "I Don’t Have A Problem With The Bloke, I Just Think His Girlfriend’s Hot" | 31 July 2017 | 60 minutes | 808,000 |
| 159 | 2 | "I’m Doing Things I’ve Never Done Before And I’m Loving It" | 7 August 2017 | 60 minutes | 666,000 |
| 160 | 3 | "He’s Been Living In La La Land Out Here" | 14 August 2017 | 60 minutes | 837,000 |
| 161 | 4 | "She’s A Black Widow" | 21 August 2017 | 60 minutes | 764,000 |
| 162 | 5 | "You More Than Anybody Knows A Good Rebound" | 28 August 2017 | 60 minutes | 766,000 |
| 163 | 6 | "Just A Friendly Reminder, Breaks Don’t Work" | 4 September 2017 | 60 minutes | 803,000 |

== Series 14 (2017) ==
| No. overall | No. in season | Title | Original release date | Duration | UK viewers |
|---|---|---|---|---|---|
| 164 | 1 | "I Don’t Like Vegans, I Don’t Like Feminists And I Don’t Like People Who Are Gluten Free" | 9 October 2017 | 60 minutes | 689,000 |
| 165 | 2 | "It’s Just Difficult To Tell Your Friends What’s Going On" | 16 October 2017 | 60 minutes | 678,000 |
| 166 | 3 | "Our Future Is Doomed" | 23 October 2017 | 60 minutes | 716,000 |
| 167 | 4 | "The Boy Learnt To Walk In Loaffers, He Will Probably Die Wearing His Loaffers" | 30 October 2017 | 60 minutes | 729,000 |
| 168 | 5 | "I Don’t Think You Can Have A Proper Relationship Until You’ve Had Your Heart Broken" | 6 November 2017 | 60 minutes | 735,000 |
| 169 | 6 | "Aluminium Is Not Really My Style" | 13 November 2017 | 60 minutes | 831,000 |
| 170 | 7 | "We Don’t Need To Go Down Memory Lane Dude" | 20 November 2017 | 60 minutes | 631,000 |
| 171 | 8 | "I Won’t Have A Buffet Until I’m Dead" | 27 November 2017 | 60 minutes | 649,000 |
| 172 | 9 | "Two Can Play At That Game" | 4 December 2017 | 60 minutes | 564,000 |
| 173 | 10 | "I’m More Domesticated Than A Cat" | 11 December 2017 | 60 minutes | 813,000 |
| 174 | 11 | "Who Do You Think Deserves A Good Whipping This Year?”" | 18 December 2017 | 60 minutes | 750,000 |
| – | – | "Christmas Ding Dong" | 25 December 2017 | 60 minutes | 516,000 |

== Series 15 (2018) ==
| No. overall | No. in season | Title | Original release date | Duration | UK viewers |
|---|---|---|---|---|---|
| 175 | 1 | "I Wanna Know Who She Is And Where She’s Come From" | 12 March 2018 | 60 minutes | 849,000 |
| 176 | 2 | "Mimi Has Got A Boyfriend, Everyone Else Stay Calm" | 19 March 2018 | 60 minutes | 856,000 |
| 177 | 3 | "Honestly, I’ve Never Felt Like This Before" | 26 March 2018 | 60 minutes | 645,000 |
| 178 | 4 | "I’m Tortoise Sitting For My Neighbour" | 2 April 2018 | 60 minutes | 700,000 |
| 179 | 5 | "Therapy Is Therapeutic, This Is Not Therapy" | 9 April 2018 | 60 minutes | 705,000 |
| 180 | 6 | "Don’t Look At Me When You’re Taking Your Pants Off Please" | 16 April 2018 | 60 minutes | 801,000 |
| 181 | 7 | "He Needs A Taste Of His Own Medicine" | 23 April 2018 | 60 minutes | 767,000 |
| 182 | 8 | "I Literally Just Tried To Talk Dirty In Latin" | 30 April 2018 | 60 minutes | 776,000 |
| 183 | 9 | "No One Wants To Shag Just A Personality" | 7 May 2018 | 60 minutes | 740,000 |
| 184 | 10 | "It Is Baller To Be Bad In Bed" | 14 May 2018 | 60 minutes | 860,000 |
| 185 | 11 | "Darling, Sabotage Is Such An Ugly Word" | 21 May 2018 | 60 minutes | 788,000 |
| – | – | "End of Season Party" | 28 May 2018 | 60 minutes | 452,000 |

== Croatia (2018) ==
| No. overall | No. in season | Title | Original release date | Duration | UK viewers |
|---|---|---|---|---|---|
| 186 | 1 | "I'm Like Zeus And He's Hercules" | 6 August 2018 | 60 minutes | 712,000 |
| 187 | 2 | "Take It To The Grave" | 13 August 2018 | 60 minutes | 771,000 |
| 188 | 3 | "You’re A Reptile, Mate" | 20 August 2018 | 60 minutes | 748,000 |
| 189 | 4 | "If You Can’t Remember It, It Never Happened" | 27 August 2018 | 60 minutes | 712,000 |
| 190 | 5 | "Keep Your Friends Close But Keep Your Enemies Closer" | 3 September 2018 | 60 minutes | 746,000 |
| 191 | 6 | "It’s Been A Lovely Setting For Bad Circumstances" | 10 September 2018 | 60 minutes | 715,000 |

== Series 16 (2018) ==
| No. overall | No. in season | Title | Original release date | Duration | UK viewers |
|---|---|---|---|---|---|
| 192 | 1 | "If That’s A Slapped Arse Then Slap Me Now" | 8 October 2018 | 60 minutes | 990,000 |
| 193 | 2 | "I Hate When My Human Side Comes Out" | 15 October 2018 | 60 minutes | 984,000 |
| 194 | 3 | "I Love It When You Get Deep And Dirty" | 22 October 2018 | 60 minutes | 1,098,000 |
| 195 | 4 | "Rule Number One, Never Give Back The Diamonds Darling" | 29 October 2018 | 60 minutes | 1,074,000 |
| 196 | 5 | "I Shan’t Be Climbed" | 5 November 2018 | 60 minutes | 1,073,000 |
| 197 | 6 | "You’re A Beggy Little Bitch" | 12 November 2018 | 60 minutes | 1,005,000 |
| 198 | 7 | "Some Would Say That I’m The King Of A Gesture" | 19 November 2018 | 60 minutes | 994,000 |
| 199 | 8 | "I’m Going To Redeem Myself And Make Sure Everyone Loves Me" | 26 November 2018 | 60 minutes | 926,000 |
| 200 | 9 | "You And I Have Gone Down A Very Dark Track" | 3 December 2018 | 60 minutes | 953,000 |
| 201 | 10 | "I Was Too Blind To Hear It" | 10 December 2018 | 60 minutes | 980,000 |
| 202 | 11 | "I Think The Best Thing About Christmas Is Once It’s All Over" | 17 December 2018 | 60 minutes | 863,000 |
| – | – | "Big Christmas Quiz" | 24 December 2018 | 60 minutes | 521,000 |

== Series 17 (2019) ==
| No. overall | No. in season | Title | Original release date | Duration | UK viewers |
|---|---|---|---|---|---|
| 203 | 1 | "We Do Complicated, Don't We?" | 25 March 2019 | 60 minutes | 750,000 |
| 204 | 2 | "You Showed My Friend’s Mum Your Testicle" | 1 April 2019 | 60 minutes | 767,000 |
| 205 | 3 | "She's Like A Little Slippery Eel" | 8 April 2019 | 60 minutes | 676,000 |
| 206 | 4 | "I Was Like The Funny Nice Douche, He’s Just A Douche" | 15 April 2019 | 60 minutes | 681,000 |
| 207 | 5 | "This Boy Is Getting In Between Our Friendship" | 22 April 2019 | 60 minutes | 583,000 |
| 208 | 6 | "She’s A Very Odd Bird" | 29 April 2019 | 60 minutes | 689,000 |
| 209 | 7 | "Can We Have Another Sexual Revolution Please?”" | 6 May 2019 | 60 minutes | 671,000 |
| 210 | 8 | "I Need To Find A Tree And Feed It Chocolate" | 13 May 2019 | 60 minutes | 717,000 |
| 211 | 9 | "Sometimes When You’re Drunk, The Truth Does Come Out" | 20 May 2019 | 60 minutes | 741,000 |
| 212 | 10 | "Maybe Suck On A Sweet While I Tell You This" | 27 May 2019 | 60 minutes | 789,000 |
| 213 | 11 | "I’m Gonna Meghan Markle Myself" | 3 June 2019 | 60 minutes | 690,000 |
| 214 | 12 | "Some People Are Off Limits" | 10 June 2019 | 60 minutes | 729,000 |
| 215 | 13 | "As Far As The Wrongest Thing You’ve Ever Done, This Ain’t That Bad" | 17 June 2019 | 60 minutes | 721,000 |

== Series 18 (2019) ==
| No. overall | No. in season | Title | Original release date | Duration | UK viewers |
|---|---|---|---|---|---|
| 216 | 1 | "Victoria, I Will Never Die" | 2 September 2019 | 60 minutes | 658,000 |
| 217 | 2 | "Right, I’ve Got A Little Bit Of A Situation" | 9 September 2019 | 60 minutes | 681,000 |
| 218 | 3 | "This Is Something That Chelsea Lacks – Common Decency!" | 16 September 2019 | 60 minutes | 686,000 |
| 219 | 4 | "I’m The Opposite Of A Narcissist" | 23 September 2019 | 60 minutes | 770,000 |
| 220 | 5 | "Who Brought Maeva?" | 30 September 2019 | 60 minutes | 723,000 |
| 221 | 6 | "I Don’t Know How Many More Nails We Can Put In The Coffin" | 7 October 2019 | 60 minutes | 755,000 |
| 222 | 7 | "He Must Be Great In The Sack" | 14 October 2019 | 60 minutes | 750,000 |
| 223 | 8 | "He Needs To Go To Better Lad School" | 21 October 2019 | 60 minutes | 849,000 |
| 224 | 9 | "Let’s Break Some Bread" | 28 October 2019 | 60 minutes | 821,000 |
| 225 | 10 | "If Anyone Could Ride A Lion It’s Tristan" | 4 November 2019 | 60 minutes | 815,000 |
| 226 | 11 | "The Dudelsack Is Out!" | 11 November 2019 | 60 minutes | 803,000 |

== Buenos Aires (2019) ==
| No. overall | No. in season | Title | Original release date | Duration | UK viewers |
|---|---|---|---|---|---|
| 227 | 1 | "Argentina Baby" | 9 December 2019 | 60 minutes | 526,000 |
| 228 | 2 | "I Wish I Was A Narcissist" | 16 December 2019 | 60 minutes | 595,000 |
| 229 | 3 | "I Have A Girlfriend… On Paper" | 23 December 2019 | 60 minutes | 581,000 |
| 230 | 4 | "Let’s Get Married" | 30 December 2019 | 60 minutes | 784,000 |
| – | – | "End of Yah Quiz" | 30 December 2019 | 60 minutes | TBA |

== Series 19 (2020) ==
| No. overall | No. in season | Title | Original release date | Duration | UK viewers |
|---|---|---|---|---|---|
| 231 | 1 | "I Need My Binky Back" | 23 March 2020 | 60 minutes | 907,000 |
| 232 | 2 | "I Like Playing In The Danger Zone" | 30 March 2020 | 60 minutes | 865,000 |
| 233 | 3 | "I Don't Care If It's My Battle Or Not" | 6 April 2020 | 60 minutes | 823,000 |
| 234 | 4 | "If You're Secure In Your Relationship, It Shouldn't Be An Issue" | 13 April 2020 | 60 minutes | 769,000 |
| 235 | 5 | "99% Of The Population Will Understand What I'm Saying" | 20 April 2020 | 60 minutes | 838,000 |
| 236 | 6 | "She Doesn't Trust Him To Be Around Me" | 27 April 2020 | 60 minutes | 807,000 |

== Series 20 (2020) ==
| No. overall | No. in season | Title | Original release date | Duration | UK viewers |
|---|---|---|---|---|---|
| 237 | 1 | "3AM Is Prime Time Booty Call" | 28 September 2020 | 60 minutes | 686,000 |
| 238 | 2 | "You’re Leaving A Couple Of Vipers For Another Couple Of Vipers" | 5 October 2020 | 60 minutes | 722,000 |
| 239 | 3 | "With Great Rig Comes Great Responsibility" | 12 October 2020 | 60 minutes | 721,000 |
| 240 | 4 | "I Did Something Really Bad" | 19 October 2020 | 60 minutes | 728,000 |
| 241 | 5 | "You're My Friend, But I Also Quite Wanna Kiss You" | 26 October 2020 | 60 minutes | 735,000 |
| 242 | 6 | "Once The Sex Is Gone, The Relationship Is Gone" | 2 November 2020 | 60 minutes | 775,000 |
| 243 | 7 | "I Can Get Hard If You Need Me To, Clive" | 9 November 2020 | 60 minutes | 753,000 |
| 244 | 8 | "You Get Angry At The Sound Of Your Own Voice" | 16 November 2020 | 60 minutes | 830,000 |
| 245 | 9 | "Crumbs" | 23 November 2020 | 60 minutes | 860,000 |
| 246 | 10 | "She Just Got A Bit Over Familiar" | 30 November 2020 | 60 minutes | 759,000 |
| 247 | 11 | "Ctrl + Alt + Delete Habbs" | 7 December 2020 | 60 minutes | 748,000 |
| 248 | 12 | "From Thursday… Stay Home. Protect The NHS. Save Lives" | 14 December 2020 | 60 minutes | 3,435,000 |

== Series 21 (2021) ==
| No. overall | No. in season | Title | Original release date | Duration | UK viewers |
|---|---|---|---|---|---|
| 249 | 1 | "It’s Just… Lighting The Match" | 29 March 2021 | 60 minutes | 588,000 |
| 250 | 2 | "Stop Spitting On My Mink!" | 5 April 2021 | 60 minutes | 640,000 |
| 251 | 3 | "Julius Is Nursing A Semi" | 12 April 2021 | 60 minutes | 649,000 |
| 252 | 4 | "I Don’t Play Hard To Get" | 19 April 2021 | 60 minutes | 616,000 |
| 253 | 5 | "I’ve Had More Comfortable Gynaecological Appointments" | 26 April 2021 | 60 minutes | 700,000 |
| 254 | 6 | "The Thing With You Maeva Is You’re Just Slightly Misunderstood" | 3 May 2021 | 60 minutes | 760,000 |
| 255 | 7 | "I’m Coming From A Good Place… For Once" | 10 May 2021 | 60 minutes | 792,000 |
| 256 | 8 | "We Just Had A Nice Friendly Jacuzzi… What’s Up With That?" | 17 May 2021 | 60 minutes | 752,000 |
| 257 | 9 | "I’m Moody, If You’re Broody" | 24 May 2021 | 60 minutes | 763,000 |
| 258 | 10 | "Hurry Up And Break Up With Your Boyfriend" | 31 May 2021 | 60 minutes | 864,000 |
| 259 | 11 | "I Will Skateboard On Your Head" | 7 June 2021 | 60 minutes | 808,000 |
| 260 | 12 | "Prince Charmings Will Come And Go… But I’ll Always Be There" | 14 June 2021 | 60 minutes | 762,000 |

== Series 22 (2021) ==
| No. overall | No. in season | Title | Original release date | Duration | UK viewers |
|---|---|---|---|---|---|
| 261 | 1 | "Did You Miss Me A Little Bit?" | 11 October 2021 | 60 minutes | 868,000 |
| 262 | 2 | "You’re Literally Pouring Gasoline On The Fire" | 18 October 2021 | 60 minutes | 696,000 |
| 263 | 3 | "I Think You’re Dismissed Now" | 25 October 2021 | 60 minutes | 838,000 |
| 264 | 4 | "Trust Is Built In Droplets And Lost In Buckets" | 1 November 2021 | 60 minutes | 806,000 |
| 265 | 5 | "I Want A Man Who Buys Me Diamonds, Not Silver" | 8 November 2021 | 60 minutes | 698,000 |
| 266 | 6 | "My Heart Was Made Into Beef Carpaccio" | 15 November 2021 | 60 minutes | 736,000 |
| 267 | 7 | "If They Get Married I Will Eat My Own Scrotum" | 22 November 2021 | 60 minutes | 699,000 |
| 268 | 8 | "This Is A Very Big Red Flag In Front Of A Very Scary Bull" | 29 November 2021 | 60 minutes | 699,000 |
| 269 | 9 | "I’m Sorry For Having A Moment Of Weakness" | 6 December 2021 | 60 minutes | 695,000 |
| 270 | 10 | "Big Dig Energy" | 13 December 2021 | 60 minutes | 565,000 |
| 271 | 11 | "I Didn’t Realise How Well Endowed You Were" | 20 December 2021 | 60 minutes | 566,000 |
| 272 | 12 | "Secrets Are Good" | 27 December 2021 | 60 minutes | TBA |

== Series 23 (2022) ==
| No. overall | No. in season | Title | Original release date | Duration | UK viewers |
|---|---|---|---|---|---|
| 273 | 1 | "She’s Like A Snake In Sheep’s Clothing" | 4 April 2022 | 60 minutes | TBA |
| 274 | 2 | "I’m Back" | 11 April 2022 | 60 minutes | TBA |
| 275 | 3 | "Fashion Is Repulsive" | 18 April 2022 | 60 minutes | TBA |
| 276 | 4 | "The Truth Always Comes Out" | 25 April 2022 | 60 minutes | TBA |
| 277 | 5 | "I’ll Literally Regret It Forever" | 2 May 2022 | 60 minutes | TBA |
| 278 | 6 | "Let’s Give It Another Go" | 9 May 2022 | 60 minutes | TBA |
| 279 | 7 | "Is There No Decorum Anymore?" | 16 May 2022 | 60 minutes | TBA |
| 280 | 8 | "Silence Speaks Volumes" | 23 May 2022 | 60 minutes | TBA |
| 281 | 9 | "This Is His Worst Nightmare" | 30 May 2022 | 60 minutes | TBA |
| 282 | 10 | "Why Be Kind When You Can Be A Bitch?" | 6 June 2022 | 60 minutes | TBA |

== Series 24 (2022) ==
The twenty-fourth series began airing on 17 October 2022 and concluded after ten episodes on 19 December 2022.

== Bali and Bonjour Baby (2022) ==
Bali series began airing on 20 December 2022 and concluded after five episodes on 26 December 2022.

== Series 25 (2023) ==
The twenty-fifth series began airing on 27 March 2023 and concluded after eleven episodes on 29 May 2023.

== Corsica (2023) ==
Corsica series began airing on 13 August 2023 and concluded after 5 episodes.

== Series 26 (2023) ==
The twenty-sixth series began airing on 9 October 2023.

== Sydney (2023) ==
Made in Chelsea: Sydney began airing in December 2023.

== Series 27 (2024) ==
Series 27 began airing in April 2024 and finished in June 2024, concluding the ten episodes.
