= Made in Chelsea series 13 =

Made in Chelsea
- Series 13
- No. of episodes: 11

Release
- Original network: E4
- Original release: 20 March – 29 May 2017

Series chronology
- ← Previous; Series 12 Next → Ibiza

The thirteenth series of Made in Chelsea, a British structured-reality television programme began airing on 20 March 2017 on E4 and concluded on 29 May 2017 following eleven episodes. Ahead of the series, cast members Binky Felstead and Josh "JP" Patterson announced they were expecting a child. New cast members for this series include Daisy Robins, Ella Willis, Harry Baron, Mimi Bouchard and Sam Prince. Love Island contestant Tina Stinnes also made a brief return to the series having previously appearing in the seventh series of the show. This was the final series to feature original cast member Alexandra "Binky" Felstead, as well as Josh "JP" Patterson and Ollie Locke, who also announced their departures from the show. This episode also included the one-off return of Francesa "Cheska" Hull as she attended Binky's baby shower. It was also the last series to include cast members Akin Solanke-Caulker, Rosie Fortescue and Stephanie Pratt who did not return for fourteenth series. The series heavily focused on the rift between Jamie and Frankie following a number of obstacles getting in their way, the end of Olivia and Fredrik's relationship when his attention sways elsewhere, and JP and Binky planning their future with the imminent arrival of their baby. It also included Louise and Ryan taking their relationship to the next step, and Julius and Ella facing difficulties whilst trying to earn each other's trust.

== Cast ==
- Akin Solanke-Caulker
- Alex Mytton
- Alexandra "Binky" Felstead
- Daisy Robins
- Ella Willis
- Emily Blackwell
- Francesca "Cheska" Hull
- Francis Boulle
- Frankie Gaff
- Fredrik Ferrier
- Georgia “Toff” Toffolo
- Harry Baron
- Jamie Laing
- Josh "JP" Patterson
- Julius Cowdrey
- Louise Thompson
- Mark-Francis Vandelli
- Mimi Bouchard
- Oliver Proudlock
- Olivia Bentley
- Ollie Locke
- Rosie Fortescue
- Ryan Libbey
- Sam Prince
- Sam Thompson
- Stephanie Pratt
- Tiff Watson
- Tina Stinnes
- Victoria Baker-Harber

== Episodes ==
No. overall	No. in season	Title	Original release date	Duration	UK viewers
147	1	"It’s The Next Chapter"	20 March 2017	60 minutes	961,000
As Sam T attends a job interview for Tiff’s dad, he bumps into Ella, a face from his past. Binky has some shocking news for the girls as she reveals that she’s expecting a baby, but the boys have a different reaction when JP delivers the bombshell. Olivia is thrown when she discovers that Fred has invited Daisy, her old rival on their upcoming group holiday, and Tiff’s jealousy is refuelled when she discovers that Sam T and Ella are back in contact. Elsewhere Mark Francis hosts a Russian ball, Ollie and JP finally bury the hatchet, and Olivia rages when she sees Julius getting close to Daisy.
148	2	"You Just Crave Sex and Carbs"	27 March 2017	60 minutes	820,000
Ollie hosts a party for Binky to announce the sex of her baby but the reveal ends up being overshadowed by a confrontation between Ryan and James over Louise. Over in Mauritius, Daisy and Olivia go head-to-head before agreeing to be civil with each other, whilst Sam T angers the girls by siding with Ella instead of Tiff. Julius is torn when both Daisy and Ella compete for his attention. Elsewhere an angry Tiff fears she’s wasting her life with Sam T when he says he’s not quite ready to get married or have kids.
149	3	"Fred, You Have A Girlfriend You Moron"	3 April 2017	60 minutes	837,000
Tiff wants reassurance that Sam T will eventually want the same things as her but Jamie puts doubts in her mind by revealing that he will never change. Ryan feels that Alex is manipulating Louise into going on wild nights out, but is left even more angry to hear that he’s made passing flirting comments towards her. Ella’s friend Mimi arrives in Chelsea with a flirty past with Fred, and makes it her mission to get him despite knowing he has a girlfriend. Elsewhere Daisy is hurt when Julius takes Ella out on a date, and Olivia is quick to confront Mimi when she discovers her intentions with Fred.
150	4	"Homewrecker, One O’Clock"	10 April 2017	60 minutes	805,000
Mimi watches from the sidelines as Fred and Olivia’s relationship deteriorates. Elsewhere Sam T feels betrayed by Jamie for throwing him under the bus leaving Louise no choice but to step in and defend her brother. Olivia’s anger increases when Mimi swoops in for Fred a matter of hours after their break-up, and Jamie’s new intern Sam P tries to make a move on Victoria. Binky meets with Louise and Rosie to go shopping for the unborn baby, whilst Toff causes tension between the girls as she sides with Mimi over Olivia.
151	5	"It Looks Like You Are Obsessed With Me"	17 April 2017	60 minutes	740,000
Harry is reintroduced into the circle as Sam T seeks advice on his to handle his friendship with Jamie after it reaches breaking point. Olivia is left heartbroken when she catches Fred and Mimi on a spa date together. A guilty Julius confesses to Ella that he has slept with somebody behind her back, whilst Olivia warns Julius that Fred is being a bad influence to him. Meanwhile Sam T tells the boys about Jamie’s backstabbing, and Mark Francis launches his new clothing range. Feeling Sam T is trying to turn his friends against him, Jamie goes on the warpath, and Olivia and Mimi go head-to-head once again.
152	6	"He Said They Didn’t Kiss, He Said They Fondled"	24 April 2017	60 minutes	814,000
Harry makes it his mission to win Ella back but goes the complete wrong way about it. Rumours begin to spread as Jamie and Frankie hit a rough patch in their relationship when he admits to cheating on her over Christmas. With Julius and Ella getting close again, Daisy fears her friend could get hurt again. Elsewhere Sam T and Jamie finally clear the air, and Olivia and Harry share a kiss. JP and Ollie bond over a birthing video in order to impress Binky, Toff hosts a diamond themed party, and Julius and Harry clash over their growing feelings for Ella.
153	7	"If I Could Punch You In The Face I Would"	1 May 2017	60 minutes	835,000
Harry invites a select few for a weekend break but Julius is wary of him manipulating Ella into getting back with him. Daisy invites Jamie’s ex-girlfriend Tina on the trip unaware Jamie is also attending, leaving Olivia no choice but to warn Frankie about her boyfriend’s present company. Following a date with Mimi, Fred realises he can’t pursue her any more to protect Olivia’s feelings, and Frankie and Jamie’s turbulent relationship faces another obstacle. Elsewhere Julius angrily confronts Ella when he learns that she’s still flirting with Harry, and Frankie and Tina have an almighty clash.
154	8	"Marriage Is Inevitable"	8 May 2017	60 minutes	772,000
Louise returns home from Paris telling her friends that she was convinced that Ryan was going to propose to her on their trip away. Harry continues to cause a rift between Ella and Julius by turning them both against each other, whilst Jamie uses dirty tactics to move Frankie’s attention to Olivia being friends with Tina rather than their rocky romance. Sam P and Toff agree to go on a date, Ryan tells Louise that they will inevitably get married, and a furious Frankie gives Olivia an ultimatum. Elsewhere JP and Binky discuss their future as parents.
155	9	"Mate, I Got Myself In A Little Bit Of A Situation"	15 May 2017	60 minutes	870,000
As Ryan moves in with Louise, Sam T feels like he’s being pushed out of his home and confides in Rosie over his fears. Frankie catches Olivia and Tina out together again and vows to cut all ties from her once friend. After a kiss with Harry, Ella finally realises she’s been manipulated by him so seeks solace from Julius. Elsewhere rumours spread about Harry and Frankie’s night together, and during a heated confrontation at a dinner party, Tina lets the cat out the bag. Frankie pleads her innocence to Jamie who quickly forgives her whilst others feel her halo has slipped.
156	10	"I’m Not This Good A Liar"	22 May 2017	60 minutes	817,000
Binky and JP return from their babymoon to discuss their living arrangements for when the baby arrives. Frankie is delivered another shock blow when Daisy shows her photos of Jamie kissing another girl in a nightclub, but despite the photographic evidence he denies it. Frankie is insulted when Olivia offers her relationship advice, and Ella is concerned that Julius doesn’t fully trust her again. Elsewhere the boys model for Mark Francis’s new clothing range, and Frankie walks away from Jamie.
157	11	"This Is Not A Baby Shower, This Is A Fricking Carnival"	29 May 2017	60 minutes	757,000
Stephanie, Louise and Ollie agree to organise Binky’s baby shower but are shocked by her demands. As Julius and Ella make things official, there’s a clear obstacle for the couple as Olivia announces her disapproval. Elsewhere Jamie finds out that Harry has once again been meddling in his relationship leaving him to choice but to confront his rival, and Toff ends things with Sam P when advice from the boys backfires. Cheska makes a surprise return at the baby shower with some pregnancy news of her own, and the group prepare for a trip to Ibiza.

== Ratings ==
Episode	Date	Official E4 rating	E4 weekly rank
Episode 1	20 March 2017	961,000	2
Episode 2	27 March 2017	820,000	6
Episode 3	3 April 2017	837,000	5
Episode 4	10 April 2017	805,000	7
Episode 5	17 April 2017	740,000	8
Episode 6	24 April 2017	814,000	3
Episode 7	1 May 2017	835,000	4
Episode 8	8 May 2017	772,000	5
Episode 9	15 May 2017	870,000	3
Episode 10	22 May 2017	817,000	2
Episode 11	29 May 2017	757,000	4
Average		821,000	4
