= Wonder Raps =

- Genre: Children's television
- Country of origin: United Kingdom
- No. of series: 2
- No. of episodes: 20

Production
- Running time: 5 minutes
- Production company: Monkey Kingdom

Original release
- Network: Sky Kids
- Release: 2021 – present

Wonder Raps is a British educational children's television series, broadcast on Sky Kids and streaming platforms. It is presented by MC Grammar, a teacher who uses educational rap to teach children.

Each animated episode is 5 minutes long, with each featuring a different educational rap about a given topic. Topics in the first season included volcanoes and how to save the planet. The premise of the show is to teach children in a fun way about topics that some children would struggle to focus on.

== Background ==
In 2019, Jacob Mitchell from the London Borough of Barnet began to use social media to post educational raps. This began when he posted a video rapping The Gruffalo to his daughter. Mitchell began to use the performing name "MC Grammar," featuring on numerous TV and radio shows, including The Ellen Show.

== Broadcast ==
In October 2021, it was announced that Sky Kids would air the first season of the show.
