= Made in Chelsea series 11 =

Made in Chelsea
- Series 11
- No. of episodes: 11

Release
- Original network: E4
- Original release: 11 April – 20 June 2016

Series chronology
- ← Previous; Series 10 Next → South of France

The eleventh series of Made in Chelsea, a British structured-reality television programme, was confirmed on 1 March 2016 to begin on 11 April 2016 on E4 and concluded on 27 June 2016 following eleven regular episodes and a "The Aftermath" special hosted by Rick Edwards. This is the first series not to feature original cast member Spencer Matthews following his departure during the previous series, as well as long running cast member Oliver Proudlock. Ahead of the series, it was confirmed that Jessica Dixon and Olivia Bentley had joined the series as new cast members, however Jessica only appeared in four episodes. They were joined by Frankie Gaff and Matt Draper midway through the series. This is the final series to feature long-serving cast member Lucy Watson, as well as, James Dunmore, Nicola Hughes, Millie Wilkinson and Tallulah Rufus-Isaacs. The series focused heavily on the fallout between Lucy and Stephanie and the consequences it had for the remaining cast, as well blossoming romance between Jamie and Frankie despite cheating allegations. It also featured Sam and Tiff's turbulent relationship hit a number of obstacles, and the breakdown of Binky and JP's relationship.

== Cast ==
- Alex Mytton
- Alexandra "Binky" Felstead
- Alik Alfus
- Frankie Gaff
- Georgia “Toff” Toffolo
- James Dunmore
- Jamie Laing
- Jess Woodley
- Josh "JP" Patterson
- Louise Thompson
- Lucy Watson
- Mark-Francis Vandelli
- Matt Draper
- Millie Wilkinson
- Nicola Hughes
- Olivia Bentley
- Ollie Locke
- Richard Dinan
- Rosie Fortescue
- Sam Thompson
- Stephanie Pratt
- Tallulah Rufus-Isaacs
- Tiff Watson
- Victoria Baker-Harber

== Episodes ==
No. overall	No. in season	Title	Original release date	Duration	UK viewers
119	1	"I Used To Snog Girls In The Towel Cupboard... Naked"	11 April 2016	60 minutes	907,000
Sam’s ex-girlfriend Olivia makes herself comfy within the group which riles Tiff after discovering she’s going round telling everybody about Sam. Binky and JP’s relationship is the talk of Chelsea as he continues to neglect her, and Stephanie reveals she may have feelings for Alex before finding out he’s still with Nicola. As JP expresses anger that Lucy has stolen James from him, Louise feels the tension is because James has set the relationship bar high. Tiff comes face-to-face with Olivia, and Lucy confronts JP over his opinions on her relationship.
120	2	"Everyone Dates Everyone... That's Just What We Do"	18 April 2016	60 minutes	962,000
Tiff rages with Sam when he tries to defend Olivia and is left even more red faced when she discovers that she’s been round his house. Stephanie is hurt when Lucy turns on her during a conversation about Alex, and soon realises that her passing comment about him has got the girls talking. Ollie gives JP much needed advice as he struggles in his relationship with Binky, before finally making a bold statement to her. Elsewhere Stephanie is isolated by the group as Lucy accuses her of spreading vicious rumours about her.
121	3	"My Mum Likes Getting Her Boobs Out When She's Drunk, It's Fine"	25 April 2016	60 minutes	801,000
Photos of Sam on a night out circulate but despite Tiff claiming she’s fine, Lucy tells her she should be angry with her boyfriend. Elsewhere Jamie notices a spark between him and Jessica Molly and organises a group dinner date in order to get closer to her, whilst Alex tells Nicola the truth about Stephanie’s comments. Olivia clashes with Jessica Molly as their past hatred is dug up, Stephanie apologises to Nicola and the girls but is shocked at Rosie and Louise’s reactions, and Lucy is bluntly honest with Stephanie by telling her that their friendship is over.
122	4	"It's So Hard Talking To Someone Whose Face Doesn't Move"	2 May 2016	60 minutes	900,000
Louise decides to fly out to New York to visit Alik when she realises their relationship is hitting a rough patch, whilst Binky and Tallulah’s attempts to call a truce between Rosie and Victoria ends in disaster. Jamie introduces his new love interest Frankie to the group where she has an awkward meeting with Jessica Molly. After Lucy doesn’t invite Stephanie to her birthday party, Stephanie plans a trip to the Maldives and fails to invite Lucy. Elsewhere Sam’s bid to clear the air with Lucy leads to an uncomfortable revelation regarding James.
123	5	"Why Am I Keeping All Your Secrets?"	9 May 2016	60 minutes	989,000
Some of the group head out to the Maldives with Stephanie but there’s a clear atmosphere as she continues to grate on the girls causing her to have separate altercations with Nicola, Louise and Tiff. Meanwhile in Chelsea, Jamie makes things exclusive with Frankie, but Lucy fears things aren’t as they seem with his friendship with Jess. Binky and Louise confides in each other about their relationships, and Stephanie issues a threat to Tiff that she can no longer keep her secret leaving her no choice but to make a confession to her boyfriend before Stephanie gets there first.
124	6	"You Need To Find Someone Who Is Weird, Who You Can Be Weird With"	16 May 2016	60 minutes	978,000
Sam is still reeling from Tiff’s big confession but faces further humiliation when he learns that Lucy has known the whole time. Mark Francis and Victoria make peace following a small squabble over Rosie, whilst despite getting closer to Toff, Richard fears they have completely different interests. Elsewhere Frankie has reason to be suspicious of Jamie when she discovers he may have hooked up with somebody else, and Louise rages at Lucy for her past treatment of Sam whilst knowing her sister was the cheat the whole time.
125	7	"I Was Considering Nipple Tassles"	23 May 2016	60 minutes	824,000
Richard suggests going for dinner with Toff but after a successful night, things turn sour when she receives a text from him the next morning saying they’re not compatible. Tiff is put in an awkward situation when Sam demands an apology from Lucy, whilst Nicola breaks some tough news to Frankie regarding some infidelity from Jamie. Meanwhile Louise is torn when Alik invites her on holiday, Frankie confronts Jamie over the cheating allegations, and Toff confronts Richard over his harsh feelings. Elsewhere, Jamie worms his way back into Frankie’s affections.
126	8	"Go Get The Girl"	30 May 2016	60 minutes	949,000
Louise returns home from her make or break holiday with news that she and Alik are over, whilst Stephanie accidentally adds fuel to the fire by putting Lucy’s friend Fraser in an awkward position. Meanwhile Richard receives the third degree from an angry Toff, and Jamie has a confession for Frankie as he’s finally honest with her about the cheating allegation. Jess sets her sights on new boy Matt, unaware that there’s already bad blood between him and some of the group, and Alik arrives with a grand gesture for Louise – only to be let down.
127	9	"Once A Cheat, Always A Cheat"	6 June 2016	60 minutes	970,000
With the news that Binky and JP have broken up spreading around Chelsea, there is clearly two sides to every story. Jamie desperately attempts to amend things with Frankie only to hear that Jess has been dripping poison in her ear about him. Elsewhere Ollie meets with JP to defend his friend over the cheating but it soon transpires that JP finished with Binky because of her nights out – before it was revealed she kissed somebody else. Mark-Francis is delighted at Toff’s successful job interview, Jamie confronts Jess over her bad-mouthing him to Frankie, and Rosie and JP clash.
128	10	"One Normally Has A Different Tea Service For Every Room"	13 June 2016	60 minutes	812,000
As Toff finds it difficult to fit in at her new job, she seeks help from Mark-Francis who organises a tea party for her. With Stephanie’s 30th birthday round the corner, she sends out invitations to the group for her prom themed party, however both Lucy and Tiff refuse to attend. Elsewhere Binky’s Mum meets with JP begging him to forgive her daughter, and Jamie is caught in the middle of Jess and Frankie after rumours continue to fly around. Meanwhile, Tiff is shaken when she discovers Sam went to Stephanie’s party and won prom king and queen with her, and Matt tries his luck with Louise.
129	11	"Marry The Idiot"	20 June 2016	60 minutes	707,000
After saying yes to a date with Matt, Louise then has second thoughts when she hears that Alik has his father’s blessing to move to England. Tiff continues to rage with Sam after finding out he’s had another wild night out, but Toff feels she’s punishing him for having fun with other people. Lucy and Stephanie face another heated argument as they accept they will never be friends again, Jess is hurt to learn that Matt has wandering eyes, Jamie and Frankie finally give their relationship another go, whilst Binky feels destroyed when JP tells her she needs to move on.
–	–	"The Aftermath"	27 June 2016	60 minutes	602,000
Presented by Rick Edwards, the cast reunite to discuss events from the series.

== Ratings ==
Episode	Date	Official E4 rating	E4 weekly rank
Episode 1	11 April 2016	907,000	6
Episode 2	18 April 2016	962,000	4
Episode 3	25 April 2016	801,000	9
Episode 4	2 May 2016	900,000	2
Episode 5	9 May 2016	989,000	2
Episode 6	16 May 2016	978,000	2
Episode 7	23 May 2016	824,000	8
Episode 8	30 May 2016	949,000	3
Episode 9	6 June 2016	970,000	2
Episode 10	13 June 2016	812,000	6
Episode 11	20 June 2016	707,000	5
The Aftermath	27 June 2016	602,000	6
Average		891,000	4
