= Made in Chelsea series 10 =

Made in Chelsea
- Series 10
- No. of episodes: 11

Release
- Original network: E4
- Original release: 19 October – 28 December 2015

Series chronology
- ← Previous; LA Next → Series 11

The tenth series of Made in Chelsea, a British structured-reality television programme, began airing on 19 October 2015 on E4. The official trailer for the new series was released on 29 September 2015 confirming the start date. It concluded on 4 January 2016 following nine regular episodes, a Christmas special, a New Year special, and an End of Season party hosted by Rick Edwards. This series was the first to include new cast members Emma Walsh, Lily Ludovici Gray, Sam Harney and Tallulah Rufus Isaacs. Richard Dinan also returned to the series having last appeared during the fifth series, and Francis Boulle made a one-off return during the Christmas special. This was also the final series to include original cast member Spencer Matthews, long-running cast member Oliver Proudlock, as well as Millie Wilkinson and Emily Weller, who both made their debuts during the ninth series. The series focused heavily on Sam and Tiff's rocky relationship coming to an end when Tiff admits to cheating on him during the summer and rumours of Sam cheating surface, until the pair eventually reunite.

== Cast ==
- Alex Mytton
- Alexandra "Binky" Felstead
- Alik Alfus
- Elliot Cross
- Emily Weller
- Emma Walsh
- Francis Boulle
- Georgia “Toff” Toffolo
- James Dunmore
- Jamie Laing
- Jess Woodley
- Josh "JP" Patterson
- Lily Ludovici Gray
- Louise Thompson
- Lucy Watson
- Mark-Francis Vandelli
- Millie Wilkinson
- Nicola Hughes
- Oliver Proudlock
- Ollie Locke
- Richard Dinan
- Rosie Fortescue
- Sam Harney
- Sam Thompson
- Stephanie Pratt
- Spencer Matthews
- Tallulah Rufus-Isaacs
- Tiff Watson
- Victoria Baker-Harber

== Episodes ==
No. overall	No. in season	Title	Original release date	Duration	UK viewers
108	1	"No One Ever Kicks Me Out of Bed"	19 October 2015	60 minutes	844,000
Back in Chelsea, the girls are still against JP following his ill treatment of Binky, and Louise makes it clear that they aren’t right together. After a further revelation that Jess and Jamie have slept together since LA, Jess is worried that she may be leading him on. Harney is introduced to the group but immediately ruffles Jamie’s feathers when he spots a connection between him and Jess. Sam has some explaining to do when a photo is released of him getting close to another girl, but it’s Tiff who’s the guilty one when she confesses to cheating on him whilst in Hong Kong.
109	2	"You Look Like A Unicorn"	26 October 2015	60 minutes	910,000
With Jamie in Ibiza getting some space from Jess, she’s disappointed that he wasn’t in the country for her 21st birthday party until he calls to ask her to join him abroad with a few friends. Harney and Stephanie immediately hit it off when they meet and agree to go on a date, whilst Ollie meets with JP to get to the bottom of his feelings towards Binky, and encourages him to take a risk before it’s too late. Elsewhere, Sam has some questions for Tiff about her fling with another man, Lucy is sceptical as she believes Sam has also cheated, and Jess lets Jamie down gently again.
110	3	"You're Digging Yourself A Grave"	2 November 2015	60 minutes	967,000
Ollie introduces his latest romance Emma but isn’t quite sure where they stand with each other so orders Binky to quiz her in order to get some answers. Richard returns to Chelsea with clear unfinished business with Toff. There’s tension when James comes face-to-face with a blast from the past, but Harney seems keen to ask her out on a date, whilst Millie has some shocking news for Tiff when she reveals she knows for a fact that Sam cheated on her. Ollie is hurt when he catches Spencer flirting with Emma, and Sam faces the wrath of the Watson sisters.
111	4	"He Lives And Breathes Vagina"	9 November 2015	60 minutes	986,000
Ollie finds himself pouring his heart out to Emma but is left devastated when she’s honest to him about kissing Spencer the night before. Lucy and Rosie’s feud is reignited when Tiff becomes Rosie’s intern and Lucy is infuriated feeling her sister should have more family loyalty. Binky is caught in the middle of Spencer and Ollie as Emma breaks up an old friendship, and Jess’s friendly gesture towards Jamie goes disastrously wrong as the pair end up bickering. Elsewhere, Richard admits to fancying Stephanie, and Lucy meets Brigita; a girl who once tried it on with James.
112	5	"I've Heard He's Quite A Thorough Lover"	16 November 2015	60 minutes	677,000
Richard takes Stephanie on a date to show her his robots, but after the date turns out to be successful, she panics as she’s reminded of her previous failed relationships. Toff opens up to Ollie over her growing feelings for Richard but feels they aren’t reciprocated. Proving her loyalty to Ollie, Binky warns Emma to stay away from Spencer leaving him raging as he thought she would never badmouth him. Elsewhere, Rosie confronts Lucy after discovering she’s refusing to let Tiff work for her, and JP and Binky get flirty again.
113	6	"You Don't Get Anywhere In Life Without Visualising The End Goal"	23 November 2015	60 minutes	856,000
Delighted over a recent kiss with JP, Binky finally decides to tell the girls that she has been secretly meeting with him and have been getting close again. Nicola is sick to the stomach to hear Alex has been messaging Jess for relationship advice then deleting the evidence. Spencer ‘s eyes wander towards Tallulah and the pair end up hooking up, but it’s Victoria who puts her foot in it by revealing the truth to Emma. Elsewhere, Lucy and Tiff find themselves drifting further apart, and after a friendly warning from Louise, JP decides to officially ask Binky to be his girlfriend and she accepts.
114	7	"We Were Like Two Peas In A Pod, And Now I'm Just One Pea"	30 November 2015	60 minutes	671 000
Emma and Spencer’s brief fling comes to an end as he sets his sights elsewhere, but Emma is still disappointed at Ollie holding grudges. Elliot has a confession to make when he explains that he and Louise shared a drunken kiss recently, but she rages when she has no recollection of it. Lucy catches Jess and Spencer on a friendly date together, and Toff puts her heart on the line when she asks Richard out on a date. Elsewhere, Jamie is enraged to hear about Spencer’s latest project, Toff hides her true feelings when Richard turns her down, and Louise tells Alik the truth.
115	8	"I Feel Like I've Been Put In A Naughty Corner"	7 December 2015	60 minutes	963,000
Alik lands in London ready to confront Elliot and Louise over their fling, whilst Toff plans a joint birthday party with Richard. Louise promises she will make it up to Alik and agrees to go back to New York with him. When it’s revealed that Ollie and Tiff have been texting, Lucy is quick to judge causing more problems between the warring sisters forcing Tiff to move out. Mark Francis and Victoria race to stop Toff making another mistake with Richard, and Lucy finds herself even angrier with Tiff after finding out her new best friend is James’s ex-girlfriend.
116	9	"I'm All Over The Place Right Now, Emotionally And Florally"	14 December 2015	60 minutes	733,000
Ollie takes Tiff out on their first official date, whilst Sam confides in his friends over how much he is missing her. Lucy rubs salt in the wounds by explaining to Sam that Tiff has moved onto somebody else, and there’s an awkward situation when Ollie and Sam both bump into each other whilst buying Tiff a gift. Nicola and Alex’s relationship hits the rocks again and he’s angry that he turns to Binky for advice, whilst JP struggle to commit to Binky is the talk of Chelsea and Lucy fears he may not be right for her. Sam opens up to Tiff over his feelings towards her but she admits to needing time to think about things.
117	10	"There's A Jamie Shaped Hole In My Life"	21 December 2015	60 minutes	818,000
Mark Francis and Victoria make comments about Ollie’s dire situation with Tiff which quickly spreads around Chelsea leaving Ollie upset. Sam awkwardly comes face-to-face with Mr Watson whilst out for a drink with James’s ex-girlfriend, and Lucy rages that she’s telling lies about when she was with James. At Louise’s dinner party, Lucy accuses her sister of stirring things between James and Lily, whilst Ollie finds himself causing a scene when confronting Mark Francis over the comments. Elsewhere, Francis makes a brief return to London, and Sam makes a huge gesture to Tiff, who agrees to be his girlfriend again.
118	11	"He’s Making An Armageddon Of Mistakes"	28 December 2015	60 minutes	838,000
With everybody else happy that and Sam and Tiff are back together, Jamie throws a spanner in the works by bringing up Sam’s past cheating mistakes forcing him to admit everything to Tiff. Rosie is under attack from Mark Francis after standing up for Ollie, and Toff makes an apology for going from group to group with information. Alik seeks advice from his father before giving Louise an ultimatum, and Nicola and Alex run into more problems. Jess is confused by her sudden friendship with Nicola but is shocked when she finds out it’s actually a bid to keep her enemies closer.
–	–	"End of Season Party"	4 January 2016	60 minutes	615,000
Presented by Rick Edwards, the cast reunite to discuss events from the series.

== Ratings ==
Episode	Date	Official E4 rating	E4 weekly rank
Episode 1	19 October 2015	844,000	7
Episode 2	26 October 2015	910,000	2
Episode 3	2 November 2015	967,000	2
Episode 4	9 November 2015	986,000	2
Episode 5	16 November 2015	677,000	7
Episode 6	23 November 2015	856,000	4
Episode 7	30 November 2015	671,000	7
Episode 8	7 December 2015	963,000	2
Episode 9	14 December 2015	733,000	7
Christmas special	21 December 2015	818,000	4
New Year special	28 December 2015	838,000	1
End of Season Party	4 January 2016	615,000	10
Average		842,000	4
