= The Question Jury =

British game show

- Genre: Game show
- Country of origin: United Kingdom
- Original language: English
- No. of series: 2
- No. of episodes: 40

Production
- Running time: 60 minutes (inc. adverts)
- Production company: Monkey

Original release
- Network: Channel 4
- Release: 11 July 2016 – 11 August 2017

The Question Jury is a British game show that aired on Channel 4 from 11 July 2016 to 11 August 2017. The format is based on a team of contestants attempting to answer questions unanimously, like a jury.

== Format ==
The show consists of seven jurors. The first two rounds entail the jury trying to answer questions unanimously, for £500. The third sees all but one of the jury trying to answer 10 questions in ninety seconds, each worth £50. The fourth and fifth rounds are the same as the first and second, except that they are played for £1,000. The sixth sees all but three of the jury answering quickfire questions for £50 each, while the seventh and eighth sees them trying to agree answers on two more questions worth £1,500. The ninth sees all but three answering quickfire questions for £100, however, an incorrect answer ends the round. The tenth round's question is worth £2,000. Each of the seven players is Foreman for one of the seven non-quickfire rounds; the Foreman for each non-quickfire round is determined before the show, while the Foreman for each of the quickfire rounds is picked by the jury.

In round eleven, one person plays for all that has been raised throughout the episode. All who wish to play for it stand up, and the persons remaining seated are given the responsibility to decide which person will play. If all jurors stand, they all vote for their preferred fellow juror. If the vote is tied, the jurors not in the tie pick their preferred juror among those in the tie. The player that is picked faces one final question, which they may discuss with their fellow jurors. If the player gets it right, they leave with the money that has been banked in that episode. If the chosen player gives an incorrect answer, they leave with nothing.

The player chosen to answer the question is replaced by a new juror in the next episode. At the end of the week, the entire jury is released and the process starts again with seven fresh jurors.

== Episodes ==
Series	Start date	End date	Episodes
1	11 July 2016	5 August 2016	20
2	17 July 2017	11 August 2017	20
