= Made in Chelsea: LA =

- No. of episodes: 6

Release
- Original network: E4
- Original release: 10 August – 14 September 2015

Series chronology
- ← Previous; Series 9 Next → Series 10

Made in Chelsea: LA, a spin-off series of Made in Chelsea, a British structured-reality television programme, was confirmed on 14 May 2015. It was announced that the cast of Made in Chelsea would be travelling to Los Angeles to film a special series of the show. It was revealed that this would be a stand-alone series which would not be promoted as the tenth series. The tenth series followed in October 2015. Filming for the spin-off began in late May 2015 and concluded in late-July. This is the second spin-off show filmed in America following the NYC special the previous year. The third episode of this series was filmed in Las Vegas. The six-episode series began on 10 August 2015 on E4. It also featured the brief return of former cast member Gabriella Ellis, as well as the permanent return of Ollie Locke. It was the only series to include American cast members Olivia Fox and Naz Gharai, and the last to include Josh Shepherd. Whilst most of the Chelsea cast featured in this spin-off, there was notable absences from Elliot Cross, Oliver Proudlock, Millie Wilkinson, Nicola Hughes, Rosie Fortescue, Sam Thompson, Spencer Matthews, Tiff Watson, and Victoria Baker-Harber. The series included the end of the relationship between Josh and Stephanie, Jamie starting a holiday romance with Naz before eventually realising he actually has feelings for Jess, and Binky opening up to JP about her growing love for him only for him to break things off completely.

== Cast ==
- Alex Mytton
- Alexandra "Binky" Felstead
- Alik Alfus
- Gabriella Ellis
- Georgia "Toff" Toffolo
- James Dunmore
- Jamie Laing
- Jess Woodley
- Josh "JP" Patterson
- Josh Shepherd
- Louise Thompson
- Lucy Watson
- Mark-Francis Vandelli
- Naz Gharai
- Olivia Fox
- Ollie Locke
- Stephanie Pratt

== Episodes ==
No. overall	No. in season	Title	Original release date	Duration	UK viewers
102	1	"I'm So L.A. I Don't Get Sarcasm"	10 August 2015	60 minutes	780,000
The group arrive in LA and after the revelation that Jamie and Jess haven’t spoken since the festival, he admits he will be hurt if she speaks to another boy, but he suddenly takes a shine to American girl Naz. Whilst everybody enjoys a pool party, Mark Francis meets Olivia as he visits historical locations. Elsewhere Lucy and Stephanie fear that Josh might be acting single in front of the boys, Binky and JP continue to drift apart until he surprises her with gifts for her birthday, and Jamie and Naz agree to go on a date. Jess gets her own back on Jamie as she meets a guy whilst out jogging.
103	2	"Are Feet Like A Big Attraction Over Here?"	17 August 2015	60 minutes	924,000
After Binky found herself in a situation where she kicked off with JP for flirting with a girl, she is forced to deal with the consequences as a relationship looks less likely. Gabriella joins her old friends, whilst Jamie takes Naz on the date of her dreams. Stephanie is distraught when Josh breaks up with her just two weeks after discussing marriage, Binky realises the extent of her feelings towards JP but is gutted when she sees him with Olivia. Elsewhere, Jamie has an apology for Jess, and Stephanie demands to know the truth about her break up.
104	3	"I Promise To Be Your Priscilla Tonight"	24 August 2015	60 minutes	869,000
The gang head off to Vegas, but Louise is excited to remain in LA where she’s joined by Alik. The boys get confused as Jamie tells them he’s still flirting and hooking up with other girls, but tells Naz they’re exclusive. Naz tells JP she already has a strong connection with Jamie but is instantly stunned by his reaction leaving her no choice but to quiz Jamie over what he’s been telling other people. Elsewhere, James arrives to surprise Lucy, and Jamie confesses to getting with another girl before him and Naz agreed to be exclusive, and both agree to give things another go.
105	4	"Our Group Of Friends All Sleep In Each Other's Beds"	31 August 2015	60 minutes	831,000
After the revelation that Jess and Jamie have slept in the same bed, Jamie is forced to tell Naz about it before she hears off somebody else. With Noah joining the group for a game of golf, he feels awkward around Jamie after hearing the truth about their recent romance. Mark Francis is disappointed by Toff for playing American football with the others, Jess feels she’s been thrown under the bus by Binky and Louise as they tell Naz about her past with men, and Jamie ends up in a predicament after realising he still has feelings for Jess.
106	5	"You Only Like Each Other When You're Not Supposed To"	7 September 2015	60 minutes	939,000
Binky prepares to put her heart on the line and ask out JP but seeks last minute advice from her friends, whilst Jess is torn after confessing that she doesn’t want Jamie but doesn’t want anybody else to have him. After arriving to a party together, Jamie and Jess are under attack from their friends when they take Naz’s side. Binky is let down by JP when he refuses to accept her past leaving her no choice but to pack her bags and return home to London. James urges JP to take the risk and to make things work with Binky but it’s Lucy and Louise who break the news to him that he’s too late.
107	6	"The Secret's Out Now"	14 September 2015	60 minutes	905,000
Binky’s back in Chelsea and meets up with Ollie to discuss the goings-on in LA but breaks down and reveals she and JP slept together days before she confessed her feelings for him. With the news spreading to the group in America, Louise has a fiery confrontation with JP when more truths come to light that he’s been messaging other girls. Jamie makes amends with Naz before pouring his heart out to Jess, who wastes no time shooting him down. Alex has explaining to do when JP questions him over the recent rumours he’s started, and Olivia and Mark Francis say a final goodbye.

== Broadcast ==
Internationally, the series premiered in Australia on 8 November 2015 on LifeStyle You.

== Ratings ==
Episode	Date	Official E4 rating	E4 weekly rank
Episode 1	10 August 2015	780,000	5
Episode 2	17 August 2015	924,000	1
Episode 3	24 August 2015	869,000	1
Episode 4	31 August 2015	831,000	1
Episode 5	7 September 2015	939,000	1
Episode 6	14 September 2015	905,000	1
Average		875,000	2
