= Made in Chelsea series 8 =

Made in Chelsea
- Series 8
- No. of episodes: 11

Release
- Original network: E4
- Original release: 13 October – 22 December 2014

Series chronology
- ← Previous; NYC Next → Series 9

The eighth series of Made in Chelsea, a British structured-reality television programme, began airing on 13 October 2014 on E4.

== Season overview ==
This is the first series to feature new main cast members Josh Shepherd, Lauren Frazer-Hutton, Tiff Watson and Lonan O'Herlihy, and was the only series to include cast members George Amor and Will Colebrook after they did not return for the ninth series. New character Lauren as Spencer Matthews's girlfiend. Meanwhile, Tiffany is sister of Lucy Watson, another pre-existing character. The series focuses on Spencer and Lauren's relationship, an ongoing argument between Binky and Fran, romance between Alik and Louise, and Sam attempting to win back Tiffany after several cheating allegations.

== Cast ==
- Alex Mytton
- Alexandra "Binky" Felstead
- Alik Alfus
- Andy Jordan
- Fran Newman-Young
- George Amor
- Georgia "Toff" Toffolo
- Jamie Laing
- Josh Shepherd
- Lauren Frazer-Hutton
- Lonan O’Herlihy
- Louise Thompson
- Lucy Watson
- Mark-Francis Vandelli
- Oliver Proudlock
- Rosie Fortescue
- Sam Thompson
- Stephanie Pratt
- Sophie Hermann
- Spencer Matthews
- Stevie Johnson
- Tiff Watson
- Victoria Baker-Harber
- Will Colebrook

== Episodes ==
No. overall	No. in season	Title	Original release date	Duration	UK viewers
80	1	"What Happens In New York, Doesn't Stay In New York"	13 October 2014	60 minutes	997,000
Binky and Louise meet Will and Lonan in Devon and Binky is immediately attracted to them, but later discovers they already know Alex. As Alik moves to London to be with Louise, Andy admits he’s feeling heartbroken about the situation. Spencer warns Alik about Andy’s behaviour, Alex has an awkward confrontation with Binky, and Lucy confesses to Binky that she has feelings for Proudlock. At Spencer’s birthday party Lucy and Proudlock agree to go on a date but keep it secret to avoid hurting Jamie, and Alik feels threatened when he comes face-to-face with Andy.
81	2	"You Snooze, You Lose"	20 October 2014	60 minutes	TBA
Alik feels unnerved by Andy’s growing obsession with Louise and plans to speak to him about it, whilst news of Lucy and Proudlock’s date spreads. Binky and Will continue to flirt as he agrees to become her personal trainer, but both understand that it’s just a subtle excuse to see each other. Lucy opens up to Proudlock about her feelings towards him but is reluctant to go on a second date due to trust issues. Victoria meets a new love interest George, and Louise sets things straight with Andy. Jamie drops a bombshell on Sam that he’s heard rumours about Alik cheating on Louise.
82	3	"Prudders Is A Beast"	27 October 2014	60 minutes	929,000
Sam breaks the news to Louise about Alik’s alleged cheating, and as she confronts her boyfriend he makes it clear that the conversation Jamie overheard was a joke with Proudlock. Louise has no choice but to question Jamie about the rumour, who stands by what he originally heard. With news about Proudlock still hooking up with girls, Lucy has doubts in her mind over what she wants. Mark Francis arranges a date for Victoria and George, whilst a rift is caused between Jamie and Proudlock over recent situations. Will is worried that Binky won’t feel the same way about him.
83	4	"I'm Not Seasonal, I'm A Timeless Classic"	3 November 2014	60 minutes	1,030,000
Proudlock feels isolated by the group as they continue to discuss his betrayal over both Lucy and Jamie, and Louise goes on a mission to find out whether the cheating rumours about Alik are true or not. Binky and Will go on their first date, but as they begin to get closer Binky tells him she doesn’t want to get into anything serious yet. Victoria and Sophie get into a confrontation after finding out things they’ve said about each other, whilst Louise phones the girl who Alik has allegedly cheated with and finds out the rumours are false. Lucy tells Proudlock they’re better as friends.
84	5	"Get Out Of The Friend Zone And Kiss Her"	10 November 2014	60 minutes	1,010,000
Lonan accuses Alex of ruining things between Will and Binky, Stevie introduces his friend Josh into the group, and Sam and Tiff go on their first date. Stephanie returns to London leaving Stevie confused about their future, but they agree to just be friends. Lucy hears a rumour that Louise has cheated on Alik and has no choice but to question her, and Louise confesses to Alik revealing there is a possibility the rumour might be true. Stephanie agrees to go on a date with Josh unaware he’s one of Stevie’s closest friends, and Alex writes a letter of apology to a forgiving Binky.
85	6	"We Could Die Tonight So Let's All Try To Be Happy"	17 November 2014	60 minutes	839,000
Louise is confused by the rumours, whilst Alik plans to find out exactly what his girlfriend has been up to. After Alik goes to Binky to get her side of the story, Louise feels betrayed when the stories don’t match making her look more guilty. As Sam tells people about his kiss with Tiff, she isn’t impressed that he’s spreading her business around. Stephanie has a run-in with Stevie when he reveals he feels hurt by her and Josh, and there’s tension as Tiff accuses Toff of having feelings for Sam. Alik accuses Binky of lying to protect her friend, whilst Andy accuses Louise of cheating.
86	7	"Welcome To My Playpen"	24 November 2014	60 minutes	960,000
Stevie still feels betrayed by Josh and arranges to meet Stephanie to discuss their situation but the pair end up having a heart to heart. Toff is disappointed that Sam didn’t stick up for her during the dinner party, and he tells her that he allowed a girl to sleep in his bed but nothing happened, then Toff encourages him to be honest with Tiff. Andy tells Louise that he still has feelings for her but tells Alik the opposite leaving her questioning his motives and accusing him of sabotaging her relationship. Stevie tells Josh they can’t be friends anymore, and Sam tells Tiff the truth.
87	8	"Someone Needs To Watch The Sheep When The Shepherd's Away"	1 December 2014	60 minutes	921,000
Jamie plans a trip to France for the group but there’s already clear tension between Andy and Louise as they arrive. Lucy and Tiff meet up with Sam’s mystery woman where it’s revealed to be Fran, who tells them that Sam tried it on with her and Binky knew the whole time. Lucy is unimpressed by Binky’s involvement, and Binky is livid that Fran has let her down after originally swearing her to secrecy. Tiff admits that she still wants Sam, and Stephanie encourages her to tell him, whilst Louise feels Alik is spending more time with Andy rather than her. Elsewhere, Binky and Fran clash.
88	9	"It's Like Looking At Bambi Before She Gets Shot"	8 December 2014	60 minutes	870,000
In a bid to win Tiff back, Sam clears the air with her family and agrees to meet Lucy to explain himself. Spencer returns to Chelsea and introduces his new girlfriend Lauren, but Stephanie is quick to tell her about his past and gives her a firm warning about his behaviour. Fran confides in Alex about her argument with Binky, and Josh admits that he’s falling in love with Stephanie. Binky is furious to find out about Fran’s new betrayal and lashes out at her announcing she doesn’t want to live with her anymore, and Spencer hears that Stephanie has been dripping poison in Lauren’s ear.
89	10	"You Need To Grow Up And Be A Man, Period!"	15 December 2014	60 minutes	1,115,000
Spencer plans a big night out for the boys whilst Louise arranges a spa day for the girls. Lonan goes behind Will’s back to train Binky, but there are huge repercussions when he finds out they’ve been meeting behind his back. Stephanie continues to make Lauren feel uncomfortable as she tells her that Spencer will inevitably cheat on her. News of Sam kissing yet another girl reaches Tiff causing another drift between the pair, but will she ever forgive him? Binky accidentally tells Stevie that Stephanie and Josh are moving in together, and Spencer tells Stephanie to keep her distance.
90	11	"Do You Know What Carrying Around My Past Does To People?"	22 December 2014	60 minutes	951,000
Will takes Fran on a date, and Binky is hurt by the situation feeling Will has no right to be angry with Lonan when he’s prepared to date Fran. Spencer has some explaining to do with Lauren when Lucy reveals that he’s still been chasing her following a night out. Realising both sides are the stories are different, Lauren is forced to make a huge decision about her relationship. Spencer categorically denying the rumours, and Lucy leaves Chelsea. Stephanie fears Lucy may be developing old feelings for Spencer again, and Andy decides to clear the air with both Rosie and Louise.
–	–	""End of Season Party""	29 December 2014	60 minutes	786,000
Presented by Rick Edwards, the cast reunite to discuss events from the series.

== Ratings ==
Episode	Date	Official E4 rating	E4 weekly rank
Episode 1	13 October 2014	997,000	5
Episode 2	20 October 2014		
Episode 3	27 October 2014	929,000	7
Episode 4	3 November 2014	1,030,000	6
Episode 5	10 November 2014	1,010,000	7
Episode 6	17 November 2014	839,000	7
Episode 7	24 November 2014	960,000	6
Episode 8	1 December 2014	921,000	6
Episode 9	8 December 2014	870,000	7
Episode 10	15 December 2014	1,115,000	1
Christmas Special	22 December 2014	951,000	1
End of Season Party	29 December 2014	786,000	3
Average		962,000	5
