= Elton John: Me, Myself & I =

- Directed by: James Strong
- Starring: Elton John
- Narrated by: Siân Reeves
- Theme music composer: Elton John
- Country of origin: United Kingdom
- Original language: English

Production
- Producer: Andy Scott
- Cinematography: Steve Buckland
- Editors: Simon George; Mike Jones; Chris Muckle
- Running time: 90 minutes
- Production companies: Monkey Kingdom; Globe Productions

Original release
- Network: ITV
- Release: 22 September 2007

Elton John: Me, Myself & I is a 2007 documentary filmed after the death of Elton John's good friend Diana, Princess of Wales, and other soul shaking events that caused him to reassess his life. It is a candid, tongue-in-cheek appraisal by John of his fame, drug use, sexuality, and mistakenly taking his life for granted. It was filmed in Las Vegas, Nevada, United States.

== See also ==
- Elton John: Tantrums & Tiaras
