= Made in Chelsea series 9 =

Made in Chelsea
- Season 9
- No. of episodes: 11

Release
- Original network: E4
- Original release: 13 April – 22 June 2015

Series chronology
- ← Previous; Series 8 Next → LA

The ninth series of Made in Chelsea, a British structured-reality television programme, began airing on 13 April 2015 on E4. This series also featured the show's 100th episode; broadcast on 15 June 2015. This series was the first series to include new cast members Emily Weller, Jess Woodley, Millie Wilkinson, Fleur Irving, Josh "JP" Patterson, Nicola Hughes, James Dunmore and Elliot Cross, and the last to include long running cast members Andy Jordan and Stevie Johnson, as well as Sophie Hermann, Fran Newman-Young and Lauren Frazer-Hutton. The series focused on blossoming relationships between James and Lucy, and Jamie and Jess, a rift forming between Lucy and Stephanie and Spencer's romance with Lauren hitting the rocks when he turns back to his old ways.

== Cast ==
- Alex Mytton
- Alexandra "Binky" Felstead
- Alik Alfus
- Andy Jordan
- Elliot Cross
- Emily Weller
- Fleur Irving
- Fran Newman-Young
- Georgia "Toff" Toffolo
- James Dunmore
- Jamie Laing
- Jess Woodley
- Josh "JP" Patterson
- Josh Shepherd
- Lauren Frazer-Hutton
- Lonan O’Herlihy
- Louise Thompson
- Lucy Watson
- Mark-Francis Vandelli
- Millie Wilkinson
- Nicola Hughes
- Oliver Proudlock
- Rosie Fortescue
- Sam Thompson
- Sophie Hermann
- Spencer Matthews
- Stephanie Pratt
- Stevie Johnson
- Tiff Watson
- Victoria Baker-Harber

== Episodes ==
No. overall	No. in season	Title	Original release date	Duration	UK viewers
91	1	"Let's Go And Get More Tanned"	13 April 2015	60 minutes	889,000
On holiday in Barbados, Alex introduces his new girlfriend Nicola, which causes a stir in Chelsea as Binky doesn’t think he will ever change. Stephanie and Josh announce that they’re living together but there’s trouble in paradise when they don’t agree on the furniture. Andy and Jamie both compete for Jess’ attention but she reveals that she has unfinished business with Alex. Meanwhile, Sam flirts with Binky’s friend Fleur, and Spencer and Lauren discuss their living arrangements. Jamie is left hurt when Spencer reveals that Andy has arranged a date with Jess.
92	2	"They Were Literally Just Force Feeding Us Relationship Foie Gras"	20 April 2015	60 minutes	788,000
Spencer reveals he’s not ready to live with Lauren despite her spending a lot of time around his place. Stephanie arranges a girls night at her house but is forced to rearrange when Josh gives her too many rules. Nicola and Binky come face-to-face for the first time and Nicola feels Binky is being fake with her pleasantries. After their first date, Jess agrees to go on a second with Andy unaware he’s planning a double date with Alex and Nicola. Stephanie and Josh’s relationship hits the rocks when she finds out he’s been confiding in her ex-boyfriends, and Lauren is smug by the situation.
93	3	"Oh My God, Tonsil Tennis Galore"	27 April 2015	60 minutes	722,000
Lauren and Stephanie’s ongoing rivalry escalates as rumours continue to fly around Chelsea. Andy meets Fleur an there’s an instant connection between the pair, but she’s hurt to hear he’s already going on another date with Jess. Louise reveals her relationship troubles to the girls as she feels Alik has changed since moving in with the boys, and Fleur still attempts to chase Andy despite him kissing Jess on their date. Andy has some explaining to do as he agrees to go on a date with Fleur, Louise confronts Alik about her worries, and Lauren has another run-in with Stephanie.
94	4	"I Don't Want Two Girlfriends, I Want One Girlfriend"	4 May 2015	60 minutes	877,000
Jess finally admits to fancying Andy before spending the night with Jamie. Meanwhile Andy kisses Fleur on their date, but soon realises that his true feelings are with Jess. New boy Elliot introduces himself to Lucy but she’s more drawn to his friend James, and Mark Francis goes on a mission to find Toff a boyfriend, unaware of her past with Elliot. Andy is crushed to find out the truth of Jamie and Jess’ night together and attempts to breaks things off with her but is shocked when she decides to fight for him. Elsewhere Binky goes on a first date with JP, and Louise and Alik refuse to accept responsibility for their problems.
95	5	"I Find It Impossible Not To Think About The Terracotta"	11 May 2015	60 minutes	851,000
The sexual tension between James and Lucy increases as they agree to go on a double date with Binky and JP. Toff plans a party where she and Elliot get closer, whilst Alex tells Nicola that he’s in love with her. With Alex away on tour, Jamie gives Jess an ultimatum after confesses his feelings towards her, but she makes a decision and goes to see Andy. The feud between Lucy and Josh is reignited when he warns James to stay away from her leaving Stephanie in an awkward position. Jess receives a blow when she pours her heart out to Andy only to find he’s having second thoughts.
96	6	"The Last Time I Saw Him I Was Naked In A Forest"	18 May 2015	60 minutes	838,000
Nicola is infuriated to hear that Jess has been saying she has unfinished business with Alex leaving her no choice but to confront her love rival. Sam reveals that he’s slept with Millie before taking her on a double date with Toff and Elliot. Lucy’s date with James is interrupted by Spencer and Lauren, and Lauren isn’t impressed when Spencer doesn’t back her up during her rant about Lucy. Elsewhere, Stephanie blames a shocked Lucy for the problems in her relationship, Jess feels betrayed by Jamie for going behind her back, and Nicola catches Alex and Jess having a cosy chat.
97	7	"She's Coming Round To My House For Cocktails And A Bit Of Foreplay"	25 May 2015	60 minutes	849,000
Jamie arranges a group ski trip but makes it clear to Spencer that he mustn’t bring Lauren along so that they can spend some quality boy-time together, however there’s clear animosity when Lucy is invited. Binky worries about the blossoming romance with JP fearing she can’t read him, whilst he is glad that the pair are on the same page. Spencer angers Lauren by making amends with Lucy, and he knows he has no choice but to return home early to fix his relationship. Elsewhere, Jess is shocked when Nicola orders Alex to tell her they can’t be friends anymore.
98	8	"What A Mortifying Insight Into People's Choice Of Nightwear"	1 June 2015	60 minutes	908,000
Lauren looks for a new place following an argument with Spencer and feels the only way she can move on from the drama is to meet Lucy and have it out. Binky begins to have second thoughts about JP, not knowing where she stands with him, but she is unaware he is also worried that they’re being too distant. As Sam grows closer to Millie, there’s a twist as it’s revealed he’s been seeing Tiff again, which leads to an awkward confrontation when the love rivals meet for the first time and Sam’s betrayal comes to light. Alik receives a call from his father asking him to move back home.
99	9	"There Are Two Types Of People In The World; Radiators And Drains"	8 June 2015	60 minutes	698,000
Elliot continues to pursue Toff but she’s completely put off by the fact that he keeps sending her intimate pictures leaving her no choice but to let him down gently. Louise admits she’s all for the long distant relationship with Alik, however he expresses his concern that he doesn’t think it will work. Lucy feels betrayed to discover her sister has been seeing Sam again, and has been having meetings with Stephanie behind her back, but Tiff admits she was scared to tell her the truth. Elsewhere, Jamie and Jess finally share a kiss, and JP and Binky get closer.
–	–	"100th Episode Special"	15 June 2015	60 minutes	–
A special episode hosted by Rick Edwards featuring cast past and present reuniting to discuss the history of the show.
100	10	"A Surprise Awaits Below The Surface"	15 June 2015	60 minutes	714,000
Lauren is wary when Spencer doesn’t return home after a night out with Jamie, and it’s clear that he’s hiding a secret from her. Lucy takes it on herself to do some investigating into Spencer’s life and isn’t happy with her findings. Alex begins to have doubts over his relationship with Nicola, whilst Jess and Jamie finally agree to go out with each other. Elsewhere, Louise gets emotional as Alik waves goodbye to Chelsea, and Mark Francis hosts a party. With Lucy getting closer to the truth, Spencer knows he has to be honest with Lauren and confesses to cheating on her.
101	11	"Relationships Shouldn't Be Stressful"	22 June 2015	60 minutes	816,000
Jamie becomes convinced that Lauren is to blame for Spencer’s recent wayward behaviour and warns him not to attempt to reconcile with her, and Alex is under pressure when Nicola questions him about his conversations with the boys. The group go to a festival where Toff and Sam teach Mark Francis to enjoy the festival lifestyle, and Lucy and James eventually make things official. With Spencer and Lauren back together, Jamie announces his disapproval and plans a boys holiday to LA. Meanwhile, Stephanie and Lucy put the past behind them and agree to be friends again.

== Ratings ==
Episode	Date	Official E4 rating	E4 weekly rank
Episode 1	13 April 2015	889,000	3
Episode 2	20 April 2015	788,000	3
Episode 3	27 April 2015	722,000	6
Episode 4	4 May 2015	877,000	2
Episode 5	11 May 2015	851,000	3
Episode 6	18 May 2015	838,000	3
Episode 7	25 May 2015	849,000	2
Episode 8	1 June 2015	908,000	2
Episode 9	8 June 2015	698,000	6
100th Episode Special	15 June 2015	–	–
Episode 10	15 June 2015	714,000	3
Episode 11	22 June 2015	816,000	1
Average		814,000	3
