= Pete & Sam's Reality News =

- Genre: Reality television Comedy
- Country of origin: United Kingdom
- No. of series: 2
- No. of episodes: 27

Production
- Running time: 15 minutes
- Production company: Monkey Kingdom

Original release
- Network: E4
- Release: 25 January – 13 December 2021

Pete & Sam's Reality News is a British television series, which is broadcast by Channel 4 on E4, All4, YouTube and Snapchat.

In each episode TOWIE's Pete Wicks and Made in Chelsea's Sam Thompson discuss reality television news and updates. It parodies news anchor shows, speaking solely about developments on reality TV shows. Each week the presenters are joined by guests. As of 2022, two series of the show have aired on British television.

== Background ==
The Made in Chelsea and The Only Way is Essex presenters first met on the reality series Celebs Go Dating in 2018. Since then, they have had a well-documented friendship. They began a reality news segment on Instagram, before it was picked up by Channel 4 in 2021.

It first aired on E4 on 25 January 2021 with 15 minute episodes.

== Broadcast ==
An initial six episodes were broadcast on Instagram, follow by the first season broadcast in January 2021 on E4. It was renewed for a second season, which premiered on 18 October 2021.

== Episodes ==
Series	Episodes	Originally released	
Series	Episodes	First released	Last released
1	18	25 January 2021	24 May 2021
2	9	18 October 2021	13 December 2021
