= Stephanie Pratt =

American television personality (born 1986)

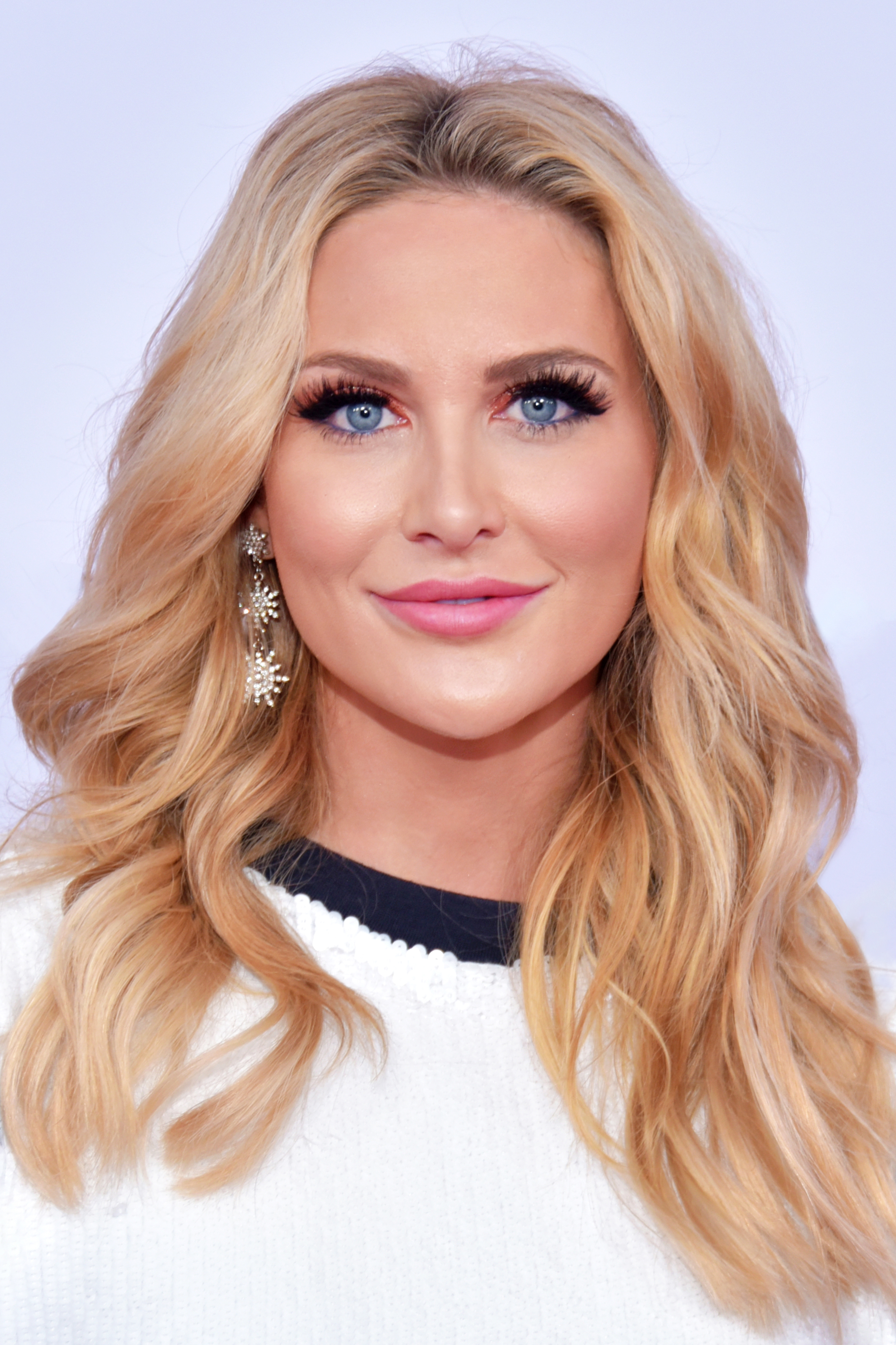
- Pratt in 2019
- Born: Stephanie Lynn Pratt; April 11, 1986 (age 40); Los Angeles, California, U.S.
- Education: Fashion Institute of Design & Merchandising (attended)
- Occupations: Television personality; businesswoman; fashion designer; model; author
- Years active: 2007–present
- Television: The Hills (2007–2010); Made in Chelsea (2013–2017); Celebrity Big Brother (2014); Celebs Go Dating (2016); The Hills: New Beginnings (2019)
- Political party: Republican
- Relatives: Spencer Pratt (brother); Heidi Montag (sister-in-law)

Stephanie Lynn Pratt (born April 11, 1986) is an American television personality. In 2007, she came to prominence after being cast in a supporting role on the reality television series The Hills. In 2010, the series saw Pratt become a primary cast member, joining Audrina Patridge, Lo Bosworth and Kristin Cavallari.

== Early life ==
Stephanie Lynn Pratt is the younger sister of Spencer Pratt and the sister-in-law of Heidi Montag (both of whom appeared on The Hills). She attended Crossroads School alongside co-star Whitney Port. She took courses at the Fashion Institute of Design & Merchandising in Los Angeles but does not have a degree.

== Career ==
In 2006, MTV developed the reality television series The Hills as the spin-off of Laguna Beach: The Real Orange County. It originally chronicled the lives of Lauren Conrad, who appeared on its predecessor, her housemate Heidi Montag, and friends Audrina Patridge and Whitney Port. In 2007, Pratt's brother Spencer began dating and later moved into an apartment with Montag, which led to the deterioration of her friendship with Conrad.

During the third season, Conrad ended her friendship with Montag after she suspected that Spencer was responsible for rumors of a sex tape involving her and her former boyfriend Jason Wahler; the ensuing feud between the three carried through each subsequent season. During production of the third season, Stephanie first appeared on the series while angrily confronting Conrad at a club. However, upon the realization that they attend the same college, they became friends. Their relationship put a burden on Pratt's relationship with her brother and Montag, who reacted by beginning to alienate her.

The fourth season saw Pratt's role increased, with more emphasis placed on her personal life. During the fifth season, Pratt began an internship with Kelly Cutrone's PR firm, People's Revolution, though Lauren ended Pratt's internship, per Cutrone's orders, due to poor performance. Despite rumors of not returning after the fifth, Pratt returned and was featured as a main cast member in the sixth and final season.

In 2013, Pratt made several appearances on television in the United Kingdom. This included being a guest on the spin-off of Celebrity Big Brother, as well as making a special appearance from episodes two onwards on season 6 of E4's Made in Chelsea, a British equivalent of The Hills. Pratt continued her role on the reality-series for the seventh series broadcast from April 2014. Furthermore, Pratt had a recurring role on spin-off show Made in Chelsea: NYC, which was broadcast from August 2014. On 18 August 2014, she entered the Celebrity Big Brother house for the fourteenth series as a housemate. Pratt lasted 19 days inside the house, before exiting on 5 September 2014. Pratt returned with a feature role for the eighth series of Made in Chelsea and met new boyfriend Josh Shepherd on the show. The couple's relationship moved from strength to strength with the pair enjoying Christmas of 2014 in Barbados. The couple then broke up during the filming of Made in Chelsea: LA.

Her memoir titled Made in Reality: From the Hills of L.A. to London's Made in Chelsea was released by Headline on August 13, 2015, and became a Sunday Times bestseller. In the book she discusses her relationships, struggles with drug addiction, eating disorder and the pressure of fame. In October 2016, she launched a now-defunct wellness website NutritionBySteph.com and supplements range called "To Be Honest".

MTV announced a reboot of The Hills entitled The Hills: New Beginnings at the MTV Video Music Awards on August 20, 2018. Pratt was announced as part of the cast of the new series. The series reunited the original cast members, alongside their children, friends, and new faces, and follows their personal and professional lives while living in Los Angeles. It premiered on June 24, 2019.

=== Fashion ===
Pratt has been featured in several magazines such as the UK's FHM and OK!, and the US's Maxim, H, Us Weekly and Runway. She was signed to MiLk Model Management, a London modelling agency, in 2016.

Pratt launched a jewelry collaboration with MeMe London in July 2015. She later became a permanent member of MeMe London's team and has hosted several events for the brand. In 2017, Pratt launched and modeled two collections for fashion brand Goddiva. The second collection titled "French Kiss Collection" included 40 pieces, such as floor length gowns and party dresses. Her third collection for the brand was released in fall 2018.

List of fashion and beauty collections by Stephanie Pratt
Year	Title	Brand	Notes
2015	"MeMe London by Stephanie Pratt"	MeMe London	Jewelry collection
2015	"South Beach 12 Piece Edit Swimwear Collection"	South Beach	Swimwear collection
2017	"Stephanie Pratt for Goddiva"	Goddiva	Clothing collection
2018	"French Kiss by Stephanie Pratt"	Goddiva	Clothing collection

== Personal life ==
Pratt is a Republican. She voted for John McCain in the 2008 United States presidential election.

She has struggled with bulimia in the past due to the pressure to be thin stemming from appearing alongside very thin co-stars on the show.

In April 2010, Pratt posed nude for PETA's "Be Nice to Bunnies" iPhone application, which is intended to help the public find stores and products that are kind to animals.

In early 2026, Stephanie came out against her brother Spencer Pratt's campaign in the 2026 Los Angeles mayoral election. In May 2026, she reversed her stance, and praised his campaign.

=== Legal issues ===
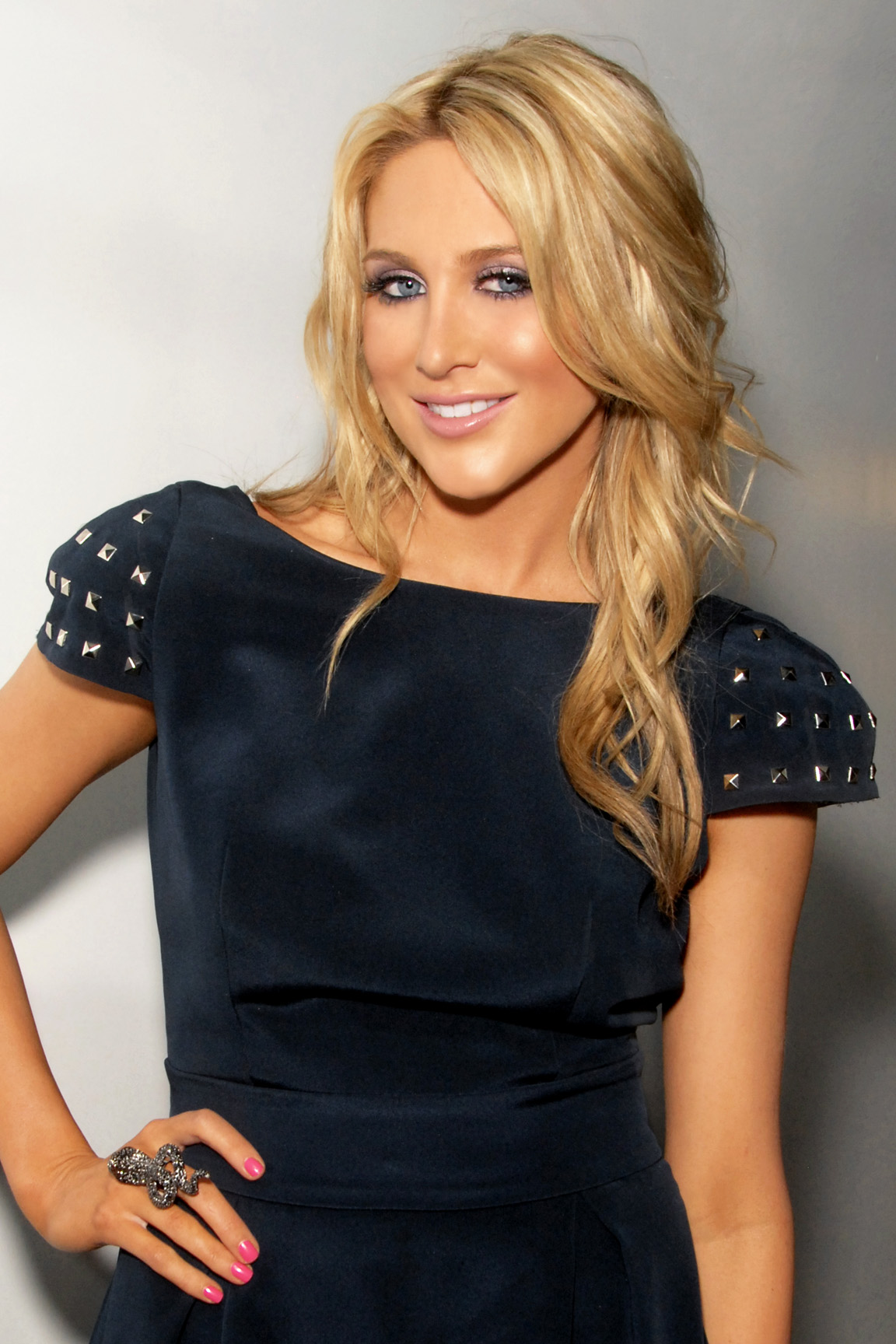
Stephanie Pratt in West Hollywood on February 2, 2010

In May 2006, while Pratt was on Oahu, she was arrested for stealing $1300 worth of clothing from Neiman Marcus. She was charged with second degree theft, and while in custody, police also found drugs in her possession. On May 31, 2020, Pratt tweeted to "Shoot the looters" after multiple stores burnt down during the Black Lives Matter George Floyd protests. Her comments were met with criticism given her 2006 shoplifting arrest, and her mugshot went viral.

In October 2009, she was arrested for driving under the influence after Holly Montag's birthday. Pratt claimed she drank one glass of wine, but blew a 0.08 after being pulled over for tinted windows. She was released after paying $5,000 bail and being sentenced to three year's probation, which she successfully completed.

== Filmography ==
Film and television roles
Year	Title	Role	Notes
2007–10	The Hills	Herself	Season 3–5 (recurring), Season 6 (main); 58 episodes
2010	The Spin Crowd	Herself	Episode: "The Final Straw"
2012	The Hit List with Stephanie Pratt	Herself / Host	4 episodes
2013–17	Made in Chelsea	Herself	Series 6 (recurring), Series 7 (main), NYC (recurring), Series 8–13 (main); 67 episodes
2014	Celebrity Big Brother	Herself	Series 14, 10th place
2015	Reality Bites	Herself / Team Member	"Episode #1.3" (Season 1, episode 3)
2016	Celebs Go Dating	Herself	5 episodes
2017	Drunk History: UK	Lady of the Lake	"Episode #3.3" (Season 3, episode 3)
2017	Virtually Famous	Herself / Panelist	"Episode #4.2" (Season 4, episode 2)
2018	The Story of Reality TV	Herself	TV documentary
2019	The Hills: New Beginnings	Herself	13 episodes

== Published works ==
- Made in Reality: From The Hills of L.A. to London's Made in Chelsea (2015)
