= List of Made in Chelsea cast members =

The following is a list of cast members of the British semi-reality television programme Made in Chelsea.

== Current cast ==
This is a list of the current cast members appearing in the show in order of their first appearance.

Cast member	Series	Episodes*	Year	Notes
Sam Prince	13–CRO, 22–current	133	2017–2018, 2021–current	
James Taylor	14–BA, 20–30, 32-current	151	2017–2025, 2026-current	5, 9, 10
Tristan Phipps	16, 18–current	157	2018, 2019–current	8
Maeva D'Ascanio	17–BA, 20–30, 32-current	128	2019–2025, 2026-current	9, 10
Angus Findlay	17–18, 22, 28–current	65	2019, 2021, 2024–current	
Oliver "Chuggs" Wallis	17, 30–current	30	2019, 2025–current	
Inga Valentiner	21–26 , 31-current	76	2021–2023, 2026-current	7
Yasmine Zweegers	24–27, 29–current	77	2022–current	
Jack Taylor	BBB, 27–current	55	2022, 2024–current	
David "Temps" Templer	25–current	82	2023–current	
Freddy Knatchbull	25–current	77	2023–current	10
Jazz Saunders	26–current	66	2023–current	
Jules Pollard	27–current	56	2024–current	
Sam "Vanderpump"	27–current	46	2024–current	
Zeyno Taylan	27–current	46	2024–current	
Rebecca "Beks" Collins	28–current	41	2024–current	
Abi Luffman	28, 30–current	15	2024, 2025–current	
Olivia "Livvy" Barker	29–current	34	2025–current	
Alice Yaxley	29–current	29	2025–current	
Kabir Khuruna	29–30, 32-current	11	2025, 2026-current	
Arman Pouladian-Kari	29–current	26	2025–current	
Julian Cash	30, 32–current	5	2025, 2026–current	
Kit Paterson	30–current	24	2025–current	
Georgia Stork	31–current	14	2026–current	
Philip Pollard	31–current	17	2026–current	
Maali Khan-Stokes	32–current	10	2026–current	
Liam Ventom	32–current	7	2026–current	
Eve Alero Vince-Odozi	32–current	6	2026–current	
James Westbrook Elliott	32–current	5	2026–current	

- ^*: All episode counts are correct as of Series 33, episode 10.
- ^Note 1: Cast Member was absent from NYC
- ^Note 2: Cast Member was absent from LA
- ^Note 3: Cast Member was absent from South of France
- ^Note 4: Cast Member was absent from Ibiza
- ^Note 5: Cast Member was absent from Croatia
- ^Note 6: Cast Member was absent from Buenos Aires
- ^Note 7: Cast Member was absent from Mallorca
- ^Note 8: Cast Member was absent from Bali & Bonjour Baby
- ^Note 9: Cast Member was absent from Corsica
- ^Note 10: Cast Member was absent from Sydney

== Former cast ==
This is a list of the former cast members appearing in the show in order of their last appearance.

Cast member	Series	Episodes	Year	Notes
Gareth Locke-Locke	16, 19–25, 28–current	89	2018, 2020–2026	
Ollie Locke-Locke	1–5, LA–13, 15–16, 19–25, 28–current	212	2011–2013, 2015–2017, 2018, 2020–2026	
Elys Hutchinson	31–current	10	2026	
Paris Smith	20-32	-	2020-2026	
Tabitha Willett	15–CRO, 18, 23, 29–30	33	2018, 2019, 2022, 2025	
Sophie Hermann	6–9, 14–22, 28–30	128	2013–2015, 2017–2021, 2024–2025	1
Olly Claxton-Newman	30	8	2025	
Molly Paradice	28, 30	9	2024–2025	
Demi Sims	29-30	9	2025	
Maddison Tarrant-Willis	30	5	2025	
Fredrik Ferrier	1–4, 12–23, 30	109	2011–2012, 2016–2022, 2025	4, 5
Ruby Adler	20–29	115	2020–2025	
Reza Amiri-Garroussi	18–29	118	2019–2025	
Olivia Bentley	11–SYD, 28–29	218	2016–2025	8
Miles Nazaire	15–19, 21–29	163	2018-2025	10
Lauren Sintes	26–29	40	2023–2025	
Harvey Armstrong	BA–28	108	2019–2024	7
Tiffany Watson	8–14, 19–23, 25–28	125	2014–2017, 2020–2022, 2023–2024	2, 9, 10
Christianne "Tina" Stinnes	7, 13, 27–28	21	2014, 2017, 2024	
Hugo MacKenzie-Wood	26–28	18	2023–2024	
Emily Blackwell	12–14, 16, 18–27	121	2016–2024	9, 10
Verity Bowditch	17–27	83	2019–2024	7, 8, 10
Imogen Bloom	25–27	13	2023–2024	10
Bella Sharpe	25–SYD	25	2023	
JJ Van Der Vliet	SYD	5	2023	
Nicole Berry	22, 26	12	2021, 2023	
Robbie Mullett	21–26	46	2021–2023	7
Joel Mignott	23–26	30	2022–2023	7
Willow Day	MAL–26	31	2022–2023	8
Geronimo Mörtl	COR	5	2023	
Jane Aubrun-Mautin	COR	5	2023	
Issy Francis-Baum	MAL–25	18	2022–2023	
Mel Hornbostel	25	6	2023	
Charlie Wicks	24–25	14	2022–2023	
Lily Ludovici-Gray	10, 24–25	16	2015, 2022–2023	
Billy Precup	25	6	2023	
Digby Edgley	14–18, 22–BBB	81	2017–2019, 2021–2022	
Georgia May Salamat	24–BBB	5	2022	
Jordan Oldershaw	24–BBB	5	2022	
Julius Cowdrey	12–14, 21–BBB	77	2016–2017, 2021–2022	
Melissa Tattam	15–20, 23–BBB	77	2018–2020, 2022	
India Hovenden	MAL	5	2022	
Malek Amro	MAL	5	2022	
Emma Walsh	10, 23	12	2015, 2022	
Mark-Francis Vandelli	1–23	199	2011–2022	
Sophie “Habbs” Habboo	14–23	105	2017–2022	
Victoria Baker-Harber	2–19, 21–23	144	2011–2022	2, 6
Jane Felstead	2, 4–13, 19–20, 22	34	2011, 2012–2017, 2020–2021	1, 2, 3
Sam Thompson	6–16, 18–22	174	2013–2021	2
Sarrah Jasmin	22	6	2021	
Sam Holmes	BA–20, 22	12	2019–2021	
Alex Mytton	5–21	163	2013–2021	
Amelia Mist	17–20	35	2019–2020	
Alexandra "Binky" Felstead	1–IBZ, 16, 19–20	159	2011–2018, 2020	
Freddie Browne	17–20	35	2019–2020	
Harry Baron	13–20	82	2017–2020	
Zara McDermott	18–20	24	2019–2020	
Will Higginson	20	7	2020	
Charlie Frederick	20	7	2020	
Rosi Mai Waldon	17–20	29	2019–2020	
Jamie Laing	2–20	224	2011–2020	
Louise Thompson	1–16, BA–19	180	2011–2020	
Ryan Libbey	SoF–16, BA	47	2016–2019	
Eliza Batten	16–18	19	2018–2019	
Oliver Proudlock	2–10, 12–18	119	2011–2019	2, 4, 5
Sammy Allsop	17–18	9	2019	
Hugo Leefe	17-18	8	2019	
Heloise "Ell" Agostinelli	15–16	8	2018	
Fran Newman-Young	5–9, 16	39	2013–2015, 2018	
Millie Wilkinson	9–11, 16	16	2015–2016, 2018	2
Mimi Bouchard	13–15, 16	31	2017–2018	5
Georgia Toffolo	7–15	100	2014–2018	1
Francis Boulle	1–6, 10, SoF–15	93	2011–2013, 2015–2018	4
Alik Alfus	NYC–SoF, 14–15	49	2014–2018	
Frankie Gaff	11–15	54	2016–2018	
Clementine Cuthbertson	14–15	6	2017–2018	
Charlie Mills	14	5	2017	
Ella Willis	13–14	18	2017	
Daisy Robins	13–14	15	2017	
Josh "JP" Patterson	9–IBZ	57	2015–2017	3
Akin Solanke-Caulker	12–13	15	2016–2017	
Stephanie Pratt	6–13	67	2013–2017	
Francesca "Cheska" Hull	1–NYC, 13	70	2011–2014, 2017	
Rosie Fortescue	1–13	126	2011–2017	2, 3
Jess Woodley	9–12	51	2015–2016	
Nick Summerfield	12	5	2016	
Matt Draper	11–SoF	9	2016	
Lukas Avalon	SoF	6	2016	
James Dunmore	9–11	34	2015–2016	
Lucy Watson	4–11	92	2012–2016	
Richard Dinan	3–5, 10–11	31	2012–2013, 2015–2016	
Nicola Hughes	9–11	19	2015–2016	2
Tallulah Rufus Isaacs	10–11	9	2015–2016	
Sam Harney	10	7	2015	
Elliot Cross	9–10	9	2015	2
Spencer Matthews	1–10	99	2011–2015	2
Emily Weller	9–10	5	2015	2
Gabriella Ellis	1–4, NYC, LA	36	2011–2012, 2014–2015	
Naz Gharai	LA	6	2015	
Olivia Fox	LA	5	2015	
Josh Shepherd	8–LA	16	2014–2015	
Catherine "Caggie" Dunlop	1–3, 9	24	2011–2012, 2015	
Amber Atherton	1–3, 9	18	2011–2012, 2015	
Lauren Frazer-Hutton	8–9	11	2014–2015	
Andy Jordan	4–9	64	2012–2015	1
Stevie Johnson	4–9	63	2012–2015	
Fleur Irving	9	5	2015	
Lonan O'Herlihy	8–9	10	2014–2015	
Will Colebrook	8	8	2014	
George Amor	8	5	2014	
Riley Uggla	7–NYC	13	2014	
Billie Carroll	NYC	6	2014	
Jules Hamilton	NYC	5	2014	
Ed "Fordy" Ford	7	6	2014	
Aurelie Mason-Perez	7	6	2014	
Phoebe-Lettice Thompson	5–6	21	2013	
Olivia Newman-Young	5	12	2013	
Millie Mackintosh	1–5	46	2011–2013	
Oscar Ligenza	5	5	2013	
Ashley James	4–5	11	2012–2013	
Josh Coombs	5	8	2013	
Carly Rothman	4–5	8	2012–2013	
Sophia Sassoon	4	9	2012	
Sam Cussins	4	6	2012	
Kimberley Garner	3	9	2012	
Hugo Taylor	1–3	28	2011–2012	
Natalie Joel	3	9	2012	
Gabilicious Tristao	1–3	8	2011–2012	
Alice Davidson	2	5	2011	
Chloe Green	2	8	2011	
Agne Motiejunaite	1	7	2011	
Funda Önal	1	6	2011	

- ^Note 1: Cast member was absent from NYC
- ^Note 2: Cast member was absent from LA
- ^Note 3: Cast member was absent from South of France
- ^Note 4: Cast member was absent from Ibiza
- ^Note 5: Cast member was absent from Croatia
- ^Note 6: Cast member was absent from Buenos Aires

== Duration of cast ==
{{very long}}

Current	Series																																									
Current	2011		2012		2013		2014			2015			2016			2017			2018			2019			2020		2021		2022				2023				2024		2025		2026	
Current	1	2	3	4	5	6	7	NYC	8	9	LA	10	11	SoF	12	13	IBZ	14	15	CRO	16	17	18	BA	19	20	21	22	23	MAL	24	BBB	25	COR	26	SYD	27	28	29	30	31	32
Sam P																																										
James T																																										
Tristan																																										
Angus																																										
Chuggs																																										
Maeva																																										
Paris																																										
Inga																																										
Yasmine																																										
Jack																																										
Freddy																																										
Temps																																										
Jazz																																										
Jules P																																										
Vanderpump																																										
Zeyno																																										
Abi																																										
Beks																																										
Alice Y																																										
Arman																																										
Kabir																																										
Livvy																																										
Julian																																										
Kit																																										
Georgia St.																																										
Philip																																										
Eve																																										
James W																																										
Liam																																										
Maali																																										
Past	Series																																									
Past	2011		2012		2013		2014			2015			2016			2017			2018			2019			2020		2021		2022				2023				2024		2025		2026	
Past	1	2	3	4	5	6	7	NYC	8	9	LA	10	11	SoF	12	13	IBZ	14	15	CRO	16	17	18	BA	19	20	21	22	23	MAL	24	BBB	25	COR	26	SYD	27	28	29	30	31	32
Elys																																										
Gareth																																										
Ollie																																										
Demi																																										
Molly																																										
Olly																																										
Sophie																																										
Tabitha																																										
Fredrik																																										
Maddison																																										
Lauren S																																										
Miles																																										
Olivia B																																										
Reza																																										
Ruby																																										
Harvey																																										
Tiff																																										
Tina																																										
Hugo M-W																																										
Emily B																																										
Verity																																										
Imogen																																										
Bella																																										
JJ																																										
Nicole																																										
Robbie																																										
Willow																																										
Joel																																										
Geronimo																																										
Jane A-M																																										
Charlie W																																										
Issy																																										
Lily																																										
Mel																																										
Billy																																										
Digby																																										
Georgia Sa.																																										
Jordan																																										
Julius																																										
Melissa																																										
India																																										
Malek																																										
Emma																																										
Mark-Francis																																										
Habbs																																										
Victoria																																										
Jane F																																										
Sam T																																										
Sarrah																																										
Holmes																																										
Alex																																										
Amelia																																										
Binky																																										
Freddie																																										
Harry																																										
Zara																																										
Will H																																										
Charlie F																																										
Rosi																																										
Jamie																																										
Louise																																										
Ryan																																										
Eliza																																										
Proudlock																																										
Sammy																																										
Hugo L																																										
Ell																																										
Fran																																										
Millie W																																										
Mimi																																										
Toff																																										
Francis																																										
Alik																																										
Frankie																																										
Clementine																																										
Charlie M																																										
Ella																																										
Daisy																																										
JP																																										
Akin																																										
Stephanie																																										
Cheska																																										
Rosie																																										
Jess																																										
Nick																																										
Matt																																										
Lukas																																										
James D																																										
Lucy																																										
Richard																																										
Nicola																																										
Tallulah																																										
Harney																																										
Elliot																																										
Spencer																																										
Emily W																																										
Naz																																										
Olivia F																																										
Gabriella																																										
Josh S																																										
Lauren F-H																																										
Andy																																										
Stevie																																										
Fleur																																										
Lonan																																										
Will C																																										
George																																										
Riley																																										
Billie																																										
Jules H																																										
Fordy																																										
Aurelie																																										
Phoebe																																										
Olivia NY																																										
Millie M																																										
Oscar																																										
Ashley																																										
Josh C																																										
Carly																																										
Sophia																																										
Sam C																																										
Kimberley																																										
Caggie																																										
Hugo T																																										
Natalie																																										
Amber																																										
Gabilicious																																										
Alice D																																										
Chloe																																										
Agne																																										
Funda																																										

== Cast changes and storylines ==
The first season saw Amber Atheton, Binky Felstead, Caggie Dunlop, Cheska Hull, Francis Boulle, Fredrik, Funda Önal, Gabriella Ellis, Hugo Taylor, Mark-Francis, Millie Mackintosh, Ollie Locke, Rosie Fortescue and Spencer Matthews rise to fame on the new-fresh semi-reality TV show and all made their first appearances in the first episode of the first series, whilst another cast member Agne joined the cast in the second episode after she was hired to be Francis’ intern. Louise Thompson appeared briefly during the fifth episode to advise Funda on her relationship with Spencer, but did not appear for the remainder of the series as this was only a minor appearance. Funda Önal left the series after 6 episodes following the breakdown of her relationship with Spencer Matthews, and Agne left during the final episode of the series after resigning from being Francis' intern. She does not return.

The second season featured a few changes in the cast. Louise returned to the show as a more permanent cast member. Though she had other commitments in Edinburgh which had caused her to be absent from some episodes. Chloe Green, Jamie Laing and Victoria Baker-Harber also made their debut during the first episode. Alice Davidson, a cousin of Caggie Dunlop, joined the show during the seventh episode and had a brief romance with cast member Proudlock. However she quit after the Christmas special airing after the second series. Chloe also decided to quit the show following her split with Ollie and did not return for the third series.

The third season began in early 2012 and featured new arrivals to the cast including Richard Dinan, Kimberley Garner and Natalie Joel. Gabilicious Tristao appeared in the first episode of the series but did not feature for the remainder as she quit later on from the show. This was the last season to feature many original cast members including Amber Atherton, who only appeared for two episodes this series. As well as Caggie Dunlop, who only appears in three episodes after flying to Australia in hope for a music career, and Hugo Taylor. Caggie does appear in the season final to help Spencer on a very important decision. Despite the arrival of Natalie Joel at the beginning of the series, this was the only series she appeared in as she did not return for the next.

The first episode of the fourth season saw the arrivals of new cast members Sam Cussins & Stevie Johnson with Andy Jordan, whilst Sophia Sassoon was introduced in the third episode. Carly Rothman and long-stand cast member Lucy Watson both made their arrivals during the fifth episode, and Ashley James made her first appearance in the ninth episode. However, during the Christmas special episode at the end of the series original cast member Gabriella Ellis announced she'd be leaving the series. This episode was also the final episode to feature Fredrik Ferrier, and Sophia and Sam, who departed after one series.

In 2013, several new cast members were introduced during Season 5. Sisters Fran and Olivia Newman Young, Phoebe-Lettice Thompson all made their first appearance during the first episode of the series, while Josh Acoombs made his debut during the second episode as an ex-boyfriend of Phoebe. This, however, is the only series to feature Josh as he did not return for Series 6. Ollie's friend Oscar Ligenza briefly joined the series appearing in just 5 episodes. Alex Mytton arrived during the eighth episode. The last episode of the series was the final episode to feature original cast members Ollie Locke and Millie Mackintosh as they quit the show for personal reasons. As well as Richard who had appeared from the third series onwards. Ashley also made her final appearance during this series.

Season 6 saw the introduction of Sam Thompson, Sophie Hermann and Stephanie Pratt who all had connections with already established cast members with Sam being Louise's brother, Sophie being Victoria's friend and Stephanie being Spencer's then-girlfriend. Olivia departed the series after only appearing in the first episode, whilst the final episode of the series seen the departures of Phoebe, and original cast member Francis Boulle.

The seventh season in 2014 saw no new cast members arrive until the fourth episode where Sam Thompson's ex-girlfriend Riley Uggla was introduced as well as her friend Aurelie Mason-Perez. Stephanie also returned during this episode after only appearing in the previous series as a guest. Ed "Fordy" Ford made his debut during the sixth episode and later went on to date Louise Thompson, and Georgia "Toff" Toffolo arrived during the seventh episode. This was the only series to feature Aurelie and Fordy after they decided not to return.

The group took to New York City for a spin-off series, which saw the introduction of Alik Alfus and Billie Carroll during the first episode, and Jules Hamilton in the second. Cheska decided to return to London during the second episode. This was later confirmed as her final episode as she did not return for the eighth season. Gabriella Ellis also made a very brief one-off return during the third episode for Binky's birthday party with drinks all the way. The series featured all of the Chelsea cast, however, there were notable absences from Andy, Sophie and Toff, who returned during the eighth series. Whilst Alik remained returned following the NYC special. Both Billie and Jules did not.

The eighth season began in October and featured the arrival of both Lonan O'Herlihy and Will Colebrook in the first episode as well as Tiffany Watson, who is the sister of already established cast member Lucy. George Amor was introduced during the second episode as a new love interest of Victoria. Josh Shepherd made his first appearance for the show during the fifth episode of the series as a friend of Stevie, and Lauren Frazer-Hutton debuted during the ninth episode as Spencer's new girlfriend. Despite no official word of their departures from the show, Will and George did not return for the ninth series.

Ahead of the ninth season in 2015, it was confirmed that five new cast members had been added to the show. These included Emily Weller, Jess Woodley, Millie Wilkinson, Fleur Irving and Josh "JP" Patterson, who are all already friends of already established cast members. This is also the first series to include Nicola Hughes, who joined the series as the girlfriend of Alex, as well as new cast members James Dunmore and Elliot Cross. The ninth series was the last to include long-serving cast member Andy Jordan, who left to pursue a music career. Stevie Johnson, who appeared alongside Jordan from Series 4, announced his departure in August 2015.

Made In Chelsea LA, premiered in the summer of 2015. Which saw the gang head to LA with the usual drama. The third spin-off saw the returns of Gabriella Ellis and Ollie Locke. As well as newcomers to the season. This was Ellis' last appearance in the show and in 2022, now rebranded to London Ellis, said she regretted returning to the show. Ollie Locke returned as a main cast member up until Season 13 (2017).

Season 10 saw another long-serving cast member leave the show, Spencer Matthews left the show on 16 November 2015.

Season 11 was the last to feature cast members Lucy Watson and James Dunmore. The series also had the first appearance of Frankie Gaff, Olivia Bentley and other cast members. Throughout the season, viewers saw Jamie Laing and Frankie Gaff enter a relationship in late season 11. At the end of the season, after Pratt's and Watson's dramatic argument, Lucy Watson chose to leave the show as she expressed that the argument wasn't portrayed in the way it went down off-screen. Thus she didn't want the show to get in the way of her relationship with James.

The third spin-off, Made in Chelsea: South of France, premiered in the summer of 2016, just months after Lucy's exit. The 6-Episode Mini-Show set in the hot yet cold as ever beaches of France welcomes the long-awaited return of Francis Boulle along with a shocking return of Louise's former boyfriend, Alik Alfus, who was going to propose to her before finding a new boyfriend, Ryan Libbey. This was a one-off for Alik as he doesn't return for a while, whereas Francis has come back for good. We also see new recruits such as Matt Draper who goes on to date Jess Woodley.

Season 12 saw the continuation of Jamie and Frankie's toxic relationship. While Jess Woodley is furious of Toff hanging out with Tiffany after her backstabbing. She does not appear further and her last appearance is in the season party, after the final.

The thirteenth season is the last to feature over 100-Episodes homecomer Rosie Fortescue, the last appearance of Cheska Hull and Binky, Josh, Ollie Locke and Stephanie Pratt. Rosie only appears briefly in the only 4 episodes she is in for her final season. Her last being a meet up with Sam Thompson about his relationship with Tiff Watson. There are new recruits too. The main permanent recruit being Mimi Bouchard. At Binky's baby shower, Cheska Hull makes her return and reunites with her and best friend Ollie Locke. They all leave the series together. Though Binky makes a brief appearance in Ibiza. Binky's boyfriend JP along with Ollie's best friend Steph Pratt also leave. Due to this, the show plummeted down in ratings for its 14th season until drama boosts it back up...

The fourth spin-off series is set in Ibiza. Jamie and Frankie end their relationship, which had been strained since the eleventh series. Tiffany learns that Sam cheated on her with Mimi, which later leads to her departure early in the fourteenth series. The series marks JP's final appearance, and Binky and Ollie's last appliances for an extended period.

Season 14 was the last to feature Tiffany Watson. It was also the first to feature new members Sophie "Habbs" Habboo, James Taylor, Digby Eldgey and the return of Alik Alfus in the later episodes when he moves back to London. Mimi has drama throughout the series. At the start being with Tiff over Ibiza. And her then-boyfriend Charlie Mills. Who she later said they weren't meant to be. Which Charlie in response didn't take it well and almost threw a drink in her face. It is the last we see of him. At the end of the series, Alik and Louise come to terms after his rivalry with Ryan. People started questioning Liv Bentley and Digby's relationship when it became unhealthy for the pair of them criticizing each other. Even Olivia's friends stepped in. Including Frankie. But Digby convinced Liv that she was trying to "sabotage" them in a turn around to put the blame on someone else. This caused a fall out between Liv and Frankie.

Season 15 is a milestone for Made in Chelsea. The season saw newbies Miles Nazire and Ell introduced to the show. As well as Harry Barron's girlfriend Melissa Tattam. Shockingly, it was the last season to feature Georgia "Toff" Toffolo. Along with Francis Boulle for the last time, Alik and even Frankie herself. Frankie leaves in Episode 4 after a huge row with Liv and Digby at Mimi's fancy dress-up party. She bumps into Jamie after leaving the room filled with intoxicated drama and tells him she can't be in a room with negativity like that. Frankie said her final goodbye to Jamie. Later on, Melissa and Harry's relationship is involved with Liv and Digby's. And the couple's start blaming each other for their mess and problems. Towards the final, Alik and Ryan finally make amends mainly for Louise. After a guest appearance from Alik's father Mitch. Jamie meets Ell. And they get on and start dating each other. Despite Miles' interest. Though it turns out Miles and Ell are just French friends. The gang celebrate the year with a party.

Croatia aired again in the summer of 2018. Liv and Melissa sort their drama out as Liv breaks down. Thankfully, the two recover and put the water under the bridge. This is the last time we see Sam-Prince after Miles finds out he slept with Tabitha, who played both of them. Sam doesn't believe Miles and leaves later on. During the trip, Sam Thompson and Habbs go on a rollercoaster of fancying each other to cheating on each other. This unfortunately does not end here as the drama is brought back to London...

The sixteenth season had no permanent cast changes. However, this was the last season to feature Louise Thompson and fiancé Ryan Libbey. As well as Mimi Bouchard, who only appeared for a cameo. The season saw more drama from Habbs and Sam Thompson as at the final chapter Habbs ended things with him. They both make amends in the Christmas Special. The season also features multiple but brief returns. Such as Fran Newman, Millie Wilkinson and Binky Felstead. Binky however appears for majority of Episode 3 as she returns celebrate Louise and Ryan's engagement party.

The seventeenth season features newcomers Rosi Mai, Freddie, Angus, Amelia and Verity, along with the first appearance of Miles' ex, Maeva D'Ascanio. The season features arguments with Rosi Mai and Maeva, and a love triangle with James Taylor, Verity and Eliza.

Series 18 sees Sam Thompson return as he finds out about Jamie and Habbs' relationship. Maeva and James become officially exclusive. It's the last series to feature Eliza.

Buenos Aires sees the gang head to the tropical city to explore more friendships and drama. We see Jamie and Habbs' relationship stumble up and down, as Louise Thompson returns along with Ryan Libbey to help Sam over his girlfriend Zara McDermott.

The 19th season has the ultimate return of Ollie Locke and Binky Felstead. Along with Binky's mum Jane and Ollie's husband Gareth. There is drama between Liv and Melissa after Liv accuses her of trying to mess in other people's relationships. Louise returns for the final time in scenes with her brother Sam Thompson and the return of Tiff Watson. There is some juicy drama between Tiff and Zara throughout her return.

In the twentieth season, Sam and Zara clash after Zara reveals a secret. They end up getting back together by the end of the series. It is the last season to ever feature Zara McDermott, Harry Barron, Rosi-Mai and Binky Felstead. Midway through the series, there is tension between Verity and Tristan. Who broke up during the pandemic. They argue about seeing other people as the returns of Maeva D'Ascanio and James Taylor causes a stir as Maeva sticks her nose in other people's business as Verity wines on. In the final episode, it is Ollie Locke and Gareth Locke's wedding, Binky returns for her final ever appearance to be there with her best friend, Ollie. The gang cheers to 2020 with a conclusion.
