= Made in Chelsea: Croatia =

- No. of episodes: 6

Release
- Original network: E4
- Original release: 6 August – 10 September 2018

Season chronology
- ← Previous; Series 15 Next → Series 16

Made in Chelsea: Croatia, a spin-off series of Made in Chelsea, a British structured-reality television programme which began airing on 6 August 2018, and concluded after 6 episodes on 10 September 2018. The series was confirmed on 21 May 2018 This was a stand-alone series which was not promoted as the sixteenth series. The sixteenth series followed later in the year. This is the fifth spin-off show filmed away from Chelsea following NYC in 2014, LA in 2015, South of France in 2016, and Ibiza in 2017.

The series includes the feud between Harry and Sam T as both throw each other's relationships under the bus. It also includes Tabitha and Miles briefly getting together before it's revealed she's been seeing Sam P back in Chelsea, and the final nail in the coffin for Digby and Olivia's relationship. Following this series it was announced that Sam Prince would not be returning to the show, and that this was his final series. Prince made his return to the show for series 22 in 2021.

== Cast ==
- Alex Mytton
- Digby Edgley
- Harry Baron
- Heloise "Ell" Agostinelli
- Jamie Laing
- Louise Thompson
- Mark-Francis Vandelli
- Melissa Tattam
- Miles Nazaire
- Olivia Bentley
- Ollie Locke
- Ryan Libbey
- Sam Prince
- Sam Thompson
- Diana Larionov
- Sophie “Habbs” Habboo
- Sophie Hermann
- Tabitha Willett
- Victoria Baker-Harber

== Episodes ==
No. overall	No. in season	Title	Original release date	Duration	UK viewers
186	1	"I'm Like Zeus And He's Hercules"	6 August 2018	60 minutes	712,000
Jamie and Ell enjoy their first holiday together, but Miles is a thorn in their side as Jamie is convinced he’s going to try and steal his girl. Digby is apprehensive about reuniting with the group following the fallout with Sam, and Olivia extends an olive branch. Elsewhere Habbs is smitten with Sam unaware he’s told her a white lie about his time in Vegas, Jamie warns Ell that Miles is not to be trusted, and Sam refuses to apologise to Olivia. After coming face-to-face with each other for the first time since their drama, Sam and Olivia finally bury the hatchet and make amends.
187	2	"Take It To The Grave"	13 August 2018	60 minutes	771,000
Harry agrees to remain quiet about Sam’s secret fling in Vegas but runs straight to Melissa with the information. Jamie is overjoyed to learn that Miles and Tabitha have got together, but she’s wary of how close he is Ell. Melissa wastes no time in letting Habbs know about Sam’s lies, but it’s Harry with the one with explaining to do when Sam realises he can no longer trust his friend so throws him under the bus instead. Elsewhere Tabitha blames Ell when Miles lets her down gently, and Jamie isn’t convinced that Harry is telling the truth to his girlfriend.
188	3	"You’re A Reptile, Mate"	20 August 2018	60 minutes	748,000
Olivia and Digby hit another obstacle in their relationship when their bickering goes public, whilst Jamie becomes determined to uncover the truth about Harry's night with another girl in Vegas. Sam worms his way back into Habbs’ good books, and Alex turns up to catch up on the gossip. Sam is shocked by Jamie’s meddling when he reveals that Diana, the girl from Vegas, has arrived in Croatia to meet him, and he wastes on time in questioning her about Harry. As the group gather for a meal, Harry is left red faced when Diana exposes his lies. Elsewhere, Tabitha finds herself a date, and Sam is put in a difficult situation as he’s questioned by both Habbs and Diana.
189	4	"If You Can’t Remember It, It Never Happened"	27 August 2018	60 minutes	712,000
Diana confronts Sam as she accuses him of playing with both her and Habbs’ feelings, whilst Harry is determined to move forward with Melissa despite the rumours flying around. Jamie makes it his mission to make Harry suffer for betraying Sam, and Habbs meets up with Diana to find out the true extent of Sam’s lies. Elsewhere Melissa tells Jamie to stop interfering with her relationship with Harry, and Habbs has a decision to make about her romance with Sam, which ultimately leads to him deciding to head back to England. Meanwhile Harry and Diana clear the air.
190	5	"Keep Your Friends Close But Keep Your Enemies Closer"	3 September 2018	60 minutes	746,000
Melissa feels that she hasn’t had Habbs’ full support during the turbulent times with Harry, and confides in Diana over her worries. Tabitha reveals she’s been seeing somebody back in London, just as Miles announces he’s slept with her once again. Melissa and Habbs clash over their recent issues, and Sam P arrives in Croatia as Tabitha’s mystery man. Miles wastes no time in revealing the truth to Sam P about his night with Tabitha, whilst the rift between Habbs and Melissa causes problems. Sam P confronts Tabitha over the rapidly spreading rumours but she denies the allegations.
191	6	"It’s Been A Lovely Setting For Bad Circumstances"	10 September 2018	60 minutes	715,000
Sam T is back in Croatia, but this time with Louise and Ryan in tow for moral support, and Diana faces backlash when she comes face-to-face with an angry Louise defending her brother. Sam P is torn over what to believe but ultimately decides to give Tabitha a second chance. Sam T is left broken to discover messages Habbs has sent to her ex-boyfriend about him, but makes it his mission to work on their issues. Elsewhere Ryan jumps to Sam T’s defence by laying into Harry, Louise disapproves of Sam T’s decision to take Habbs back, and Olivia realises her and Digby want different things.

== Ratings ==
Episode	Date	Official E4 rating	E4 weekly rank
Episode 1	6 August 2018	712,000	3
Episode 2	13 August 2018	771,000	4
Episode 3	20 August 2018	748,000	2
Episode 4	27 August 2018	712,000	5
Episode 5	3 September 2018	746,000	6
Episode 6	10 September 2018	715,000	4
Average		734,000	4
