= Louise Thompson =

Louise Thompson may refer to:

- Louise Thompson Patterson (1901–1999), née Louise Thompson, social activist
- Louise Thompson (TV personality)
- Louise Thomson (curler) in 1980 Canadian Ladies Curling Association Championship
- Louise Thomson (referee), football referee from Northern Ireland
