= Made in Chelsea series 16 =

Made in Chelsea
- Series 16
- No. of episodes: 11

Release
- Original network: E4
- Original release: 8 October – 17 December 2018

Series chronology
- ← Previous; Croatia Next → Series 17

The sixteenth series of Made in Chelsea, a British structured-reality television programme began airing on 8 October 2018 on E4, and concluded on 24 December 2018 following eleven episodes, and a "Big Christmas Quiz" special episode presented by Mollie King and Matt Edmondson. Ahead of the series it was announced that Georgia "Toff" Toffolo, Francis Boulle and Sam Prince would not be returning to the series. Alik Alfus was also absent from the series following his appearance on Celebs Go Dating. Instead, new cast members include Tristan Phipps and Eliza Batten. Former cast member Emily Blackwell returned to this series as a regular once again whereas Fran Newman-Young, Millie Wilkinson, Mimi Bouchard and Binky Felstead all made a brief one-off return. This series heavily focused on both Olivia and Digby coming to terms with the breakdown of their relationship before an illegitimate kiss with Miles gives them a huge decision to make. It also includes a brief romance for Sam and Habbs, and Fred and Sophie revisiting their spark, and Miles continuing to annoy the women in his life. During the series it was announced that original cast member Ollie Locke had quit the show, therefore this was his final series.

== Cast ==
- Alex Mytton
- Alexandra "Binky" Felstead
- Digby Edgley
- Eliza Batten
- Emily Blackwell
- Fran Newman-Young
- Fredrik Ferrier
- Harry Baron
- Heloise "Ell" Agostinelli
- James Taylor
- Jamie Laing
- Louise Thompson
- Mark-Francis Vandelli
- Melissa Tattam
- Millie Wilkinson
- Mimi Bouchard
- Miles Nazaire
- Oliver Proudlock
- Olivia Bentley
- Ollie Locke
- Ryan Libbey
- Sam Thompson
- Sophie “Habbs” Habboo
- Sophie Hermann
- Tristan Phipps
- Victoria Baker-Harber

== Episodes ==
No. overall	No. in season	Title	Original release date	Duration	UK viewers
192	1	"If That’s A Slapped Arse Then Slap Me Now"	8 October 2018	60 minutes	990,000
Struggling with the recent break-up, Olivia moves back to Chelsea in an attempt to get some closure from Digby. Melissa discovers that Emily has been bad mouthing her relationship with Harry, whilst Habbs ends things with Sam for good after one too many betrayals. Olivia tears up after an emotional confrontation with Digby. Meanwhile things get awkward when Melissa and Emily come face-to-face for the first time, and Sam notices Habbs getting close to a face from his past, Tom. Ollie introduces his fiancé to the group.
193	2	"I Hate When My Human Side Comes Out"	15 October 2018	60 minutes	984,000
Jamie comes up with a plan to stop Sam from making any more mistakes in his life, whilst Habbs notices a connection between her new flatmates Miles and Emily. Olivia is fuming with Miles for rubbing Digby’s new single life in her face, and is even more hurt to discover he’s arranged a double date with him. Sam gives into temptation and reaches out to Habbs despite Jamie advising him against it, and Fran, Millie and Mimi give him tough love in an attempt to get him to change his ways. Elsewhere Olivia gives Digby a taste of his own medicine, and Sophie is on a mission.
194	3	"I Love It When You Get Deep And Dirty"	22 October 2018	60 minutes	1,098,000
Louise and Ryan announce their engagement to the group. Despite Olivia trying to move on with Harison, she is rocked after discovering he’s been getting close with Emily. Habbs enjoys a date with new boy Tristan, which leaves Sam heartbroken. Binky makes a surprise return for Ryan and Louise’s engagement party, whilst Sam makes one last plea for Habbs’ love – but it’s Tristan who she goes home with. Elsewhere Olivia and Digby’s feud continues to divide Chelsea, and Miles is a guinea pig in Sophie’s new project.
195	4	"Rule Number One, Never Give Back The Diamonds Darling"	29 October 2018	60 minutes	1,074,000
Louise is thrown into panic when she can’t answer any questions about her wedding plans. Sam desperately plots to win back Habbs but Tristan stands in his way. Olivia and Digby give into temptation and end up in bed together again, but both are left more confused than before over their situation. Sam embarrasses himself by interrupting Habbs’ date with Tristan to confess his love for her, whilst Ryan lays into Olivia over her mistreatment of Digby. Habbs finally agrees to hear Sam out. Sophie gives Miles lessons on how to treat women.
196	5	"I Shan’t Be Climbed"	5 November 2018	60 minutes	1,073,000
The pressure is on for Habbs as she has a huge decision to make. Louise feels stuck in the middle of her friend and her fiancé as both Olivia and Ryan continue to bicker. Victoria decides she needs a new companion but Mark Francis doesn’t approve of her choice. Elsewhere Ollie takes Olivia to see a therapist in order to get her life back on track, and Sam refuses to give up on Habbs despite her still dating Tristan. Olivia and Digby meet up and agree to put the past behind them, whilst Tristan confronts Habbs after finding out she’s decided to get back together with Sam.
197	6	"You’re A Beggy Little Bitch"	12 November 2018	60 minutes	1,005,000
Habbs and Emily reach the end of their tethers with Miles as he continued to bring girls back to their flat, and Olivia offers to host an engagement photo shoot for Ryan and Louise. Jamie confides in Tristan over his fears that Sam may not be the best man for Habbs, who finds pleasure in feeding back this information to Habbs herself. Miles is shocked when the girls confront him over their living arrangements; meanwhile Ryan and Olivia bury their feud for the sake of Louise. Sam questions Jamie’s loyalty, and Harry and Melissa go head-to-head with Miles and James.
198	7	"Some Would Say That I’m The King Of A Gesture"	19 November 2018	60 minutes	994,000
Tristan makes it his mission to rekindle Miles’s friendship with Habbs and Emily, but Sam is convinced he has an ulterior motive. Louise and Ryan notice a spark between Sophie and Fred and urge them both to act on it. Elsewhere Sam goes all out to impress Habbs by getting a key cut to his house, but his friends are concerned that he’s moving too quickly. Miles goes a step too far causing ructions between him, Habbs and Emily, whilst Olivia plans a trip to Canada for Harry’s birthday. Sam confides in Habbs about his insecurities.
199	8	"I’m Going To Redeem Myself And Make Sure Everyone Loves Me"	26 November 2018	60 minutes	926,000
Harry and Melissa are far from impressed when their trip to Canada is gate crashed by their arch enemies. Olivia lays down the law when she fears that Miles’s appearance could spell trouble, whilst Louise is overwhelmed when Mark Francis attempts to find the perfect wedding venue for her. Jamie causes more problems when he tries to bring Fred and Sophie together, unaware that Fred wouldn’t want to pursue anything further in case he damaged their friendship. A drunken Olivia kisses both James and Miles before facing backlash from her friends. Elsewhere Sophie promises payback for Jamie.
200	9	"You And I Have Gone Down A Very Dark Track"	3 December 2018	60 minutes	953,000
A broken hearted Digby discovers the truth about Miles and Olivia’s kiss in Canada. Habbs becomes concerned over Sam’s speed in their relationship and confides in Melissa that she’s having second thoughts. A divide forms between the boys as Miles’s betrayal is the hot topic of conversation, meanwhile Ollie plans a spectacular launch for his new book. Fred welcomes new girl Eliza onto the scene, and Olivia faces a tough conversation with Digby. Habbs breaks down as she realises she can’t string Sam along any longer before making a very difficult decision.
201	10	"I Was Too Blind To Hear It"	10 December 2018	60 minutes	980,000
Jamie prepares to turn 30 as his friends plan the ultimate birthday party for him. Louise vents her frustration out on Habbs for the mistreatment of her brother, whilst Jamie feels guilty for not contacting Sam in his hour of need. Digby refuses to have anything to do with Miles following his betrayal but contemplates getting back together with Olivia. Elsewhere a fearless Habbs stands up to Louise, and Sam and Jamie finally rekindle their lost friendship. Digby offers James a word of warning over Miles, and Proudlock gives Jamie some much needed birthday advice.
202	11	"I Think The Best Thing About Christmas Is Once It’s All Over"	17 December 2018	60 minutes	863,000
Louise and Ryan are delighted to welcome a new dog into their family. Olivia plans a huge gesture for Digby unaware that he’s not ready to rekindle their relationship because of the lack of trust. Elsewhere Miles and James compete to get Eliza’s attention, and Sam is distraught when he sees Habbs with another man. Jamie does his best efforts to put a smile on Sam’s face for Christmas, whilst Digby is brutally honest with Olivia about his feelings. Fred and Sophie share a special Christmas kiss, and Victoria isn’t feeling very festive.
–	–	"Big Christmas Quiz"	24 December 2018	60 minutes	521,000
Presented by Mollie King and Matt Edmondson, the cast reunite to take part in a quiz of the series.

== Ratings ==
For the first time, catch-up service totals were added to the official ratings.

Episode	Date	Total E4 viewers	Total E4 Weekly Rank
Episode 1	8 October 2018	990,000	2
Episode 2	15 October 2018	984,000	2
Episode 3	22 October 2018	1,098,000	2
Episode 4	29 October 2018	1,074,000	2
Episode 5	5 November 2018	1,073,000	3
Episode 6	12 November 2018	1,005,000	3
Episode 7	19 November 2018	994,000	4
Episode 8	26 November 2018	926,000	3
Episode 9	3 December 2018	953,000	3
Episode 10	10 December 2018	980,000	3
Episode 11	17 December 2018	863,000	3
Big Christmas Quiz	24 December 2018	521,000	4
Average		995,000	3
