= Made in Chelsea series 15 =

Made in Chelsea
- Series 15
- No. of episodes: 11

Release
- Original network: E4
- Original release: 12 March – 21 May 2018

Series chronology
- ← Previous; Series 14 Next → Croatia

The fifteenth series of Made in Chelsea, a British structured-reality television programme began airing on 12 March 2018 on E4, and concluded on 28 May 2018 following eleven episodes, and an "End of Season Party" special hosted by Ellie Taylor. Ahead of the series it was announced that Tiff Watson had quit the show for good, having previously announced that she'd just be taking a break. New cast members for this series include Melissa Tattam and Miles Nazaire, as well as Heloise "Ell" Agostinelli and Tabitha Willett who joined later in the series. Stanley Johnson also made his first appearance during this series with Toff following their appearances together in the seventeenth series of I'm a Celebrity...Get Me Out of Here! This was the final series to include cast members Clementine Cuthbertson and Frankie Gaff, who quit the midway through the series. This series heavily focused on the breakups and makeups of Digby and Olivia's troubled relationship, as well as the strain on Louise and Ryan when her ex-boyfriend Alik moves back to London. It also includes Sam T attempting to move on from his last girlfriend, and Harry and Melissa's blossoming romance.

== Cast ==
- Alex Mytton
- Alik Alfus
- Clementine Cuthbertson
- Digby Edgley
- Francis Boulle
- Frankie Gaff
- Fredrik Ferrier
- Georgia “Toff” Toffolo
- Harry Baron
- Heloise "Ell" Agostinelli
- James Taylor
- Jamie Laing
- Louise Thompson
- Mark-Francis Vandelli
- Melissa Tattam
- Mimi Bouchard
- Miles Nazaire
- Oliver Proudlock
- Olivia Bentley
- Ollie Locke
- Ryan Libbey
- Sam Prince
- Sam Thompson
- Sophie “Habbs” Habboo
- Sophie Hermann
- Tabitha Willett
- Victoria Baker-Harber

== Episodes ==
| No. overall | No. in season | Title | Original release date | Duration | UK viewers |
|---|---|---|---|---|---|
| 175 | 1 | "I Wanna Know Who She Is And Where She’s Come From" | 12 March 2018 | 60 minutes | 849,000 |
With Harry and Melissa happy together in a new relationship, they’re unaware that rumours of incriminating texts are being spread around Chelsea. Jamie’s torn when his new love interest visits London and is more keen to stay than he is, whilst Harry clashes with Mimi when he discovers he’s being talked about. Elsewhere Ryan and Alik come face-to-face once again and agree to call a truce, and Harry is backed into a corner and is forced to give Melissa an explanation. Toff is excited about her new career move, and James and Frankie get closer.
| 176 | 2 | "Mimi Has Got A Boyfriend, Everyone Else Stay Calm" | 19 March 2018 | 60 minutes | 856,000 |
Melissa seeks answers from Mimi when she continues to drag Harry’s name through the mud, whilst Alik tries his luck with Habbs. With Melody thinking about sticking around in London for longer, she is unaware that Jamie has lost interest in her. Elsewhere Louise finally agrees to be civil with Alik, and Harry clashes with Mimi over the rumours she’s spreading about him. Melody hears second hand that Jamie has been slating her, leaving her no choice but to confront him, and Mark Francis gives Toff a life lesson on how to deal with stress.
| 177 | 3 | "Honestly, I’ve Never Felt Like This Before" | 26 March 2018 | 60 minutes | 645,000 |
Olivia is put in an awkward situation when she discovers that Digby and Frankie actually hate each other, whilst Mimi plans a sexy pyjama party. Olivia has some explaining to do when word gets round that she’s not entirely sure on her relationship with Digby. James asks Toff out on a date, and Ben asks Mimi to be his girlfriend. Elsewhere Olivia and Frankie lock horns over the Digby situation, and Jamie is forced to apologise to Melody before meeting up with his new girlfriend. After deciding to avoid the drama, Frankie leaves Chelsea to focus on herself.
| 178 | 4 | "I’m Tortoise Sitting For My Neighbour" | 2 April 2018 | 60 minutes | 700,000 |
Olivia calls Habbs out for getting too involved in her relationship, whilst Toff feels she’s too busy for any romance with James just yet. Alex is torn when Miles tells him something he knows about Digby, and Louise and Ryan prepare to celebrate their second anniversary. Alex contemplates what to do with the information he’s heard, but is unaware that Olivia has already found out. Sam’s brief fling with Emilia comes to a crushing end. Elsewhere Digby has some explaining to do, and Ryan feels uneasy after bumping into Alik and his Dad during a romantic meal with Louise.
| 179 | 5 | "Therapy Is Therapeutic, This Is Not Therapy" | 9 April 2018 | 60 minutes | 705,000 |
Alik revels in Louise and Ryan’s misery as they hit a rocky patch in their relationship. Meanwhile Sam P is delighted when his new girlfriend Jemima starts to integrate into the group, and Miles sets his sights on Sophie. Harry and Sam P’s feud is reignited once again, whilst Jamie fears that Ryan maybe isn’t the one for Louise following a conversation with Sam T. Habbs confronts Sam P after hearing a rumour of him getting with another girl. Jemima tells Harry to stop making comments about her new romance, and Ryan and Louise face up to their problems.
| 180 | 6 | "Don’t Look At Me When You’re Taking Your Pants Off Please" | 16 April 2018 | 60 minutes | 801,000 |
Jemima announces that Sam P is dead to her after he finally confesses to cheating on her several times, and Mark Francis seeks help from Alex as he tries to pursue his new career as a DJ. Louise feels bad for Ryan when she realises the boys are choosing Alik over him, leaving her no choice but to intervene. Sam P feels betrayed when he discovers that Jemima and Miles have hooked up, and Ryan reaches out to Alik to put their differences to one side. Elsewhere Jemima lashes out at Sam P, and Francis is jealous of Mark Francis.
| 181 | 7 | "He Needs A Taste Of His Own Medicine" | 23 April 2018 | 60 minutes | 767,000 |
Jamie finds another way of getting under Harry’s skin, unaware that he actually has the upper hand. Olivia feels like she’s missing out by staying in every night with Digby but fears having a conversation with him about it. Melissa is used as a pawn in Jamie and Harry’s game, whilst the boys try to get Alik’s life back on track. Harry plans a trip to Sri Lanka to cheer Olivia up, leaving Melissa rattled when she finds out she hasn’t been invited despite being Harry’s girlfriend. Elsewhere after seeking much needed advice, Olivia tells Digby about her worries in their relationship.
| 182 | 8 | "I Literally Just Tried To Talk Dirty In Latin" | 30 April 2018 | 60 minutes | 776,000 |
Ollie returns to Chelsea. Olivia is annoyed with Harry for finally giving in and inviting Melissa along to Sri Lanka despite originally telling her it was a singles holiday. Whilst on holiday, Sam T and Habbs get flirty, and Melissa and Olivia clash. Back in London, Ollie plays Cupid by setting Toff and James up on a date, and Mark Francis splashes the cash to buy Alik’s new artwork. Digby sees an incriminating photo of Olivia and Miles getting close in Sri Lanka, but she faces upset of her own as she realises that it’s for the best that she ends the relationship when she gets home.
| 183 | 9 | "No One Wants To Shag Just A Personality" | 7 May 2018 | 60 minutes | 740,000 |
Olivia reaches a bad place as she battles with her conscience over whether to end things with Digby or not, but his sweet talking causes a U-turn. Louise faces her demons as she’s forced to make a public speech at her book preview, whilst Sam T and Habbs make it clear to each other that they don’t want their recent fling to just be a holiday romance. Elsewhere Toff and James agree that they’re better off as friends, and Harry, Alex and Miles feel that Olivia is better off without Digby, but she finally makes her decision and chooses to stay with him despite what her friends think.
| 184 | 10 | "It Is Baller To Be Bad In Bed" | 14 May 2018 | 60 minutes | 860,000 |
Jamie introduces his new girlfriend to the group but is rocked when Francis suggests that she’s too young for him. Olivia continues to keep Digby on his toes as Alex fears she may have an ulterior motive for doing so. Elsewhere James revels in Sam T’s misery when Habbs accidentally shares too much information about him, and following her accident, Sophie recruits Miles in helping her move about more. Habbs confronts James for twisting things, whilst Olivia admits to pushing Digby to his limit in order for him to end it with her, which proves successful when he finally admits he’s had enough.
| 185 | 11 | "Darling, Sabotage Is Such An Ugly Word" | 21 May 2018 | 60 minutes | 788,000 |
When Toff announces she wants to host a big tea party, Ollie and Sophie wade in with their ideas and compete for her approval. Melissa is overwhelmed when Harry moves in with her, whilst Jamie spots a connection between Miles and Ell. Sam T is fully supportive of a newly single Olivia unaware that she’s still meeting up with Digby behind everyone’s backs. Ollie is far from impressed when Sophie sabotages his plans, and Jamie can’t control his jealousy when he comes face-to-face with Miles. Sam T lays into Olivia when he finds out she’s giving her relationship another go, but she chooses her boyfriend over her friends.
| – | – | "End of Season Party" | 28 May 2018 | 60 minutes | 452,000 |
Presented by Ellie Taylor, the cast reunite to discuss events from the series.

== Ratings ==
| Episode | Date | Official E4 rating | E4 weekly rank |
|---|---|---|---|
| Episode 1 | 12 March 2018 | 849,000 | 4 |
| Episode 2 | 19 March 2018 | 856,000 | 3 |
| Episode 3 | 26 March 2018 | 645,000 | 9 |
| Episode 4 | 2 April 2018 | 700,000 | 6 |
| Episode 5 | 9 April 2018 | 705,000 | 5 |
| Episode 6 | 16 April 2018 | 801,000 | 4 |
| Episode 7 | 23 April 2018 | 767,000 | 4 |
| Episode 8 | 30 April 2018 | 776,000 | 4 |
| Episode 9 | 7 May 2018 | 740,000 | 4 |
| Episode 10 | 14 May 2018 | 860,000 | 3 |
| Episode 11 | 21 May 2018 | 788,000 | 4 |
| End of Season Party | 28 May 2018 | 452,000 | 10 |
| Average | | 772,000 | 5 |
