= Andy Jordan (TV personality) =

- Born: Andrew Mark Jordan; London, England
- Genres: Acoustic, folk, pop
- Occupations: Singer, TV personality
- Years active: 2010–present
- Spouse: Alexandra Suter (m.2023)

Andrew Mark Jordan is an English television personality and singer. He became more widely known after joining E4's television programme Made in Chelsea in its fourth series. Jordan later left the show in 2015 in order to focus on his music career. Diverging from his previous folky sound, he is now focusing on a collection of soul and jazz-influenced records. He also owns a small chain of clothing stores in Devon, Cornwall and elsewhere called JAM Industries.

== Early life ==
Born in 1990, Jordan was educated at St Edward's School, Oxford and went on to study geography at The University of Leeds. He learned to surf at the age of 15, after going on holiday to Cornwall with his best friend.

== Made in Chelsea ==
Jordan first joined the cast of the television show Made in Chelsea in 2012. He went on to appear in 66 episodes before leaving the show three years later in 2015 after the ninth series.

== Music ==
In an interview with the London Evening Standard, Jordan said "I take live inspiration from Michael Jackson and James Brown… Recording wise I love soul music."

On 21 October 2013, Jordan released "Whole Lot of Water" on iTunes. The song reached 71 in the UK Singles Chart and as of September 2015, has over 160,000 views on YouTube. On 12 May 2014, he released a music video for the song "Geography", which was also the name of his debut EP released the following month. The EP went on to sell over 10,000 copies independently. After embarking on two nationwide tours that saw him play a total of 29 dates, Jordan is readying the release of his second EP and has worked both in Nashville, Tennessee and with British songwriters such as Sam McCarthy and KATYA.

Having broken with his previous management company, in January 2019 Jordan announced that the management of his music career would be taken over by his co-writer and producer Benedict Gibbon.
