= Made in Chelsea: Ibiza =

- No. of episodes: 6

Release
- Original network: E4
- Original release: 31 July – 4 September 2017

Series chronology
- ← Previous; Series 13 Next → Series 14

Made in Chelsea: Ibiza, a spin-off series of Made in Chelsea, a British structured-reality television programme, was confirmed on 11 April 2017 and began airing on 31 July 2017. The series concluded on 4 September 2017 after six episodes. It was announced that the cast of Made in Chelsea would be travelling to Ibiza to film a special series of the show. It was revealed that this would be a stand-alone series which would not be promoted as the fourteenth series. The fourteenth series followed in October 2017. This is the fourth spin-off show filmed away from Chelsea following NYC in 2014, LA in 2015, and South of France in 2016.

The cast for the series was revealed on 19 July 2017, and only features some of the Made in Chelsea cast, with notable absences from Francis Boulle, Fredrik Ferrier, Oliver Proudlock, Rosie Fortescue and Stephanie Pratt. Despite announcing they'd left the show, Alexandra "Binky" Felstead and Josh "JP" Patterson made a brief appearance during the third episode during a video chat with some of the cast. The series focused heavily on the final nail in the coffin for Sam T and Tiff's turbulent relationship following their attempt at taking a break, as well as Jamie and Frankie both realising that they're better off apart. It also included the rivalry between Olivia and Julius escalating, and Sam P betraying Toff one too many times.

== Cast ==
- Alex Mytton
- Alexandra "Binky" Felstead
- Daisy Robins
- Ella Wills
- Emily Blackwell
- Frankie Gaff
- Georgia "Toff" Toffolo
- Harry Baron
- Jamie Laing
- Josh "JP" Patterson
- Julius Cowdrey
- Louise Thompson
- Mark-Francis Vandelli
- Mimi Bouchard
- Olivia Bentley
- Ryan Libbey
- Sam Prince
- Sam Thompson
- Tiff Watson
- Victoria Baker-Harber

== Episodes ==
No. overall	No. in season	Title	Original release date	Duration	UK viewers
158	1	"I Don’t Have A Problem With The Bloke, I Just Think His Girlfriend’s Hot"	31 July 2017	60 minutes	808,000
As the group arrive in Ibiza, news spreads that Sam T and Tiff are on a break. Whilst Emily starts to get smitten with Harry, she’s unaware that he’s still pursuing Frankie despite her having a boyfriend. Sam P puts himself on a plate for Toff but the pair agree that they’re better off as friends, and Mimi swoops in to the delight of Sam T. Elsewhere both Frankie and Jamie confront Harry over his accusations about them, and Emily ends things with him after she is enlightened over comments made about her.
159	2	"I’m Doing Things I’ve Never Done Before And I’m Loving It"	7 August 2017	60 minutes	666,000
Sam T and Mimi continue to grow closer, much to the despair of Olivia and Frankie, who are then put in an awkward situation when they discuss with Tiff the rules that they have set each other during the break. Meanwhile Emily is manipulated by Harry, and Sam P has a confession to make to Toff over a one night stand he’s had in her bed. Frankie clashes with Harry once again when they come face-to-face, whilst Sam T and Mimi face the wrath of Olivia when she hears about the pair’s kiss.
160	3	"He’s Been Living In La La Land Out Here"	14 August 2017	60 minutes	837,000
Louise’s arrival puts a spanner in the works for Sam T and Mimi when she forces him to think about his life back home. Alex goes on the hunt for a man for Olivia but his plan backfires, whilst Frankie struggles when Jamie returns to London for work commitments. Emily is left red faced when Harry and Frankie rekindle their friendship and accuses them both of flirting with each other, and Sam P desperately tries to salvage something with Toff but is given a stern warning from Victoria. Elsewhere Louise confronts Mimi over her brother’s growing feelings.
161	4	"She’s A Black Widow"	21 August 2017	60 minutes	764,000
Things go from bad to worse for Sam T when Tiff shows up in Ibiza. Following another run-in with Frankie, Emily breaks things off with Harry and announces she’s heading back to England. Tiff is left broken to discover Sam T has fallen for Mimi, and he’s forced into a difficult situation. After ending the relationship with Tiff, Sam T’s guilt leads him to put a stop to the romance with Mimi. Olivia isn’t sure about her latest love interest, whilst Sam P seeks advice from Mark Francis. Mimi and Tiff come to blows when the pair finally come face-to-face.
162	5	"You More Than Anybody Knows A Good Rebound"	28 August 2017	60 minutes	766,000
A divide starts to form within the group as Tiff and Sam T’s rivalry escalates. Frankie begins to realise she’s much happier in Ibiza without Jamie, whilst Ella and Julius’s arrival causes disruption for Olivia. Sam T rages when Tiff confesses to also sleeping with somebody whilst they were on their break, and his anger boils over when she brings a date to a group dinner party. Elsewhere Mimi feels isolated by the girls, Olivia clashes with Julius, and Jamie returns to greet a hostile Frankie, who decides to break up with him.
163	6	"Just A Friendly Reminder, Breaks Don’t Work"	4 September 2017	60 minutes	803,000
With news spreading that Sam P and Olivia have shared a little kiss, Julius makes it his mission to cause misery for his rival. Jamie struggles to come to terms with his breakup with Frankie, but the boys reassure him that the decision was for the best. Toff is left broken when she discovers Olivia’s betrayal. Mimi fails to make amends with Tiff, and Olivia confronts Julius over the rumours he’s started. Elsewhere, Harry discovers Jamie’s secret hook-up, and back in London, Emily and Frankie patch up their friendship.

== Ratings ==
Episode	Date	Official E4 rating	E4 weekly rank
Episode 1	31 July 2017	808,000	1
Episode 2	7 August 2017	666,000	6
Episode 3	14 August 2017	837,000	2
Episode 4	21 August 2017	764,000	1
Episode 5	28 August 2017	766,000	4
Episode 6	4 September 2017	803,000	6
Average		774,000	3
