= Made in Chelsea series 14 =

Made in Chelsea
- Season 14
- No. of episodes: 11

Release
- Original network: E4
- Original release: 9 October – 18 December 2017

Series chronology
- ← Previous; Ibiza Next → Series 15

The fourteenth series of Made in Chelsea, a British structured-reality television programme began airing on 9 October 2017 on E4, and concluded on 25 December 2017 following eleven episodes and a "Christmas Ding Dong" special episode hosted by Rick Edwards. This series featured the return of former cast members Sophie Hermann and Alik Alfus, having last appeared in the ninth series and South of France spin-off respectably. This was the only series to include new cast member Charlie Mills. Other new cast members include Digby Edgley, James Taylor, Sophie "Habbs" Habboo and Clementine Cuthbertson. It was the final series to include Daisy Robins, Emily Blackwell, Ella Willis and Julius Cowdrey following their unannounced departures during the series. Tiff Watson also announced that she had left the series and would not return for the fifteenth. The series focused heavily on the aftermath of Jamie and Frankie's break-up as they both try to move on from each other, as well as Olivia's new blossoming romance with Digby, and Louise and Ryan's relationship hitting the rocks following the return of her ex-boyfriend Alik. It also included Tiff and Sam T finally accepting they're better off apart.

== Cast ==
- Alex Mytton
- Alik Alfus
- Charlie Mills
- Clementine Cuthbertson
- Daisy Robins
- Digby Edgley
- Ella Wills
- Francis Boulle
- Frankie Gaff
- Fredrik Ferrier
- Georgia “Toff” Toffolo
- Harry Baron
- James Taylor
- Jamie Laing
- Julius Cowdrey
- Louise Thompson
- Mark-Francis Vandelli
- Mimi Bouchard
- Oliver Proudlock
- Olivia Bentley
- Ryan Libbey
- Sam Prince
- Sam Thompson
- Sophie “Habbs” Habboo
- Sophie Hermann
- Tiff Watson
- Victoria Baker-Harber

== Episodes ==
No. overall	No. in season	Title	Original release date	Duration	UK viewers
164	1	"I Don’t Like Vegans, I Don’t Like Feminists And I Don’t Like People Who Are Gluten Free"	9 October 2017	60 minutes	689,000
A newly single Jamie is determined to meet somebody else so hosts a singles party. Olivia is forced into a confrontation with Julius when Ella tells her she’s made no efforts to make amends with him, but the bickering pair agree that they still aren’t friends. As Daisy welcomes her old friend Charlie into the group, she’s far from impressed to hear that he already has a past with Mimi. Elsewhere Tiff prepares the launch of her new vegan restaurant, but her feud with Mimi is ignited when she learns she’s written a negative article about it. Louise offers Jamie some friendly advice, and Julius is thrown into a panic when a blast from the past appears.
165	2	"It’s Just Difficult To Tell Your Friends What’s Going On"	16 October 2017	60 minutes	678,000
Olivia and Saffron team up against Ella and Julius. As Mimi tries to pursue Charlie, she is unaware that Tiff has also grown to like him, sparking more fireworks between the rivals. Jamie confesses to the boys that he’s back in contact with Frankie following a heart-to-heart with Francis. Meanwhile Louise fears her relationship is experiencing some problems, and Olivia refuses to invite Ella to her birthday party. Tiff is encourages to date Charlie despite his connections with Mimi, and Ella and Saffron clash over Julius.
166	3	"Our Future Is Doomed"	23 October 2017	60 minutes	716,000
Ryan and Louise finally admit that there are issues within their relationship, and Sophie returns to teach Jamie how to date properly. Mimi is shocked to hear that Tiff has swooped in to claim Charlie, and Alex tells a heartbroken Sam T of Tiff’s recent hook-ups including Harry. Charlie is torn as both Mimi and Tiff fight for his affections, and Sam T has no choice but to confront Harry. Elsewhere Jamie is convinced Sophie is playing hard to get, and Ryan and Louise attempt to patch things up between them.
167	4	"The Boy Learnt To Walk In Loaffers, He Will Probably Die Wearing His Loaffers"	30 October 2017	60 minutes	729,000
Jamie comes up with ideas of how to spice up Ryan and Louise’s sex life, whilst Mimi and Charlie decide to pick new outfits for each other. Toff is under pressure when Mark Francis assigns her an important mission, and Tiff is left red faced when more rumours surface, this time regarding Sam P. Elsewhere Sam P makes a confession to Sam T about what really happened between him and Tiff, and Louise isn’t impressed to hear that Sophie influenced Ryan’s decision when buying her lingerie. Tiff strongly denies the accusations against her, but news from Olivia confirms Sam T’s worst nightmare.
168	5	"I Don’t Think You Can Have A Proper Relationship Until You’ve Had Your Heart Broken"	6 November 2017	60 minutes	735,000
Tiff continues to deny the rumours surrounding herself and Sam P. Mimi is taken aback when she realises that Charlie is a lot more keen about starting a relationship than she is, so decides to put an end to their brief romance before someone gets hurt. Harry and Sam P clash over their recent dramas, meanwhile Olivia is head over heels for new boy Digby, and Sophie causes a frosty atmosphere between her and Mimi after agreeing to go on a date with Fred. Elsewhere, Tiff cuts all ties with Sam T before leaving Chelsea, and Alex plans a trip to Italy.
169	6	"Aluminium Is Not Really My Style"	13 November 2017	60 minutes	831,000
Louise and Proudlock make it their mission to pick Sam T back up again as he continues his downward spiral. Sophie is appalled to hear that Mimi has been warning Fred to stay away from her, and Harry and Frankie share a moment as they get close in Italy. Elsewhere Olivia is happy with the way things are going with Digby, Ryan has a huge gesture for Louise, and Sophie erupts with Mimi when the pair come face-to-face. Sam T finally sees the light at the end of the tunnel, and Harry and Frankie agree to go on a date when they return to London.
170	7	"We Don’t Need To Go Down Memory Lane Dude"	20 November 2017	60 minutes	631,000
Louise receives an unpleasant surprise when she sees that Alik has returned to London to pursue a career, and Jamie takes his anger out on Alex after hearing about Harry and Frankie’s romantic spark. Sophie lets Fred down gently when she fears that she’s leading him on, and Harry agrees to step back from Frankie after Jamie drops a bombshell. There’s a violent confrontation when Alik causes trouble for Ryan, whilst Digby is nervous as he finally meets Olivia’s parents. Elsewhere, after all of the recent drama, Louise tells Alik to stay out of her life.
171	8	"I Won’t Have A Buffet Until I’m Dead"	27 November 2017	60 minutes	649,000
Sam T lays into Alik about his behaviour towards Louise and Ryan. Mark Francis and Victoria are tasked with arranging Toff’s birthday party but are shocked by her requests, whilst Frankie asks James out on a date. Harry and Sam P’s feud is reignited once again, and Louise meets up with Alik to clear the air. When Louise hears that Victoria has been badmouthing her to Alik, she’s no choice but to confront her once friend. Elsewhere Alex hits it off with Habbs, and Toff celebrates her birthday in style.
172	9	"Two Can Play At That Game"	4 December 2017	60 minutes	564,000
Jamie is left heartbroken when he spots Frankie and James on a date together and comes up with a plan to get his own back. Olivia and Digby reach the next step in their relationship as they finally make things official, and Louise is angry as Sophie requests that a shirtless Ryan carries her in to her circus themed party. Clementine is overjoyed by her connection with Jamie, unaware it’s part of his plot to get back at Frankie, whilst James isn’t keen on the baggage that Frankie is carrying. Elsewhere Alex and Habbs get closer.
173	10	"I’m More Domesticated Than A Cat"	11 December 2017	60 minutes	813,000
As Alex is unsure about his feelings for Habbs, Harry swoops in and asks her on a date instead. Jamie continues to use Clementine to get back at Frankie despite the boys advising against it, but an angry Frankie discovers the truth and exposes his secret. Clementine gives Jamie a piece of her mind, whilst Alex accuses Harry of being a snake. Elsewhere Digby’s dinner party descends into chaos when Frankie, James, Clementine and Jamie all come face-to-face and more secrets are out in the open. As Frankie is adamant she’s over Jamie for good, will James believe her?
174	11	"Who Do You Think Deserves A Good Whipping This Year?”"	18 December 2017	60 minutes	750,000
Alex makes a move on Habbs causing more tension between him and Harry, whilst Olivia and Digby are delighted to be spending their first Christmas together. Frankie feels that Olivia hasn’t been supporting her enough recently so makes her feelings known, and Alex confronts Harry after hearing that he’s been badmouthing him. Elsewhere Louise is over the moon to receive a promise ring from Ryan, Frankie ends her relationship with James after coming to a realisation, and Olivia and Digby confess their love for each other.
–	–	"Christmas Ding Dong"	25 December 2017	60 minutes	516,000

== Ratings ==
Episode	Date	Official E4 rating	E4 weekly rank
Episode 1	9 October 2017	689,000	7
Episode 2	16 October 2017	678,000	7
Episode 3	23 October 2017	716,000	7
Episode 4	30 October 2017	729,000	7
Episode 5	6 November 2017	735,000	6
Episode 6	13 November 2017	831,000	3
Episode 7	20 November 2017	631,000	7
Episode 8	27 November 2017	649,000	7
Episode 9	4 December 2017	564,000	7
Episode 10	11 December 2017	813,000	4
Episode 11	18 December 2017	750,000	6
Christmas Ding Dong	25 December 2017	516,000	4
Average		707,000	6
