= Made in Chelsea: Buenos Aires =

Reality TV series

- No. of episodes: 4

Release
- Original network: E4
- Original release: 9 December – 30 December 2019

Season chronology
- ← Previous; Series 18 Next → Series 19

Made in Chelsea: Buenos Aires, a spin-off series of Made in Chelsea, a British structured-reality television programme began airing on 9 December 2019, and concluded on 30 December 2019 following four episodes and a special "End of Yah Quiz" hosted by Matt Edmondson and Mollie King. This makes this the shortest of the show's "Out of Chelsea" spin-offs. The series was confirmed on 4 November 2019 when it was announced that the cast of Made in Chelsea would be travelling to Buenos Aires, Argentina to film a special version of the show, however the final episode of the series was filmed back in Chelsea. This was the sixth spin-off series of the show, but the first to air outside of its usual Summer schedule.

Whilst some of the cast appeared in this series, it also featured notable absences from Eliza Batten, Oliver Proudlock and Victoria Baker-Harber. The new cast members who joined the show included Harvey Armstrong and Sam Holmes. The series heavily focused on new cast member Harvey coming between close friends Habbs and Olivia, as well as Tristan and James's friendship being tested as their partners Verity and Maeva's feud continued. It also featured Sam and Zara facing their first lovers tiff.

== Cast ==
- Alex Mytton
- Amelia Mist
- Emily Blackwell
- Freddie Brown
- Fredrik Ferrier
- Harry Baron
- Harvey Armstrong
- James Taylor
- Jamie Laing
- Louise Thompson
- Maeva D'Ascanio
- Mark Francis Vandelli
- Melissa Tattam
- Miles Nazaire
- Olivia Bentley
- Reza Amiri-Garroussi
- Rosi Mai Waldon
- Ryan Libbey
- Sam Holmes
- Sam Thompson
- Sophie “Habbs” Habboo
- Sophie Hermann
- Tristan Phipps
- Verity Scarlett Bowditch
- Zara McDermott

== Episodes ==
No. overall	No. in season	Title	Original release date	Duration	UK viewers
227	1	"Argentina Baby"	9 December 2019	60 minutes	526,000
In Buenos Aires, a broken Habbs tries to heal following another betrayal from Jamie, whilst newly single Olivia is determined to enjoy her life. Tristan is torn as warring Miles and James compete to spend time with him, and Habbs is shocked to come face-to-face with Harvey, her ex-boyfriend. Jamie arrives in Argentina desperate to win Habbs back, but he’s disappointed when he realises he doesn’t have the support he wished for from his friends. Verity and Tristan agree to communicate more in their relationship, Miles sets his sights on a number of girls, and Habbs tells Jamie she needs time to process things.
228	2	"I Wish I Was A Narcissist"	16 December 2019	60 minutes	595,000
Habbs agrees to meet Harvey for a catch-up but is left gobsmacked by his home truths about her relationship with Jamie. Elsewhere James tells Verity that Tristan doesn’t love her, and Olivia gets closer to Harvey. Tristan begs James and Maeva to clear the air with Verity, but their double date ends in disaster as the warring pair drift further apart. Maeva and Verity’s feud is reignited when Rosi’s living arrangements are brought into question, whilst Jamie rages when he discovers that Harvey’s opinion has had an effect on his and Habbs’ relationship. Tristan asks Verity to be his girlfriend, and Olivia feels guilty after spending the night with Harvey.
229	3	"I Have A Girlfriend… On Paper"	23 December 2019	60 minutes	581,000
Habbs feels betrayed when she discovers that Olivia and Harvey have spent the night together again, whilst Maeva is furious when she finds out that Tristan has given James an ultimatum in order for things to be civil for Verity. Back in Chelsea, Sam desperately tries to mend his relationship with Zara when it hits the rocks, and Louise returns to console her brother. Alex defends Olivia’s actions when she defends herself to Habbs, Maeva and Verity discuss their bickering boyfriends, and Sam confronts Zara. There’s further strain on Olivia and Habbs’ broken friendship when more information comes to light, and Jamie is there to pick up the pieces.
230	4	"Let’s Get Married"	30 December 2019	60 minutes	784,000
Sam is desperate to make amends with Zara following their recent fallouts, whilst Habbs shares the gossip from Argentina to the girls back in Chelsea. Mark Francis teaches Rosi and Maeva how to recycle unwanted Christmas gifts, whilst Verity is delighted to have Tristan back in her arms again. Olivia agrees not to pursue Harvey for the sake of her friendship with Habbs, but Habbs feels the trust has already been broken between them. Elsewhere following weeks of animosity, James and Tristan finally call a truce, Sam and Zara sort out their differences, and Maeva discusses her future living arrangements with Rosi.
–	–	"End of Yah Quiz"	30 December 2019	60 minutes	TBA
Presented by Mollie King and Matt Edmondson, the cast reunite to take part in a quiz of the series.

== Ratings ==
Episode	Date	Official E4 rating	E4 weekly rank
Episode 1	9 December 2019	526,000	9
Episode 2	16 December 2019	595,000	8
Episode 3	23 December 2019	581,000	3
Episode 4	30 December 2019	784,000	5
End of Yah Quiz	30 December 2019	396,000	9
Average		622,000	6
