= Amber Atherton =

British entrepreneur (born 1991)

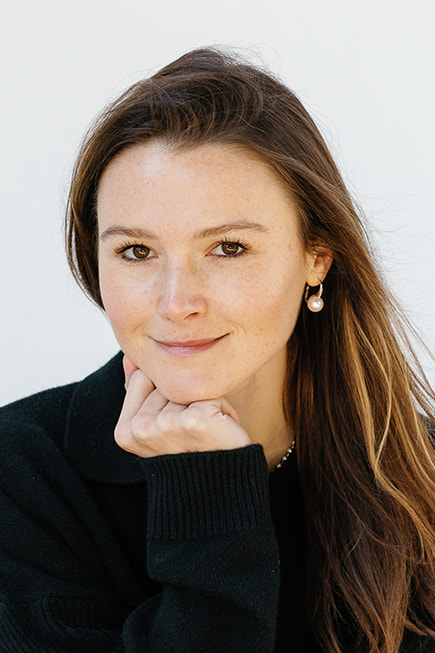
- Atherton in 2022
- Born: 9 February 1991 (age 35); Hong Kong
- Occupation: Venture capitalist
- Employer: Patron
- Board member of: GBx Global

Amber Atherton is a venture capitalist and entrepreneur. A partner at venture capital firm Patron, Atherton was born in Hong Kong circa 1991, before moving to the United Kingdom. In her youth, she started an online jewelry marketplace called My Flash Trash that she later sold, and other businesses. In 2011, she co-starred on the show Made in Chelsea and was featured in 19 episodes over the first three seasons. She started social media marketing business Zyper, which was later acqui-hired by Discord, before joining Patron.

== Early life ==
Amber Atherton was born in Hong Kong circa 1991. According to Atherton, her father was a pilot for Cathay Pacific and her parents encouraged her to be entrepreneurial early on. She started learning how to code when she was ten years-old. Atherton started selling books and CD ROMs on the internet as a child and did modeling as a teenager. She attended Benenden School, a private boarding school in Kent, England, where in 2021 she launched an annual entrepreneurship award for students.

== Career ==
In high school, Amber Atherton started a blog where she posted photos of her and her friends with jewelry. This led to the founding of an online jewelry marketplace called My Flash Trash in 2007, when she was 16. According to Atherton, initially she was using the website to re-sell jewelry she bought on trips back to Hong Kong. Atherton spent two years at the London College of Fashion. She interned for Vogue and Hermès, but left before earning a degree.

In 2011, Atherton played one of the main roles in the first season of the TV show Made in Chelsea. Atherton was a co-creator of the show and was involved in casting decisions as well. The My Flash Trash business grew after the princess of Wales, Kate Middleton, bought seven pieces of jewelry from the site in 2012 and wore them on the royal tour. Atherton worked with angel investors and partnered with a factory in China. In 2016, she sold My Flash Trash to the manufacturer for about £2 million. Atherton also started her own line of accessories that are sold in boutique fashion stores in London and served as one of the judges in a TV show called Pocket Money Pitch.

After selling My Flash Trash, Atherton founded Zyper, initially through an incubator program called Y Combinator. Zyper was focused on facilitating advertising through fans of a product. Atherton moved the startup from London to the United States in 2017. She raised £750,000 in funding in 2017 and £2 million in 2018. In 2021, the Zyper team was acqui-hired by Discord, where Atherton joined as Head of Strategic Communities. She subsequently worked at Discord as Head of Strategic Communities.

In 2021, Atherton created an entrepreneurial award called The Atherton Award that is awarded to young girls for entrepreneurship. She also published a book called The Rise of Virtual Communities and serves on the board of GBx Global, a Silicon Valley community of entrepreneurs from England. Atherton currently serves as a partner of the venture capital firm Patron. She has invested in more than 35 startups as of 2024.
