= Made in Chelsea series 23 =

Made in Chelsea
- Series 23
- No. of episodes: 10

Release
- Original network: E4
- Original release: 4 April – 6 June 2022

Series chronology
- ← Previous; Series 22

The twenty-third series of Made in Chelsea, a British structured-reality television programme began airing on 4 April 2022, and concluded after ten episodes on 6 June 2022. For the first time since 2016, episodes due to air the following week were uploaded to All4.

The series included new cast member Joel Mignott, who joined as the boyfriend of already established cast member Robbie. The series also featured returns for Emma Walsh and Tabitha Willett, as well as Melissa Tattam making a one-off return appearance during the first episode. Following their departures, long term cast members Sam Thompson and Sophie Hermann did not feature in this series. This series heavily focused on Maeva seeking a marriage proposal from James, the end of the line for Emily and Harvey's relationship following a cheating scandal, a love triangle between Inga, Verity and Sam, as well as a turbulent romance between Digby and recent returnee Emma.

== Cast ==
- Digby Edgley
- Emma Walsh
- Emily Blackwell
- Fredrik Ferrier
- Gareth Locke-Locke
- Harvey Armstrong
- Inga Valentiner
- James Taylor
- Joel Mignott
- Julius Cowdrey
- Maeva D'Ascanio
- Mark-Francis Vandelli
- Melissa Tattam
- Miles Nazaire
- Olivia Bentley
- Ollie Locke-Locke
- Paris Smith
- Reza Amiri-Garroussi
- Robbie Mullett
- Ruby Adler
- Sam Prince
- Sophie “Habbs” Habboo
- Tabitha Willett
- Tiff Watson
- Tristan Phipps
- Verity Scarlett Bowditch
- Victoria Baker-Harber

== Episodes ==
No. overall	No. in season	Title	Original release date	Duration	UK viewers
273	1	"She’s Like A Snake In Sheep’s Clothing"	4 April 2022	60 minutes	TBA
As Ruby gets back together with Reza, she feels some of her friends aren’t supportive as they should be. Maeva questions her future with James following Habbs’ engagement announcement, and Ollie and Gareth refuse to give up on their dreams regarding surrogacy. Elsewhere Victoria opens up about her partner facing incarceration, James maps out a timeline for Maeva, and Ruby cuts ties with Julius in order to focus on her relationship with Reza. Verity and Inga come to blows over Sam, and Maeva hatches a plan to get what she wants.
274	2	"I’m Back"	11 April 2022	60 minutes	TBA
Digby introduces his new girlfriend to the group, unaware she’s already got a chequered past with Ollie. Maeva fears that Sam could be a bad influence on James during their boys night out, meanwhile Verity attempts to play Cupid with Tabitha and Julius. Digby’s friendship with Ollie is under immense strain when him and Emma fail to see eye to eye, a spark is reignited between Verity and Miles, and Robbie opens up about his first same-sex relationship. Tristan notices Emma may not be as genuine as she seems, and Maeva lashes out at Sam.
275	3	"Fashion Is Repulsive"	18 April 2022	60 minutes	TBA
Tristan warns Verity against Miles when he learns that the pair are planning a date together. Reza drops a bomb on Digby regarding Emma’s secret messages, and Inga forces Sam and Maeva into clearing the air. Julius is open to Tabitha about not wanting to rush into a serious relationship, but their couple agree to go on a third date anyway. Miles confronts Tristan for attempting to cause a wedge between him and Verity ahead of their date, and Digby asks Emma to be his girlfriend. Elsewhere Tiff shares her miscarriage story with Olivia.
276	4	"The Truth Always Comes Out"	25 April 2022	60 minutes	TBA
Maeva is gobsmacked to hear about Verity and Miles’ new blossoming romance. As Tabitha looks to the future with Julius, she’s disgusted to find out she’s not the only girl he’s been hooking up with. Harvey is in the dog house when a picture of him and another girl surfaces, and Emily desperately tries to get to the bottom of it. Tabitha cuts ties with Julius following his betrayal, Maeva issues Miles with a warning about Verity, and Ruby puts her relationship on the line when she tells Emily that Harvey has admitted the truth about his infidelity to Tristan and Reza.
277	5	"I’ll Literally Regret It Forever"	2 May 2022	60 minutes	TBA
Harvey is full of regret; meanwhile Gareth feels that it was Tristan and Reza’s fault for leading him astray. Verity is livid when she discovers that Ruby has been badmouthing her to Miles, and Sam realises him and Inga aren’t on the same page regarding their relationship. Maeva sets the wheels in motion for her grand proposal to James, whilst Tristan confronts Gareth, and Emily shuts down all hope that Harvey has of reconciling. Olivia twists the knife following an argument with Inga by revealing Sam’s thoughts on being suffocated by her, and Verity goes head-to-head with Ruby.
278	6	"Let’s Give It Another Go"	9 May 2022	60 minutes	TBA
Maeva is touched by Miles’ emotional reaction to the news of her upcoming proposal to James. Emma wants answers from Digby following weeks of silence, whilst Ollie fails to mediate a civilised conversation between Olivia and Inga. Miles is forced into a life changing choice before giving Maeva his blessing to move forward with James. Inga abruptly ends her relationship with Sam when she discovers he’s been cosy with Verity again, and Maeva’s world is turned upside down after James rejects her marriage proposal.
279	7	"Is There No Decorum Anymore?"	16 May 2022	60 minutes	TBA
It’s the morning after the night before and Maeva and James each have different feelings regarding the proposal and Miles’ involvement. Digby comes to a realisation that he still holds a torch for Emma, but is concerned by Tristan’s sudden interference. Inga assures Verity that she’s no longer bothered by her or Sam, whilst Olivia questions whether there’s underlying sexual chemistry between Emily and Miles. Elsewhere Maeva seeks much needed advice from her father, and James meets with Miles for answers.
280	8	"Silence Speaks Volumes"	23 May 2022	60 minutes	TBA
Another cheating scandal rocks Chelsea - but this time it’s James in the firing line and Maeva isn’t sure what to believe. Tristan and Julius declare war on each other as they compete for who has Digby’s best intentions. With no recollection of the night in question, James discovers from the boys just how badly he’s messed up. Inga sees red when a kiss from Olivia and Sam comes to light, Emily and Miles discuss a potential fling, and Digby has some harsh words for Tristan. Elsewhere Maeva breaks down after learning the true extent to James’ betrayal.
281	9	"This Is His Worst Nightmare"	30 May 2022	60 minutes	TBA
Reza and Tristan believe James is using an engagement ring as a trump card to win Maeva back, whilst Sam attempts to cut Olivia out of his life in order to focus on a relationship with Inga. Harvey is uneasy by Miles and Emily getting closer, and Julius successfully brings peace between Inga and Verity again. Maeva is upset to discover the boys haven’t been supportive with rebuilding her relationship with James, and Verity and Inga team up against Sam. Elsewhere Paris agrees to start fresh with Cillian, and Tabitha has her eye on Harvey.
282	10	"Why Be Kind When You Can Be A Bitch?"	6 June 2022	60 minutes	TBA
Digby is in hot water when Emma questions his loyalties to her. An angry Sam confronts Julius for meddling with his relationship with Inga, and Emily tells Harvey that her dates with Miles have nothing to do with him anymore. Elsewhere Ruby comes under fire when Reza accuses her of cheating, and Maeva and James escape Chelsea for a romantic trip around Europe. Ruby fears Reza’s lack of trust for her could signal the end of their relationship, whilst Sam desperately apologises to Olivia for cutting her out, and Digby has a decision to make regarding Emma.

== Ratings ==
Due to BARB now only releasing figures for the 50 most-watched weekly programmes, there are no official ratings for this series.

Episode	Date	Total E4 viewers	Total E4 weekly rank
Episode 1	4 April 2022	N/A	N/A
Episode 2	11 April 2022	N/A	N/A
Episode 3	18 April 2022	N/A	N/A
Episode 4	25 April 2022	N/A	N/A
Episode 5	2 May 2022	N/A	N/A
Episode 6	9 May 2022	N/A	N/A
Episode 7	16 May 2022	N/A	N/A
Episode 8	23 May 2022	N/A	N/A
Episode 9	30 May 2022	N/A	N/A
Episode 10	6 June 2022	N/A	N/A
Average		N/A	N/A
