= Made in Chelsea series 19 =

Made in Chelsea
- Series 19
- No. of episodes: 6

Release
- Original network: E4
- Original release: 23 March – 27 April 2020

Series chronology
- ← Previous; Buenos Aires Next → Series 20

The nineteenth series of Made in Chelsea, a British structured-reality television programme began airing on 23 March 2020, and after being cut short due to the COVID-19 pandemic, concluded on 27 April 2020 following six episodes. Ahead of the series it was announced that original cast members Ollie Locke and Alexandra "Binky" Felstead would be returning to the series. Tiff Watson, Gareth Lock and Jane Felstead also returned to the show. Cast members James Taylor and Maeva D’Ascanio did not feature in this series after it was confirmed they would be taking a break from the show.

The series focused on the relationship troubles of Sam and Zara following the return of Sam's ex-girlfriend Tiff, as well as the feud between Olivia and Melissa. It also included Habbs struggling to come to terms with her best friend Emily dating her ex-boyfriend Harvey, and Ollie and Gareth plan their dream wedding.

== Cast ==
- Alex Mytton
- Alexandra "Binky" Felstead
- Amelia Mist
- Emily Blackwell
- Freddie Browne
- Fredrik Ferrier
- Gareth Locke
- Harry Baron
- Harvey Armstrong
- Jamie Laing
- Jane Felstead
- Louise Thompson
- Mark-Francis Vandelli
- Melissa Tattam
- Miles Nazaire
- Olivia Bentley
- Ollie Locke
- Reza Amiri-Garroussi
- Rosi Mai Waldon
- Sam Holmes
- Sam Thompson
- Sophie “Habbs” Habboo
- Sophie Hermann
- Tiff Watson
- Tristan Phipps
- Verity Scarlett Bowditch
- Victoria Baker-Harber
- Zara McDermott

== Episodes ==
| No. overall | No. in season | Title | Original release date | Duration | UK viewers |
|---|---|---|---|---|---|
| 231 | 1 | "I Need My Binky Back" | 23 March 2020 | 60 minutes | 907,000 |
Sam is taken aback by the speed in which Zara believes their relationship is going. Verity is torn over spending time with her boyfriend Tristan and her best friend Amelia, whilst Habbs and Jamie look for a house together. Miles and Emily's flirting doesn't go unnoticed by the girls, but it's Harvey who ends up admitting he fancies her. Binky migrates herself back into the group with the help of Ollie, and Zara is shocked to hear that her and Sam aren't on the same page. Amelia seeks solace when the situation with Verity and Tristan gets too intense for her, and Habbs lashes out at Harvey.
| 232 | 2 | "I Like Playing In The Danger Zone" | 30 March 2020 | 60 minutes | 865,000 |
Emily is unsure about whether to pursue things with Harvey due to the past he has with Habbs, whilst Olivia isn't happy that Melissa meddled in Sam and Zara's relationship. Miles and Beth grow closer, but his Dad feels that his heart isn't fully in it. Ollie worries about his future with Gareth when Binky questions if they want children. Habbs finally gives Harvey and Emily the green light, Miles puts his foot in it with Beth, and Reza tries to get Melissa and Olivia talking again. Jamie offers Harvey some words of wisdom. Elsewhere tempers flare between Olivia and Melissa.
| 233 | 3 | "I Don't Care If It's My Battle Or Not" | 6 April 2020 | 60 minutes | 823,000 |
Habbs goes back on her word and questions Emily's loyalties as she goes on a date with Harvey. Sophie attempts to get Ollie and Gareth into good shape for their wedding, and Sam opens up to Zara over their future together. Verity and Tristan hit a bump in the road when they fail to understand each other's point of view, Jamie lays into Emily, and Harvey continues to drive a wedge between Habbs and Emily. After seeing how upset his girlfriend is, Jamie has no choice but to confront Harvey over his actions. Elsewhere Sam spends time with Zara's parents.
| 234 | 4 | "If You're Secure In Your Relationship, It Shouldn't Be An Issue" | 13 April 2020 | 60 minutes | 769,000 |
Emily feels isolated from the group leaving her no choice but to attempt to reach out to Habbs. Ollie addresses a spark between Fred and Sophie, and Olivia agrees to go on a date with a woman. Miles seeks Sam's approval after matching with his ex-girlfriend Tiff on a dating app, whilst Harvey and Emily finally give into temptation by sharing a kiss. Melissa offers Tiff some advice before her date with Miles, meanwhile Zara breaks down over the thought of another of Sam's exes being back in his life. Sophie makes the decision to cut Emily out of her life altogether, and moves in with Jamie.
| 235 | 5 | "99% Of The Population Will Understand What I'm Saying" | 20 April 2020 | 60 minutes | 838,000 |
Sam desperately tries to reassure Zara that she has nothing to worry about regarding Tiff being back in their lives. Habbs fears that her feud with Emily has distracted her from working on her relationship with Jamie, and Miles and Tiff agree that they'll be nothing more than friends with benefits. Zara feels increasingly uncomfortable when she realises how highly Sam still thinks of Tiff, whilst James and Verity's mothers meet for the first time. Jamie has a huge gesture for Habbs, and Ollie has a catch-up with Binky about his wedding plans.
| 236 | 6 | "She Doesn't Trust Him To Be Around Me" | 27 April 2020 | 60 minutes | 807,000 |
Harvey confides in the boys about wanting to ask Emily to be his girlfriend, whilst Sam downplays his catch-up with Tiff to Zara. Miles encourages Emily to take the plunge with Harvey. Zara sees red when she hears that Tiff has invited Sam for drinks with her Dad. Emily and Harvey reach a compromise and agree to become exclusive, and Tiff tries to reach out to Zara in order to put an end to the awkwardness between them. Verity and Tristan spice up their sex life, and Tiff revels in telling a distressed Zara about her night out with Sam, causing a wedge in their relationship.

== Ratings ==
Catch-up service totals were added to the official ratings.

| Episode | Date | Total E4 viewers | Total E4 weekly rank |
|---|---|---|---|
| Episode 1 | 23 March 2020 | 907,000 | 8 |
| Episode 2 | 30 March 2020 | 865,000 | 7 |
| Episode 3 | 6 April 2020 | 823,000 | 5 |
| Episode 4 | 13 April 2020 | 769,000 | 4 |
| Episode 5 | 20 April 2020 | 838,000 | 4 |
| Episode 6 | 27 April 2020 | 807,000 | 3 |
| Average | | 835,000 | 5 |
