= Made in Chelsea: South of France =

- No. of episodes: 6

Release
- Original network: E4
- Original release: 1 August – 5 September 2016

Series chronology
- ← Previous; Series 11 Next → Series 12

Made in Chelsea: South of France, a spin-off series of Made in Chelsea, a British structured-reality television programme, was confirmed on 8 June 2016, and began airing on 1 August 2016. and concluded after six episodes on 5 September 2016. It was announced that the cast of Made in Chelsea would be travelling to Cannes to film a special series of the show. It was revealed that this would be a stand-alone series which would not be promoted as the twelfth series. The twelfth series followed in October 2016. This is the third spin-off show filmed away from Chelsea following NYC in 2014 and LA in 2015. The series featured the return of former cast member Francis Boulle. Whilst most of the Chelsea cast featured in this spin-off, there was notable absences from Josh "JP" Patterson and Rosie Fortescue. It is the only series to include French cast member Lukas Avalon, the last to include Louise's ex-boyfriend Alik Alfus, and first to include her new boyfriend Ryan Libbey.

The series focused heavily on the love triangle between Francis, Olivia and Toff before he finally chooses to be with Olivia causing bitterness for Toff, as well as both Jess and Ollie finding holiday romances. It also included the demise of Alex and Jamie's long-term friendship as Jamie chose to believe Frankie over Alex following multiple revelations.

== Cast ==
- Alexandra "Binky" Felstead
- Alex Mytton
- Alik Alfus
- Francis Boulle
- Frankie Gaff
- Georgia "Toff" Toffolo
- Jamie Laing
- Jess Woodley
- Louise Thompson
- Lukas Avalon
- Mark-Francis Vandelli
- Matt Draper
- Olivia Bentley
- Ollie Locke
- Ryan Libbey
- Sam Thompson
- Stephanie Pratt
- Tiff Watson
- Victoria Baker-Harber

== Episodes ==
No. overall	No. in season	Title	Original release date	Duration	UK viewers
130	1	"I’m Going To Wear Bikini And Heels, ‘Cos I’m On A Yacht And I’m In The South Of France"	1 August 2016	60 minutes	738,000
The gang arrive in Cannes where Olivia sets her sights on a summer romance, Binky signs Ollie up to a dating sight hoping to find him a French boyfriend, and the boys receive a surprise when they find Francis on the beach. Elsewhere Stephanie and Tiff agree to be civil to each other for the sake of the group, and Louise discusses her woes about Alik to new guy Lukas. At the yacht party Francis asks Olivia out on a date, whilst Jamie is thrown when Frankie arrives to surprise him unaware that Alex has accidentally let slip that he’s been allowing other girls to stay in his bed.
131	2	"Do You Remember It, Or Did You Blackout?"	8 August 2016	60 minutes	627,000
Alex ends his relationship with Nicola by text before jumping into bed with Olivia, and Toff is smitten as she wakes up next to Francis. Jamie rages with Sam after details of their private conversation are spread around the group, and Louise is baffled when Stephanie continues to drag up the past. Meanwhile the girls feel Frankie is being mugged off until she reveals that Alex has tried it on with her. Toff is left heartbroken when Francis takes Olivia out on a date, Binky attempts to learn French, and Jamie is torn when he hears the difficult truth about Alex and Frankie.
132	3	"I Did Not Have Sexual Relations With That Woman"	15 August 2016	60 minutes	664,000
Despite agreeing to continue going on dates with Olivia, Francis hooks up with Toff again leaving him confused over which girl is right for him. Ollie takes Yacine fishing for their successful first date, whilst Frankie has some explaining to do to Jamie, and Alex returns home to Chelsea after feeling isolated by the group. Louise’s new boyfriend arrives from London, and Francis agrees to keep things exclusive with Toff before offering to take Olivia out on another date. Frankie and Jamie attempt to work through their troubles.
133	4	"I Want My Girl Back"	22 August 2016	60 minutes	758,000
As Louise packs Ryan off home, reality hits her as she frantically prepares to come face-to-face with Alik who has every intention to win her back. Francis fears that Toff is getting too attached before finally deciding he wants to be with Olivia. Sam realises Alik is in denial over Louise so demands his sister be completely honest with him, causing him to lash out. Elsewhere Ollie faces disappointment when his new love interest ends their brief fling, and Francis breaks some tough news to Toff about his real feelings, who then angrily confronts Olivia over girl code.
134	5	"I Always Wear My Kaftan In Monaco"	29 August 2016	60 minutes	913,000
Tiff is far from impressed when she hears that Sam still wants to live a bachelor life leaving her questioning their relationship, whilst Olivia is given a dilemma after hearing that Frankie has given her number to another guy. Jamie faces fresh turmoil when Alex tells him that Frankie has been telling him she likes him instead, but will he believe his best friend or his girlfriend? Elsewhere Francis and Olivia receive the backlash from their blossoming romance, and further damning evidence against Frankie puts her in an awkward situation with Jamie.
135	6	"Au Revoir Francois"	5 September 2016	60 minutes	907,000
Sam feels the pressure as his and Tiff’s parents fly out to meet each other for the first time. Frankie gives Jamie an ultimatum over her situation with Alex, telling him if he believes his best friend over her she will leave him. Just as she’s beginning to enjoy single life, Binky is thrown when she receives messaged from JP. Alex hosts a party before the group return home but is left disappointed when Jamie doesn’t show up having been banned by Frankie, and Olivia and Toff finally settle their differences. After isolating Jamie from his friends, Frankie feels she is one nil up on Alex.

== Ratings ==
Episode	Date	Official E4 rating	E4 weekly rank
Episode 1	1 August 2016	738,000	6
Episode 2	8 August 2016	627,000	6
Episode 3	15 August 2016	664,000	6
Episode 4	22 August 2016	758,000	6
Episode 5	29 August 2016	913,000	1
Episode 6	5 September 2016	907,000	4
Average		768,000	5
