= Louise Thompson (TV personality) =

British reality television personality (born 1990)

- Born: Louise Anne de Courcy Thompson; 26 March 1990 (age 36)
- Education: Downe House
- Alma mater: University of Edinburgh
- Occupations: TV Personality; Actress; Co-Founder of Pocket Sport
- Partner: Ryan Libbey
- Children: 1
- Relatives: Sam Thompson (brother)

Louise Anne de Courcy Thompson (born 26 March 1990) is a British reality television personality who appeared in the E4 reality series Made in Chelsea. . Louise has a strong social media presence, where she shares insights on fitness, health, and motherhood, making her a well-known figure in the wellness and lifestyle industry. She is the author of multiple books, including the Sunday Times number one bestseller Lucky, and is widely recognised for her honest and impactful writing on birth trauma, recovery, and women’s health. Drawing on her own lived experience, her work has helped raise awareness and drive conversations around improving maternity care in the UK.

== Education ==
Thompson attended Downe House, before moving on to study geography at the University of Edinburgh, graduating in 2013.

== Career ==
Louise Thompson is a British television personality, author, entrepreneur, and maternal health advocate. She rose to prominence in 2011 as a cast member on the E4 reality series Made in Chelsea, appearing as a regular from its second series. She remained on the programme for over a decade, featuring across more than 20 series until 2022, becoming one of its longest-serving cast members.

She later expanded her television career by competing in the second series of The Jump in 2014, where she reached the final.

Alongside her media career, Thompson has developed a business portfolio spanning fashion and wellness. In 2012, she co-founded the fashion brand Pocket London, initially focused on denim before transitioning into activewear in 2017. She has also collaborated on fashion projects, including a petite clothing collection with Nobody’s Child, aimed at increasing accessibility within contemporary womenswear. In the accessories market, she partnered with Carrie Elizabeth to create a series of curated jewellery collections.

In the health and wellness space, Thompson founded the platform Live Like Louise, offering fitness programmes and lifestyle guidance. She published her first book, Live Well with Louise, in 2018, focusing on nutrition, fitness, and balanced living. Her second book, Lucky, became a Sunday Times number one bestseller and received industry recognition, including Audible awards for its audiobook edition. The memoir documents her experience of severe birth trauma and its aftermath, exploring themes of physical recovery, mental health, and early motherhood.

In addition to her books, Thompson is a writer and columnist. She previously wrote a column for You magazine, where her candid, first-person pieces on relationships, health, and modern life gained a wide readership. She also publishes a Substack newsletter, Louise Loves, where she shares essays and personal reflections. She has collaborated with The Head Plan on a series of guided journals focused on mental wellbeing and self-reflection. She maintains an active presence on social media platforms, where she documents aspects of her personal life, health journey, and professional work.

Thompson is also a podcast host. She co-hosts He Said, She Said with her partner Ryan Libbey, produced by Staying Relevant Productions. The podcast centres on relationships and personal experiences, combining candid discussion with humour.

Following life-threatening complications during the birth of her son in 2021, Thompson became an advocate for maternal health and birth trauma awareness. She has worked with organisations including the Birth Trauma Association, and serves as a patron of both the Birth Trauma Association and Crohn’s & Colitis UK. She has used her platform to highlight systemic issues in maternity care and chronic illness.

In 2026, Thompson partnered with Theo Clarke to launch a parliamentary petition calling for the appointment of an independent Maternity Commissioner to oversee maternity services in the United Kingdom. The campaign gained significant public support, surpassing 150,000 signatures and prompting parliamentary debate on maternity care and accountability.

Her advocacy has established her as a prominent public voice on maternity care in the UK, campaigning for improved safety standards, greater accountability, and increased support for women affected by traumatic births.

== Personal life ==
Thompson is engaged to Ryan Libbey. The couple have one son, born in 2021. Her experience of a traumatic birth and its long-term impact has been widely documented and has informed both her writing and advocacy work.

In 2018, Thompson was diagnosed with ulcerative colitis. She has faced health challenges since late 2021, following the birth of her child. After being hospitalized for 14 days, she was diagnosed with post-traumatic stress and lupus diagnosis. She suffered a haemorrhage and lost three litres of blood and was rushed back to hospital twice in 2024.

== Filmography ==
Year	Title	Role	Note
2011–2020	Made in Chelsea	Herself	Cast member
2015	The Jump	Herself	Series 2 - Fourth
2024	Celebrity Deal or No Deal (British game show)	Contestant	Non-player

== Books ==
- Thompson, Louise (8 January 2019). Live Well With Louise: Fitness & Food to Feel Strong & Happy. Hodder. ISBN 978-1-4736-7735-7.
- Thompson, Louise (2024). Lucky: Learning to live again. Ebury Spotlight. ISBN 978-1-5299-2376-6. Sunday Times number one bestseller; recipient of Audible awards for its audiobook edition
- Guided journals (in collaboration with The Head Plan)
