= Made in Chelsea =

British television series

- Genre: Reality television
- Opening theme: "Punching in a Dream" by The Naked and Famous (series 1); "Midnight City" by M83 (series 2, 4–present); "New France" by Orbital (series 3)
- Country of origin: United Kingdom
- Original language: English
- No. of series: 31 (plus 11 spin-offs)
- No. of episodes: 382 (list of episodes)

Production
- Executive producers: Sarah Dillistone; David Granger; Kelly Lynn
- Production location: Chelsea, London
- Running time: 45–70 minutes
- Production company: Monkey Kingdom

Original release
- Network: E4
- Release: 9 May 2011 – present

Made in Chelsea (MIC) is a British structured-reality television series broadcast by E4. Made in Chelsea chronicles the lives of affluent young people in the West London and South West areas of Belgravia, King's Road, Chelsea, Fulham and Knightsbridge, as well as their travels to other locations around the world.

== Series ==
Year	Series	Number of episodes	Average viewers
2011	Series 1	8	655,000
2011	Series 2	11	598,000
2012	Series 3	10	784,000
2012	Series 4	10	711,000
2013	Series 5	11	897,000
2013	Series 6	11	919,000
2014	Series 7	11	1,138,000
2014	NYC	6	1,022,000
2014	Series 8	11	962,000^{1}
2015	Series 9	11	814,000
2015	LA	6	874,000
2015	Series 10	11	842,000
2016	Series 11	11	891,000
2016	South of France	6	768,000
2016	Series 12	11	768,000
2017	Series 13	11	821,000
2017	Ibiza	6	774,000
2017	Series 14	11	707,000
2018	Series 15	11	772,000
2018	Croatia	6	734,000
2018	Series 16	11	995,000
2019	Series 17	13	708,000
2019	Series 18	11	756,000
2019	Buenos Aires	4	622,000
2020	Series 19	6	835,000
2020	Series 20	12	979,334
2021	Series 21	12	725,000
2021	Series 22	12	699,000
2022	Series 23	10	-
2022	Mallorca	5	-
2022	Series 24	10	-
2022	Bali and Bonjour Baby	5	-
2023	Series 25	11	-
2023	Corsica	5	-
2023	Series 26	10	-
2023	Sydney	5	-
2024	Series 27	10	-
2024	Bondi	10	-
2024	Series 28	10	-
2025	Series 29	10	-
2025	Series 30	10	-
2026	Series 31	10	

^{1}Series 8's average figure for the ten episodes where the viewing figures were available.

=== Series 1 (2011) ===
The first series began airing on 9 May 2011 on E4. The series concluded on 27 June 2011 after eight episodes. The show was first announced in April 2011 and was described as a "fly-on-the-wall-drama". Filming for the series took place between January and May 2011, with the first full-length trailer airing 28 April 2011. This series includes Spencer Matthews and Funda's turbulent relationship coming to an end after Spencer's childhood sweetheart Caggie comes back into his life; Hugo Taylor being torn between two women, Millie Mackintosh and Rosie Fortescue; and best friends Francis and Fredrik both realizing they have fallen for the same girl. It also features the breakdown of Ollie and Gabriella's relationship as he eventually has the courage to come out as bisexual. The DVD for the series was released on 19 September 2011 and features all eight episodes.

=== Series 2 (2011) ===
The second series began airing on 19 September 2011 on E4. The series concluded on 21 November 2011 after 10 episodes; however, an end-of-season party episode aired on 28 November 2011, which was hosted by Rick Edwards and featured the cast members reuniting to discuss the series. Filming for the series began on 29 July 2011. This series featured the arrival of several new cast members including Alice Davidson, Chloe Green, Jamie Laing, Oliver Proudlock and Victoria Baker-Harber as well as the reintroduction of Louise Thompson, the ex-girlfriend of Spencer Matthews who briefly appeared during the first series. On 22 December 2011, the show's first Christmas special aired. The series included a rift forming between Binky and Cheska as they are forced to pick sides with Gabriella and Ollie, Spencer breaking off his brief fling with Louise to chase after Caggie again, and the breakdown of Hugo and Millie's relationship when it is announced that both have cheated on each other, leading up to Millie exposing Hugo's night with Rosie to a room full of guests.

=== Series 3 (2012) ===
The third series began airing on 2 April 2012 on E4. The series concluded on 4 June 2012 after 10 episodes, however an end of season party episode aired on 11 June 2012 which was hosted by Rick Edwards and featured the cast members reuniting to discuss everything from the series. The series was confirmed on 21 November 2011 following the second series finale. This was the last series to feature original cast members Amber Atherton, Caggie Dunlop and Hugo Taylor, but also saw the introduction of new cast members Kimberley Garner, Natalie Joel and Richard Dinan. The series included a relationship blossoming between Kimberley and Richard until some interference from Cheska led to the discovery that she was living a double life. It also features a love triangle between Spencer, Jamie and Louise causing a drift between best friends, and Millie and Rosie finally rebuilding their friendship.

=== Series 4 (2012) ===
The fourth series began airing on 15 October 2012 on E4. The series concluded on 17 December 2012 after 10 episodes, however a 60-minute Christmas special episode aired immediately after the series on 24 December 2012, which was then followed by an end of season special presented by Rick Edwards on 31 December 2012 featuring a reunion of the cast to discuss events from the series. The series saw the arrival of several new cast members including Andy Jordan, Ashley James, Carly Rothman, Sam Cussins, Sophia Sassoon, Stevie Johnson and Lucy Watson, well as the departure of original cast members Fredrik Ferrier and Gabriella Ellis. This series also featured the long triangle between Sophia, Francis and Proudlock, the rivalry between Millie and Victoria increasing, the brief reconnection between Gabriella and Ollie, and the rocky relationship between Spencer and Louise until the revelation that he cheated on her.

=== Series 5 (2013) ===
The fifth series began airing on 8 April 2013 on E4. The series concluded on 17 June 2013 after 11 episodes, however an end of season party episode aired on 24 June 2013 which was hosted by Rick Edwards and featured the cast members reuniting to discuss everything from the series. This was the first series to include new cast members Fran and Olivia Newman-Young, Phoebe Lettice-Thompson and Alex Mytton. It was the only series to feature Josh Acoombs and Oscar Ligenza, and the series saw the departures of original cast members Ollie Locke and Millie Mackintosh as well as Richard Dinan and Ashley James. The series included the end of Spencer and Louise's relationship after the revelation that Spencer cheated, then both of their attempts to move on as Louise begins a new romance with Andy, and Spencer tries his luck with Lucy. It also featured Ashley struggling to come to terms with Ollie's sexuality, Jamie realising he has feelings for Phoebe despite being in a relationship with Tara, and Francis and Proudlock once again competing for the same girl.

=== Series 6 (2013) ===
The sixth series began airing on 14 October 2013 on E4. The series concluded on 16 December 2013 after 10 episodes, however a Christmas special episode aired immediately after the series on 23 December 2013, which was then followed by an end of season special presented by Rick Edwards on 30 December 2013 featuring a reunion of the cast to discuss events from the series. This was the first series to feature new cast members Sam Thompson, Sophie Hermann and Stephanie Pratt, and was the final series to feature Olivia Newman-Young, Phoebe-Lettice Thompson, and original cast member Francis Boulle. The series featured the love blossoming between Jamie and Lucy despite obstacles in the form of Spencer and Phoebe, the breakdown of Andy and Louise's relationship as many secrets are revealed, the rivalry between friends Fran and Phoebe as Phoebe discovers Fran has made a pass at her ex-boyfriend, and the start of the relationship for Alex and Binky.

=== Series 7 (2014) ===
The seventh series began airing on 7 April 2014 on E4. The series concluded on 16 June 2014 after 11 episodes. This is notably the only series since series 2 where it wasn't followed by an End of Season reunion show. It is the first to feature new cast members Riley Uggla and Georgia "Toff" Toffolo and the only series to include Riley's friend, Aurelie Mason-Perez and Ed "Fordy" Ford. The series included the rocky relationship between Alex and Binky after a number of revelations about Alex came to light, the isolation of Binky in her friendship group as none of them supported her decision to stay with Alex, a love triangle between Jamie, Lucy and Riley before Jamie realises he still has feelings for Lucy from their previous relationship with each other, and the brief romance between Stephanie and Stevie.

=== NYC (2014) ===
A spin off series entitled Made in Chelsea: NYC began airing on 10 August 2014 on E4. The series concluded on 14 September 2014 after 6 episodes. It was announced on 18 March 2014 that the cast of Made in Chelsea would be traveling to New York City to film a special series of the show. Despite the series featuring all of the Chelsea cast, there were notable absences from Andy Jordan, Georgia "Toff" Toffolo and Sophie Hermann. A number of American cast members were introduced during this series including Alik Alfus, Billie Carroll and Jules Hamilton. It also included to brief return of original cast member Gabriella Ellis, who originally featured in the show from series one to four. Alik was the only one who remained as a cast member after this series. This series was also the last to feature original cast member Cheska Hull as well as Riley Uggla. The spin-off series included the love blossoming between Alik and Louise, the competition between Spencer and Stevie for Billie before Stevie's ex-girlfriend Stephanie arrives, Alex attempting to make amends with people then leaving with more enemies than friends, and the revelation that Lucy and Proudlock have been hooking up. It was revealed that this would be a stand-alone series which would not be promoted as the eighth series. The eighth series in fact followed in October 2014.

=== Series 8 (2014) ===
The eighth series began airing on 13 October 2014 on E4. The series concluded on 15 December 2014 after 10 episodes. A Christmas special episode aired immediately after the series on 22 December 2014, followed by an end of season special presented by Rick Edwards on 29 December 2014. This is the first series to feature new main cast members Josh Shepherd, Lauren Frazer-Hutton, Tiff Watson and Lonan O'Herlihy, and was the only series to include cast members George Amor and Will Colebrook after they did not return for the ninth series. Lauren was introduced as the new girlfriend of already established cast member Spencer Matthews, whilst Tiffany is the sister of Lucy Watson. The series focused on Spencer and Laurens relationship, an ongoing argument between Binky and Fran, the romance between Alik and Louise, and Sam attempting to win back Tiffany following several cheating allegations.

=== Series 9 (2015) ===
The ninth series began airing on 13 April 2015 on E4. This series also featured the show's 100th episode; broadcast on 15 June 2015. This series was the first series to include new cast members Emily Weller, Jess Woodley, Millie Wilkinson, Fleur Irving, Josh "JP" Patterson, Nicola Hughes, James Dunmore and Elliot Cross, and the last to include long running cast members Andy Jordan Stevie Johnson, as well as Sophie Hermann, Fran Newman-Young and Lauren Frazer-Hutton. The series focused on blossoming relationships between James and Lucy, Jamie and Jess, a rift forming between Lucy and Stephanie, and Spencer's romance with Lauren hitting the rocks when he turns back to his old ways.

=== LA (2015) ===
A spin off series entitled Made in Chelsea: LA was confirmed on 14 May 2015. It was announced that the cast of Made in Chelsea would be travelling to Los Angeles to film a special series of the show. It was revealed that this would be a stand-alone series which would not be promoted as the tenth series. The tenth series will in fact follow in October 2015. Filming for the spin-off began in late May 2015 and concluded in late-July. This is the second spin-off show filmed in America following the NYC special the previous year. The third episode of this series was filmed in Las Vegas. The six-episode series began on 10 August 2015 on E4. It also featured the brief return of former cast member Gabriella Ellis, as well as the permanent return of Ollie Locke. It was the only series to include American cast members Olivia Fox and Naz Gharai, and the last to include Josh Shepherd. Whilst most of the Chelsea cast featured in this spin-off, there was notable absences from Elliot Cross, Oliver Proudlock, Millie Wilkinson, Nicola Hughes, Rosie Fortescue, Sam Thompson, Spencer Matthews, Tiff Watson and Victoria Baker-Harber. The series included the end of the relationship between Josh and Stephanie, Jamie starting a holiday romance with Naz before eventually realising he actually has feelings for Jess, and Binky opening up to JP about her growing love for him only for him to break things off completely.

=== Series 10 (2015) ===
The tenth series began airing on 19 October 2015 on E4. The official trailer for the new series was released on 29 September 2015 confirming the start date. It concluded on 4 January 2016 following nine regular episodes, a Christmas special, a New Year special, and an End of Season party hosted by Rick Edwards. This series was the first to include new cast members Emma Walsh, Sam Harney, Tallulah Rufus Isaacs. Richard Dinan also returned to the series having last appeared during the fifth series, and Francis Boulle made a one-off return during the Christmas special. This was also the final series to include original cast member Spencer Matthews, long-running cast member Oliver Proudlock, as well as Millie Wilkinson and Emily Weller, who both made their debuts during the ninth series. The series focused heavily on Sam and Tiff's rocky relationship coming to an end when Tiff admits to cheating on him during the summer and rumours of Sam cheating surface, until the pair eventually reunite. It also includes Louise and Alik attempting to make their long-distance relationship work with obstacles in their way, Binky and JP finally making their relationship official despite commitment issues from his part, and Spencer causing further trouble by hooking up with Ollie's latest love interest Emma.

=== Series 11 (2016) ===
The eleventh series was confirmed on 1 March 2016 to begin on 11 April 2016 on E4 and concluded on 27 June 2016 following eleven regular episodes and a "The Aftermath" special hosted by Rick Edwards. This is the first series not to feature original cast member Spencer Matthews following his departure during the previous series, as well as long running cast member Oliver Proudlock. Ahead of the series confirmed that Jessica Dixon and Olivia Bentley had joined the series as new cast members, however Jessica only appeared in four episodes. They were joined by Frankie Gaff and Matt Draper mid-way through the series. This is the final series to feature long-serving cast member Lucy Watson, James Dunmore, Nicola Hughes, Millie Wilkinson and Tallulah Rufus-Isaacs. The series focused heavily on the fallout between Lucy and Stephanie and the consequences it had for the remaining cast, as well blossoming romance between Jamie and Frankie despite cheating allegations. It also featured Sam and Tiff's turbulent relationship hit a number of obstacles, and the breakdown of Binky and JP's relationship.

=== South of France (2016) ===
A spin off series entitled Made in Chelsea: South of France was confirmed on 8 June 2016, and began airing on 1 August 2016. and concluded after six episodes on 5 September 2016. It was announced that the cast of Made in Chelsea would be travelling to Cannes to film a special series. It was revealed that this would be a stand-alone series which would not be promoted as the twelfth series. The twelfth series followed in October 2016. This is the third spin-off show filmed away from Chelsea following NYC in 2014 and LA in 2015. The series featured the return of former cast member Francis Boulle. Whilst most of the Chelsea cast featured in this spin-off, there was notable absences from Josh "JP" Patterson, Richard Dinan and Rosie Fortescue. The series focused heavily on the love triangle between Francis, Olivia and Toff before he finally chooses to be with Olivia causing bitterness for Toff, as both Jess and Ollie finding holiday romances. It also included the demise of Alex and Jamie's long-term friendship as Jamie chose to believe Frankie over Alex following multiple revelations.

=== Series 12 (2016) ===
The twelfth series began airing on 10 October 2016 on E4, and concluded on 26 December 2016 following eleven episodes and a "Christmas Party" special episode hosted by Rick Edwards. This series also featured the return of former cast members Fred Ferrier and Oliver Proudlock having last appeared in the fourth and tenth series respectively. New cast members for this series include Emily Blackwell, Julius Cowdrey and Nick Summerfield, as well as Akin Solanke-Caulker, who is the first black cast member to feature in the show. This is the final series to include Jess Woodley, after announcing her departure in February 2017. This series focused heavily on the divide between the girls as Tiff and Toff's ongoing feud continued, until they eventually made up much to the distress of Toff's best friend Jess. It also included Binky testing the boundaries with her relationship with JP causing a confrontation between her friends as they offer her some tough love. As well as this, the start of Olivia and Fred's new romance is included in this series, the new rivalry between Sam and Julius, and the strain on Louise and Ryan's relationship taking toll.

=== Series 13 (2017) ===
The thirteenth series began on 20 March 2017 on E4 lasting for eleven episodes. Ahead of the series, cast members Binky Felstead and Josh "JP" Patterson announced they were expecting a child. On 14 February 2017 it was announced that Jess Woodley had quit the show having appeared since the ninth series. This was the first series to include new cast members Daisy Robins, Ella Willis, Harry Baron, Mimi Bouchard and Sam Prince. Love Island contestant Tina Stinnes also returned to the series having previously briefly appearing in the seventh series of the show. This was the final series to feature original cast member Alexandra "Binky" Felstead who made an announcement of her departure ahead of the final episode, as well as Josh "JP" Patterson and Ollie Locke, who also announced their departures from the show. This episode also included the one-off return of Francesa "Cheska" Hull as she attended Binky's baby shower. It was also the last series to include cast members Akin Solanke-Caulker, Rosie Fortescue and Stephanie Pratt who did not return for fourteenth series. The series heavily focused on the rift between Jamie and Frankie following a number of obstacles getting in their way, the end of Olivia and Fredrik's relationship when his attention sways elsewhere, and JP and Binky planning their future with the imminent arrival of their baby. It also included Louise and Ryan taking their relationship to the next step, and Julius and Ella facing difficulties whilst trying to earn each other's trust.

=== Ibiza (2017) ===
A spin off series entitled Made in Chelsea: Ibiza was confirmed on 11 April 2017 and began on 31 July 2017. It was announced that the cast of Made in Chelsea would be travelling to Ibiza to film a special series of the show. It was revealed that this would be a stand-alone series which would not be promoted as the fourteenth series. The cast for the series was revealed on 19 July 2017, and only featured some of the Made in Chelsea cast, with notable absences from Francis Boulle, Fredrik Ferrier and Oliver Proudlock.Despite announcing they'd left the show, Alexandra "Binky" Felstead and Josh "JP" Patterson made a brief appearance during the third episode during a video chat with some of the cast. The series focused heavily on the final nail in the coffin for Sam T and Tiff's turbulent relationship following their attempt at taking a break, as well as Jamie and Frankie both realising that they're better off apart. It also included the rivalry between Olivia and Julius escalating, and Sam P betraying Toff one too many times.

=== Series 14 (2017) ===
The fourteenth series began on 9 October 2017 on E4 and concluded on 25 December 2017 following eleven episodes and a "Christmas Ding Dong" special episode hosted by Rick Edwards. This series featured the return of former cast members Sophie Hermann and Alik Alfus, having last appeared in the ninth series and South of France spin-off respectively. This was the only series to include new cast member Charlie Mills. Other new cast members include Digby Edgley, James Taylor, Sophie "Habbs" Habboo and Clementine Cuthbertson. It was the final series to include Daisy Robins, Emily Blackwell, Ella Willis and Julius Cowdrey following their unannounced departures during the series. Tiff Watson also announced that she had left the series and would not return for the fifteenth. The series focused heavily on the aftermath of Jamie and Frankie's break-up as they both try to move on from each other, as well as Olivia's new blossoming romance with Digby, and Louise and Ryan's relationship hitting the rocks following the return of her ex-boyfriend Alik. It also included Tiff and Sam T finally accepting they're better off apart.

=== Series 15 (2018) ===
The fifteenth series began on 12 March 2018 on E4 and concluded on 28 May 2018 following eleven episodes, and an "End of Season Party" special hosted by Ellie Taylor. Ahead of the series it was announced that Tiff Watson had quit the show for good, having previously announced that she'd just be taking a break. New cast members for this series include Melissa Tattam and Miles Nazaire. Stanley Johnson also made his first appearance during this series with Toff following their appearances together in the seventeenth series of I'm a Celebrity...Get Me Out of Here! This was the final series to include cast members Clementine Cuthbertson and Frankie Gaff, who quit the midway through the series. This series heavily focused on the breakups and makeups of Digby and Olivia's troubled relationship, as well as the strain on Louise and Ryan when her ex-boyfriend Alik moves back to London. It also includes Sam T attempting to move on from his last girlfriend, and Harry and Melissa's blossoming romance.

=== Croatia (2018) ===
A spin off series entitled Made in Chelsea: Croatia was confirmed on 21 May 2018. The cast of Made in Chelsea travelled to Croatia to film a special stand-alone summer series which would not be promoted as the sixteenth series. It began airing on 6 August 2018, and concluded after 6 episodes on 10 September 2018. The first trailer for the series was released on 17 July 2018 confirming some of the cast members set to appear. Whilst most of the cast appeared, in the series, it also featured notable absences from Fredrik Ferrier, Oliver Proudlock, Georgia "Toff" Toffolo, Alik Alfus, Mimi Bouchard and James Taylor. The series includes the feud between Harry and Sam T as both throw each other's relationships under the bus. It also includes Tabitha and Miles briefly getting together before it's revealed she's been seeing Sam P back in Chelsea, and the final nail in the coffin for Digby and Olivia's relationship. Following this series it was announced that Sam Prince would not be returning to the show, and that this was his final series.

=== Series 16 (2018) ===
The sixteenth series began airing on 8 October 2018 and concluded on 24 December 2018 following eleven episodes, and a "Big Christmas Quiz" special episode presented by Mollie King and Matt Edmondson. Ahead of the series it was announced that Georgia "Toff" Toffolo, Francis Boulle and Sam Prince would not be returning to the series. Alik Alfus was also absent from the series following his appearance on Celebs Go Dating. Instead, new cast members included Tristan Phipps and Eliza Batten as well as Emily Blackwell, who returned as a regular. Fran Newman-Young, Millie Wilkinson, Mimi Bouchard and Binky Felstead all made a brief one-off return. This series heavily focused on both Olivia and Digby coming to terms with the breakdown of their relationship before an illegitimate kiss with Miles gives them a huge decision to make. It also includes a brief romance for Sam and Habbs, Fred and Sophie revisiting their spark, and Miles continuing to annoy the women in his life. During the series it was announced that original cast member Ollie Locke had quit the show, therefore this was his final series.

=== Series 17 (2019) ===
The seventeenth series airing on 25 March 2019, and concluded on 17 June 2019 following thirteen episodes, making this the longest series to date. Ahead of the series it was announced that Sam Thompson, Louise Thompson, Ryan Libbey, Ollie Locke, Emily Blackwell, Tristan Phipps and Heloise "Ell" Agostinelli had decided to quit the series, and was the first series to include new cast members Amelia Mist, Angus Findlay, Freddie Browne, Hugo Leefe, Maeva D'Ascanio, Ollie Buck, Rosi Mai Waldon, Sammy Allsop and Verity Scarlett Bowditch. This series focused on the tit-for-tat behaviour between exes Miles and Maeva. It also included Amelia and Verity on the quest for love, Jamie and Habbs realising they have fallen for each other before facing a number of difficulties, and the breakdown of Miles and James's friendship following the ultimate betrayal.

=== Series 18 (2019) ===
The eighteenth series began airing on 2 September 2019, and concluded on 11 November 2019 following eleven episodes. For the first time since 2013, a Summer spin-off did not air between the two main series. Instead, one will follow later in the year. New cast members for this series included Reza Amiri-Garroussi and Zara McDermott, who had previously appeared on Love Island. This series also featured the return of former cast members Sam Thompson, Emily Blackwell, Tristan Phipps and Tabitha Willett. This series focused heavily on the beginning of James and Maeva's relationship despite obstacles in the shape of Miles and Verity, as well as Jamie attempting to make amends with former best friend Sam after breaking his trust. It also included Olivia receive some life changing opportunities, and Emily and Verity competing for Tristan.

=== Buenos Aires (2019) ===
A spin off series entitled Made in Chelsea: Buenos Aires was confirmed on 4 November 2019 when it was announced that the cast of Made in Chelsea would be travelling to Buenos Aires, Argentina to film a special version of the show. The series began airing on 9 December 2019. They concluded on 30 December 2019 following four episode and a special "End of Yah Quiz" hosted by Matt Edmondson and Mollie King. This makes this the shortest of the show's "Out of Chelsea" spin-offs. This was the sixth spin-off series of the show, but the first to air outside its usual Summer schedule. Whilst some of the cast appeared in this series, it also featured notable absences from Eliza Batten, Oliver Proudlock and Victoria Baker-Harber. The new cast members to join the show included Harvey Armstrong and Sam Holmes. The series heavily focused on new cast member Harvey coming between close friends Habbs and Olivia, as well as Tristan and James's friendship being tested as their partners Verity and Maeva's feud continues. It also features Sam and Zara face their first lovers tiff.

=== Series 19 (2020) ===
The nineteenth series began on 23 March 2020. They concluded following six episode on 27 April 2020 after being cut short due to the COVID-19 pandemic. Ahead of the series it was announced that original cast members Ollie Locke and Alexandra "Binky" Felstead would be returning to the series. Tiff Watson, Gareth Lock and Jane Felstead also returned to the show. The series focused on the relationship troubles of Sam and Zara following the return of Sam's ex-girlfriend Tiff, as well as the feud between Olivia and Melissa. It also included Habbs struggling to come to terms with her best friend Emily dating her ex-boyfriend Harvey as well as Ollie and Gareth planning their dream wedding.

=== Series 20 (2020) ===
The twentieth series began on 28 September 2020 for twelve episodes. Due to the COVID-19 pandemic, it was announced that the cast would be following government guidelines whilst filming the series. Some of the cast filmed and quarantined together in country houses located in Surrey, whilst others filmed in London; adhering to social distancing rules to protect the cast and crew. New cast members for this series included former Love Island contestant Charlie Frederick, as well as Paris Smith, Ruby Alder and Will Higginson. James Taylor and Maeva D'Ascanio returned to the show following their short break. During the series it was confirmed that Miles Nazaire would not be appearing, but would be returning in the future. The series ended with a special "Made in Chelsea: The Wedding" episode focused on the wedding of Ollie and Gareth, which was brought forward following the announcement of the second national lockdown.

=== Series 21 (2021) ===
The twenty-first series began on 29 March 2021 for twelve episodes. Due to the ongoing COVID-19 pandemic, it was announced that the cast would be forming a "cast bubble" and filming the first portion of the series in one singular location, a sprawling country mansion in the Cotswolds. Miles Nazaire returned to the show, having been absent from the previous series; Julius Cowdrey, who last appeared on the show in the fourteenth series, also returned. New cast members for this series include Tom Zanetti, Inga Valentiner and Robbie Mullett.

=== Series 22 (2021) ===
The twenty-second series began on 11 October 2021 for twelve episodes. Unlike the previous two series, the cast were back in its usual location of Chelsea without having to quarantine together due to the government guidelines and restrictions for the COVID-19 pandemic being dropped in the UK. The series included a couple of new cast members including Nicole Berry and Sarrah Jasmin, as well as the return of former cast Angus Findlay, Digby Edgley and Sam Prince. They replace Alex Mytton who did not return for this series.

=== Series 23 (2022) ===
The twenty-third series began airing on 4 April 2022, and concluded after ten episodes on 6 June 2022. For the first time since 2016, episodes due to air the following week were uploaded to All4. The series included new cast member Joel Mignott, who joined as the boyfriend of already established cast member Robbie. The series also featured returns for Emma Walsh and Tabitha Willett, as well as Melissa Tattam making a one-off return appearance during the first episode. Following their departures, long term cast members Sam Thompson and Sophie Hermann did not feature in this series. This series heavily focused on Maeva seeking a marriage proposal from James, the end of the line for Emily and Harvey's relationship following a cheating scandal, a love triangle between Inga, Verity and Sam, as well as a turbulent romance between Digby and recent returnee Emma.

=== Mallorca (2022) ===
Mallorca aired 5 episodes in one week throughout August 2022.

=== Series 24 (2022) ===
The twenty-fourth series began airing on 17 October 2022 and concluded after ten episodes on 19 December 2022.

=== Bali and Bonjour Baby (2022) ===
Bali series began airing on 20 December 2022 and concluded after five episodes on 26 December 2022.

=== Series 25 (2023) ===
The twenty-fifth series began airing on 27 March 2023 and concluded after eleven episodes on 5 June 2023.

=== Corsica (2023) ===
Made in Chelsea's Corisca aired from 13 to 16 August 2023. Most cast members returned as well as new cast members, Jane and Geronimo. Other cast members who didn't return are Ollie and Gareth Locke, James Taylor and Maeva D'Ascanio, Verity, Issy and Emily Blackwell.

Following an exhilarating spring in Made in Chelsea, the group jet off to Mallorca for a sun-soaked holiday, but the trip quickly descends into chaos. Just days after arriving, Sam Prince and Inga Valentiner bring their long-term relationship to an end, leaving tensions high as they are forced to continue sharing villa with the rest of the group. Meanwhile, sparks fly between Miles Nazaire and Jane, but their growing connection is cut by the surprise arrival of Yasmine Zweegers. Fresh from his turbulent break-up with Olivia Bentley, Tristan Phipps throws himself into the Mallorca getaway and soon grows close to Yasmine, with the pair enjoying a blossoming holiday romance. But when Tristan returns to Chelsea for work, Yasmine remains in Mallorca - and during his absence, an unexpected connection begins to form between her and Sam Prince. Things take a dramatic turn when Liv arrives on the island and makes an observation to the group about Yasmine and Sam Prince being quite cosy with each other. As loyalties begin to blur, the situation becomes even more complicated: Tristan and Sam are business partners, while Yasmine and Inga are best friends. At an explosive group dinner, secrets are exposed and the true extent of Sam and Yasmine's betrayal comes to light - the pair have shared intimate moments behind Inga's back and admit that they would be open to pursuing a relationship once back in Chelsea. The revelation sends shockwaves through the friendship group. With many of their friends disapproving of the romance, Sam and Yasmine find themselves isolated as accusations of betrayal, disloyalty and heartbreak dominate the holiday.

=== Series 26 (2023) ===
The twenty-sixth series began on 9 October 2023.

=== Sydney (2023) ===
Made in Chelsea: Sydney aired in December 2023.

=== Series 27 (2024) ===
Made in Chelsea Season 27 officially premiered on April 15, 2024

=== Series 28 (2024) ===
Made in Chelsea Season 28 premiered on October 21, 2024

=== Series 29 (2025) ===
Series 29 began on 31 March 2025.

=== Series 30 (2025) ===
Series 30 began on 15 September 2025. The first two episodes were partly filmed in Thailand. Lisa Vanderpump made her debut in Series 30.

== Cast ==
This is a list of cast members currently appearing in the show.

Cast member	Series	Year
Sam Prince	13–CRO, 22–current	2017–18, 2021–current
James Taylor	14–BA, 20–30, 32-current	2017–2025, 2026-current
Tristan Phipps	16, 18–current	2018, 2019–current
Maeva D'Ascanio	17–BA, 20–30, 32-current	2019–2025, 2026-current
Angus Findlay	17–18, 22, 28–current	2019, 2021, 2024–current
Oliver "Chuggs" Wallis	17, 30–current	2019, 2025–current
Paris Smith	20-32	2020-2026
Inga Valentiner	21–26, 31–current	2021–2023, 2026–current
Yasmine Zweegers	24–27, 29-current	2022–current
Jack Taylor	BBB, 27–current	2022, 2024–current
Freddy Knatchbull	25-current	2023–current
David "Temps" Templer	25–current	2023–current
Jazz Saunders	26–current	2023–current
Jules Pollard	27–current	2024–current
Sam Vanderpump	27–current	2024–current
Zeyno Taylan	27–current	2024–current
Rebecca "Beks" Collins	28-current	2024–current
Abi Luffman	28, 30–current	2024, 2025–current
Olivia "Livvy" Barker	29-current	2025-current
Alice Yaxley	29-current	2025-current
Kabir Khuruna	29–30, 32-current	2025, 2026-current
Arman Pouladian-Kari	29-current	2025-current
Julian Cash	30, 32–current	2025, 2026–current
Kit Paterson	30–current	2025–current
Georgia Stork	31–current	2026–current
Philip Pollard	31–current	2026–current
Maali Khan-Stokes	32–current	2026–current
Liam Ventom	32–current	2026–current
Eve Alero Vince-Odozi	32–current	2026–current
James Westbrook Elliott	32–current	2026–current

== Reception ==
The series has received mixed reviews from critics and has been heavily compared to The Only Way Is Essex, "The participants are slimmer, sleeker, moneyed and honey-coloured than their Essex counterparts – but some things remain the same". Keith Watson of Metro said, "What is it these fake reality soaps that proves so gruesomely addictive?", and "So there you go, just what you need in your life: pointless people." whilst Digital Spy said "It's all incredibly silly, but we're already falling in love with it a little bit and it will fill a lovely TOWIE-shaped hole for the summer".

The first series of the show was positive with viewers. The show drew 583,000 viewers with its first episode and this figure rose to 624,000 for the second episode with another 117,800 viewers watching the repeat an hour later. It also became the most tweeted show on Channel 4 for 2011.

The first series finale managed to draw in 718,000 viewers on its first showing and was the highest rated E4 for the entire day. The series managed a high of 791,000 viewers for its sixth episode.

The show was renewed for a second series before the end of the first. E4's commissioning editor, David Williams, explained that "the staggering amount of audience engagement has proven it to be a perfect fit for E4's young audience".

The show managed to trend worldwide on Twitter during the first episode of the second series and carried on trending in the UK for twelve hours after the episode had ended.

The third series broke records for the show when it premiered with over 900,000 viewers and reached over a million viewers for the ninth episode, achieving a series peak.

The fifth series premiered with 956,000 viewers on 8 April 2013. The series did not fall under 800,000 viewers each week, making it the most-viewed series since the show began. The sixth series showed viewing figures continue to grow with over 1.1 million viewers tuning in for the premiere of the seventh series in April 2014.

The show won its first BAFTA on 12 May 2013 at the 2013 BAFTAs in the Reality and Structured Factual Category.

Series 7 became the first series of Made in Chelsea to average over 1 million viewers for each episode whereas spin-off series NYC had a series average of over 1 million viewers. Series 8 continued to attract large audiences for E4, whilst 2015's ninth series also proved successful. 2015 spin-off series "LA" also averaged at 874,000 viewers per episode and the tenth series had a series average of 841,000. The first series broadcast in 2016, series eleven, had a series average of 891,000. This was the highest series average since series eight in 2014.

== Related media ==
=== Made in Chelsea: The Game ===
An official app created by Channel 4 was made available to download in the fourth quarter of 2013. A second version was made available to download for Android and iOS phones on 3 April 2014. The game's synopsis reads "The Chelsea gang are back in town with a bang, for yet exciting adventures! Enjoy a host of brand new story lines – as you once again play to become the ultimate socialite in the world of BAFTA-winning TV show Made in Chelsea. Party with even of the cast as you rise the social ladder – with Stevie (your new flatmate), Alex and Fran joining the ranks alongside the likes of Spencer, Proudlock and Binky". You get to choose what you want to wear with the help of Mark Francis and Victoria and you can wear the clothes that other members of the cast wear.

=== Mad on Chelsea ===
Mad on Chelsea is an online show discussing the antics in Made in Chelsea. It is shown on Channel 4's online TV service 4oD. Series one was presented by stand-up comedian Jenny Beade, who usually greet two of the Chelsea cast to discuss, dissect and deliberate their latest happenings. She get the low down on the fans' reactions to the weekly highs and lows of Chelsea life, as well as exploring the locations seen in the series. The first series corresponded with the beginning of series six, with each episode being made available to view through 4oD.

A second series coincided with Made in Chelsea's seventh series return, with each episode being uploaded 48 hours before each weekly episode of Made in Chelsea. The show took a new format; it was no longer presented by Jenny Bede. Instead conversation was led by various cast members. Episode one of the second series was hosted by Made in Chelsea's Andy and Spencer, whilst episode two featured Proudlock and Lucy, and episode three featured Cheska and Stevie.

The online-show did not return for spin-off series NYC, nor did it return for any other future series'.

=== Live in Chelsea ===
With the second series of Made in Chelsea a live spin-off concept called Live in Chelsea (presented by Joel Dommett) was launched. It involves members of the cast taking turns in front a camera to answer questions directly from the audience live. The show is being filmed in secret locations within Chelsea and shown exclusively through the internet rather than TV – using the ShowCaster platform.

=== Played in Chelsea ===
With the sixth series of Made in Chelsea a series of music gigs were launched with cast members presenting them. The gigs were made available for the public to attend through purchasing tickets. Four gigs were confirmed, with them taking place throughout November 2013. E4 reads- Made in Chelsea, the BAFTA-winning E4 show that "has the best soundtrack on TV" (The Guardian) has always used the freshest music around and the series has an extensive following as the place to find the best new tunes on television. To celebrate six great music series in Chelsea we are launching Played in Chelsea – a season of four gigs on 5, 10, 20 and 26 November 2013. Staged at Under the Bridge in Chelsea, these gigs will be streamed live on the E4 website and made available as a highlights show later in the week on the Channel 4 catch up platform 4oD. Each night of Played in Chelsea was hosted by two of the Made in Chelsea cast and featured three different bands, all of which have featured on Made in Chelsea.

=== Educating Binky ===
Educating Binky is a series of short episodes available to watch on Channel 4's online service 4oD. Made in Chelsea's Mark Francis takes fellow cast member Binky Felstead on a tour of London to educate her in the ways of high-end style. As of 29 December 2014, a total of eight episodes have been made available to watch on the online platform.

=== MIC:FIT ===
MIC:FIT is a fitness DVD enabling you to work out with the Chelsea cast and stay in shape. The DVD synopsis reads "We share the hottest fitness trends, that help us stay in shape when we're not partying in Chelsea. These workouts will get you fit for St. Tropez and looking hot for The King's Road!" It stars major cast members Spencer Matthews, Lucy Watson, Oliver Proudlock, and Binky Felstead. The DVD was released on 1 December 2014 and received positive reviews.

=== Beyond Chelsea ===
Binky Felstead, Rosie Fortescue and Lucy Watson featured in a reality TV series documenting their lives in 2024 which ran for three episodes. Ollie Locke also appeared in Beyond Chelsea. It was produced by Monkey Kingdom for Channel 4. A second series was commissioned for broadcast in 2026.

== Related projects ==
=== In Bed with Jamie ===
In Bed with Jamie is a series of All 4 exclusive shorts featuring cast member Jamie Laing. Every episode follows the format of Jamie interviewing someone in their bed as well as playing a game. The guests have included Spencer Matthews, Ollie Locke and Rosie Fortescue amongst other cast members but people who feature in other E4 shows such as Tattoo Fixers, Drifters and Virtually Famous have also made appearances. Two episodes have debuted each month since June 2015.

=== Jamie Laing's Happy Hour ===
Jamie Laing's Happy Hour is a YouTube channel created by long-serving cast member Jamie Laing. He explains that the channel will be where he shares his "vlogs, funny shenanigans, stupid pranks and crazy challenges". The channel is exclusive to Jamie Laing and unrelated to the story-lines of Made in Chelsea. He did however capture his journey to the South of France on 6 June 2016 to begin filming the spin-off series, South of France.

== Home media ==
Series	Episodes	Discs	DVD release date
Series	Episodes	Discs	Region 2
1	8	2	19 September 2011
All episodes from the first series
2	12	3	16 April 2012
All episodes from the second series plus end of series Studio Special and Christmas Special
3	11	3	15 October 2012
All episodes from the third series plus end of series Studio Special
4	12	3	8 April 2013
All episodes from the fourth series plus end of series Studio Special and Christmas Special
5	11	3	2 September 2013
All episodes from the fifth series plus end of series Studio Special
6	12	3	7 April 2014
All episodes from the sixth series plus end of series Studio Special and Christmas Special

== International broadcasts ==
The Style Network has bought the rights to air the show in the United States, and began to carry it on 12 November 2012 from the first series. Made in Chelsea currently airs in Australia on the Foxtel owned pay TV channel LifeStyle You.

== See also ==
- The Only Way Is Essex
- Geordie Shore
- Desperate Scousewives
- The Real Housewives of Cheshire
- Ladies of London
- Desi Rascals
- Taking New York
