= Made in Chelsea: NYC =

- No. of episodes: 6

Release
- Original network: E4
- Original release: 10 August – 14 September 2014

Season chronology
- ← Previous; Series 7 Next → Series 8

Made in Chelsea: NYC, the spin-off series of Made in Chelsea, a British structured-reality television programme, began airing on 10 August 2014 on E4. The series concluded on 14 September 2014 after 6 episodes. It was announced on 18 March 2014 that the cast of Made in Chelsea would be travelling to New York City to film a special series of the show. Despite the series featuring all of the Chelsea cast, there were notable absences from Andy Jordan, Georgia "Toff" Toffolo, and Sophie Hermann.

A number of American cast members were introduced during this series including Alik Alfus, Billie Carroll, and Jules Hamilton. It also included a brief return of original cast member Gabriella Ellis, who was originally featured in the show from series one to four. Alik was the only one who remained as a cast member after this series.

This series was also the last to feature original cast member Cheska Hull as well as Riley Uggla. The spin-off series included the love blossoming between Alik and Louise, the competition between Spencer and Stevie for Billie before Stevie’s ex-girlfriend Stephanie arrives, Alex attempting to make amends with people then leaving with more enemies than friends, and the revelation that Lucy and Proudlock have been hooking up. It was revealed that this would be a stand-alone series which would not be promoted as the eighth series. The eighth series in fact followed in October 2014.

== Cast ==
- Alex Mytton
- Alexandra "Binky" Felstead
- Alik Alfus
- Billie Carroll
- Fran Newman-Young
- Francesca "Cheska" Hull
- Gabriella Ellis
- Jamie Laing
- Jules Hamilton
- Louise Thompson
- Lucy Watson
- Mark-Francis Vandelli
- Oliver Proudlock
- Riley Uggla
- Rosie Fortescue
- Sam Thompson
- Spencer Matthews
- Stephanie Pratt
- Stevie Johnson
- Victoria Baker-Harber

== Episodes ==
No. overall	No. in season	Title	Original release date	Duration	UK viewers
74	1	"American Girls Are Much More Open And Willing To Try New Things"	10 August 2014	60 minutes	974,000
As the group arrive in New York, there’s clear tension between Lucy and Rosie and it doesn’t take long before the pair end up clashing. Mark Francis introduces his friend Billie to everyone and Spencer takes an instant liking to her. With Billie showing Lucy around the area, she tells her she will introduce her to one of her nice male friends, Stevie. Binky announces that her and Alex have split and makes amends with the girls, and as Stevie and Billie begin to hit it off, Spencer is there to intrude on the situation. Alik asks Louise and Rosie out on a double date, and Jamie calls Alex…
75	2	"Even The Promiscuous Animals Would Like A Shot At Love"	17 August 2014	60 minutes	1,200,000
Stevie plans to impress Billie on their date but is unaware that Spencer has stolen his idea and has already taken her out. Alex arrives in New York to surprise Binky but she’s far from impressed. Going against her word, she agrees to meet him but gives him a frosty reception and tells him to go back to London. Jamie receives news of Alex getting with his ex-girlfriend leading to a huge confrontation. Knowing he’s got more enemies than friends, Alex decides to return home. Rosie enjoys her date with Jules not realising he’s also took a shine to Lucy. Cheska and Fran head back to Chelsea.
76	3	"I Will Not Be Hot Dogged!"	24 August 2014	60 minutes	987,000
Stevie is hurt to find out about Billie and Spencer’s date but continues to pursue her, and they end up kissing after he takes her rowing during their date. Jamie feels bad for forcing Alex to fly back to London, whilst Victoria attempts to get Mark to eat a hot dog. Rosie begins to fall for Jules as they go rock climbing together, however she’s blissfully unaware he’s leading a double life and has a girlfriend in New York. Billie agrees to a second date with both Spencer and Stevie leaving Lucy unimpressed at how she’s playing both boys. Alik and Louise continue to flirt.
77	4	"Do Not Involve Me In Your Slutty Board Game"	31 August 2014	60 minutes	1,095,000
Stevie becomes concerned by Billie and Spencer getting closer especially as Spencer begins to hang out with her friends. Lucy gets more annoyed with Billie and warns her not to break Stevie’s heart. Alik and Louise share a kiss and are interrupted by the arrival of her brother Sam. During a baseball competition love rivals Spencer and Stevie get too competitive. The girls find out Jules’ secret and have no choice but to tell Rosie, and as she confronts him about his secret girlfriend he confesses to having three. Billie realises she can’t play both boys and chooses Stevie over Spencer.
78	5	"Always Remember Boys, Persistence Is Key"	7 September 2014	60 minutes	819,000
The competition between love rivals Stevie and Spencer intensify as Billie arranges a girls weekend for her and Binky and Spencer invites himself along. Alik reveals to Louise that he thinks he’s falling for her and does not want her to return home to London. Stevie receives a huge surprise when Stephanie arrives in New York to win him back but she’s left upset to discover his new situation with Billie. Louise fears that something may be developing between Binky and Jamie, and Rosie continues to vent her anger to Jules. Stevie has a huge decision to make after realising he still likes Stephanie.
79	6	"Everyone's Hooking Up With Everybody"	14 September 2014	60 minutes	1,058,000
Proudlock accidentally reveals that Stevie and Stephanie have hooked up and the news quickly gets to Billie who is forced to take action. Rosie comes face-to-face with Jules’ girlfriend and she struggles to accept his situation, whilst Louise and Alik agree to make the effort to keep their relationship working long distance. Stevie is rocked when Billie and Stephanie discuss what he’s been saying to them both, and Jamie’s heart sinks after the revelation that Lucy and Proudlock have been hooking up whilst in New York. Mark Francis hosts a farewell boat party before the group return home.

== Ratings ==
Episode	Date	Official E4 rating	E4 weekly rank
Episode 1	10 August 2014	974,000	6
Episode 2	17 August 2014	1,200,000	2
Episode 3	24 August 2014	987,000	4
Episode 4	31 August 2014	1,095,000	2
Episode 5	7 September 2014	819,000	7
Episode 6	14 September 2014	1,058,000	3
Average		1,022,000	4
