= Ollie Locke =

British actor and television personality

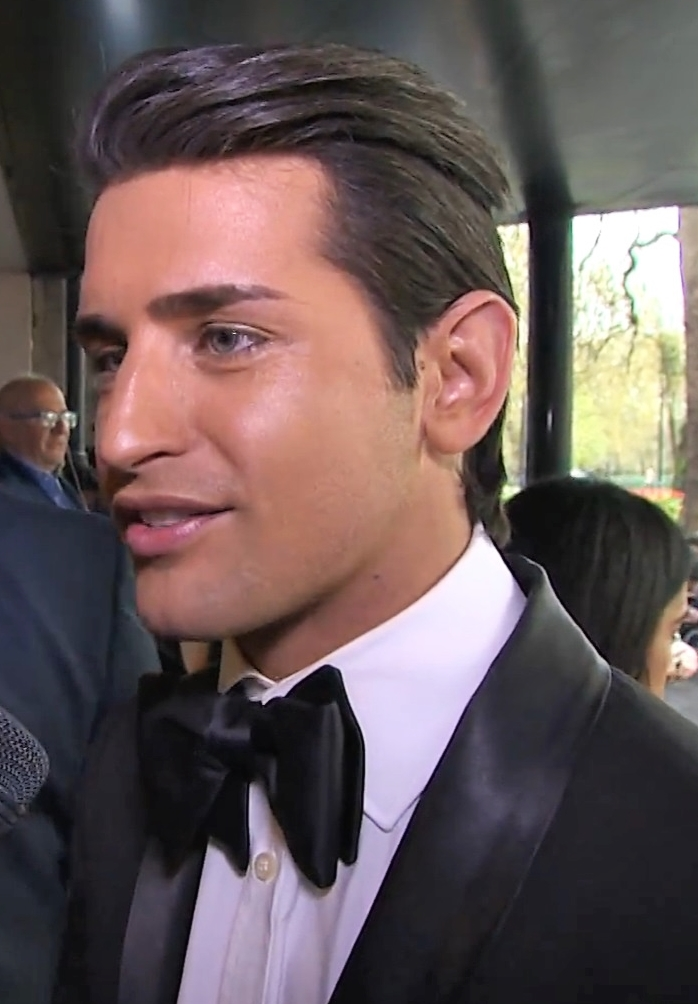
- Locke in 2015
- Born: 20 March 1987 (age 39); Southampton, Hampshire, England
- Occupations: Television personality; actor
- Years active: 2011–present
- Television: Made in Chelsea; Celebrity Big Brother
- Spouse: Gareth Locke (m. 2020)
- Children: 2

Oliver Locke (born 20 March 1987) is an English television personality and actor from Southampton, England, known for appearing in E4's constructed reality series Made in Chelsea. He has also competed in the thirteenth series of Celebrity Big Brother, as well as Celebrity Hunted.

== Life and career ==
Locke's mother is former BBC Radio Solent DJ Sarah Locke.

While on Made in Chelsea, Locke came out as bisexual, and then later came out as gay. At the time, he wrote a book called Laid in Chelsea.

In January 2014, Locke became a housemate in the thirteenth series of Celebrity Big Brother. He finished in third place behind Dappy and winner Jim Davidson.

Locke has been seen on such shows as Celebrity Juice, Alan Carr's Chatty Man, The Jonathan Ross Show, Britain's Got More Talent, The Xtra Factor, Do the Dishes, the twelfth series of 8 Out of 10 Cats and the second series of Fake Reaction.

In 2016, Locke and his co-founders Jack Rogers and Maxim Cheremkhin founded the gay dating app Chappy.

In 2018, Locke landed his first major film role, Greed, directed by Michael Winterbottom. In 2022, Locke appeared as a contestant on Celebrity Hunted alongside husband Gareth. He was the first candidate caught in the series. In 2026 he and Gareth appeared on the second series of Beyond Chelsea and Vanderpump Villa season 3 in England with fellow Made in Chelsea cast Sam Vanderpump and Sophie Hermann.

== Books ==
- Locke, Ollie (2013). Laid in Chelsea (1st ed.). HarperCollins Publishers Limited. ISBN 978-0-00-751395-6.
- Locke, Ollie (28 March 2013). Laid in Chelsea: My Life Uncovered (2nd ed.). HarperCollins UK. ISBN 978-0-00-751397-0.
- Locke, Ollie (21 November 2018). The Islands of Fandye. Bumpindanite Limited. ISBN 978-1-5272-3302-7.
- Locke, Ollie (25 April 2023). The Faraway Adventures of Henry Bogget: Henry and The Great White Whale. Cranthorpe Millner Publishers. ISBN 978-1-80378-126-6.
