= List of Old Portmuthians =

Former students of Portsmouth Grammar School

List of notable Old Portmuthians - that is, former pupils of The Portsmouth Grammar School. Alumni often join The Old Portmuthian Club, founded in 1885.

== Born in the 19th century ==
- Sir Oscar de Glanville (1867–1942), President of the Legislative Council of Burma
- Roy Horniman (born Robert Horniman) (1868–1930), actor and theatre proprietor
- William Macbride Childs (1869–1939), first vice-chancellor of the University of Reading
- Benjamin Guy Horniman (1873–1948), journalist and supporter of Indian independence
- Major Frank Harvey RMLI (1873–1916), awarded a posthumous Victoria Cross for bravery on board HMS Lion at the Battle of Jutland (1916).
- Cyril Garbett (1875–1955), Archbishop of York (1942–1955)
- Percy F. Westerman (1876–1959), author of children's literature
- Sir David Gammans (1895–1957), Conservative MP
- Leonard Dawe (1889–1963), English amateur footballer, who later compiled crosswords for the Daily Telegraph newspaper

== Born in the early 20th century ==
- Wally Hammond (1903–1965), captain of the England cricket team
- J. C. Carothers (1903-1989], colonial psychiatrist
- Prof. A. J. Arberry (1905–1969), translator and scholar in Arabic, Persian, and Islamic studies
- Air Chief Marshal Sir Harry Broadhurst (1905–1995), Commander-in-Chief Allied Air Forces Central Europe
- Sir Arthur Young (1907–1979), British and colonial police chief, police reformer
- Harold Hall (1913–2004), civil servant and cricketer
- Michael Ripper (1913–2000), film actor
- Prof. G. E. L. Owen (1922–1982), classicist and philosopher
- Alan Bristow (1923–2009), pilot and founder of Bristow Helicopters
- James Clavell (1924–1994), novelist, screenwriter and director
- Christopher Logue (1926–), critically acclaimed poet
- Sir Malcolm Bates (1934–2009), chairman of London Regional Transport from 1999–2003
- Sir Peter Viggers (1938– 2020) MP for Gosport (1974–2010), gained national press attention during the 2009 expenses scandal for his duck house claim
- Air Chief Marshal Sir Richard Johns (1939–), former Chief of the Air Staff
- Prof. Andrew Lyne (1942–), former Director of Jodrell Bank Observatory
- Major-General David Burden CB CVO CBE (1942–), Military Secretary (1997–1999)
- Fred Dinenage, presenter of ITV's local news programme, Meridian Tonight
- Paul Jones (1942–), singer with Manfred Mann (1962–1966) and presenter of The Blues Show on BBC Radio 2 (1986–2018)
- Sir Digby William David Cayley, (1944–), 11th Bt., Assistant Master between 1968 and 1973; also Stonyhurst College, Abingdon School and Marlborough College.
- Richard Simonsen, (1945–), athlete
- Richard Bradley, (1946–), archaeologist and academic
- Richard McIlwaine, (1950–), cricketer

== Born in the later 20th century ==
- Ian Osterloh (1960–), Clinical researcher attributed with the creation of 'Viagra' as well as numerous cardiovascular drugs.
- Mel Stride (1961–), Conservative MP for Central Devon (2010–present), current Shadow Chancellor of the Exchequer (2024–present) and former Secretary of State for Work and Pensions (2022–2024)
- Jock Clear (1963–), senior performance engineer working for Scuderia Ferrari in Formula One racing, former race engineer for Lewis Hamilton (2013–14), current driver coach for Charles Leclerc.
- Mike Wedderburn (1964–), TV sports presenter for Sky and Sky Sports News.
- Ed Richards (1965–), Chief Executive of Ofcom and former special adviser to Prime Ministers Tony Blair and Gordon Brown
- Roger Black (1966–), Olympic silver medallist sprint and relay runner representing Great Britain
- Andrew Burns (1969-), Royal Navy Admiral.
- Murray Gold (1969–), TV, film and stage composer, whose work notably includes Doctor Who, since 2005
- James Bobin (1972–), film director, writer and producer; worked as a director and writer on The 11 O'Clock Show, Da Ali G Show and directed The Muppets.
- Rick Edwards (1979-), television personality, journalist, author and host of Impossible
- Mike Wozniak (1979–), comedian, actor and host of Junior Taskmaster
- Dave Holby (1980–), Holder of three British and nineteen world indoor rowing records including the Guinness World Record for fastest solo row around the earth's equator.
- Ant Middleton (1981–), former special forces soldier, writer, political and television personality and former host of SAS: Who Dares Wins
- Jake George (1994–), cricketer.
- Robert Gibson (1994–), cricketer.
- Isaac Waddington (1999–), singer, pianist and finalist on the ninth series of Britain's Got Talent

== Born in the 21st century ==
- Finn Elliot (2002–), actor, starred in The Crown and The Last Kingdom
