= Osterloh =

Osterloh is a German surname. Notable people with the name include:

- Adele Osterloh (1857–1946), German poet
- Gertrud Osterloh (1910–2012), German religious leader
- Gina Osterloh (born 1973), Filipino American artist
- Ian Osterloh, British clinical researcher
- Jörg Osterloh (born 1967), German historian
- Lerke Osterloh (born 1944), German judge, jurisprudent and tax law expert
- Lilia Osterloh (born 1978), American tennis player
- Margit Osterloh (born 1943), German and Swiss economist
- Rick Osterloh, American technology executive
- Robert Osterloh (1918–2001), American actor
- Sebastian Osterloh (born 1983), German ice hockey player

== See also ==
- Nowatske v. Osterloh
