= Tool Academy season 2 =

Tool Academy
- Season 2
- Starring: Jordan Murphy; Trina Dolenz
- No. of episodes: 10

Release
- Original network: VH1
- Original release: August 30 – November 8, 2009

Season chronology
- ← Previous; Season 1 Next → Season 3

Tool Academy 2 is the second season of the VH1 reality television series Tool Academy. Tool Academy 2 is a competitive reality television show featuring twelve "unsuspecting bad boys" who have been sent to "relationship boot camp". The second season premiered on August 30, 2009.

The men, all of whom have been nominated by their respective girlfriends, initially think they are taking part in a competition for the title of "International Party King" for Her energy drink. However, shortly after arriving they find out the truth: they are actually being entered into a "charm school" which focuses on teaching them how to behave as boyfriends. Each week, one contestant is eliminated and his girlfriend must choose whether or not to stay with him. The last contestant remaining will win a $100,000 prize and the title of "Mr. Awesome." Relationship counselor Trina Dolenz helps the contestants with their relationship problems and decides who is expelled.

The winner for the second season was T Shaw (Terry) and Nicole. T Shaw proposed to Nicole after winning the competition.

== Lessons of the Week ==
Badges

1. Dedication
2. Fidelity
3. Modesty
4. Appreciation
5. Maturity
6. Communication
7. Trust
8. Romance
9. Family Values
10. Commitment

== Contestants ==
Contestant			Girlfriend		Hometown	Status
Name	Age	Tool Name	Name	Age	Hometown	Status
Terry "T Shaw"	23	Dancin' Tool	Nicole	22	Champaign, IL	Winner in final episode
Tyler Synon	22	Tat-Tool	Shealyn	21	Lake Havasu City, AZ	Runner Up in episode 10
Stewart "Stew" Ellefson	22	Hillbilly Tool	Amanda	23	Benson, NC	Eliminated in episode 9
Charm Rice Brittian	18	S*** Talkin' Tool	Andrea MacGregor	22	Huntington Beach, CA	Eliminated in episode 8
Frank Alicea	23	Guy Liner Tool	Christina	21	Gainesville, FL	Eliminated in episode 7
Andre "Dre P."	24	B-Boy Wannabe Tool	Leah	26	Toledo, OH	Eliminated in episode 6
Daniel "Dan" Jovicevic	22	"Special" Tool	Shannon	22	Huntley, IL	Eliminated in episode 6
John Lamb	29	Giant Tool	Sarah	24	Plymouth, MA	Eliminated in episode 5
Mike A	24	Manscaping Tool	Rebecca	22	Mission Viejo, CA	Eliminated in episode 4
Justin "J Daddy"	23	Strong Island Tool	Kathleen	23	Sayville, NY	Eliminated in episode 3
Jon	31	Old Tool	Tracy	27	Tinley Park, IL	Eliminated in episode 2
Josh Riggs	25	Spray Tan Tool	Jamie Campbell	25	Las Vegas, NV	Eliminated in episode 1

== Episode progress ==
#	Contestants	Episodes									
#	Contestants	1	2	3	4	5	6	7	8	9	10
1	T Shaw	SAFE	SAFE	HIGH	SAFE	WIN	SAFE	RISK	SAFE	SAFE	WINNER
2	Tyler	SAFE	SAFE	SAFE	SAFE	HIGH	WIN	SAFE	WIN	SAFE	OUT
3	Stew	RISK	WIN	SAFE	HIGH	RISK	SAFE	WIN	RISK	OUT	JURY
4	Charm	SAFE	SAFE	RISK	SAFE	SAFE	RISK	RISK	OUT		JURY
5	Frank	SAFE	SAFE	SAFE	RISK	SAFE	RISK	OUT			JURY
6	Dre P.	SAFE	RISK	SAFE	SAFE	SAFE	OUT				
7	Dan	SAFE	RISK	SAFE	SAFE	SAFE	OUT				
8	John L.	RISK	SAFE	RISK	RISK	OUT					
9	Mike A.	SAFE	HIGH	WIN	OUT						
10	J Daddy	WIN	SAFE	OUT							
11	Jon S.	SAFE	OUT								
12	Josh	OUT									

The contestant won Tool Academy and the title "Mr. Awesome"
The contestant won a challenge and won a date with his girlfriend.
The contestant won a challenge, won a date with his girlfriend, and was first to receive a badge.
The contestant was the first to receive a badge.
The contestant was safe from being eliminated.
The contestant won a challenge and won a date with his girlfriend, but was at risk of being eliminated
The contestant was at risk of being eliminated.
The contestant won a challenge, won a date with his girlfriend, and was eliminated
The contestant was eliminated and his girlfriend decided to stay with him.
The contestant was eliminated and his girlfriend decided to leave him.
The contestant was eliminated and decided to leave his girlfriend.
The contestant was brought back as part of the jury.

== Episodes ==
=== Episode 1 ===
Original Broadcast - First aired August 30, 2009

- Lesson of the Week: Dedication
- Challenge: Testing their dedication from Relationship
- Challenge Reward: A romantic dinner
- Challenge Winner: Justin "J Daddy" and Kathleen
- Bottom 3: John L., Josh, Stew
- Eliminated: Josh (Jamie decided to stay with Josh)
- Episode Notes: After being eliminated, Josh did not go out the main door to meet his girlfriend, Jamie. He said that he would not go out and make himself look like an idiot being the first one to leave. The producer and head of security gave him chances to walk out, saying he was now trespassing, but Josh refused so he was forcibly removed by security, when even there, he hesitated. Jordan ran out, yelling at Josh that he had to leave ("You're a tool, you've been expelled, get the fuck out!"). Security led him out the backway. Josh and Jamie wouldn't leave because Josh wanted the car to be brought to him. Jamie decided to stay with Josh after he said "honest" to her, letting her know he was telling the truth.

=== Episode 2 ===
Original Broadcast - First aired September 6, 2009

- Lesson of the Week: Fidelity
- Challenge: Choreographing a cheer on the good and bad of their relationship
- Challenge Reward: Sexy Photoshoot and Hot Date
- Challenge Winner: Stew and Amanda
- Bottom 3: Dan, Dre P., and Jon S.
- Eliminated: Jon S. (Jon S. decided to leave Tracey)

=== Episode 3 ===
First aired September 20, 2009

- Lesson of the Week: Modesty
- Challenge: Beet Farmers
- Challenge Reward: Drive-in movie
- Challenge Winner: Mike A. and Rebecca
- Bottom 3: John L., Charm, J Daddy
- Eliminated: J Daddy (Kathleen decided to leave J Daddy)
- Episode Notes: Despite a somewhat strong showing in the previous episodes, J Daddy took neither the mirror exercise, nor the beet picking challenge seriously. Also, Kat and Leah revealed that they work as strippers, which ignited an argument over "ruining happy homes" from Shannon.

=== Episode 4 ===
First aired September 27, 2009

- Lesson of the Week: Appreciation
- Challenge: The tools must watch their girls go on dates with true gentlemen.
- Bottom 3: John L., Frank, Mike A.
- Eliminated: Mike A. (Rebecca decided to stay with Mike A.)

=== Episode 5 ===
First aired October 4, 2009

- Lesson of the Week: Maturity
- Challenge: Delivering eggs to the "nest".
- Challenge Reward: Romantic Dinner
- Challenge Winner: T Shaw (Terry) and Nicole
- Bottom 3: Stew, T Shaw (Terry), John L.
- Eliminated: John L. (Sarah decided to stay with John L.)
- Episode Notes: The reason for John L.'s elimination was his lack of maturity and his loss of temper, resulting in the damage of school property. He had promised to calm down and not lose his temper as much, but proved he was not able to do so. Terry was almost eliminated because during the therapy session, he blamed his problems on Nicole once again and made excuses. Also, during the challenge, he was more focused on winning than helping Nicole. At the end of the challenge, Shealyn had a sharp pain in her chest. While being checked by the paramedics, Tyler stayed with her the whole time. Therefore, he was first to receive his Maturity badge.

=== Episode 6 ===
First aired October 11, 2009

- Lesson of the Week: Communication
- Challenge: Build A Living Room
- Challenge Reward: Flat Screen TV, Conjugal Visit Room
- Challenge Winner: Tyler and Shealyn
- Eliminated: Dan (Shannon decided to stay with Dan)
  - Bottom 3: Charm, Dre P., Frank
- Eliminated: Dre P. (Leah decided to stay with Dre P.)
- Episode Notes: This episode had a double elimination.
- Reason for Dan's elimination: He couldn't give clear instructions to Shannon, during the challenge, and yelled at her.
- Reason for Dre P.'s elimination: He and Leah were like bombs and they couldn't control their anger.

=== Episode 7 ===
First aired October 18, 2009

- Lesson of the Week: Trust
- Challenge: Lie Detector Test, Obstacle Course
- Challenge Reward: Romantic Date
- Challenge Winner: Stew and Amanda
- Bottom 2: Charm, Frank
- Eliminated: Frank (Christina decided to leave Frank)

=== Episode 8 ===
First aired October 25, 2009

- Lesson of the Week: Romance
- Challenge: Camping Trip
- Challenge Reward: Date (How it was set is determined depending on how they place)
- Challenge Winner: Tyler and Shay (1st), Stew and Amanda (2nd), T-Shaw (Terry) and Nicole(3rd), Charm and Andrea (Last)
- Bottom 2: Charm, Stew
- Eliminated: Charm (Andrea decided to stay with Charm)

=== Episode 9 ===
First aired November 1, 2009

- Lesson of the Week: Family Values
- Special Guests: The Tools and Girlfriends Parents
- Challenge: Taking Care of Piglets
- To Do: Catch, Feed, Clean, Change the Piglets
- Challenge Reward: None (Girlfriend, Parent, Tool Baby Shower)
- Challenge Winner: No One
- Bottom: None, Stew was called first and eliminated
- Eliminated: Stew (Amanda decided to stay with Stew)

=== Episode 10 ===
First aired November 8, 2009

- Final Lesson: Commitment
- Challenge: Clean Mini Van
- Challenge Reward: Romantic Date
- Challenge Winner: Tyler and Shealyn
- Special Guests: Charm, Frank, Stew
- Runner-Up: Tyler (Shealyn decided to stay with Tyler)
- Winner: T Shaw (Nicole and T Shaw got engaged)
