= Tool Academy (British TV series) =

- Genre: Reality
- Directed by: Gary Brooks
- Presented by: Rick Edwards
- Starring: Dr. Sandra Scott
- Country of origin: United Kingdom
- Original language: English
- No. of series: 3
- No. of episodes: 24

Production
- Executive producer: Andrew Newman
- Running time: 60mins (inc. adverts)
- Production company: Objective Productions

Original release
- Network: E4
- Release: 10 January 2011 – 18 December 2012

Related
- Tool Academy

Tool Academy is a competitive British reality television game show featuring twelve "unsuspecting bad boys" who have been sent to "relationship boot camp". It is presented by Rick Edwards and based on the U.S. version. Dr. Sandra Scott helps the contestants with their relationship problems and helps Edwards decide who is expelled.

== Format ==
The twelve men, all of whom have been nominated by their respective girlfriends, fiancées or wives, initially think they are taking part in a competition for the title of "Britain's Ultimate Lad", "King of Men" or in the latest series "Man Games 2012". However, shortly after arriving they find out the truth: they are actually being entered into a "charm school" which focuses on teaching them how to behave as boyfriends. Each week, one contestant is eliminated and his girlfriend must choose whether or not to stay with him. The last contestant remaining will win a £25,000 prize and graduate Tool Academy.

== Transmissions ==
Series	Start date	End date	Episodes
1	10 January 2011	21 February 2011	7
2	1 November 2011	20 December 2011	8
3	23 October 2012	18 December 2012	9
