= Tool Academy season 3 =

Tool Academy
- Season 3
- The cast of Tool Academy 3
- Starring: Jordan Murphy; Trina Dolenz
- No. of episodes: 8

Release
- Original network: VH1
- Original release: February 14 – April 4, 2010

Season chronology
- ← Previous; Season 2

Tool Academy 3 is the third (and to date last) installment to Tool Academy. This season was notable for including the series' first female tools (Jennavecia and Courtney), first same-sex couple (Courtney and Cheron), and first married couple (Kevin and Jermika). The show premiered on February 14, 2010. There were 10 contestants.

== Lessons of the Week ==
Badges

1. Communication
2. Fidelity
3. Modesty
4. Appreciation
5. Maturity
6. Trust
7. Family Values
8. Commitment

== Contestants ==
Contestant			Partner		Status
Name	Gender	Tool Name	Name	Gender	Status
Jacob Tapia (JT Extreme)	Male	Neander-Tool	Christie	Female	Winner in final episode
Angelo Giannako	Male	Ripped/Teary Tool	Dayna Mugno	Female	Runner Up in final episode
Jennavecia Russo	Female	Toolette	Kyle	Male	Eliminated in episode 7
Kevin Craft	Male	Double-Talkin' Tool	Jermika	Female	Eliminated in episode 6
Jordan Alexander	Male	Boyband Tool	Rachel Ostreich	Female	Eliminated in episode 5
Tommy	Male	Loony Tool	Kate	Female	Quit in episode 5
Courtney Barcellos	Female	Lady Lovin' Tool	Cheron Rice	Female	Eliminated in episode 4
Daniel	Male	Glow Stick Tool	Lesley	Female	Eliminated in episode 3
Shawn Goble	Male	Surfin' Tool	Emily Reno	Female	Eliminated in episode 2
Chasyn Rance	Male	Wrestlin' Tool	Amanda	Female	Quit in Episode 1

== Episode Progress ==
#	Contestants	Episodes							
#	Contestants	1	2	3	4	5	6	7	8
1	Jacob	SAFE	SAFE	RISK	SAFE	RISK	RISK	HIGH	WINNER
2	Angelo	SAFE	RISK	SAFE	WIN	WIN	HIGH	RISK	OUT
3	Jennavecia	WIN	RISK	SAFE	SAFE	HIGH	SAFE	OUT	
4	Kevin	SAFE	WIN	SAFE	RISK	SAFE	OUT		
5	Jordan	SAFE	SAFE	RISK	SAFE	OUT			
6	Tommy	SAFE	SAFE	SAFE	SAFE	QUIT			
7	Courtney	SAFE	SAFE	SAFE	OUT				
8	Daniel	SAFE	SAFE	OUT					
9	Shawn	SAFE	OUT						
10	Chasyn	QUIT							

The contestant won Tool Academy.
The contestant won a challenge and won a date with their partner.
The contestant won a challenge, won a date with their partner, and was first to receive a badge.
The contestant was the first to receive a badge.
The contestant was safe from being eliminated.
The contestant was at risk of being eliminated.
The contestant was eliminated and their partner decided to stay with them.
The contestant was eliminated and their partner decided to leave them.
The contestant was eliminated and decided to leave their partner.
The contestant quit the show, and left their partner.
The contestant and his partner chose to split up and leave outside of elimination.

== Episodes ==
=== Episode 1 ===
First aired February 14, 2010

- Lesson of the Week: Communication
- Challenge: Dog House
- Challenge Reward: Romantic Dinner
- Challenge Winner: Jennavecia, Kyle
- Bottom: None
- Eliminated: None
- Quit: Chasyn
- Episode Notes: Chasyn became the first tool to drop out of the Tool Academy because he thought he was better than the program. In return, all the remaining Tools made it through to the next round. Also Angelo was at first the "Ripped Tool", but during therapy he became the "Teary Tool".

=== Episode 2 ===
First aired February 21, 2010

- Lesson of the Week: Fidelity
- Challenge: Create A Song And Perform "Tool-e-Oke"
- Challenge Reward: Romantic Date
- Challenge Winner: Kevin, Jermika
- Bottom: Angelo, Shawn, Jennavecia
- Eliminated: Shawn (Emily decided to stay with Shawn)

=== Episode 3 ===
First aired February 28, 2010

- Lesson of the Week: Modesty
- Challenge: None
- Bottom: Daniel, Jacob, Jordan
- Eliminated: Daniel (Daniel decided to leave Lesley)

=== Episode 4 ===
First aired March 14, 2010

- Lesson of the Week: Appreciation
- Challenge: Create A Dinner Party
- Challenge Reward: Conjugal Visit Room
- Challenge Winner: Angelo, Dayna
- Bottom: Kevin, Courtney
- Eliminated: Courtney (Cheron decided to leave Courtney)

=== Episode 5 ===
First aired March 14, 2010

- Lesson of the Week: Maturity
- Challenge: Pay Bills
- Challenge Reward: Romantic Date, $1,624.25
- Challenge Winner: Angelo, Dayna
- Quit: Tommy (Tommy and Kate decided to break up and quit) Tommy was sleeping with someone else when he was with Kate
- Bottom: Jacob, Jordan
- Eliminated: Jordan (Rachel decided to stay with Jordan)

=== Episode 6 ===
First aired March 21, 2010

- Lesson of the Week: Trust
- Challenge: Human Lie Detector Test
- Helping Their Partners By: Setting Up a Romantic Date
- Bottom: Jacob, Kevin
- Eliminated: Kevin (Jermika decided to stay with Kevin)

=== Episode 7 ===
First aired March 28, 2010

- Lesson of the Week: Family Values
- Special Guests: The Couple's Parents
- Challenge: To Take Care of Fake Babies
- Bottom 2: Angelo, Jennavecia
- Eliminated: Jennavecia (Kyle decided to stay with Jennavecia)

Jennavecia hit Angelo and Dayna.

=== Episode 8 ===
First aired April 4, 2010

- Lesson of the Week: Commitment
- Runner Up: Angelo (Dayna decided to stay with Angelo)
- Winner: Jacob

== Winner ==
Jacob was the graduate and winner of Tool Academy 3. Angelo, in his exit interview, felt the decision was wrong and that he wanted to graduate. He correlated the experience as "..the one student who sits there and studies the whole time, and does everything they are supposed to do, and then you have student at the end who just tries to cram everything in the night before, and cheats a little bit."
