= List of most watched United States television broadcasts of 2003 =

The following is a list of most watched United States television broadcasts of 2003.

== Most watched by week ==
Broadcast (primetime only)
Week of	Title	Network	Viewers (in millions)	Ref.
January 6	CSI: Crime Scene Investigation	CBS	25.48	
January 13	AFC Championship	CBS	41.46	
January 20	Super Bowl XXXVII	ABC	88.64	
January 27	CSI: Crime Scene Investigation	CBS	27.48	
February 3	20/20	ABC	27.11	
February 10	CSI: Crime Scene Investigation	CBS	27.21	
February 17	Joe Millionaire	Fox	40.03	
February 24	CSI: Crime Scene Investigation	CBS	22.88	
March 3	Survivor	CBS	23.33	
March 10	CSI: Crime Scene Investigation	CBS	28.60	
March 17	75th Academy Awards	ABC	33.04	
March 24	American Idol (Tues)	Fox	19.80	
March 31	CSI: Crime Scene Investigation	CBS	26.37	
April 7	CSI: Crime Scene Investigation	CBS	26.45	
April 14	American Idol (Tues)	Fox	19.98	
April 21	CSI: Crime Scene Investigation	CBS	25.22	
April 28	CSI: Crime Scene Investigation	CBS	22.67	
May 5	CSI: Crime Scene Investigation	CBS	25.10	
May 12	Friends	NBC	25.46	
May 19	American Idol (Tues)	Fox	38.06	
May 26	CSI: Crime Scene Investigation	CBS	13.34	
June 2	Everybody Loves Raymond	CBS	15.27	
June 9	CSI: Crime Scene Investigation	CBS	14.58	
June 16	CSI: Crime Scene Investigation	CBS	14.32	
June 23	CSI: Crime Scene Investigation	CBS	13.80	
June 30	CSI: Miami	CBS	12.07	
July 7	For Love or Money	NBC	12.90	
July 14	2003 MLB All-Star Game	Fox	13.81	
July 21	CSI: Crime Scene Investigation	CBS	13.34	
July 28	CSI: Crime Scene Investigation	CBS	13.17	
