= Tool Academy (American TV series) =

- Starring: Jordan Murphy; Trina Dolenz
- Country of origin: United States
- No. of seasons: 3
- No. of episodes: 27

Production
- Executive producers: SallyAnn Salsano; Jim Ackerman; Dave Hamilton
- Running time: 60 minutes
- Production companies: 495 Productions; VH1

Original release
- Network: VH1
- Release: January 11, 2009 – April 4, 2010

Tool Academy is a competitive reality television show featuring "unsuspecting bad boys" (and women) who have been sent to "relationship boot camp". The contestants, all of whom have been nominated by their respective partners, initially think they are taking part in a competition for a title. However, shortly after arriving they find out the truth: they are actually being entered into a "charm school" which focuses on teaching them how to behave as partners. Each week, one contestant is eliminated and his/her partner must choose whether or not to stay with him/her. The last contestant remaining wins a $100,000 prize. The show was hosted by reality television show host Jordan Murphy alongside relationship counselor Trina Dolenz, who helped the contestants with their relationship problems and decided who was expelled.

== Airing of the show ==
Season	Premiere	Finale	Reunion	Winners	Runners up	Number of contestants	Number of episodes
Season One	January 11, 2009	March 8, 2009	March 15, 2009	Name: Josh (Joshua) Douglas	Name: Matsuflex (Ryan Matsunaga)	9	9
Season One	January 11, 2009	March 8, 2009	March 15, 2009	Wife: Ashley Pellegrino	Girlfriend: Jenna Fenton	9	9
Season Two	August 30, 2009	November 8, 2009	None	Name: T Shaw (Terry)	Name: Tyler Synon	12	10
Season Two	August 30, 2009	November 8, 2009	None	Fiancée: Nicole	Girlfriend: Shealyn	12	10
Season Three	February 14, 2010	April 4, 2010	None	Name: Jacob Tapia	Name: Angelo	10	8
Season Three	February 14, 2010	April 4, 2010	None	Girlfriend: Christie	Girlfriend: Dayna	10	8

== Lessons of the Week and Badges to Earn ==
Badges

1. Honesty (Season 3)
2. Humility (Season 1)
3. Communication (Seasons 1–3)
4. Trust (Seasons 1–3)
5. Family Values (Seasons 1–3)
6. Fidelity (Seasons 1–3)
7. Maturity (Seasons 1–3)
8. Romance (Season 1-Season 2)
9. Commitment (Seasons 1-3)
10. Dedication (Season 2)
11. Appreciation (Seasons 2-3)
12. Modesty (Season 2)

== Season one ==
The nine men, all of whom have been nominated by their respective girlfriends, initially think they are taking part in a competition for the title of "Mr. Awesome." However, shortly after arriving they find out the truth: they are actually being entered into a "charm school" which focuses on teaching them how to behave as boyfriends. Each week, one contestant is eliminated and his girlfriend must choose whether or not to stay with him. The last contestant remaining will win a $100,000 prize. Relationship counselor Trina Dolenz helps the contestants with their relationship problems and decides who is expelled.

The winner for the first season of Tool Academy was Josh and Ashley. Josh proposed to Ashley after winning the competition, and they got married directly after the graduation ceremony.

== Season two ==
A casting call for a second season was announced at the end of the reunion show. The second season of Tool Academy was slated for premiere August 2, 2009 but was changed to August 31, 2009, then was later changed again to August 30, 2009. The show's promo was shown on August 3, 2009 during the premiere of Real Chance of Love 2. The winner for the second season of Tool Academy was T Shaw (Terry) "Dancin Tool" and Nicole. T Shaw proposed to Nicole after winning the competition.

== Season three ==
The first episode premiered on February 14, 2010. This season's competitors are both men and women, nominated by their respective partners, including one lesbian couple. The tools and toolettes believe they are competing for the title of Party Ambassador. The winner for the third season of Tool Academy was Jacob "Neander Tool" and Christie.

== Controversy and pornographic performance ==
Six cast members from various seasons of Tool Academy filmed pornographic videos for the website Reality Revealed, an offshoot of the gay porn website Straight College Men. From January through March 2010 the videos were released around two weeks apart. Stewart "Stew" Ellefson, Tyler Synon, Daniel "Dan" Jovicevic, and John Lamb of Season 2 appeared in videos, along with Matsuflex (Ryan Matsunaga) and Shawn Southern of Season 1.

A lawsuit was filed against Bait & Tackle, the company running the websites, by the production company of Tool Academy, who assert that all of these men are in violation of their contracts.

== UK Version ==
On October 21, 2010, Broadcast Magazine reported that Objective Productions would be making Tool Academy for E4 in United Kingdom. The series stays true to the US version, albeit observing certain cultural variations on the format. Channel 4 regular Rick Edwards presents the series alongside TV psychiatrist Dr Sandra Scott.
