= Richard McIlwaine =

English cricketer

Richard Mcllwaine
Personal information
- Full name: Richard Johnston Mcllwaine
- Born: 16 March 1950 (age 76); Portsmouth, Hampshire, England
- Batting: Right-handed
- Bowling: Right-arm medium

Domestic team information
- Years: Team
- 1969–1970: Hampshire

Career statistics
Competition	First-class
Matches	4
Runs scored	29
Batting average	14.50
100s/50s	–/–
Top score	17
Balls bowled	558
Wickets	4
Bowling average	68.25
5 wickets in innings	–
10 wickets in match	–
Best bowling	2/40
Catches/stumpings	1/–
- Source: Cricinfo, 14 December 2009

Richard Johnston Mcllwaine (born 16 March 1950) is an English former first-class cricketer.

Mcllwaine was born in the Milton area of Portsmouth in March 1950, where he was educated at Portsmouth Grammar School. A club cricketer for Waterlooville Cricket Club, he made his debut in first-class cricket for Hampshire against Northamptonshire at Bournemouth in the 1969 County Championship. Notably on debut, he shared in a partnership of 36 for the tenth wicket with Barry Richards, which helped Hampshire to avoid the follow-on. After making a further appearance that in season against Surrey, he went on to make two appearances in the 1970 County Championship against Sussex and Glamorgan. He scored 29 runs in his four matches, in addition to taking 4 wickets at an average of 68.25, with best figures of 2 for 40. Mcllwaine left Hampshire to pursue a career as a teacher, undertaking his teacher training by 1972.
