= The Portsmouth Grammar School =

Location
- High Street; Portsmouth, Hampshire, PO1 2JN; England; 50.791784°N 1.0998°W

Information
- Type: Private day school Grammar school
- Motto: Praemia Virtutis Honores
- Established: 1732; 294 years ago
- Founder: William Smith
- Chairman of the Governors: Walther Cha
- Headmaster: Andrew Fisher
- Staff: 172
- Gender: Mixed
- Age: 2 to 18
- Houses: 4
- Colours: Red; Gold; Black
- Publication: The Portmuthian
- School hymn: All My Hope on God is Founded
- Former pupils: Old Portmuthians
- School blog (Archived): Portsmouth Point
- Website: http://www.pgs.org.uk/

The Portsmouth Grammar School (PGS) is a co-educational private day school in Portsmouth, England, located in the historic part of Portsmouth. It was founded in 1732 as a boys' school, and is located on Portsmouth High Street.

== History ==
In 1732, William Smith, a former Mayor of Portsmouth and previously the garrison physician, died and left his estate to Christ Church, Oxford. His will contained instructions to build a new school in Portsmouth and thus, The Portsmouth Grammar School was founded. The will of the founder is reflected to this day in that two Governors continue to be nominated by Christ Church. The school also retains its naval links, with the Second Sea Lord nominating one further Governor. In 1926, the school moved from its Victorian premises to Cambridge Barracks. The school was hit by bombs during the Second World War.

In 1976, with the removal of the Direct Grant, it stopped being a grammar school under the Tripartite System, though it kept the term as part of its name and at the same time began to accept female pupils. The school colours are red, black and gold, and the school motto is Praemia Virtutis Honores (English: Honours are the rewards of virtue). The current Headmaster is Mr David Wickes, replacing Dr Anne Cotton. The school spent £6 million on a new Science building in 2011.

== Academic performance ==
In 2004, the school came 67 out of 100 in a Guardian list of Top independent schools' UCAS scores, There was an average AS/A level point score of 939.1 in 2009. In 2026, the school ranked as the joint 179th best independent school in England in The Times' table of Best Private Schools. This was based off A level and GCSE performance for the 2025 academic year. In that year at A level, 60.5% of the grades achieved were A*/A. At GCSE, 62.8% of achieved grades were 7,8, and 9s.

== Internal structure ==
The Portsmouth Grammar School consists of three sections: Nursery (ages 2–4), Junior School (Reception to Year 6), and Senior School (Year 7 to Sixth Form). The Upper Junior School (Years 5–6) is situated in the original Victorian building which once contained the whole Grammar School. The Nursery, Lower Junior School (Reception to Year 4), Middle School, and Upper School are located across the road on the High Street.

=== Houses ===
There are four houses in each section of PGS. Each house is represented by a colour and named after a former schoolmaster. Although these colours remain the same, the names change in each section of the School:

Junior School	Middle School	Upper School	Colour
Hudson	Barton	Grant	Blue
Jerrard	Eastwood	Latter	Yellow
Nicol	Hawkey	Smith	Red
Privett	Summers	Whitcombe	Green

Houses form the basis of the school pastoral system and provide a continued 'home' throughout a pupil's time at the school. In the Upper School, each house has its own common room. Sixth Formers have their own common area and cafe, known as the Sixth Form Centre; they also have their own library.

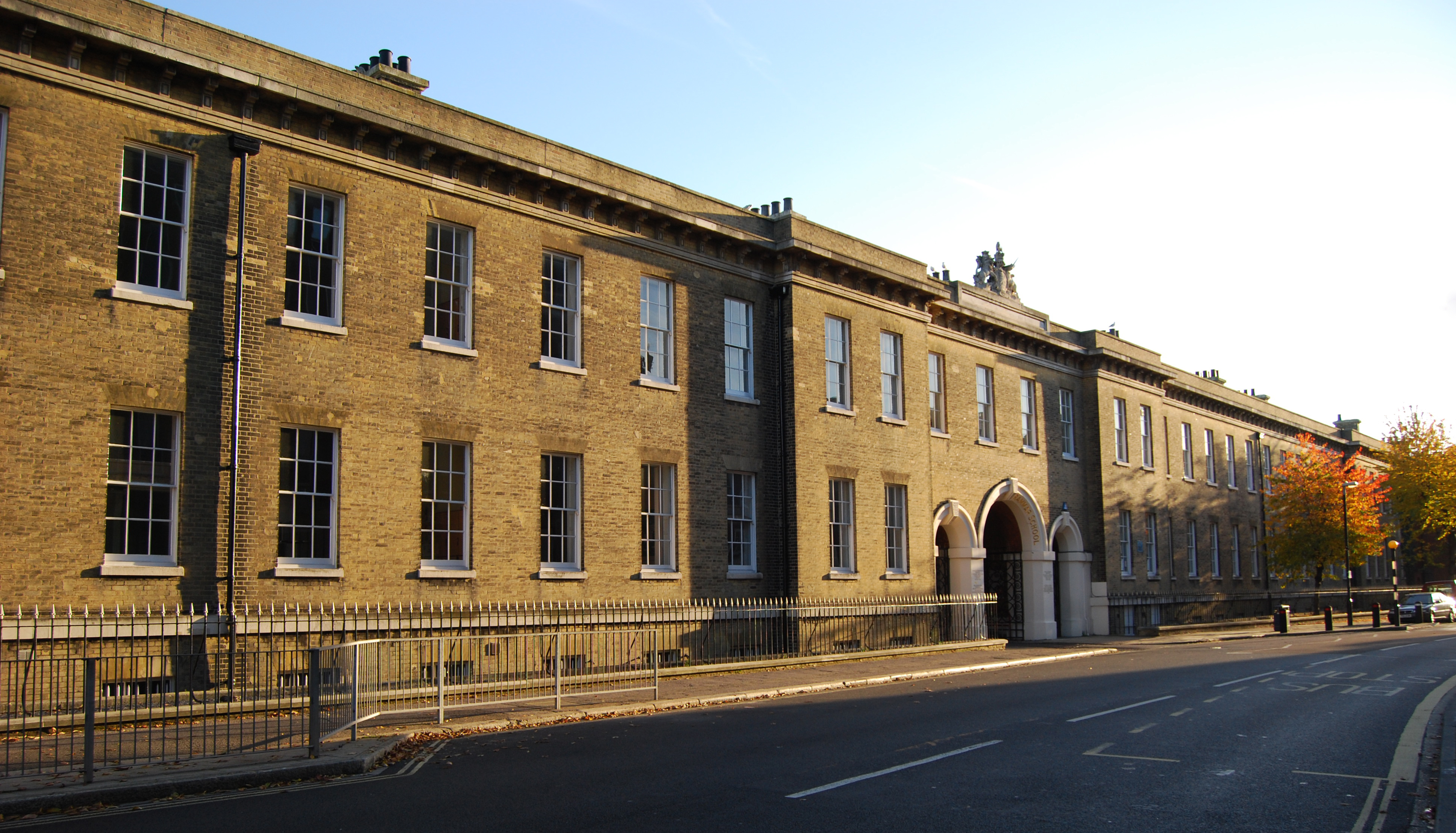
Frontispiece of The Portsmouth Grammar School

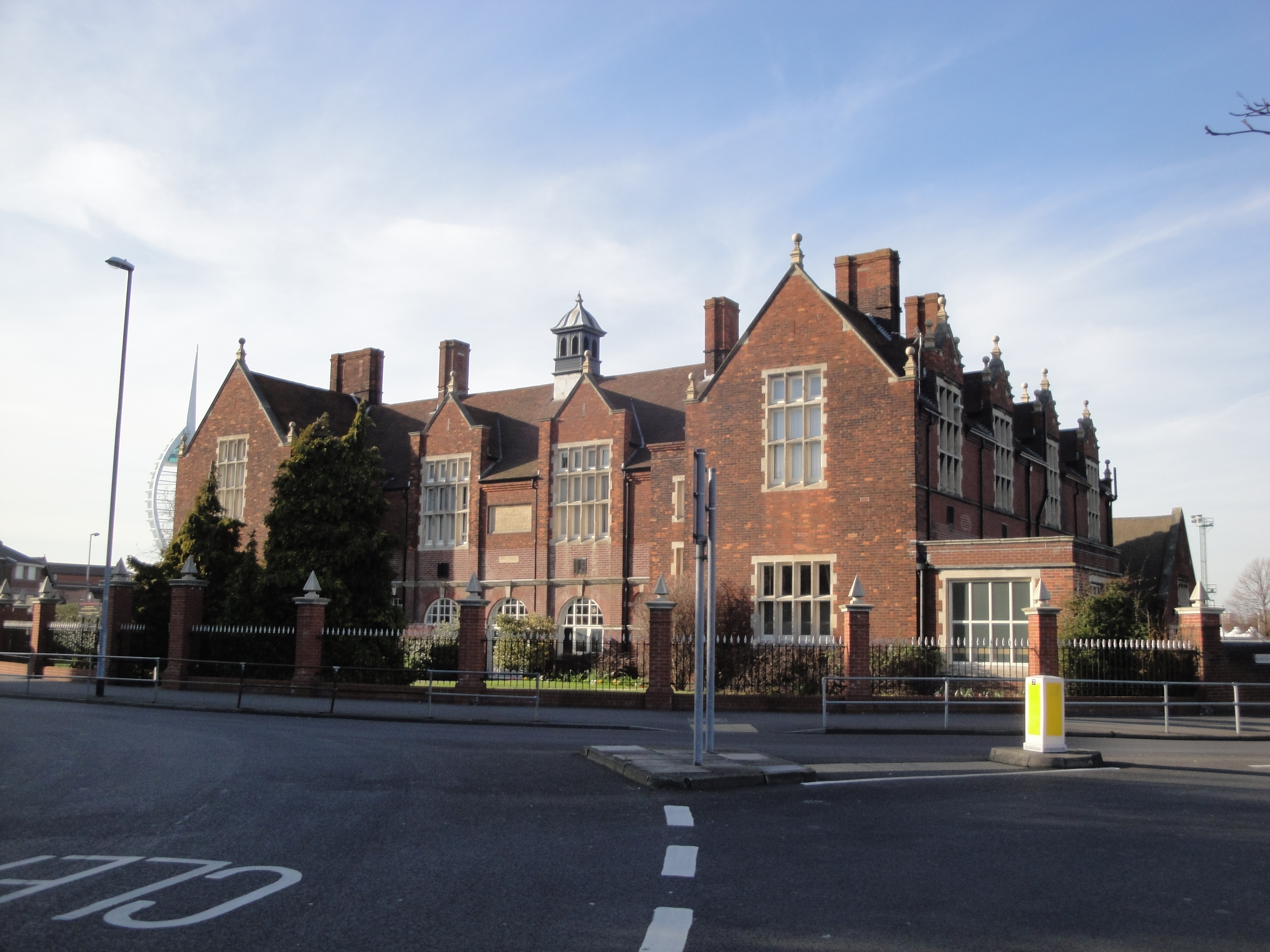
The old Grammar School building now houses the Upper Junior School

== Co-curricular activities ==
Pupils take part in trips each term to visit various countries. Pupils have visited France, Germany, Spain, Ireland, the United States, Syria, Russia, Norway, Hungary, Uganda and several other countries. Exchanges take place as a part of the Modern Foreign Languages programme each year, with pupils spending time in France, Spain, or Germany and receiving a visit from their counterparts. Additionally, sports teams travel each year to various locations, which have included South Africa and Australia.

Aside from trips abroad, extracurricular activities include the Combined Cadet Force, Model United Nations, a Debating Club, Wildlife Club, "Stock Market Club", "Model Rockets", and "Middle School Textiles Club".

The school was involved in the establishment of the education charity United World Schools and since 2010 has funded a Partner School in Cambodia through co-curricular activities.

=== Sport ===
Within the school grounds is a sports centre containing a multi-purpose hall, gymnasium, squash courts, weight lifting room, and dance rooms. The school has off-site sports grounds at Hilsea, which include various pitches as well as a pavilion. The school frequently uses the HMS Temeraire grounds for rugby and hockey during the winter season, as well as Governors Green in Portsmouth for other activities.

=== CCF ===
The school has a Combined Cadet Force open to pupils in Year 9 and above, which has Army, Royal Air Force, and Royal Navy sections.

=== Music ===
In an article in the September 2006 BBC Music Magazine, the following was written about the music at PGS:

At Portsmouth Grammar School, the musical opportunities put those of other, better known establishments to shame. With its own composer in residence...Links with the London Mozart Players mean that scholars get the chance to perform a concerto with a professional ensemble... Commissions for the school include works by Sally Beamish, Lynne Plowman, and Sir Peter Maxwell Davies.

There are several ensembles that perform regularly, many conducted by the school's associate conductor, Nicolae Moldoveanu. The PGS Chamber Choir sang at the Festival of Remembrance at the Royal Albert Hall in 2005 and went on tour to Salzburg at Christmas 2006. The Choir also sings regularly with the London Mozart Players and upholds an annual tradition of singing Evensong at Christ Church, Oxford.

=== Politics ===
The school has run mock elections for notable elections that have occurred at the time. In 2010, the History & Politics Department organised school elections for the 2010 UK election, where the school narrowly elected the Conservative Party, whilst in the 2012 US election the school voted in favour of the Democrats.

== Old Portmuthians ==
Alumni are known as Old Portmuthians and may join The Old Portmuthian Club, founded in 1885. Notable OPs include:

- William Nickerson VC (1875–1954), physician and soldier.
- Wally Hammond (1903–1965), captain of the England cricket team.
- G. E. L. Owen (1922–1982), classicist and philosopher.
- James Clavell (1924–1994), novelist, director and, notably, the screenwriter of 1963 film, The Great Escape.
- Sir Peter Viggers (1938–2020), Conservative MP for Gosport (1974–2010), gained national attention during the parliamentary expenses scandal for claiming £1,645 on a duck house at his constituency home.
- Fred Dinenage (1942–), presenter of ITV's local news programme, Meridian Tonight
- Paul Jones (1942–), singer with Manfred Mann (1962–1966) and presenter of The Blues Show on BBC Radio 2 (1986–2018)
- Ian Osterloh (1960–), clinical researcher attributed with the creation of 'Viagra' as well as numerous cardiovascular drugs
- Mel Stride (1961–), Conservative MP for Central Devon (2010–present), current Shadow Chancellor of the Exchequer (2024–present) and former Secretary of State for Work and Pensions (2022–2024)
- Jock Clear (1963–), senior performance engineer working for Scuderia Ferrari in Formula One racing and former race engineer for Lewis Hamilton (2013–14). He is now the driver coach for Charles Leclerc.
- Ed Richards (1965–), Chief Executive of Ofcom and former special adviser to Prime Ministers Tony Blair and Gordon Brown
- Roger Black (1966–), Olympic athlete (silver medalist)
- Murray Gold (1969–), TV, film and stage composer, whose work notably includes Doctor Who, since 2005
- James Bobin (1972–), film director, writer and producer; directed the high-grossing 2011 film, The Muppets and its 2014 sequel
- Rick Edwards (1979-), television personality, journalist, author and host of Impossible
- Mike Wozniak (1979–), comedian, actor and host of Junior Taskmaster
- Ant Middleton (1981–), former special forces soldier, writer, political and television personality and former host of SAS: Who Dares Wins
- Isaac Waddington (1999–), singer, pianist and finalist on the ninth series of Britain's Got Talent
- Charlie Dean (2000–), professional English cricketer for the England women's cricket team

== See also ==
- List of English and Welsh endowed schools (19th century)
