= Tool Academy season 1 =

Tool Academy
- Season 1
- No. of episodes: 9

Release
- Original network: VH1
- Original release: January 11 – March 15, 2009

Season chronology
- Next → Season 2

Tool Academy (season 1) is the first season of the VH1 reality television series Tool Academy. Tool Academy is a competitive reality television show featuring nine "unsuspecting bad boys" who have been sent to "relationship boot camp". The nine men, all of whom have been nominated by their respective girlfriends, initially think they are taking part in a competition for the title of "Mr. Awesome." However, shortly after arriving they find out the truth: they are actually being entered into a "charm school" which focuses on teaching them how to behave as boyfriends. Each week, one contestant is eliminated and his girlfriend must choose whether or not to stay with him. The last contestant remaining will win a $100,000 prize and the title of "Mr. Awesome." Relationship counselor Trina Dolenz helps the contestants with their relationship problems and decides who is expelled.

The winner of the first season was Josh, who proposed to Ashley after winning the competition, and they got married directly after the graduation ceremony.

A casting call for a second season was announced at the end of the reunion show.

== Lesson of the Weeks ==
Badges

1. Communication
2. Fidelity
3. Humility
4. Maturity
5. Trust
6. Romance
7. Family Values
8. Commitment

== Contestants ==
Contestants
Name	Tool Name	Girlfriend	Result
Josh (Joshua) Douglas	Tiny Tool	Ashley Pellegrino	Winner in final episode
Matsuflex (Ryan Matsunaga)	Naked Tool	Jenna	Runner Up in final episode
Shawn	Loud Mouth Tool	Aida^{[a]}	Eliminated in episode 7
Tommy Houlihan	Slacker Tool	Krista Grubb	Eliminated in episode 6
Rob (Robert)	Power Tool	Karine	Withdrew in episode 5^{[w]}
M.E.G.A. (Joshua)	Playa Pimpin' Tool	Margo	Eliminated in episode 4
Celebrity (Clarence)	Party Tool	Cameron	Eliminated in episode 3
Joey	Cold-Hearted Tool	Ashley	Eliminated in episode 2
Dimitri	Greek Tool	Jill	Eliminated in episode 1

^[a] Shawn started the show with Jaimee Grubbs as his girlfriend. However, on episode 2, she was replaced by Aida, his girlfriend of the past six years.
^[w] Rob withdrew from the competition after being medically treated for anxiety over the lie detector challenge.

== Episode Progress ==
#	Contestants	Episodes							
#	Contestants	1	2	3	4	5	6	7^{[l]}	8
1	Josh	SAFE	SAFE	RISK	SAFE	WIN	HIGH	SAFE	WINNER
2	Matsuflex^{[r]}	WIN	WIN	SAFE	SAFE	SAFE	RISK	SAFE	OUT
3	Shawn	SAFE	RISK	WIN	RISK	RISK	SAFE	OUT	
4	Tommy	RISK	HIGH	SAFE	SAFE	RISK	OUT^{[t]}		
5	Rob	RISK	SAFE	SAFE	SAFE	QUIT			
6	M.E.G.A.	SAFE	SAFE	SAFE	OUT^{[e]}				
7	Celebrity^{[d]}	SAFE	RISK	OUT					
8	Joey	SAFE	OUT						
9	Dimitri	OUT							

The contestant won Tool Academy and the title "Mr. Awesome"
The contestant won a challenge and won a date with his girlfriend.
The contestant was safe from being eliminated.
The contestant was at risk of being eliminated.
The contestant was eliminated and his girlfriend decided to stay with him.
The contestant was eliminated and his girlfriend decided to leave him.
The contestant withdrew from the competition.
^{^[d]} Clarence (Celebrity) dropped his nickname for episode 2.
^{^[e]} M.E.G.A. won the challenge, but was stated to be eliminated because of his girlfriend.
^{^[t]} Tommy won the challenge, but was eliminated.
^{^[l]} In episode 7, there was no challenge winner.
^{^[r]} Ryan (Matsuflex) dropped his nickname during the final exam.

== Episodes ==
=== Mr Awesome ===
First aired January 11, 2009

- Lesson of the Week: Communication
- Challenge: The girlfriends assemble a bed with the boyfriends reading/giving the instructions.
- Challenge Reward: A private date
- Challenge Winner: Matsuflex and Jenna
- Bottom Three: Dimitri, Rob, Tommy
- Eliminated: Dimitri (Jill decided to stay with Dimitri)

=== Fidelity Challenge ===
First aired January 18, 2009

- Lesson of the Week: Fidelity
- Challenge: A tango dance competition after receiving dance lessons. The couples were judged on their ability to "reconnect"
- Challenge Reward: Conjugal visit.
- Challenge Winner: Matsuflex and Jenna
- Bottom Three: Celebrity, Joey, Shawn
- Eliminated: Joey (Ashley L. decided to stay with Joey)

=== Epic Meltdown of Tools ===
First aired January 25, 2009

- Lesson of the Week: Humility
- Challenge: Dress in humiliating outfits and sell cookies to tourists at Universal Studios Hollywood
- Challenge Reward: Carriage Ride and Conjugal visit
- Challenge Winner: Shawn and Aida
- Bottom Two: Josh and Celebrity
- Eliminated: Celebrity (Cameron decided to leave Celebrity)

=== Husband Material ===
First aired February 1, 2009

- Lesson of the Week: Maturity
- Challenge: Knock-down a mastodon with a spear, gather water, and build a shelter
- Challenge Reward: Picnic Date
- Challenge Winner: M.E.G.A. and Margo
- Bottom Two: Shawn and M.E.G.A.
- Eliminated: M.E.G.A. (Margo decided to stay with M.E.G.A.)

=== Episode 5 ===
First aired February 8, 2009

- Lesson of the Week: Trust
- Challenge: Stay Alive or Stay Dead
- Challenge Reward: A date with their girlfriend in a limo and a Conjugal visit
- Challenge Winner: Matsuflex and Jenna
- Bottom Two: Shawn and Tommy (neither were expelled)
- Withdrew: Rob (Karine decided to stay with Rob)

=== Most Romantic Tool ===
First aired February 15, 2009

- Lesson of the Week: Romance
- Challenge: Hold a light heart ornament between their lips
- Challenge Reward: First pick of romantic dates
- Challenge Winner: Tommy and Krista
- Bottom Two: Matsuflex and Tommy
- Eliminated: Tommy (Krista decided to leave Tommy)

=== Family Values ===
First aired March 1, 2009

- Lesson of the Week: Family values
- Challenge: Take care of a piglet for a period of 24 hours
- Bottom: None, Shawn was called first and eliminated
- Eliminated: Shawn (Aida decided to stay with Shawn)

=== Two Tools Left ===
First aired March 8, 2009

- Lesson of the Week: Commitment
- Challenge: Paint a fence with the couples attached together
- Challenge Reward: A romantic dinner
- Challenge Winner: Josh and Ashley
- Runner-Up: Ryan "Matsuflex" Matsunaga (Jenna decided to stay with Matsuflex)
- Winner: Josh Douglas (Josh and Ashley got married)

=== Class Reunion ===
First aired March 15, 2009

The Tool Academy Class of 2009 is back to talk about their future relationships.

- Dimitri and Jill are still together.
- Celebrity and Cameron, who broke up after the show, are still separated.
- M.E.G.A went to the show alone. Margo did not appear due to family problems, the nature of which M.E.G.A. stated he was unaware of at the time of filming.
- Robert and Karine did not appear on the reunion.
- Tommy and Krista were back together for the reunion, but after failing a lie detector test to determine if he was cheating, Krista and Tommy fought and Krista left him again.
- Shawn admits to being a tool and is no longer with Aida or Jaimee.
- A surprise guest, Heather, appears on the show saying she's expecting Shawn's baby and is four months pregnant and does not want Shawn to be around her or the baby.
- Matsuflex's and Jenna's relationship has finally become sexual.
- Matsuflex states he is the man on the Tool Academy's banner.
- Matsuflex says he prefers "Matsuflex" over "Ryan" again.
- Josh and Ashley are still happily married.
- At the end of the show, the winning couple, Josh and Ashley, are awarded the $100,000 prize.
