= Jordan Murphy (American actor) =

American actor

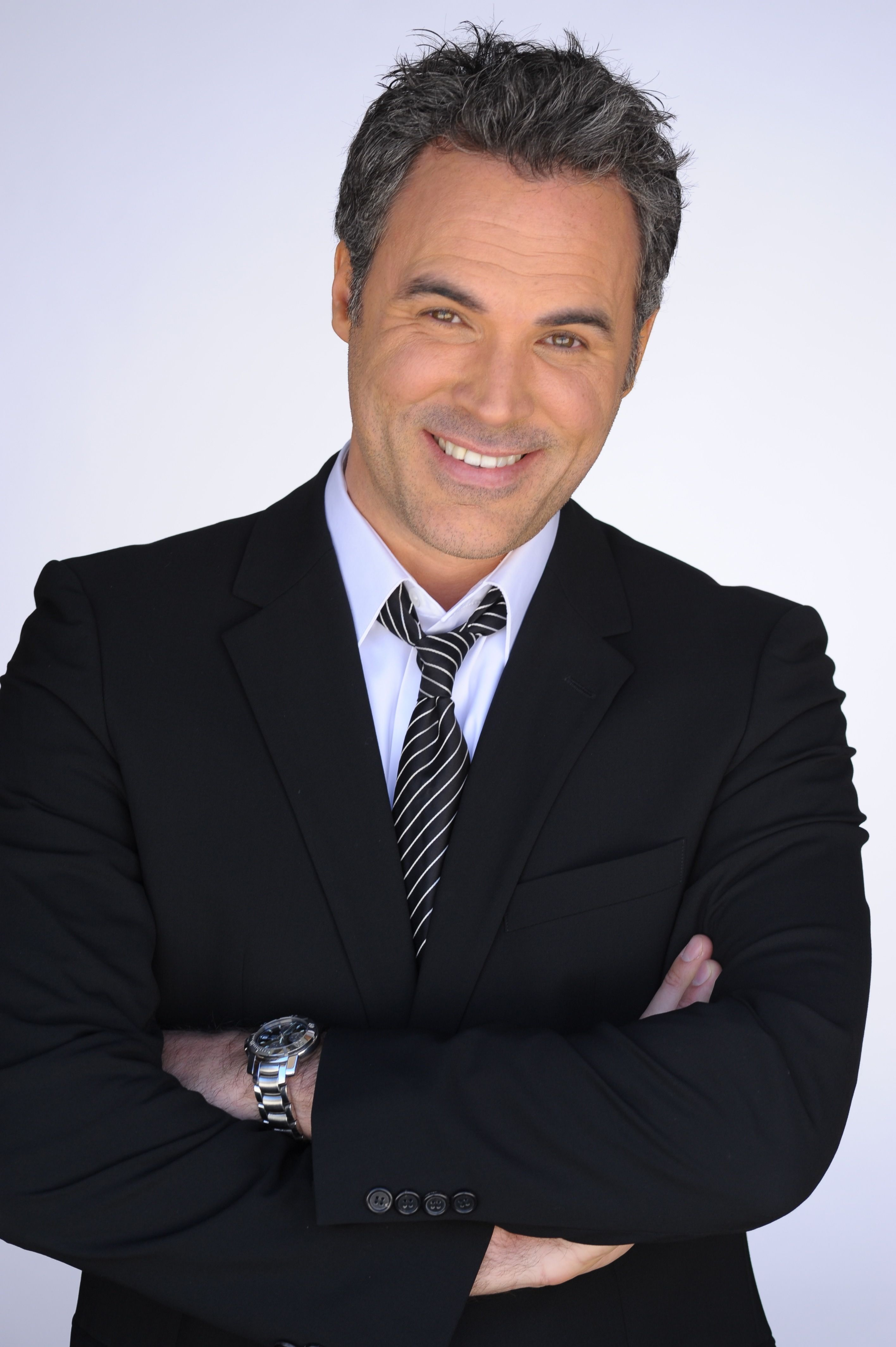
- Occupations: Actor, host, producer
- Years active: 1999–present
- Spouse: Dilyn Cassel (2002–present)

Jordan Murphy is an American actor, host, and producer. He has appeared in television advertising for Jardiance, TracFone, HomeAdvisor, and other products and services.

He is perhaps best known for presenting the American reality television series Tool Academy.

In October 2026, Murphy was announced as the host of the upcoming Unsolved Mysteries video podcast series expected to debut on YouTube on October 29, 2026.

== Filmography ==
=== Films ===
| Year | Title | Role | Notes |
|---|---|---|---|
| 1999 | Cowboys and Angels | Herbert the cowboy | short |
| 2001 | The Layover | Gary | short |
| 2002 | Redemption | Father David Michaels Diamonti | |
| 2004 | Party Animalz | Male Realtor | |
| 2005 | Another Part of Town | McMurphy's Bartender | short |
| 2007 | The Cure | FBI Agent | TV movie |
| 2007 | Judy's Got a Gun | Armed Man | TV movie |
| 2017 | Wedding Wonderland | Duncan Reynolds | TV movie |

=== Television ===
| Year | Title | Role | Notes |
|---|---|---|---|
| 2002 | Boston Public | Officer No. 2 | "Chapter Thirty-Four" (Season 2, Episode 14) |
| 2002–2005 | Before & After'noon Movies | Host | Host (120 episodes) |
| 2003–2004 | For Love or Money | Host | Host (4 seasons) |
| 2003 | Las Vegas | Mystique Manager | "Groundhog Summer" (Season 1, Episode 5) |
| 2005 | Charmed | Patron No. 1 | "Extreme Makeover World Edition" (Season 7, Episode 12) "Charmageddon" (Season 7, Episode 13) |
| 2005 | The Comeback | Macho Host | "Valerie Triumphs at the Upfronts" (Season 1, Episode 2) |
| 2006 | Scrubs | Robot Groom | "My Big Bird" (Season 5, Episode 8) |
| 2007 | Just Jordan | Coach | "The Goose, the Puffs and the Wardrobe" (Season 2, Episode 10) |
| 2008 | Las Vegas | Peter | "Secrets, Lies and Lamaze" (Season 5, Episode 14) |
| 2009–2010 | Tool Academy | Host | Host (26 episodes) |
| 2009 | Better Off Ted | Male Lawyer | "Trust and Consequence" (Season 1, Episode 10) |
| 2010 | Parenthood | Mr. Genatasio | "Namaste No More" (Season 1, Episode 10) |
| 2010 | CSI: Miami | Brandon Garrett | "Sleepless in Miami" (Season 9, Episode 5) |
| 2017 | Casualty | Nate Archer | "Back to School" (Season 31, Episode 18) |
| 2017 | Days of Our Lives | Sam | Episode 13144 |
| 2018 | Dirty John | Mutt | "Unapproachable Dreams" (Season 1, Episode 1) |
