= Unsolved Mysteries =

American true crime television series

- Genre: Documentary; Mystery; Paranormal
- Created by: John Cosgrove; Terry Dunn Meurer
- Presented by: Raymond Burr; Karl Malden; Robert Stack; Virginia Madsen; Dennis Farina
- Country of origin: United States
- Original language: English
- No. of seasons: 17
- No. of episodes: 611 (list of episodes)

Production
- Executive producers: John Cosgrove; Terry Dunn Meurer
- Producers: Raymond Bridgers; Stuart Schwartz; Jim Lindsay
- Running time: 42 minutes (1987–2010); 36–53 minutes (2020–present)
- Production companies: Dave Bell Associates (first two specials; 1987); Cosgrove-Meurer Productions (1987–present; starting with second special); FilmRise; Lifetime Productions (2001–2002); 21 Laps Entertainment (2020–present)

Original release
- Network: NBC
- Release: January 20, 1987 – August 8, 1997
- Network: CBS
- Release: November 13, 1997 – June 11, 1999
- Network: Lifetime
- Release: July 2, 2001 – September 20, 2002
- Network: Spike
- Release: October 13, 2008 – April 27, 2010
- Network: Netflix
- Release: July 1, 2020 – present

Unsolved Mysteries is an American mystery documentary television series, created by John Cosgrove and Terry Dunn Meurer. Documenting cold cases and paranormal phenomena, it began as a series of seven specials presented by Raymond Burr, Karl Malden, and Robert Stack, which aired on NBC beginning on January 20, 1987. It became a full-fledged series on October 5, 1988, hosted by Stack. After nine seasons on NBC, the series moved to CBS for its 10th season on November 13, 1997. After adding Virginia Madsen as a co-host during season 11 failed to boost slipping ratings, CBS canceled the series after only a two-season, 12-episode run, on June 11, 1999. The series was revived by Lifetime in 2000, with season 12 beginning on July 2, 2001. Unsolved Mysteries aired 103 episodes on Lifetime, before ending on September 20, 2002, an end that coincided with Stack's illness and eventual death.

After a six-year absence, the series was resurrected by Spike in 2007, and began airing on October 13, 2008. This new, revived version was hosted by Dennis Farina, who mainly tied together repackaged segments from the original episodes. Farina hosted 175 episodes before the series ended again on April 27, 2010. Cosgrove-Meurer Productions maintains a website for the show, featuring popular accounts and ongoing cold cases (murder or missing persons), with a link to an online form should a viewer have information on an unsolved crime.

In 2017, FilmRise acquired worldwide digital distribution rights to the series and announced its intent to release updated versions of its episodes. These shows are currently streaming on Amazon Prime, Tubi, and on its own dedicated channel on Pluto TV in the United States and the United Kingdom.

On January 18, 2019, Netflix picked up a reboot of the series which premiered on July 1, 2020. As of May 2025, five volumes of the reboot have been produced.

== Overview ==
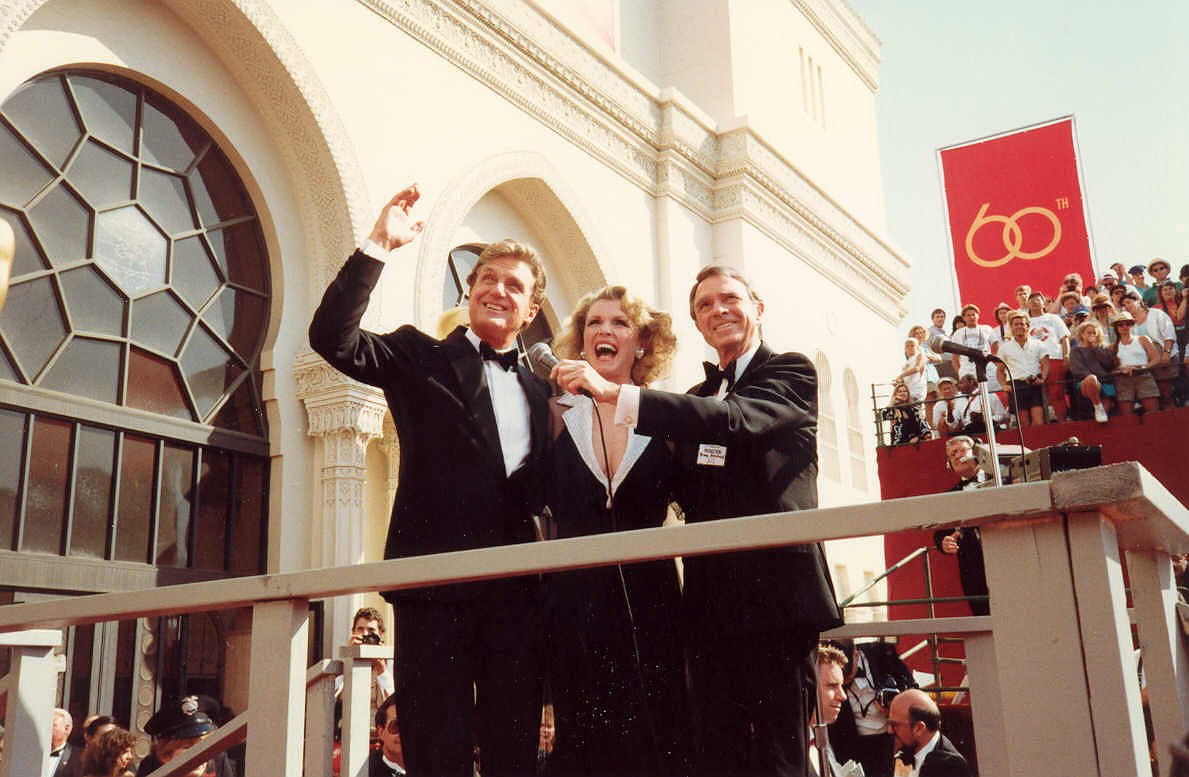
Host Robert Stack (left, waving) defined the tone of Unsolved Mysteries.

Unsolved Mysteries used a documentary format to profile real-life mysteries and featured re-enactments of unsolved crimes (both where a suspect was not identified, and where a suspect was identified but the suspect's whereabouts were not), missing persons cases, conspiracy theories and unexplained paranormal phenomena (alien abductions, ghosts, UFOs, and "secret history" theories).

The concept was created in a series of three specials produced by John Cosgrove and Terry-Dunn Meurer, which were pitched to NBC in 1985 and shown in 1986 with the title, "Missing... Have You Seen This Person?" The success of the specials led Cosgrove and Meurer to broaden the series to include mysteries of all kinds.

The pilot of what eventually became Unsolved Mysteries was a special that aired on NBC on January 20, 1987, with Raymond Burr as host/narrator. The series was initially produced by Dave Bell Associates for the first two specials before the creators Cosgrove and Meurer left Dave Bell to form its own company starting with the second special aired on May 25, 1987, and took the format with them. Throughout the 1987–88 television season, six more specials aired, the first two hosted by Karl Malden and the final four by Robert Stack. Because of the incorporation of paranormal mysteries, NBC News disowned the series when it aired on the network and required that a disclaimer air before each show to clarify that it was "not a news broadcast." (in the original special, it was "not a NBC News production", later changed "not a news broadcast or a news documentary." before simplified to "not a news broadcast." for the series)

In 1988, the show debuted as a weekly program on NBC. Ratings steadily dropped after the 1993–94 season. Until 2002, it was hosted by Stack. In its second season on CBS in 1999, Stack was joined by co-host Virginia Madsen. Episodes released between 1995 and 1997 featured journalist Keely Shaye Smith and television host Lu Hanessian as correspondents in the show's "phone center", where they provided updates on previous stories as information for "special bulletin" segments. A March 14, 1997, episode featured journalist Cathy Scott in the reenactment of rapper Tupac Shakur's 1996 unsolved murder. This broadcast was one week after the murder of Biggie Smalls. In 2002, the series was canceled by Lifetime. In 2008, television network Spike revived the series with Dennis Farina as its host; the Spike revival ended in 2010.

The show was known for its eerie theme song composed by Michael Boyd and Gary Remal Malkin, and for Stack's grim presence and ominous narration. The theme music was changed seven times, in 1993, 1995, 1997, 1999, 2001, 2008, and 2020. The 2020 version of the theme was arranged, performed, and recorded by West Dylan Thordson.

== Updates ==
Viewers were occasionally given updates on success stories, where suspects were brought to justice and loved ones were reunited.

The show itself has been credited for bringing increased attention to certain cases and thus allowing them to be solved. One episode featured a video of an arsonist filming an unidentified house being burned down while he was giving strange commentary. Once it had been featured on the show, viewers were able to identify the house involved, and two suspects were arrested.

== Broadcast history ==
=== NBC (1987–1997) ===
The show first aired on NBC from 1987 to 1997. The pilot episode was hosted by actor Raymond Burr. Karl Malden and Robert Stack were also hired to host further specials. When the series became a full-fledged television program in 1988, Stack became the full-time host. Unsolved Mysteries was also one of the few prime-time shows of its era to appeal to fans of the supernatural and used effective special effects to enhance tales of the unexplained. In 1992, NBC aired a short-lived dramatized court show spin-off program called Final Appeal: From the Files of Unsolved Mysteries, also hosted by Stack. The premise of this program was to try to give the unjustly accused a final appeal for help, with the debut episode taking an in-depth look at the Jeffrey MacDonald case. The program was canceled after only a few episodes due to poor ratings.

=== CBS (1997–1999) ===
The ratings for Unsolved Mysteries had been steadily declining ever since it was moved from its original Wednesday evening timeslot to Friday evenings in the fall of 1994. At the end of the 1996–97 season, it was canceled by NBC. Upon the cancelation from NBC, CBS picked up the series for a tenth season. The first episode aired in November 1997 as an Unsolved Mysteries special. When CBS canceled its Block Party line-up in the spring of 1998, the network moved the show to its Friday 9:00 pm timeslot. During the show's run on CBS, the series was limited to only six-episode seasons, and was airing only on a sporadic schedule. Reruns aired during the summer of 1998 with heavy promotion of the return of the NFL on CBS with the upcoming 1998 NFL season. When the series returned for its abbreviated 11th season in the spring of 1999, Stack was joined by actress Virginia Madsen for hosting duties in an attempt to boost its female audience. The effort failed, and CBS canceled the show soon afterwards. Later cable reruns of segments originally narrated by Madsen were re-dubbed with Stack's voice.

=== Lifetime (2001–2002) ===
Lifetime Television, which had been airing re-runs of the NBC episodes since the early 1990s, had ordered a two-season run of new episodes which began airing in 2001. Consisting of a mixture of new and old cases, these episodes were produced between 2001 and 2002, and usually aired on weekdays between 11 a.m. and 3 p.m. The program ceased producing new episodes when Stack was diagnosed with prostate cancer in late 2002. He died of heart failure in May 2003.

After Stack's death, old episodes continued to run in syndication on several television networks in the U.S., Canada, and Australia. During some shows, callers gave tips to the telecenter. When the show was in active production, a toll-free number was displayed on the bottom of the screen below the title logo at the end of each segment. When the show left active production following Stack's death and went into reruns, the number was removed and replaced with a P.O. box address.

=== Spike TV (2008–2010) ===
According to Broadcasting & Cable, in 2007, HBO Distribution announced plans to bring back Unsolved Mysteries when the cable channel Lifetime's contract expired in 2008. The show featured a new set, a new logo, new music, and updates on old cases. In addition, actor Dennis Farina became the new host, as Stack had died five years earlier. The show debuted on Spike on October 13, 2008.

This repackaged series run was criticized by fans for its presentation of past cases only, with no new case segments being produced. The existing segments were also edited to be shorter so the show could be expanded to present five cases in an hour rather than the four of the original series. Because the majority of the cases were now between 20 and 40 years old, the re-edited segments usually did not reference the years in which the events presented originally occurred. When updates for solved cases aired, Dennis Farina's voiceover would refer to cases "in a recent broadcast...", when the case may have already been solved during the show's original run or during the series' hiatus from 2002 onward. Unsolved Mysteries ended its run on Spike on April 27, 2010.

=== Netflix (2020–present) ===
A 12-part reboot was announced by Deadline Hollywood on January 18, 2019. The series is being "refreshed" by Stranger Things executive producer Shawn Levy and his company 21 Laps Entertainment along with Cosgrove-Meurer Productions and Netflix. Cosgrove and Meurer are showrunners for the series, with Levy and Josh Barry being executive producers. Robert Wise is a co-executive producer, along with showrunner Dunn Meurer. Each episode focuses on a single mystery. Cosgrove stated that the reboot would be "pure documentary style" and would have no host or narrator; however, an image of longtime host Robert Stack can be seen in the title sequence for each episode as an homage to his impact on the show. The first six episodes of the new season became available to stream starting July 1, 2020. In August 2020, it was reported that 13.7% of subscribers had watched the series over its first month. On September 1, 2021, Netflix formally announced that it had ordered an additional season of the series set to launch in the summer of 2022. On September 6, 2022, Netflix announced a third volume of nine new episodes, billed as a "three-night event", would begin streaming October 18, October 25, and November 1, 2022. Netflix announced in February 2024 that a fourth volume of episodes would air sometime that same year. On June 20, 2024, it was announced that the fourth volume would begin streaming on July 31, 2024. A fifth volume consisting of 4 episodes premiered in October 2024.

=== Unmasking the Tylenol Killer (2026) ===
The Roku Channel premiered Unsolved Mysteries' first-ever feature-length documentary, Unmasking the Tylenol Killer, on October 9, 2026. The 88-minute film details the resolution of the Boise, Idaho cold case of the "Unknown Wanderer" (identified as Dr. Mathew Francis Betkouski in September 2026), which was featured on a 1990 episode of the show, and explores a possible connection to the unsolved 1982 Chicago Tylenol murders.

=== Video podcast (2026–present) ===
A new Unsolved Mysteries video podcast, hosted by Jordan Murphy, is expected to debut on October 29, 2026 on YouTube. New weekly episodes will be released Thursdays, with updates to cases previously profiled on the television show and previous podcast series every Tuesday.

== Episodes ==
Season	Episodes	Originally released		
Season	Episodes	First released	Last released	Network
Specials	7	January 20, 1987	May 18, 1988	NBC
1	28	October 5, 1988	September 13, 1989	NBC
2	31	September 20, 1989	September 12, 1990	NBC
3	33	September 19, 1990	September 11, 1991	NBC
4	37	September 18, 1991	September 9, 1992	NBC
5	35	September 16, 1992	September 15, 1993	NBC
6	33	September 22, 1993	September 18, 1994	NBC
7	30	September 25, 1994	August 30, 1995	NBC
8	30	October 20, 1995	September 13, 1996	NBC
9	27	September 20, 1996	August 8, 1997	NBC
10	6	November 13, 1997	May 29, 1998	CBS
11	6	April 2, 1999	June 11, 1999	CBS
12	55	July 2, 2001	April 29, 2002	Lifetime
13	48	June 10, 2002	September 20, 2002	Lifetime
14	175	October 13, 2008	April 27, 2010	Spike
15	12	July 1, 2020	October 19, 2020	Netflix
16	9	October 18, 2022	November 1, 2022	Netflix
17	9	July 31, 2024	October 2, 2024	Netflix
Unmasking the Tylenol Killer		October 9, 2026		The Roku Channel

== Notable actors and celebrities ==
Famous actors and celebrities have appeared on the show, both as role actors (before finding stardom) and also in episodes where they had a connection with the events being portrayed.

=== As re-enactor ===
In 1992, Unsolved Mysteries filmed in Texas and cast Matthew McConaughey to play a murder victim. This was one of McConaughey's earliest on-screen roles. Cheryl Hines, Stephnie Weir, Bill Moseley, Ned Bellamy, Scott Wilkinson, Daniel Dae Kim, David Ramsey, Diane Franklin, Steve Reevis, Donna Mitchell and Taran Killam also appeared on the program before receiving more notable work in Hollywood. Hill Harper also appeared in an episode about a woman looking for a childhood friend whom she later discovered was indeed her sister.

=== Connection with case ===
- Comedian Blake Clark was interviewed in the "Comedy Store Ghosts" episode.
- Author James Ellroy appeared in an episode looking for the man who murdered his mother.
- Football player Reggie White appeared in an episode trying to find the arsonists who set fire to his church.
- Musical group New Kids on the Block appear in an episode about the disappearance of the teenager Kari Lynn Nixon; a girl resembling her was seen at one of their concerts.
- Musician Henry Rollins and actor Dennis Cole both appeared to find the people responsible for the murder of Cole's son, Joe.
- Musician Ron Bushy appeared in a story about the disappearance of fellow Iron Butterfly bandmate, Philip Taylor Kramer.
- Musician Jon Bon Jovi was interviewed about the death of his personal manager's daughter, Katherine Korzilius.

== U.S. television ratings and awards ==
Seasonal rankings (based on average total viewers per episode) of Unsolved Mysteries.

Note: U.S. network television seasons generally start in late September and end in late May, which coincides with the completion of May sweeps.

The figure reflected starting with the 1988–89 season and ending with the 1996–97 season represents the total number of households viewing the program. Starting with the 1997–98 season, the viewing figure is based on total number of viewers.

Season	TV season	Rank	Viewers (in millions)
1	1988–89	#17	15.7
2	1989–90	#11	16.6
3	1990–91	#16	14.6
4	1991–92	#13	15.2
5	1992–93	#21	13.2
6	1993–94	#36	12.0
7	1994–95	#75	9.0
8	1995–96	#59	9.4
9	1996–97	#53	8.6
10	1997–98	#86	9.9
11	1998–99	#75	9.7

The original NBC telecast was nominated six times for an Emmy Award for outstanding informational series in 1989–1993 and 1995. The series won the American Society of Composers, Authors, and Publishers Award for Top TV Series twice, in 1992 and 1993; both times, the recipients were Michael Boyd and Gary Malkin for their work on the show's music theme.

== Home media ==
First Look Studios released six theme-based DVD sets in Region 1 in 2004/2005. The sets were re-released on June 21, 2005, with a lower suggested retail price. On March 21, 2006, a compilation set called The Best of Unsolved Mysteries was released, which contained selected segments from each of the earlier DVD sets along with some previously unreleased-on-DVD content. A special boxed set featuring the first six sets along with the new content from the Best of collection was also produced.

DVD name	No. of ep. #	Release date
UFOs	26	September 7, 2004
Ghosts	34	September 14, 2004
Treasures & Ghosts	10	September 14, 2004
Miracles	33	October 26, 2004
Incredible Psychics	28	January 25, 2005
Bizarre Murders	32	January 25, 2005
Strange Legends	27	February 15, 2005
The Best of Unsolved Mysteries	33	March 21, 2006
Unsolved Mysteries: The Ultimate Collection	190	April 25, 2006

== Soundtrack ==
In 2018, Terror Vision Records made a deal with program creator John Cosgrove to release the show's official score on vinyl, Unsolved Mysteries: Ghosts/Hauntings/The Unexplained. Two sets on color vinyl were released on June 22, 2018 – the first, a three vinyl set collecting the scores written for each of the show's ghost and missing/wanted segments along with three theme songs; the second, a 34 tracks single vinyl collection featuring the best cuts off the first three vinyl set. Segment cues were taken from the show's original DAT tapes. A second collection entitled Unsolved Mysteries Volume Two: Bizarre Murders/UFOs/The Unknown was released in December 2019.

== Podcast ==
On October 21, 2020, it was announced that Cosgrove/Meurer Productions had struck a deal with Entercom-owned Cadence13 for an official Unsolved Mysteries weekly podcast. The podcast is narrated by voice-over artist Steve French.

== Documentary ==
A 35th anniversary documentary special titled Unsolved Mysteries: Behind the Legacy was formally announced on September 7, 2023. The documentary, produced by FilmRise, hit Alamo Theaters nationwide on October 4, 2023. The AVOD premiere took place the following day, October 5.

== Spin-offs ==
- On September 18, 1992, NBC debuted a short-lived 6-episode spin-off series, hosted by Robert Stack himself, titled Final Appeal: From the Files of Unsolved Mysteries.
- In 1993, NBC aired a two-hour primetime movie called Victim of Love: The Shannon Mohr Story.
- On January 23, 1995, NBC aired a two-hour primetime movie called Escape from Terror: The Teresa Stamper Story.
- On April 22, 1996, NBC aired a two-hour primetime movie special titled, From the Files of Unsolved Mysteries: Voice from the Grave.
- On April 28, 1997, NBC aired a new primetime movie called From the Files of Unsolved Mysteries: The Sleepwalker Killing.

== See also ==
- Aktenzeichen XY… ungelöst
- Disappeared, a similar program about unsolved missing people cases
- Corrupt Crimes
- Unsealed Files
- Traffic Cops (also called Car Wars)
- America's Most Wanted, a similar program
- Fugitive Watch, a similar program
- India's Most Wanted, an inspired program in India
- Police Report, a similar program in Hong Kong
- Linha Direta, a similar program in Brazil
- Efterlyst, a similar program in Sweden
- Crimecall, a similar program in Ireland
- Crime Watch, a similar program in Trinidad and Tobago
- Police 5, a similar program on ITV
- Crime Watch Daily, a similar syndicated program hosted by Chris Hansen
- Crimewatch, a similar program in the United Kingdom.
- Ten 7 Aotearoa, a similar program in New Zealand.
- The Hunt with John Walsh, a similar program
- BuzzFeed Unsolved
