= Robert Gibson (cricketer, born 1994) =

English cricketer

Personal information
- Full name: Robert Andrew Max Gibson
- Born: 11 March 1994 (age 32); Emsworth, Hampshire, England
- Batting: Right-handed
- Bowling: Leg break

Domestic team information
- Years: Team
- 2015–2016: Leeds/Bradford MCCU

Career statistics
| Competition | First-class |
|---|---|
| Matches | 4 |
| Runs scored | 158 |
| Batting average | 39.50 |
| 100s/50s | –/1 |
| Top score | 64* |
| Catches/stumpings | 1/– |
- Source: Cricinfo, 8 August 2020

Robert Andrew Max Gibson (born 11 March 1994) is an English former first-class cricketer.

Gibson was born in March 1994 at Emsworth, Hampshire. He was educated at Portsmouth Grammar School, before going up to Durham University. While studying at Durham, he made four appearances in first-class cricket for Durham MCCU, making two appearances each in 2015 and 2016. He scored 158 runs in his four matches, at an average of 39.50 and a high score of 64 not out, which was his only half century and came against Gloucestershire in 2016.
