= Jock Clear =

English senior performance engineer (born 1963)

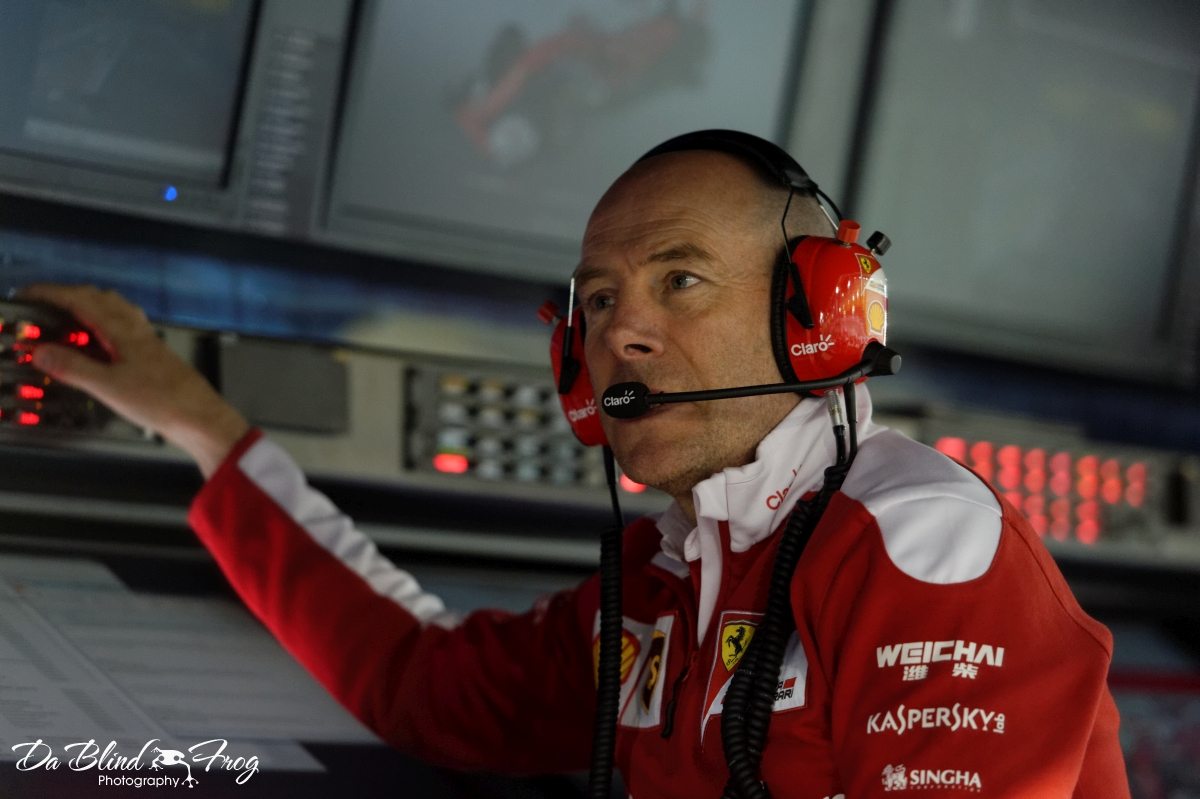
- Clear in 2016

Personal information
- Born: 12 September 1963 (age 61); Portsmouth, Hampshire, United Kingdom

Sport
- Sport: Formula One
- Team: Scuderia Ferrari

Jock Clear (born 12 September 1963) is an English senior performance engineer working for Scuderia Ferrari, where he is currently the driver coach for Charles Leclerc, alongside Calum MacDonald as Senior Driver Performance Engineer. Before moving to Ferrari, he worked at Mercedes, where he was the performance engineer for Lewis Hamilton (2013–14) and Michael Schumacher (2011–12). He was also the race engineer for Nico Rosberg (2010–2011), Rubens Barrichello (2006–2009), Takuma Sato (2003–2005), Jacques Villeneuve (1996–2003), David Coulthard (1995) and Johnny Herbert (1994).

== Early life ==
Born in Portsmouth, Hampshire, Clear attended The Portsmouth Grammar School and graduated in 1987 with a degree in mechanical engineering from Heriot-Watt University, Edinburgh.

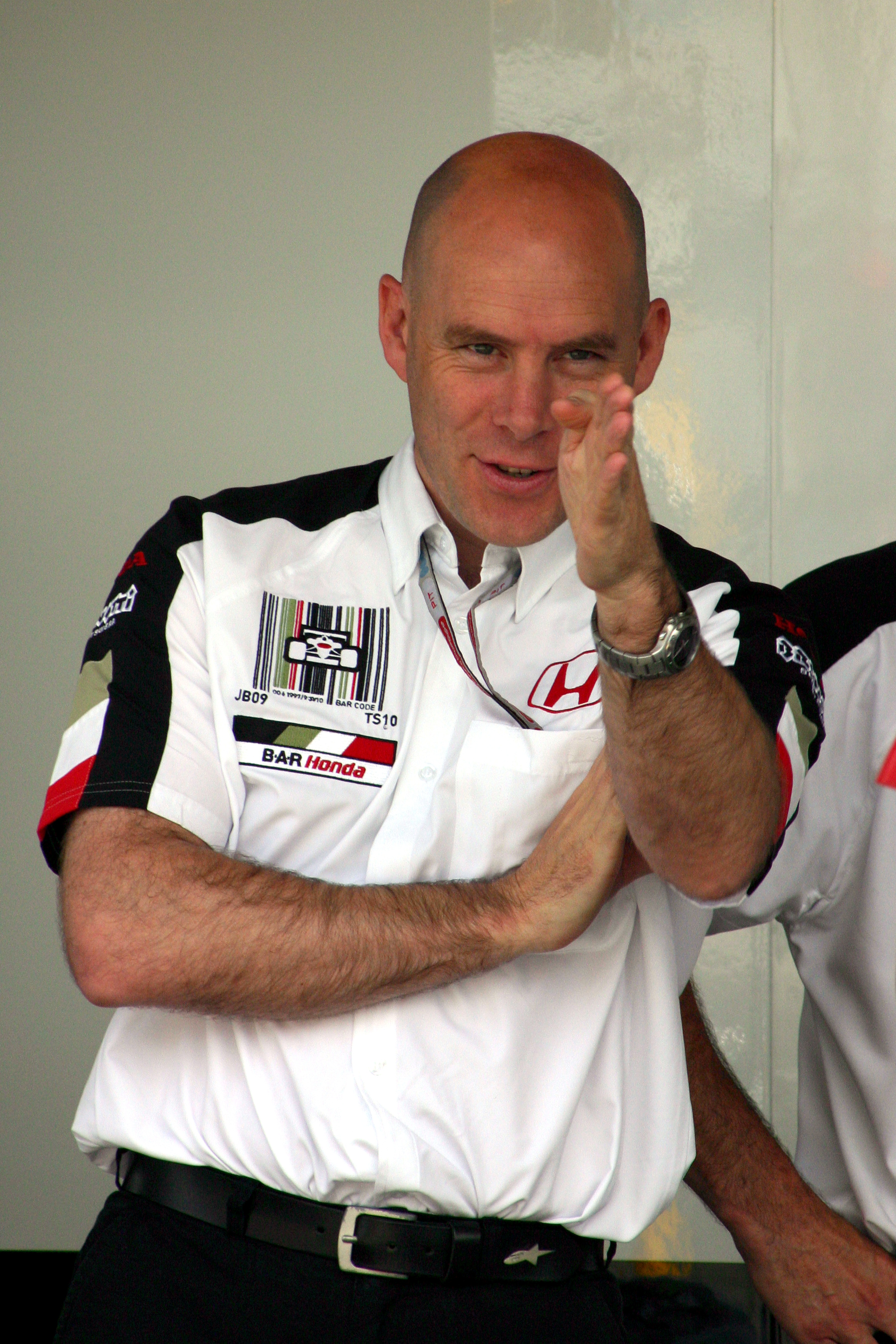
Jock Clear with British American Racing at the 2004 US Grand Prix

While a student at Heriot-Watt, Clear was stand-off for the University's 1st XV rugby team.

== Career ==
His career in motorsport began at Lola Cars, where he worked as a design engineer before moving to the position of head of composite design at Benetton Formula in 1989. In 1992 he worked as senior designer at Leyton House Racing, then joined Team Lotus where he became Johnny Herbert's race engineer in 1994. When Lotus collapsed at the end of the year, he transferred to Williams F1 and engineered David Coulthard, who won his first Grand Prix in Portugal and finished third in the drivers' championship.

Jacques Villeneuve joined Williams in 1996 and Clear was his race engineer; the Canadian won the world championship the following year under Clear's guidance. When Villeneuve moved to British American Racing for the 1999 season, his engineer followed suit. The relationship continued until the 2003 Japanese Grand Prix, when Villeneuve walked out on the eve of the race. Takuma Sato took up the vacant seat and drove to sixth position on his racing debut with the team. Clear worked with Sato again in 2004–2005 and then with Rubens Barrichello from 2006 to 2009. After the team became Brawn GP in 2009, Barrichello won the European and Italian Grands Prix and finished in third place in the World Championship.

In November 2007, Clear was awarded an Honorary Doctorate of Engineering by Heriot-Watt University "in recognition of his outstanding success in applying engineering science in the most demanding and competitive environments and as a role model to young engineers."

In December 2014, it was announced that Clear had been signed by Ferrari, and would move to the team for the 2015 Formula One season.
