= Gertrud Osterloh =

Gertrud Osterloh (born in Lübeck on 18 May 1910; died in Wentorf bei Hamburg 25 October 2012) was the first woman to head the German Evangelical Church Assembly. Her father, Edo Osterloh, was a noted theologian and Christian Democratic Union of Germany politician.
