= Nowatske v. Osterloh =

Medical malpractice case in Wisconsin

- Court: Wisconsin Court of Appeals
- Full case name: Kim Nowatske and Julie Nowatske, Plaintiffs-Appellants, v. Mark D. Osterloh, M.D., The Medical Protective Company and Wisconsin Patients Compensation Fund, Defendants-Respondents.
- Decided: April 3, 1996
- Citation: 201 Wis.2d 497, 549 N.W.2d 256 (Wis. App. 1996)

Case history
- Prior actions: Nowatske v. Osterloh, 198 Wis.2d 419, 543 N.W.2d 265 (1996) (Wisconsin Supreme Court decision on certified question)

Nowatske v. Osterloh, 198 Wis.2d 419, 543 N.W.2d 265 (Wis. 1996), on remand, 201 Wis.2d 497, 549 N.W.2d 256 (Wis. App. 1996), is a case relating to the law of medical malpractice in Wisconsin.

== Factual background and procedural history ==
The plaintiff, Kim Nowatske underwent retinal reattachment surgery in his right eye in 1989. After the surgery, Nowatske could not see out of the eye in question. During routine post-operative testing, defendant surgeon used his finger (instead of a tonometer) to measure the pressure inside Nowatske's eye and, noting a normal "back-off" response to light, did not specifically ask the patient whether he could see in his right eye or not. The patient thought the inability to see was a normal consequence of the surgery. After the patient was discharged, he experienced severe pain; the surgeon, learning that the patient did not receive the pain medication prescribed, called in a prescription to a local pharmacy without inquiring further of the patient regarding the pain. The next day, Nowatske was examined by the surgeon and learned that the blindness in the right eye was permanent. In 1991, he and his wife sued the surgeon, and the case went to trial. A jury determined that the surgeon was not negligent, and the plaintiff appealed.

== Issues on appeal ==
On appeal, the plaintiff argued:

- that the pattern jury instructions regarding the law of medical malpractice were erroneous,
- that the trial court erroneously allowed the defense attorney to ask improper questions to impeach the plaintiff's expert during cross-examination,
- that the trial court erred in allowing the defendant to point an ophthalmoscope at members of the jury during his testimony in his own defense, and
- that the evidence was insufficient to support the verdict.

== Results ==
The Wisconsin Court of Appeals certified the first three legal questions to the Wisconsin Supreme Court. The state supreme court agreed to consider only the question of whether the pattern jury instructions were correct or not, and held that the jury instructions contained no legal error but "should be improved."

The Wisconsin Court of Appeals then determined that the questions asked during impeachment were improper, but that this was harmless error. Allowing the defendant to demonstrate the use of an ophthalmoscope in the courtroom was within the trial court's discretion, and although the appeals court did "not approve of the involvement of jurors in such a demonstration," this had no effect on the outcome of the case and therefore was not reversible error.

Finally, the court of appeals held that "[w]e will sustain a jury verdict if there is any credible evidence to support it. See Nieuwendorp v. American Family Ins. Co., 191 Wis. 2d 462, 472, 529 N.W.2d 594, 598 (1995). Our consideration of the evidence must be done in the light most favorable to the verdict, and when more than one inference may be drawn from the evidence, we are bound to accept the inference drawn by the jury . . . . It is the jury's responsibility to determine the credibility of the witnesses and the weight to be afforded their testimony." There was conflicting testimony from experts regarding the standard of care (as to whether, after this type of surgery, a doctor may measure intraocular pressure using his finger or whether the doctor should use a tonometer) and, as it is the role of the jury and not the court of appeals to weigh expert testimony, the court of appeals affirmed the judgment of the trial court.
