= Rick Edwards =

British broadcaster (born 1979)

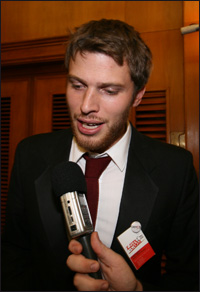
- Edwards c. 2007
- Born: 20 May 1979 (age 47); Enfield, United Kingdom
- Education: Pembroke College, Cambridge
- Occupations: Television presenter, journalist, author, screenwriter
- Years active: 1999–present
- Height: 1.93 m (6 ft 4 in)
- Spouse: Emer Kenny (m. 2016)
- Children: 1

Richard Edwards is an English television presenter, journalist, and author.

Edwards presented T4 for four years, and has also presented Tool Academy, Freshly Squeezed, E4 Music, and much of Channel 4's 2012 Paralympics coverage. Edwards also hosts the Fighting Talk radio show on BBC Radio 5 Live. As a journalist, he has written for The Observer, the Evening Standard and HuffPost. From 2017 to 2021, he presented the BBC quiz show Impossible, and since November 2021, he has co-hosted the BBC Radio 5 Live breakfast show (replacing Nicky Campbell), usually alongside Rachel Burden.

== Early life ==
Born in 1979, he went to Churcher's College and then Portsmouth Grammar School and later attended Pembroke College, Cambridge, where he dated Elizabeth Day and he studied mathematics originally before changing to natural sciences after his first year. He performed stand-up and sketch shows during his time at university.

== Career ==
Edwards hosted a Saturday evening radio show on XFM entitled The Weekender for several years, hosting his last show on 10 January 2009. He also formed part of the BBC presenting team for their coverage of the Reading and Leeds Festival. In 2011, Edwards began hosting E4's Tool Academy, a reality TV show about fed-up girlfriends who have enrolled their underperforming other halves in a school in which "tools become men". During the 2012 Paralympics, Edwards formed part of the Channel 4 commentary team as well as co-presenting That Paralympic Show with Ade Adepitan.

In 2013, Edwards began co-presenting political discussion show Free Speech for BBC Three alongside Tina Daheley. During the 2015 general election, they presented a series of Free Speech specials.

As a writer, his original film Burger Van Champion was commissioned as part of C4's Coming Up strand in 2013 and was described by the Observer as "a remarkable debut" and by Time Out as "funny, touching [and] superbly written".

In July 2015, Edwards began presenting ITV2 panel show Safeword which returned for a second series in 2016.

Edwards currently hosts the podcast Science(ish) alongside Dr Michael Brooks, which delves into the science behind popular films. The series proved such a hit that the duo were commissioned by Atlantic to write a book of the same name, Science(ish): The Peculiar Science Behind The Movies, which was published in October 2017 and ranked number 1 in the Physics, Cosmology, and Humorous Essays Amazon charts for several weeks as well as achieving a position of 21 in the overall book charts. The podcast itself has topped the iTunes Science & Medicine chart.

In March 2016, Edwards landed the anchor role on Sky's DC Fancast alongside Bec Hill. He claims this is a true highlight of his career. In January 2017, Edwards began presenting !mpossible, a daytime BBC One quiz show which ran until April 2021.

From March 2019, Edwards costarred in History's miniseries River Hunters, alongside YouTuber and river-hunter Beau Ouimette.

In September 2021, BBC Radio 5 Live announced that it had hired Edwards to host its new breakfast show alongside Rachel Burden. The new-look 5 Live Breakfast launch took place on 8 November 2021 following Nicky Campbell’s move to a slot later in the day.. In July 2026, it was announced that Edwards and Burden were to leave Radio 5 Live Breakfast, with Naga Munchetty taking over the weekday show.

== Personal life ==
Edwards has said that he has a very poor sense of smell due to sniffing pure ammonia while in school. Edwards supported green organisation Global Cool in 2010 as part of their Traincation campaign, along with his friend George Lamb.

Edwards married EastEnders and Father Brown actress Emer Kenny on 29 May 2016 at Kew Gardens. They live in Kentish Town, north London. Their son was born in January 2023.

== Filmography ==
Television
Year	Title	Role	Notes
2005–2006	E4 Music	Presenter	
2007	Fist of Zen	Narrator	
2007–2011	T4	Presenter	
2008	Relentless	Presenter	1 series
2008–2010	The Hollyoaks Music Show	Presenter	
2008–2012	T4 on the Beach	Presenter	
2009–2010	Freshly Squeezed	Presenter	3 episodes
2010	The Real Hustle	Himself	
2010–2011	Stars and Strikes	Presenter	4 episodes
2010–2012	That Paralympic Show	Co-presenter	
2011	Rick and Peter	Rick	One-off special
2011–2012	Tool Academy	Presenter	3 series
2011–2017	Made in Chelsea	Presenter	Special episodes only
2012	Games On	Writer	Mini series
2012	London 2012 Paralympics on Channel 4	Commentator	
2013	Stalled	Operator	Voice only
2013	Oscar Pistorius: What Really Happened?	Presenter	One-off documentary
2013	The Cleveland Captives: What Really Happened?	Presenter	One-off documentary
2013	The Horsemeat Banquet	Presenter	One-off documentary
2013	Eye Spy	Presenter	3 episodes
2013	Doctor Who Live: The Afterparty	Co-presenter	
2013–2015	Free Speech	Co-presenter with Tina Daheley	
2014	City Limits Live	Co-presenter with Kate Thornton	One-off special
2015	Revolution Presents: Democracy Dealers	Himself	TV film
2015	Chewing Gum	Himself	1 episode
2015–2016	Safeword	Presenter	
2016	DC Fancast	Anchor	
2016	Police Interceptors	Presenter	3 episodes
2016	FHM: The Last of the Lads' Mags	Narrator	
2016	Celebrity Advice Bureau	Himself	3 episodes
2016–2017	Debatable	Panellist	8 episodes
2016–2017	Drunk History	Various	
2017, 2019	Richard Osman's House of Games	Contestant	Winner; both occasions
2017–2021	Impossible	Presenter	8 series (regular); 2 series (celebrity)
2018	Fatberg Autopsy: Secrets of the Sewers	Co-presenter	
2018	The Bermuda Triangle Enigma	Co-presenter with Ortis Deley	3 part series
2018	Child Genius	Contestant	Winner
2019	River Hunters	Co-presenter with Beau Ouimette	
2019	Make or Break?	Presenter	Series 2
2020	The Chop: Britain's Top Woodworker'	Judge	
2021	The Scienc(ish) of Stranger Things'	Co-presenter	
2022	Susan's The Courtship	Presenter	
2022–	Countdown	Dictionary Corner guest	
2026	Great British Castle Rescue	Presenter	3 episodes

== Bibliography ==
- Science(ish): The Peculiar Science Behind the Movies (2017, ISBN 978-1786492210)
- None of the Above (2015, ISBN 978-1471149320)
- Birds of pray (1998, ISBN 978-0953250400)
