= Isaac Waddington =

English singer & pianist (born 1999)

- Born: Isaac Waddington; 9 August 1999 (age 27); Portsmouth, Hampshire, England
- Occupation: Singer
- Instruments: Vocals, piano, guitar
- Years active: 2015–
- Label: Syco Music

Isaac Waddington (born 9 August 1999) is an English singer and pianist, who came to national attention when he appeared as a contestant on the TV programme Britain's Got Talent in 2015.

== Early life and education ==
Waddington's singing career began as a chorister at Chichester Cathedral, during which time he also attended The Prebendal School. He went on to become Head Chorister of the cathedral choir and studied at Portsmouth Grammar School. In 2012, he won the BBC Radio 2 Chorister of the Year competition, leading to an appearance on Songs of Praise.

== Career ==
=== 2015: Britain's Got Talent ===
On 25 April 2015, Waddington's audition for the ninth series of Britain's Got Talent was broadcast on ITV. The cover of "She's Always a Woman" by Billy Joel, was met with 'four yeses' from the judge panel and received a generally positive response from the press.

Waddington was chosen to go through to the live semi-finals of the competition, performing on the fourth night (28 May). His rendition of Bonnie Raitt's song, "I Can't Make You Love Me" resulted in a standing ovation throughout the stadium. He won the semi-final, going through to the finals. Following his success in the semi-final, Waddington's odds for winning the finals were slashed by betting agencies, with Ladbrokes putting his chances on 9/1. Isaac was unaware of this the whole time.

For the finals, on 31 May, Waddington sang his audition piece, She's Always a Woman, again. It garnered another positive reaction. Head judge Simon Cowell commented on how "little changes" had made a big difference, developing his performance since his initial appearance. Despite finishing fifth overall, with 9.7% of the public vote, he was signed by Cowell's label, Syco, within a week.

=== 2018-present: Singles and EP releases ===
Waddington released his debut single, 'Nothing's Changed', in February 2018. In 2019, he released one song a week for five weeks, beginning with the song 'Make It Better'. In September 2020, he released a new EP, “Dirty Mile”, named after the titular track. The EP was preceded by the single "Bright Skies", which was praised by NME, opining that the song, "with its euphoric melodies and dramatic, soul-laced vocals, [is] a gorgeous song brimming with optimism."

In 2022, Waddington released his third EP, Still Not Over You.

== Personal life ==
In September 2020, Waddington announced that he would be cycling that month to raise money for the British Red Cross "Miles For Refugees" appeal. He was a friend of Alex 'Chipmunk' Butler.

== Discography ==
=== Extended plays ===
List of extended plays, with selected details
Title	Details
Borselli: The EP	Released: 22 June 2018; Label: Self-released; Format: Digital download
Dirty Mile	Released: 22 June 2018; Label: Self-released; Format: Digital download
Still Not Over You	Released: 14 July 2022; Label: Self-released; Format: Digital download

=== Singles ===
List of singles as lead artist, showing year released and originating album
Title	Year	Album
"Nothing's Changed"	2018	Borselli: The EP
"Japanese Denim" (with Mahogany)	2018	Non-album singles
"Ready When You Are" (with Mathilda Homer)	2018	Non-album singles
"Someone Like Me" (featuring Piers James)	2018	Non-album singles
"Paper" (Isaac Remix) (with Shungudzo)	2018	Non-album singles
"Enjoy the Ride" (with Joe Beard and Mathilda Homer)	2018	Non-album singles
"Make It Better"	2019	Non-album singles
"Let Me Into Your Heart"	2019	Non-album singles
"Loving You Is Easy" (Live)	2019	Non-album singles
"Hit The Ceiling"	2019	Non-album singles
"Time With You"	2019	Non-album singles
"The Way Things Were" (with edbl)	2019	Non-album singles
"Other Way"	2020	Dirty Mile EP
"Bright Skies"	2020	Dirty Mile EP
"Beggin' Man" (with Evil Genius)	2022	Non-album single
