= Dave Holby =

British indoor rower

Dave Holby-Wolinski BCA
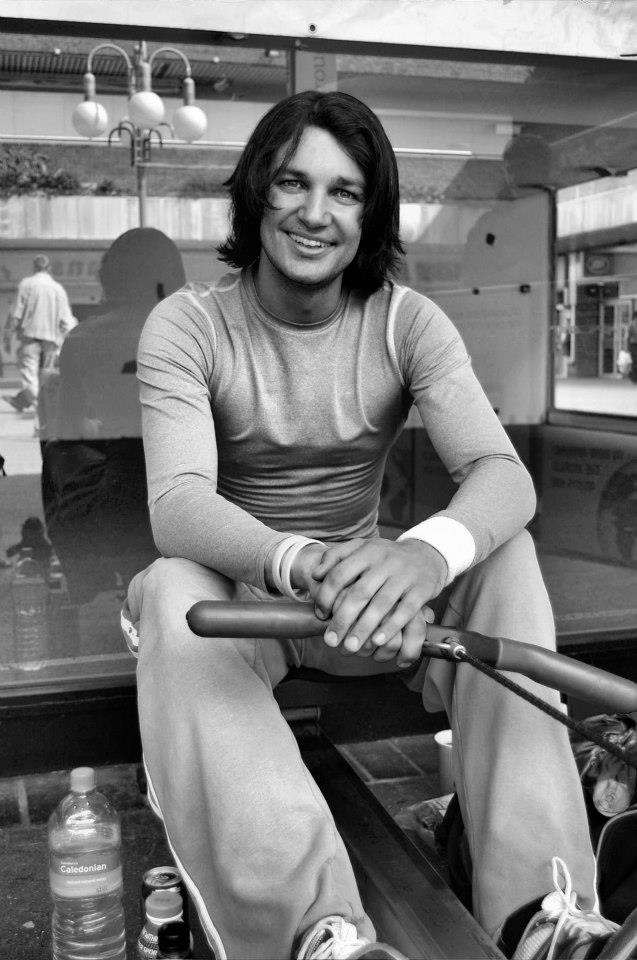
- Dave Holby-Wolinski during his Guinness World Record attempt
- Born: 25 December 1980 (age 45); Plymouth, Devon, England

Dave Holby-Wolinski (born 25 December 1980) is a British indoor rowing endurance world record holder. On 18 December 2010 he became the first person to row the virtual distance around the earth's equator (40,075 km) on a Concept2 land rowing machine, setting a new Guinness World Record of 934 days. The record appears in the 2013 Guinness Book of World Records. His fundraising activities across 20 years have raised over £80,000 for both local and national charities, including Breast Cancer Now and Naomi House & Jacksplace.

In May 2011, he was awarded the Mayor's Medal for his contribution to the borough of Basingstoke and Deane. In July 2014, he was awarded a Chief Constable's Commendation Award by Hampshire Police for tackling an armed shoplifter during an attempted robbery. In January 2018, he was awarded a British Citizens Award for his charitable fundraising. He is a regular compere for Basingstoke's Place to be Proud of Awards having won two awards himself for community service in 2010 and 2013.

Holby-Wolinski's completion of endurance challenges to raise charitable funds has so far seen him set twenty four world and five British indoor rowing records, alongside rowing 30 marathons in 30 Days, running 7 marathons in 7 days carrying a Viking Ship, and completion of the London Marathon in full firefighter gear. He is also known for completing official road races whilst carrying his 57lbs (26kg) indoor rowing machine on his back
