= Impossible (game show) =

British game show

- Genre: Quiz show
- Presented by: Rick Edwards
- Country of origin: United Kingdom
- Original language: English
- No. of series: 8 (Regular); 2 (Celebrity)
- No. of episodes: 225 (Regular); 12 (Celebrity)

Production
- Production location: Dock10 studios HQ1
- Running time: 45 minutes (Regular); 60 minutes (Celebrity)
- Production company: Mighty Productions

Original release
- Network: BBC One
- Release: 2 January 2017 – 23 April 2021

Impossible (stylised as !mpossible) is a British television quiz show created by Hugh Rycroft and produced by Mighty Productions for BBC One. Hosted by Rick Edwards, the show has a maximum prize of £10,000 and features questions in which some answer choices are "impossible" or inconsistent with the given category.

== Gameplay ==
With the exception of Round 2 (see below), all questions used on the show are multiple-choice with at least one answer each of three different types: right, wrong or "impossible". The impossible answers cannot possibly be right, and are distinguished by being inconsistent with the premise of the question. For example, if the question was "Which city in Scotland is its capital?", the choices could be:

- Swansea - impossible answer (Swansea is not a city in Scotland, but is a city in Wales)
- Edinburgh - right answer
- Glasgow - wrong answer (Glasgow is a city in Scotland, but is not Scotland's capital)

On each episode, a pool of contestants competes through two rounds until one is left to play for either the £10,000 jackpot or a smaller daily prize pot built up during the course of the game. Contestants leave the show after playing the £10,000 question once whether they win or not. With the exception of the last episode of each series, players who fail to reach the £10,000 question for any reason return on the next episode as long as they have not reached the end of their eligibility.

The size of the pool and the contestants' time on the show have occasionally changed. In Series 1, 30 contestants competed across all 15 episodes. The entire pool was replaced after every ten episodes in Series 2 and 3 and after every five episodes from Series 4 onward. The pool was 24 contestants in Series 2 through Series 4 and 21 in Series 5. Also, in Series 1, contestants remained on the show until either winning the £10,000 prize or making two unsuccessful attempts at it, rather than one as in all subsequent series. Series 8 had 12 contestants instead of 21 due the coronavirus pandemic social distancing guidelines.

During Series 1 to 3, contestants who left the show were replaced by new ones to keep the pool at a constant size. Starting with the Series 4, the departing contestant is not replaced, leaving their seat empty.

=== Qualifier and Grid ===
This round is played three times, with each playing split into two halves (Qualifier and Grid) to choose a contestant for the Final. The scores are set to zero at the beginning of each Qualifier.

In the Qualifier, the host asks five multiple-choice questions; each with three answer options. Contestants secretly lock in their guesses and earn one point for each correct answer. Wrong answers leave the score unaffected, but an impossible answer, or a failure to answer within the time limit, eliminates the contestant from the game. If exactly one player remains in play after a question, the Qualifier is immediately halted and that player advances to the Grid. However, if all remaining contestants are eliminated on a single question, the entire pool is brought back into play. After the fifth question, the high scorer advances to the Grid; any ties for high score are broken in favour of the contestant who took the shortest total time to lock in their answers.

For the Grid, the high scorer chooses one of four categories and is shown nine answers: one correct, three wrong and five impossible. After hearing the first half of a question, they choose five answers they believe to be impossible; each successful choice adds £100 to the daily prize pot and is removed from the board. The host then reads the second half of the question, with all chosen non-impossible answers returned to play, and the contestant must choose the correct answer in order to advance to the Final. Choosing a wrong answer gives the runner-up (or the last player eliminated in the Qualifier) a chance to find the right answer and advance; however, if this contestant chooses a wrong or impossible answer, the high scorer moves ahead. If any impossible answers remain on the board and the high scorer chooses one, they are eliminated and the runner-up gets a turn; if they fail to choose the correct answer, the host begins working down through the next-highest scorers until one of them does so.

Categories are removed from the list of four as they are chosen, leaving three options in the second playing and two in the third. The maximum daily prize pot is £1,500; this is accumulated by eliminating all five impossible answers in every playing of the Grid, while the smallest possible daily prize pot is £300. Contestants who advance to the Final sit out all subsequent playings of the Qualifier and Grid.

If a Qualifier begins with only one contestant left in the pool, they must still give a correct answer in order to advance to the Grid.

=== Final ===
The three remaining contestants compete directly against one another, answering a series of open-ended questions on the buzzer. Each is given 10 lives to start the round; a correct answer takes one life from both opponents while a wrong answer takes one from the contestant who buzzed in. Some of the questions are themselves impossible (e.g. "Which European city hosted the 1996 Summer Olympics?" – they were hosted in Atlanta, which is in North America). Correctly identifying an impossible question costs both opponents two lives; however, if a contestant either tries to answer a question when it is impossible or incorrectly identifies a possible question as impossible, that contestant loses two lives instead. If a contestant does not answer immediately when they buzz in, they lose a life on a non-impossible question and two lives on an impossible question. Contestants who lose all their lives are eliminated from the game; the last one remaining advances to the £10,000 Question.

=== £10,000 Question ===
The last remaining contestant is asked one question in a randomly chosen category and shown nine answers; three each of correct, wrong and impossible. The contestant has 10 seconds to choose three answers and wins the £10,000 jackpot if all three are correct. They win the daily prize pot if any of their choices are wrong but none are impossible, and nothing at all if they choose an impossible answer.

If a blind or visually impaired contestant reaches this round, the host reads one answer at a time and the contestant says "yes" or "no" to indicate whether they believe it to be correct.

During Series 1, contestants who missed the question were asked a second one under the same rules. This format was dropped at the start of Series 2, giving only one chance to win any money.

The format was further altered in Series 4 in that the departing contestant was no longer replaced, leaving that seat empty for subsequent episodes. The batch of contestants would also stay for one week instead of two like in previous series.

The jackpot is presented onstage as a giant exclamation mark containing 10,000 £1 coins. When a contestant wins it, a hatch in the bottom opens and the coins drain into a hopper underneath.

== Impossible Celebrities ==
On 20 February 2018, it was announced that Impossible would be launching a primetime Celebrity version which began to air in August that year. This version follows the same rules as the Regular version with two changes:

- The pool consists of 18 celebrities; each are playing for a charity of their choice.
- If a celebrity gives an impossible answer during the Final, the daily prize pot is cut in half and donated to their charity.

== Transmissions ==
=== Regular ===
Series	Start date	End date	Episodes
1	2 January 2017	20 January 2017	15
2	22 May 2017	30 June 2017	30
3	16 October 2017	27 July 2018	30
4	30 July 2018	31 August 2018	25
5	29 October 2018	23 November 2018	20
6	22 April 2019	4 October 2019	50
7	19 October 2020	20 November 2020	25
8	15 March 2021	23 April 2021	30

=== Celebrity ===
Series	Start date	End date	Episodes
1	18 August 2018	30 September 2018	6
2	2 March 2019	27 April 2019	6

== Merchandise ==
The official Impossible app for iOS and Android was released by Barnstorm Games on 28 August 2019.

== International broadcast ==
Episodes of Impossible are also seen in the United States on the over-the-top internet television services Plex, Xumo and The Roku Channel, with each looping episodes 24 hours a day on its own dedicated streaming channel.
