= Ian Osterloh =

British clinical researcher

Ian Osterloh is a British clinical researcher for Pfizer, Inc. who led the development of sildenafil citrate (Viagra), as well as a number of Pfizer medications for cardiovascular disease.
