= For Love or Money (American TV series) =

- Genre: Reality
- Written by: Trace Slobotkin
- Directed by: Brian Smith
- Presented by: Jordan Murphy
- Country of origin: United States
- Original language: English
- No. of seasons: 4

Production
- Executive producers: Bruce Nash; J.D. Roth
- Production companies: 3 Ball Productions; Nash Entertainment

Original release
- Network: NBC
- Release: June 2, 2003 – August 9, 2004

For Love or Money is an American reality television show initially broadcast as summer programming on NBC from June 2, 2003 to August 9, 2004. Four seasons of the program were shown in linked pairs, and all seasons were hosted by Jordan Murphy. It was produced by Nash Entertainment with Bruce Nash and J. D. Roth as two of the executive producers.

== Overview ==
The series was a dating game show where the chosen winner had to choose between starting a relationship with the central bachelor or bachelorette, or taking home a cash prize while not being permitted any further contact with the central contestant. Eliminated contestants were forced to rip up the checks that represented the money they could have won.

== Seasons 1 and 2 ==
The first season of the show aired in the summer of 2003. Rob Campos chose among fifteen suitors, unaware that each woman was informed that she was set to win a million dollars if she rejected Rob in the end. The selection boiled down to Erin Brodie and Paige Jones. The two women assumed that Erin would take the money and Paige would take Rob. But in an unexpected move, Rob chose Erin, leaving Paige to tear up her check. But, as expected, Erin rejected Rob and took the million dollars to help care for her ailing father - former NFL quarterback John Brodie, sending Rob home. Paige's emotional displays were later parodied in I Want to Marry Ryan Banks and The Joe Schmoe Show 2.

The second season aired immediately after the first. Erin returned to the house three weeks after she took her million-dollar check. She returned to risk her million dollar-check by being in Rob's position, this time choosing among 15 male suitors. If the final man she chose were to choose her over a million dollars, her million dollars would double; otherwise, the million dollars (in essence) will be passed to him, leaving her with nothing. The men did not know that Erin had already participated in a similar competition.

When she trimmed her choices down to just three, Rob returned as a "fourth man," returning to woo her the second time. It was not revealed to the original contestants that Erin and Rob had already participated in a version of the competition; Rob was implied to be Erin's ex-boyfriend. Although Rob made it to the final three suitor, Erin ultimately rejected him, leaving her to choose between Wade Whistler and Chad Viggiano. In the end, Erin chose Chad, who chose her. As a result, she won both Chad and two million dollars, $500,000 of which she gave to Chad. Chad and Erin eventually broke up, Erin went on to eventually marry Dr. Will Kirby of Big Brother fame. Chad went on to date San Francisco based model, Natasha Hahn.

Rob Campos was dismissed from his law firm, after it was revealed that he was disciplined for drunkenly groping a female Naval officer during his past service in the US Marine Corps.

== Seasons 3 and 4 ==
The third season, which aired in 2004, featured Preston Mercer choosing from among a set of sixteen female suitors. Because the show was cast and filmed after the first version of the series aired, a new twist was incorporated: each woman was initially presented a seemingly blank check that she would have the option of ultimately choosing over Preston. Ultraviolet light would reveal the check's value, which would be one of the following:

- $1
- $50,000
- $100,000
- $250,000
- $500,000
- $1,000,000

Eventually, Preston was informed that the show was in fact For Love or Money and further, he was shown the value of each woman's check while the women themselves initially remained ignorant of their values. In addition, if the woman Preston chose then chose him in return, Preston would subsequently have the option of choosing a million-dollar prize over her. The women did not know that Preston had received any of this information. Some of the female contestants eventually learned the values of their check through competitions within the game. The final four women choose from among four new checks with mystery values; two were worth $1 and two were worth $1 million.

In the end, Preston chose PJ Spillman over Rachel Veltri, who was considered the season's major antagonist. PJ chose Preston, who revealed that he, too, had to choose between love or money, and he chose PJ. Rachel tore up her million-dollar check while PJ did not learn within the show that her check had been worth only one dollar.

In the fourth season, which aired immediately after the third, Rachel returned to the house to again compete for the million dollars that she would have won. She was told that she would choose a suitor from among 15 men, and then would have the option of choosing a million-dollar prize over that suitor if he first chose her over a cash prize. Unbeknownst to her, the same offer was made to Andrea Langi, who also lost a million-dollar check while wooing Preston, and who was in turn unaware of Rachel's presence in the new competition. The two women only learned that they were still competing against each other right before meeting the male contestants.

Each of the fifteen men was presented with checks in the same manner as the women had been in season 3. However, the new twist was that the men were immediately shown the values of their checks while Rachel and Andrea didn't know the values or that the men did know them. The fifteen men were then introduced to both women and had the opportunity to socialize with them for an evening. The men were then instructed to choose one of the two women to continue courting. Eight of the men courted Rachel her while only seven courted Andrea. In a twist, Andrea was consequently eliminated from the show, as were all of the men who had chosen her. Rachel became the sole bachelorette and was left to choose from among the eight men.

Similarly to season 3, the final four men choose from among four mystery checks; again, two were worth one dollar and two were worth a million dollars. In the end, Rachel chose Caleb Janus over Mike Deatly. Caleb chose Rachel over his check and Rachel chose Caleb in return. Mike had to destroy his one-dollar check, while Caleb could forget about his one-dollar check and focus on Rachel, both holders of the million-dollar checks having already been eliminated. It was reported that Caleb and Rachel split up a month after the end of the show's production.

== Episode status ==
In October 2024, Shout! Studios acquired streaming and digital distribution rights to some shows from the Nash Entertainment library, including For Love or Money, making all four seasons of the show are made for streaming online on Tubi, Pluto TV, Plex, Amazon Prime Video and Sling TV's Sling Freestream.
