= Riley Studio =

Slow fashion brand

Riley Studio is a luxury slow fashion brand founded by Riley Uggla, a British-Canadian designer who appeared in the seventh series of Made In Chelsea. It creates a contemporary collection of designs without gender in mind.

== History ==
Riley Studio was founded in 2019 by Riley Uggla, a graduate of Istituto Marangoni.

Riley Studio's focus on gender-neutral clothing allows them to ‘reduce the production of unnecessary garments by focusing on timeless pieces that can be styled by people of all genders and ages.’

In 2021, Little Riley Studio, its sub-brand for kids, partnered with the UK's first rental service for babies and toddlers, Bundlee, to provide a sustainable circular solution for children's clothing.

== Sustainable materials and textiles ==
Riley Studio uses recycled materials to create its pieces.

Riley Studio is one of the first brands to incorporate EVO, a bio-based polyamide fiber, into the design of their collections, causing -25% CO_{2} emissions and using -35% water.

With the aim of ‘creating a puffer that was made entirely from waste',

== Awards ==
In 2019, Riley Studio won ‘The Sustainable Fashion Brand of The Year’ award at The Sustainable Lifestyle Awards.
