= Made in Chelsea series 7 =

Made in Chelsea
- Series 7
- No. of episodes: 11

Release
- Original network: E4
- Original release: 7 April – 16 June 2014

Series chronology
- ← Previous; Series 6 Next → NYC

The seventh series of Made in Chelsea, a British structured-reality television programme, began airing on 7 April 2014 on E4. The series concluded on 16 June 2014 after 11 episodes. This is notably the only series since Series 2 where it wasn't followed by an End of Season reunion show. It is the first to feature new cast members Riley Uggla, Christianne "Tina" Stinnes and Georgia "Toff" Toffolo and the only series to include Riley's friend, Aurelie Mason-Perez and Ed "Fordy" Ford. The series included the rocky relationship between Alex and Binky after a number of revelations about Alex came to light, the isolation of Binky in her friendship group as none of them supported her decision to stay with Alex, a love triangle between Jamie, Lucy and Riley before Jamie realises he still has feelings for Lucy from their previous relationship with each other, and the brief romance between Stephanie and Stevie.

== Cast ==
- Alex Mytton
- Alexandra "Binky" Felstead
- Andy Jordan
- Aurelie Mason-Perez
- Christianne "Tina" Stines
- Fran Newman-Young
- Francesca "Cheska" Hull
- Georgia "Toff" Toffolo
- Jamie Laing
- Louise Thompson
- Lucy Watson
- Mark-Francis Vandelli
- Oliver Proudlock
- Riley Uggla
- Rosie Fortescue
- Sam Thompson
- Sophie Hermann
- Spencer Matthews
- Stephanie Pratt
- Stevie Johnson
- Victoria Baker-Harber

== Episodes ==
No. overall	No. in season	Title	Original release date	Duration	UK viewers
63	1	"There's Gonna Be A Storm"	7 April 2014	60 minutes	1,135,000
Following Jamie’s infidelity in Miami, he tries to explain himself to Lucy but she tells him nothing will ever happen between them again. Rumours about Alex cheating on Binky spread around Chelsea putting the happy couple on the rocks, and he’s shocked when Cheska and Fran admit that they don’t trust him. Victoria adopts a new positive attitude and apologises to Cheska for their past arguments, whilst Louise and Spencer reminisce over old times. Jamie gets angry with Andy after finding out he was always against him and Lucy, and Alex finally tells Binky that he loves her.
64	2	"Doesn't Everyone Have Secrets?"	14 April 2014	60 minutes	1,079,000
With Alex’s cheating rumour being the talk of Chelsea, he begins to get annoyed as more and more people start to doubt him. Lucy questions Stevie after as she fears he knows more about the situation than he’s letting on. Spencer bumps into an old friend Emma and puts his cards on the table, whereas Lucy goes on a disastrous blind date. After doing some investigating over the cheating allegations, Cheska finally agrees to drop the subject, though later receives an important text about it. Louise hosts a singles dinner party, and Binky goes to her mum for support.
65	3	"People Think I Look Like Karl Lagerfeld"	21 April 2014	60 minutes	1,202,000
Binky’s mum meets with Alex to tell him she believes that the rumours are false, whilst Cheska does some further investigating to find out the truth. Stevie feels guilty when he finds confirmation of Alex’s cheating and Cheska takes matters into her own hands. Spencer continues to graft for Emma, Louise and Robbo go on a date, and the boys visit an assault course. At Lucy’s birthday party Cheska finally catches up with Binky and tells her the truth about Alex leaving her heartbroken, but he continues to deny everything and admits he can’t remember what happened.
66	4	"There's Difference Between Bro Code And Being-A-D*ck Code"	28 April 2014	60 minutes	1,113,000
Jamie announces his disappointment towards Stevie for not going to Alex first and instead letting Cheska tell Binky. Louise is puzzled when Spencer invites her to dinner with Emma, and Lucy announces that Stephanie is in London again and is ready for a confrontation with Spencer. Sam introduces his ex-girlfriend Riley and admits he wants her back but it disappointed when Stevie asks her out. Binky goes to New York to get away from the Alex situation but is shocked when she returns as Alex says he doesn’t want to fight for their relationship because he doesn’t trust himself.
67	5	"If Your D*ck's Working, Your Head's Working"	5 May 2014	60 minutes	1,189,000
Stephanie arranges a trip to Venice but is surprised to see Spencer and Emma come along. Emma feels awkward surrounded by three of Spencer’s exes, and Stephanie gives him hell. Riley and Stevie go out on a date much to Sam’s disappointment, leaving Louise no choice but to stand up for her brother. Stephanie gives into temptation and sleeps with Spencer again, regretting it instantly, but both face the consequences as they come face-to-face with an angry Emma. Alex regrets not fighting for Binky so tries to prove to her and her friends that he still wants to be with her.
68	6	"I Want To Be In Everyone's Breast Pocket, Caressing Half Of London's Nipples"	12 May 2014	60 minutes	1,096,000
Alex leaves Binky’s house having had sex with her, but she’s scared of how the girls will react once she tells them the news. Louise encourages Binky to get back with Alex leaving Lucy angry at her for giving her friend the wrong advice. Sam demands an apology from Stevie as the relationship with Riley continues, and Lucy drops a bombshell by revealing more cheating rumours to Binky. An angry Binky is forced to put Alex on the spot by questioning him over more recent allegations and is left reeling when he confesses to cheating on her on four separate occasions.
69	7	"Everyone Loves A Toff"	19 May 2014	60 minutes	1,144,000
Binky isn’t happy with Spencer’s lack of support to her during her breakup and questions where his loyalties lie. Sam reveals his latest conquest and arranges a double date for him and Spencer but is left feeling annoyed after discovering Spencer has gone behind his back and has slept with the girl he was lusting over. Jamie tells Lucy about Alex’s continuous mistreatment to Binky admitting he has slept with other girls with Spencer since they have broken up leaving Lucy with no choice but to tell her friend. Alex is left with a lot of explaining to do as Binky grills him on latest betrayal.
70	8	"I Was Sucked Into A World I Didn't Know"	26 May 2014	60 minutes	1,131,000
Alex blames Spencer for the truth about his infidelity surfacing then begs Binky for his forgiveness. Despite almost being tied down to Riley, Stevie goes on a date with Stephanie and the pair end up kissing. Louise is unimpressed at the way Spencer treated her brother so makes her feelings known, and Sam discovers Stevie’s betrayal and uses it to his advantage by telling Riley the truth. Sam reveals his plan to swoop in and win Riley back unaware Jamie has similar plans for her. Stevie and Stephanie get cosy and Binky apologises to her friends and vents her anger towards Spencer.
71	9	"You're Like A Fat Tom Daley"	2 June 2014	60 minutes	1,266,000
Spencer makes a conscience effort to make things right with Binky but hears that she’s taken Alex back and has had other troubles with Lucy and Cheska. Lucy finds out about Riley and Jamie’s date and gives her an ultimatum, the choice of her job or Jamie. When she chooses Jamie, Lucy has no choice but to fire her. Spencer and Stephanie agree to be civil with each other, and Mark Francis gives Binky fashion advice. Cheska and Lucy confront Binky over the lack of effort she’s shown in their friendship but things gets out of hand when Binky storms out and goes back home with Alex.
72	10	"When Are We Getting Married?"	9 June 2014	60 minutes	1,074,000
When news about Jamie and Riley’s night together spreads, he panics and tells Lucy that he still has feelings for her. However she’s confused as he continues to date Riley and tell her he has feelings for her as well. Mark Francis takes Binky away to take her mind off things and Alex begins a strict drinking ban causing confusion for the boys. Fordy flirts with Louise and arranges a date with her unaware Fran is planning on asking him out, whilst Cheska’s attempt at apologising to Binky fails. Lucy and Riley realise that Jamie is playing them both so team up to confront him.
73	11	"I Tried So Bad, I Even Got Naked"	16 June 2014	60 minutes	1,087,000
Binky feels isolated by the other girls as they continue to have negative opinions on her relationship with Alex, and a conversation with her mum makes her see things from another person’s perspective. Stephanie and Stevie agree to end their brief romance as she returns to America, and Louise and Fordy cook each other meals for their date. Riley demands an apology from Jamie, and Lucy is confused by the whole situation with him. Spencer tells Alex that maybe it’s best if him and Binky split up causing her to make a public announcement for people to stop talking about them.

== Ratings ==
Episode	Date	Official E4 rating	E4 weekly rank
Episode 1	7 April 2014	1,135,000	5
Episode 2	14 April 2014	1,079,000	6
Episode 3	21 April 2014	1,202,000	2
Episode 4	28 April 2014	1,113,000	3
Episode 5	5 May 2014	1,189,000	2
Episode 6	12 May 2014	1,096,000	2
Episode 7	19 May 2014	1,144,000	2
Episode 8	26 May 2014	1,131,000	2
Episode 9	2 June 2014	1,266,000	2
Episode 10	9 June 2014	1,074,000	2
Episode 11	16 June 2014	1,087,000	2
Average		1,138,000	3
