= Made in Chelsea series 3 =

Made in Chelsea
- Series 3
- No. of episodes: 10

Release
- Original network: E4
- Original release: 2 April – 4 June 2012

Series chronology
- ← Previous; Series 2 Next → Series 4

The third series of Made in Chelsea, a British structured-reality television programme, began airing on 2 April 2012 on E4. The series concluded on 4 June 2012 after 10 episodes, however an end of season party episode aired on 11 June 2012 which was hosted by Rick Edwards and featured the cast members reuniting to discuss everything from the series. The series was confirmed on 21 November 2011 following the second series finale. This was the last series to feature original cast members Amber Atherton, Caggie Dunlop and Hugo Taylor, but also saw the introduction of new cast members Kimberley Garner, Natalie Joel and Richard Dinan. The series included a relationship blossoming between Kimberley and Richard until some interference from Cheska led to the discovery that she was living a double life. It also features a love triangle between Spencer, Jamie and Louise causing a drift between best friends, and Millie and Rosie finally rebuilding their friendship.

== Cast ==
- Alexandra "Binky" Felstead
- Francesca "Cheska" Hull
- Francis Boulle
- Gabriella Ellis
- Hugo Taylor
- Jamie Laing
- Kimberley Garner
- Louise Thompson
- Mark-Francis Vandelli
- Millie Mackintosh
- Natalie Joel
- Oliver Proudlock
- Ollie Locke
- Richard Dinan
- Rosie Fortescue
- Spencer Matthews
- Victoria Baker-Harber

== Episodes ==
No. overall	No. in season	Title	Original release date	Duration	UK viewers
20	1	"When You're Part of the Party, You Never Want the Party to Stop"	2 April 2012	60 minutes	905,000
Spencer feels disrespected as he learns that Caggie met someone in Australia and has their initial tattooed on her. Ollie introduces Richard to Cheska and the pair hit it off until Ollie puts his foot in it, comparing Cheska to Bridget Jones. Francis, Jamie, Proudlock and Spencer all take a shine to new girl Kimberley, whilst Hugo is left out of the group as he spends more time with his girlfriend Natalie. Jamie and Spencer announce they’re moving in together, Gabilicious has a party to celebrate her boob reduction, and Millie starts her new job.
21	2	"What's Mine Is Mine and What's Yours We Share"	9 April 2012	60 minutes	534,000
Kimberley and Francis, and Harriet and Jamie double date but Jamie makes his interest in Kimberley known. Natalie goes out of her way to speak to Millie despite Rosie’s concerns, and Jamie and Spencer go flat hunting. Cheska gets jealous when Richard asks ex-girlfriend Gabriella to be the voice of his new advert, whilst there’s tension between Jamie and Spencer as both announce their plans to pursue Kimberley. When they both ask her out on a date, Jamie vents his hurt and anger towards Spencer, and Ollie continues to play matchmaker for Cheska.
22	3	"Sabotage Is Not Chic"	16 April 2012	60 minutes	676,000
With Jamie and Spencer both going after Kimberley, she decides to go on a date with them both but is shocked when Jamie tells her he’s in love with someone else. She then reveals to Spencer that she’s glad Jamie confided in her about his feelings, but has she said too much? As Cheska and Gabriella both admit they like Richard, they’re forced into another argument. Rosie goes for an interview at Glamour despite knowing Millie already works there, and Jamie surprises Louise by visiting her in Edinburgh to confess his love for her, but she drops a bombshell by admitting Spencer has been messaging her again.
23	4	"What's the Point of a Point to Point"	23 April 2012	60 minutes	762,000
Cheska is determined to find out if Richard likes her or not so sends Ollie on a mission, however she’s not impressed when she finds out he likes Kimberley instead. Jamie and Spencer continue to compete for Louise’s attention and the penny finally drops as Jamie realises Spencer has been manipulating him and turning him against Louise. Millie confronts Rosie over her job at Glamour, Cheska and Gabriella clash once again. Meanwhile, after a few heated discussions with the men in her life, Louise decides she wants to be with Jamie.
24	5	"I'm Not Really That Gay at All"	30 April 2012	60 minutes	722,000
Spencer is still convinced the relationship with Jamie and Louise won’t last and continues to play with both of their emotions. Feeling left out of the group, Millie calls Hugo and the pair agree to be friends again. With the help of Richard, Ollie meets a man and they’re quickly drawn to each other, however after their first date Ollie is left disappointed when Chris rejects his kiss. Elsewhere, at Fredrik and Mark-Francis’ art gallery event, Spencer attempts to make Louise jealous by bringing Sophie, a girl who he met in Dubai, and Rosie and Victoria aren’t happy about Millie worming her way back into Hugo’s life.
25	6	"Until The Book's Closed It's Open"	7 May 2012	60 minutes	795,000
The group head to Dubai for Louise’s birthday but Jamie remains in London for an important meeting with his bank. Sophie feels neglected by Spencer as he continues to pursue Louise, and Jamie asks Francis to keep an eye on them and report back if anything happens between them. When Kimberley tells Cheska she has feelings for Richard, the pair get bickering, and Richard is unimpressed as Cheska interferes in his love life again. Francis drops a bombshell on Jamie as he reveals that Louise and Spencer have spent the night together.
26	7	"Karma's A Bitch"	14 May 2012	60 minutes	864,000
Louise and Spencer return from Dubai to find Jamie waiting for a confrontation on their doorstep. With her life falling apart, Louise goes to Millie for help, who then plans a spa weekend for the girls. Natalie accidentally invites Rosie to the spa weekend much to Millie’s disappointment. Jamie admits he’ll never be able to forgive both Louise and Spencer for their betrayal, and Millie clashes with Cheska, Rosie and Victoria forcing her to leave the spa early. With Richard on a date with Kimberley, Binky learns that she’s been living a double life and has another boyfriend, Diego. Louise and Spencer finally agree to give things another go.
27	8	"Everyone Has Skeletons In Their Closet"	21 May 2012	60 minutes	857,000
Binky and Cheska meet Diego to get to the bottom of Kimberley’s lies, and the three of them plan to expose the truth. Meanwhile, Louise questions Spencer about Karin after finding out they once slept together, and Millie and Rosie’s bickering continues forcing Hugo to step in to try to get them to make amends. Jamie tries to rebuild the friendship with Spencer but still isn’t convinced he’s doing the right thing, whilst Cheska shows up to a party with Diego, who’s waiting to confront a shocked Kimberley. After finally explaining herself, Richard offers to take Kimberley away to Italy for the weekend as long as she makes up with Cheska.
28	9	"It's Called Dessert And Apparently It's Sucking Richard's Face"	28 May 2012	60 minutes	1,059,000
Ollie invites himself, Binky and Cheska along to Kimberley and Richard’s romantic weekend in Italy, then Binky accidentally invites Gabriella. As things get awkward, Kimberley decides to have a chat with Cheska to clear the air but it’s unsuccessful as they end up getting into another argument. With the tension increasing, Gabriella arrives making things even more awkward. Meanwhile, Francis, Jamie and Proudlock go looking for girls and Louise feels that Jamie would never forgive her. Ollie and Gabriella finally agree to be friends again, and Richard announces that he and Kimberley will continue to see each other.
29	10	"At The End Of The Day, I've Got The Crazy Title. No One Can Steal That From Me"	4 June 2012	60 minutes	670,000
Wanting an outsider’s opinion, Spencer meets Caggie to ask her advice on the Jamie and Louise love triangle situation, but Louise isn’t happy with what she suggests. Richard decides that the only way his relationship with Kimberley could work is if he completely ignores Cheska. At Ollie’s 1960’s themed party, Cheska asks Kimberley’s best friend to tell the truth about Kimberley’s double life before apologising to Richard for medalling. Elsewhere, Louise tries to make up with Jamie but her attempts are unsuccessful, and Spencer finally apologises to Jamie.
–	–	""End of Season Party""	11 June 2012	60 minutes	757,000
Presented by Rick Edwards, the cast reunite to discuss events from the series.

== Ratings ==
Episode	Date	Official E4 rating	E4 weekly rank
Episode 1	2 April 2012	905,000	6
Episode 2	9 April 2012	534,000	10
Episode 3	16 April 2012	676,000	6
Episode 4	23 April 2012	762,000	4
Episode 5	30 April 2012	722,000	5
Episode 6	7 May 2012	795,000	3
Episode 7	14 May 2012	864,000	3
Episode 8	21 May 2012	857,000	3
Episode 9	28 May 2012	1,059,000	3
Episode 10	4 June 2012	670,000	5
End of Season Party	11 June 2012	757,000	2
Average		784,000	5
