= Made in Chelsea series 1 =

Made in Chelsea
- Series 1
- No. of episodes: 8

Release
- Original network: E4
- Original release: 9 May – 27 June 2011

Series chronology
- Next → Series 2

The first series of Made in Chelsea, a British structured-reality television programme, began airing on 9 May 2011 on E4. The series concluded on 27 June 2011 after 8 episodes. The show was first announced in April 2011 and was described as a "fly-on-the-wall-drama". Filming for the series took place between January and May 2011, with the first full-length trailer airing 28 April 2011. This series includes Spencer and Funda's turbulent relationship come to an end after his childhood sweetheart Caggie comes back into his life, Hugo being torn between two women; Millie and Rosie, and best friends Francis and Fredrik both realising they've fallen for the same girl. It also features the breakdown of Ollie and Gabriella's relationship as he eventually has the courage to come out as bisexual. The DVD for the series was released on 19 September 2011 and features all 8 episodes.

== Cast ==
- Agne Motiejunaite
- Alexandra "Binky" Felstead
- Amber Atherton
- Catherine "Caggie" Dunlop
- Francesca "Cheska" Hull
- Francis Boulle
- Fredrik Ferrier
- Funda Önal
- Gabriella Ellis
- Hugo Taylor
- Mark-Francis Vandelli
- Millie Mackintosh
- Ollie Locke
- Rosie Fortescue
- Spencer Matthews

== Episodes ==
No. overall	No. in season	Title	Original release date	Duration	UK viewers
1	1	"Ad Victorem Spolias – To The Victor Go The Spoils"	9 May 2011	60 minutes	583,000
Socialite Amber hosts a launch party, but there’s clear tension as Cheska decides to write a blog about the event. As Caggie and Spencer flirt, he reveals he’s moved in with his girlfriend. Milly tries her luck with Fredrik, whilst Hugo is hurt when Amber rejects his Facebook friendship. The next day Spencer lies to girlfriend, Funda and goes to Caggie’s first gig where he and Francis compete for her attention. Amber is insulted after reading Cheska’s blog, and Spencer finally reveals the truth to Funda.
2	2	"Quick, Let's Have A Quickie"	16 May 2011	60 minutes	621,000
Caggie and Funda finally come face-to-face causing Caggie to finally realise how serious Spencer is with his girlfriend. Gabriella arranges a skiing weekend in France for Ollie’s birthday unaware that Cheska and Binky are planning to gatecrash it. Fredrik surprises Millie by taking her out for lunch, and Binky receives a shock by bumping into her ex-boyfriend Simon whilst in France much to the disappointment of her friends. Meanwhile Caggie decides to step back from Spencer, and Hugo ruffles feathers by setting her up with his friend CJ.
3	3	"I'm So Honest With Everyone, Maybe It's A Downfall"	23 May 2011	60 minutes	639,000
When Hugo arranges clay pigeon shooting, Spencer and CJ get competitive. Funda has no choice but to confront Caggie after noticing a few looks between her and Spencer. Hugo and Amber finally go on a date, but when Rosie interrupts it he soon realises that she might be the one he’s falling for. At Francis’ charity night, Millie wins a date with Hugo leaving Rosie obviously jealous. Elsewhere, Caggie reveals nothing would ever happen with CJ, and Ollie confides in Binky before eventually ending his relationship with Gabriella.
4	4	"Do I Look Like Jesus?"	30 May 2011	60 minutes	503,000
Caggie finally makes an effort to get to know Funda a bit more and asks her out to brunch. Hugo is torn over his feelings towards Rosie before heading out on a date with Millie. Spencer announces his disapproval over Funda’s new modelling outfits, whilst the boys compete to impress Agne during a poker night. With Spencer questioning Rosie about her intentions with Hugo, they’re unaware that he and Millie are sharing a kiss. Ollie finally gives Gabriella an explanation to why he ended the relationship and confesses to being bisexual.
5	5	"Take Your Passion, Make It Happen"	6 June 2011	60 minutes	651,000
With Hugo still torn between Millie and Rosie, he makes a decision and ends things with Millie before going after Rosie and asking her for a relationship. However, when Rosie find out about Hugo’s kiss with Millie she realises he can’t be the one for her. Funda meets Spencer’s ex-girlfriend Louise and bonds over their situation with Caggie, whilst Fredrik takes Agne out on a date. Following an argument with Funda, Spencer plans a surprise birthday weekend in Cannes for Caggie. Elsewhere, Ollie decides to pursue modelling.
6	6	"Problems Not Solutions, That's The Way I Live My Life"	13 June 2011	60 minutes	791,000
As Caggie, Millie, Spencer and Hugo arrive in Cannes, Spencer drops a bombshell by revealing him and Funda have split up. Mark-Francis surprises Agne with a business proposition, meanwhile Ollie tries his luck by meeting a modelling agency, and Francis and Fredrik both realise they have feelings for Agne. Elsewhere, Hugo and Millie get flirty and end up sharing another kiss, and Spencer lays his cards on the table for Caggie but she rejects him. Back in Chelsea, Funda hears about Spencer’s weekend away and is quick to confront him about it, then clashes with Caggie.
7	7	"Payback's A Bitch"	20 June 2011	60 minutes	734,000
Rosie tells Agne the truth about Francis and Fredrik both playing her leaving her angry with the boys, and Spencer initiates Plan B over Caggie by telling Millie his feelings for her have gone. At the masquerade ball, Spencer realises his plan has backfired when Caggie confronts him over what he’s told Millie. Elsewhere, Rosie offers Hugo a way out of his relationship leaving Millie upset, and Ollie hurts Gabriella by talking to another girl. Agne announces her resignation after the fallout with Francis, and Ollie ends up getting a date whilst trying to set up Cheska.
8	8	"I Find It The Biggest Turn On That He's Shouting At Me"	27 June 2011	60 minutes	718,000
Wanting to move on from Spencer for good, Caggie decides to move back to New York, but asks Millie to keep it a secret from the others. Francis attempts to make amends with Rosie, then convinces Agne to go on a date with him. Meanwhile, Ollie and Gabriella have a heart-to-heart as he reveals he’s been on a date with a man, and Caggie says a final goodbye to Spencer for good before setting off to the airport. In a last desperate attempt to win her over, Spencer races to the airport to stop her getting on the plane but he’s too late.

== Ratings ==
Episode	Date	Official E4 rating	E4 weekly rank
Episode 1	9 May 2011	583,000	3
Episode 2	16 May 2011	621,000	3
Episode 3	23 May 2011	639,000	3
Episode 4	30 May 2011	503,000	2
Episode 5	6 June 2011	651,000	4
Episode 6	13 June 2011	791,000	2
Episode 7	20 June 2011	734,000	2
Episode 8	27 June 2011	718,000	3
Average		655,000	3
