= Made in Chelsea series 6 =

Made in Chelsea
- Series 6
- No. of episodes: 11

Release
- Original network: E4
- Original release: 14 October – 23 December 2013

Season chronology
- ← Previous; Series 5 Next → Series 7

The sixth series of Made in Chelsea, a British structured-reality television programme, began airing on 14 October 2013 on E4. The series concluded on 16 December 2013 after 10 episodes, however a Christmas special episode aired immediately after the series on 23 December 2013, which was then followed by an end of season special presented by Rick Edwards on 30 December 2013 featuring a reunion of the cast to discuss events from the series. This was the first series to feature new cast members Sam Thompson, Sophie Hermann and Stephanie Pratt, and was the final series to feature Olivia Newman-Young, Phoebe-Lettice Thompson, and original cast member Francis Boulle. The series featured the love blossoming between Jamie and Lucy despite obstacles in the form of Spencer and Phoebe, the breakdown of Andy and Louise's relationship as many secrets are revealed, the rivalry between friends Fran and Phoebe as Phoebe discovers Fran has made a pass at her ex-boyfriend, and the start of the relationship for Alex and Binky.

== Cast ==
- Alex Mytton
- Alexandra "Binky" Felstead
- Andy Jordan
- Fran Newman-Young
- Francesca "Cheska" Hull
- Francis Boulle
- Jamie Laing
- Louise Thompson
- Lucy Watson
- Mark-Francis Vandelli
- Oliver Proudlock
- Olivia Newman-Young
- Phoebe-Lettice Thompson
- Rosie Fortescue
- Sam Thompson
- Spencer Matthews
- Stephanie Pratt
- Stevie Johnson
- Victoria Baker-Harber

== Episodes ==
No. overall	No. in season	Title	Original release date	Duration	UK viewers
52	1	"I'd Have Sex With Any Of My Exes"	14 October 2013	60 minutes	870,000
With Lucy still reeling over the fact that Spencer cheated on her, she turns her attentions to Louise’s relationship and drops a bombshell on Andy causing the pair to split up. Alex and Fran grow closer until they kiss, but Fran immediately feels guilty over the impact it will have over Phoebe. Spencer goes to Louise to give her advice on trying to win back Andy and isn’t impressed that Lucy is punishing her for his wrong-doings. Meanwhile, Francis attempts to ask Rosie out, and Fran tells Phoebe the truth about her kiss with Alex, is this the end of their friendship?
53	2	"Your Friends Are All Pretty Rude"	21 October 2013	60 minutes	890,000
Louise has no choice but to explain herself to Andy which results in them spending the night together again much to Lucy’s disappointment, who once again tells Andy about another of Louise’s betrayals. Spencer shows new girlfriend Stephanie around London, but gets a frosty reception when she comes face-to-face with Lucy. Phoebe is startled to find Alex and Fran out together leaving her no choice but to confront her friend. Proudlock notices a new connection between Jamie and Lucy, but they know Spencer wouldn’t approve. Andy finally tells Louise he’s had enough of her messing him around and breaks up with her.
54	3	"If You Are Going To Play Two Girls, It's Best To Play Two Who Don't Know Each Other"	28 October 2013	60 minutes	893,000
Jamie and Phoebe go on their first date, but she’s unaware that he’s slept with Lucy until Louise delivers the shocking truth in an awkward phone call. As the news spreads fast, Jamie has no choice but to tell Spencer the truth. Alex accidentally asks both Binky and Fran round for a date, but realising his mistake, he lies to Fran about a change of plan. However, things don’t end well when Binky and Fran come face-to-face and discuss Alex. Stephanie confides in Louise about Spencer not returning home the night before, and Lucy and Phoebe clash over Jamie.
55	4	"I Once Knew Someone Who Had A Sleeping Bag"	4 November 2013	60 minutes	868,000
The boys enjoy a camping trip away from Chelsea, while the girls relax at a luxury spa. Tension soon builds when Phoebe and Fran attempt to put their differences aside, and Lucy discovers that Jamie is still texting Phoebe. Louise and Phoebe secretly leave the spa and join the boys, and Alex is the bearer of bad news as he informs Binky of their betrayal. Phoebe gives Jamie an ultimatum before jetting off on holiday, but Fran reveals to Lucy that she’s actually meeting up with her boyfriend. Lucy and Jamie finally discuss their feelings for each other but are interrupted by angry Spencer.
56	5	"Your Buds Are Way More Important Than Any Girl"	11 November 2013	60 minutes	884,000
Spencer arranges to meet Louise and announces he’s split with Stephanie after spending the night with another girl. Andy is shocked when Spencer tells him that Louise will always have feelings for him, and Jamie agrees to put Spencer before his feelings for Lucy. Louise and Lucy realise Spencer hasn’t been honest with Stephanie so team up to expose the truth, and after confessing to having a boyfriend, Phoebe attacks Fran by spreading the rumour in the first place. Elsewhere, Binky gets suspicious as she feels Lucy is jealous of her and Alex.
57	6	"Willies Aren't Such A Big Thing, We All Know That"	18 November 2013	60 minutes	859,000
Alex meets Binky’s mum for the first time, where Binky spills her insecurities as she believes Lucy still likes Alex. Jamie thinks of a devious plan of getting Lucy to fall in love with him again, but it backfires when he causes an awkward atmosphere. Spencer seeks revenge and tells Andy the truth about when Louise cheated on him leaving her no choice but to admit it. However, Andy has some explaining of his own to do when Fran’s friend arrives at Cheska’s party and it’s revealed that they slept together. Spencer and Louise call a truce, and Francis teaches Stevie how to ride a bike.
58	7	"You Need to Get Under Someone to Get Over Someone"	25 November 2013	60 minutes	1,040,000
Phoebe suggests that Louise should sleep with Spencer to get back at Andy, but is surprised to hear that the two of them actually hooked up after her exclusive dinner party. While Spencer happily breaks the news to Andy, Louise is left confused as she denies having sex with him. Sam has no choice but to stand up for his sister, and Andy explodes at Louise after hearing about the betrayal. Proudlock goes on a mission to discover Lucy’s true feelings for Jamie, but things get complicated when she admits to texting Spencer again. Elsewhere, Phoebe and Fran’s bickering continues.
59	8	"Let's Go For A Drink, Maybe Some Fondling"	2 December 2013	60 minutes	938,000
Andy demands an explanation from Spencer in the aftermath of his one night stand being revealed, while Fran puts doubts in Binky’s mind over Alex as he continues to be close to Phoebe. Sam attempts to woo Fran on their date but are accidentally interrupted by Louise. Elsewhere, Spencer and Lucy call a truce, Jamie plans a trip to South Africa and Binky has no choice but to confront Phoebe over her intentions with Alex. With the group happy that Phoebe isn’t invited to South Africa, they’re unaware that Spencer has secretly asked her to come along.
60	9	"Fancy A Bit Of African Holiday Sex?"	9 December 2013	60 minutes	782,000
Lucy is far from impressed when Phoebe arrives at the airport announcing she will be joining the group on their trip to South Africa. Jamie and Spencer bicker over Lucy, but she reveals that she wants neither of them, and she finally makes friends with Phoebe. Elsewhere in Chelsea, Andy asks Spencer’s ex-girlfriend Vitalia on a date, Fran lets Sam down gently, and Victoria and Cheska get into a heated argument. After hearing about recent events, Spencer goes on a mission to get Vitalia from Andy. Meanwhile there’s tears as Jamie confesses his love for Lucy but she rejects him.
61	10	"If You Knew Everything I'd Be In Deep Deep Trouble"	16 December 2013	60 minutes	981,000
Fran tries once more to make friends with Phoebe but she throws it back in her face. Jamie misunderstands Alex when he tells him he’s never found love since Phoebe, and Binky isn’t happy as gossip spreads. Lucy panics when she accidentally sends Jamie a drunk text message then fears he may misinterpret things between them. Spencer meets with Vitalia in an attempt to separate her from Andy causing more tension between the love rivals. When things go wrong, Spencer ends up cutting all contact from her. Meanwhile Fran is worried that Alex is changing and may hurt Binky.
62	11	"Miracles Happen At Christmas"	23 December 2013	60 minutes	1,102,000
Andy meets up with Louise to try to make amends after recent events, while Fran and Phoebe also put their differences aside and become friends again. Lucy feels upset as Jamie distances himself from her and starts to realise that she’s falling in love with him. Binky’s mum asks Alex round to theirs for Christmas leaving him with a big dilemma as he feels the relationship is moving too quickly. As arguments erupt during a Christmas ball between Victoria, Sophie, Lucy and Cheska, they’re all shocked when Jamie surprises Lucy with a huge gesture and the pair finally get together.
–	–	""End of Season Party""	30 December 2013	60 minutes	764,000
Presented by Rick Edwards, the cast reunite to discuss events from the series.

== Ratings ==
Episode	Date	Official E4 rating	E4 weekly rank
Episode 1	14 October 2013	870,000	4
Episode 2	21 October 2013	890,000	1
Episode 3	28 October 2013	893,000	2
Episode 4	4 November 2013	868,000	5
Episode 5	11 November 2013	884,000	3
Episode 6	18 November 2013	859,000	5
Episode 7	25 November 2013	1,040,000	2
Episode 8	2 December 2013	938,000	3
Episode 9	9 December 2013	782,000	7
Episode 10	16 December 2013	981,000	4
Christmas Special	23 December 2013	1,102,000	1
End of Season Party	30 December 2013	764,000	6
Average		919,000	3
