= Made in Chelsea series 5 =

Made in Chelsea
- Series 5
- No. of episodes: 11

Release
- Original network: E4
- Original release: 8 April – 17 June 2013

Season chronology
- ← Previous; Series 4 Next → Series 6

The fifth series of Made in Chelsea, a British structured-reality television program, began airing on 8 April 2013 on E4. The series ended on 17 June 2013 after 11 episodes, including an end of season reunion episode featuring the cast and hosted by Rick Edwards. This was the first series to include new cast members Fran and Olivia Newman-Young, Phoebe Lettice-Thompson, and Alex Mytton. It was the only series to feature Josh Acoombs and Oscar Ligenza. Series 5 also saw the departures of original cast members Ollie Locke, Millie Mackintosh, Richard Dinan and Ashley James. Major events in the series included the end of Spencer and Louise's relationship after the revelation that Spencer cheated, Louise and Spencer beginning new romances with Andy and Lucy respectively, Ashley struggling to come to terms with Ollie's sexuality, Jamie realising he has feelings for Phoebe despite being in a relationship with Tara, and Francis and Proudlock once again competing for the same girl.

== Cast ==
- Alex Mytton
- Alexandra "Binky" Felstead
- Andy Jordan
- Ashley James
- Fran Newman-Young
- Francesca "Cheska" Hull
- Francis Boulle
- Jamie Laing
- Josh Acoombs
- Louise Thompson
- Lucy Watson
- Mark-Francis Vandelli
- Millie Mackintosh
- Olivia Newman-Young
- Oliver Proudlock
- Ollie Locke
- Oscar Ligenza
- Phoebe-Lettice Thompson
- Richard Dinan
- Rosie Fortescue
- Spencer Matthews
- Stevie Johnson
- Victoria Baker-Harber

== Episodes ==
No. overall	No. in season	Title	Original release date	Duration	UK viewers
41	1	"I Made A Mistake That I Wanted To Cover Up"	8 April 2013	60 minutes	956,000
As Spencer announces that he and Louise are back together, Francis announces that he and Sophia have also split, and Sophia has moved away. Jamie and Proudlock are caught in the middle of Spencer and Francis’ new rivalry as they’re forced to make a decision as to who they want to live with. Louise feels upset when she finds out that Millie and Rosie don’t support her relationship with Spencer, whilst Andy meets his old uni friend Fran. Ollie and Ashley go public with their new romance, and Lucy reveals that Spencer contacted her the day after he and Louise had broken up, and tells Louise.
42	2	"I Am Not A Robot"	15 April 2013	60 minutes	884,000
Andy invites some of the group skiing, but is unaware of the awkward history between Olivia and Lucy. Cheska becomes increasingly jealous that Binky is hanging around with Lucy instead of her, and Spencer attempts to rekindle his friendship with Rosie, but doesn’t care about Millie. In Verbier, Phoebe and Jamie get flirty in the hot tub, and an attentive Lucy tells Binky that she has started to develop feelings for him. Lucy and Olivia clash as their past problems are revealed, Josh isn’t impressed with ex-girlfriend Phoebe getting close to other men, and Jamie announces he has a girlfriend, Tara.
43	3	"Of Course I'm Going To Say I'm Straight"	22 April 2013	60 minutes	839,000
Ashley gets a shock when she stumbles across some gay porn in Ollie’s DVD collection and has no choice but to quiz him about it. Lucy reveals to Binky that her and Jamie shared a kiss in Verbier, before Francis tells her Jamie has a girlfriend. Spencer and Louise’s relationship finally comes to an end following a violent encounter, and she later discovers he cheated on her once again whilst she was in Edinburgh. Jamie denies kissing Lucy, but is left squirming after seeing her speaking to Tara, and Spencer sets his sights on Phoebe.
44	4	"He Is Being A Tit"	29 April 2013	60 minutes	824,000
Stevie tells Andy that he was there on the night that Spencer cheated on Louise, Jamie continues to deny stringing Lucy along, and Andy asks Fran out on a date. Meanwhile, Ollie introduces his friend Oscar to the group, but there is clear tension between him and Cheska. Ashley learns that Oscar and Ollie have slept in the same bed together and fears the worst. Confused by everything, Ashley considers breaking up with Ollie. Tara isn’t impressed with the rumours about Lucy and has no choice but to confront Jamie about them, and Spencer finally confesses to Louise that he cheated on her, but tells Rosie they’ve slept together since the break-up.
45	5	"Kill Jamie, Marry Andy, Kiss Spencer"	6 May 2013	60 minutes	872,000
Millie and Rosie are left baffled by Louise and Spencer’s ongoing conflict and aren’t sure whom to believe, whilst Proudlock and Phoebe begin to get close despite Josh’s disapproval. Spencer takes Lucy out on a date and surprises her with tickets to Paris, leaving Louise heartbroken and falling into the arms of Andy. Fran isn’t impressed by Andy’s actions towards Louise and questions her brief romance. Ashley attempts to fix the holes in her relationship with Ollie, but Oscar continues to make things difficult. A confused Jamie fears his relationship with Tara may be over.
46	6	"I Wouldn't Want My Daughter Going Out With Spencer Matthews"	13 May 2013	60 minutes	846,000
Spencer and Lucy’s romantic trip to Paris doesn’t sit well with the others as both Jamie and Louise aren’t impressed with his actions. Proudlock and Phoebe continue to flirt, and a hurt Josh feels like he’s been betrayed by them both. Victoria suggests Mark-Francis uses Binky for a model for a photoshoot in his new magazine, and Spencer finally apologises to Francis. Fran is upset when she hears that Andy has taken Louise out on a date, Phoebe and Josh clash as the situation with Proudlock escalates, and Louise and Lucy go head-to-head.
47	7	"Is He A Fantastic Lay?"	20 May 2013	60 minutes	913,000
Andy and Louise announce that they’re in a relationship, causing concern for the others as they start to wonder whether she’s really over Spencer. Lucy gets her wires crossed with Spencer and is shocked to hear his idea of casual, leaving her no choice but to end their brief fling. After seeing Phoebe and Jamie flirting, Proudlock decides to end things before they get serious. Spencer makes a failed attempt at patching things up between Jamie and Lucy, Ashley’s upset as her romance with Ollie breaks down, and there’s tears as Louise and Lucy clash again.
48	8	"See You Later, Spenny"	27 May 2013	60 minutes	847,000
Victoria is left disgusted when Spencer reminds her of their childhood kiss, whilst Lucy and Stevie plan their house-warming party. Lucy promises to play Spencer at his own game then goes out with Binky on the hunt for a man, where she meets Alex. There’s drama at the house-warming when Alex is revealed as Phoebe’s ex-boyfriend, and Olivia quickly becomes defensive for her friend and has it out with Lucy over Alex. After seeing Lucy with Alex, Spencer realises that the feelings he has for her are strong, and decides to take a break from Chelsea. Meanwhile Josh is pleased to hear that everything between Phoebe and Proudlock is over.
49	9	"It's Very Rare To Find Someone Who Hasn't F*cked One Of Your Friends"	3 June 2013	60 minutes	927,000
Spencer leaves London to try and move on, whilst Alex and Lucy grow closer despite Phoebe’s disapproval. Josh and Ashley go on their first date, but it doesn’t go well as Ollie accidentally bumps into them, causing Ashley to start an argument with him. Phoebe takes on Lucy once again as she accuses her of getting with Alex to make Spencer jealous, whilst Jamie finally admits that he and Lucy kissed in Verbier. Spencer puts Jamie in charge of arranging a trip to Barcelona, and specifically asks him to bring Lucy, but what are his intentions?
50	10	"Hot Tubs Are Like My Nemesis"	10 June 2013	60 minutes	1,069,000
The group arrive in Barcelona and immediately question Spencer’s motives for inviting both Lucy and Alex. He then confesses his true feelings towards her, leaving the ball in her court. Lucy tells Alex that they should remain friends before accepting Spencer’s relationship proposal. Francis and Proudlock join running club to meet girls but end up competing for the same one, Binky tries to set Fran up with her male friends, and Phoebe isn’t impressed that Lucy has hurt Alex despite her constant warnings. Spencer is upset as Jamie tells Lucy that he doesn’t agree with the new romance.
51	11	"She's Becoming Spencer"	17 June 2013	60 minutes	895,000
Andy throws Louise a surprise graduation party as she returns from Edinburgh, but discovers she’s lied about her whereabouts the previous night and instead spent the night with another man. After hearing Louise deny everything, Andy is left questioning his relationship. Lucy isn’t happy when Spencer tries to comfort Louise over the situation, and Fran announces she’s hooked up with Ollie despite Oscar’s growing feelings for her. Millie feels hurt that Louise could be so heartless towards Andy especially knowing what she’s been through herself.
–	–	""End of Season Party""	24 June 2013	60 minutes	725,000
Presented by Rick Edwards, the cast reunite to discuss events from the series.

== Ratings ==
Episode	Date	Official E4 rating	E4 weekly rank
Episode 1	8 April 2013	965,000	3
Episode 2	15 April 2013	884,000	3
Episode 3	22 April 2013	839,000	3
Episode 4	29 April 2013	824,000	3
Episode 5	6 May 2013	872,000	3
Episode 6	13 May 2013	846,000	4
Episode 7	20 May 2013	913,000	3
Episode 8	27 May 2013	847,000	3
Episode 9	3 June 2013	927,000	3
Episode 10	10 June 2013	1,069,000	3
Episode 11	17 June 2013	895,000	3
End of Season Party	24 June 2013	725,000	4
Average		898,000	3
