= Made in Chelsea series 2 =

Made in Chelsea
- Series 2
- No. of episodes: 11 (incl. Christmas Special)

Release
- Original network: E4
- Original release: 19 September – 21 November 2011; Christmas Special: 22 December 2011

Series chronology
- ← Previous; Series 1 Next → Series 3

The second series of Made in Chelsea, a British structured-reality television programme, began airing on 19 September 2011 on E4. The series concluded on 21 November 2011 after 10 episodes, however an end of season party episode aired on 28 November 2011 which was hosted by Rick Edwards and featured the cast members reuniting to discuss everything from the series. Filming for the series began on 29 July 2011. This series featured the arrival of several new cast members including Alice Davidson, Chloe Green, Jamie Laing, Oliver Proudlock and Victoria Baker-Harber as well as the reintroduction of Louise Thompson, the ex-girlfriend of Spencer Matthews who briefly appeared during the first series. On 22 December 2011, the show's first Christmas special aired. The series included a rift forming between Binky and Cheska as they're forced to pick sides with Gabriella and Ollie, Spencer breaking off his brief fling with Louise to chase after Caggie again, and the breakdown of Hugo and Millie's relationship when it's announced that both have cheated on each other, leading up to Millie exposing Hugo's night with Rosie to a room full of guests.

== Cast ==
- Alexandra "Binky" Felstead
- Alice Davidson
- Amber Atherton
- Catherine "Caggie" Dunlop
- Chloe Green
- Francesca "Cheska" Hull
- Francis Boulle
- Fredrik Ferrier
- Gabriella Ellis
- Gabriella "Gabalicious" Tristao
- Hugo Taylor
- Jamie Laing
- Louise Thompson
- Mark-Francis Vandelli
- Millie Mackintosh
- Natalya Wolter
- Oliver Proudlock
- Ollie Locke
- Rosie Fortescue
- Spencer Matthews
- Victoria Baker-Harber

== Episodes ==
No. overall	No. in season	Title	Original release date	Duration	UK viewers
9	1	"Capitalism Makes You Beautiful"	19 September 2011	60 minutes	504,000
Binky and Cheska meet Ollie’s new girlfriend, Chloe but are disappointed at Ollie’s lack of compassion towards Gabriella. Elsewhere, Jamie arrives on the scene for Spencer’s birthday, whilst Victoria turns up with an immediate connection with Hugo. Francis and Spencer both compete for Louise’s attention as both try to rekindle an old flame, and Victoria offers Hugo to help her pick models for her swimwear designs. Following rumours that Hugo has cheated, Cheska raises her concerns to Louise, who then tells Millie to watch her back.
10	2	"When I Was Younger I Experimented With Clingfilm"	26 September 2011	60 minutes	530,000
Binky and Cheska are shocked when Gabriella announces she’s making a music video for her new song and casts an Ollie lookalike for it. After confronting Hugo about the rumours she’s heard, Millie quickly ends the relationship leaving Hugo with no choice but to have it out with Cheska for putting the thoughts into Millie’s head. Proving that they don’t have feelings for each other, Spencer and Louise both go looking for dates. Meanwhile, Amber attempts to seduce Francis in order to get him on side for her business ideas, and Caggie returns to comfort Millie.
11	3	"Babe, You're Attituding At Me"	3 October 2011	60 minutes	486,000
Louise finally realises she’s fallen for Spencer again as he prepares to go on a date with Binky, whilst Amber attempts to charm Francis into a business deal. Chloe decides to clear the air with Gabriella but they clash when Chloe walks in on Gabriella filming her new music video with two Ollie lookalikes. Caggie discovers the truth about Hugo’s cheating and tells Millie everything leading to a confrontation between the estranged couple. Elsewhere, on their date, Binky encourages Spencer to make a big decision; Caggie or Louise.
12	4	"No One Likes A Banjo"	10 October 2011	60 minutes	533,000
Cheska reveals her new love interest, Kendall, and Ollie receives a shock when he discovers he was one of his lookalikes for Gabriella’s music video. With Millie not in London anymore, Caggie blames Hugo, whilst Jamie invites a group to his country house for the weekend. Ollie decides to help Amber and Mark-Francis by becoming their model for their jewellery range, Hugo is set up with Gemma, and Jamie tries his luck with Rosie. Elsewhere, Caggie is left confused after a visit from Louise wanting to talk about Spencer, and Francis takes Natalya out on a date.
13	5	"My Mum Sometimes Calls Me Football Head"	17 October 2011	60 minutes	548,000
Louise decides to let her relationship with Spencer fizzle out after seeing him flirting with Caggie again, and Jamie wastes no time in asking her out on a date. Gabriella faces another confrontation with Ollie when he reveals his feelings about her becoming friends with Chloe. Cheska feels betrayed when Binky chooses going to Caggie’s gig over her dinner party, and the pair end up falling out when loyalties are questioned. Hugo finally picks up the courage to apologise to Cheska, Amber lets it slip to Natalya that Francis tried to kiss her, and Spencer is hurt when Proudlock and Caggie kiss.
14	6	"Voulez-Vous Coucher Avec Moi?"	24 October 2011	60 minutes	759,000
Caggie, Louise and Rosie take a trip to Paris to meet Millie and convince her to come back to London, but she still has doubts over her feelings for Hugo. Chloe ends her relationship with Ollie after the pressure gets too much for her, and Gabriella confides in Binky as Ollie blames her for his relationship breaking down. Elsewhere, Louise and Jamie go on a date before she reveals she’ll be moving back to Edinburgh to study, Spencer confesses his love to Caggie but is left disappointed by her reaction, and Hugo’s left in a spin as Millie returns home.
15	7	"You've Gotta Level The Playing Field"	31 October 2011	60 minutes	613,000
Rosie hears shocking news that could change Hugo’s life, but is torn over where her loyalties lie. Caggie welcomes her cousin Alice into the group, and Proudlock immediately takes a shine to her. Hugo discovers the truth from Rosie about Millie cheating on him first, and he heads straights towards his ex-girlfriend to confront her. Elsewhere, Francis hires his new intern, James, and Spencer goes to Binky for advice about Caggie. With an obvious atmosphere between Hugo and Millie at the opera, the pair have a heart-to-heart and agree to be civilised around each other.
16	8	"How Do They Find Flamingo Roadkill?"	7 November 2011	60 minutes	640,000
As the group go to Marrakech for the weekend, Hugo and Rosie remain in London due to work commitments. Caggie begins to feel emotionally drained by Spencer’s continuous quest for her and tells him nothing will ever happen between them. Hugo begins to flirt with Rosie at home, whilst Spencer blames Millie for Hugo not being in Morocco. Despite Caggie’s disapproval, Proudlock asks Alice out for a date, and Binky and Cheska clear the air to become friends again. Elsewhere, Millie questions Rosie over her feelings towards Hugo, and Caggie invites her latest love interest Thomas to Proudlock’s party.
17	9	"Je Suis Amoreuse De Toi"	14 November 2011	60 minutes	667,000
Caggie shows Thomas around London unaware she’s hurting Spencer by doing so, whilst Proudlock and Alice go on their first date on a boat. Determined to make his new book a seller, Ollie questions everyone about when they lost their virginity so he can include it in the novel. Amber arranges a charity night for the Chelsea pensioners and asks Spencer to spread the word leaving Caggie upset as he invites everyone except her. Turning up anyway, Caggie is forced to make a decision about Spencer but he isn’t willing to speak to her, and Millie notices Hugo getting closer to Rosie.
18	10	"Here's To Friendship"	21 November 2011	60 minutes	698,000
With Jamie revealing he’s spent the night with Gabriella, he fears it might affect his relationship with Louise as she returns from Edinburgh. Cheska announces she’s moving in with Ollie but isn’t impressed with Gabriella’s reaction to the news. At Francis and Mark-Francis’ joint birthday party, Millie contemplates telling Hugo she still loves him but is left in tears when Caggie tells her Hugo cheated on her with Rosie when they were together. Spencer finally speaks to Caggie about their situation, and Millie exposes Hugo and Rosie’s affair to a room full of guests.
–	–	"End of Season Party"	28 November 2011	60 minutes	N/A
Presented by Rick Edwards, the cast reunite to discuss events from the series. It also featured appearances from former cast members Agne Motiejunaite and Funda Önal.
19	11	"Christmas Is About Giving And Forgiving"	22 December 2011	90 minutes	N/A
Determined to cheer Rosie up following the revelation of their night together, Hugo organises a trip to Finland for the group but doesn’t invite Millie. Caggie is torn between her loyalties with Millie and pleasing Spencer, whilst Alice demands answers from Proudlock as he ends their brief fling. Caggie and Spencer finally get together, and Louise gives into temptation with Jamie. Back in Chelsea, Jamie hosts a Christmas party where Millie and Rosie eventually set aside their differences and make up, and Caggie and Proudlock’s plans to go to Australia together upset Spencer.

== Ratings ==
Episode	Date	Official E4 rating	E4 weekly rank
Episode 1	19 September 2011	504,000	6
Episode 2	26 September 2011	530,000	2
Episode 3	3 October 2011	486,000	5
Episode 4	10 October 2011	533,000	6
Episode 5	17 October 2011	548,000	8
Episode 6	24 October 2011	759,000	5
Episode 7	31 October 2011	613,000	9
Episode 8	7 November 2011	640,000	9
Episode 9	14 November 2011	667,000	7
Episode 10	21 November 2011	698,000	7
End of Season Party	28 November 2011	–	–
Christmas Special	22 December 2011	–	–
Average		598,000	6
