= Made in Chelsea series 4 =

Made in Chelsea
- Series 4
- No. of episodes: 11

Release
- Original network: E4
- Original release: 15 October – 24 December 2012

Series chronology
- ← Previous; Series 3 Next → Series 5

The fourth series of Made in Chelsea, a British structured-reality television programme, began airing on 15 October 2012 on E4. The series concluded on 17 December 2012 after 10 episodes, however a 60-minute Christmas special episode aired immediately after the series on 24 December 2012, which was then followed by an end of season special presented by Rick Edwards on 31 December 2012 featuring a reunion of the cast to discuss events from the series. The series saw the arrival of several new cast members including Andy Jordan, Ashley James, Carly Rothman, Sam Cussins, Sophia Sassoon, Stevie Johnson and Lucy Watson, as well as the departure of original cast members Fredrik Ferrier and Gabriella Ellis. This series also featured the long triangle between Sophia, Francis and Proudlock, the rivalry between Millie and Victoria increasing, the brief reconnection between Gabriella and Ollie, and the rocky relationship between Spencer and Louise until the revelation that he cheated on her.

== Cast ==
- Alexandra "Binky" Felstead
- Andy Jordan
- Carly Rothman
- Francesca "Cheska" Hull
- Francis Boulle
- Gabriella Ellis
- Ianthe Rose Cochrane-Stack
- Jamie Laing
- Louise Thompson
- Lucy Watson
- Mark-Francis Vandelli
- Millie Mackintosh
- Oliver Proudlock
- Ollie Locke
- Richard Dinan
- Rosie Fortescue
- Sam Cussins
- Sophia Sassoon
- Spencer Matthews
- Stevie Johnson
- Victoria Baker-Harber

== Episodes ==
No. overall	No. in season	Title	Original release date	Duration	UK viewers
30	1	"If You Want To Crack On And Go Head To Head... You'll F****** Lose"	15 October 2012	60 minutes	757,000
The group take a trip to Saint Tropez, and Jamie introduces old friend Andy who shows his interest in wanting to hook up with Louise. Despite recent problems, Spencer announces that he and Louise are still in a solid relationship but he’s not happy when he finds out that Andy has tried it on with her. Elsewhere, back in Chelsea, Richard shows off his new girlfriend Ianthe, and Ollie decides to change his lifestyle and even gets his hair cut. At Jamie’s flat warming party, Spencer interrupts an innocent chat between Andy and Louise and goes off the rails, and Jamie attempts to ask Binky out but is beaten by his old uni friend Sam.
31	2	"The More You Can't Have Someone... You Want Them More"	22 October 2012	60 minutes	685,000
Jamie takes Binky out on a date but is still left confused over his feelings for her, and she has doubts as it may ruin their friendship. Cheska feels nervous as she prepares to go on a double date with Binky, Stevie and Sam, but is more drawn to Sam than Stevie. Ollie is introduced to Ianthe’s friend, Danielle, but it doesn’t go to plan as Ollie doesn’t feel a connection with her. Elsewhere, at Spencer’s birthday party, he plays mind games with Andy as he invites him into the social group, Binky and Jamie finally agree to give things a go, and Gabriella returns.
32	3	"No One You Want At A Party Is Going To Turn Up To A Themed Party, Unless It's Versailles"	29 October 2012	60 minutes	616,000
Following her kiss with Jamie, Binky is left disappointed when he doesn’t call. Spencer continues to make an effort with Andy as he invites him and the boys to play volleyball in Brighton, and Millie welcomes old friend Sophia back to London where she reveals she has a history with both Francis and Spencer. Meanwhile Cheska takes Sam’s number and asks him for a date, but he just wants to be friends, Richard hosts a boat party to launch his new product, and Binky is torn over her situation with Jamie. Getting advice from both Louise and Spencer about it, Binky gives Jamie an ultimatum.
33	4	"I Could Fall In Love With You So Easily.."	5 November 2012	60 minutes	734,000
After recently splitting up with her boyfriend, Gabriella gets close to Ollie again leaving Cheska worried as to whether the estranged couple will reunite. Binky is still left confused by Jamie as he refuses to make any effort with her. At Proudlock’s weekend break, Spencer once again gets the wrong idea about Andy and Louise, and Jamie confesses his love to Binky before laying a kiss on her. The next morning Binky is shocked when Jamie admits it was a mistake, and he faces the wrath of both Ollie and Cheska for hurting her. Meanwhile in an attempt to put his feelings for Louise aside, Andy asks Sophia out on a date.
34	5	"A Man At 23 Is A Bit Like A Girl At 15"	12 November 2012	60 minutes	677,000
Cheska arranges a girls night to cheer Binky up, and Spencer decides to arrange a boys night. Andy goes on his date with Sophia and the pair hit it off, but he soon realises that he still has feelings for Louise. On their respective nights out, Ollie isn’t impressed when he sees Jamie speak to new girl Lucy, whilst Louise is angry when Rosie receives a text saying that Spencer is drunk. After he overhears a conversation about Louise, Spencer has it out with Andy over his feelings towards her. The next day, Sophia is shocked to find out about Andy and Louise, and Jamie is caught on a date with Lucy by Ollie and Cheska.
35	6	"They're Wriggly Little Buggers"	19 November 2012	60 minutes	649,000
Jamie decides to ask Lucy out on another date unaware that she’s double dating Andy and Stevie with Carly. Francis’ feelings for Sophia begin to grow but he’s left heartbroken at the discovery that she’s spent the night with Proudlock. Jamie asks Lucy to be his date for Rosie’s dinner party but she declines, then accepts Andy’s proposal to be his date. Proudlock isn’t impressed when Spencer announces his one night stand with Sophia to all of the guests. With obvious tension in the room, Spencer confronts Andy and Lucy over playing Jamie leading to a huge argument at the dinner table.
36	7	"I Think You've Got The Costume Wrong Tonight Because It's Not Fresh Prince Of Bel-Air"	26 November 2012	60 minutes	754,000
Francis gets increasingly jealous after seeing Sophia and Proudlock together. When Millie and Victoria bump into each other on the street they exchange harsh words, and Victoria is disappointed that Rosie didn’t stick up for her. Jamie has an awkward conversation with Binky’s mum and realises he needs to clear the air with her daughter. Jamie finds out that Lucy has been seeing other men behind his and Andy’s back, and tells others about it, and he faces her wrath when she confronts him about spreading lies. Stevie feels bad after seeing how hurt Francis is over the Sophia situation.
37	8	"I'd Rather Die Than Be Friends With Her"	3 December 2012	60 minutes	648,000
Not happy with Sophia siding with Victoria, Millie questions their friendship. Lucy denies the rumours being spread about her and Andy finds out that Spencer was the one who originally told Jamie. Gabriella and Ollie continue to grow even closer, and Ianthe and Richard’s relationship ends after it hits the rocks. Reality hits home for Sophia when she finally realises that Francis likes her, leaving her with a dilemma over what to do with Proudlock. Louise returns and comes face-to-face with an annoyed Lucy, who then confronts Spencer over his lies about her.
38	9	"If I Wanted To Sleep With Other Girls, I Could"	10 December 2012	60 minutes	744,000
Proudlock begins to notice a change in Sophia as she becomes concerned for Francis’ feelings, whilst Lucy decides to end her brief romance with Andy. Spencer agrees to move in with Francis, Jamie and Proudlock but faces the difficult task of telling Louise. As some of the group go to Amsterdam, Jamie follows to surprise Binky with a heartfelt apology, and Ollie makes a shock announcement that he and Gabriella have slept together. Determined to get over Sophia for good, Francis goes speed dating a meets Ashley, unaware that Sophia has ended her relationship with Proudlock and is ready to confess her feelings to Francis.
39	10	"I Used To Charge Younger Boys For Bunny Cuddles"	17 December 2012	60 minutes	819,000
As Francis and Ashley begin to grow closer, Jamie lets is slip that Sophia and Proudlock have broken up leaving Francis doubting his new forming relationship. Gabriella regrets sleeping with Ollie, thinking their friendship is now over. Spencer is still left torn when Louise attempts to give him an ultimatum over his living arrangements, and Jamie tries to make amends with Louise, however he only makes matters worse. Andy and Binky get close, but then grow apart following their one night stand leaving Binky upset, and knowing he once did the same thing, Jamie feels it’s right to stand up for her.
40	11	"I Didn't Know Reindeers Actually Existed. I Thought They Were, Like, A Mythical Creature"	24 December 2012	60 minutes	746,000
Fredrik gives Francis some advice over his situation with Ashley and Sophia. Louise realises she has serious trust issues with Spencer after a discussion with Jamie, and Gabriella drops a bombshell by announcing that she’s leaving Chelsea before saying an emotional goodbye to Ollie. Francis leaves his date with Ashley to confess his love to Sophia and the pair finally get together, but he then tells Millie and Rosie that he knows Spencer has cheated on Louise. With the information, the pair are quick to reveal the truth to Louise but Spencer denies everything.
–	–	""End of Season Party""	31 December 2012	60 minutes	N/A
Presented by Rick Edwards, the cast reunite to discuss events from the series.

== Ratings ==
Episode	Date	Official E4 rating	E4 weekly rank
Episode 1	15 October 2012	757,000	1
Episode 2	22 October 2012	685,000	3
Episode 3	29 October 2012	616,000	6
Episode 4	5 November 2012	734,000	1
Episode 5	12 November 2012	677,000	8
Episode 6	19 November 2012	649,000	8
Episode 7	26 November 2012	754,000	4
Episode 8	3 December 2012	648,000	6
Episode 9	10 December 2012	744,000	5
Episode 10	17 December 2012	819,000	3
Christmas Special	24 December 2012	746,000	3
End of Season Party	31 December 2012	–	–
Average		712,000	4
