= Riley Uggla =

British-Canadian creative director

- Born: 28 May 1995 (age 29); Toronto, Canada
- Education: Bradfield College; Istituto Marangoni
- Occupation: Creative director
- Television: Made In Chelsea
- Partner: Alex Rimmer (2022–present)

Riley Uggla (/ˈraɪli Uggla; born 28 May 1995) is a creative director and designer. She is the founder of The Condo, an interiors and lifestyle platform, as well as Riley Studio, a sustainable luxury fashion brand.

== Early life ==
Uggla was born in Toronto, Canada and grew up in the United Kingdom. She is the second youngest of four siblings. Uggla studied at Bradfield College, Berkshire, before enrolling in the Foundation in Fashion course at Istituto Marangoni in Shoreditch, London.

== Career ==
In 2014, Uggla began her career as a television personality, best known for her appearance in the Channel 4 series Made in Chelsea.

In August 2018, Uggla founded her first company, Riley Studio. As well as being the founder, Uggla also acted as the creative director of the company and oversaw all design processes and brand direction.

Uggla is the founder and creative director of the lifestyle platform, The Condo.

== Philanthropy ==
The Uggla Foundation was founded in April 2020 by Riley Uggla, her three siblings and their father. The foundation focuses on three main areas: education, health, and access to the arts. One of the first targeted initiatives is the establishment of scholarships for exceptionally talented individuals who do not have the financial means to attend higher education.

The scholarships are awarded through The Uggla Family Scholarship programme at the London School of Economics and Simon Fraser University.

== Personal life ==
Uggla married Alex Rimmer at Blenheim Palace in Oxfordshire. She is the daughter of former CEO of IHS Markit, Lance Uggla.
