= Kimberley Garner =

British actress

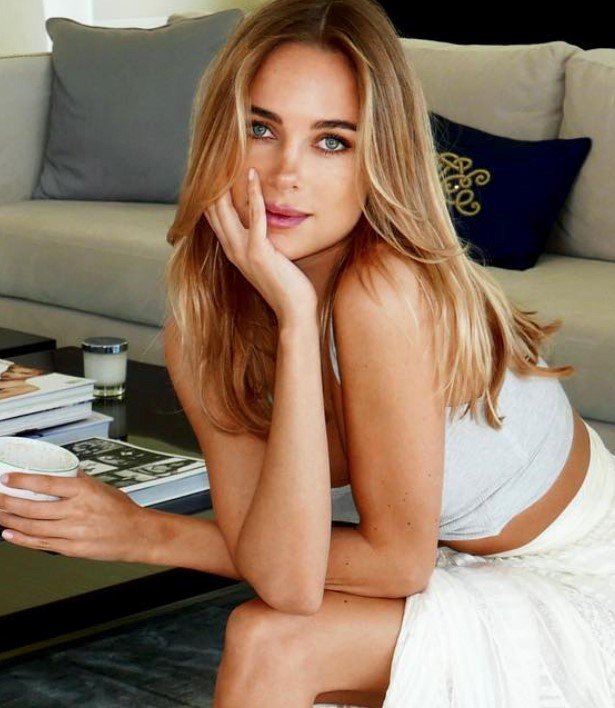
- Born: 10 February 1991 (age 35)
- Occupations: Designer; actress; socialite; television personality; owner of Kimberley London Ltd
- Years active: 2012–present
- Television: Made in Chelsea

Kimberley Garner is an English swimwear designer, property developer, television personality, and actress best known in her home country for her role in the series Made in Chelsea.

== Early life ==
She is the daughter of Russell Garner, a property developer, and Geraldine Garner, and has a brother, Christopher Garner, and a sister, Faye de Pelet. She was educated at St George's School, Ascot, where in the sixth form she took courses in politics, photography, art, and religion. After leaving school, she studied at the London Academy of Music and Dramatic Art and the Royal Academy of Dramatic Art and also took fashion classes. Later, she enrolled at the Lee Strasberg Theatre and Film Institute in West Hollywood, California. A Christian, she was a regular worshipper at Holy Trinity Brompton.

In 2009, Garner sold her first photograph to Country Life.

== Career ==
Garner first came to national attention as a regular cast member of the reality show Made in Chelsea, which she joined in March 2012 and left in November. She also became a property developer in her own right and has been active in that line of work in London and Miami.

Garner started her first business online in 2011. With the proceeds of that, she launched a fashion brand, Kimberley London. She has been a director of Kimberley London Ltd since 2013, and was a director of Young London Events Ltd from 2009 to 2022. In May 2013, her first swimwear collection appeared, to be followed by many others. The lines are all made in London from Italian fabrics. Kimberly London has been promoted almost entirely through social media marketing, and its products are only available online. According to Forbes, Garner is known for her attention to detail.

In 2017, Garner gained the female lead in the Hollywood action movie Sweetheart. In 2018, she appeared on the current affairs show The Wright Stuff to debate fashion with Nina Myskow.

In July 2022, Garner launched a men's swimwear line called 'Sunday For Lovers'. In September, she announced that she was working to create a fashion brand for men called 'Sunday' and planned to manufacture the fabrics for it herself. She commented "The idea is to let women design what they perceive to be flattering for men." Garner also planned to produce matching swimwear for men and women in the "Sunday For Lovers" line.

== Filmography ==
Year	Title	Role	Notes
2012	Made in Chelsea	Self	9 episodes
2018	The Wright Stuff	Self - Panelist	1 episode
2022	The National Television Awards 2022	Self	TV special
