= Funda Önal =

British model and dancer (born 1981)

Funda Önal (born 28 December 1981 in Sheffield, England where she attended Silverdale School) is a British model and dancer. She has appeared in a range of campaigns like Nike and Adidas as well as appearing in music videos for Calvin Harris, Tinie Tempah and Kid Cudi. Önal is also known for appearing in the British reality TV programme Made in Chelsea and played a Beauxbatons student in the film adaptation of Harry Potter and the Goblet of Fire. She has also appeared as a dancer on the X-Factor UK 2010–2011, and played Supergirl and Wonder Babe in comic books for Superheroines.net

Önal is of Turkish descent.
