= Made in Chelsea series 20 =

Made in Chelsea
- Series 20
- No. of episodes: 12

Release
- Original network: E4
- Original release: 28 September – 14 December 2020

Series chronology
- ← Previous; Series 19 Next → Series 21

The twentieth series of Made in Chelsea, a British structured-reality television programme began airing on 28 September 2020 and concluded after twelve episodes on 14 December. Following the suspension of filming of the previous series due to the COVID-19 pandemic, it was announced that the cast would be following government guidelines whilst filming this series. Some of the cast moved into country houses located in Surrey where they were quarantined together, whilst the others filmed with social distancing to protect cast and crew. The series ended with a special "Made in Chelsea: The Wedding" episode focused on the wedding of Ollie and Gareth, which was brought forward following the announcement of the second national lockdown.

During the series it was confirmed that cast member Miles Nazaire had taken a break from the show. New cast members for this series include former Love Island contestant Charlie Frederick, as well as Paris Smith, Ruby Adler and Will Higginson. James Taylor and Maeva D'Ascanio also returned to the show following their short break, whilst former cast member Alexandra "Binky" Felstead made a brief return for the series finale.

The series focused heavily on the unstable relationship between Sam and Zara following a confession of infidelity, as well as a blossoming romance between Olivia and Tristan despite numerous obstacles. It also included Emily torn between her best friend and a new love interest, and the Gareth and Ollie desperately trying to plan the wedding of their dreams despite COVID-19 restrictions.

== Cast ==
- Alex Mytton
- Alexandra "Binky" Felstead
- Amelia Mist
- Charlie Frederick
- Emily Blackwell
- Freddie Browne
- Fredrik Ferrier
- Gareth Locke
- Harry Baron
- Harvey Armstrong
- James Taylor
- Jamie Laing
- Jane Felstead
- Louise Thompson
- Maeva D'Ascanio
- Mark-Francis Vandelli
- Melissa Tattam
- Olivia Bentley
- Ollie Locke
- Paris Smith
- Reza Amiri-Garroussi
- Rosi Mai Waldon
- Ruby Adler
- Sam Holmes
- Sam Thompson
- Sophie “Habbs” Habboo
- Sophie Hermann
- Tiff Watson
- Tristan Phipps
- Verity Scarlett Bowditch
- Victoria Baker-Harber
- Will Higginson
- Zara McDermott

== Episodes ==
No. overall	No. in season	Title	Original release date	Duration	UK viewers
237	1	"3AM Is Prime Time Booty Call"	28 September 2020	60 minutes	686,000
Sam is torn over whether to tell Zara about Tiff’s behaviour around him, or keep the peace. Verity notices a spark between Freddie and new girl Paris, whilst Gareth and Ollie announce they’ve postponed their wedding due to Covid. Zara rages to hear that Tiff has interfered in her relationship again and seeks advice from Melissa. Elsewhere Gareth proposes the idea of a low-key wedding to a disappointed Ollie, and Tristan and Verity have a civil conversation about their break-up. Mark Francis shows off his new home, Zara confronts Tiff, and Olivia throws Melissa under the bus.
238	2	"You’re Leaving A Couple Of Vipers For Another Couple Of Vipers"	5 October 2020	60 minutes	722,000
Tristan and Verity agree to have mutual respect for each other, whilst Ollie and Gareth struggle to agree whilst planning the perfect wedding. Zara confronts Melissa over comments made about her, and Melissa is shocked to find that Tiff has deleted her messages to cover her own back. Emily is taken aback when Harvey confesses that he loves her, Verity shares a kiss with Holmes, and Zara and Tiff put the past behind them. Tristan jumps to the wrong conclusion and accuses Charlie of kissing his ex-girlfriend, and Ollie agrees to a small romantic wedding with Gareth.
239	3	"With Great Rig Comes Great Responsibility"	12 October 2020	60 minutes	721,000
James and Maeva return and are immediately filled in on all the gossip – including Olivia and Tristan’s drunken kiss. Melissa offers an olive branch to Zara and vows to work on mending their broken friendship, meanwhile Verity is forced to let down Holmes gently when she realises it’s Charlie who she holds a torch for. Maeva and Verity’s feud is reignited when the pair come face-to-face, and Ollie double books Sophie on two blind dates in order to find her the man of her dreams. Elsewhere Olivia and Verity come to blows when a conversation about Tristan turns heated.
240	4	"I Did Something Really Bad"	19 October 2020	60 minutes	728,000
Sam and Zara’s relationship is blown apart following her confession of cheating. Elsewhere Amelia urges Verity to pursue Charlie further, and Sophie goes on a second date with Will. Verity and Tristan meet up to have a rare civilised conversation, whilst Jamie tells Sam to find the strength to break up with Zara for good. Olivia agrees to be a bridesmaid at Ollie and Gareth’s wedding, Tristan lashes out at Charlie, and Olivia and Verity clear the air. Zara lays her heart on the line as she desperately pleads with Sam to forgive her infidelity.
241	5	"You're My Friend, But I Also Quite Wanna Kiss You"	26 October 2020	60 minutes	735,000
With Zara still reeling from her break-up with Sam, Melissa drops another bombshell about Sam and Tiff’s suspicious behaviour together. Tristan rejects advances from Paris in order to focus his energy on Olivia instead, whilst Sophie admits there’s no spark between her and Will. Tiff is fuming to hear that Melissa had meddled in her friendship with Zara, meanwhile Harvey tells Emily they’re moving too quickly when she discusses buying a house together. Habbs is overwhelmed when Jamie surprises her with a homemade gift, and Melissa feels the wrath of Tiff.
242	6	"Once The Sex Is Gone, The Relationship Is Gone"	2 November 2020	60 minutes	775,000
Maeva discusses her sex life with the girls before Emily reports back to James. Olivia worries that she may be Tristan’s rebound, whilst Ollie and Gareth face another setback when they discover the venue they had in mind for their wedding won’t accept gay marriages. Elsewhere Freddie’s dinner party descends into chaos as Maeva goes on the warpath with Emily, and Verity and Olivia take swipe at each other. Zara is left broken when Reza tells her that Sam can’t find it in his heart to forgive her, and Tristan takes a risk by asking Olivia on a date.
243	7	"I Can Get Hard If You Need Me To, Clive"	9 November 2020	60 minutes	753,000
The group arrive back in Chelsea where Olivia and Tristan’s holiday romance fizzles out. Sam tries to get his friendship with Tiff back on track, whilst Verity seeks advice from her mother about dating Charlie. Olivia and Will share a spark before agreeing to go on a date together, and Verity revels in breaking the news to Tristan about it. James and Maeva realise they’re on different pages in terms of their relationship, and the pressure is on for Charlie as Verity introduces him to her Mum. Elsewhere Tristan seeks answers from Olivia when he confronts her about her date with Will.
244	8	"You Get Angry At The Sound Of Your Own Voice"	16 November 2020	60 minutes	830,000
James worries that he may have made the wrong decision by moving in with Maeva. Tristan vows to fight for Olivia after hearing that Will wants to pursue her further, whilst Paris breaks some bad news to Verity regarding Charlie. Maeva flips out when James reveals his concerns about the pace of their relationship, Charlie is forced into a confession by Verity, and Tiff and Sam continue to work on rebuilding their friendship. Tristan opens up to Olivia about his feelings for her, but she’s fearful he may not be over his ex-girlfriend Verity yet. Elsewhere Verity shares a secret with the girls.
245	9	"Crumbs"	23 November 2020	60 minutes	860,000
Whilst some of the group head off to Cornwall, Emily looks forward to remaining in Chelsea to spend some quality time with Harvey before they move in together. Will gives Olivia his blessing to see how things progress with Tristan, and Ollie and Gareth finally agree that they both want children in the future. Olivia’s happiness is short lived when she hears that Tristan has been making sexual advances towards Verity, Emily is furious when Harvey ditches her to spend time in Cornwall with his friends, and James and Maeva’s time apart does them the world of good.
246	10	"She Just Got A Bit Over Familiar"	30 November 2020	60 minutes	759,000
Sam finally agrees to meet up with Zara again where she begs him for his forgiveness, and Verity’s intentions are questioned as she’s accused of deliberately sabotaging Tristan’s romance with Olivia. Harvey and Habbs agree to be civil, and Tristan and Olivia agree to focus on each other and not to let anybody else interfere. Harvey decides to head back to Chelsea admitting he’s uncomfortable with how flirty Habbs has been around him, but she has a very different version of events. Meanwhile Tristan pushes Verity away in order to salvage what he has with Olivia.
247	11	"Ctrl + Alt + Delete Habbs"	7 December 2020	60 minutes	748,000
Olivia and Tristan get cosy on their official first date. Paris gives Verity some harsh home truths, Sophie worries she may never find love, and Sam shares a secret with Tiff about spending the night with Zara. Emily is enraged when Tiff tells Habbs’ side of the story from Cornwall, but Harvey is quick to deny being inappropriate. Elsewhere Gareth and Ollie’s wedding approaches, Olivia meets with Verity for answers, and Sam pleads with Zara to give him more space. Emily decides to back her boyfriend and calls out Habbs on her behaviour.
248	12	"From Thursday… Stay Home. Protect The NHS. Save Lives"	14 December 2020	60 minutes	3,435,000
With two days to go until the second national lockdown, the race is on for Ollie and Gareth to plan their dream wedding. James promises a future with Maeva, whilst Emily works on her relationship with Harvey rather than allow her feud with Habbs to get in the way of love. Elsewhere Sam admits he’s not ready to let Zara go before suggesting their give things another go, and Tristan and Olivia agree to be exclusive. Binky returns to witness Ollie and Gareth’s big day, and emotions run high as the happy couple finally tie the knot.

== Ratings ==
Catch-up service totals were added to the official ratings.

Episode	Date	Total E4 viewers	Total E4 weekly rank
Episode 1	28 September 2020	686,000	1
Episode 2	5 October 2020	722,000	1
Episode 3	12 October 2020	721,000	1
Episode 4	19 October 2020	728,000	1
Episode 5	26 October 2020	735,000	1
Episode 6	2 November 2020	775,000	1
Episode 7	9 November 2020	753,000	1
Episode 8	16 November 2020	830,000	1
Episode 9	23 November 2020	860,000	1
Episode 10	30 November 2020	759,000	2
Episode 11	7 December 2020	748,000	1
Episode 12	14 December 2020	3,435,000	1
Average		100,6000	1
