= Made in Chelsea series 21 =

Made in Chelsea
- Series 21
- No. of episodes: 12

Release
- Original network: E4
- Original release: 29 March – 14 June 2021

Series chronology
- ← Previous; Series 20 Next → Series 22

The twenty-first series of Made in Chelsea, a British structured-reality television programme began airing on 29 March 2021, and concluded after twelve episodes on 14 June. Due to the COVID-19 pandemic, like the previous series it was announced that the cast would be following government guidelines whilst filming this series, with some of the cast moving into country houses located in the Cotswolds and Suffolk where they were quarantined together. The series ended with an episode back in its usual location in Chelsea.

Ahead of the series it was announced that Miles Nazaire and Julius Cowdrey would be returning to the show, whilst Victoria Baker-Harber returned for the series finale. With the series being filmed away from its usual location, it featured a number of notable absences from the regular cast including Amelia Mist, Freddie Browne, Harry Baron, Melissa Tattam and Zara McDermott. Instead, joining the cast was Eloise St. Clair-Charles, Inga Valentiner and Robbie Mullett, whilst Tom Zanetti also made several appearances.

== Cast ==
- Alex Mytton
- Eloise St. Clair-Charles
- Emily Blackwell
- Fredrik Ferrier
- Gareth Locke
- Harvey Armstrong
- Inga Valentiner
- James Taylor
- Julius Cowdrey
- Maeva D'Ascanio
- Mark-Francis Vandelli
- Miles Nazaire
- Olivia Bentley
- Ollie Locke
- Paris Smith
- Reza Amiri-Garroussi
- Robbie Mullett
- Ruby Adler
- Sam Thompson
- Sophie “Habbs” Habboo
- Sophie Hermann
- Tiff Watson
- Tom Zanetti
- Tristan Phipps
- Verity Scarlett Bowditch
- Victoria Baker-Harber

== Episodes ==
No. overall	No. in season	Title	Original release date	Duration	UK viewers
249	1	"It’s Just… Lighting The Match"	29 March 2021	60 minutes	588,000
The gang arrive in a country mansion in the Cotswolds, where James instantly becomes wary of Maeva spending time with her ex-boyfriend Miles. Julius and Olivia’s feud is reignited when the pair accuse each other of damaging their past friendship, and Ruby is uncomfortable when Miles makes comments to her about Reza. Tiff fears that Miles is playing with fire by pursuing Ruby, whilst James also feels his toes are being stepped on when he discovers Maeva and Miles have been reminiscing. Ollie and Gareth announce they’re moving forward with their surrogacy, and Sam gives Miles some home truths.
250	2	"Stop Spitting On My Mink!"	5 April 2021	60 minutes	640,000
James feels ostracised when he catches Maeva and Miles having another conversation in French, and Reza wants to reignite the lost spark with Ruby. Julius is a shoulder to cry on for Olivia following a tiff with Tristan. Sophie tells James that Maeva has been instigating the flirting between her and Miles, whilst Tristan accuses Julius of wanting Olivia for himself. Maeva is furious to find out that Sophie has spoken to James about Miles, and the pair eventually come to blows when Maeva warns Sophie to stop meddling in her relationship.
251	3	"Julius Is Nursing A Semi"	12 April 2021	60 minutes	649,000
Julius confides in Fred about wanting to pursue Sophie, but he’s too late when Tom Zanetti arrives as her birthday surprise. Miles strongly denies having inappropriate conversations with Maeva, whilst Ruby tells Reza she needs to take some time out from their relationship following another argument. Maeva is furious with James for not taking her accusations against Miles seriously, Habbs returns to support Ruby, and Sophie is delighted as to how well Tom has integrated into the group. Elsewhere Reza receives backlash from the girls, where Tiff feels he still holds resentment towards Ruby for her past mistakes.
252	4	"I Don’t Play Hard To Get"	19 April 2021	60 minutes	616,000
Tiff’s friend Inga arrives at the country mansion, where Julius and Miles compete for her attention after realising they’ve both hooked up with her in the past. Tom is grilled about his romance with smitten Sophie before heading back home to Leeds, whilst Habbs is uncomfortable with the arrival of Harvey and Emily. Inga spends the night with Miles before telling Julius she’s still keeping her options open, meanwhile Reza receives words of wisdom from Sam, and Olivia and Tristan pack their bags after another argument. Elsewhere Habbs tries to build bridges with Emily, and Julius accuses Inga of playing both him and Miles.
253	5	"I’ve Had More Comfortable Gynaecological Appointments"	26 April 2021	60 minutes	700,000
Inga fears Miles is distancing himself from her following her confrontation with Julius. Olivia is shocked to hear that Emily doesn’t believe her and Tristan are compatible together as a couple, whilst Julius believes Inga is driving a wedge between him and Miles with damaging lies. Elsewhere Verity arrives to make peace, Tristan challenges Emily on her opinions about him, and Harvey receives a raunchy anniversary surprise. Olivia stands by Tristan when her relationship comes under fire, and there’s further conflict between Julius and Inga when the pair come face-to-face.
254	6	"The Thing With You Maeva Is You’re Just Slightly Misunderstood"	3 May 2021	60 minutes	760,000
Verity turns down an invitation to girls’ night to avoid further confrontation with Maeva, meanwhile alarm bells ring for Miles when he catches Inga flirting with Alex. Ruby is put in an awkward situation when Miles’ dad wrongly assumes she’s his new girlfriend during their video call, and girls’ night descends into chaos when Emily faces the wrath of both Olivia and Maeva. Elsewhere Harvey attempts to resolve Emily’s conflict, Olivia believes Maeva and James are their only allies, and Inga notices a spark between Miles and Ruby.
255	7	"I’m Coming From A Good Place… For Once"	10 May 2021	60 minutes	792,000
Maeva warns Inga to steer clear of Miles before twisting the knife further by telling her about comments he’s made to Ruby. Tiff desperately tries to bring Emily and Olivia closer again, whilst Paris and Verity agree to build bridges, and Reza returns to surprise his girlfriend. Deciding it’s not worth the agro, Miles and Inga put an end to their brief romance, and James worries that Maeva is deliberately causing trouble for her ex. Elsewhere; Reza is taken aback when Maeva fills him in on Miles and Ruby’s growing friendship - leaving her with a lot of explaining to do.
256	8	"We Just Had A Nice Friendly Jacuzzi… What’s Up With That?"	17 May 2021	60 minutes	752,000
Verity drops a bombshell that she’s shared inappropriate messages with Reza in the past despite him being in a relationship with Ruby. Olivia hatches a plan to get Maeva and Emily back on speaking terms, whilst Tiff approaches Tristan on comments made about her. Elsewhere Reza pleads his innocence, Miles pushes Inga away, and Ruby accuses Verity’s intentions of being malicious. Ollie and Gareth share some surrogate news, and Ruby assures Reza that she doesn’t believe he’s in the wrong with regards to Verity’s allegations.
257	9	"I’m Moody, If You’re Broody"	24 May 2021	60 minutes	763,000
The arrival of Ruby’s friend Eloise leaves a bitter taste in Inga’s mouth when Miles’ attention goes to her instead, and Harvey panics when Emily suggests children to him. Inga marks her territory by warning Eloise about Miles, but it’s Julius who catches her eye. Elsewhere, Harvey reaches a compromise with Emily regarding their future, Gareth plans a fundraiser for Alzheimer's in honour of his mother, and James wins control of the Tricep Trio in the charity raffle. Meanwhile, Inga and Paris are taken aback when Eloise’s remarks about them are made public knowledge.
258	10	"Hurry Up And Break Up With Your Boyfriend"	31 May 2021	60 minutes	864,000
Tristan and Olivia’s latest break-up divides the group, whilst Maeva declares war on Eloise, and Miles praises Ruby for her recent independence. Harvey’s private conversation with Reza about his troubles with Emily is relayed back to, but it’s Reza who come under scrutiny for twisting the truth. Robbie confides in Ollie about his sexuality, Tristan and Olivia reconcile, and Reza is excited for his future with Ruby, completely unaware that she’s planning on drawing a line under their relationship for good.
259	11	"I Will Skateboard On Your Head"	7 June 2021	60 minutes	808,000
Reza admits to Olivia that he’s uncomfortable with Miles and Ruby’s growing friendship. Miles seeks advice from his father regarding pursuing Ruby despite her turbulent relationship with Reza, and Sophie is delighted when Tom surprises her for a weekend of romance. Maeva is irritated when Inga takes James out for some skateboarding lessons, meanwhile Ruby makes a decision, and Olivia and Tristan reminisce. Reza is knocked for six when Ruby tells him they need to go their separate ways, and it’s not long before Miles swoops in to offer her his support.
260	12	"Prince Charmings Will Come And Go… But I’ll Always Be There"	14 June 2021	60 minutes	762,000
Ruby is forced to defend herself when Maeva accuses her of breaking up with Reza because she has feelings for Miles instead. Sophie announces that her and Tom have split, and Fred is there to pick up the pieces. Elsewhere Ollie and Gareth prepare for the next chapter in their life, Tristan delivers some home truths to Miles regarding Ruby, and Mark Francis has a long overdue catch-up with Victoria. As Reza is encouraged to move on from by relationship by Sam, Ruby agrees to go on a date with Miles.

== Ratings ==
Catch-up service totals were added to the official ratings.

Episode	Date	Total E4 viewers	Total E4 weekly rank
Episode 1	29 March 2021	588,000	6
Episode 2	5 April 2021	640,000	6
Episode 3	12 April 2021	649,000	6
Episode 4	19 April 2021	616,000	4
Episode 5	26 April 2021	700,000	2
Episode 6	3 May 2021	760,000	2
Episode 7	10 May 2021	792,000	1
Episode 8	17 May 2021	752,000	1
Episode 9	24 May 2021	763,000	1
Episode 10	31 May 2021	864,000	1
Episode 11	7 June 2021	808,000	1
Episode 12	14 June 2021	762,000	1
Average		725,000	3
