= Made in Chelsea series 22 =

Made in Chelsea
- Series 22
- No. of episodes: 12

Release
- Original network: E4
- Original release: 11 September – 27 December 2021

Series chronology
- ← Previous; Series 21 Next → Series 23

The twenty-second series of Made in Chelsea, a British structured-reality television programme began airing on 11 October 2021, and concluded after twelve episodes on 27 December. Unlike the previous two series, the cast were back in its usual location of Chelsea without having to quarantine together due to the government guidelines and restrictions for the COVID-19 pandemic being dropped in the UK.

The series included a couple of new cast members including Nicole Berry and Sarrah Jasmin, as well as the return of former cast Angus Findlay, Digby Edgley and Sam Prince. They replace Alex Mytton who did not return for this series. The series heavily focused on the love triangle between Ruby, Reza and Miles, as well Olivia and Tristan getting back together, and Inga exploring her sexuality. It also featured bumps in the roads for both James and Maeva, and Emily and Harvey.

== Cast ==
- Angus Findlay
- Digby Edgley
- Emily Blackwell
- Fredrik Ferrier
- Gareth Locke
- Harvey Armstrong
- Inga Valentiner
- James Taylor
- Julius Cowdrey
- Maeva D'Ascanio
- Mark-Francis Vandelli
- Miles Nazaire
- Nicole Berry
- Olivia Bentley
- Ollie Locke
- Paris Smith
- Reza Amiri-Garroussi
- Robbie Mullett
- Ruby Adler
- Sam Prince
- Sam Thompson
- Sarrah Jasmin
- Sophie “Habbs” Habboo
- Sophie Hermann
- Tiff Watson
- Tristan Phipps
- Verity Scarlett Bowditch
- Victoria Baker-Harber

== Episodes ==
No. overall	No. in season	Title	Original release date	Duration	UK viewers
261	1	"Did You Miss Me A Little Bit?"	11 October 2021	60 minutes	868,000
Sam T warns Reza to be careful when he admits he’s still in love with his ex-girlfriend Ruby and has been meeting up with her in secret. Ollie and Gareth receive some heart-breaking news regarding their surrogacy, whilst Olivia feels disrespected when Tristan brings another girl to an event. Elsewhere, Ruby agrees to go on a date with Miles, Maeva addresses the problems in her relationship, and Paris is set up on a blind date with Angus. Reza and Miles face off as the competition over Ruby escalates further, and Maeva has a big decision to make.
262	2	"You’re Literally Pouring Gasoline On The Fire"	18 October 2021	60 minutes	696,000
James takes a huge risk with Maeva by breaking up with her, but is left hurt when she doesn’t fight for their relationship. Julius asks newly single Verity out on a date, meanwhile Olivia feels isolated when she finds out Emily is meeting up with Nicole, the girl Tristan has been dating. Digby returns and issues Maeva with an ultimatum after discovering incriminating conversations between her and Miles, Olivia asks Tristan to consider her feelings when taking things further with Nicole, and Ruby fears that Reza has taken their friendship out of context.
263	3	"I Think You’re Dismissed Now"	25 October 2021	60 minutes	838,000
Olivia defends James against Maeva stating that she needs to make an effort to reconnect with him or risk losing him forever. Emily and Harvey’s relationship is thrown into turmoil when she receives an image of him getting close to another girl, meanwhile Paris learns that Angus may not be as honest as she first thought. Just as Maeva backs down to James, she discovers the worst possible betrayal. Paris and Inga get their own back on Angus, and Verity places Julius firmly in the friend zone. James accuses Miles of being the reason for his failed love life, whilst Maeva promises revenge.
264	4	"Trust Is Built In Droplets And Lost In Buckets"	1 November 2021	60 minutes	806,000
Maeva sets the wheels in motion to use Miles to get back at James, whilst Angus begs for forgiveness from Paris. Ruby feels uncomfortable with Miles and Maeva’s new friendship, and Olivia realises Tristan has played down his romance with Nicole for his own gain. As Maeva sinks her claws into Miles he discovers he’s been used as a pawn in her game. Elsewhere Emily’s friend Sarrah catches the eyes of some of the boys, Inga considers dating Digby, Maeva comes to a shocking realisation over James, and Olivia drops a bombshell about Tristan.
265	5	"I Want A Man Who Buys Me Diamonds, Not Silver"	8 November 2021	60 minutes	698,000
Maeva has some grovelling to do and starts by apologising to Miles for using him, meanwhile Emily moves out to give Harvey some space following a number of disagreements. Olivia and Nicole team up to challenge Tristan on his recent behaviour, whilst Sophie advises Julius on how to date, and Miles cuts all ties with Maeva. Ruby lashes out at Sarrah after discovering her attraction to Reza, and Harvey and Emily fail to reach a compromise. Sam T issues Tristan with some harsh home truths regarding Olivia, and James and Maeva start fresh.
266	6	"My Heart Was Made Into Beef Carpaccio"	15 November 2021	60 minutes	736,000
Olivia is torn with how to handle her situation with Tristan when she concludes that she’s still in love with him. Digby receives the green light to ask Inga out on a date unaware she’s decided to pursue girls instead, and Harvey is rattled when Miles takes Emily out for dinner in an attempt to raise her spirits. Elsewhere Sarrah tells Reza she’d rather back off than step on Ruby’s toes, and Olivia meets with Tristan to rekindle their relationship. Reza and Ruby come to blows once again, whilst Emily and Harvey put the past behind them. Olivia fears her friends won’t support her decision to take back Tristan.
267	7	"If They Get Married I Will Eat My Own Scrotum"	22 November 2021	60 minutes	699,000
Olivia begs Ollie to support her and Tristan’s journey as a couple again, whilst Ruby is overjoyed when a spark with Miles is reignited. Victoria asks Mark Francis to invest more time in his god-daughter, Ollie struggles to see a happy ending for Olivia and Tristan, and Maeva and James decide to spice up their sex life. Robbie opens up about losing his virginity, and Miles pulls out all the stops in order to make his first date with Ruby a special one. Elsewhere Tristan makes a promise to Olivia’s friends in order to prove to them how much he loves her.
268	8	"This Is A Very Big Red Flag In Front Of A Very Scary Bull"	29 November 2021	60 minutes	699,000
Reza is confused to learn about Ruby’s date with Miles after believing she still had strong feelings for him. Angus spots a shock connection between Digby and Verity and encourages them to act on it, meanwhile Julius and Nicole get cosy, and Inga experiments with dating women. Maeva flips when reminded of James and Verity’s past, and Olivia is fuming with Ruby for flaunting her new romance with Miles in front of everyone. Digby goes against James and Maeva’s advice and asks Verity out on a date regardless, whilst Olivia urges Reza to fight for Ruby.
269	9	"I’m Sorry For Having A Moment Of Weakness"	6 December 2021	60 minutes	695,000
Julius is hurt when he’s told that Nicole has been dating other people, and Olivia comes up with a plan for Reza and Ruby to both get the closure they need. Maeva is determined to scupper Verity’s date with Digby so decides to set him up on a blind date with Nicole instead. A plan backfires when Reza and Ruby end up in more turmoil than they were in before, and Miles feels like a fool when he learns the true extent to Ruby’s feelings towards her ex. Maeva takes great pleasure in telling Verity about Digby's date with Nicole, meanwhile Inga and Ella share a kiss.
270	10	"Big Dig Energy"	13 December 2021	60 minutes	565,000
Ruby continues to feed Miles with lies about her and Reza despite him demanding to know the truth. Digby asks Julius for his approval to date both Verity and Nicole to find out which one he has a stronger connection with, whilst Inga realises she wants to invest her time in getting to know Sam Prince more rather than pursue things with Ella. Ruby finally opens up to Reza about her intention of wanting to make things work with him again, and Verity wins in the battle for Digby. Ruby has some explaining to do as she’s finally honest with Miles about Reza, whilst Inga comes out as bisexual to her father.
271	11	"I Didn’t Realise How Well Endowed You Were"	20 December 2021	60 minutes	566,000
As Digby focuses on getting to know Verity better, he’s unaware she doesn’t think there’s any chemistry between them. Reza reaches a good place with Ruby, but past messages from Inga threaten to put a spanner in the works. Elsewhere Paris confides in Olivia and Robbie about dating as a woman of colour, Sam P and Verity’s spark doesn’t go unnoticed by the group, and Ruby isn’t happy with Reza for not having her support as she confronts Inga. Sam P pleads his innocence with Inga, and Ruby has a decision to make.
272	12	"Secrets Are Good"	27 December 2021	60 minutes	TBA
Sam P takes Verity out on a date but asks her to keep it between themselves, meanwhile Inga considers taking him back following his grand gesture. Paris is overjoyed to be accepted by her new boyfriend’s family, and Sam T gives Ruby an ultimatum over her future with Reza. Inga and Verity see red when they both realise they’ve been played off each other by Sam P, Ruby tells Reza she doesn’t want a relationship with him, and Ollie and Gareth share some heart-warming news with Olivia. Elsewhere, Sam faces the wrath of Inga and Verity.

== Ratings ==
Catch-up service totals were added to the official ratings.

Episode	Date	Total E4 viewers	Total E4 weekly rank
Episode 1	11 October 2021	686,000	7
Episode 2	18 October 2021	696,000	6
Episode 3	25 October 2021	838,000	6
Episode 4	1 November 2021	806,000	6
Episode 5	8 November 2021	698,000	7
Episode 6	15 November 2021	736,000	3
Episode 7	22 November 2021	699,000	1
Episode 8	29 November 2021	699,000	1
Episode 9	6 December 2021	695,000	1
Episode 10	13 December 2021	565,000	1
Episode 11	20 December 2021	566,000	3
Episode 12	27 December 2021		
Average			
