= Made in Chelsea series 17 =

Made in Chelsea
- Series 17
- No. of episodes: 13

Release
- Original network: E4
- Original release: 25 March – 17 June 2019

Series chronology
- ← Previous; Series 16 Next → Series 18

The seventeenth series of Made in Chelsea, a British structured-reality television programme began airing on 25 March 2019, and concluded on 17 June 2019 following thirteen episodes, making this the longest series to date. Ahead of the series it was announced that Sam Thompson, Louise Thompson, Ryan Libbey, Ollie Locke, Emily Blackwell, Tristan Phipps and Heloise "Ell" Agostinelli had decided to quit the series, and was the first series to include new cast members Amelia Mist, Angus Findlay, Freddie Browne, Hugo Leefe, Maeva D'Ascanio, Ollie Buck, Rosi Mai Waldon, Sammy Allsop and Verity Scarlett Bowditch.

This series focused on the tit-for-tat behaviour between exes Miles and Maeva. It also included Amelia and Verity on the quest for love, Jamie and Habbs realising they have fallen for each other before facing a number of difficulties, and the breakdown of Miles and James's friendship following the ultimate betrayal.

== Cast ==
- Alex Mytton
- Amelia Mist
- Angus Findlay
- Digby Edgley
- Eliza Batten
- Freddie Browne
- Fredrik Ferrier
- Harry Baron
- Hugo Leefe
- James Taylor
- Jamie Laing
- Maeva D'Ascanio
- Mark-Francis Vandelli
- Melissa Tattam
- Miles Nazaire
- Oliver Proudlock
- Olivia Bentley
- Ollie Buck
- Rosi Mai Waldon
- Sammy Allsop
- Sophie “Habbs” Habboo
- Sophie Hermann
- Verity Bowditch
- Victoria Baker-Harber

== Episodes ==
No. overall	No. in season	Title	Original release date	Duration	UK viewers
203	1	"We Do Complicated, Don't We?"	25 March 2019	60 minutes	750,000
Miles is put in a difficult situation when he comes face-to-face with Amelia, a girl who he has history with. Elsewhere Jamie and Alex get friendly with Verity, aware that she’s been recently dating James. Things go from bad to worse for Miles when his ex-girlfriend Maeva moves to Chelsea for work, but a spark is reignited. James surprises Eliza with a trip to Paris, unaware that Verity is migrating into the friendship group. Habbs catches the eye of Angus, Sophie celebrates her birthday in style, and Verity and Eliza confront James as they realise he’s been playing them both.
204	2	"You Showed My Friend’s Mum Your Testicle"	1 April 2019	60 minutes	767,000
James wants to make amends with Eliza, but his attempt at an apology backfires. Miles confides in the boys that he’s recently been hooking up with other girls as well as Maeva, then Angus wastes no time in telling Maeva about Miles’s betrayal before swooping in and agreeing to go on a date with her himself. Meanwhile Habbs is forced to give Miles some tough love to try and make him change his ways around women, but he makes an alarming discovery about Angus and Maeva going behind his back. Elsewhere Mark Francis makes some new friends, and James receives a taste of his own medicine when Verity dates Fred.
205	3	"She's Like A Little Slippery Eel"	8 April 2019	60 minutes	676,000
Habbs makes it clear that she’s not a fan of the way Maeva has dealt with the situation with Miles, whilst James’s attention turns to Rosi. Melissa is far from happy to hear that her ex-boyfriend Ollie is back on the scene, and Verity decides to stir things up between James and Rosi. Habbs and Maeva exchange some harsh words in a heated debate, Melissa confronts Ollie after hearing he’s been bad mouthing her relationship, and James agrees to just be “friends” with Verity. Elsewhere Digby returns home from New York, and Angus sees Maeva’s true colours as she cancels her date with him.
206	4	"I Was Like The Funny Nice Douche, He’s Just A Douche"	15 April 2019	60 minutes	681,000
Amelia organises a girls day out for Maeva after realising she’s feeling low about her love life. James worries that his new friendship with Verity will inevitably lead to them catching feelings again, whilst Jamie continues to defend Verity when he fears that James doesn’t really care about her. Elsewhere Freddie’s attempt at dating doesn’t go to plan, Maeva finally receives some closure after pouring her heart out to Miles, and James and Jamie come to blows at Alex’s poker night. Mark Francis is put out of his comfort zone, and Verity has a life changing decision to make.
207	5	"This Boy Is Getting In Between Our Friendship"	22 April 2019	60 minutes	583,000
Habbs arranges a trip to the country for some of the group, but she opens up old wounds by not extending the invitation to Digby. James makes a U-turn by deciding he now wants Verity in his life, but feels he may have left it too late when he notices a connection between her and Freddie. Digby and Maeva bond over their mutual hatred of Habbs, whilst Olivia gets upset when she realises that her boyfriend and best friend will never get along. Feeling he’s getting nowhere with Verity, James agrees to date Rosi instead, Mark Francis offers Jamie a helping hand, and Habbs confronts Digby and Maeva over their comments about her.
208	6	"She’s A Very Odd Bird"	29 April 2019	60 minutes	689,000
Miles wants to get back into the dating game and sees the perfect opportunity to pursue Eliza’s friend Sammy. Maeva reaches out to Digby for some personal training sessions but he’s unaware of her ulterior motive. Rosi rages with James when he invites Miles and Sammy onto their date, whilst Eliza confesses to recently hooking up with James. Digby feels uncomfortable when he realises Maeva has other intentions with him, leaving Olivia no choice but to challenge her. James is hot topic of conversation between Verity, Rosi and Eliza as they all discover they’ve been played, meanwhile Melissa goes to Mark Francis for clothing brand advice.
209	7	"Can We Have Another Sexual Revolution Please?”"	6 May 2019	60 minutes	671,000
Jamie’s friends rally round him to offer their support when he announces he’s broken up with his girlfriend. James isn’t happy when he hears that Miles has taken swipe at his dating situation. Elsewhere Olivia struggles with her personal insecurities, James tells Sammy some home truths about Miles, and Maeva attempts to move on with her life. Sammy reveals she’s having doubts following her conversation with James, leaving Miles on the warpath. Meanwhile Digby reassures Olivia, and Alex arranges a special dinner for Jamie in order to boost his spirits.
210	8	"I Need To Find A Tree And Feed It Chocolate"	13 May 2019	60 minutes	717,000
Olivia and Digby worry about the state of their relationship following a dry spell in their sex life, whilst an overprotective Freddie grills James over his intentions with Rosi. Sammy is cautious when Maeva befriends her, and Eliza warns her that she may have an ulterior motive for wanting to form a friendship. Miles and James fail to make amends, Sammy worries that Maeva is getting too close for comfort, and James invites Eliza to Cape Town with the rest of the group. Elsewhere Jamie sees life from a different angle after a visit to a psychic, and Sophie sends Olivia and Digby to a sex therapist.
211	9	"Sometimes When You’re Drunk, The Truth Does Come Out"	20 May 2019	60 minutes	741,000
Eliza and James get flirty in South Africa, where Freddie is shocked to learn that James may not be into Rosi as much as she is with him. Jamie opens up to Verity about his past relationships and how he values friendship more, whilst back in Chelsea, Maeva gets back on the dating scene by going out for drinks with Hugo. Things turn awkward for Miles when he invites Sammy to Maeva’s event only to realise that his ex has also moved on with somebody else. Elsewhere Angus and Amelia set up a dating profile, Jamie realises he has feelings for Habbs, and Sammy loses her patience with Maeva and Miles following their mind games with each other.
212	10	"Maybe Suck On A Sweet While I Tell You This"	27 May 2019	60 minutes	789,000
James tells Rosi that they’re just friends before sharing a kiss with Eliza. Amelia bumps into Hugo at a speed dating event where the pair hit it off. Elsewhere Alex opens up about the loss of his mother, and Jamie finds out that Olivia has told Habbs about his feelings towards her. Eliza is far from impressed when Rosi takes a swipe at her, whilst James extends an olive branch towards Miles. Maeva feels betrayed to discover that Amelia and Hugo have shared a kiss, and Jamie puts his heart on the line as tells Habbs exactly how he feels only for her to tell him that they could never take things further.
213	11	"I’m Gonna Meghan Markle Myself"	3 June 2019	60 minutes	690,000
Habbs tells Olivia that she wishes Jamie hadn’t been quite so honest with her. Elsewhere Miles and Maeva begin to hang out more as friends, and Verity gets her wires crossed when she assumes Jamie has feelings for her. Hugo tells Amelia he doesn’t want to jump straight into a relationship with her, whilst Sophie wants to become British, and Melissa feels guilty as Verity is encouraged to make a move on Jamie. Maeva breaks down as she tells Miles she still loves him, but is left in turmoil when he tells her they don’t have a future together. Verity tricks Jamie into a date before finding out the truth about his feelings for Habbs.
214	12	"Some People Are Off Limits"	10 June 2019	60 minutes	729,000
Jamie feels he’s lost his friendship with Habbs, whilst she worries that they’ll never get back to how the once were. Maeva is forced to tell Miles that she’s shared a kiss with James, causing another huge rift between the bickering boys. Sophie is there to pick up the pieces as Miles breaks down, whilst Maeva reveals it wasn’t a one off. Elsewhere Olivia gives James some harsh home truths, Amelia spends the night with Hugo, and Sophie confronts a guilty Maeva. Habbs has a huge decision to make as Jamie gives her an ultimatum.
215	13	"As Far As The Wrongest Thing You’ve Ever Done, This Ain’t That Bad"	17 June 2019	60 minutes	721,000
Habbs faces the consequences of her actions with Jamie as Sophie launches an attack on her, elsewhere Verity discovers that the feelings aren’t mutual between Amelia and Hugo. James’s attempt to apologise to Miles doesn’t go to plan, before Maeva is forced to let somebody down gently. Jamie desperately seeks advice from Proudlock as Habbs is drained by the negativity received from the others, and James finds out that Maeva has gone back to Miles. Amelia confronts Hugo over his dishonesty, Maeva and Miles clash again, and Habbs and Jamie finally give into temptation.

== Ratings ==
Catch-up service totals were added to the official ratings.

Episode	Date	Total E4 viewers	Total E4 weekly rank
Episode 1	25 March 2019	750,000	9
Episode 2	1 April 2019	767,000	6
Episode 3	8 April 2019	676,000	8
Episode 4	15 April 2019	681,000	9
Episode 5	22 April 2019	583,000	9
Episode 6	29 April 2019	689,000	7
Episode 7	6 May 2019	671,000	8
Episode 8	13 May 2019	717,000	7
Episode 9	20 May 2019	741,000	8
Episode 10	27 May 2019	789,000	4
Episode 11	3 June 2019	690,000	6
Episode 12	10 June 2019	729,000	5
Episode 13	17 June 2019	721,000	6
Average		708,000	7
