= Made in Chelsea series 18 =

Made in Chelsea
- Series 18
- No. of episodes: 11

Release
- Original network: E4
- Original release: 2 September – 11 November 2019

Series chronology
- ← Previous; Series 17 Next → Buenos Aires

The eighteenth series of Made in Chelsea, a British structured-reality television programme began airing on 2 September 2019, and concluded on 11 November 2019 following eleven episodes. For the first time since 2013, a Summer spin-off did not air between the two main series. Instead, one will follow later in the year. New cast members for this series included Reza Amiri-Garroussi and Zara McDermott, who had previously appeared on Love Island. This series also featured the return of former cast members Sam Thompson, Emily Blackwell, Tristan Phipps and Tabitha Willett.

This series focused heavily on the beginning of James and Maeva's relationship despite obstacles in the shape of Miles and Verity, as well as Jamie attempting to make amends with former best friend Sam after breaking his trust. It also included Olivia receive some life changing opportunities, and Emily and Verity competing for Tristan.

== Cast ==
- Alex Mytton
- Amelia Mist
- Angus Findlay
- Digby Edgley
- Eliza Batten
- Emily Blackwell
- Freddie Browne
- Fredrik Ferrier
- Harry Baron
- Hugo Leefe
- James Taylor
- Jamie Laing
- Maeva D'Ascanio
- Mark-Francis Vandelli
- Melissa Tattam
- Miles Nazaire
- Oliver Proudlock
- Olivia Bentley
- Reza Amiri-Garroussi
- Rosi Mai Waldon
- Sam Thompson
- Sammy Allsop
- Sophie “Habbs” Habboo
- Sophie Hermann
- Tabitha Willett
- Tristan Phipps
- Verity Scarlett Bowditch
- Victoria Baker-Harber
- Zara McDermott

== Episodes ==
| No. overall | No. in season | Title | Original release date | Duration | UK viewers |
|---|---|---|---|---|---|
| 216 | 1 | "Victoria, I Will Never Die" | 2 September 2019 | 60 minutes | 658,000 |
James and Miles continue to compete for Maeva’s attention having both kissed her on the same night, whilst Rosi confides in Verity about a boy she’s been hooking up with. Elsewhere Jamie and Habbs’s new relationship is the talk of Chelsea, and Freddie invites Miles to be his translator during his date with a French girl. James confesses to Maeva that he has feelings for her, as Miles goes home with Freddie’s date. Eliza attempts to protect her friend by questioning Maeva’s motives, and Rosi drops a bombshell on Verity by revealing that she had been briefly seeing Jamie without realising he was already seeing Habbs.
| 217 | 2 | "Right, I’ve Got A Little Bit Of A Situation" | 9 September 2019 | 60 minutes | 681,000 |
As Jamie reveals he’s in a really good place with Habbs, Rosi puts a spanner in the works when she addresses her situation with him. James revels in Miles’ misery when he tells him that he’s now exclusive with Maeva, and Amelia and Angus visit a flirting expert. Jamie is forced to tell a distressed Habbs about the nights he’s spent with Rosi, causing shockwaves around the group – and Melissa and Olivia are there to pick up the pieces. Elsewhere James tells Miles to let go of Maeva, and Maeva is on the warpath after hearing that Eliza has been speaking negatively about her again.
| 218 | 3 | "This Is Something That Chelsea Lacks – Common Decency!" | 16 September 2019 | 60 minutes | 686,000 |
Jamie desperately tries to reach out to Habbs, but she’s already taken some time away to reflect on her decision to cut him out of her life. Freddie is quick to point the finger at Rosi, whilst Olivia starts to see how sorry Jamie is. Maeva and Eliza go head-to-head before both agreeing to keep things civil for James’ sake, Victoria creates a new scent for her shop, and Olivia urges Habbs to hear Jamie out. Melissa is shocked by Olivia’s actions when she discovers that Habbs and Jamie are making progress, meanwhile Miles offers Eliza some advice on how to handle her feud with Maeva.
| 219 | 4 | "I’m The Opposite Of A Narcissist" | 23 September 2019 | 60 minutes | 770,000 |
Sam returns to Chelsea with a score to settle and is quick to learn about Jamie’s infidelity. James is racked with guilt after kissing a girl on a night out but soon pins the blame on Eliza for encouraging it. Elsewhere Sam wastes no time in telling Habbs exactly what he thinks of Jamie, and James has a crushing confession for Maeva. Habbs tells Jamie that she’s ready to commit to giving him another chance, Maeva and Eliza’s feud escalates, and Jamie attempts to reach out to his former best friend Sam. Meanwhile Miles seeks some much needed advice from his Mother, whilst Sam refuses to accept Jamie’s half-hearted apology.
| 220 | 5 | "Who Brought Maeva?" | 30 September 2019 | 60 minutes | 723,000 |
Olivia is overwhelmed by the offer of a new opportunity, and she grabs it with both hands. James considers asking Maeva to be his girlfriend unaware that she’s hell-bent on getting revenge on him following his recent mistake. Habbs encourages Jamie to clear the air with Sam, whilst Maeva has a heart-to-heart with Miles where she admits that she’s still in love with him. Sophie takes Amelia under her wing and teaches her how to love herself, Jamie sends Sam a birthday card, and James has a burning question for Maeva. Following a meeting with a magazine, Olivia is delighted to begin a new chapter in her life, and Maeva hears another rumour about James.
| 221 | 6 | "I Don’t Know How Many More Nails We Can Put In The Coffin" | 7 October 2019 | 60 minutes | 755,000 |
James seeks answers when Miles tells him about Maeva’s confession of love to him, whilst Rosi takes matters into her own hands by telling Miles to back off. Elsewhere Olivia inspires at her magazine photoshoot, Jamie and Sam’s girlfriend Zara meet for the first time, and Maeva isn’t impressed by Rosi’s interference. Jamie contemplates his next move in a mission to become Sam’s friend again, and Miles realises enough is enough and cuts Maeva out of his life completely. Rosi announces a trip to Istanbul with select invites, but there’s tension brewing between Verity and Maeva.
| 222 | 7 | "He Must Be Great In The Sack" | 14 October 2019 | 60 minutes | 750,000 |
Rosi realises that inviting Verity to Istanbul may have been a mistake when she notices a connection between her and James, and Harry warns Sam against rekindling his friendship with Jamie. Back in Chelsea, Alex organises a coffee morning for a charity close to his heart, and Sophie expresses herself through painting. Maeva is left reeling when Rosi shares information about a night Verity and James spent the night together, whilst Zara feels that her conversation with Jamie was a bit too intense. James attempts to spin the situation on Verity when Maeva erupts, and Habbs meets Jamie’s parents.
| 223 | 8 | "He Needs To Go To Better Lad School" | 21 October 2019 | 60 minutes | 849,000 |
Maeva returns from Istanbul with James having forgiven him, whereas Verity is desperate to get her side of the story across. Habbs feels that Sam’s decision has been influenced by others, Miles begins to see Emily in a new light after a noticing a spark between them, and Jamie clashes with Harry. Tristan’s back and is quick to catch the eye of Verity, meanwhile Habbs realises that Melissa has a problem with Jamie, and Maeva is on the warpath again. Tristan feels he can fix the rift between former friends Miles and James, Jamie goes to Alex for support, and Habbs wants to know exactly what Melissa and Harry think of her relationship.
| 224 | 9 | "Let’s Break Some Bread" | 28 October 2019 | 60 minutes | 821,000 |
Sam begins to feel some sympathy for Jamie and vows to put some effort into rebuilding their friendship. Tristan asks Emily out on a date before kissing Verity at the end of the night. Maeva isn’t impressed when Melissa turns down her invite for a double date, Habbs sees the perfect opportunity to get Sam and Jamie talking again, and Emily finds out about Tristan’s kiss with Verity. Mark Francis has a catch-up with Victoria, meanwhile Emily and Verity take swipe at each other when the pair come face-to-face. Tristan has some explaining to do to both girls, whilst James and Maeva feel out of the loop.
| 225 | 10 | "If Anyone Could Ride A Lion It’s Tristan" | 4 November 2019 | 60 minutes | 815,000 |
Harry tells Sam that he disapproves of his decision to allow Jamie back into his life, whilst Olivia prepares to say goodbye to Digby for three months. Verity arranges her date with Tristan unaware that he’s also agreed to go on a second date with Emily. Jamie and Sam continue to hang out with each other, but Sam admits that he still feels awkward during group situations with Habbs. Verity takes great pleasure in telling Emily that Tristan has picked her, whilst Tristan realises he needs to stop playing both girls off against each other. Elsewhere Tabitha asks Olivia to be Godmother to her daughter, and Mark Francis tries to be sustainable.
| 226 | 11 | "The Dudelsack Is Out!" | 11 November 2019 | 60 minutes | 803,000 |
Olivia struggles with saying goodbye to Digby, whilst James struggles to keep it together when he meets Maeva’s overprotective father for the first time. Emily is shocked to hear that Tristan and Verity have slept together, but ultimately gives them her blessing. Maeva rages when she interrupts Miles and her father out for a drink, and Tristan is overwhelmed when Verity forces him into an agreement. Sophie shocks Fred by revealing her secret to staying in shape. Elsewhere Tristan tells Verity he’s excited to see what the future holds, Sam and Jamie celebrate friendship, and Maeva cuts all ties with Miles.

== Ratings ==
Catch-up service totals were added to the official ratings.

| Episode | Date | Total E4 viewers | Total E4 weekly rank |
|---|---|---|---|
| Episode 1 | 2 September 2019 | 658,000 | 6 |
| Episode 2 | 9 September 2019 | 681,000 | 6 |
| Episode 3 | 16 September 2019 | 686,000 | 6 |
| Episode 4 | 23 September 2019 | 770,000 | 6 |
| Episode 5 | 30 September 2019 | 723,000 | 6 |
| Episode 6 | 7 October 2019 | 755,000 | 7 |
| Episode 7 | 14 October 2019 | 750,000 | 7 |
| Episode 8 | 21 October 2019 | 849,000 | 7 |
| Episode 9 | 28 October 2019 | 821,000 | 7 |
| Episode 10 | 4 November 2019 | 815,000 | 7 |
| Episode 11 | 11 November 2019 | 803,000 | 7 |
| Average | | 756,000 | 7 |
