= Forbes list of the World's 100 Most Powerful Women =

Ranking published by Forbes magazine

Logo of Forbes magazine

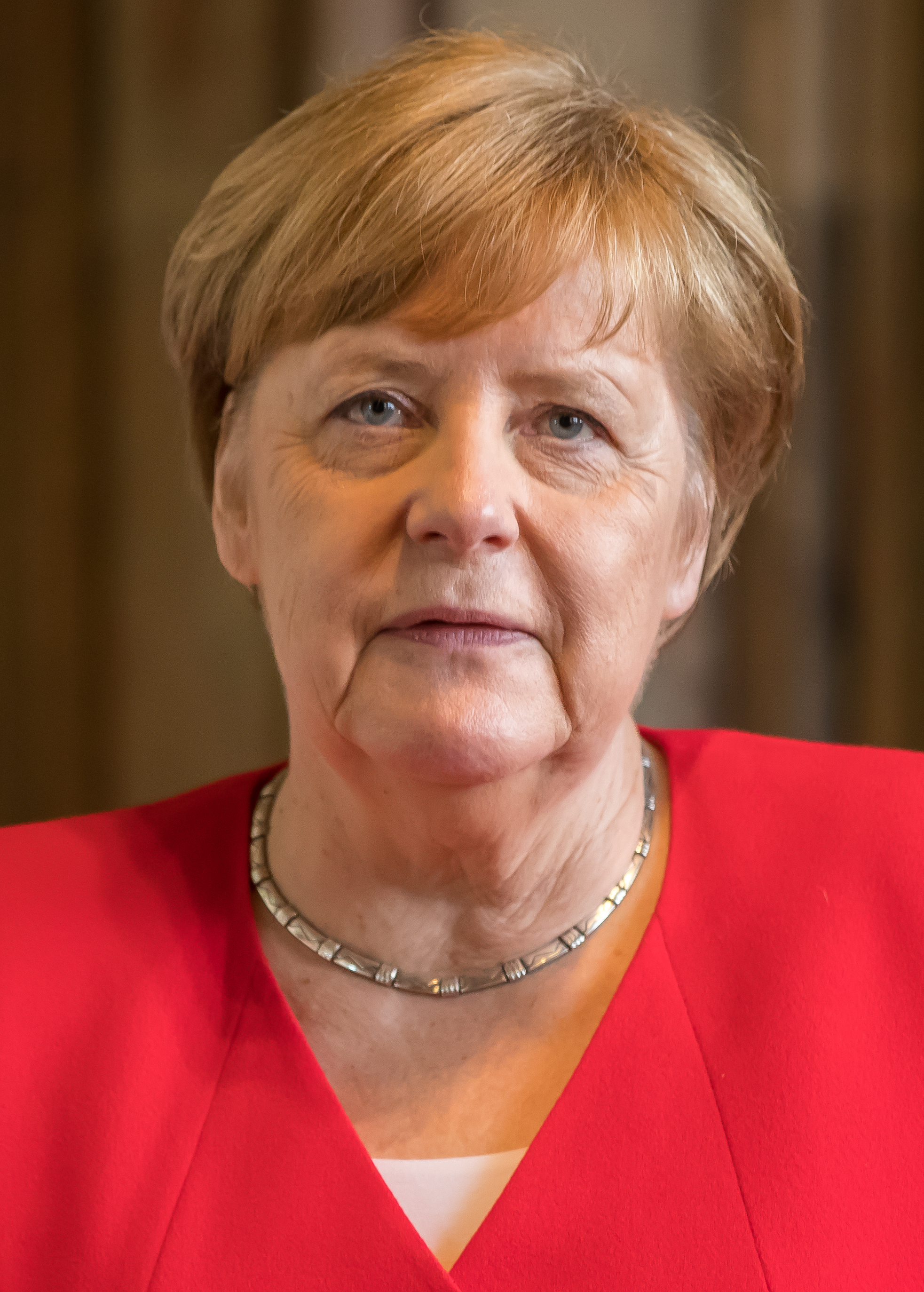
Angela Merkel has been ranked the most powerful woman 14 times.

Since 2004, Forbes, an American business magazine, has published an annual list of its ranking of the 100 most powerful women in the world. Edited by prominent Forbes journalists, including Moira Forbes, the list is compiled using various criteria such as visibility and economic impact. In 2025, the gauge was "where do women hold real power". The top 10 per year are listed below.

== 2025 ==
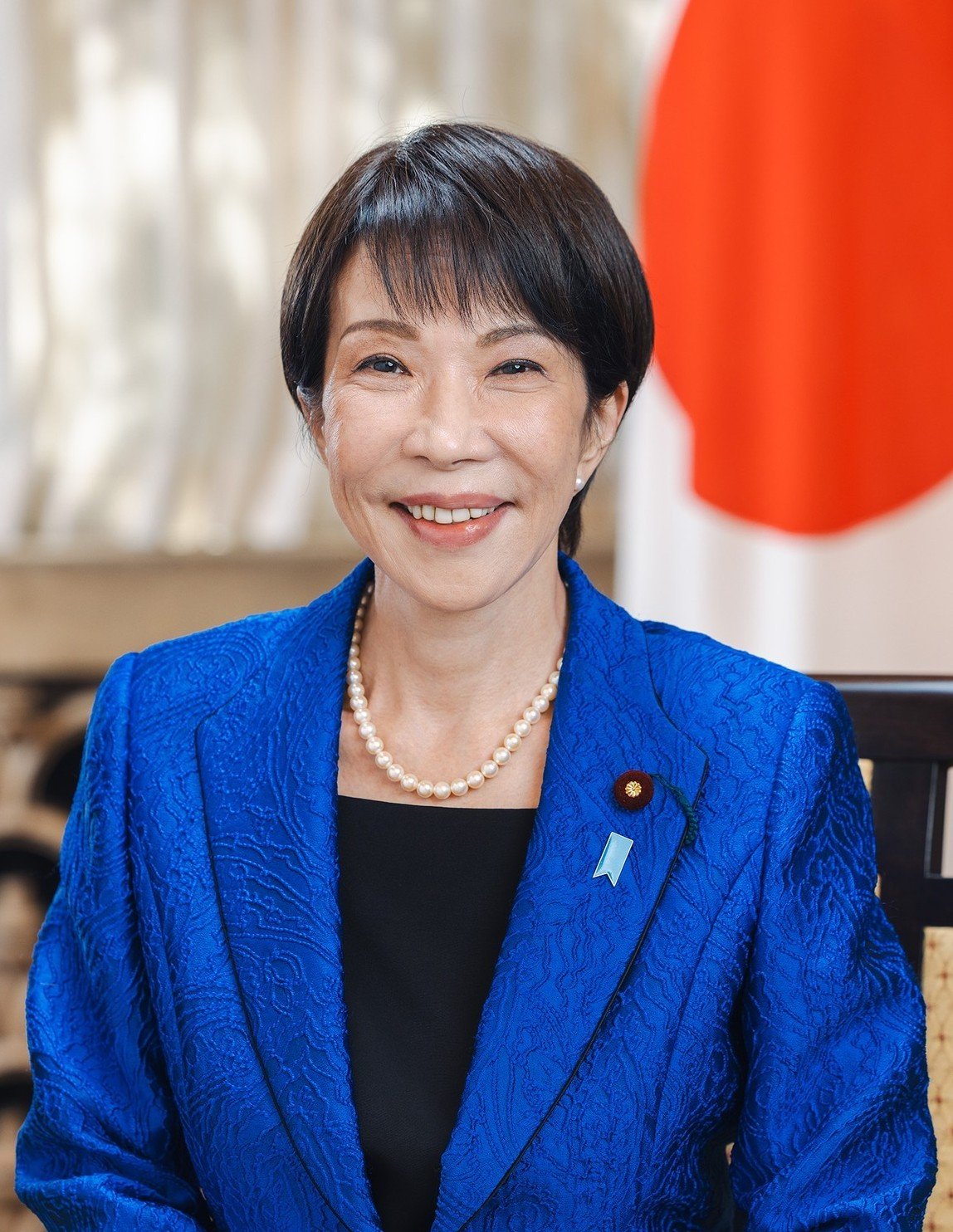
Sanae Takaichi

1. (Germany) (European Union) Ursula von der Leyen, President of the European Commission
2. (France) (European Union) Christine Lagarde, President of the European Central Bank
3. Sanae Takaichi, Prime Minister of Japan
4. (European Union) Giorgia Meloni, Prime Minister of Italy
5. Claudia Sheinbaum, President of Mexico
6. (United States) Julie Sweet, CEO of Accenture
7. (United States) Mary Barra, CEO of General Motors
8. (United Kingdom) (United States) Jane Fraser, CEO of Citigroup
9. (United States) Abigail Johnson, CEO of Fidelity Investments
10. (United States) Lisa Su, CEO of AMD

== 2024 ==
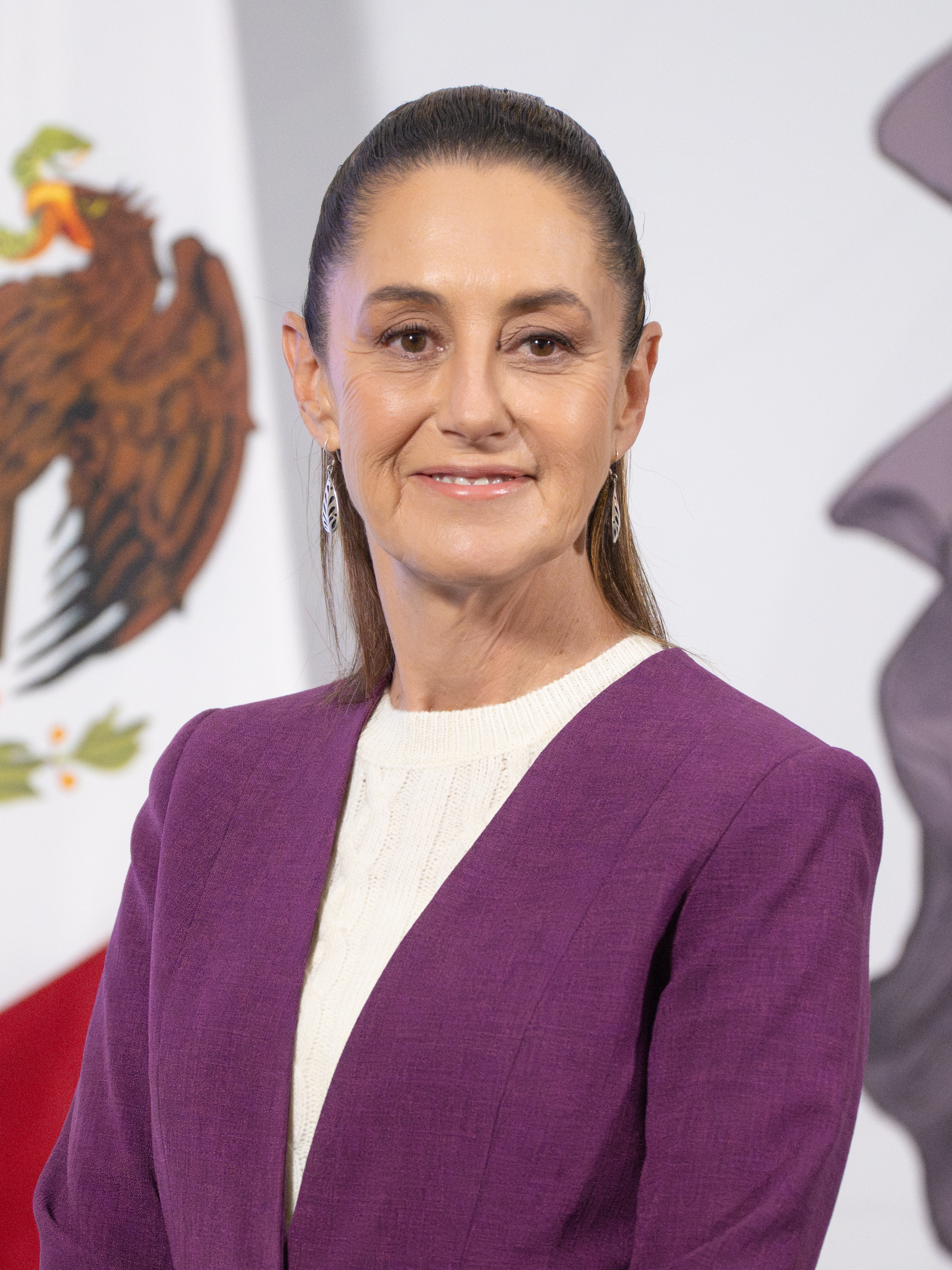
Claudia Sheinbaum

1. (Germany) (European Union) Ursula von der Leyen, President of the European Commission
2. (France) (European Union) Christine Lagarde, President of the European Central Bank
3. (European Union) Giorgia Meloni, Prime Minister of Italy
4. Claudia Sheinbaum, President of Mexico
5. (United States) Mary Barra, CEO of General Motors
6. (United States) Abigail Johnson, CEO of Fidelity Investments
7. (United States) Julie Sweet, CEO of Accenture
8. (United States) Melinda French Gates, co-chair of the Gates Foundation
9. (United States) MacKenzie Scott, philanthropist
10. (United Kingdom) (United States) Jane Fraser, CEO of Citigroup

== 2023 ==
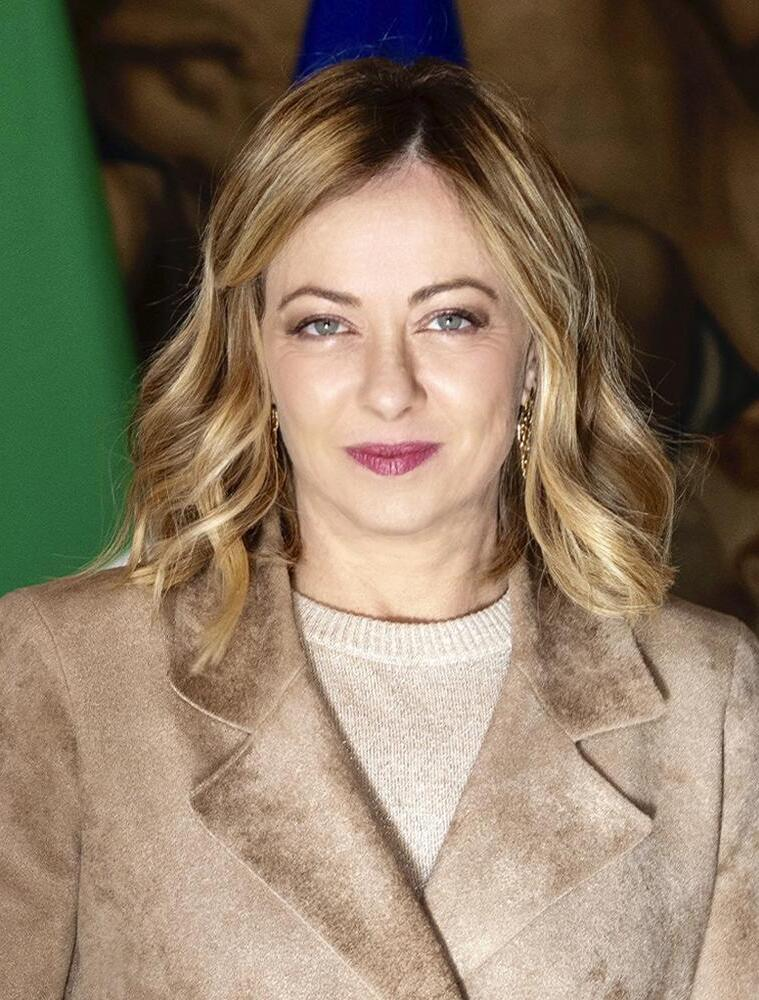
Giorgia Meloni

1. (Germany) (European Union) Ursula von der Leyen, President of the European Commission
2. (France) (European Union) Christine Lagarde, President of the European Central Bank
3. Kamala Harris, Vice President of the United States
4. (European Union) Giorgia Meloni, Prime Minister of Italy
5. (United States) Taylor Swift, singer-songwriter
6. (United States) Karen Lynch, CEO of CVS Health
7. (United Kingdom) (United States) Jane Fraser, CEO of Citigroup
8. (United States) Abigail Johnson, President-CEO of Fidelity Investments
9. (United States) Mary Barra, CEO of General Motors
10. (United States) Melinda French Gates, co-chair of the Gates Foundation

== 2022 ==
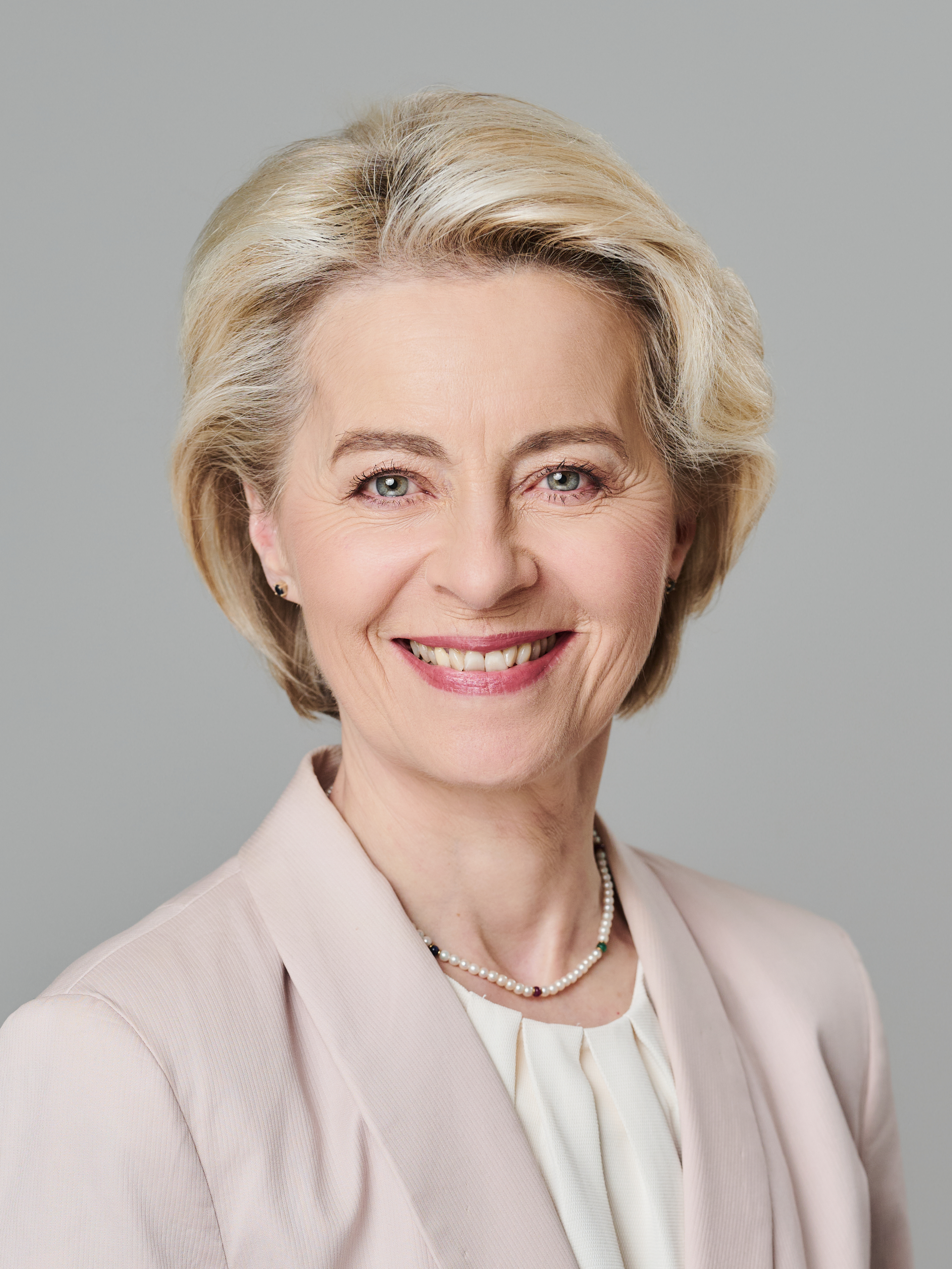
Ursula von der Leyen

1. (Germany) (European Union) Ursula von der Leyen, President of the European Commission
2. (France) (European Union) Christine Lagarde, President of the European Central Bank
3. Kamala Harris, Vice President of the United States
4. (United States) Mary Barra, CEO of General Motors
5. (United States) Abigail Johnson, President-CEO of Fidelity Investments
6. (United States) Melinda French Gates, Co-Chair of the Gates Foundation
7. (European Union) Giorgia Meloni, Prime Minister of Italy
8. (United States) Karen Lynch, CEO of CVS Health
9. (United States) Julie Sweet, CEO of Accenture
10. (United States) Jane Fraser, CEO of Citigroup

== 2021 ==
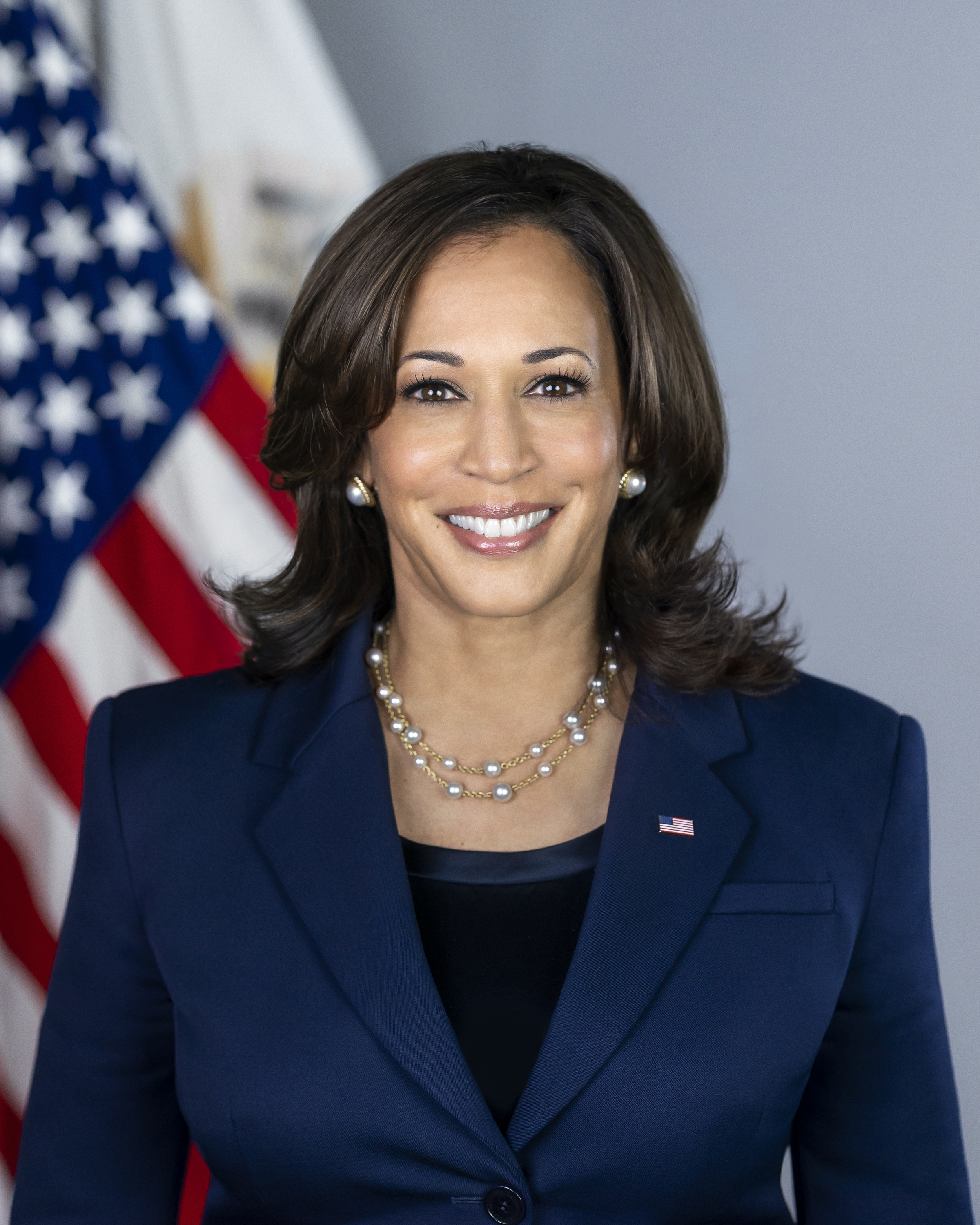
Kamala Harris

1. (United States) MacKenzie Scott, philanthropist
2. Kamala Harris, Vice President of the United States
3. (France) (European Union) Christine Lagarde, President of the European Central Bank
4. (United States) Mary Barra, CEO of General Motors
5. (United States) Melinda French Gates, Co-Chair of the Gates Foundation
6. (United States) Abigail Johnson, President-CEO of Fidelity Investments
7. (Spain) (European Union) Ana Patricia Botín, Executive Chairman of Banco Santander
8. (Germany) (European Union) Ursula von der Leyen, President of the European Commission
9. Tsai Ing-wen, President of Taiwan
10. (United States) Julie Sweet, CEO of Accenture

== 2020 ==
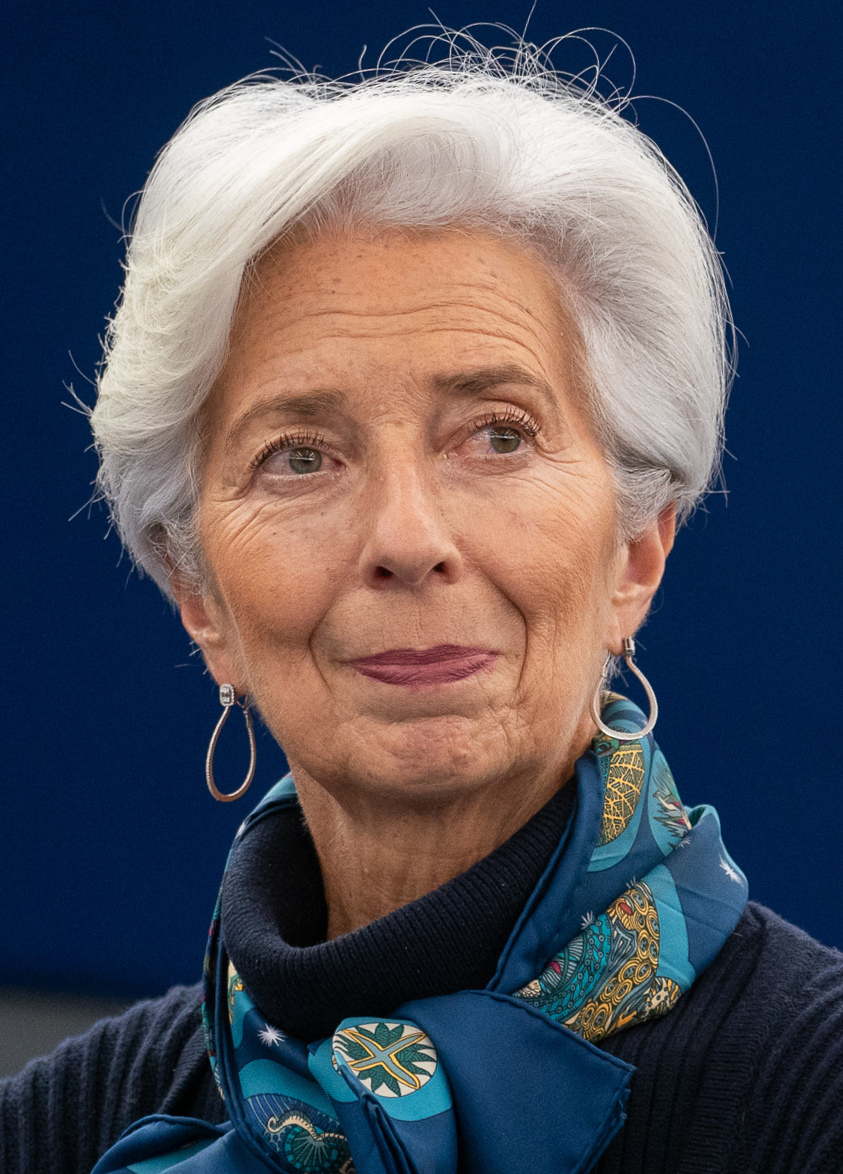
Christine Lagarde

1. (European Union) Angela Merkel, Chancellor of Germany
2. (France) (European Union) Christine Lagarde, President of the European Central Bank
3. Kamala Harris, Vice President-elect of the United States
4. (Germany) (European Union) Ursula von der Leyen, President of the European Commission
5. (United States) Melinda French Gates, Co-Chair of the Gates Foundation
6. (United States) Mary Barra, CEO of General Motors
7. Nancy Pelosi, Speaker of the United States House of Representatives
8. (Spain) (European Union) Ana Patricia Botín, Executive Chairman of Banco Santander
9. (United States) Abigail Johnson, President-CEO of Fidelity Investments
10. (United States) Gail Koziara Boudreaux, CEO of Anthem

== 2019 ==
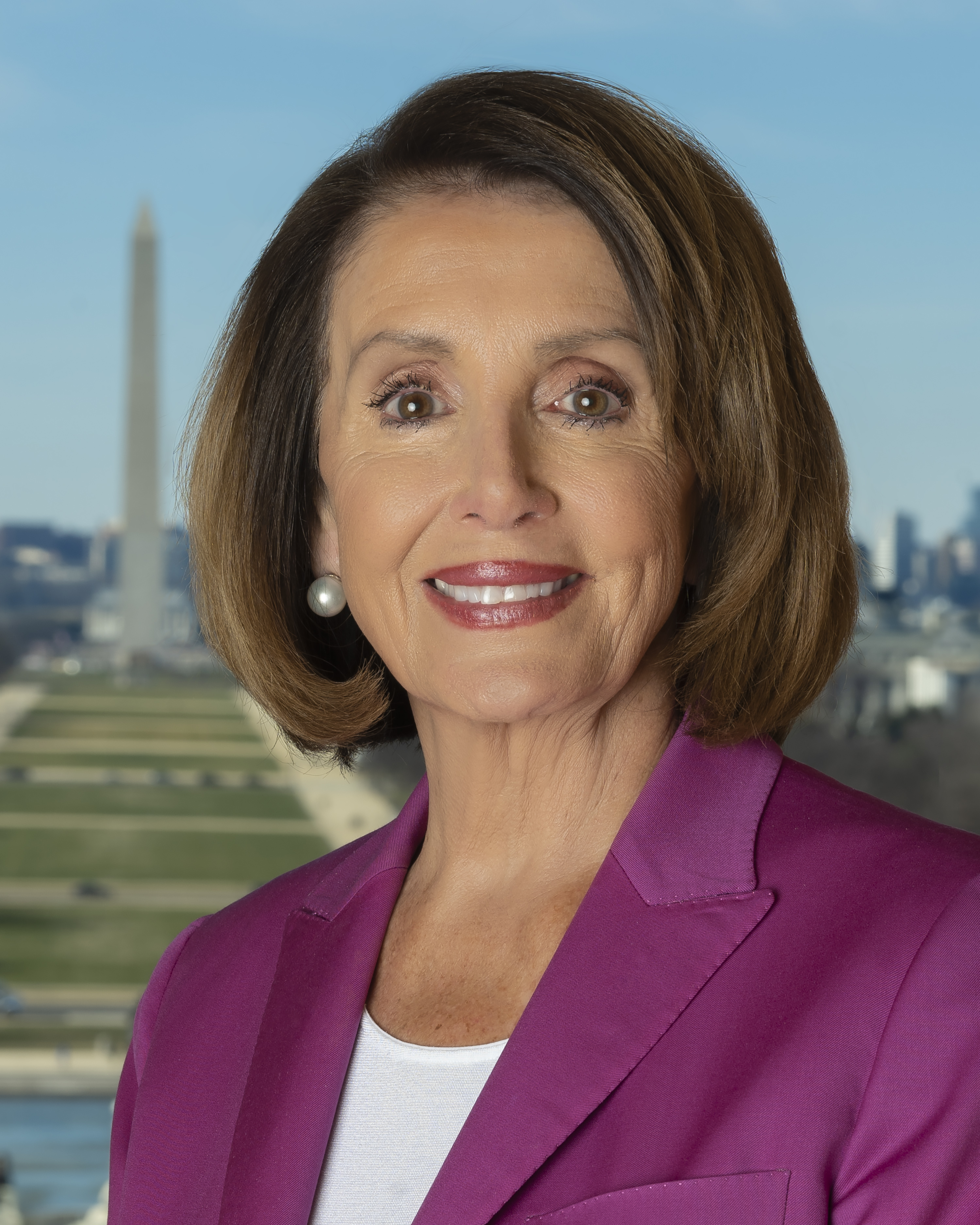
Nancy Pelosi

1. (European Union) Angela Merkel, Chancellor of Germany
2. (France) (European Union) Christine Lagarde, President of the European Central Bank
3. Nancy Pelosi, Speaker of the United States House of Representatives
4. (Germany) (European Union) Ursula von der Leyen, President of the European Commission
5. (United States) Mary Barra, CEO of General Motors
6. (United States) Melinda French Gates, Co-Chair of the Gates Foundation
7. (United States) Abigail Johnson, President-CEO of Fidelity Investments
8. (Spain) (European Union) Ana Patricia Botín, Executive Chairman of Banco Santander
9. (United States) Ginni Rometty, CEO of IBM
10. (United States) Marillyn Hewson, CEO of Lockheed Martin

== 2018 ==
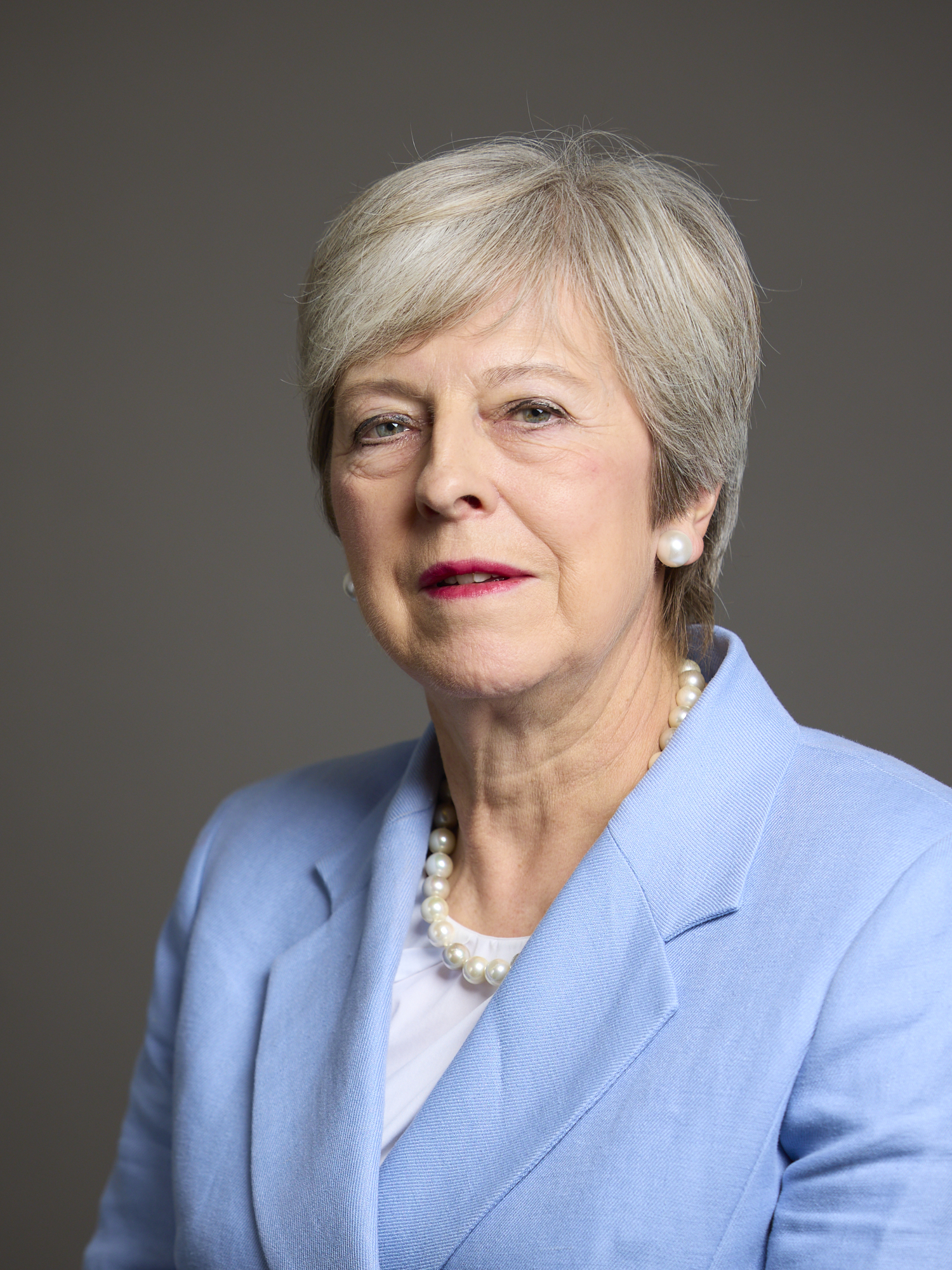
Theresa May

1. (European Union) Angela Merkel, Chancellor of Germany
2. (European Union) Theresa May, Prime Minister of the United Kingdom
3. (France) (European Union) Christine Lagarde, Managing Director of the International Monetary Fund
4. (United States) Mary Barra, CEO of General Motors
5. (United States) Abigail Johnson, President-CEO of Fidelity Investments
6. (United States) Melinda French Gates, Co-Chair of the Gates Foundation
7. (United States) Susan Wojcicki, CEO of YouTube
8. (Spain) (European Union) Ana Patricia Botín, Executive Chairman of Banco Santander
9. (United States) Marillyn Hewson, CEO of Lockheed Martin
10. (United States) Ginni Rometty, CEO of IBM

== 2017 ==
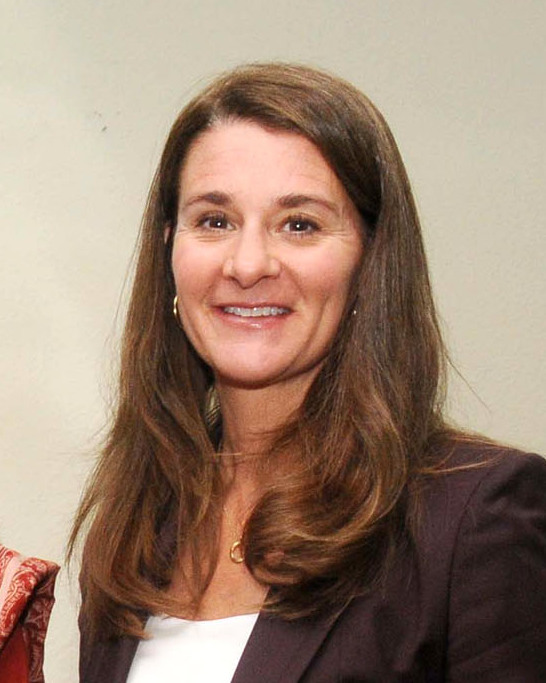
Melinda Gates

1. (European Union) Angela Merkel, Chancellor of Germany
2. (European Union) Theresa May, Prime Minister of the United Kingdom
3. (United States) Melinda French Gates, Co-Chair of the Gates Foundation
4. (United States) Sheryl Sandberg, COO of Facebook
5. (United States) Mary Barra, CEO of General Motors
6. (United States) Susan Wojcicki, CEO of YouTube
7. (United States) Abigail Johnson, President-CEO of Fidelity Investments
8. (France) (European Union) Christine Lagarde, Managing Director of the International Monetary Fund
9. (Spain) (European Union) Ana Patricia Botín, Executive Chairman of Banco Santander
10. (United States) Ginni Rometty, CEO of IBM

== 2016 ==
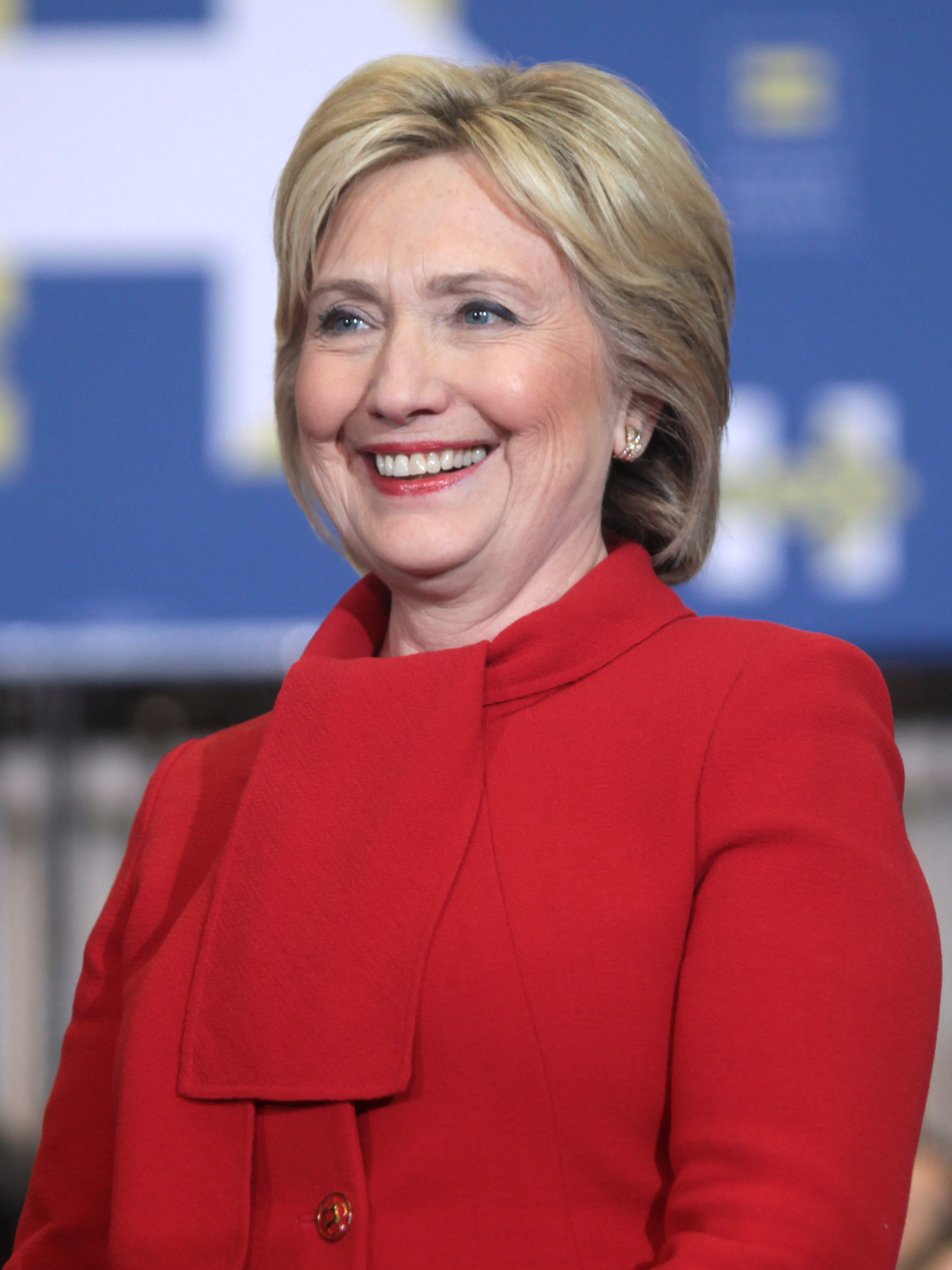
Hillary Clinton

1. (European Union) Angela Merkel, Chancellor of Germany
2. Hillary Clinton, United States presidential candidate
3. (United States) Janet Yellen, Chair of the U.S. Federal Reserve
4. (United States) Melinda French Gates, Co-Chair of the Gates Foundation
5. (United States) Mary Barra, CEO of General Motors
6. (France) (European Union) Christine Lagarde, Managing Director of the International Monetary Fund
7. (United States) Sheryl Sandberg, COO of Facebook
8. (United States) Susan Wojcicki, CEO of YouTube
9. (United States) Meg Whitman, CEO of Hewlett Packard Enterprise
10. (Spain) (European Union) Ana Patricia Botín, Executive Chairman of Banco Santander

== 2015 ==
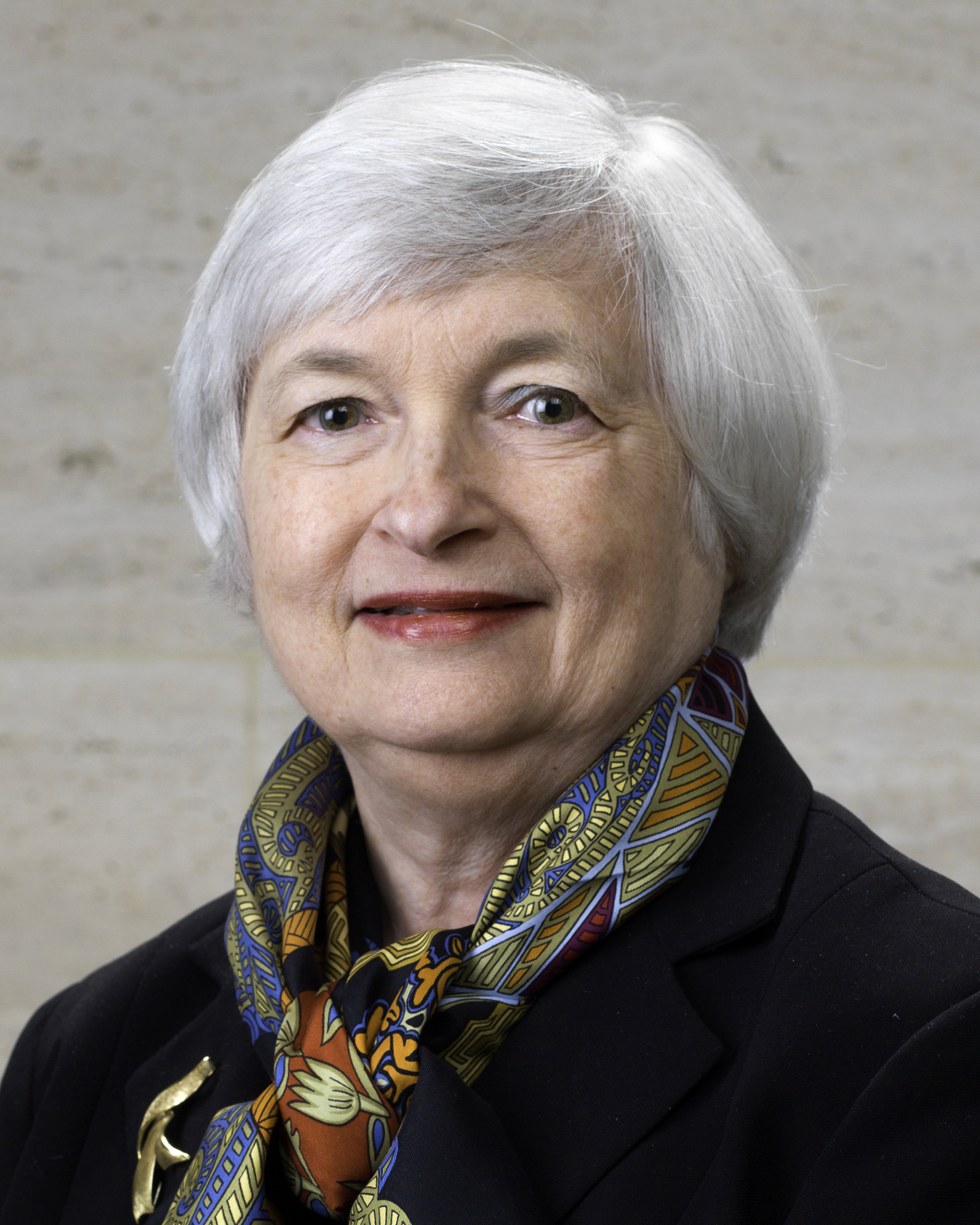
Janet Yellen

1. (European Union) Angela Merkel, Chancellor of Germany
2. Hillary Clinton, United States presidential candidate
3. (United States) Melinda French Gates, Co-Chair of the Gates Foundation
4. (United States) Janet Yellen, Chair of the U.S. Federal Reserve
5. (United States) Mary Barra, CEO of General Motors
6. (France) (European Union) Christine Lagarde, Managing Director of the International Monetary Fund
7. Dilma Rousseff, President of Brazil
8. (United States) Sheryl Sandberg, COO of Facebook
9. (United States) Susan Wojcicki, CEO of YouTube
10. Michelle Obama, First Lady of the United States

== 2014 ==
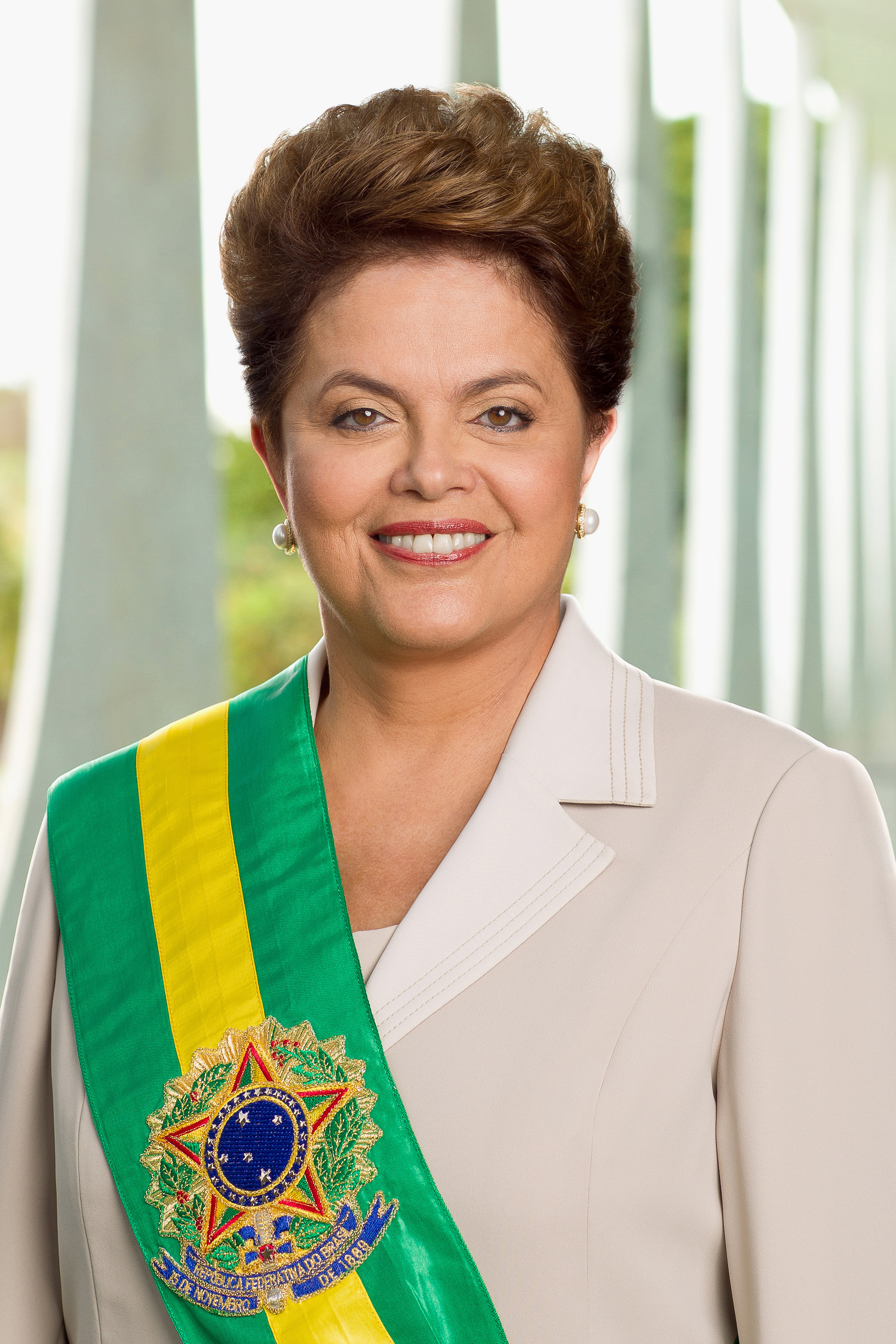
Dilma Rousseff

1. (European Union) Angela Merkel, Chancellor of Germany
2. (United States) Janet Yellen, Chair of the U.S. Federal Reserve
3. (United States) Melinda French Gates, Co-Chair of the Gates Foundation
4. Dilma Rousseff, President of Brazil
5. (France) (European Union) Christine Lagarde, Managing Director of the International Monetary Fund
6. Hillary Clinton, former United States Secretary of State
7. (United States) Mary Barra, CEO of General Motors
8. Michelle Obama, First Lady of the United States
9. (United States) Sheryl Sandberg, COO of Facebook
10. (United States) Ginni Rometty, CEO of IBM

== 2013 ==
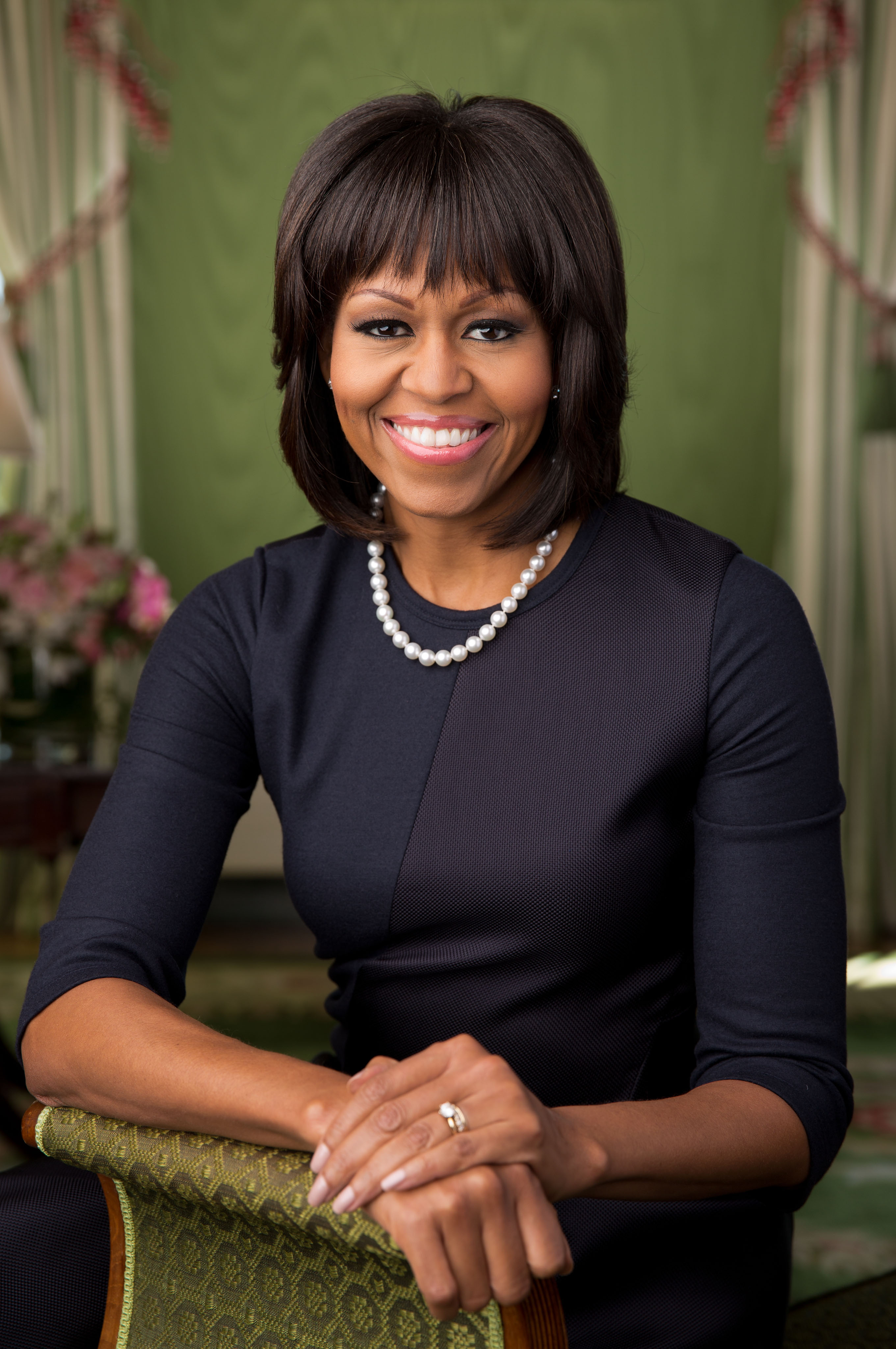
Michelle Obama

1. (European Union) Angela Merkel, Chancellor of Germany
2. Dilma Rousseff, President of Brazil
3. (United States) Melinda French Gates, Co-Chair of the Gates Foundation
4. Michelle Obama, First Lady of the United States
5. Hillary Clinton, United States Secretary of State
6. (United States) Sheryl Sandberg, COO of Facebook
7. (France) (European Union) Christine Lagarde, Managing Director of the International Monetary Fund
8. Janet Napolitano, United States Secretary of Homeland Security
9. (India) Sonia Gandhi, President of the Indian National Congress
10. (United States) Indra Nooyi, Chairman and CEO of PepsiCo

== 2012 ==
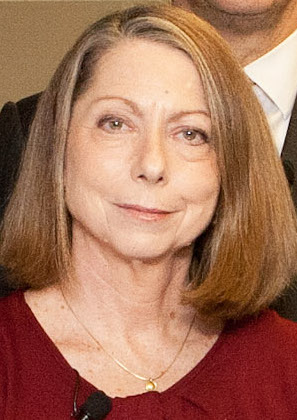
Jill Abramson

1. (European Union) Angela Merkel, Chancellor of Germany
2. Hillary Clinton, United States Secretary of State
3. Dilma Rousseff, President of Brazil
4. (United States) Melinda French Gates, Co-Chair of the Gates Foundation
5. (United States) Jill Abramson, Executive Editor of The New York Times
6. (India) Sonia Gandhi, President of the Indian National Congress
7. Michelle Obama, First Lady of the United States
8. (France) (European Union) Christine Lagarde, Managing Director of the International Monetary Fund
9. Janet Napolitano, United States Secretary of Homeland Security
10. (United States) Sheryl Sandberg, COO of Facebook

== 2011 ==
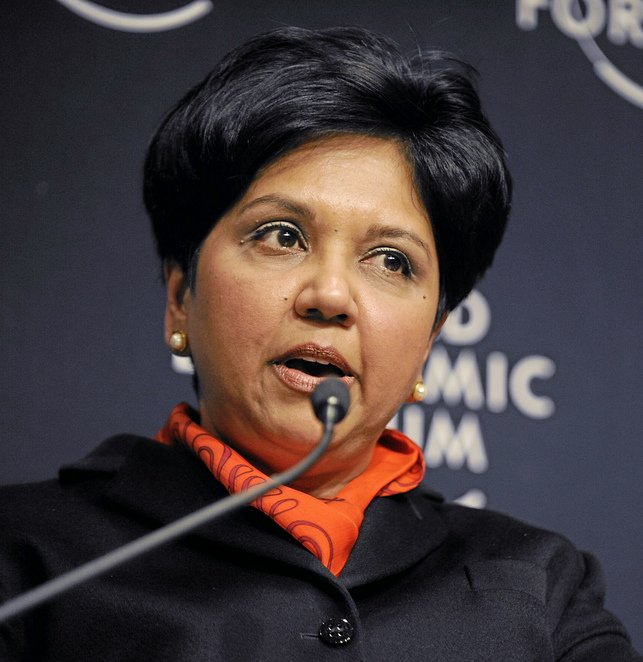
Indra Nooyi

1. (European Union) Angela Merkel, Chancellor of Germany
2. Hillary Clinton, United States Secretary of State
3. Dilma Rousseff, President of Brazil
4. (United States) Indra Nooyi, Chairman and CEO of PepsiCo
5. (United States) Sheryl Sandberg, COO of Facebook
6. (United States) Melinda French Gates, Co-Chair of the Gates Foundation
7. (India) Sonia Gandhi, President of the Indian National Congress
8. Michelle Obama, First Lady of the United States
9. (France) (European Union) Christine Lagarde, Managing Director of the International Monetary Fund
10. (United States) Irene Rosenfeld, Chairman and CEO of Mondelez International

== 2010 ==
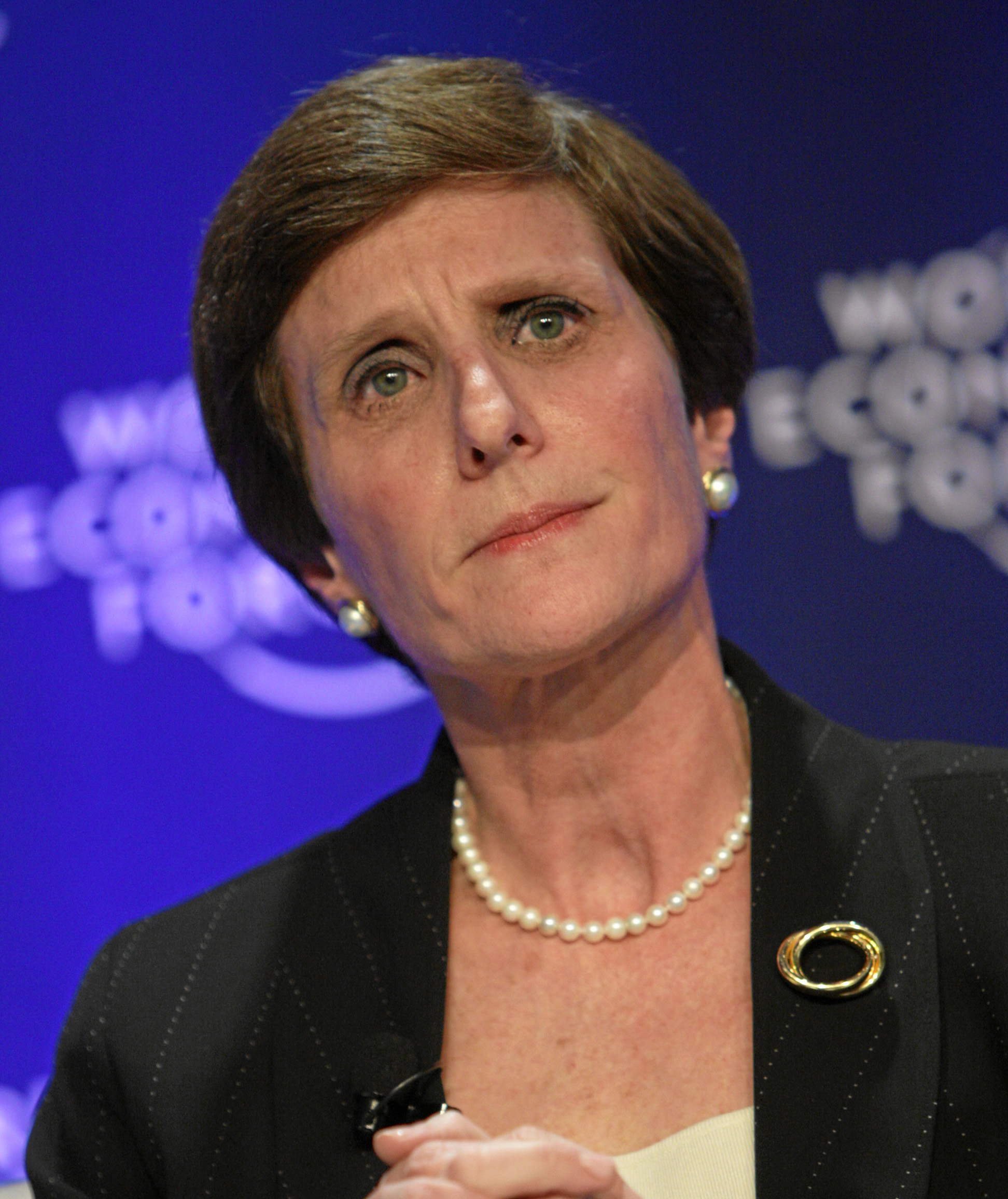
Irene Rosenfeld

1. Michelle Obama, First Lady of the United States
2. (United States) Irene Rosenfeld, Chairman and CEO of Mondelez International
3. (United States) Oprah Winfrey, talk show host on The Oprah Winfrey Show
4. (European Union) Angela Merkel, Chancellor of Germany
5. Hillary Clinton, United States Secretary of State
6. (United States) Indra Nooyi, Chairman and CEO of PepsiCo
7. (United States) Lady Gaga, singer-songwriter
8. (Australia) Gail Kelly, CEO of Westpac
9. (United States) Beyoncé, singer-songwriter
10. (United States) Ellen DeGeneres, talk show host on The Ellen DeGeneres Show

== 2009 ==
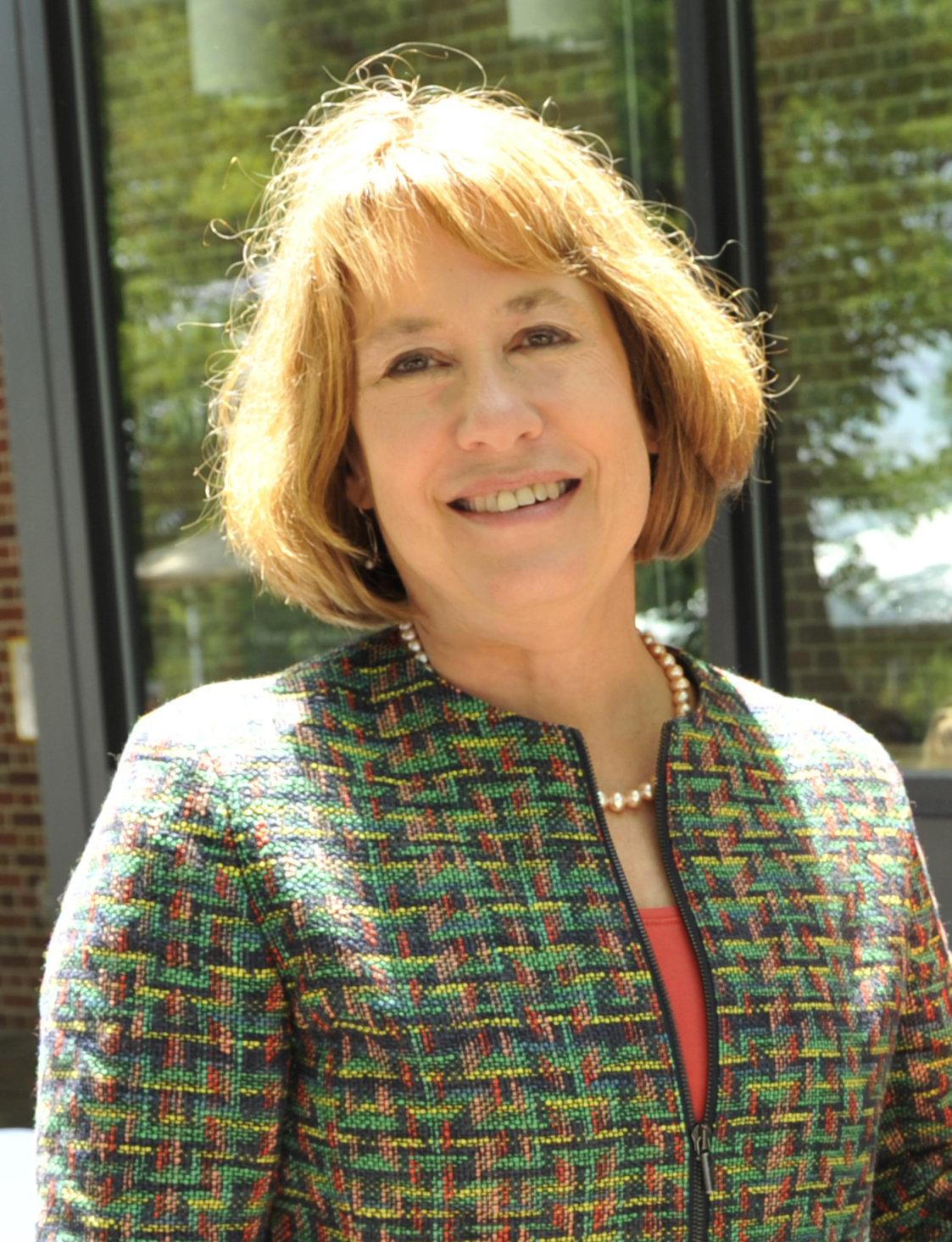
Sheila Bair

1. (European Union) Angela Merkel, Chancellor of Germany
2. (United States) Sheila Bair, Chair of the U.S. Federal Deposit Insurance Corporation
3. (United States) Indra Nooyi, Chairman and CEO of PepsiCo
4. (United States) Cynthia Carroll, CEO of Anglo American plc
5. (Singapore) Ho Ching, CEO of Temasek Holdings
6. (United States) Irene Rosenfeld, Chairman and CEO of Mondelez International
7. (United States) Ellen Kullman, CEO of DuPont
8. (United States) Angela Braly, President-CEO of Anthem
9. (France) (European Union) Anne Lauvergeon, CEO of Areva
10. (United States) Lynn Elsenhans, Chairwoman, CEO and President of Sunoco

== 2008 ==
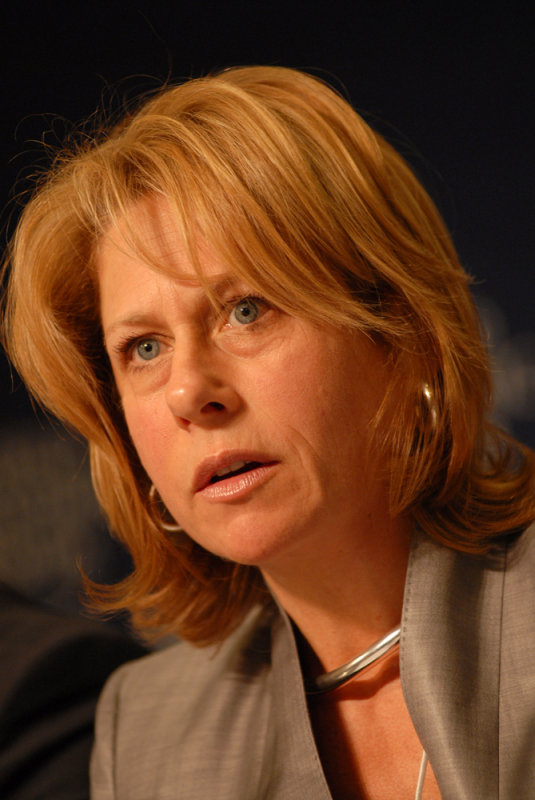
Cynthia Carroll

1. (European Union) Angela Merkel, Chancellor of Germany
2. (United States) Sheila Bair, Chair of the U.S. Federal Deposit Insurance Corporation
3. (United States) Indra Nooyi, Chairman and CEO of PepsiCo
4. (United States) Angela Braly, President-CEO of Anthem
5. (United States) Cynthia Carroll, CEO of Anglo American plc
6. (United States) Irene Rosenfeld, Chairman and CEO of Mondelez International
7. Condoleezza Rice, United States Secretary of State
8. (Singapore) Ho Ching, CEO of Temasek Holdings
9. (France) (European Union) Anne Lauvergeon, CEO of Areva
10. (United States) Anne Mulcahy, Chairman and CEO of Xerox

== 2007 ==
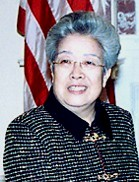
Wu Yi

1. (European Union) Angela Merkel, Chancellor of Germany
2. Wu Yi, Vice Premier of the People's Republic of China
3. (Singapore) Ho Ching, CEO of Temasek Holdings
4. Condoleezza Rice, United States Secretary of State
5. (United States) Indra Nooyi, Chairman and CEO of PepsiCo
6. (India) Sonia Gandhi, President of the Indian National Congress
7. (United States) Cynthia Carroll, CEO of Anglo American plc
8. (United States) Patricia Woertz, President-CEO of ADM
9. (United States) Irene Rosenfeld, Chairman and CEO of Mondelez International
10. (United States) Patricia Russo, CEO of Alcatel-Lucent

== 2006 ==
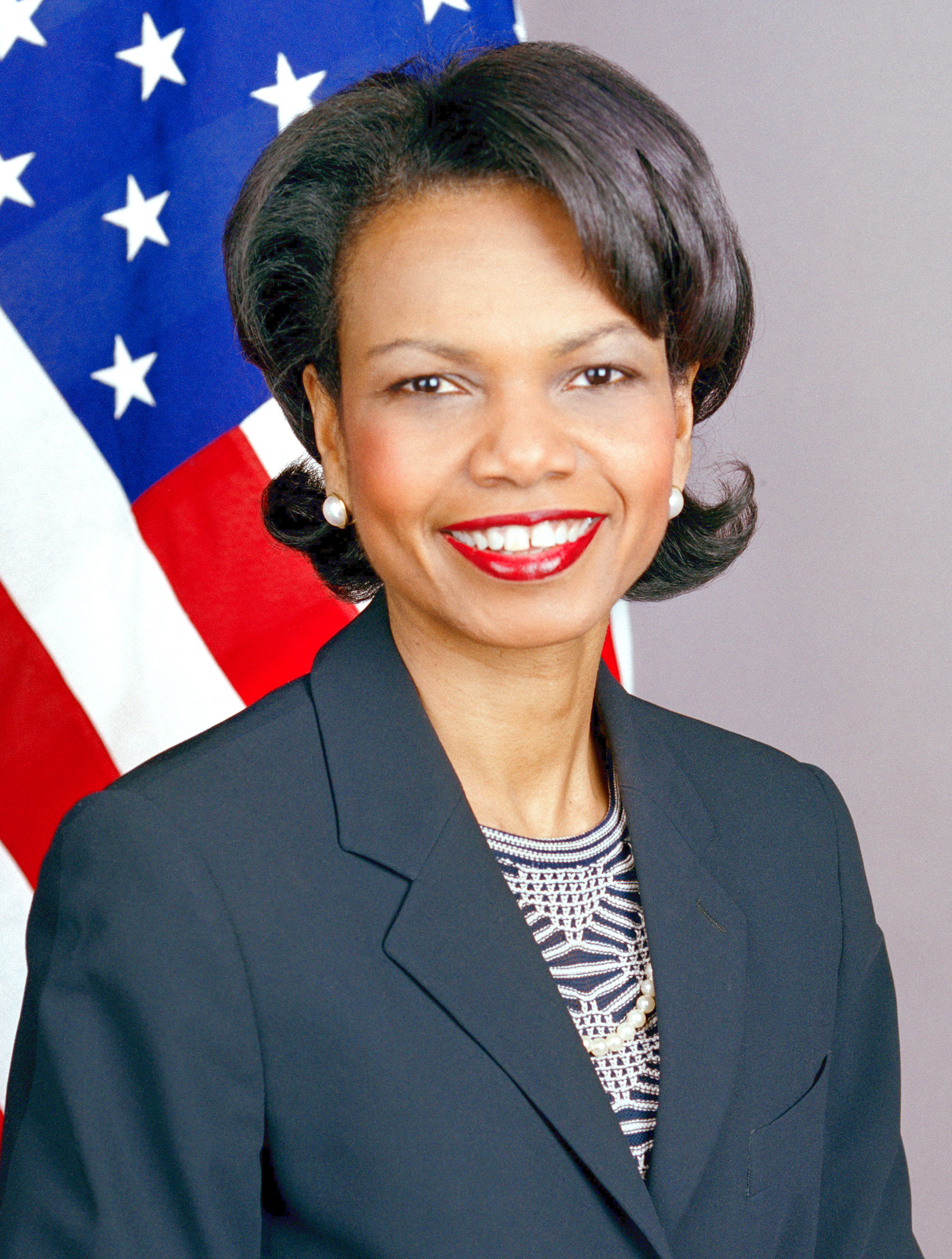
Condoleezza Rice

1. (European Union) Angela Merkel, Chancellor of Germany
2. Condoleezza Rice, United States Secretary of State
3. Wu Yi, Vice Premier of the People's Republic of China
4. (United States) Indra Nooyi, Chairman and CEO of PepsiCo
5. (United States) Anne Mulcahy, Chairman and CEO of Xerox
6. (United States) Sallie Krawcheck, CFO of Citigroup
7. (United States) Patricia Woertz, President-CEO of ADM
8. (France) (European Union) Anne Lauvergeon, CEO of Areva
9. (United States) Brenda Barnes, President-CEO of Sara Lee
10. (United States) Zoe Cruz, Co-President of Morgan Stanley

== 2005 ==
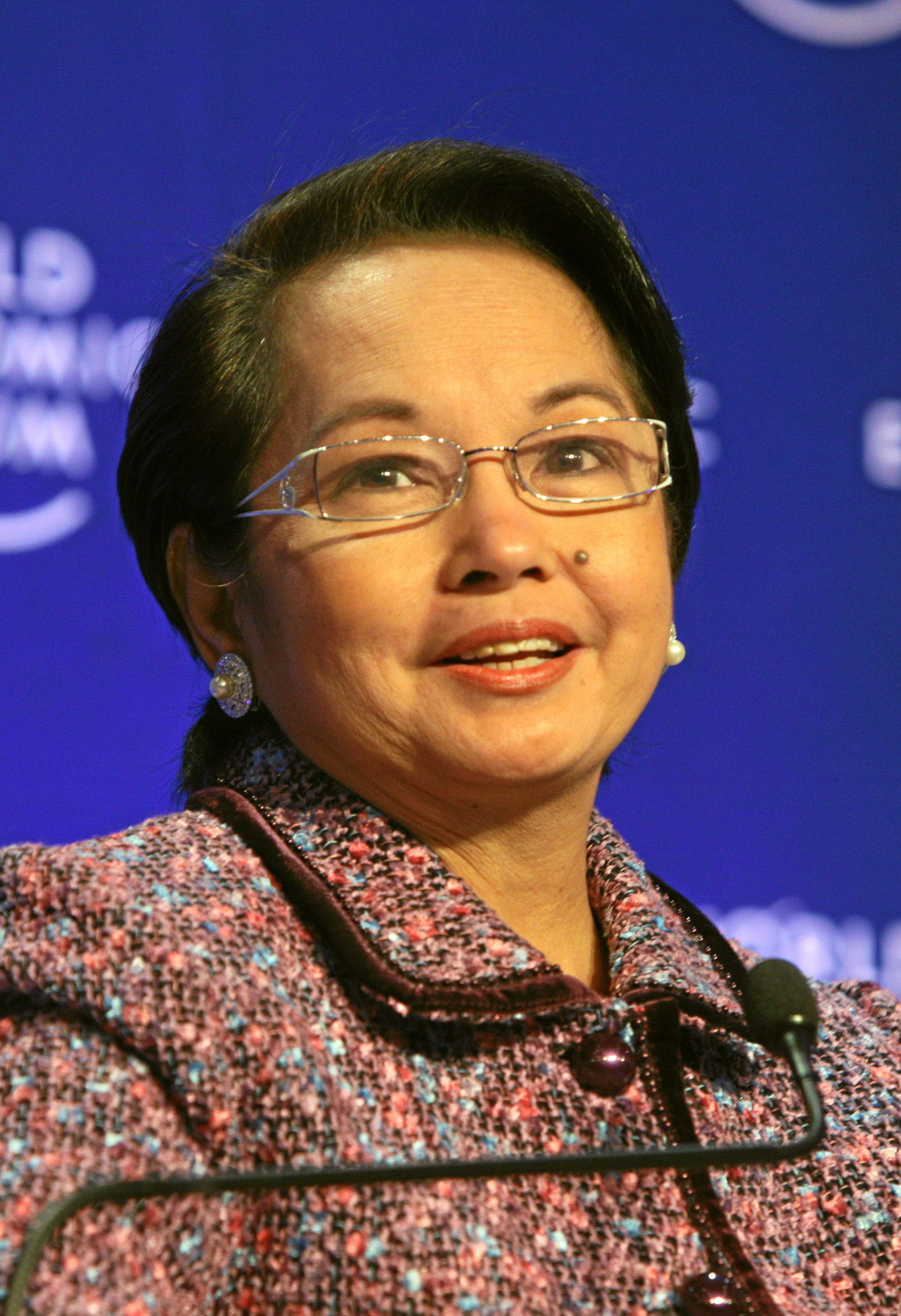
Gloria Macapagal Arroyo

1. Condoleezza Rice, United States Secretary of State
2. Wu Yi, Vice Premier of the People's Republic of China
3. Yulia Tymoshenko, Prime Minister of Ukraine
4. Gloria Macapagal Arroyo, President of the Philippines
5. (United States) Meg Whitman, President-CEO of eBay
6. (United States) Anne Mulcahy, Chairman and CEO of Xerox
7. (United States) Sallie Krawcheck, CFO of Citigroup
8. (United States) Brenda Barnes, President-CEO of Sara Lee
9. (United States) Oprah Winfrey, talk show host on The Oprah Winfrey Show
10. (United States) Melinda Gates, Co-Chair of the Bill & Melinda Gates Foundation

== 2004 ==
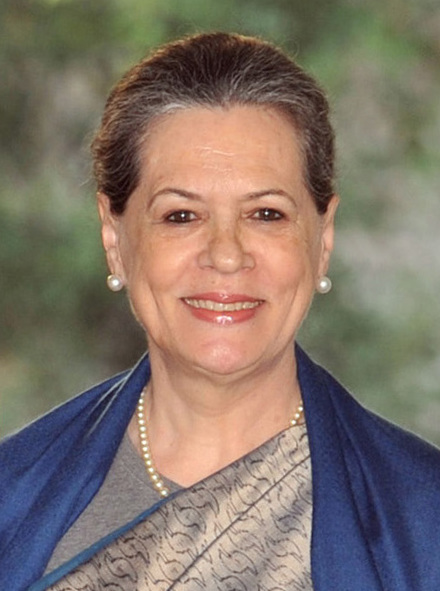
Sonia Gandhi

1. Condoleezza Rice, United States National Security Advisor
2. Wu Yi, Vice Premier of the People's Republic of China
3. (India) Sonia Gandhi, President of the Indian National Congress
4. Laura Bush, First Lady of the United States
5. Hillary Clinton, United States Senator
6. Sandra Day O'Connor, Associate Justice of the Supreme Court of the United States
7. Ruth Bader Ginsburg, Associate Justice of the Supreme Court of the United States
8. Megawati Sukarnoputri, President of Indonesia
9. Gloria Macapagal Arroyo, President of the Philippines
10. (United States) Carly Fiorina, CEO of Hewlett-Packard

== See also ==
- Forbes list of the World's Most Powerful People
- 40 Under 40
