= List of acquisitions by Accenture =

Following is a list of acquisitions by Accenture from 2013 until the present. Accenture plc is an American professional services company nominally based in Dublin for tax sheltering, specializing in information technology services and consulting.

It has been a very acquisitive company, completing more than 350 acquisitions since it split off from Arthur Andersen. The value of each acquisition is listed if known. If the value of an acquisition is not listed, then it is undisclosed.

== Acquisitions ==
Date	Company	Accenture unit	Country	Value (Million USD/EUR)	Ref.
July 2013	Acquity Group	Accenture Digital	United States	$316 million	
December 2013	Procurian	Accenture Business Process Outsourcing	United States	$375 million	
December 2013	evopro	Accenture Industry X	Hungary		
May 2014	Enkitec	Accenture Oracle Engineered Systems	United States		
June 2016	Maglan	Accenture Cyber Fusion	Israel		
August 2017	Search Technologies	Accenture Insights Platform	United States		
November 2018	Kolle Rebbe	Accenture Song	Germany		
March 2020	Context Information Security		United Kingdom	£107 mil	
April 2020	ESR Labs	Accenture Industry X	Germany		
May 2020	Byte Prophecy	Accenture Applied Intelligence	India		
October 2020	SALT Solutions		Germany		
February 2021	Infinity Works		United Kingdom		
February 2021	REPL		United Kingdom		
March 2021	Alfa Consulting	Accenture Supply Chain & Operations	Spain		
April 2021	Cygni	Accenture Cloud First	Sweden		
April 2021	Ergo	Accenture Cloud First	Argentina		
April 2021	Pollux	Accenture Industry X	Brazil		
April 2021	Avieco	Accenture Sustainability Services	United Kingdom		
April 2021	CoreCompete	Accenture Strategy & Consulting	United States		
April 2021	AFD.tech	Accenture Cloud First	France		
June 2021	Novetta	Accenture Federal Services	United States		
July 2021	Trivadis AG	Accenture Cloud First	Germany		
July 2021	Linkbynet	Accenture Cloud First	France		
October 2021	umlaut	Accenture Industry X & Cloud First	Germany		
October 2021	Bridgei2i	Accenture Applied Intelligence	India		
December 2021	Zestgroup	Accenture Sustainability Services	Netherlands		
April 2022	Greenfish	Accenture Sustainability Services	France		
April 2022	Eclipse Automation	Accenture Industry X	Canada		
May 2022	akzente	Accenture Sustainability Services	Germany		
September 2022	Sentia	Accenture Cloud First	Netherlands		
September 2022	MacGregor Partners	Accenture Supply Chain & Operations	United States		
September 2022	Carbon Intelligence	Accenture Sustainability Services	United Kingdom		
November 2022	ALBERT	Accenture Applied Intelligence	Japan		
February 2023	Bionest	Accenture Strategy	United States		
February 2023	SKS Group	Accenture Technology	Germany		
March 2023	Flutura	Accenture Applied Intelligence	India		
June 2023	Nextira	Accenture AWS Business Group	United States		
June 2023	Bourne Digital	Accenture SAP Business Group	Australia		
September 2023	Nautilus Consulting	Accenture Health Strategy & Consulting	United Kingdom		
November 2023	Ocelot Consulting	Accenture AWS Business Group	United States		
November 2023	Solnet	Accenture Cloud First	New Zealand		
December 2023	6point6	Accenture UK Secure Transformation Services	United Kingdom		
March 2024	The Lumery	Accenture Song	Australia		
March 2024	Udacity	Accenture LearnVantage	United States		
March 2024	mindcurv	Accenture Song	Germany		
April 2024	Axis Corporate	Accenture Financial Services	Spain		
May 2024	Cognosante	Accenture Federal Services	United States		
July 2024	Excelmax Technologies		India		
March 2025	Soben		United Kingdom		
March 2025	Halfspace	Center for Advanced AI; Faculty	Denmark	undisclosed	
April 2025	TalentSprint	Accenture LearnVantage	India		
August 2025	CyberCX	Accenture Cybersecurity	Australia	$650 million	
August 2025	NeuraFlash	Salesforce & AWS gen AI and ML	United States	undisclosed	
October 2025	Decho	Palantir solutions	United Kingdom	undisclosed	
January 2026	Faculty	AI and decision intelligence	United Kingdom	$1 billion	
March 2026	Ookla	data	United States	$1.2 billion	
