= Julie Sweet =

American business executive (born 1967)

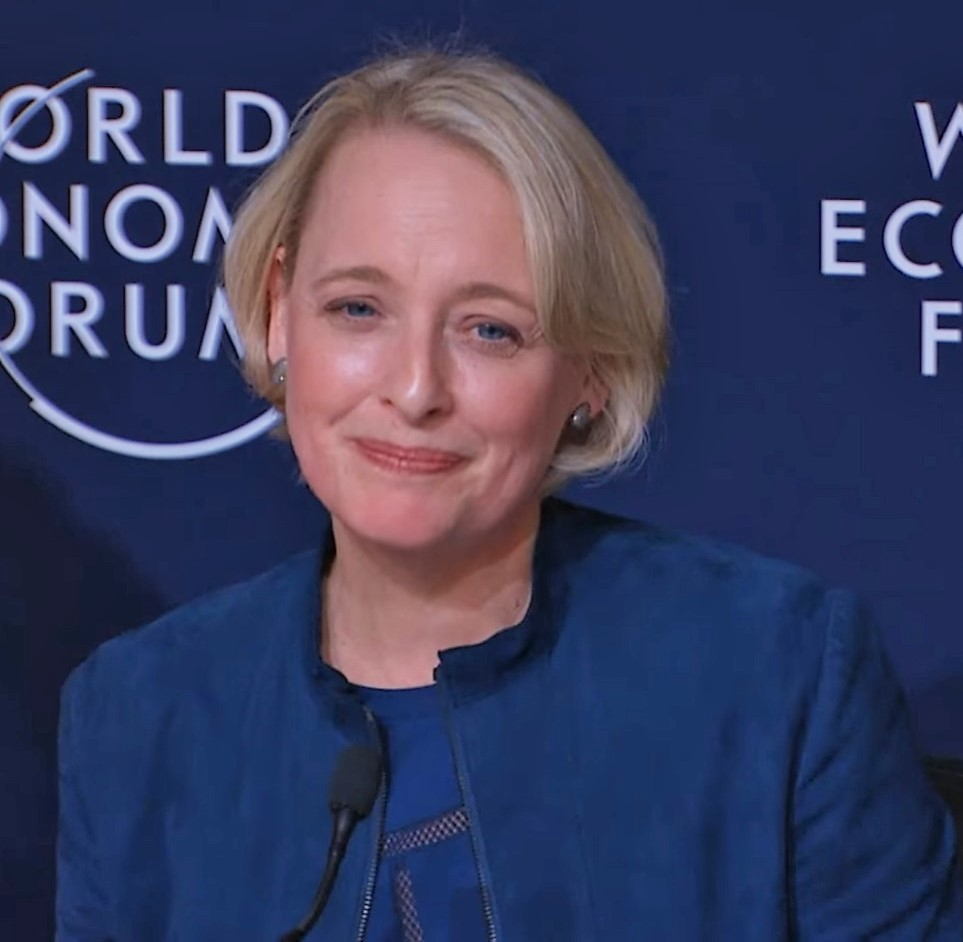
- Sweet in 2019
- Born: Julie Spellman; 1967 (age 58–59)
- Education: Claremont McKenna College (BA); Columbia University (JD)
- Occupation: Businesswoman
- Title: Chair and CEO, Accenture
- Spouse: Chad Creighton Sweet (m. 2004)
- Children: 2

Julie Terese Sweet (née Spellman, born 1967) is an American business executive and attorney. She is chair and chief executive officer (CEO) of Accenture, a multinational professional services company.

== Early life and education ==
Julie Sweet was born in 1967 and raised in Tustin, California. She competed in speech and debate at Tustin High School. She earned a bachelor's degree from Claremont McKenna College, and a J.D. degree from Columbia Law School.

== Career ==
Prior her tenure with Accenture, Sweet was an attorney at law firm Cravath, Swaine & Moore. She worked at the firm for 17 years and was partner for 10. Sweet was the ninth woman ever to make partner at the firm. She worked on financing, mergers and acquisitions, and general corporate counsel.

=== Accenture ===
Accenture recruited Sweet as general counsel in 2010. In 2015, she became CEO of Accenture's North America business, the company's largest market. Since early in her career at Accenture, she has been on the company's global management committee. Alongside then-CEO Pierre Nanterme, Sweet developed Accenture's mergers and acquisitions strategy.

Accenture named Sweet its CEO effective September 2019, the first woman to hold that position. She replaced interim CEO David Rowland. At the time of her appointment, she was one of 27 women leading companies in the S&P 500 and the 15th female CEO of all Fortune Global 500 companies. In September 2021, Sweet became chair of Accenture.

As CEO, Sweet has advocated for diversity, inclusion, and workplace gender parity. Sweet supports Accenture's goal to have a staff equally represented by men and women by 2025; as of 2019, 42 percent of Accenture's staff was female. Sweet was named a top CEO for diversity by the website Comparably in 2019. In February 2025, under Sweet's leadership, Accenture discontinued these global employee representation goals and paused participation in external diversity benchmarking surveys.

Sweet has called for addressing the skills gap in the U.S. and supported the national apprenticeship movement. She participated in The New York Times's New Rules Summit.

Sweet indicated in 2023 that she wants to double the number of Accenture employees primarily skilled in artificial intelligence (AI) and data-related fields. In 2024, Sweet announced Accenture's plans to open 10 generative AI 'innovation hubs' around the world.

In 2023, Sweet's total compensation at Accenture was $31.6 million.

=== Board membership ===
In addition to Accenture's board of directors, Sweet has been a member of The Business Council, the Business Roundtable, and Catalyst. She has also been on the trustee boards for the Center for Strategic and International Studies, the World Economic Forum, and Bridges from School to Work, which was established by the founders of Marriott International.

== Personal life ==
Sweet is married to Chad Creighton Sweet, and has two daughters. They live in Bethesda, Maryland.

== Recognition ==
The New York Times called Sweet "one of the most powerful women in corporate America" in 2019. Fortune magazine included Julie Sweet in their "Most Powerful Women" list since 2016, and she was named No. 1 on the list for 2020. Fortune noted she "steered Accenture's more than half a million employees in 51 countries through the pandemic." Sweet has subsequently been ranked by Fortune as No. 3 on the list for 2021, and No. 2 on the list for 2022.

Sweet was included in the list of "World's 100 most powerful women" by Forbes (in sixth position) in 2025. She was previously ranked seventh in 2024, 11th in 2023, ninth in 2022, and tenth in 2021.

In 2024, the Anti-Defamation League gave Sweet its 2024 Courage Against Hate Award.
