= Santanu Paul =

Indian entrepreneur, technocrat and opinion writer

- Education: University of Michigan, Indian Institute of Technology, Madras
- Occupations: CEO and MD of TalentSprint
- Spouse: Radha Rangarajan
- Website: talentsprint.com

Santanu Paul is an entrepreneur, technocrat and opinion writer. He is the founder and a former CEO of TalentSprint, a global EdTech company that offers transformational learning programs for new-age professionals.

== Early life and education ==
Paul received his B.Tech. from IIT Madras and his Ph.D. from the University of Michigan, Ann Arbor, both in computer science. His academic record over time earned him the Rackham Doctoral Fellowship, the IBM Canada Fellowship, the LaCroute Fellowship, and the National Talent Scholarship.

== Career ==
From 2003 to 2008, Paul worked for Virtusa Corporation as senior vice president for global delivery operations and head of Indian operations, and was part of the global leadership team when the company went public on NASDAQ in 2007. From 1999 to 2003, Paul worked as chief technology officer at Viveca and OpenPages, both venture-backed technology firms based in Boston. From 1995 to 1998, he was a computer scientist at IBM T.J. Watson Research Center in Yorktown Heights, New York.

Paul co-founded TalentSprint, a for-profit, high-impact platform. He has led the TalentSprint team to fifteen awards as well as multiple venture capital raises from Nexus Venture Partners and the National Skill Development Corporation (NSDC)

He is an author or co-author of twenty international technology papers and two United States patents. He is an independent board director at the National Payments Corporation of India and NSDL Payments Bank. Paul is a conference speaker and panel moderator, and his op-ed pieces and columns appear frequently in media.

On occasion, he teaches entrepreneurship at the Indian Institute of Technology, advises the Indian banking sector on technology trends and talent search, and conducts leadership clinics for corporate leaders. He is a member of the Young Presidents' Organization (YPO).
