= Sashi Reddi =

American entrepreneur (born 1965)

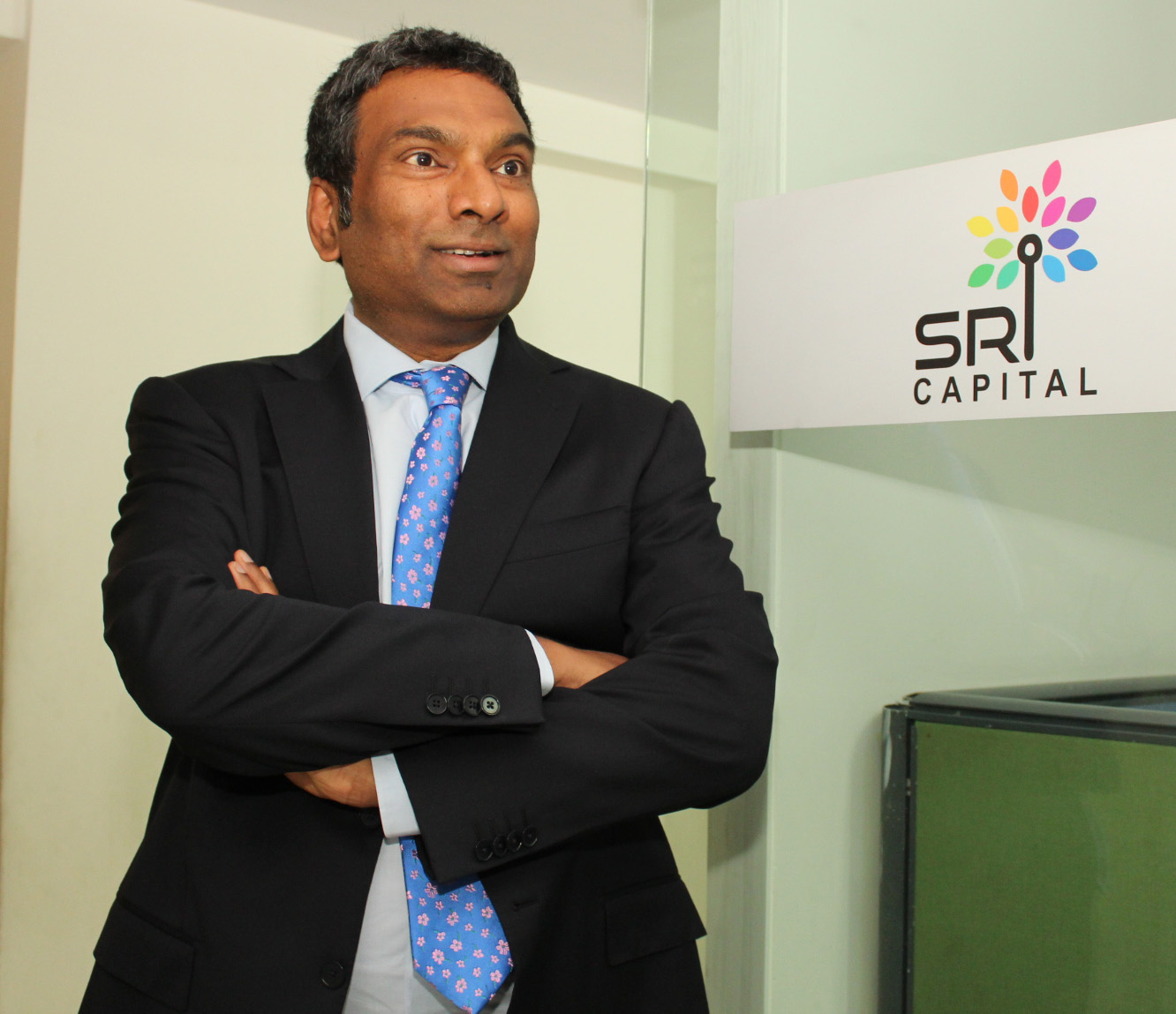
- Born: 1965 (age 60–61); Madras, Tamil Nadu, India (now Chennai, Tamil Nadu)
- Education: The Lawrence School, Lovedale; IIT Delhi; New York University; Wharton School of Business
- Occupations: Entrepreneur Technology Visionary Angel Investor, Venture Capitalist SRI Capital

Sashi Parvatha Reddi is an entrepreneur, venture capitalist and a philanthropist. Sashi Reddi was the CEO and founder of AppLabs. Sashi Reddi was born in Madras, India and later migrated to the US. He grew up in Guntur but attended boarding school at Lawrence School, Lovedale. He is a recipient of the Louis Braille Award from the Pennsylvania Council for the Blind, for the year 2017. He currently sits on the advisory board of the Wharton Entrepreneurial Programs and the advisory board of IIT Hyderabad.

== Early life and education ==
Sashi studied in a boarding school, The Lawrence School, Lovedale, near Ooty. He secured a Bachelor of Technology in Computer Science and Engineering in 1987 from Indian Institute of Technology Delhi. He did his MS in Computer Science from Courant Institute of Mathematical Sciences at New York University. He obtained a PhD in Operations and Information Management from University of Pennsylvania – The Wharton School.

== Entrepreneur ==
He established a web content management company, EZPower Systems, in 1994. This was acquired in 1998 by DocuCorp (Nasdaq: DOCC) which is now a part of Oracle. Sashi was founder and CEO of AppLabs, a software testing company based out of Philadelphia, the US, which was acquired by Computer Sciences Corporation (NYSE: CSC) in September 2011. Post acquisition, Reddi took over the leadership of the Independent Testing Services division within CSC and in September 2012 was elevated to lead CSC's big data and analytics business.

== Investments and funding ==
SRI Capital is among the first few institutional investors in various technology and media start-ups in India and United States, with over 20 investments.

== Awards and recognitions ==
Year	Award category	Result
2012	TalentSprint Special Recognition Award	Won
2017	Honorary Chair 57th Annual Louis Braille Awards	Won
