= William D. Green =

American business executive (born 1953)

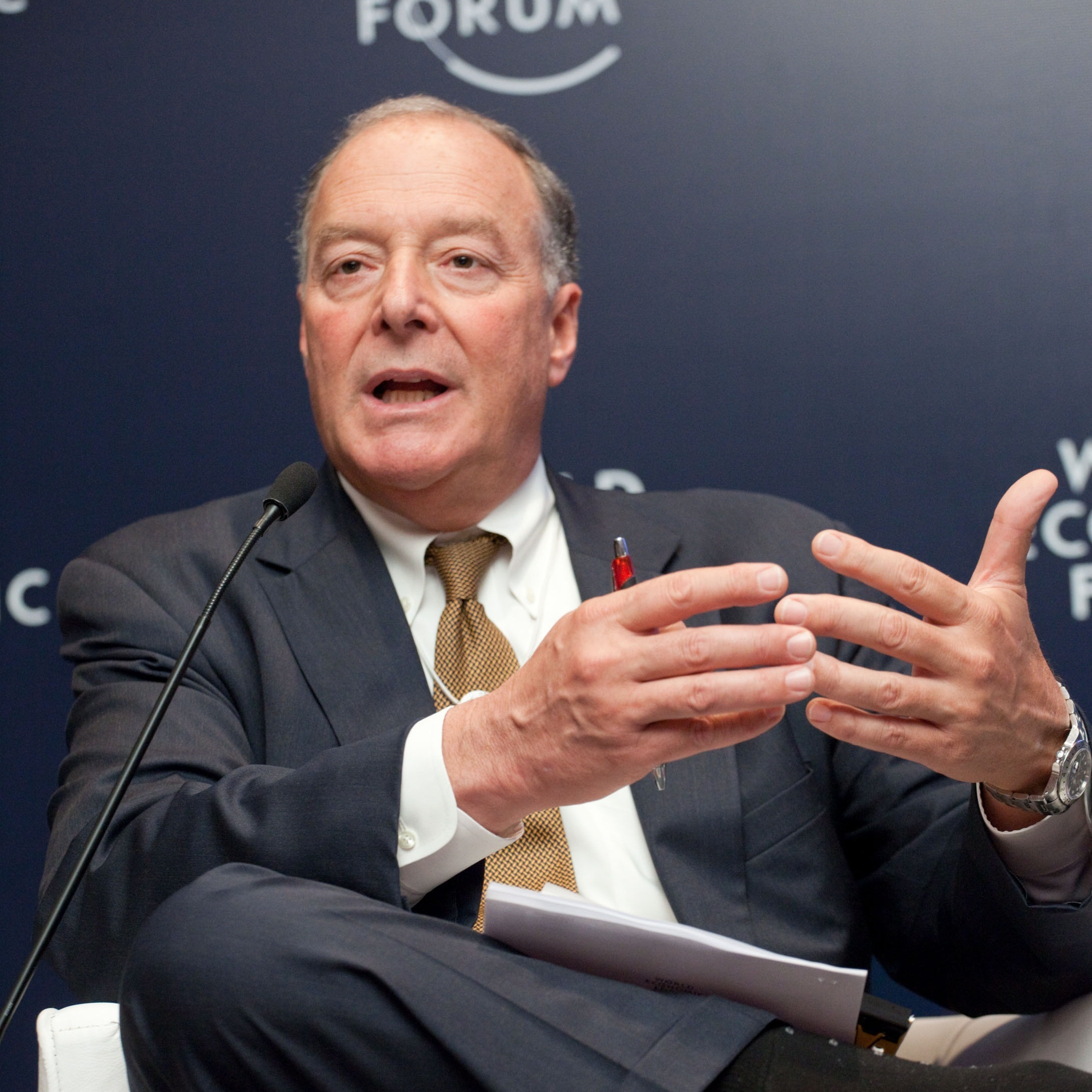
- William D. Green at the World Economic Forum on Latin America in 2011
- Born: August 1953 (age 73); Hampden, Massachusetts, United States
- Education: Dean College; Babson College (MBA)
- Predecessor: Joe Forehand
- Successor: Pierre Nanterme

William "Bill" D. Green (born August 1953) is an American business executive. He was the executive chairman of the global Accenture management consulting firm.

== Early life ==
Green was raised in Hampden, Massachusetts and did odd jobs managing horses, assisting electricians, and in construction. He was the first in his family to attain a college education, graduating from Dean College before attaining a degree in economics from Babson College and later an MBA from the same institution.

== Accenture ==
Green joined Accenture, then part of Andersen Consulting, in 1977 right out of college. He has held the chief operating officer position as well as being the chief executive of the resource operating group. He was a key part of the split from Andersen Worldwide Société Coopérative that led to the incorporation of Accenture.

He became the CEO on September 1, 2004. In 2009, Green drew a base salary of $1,237,500, with a total compensation of $18,277,099 including stock awards and incentives. Green retired from his position as CEO, effective January 1, 2011, and was replaced by Pierre Nanterme. Green retained his position as executive chairman of Accenture. On October 22, 2012, Accenture announced that Green will step down as chairman in February 2013 and retire from Accenture. CEO Pierre Nanterme will succeed Green as chairman.

On May 10, 2022, Green joined the board of BMC Software as chair.
