= Brenda C. Barnes =

American businesswoman (1953–2017)

- Born: Brenda Czajka; November 11, 1953; Chicago, Illinois, U.S.
- Died: January 17, 2017 (aged 63); Naperville, Illinois, U.S.
- Education: Augustana College; Loyola University Chicago
- Occupation: CEO of Sara Lee 2005-2010

Brenda Czajka Barnes (November 11, 1953 – January 17, 2017) was an American businesswoman who served as president, chairman and chief executive of Sara Lee, and was the first female CEO at PepsiCo.

== Education ==
Barnes received a BA in Economics in 1975 from Augustana College, and an MBA in 1978 from Loyola University Chicago. In 1997 she was awarded an honorary doctor of humane letters from Augustana College.

== Career ==
After working as a business manager for Wilson Sporting Goods in 1976 and Vice President of Marketing for Frito-Lay in 1981, Barnes became Group VP of Marketing for PepsiCo in 1984. She became President of Pepsi-Cola South/West in 1991, and COO of PepsiCo North America in 1993. Finally, in 1996, she became president and CEO of Pepsi-Cola North America, a job she left in 1997 to spend more time with her family, a move that made national headlines.

After PepsiCo, she spent time as interim president and COO of Starwood, from November 1999 to March 2000, and as an adjunct professor, Northwestern University's Kellogg School of Management and at North Central College in 2002.

In July 2004, she became president and COO of Sara Lee Corp. In February 2005, she became president and CEO of Sara Lee, and in October 2005, chairman and CEO. While there, Barnes moved Sara Lee's headquarters out of downtown Chicago to suburban Downers Grove.

Barnes was on the board of directors of Avon Products, Inc.; Augustana College; Grocery Manufacturers Association; LucasFilm, Ltd.; The New York Times Company; PepsiAmericas, Inc.; Sara Lee Corporation; Sears, Roebuck & Co.; and Staples Inc. She was also on the steering Committee of the Kellogg Center for Executive Women, Northwestern University.

While CEO of Sara Lee in 2008, Barnes earned a total compensation of $10,489,347, which included a base salary of $1,000,000, a cash bonus of $1,993,597, stocks granted of $4,866,000, and options granted of $2,398,668.

Brenda joined the Rehabilitation Institute of Chicago in 2014 as a distinguished member on the Board of Directors and the Identity Cabinet committee to help form and build the hospital branding and positioning.

== Personal life ==
Born as Brenda Czajka on November 11 1953, she was the third of seven girls and was raised in River Grove, Illinois. Prior to college, Brenda attended East Leyden High School in Franklin Park, Illinois. She was a smart student and dedicated herself to studying. A graduate from Augustana College even said, "She didn't join a sorority, didn't do cheerleading. She didn't get into that part of college." She was raised by her parents to be humble. Barnes told Shelley Donald Coolidge of the Christian Science Monitor, "My parents gave me a strong work ethic and the ability to listen to people and value what they have to say and do. That base foundation of values helped me tremendously."

Barnes married Randall Barnes in 1980 and they had two sons and a daughter. The marriage ended in divorce. She had a stroke in May 2010, at a gym in Chicago, which caused her to leave Sara Lee. In 2012, Barnes was still getting phone calls about potential board openings but turned them down to focus on her health. On January 15, 2017, she suffered another stroke and died two days later, survived by her children and Sal Barrutia, her partner of eight years.

== Recognition ==
Barnes was listed in Forbes list of The World's 100 Most Powerful Women in 2004, appearing in the top ten in 2005 and 2006. In 2009 she was ranked 29th in Forbes list of The World's 100 Most Powerful Women.

She was inducted as a Laureate of The Lincoln Academy of Illinois and awarded the Order of Lincoln (the state's highest honor) by the Governor of Illinois in 2013 in the area of Business & Industry.

== See also ==
- List of female top executives
