= Joe Forehand =

American businessman

- Born: Alexander City, Alabama, U.S.
- Education: Krannert Graduate School of Management, Auburn University
- Occupation: Business executive
- Employer: First Data

Joe Forehand is an American business executive and a member of the board of directors of First Data. Before joining First Data, he served as a chairman and CEO of Accenture. He became CEO in November 1999 (then Andersen Consulting), and chairman in February 2001.

Forehand was born in Alexander City, Alabama. In 1971, he graduated with a bachelor's degree in industrial engineering from Auburn University where he was a member of the Pi Kappa Phi fraternity. Forehand received his MBA in industrial administration from the Krannert School of Management at Purdue University, West Lafayette, Indiana.

In an Accenture internal memo and corresponding press release in April 2004, the Accenture board of directors announced that Forehand would relinquish the office of CEO in September 2004. William D. Green assumed the job of CEO effective that same month.

In 2006, Forehand retired from Accenture, ending his term as chairman and 33 years with the firm. He became a member of Aricent's board later in the year.

From 2007 to 2015 he was a director of Auburn University Foundation.

In March 2010, Forehand was appointed interim CEO of First Data Corp., succeeding Michael Capellas.

From January to March 2019, Forehand served as Executive in Residence through a joint venture between Auburn University's Samuel Ginn College of Engineering and the Harbert College of Business.

In 2019, Forehand was inducted into the Alabama Business Hall of Fame. The induction ceremony took place in Birmingham.
