= Cynthia Carroll =

British businesswoman

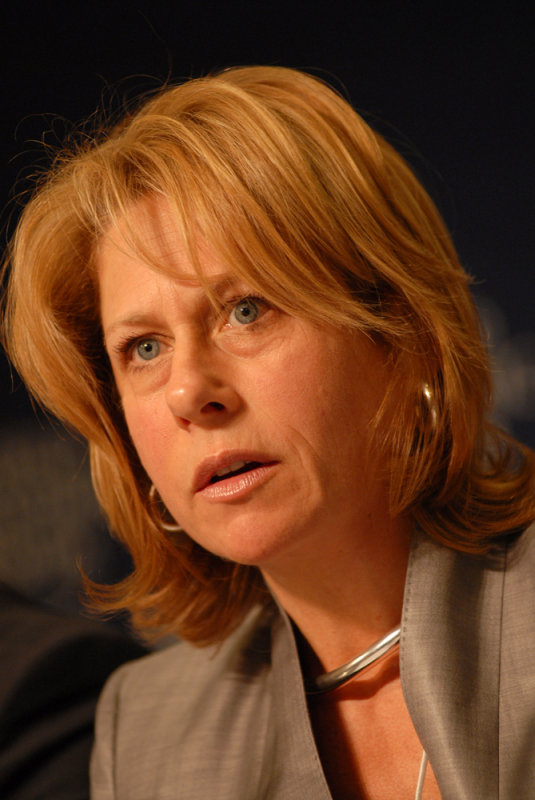
- Carroll in 2009
- Born: November 13, 1956 (age 69); New Jersey
- Education: Skidmore College (BS), University of Kansas (MS), Harvard University (MBA)
- Occupation: Chief Executive Officer

Cynthia Blum Carroll (born 13 November 1956) is an American businesswoman. She was the chief executive officer of Anglo American, a British mining company and one of the world's largest platinum producers.

== Education and personal life ==
Carroll graduated from Skidmore College in 1978, a Bachelor of Science in Geology. She holds a Masters of Science degree in Geology from the University of Kansas (1982) and a Masters of Business Administration from Harvard University (1989).

She is married with four children.

== Career ==
On 24 October 2006, Carroll was hired by Anglo American, and joined the board in January 2007, becoming chief executive at the beginning of March 2007. She chaired Anglo American’s Executive Committee and sat on the Safety and Sustainable Development Committee. She was one of only three female chief executives of FTSE 100 companies and the first non-South African to hold the post with Anglo American.

In 2007, she took a role of non-executive director of BP.

In 2009, Carroll was ranked by Forbes magazine as the fourth most powerful woman in the world. This was up from ranking fifth in 2008, and seventh in 2007.

On 26 October 2012, Anglo American announced that Carroll would step down as chief executive.

In 2012 she was elected a fellow of the Royal Academy of Engineering.

Carroll previously worked for Alcan, as president and chief executive officer of the Primary Metal Group since 2002. She joined Alcan in 1989. In January 1996 she was promoted to managing director of the Aughinish Alumina division, located on Aughinish Island, Askeaton, County Limerick, Ireland. Before joining Alcan, she worked for Amoco, which is now part of BP, for eight years as a petroleum geologist, from 1982 to 1987, working in gas and oil exploration in Colorado, Alaska, Wyoming, Utah, and Montana.

She formerly served as a director of Sara Lee and AngloGold Ashanti Limited. She also sits on the Boards of American Aluminium Association and the International Aluminium Institute.

Cynthia Carroll has launched a number of new initiatives within the business, including an asset optimisation project; the introduction of the value based management methodology within Anglo American; and a push to improve safety performance. In 2007, she closed two platinum shafts in South Africa following a number of fatalities until the workforce received more safety training. She participated in the Tripartite Safety Summit in 2008 with union, government and industry representatives to address safety concerns in the mining industry Since Cynthia Carroll took over as chief executive, Anglo American has acquired stakes in two copper projects Michiquillay in Peru and Pebble in the US; a coal company Foxleigh in Australia; and the iron ore project in Brazil, Minas-Rio.
