= Faculty (company) =

British technology company

- Formerly: Advanced Skills Initiative, ASI Data Science
- Type: Subsidiary
- Industry: Artificial intelligence
- Founded: 2014; 12 years ago (as Advanced Skills Initiative)
- Founder: Marc Warner
- Headquarters: London, United Kingdom
- Key people: Marc Warner, Chief Executive Officer
- Parent: Accenture
- Website: faculty.ai

Faculty is a British technology company based in London, UK. It provides software, consulting, and services related to artificial intelligence. The company was founded in 2014 as a fellowship programme for PhD graduates. Some of its governmental and political work has attracted conflict of interest concerns. In January 2026, the professional services firm Accenture acquired the company.

== History ==
Faculty was founded by Marc Warner, Angie Ma and Andy Brookes in 2014, under the name Advanced Skills Initiative (ASI) as a fellowship programme for PhD graduates. The company received £1.5m in funding in November 2016 with backers including Robin Klein and Jaan Tallinn. By 2021, 300 graduates and 200 companies had used the fellowship programme.

In May 2017, The Observer published an investigative article by Carole Cadwalladr which revealed links between Faculty and Cambridge Analytica, which was central to the Facebook–Cambridge Analytica data scandal. The investigation revealed that staff had moved between the two companies and that they jointly hosted events. Faculty was paid £114,000 by Vote Leave for services during the 2016 Brexit referendum. The Guardian revealed in 2020 that Faculty had received £260,000 from Dominic Cummings's private company, Dynamic Maps in 2018 and 2019.

The company was renamed to its current name, "Faculty", in February 2019. According to Faculty, it stopped doing political work that same year.

In May 2021, Faculty raised £30 million in funding from the Apax Digital Fund, bringing their total funding raised to £40 million. The funding was expected to create 400 new jobs. In June 2021, Janine Lloyd-Jones joined Faculty from the Foreign Office as the company's first marketing and communications director, having worked in government communications for 15 years.

In January 2026, the consulting company Accenture agreed to acquire Faculty for over £740 million as it sought to improve the company's AI capabilities. The Financial Times reported that the exact terms of the deal were not disclosed but analysts considered it to make Faculty the first British AI company of 2026 to achieve unicorn status (a valuation of over $1 billion). Upon completion of the acquisition, Faculty CEO Marc Warner was also to become chief technology officer of Accenture.

== Government work ==
In February 2018, the Home Office and ASI developed a terrorist content blocking tool that claimed to identify 94% of Daesh propaganda, aiding in preventing it from being uploaded to the Internet. It was reported by Wired magazine that Daesh could easily dodge the tool. In 2019, it was then reported by the Financial Times that the tool had not been adopted by any companies, even after it had been offered free of charge.

Faculty was awarded at least £3 million in government contracts between early 2018 and July 2020. In 2020, Faculty won a £400,000 contract to assist the Ministry of Housing Communities and Local Government in the United Kingdom in its response to COVID-19. Faculty also worked with the NHS during the pandemic to predict hospital admissions and to help the NHS decide where to send equipment, such as ventilators.

=== Conflict of interest concerns ===
Faculty had connections to political figures in the government led by Boris Johnson. In some instances, Faculty's government contracts have raised conflict of interest concerns. Faculty said it complies with conflict of interest best practices and government procurement procedures.

Faculty founder Marc Warner's brother was a political advisor with access to the meetings of the Scientific Advisory Group for Emergencies (SAGE). His brother also worked with Dominic Cummings on the Vote Leave campaign for which Faculty was later hired. A Faculty executive was on the board of CDEI, when CDEI chose to hire Faculty. Faculty said the executive recused himself from the decision. The Department of Health gave Faculty £400,000 worth of COVID-related contracts without getting competitive bids due to an "urgent need to bring in additional analytics support to help inform our response to the coronavirus pandemic", according to the department. Additionally, politician Lord Agnew, the Cabinet Office minister with responsibility, for promoting the use of technology in public services, owned £90,000 worth of Faculty's shares that were purchased in 2016. Agnew gave up control of his shares to a blind trust in September 2020 while remaining entitled to the financial returns. A National Audit Office investigation found that he and other ministers had properly declared their interests in such cases and there was 'no evidence of their involvement in procurement decisions or contract management'.

During Faculty's COVID-related work, Faculty founder Marc Warner attended a SAGE meeting, raising criticisms about the prospects of a private company influencing government policies. Warner said he was there at their client's request and would attend whatever meetings their client, the National Health Service, felt were useful. The project also prompted concerns regarding the privacy of patient data used for the project. The company responded that it did not have access to any health data through its work on the project and the data was anonymous.

== Services ==
Faculty develops artificial intelligence software for technology, healthcare, engineering, and governmental organisations. Example projects include working to reduce the number of flyers mailed that are unlikely to result in purchases and reducing the number of sandwiches stored on planes that go to waste. In 2020, Warner stated that about 80 percent of its business comes from the private sector with the remainder from government work. Faculty clients typically own the models that are developed for them, though Faculty retains the right to use certain algorithms and libraries for other clients.
