= Accenture =

Irish professional services company

Accenture plc

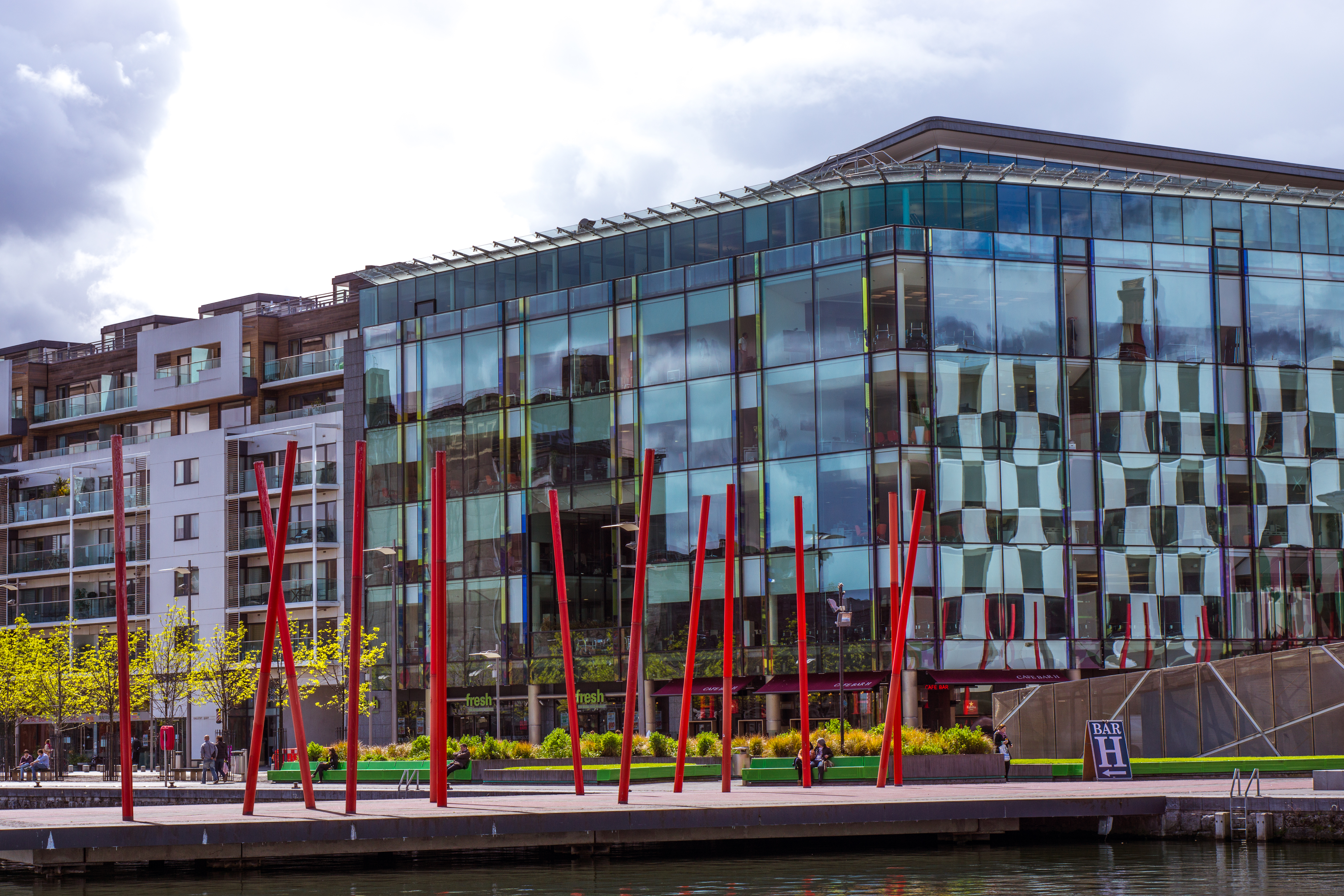
- Headquarters at 1 Grand Canal Square, Dublin in 2012
- Formerly: Andersen Consulting (1989–2000)
- Type: Public limited company
- Traded as: NYSE: ACN (Class A); S&P 100 component; S&P 500 component
- ISIN: IE00B4BNMY34
- Industry: Professional services; Management consulting; Information technology
- Predecessor: Arthur Andersen
- Founded: 1989; 37 years ago
- Headquarters: Dublin, Ireland
- Area served: Worldwide
- Key people: Julie Sweet (chair and CEO)
- Services: Management consulting; Information technology consulting; Systems integration; Cloud computing; Business process outsourcing; Cybersecurity
- Revenue: ▲US$74.18 billion (2026)
- Operating income: ▲US$11.41 billion (2026)
- Net income: ▲US$8.52 billion (2026)
- Total assets: ▲US$73.60 billion (2026)
- Total equity: ▲US$32.72 billion (2026)
- Number of employees: 814,000 (2026)
- Subsidiaries: Avanade; Droga5; Udacity; TalentSprint; Faculty; Ookla
- Website: accenture.com

Accenture plc is a technology consulting company headquartered in Dublin, Ireland. Founded in 1989 in the United States, Accenture provides information technology and management consulting services across 120 countries globally.

== History ==
=== Formation and early years, 1950–1989 ===
Accenture began as the business and technology consulting division of accounting firm Arthur Andersen in the early 1950s. The division conducted a feasibility study for General Electric to install a computer at Appliance Park in Louisville, Kentucky, which led to GE's installation of a UNIVAC I computer and printer, believed to be the first commercial use of a computer in the United States.

=== Split from Arthur Andersen and renaming, 1989–2001 ===
In 1989, Arthur Andersen and Andersen Consulting became separate units of Andersen Worldwide Société Coopérative (AWSC), a Swiss coordinating entity. Throughout the 1990s, tensions grew between the two units. Andersen Consulting was paying Arthur Andersen up to 15% of its profits each year (a provision of the 1989 split was that the more profitable unit – whether AA or AC – pays the other 15 percent), while at the same time Arthur Andersen was competing with Andersen Consulting through its own newly established business consulting service line called Arthur Andersen Business Consulting. In 2000, as a result of arbitration, Andersen Consulting broke all contractual ties with AWSC and Arthur Andersen. As part of the arbitration settlement, Andersen Consulting paid $1.2 billion to Arthur Andersen.

On 1 January 2001, Andersen Consulting adopted the name "Accenture". The word "Accenture" was derived from "Accent on the future". The name "Accenture" was submitted by Kim Petersen, a Danish employee from the company's Oslo, Norway office. Petersen hoped that the name would not be offensive in any country in which Accenture operates, because the word itself was meaningless.

=== Incorporation and public listing, 2001–2009 ===
Accenture was incorporated in Bermuda in 2001. On 19 July 2001, Accenture's initial public offering (IPO) was priced at $14.50 per share, and the shares began trading on the New York Stock Exchange. Because of the split from Andersen, Accenture avoided prosecution on June 16, 2002, when the U.S. Securities and Exchange Commission prosecuted Arthur Andersen for obstructing justice and accounting fraud in the supreme court case Arthur Andersen LLP v. United States around the Enron scandal.

=== Reincorporation in Ireland, 2009 until present ===
On 26 May 2009, Accenture announced that its board of directors had unanimously approved changing the company's place of incorporation from Bermuda to Ireland.

Since 2013, Accenture has acquired over 200 companies.

Accenture has been a strategic partner of The Alan Turing Institute since 2017.

In 2025, the company's artificial intelligence acquisitions included Halfspace (Denmark), NeuraFlash (US), and Decho (UK). In January 2026, the company announced the acquisition of Faculty, a UK-based artificial intelligence company, in a deal that values the company at $1 billion.

In March 2026, Accenture agreed to acquire Ookla, a Seattle-based network intelligence company known for Speedtest, Downdetector, Ekahau, and RootMetrics from Ziff Davis for $1.2 billion.

== Services and operations ==
Accenture's business is organised into five segments:

1. Strategy and Consulting
2. Technology
3. Operations
4. Accenture Song (formerly Interactive)
5. Industry X

It is listed in the 211th place in Fortune Global 500 as of January 2026.

== Corporate affairs ==
=== Leadership ===
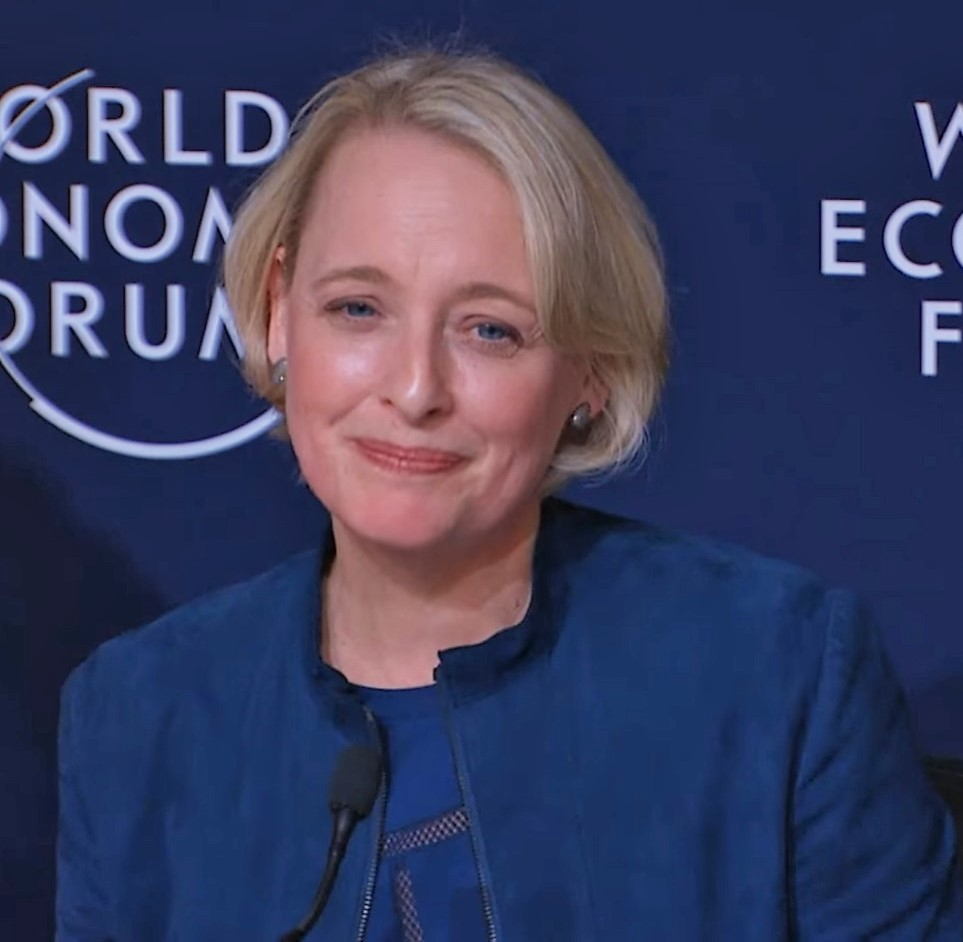
CEO Sweet in 2019.

- Joe Forehand (1999–2004)
- William D. Green (2004–2011)
- Pierre Nanterme (2011–2019)
- David Rowland (2019, interim CEO)
- Julie Sweet (2019–present)

=== Employees ===
As of 2026, Accenture reported having approximately 814,000 employees. In September 2025, the company announced plans on lay off employees who can not be trained on artificial intelligence skills.

=== Finances ===
The financial results were as follows:

Year	Revenue (billion US$)	Net income (billion US$)	Total assets (billion US$)	Employees	Ref.
2013	30.394	3.282	16.867	275,000	
2014	31.875	2.941	17.930	305,000	
2015	32.914	3.054	18.203	358,000	
2016	34.798	4.112	20.609	384,000	
2017	36.765	3.445	22.690	425,000	
2018	41.603	4.060	24.449	459,000	
2019	43.215	4.779	29.789	505,000	
2020	44.327	5.107	37.078	506,000	
2021	50.533	5.906	43.175	624,000	
2022	61.594	6.989	47.263	721,000	
2023	64.111	7.003	51.245	733,000	
2024	64.896	7.419	55.932	774,000	
2025	69.673	7.832	65.394	779,000	
2026	74.183	8.523	73.598	814,000	

Accenture, which went public in 2001, generated total returns (including dividends) of approximately 370% between 2015 and 2024, more than the S&P 500 index itself, Goldman Sachs, etc.

== Controversies ==
=== Rotterdam welfare risk score system ===
In 2017, Accenture developed for Rotterdam a risk score system for the 30,000 inhabitant benefiting from welfare. In 2023, Wired and Lighthouse Reports reported that the algorithm was discriminating based on ethnicity and gender, and found "fundamental flaws that made the system both inaccurate and unfair", concluding that "it performs little better than random selection", while ingesting 315 data points like the length of the last romantic relationship, gender and age.

=== Incorporation in a tax haven ===
In October 2002, the Congressional General Accounting Office (GAO) identified Accenture as one of four publicly traded federal contractors that were incorporated in a tax haven. The other three, unlike Accenture, were incorporated in the United States before they re-incorporated in a tax haven, thereby lowering their US taxes. Critics such as former CNN journalist Lou Dobbs, reported Accenture's decision to incorporate in Bermuda was a US tax avoidance ploy, because they viewed Accenture as having been a US-based company. The GAO itself did not characterise Accenture as having been a US-based company; it stated that "prior to incorporating in Bermuda, Accenture was operating as a series of related partnerships and corporations under the control of its partners through the mechanism of contracts with a Swiss coordinating entity."

In 2009 Accenture shifted its incorporation to Ireland.

=== UK NHS contracts ===
Accenture engaged in an IT overhaul project for the British National Health Service (NHS) in 2003, making headlines when it withdrew from the contract in 2006 over disputes related to delays and cost overruns. The government of the United Kingdom ultimately abandoned the project five years later for the same reasons.

In 2018-2019, NHS Digital awarded multiple contracts for a total a £33 millions to Accenture, 15% of its total operating budget of £218 millions, as well as 20% in 2019-2020, despite two members of the NHS Digital board being previously employed by the company and still holding shares at the time. Matthew Swindells, Deputy Chief Executive of the NHS until 2019 was hired by Accenture immediately after his resignation.

=== False Claims Act Allegations ===
In September 2011, Accenture agreed to pay the United States $63.675 millions to resolve allegations brought to light by two whistleblowers that it "received kickbacks for its recommendations of hardware and software to the government, fraudulently inflated prices and rigged bids in connection with federal information technology contracts".

=== US immigration ===
In June 2018, Accenture was asked to recruit 7,500 U.S. Customs and Border Protection officers. Under the $297 million contract, Accenture had been charging the US Government nearly $40,000 per hire, which was more than the annual salary of the average officer. According to a report published by the DHS Office of Inspector General in December 2018, Accenture had been paid $13.6M through the first ten months of the contract. They had hired two agents against a contract goal of 7,500 hires over five years. The report was issued as a 'management alert', indicating an issue requiring immediate attention, stating that "Accenture has already taken longer to deploy and delivered less capability than promised". The contract was terminated in 2019.

=== Working conditions ===
In February 2019, contractors from Accenture's Austin, Texas, location who performed content moderation tasks for Facebook wrote an open letter to Facebook describing poor working conditions and a "Big Brother environment" that included restricted work breaks and strict non-disclosure agreements. A counselor in the Austin office stated that the content moderators could develop post-traumatic stress disorder as a result of the work, which included evaluating videos and images containing graphic violence, hate speech, animal abuse, and child abuse. Accenture issued a statement saying the company offers opportunities for moderators to advance, increase their wages, and provide input "to help shape their experience".

In February 2025, Vice News spoke to a former Accenture employee under the condition of anonymity. His project on the WhatsApp team for Meta required him to sift through images and decide whether or not they depicted child sexual abuse, which he coped with "through a lot of substance abuse". The former employee claimed to have witnessed multiple missed opportunities to protect children, and alleged that one colleague had previously been arrested for possessing child abuse materials. In a statement, Accenture said they are "committed to helping companies keep their platforms safe through services such as content, advertising, and compliance reviews".

=== Tax practices ===
In the UK, in 2009, 2010 and 2011, Accenture UK, a key provider of IT services for Britain's HMRC, was reported to have respectively paid 2%, 4.3% and 3.5% in corporation taxes.

In February 2019, Accenture paid $200 million to Swiss authorities over tax claims related to transfer pricing arrangements.

=== Data breach ===
In August 2021, Accenture confirmed a data breach resulting from a ransomware attack, which reportedly led to the theft of approximately six terabytes of data.

In September 2026, Accenture reportedly failed to implement a security patch that led to the breach of multiple FBI-related services by the criminal hacker group ShinyHunters.

=== Employment practices ===
In March 2023, Accenture announced plans to eliminate 19,000 jobs of the 738,000 employees over 18 months, citing reduced revenue forecasts.

In February 2025, Accenture made significant changes to its diversity, equity, and inclusion policies, including the discontinuation of global employee representation goals and specific demographic-focused career development programs. The company also paused participation in external diversity benchmarking surveys and reevaluated their external partnerships. According to media analysis, this was to comply with President Donald Trump's Executive Order 14151 to avoid losing billions of dollars of work with US federal agencies.

== See also ==
- List of acquisitions by Accenture
