= Pierre Nanterme =

French business executive (1959–2019)

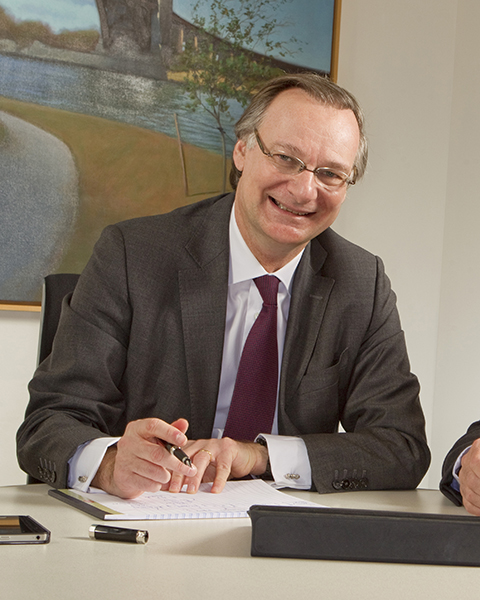
- Pierre Nanterme in 2012
- Born: 7 September 1959; Lyon, France
- Died: 31 January 2019 (aged 59); Paris, France
- Education: ESSEC Business School
- Known for: Chairman & CEO of Accenture (2011-2019)
- Children: 1

Pierre Nanterme (7 September 1959 – 31 January 2019) was a French business executive. He was the chairman and chief executive officer (CEO) of Accenture, a global management consulting and professional services firm.

== Early life ==
Nanterme was born in France in 1959. He attended the ESSEC Business School (École Supérieure des Sciences Économiques et Commerciales) in Paris and received a master's in management degree in 1981. After graduation, he completed his military service in France.

== Career at Accenture ==
In 1983, Nanterme began his career at the consulting firm Accenture (then known as Andersen Consulting). Roles during his early career at the company included acting as head of the banking and finance practice in France. He became a partner at the firm in 1993. Between 1993 and 2005, Nanterme held a number of positions in the firm's financial services practice, including managing director for Europe, Africa, and Latin America, as well as global managing director of the insurance industry group.

In November 2005, Nanterme was appointed the national managing director for Accenture in France. The next year, he joined Accenture's global leadership team and became the company's chief leadership officer, managing its leadership development.

In 2007, Nanterme was appointed group chief executive of Accenture's global financial services operating group, which focuses on clients in banking, insurance, and capital markets. In October 2010, the company announced that Nanterme would serve as the next chief executive officer of Accenture, at which time he also became a member of the board of directors. He officially took office as CEO on 1 January 2011, and in February 2013 took on the additional role of chairman.

On 11 January 2019, Nanterme resigned as chairman and CEO, citing health concerns. He worked in Accenture for 36 years.

== Other activities ==
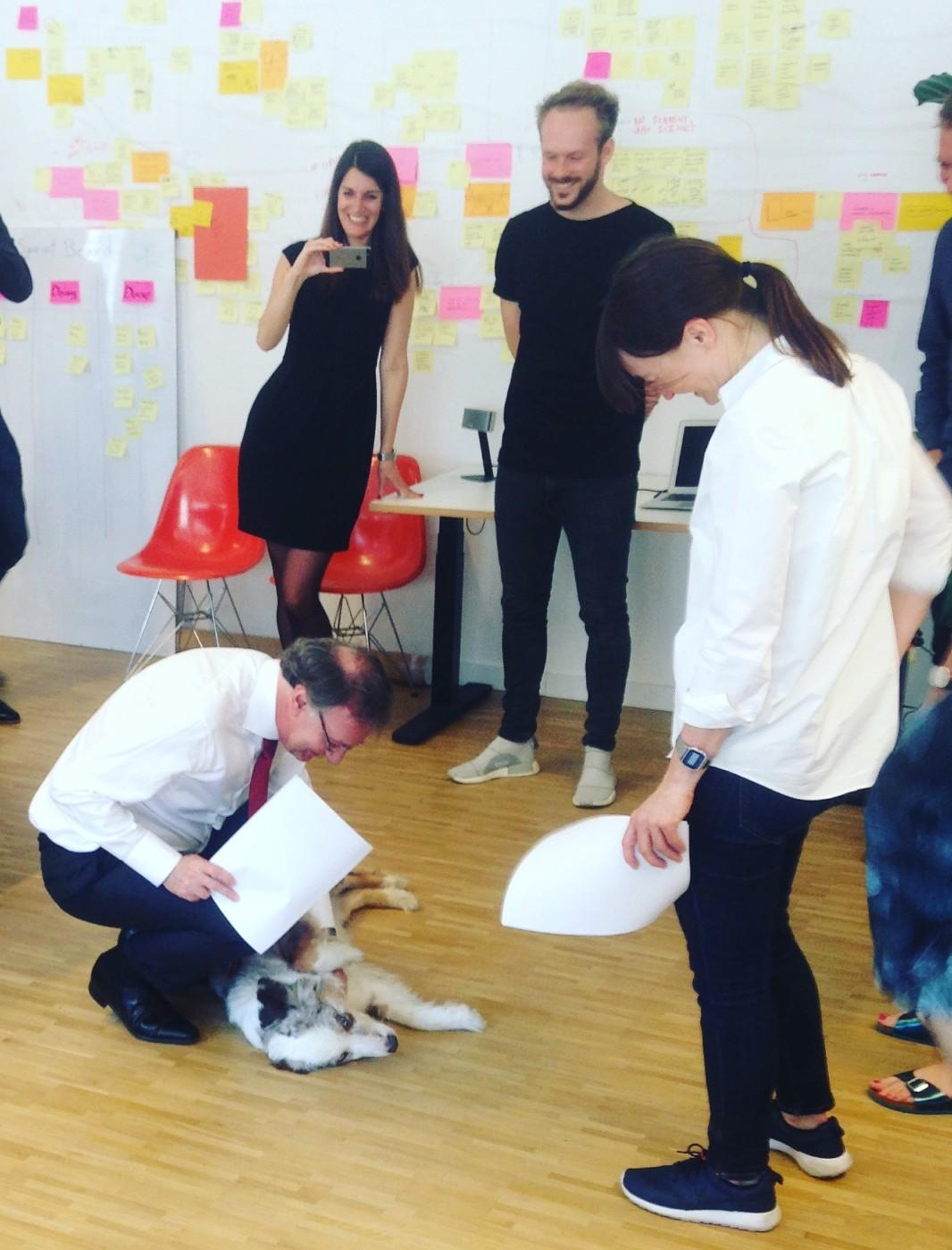
Pierre Nanterme in Berlin at Fjord with the studio dog ‘Gravity’

Nanterme was involved with the Mouvement des Entreprises de France (MEDEF), the largest French employers' association, and served as president of the association's Commission for Economic Affairs and Public Finance from 2005 to 2013. He also served on MEDEF's executive board.

Between 2007 and 2011, Nanterme was chairman of the French consulting association SYNTEC, which has member companies from the engineering, information technology, research, and consulting sectors.

Nanterme served on a number of task forces for the B20 Summit, and was a member of the executive board of the B20 Green Growth Action Alliance, which was launched by the World Economic Forum to work on the growing need for private funding in sustainability. He also co-chaired the Alliance's Energy Efficiency working group and served as a member of the Economic Policy working group.

In addition to the above roles, Nanterme served on the steering board of the European Commission's European Cloud Partnership, which aims to encourage the public sector to use cloud computing services to create economic growth in Europe. He also acted as a board member of the TransAtlantic Business Dialogue, a group of CEOs who form policies to encourage trade between Europe and America.

== Recognition ==
In 2010, Nanterme was awarded the insignia Chevalier of the Legion of Honour for his work as a French business leader.

On 11 February 2014, Nanterme was among the guests invited to the state dinner hosted by U.S. President Barack Obama in honour of President François Hollande at the White House.

== Health concerns and death ==
Nanterme was diagnosed with colorectal cancer in 2016. Twenty days after stepping down as CEO, on 31 January 2019, Nanterme died in Paris at the age of 59.
