= TalentSprint =

Indian educational technology company

Talentsprint

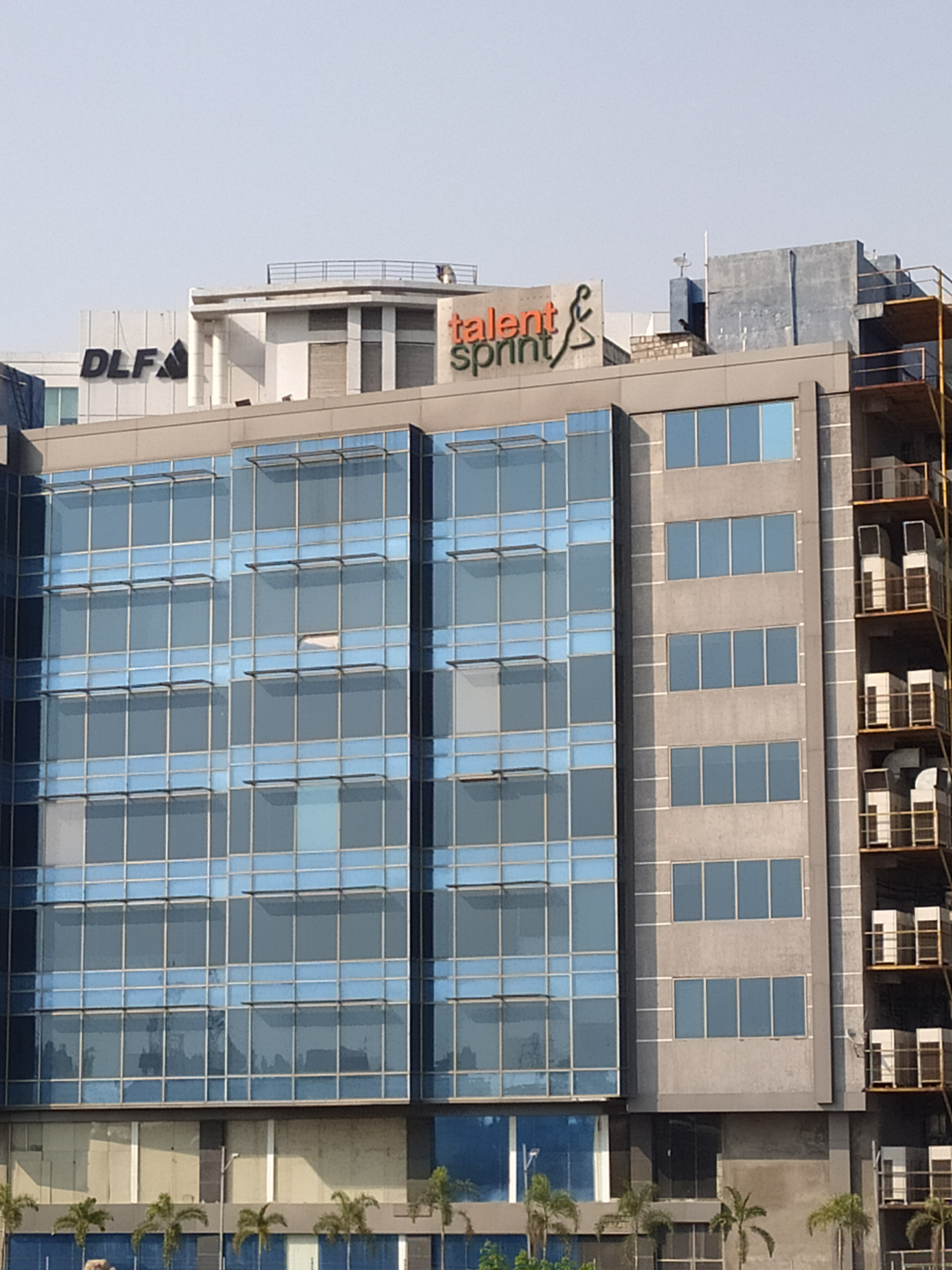
- Formation: 2009
- Founders: Santanu Paul, Madhumurty Ronanki and J. A. Chowdary
- Legal status: Operational
- Headquarters: Gachibowli, Hyderabad
- Location: National
- Region served: India
- CTO: Jitendra Singh
- Website: https://talentsprint.com/

TalentSprint is a National Stock Exchange (NSE) Group Company, an EdTech Firm headquartered in Hyderabad, India. Its coding boot camps, executive programs, and hybrid digital learning platform use onsite and online learning experiences. TalentSprint partners with academic institutions and corporations to develop and deliver certificate programs in Artificial Intelligence & Machine Learning, Blockchain, FinTech, and Emerging Tech.

== History ==
TalentSprint was started by Santanu Paul, Madhumurty Ronanki and J. A. Chowdary in 2009. Initially, TalentSprint focused on coding boot camps for young graduates starting careers in the IT industry. Next, it added online job prep programs for banking career aspirants.

TalentSprint started with an initial capital of Rs.2 crore. In 2011, the EdTech firm partnered with the National Skill Development Corporation or NSDC that picked about four percent stake in TalentSprint and raised a debt of Rs.10 crore. In 2012, it raised Rs. 20 crore in series-A equity funding from Nexus Venture Partners (leading India-US Venture Fund).

In April 2025, Accenture agreed to acquire TalentSprint.

== Partner Institutions ==
TalentSprint partners with academic institutions and companies to design, develop, and deliver deep tech certification programs. As of June 2019, the partners include IIIT Hyderabad, IIT Hyderabad, IIM Calcutta, Pegasystems and Google.
