= FamilyPC =

American computer magazine, 1994 to 2001

- June 1995 cover
- Editor: Robin Raskin
- Categories: Computer magazine
- Frequency: Monthly
- Circulation: 400,000
- Publisher: The Disney Publishing Group, Ziff-Davis
- First issue: 1994
- Final issue: 2002
- Country: United States
- Language: English

FamilyPC was a monthly American computer magazine published from 1994 to 2001. The collaboration between The Disney Publishing Group and Ziff-Davis was a brainchild of Jake Winebaum, with Robin Raskin serving as its first editor-in-chief. The circulation of the magazine was 400,000 copies in 1998.

The magazine itself covered a wide varieties of topics that applied to families. In software, it tended to cover education software, further going into Edutainment software, applications, and creativity tools. An Australian version, Family PC Australia, was published by APN Computing under the license of Ziff Communications and the Walt Disney Company. The magazine was started in August/September 1995 and was published on a bimonthly basis.

Ziff-Davis shut down the magazine in 2002. When FamilyPC was discontinued, Ziff-Davis switched FamilyPC subscribers to PC Magazine.
