= Spiceworks News & Insights =

- Type: Subsidiary
- Industry: IT media
- Founded: Scottsdale, AZ (1998)
- Headquarters: Austin, Texas, US
- Website: www.spiceworks.com

Spiceworks News & Insights is an online community that enables peers to share professional knowledge about information technology. Since 1998, Toolbox has helped professionals make IT decisions and stay current in the rapidly changing technology market through peer collaboration.

In 2007, Toolbox was acquired by Corporate Executive Board for $59 million. In 2012, Toolbox, which had since been renamed Toolbox.com, was acquired by Ziff Davis for an undisclosed amount. In 2022 Toolbox merged with Spiceworks and is currently operating as Spiceworks News and Insights.

== History ==
The company was founded in 1998 as "Toolbox," one of the first online communities enabling professionals to share knowledge about information technology. About the inception of ITtoolbox, co-founder Dan Morrison was quoted saying the concept occurred to him while working for a large project management firm that boasted an internal knowledge-sharing database:

"The idea hit me immediately...It seemed very logical to allow people to access the collective knowledge of the entire workforce so that they could be better at their jobs. I thought to myself, 'Imagine if this could be deployed on the Internet'.”

Toolbox was built on five knowledge bases - SAP, Oracle, PeopleSoft, Baan, and ERP - powered by discussion forums. The Toolbox platform now incorporates a professional network, 28 knowledge bases, more than 200 blogs, 650 discussion groups, and a wiki to facilitate targeted community interaction in which IT advertisers can participate through a proprietary contextual matching system.

In February 2000, Toolbox launched Toolbox Groups, e-mail-based discussion communities covering a range of IT products and topics. Regarding the launch, Morrison explained that at the time “many people (had) not yet realized the significant benefits the collaborative nature of the Internet” could bring to professionals, and that by integrating the Toolbox offering with email, an ordinary part of every professional's toolset, more would be exposed to these benefits.

In May 2003, ITtoolbox introduced the ITtoolbox Blogs program, bringing together a network of blog authors to publish professional content based on their firsthand knowledge.

In July 2005, ITtoolbox unveiled ITtoolbox Wiki, offering a collaborative IT reference guide created and edited by the community.

In September 2006, ITtoolbox launched ITtoolbox Professional Networking, allowing users to create home pages representing them, find and connect with similar experts, and share IT knowledge.

In January 2007, information industry analyst EPS/Outsell named ITtoolbox, YouTube, Facebook, and Zillow among 20 companies to shake up the information and publishing industries.

In February 2007, Morrison, along with Reid Hoffman, CEO of LinkedIn, Jim Fowler, CEO of Jigsaw, and Paul Pellman, President of Hoover’s were invited by the Software and Information Industry Association to speak to information industry executives about the merits of user-generated content vs. traditional content. In explaining the premise that guided ITtoolbox to get 740 advertising customers “paying up to $120 CPM” in a user-generated content model, Morrison said “We believe community-powered models will lead certain segments of business information.” He provided a two-point litmus test ITtoolbox used to identify markets susceptible to this change. First, how will media consumption be distributed between user-generated content versus traditional content for a given market? Second, how will ad performance compare? Morrison posited ITtoolbox’s efforts since 1998 were showing user-generated content models were capable of leading certain segments of business information under this litmus test.

In July 2007, ITtoolbox was acquired by Corporate Executive Board for $59 million.

In October 2008, the online community at ITtoolbox was renamed to "Toolbox for IT". The new name for the company that operates this online community was established at this time: Toolbox.com.

In January 2012, Toolbox.com was acquired by Ziff Davis.

In December 2017, Ziff Davis started to roll out-migration to a new world, quote "[sic] The way groups work on the new Toolbox platform is more like LinkedIn groups, [sic] but it’ll be more of a social space of like-minded IT professionals.". The email newsgroup-style feed, which was the main input channel disappeared along with the majority of the associated messages.

2022 - Toolbox merged with Spiceworks and is currently operating by the name of Spiceworks News and Insights.

== Products ==
The ITtoolbox platform integrates the following collaboration and community publishing tools:

- Groups: More than 650 discussion communities allow peers to ask and answer questions among each other.
- Blogs: A community publishing service where professionals post IT news and knowledge and community members comment on the entries.
- Wiki: An IT reference guide and instruction manual created by the community, including definitions, source code samples, FAQs, and HOWTOs.
- Knowledge Bases: Websites that allow members of the IT community to interact with peers through the tools listed above based on topics of interest. They also contain content from third parties including vendor white papers, media news, job postings, and more. There are 28 Knowledge Bases: Business Intelligence, CIO, CRM, Data Warehouse, Java, Windows, PeopleSoft, Oracle, SAP, Baan, ERP, Linux, UNIX, Networking, Security, Web Design, SCM, Siebel, Database, EAI, Visual Basic, C Languages, Wireless, Storage, Hardware, Emerging Technologies, Project Management, and Knowledge Management.
- Professional Networking: Tools that allow professionals to create their own home pages, connect with other professionals, and communicate with the IT community.
