= Focus.com =

Business social networking platform

- Type: Private
- Industry: Research, Social Network
- Founded: 2005
- Headquarters: San Francisco, California
- Products: Research, Social Network
- Website: focus.com (archived in May 2011)

Focus.com was a business focused social networking platform and source of technology expertise. Focus members could freely access expert research in diverse areas such as Information Technology, Sales, Marketing, Operations, Small Business, and Human Resources. Members also could get their business questions answered by experts in the community in the site's Q & A and Virtual Summit sections.

The company was founded in August 2005 by Scott Albro and was headquartered in San Francisco, California.

The company was purchased by Ziff Davis, Inc. in August 2011 and its location at Focus.com has since been terminated.

== See also ==
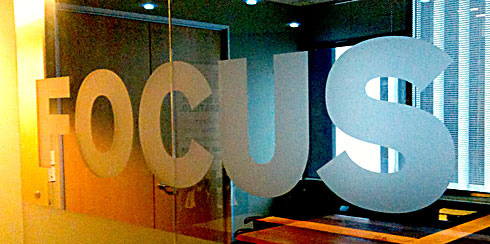
Focus conference room

- LinkedIn Answers
- Quora
- Toolbox.com
