= DailyOM =

Online publication & education platform

- Founded: 2004
- Founders: Madisyn Taylor, Scott Blum
- Industry: Education, health
- Parent: Everyday Health Group
- Website: www.dailyom.com

DailyOM is an American online publication and education platform focused on health, spirituality, and other topics. It was founded by writer Madisyn Taylor and multimedia artist Scott Blum in 2004 and is based in Santa Barbara, California.

== History ==
Before founding DailyOM, Taylor owned an aromatherapy product company. Blum had worked as a software developer for Capcom, Sega, Taito, and Starwave. He was also one of the producers of the multimedia project Peter Gabriel: Eve. He established iMusic before its eventual sale to Apple.

In 2008, DailyOM published Madisyn Taylor's first book, DailyOM: Inspirational Thoughts for a Happy, Healthy, and Fulfilling Day.

Taylor also wrote the 2011 book DailyOM: Learning to Live. Taylor's writings from the book have also been featured on Oprah Winfrey's website.

Taylor also produced and recorded the meditation album Meditation for the Highly Sensitive Person, which was released under the DailyOM label in 2015. The album reached #1 on Billboard's New Age Albums chart. Taylor was also interviewed for the 2015 documentary film Sensitive: The Untold Story, which was based on Elaine Aron's research. She went on to publish the book Unmedicated: The Four Pillars of Natural Wellness in 2018.

DailyOM currently operates under the digital media group Everyday Health Group, which was acquired by Ziff Davis in 2016.

== Services ==
DailyOM's course topics include self-improvement, spirituality, and fitness. DailyOM hosts courses from authors such as Deepak Chopra, Sadie Nardini, Eric Maisel, Edward Vilga,Debbie Ford, Sarah Louise Rector, Dan Millman, and Andrew Harvey. Full courses are priced on a sliding scale.

DailyOM also has an "Inspirations" section which publishes articles on spiritual and mental health.
