= Microsystems =

Microsystems may refer to:

- Microelectromechanical systems, miniature electronic and mechanical systems less than a millimeter in size
- Microsystems (magazine), a personal computing magazine of the early 1980s
