= Verizon (wireless service) =

American telecommunications company

Cellco Partnership
- Trade name: Verizon
- Type: Subsidiary
- Industry: Telecommunications
- Predecessors: Bell Atlantic Mobile; AirTouch; PrimeCo; GTE Wireless
- Founded: April 4, 2000; 26 years ago in Bedminster, New Jersey, U.S.
- Founders: Verizon Communications; Vodafone
- Headquarters: One Verizon Way, Basking Ridge, New Jersey, U.S.
- Number of locations: 2,330 owned retail stores
- Area served: United States
- Key people: Dan Schulman (CEO, Verizon Communications)
- Services: Mobile telephony; Wireless broadband
- Parent: Verizon Communications
- Divisions: Verizon Consumer; Verizon Business
- Website: verizon.com

Cellco Partnership, doing business as Verizon and formerly Verizon Wireless, is an American wireless network operator. Verizon is the largest wireless carrier in the United States, with 146.8 million subscribers as of March 31, 2026. It has the largest network in the United States with their LTE network covering 2.68 million sq. miles of the United States.

The company is headquartered in Basking Ridge, New Jersey. It was founded on April 4, 2000 as a joint venture of American telecommunications firm Bell Atlantic Corporation, which would soon become Verizon Communications, and British multinational telecommunications company Vodafone. Verizon Communications became the sole owner in 2014 after buying Vodafone's 45-percent stake in the company. In a 2019 reorganization, Verizon moved the wireless products and services into the divisions Verizon Consumer and Verizon Business, and stopped using the Verizon Wireless name.

It operates national 5G and 4G LTE networks covering about 99 percent of the U.S. population, which in the first half of 2024 won top honors in five out of eight categories of the RootMetrics RootScore Reports, along with the most awards in both state and metro testing. Notably, Verizon won the United States Overall and Data RootScore Awards outright, along with outright wins for accessibility and video performance. Verizon Wireless offers mobile phone services through a variety of devices. Its LTE in Rural America Program, with 21 rural wireless carriers participating, covers 2.7 million potential users in 169 rural counties. Verizon Wireless announced in 2015 that it was developing a 5G, or fifth-generation, network. In 2020, 230 million people were able to access Verizon's 5G, or fifth-generation, dynamic spectrum sharing (DSS) technology network; by 2024, 250 million people were covered by Verizon's 5G Ultra Wideband network.

== History ==
Original logo, used from April 4, 2000, to September 1, 2015

In September 1999, American phone company Bell Atlantic and British-based Vodafone Airtouch PLC proposed they would create a new wireless phone service joint venture valued at $70 billion. The joint venture was being created as Bell Atlantic underwent a merger with GTE Corporation. In April 2000, the companies announced that the Bell Atlantic–GTE merger would take the name Verizon and that the Bell Atlantic–Vodafone wireless unit would be called Verizon Wireless (legally Cellco Partnership d.b.a. Verizon Wireless). Verizon Communications owned 55 percent of Verizon Wireless while Vodafone retained 45 percent ownership. Regulators with the Federal Communications Commission approved the Bell Atlantic–GTE merger on June 16, 2000, creating the largest wireless company in the United States. Verizon Wireless held this market position until Cingular Wireless acquired AT&T Wireless Services in 2004.

Throughout the 2000s, Verizon acquired several wireless phone companies and assets across the country, including West Virginia Wireless in 2006; Ramcell in 2007; Rural Cellular Corporation and SureWest Communications, both in 2008. Also in 2008, Verizon struck a deal to buy Alltel for $5.9 billion in equity while assuming $22.2 billion worth of debt. The deal was finalized on January 9, 2009, again making Verizon Wireless the country's largest cellphone network. As per the agreement, Verizon sold rural wireless properties across 18 states to AT&T. Those properties were in Alabama, Arizona, California, Colorado, Iowa, Kansas, Michigan, Minnesota, Montana, Nebraska, Nevada, New Mexico, North Dakota, South Dakota, Tennessee, Utah, Virginia and Wyoming. Verizon's acquisitions continued in the 2010s, including the purchases of some Plateau Wireless markets in 2012 and Golden State Cellular's operator in 2014.

Majority owner Verizon Communications became sole owner of its wireless business in 2014, when it bought Vodafone's 45 percent stake. Vodafone received $58.9 billion cash, $60.2 billion in stock and $11 billion in other consideration. An article in The New York Times estimated Verizon Wireless' valuation at about $290 billion.

In late 2014, it became known that Verizon Wireless uses deep packet inspection for server-side insertion of a customer-unique ID field ("X-UIDH") into all unencrypted HTTP headers. The mechanism has been referred to as a "supercookie" or "perma-cookie", although it is technically not a cookie in that it does not store information on the customers device and is transparent to the user. It cannot be averted with common mechanisms like ad-blockers; however it cannot be inserted into encrypted HTTPS and VPN connections. Verizon advertises the system to marketing partners. The Electronic Frontier Foundation has called on Verizon to terminate the program, calling it a "profound violation of trust", expressing concern over abuse by third parties, and questioning the legality of Verizon modifying their users' outgoing data without offering them the possibility of a full opt-out. In January 2015, Verizon announced they would give customers the option of opting out, and since April 1, 2015, Verizon has allowed customers to opt-out, either online or by calling a special phone number.

In August 2016, Verizon hired Ronan Dunne, the former head of British provider O2, as the new president of its wireless business.

In September 2016, Comcast confirmed that it planned to launch a mobile service, using Verizon's network as an MVNO, in mid-2017.

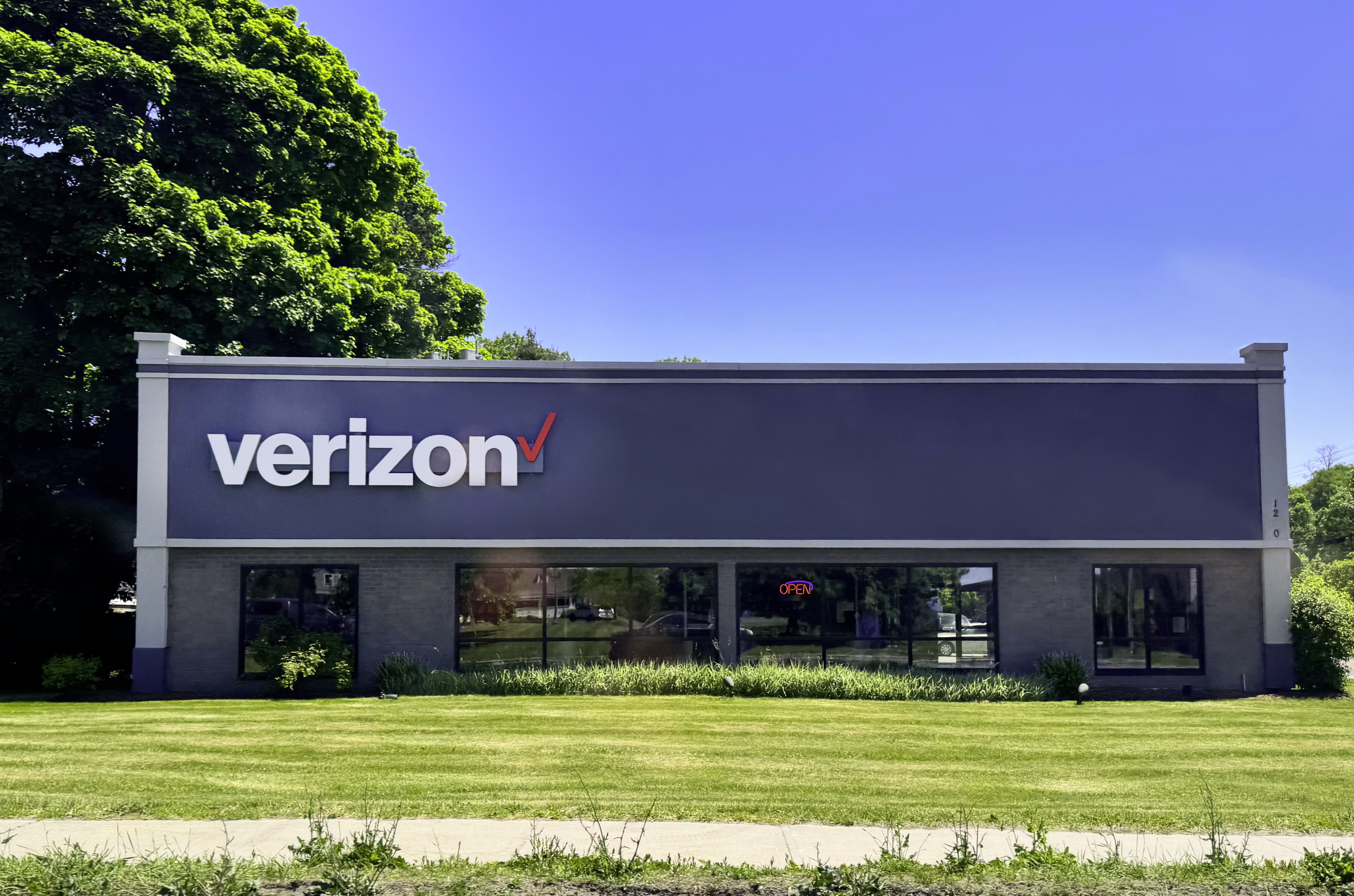
A Verizon Wireless retail store in Burlington, Vermont

In February 2017, in the wake of competition from Sprint and T-Mobile, and initiatives to expand the capacity and improve the quality of its network by using macrocells and supporting carrier aggregation, Verizon announced that it would bring back an "unlimited" data plan (subject to throttling in heavy network areas after 22 GB of usage). Verizon's decision not to restrict the bitrate of video services prompted Sprint and T-Mobile to remove similar restrictions from their own plans.

In March 2017, Verizon announced that all their Android phones will have AppFlash, to help users find content and services across different apps. Critics spoke harshly against it.

In May 2018, former Verizon executive Miguel Quiroga launched the pre-paid carrier Visible in Denver Colorado, which Verizon funds and owns.

On June 8, 2018, Verizon announced that Hans Vestberg had been chosen to become CEO on August 1, 2018.

In August 2018, the fire department of Santa Clara County, California, filed evidence in a lawsuit seeking the reinstatement of net neutrality policies, which accused Verizon of throttling an "unlimited" wireless data plan associated with a vehicle that was being used to coordinate responses to the Mendocino Complex Fire. The department reported that a Verizon Wireless customer service representative insisted that they must upgrade to a higher-cost data plan in order to restore their internet speed. In a statement, Verizon acknowledged that they did not properly explain the terms of the contract, and that the representative did not adhere to a company policy of removing these restrictions during emergency situations.

In 2019, Verizon Wireless services were split between two new divisions: Verizon Consumer and Verizon Business. The name "Wireless" was extinguished, rebranding the mobile network as simply Verizon. Verizon still often abbreviates their name to "VZW", with the W standing for Wireless.

In 2020 Verizon launched a prepaid mobile phone service named Yahoo! Mobile after acquiring a 10% interest in Yahoo!. The service was shut down on August 31, 2021, in favor of Visible.

On November 23, 2021, Verizon purchased TracFone Wireless which was worth an approximately $6.25 billion.

== Network ==
Verizon Wireless operates 5G and 4G LTE networks. As of January 2020, Verizon claims that 99% of the population of the United States can access their 4G network. However, OpenSignal's crowdsourced data showed 4G coverage of 95.9%.

Before Verizon's LTE network was launched, the company operated an exclusively CDMA2000 network (the other major CDMA2000 carrier in the US being Sprint). Verizon began its initial tests for the 4G LTE network in 2008 in order to move from older-generation mobile communications technologies to the emerging global standard. In December 2010, Verizon Wireless launched a fledgling 4G LTE network in 39 markets. By December 2011, only a year after launch, 200 million Americans were covered with 4G LTE, in 190 markets. As of 2016, 98% of the U.S. was covered with LTE, and 92% of all data traffic was on LTE.

In 2012, the service provider bought spectrum from the country's biggest cable companies, including Comcast, and Spectrum (Time Warner Cable and Bright House Networks at the time) to improve its data network across the U.S. The new capacity allowed Verizon to launch what it calls XLTE (LTE on Band 4) in 2013, providing more capacity in congested and well-populated markets.

Because 4G LTE is a data-transmitting network, when it launched, Verizon customers' voice calls were still carried over the company's CDMA2000 network, which was developed for 3G cellphones. In September 2014, Verizon launched voice over LTE (VoLTE); this allowed voice calls to transmit via the data-only LTE network. This also allows for simultaneous voice and data services, something that is unavailable on traditional CDMA2000 calls. Along with VoLTE, Verizon also announced support for HD Voice, which provides higher-quality audio for VoLTE calls, and native Video Calling for Android phones. In March 2016, Verizon enabled support for Wi-Fi Calling, which allows calls to be placed over a Wi-Fi network. As of August 2015, nearly 4 million of Verizon's 103.7 million subscribers used VoLTE. In 2019, Verizon announced that they plan to shut down their CDMA2000 network by the end of 2020, making VoLTE the only way to make calls on their network.

In September 2015, Verizon's chief information and technology architect Roger Gurnani stated that Verizon was planning to trial a 5G wireless network within 12 months, with "some level of commercial deployment" by 2017. In late August 2016, Verizon officially announced that it had rolled out LTE Advanced services in 461 markets. The company promoted that the technology would allow at least 50% higher LTE data speeds on supported devices.

By the end of 2019, Verizon had launched 5G service in 30 cities across the U.S. Verizon's 5G network is deployed on millimeter wave spectrum (mmWave). While fast, the high-band spectrum Verizon uses has limited range and high penetration loss.

In October 2020, during a virtual event unveiling the iPhone 12, Verizon announced that it had begun to widely deploy 5G service on sub-6 GHz spectrum, branded as "Nationwide 5G". This service has a wider range than its mmWave 5G (henceforth branded by Verizon as "5G Ultra Wideband") services, and is available to most existing Verizon subscribers with a supported device (unlike mmWave service, which requires one of the service's newer unlimited plans), but uses "dynamic spectrum sharing" with LTE service, and does not have the same level of speed as mmWave. As of December 2020, more than 200 million people were able to access Verizon’s 5G network through Verizon’s DSS-enabled service. As of April 2023, Verizon reached 200 million people covered for its Verizon's 5G Ultra Wideband.

Verizon intended to retire its 2G and 3G CDMA network in favor of LTE and 5G on January 1, 2021, but made a last-minute decision to "indefinitely" halt the retirement. They later confirmed that the CDMA network will be retired on December 31, 2022. Verizon customers using a CDMA-only device, or an LTE device that does not support Voice over LTE, were required to upgrade to a newer device in order to continue using the network. The shutdown was completed at the end of 2022 as planned.

A report by RootMetrics on carrier performance in the first half of 2024 ranked Verizon's network as the best in overall national performance, network accessibility, data performance, video performance, and tied for best text performance.

=== Radio frequency summary ===
The following is a list of 4G LTE and 5G NR frequency bands which Verizon employs in the United States. Verizon's CDMA network was shut down on December 31, 2022.

Frequency bands used on the Verizon Network
Frequency Band	Band Number	Protocol	Generation	Status	Notes
700 MHz Upper SMH C Block	13	LTE/LTE-A/ LTE-A Pro	4G	Active/built out	Primary LTE band, launched in December 2010. Spectrum covers 100% of the continental United States.
850 MHz CLR	5	LTE/LTE-A/ LTE-A Pro	4G	Active/refarming to NR	Additional low-band LTE capacity, has been replaced by 5G NR using the same spectrum in some markets.
1.7/2.1 GHz AWS	4/66	LTE/LTE-A/ LTE-A Pro	4G	Active/refarming to NR	Branded as "XLTE" at launch, this second layer of LTE coverage is used to increase bandwidth in major markets.
1.9 GHz PCS	2	LTE/LTE-A/ LTE-A Pro	4G	Active/refarming to NR	Third layer of LTE coverage, used to relieve congestion.
3.5 GHz CBRS	48	LTE/LTE-A/ LTE-A Pro	4G	Active/building out	Additional capacity in select areas.
5.2 GHz U-NII	46	LTE/LTE-A/ LTE-A Pro	4G	Active/building out	Additional capacity in select areas.
850 MHz CLR	n5	NR/5G-A	5G	Active/building out	Branded as "5G Nationwide", these are the primary bands for 5G NR network. Spectrum is shared with LTE using DSS, but as 5G device adoption increases it is becoming dedicated to 5G NR in select markets. Originally launched October 2020.
1.7/2.1 GHz AWS	n66	NR/5G-A	5G	Active/building out	Branded as "5G Nationwide", these are the primary bands for 5G NR network. Spectrum is shared with LTE using DSS, but as 5G device adoption increases it is becoming dedicated to 5G NR in select markets. Originally launched October 2020.
1.9 GHz PCS	n2	NR/5G-A	5G	Active/building out	Branded as "5G Nationwide", these are the primary bands for 5G NR network. Spectrum is shared with LTE using DSS, but as 5G device adoption increases it is becoming dedicated to 5G NR in select markets. Originally launched October 2020.
3.7 GHz C-Band	n77	NR/5G-A	5G	Active/building out	Branded as "5G Ultra Wideband", launched on January 19, 2022.
28 GHz Ka-Band	n261	NR/5G-A	5G	Active/building out	Branded as "5G Ultra Wideband", these are the mmWave bands, enabling 4 gigabit speeds using small cells. Went live in May 2019.
39 GHz Ka-Band	n260	NR/5G-A	5G	Active/building out	Branded as "5G Ultra Wideband", these are the mmWave bands, enabling 4 gigabit speeds using small cells. Went live in May 2019.

=== Past networks summary ===
The following chart lists the networks that Verizon previously operated.

Frequency Band	Band number	Protocol	Generation	Status	Notes
850 MHz CLR	N/A	AMPS	1G	Retired	Network was shut down on February 18, 2008.
800 MHz CLR	BC0	IS-95/1xRTT/ EVDO/eHRPD	2G/3G	Retired	Network was shut down on December 31, 2022.
1.9 GHz PCS	BC1	IS-95/1xRTT/ EVDO/eHRPD	2G/3G	Retired	Network was shut down on December 31, 2022.

== Apps ==
Verizon Wireless offers certain applications and services that are exclusive to its subscribers. Many of these apps are pre-loaded on Verizon devices—primarily Android smartphones. The company has received criticism for this practice, as users and critics have viewed the applications to be "bloatware" that are sometimes redundant to applications already included with the device's operating system.

The NFL Mobile app allows Verizon Wireless subscribers to stream National Football League games and NFL Network on their devices. While previously a subscription-based service, NFL Mobile was made free to all subscribers beginning in the 2015 NFL season. As part of an exclusivity agreement with the NFL, only Verizon Wireless subscribers could stream NFL telecasts to devices with screens 7 inches (18 cm) or less in size. This contract ended after the 2017 NFL season; Verizon agreed to a new five-year, non-exclusive digital rights agreement, which removes the device class exclusivity, and focuses more upon distributing its streams and other enhanced digital content via its portfolio of internet media brands, rather than being exclusive to Verizon Wireless subscribers.

As part of a deal that also granted the carrier title sponsorship of the series, Verizon subscribers also have access to exclusive streaming content within the official IndyCar Series app.

The My Verizon app is used for account management, including checking usage statistics and managing the user's service plan and account features. Verizon Cloud, which allows photos, videos, contacts, messages and call logs to be synchronized online, was released in April 2013 initially for Android phones, followed the next month by a launch for iOS. Verizon Messages, otherwise known as Message+, is an alternative text messaging app that additionally allows messages to be synchronized between multiple devices. VZ Navigator is a subscription-based maps and navigation service which provides turn-by-turn navigation, crowdsourced traffic data, weather, events and entertainment listings, gas prices, roadside assistance, 2D and 3D views. The Verizon Support & Protection app provides technical support services, lost device location, and on Android, antivirus functionality.

Verizon Family Locator is a subscription-based service and app can be used to track the locations of family members on a map for up to 10 devices. Verizon Family Base allows parents to restrict when and how their children use their phones, view their children's contacts and lock the devices. Verizon also offers the GizmoPal, a wristband-worn phone for children that is restricted to only placing or receiving calls from one of two designated caregivers, and has GPS tracking.

Other Verizon Wireless apps include Field Force Manager, which allows employers to manage employees with GPS, management timesheets and oversee travel, Visual Voice Mail and Roadside Assistance.

== Products and services ==
Verizon Wireless offers mobile phone, home telephone, and Internet services through a variety of devices.

=== Wireless phone services ===
Verizon Wireless offers smartphones powered by Apple's iOS and Google's Android. Both its basic phones and smartphones use their 4G LTE or 5G network. The company offers different voice and data plans for its users.

=== Wireless home phone ===
Introduced in February 2015 as Verizon Wireless Home Phone Connect, Wireless Home Phone uses Verizon's cellular network rather than using traditional landline wires to provide home phone service.

=== Mobile broadband and Wi-Fi ===
Verizon Mobile network, branded as Jetpack. The company offered home Internet service through a 4G LTE Broadband Router with Voice that can connect up to 10 devices over Wi-Fi as well as home phone service. This service and device have since been discontinued.

== LTE in Rural America ==
The LTE in Rural America Program (or LRA program), introduced in May 2010, covers 2.7 million potential users over 225,000 square miles (580,000 km^{2}) in 169 rural counties. Under this program, partners lease spectrum from Verizon Wireless and connect to the company's network, and Verizon provides technical support and resources to help the rural wireless company build out its own 4G LTE network. The program extends the footprint of 4G LTE coverage for both the rural carrier and Verizon, as customers can take advantage of both networks. As of 2015, all LRA members have fully rolled out their 4G LTE networks.

== See also ==
- Comparison of mobile phone standards
- List of mobile network operators in the United States
