= CustomerVision BizWiki =

CustomerVision BizWiki was a wiki application, geared to medium- and large-sized businesses, that existed from around 2006 to 2008. It was developed and sold by CustomerVision, a company founded by Cindy Rockwell, Brian Keairns and Cliff Monlux.

CustomerVision BizWiki was reviewed in publications such as Network World, Intranet Journal and Internetnews.com. It was also a finalist for the Intranet Journal Product of the Year award for 2007, and for KMWorld Magazine's 2006 km Promise Awards.
