= MedPage Today =

Medical news website

- Available in: English
- Founded: March 2005; 21 years ago
- Owner: Ziff Davis
- Editor: Jeremy Faust
- Products: Health information services
- Website: www.medpagetoday.com
- Registration: Required

MedPage Today is a medical news-focused site owned by Ziff-Davis, LLC. It is based in New York City, and is geared primarily toward medical and health professionals. The company covers clinical and policy news and medical meetings. MedPage's Editor in Chief is Jeremy Faust, an emergency physician at Brigham and Women's Hospital and an assistant professor at Harvard Medical School. MedPage's editorial board was formed in 2022.

== History ==
The news service MedPage Today was founded by Robert S. Stern in March 2005. In January 2010, the organization was provided approval for offering American Academy of Family Physicians-accredited CME credits in collaboration with the Office of Continuing Medical Education at the University of Pennsylvania School of Medicine.

In December 2010, the organization was acquired by Everyday Health, a subsidiary of Ziff-Davis. In July 2011, MedPage Today announced a collaboration with the American Heart Association for a daily email newsletter named Cardiovascular Daily. In June 2017, MedPage Today started to collaborate with the Endocrine Society on a "Reading Room" combining articles from the two organizations.

MedPage has won several Platinum eHealthcare Leadership Award multiple times in different categories.

== In news ==
=== Rising case of amputation ===
During October 2017, Cheryl Clark of MedPage Today wrote an independent statistical and clinical analysis on the rise in cases of amputation for the patients with diabetes from 2013 onwards. This analysis invited mixed receptions from the different parts of the medical profession.

=== Investigations of opioid painkillers ===
During 2011 and 2012, MedPage Today and the Milwaukee Journal Sentinel jointly investigated the "questionable financial relationships" between the pharmaceutical companies that commercially produce narcotic painkillers and numerous nonprofit organizations that advocate for the pain treatment. The investigation included the special report where it was claimed that UW Pain & Policy Studies Group (a University of Wisconsin-Madison–based organization of medical professionals) received the undisclosed amount of $2.5 million from drug manufacturers to advocate and promote the usage and prescription of opioid-based drugs. The investigation was further extended by a U.S. Senate Committee on its merit. Endorsing the findings of the journalistic investigation, the chairman of the U.S. Senate Committee, Max Baucus, remarked, "It is clear that the United States is suffering from an epidemic of accidental deaths and addiction resulting from increased use of powerful narcotic painkillers". While the committee also described the situation of pervasive practice of prescribing opioid painkillers as an "epidemic", the focus of the discussion was the drug OxyContin, manufactured by Purdue Pharma.

During 2015, MedPage Today and The Milwaukee Journal-Sentinel jointly in their investigative report mentioned the troubled history of approval of Opana ER as done by the FDA and its consequent pervasive abuse. Triggered by the report and its consequent aftermath, the FDA decided to remove the opioid painkiller from the market for the second time during June 2017 where the same drug was removed from the market in 1979 followed by the alarming abuse during 1960 and 1970.

=== Dinner table story ===
In November 2017, MedPage Today published a critical report on the insurance machinery and its way of functioning which was referred to as "dinner table stories" by others. The report fueled controversy and its reception was mixed; some regarded it as useful for exposing the unethical practices carried out by the insurance officials, while others raised questions of factual accuracy and criticized the depiction of the preauthorization process.

=== Suicide cases ===
MedPage Today is known for carrying out series of analysis on suicide cases, instances, rates, etc. In September 2018, MedPage Today published a report blaming medical professionals including physicians and their "lack of clinical training" as the reason for the rising rate of suicide in the United States. The focus of the report was to fix the accountability of the suicides on the physicians and the rising rate of suicide was blamed to be a result of the failure of the physicians in general. The report invited severe criticism from physicians and the hypothesis in the report was rejected by most of the medical professionals.
