= Everyday Health Group =

Digital media company

Everyday Health, Inc.
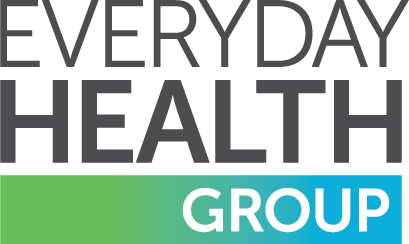
- Type: Subsidiary
- Headquarters: New York City, U.S.
- Services: Healthcare information, media production
- Owner: Ziff Davis
- Number of employees: 520 (2013)
- Website: Everyday Health Group

Everyday Health Group is a digital media company which owns websites and produces content relating to health and wellness for consumers and medical professionals. For consumers, its brands include Everyday Health, Diabetes Daily, Migraine Again, DailyOM, What to Expect, BabyCenter, and Emma’s Diary. Its brands for professionals include Health eCareers, Prime Medical, MedPage Today, and Castle Connolly. Everyday Health Group is a division of the Ziff Davis Media and internet conglomerate.

== History ==
The company was founded in 2002 by entrepreneurs Benjamin Wolin and Michael Keriakos to invest in the creation of online health content for major "offline" health brands. At the time, it was known as Agora Media. It merged with Streetmail.com to become Waterfront Media.

In October 2008, the company merged with Revolution Health, in a deal valued at $300 million USD. The combined company, operating under the Waterfront Media name, was projected to have $100 million USD revenue in 2009, double its 2007 revenue.

In 2009, Everyday Health signed a multi-year deal with MayoClinic to add MayoClinic’s consumer site to its health properties, a partnership that has persisted for over a decade.

In 2010, the company changed its name to Everyday Health. The company attempted an IPO in November 2010, which ultimately failed due to changes in "circumstances regarding the securities markets". In December 2010, Everyday Health acquired professional website MedPage Today.

By 2011, the company's network of sites had partnerships with brands and personalities such as Denise Austin and the South Beach Diet.

Throughout 2011, the company began to diversify into digital media: in 2011 co-produced a self-titled TV series with Litton Entertainment for Litton's Weekend Adventure. It also hired Paul Slavin, a veteran producer from ABC News, to help operate a new studio for the company. In October 2011, YouTube announced that Everyday Health would become part of its Original Channel Initiative, which aimed to fund the production of professionally produced original web content. Everyday Health would launch Everyday Health TV through the program, featuring original health and lifestyle-related series.

In 2012, the company acquired EQAL, most notable for the lonelygirl15 web series and fellow YouTube channel u look haute, for an undisclosed amount. EQAL became a separate division of the company. Additionally, Everyday Health started co-producing a television version of Recipe Rehab, one of the series featured on its YouTube channel. The series ran from October 6, 2012 through July 25, 2015.

The company’s initial public offering was on March 28, 2014 on the New York Stock Exchange, under the symbol EVDY. On October 21, 2016, Ziff Davis, at that time a subsidiary of j2 Global, agreed to acquire Everyday Health. The acquisition was completed on December 8, 2016.

In February 2017, it was reported that j2 Global was considering selling off the less profitable parts of Everyday Health.

In 2017, DHI Group sold the job recruiting site Health eCareers to Everyday Health Group for $15 million USD. On Health eCareers, healthcare employers can post job listings on the site to connect with doctors, nurses, and other healthcare providers looking for new opportunities.

In 2018, EHG acquired the medical continuing education and research company Prime Medical. In late 2018, it acquired Castle Connolly, a ratings website for healthcare facilities and providers that publishes the Top Doctor series, including annual awards for the peer-nominated "America’s Top Doctors". It also purchased the pregnancy and parenting website BabyCenter from Johnson & Johnson. BabyCenter joined What to Expect as part of the Everyday Health Pregnancy and Parenting division.

EHG became a sponsor of the health conference HLTH in 2019.

In 2020, Everyday Health Group acquired the patient advocacy and community site Migraine Again, for people living with migraines and chronic headaches.

The following year, Everyday Health Group acquired two more sites into its portfolio: Diabetes Daily and DailyOM. Diabetes Daily is a patient community and advocacy site, while DailyOM offers courses in holistic living and self-improvement, inspirations, and horoscopes.

At the beginning of 2022, EHG acquired Emma’s Diary, a UK-based company that offers baby and parenting advice, as part of a larger purchase of the company Lifecycle Marketing Ltd.

Everyday Health Group also has a marketing partnership with the medical academic journal Cureus. Everyday Health is also one of the health portals that has partnered with healthcare platform TrialReach to match patients to clinical trials.

== Subsidiaries and acquisitions ==
- Everyday Health (online publication)
- MedPage Today, acquired in 2010
- EQAL (known for lonelygirl15 web series), acquired in 2012
- Health eCareers, acquired in 2017
- BabyCenter, acquired in 2019
- Migraine Again, acquired in 2020
- DailyOM, acquired in 2020
- Emma’s Diary, acquired in 2022
- Castle Connolly
- Prime Education
- Diabetes Daily
- Migraine Again
- Prime Medical
