= Jim Louderback =

American businessman

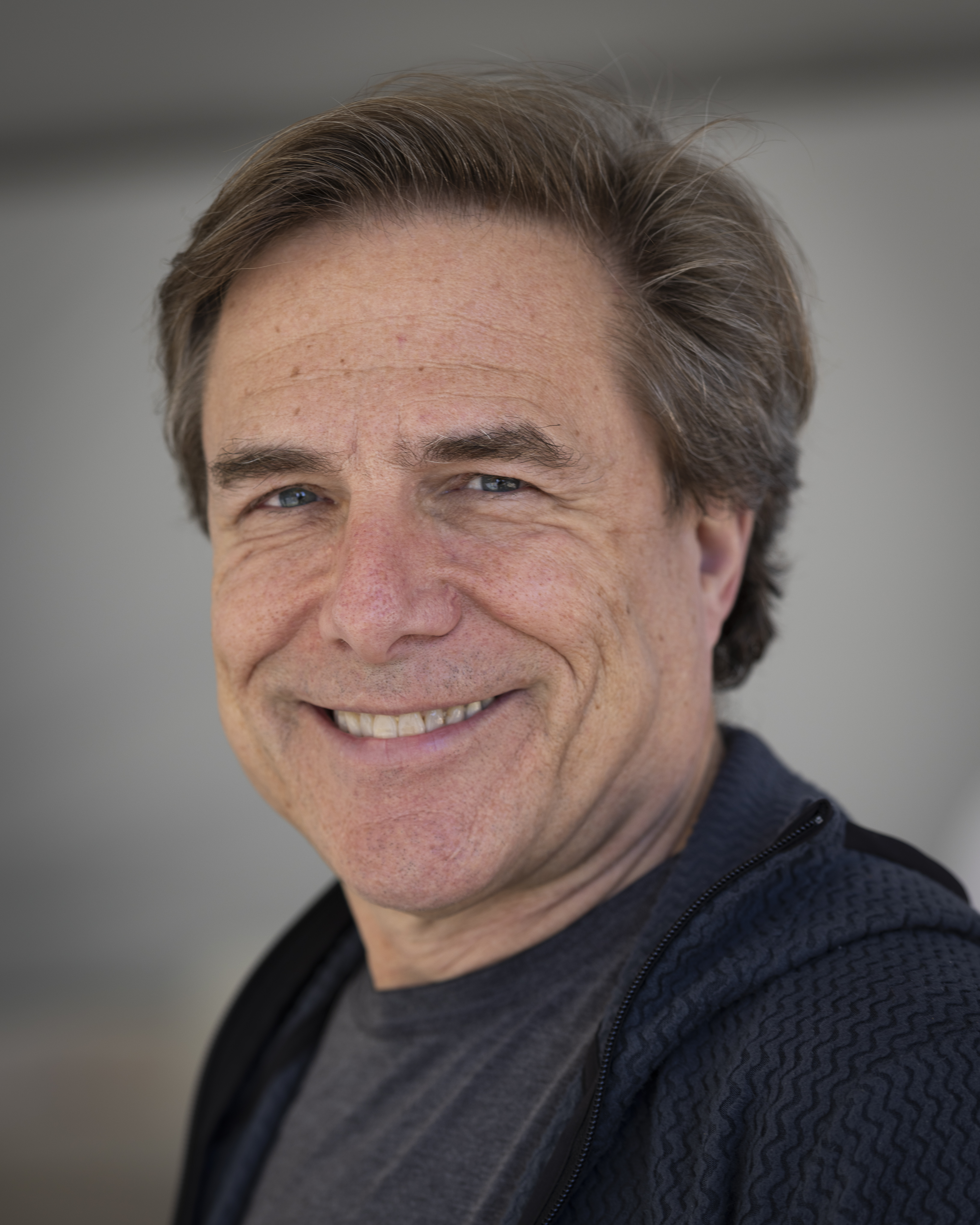
- Louderback in July 2026
- Born: 1961 (age 64–65)
- Education: Northfield Mount Hermon School; University of Vermont (BS); New York University Stern School of Business (MBA)
- Occupations: CEO (VidCon, Revision3 [formerly]); Writer, Editor, Producer
- Website: Revision3

James Louderback (born 1961) is the CEO of VidCon, and was previously the CEO of Revision3. He has had numerous jobs in media companies involved in technology, most notably with TechTV and editor-in-chief of PC Magazine. He is also well known as the television host of TechTV's Fresh Gear for three years from 1998 to 2000.

== Early life ==
Louderback graduated from Northfield Mount Hermon School, then attended the University of Vermont in Burlington, Vermont from 1979 to 1983. He graduated Phi Beta Kappa in 1983 with a Bachelor of Science in Mathematics and a minor in Communications.

Upon graduating from the University of Vermont, Louderback went on to New York University Stern School of Business located in New York, New York. He graduated Beta Gamma Sigma in 1986 receiving a M.B.A. with a concentration in Computer Applications and Information Systems.

== Career ==
Louderback started out working for Fortune 100 companies in the 1980s building computer systems and LAN-based client-server systems.

In 1991, Louderback was hired as the Executive Lab Director of PC Week magazine. In his time with the publication, Louderback refined the product reviews into essential news stories. For his work, he was awarded "Best Journalist" in 1993 by the SPA.

Louderback's next position was as the Editor-in-Chief of Windows Sources from 1995 to 1996 in New York. In 1996, Louderback headed back to Boston to become the Vice President and Editorial Director at PC Week.

In 1997, Louderback headed out to San Francisco, California to be Vice President and Editorial Director of ZDTV (later TechTV), the first 24-hour technology television channel. He was in charge of the program content for the channel. He also appeared in numerous segments on the network, and hosted the Fresh Gear show for three years.

In 1999, he developed the "Best of CES" awards program for the CES trade show. This program judges new products on the trade show floor and still continues to this day.

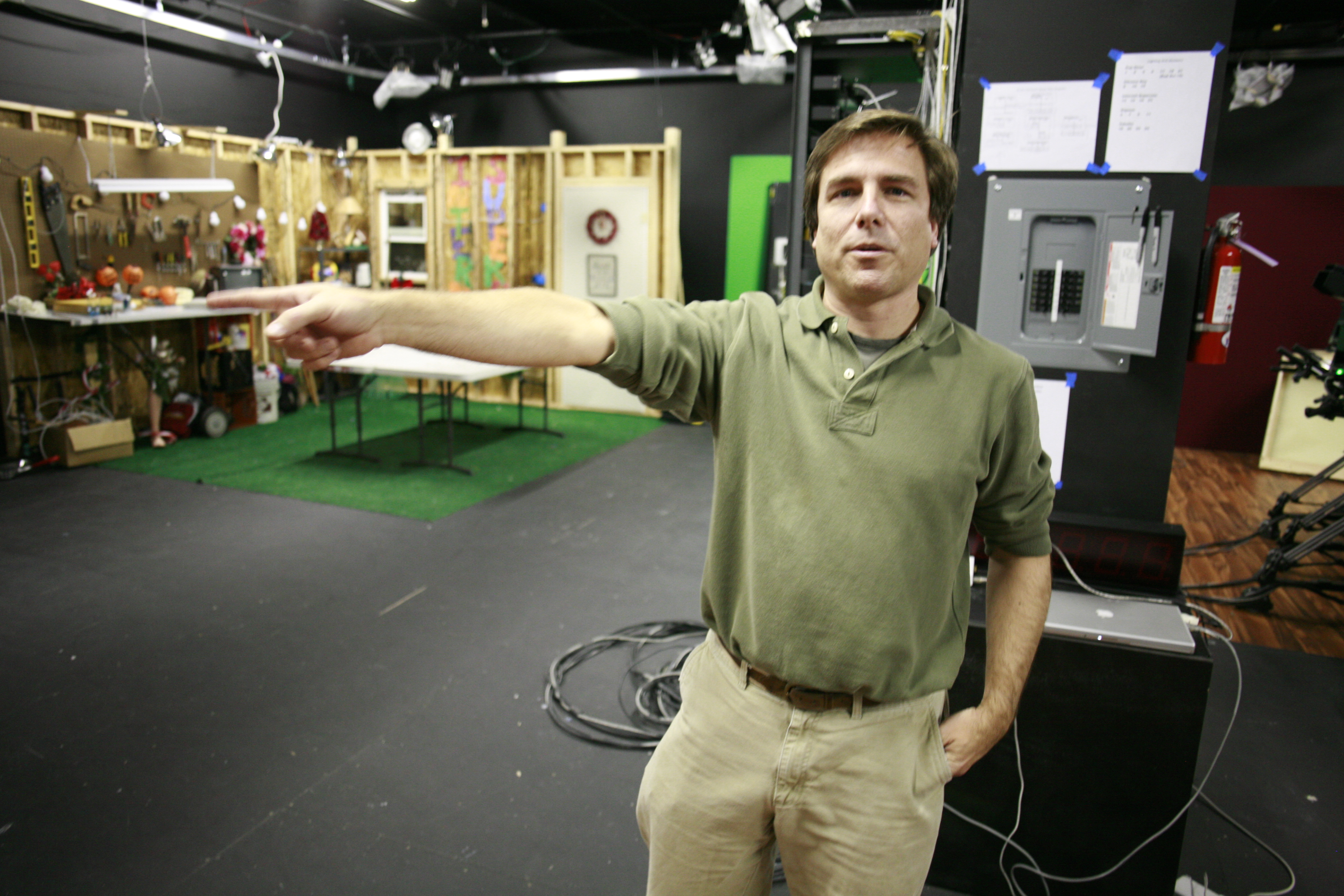
Jim Louderback in the Revision3 studio

Louderback developed a daily 8-hour live TechTV news program called TechLive in 2000. The show supplied viewers with a steady stream of market news, technology reporting, product information, and CEO interviews.

Louderback became Editor-In-Chief for Ziff Davis Media's internet properties in 2002, he managed PCMag.com, eWeek and Microsoft Watch. He was promoted to Senior Vice President and Editor in Chief of PC Magazine in the fall of 2005 where he managed DL.TV, Cranky Geeks, and ExtremeTech, TechnoRide, GearLog, and Smart Company. He also did a weekly podcast along with Patrick Norton called What's New Now as well as a video podcast called DL.TV. In 2007, he wrote "The iPhone is deeply flawed. Apple will sell lots at first and then sales will plummet."

On July 10, 2007, Louderback became CEO of Revision3. After 7 years, Louderback resigned to focus efforts on a book about being a first time CEO.

On August 29, 2017, Louderback was named as CEO of VidCon, replacing VidCon co-founder Hank Green. Louderback had served as editorial director of VidCon's industry programming track for the last three years.

== Books ==
Louderback is the author of the book TechTV Microsoft(R) Windows XP for Home Users.

== Contributor ==
Since early 2011, Louderback has been one of the featured "CoolHotNot Tech Xperts," along with John C. Dvorak, Chris Pirillo, Dave Graveline, Robin Raskin, Dave Whittle, Steve Bass, and Cheryl Currid. At CoolHotNot's web site, Dvorak and rest of the Tech Xperts used to share their "Loved List" of favorite consumer electronics, their "Wanted List" of tech products they would like to try, and their "Letdown List" of tech products they found disappointing.

== See also ==
- Ziff Davis Media
- TechTV
- Revision3
