= Offers.com =

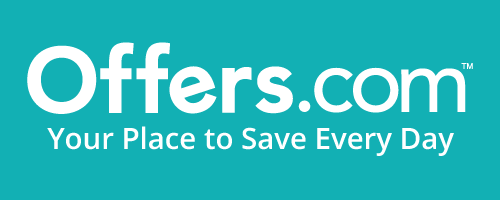
- Type: Subsidiary
- Industry: Online media
- Founded: Austin, TX (2009)
- Headquarters: Austin, Texas, USA
- Key people: Steve Schaffer, Howard Schaffer, Joshua Butts
- Parent: Ziff Davis Media
- Website: www.Offers.com

Offers.com is an online marketplace that connects consumers with coupons, coupon codes, product deals, and special offers from about 16,000 retailers and brands.

== History ==
Offers.com was founded in 2009 by Steve Schaffer. In 2010, the company received a $7 million investment from Susquehanna Growth Equity. The company was acquired by Ziff Davis in December 2015.

== Consumer research and insights ==
Offers.com conducts several consumer surveys throughout the year and pairs them with internal user behavior to gain insights on retail shopping trends. The company publishes survey findings on its blog to provide consumers with shopping and savings advice.

Offers.com's data and savings tips have been quoted by national publications such as Time, eMarketer, ABC News and Consumer Reports among others.

== Related applications ==
The Offers.com app is available for iOS and Android smartphones. The app functions much like the Offers.com site, enabling users to search for coupons and deals from retailers and restaurants. Offers.com also provides a browser extension available for Chrome and Firefox. The extension alerts users of any current deals, discounts, or coupon codes available at stores they visit online.
