= BabyCenter =

Parenting website and mobile app

- Website type: Reference pages
- Founded: October 1997
- Headquarters: New York City
- Owner: Everyday Health Group
- Website: BabyCenter.com
- Commercial: yes; ad-supported
- Registration: Required for app and forums

BabyCenter is an online media company based in New York City that provides information on conception, pregnancy, birth, and early childhood development for parents and expecting parents. BabyCenter operates 6 country and region specific properties including websites, apps, emails, print publications, and an online community where parents can connect on a variety of topics. The visitors of website and the users of the app can sign up for free weekly email newsletters that guide them through pregnancy and their child's development.

In addition to publishing detailed, medically reviewed information about pregnancy and parenting, BabyCenter, under its Mission Motherhood initiative, ran numerous social programs and has participated in public health initiatives in partnership with hospitals, healthcare agencies, nonprofits, NGOs, and government agencies to provide pregnancy and parenting advice.

It also annually publishes the most popular baby names.

BabyCenter LLC is part of the Everyday Health Group, a division of Ziff Davis.

== History ==
BabyCenter was founded in October 1997 by Stanford University MBA graduates Matt Glickman and Mark Selcow, who recognized a need for information about pregnancy and parenting on the internet. BabyCenter was initially funded through $13.5 million in startup capital funding from venture capital firms, including Bessemer Venture Partners, Intel, and Trinity Ventures. The funds were used to open the BabyCenter Store in October 1998.

In the early years of its operation, BabyCenter offered multiple resources and services for parents, including a website that provided medically reviewed information and guidance to new and expectant parents on such topics as fertility, labor, and childcare; a weekly email for pregnant women tailored to their week of pregnancy (based on their pregnancy due date); and community groups and chat rooms for pregnant couples and parents to discuss pregnancy and child-rearing strategies.

The site grew quickly, and by early 1999 had 175 employees and an annual revenue of $35 million. In April of that year, the two founders sold BabyCenter to another website, eToys.com, for $190 million in stock. Twenty-three months later, in 2001, shortly before declaring bankruptcy, eToys sold the site to Johnson & Johnson for $10 million. During the eToys ownership, BabyCenter launched its first international E-commerce site in the UK during the spring of 2000.

Starting in 2005, BabyCenter launched an expansion plan, extending its global network to Australia, Canada and other countries, staffing each outpost with local editors. In 2007, BabyCenter debuted a Mandarin-language site in China, initiated operations in India, launched a Spanish language website, and introduced its first mobile site. BabyCenter released My Pregnancy Today, its first mobile app, to Apple's App Store in August 2010 and to the Android market in April 2011. The app provided daily information, nutrition tips, advice relevant to the user's week of pregnancy, and 3-D animated videos showcasing a baby's development in utero. The My Pregnancy app was joined by a My Baby Today app in October 2011. In 2015, BabyCenter released Mom Feed, its first mobile app for parents of toddlers and older children (ages 1 to 8). Mom Feed offered personalized, stage-based information as well as content from the BabyCenter Community and Blog in a real-time stream.

In 2016, BabyCenter launched its web-based Baby Names Finder. In 2018, Mom Feed was discontinued and BabyCenter replaced that experience with a separate Child Health content area on its website. Also in 2018, BabyCenter launched its mobile baby name generator, the Baby Names app, which, like the web-based Baby Names Finder, leverages data from hundreds of thousands of parents that culminates in its annual most popular Baby Names Report.

In 2019, Johnson & Johnson sold Baby Center to Everyday Health Group, a division of New York-based parent company of Ziff Davis, Inc. Neither side disclosed terms of the deal.

In February 2026, BabyCenter launched a rewards program allowing users to earn points toward free products.

== Popular research ==
- BabyCenter's most popular baby names is released annually and often cited by the media.
- In March 2024, BabyCenter did a review of the app Temu and said that the website has found products that have been recalled, could be counterfeit or circumvent U.S. safety standards and features that are important in preventing issues like choking.
- In 2025, BabyCenter released a report about the cost of raising a newborn baby in the first year.

== Content and products ==
=== Websites ===
BabyCenter has 6 country and region-specific websites around the world, including sites for the United States, Canada, Australia, Brazil, the United Kingdom, and Latin America. Users can find parenting and pregnancy advice in three languages: English, Spanish, and Portuguese.

BabyCenter content for each country- or region-specific site is written by an editorial team based in that country or region. Medical and health content for each site is reviewed by a medical advisory board based there and adheres to that country or region's medical standards. For example, the U.S. site works with and follows the recommendations of such U.S. medical authorities as the American Academy of Pediatrics, the American Congress of Obstetrics & Gynecology and the Society for Maternal-Fetal Medicine.

BabyCenter regularly conducts research and provides thought leadership on pregnancy and parenting topics, popularly cited by major media outlets including The Wall Street Journal, Forbes, The Washington Post, BuzzFeed, Insider, MarketWatch, Axios.

=== Community, blogs and social ===
From its earliest days, BabyCenter has had a community area that allows people to join a group of parents with children born in the same month, known as a Birth Club. BabyCenter launched a blog called Momformation in 2007. Eventually, the name was changed to BabyCenter Blog.

In April 2021, the BabyCenter Community was identified in a research article within the journal PLOS Computational Biology as facilitating "unobstructed communication" between parents, which avoids the "strong echo chamber phenomena" that can foster and perpetuate vaccine misinformation.

=== My Pregnancy and Baby Today App ===
The app is available in three languages, although not all features are supported for every market. Initially the apps only featured pregnancy articles that could be found on the BabyCenter website, but over the years the feature set has expanded to include a growing list of app-specific tools such as weekly fetal development information, a kick tracker, a birth plan worksheet, a contraction timer, a baby growth tracker, a photo journal for pregnant women to record their pregnancy bellies, and a photo journal for documenting a baby's first year.

=== Mission Motherhood™ ===
BabyCenter was a cofounder of the Mobile Alliance for Maternal Action (MAMA), a public-private partnership between USAID, Johnson & Johnson, the UN Foundation, and BabyCenter from 2011 to-to 2015. The MAMA program sparked the creation of MomConnect, an initiative of the South African Department of Health for which BabyCenter developed SMS messages with health information about pregnancy and a child's first year of life.

BabyCenter helped develop similar messages for mMitra, a voice messaging program in India. A research article in the Maternal and Child Health Journal stated the mMitra program offered strong evidence "that tailored mobile phone voice messages can improve key infant care knowledge and practices that lead to improved infant health outcomes in low-resource settings.

BabyCenter's Mission Motherhood Messages were available to qualifying organizations on the BabyCenter website.

BabyCenter contributed websites for Free Basics. These websites featured age and stage-based pregnancy and baby articles targeted to low-income, lower-education women who would not otherwise have access to health information. Content developed for this program was also used to support a UNICEF SMS program during the 2016 Zika outbreak.

== Awards and recognition ==
In 1998, BabyCenter won a Webby Award for Best Home Site. Since then, it has been nominated for a Webby Award 19 times and won either a Webby or a People's Choice Webby Award 12 times – including a People's Voice win in 2021 for Lifestyle websites and mobile sites and a Webby in 2025 for Social – Health & Wellness.

In 2002, it won Service Journalism award from Online Journalism Awards (OJA).

In 2015, BabyCenter won five Digital Health Awards for content about autism in children. In 2016, BabyCenter won seven Digital Health Awards: four for videos about the aches and pains of pregnancy, baby sleep, and the walking milestone in child development; two for articles about baby sleep training and sleep apnea in babies; and one for the BabyCenter mobile app My Pregnancy & Baby Today. In 2021, Forbes Health chose My Pregnancy & Baby Today as the best pregnancy app of 2021, and Women's Health identified it as one of the best pregnancy apps of the year.
