= Into Tomorrow =

Into Tomorrow with Dave Graveline
- Genre: Talk show
- Running time: 3 hours
- Country of origin: United States
- Language: English
- Home station: Advanced Radio Network
- Hosted by: Dave Graveline
- Recording studio: Miami, Florida
- Original release: 1996 – present
- Website: www.IntoTomorrow.com
- Podcast: link

Into Tomorrow with Dave Graveline is a weekly, three-hour-long American talk radio show hosted by Dave Graveline on the "Advanced Radio Network".

== Brief history ==
"Into Tomorrow" officially launched in January 1996 at the "Consumer Electronics Show" in Las Vegas.

The show has continued to grow over the years and is currently heard on over 160 AM and FM stations across the United States, on the Armed Forces Network and online in streams and podcasts.

Over the years Graveline extended the show to include other "new media" outlets and today he produces weekly video updates that can be watched on YouTube[5] and other video sites.

== Format ==
=== Studio Shows ===
A typical "Into Tomorrow" show is made up of three self-contained hours, each of which features questions from listeners, technology-related news, commentary and discussion and consumer electronics related guest interviews.

=== Remote Broadcasts ===
The "Into Tomorrow" team travels to technology trade shows all over the world to report on the latest consumer electronics products being introduced.

These travels result in either full shows recorded from the trade shows featuring more interviews and no listener questions, or in hybrid shows in which part of the team records a show from the studio answering questions and commenting on technology news stories while part of the team reports on the latest from the show floor.

== On-Air Personalities ==
- Dave Graveline, Host
- Chris Graveline, Co-Host

Formerly:

- Rob Almanza, Co-Host
- Mark Lautenschlager, Co-Host
