= Dave Graveline =

American radio talk show host

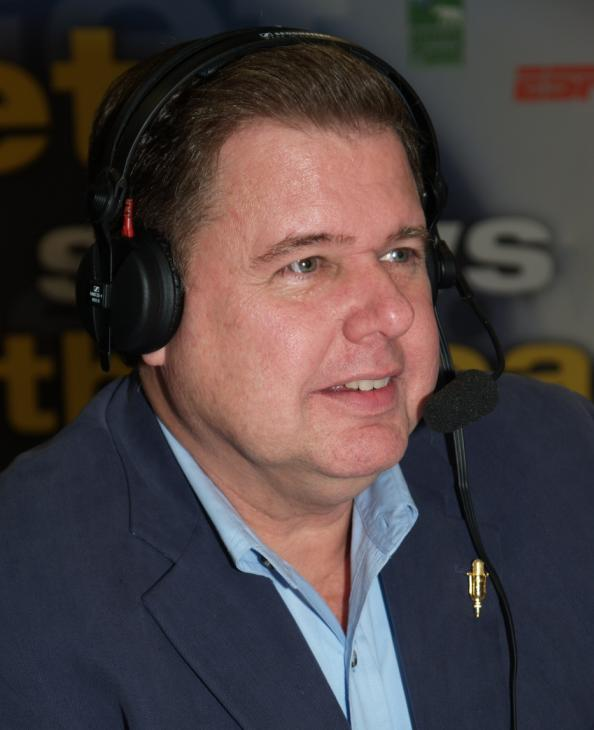
- Dave Graveline
- Born: Dave Graveline; Miami, Florida, U.S.
- Occupation(s): Radio host, television personality
- Children: Elizabeth, Christopher, Timothy
- Website: IntoTomorrow.com

Dave Graveline is an American radio talk show host. His syndicated show "Into Tomorrow" has been on the air since 1996 and currently airs on over 100 AM and FM stations throughout the U.S., stations in Canada and on the Armed Forces Network, as well as on several foreign radio stations.

== Early career ==
Graveline has worked for most radio and television stations in South Florida including WIOD, WKAT, WINZ, WMXJ, WTVJ Channel 4, WCIX-CBS and he has produced and hosted several national television specials including: PBS's Florida Outdoors, ESPN's The Grand Prix of Miami, SportsChannel's Thoroughbred Racing Reviews, the Miss Florida USA Pageants, nationally syndicated Spring Break Reunion and many local and national TV commercials, documentaries, on-camera productions, voice-overs and training videos.

Graveline was the host of The Outdoor Channel's television program "Action Shooters" for 5 seasons.

== Law enforcement ==
Before focusing on radio, Graveline worked for several years for the Metro-Dade Police Department as a Police Officer and Detective. Around this time he also became an FBI certified instructor.

=== Dade County Police Spokesman ===
During his years with Metro-Dade, Graveline served in Media Relations as the Official Police Spokesman for Dade County.

== Radio ==
Graveline has had a lifelong interest in radio and he was involved in starting "WKHS" radio station at his highschool.

He has worked professionally in radio for many years as both a DJ and talk radio host, as well as several years as a political commentator.

Graveline is best known as a leader in consumer electronics radio talk in the United States and has been ranked as one of the most influential radio hosts in America by Talkers Magazine.

=== Toys For Boys ===
Graveline's career in consumer technology talk radio began in 1995 when he created and hosted the show "Toys for Boys" on WIOD, a South Florida station broadcasting from Miramar, Florida.

By January 1996 the show had been picked up for syndication and renamed "Into Tomorrow".

=== Into Tomorrow ===
"Into Tomorrow" officially launched in January 1996 at the "Consumer Electronics Show" in Las Vegas.

The show has continued to grow over the years and is currently heard on over 160 AM and FM stations across the United States, on the Armed Forces Network and online in streams and podcasts.

Over the years Graveline extended the show to include other "new media" outlets and today he produces weekly video updates that can be watched on YouTube and other video sites.

== Other media ==
Graveline has worked in television in various capacities including news anchor, producer, host and as a consultant. Since 2006 he is the resident master of ceremonies at the annual Global Press Conference of Messe Berlin's IFA consumer electronics fair.

=== CoolHotNot ===
Since early 2011, Graveline has been one of the featured "CoolHotNot Tech Xperts," along with John C. Dvorak, Chris Pirillo, Jim Louderback, Robin Raskin, Dave Whittle, Steve Bass, and Cheryl Currid. At CoolHotNot's web site, Graveline shares his "Loved List" of favorite consumer electronics, his "Wanted List" of tech products he'd like to try, and his "Letdown List" of tech products he found disappointing.
