= Rural Cellular =

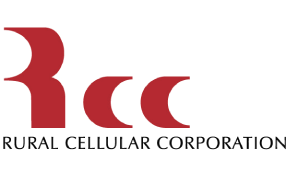
- Company type: Defunct
- Industry: Cellular Communications
- Founded: 1990
- Successor: Verizon Wireless
- Headquarters: Alexandria, Minnesota, United States
- Key people: Richard Eckstrand(CEO, President, & Director)
- Products: Cellular Telephone Service
- Revenue: 125.7 Million in Q3 of 2003
- Number of employees: 1,001
- Website: https://web.archive.org/web/*/unicel.com

Rural Cellular was a telecommunications company that had run the Unicel mobile network. It operated in Midwest, Northeast, Northwest and the Southern regions of the United States and was bought by Verizon Wireless on January 25, 2009, for approximately $2.67 billion in cash and assumed debt.

== History ==
Rick Ekstrand founded Rural Cellular Corporation (RCC) in 1990 through the partnership of 40 telephone companies that held five cellular licenses. The company’s original service area was located north and west of St. Cloud, Minnesota.

Following its initial public offering in February 1996, RCC pursued a series of acquisitions that expanded its directly marketed population served (POPs) from 600,000 to 6.4 million.

On July 30, 2007, Verizon Wireless announced an agreement to acquire Rural Cellular Corporation in order to expand its network coverage. At the time of the acquisition, RCC, headquartered in Alexandria, Minnesota, served 716,000 customers in New Hampshire, Maine, Vermont, New York, Massachusetts, Alabama, Mississippi, Minnesota, North Dakota, South Dakota, Wisconsin, Kansas, Idaho, Washington, and Oregon.
