= Speedtest.net =

Service that provides analysis of Internet performance

Speedtest

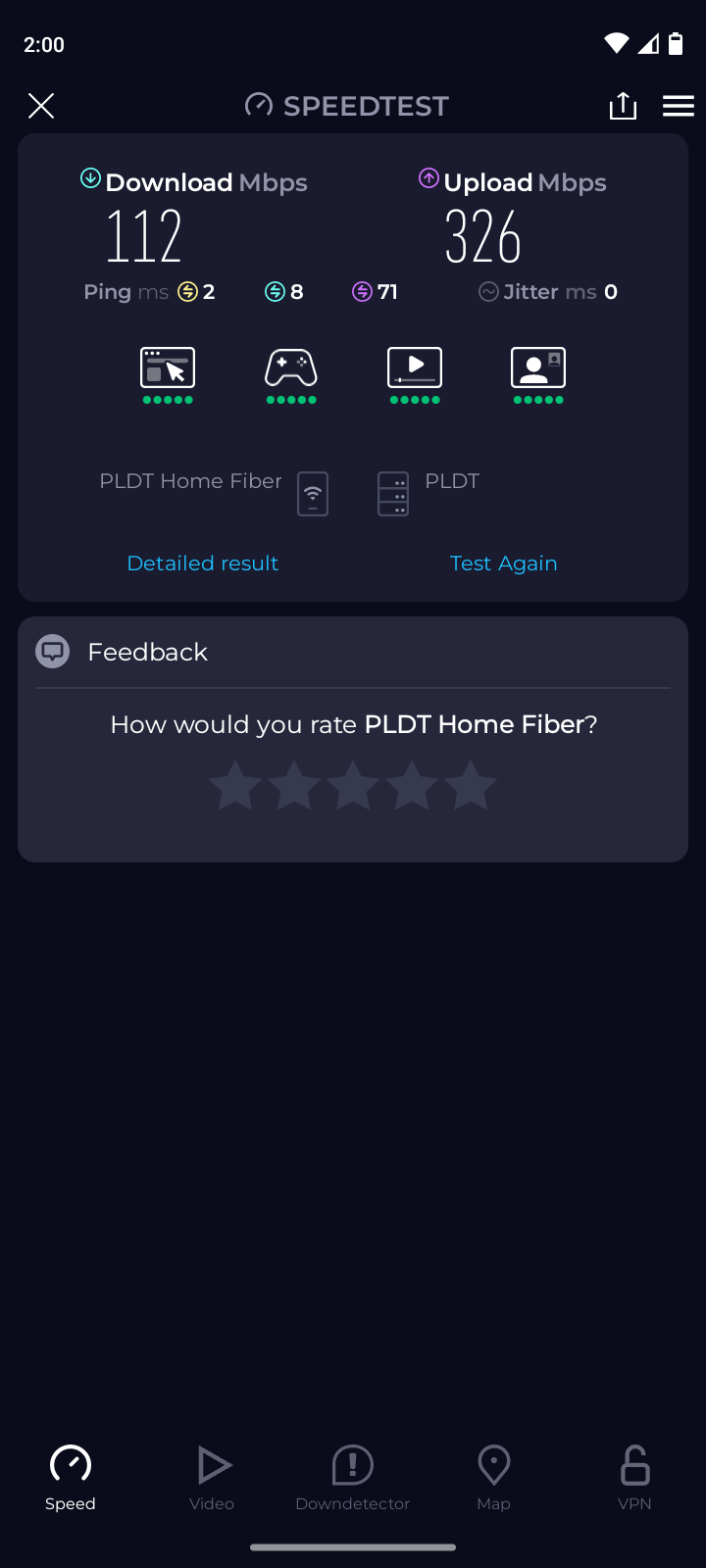
- Screenshot of the Speedtest.net app on Android
- Original author: Ookla
- Developer: Ookla
- Release: April 1, 2006; 20 years ago

Stable release(s)
- Android: 6.3.0 / 30 July 2025; 15 months ago
- iOS/iPadOS/tvOS: 6.3.2 / 15 September 2025; 14 months ago
- macOS: 1.27 / 6 March 2023; 3 years ago
- Chrome Web Store: 1.0.9.11 / 14 June 2023; 3 years ago
- Operating system: Windows, Windows Phone, Website, Android, iOS, Apple TV, Mac, Chrome Web Store
- Available in: 19 languages
- List of languages Arabic, Chinese (Simple), Chinese (Traditional), Danish, Dutch, English, German, French, Hebrew, Indonesian, Italian, Japanese, Korean, Polish, Portuguese, Russian, Spanish, Swedish, Thai
- Type: Internet speed test
- License: Freeware
- Website: www.speedtest.net
- Repository: github.com/teamookla/speedtest-tools

Speedtest.net, also known as Speedtest by Ookla, is a web service that provides free analysis of Internet access performance metrics, such as connection data rate and latency. It is the flagship product of Ookla, a web testing and network diagnostics company founded in 2006, and based in Seattle, Washington, United States.

The service measures the data throughput (speed) and latency (connection delay) of an Internet connection against one of over 16,000 geographically dispersed servers (as of December 2023). Each test measures the data rate for the download direction, i.e. from the server to the user's computer, and the upload data rate, i.e. from the user's computer to the server. The tests are performed within the user's web browser or within mobile apps. As of 17 February 2024, over 52.3 billion internet speed tests have been completed.

Tests were previously performed over HTTP. To improve accuracy, Speedtest.net now performs tests via a custom protocol over TCP sockets.

The site also offers detailed statistics based on test results. This data has been used by numerous publications in the analysis of internet access data rates around the world.

== History ==
The owner and operator of Speedtest.net, Ookla, was established in 2006 by partners Mike Apgar and Doug Suttles. Suttles suggested the name Ookla because he already owned the Ookla.com domain name in honor of his pet cat, who was in turn named for a character on the TV series Thundarr the Barbarian. The domain speedtest.net has been used to host a speed test since 2000, and was acquired by Ookla in 2006.

As of 2011, Ookla claimed 80% market share and was one of the top 1000 most popular websites. At the time, Ookla derived its revenue primarily from fees paid by companies to license custom speed test and proprietary testing software. Clients reportedly included media companies like CNN and Disney, and telecommunications providers like AT&T, Verizon, and CenturyLink.

Ookla was acquired by Ziff Davis in 2014.

On 30 July 2025, Russia blocked Speedtest.

Ziff Davis sold Ookla to Accenture in 2026.

=== Acquisitions ===
Acquisition date	Company	Country	Ref.
19 June 2018	Mosaik	USA	
9 August 2018	Downdetector	Netherlands	
10 October 2018	Ekahau	Finland	
July 2021	Solutelia (WINd software suite)	USA	
December 2021	RootMetrics	USA	

== Technology ==
Speedtest.net started as a Flash-based broadband speed test service. After Adobe deprecated Flash, and announced its End-Of-Life (EOL), Ookla ported the speed test from Flash to HTML5. The new HTML5 based speed test went out of beta on January 9, 2018.

== See also ==
- List of countries by Internet connection speeds
