= Vivek R. Shah =

American businessman

- Education: Tufts University (BA)
- Occupation: CEO of Ziff Davis
- Years active: 1995–present
- Employer: Ziff Davis
- Known for: Leadership of Ziff Davis, acquisition of CNET
- Title: Chief Executive Officer
- Awards: Crain's New York Business 40 Under 40 (2006), Folio: 40 (2011), MinOnline Digital Hall of Fame

Vivek R. Shah is an American businessman. He is chief executive officer of Ziff Davis, an American internet and digital media company.

== Education ==
Shah holds a BA in political science from Tufts University.

== Career ==
Shah began his career in 1995 at Time Warner Inc. He was named president of the Fortune/Money Group in 2007.

In 2010, Shah purchased technology publisher Ziff Davis, in partnership with private equity firm Great Hill Partners. With the purchase, he became CEO of Ziff Davis. He remained with Ziff Davis following its purchase by J2 Global in 2012. Shah was appointed CEO of J2 Global, effective January 1, 2018. In 2021, following J2 Global’s name change to Ziff Davis, Shah became the CEO of Ziff Davis, Inc.

In 2006, Shah was named to Crain's New York Business' 40 Under 40. In 2011, Folio: Magazine named Shah to its Folio: 40. Shah was also named Online Publisher of the Year by MinOnline and Innovator of the Year by BtoB's Media Business, and has been inducted into MinOnline's Digital Hall of Fame.

In 2014, Shah was named chairman of the Interactive Advertising Bureau (IAB).

In August 2024, Shah, as CEO of Ziff Davis, oversaw the acquisition of CNET from Red Ventures for a reported sum exceeding $100 million.
