= EWeek =

American technology magazine

eWeek

- Editor-in-Chief: Chris Bernard (2024-)
- Categories: Computer magazine, Business magazine
- Frequency: online only
- Circulation: 20M pageviews/year
- Founded: 1983
- Final issue: 2012
- Company: TechnologyAdvice
- Country: United States
- Based in: Nashville, TN
- Language: English
- Website: eweek.com
- ISSN: 1530-6283

eWeek (Enterprise Newsweekly, stylized as eWEEK), formerly PCWeek, is a technology and business magazine. It was owned by Ziff Davis until 2012, then by QuinStreet, then in 2020 it was sold again to TechnologyAdvice, a Nashville, Tennessee marketing company.

The print edition ceased in 2012, "and eWeek became an all-digital publication"), at which time Quinstreet acquired the magazine from Internet company Ziff Davis, along with Baseline.com, ChannelInsider.com, CIOInsight.com, and WebBuyersGuide.com.

eWeek was started under the name PCWeek on Feb. 28, 1984. The magazine was called PCWeek until 2000, during which time it covered the rise of business computing in America; as eWeek, it increased its online presence and covers more kinds of worldwide technologies.

== History ==
Vol. 1, issue 42 (October 23, 1984)

The magazine was started by Ziff Davis to cover the use of computers as business tools.

Team members that started PCWeek included John Dodge, the first news editor; Lois Paul, the first features editor; and Sam Whitmore, the first reporter, who later went on to become editor-in-chief.

At the time, many magazines at the time already covered business computing, such as Datamation and Computerworld. There were also magazines dedicated to hobbyist machines, so it seemed there was no place for a weekly issue to fit in. The first few issues had only 22 pages of advertising, but then PCWeek began establishing itself. By the end of the first year, the average number of advertising pages for the last month was 74.875.

== Buyers' guides ==
John Pallatto, a writer for PCWeek in its first year, produced a full buyer's guide on all DOS-compatible PCs on the market.

Early promotional publications from PCWeek show them describing their key audience as "volume buyers," that is, people and companies that would buy PCs in bulk for business purposes. PCWeek used this argument to promote advertisement in their publication to large computer companies.

== Later success ==
PCWeek grew. Scot Peterson became eWeek's main editor in 2005, having been, a Ziff-Davis employee since 1995, and previously held the title news editor.

People involved in between PCWeek's initial success and change to eWeek were David Strom, Sam Whitmore, Mike Edelhart, Gina Smith, Peter Coffee, Paul Bonner, current editor Chris Preimesberger and many others.

Jim Louderback, a lab director at PCWeek as of 1991, describes how they were able to "get a product in on Wednesday, review it, and have it on the front page on Monday" and that "that was something we were the first to do".

In 2012, eWeek and other Ziff Davis assets were acquired by the company QuinStreet, which also runs other tech-oriented publications.

== Evolution ==
As the PC Industry evolved, PCWeek grew bigger, developing an active audience that spoke of their experiences. Successor eWeek is even more oriented towards "Lab-based product evaluation," and covers a wide range tech topics.

=== Writers ===
Among former/current writers are:

- Jessica Davis
- Scott Ferguson, former Editor in Chief of eWeek, 2006 - 2012 (when eWeek stopped their print edition "and eWeek became an all-digital publication").
- Todd Weiss, Senior Writer ("all things mobile")

== Influence ==
A famous part of PCWeek was the fictional gossip columnist by the name of "Spencer F. Katt". The column would cover all sorts of rumors and gossip about the PC Industry, and the character of Spencer F. Katt became a famous icon of the entire world of computing.

PCWeek had influence on the PC Industry that it covered and the success of business PCs contributed to the success of PCWeek. John Pallatto characterizes the rise of PCs in 1985 as a "social phenomenon", and says that "the most sought-after status symbol on Wall Street in 1985... was the key to unlock the power switch on an IBM PC AT".

PCWeek was licensed in other countries, notably Australia, where it was first published by Australian Consolidated Press. Towards the end of the 1990s, the title shifted to a publishing partnership between Ziff-Davis and Australian Provincial Newspapers where its final Australian editor was Paul Zucker.

One story from PCWeek that is well known is their coverage of "the famous 1994 flaw in the numerical processor in Intel's Pentium chip". The news they broke on Intel's processor, along with other research, caused Intel to actually pull back and fix their chips before offering new ones.

Former editor in chief Chris Preimesberger, who joined eWEEK in 2005 as a free-lancer, now runs a staff consisting of mostly free-lancers, many of whom have worked full time for eWEEK in the past and at other IT publications. The readership has been loyal through the years and now consists mostly of veteran IT professionals, company executives, software developers, investors and other people interested in the ebb and flow of the IT business and trends in products and services.

James Maguire was editor in chief for a few years until 2024. He remains as senior editor and media personality. Chris Bernard is currently the managing editor for the site and all of its staff and freelance writers and editors. He was previously the managing editor of both Datamation and Enterprise Storage Forum.

== Training ==
After 14 years at PC week, Sam Whitmore started his own firm (Media Survey). The latter, after over 2 decades, began a fellowship to train future reporters.
