= CardRatings.com =

Personal finance website

- Industry: Personal finance
- Founded: 1998
- Headquarters: Foster City, California, U.S.
- Parent: QuinStreet
- Website: CardRatings.com

CardRatings.com is a personal finance resource that helps lay people to learn about and compare credit cards. Curtis Arnold founded the websites in August 1998, amid national concerns about credit card debt. Arnold had more than $40,000 in credit card debt at one point in his life, but developed a deep understanding of the credit card industry to improve his finances. Arnold is a recognized expert on credit card and consumer debt, having published multiple books including "How You Can Profit from Credit Cards: Using Credit to Improve Your Financial Life and Bottom Line" (FT Press, 2008). Arnold has also been cited by multiple news outlets over the years, for his views on consumer debt

CardRatings.com was among the first websites providing online credit card ratings and has grown over the years to become a reputable objective source of credit card rating information. In 2016, CardRatings.com provided information on approximately 500 different credit card products that can be queried via the site's searchable knowledge base.

As part of its mission to help educate consumers about personal financing issues, CardRatings.com is also a National Partner of the Jump$tart Coalition for Financial Literacy.

The site was acquired by QuinStreet in August, 2008.

== Controversy ==
A 2014 article in the Wall St Journal detailed how credit card rating websites in general have come under pressure from credit card companies. The credit card companies have wanted sites, like CardRatings.com, to list cards in certain ways that would be beneficial to the card brands. Arnold and CardRatings.com have steadfastly refused to compromise on their integrity.
