= Emma's Diary =

British media company

- Type: Subsidiary
- Founded: 1991; 35 years ago
- Founder: Nick Wells
- Fate: Acquired by Everyday Health Group Pregnancy & Parenting in January 2022.
- Headquarters: United Kingdom
- Products: Free baby care product packs, pregnancy guide
- Services: Publishing pregnancy-related content (print and digital), medical information and advice, video content, parenting club, app
- Owner: Everyday Health Group Pregnancy & Parenting
- Parent: Ziff Davis

Emma's Diary is a British media company and parenting club that publishes pregnancy-related content through print and digital media. It is also known for distributing free resources for prenatal and postnatal care.

== History ==
Founded by Nick Wells in 1991, Emma's Diary went on to release a website and app to distribute its content digitally. With content written in accordance with NHS, NICE, and BFI guidelines, it publishes medical information, advice, and video content made for expecting parents.

The company also distributes free packs of baby care products at retailers such as Argos and Boots. It also provides a pregnancy guide compiled by GPs and midwives, which is distributed to GPs and midwives across the UK.
