= Robin Raskin =

American author, publisher, TV personality (1954–)

Robin Raskin (born May 14, 1954) is an American writer, author, publisher, TV personality, and conference and event creator best known for her ability to simplify technology for non-technologists.

== Early publications ==
Raskin began writing about technology in the 1980s. Her first technology piece appeared in a 1984 issue of InfoWorld. The article, True Confessions, documented her attraction to technology as an equalizer for women because ultimately it would provide them freedom without shackling them to an office.

Raskin became a frequent contributor to Family Computing, a Scholastic publication popular throughout the ‘80s. She frequently tested products, writing stories about raising kids in a digital world, including attempts to empower the younger generation with technology.

In 1986, Raskin began contributing to PC Magazine, then a bi-monthly magazine that had been recently purchased by Bill Ziff. Under the tutelage of Editor in Chief Bill Machrone, Raskin began creating feature stories, including a major comparison of statistical software packages.

In 1990, after her three children reached school age, Raskin accepted the job of Senior Editor at PC Magazine and ran the First Looks section of the magazine. From there, she became Executive Editor and finally Editor, serving under Michael Miller, Editor in Chief.

In 1995, Raskin became the Editor in Chief of FamilyPC Magazine, a joint venture between the Disney Publishing Company and Ziff Davis Corporation. Along with the founder of Family Fun Magazine, Jake Winebaum, Raskin developed the concept of family-tested products, where real families would live with, review technology, and earn the product a family-tested seal of approval. FamilyPC went on to become the premier publication for the technology-savvy family. At its height, the magazine grew to a circulation of more than 700,000 readers and was supplemented with exhibits at Disney World’s Innovations.

In 1999, Raskin was named Best Columnist by the Computer Press Association, and also that year, she was recognized as one of the top ten tech journalists by MC (Marketing Computers) Magazine.

== Media appearances and books ==
Over the years, Raskin has appeared regularly on CBS Up to the Minute, CBS This Morning, MSNBC, Fox TV, and others as a technology spokesperson, often featured as an expert on kids and technology. Raskin has also authored several books on raising digital kids, including Parents, Kids, and Computers (Random House, 1992) with co-author Carol Ellison, Your Child’s Education (Ziff Davis PR, May 1995) with co-author Kaare Christian, and a series of books based on the FamilyPC family-tested reviews, including the FamilyPC Guide to Cool Projects (Hyperion, September 1996) with co-authors Samuel Mead and Richard Kot, and the Family PC Guide to Homework (Hyperion, September 1996) with co-authors Greg Keizer and Richard Kot.

== Internet safety ==
Raskin has testified at the COPPA Commission hearings and has served on the National Academy of Sciences committee investigating kid’s online safety. The panel was chaired by former Attorney General, Dick Thornburgh. Raskin represented the findings in a syndicated media tour for the Academy.

== Speaking ==
Raskin has made numerous speaking appearances, including at the 2011 SXSW Interactive and InPlay. She also acts as the emcee for her events: Last Gadget Standing and Mobile Apps Showdown.

== Projects ==
Since early 2011, Raskin has been one of the featured "CoolHotNot Tech Xperts," along with John C. Dvorak, Chris Pirillo, Jim Louderback, Dave Graveline, Dave Whittle, Steve Bass, and Cheryl Currid. On CoolHotNot's website, Raskin shares her "Loved List" of favorite consumer electronics, her "Wanted List" of tech products she'd like to try, and her "Letdown List" of tech products she found disappointing.
