= MoneyRates.com =

- Industry: Personal finance
- Founded: 1999
- Headquarters: Foster City, California, U.S.
- Parent: QuinStreet
- Website: MoneyRates.com

MoneyRates.com is a personal finance website that specializes in compiling interest rates for bank products, including savings accounts, money market accounts, certificates of deposit (CDs), mortgages and credit cards. The site also produces feature articles on a variety of personal finance topics.

The site was founded in 1999 by Clark Schultz and has been frequently cited by major news outlets, including the Wall Street Journal, the New York Times and MSN Money. Site features include its America's Best Rates series, a quarterly survey of bank interest rates, and its annual Best and Worst States for Retirement articles.

Both the America's Best Rates series and the Best and Worst States for Retirement articles have been featured by major media outlets, including the Huffington Post, Consumer Reports and CNN Money. In addition, MoneyRates.com Senior Financial Analyst Richard Barrington, CFA, who was brought onto the company's team in 2009, is a frequently interviewed source on personal finance topics for major publications, including USA Today, U.S. News & World Report, MarketWatch, and National Public Radio's Marketplace.
