= Toolbox.com =

Network of online business-to-business communities

Toolbox.com LLC
- Company type: Subsidiary
- Industry: Online media
- Founded: Scottsdale, AZ (1998)
- Headquarters: Scottsdale, Arizona, USA
- Key people: Daniel Morrison, Co-Founder; George Krautzel, Co-Founder; Dave Moylan, President
- Parent: Ziff Davis Media
- Website: www.Toolbox.com

Toolbox.com is a network of online business-to-business communities geared at professionals working in the information technology, human resources, and finance fields, allowing online collaboration between professionals utilizing discussion groups, blogs, and wikis.

After being acquired by The Corporate Executive Board Company in 2007, Toolbox.com was bought by Ziff Davis in January 2012.

== History ==
Toolbox.com was founded in 1998 as ITtoolbox, one of the first online communities enabling professionals to share knowledge about information technology. Co-founder Daniel Morrison justified the need for ITtoolbox, saying that the site "helps professionals do their job better by tapping each other for insight and help."

In 2007, ITtoolbox was acquired by The Corporate Executive Board Company, with Daniel Morrison retaining a managing role in the site. Following the acquisition, ITtoolbox was renamed Toolbox for IT, the site as a whole was renamed Toolbox.com, and in November and December 2008 respectively, Toolbox.com officially launched two new communities for human resources and finance. Morrison considered the addition of a financial community to its network to be a key asset, especially due to the effects of the 2008 financial crisis

In 2012, Ziff Davis Media announced that it had acquired Toolbox.com for an unspecified amount. The company will incorporate Toolbox.com into its B2B operations, B2B Focus, which was formed by its acquisition of Focus Research.
