= Eric Maisel =

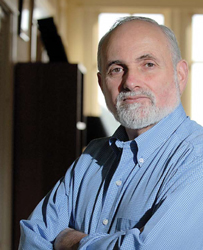
- Born: January 14, 1947 (age 79); Bronx, New York, US
- Education: San Francisco State University, Oregon State University, University of Oregon
- Occupations: Teacher, author, coach

Eric Maisel (born 1947) is an American psychotherapist, teacher, coach, author and atheist. His books include Fearless Creating (1995), The Van Gogh Blues (2002), Coaching the Artist Within (2005), and The Atheist's Way (2009).

== Biography ==
Eric Maisel was born in the Bronx, and grew up in Brooklyn.

Maisel is a columnist for Professional Artist magazine and a featured contributor to Psychology Today. His books include "Rethinking Depression," “Mastering Creative Anxiety," "Creative Recovery," "A Writer’s San Francisco," and "A Writer’s Paris". He lives in the San Francisco Bay Area with his family.

Maisel is the author of more than 40 books and a creativity coach. He trains creativity coaches and provides training for the Creativity Coaching Association.

== Creativity coaching ==
In the early 1990s, Maisel developed the coaching specialty of creativity coaching. Creativity coaching focuses on helping creative and performing artists meet their emotional and practical challenges.

In his 2005 book Coaching the Artist Within, Maisel presents anecdotal case studies of his creativity coaching work with creative and performing artists and presents lessons of importance to artists, among them "creating in the middle of things," “upholding dreams and testing reality," “committing to goal-oriented process," and "maintaining a creative life."

== Mental health ==
In his 2012 book Rethinking Depression: How to Shed Mental Health Labels and Create Personal Meaning, Maisel rejects the idea that a case has been made for the existence of the “mental disorder of depression,” given the weakness of the construct “mental disorder,” the insufficiency of diagnosing on the basis of symptom pictures alone, and the reasonableness of supposing that what we are seeing is profound sadness instead; and presents an “updated existential program” for dealing with "profound sadness".

== Atheism ==
A lifelong atheist, Maisel described in his 2009 book The Atheist's Way: Living Well Without Gods how individuals can negotiate the paradigm shift from seeking meaning (in religion, spiritual pursuits, or anywhere else) to making meaning.

== Books ==
- Dismay Maya Press, 1982
- The Blackbirds of Mulhouse Maya Press, 1984
- The Fretful Dancer Aegina Press, 1988
- Staying Sane in the Arts Tarcher/Penguin, 1992
- Artists Speak Harper San Francisco, 1993
- Fearless Creating Tarcher/Penguin, 1995
- Affirmations for Artists Tarcher/Penguin, 1996
- Living the Writer's Life Watson-Guptill, 1999
- Deep Writing Tarcher/Penguin, 1999
- The Creativity Book Tarcher/Penguin, 2000
- 20 Communication Tips for Families New World Library, 2000
- Sleep Thinking Adams Media, 2000
- 20 Communication Tips at Work New World Library, 2001
- The Van Gogh Blues Rodale, 2002
- Write Mind Tarcher/Penguin, 2002
- The Art of the Book Proposal Tarcher/Penguin 2004
- Writers and Artists on Love New World Library, 2004
- Writers and Artists on Devotion New World Library, 2004
- Performance Anxiety Back Stage Books, 2005
- Coaching the Artist Within New World Library, 2005
- A Writer's Paris Writer's Digest Books, 2005
- A Writer's San Francisco New World Library, 2006
- What Would your Character do? Writer's Digest Books, 2006*Toxic Criticism McGraw-Hill, 2007
- Ten Zen Seconds Sourcebooks, 2007
- Creativity for Life New World Library, 2007
- Everyday You Conari, 2007
- Creative Recovery Shambhala Publications, 2008
- A Writer's Space Adam's Media, 2009
- Maisel, Eric (2009). The Atheist's Way: Living Well Without Gods. New World Library. p. 200. ISBN 978-1577316428.
- Maisel, Eric (2010). Brainstorm: Harnessing the Power of Productive Obsessions. New World Library. p. 216. ISBN 978-1577316213.
- Murder in Berlin Singingwood Press, 2011
- Become a Creativity Coach Now Singingwood Press, 2011
- Maisel, Eric (2011). Mastering Creative Anxiety. New World Library. p. 272. ISBN 978-1577319320.
- Maisel, Eric (2012). Rethinking Depression. New World Library. pp. 248. ISBN 978-1608680207.
