= Windows Sources =

Defunct computer periodical

Windows Sources was a magazine by ZDNet. It focused on product reviews rather than 'how to,' and it lasted from 1993 – c. 2001.

In 1997 Ziff-Davis Inc. appointed Frank Quigley as the publisher of the magazine. The magazine was later renamed Windows Pro. The headquarters was in New York City. Patrick Norton ran the hardware reviews section. Carlos Carrillo was the Assistant Editor and ran the shareware reviews section.

== History ==
In 1993, the same year that Windows Sources began, its parent company, Ziff-Davis also acquired a pair of magazines: one focused on "on computer video games" and the other "directed at parents of children who are computer users." Neither of these nor Windows Sources were among Ziff Davis's top three earners.

In 1996, when Ziff made available online "11,000 reviews from the last 18 months of Ziff-Davis magazines" Windows Sources was one of the top 3 in what was searchable. In 1997 they published "Microsoft Word 97 for Windows Superguide."
