= RootMetrics =

Mobile network metrics company

- Type: Subsidiary
- Industry: Wireless, Technology, Mobile, Telecom
- Founded: 2008
- Founders: Ron Dicklin; Paul Griff; Jason Browne; Andy Hollenbeck
- Headquarters: Bellevue, Washington, United States
- Area served: United States, United Kingdom
- Products: RootScore Reports; CoverageMap and CoverageMap Mobile App
- Parent: Ookla (Ziff Davis)
- Website: www.rootmetrics.com

RootMetrics (formerly Root Wireless) offers scientifically collected and crowdsourced mobile network performance information to consumers and the industry. The firm captures user information by testing network performance when consumers are using their mobile phone for voice or data communications.

RootMetrics was acquired by analytics firm IHS Inc. in 2015.

On December 14, 2021, RootMetrics was acquired by the Seattle-based internet performance analyzer Ookla.

== Products and services ==
=== RootScore Reports ===
RootScore Reports provide mobile network comparison information based on the company’s testing. In the United States, the firm publishes reports for the U.S. as a whole, the 50 U.S. states, the 125 most populous U.S. cities, and the 50 busiest U.S. airports. In the UK, RootMetrics publishes RootScore Reports for the four UK nations, 16 most populous metropolitan areas, and three London airports (Heathrow, Gatwick, and City).

The reports show network reliability and speed using two indexes: Network Reliability and Network Speed. The Network Reliability Index is made up of results from data/mobile internet, call, and text testing; the Network Speed Index is compiled from data/mobile internet and text results.

- National RootScore Reports (U.S., UK, Canada) - The firm publishes National RootScore Reports twice a year for the U.S., UK, and Canada as a whole.
- State/Nations RootScore Reports (U.S., UK) - RootMetrics publishes RootScore Reports twice a year for the 50 U.S. States and the four UK nations of England, Northern Ireland, Scotland, and Wales.
- Metro RootScore Reports (U.S., UK, Canada) - Metro RootScore Reports compile data on the major networks’ mobile performance within the 125 most populous U.S. metropolitan markets, the 16 most populous UK Larger Urban Zones (LUZs), and the six most populated Canadian metropolitan areas.
- Airport RootScore Reports (U.S., UK) - The firm tests mobile network data performance at the 50 busiest U.S. airports (as designated by the FAA) plus Heathrow, Gatwick, and City airports in the UK, measuring the network data performance of major operators on a typical day. The data collection is conducted in publicly accessible areas, including common areas such as check-in, baggage claim, and various terminals. Test cover typical travel days, avoiding major holidays.

=== CoverageMap ===
The RootMetrics CoverageMap combines the company's scientifically-collected results with results crowdsourced from consumers. It is available both online and within the company’s mobile app for Android and iOS. It displays call performance, average call signal strength, download data speeds, and types of network technology available.

== Testing methodology ==
Tests are conducted with unmodified Android-based smartphones purchased off the shelf at regular mobile phone stores. The company tests mobile networks at various locations and hours, both indoors and outdoors, and while driving, using a random sampling methodology to prevent bias.

Test locations are randomly selected in each state and each nation, and divided into groups by population size, with each population-based group given equal weighting.

Complementing its professional testing, the firm also gathers crowdsourced network performance data from mobile users, combining them to produce the CoverageMap comparison tool, available both online and within the mobile application.

== RootScore Awards ==
RootScore Awards are assigned to the networks with the top score in data/mobile internet performance, call performance, text performance, and overall performance incorporating the three categories. For airports the awards are based on the data/mobile internet performance.
