= Microsystems (magazine) =

Personal computing magazine

- Editor: Mark Rollins
- Former editors: Sol Libes
- Categories: Personal computing
- Frequency: Bi-monthly 1980-1982; monthly 1983-1984
- Total circulation: 55,000 (1984)
- First issue: January 1980
- Final issue Number: November 1984; Vol 5 No 11
- Company: Ziff-Davis
- Country: United States of America
- Based in: Springfield, New Jersey
- Language: English
- ISSN: 0199-7955

Microsystems was a personal computing magazine founded by Sol Libes and published from January 1980 to November 1984. Oriented toward the home and business personal computer user, it included an editorial page, letters from readers, technical articles, and advertisements. As a historical reference, it is notable for chronicling in detail the early days of the personal computer. Topics covered in its issues included:

- IEEE-696 / S-100 bus systems
- the CP/M operating systems from Digital Research: CP/M-80, CP/M Plus, CP/M-86, and MP/M
- the MS-DOS operating system from Microsoft
- implementations of the PL/I language: PL/I-80 and PL/I-86 from Digital Research
- the Turbo Pascal and UCSD Pascal languages
- the 8080, Z80, 8086, and 80286 microprocessors

== History ==
As the nascent personal computer industry grew, the magazine changed as well. The front cover of the magazine adopted various titles throughout its history:

- S-100 MICROSYSTEMS
- MICROSYSTEMS - the CP/M and S-100 user's journal
- Microsystems - the CP/M user's journal
- Microsystems - the journal for advanced microcomputing

In 1983, Ziff-Davis took over publication of the magazine, but decided in September 1984 to stop publication, citing "poor circulation and lack of substantial growth potential". The circulation at that time was about 55,000.

Sol Libes resumed publication of the magazine under a new title in March 1985, as Micro/Systems Journal (ISSN 8750-9482) "for the Advanced Computer User".
