= Everyday Health =

American online publication

- Type: Subsidiary
- Industry: Healthcare
- Founded: 2002
- Headquarters: New York City, U.S.
- Owner: Ziff Davis
- Website: www.everydayhealth.com

Everyday Health is an American online publication focused on health news and information that is medically reviewed by physicians and healthcare professionals. It was initially founded under the name Agora Media in 2002. It is a subsidiary of the Everyday Health Group a division of Ziff Davis, an American digital media and internet company.

== History ==
Everyday Health was founded as Agora Media in 2002. It merged with Streetmail.com to form Waterfront Media in 2008. The website EverydayHealth.com was first published under Waterfront Media. The website’s parent company was renamed Everyday Health to reflect the publication’s name in 2010.

In 2011, Everyday Health was one of the brands that received its own television channel as part of the YouTube Original Channel Initiative. Its Everyday Health program was nominated for a Daytime Emmy Awards in 2012.

In 2021, Everyday Health received one of the Webby Awards for Best Website and Mobile Site in the Health and Wellness category. In the same year, Everyday Health received a Gold Award for Digital Health - Social Media (Instagram) at the Digital Health Awards.

Everyday Health Group also has partnerships with the brands Mayo Clinic and Cleveland Clinic. It represents advertising for the Mayo Clinic, named the top hospital in the world in 2025 by Newsweek. Cleveland Clinic is also one of its brands.

Everyday Health has partnered with the clinical trial-based platform TrialReach to match potential participants to clinical trials.

== Overview ==
Everyday Health publishes evidence-based health and medical articles on topics such as disease symptoms, mental health, nutrition, fitness, and skincare. The site’s mission is to "inspire and empower people to live their healthiest lives” by delivering accurate, credible, and trustworthy information.

All editorial content published by Everyday Health is created and reviewed according to rigorous standards for accuracy, balance, and objectivity. Articles are written by experienced health journalists, healthcare professionals, and patient advocates, and are either medically reviewed or fact-checked before publication.

Content is reviewed by Everyday Health’s Health Expert Network, which consists of more than 100 board-certified physicians, patient advocates, medical and wellness experts, and other health professionals across over 30 medical specializations. Their review ensures all reporting has the most up-to-date information and is medically and pharmacologically accurate.

The publication also relies on and cites authoritative primary sources — including peer-reviewed studies in academic journals, interviews with board-certified experts, advocacy organizations, and health websites of leading research institutions and government organizations — to ensure that all health information is current and reliable.

The website also publishes content written by medical industry professionals. Everyday Health also has a library of video content on medical topics. All content on the website is also reviewed by active physicians and healthcare professionals.

The publication has also released 23 mobile apps in categories such as health, pregnancy, beauty, fitness, and nutrition. It has released two fitness apps featuring Jillian Michaels and Denise Austin.

Everyday Health also includes online tools such as a symptom checker, a meal planner, and information on drugs and supplements. Everyday Health includes online tools such as a symptom checker; calculators for hydration, weight loss, and protein consumption; and Tippi, a community-based resource where patients and healthcare professionals share tips and advice on a range of topics.

Alongside its range of quizzes, calculators, and community-sourced tips, resources include a Vaccine Planner tool and Find a Doctor portal, which identifies health professionals based on location, condition, and insurance type.

Everyday Health provides comprehensive reviews of diet and nutrition products, mental health services, medical products, and more. Subject matter specialists from the Health Expert Network review all product-review content.

Everyday Health also has a library of video content on medical topics.

== Awards and accolades ==
- 2021 - Winner of several awards from Digital Health Awards
- 2021 - Webby Awards, Best Website and Mobile Site
- 2024 - Davey Awards, won 2 awards, Silver place for General-Diversity, Equity & Inclusion and Silver place for General-Health & Health Services
- 2024- Medical Marketing and Media Awards, Silver place for Healthcare Consumer Media Brand

== See also ==
- DailyStrength
