= ExtremeTech =

Technology news website

- Website type: Weblog
- Owner: Ziff Davis Media
- Creators: Bill Machrone and Nick Stam
- Editor: Joel Hruska
- Website: ExtremeTech.com
- Commercial: Yes
- Launched: June 12, 2001
- Current status: Online

The spring 2005 edition of ExtremeTech magazine

ExtremeTech is a technology weblog, launched in June 2001, which focuses on hardware, computer software, science, and other technologies. Between 2003 and 2005, ExtremeTech was also a print magazine and the publisher of a popular series of how-to and do-it-yourself books.

== Background ==
ExtremeTech was launched as a website in June 2001, with co-founder Bill Machrone as Editor-in-Chief, and fellow co-founder Nick Stam as Senior Technical Director. Loyd Case, Dave Salvator, Mark Hachman, and Jim Lynch were other original core ET staff. In 2002 Jim Louderback became the Editor-in-Chief. When initially launched, ExtremeTech covered a broad range of technical topics with very in-depth technical stories. Topic areas included core PC techniques (CPUs/GPUs), networking, operating systems, software development, display technology, printers, scanners, etc.

By 2003, Ziff Davis management wanted to reduce expenses and cut back content to core PC tech areas, focusing on how to build and optimize PCs. Loyd Case took over as Editor-in-Chief, and Jason Cross joined as a technology analyst. In mid-2009, due to sinking corporate-level finances, Ziff Davis laid off most of the core team, and Jeremy Kaplan (Executive Editor of PC Magazine and EIC of ExtremeTech Magazine) tried to keep the online site going, but it was quite challenging without much dedicated staff. Similarly, Matthew Murray (currently Editor of PC Magazine's Digital Edition) tried to keep things alive. As described below in the Shutdown and Relaunch section in April 2011, Ziff Davis management reinvested in ExtremeTech, and the site was relaunched under Managing Editor Sal Cangeloso and Senior Editor Sebastian Anthony.

== ExtremeTech Magazine ==
The magazine was first published in fall 2004 (Volume 1, Issue 1). The first issue noted different staff members for the website and magazine. Staff included Editor-in-Chief Michael J. Miller, Editor Jeremy Kaplan, Technical Director Loyd Case, Senior Technical Analyst Dave Salvator, and others. Subsequent issues were published in winter 2004 (Volume 1, Issue 2), spring 2005 (Volume 1, Issue 3), summer 2005 (Volume 1, Issue 4), with the magazine ending its run in fall 2005 (Volume 1, Issue 5).

== Shutdown and relaunch ==
The site ceased updating daily on June 26, 2009 due to most of its core staff members being laid off. On April 26, 2011 it was announced that a relaunch was slated for late spring. The announcement noted that along with a complete visual redesign, ExtremeTech would be "widening its scope" to cover new topics that didn't exist when the site was first conceived in 2001. Sebastian Anthony, previously an editor at AOL's Download Squad software weblog, led the editorial side of the relaunch.

== Writers ==
ExtremeTech is currently managed by Joel Hruska, who also served as the site's lead writer from 2015 to 2021. Previously, it was managed by Jamie Lendino, who came from PCMag.com and had written for ExtremeTech from 2005-2010. He was formerly the editor-in-chief of Smart Device Central. Other writers include David Cardinal, Jessica Hall, Adrianna Nine, Josh Norem, and Ryan Whitwam.

== Former editors ==
Sebastian Anthony, who led the editorial side of ExtremeTech's relaunch in 2011, left at the end of 2014 to launch Ars Technica in the UK.
