= Downdetector =

Website that reports on website outages

- Owner: Ookla
- Website: downdetector.com
- Launched: April 2012; 14 years ago
- Current status: Online

Downdetector is an online platform founded by Tom Sanders and Sander van de Graaf that provides users with real-time information about the status of a limited few websites and services.

The information that is provided by the site is based upon crowdsourcing user outage reports, which are collected from various sources, including the page for each website on Downdetector itself and Twitter. A map is also shown with the locations of the outage reports, and a list of cities with the corresponding number of reports is shown above the map. Downdetector is available in 45 countries, with a different site for each country. Downdetector tracks over 12,000 services internationally.

== History ==
Downdetector was founded in April 2012 by Tom Sanders and Sander van de Graaf and was acquired by Ookla, the company behind Speedtest.net, in August 2018. In March 2026, Accenture acquired Downdetector.

Dhruv Arora, a Senior Director of Engineering at Ookla, described Downdetector as having a "team size in the double digits" in 2025.
