= QuinStreet =

American marketing company

QuinStreet, Inc.
- Type: Public
- Traded as: Nasdaq: QNST; S&P 600 component
- Industry: Performance marketing, media online
- Founded: 1999; 27 years ago
- Founder: Doug Valenti
- Headquarters: Foster City, California, U.S.
- Key people: Doug Valenti (CEO); Nina Bhanap (president and CTO)
- Revenue: ▲US$1.094 billion (2025) (2026)
- Net income: ▲US$81.2 million (2026)
- Number of employees: 938 (2025)
- Website: www.quinstreet.com

QuinStreet, Inc. is a publicly traded online marketing company based in Foster City, California. The company helps generate web traffic for clients through consumer websites, including media, in the home and financial services sector.

The company was founded in 1999, and was publicly listed in 2010.

== History ==
QuinStreet was formed in 1999 by Doug Valenti (chairman and CEO). Bronwyn Syiek, another founding team member, was president and COO. The company was first profitable in 2002 with revenues of $13 million; by April 2009, QuinStreet reported $300 million in annual revenues and approximately 450 employees.

QuinStreet Inc. acquired U.S. Citizens for Fair Credit Card Terms, Inc, which operated the CardRatings.com website in August 2008 for an initial cash payment of $10.4 million.

In the beginning of August 2009, QuinStreet Inc. used some of its cash reserves to acquire the Internet.com division of WebMediaBrands Inc. for $18 million.

In September 2009, QuinStreet purchased Insure.com for $16 million. The company's other financial-services properties include MoneyRates.com, Get Rich Slowly, ConsumerismCommentary.com and HSH.com.

An initial public offering on February 11, 2010, raised $150 million, with the shares listed on Nasdaq under the symbol QNST.

In September 2011, QuinStreet acquired the IT Business Edge (ITBE) network of web publications.

In June 2012, the company was under investigation by the Attorneys General's offices of 15 separate US states, led by the Attorney General of Kentucky, Jack Conway. The company was accused of targeting military veterans with deceptive recruiting practices for its for-profit school clients. The company agreed to pay a $2.5 million fine and relinquish the website GIBill.com.

In February 2012, the company acquired the media assets of Ziff Davis "Enterprise", which included eWeek.com, CIOInsight.com, Baseline.com, ChannelInsider.com and WebBuyersGuide.com, and others.

In 2018, the company acquired AmOne, an online marketing company. In 2019, Quinstreet acquired CloudControlMedia, LLC and MyBankTracker.com, LLC.

In 2020, QuinStreet sold its B2B tech publications to TechnologyAdvice. QuinStreet divested their education media, client and campaign assets on August 31, 2020.

In 2020, QuinStreet acquired the home improvement marketing company, Modernize. In 2026, QuinStreet acquired HomeBuddy for $179.7 million.

== Business ==
Quinstreet's education clients have included Art Institutes, DeVry University, Kaplan University, University of Phoenix, Westwood, and other for-profit colleges.
