= Spiceworks =

Information technology network

- Logo

- SpiceWorks 5.0 on the "Dashboard" screen
- Type: Subsidiary
- Industry: Computer software
- Founded: 2006
- Founder: Scott Abel, Jay Hallberg, Greg Kattawar, Francis Sullivan
- Headquarters: Austin, Texas, United States
- Products: Spiceworks Cloud Help Desk
- Parent: Ziff Davis (since 2019)
- Website: www.spiceworks.com

Spiceworks is a professional network for the information technology (IT) industry that is headquartered in Austin, Texas. The company was founded in January 2006 by Scott Abel, Jay Hallberg, Greg Kattawar, and Francis Sullivan to build IT management software. Since 2019 it has been owned by Ziff Davis.

Spiceworks is an online community where users can collaborate and seek advice from one another, and also engage in a marketplace to purchase IT-related services and products. In 2014 the network was estimated to be used by more than six million IT professionals and 3,000 technology vendors.

The company's original free proprietary software was written in Ruby on Rails, and ran exclusively on Microsoft Windows. The software discovered IP-addressable devices and included help desk functionality and an integrated knowledge base. The desktop application was retired in 2021 in favor of a cloud-based help desk.

== History ==
The company was formed in January 2006 by Scott Abel, Jay Hallberg, Greg Kattawar and Francis Sullivan, former executives at Motive. The company received $5 million in series A funding from Austin Ventures in June 2006. Spiceworks' series B funding round was completed in August 2007 and included $8 million from Shasta Ventures and Austin Ventures. The company's $18 million series C funding round in January 2010 was headed by Institutional Venture Partners. In April 2011, Spiceworks received $25 million in series D funding from Adams Street Partners and Tenaya Capital and a 2014 series E financing round worth $57 million led by Goldman Sachs. In 2012, it opened its European headquarters in London, England. The company celebrated its tenth anniversary in January 2016 and announced plans to add 100 additional employees during the year. However, those plans were changed and in June 2016 the company announced that it was laying off approximately 12 percent of its workforce. In addition to the layoffs, several employees in leadership positions at Spiceworks left the company to join former CEO Scott Abel in founding a new startup, Resly Labs. Resly Labs later changed their name to Umuse. Ziff Davis acquired Spiceworks in September 2019.

== Software ==
In July 2006, it released a public beta. The 1.0 version of Spiceworks was released in November 2006. It focused on simplifying the process of taking inventory, monitoring networks, and generating reports for IT professionals at small and medium-sized businesses. By the end of its first year, Spiceworks had 120,000 users.

The company released the 2.0 version of its software in December 2007. Subsequent versions followed, leading up to version 7.0 in 2013. The company released a free network monitor product in December 2014.

In June 2021, Spiceworks Desktop 7.5, became unavailable for download, and at the end of the year, end of life. The company released Cloud Help Desk solution.

== Business model ==
Spiceworks offers its professional network and software free to users. The company generates most of its revenue through the sale of ads displayed on its network. A small percentage of its revenue is generated through purchases of IT products and services made through the Spiceworks platform.

== Corporate identity ==
The official mascot for Spicework is "SpiceRex." SpiceRex is an orange Tyrannosaurus rex. The creation was a result of Spiceworks community member, IT pro, and blogger Andy "akp982" Phelps.

== Spiceworld ==
=== Austin ===
Spiceworks has hosted SpiceWorld, a conference for its users, every year since 2008. The conference was originally held at the Alamo Drafthouse movie theater. The conference later moved to the AT&T Executive Education & Conference Center at the University of Texas. Starting with SpiceWorld 2013 and on, the conferences have been held at the Austin Convention Center.

=== London ===
Spiceworks opened up a London office in 2012. The first SpiceWorld London took place in May 2012 in Vinopolis in London's Bankside.

=== Spiceworld 2020 ===
Spiceworld hosted its first virtual event in the year 2020 to overcome the pandemic challenge. This is well received by the overall IT community where they participated and engaged well. Spiceworld 2020 had more than 3000 participants. This was held from 15 September to 17 September.

=== Spiceworld 2021 ===
Due to pandemic Spiceworld was conducted online. The key-note speaker for Spiceworld 2021 was Steve Wozniak. This annual event was conducted from September 27 to 29, 2021.

== Awards and recognition ==
- 2007 – PC Magazine's Editors' Choice award
- 2007 – IT Solution of the Year by InnoTech Conference
- 2009 – Spiceworks named InformationWeek Startup 50 Company.
- 2009 – Spiceworks named "Top 10 B-to-B Web Site" by BtoB Magazine
- 2010 – Spiceworks wins PCMag.com Best of 2010 Award
- 2010 – Spiceworks wins six Windows IT Pro Editors’ Best and Community Choice Awards

== See also ==
- Comparison of help desk issue tracking software
- Comparison of network monitoring systems
- System administration
