= Ziff Davis =

American publisher and Internet company

Ziff Davis, Inc.
- Formerly: J2 Global, Inc.
- Type: Public
- Traded as: Nasdaq: ZD; S&P 600 component
- Industry: Digital media and Internet
- Predecessor: J2 Global, Inc.
- Founded: August 1927; 99 years ago in Chicago, Illinois, U.S.
- Founders: William Bernard Ziff Sr. Bernard George Davis
- Headquarters: New York City, U.S.
- Key people: Vivek R. Shah (CEO); Bret Richter (CFO)
- Products: Multimedia, software, video games, data licensing
- Revenue: ▲US$1.45 billion (2025)
- Net income: ▼US$47.4 million (2025)
- Total assets: ▲US$3.7 billion (2024)
- Total equity: ▼US$1.8 billion (2024)
- Number of employees: 3,800 (2024)
- Website: ziffdavis.com

Ziff Davis, Inc. is an American digital media and Internet company. Founded in 1927 by William Bernard Ziff Sr. and Bernard George Davis, the company primarily owns technology- and health-oriented media websites, online shopping-related services, Internet connectivity services, gaming and entertainment brands, and cybersecurity and martech (marketing technology) tools. Previously, the company was predominantly a publisher of hobbyist magazines.

== History ==
=== Popular Aviation ===
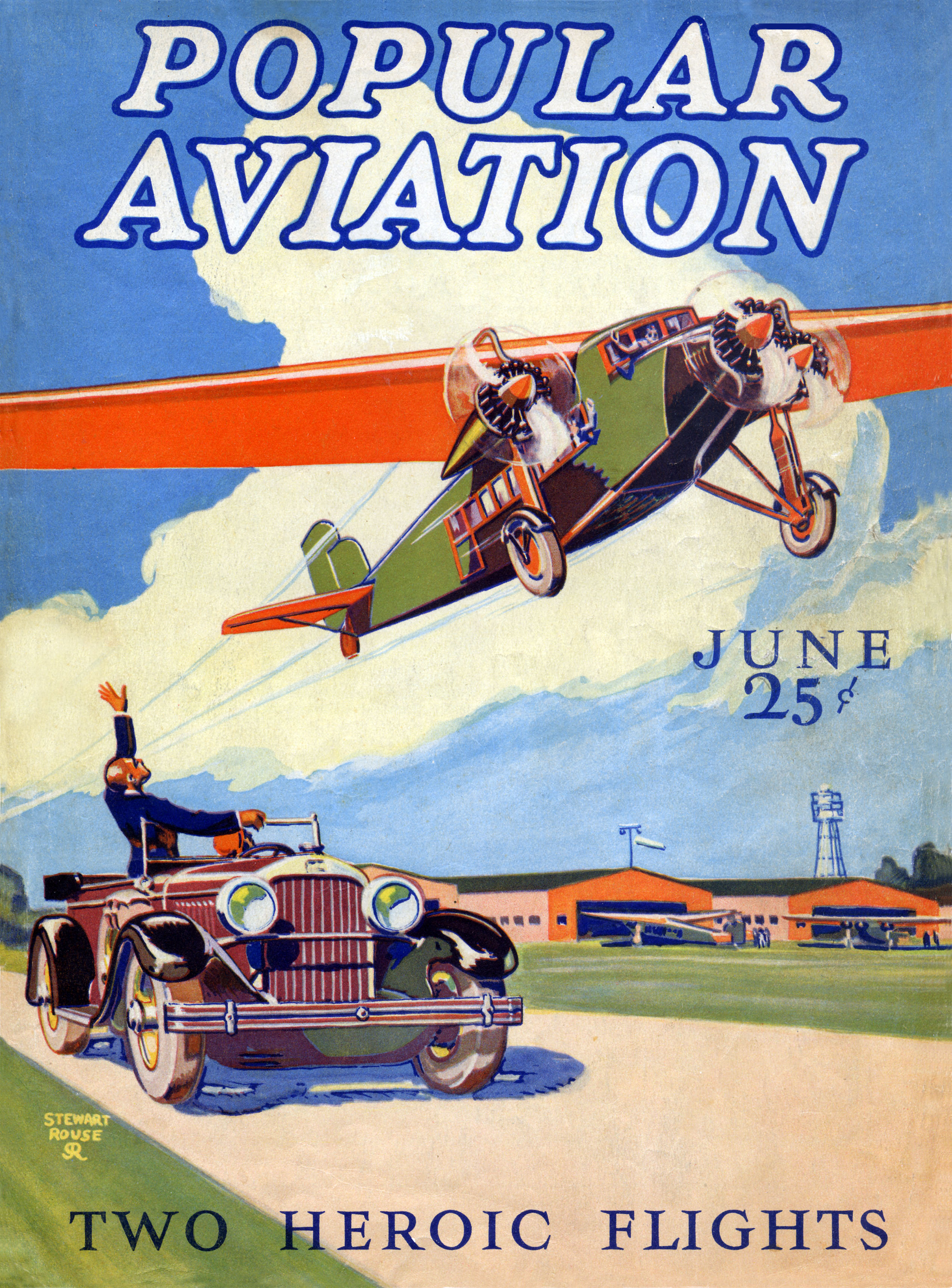
An early (June 1928) issue of Popular Aviation; the first magazine published by Ziff Davis. Artwork by Stewart Rouse. Ziff-Davis titles featured painted covers throughout the following decade.

The William B. Ziff Company, founded in 1920, was a Chicago advertising agency that secured advertising from national companies such as Procter & Gamble for many African American weekly newspapers. In 1923, Ziff acquired E. C. Auld Company, a Chicago publishing house. Ziff's first venture in magazine publishing was Ziff's Magazine, which featured short stories, one-act plays, humorous verse, and jokes. The title was changed to America's Humor in April 1926.

Bernard George Davis was the student editor of the University of Pittsburgh's humor magazine, the Pitt Panther, and was active in the Association of College Comics of the East. During his senior year he attended the association's convention and met William B. Ziff. When Davis graduated in 1927 he joined Ziff as the editor of America's Humor.

Ziff, who had been an aviator in World War I, created Popular Aviation in August 1927. It was published by Popular Aviation Publishing Company of Chicago, Illinois. Under editor Harley W. Mitchell it became the largest aviation magazine, with a circulation of 100,000 in 1929. The magazine's title became Aeronautics in June 1929 and the publishing company's name became Aeronautical Publications, Inc. The title was changed back to Popular Aviation in July 1930. The magazine became Flying in 1942 and is still published today by Firecrown. The magazine celebrated its 90th anniversary in 2017.

The company histories normally give the founding date as 1927. This is when B.G. Davis joined and Popular Aviation magazine started. However, it was not until 1936 that the company became the "Ziff-Davis Publishing Company". (Popular Aviation, April 1936, was the first issue by Ziff-Davis Publishing.) Davis was given a substantial minority equity interest in the company and was appointed a vice-president and director. He was later named president in 1946. Davis was a photography enthusiast and the editor of the Popular Photography magazine started in May 1937.

=== Fiction, hobbyist and bridal magazines ===
In early 1938, Ziff-Davis acquired the magazines Radio News and Amazing Stories. These were started by Hugo Gernsback but sold as a result of the Experimenter Publishing bankruptcy in 1929. Both magazines had declined since the bankruptcy but the resources of Ziff-Davis rejuvenated them starting with the April 1938 issues. Radio News was published until 1972. The magazine Popular Electronics, derived from Radio News, was begun in 1955 and published until 1985. Amazing Stories was a leading science fiction magazine and Ziff Davis soon added a new companion, Fantastic Adventures (FA). In 1954 FA was merged into the newer magazine Fantastic, founded in 1952 to great initial success. ZD published a number of other pulp magazines and, later, digest-sized fiction magazines during the 1940s and 1950s, and continued to publish Amazing and Fantastic until 1965.

Ziff-Davis published comic books during the early 1950s, operating by their own name and also the name Approved Comics. Eschewing superheroes, they published horror, crime, sports, romance, and Western comics, though most titles did not last more than a few issues. Superman co-creator Jerry Siegel was the art director of the comics line; other notable creators who worked for Ziff-Davis Comics included John Buscema, Sid Greene, Bob Haney, Sam Kweskin, Rudy Lapick, Richard Lazarus, Mort Leav, Paul S. Newman, George Roussos, Mike Sekowsky, Ernie Schroeder, and Ogden Whitney. In 1953, the company mostly abandoned comics, selling its most popular titles—the romance comics Cinderella Love and Romantic Love, the Western Kid Cowboy, and the jungle adventure Wild Boy of the Congo—to St. John Publications. Ziff-Davis continued to publish one title, G.I. Joe, until 1957, a total of 51 issues.

Logo until 2021

Upon Bill Ziff's death in 1953, William B. Ziff Jr., his son, returned from Germany to lead the company. In 1958, Bernard Davis sold Ziff Jr. his share of Ziff Davis to found Davis Publications, Inc.; Ziff Davis continued to use the Davis surname as Ziff-Davis.

From 1958, under the direction of sole owner Bill Ziff Jr., a polymath with a photographic memory, Ziff-Davis became a successful publisher of enthusiast magazines, purchasing titles like Car and Driver, and tailoring content for enthusiasts as well as purchasing agents ("brand specifiers"); the company was able to attract advertising money that other, general-interest publications were losing.

In 1958, Ziff-Davis began publishing a magazine, HiFi and Music Review, for the growing hobby of high fidelity equipment. Ultimately, the magazine evolved into Stereo Review. ZD also became a prolific publisher of photography and boating magazines during this period, and such magazines as Modern Bride; after the sale of Fantastic and Amazing in 1965, their editor Cele Goldsmith Lalli began working on the bridal magazines, becoming a notable and influential editor in that field before retirement.

During the 1970s and 1980s, the company's success increased with this strategy, and a rapidly expanding interest in electronics and computing. With titles such as PC Magazine, Popular Electronics, and Computer Shopper, Ziff Davis became the leading technology magazine business.

Ziff Davis sold the majority of its consumer magazines to CBS and its trade magazines to News Corporation in 1984, keeping its computer magazines.

=== Television stations ===
In 1979, Ziff Davis expanded into broadcasting, after an acquisition of television stations originally owned by greeting card company Rust Craft. Ziff Davis's stations included NBC affiliates WROC-TV in Rochester, New York, and WRCB-TV in Chattanooga, Tennessee, CBS affiliates WEYI-TV in Saginaw, Michigan, WRDW-TV in Augusta, Georgia, and WSTV-TV in Steubenville, Ohio (which changed its name to WTOV-TV and its network affiliation to NBC after Ziff Davis assumed control of the station), and ABC affiliate WJKS-TV in Jacksonville, Florida (which would also switch to NBC soon after its acquisition was finalized). These stations would be sold to other owners by the mid-1980s—most of these would become owned by a new ownership group, "Television Station Partners", the exceptions being WRCB (which would be sold to Sarkes Tarzian) and WJKS (which was acquired by Media General).

| City of license / Market | Station | Channel | Years owned | Current status |
|---|---|---|---|---|
| Jacksonville, FL | WJKS-TV | 17 | 1979–1982 | The CW affiliate WCWJ, owned by Graham Media Group |
| Augusta, GA | WRDW-TV | 12 | 1979–1983 | CBS affiliate owned by Gray Television |
| Saginaw–Flint, MI | WEYI-TV | 25 | 1979–1983 | NBC affiliate owned by Howard Stirk Holdings (Note: Operated by Sinclair Broadcast Group.) |
| Rochester, NY | WROC-TV | 8 | 1979–1983 | CBS affiliate owned by Nexstar Media Group |
| Steubenville, OH–Wheeling, WV | WTOV-TV | 9 | 1979–1983 | NBC affiliate owned by Sinclair Broadcast Group |
| Chattanooga, TN | WRCB-TV | 3 | 1979–1982 | NBC affiliate owned by Sarkes Tarzian, Inc. |

=== Technology magazines and web properties ===
Ziff Davis first started technology-themed publications during 1954, with Popular Electronics and, more briefly, Electronics World. This resulted more or less directly in its interest in home-computer magazines. From that time, Ziff Davis became a major publisher of computer and Internet-related publishing. It acquired PC Magazine in 1982, and the trade journal MacWEEK in 1988. In 1991, the company initiated ZiffNet, a subscription service that offered computing information to users of CompuServe. This grew into the news website ZDNet, launched in late 1994. In 1995 it initiated the magazine Yahoo! Internet Life, initially as ZD Internet Life. The magazine was meant to accompany and complement the site Yahoo!.

On August 20, 1994, Ziff-Davis entered the television industry with the premiere of The Personal Computing Show, a program that aired on Saturday mornings on CNBC, America's Talking and the Jones Computing Network. The Personal Computing Show, co-hosted by Jim Louderback and Gina Smith, targeted a growing demographic of personal computer owners and demonstrated how to purchase, install, maintain and repair personal computers and peripheral devices such as printers. Shortly after The Personal Computing Show's premiere, Ziff-Davis revealed plans to produce a second show in October 1994 named PC Update, a half-hour Sunday morning news program hosted by Leo Laporte and focusing on the computer industry. According to Ziff-Davis spokesman Gregory Jarboe, The Personal Computing Show was unsuccessful due to its relegation to odd channels and timeslots.

Owner William Bernard Ziff Jr. had wanted to give the business to his sons—Daniel, Dirk and Robert—but they did not want the responsibility. In October 1994, he announced the sale of the publishing group to Forstmann Little & Company for US$1.4 billion. A small Foster City-based television operation named "ZD-TV" was listed as a company asset. Ziff-Davis was then sold to SoftBank a year later.

In April 1996, Ziff-Davis announced the establishment of ZDTV as a San Francisco-based unit specializing in the production of television and internet broadcasts, which would allow the publisher to showcase its products. Its first project was to develop The Site, a daily hour-long prime time news show co-hosted by Soledad O'Brien about the increasing social and economic effects of technology. The program aired on the cable news network MSNBC, which launched on July 15, 1996. It was the third San Francisco-based television program specializing in technology after CNET Central and Cyberlife. According to Ziff-Davis chief executive Larry Wangberg, San Francisco was chosen as ZDTV's headquarters for its proximity to Silicon Valley and easy access to Multimedia Gulch-based talent.

On May 6, 1997, Ziff-Davis announced its plan to launch ZDTV as a 24-hour interactive cable network specializing in computers and the internet. The publisher put $100 million (equivalent to $200.56 million in 2025) behind the project and planned to debut the ZDTV channel in early 1998. Projected programming for the channel included talk shows on the impact of technology, business-oriented shows evaluating investments in high-tech stocks, and reviews of software and hardware. Children's programming was also planned for the weekends. The channel had 11 initial charter advertisers, including IBM, Gateway 2000, Microsoft, and Charles Schwab. Ziff-Davis chairman and CEO Eric Hippeau cited the increasing presence of computers in cable television homes and workspaces as motivation for filling the niche of programming about computers, saying "This is a huge audience and it will only get bigger". Wangberg, who would be made the network's CEO, proclaimed Ziff-Davis's ambition of ZDTV becoming "to computing what CNN is to news, what ESPN is to sports". Although Ziff-Davis intended to continue producing The Site for MSNBC following ZDTV's launch, the show was canceled in September 1997 as a result of the network's shift toward an all-news format. In December 1997, Ziff-Davis revealed at the Western Cable Trade Show in Anaheim that it had secured agreements with four cable operators to carry the network: Prime Cable in Las Vegas, Harron Communications in Detroit, Televue in Georgia, and Prestige Cable in Georgia, North Carolina, Virginia, and Maryland.

Ziff-Davis's initial public offering was announced on February 18, 1998, delaying the launch of ZDTV. The network was separated from Ziff-Davis's publishing operations so as to prevent the former's start-up losses from impacting the latter's balance sheet. The network launched on May 11, 1998, on cable systems in Las Vegas, Detroit, parts of Georgia near Atlanta, and parts of Maine. In November, Microsoft co-founder Paul Allen's holding company Vulcan Ventures invested $54 million (equivalent to $106.67 million in 2025) in ZDTV, granting it a 33-percent stake in the network.

Although ZDTV was critically acclaimed, it struggled to gain a foothold on certain cable lineups, in part because Ziff-Davis eschewed the types of launch fees to cable operators—ranging from $100 to $150 million—that other new channels were providing. It strained to achieve carriage from AT&T/TCI cable lineups and was deemed unprofitable. In an effort to sell company assets to reduce debt and boost its share price, Ziff-Davis put ZDTV up for sale on July 16, 1999. On July 21, 1999, the company began trading on the New York Stock Exchange under the stock ticker "ZDZ". In November 1999, Vulcan purchased the remaining two-thirds of ZDTV's shares in a transaction that was completed on January 21, 2000. The deal (which permitted the network to retain its name) was worth $204.8 million (equivalent to $395.81 million in 2025).

On January 28, 2000, Ziff-Davis announced that it would sell its tradeshow unit, ZD Events, and eliminate its two tracking stocks as part of an effort to restructure the company. It also sold its magazine division to Willis Stein & Partners L.P. for $780 million. In July 2000, CNET Networks agreed to acquire Ziff-Davis Inc. for $1.6 billion in stock. The combined company was considered the eighth-largest internet company.

=== Ziff Davis Media Inc. ===
In 2001, the new company Ziff Davis Media Inc., a partnership of Willis Stein & Partners and James Dunning (former Ziff Davis CEO, chairman, and president), made an agreement with CNET Networks Inc. and ZDNet to acquire the URLs of Ziff Davis. Ziff Davis Media Inc. gained thereby the online content licensing rights to 11 publications, including PC Magazine, CIO Insight, and eWEEK, webpage of industry insider Spencer Katt.

Since 2004, Ziff Davis has annually hosted a trade show in New York City known as DigitalLife. DigitalLife showcases the newest technology in consumer electronics, gaming and entertainment. Unlike E3 (Electronic Entertainment Expo) or the Worldwide Developers Conference, DigitalLife is open to the public.

In November 2006, Ziff Davis announced the cancellation of Official PlayStation Magazine, which had begun in 1997. They cited a lack of interest in the magazine (and its demo disk) due to digital distribution.

In July 2007, Ziff Davis Media announced the sale of its enterprise (B2B or business-to-business) division to Insight Venture Partners. The sale included all B2B publications, which include eWeek, Baseline, and CIOinsight, and all related online properties. The enterprise division is now an independent company named Ziff Davis Enterprise Group (ZDE).

On March 5, 2008, Ziff Davis Media Inc. announced it had filed for Chapter 11 bankruptcy protection in order to restructure its debt and operations. and emerged, after a court supervised corporate restructuring in July 2009. In conjunction with this announcement they also stated that they are discontinuing their print copy of PC Magazine. According to BtoBonline, Ziff Davis Media made an agreement with an ad hoc group of noteholders, who will provide $24.5 million to fund the company's operations and help plan the restructuring.

On January 6, 2009, the company sold 1UP.com to Hearst's UGO Entertainment and announced the January 2009 issue of the long-running Electronic Gaming Monthly magazine would be its last.

=== Acquisition by Great Hill Partners ===
Former Time Inc. executive Vivek R. Shah, with financial backing from Boston private equity company Great Hill Partners, announced on June 4, 2010, the acquisition of Ziff Davis Inc. as the "first step in building a new digital media company that specializes in producing and distributing content for consumers making important buying decisions." At the time, Ziff Davis properties consisted of PCMag.com, ExtremeTech, GearLog, GoodCleanTech, DLtv, AppScout, CrankyGeeks, Smart Device Central and TechSaver.com, and reached over 7 million users a month.

Shah, with intentions of revitalizing the business, serial purchased logicbuy.com, geek.com, computershopper.com, toolbox.com, and Focus Research. Focus Research was a major provider of online research to enterprise buyers and high-quality leads to IT vendors, operating ITManagement.com, ITSecurity.com, VOIP-News.com and InsideCRM.com. It was later renamed to Ziff Davis B2B Focus and operated as a stand-alone unit within Ziff Davis.

=== Sale to J2 Global ===
On November 16, 2012, Great Hill sold the company to J2 Global, a provider of cloud services. The purchase price was $175 million, approximately 2.9 times the estimated 2013 revenue. J2 Global actually paid $167 million in an all-cash deal.

On February 4, 2013, Ziff Davis acquired IGN Entertainment from News Corporation. Soon afterward, Ziff Davis announced the discontinuation of the 1UP.com, UGO.com, and GameSpy.com sites in order to "[focus] on our two flagship brands, IGN and AskMen".

In 2013, Ziff Davis acquired NetShelter, a display advertising network oriented towards consumer electronics and technology publishers, from ImPowered. Also in 2013, Ziff Davis acquired TechBargains.com, a deal aggregation site for consumer electronics.

In 2014, Ziff Davis acquired eMedia Communications from Reed Business Information. In December 2014, Ziff Davis acquired Ookla, owner of Speedtest.net.

In 2015, Ziff Davis acquired Offers.com an online source of offers, deals, coupons, coupon codes, promos, free trials, and more.

In October 2016, Ziff Davis entered into an agreement to acquire Everyday Health. The deal was completed in December of that year.

In 2017, Ziff Davis acquired Mashable, an American entertainment, culture, tech, science and social good digital media platform, for $50 million. Following its acquisition of Mashable, Ziff Davis announced that it would implement longer, more in-depth content to boost the site's search traffic and restructure the platform to reduce costs.

In 2018, Ziff Davis had 117 million readers, reaching 115 countries with 60 international editions. Most of Ziff Davis's international editions are partnerships with local publishers, all of whom use a domestic content management system. The common CMS lets oversea editions get content from Ziff Davis's owned-and-operated markets and re-purpose it for their own editions. To establish itself in foreign markets, Ziff Davis asks its local partner to hold events. Popular past events include IGN Convention Bahrain, Abu Dhabi, and Qatar.

In November 2018, employees from Mashable, PCMag, AskMen, and Geek.com formed a union with the NewsGuild of New York. The Ziff Davis Creators Guild finalized its first contract in June 2021.

In 2019, Ziff Davis acquired Spiceworks, a professional network for the information technology industry.

In 2020, Ziff Davis acquired RetailMeNot for $420 million, an aggregator of coupon offers across multiple website properties.

=== Split from J2 Global, revival of Ziff Davis branding ===
In April 2021, J2 Global announced plans to split into two separate publicly traded companies, with its cloud fax business being spun off as Consensus, and J2 retaining its media properties. The split was completed in September 2021; in August 2021, it was announced that J2 Global would rebrand as Ziff Davis, Inc. following the completion of the split, with CEO Vivek Shah citing the brand's "long and distinguished history, including a remarkable digital transformation over the past decade".

In 2023, Ziff Davis acquired Lifehacker for an undisclosed sum from G/O Media.

On February 6, 2024, employees at IGN publicly announced their intention to unionize as the IGN Creators Guild with NewsGuild-CWA. Ziff Davis voluntarily recognized the union later that month.

On May 21, 2024, it was reported that IGN Entertainment had acquired Gamer Network from ReedPop, including GamesIndustry.biz, Eurogamer, Rock Paper Shotgun, VG247, and Dicebreaker. It also gained shares in OutsideXbox, Digital Foundry, and Hookshot (owners of Nintendo Life, PushSquare, PureXbox, and Time Extension).

In August 2024, Ziff Davis acquired CNET from Red Ventures for $100 million; it also regained ownership of ZDNet for the first time since its acquisition by CNET Networks in 2000.

404 Media reported on February 20, 2025 that Ziff Davis had removed information about diversity-focused employee resource groups, inclusion-based hiring goals and diversity training from its corporate website over the preceding month.

In March 2025, Everyday Health Group, a division of Ziff Davis, acquired The Skimm, a digital media company known for its newsletters. In July 2025, the company announced it had acquired Well+Good and Livestrong from Graham Holdings.

Ziff Davis sued OpenAI on April 24, 2025, alleging copyright infringement in connection with the use of its publications in artificial intelligence systems. The lawsuit alleged that OpenAI used copyrighted material from Ziff Davis publications without authorization. On August 6, 2026, the court dismissed with prejudice Ziff Davis’s active contributory copyright infringement claim based on a ‘material contribution’ theory and its active federal and state trademark dilution claims. Claims containing certain models that had been stayed were dismissed without prejudice.

Ziff Davis announced on March 3, 2026 an agreement to sell its Connectivity division to Accenture for $1.2 billion. The division included Ookla, Speedtest, Ekahau, Downdetector, and RootMetrics. The transaction closed on June 17, 2026. On March 4, 2026, Ziff Davis sold its back catalog of over 60 titles published under the Humble Bundle name to Good Games Group. Games involved in the sale included Slay the Spire, A Hat in Time, SIGNALIS, Forager, Coral Island, Monaco, and Wizard of Legend.

In May 2026, Ziff Davis acquired Business of Home, Domino, Dwell, and Popular Science from Recurrent Ventures. PopSci will join the company's technology division, while the three home brands would be the start of a new lifestyle division under Business of Home founder Julia Noran Johnston.

== Properties ==
=== Current ===
- AskMen
- BestBlackFriday.com
- BlackFriday.com
- Business of Home
- CNET
- Deals of America
- Domino
- Dwell
- emedia
- eVoice
- Eurogamer
- Everyday Health Group (includes Everyday Health, Diabetes Daily, Migraine Again, DailyOM, What to Expect, BabyCenter, and Emma's Diary)
- ExtremeTech
- GamesIndustry.biz
- HowLongToBeat.com
- HR Technologist
- Humble Bundle
- IGN
- IPVanish
- Lifehacker
- Line2
- Livedrive
- Lose It!
- Mashable
- MarTech Advisor
- Moz.com
- Offers.com
- PCMag
- Popular Science
- RetailMeNot
- Rock Paper Shotgun
- Salesify
- SMTP
- MapGenie
- Spiceworks
- StrongVPN
- SugarSync
- TDS Gift Cards
- Techbargains.com
- The Skimm
- Toolbox.com
- VG247
- VIPRE
- ZDNet
- Ziff Davis Tech
- Ziff Davis B2B

=== Sold ===
- DeveloperShed.com
- eSeminars (sold to QuinStreet)
- Electronic Gaming Monthly (sold back to magazine founder Steve Harris)
- FileFront
- GameTab.com
- GameVideos.com
- Linux-Watch (sold to QuinStreet)
- Linuxdevices.com (sold to QuinStreet)
- Microsoft Watch (sold to QuinStreet)
- MyCheats.com
- Ookla (sold to Accenture)
  - Downdetector
  - Ekahau
  - RootMetrics
  - Speedtest.net
- PDF Zone (sold to QuinStreet)
- Publish (sold to QuinStreet)

=== Discontinued ===
- 1Up.com
- A+ Magazine
- Computer Gaming World
- Creative Computing
- Dicebreaker
- GameNOW
- Games for Windows: The Official Magazine
- GameSpy (formerly part of IGN Network)
- GameTrailers
- Geek.com
- GMR
- MacUser (US Edition, 1985–1997)
- Microsystems
- Official U.S. PlayStation Magazine
- Patch Management
- PC Magazine – continues online
- PC/Computing (formerly Ziff-Davis Smart Business)
- Small Business Center
- Sm@rt Partner
- UGO Networks
- Vault Network
- Windows Sources
- Xbox Nation
- Yahoo! Internet Life
