= Goldman =

Goldman is a surname most common among Ashkenazi Jews. Notable people with the surname include:

- Alain Goldman (born 1961), French film producer
- Alan H. Goldman (born 1945), American philosopher
- Alan S. Goldman (born 1958), American chemist
- Albert Goldman (1927–1994), American professor and author
- Albert Goldman (politician) (1897–1960), American Trotskyist lawyer
- Albina A. Goldman (born 1944), Russian philologist, professor North-Eastern Federal University (Yakutsk State University)
- Allan H. Goldman (1943–2022), American real estate investor
- Allen Goldman (1937–2025), American physicist
- Alvin Goldman (1938–2024), American philosopher, epistemologist
- Ari L. Goldman (born 1949), American journalist
- Bernard Goldman (1922–2006), American art historian, married to Norma
- Bo Goldman (1932–2023), American writer, Broadway playwright and screenwriter.
- Bobby Goldman (1938–1999), American bridge player
- Charles R. Goldman (born 1930), American limnologist and ecologist
- Charley Goldman (1887–1968), Polish-born American boxer and boxing trainer
- Craig Goldman (born 1968), American politician
- Danny Goldman (1939–2020), American actor and voice actor
- Dan Goldman (born 1976), American politician and attorney
- Douglas E. Goldman (born 1952), American businessman and philanthropist
- Duff Goldman (born 1974), American Food Network personality
- Edward Alphonso Goldman (1873–1946), American zoologist
- Edwin Franko Goldman (1878–1956), American band composer, founder of the American Bandmasters Association
- Emma Goldman (1869–1940), Russian-born anarchist writer and speaker
- Francisco Goldman (born 1954), American novelist
- Irving B. Goldman (1898–1975), American otolaryngologist and plastic surgeon
- James Goldman (1927–1998), American playwright and screenwriter
- Jane Goldman (born 1970), British writer and television presenter; wife of Jonathan Ross
- Jean-Jacques Goldman (born 1951), French singer and songwriter
- John D. Goldman (born 1949), American businessman and philanthropist
- John M. Goldman (1938–2013), British haematologist, oncologist and medical researcher
- Leon Goldman (1906–1997), American surgeon and pioneer in laser medicine
- Leon Goldman (1904-1975), American surgeon
- Lipa Goldman (1905/07–1980), Hungarian-born American Orthodox rabbi
- Lloyd Goldman (born 1958), American real estate developer
- Lynn Goldman (born 1951), American physician and academic
- Marcus Goldman (1821–1904), German-American businessman and entrepreneur, co-founder of Goldman Sachs
- Marcus J. Goldman (born 1960), American psychiatrist, physician, conservative writer
- Marie Goldman, British politician
- Marion Goldman (born 1945), American sociologist
- Marshall Goldman (1930–2017), American economist
- Marvin Goldman (born 1928), American physiologist and radiation biologist
- Marvin G. Goldman (born 1939), American lawyer and aviation historian
- Mike Goldman (born 1972), Australian TV personality
- Norma Goldman (1922–2011), American classicist, married to Bernard
- Omer Goldman (born 1989), Israeli actress and political activist
- Oscar Goldman (character), fictional character
- Oscar Goldman (1925–1986), American mathematician
- Patricia A. Goldman (1942–2023), American public official and women's rights advocat
- Peter Emanuel Goldman (born 1939), American filmmaker, writer and investigative columnist
- Phil Goldman (1964–2003), American engineer and entrepreneur
- Pierre Goldman (1944–1979), French left-wing intellectual
- Rachel Goldman, American physicist
- Rhoda Haas Goldman (1924–1996), American philanthropist
- Richard Goldman (1920–2010), American businessman and philanthropist
- Robert D. Goldman (born 1939), American cell and molecular biologist, author, and President of the American Society for Cell Biology, 2008
- Ronald Goldman (1968–1994), victim in the O.J. Simpson murder case
- Ronald Goldman, Australian psychologist and author
- Sally Goldman, American computer scientist and powerlifter
- Sylvan Goldman (1898–1984), American businessman and inventor
- Todd Goldman, American entrepreneur and artist
- Vivien Goldman (born 1952), British journalist, writer and musician
- Wendy Z. Goldman (born 1956), American historian, currently the Paul Mellon Distinguished Professor at Carnegie Mellon University.
- William Goldman (1931-2018), American screenwriter and author
- Yoel Goldman (born 1980), American real estate developer
- Yosef Goldman (1942–2015), Hungarian-born American scholar and author

== See also ==
- Goldman, Missouri, a community in the United States
- Goldman Band, early 20th century band
- Goldman Environmental Prize
- Goldman equation
- Goldman Sachs, leading investment bank, founded by Marcus Goldman
- Goldman School of Dental Medicine, Boston University, USA
- Goldman School of Public Policy, University of California, Berkeley
- Goldmann
- List of Family Guy characters#Goldman family, fictional family
