= Alan Goldman =

Alan or Allan Goldman may refer to:

- Alan H. Goldman (born 1945), American philosopher
- Alan J. Goldman (1932–2010), American expert in operations research
- Alan S. Goldman (born 1958), American chemist
- Allan H. Goldman (born 1943), American real estate investor

== See also ==
- Allen Goldman (1937–2025), American physicist
- Alain Goldman (born 1961), French film producer
