= La Querida (mansion) =

Palm Beach mansion in Florida

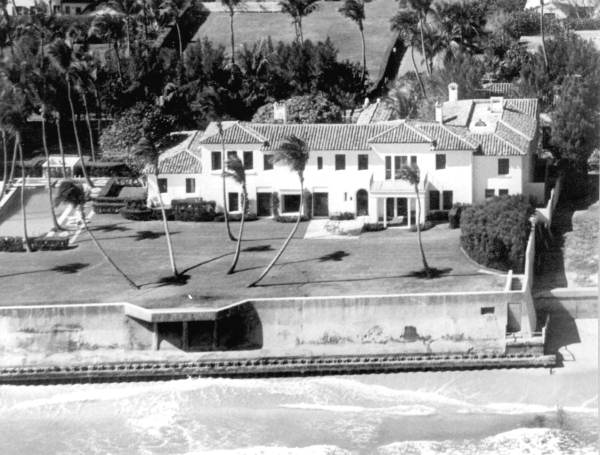
- La Querida as viewed from the ocean during the Kennedy family ownership (circa 1965)

General information
- Type: Mansion
- Architectural style: Mediterranean Revival
- Location: 1095 N. Ocean Boulevard, Palm Beach, Florida, 33480, United States
- Coordinates: 26°45′10″N 80°2′11″W
- Year built: 1923
- Cost: $50,000
- Owner: Carl and Mary Jane Panattoni

Design and construction
- Architect: Addison Mizner

La Querida ("the dear one"), (Note: Sometimes erroneously referred to as La Guerida ("bounty of war")) also known as Castillo del Mar ("castle by the sea") for several years, is a residence in Palm Beach, Florida, located at 1095 N. Ocean Boulevard. Completed in 1923, it was built in the Mediterranean Revival style by well-known architect Addison Mizner at a cost of $50,000. The home is most notable for serving as the "Winter White House" during the presidency of John F. Kennedy. As of 2015, La Querida contains over 15,000 sq ft (1,400 m^{2}) of living space, including eleven bedrooms, twelve bathrooms, and three half-bathrooms.

La Querida has been owned by a few other notable individuals since the Kennedy family sold the property in 1995, including businessman John K. Castle and real estate investor Jane Goldman. The current owners are Carl (founder of Panattoni Development Company) and Mary Jane Panattoni, who purchased the home in June 2020 for $70 million.

== Early history ==
Prominent South Florida architect Addison Mizner built La Querida in 1923 at a cost reported to be $50,000 for Rodman Wanamaker of Philadelphia, heir to the Wanamaker's Department Store fortune. Constructed in the Mediterranean Revival style, La Querida is located at 1095 N. Ocean Boulevard in Palm Beach. Following Wanamaker's death in 1928, all of his estate, which was valued at around $75 million, except for annuities was transferred to a trust. That September, the home suffered major damage during the 1928 Okeechobee hurricane, with The Palm Beach Post noting that "No chance remains of again utilizing the home of Rodman Wanamaker III, unless it is almost entirely rebuilt".

Chalker and Lund, Inc. began restoring La Querida in early October 1928 under a $60,000 contract, with the expectation that work would be finished by January 1, 1929. The renovation also included the addition of a stronger seawall and a sunroom, as well as the enlargement of the living room and servants' quarters. The house remained mostly vacant in the winter seasons of 1931–1932 and 1932–1933, except for a few visits by the late Rodman Wanamaker's niece, Mary Brown Warburton, who was the daughter of Barclay Harding Warburton I and Mary Brown Wanamaker.

== Kennedy ownership ==
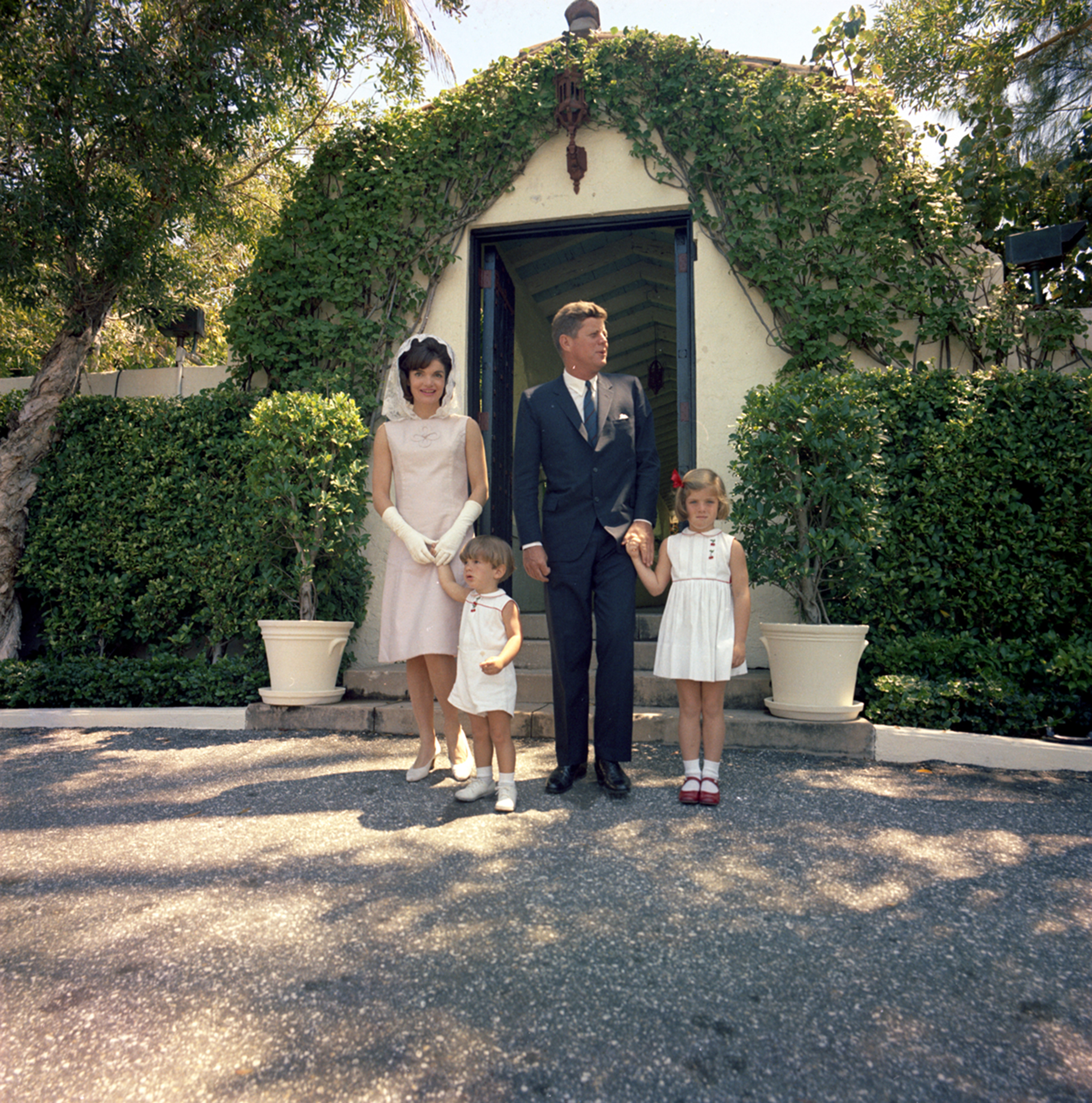
President John Kennedy and the First Lady along with their children Caroline and John Jr. outside of the home in Easter of 1963

The Wanamaker family sold La Querida to Joseph P. Kennedy Sr. for $120,000 on June 30, 1933. At the time, a description in The Palm Beach Post noted that the property included 176 feet (54 m) of oceanfront, six master bedrooms, five bathrooms, and "spacious living quarters".

Following their purchase, the home acted as a winter retreat for the family. The Kennedys usually only lived at La Querida around the Christmas and Easter holidays. One notable guest at the home during this period was James Roosevelt (eldest son of United States President Franklin D. Roosevelt) and his then-wife Betsey, who stayed at La Querida a few times, including in 1934 and 1935. Kennedy Sr. hired Maurice Fatio, an architect with several notable works, to design a two-floor car garage, pool pavilion, and tennis court. He also enlarged the estate by purchasing adjacent land.

In 1955, then-U.S. Senator John F. Kennedy (D–Massachusetts) spent several months at the home in Palm Beach while recovering from a surgery necessitated by a spinal injury he suffered in World War II. It is said that during his recovery at La Querida, Senator Kennedy wrote Profiles in Courage, a Pulitzer Prize-winning book. Senator Kennedy also handwrote the first draft of his announcement speech for his candidacy for president of the United States in the upcoming 1960 election while at La Querida on April 1, 1959. The handwritten draft sold for $160,000 at an auction in September 2015.

One week after being elected president of the United States in 1960, John F. Kennedy hosted an informal press luncheon at La Querida on November 15. Kennedy is also said to have begun selecting members of his cabinet in the home's library room. In a 1995 lawsuit to argue against the significance of the property to discourage its designation as a Palm Beach town landmark by the Landmarks Preservation Commission, lawyers representing the family denied that Kennedy appointed any cabinet members at La Querida. However, in a press conference at the house on December 17, 1960, Kennedy announced his choice of J. Edward Day as United States postmaster general. Twelve days later, The New York Times noted that during another press conference held at La Querida, president-elect Kennedy informed reporters about the selection of several other officials, including W. Averell Harriman as Ambassador at Large, Robert Roosa as Under-Secretary of the Treasury for Monetary Affairs, and James M. Landis as a White House staffer.

When president-elect Kennedy visited Palm Beach in December 1960, Richard Paul Pavlick nearly carried out an assassination attempt. Pavlick drove from New Hampshire to Palm Beach with a car full of dynamite. While Kennedy was at La Querida preparing to leave for Sunday Mass at St. Edward Catholic Church on December 11, Pavlick waited outside the home and intended to crash his car into Kennedy's limousine. Pavlick decided to forgo his plan after noticing that Kennedy was accompanied by his wife and young children and decided to pick another day for the assassination attempt. However, on December 15, the Palm Beach Police Department arrested him at the intersection of North County Road and Royal Poinciana Way after receiving information from the Secret Service. Pavlick was charged with threatening to assassinate Kennedy, but after he was declared legally insane by federal judge Emett Clay Choate on December 2, 1963, charges were reduced to unlawful transportation of dynamite across state lines.

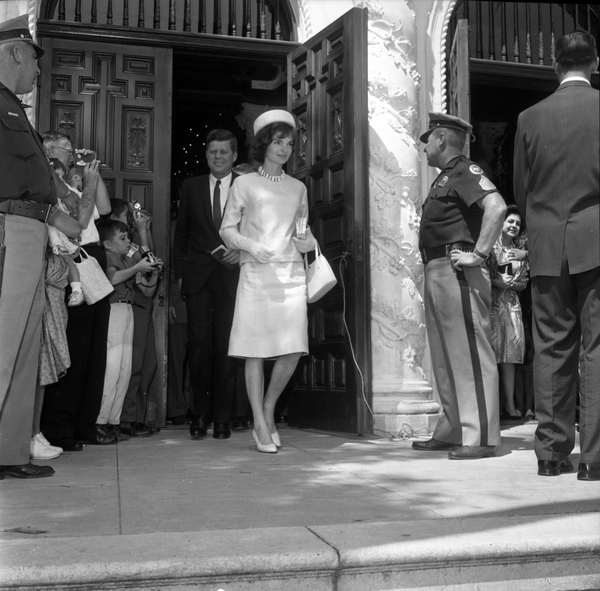
President Kennedy and the First Lady leaving Mass in Palm Beach in 1961

In January 1961, Senator Kennedy, with the assistance of speechwriter Ted Sorensen, drafted much of his inaugural address at La Querida. After Kennedy assumed the office of president of the United States, La Querida became his "Winter White House". He met there with Secretary of State Dean Rusk on April 1, 1961, to discuss the Laotian Civil War, with the president calling for a ceasefire and for the Soviet government to "use their influence" to assist with stopping the conflict. Also that weekend, Easter, local and federal law enforcement uncovered an alleged plot by four pro-Castro Cubans to assassinate Kennedy and abduct his daughter Caroline, then three years old, while they stayed in Palm Beach. Thereafter, Kennedy sometimes temporarily stayed at the home of Josephine Perfect Bay and Paul Michael Iogolevitch, such as in the 1961–62 and 1962–63 winter seasons. However, in December 1962, President Kennedy met with Israeli foreign affairs minister (and later prime minister) Golda Meir at La Querida. They discussed the sale of MIM-23 Hawk missiles and Kennedy's concerns about Israel developing nuclear weapons and their raids on refugee camps in Jordan and Syria.

President Kennedy's final trip to Palm Beach occurred in mid-November 1963, during which he stayed at La Querida. There, Kennedy, special assistant to the president Ralph A. Dungan, and Peace Corps official Richard N. Goodwin discussed Latin American policy due to waning enthusiasm for his Alliance for Progress program among several officials in the region. Kennedy's trip to La Querida turned out to be his last weekend alive, as he was assassinated days later in Texas.

Following Joseph P. Kennedy Sr.'s death in November 1969, several newspapers reported that the family intended to sell La Querida. In January 1970, however, the Kennedys stated that they did not plan to sell the estate and instead considered renting it out after significant renovations, before ultimately scrapping that idea as well. During the next few decades, the house occasionally became associated with some drinking incidents involving Senator Ted Kennedy and later with William Kennedy Smith's 1991 rape trial. In the early morning hours of March 30, 1991, Smith rode with a woman he met at Au Bar in Palm Beach, later identified as Patricia Bowman, back to La Querida. Bowman then alleged that Smith raped her by the pool. However, Smith argued that the encounter was consensual, with the trial resulting in his acquittal on December 11.

The town government of Palm Beach began attempting in the 1980s to list the property as a local historic landmark via the Landmarks Preservation Commission. Owners of properties designated as landmarks must seek permission from the commission to make any significant changes to their structure. The Kennedys fought against efforts to list La Querida as a local landmark. In 1980, town commissioners rejected the proposal to give the home this designation due to a report by a consultant concluding that the property lacked architectural significance.

A second attempt to list the house as a town landmark occurred in 1990. That time, the Kennedy family hired an attorney to fight the designation, as owners cannot directly reject having their property selected. The Palm Beach Landmarks Preservation Commission chair, James Sullivan, remarked that by resisting the home's selection, "The Kennedys have lost an opportunity to acknowledge the significance of a home that played such an important role in our nation's history." The Commission decided to table the proposal.

The town government began a third attempt to designate the property as a local landmark in February 1995. Eunice Kennedy Shriver filed a lawsuit, describing the new effort to place La Querida on the list of landmarks as "nothing but harassment". A judge decided not to allow the suit to proceed until after town proceedings were complete. By then, the lawyer representing the Kennedys argued that landmark designation could even decrease the value of the house and prospects for selling it. Although the Kennedys and the Landmarks Preservation Commission agreed on a compromise to allow only the gate and wall to be designated, town commissioners narrowly rejected the proposal on May 9 because, as mayor Paul Ilyinsky stated, "the whole business should be sent back for a complete designation hearing,."

== Subsequent ownership ==
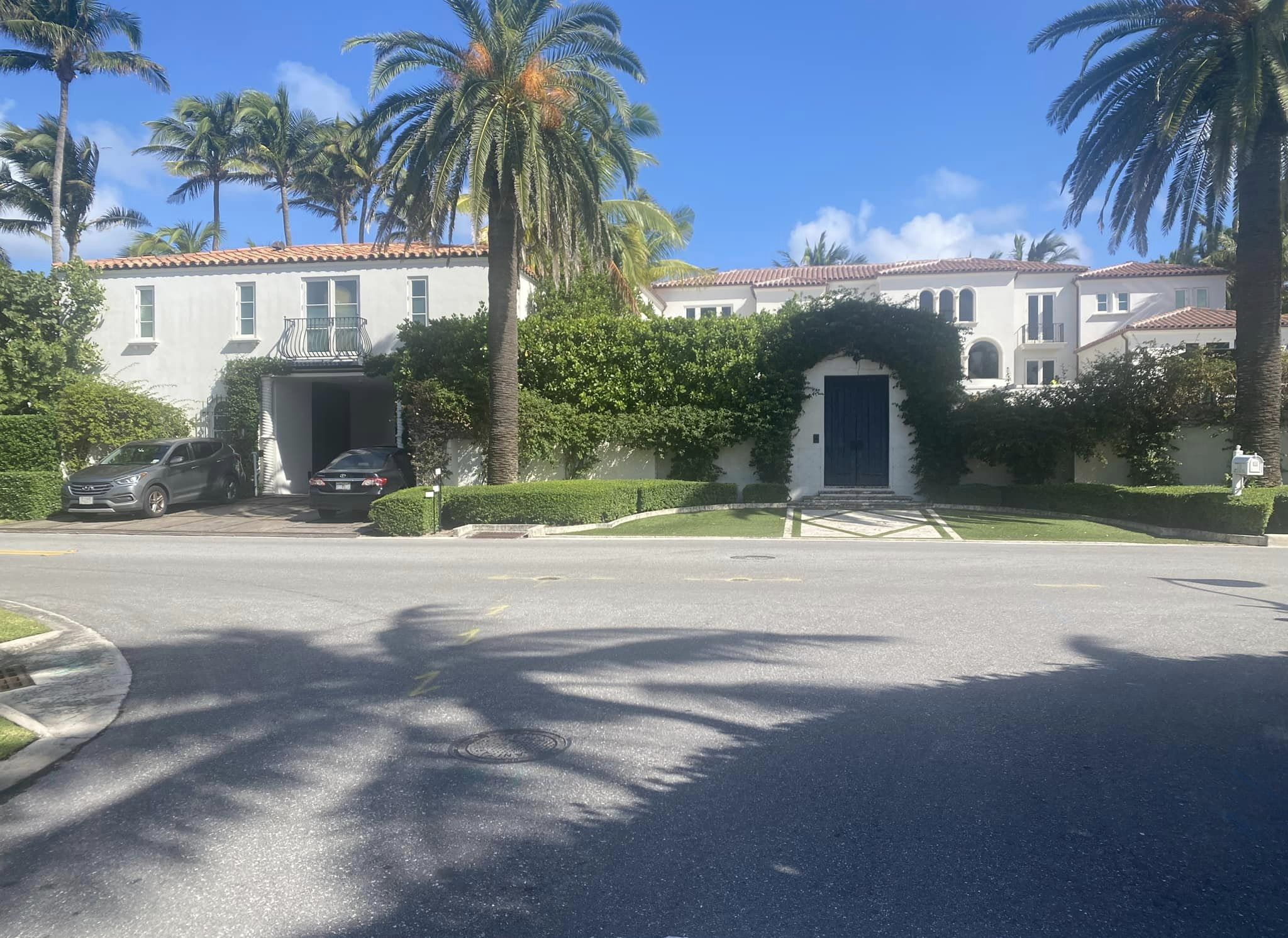
La Querida in November 2024

The Kennedys placed La Querida on the real estate market in late 1993, although a sale did not occur until May 1995, about four months after Rose Kennedy's death. A historian who closely documented the family, Arthur M. Schlesinger Jr., wrote that "Palm Beach is not a place where the youngest generation of Kennedys finds sustenance," contributing to their decision to sell La Querida. John K. Castle, the CEO of Castle Harlan, purchased the house for approximately $5 million, below the asking price of $7 million. In the process, the 15-year dispute to designate the property as a landmark concluded. The town council initially rejected a proposal to landmark only the gate and front wall, but reversed course in a unanimous vote on May 16. They, along with the Kennedys and Castles, reached a compromise that would immediately list the gate and front wall as landmarks but also the entire structure within five years.

An architect hired by Castle described the house as not having any significant renovations since 1928, other than electricity and plumbing. Castle stated his intentions to renovate La Querida but in a manner consistent with town guidelines for designation as a historic landmark. Nicknaming the house Castillo del Mar ("castle by the sea"), the Castles retained furnishings from the Kennedys in several rooms, added fireplaces, and replaced some windows and doors. In 1998, the Castles moved into the residence. However, many of these changes were reversed after Castle sold the home to real estate investor Jane Goldman in 2015 for $31 million. After moving out, the Castles offered 153 items for auction in January 2016 at the Leslie Hindman Auctioneers showroom in West Palm Beach, profiting nearly $500,000.

In June 2020, Goldman sold La Querida to its current owners, Carl and Mary Jane Panattoni, for $70 million. Carl Panattoni is the owner and founder of Panattoni, an international real estate and warehouse developer. The Panattonis gained approval from town commissioners in October of that year for a few landscape changes and the removal of the tennis court, to enlarge the driveway.

== Architecture ==
The property on which La Querida sits comprises approximately 1 acre (0.40 ha), including about 200 feet (61 m) of oceanfront. Noted South Florida architect Mizner designed the house in 1923 in the Mediterranean Revival style. The Palm Beach Daily News noted that according to the 2015 listing by Lawrence A. Moens Associates, La Querida contained "15,347 square feet [1,425.8 square meters] of living space, 11 bedrooms, 12 bathrooms and three half-baths". The house includes French doors, added during Goldman's ownership of the property. Floor-to-ceiling windows are present in the dining room, kitchen, living room, and model room (a den). Walls in the living area are painted light blue and white, while the dining room has a similar color scheme, along with gold accents. Parts of the house have Moroccan-inspired tile. A spiral staircase is enclosed within a turret along the front façade of the house. The south end of La Querida is a two-story addition, constructed when the Castles owned the home, which allowed for a den on the first floor and another bathroom and bedroom on the second floor. Guest rooms and workspaces were created on the second floor when the Castles merged former staff bedrooms. La Querida also has a library room, where President Kennedy is said to have selected cabinet officials. Externally, the second story includes several wrought iron–lined balconies.

A wooden gate and tall perimeter wall partially obscure the front of the house from the road. Between the wooden gate and the entrance to the main house is a loggia, with a garden on one side. At least two outbuildings exist on the property: a two-story pool house and a two-story garage, the latter designed by Fatio. Under the ownership of Goldman, the garage was converted to a foyer. Other features added outside the main house by Fatio included a tennis court and pool, both of which remain on the property to this day, albeit with renovations and expansions.

== See also ==
- List of people from Palm Beach, Florida
- List of residences of presidents of the United States
- Detachment Hotel – A fallout shelter for President John F. Kennedy constructed on nearby Peanut Island
- Kennedy Compound – The property owned by the Kennedy family since 1928 in Hyannis Port, Massachusetts
- Mar-a-Lago – The Palm Beach residence of President Donald Trump
