= List of people from Palm Beach, Florida =

The following people were born, or live in, Palm Beach, Florida:

== Actors and actresses ==
- Ellen Barkin – actress
- George Hamilton – actor
- Mary Hartline – actress and model
- Margaret Hayes – actress
- Brett King – actor; later opened Coral Sands Hotel in the Bahamas; died in Palm Beach in 1999
- Alexander Kirkland – actor
- Dina Merrill – actress and socialite (daughter of E.F. Hutton & Marjorie Merriweather Post)
- Mark Patton – 1980s television and film actor
- Stephanie Seymour – model and actress
- Sylvester Stallone – actor
- Alfie Wise – actor
- Mary Woronov – actress

== Authors ==
- Ted Bell – bestselling author of suspense and espionage novels
- William S. Burroughs, Jr. – novelist, son of beat writer William S. Burroughs and great-grandson to William Seward Burroughs I, the original inventor of the Burroughs adding machine
- Ann Coulter – syndicated columnist, author, and political commentator
- Laurence Leamer – writer
- Dmitri Nabokov – son and literary heir of novelist Vladimir Nabokov
- Tony Nader – author and leader of the Transcendental Meditation movement
- James Patterson – best-selling author
- Richard René Silvin – author and lecturer

== Businesspersons ==
- S. Daniel Abraham – creator of Slim Fast
- Dan Borislow – founder of magicJack
- John K. Castle – chairman and CEO of Castle Harlan, Inc.
- James H. Clark – founder of Netscape
- Horace Dodge – Dodge automotive family member
- Jeffrey Epstein – financier and convicted sex offender
- Malcolm Glazer – CEO of First Allied Corporation, sports team owner (Manchester United of the Premier League and the Tampa Bay Buccaneers of the National Football League)
- Jane Goldman – real estate investor and daughter of Sol Goldman
- E.F. Hutton – Wall Street broker who built Mar-a-Lago, husband of Marjorie Merriweather Post
- Raymond Kassar – investor and former chairman and CEO of Atari and former vice-chair of Burlington Industries
- John Kluge – chairman of Metromedia, estimated net worth is $11 billion
- David Koch – vice president of Koch Industries
- Estée Lauder – businesswoman and mother of Leonard and Ronald Lauder
- Leonard Lauder – businessman, art collector, and heir of Estée Lauder Companies
- Edgar F. Luckenbach – shipping magnate
- Bernard Madoff – former NASDAQ chairman and convicted felon of various securities fraud
- Ruth Madoff – wife of Bernie Madoff
- Charles Peter McColough – former chairman and CEO of the Xerox Corporation
- Gurnee Munn – president of American Totalisator
- Bud Paxson – founder of Paxson Communications
- Nelson Peltz – billionaire businessman and investor
- Ronald Perelman – corporate raider, chairman of Revlon; sold his Palm Beach house in 2004 for $70 million
- Jeffry Picower – investor and philanthropist involved in the Madoff investment scandal
- John Sculley – former CEO of Apple, Inc and former president of PepsiCo
- Christopher A. Sinclair – chairman and CEO of Mattel, former CEO of Pepsi-Cola

== Music ==
- Jon Bon Jovi – singer from New Jersey; in March 2018 purchased a home on the island
- Jimmy Buffett – singer
- Vic Damone – singer-songwriter, actor
- Michael Jackson – singer, lived there briefly, 2003–2005
- John Lennon – musician with The Beatles; bought Harold Vanderbilt's former home, El Solano, in 1980 shortly before his murder
- Rod Stewart – singer
- Butch Trucks – founding member of the Allman Brothers Band

== Media ==
- Roger Ailes – television executive and media consultant
- Conrad Black – former Canadian media baron, author, and convicted fraudster; lived on Palm Beach Island for over twenty years
- Curt Gowdy – sportscaster
- Sean Hannity – television and radio political commentator
- Rush Limbaugh – radio show host, and conservative political commentator
- Mehmet Oz – better known as Dr. Oz, Turkish-American cardiothoracic surgeon, professor, author, and television personality
- Palm Beach Pete – social media personality
- Howard Stern – radio personality

== Philanthropists ==
- Mary Duke Biddle – philanthropist and wife of Anthony Joseph Drexel Biddle Jr.
- Nancy Brinker – founder of Susan G. Komen for the Cure
- Joseph Gurwin – philanthropist
- Janet Annenberg Hooker – philanthropist and daughter of Moses Annenberg
- Evelyn Lauder – co-creator of the Pink Ribbon breast cancer awareness campaign, creator of Clinique
- Marjorie Merriweather Post – Post cereal heiress, socialite, and philanthropist who built Mar-a-Lago; wife of E.F. Hutton
- Mollie Wilmot – philanthropist and socialite
- Jayne Wrightsman – philanthropist and socialite

== Politicians ==
- Chester C. Bolton – congressman from Ohio
- Frances P. Bolton – wife of Chester C. Bolton; served out the remainder of her husband's term after his death and then for nearly 30 years thereafter
- Paul Ilyinsky – mayor of Palm Beach
- Kennedy family – political family
- Brian Mulroney – former Canadian prime minister
- Henry Paulson – former US treasury secretary
- Wilbur Ross – US secretary of commerce
- Earl E. T. Smith – former United States ambassador to Cuba and mayor of Palm Beach
- Donald Trump – 45th and 47th president of the United States
- Ivana Trump – ex-wife of Donald Trump, until 2016
- Melania Trump – wife of Donald Trump

== Sports figures ==
- Logan Allen – MLB pitcher for the San Diego Padres
- Steve Alvers – American football player
- Rich Barnes – MLB pitcher for the Chicago White Sox and Cleveland Indians
- Scottie Barnes – NBA small forward for the Toronto Raptors
- Herman Barron – professional golfer
- Paul Fentress – Olympic field hockey player
- Richie Guerin – NBA shooting guard for the New York Knicks and Atlanta Hawks
- Lamar Jackson – NFL quarterback for the Baltimore Ravens
- Kevin Ohme – MLB pitcher for the St. Louis Cardinals

== Others ==
- Madeleine Astor – Titanic survivor and widow of John Jacob Astor IV
- Anthony Joseph Drexel Biddle Jr. – United States ambassador to several countries between the 1930s and 1960s
- Billy Bishop – World War I flying ace; died while spending the winter of 1956 in Palm Beach
- Henry Morrison Flagler – founder of Palm Beach
- Robert W. Gottfried – homebuilder
- Paul Tudor Jones – hedge fund manager and philanthropist
- Lana J. Marks – designer
- Addison Mizner – influential architect of Palm Beach landmarks and residences in the 1920s
- Paris Singer – builder of Everglades Club, within which is his apartment
- Harold Vanderbilt – railroad executive, great-grandson of Cornelius Vanderbilt, owned El Solano before John Lennon bought it
- Vera Wang – fashion designer (sold the $9m mansion she owned on the Palm Beach coast and moved to NYC)
- Joseph E. Widener – founding benefactor of the National Gallery of Art, philanthropist, and horseman
