= Amy Fowler =

Amy Fowler may refer to:

- Amy Farrah Fowler, a character on the TV series The Big Bang Theory
- Amy Goldman Fowler (born 1954), gardener, author and advocate for seed saving
- Amy Fowler, a character in the film High Noon, played by Grace Kelly
