= 1960 United States presidential election in Florida =

- November 8, 1960

Nominee	Richard Nixon	John F. Kennedy
Party	Republican	Democratic
Home state	California	Massachusetts
Running mate	Henry Cabot Lodge Jr.	Lyndon B. Johnson
Electoral vote	10	0
Popular vote	795,476	748,700
Percentage	51.51%	48.49%
County results
Nixon
50–60%
60–70%
70–80%
Kennedy
50–60%
60–70%
70–80%
President before election
Dwight D. Eisenhower
Republican
Elected President
John F. Kennedy
Democratic

The 1960 United States presidential election in Florida was held on November 8, 1960. All contemporary fifty states took part, and Florida voters selected 10 electors to the Electoral College, who voted for president and vice president.

Republican candidate Richard Nixon won against John F. Kennedy by 46,776 votes and by 3.02%. As of the 2024 presidential election, this is the last election in which Clay, Escambia, Okaloosa, and Santa Rosa counties voted for a Democratic presidential candidate. This was the first time that a Democrat was elected without winning Florida. It was also the first time since 1924 that Florida failed to vote for the winner of the presidential election. This has since happened only twice, in 1992 and 2020.

== Background ==
As a Southern state, Florida became part of the Solid South following the end of Reconstruction due to disfranchising African Americans and many poor white people. From the 1880s to the 1940s, Florida only supported the Republican Party nominee for President of the United States once, for Herbert Hoover in 1928 over Al Smith, often attributed to prejudice against Smith's Catholic faith and his opposition to Prohibition in a state that favored banning alcohol at the time. Florida then supported Democrats Franklin D. Roosevelt and Harry Truman in the 1930s and 1940s.

However, Republican Dwight D. Eisenhower defeated Democrat Adlai Stevenson II in Florida in 1952 and 1956. Randy Wade Babish's thesis argued that the state became more Republican due to people moving to Florida from the Northeastern United States during the post-World War II boom. The number of registered Republicans in Florida totaled 60,665 in 1950, but increased to 338,390 in 1960, accounting for approximately 20% of registered voters throughout the state. Many transplants to Florida moved to South Florida. Consequently, a pattern soon emerged in which North Florida generally remained loyal to its Solid South roots by continuing to support Democrats, but South Florida became more favorable to the Republican Party.

== Primary elections ==
=== Democratic primary ===
The Democratic Party presidential primary in Florida was held on May 24. Although Senator John F. Kennedy of Massachusetts ultimately won the Democratic Party nomination for the 1960 United States presidential election, Senator George Smathers of Florida ran opposed in the primary contest for this state. A favorite son, Smathers received 322,235 votes and 29 delegate votes. Also on May 24, Florida Governor LeRoy Collins was selected to be the chair of the 1960 Democratic National Convention.

=== Republican primary ===
The Republican Party presidential primary in Florida was also held on May 24. Although several candidates had competed for the party's nomination, incumbent Vice President Richard Nixon held a commanding lead and was unopposed by the time the Florida primary occurred. Nixon won 51,036 votes, as well as 26 delegate votes. With the Florida primary held on the same day as the Tennessee Republican Party convention, both states allowed Nixon to clinch the Republican nomination, as he now had 686 out of 1,331 delegates, 20 more than a majority.

== Campaign ==
On April 1, 1959, at the Kennedy family's mansion in Palm Beach, Florida – known as La Querida – United States Senator John F. Kennedy of Massachusetts penned the first draft of his speech announcing his candidacy for President of the United States, a note which later sold for $160,000 at an auction in 2015. Also on that day, Kennedy held the first organizational meeting of his 1960 presidential campaign at La Querida.

Both nominees visited Florida, including on the same day, October 18, when Kennedy spoke in Jacksonville and Tampa and Nixon in Jacksonville and St. Petersburg. In those places, Nixon defended the Eisenhower administration and described Kennedy as a "prophet of doom and gloom." for portraying the direction of the country as being complacent against the Soviet Union. In response, Kennedy told people in Tampa that, "I sound the alarm-not with the idea that the country is doomed, but with the idea that if this country moves forward, nothing can stop it." He also questioned the Eisenhower administration's ability to maintain American prestige. Later that day, Kennedy and Nixon both addressed the American Legion convention, held in Miami that year. Kennedy reminded attendees that communists had taken over Cuba and argued that the United States was slipping behind the Soviet Union in terms of power, including claiming that they intended to soon produce missiles two or three times as fast as the United States. In turn, Nixon stated that more than 600 million people had come under communist leadership during the Truman administration and that Eisenhower "got America out of one war, kept her out of others, and we do have peace today." Six days later, on October 12, Democratic Vice Presidential nominee Lyndon B. Johnson visited Jacksonville and Tampa and criticized the outgoing administration's foreign policy efforts in Cuba and against communism in general.

Only four out of the thirty-one daily newspapers in Florida at the time endorsed Kennedy. Among those picking Nixon was the Tallahassee Democrat, which historically supported Democrats. The Orlando Sentinel was particularly disapproving of Kennedy, describing him, Lyndon B. Johnson, and the Democratic Party platform as being a "hogwash mix of statism, socialism, welfarism, apology and appeasement". While the Miami Herald, Orlando Sentinel, and Tampa Tribune each endorsed Nixon, they explicitly rejected Kennedy's Catholic faith as a justifiable reason to not vote for him. The Miami Herald polled residents throughout the state and found that Tampa and the Florida panhandle preferred Kennedy, while Orlando and Sarasota backed Nixon, who also received support but to a lesser extent in Fort Lauderdale and West Palm Beach. Jacksonville was almost equally split between Kennedy and Nixon. The Florida Poll, conducted by the First Research Corporation and sponsored by the Miami Herald and St. Petersburg Times, both of whom published its results on November 6, showed Kennedy obtaining 51% of the vote in the state.

== Results ==
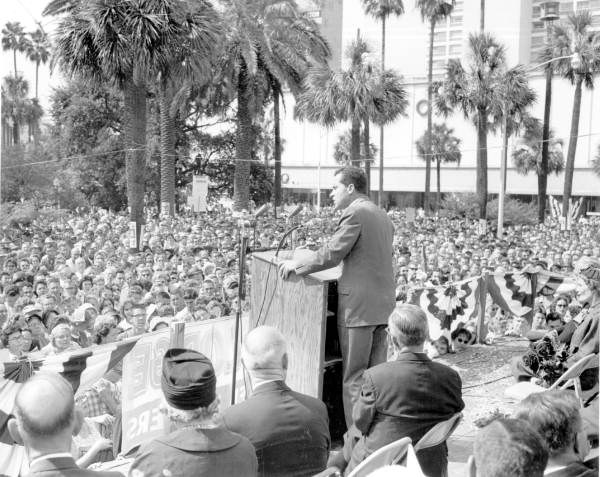
Richard Nixon giving a campaign speech at Hemming Park in Jacksonville.

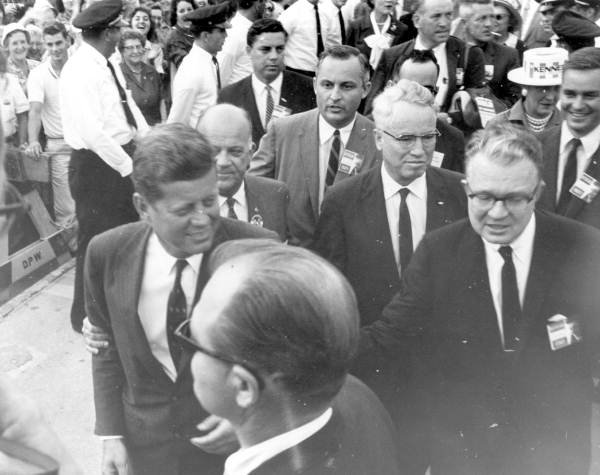
John F. Kennedy while campaigning in Tampa.

Republican candidate Richard Nixon won against John F. Kennedy by 46,776 votes and by 3.02%. However, Kennedy won the presidency due to earning 303 electoral votes versus Nixon's 219 across the country. In fact, this was the first instance of a Democrat being elected president without carrying Florida. It was also the first time since 1924 that the state did not support the winner of the presidential election, which has only happened twice since then, in 1992 and 2020. As of the 2024 presidential election, this is the last election in which Clay, Escambia, Okaloosa, and Santa Rosa counties voted for a Democratic presidential candidate.

A similar pattern occurred as in 1952 and 1956, with Kennedy performing better in North Florida and the Florida panhandle but struggling in other parts of the state. Kennedy flipped several counties from Republican in 1956 to Democrat in 1960, including Duval, Hillsborough, and Miami-Dade (then known as Dade County), which are home to Jacksonville, Tampa, and Miami, respectively. However, Nixon defeated Kennedy by wide or relatively wide margins in Broward, Orange, Palm Beach (home of the Kennedy family's La Querida mansion), Pinellas, and Polk counties.

1960 United States presidential election in Florida
Party	Candidate	Running mate	Popular vote		Electoral vote	
Party	Candidate	Running mate	Count	%	Count	%
Republican	Richard Nixon of California	Henry Cabot Lodge Jr. of Massachusetts	795,476	51.51%	10	100.00%
Democratic	John F. Kennedy of Massachusetts	Lyndon Baines Johnson of Texas	748,700	48.49%	0	0.00%
Total			1,544,176	100.00%	10	100.00%

=== Results by county ===
County	Richard Nixon Republican		John F. Kennedy Democratic		Margin		Total votes cast
County	#	%	#	%	#	%	Total votes cast
Alachua	10,072	52.05%	9,279	47.95%	793	4.10%	19,351
Baker	398	21.32%	1,469	78.68%	-1,071	-57.36%	1,867
Bay	5,435	33.94%	10,579	66.06%	-5,144	-32.12%	16,014
Bradford	1,131	30.85%	2,535	69.15%	-1,404	-38.30%	3,666
Brevard	17,585	61.37%	11,069	38.63%	6,516	22.74%	28,654
Broward	68,294	58.82%	47,811	41.18%	20,483	17.64%	116,105
Calhoun	634	28.46%	1,594	71.54%	-960	-43.08%	2,228
Charlotte	3,026	60.92%	1,941	39.08%	1,085	21.84%	4,967
Citrus	1,861	51.82%	1,730	48.18%	131	3.64%	3,591
Clay	2,515	47.97%	2,728	52.03%	-213	-4.06%	5,243
Collier	2,708	60.74%	1,750	39.26%	958	21.48%	4,458
Columbia	2,094	36.17%	3,695	63.83%	-1,601	-27.66%	5,789
DeSoto	1,687	50.10%	1,680	49.90%	7	0.20%	3,367
Dixie	392	28.65%	976	71.35%	-584	-42.70%	1,368
Duval	59,073	45.73%	70,091	54.27%	-11,018	-8.54%	129,164
Escambia	17,925	38.79%	28,288	61.21%	-10,363	-22.42%	46,213
Flagler	426	31.35%	933	68.65%	-507	-37.30%	1,359
Franklin	764	33.84%	1,494	66.16%	-730	-32.32%	2,258
Gadsden	2,010	46.18%	2,343	53.82%	-333	-7.64%	4,353
Gilchrist	277	24.93%	834	75.07%	-557	-50.14%	1,111
Glades	314	44.35%	394	55.65%	-80	-11.30%	708
Gulf	657	21.86%	2,348	78.14%	-1,691	-56.28%	3,005
Hamilton	656	33.01%	1,331	66.99%	-675	-33.98%	1,987
Hardee	1,960	52.96%	1,741	47.04%	219	5.92%	3,701
Hendry	1,043	44.38%	1,307	55.62%	-264	-11.24%	2,350
Hernando	1,809	48.00%	1,960	52.00%	-151	-4.00%	3,769
Highlands	4,369	58.32%	3,122	41.68%	1,247	16.64%	7,491
Hillsborough	48,887	43.99%	62,240	56.01%	-13,353	-12.02%	111,127
Holmes	1,235	34.26%	2,370	65.74%	-1,135	-31.48%	3,605
Indian River	4,656	61.05%	2,970	38.95%	1,686	22.10%	7,626
Jackson	2,851	32.23%	5,994	67.77%	-3,143	-35.54%	8,845
Jefferson	600	34.70%	1,129	65.30%	-529	-30.60%	1,729
Lafayette	297	27.25%	793	72.75%	-496	-45.50%	1,090
Lake	12,979	72.45%	4,936	27.55%	8,043	44.90%	17,915
Lee	10,357	65.34%	5,494	34.66%	4,863	30.68%	15,851
Leon	9,079	46.53%	10,433	53.47%	-1,354	-6.94%	19,512
Levy	996	33.21%	2,003	66.79%	-1,007	-33.58%	2,999
Liberty	243	21.99%	862	78.01%	-619	-56.02%	1,105
Madison	1,152	35.60%	2,084	64.40%	-932	-28.80%	3,236
Manatee	16,462	65.13%	8,814	34.87%	7,648	30.26%	25,276
Marion	7,043	49.43%	7,206	50.57%	-163	-1.14%	14,249
Martin	3,701	58.15%	2,664	41.85%	1,037	16.30%	6,365
Miami-Dade	134,506	42.35%	183,114	57.65%	-48,608	-15.30%	317,620
Monroe	3,416	32.88%	6,972	67.12%	-3,556	-34.24%	10,388
Nassau	1,666	33.67%	3,282	66.33%	-1,616	-32.66%	4,948
Okaloosa	4,685	36.18%	8,263	63.82%	-3,578	-27.64%	12,948
Okeechobee	631	35.93%	1,125	64.07%	-494	-28.14%	1,756
Orange	48,244	70.98%	19,729	29.02%	28,515	41.96%	67,973
Osceola	4,691	68.29%	2,178	31.71%	2,513	36.58%	6,869
Palm Beach	45,337	60.28%	29,871	39.72%	15,466	20.56%	75,208
Pasco	7,188	55.21%	5,832	44.79%	1,356	10.42%	13,020
Pinellas	101,779	63.68%	58,054	36.32%	43,725	27.36%	159,833
Polk	31,618	57.32%	23,546	42.68%	8,072	14.64%	55,164
Putnam	4,236	48.72%	4,459	51.28%	-223	-2.56%	8,695
St. Johns	4,125	42.49%	5,583	57.51%	-1,458	-15.02%	9,708
St. Lucie	6,354	54.24%	5,360	45.76%	994	8.48%	11,714
Santa Rosa	2,777	35.89%	4,960	64.11%	-2,183	-28.22%	7,737
Sarasota	19,995	70.70%	8,287	29.30%	11,708	41.40%	28,282
Seminole	8,936	64.63%	4,891	35.37%	4,045	29.26%	13,827
Sumter	1,120	32.95%	2,279	67.05%	-1,159	-34.10%	3,399
Suwannee	1,536	35.51%	2,789	64.49%	-1,253	-28.98%	4,325
Taylor	1,212	38.85%	1,908	61.15%	-696	-22.30%	3,120
Union	311	24.84%	941	75.16%	-630	-50.32%	1,252
Volusia	28,367	54.82%	23,377	45.18%	4,990	9.64%	51,744
Wakulla	379	24.85%	1,146	75.15%	-767	-50.30%	1,525
Walton	1,484	28.95%	3,642	71.05%	-2,158	-42.10%	5,126
Washington	1,230	36.96%	2,098	63.04%	-868	-26.08%	3,328
Totals	795,476	51.51%	748,700	48.49%	46,776	3.02%	1,544,176

==== Counties that flipped from Republican to Democratic ====
A total of eight counties supported the Republican Party nominee in 1956 but the Democratic Party nominee in 1960, including:

- Clay
- Duval
- Hendry
- Hillsborough
- Marion
- Miami Dade
- Putnam
- St. Johns

==== Counties that flipped from Democratic to Republican ====
A total of two counties supported the Democratic Party nominee in 1956 but the Republican Party nominee in 1960, including:

- DeSoto
- Hardee

== Analysis and aftermath ==
Randy Wade Babish concluded in his thesis that the Space Race did not significantly impact the outcome of the vote in Florida, despite the presence of the launch centers at Cape Canaveral. Although Democratic nominee John F. Kennedy had often mentioned national prestige, Babish found few instances of the Space Race being directly invoked and that the only one to do so while campaigning in the state was Republican Vice Presidential nominee Henry Cabot Lodge Jr. On September 16, Lodge spoke in Bradenton not long after Hurricane Donna and expressed his hopes about developing a satellite to monitor tropical cyclones. Babish argued that the Space Race may not have swayed Floridians much is due to their concerns about other issues and the American space program being new, with Alan Shepard's historic sub-orbital flight with Project Mercury not occurring until May 1961.

Among the most important issues to Florida voters was civil rights. Because registered Democrats outnumbered Republicans in the state by about 1.3 million, Nixon needed to win a significant percentage of Democrats. A 1988 book by Dewey W. Grantham entitled The Life and Death of the Solid South: A Political History posited that Nixon's performance across the South "reflected the accumulating distrust of the national Democratic Party felt by many white southerners, a distrust that was exacerbated by the civil rights movement and by Kennedy's Catholicism." Some Democratic politicians in the South refused to support the national party platform and by extension, the Kennedy-Johnson ticket. Even Kennedy's campaign chair in the Southern United States, Senator George Smathers of Florida, while 1960 Democratic nominee for governor of Florida C. Farris Bryant distanced himself from Kennedy and the party platform.

Although Richard Nixon won Florida's 10 electoral votes, Kennedy prevailed in the 1960 United States presidential election. Kennedy used La Querida in Palm Beach, Florida, as his Winter White House, where he also wrote at least part of his inaugural address and announced several cabinet appointments. Four years later, Lyndon B. Johnson, Kennedy's running mate in 1960, won Florida in another close election. After Nixon's defeat, he successfully campaigned for President of the United States and again carried the state in 1968 and 1972.
