= Nina Marković =

Croatian-American physicist

- Education: University of Zagreb (B.S., 1993); University of Minnesota (Ph.D., 1998)
- Awards: Sloan Research Fellowship (2004); National Science Foundation CAREER Award (2006)
- Scientific career
- Fields: Quantum mechanics; Quantum computing; Superconductivity; Nanostructures
- Workplaces: Delft University of Technology; Harvard University; Johns Hopkins University; Goucher College
- Thesis: Transport properties and quantum phase transitions in ultrathin films of metals (1998)
- Doctoral advisor: Allen Goldman

Nina Marković is a Croatian-American physicist. Her work focuses on quantum transport in low-dimensional systems, superconductivity, nanostructures, and quantum computing. She received a Sloan Research Fellowship in 2004. Marković worked at Delft University of Technology, Harvard University, and Johns Hopkins University before joining the Goucher College Department of Physics and Astronomy in 2015.

== Education ==
In 1993, Marković earned a Bachelor of Science in Physics from the University of Zagreb under advisor Boran Leontić. At University of Minnesota in 1998, she earned a doctorate in physics. She completed her thesis titled Transport properties and quantum phase transitions in ultrathin films of metals under her doctoral advisor Allen Goldman and received the Aneesur Rahman Award for best thesis. From 1998 to 2000, Marković conducted postdoctoral research at Delft University of Technology with Herre van der Zant and Hans Mooij (de). She was a postdoctoral fellow at Harvard University where she conducted research with Michael Tinkham from 2000 to 2002.

== Career ==
Marković joined the faculty at Johns Hopkins University as an assistant professor of physics and astronomy in 2003. She was awarded a Sloan Research Fellowship by the Alfred P. Sloan Foundation in 2004. In August 2004, she was awarded $99,999 from the National Science Foundation to conduct a study on quantum entanglement of electrons. She won a $500,000 National Science Foundation's Early CAREER Development Award to pursue research on electrical properties in nanometer scale materials in 2006. Marković was promoted to associate professor at Johns Hopkins in 2009. In August 2011, she was awarded $360,000 from NSF to conduct a study on Spin Control in One-Dimensional Quantum Dots. In the fall of 2015, Marković joined the Goucher College Department of Physics and Astronomy as an associate professor in 2015. In August 2015, she was awarded $430,371 from NSF to conduct a study on Designing Quantum Matter with Superconducting Nanowires.

She is a fellow of the American Physical Society and a member of the Materials Research Society.
