= Jane Goldman (disambiguation) =

Jane Goldman is an English screenwriter, author and producer.

Jane Goldman may also refer to:

- Jane Goldman (real estate investor)
- Jane Goldman (speed skater)
