= Alvin C. Powers =

American physician-scientist

- Born: United States
- Education: University of Virginia (BA); University of Tennessee Health Science Center (MD)
- Known for: Diabetes research; pancreatic islet biology
- Awards: William S. Middleton Award (2023); Naomi Berrie Award (2019)
- Scientific career
- Fields: Medicine, Molecular physiology
- Workplaces: Vanderbilt University Medical Center; VA Tennessee Valley Healthcare System
- Website: https://www.powersbrissovaresearch.org/

Alvin C. Powers is an American physician-scientist and endocrinologist known for his research in the genetics of diabetes and related diseases. He is the Joe C. Davis Chair in Biomedical Science and Professor of Medicine, Molecular Physiology and Biophysics at Vanderbilt University. He also serves as the Director of the Vanderbilt Diabetes Center, the Chief of the Vanderbilt Division of Diabetes, Endocrinology, and Metabolism, and the Director of the Vanderbilt Diabetes Research and Training Center. Power's research has been funded by the National Institutes of Health, the VA Research Service, the JDRF, and the American Diabetes Association.

As a physician, he is a affiliated with the Vanderbilt University Medical Center and the VA Tennessee Valley Healthcare System. He is listed as one of "America’s Top Doctors" by Castle Connolly Medical. He is also member of the Association of American Physicians and as a Fellow of the American Association for the Advancement of Science.

== Education ==
Powers did his undergraduate in arts at the University of Virginia and obtained his medical degree from the University of Tennessee Center for the Health Sciences. He then trained in internal medicine at Duke University Medical Center, followed by training in the Endocrinology and Diabetes at the Joslin Diabetes Center, the Massachusetts General Hospital, and Harvard Medical School.

== Research ==
Powers’s research investigates the cellular and molecular mechanisms underlying insulin secretion by pancreatic islet β cells and the pathogenesis of diabetes. The laboratory employs a wide array of methodologies—including genetically modified mouse models, adenovirus-mediated gene transfer, transplantation of human islets into immunodeficient mice, confocal microscopy, radioimmunoassays, and immunocytochemistry—and collaborates with vascular biologists, developmental biologists, biomedical engineers, and transplant researchers to integrate multidisciplinary insights.

Powers is a member of the National Institute of Diabetes and Digestive and Kidney Diseases (NIDDK)–supported Human Islet Research Network, contributing to multi-institution efforts to translate fundamental discoveries into clinical approaches for diabetes treatment. He has published over 200 peer-reviewed manuscripts.

== Awards and recognition ==
- Albert Renold Award (2024)
- William S. Middleton Award (2023)
- Outstanding Alumnus Award Winner (2021)
- Outstanding Educator Award (2020)
- Naomi Berrie Award for Outstanding Achievement in Diabetes Research (2019)
- VA Career Development Award (1991)
