= Brooklyn Heights Seminary =

Private school for girls in Brooklyn, NY (1851-1933)

Coordinates: 40°41′40.1″N 73°59′37.8″W

The Brooklyn Heights Seminary was a private preparatory school for girls in Brooklyn, New York. At the time of its closure, it was the oldest continuously operating school in the borough.

== Early history ==
The Brooklyn Heights Seminary was founded by Professor Alonzo Gray in 1851. It was initially founded as an offshoot of the Brooklyn Female Academy (est. 1845), which eventually became the Packer Collegiate Institute. The school was originally located at 88 Montague Place, now known as Montague Street, in Brooklyn Heights, and later at 138–140 Montague Street.

The original faculty consisted of Professor Alonzo Gray, Miss Arethusa Hall, and twelve other teachers. 166 pupils were enrolled in the school's first year. The members of the school's board of visitors included many well-known Brooklynites of the time, including Henry Ward Beecher. Reverend Richard S. Storrs lectured at the school during its first year and later served as acting principal after Professor Alonzo Gray died in March 1861.

In September 1861, the school was purchased by Dr. Charles E. West, who served as principal until his retirement in 1889. His assistant principal was Miss Mary A. Brigham. Miss Clara R. Colton took over leadership of the school in 1889, in joint partnership with Misses Katherine S. Woodward, Isabel D. Hubbard, and Cornelia H Fulton. Miss Colton retired in 1903.

== Incorporation and later history ==
Upon Miss Colton's retirement in 1903, a committee composed of the school's alumnae and patrons collaborated with the Brooklyn Heights Seminary Club to preserve and perpetuate the school, which was at imminent risk of closure. The committee sought to reform the institution and implement "a new and broader policy" for its pedagogical model. James E. Russell of the Teachers College of New York was appointed Dean of the seminary to assist in the school's transition.

The Brooklyn Heights Seminary was legally incorporated in 1903, and a new Board of Trustees was established with Teunis G. Bergen as President. Miss Ellen Yale Stevens was appointed as Principal, and the Chittenden mansion at 18 Pierrepont Street, formerly the residence of Simeon B. Chittenden, was leased to house the school. In 1906, the Board of Trustees purchased the Chittenden property, and in 1907, a three-story extension provided for additional classroom space and a new gymnasium facility. The extension was named Stanton Hall, in memory of George A. Stanton, a former trustee and patron of the school.

In 1914, Miss Florence Greer was appointed assistant principal. Miss Greer later assumed the role of Principal in 1923 and held this position until her death on July 20, 1933.

The school ceased to operate after Miss Greer's death. In 1934, its historic school building was demolished for the construction of new apartment buildings.

== Notable people ==
=== Alumnae ===
- Helen Twelvetrees
- Gertrude Niesen
- Elisabeth Achelis
- Helen Appleton Read
- Elizabeth W. Greenwood
- Josephine Perfect Bay
- Lavinia Goodell
- Anna Olcott Commelin
- Augusta Lewis Troup

=== Faculty ===
- Mary A. Brigham
- Katharine Bement Davis
- Juliet Greer Bridwell
