= Anna Olcott Commelin =

American poet

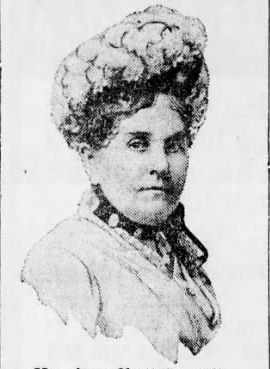
- Born: 1841
- Died: July 1, 1924 (aged 82–83)
- Occupations: Writer, poet
- Known for: Articles and poetry

Anna Olcott Commelin (1841 – July 1, 1924) was an American writer and poet.

== Early life and career ==
Commelin was born in Brooklyn, New York, where she also attended the Brooklyn Heights Seminary. She wrote poems for Index, the Open Court, the Christian Register, and the magazine Woman. Commelin published a small collection of her poems in 1889. In 1913, she wrote an article for The Brooklyn Daily Eagle about the rights of women.

She wrote the story Not In It which is about her belief that the rich should help the poor. Her poems To My Valentine and Easter Glory were printed and bound with decorated covers that are tied with either a cord or ribbon. An 1895 review by The Daily Republican of her work Of Such is the Kingdom of Heaven and other poems stated, "The volume is a rare exhibition of bookmaking art in the six essentials of beauty, paper, type, binding, cover, and design".

== Death ==
Commelin died on July 1, 1924, and left behind an estate that was estimated as worth more than $5,000. Her sister and brother received the estate, with her daughter-in-law receiving the right to publish her poems and manuscripts.
