= Juliet Greer =

American home economist

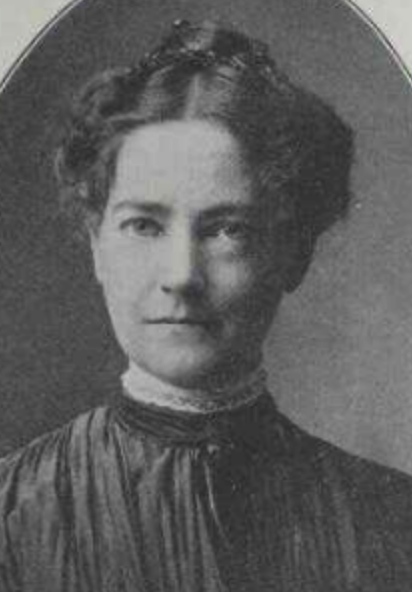
- Juliet Greer, from the 1908 yearbook of Oregon State University
- Born: December 28, 1871; Rochester, Pennsylvania
- Died: December 12, 1942; Woodford Forest, Virginia
- Other names: Juliette Greer, Juliet G. Bridwell
- Occupation(s): Science educator, college dean, home economist

Juliet Greer Bridwell (December 28, 1871 – December 12, 1942) was an American home economist and college professor. She was dean of the School of Domestic Science and Art at Oregon State University from 1908 to 1911.

== Early life and education ==
Greer was born in Rochester, Pennsylvania, the daughter of Howard Greer and Aberilla Ecoff Greer. She graduated from Vassar College, where she was president of the class of 1895. She pursued further studies at the University of Chicago and at Columbia University. Her youngest sister, Florence Greer, was a fellow Vassar alumna, and a noted educator as principal of Brooklyn Heights Seminary.

== Career ==
Greer taught physics and biology at Pratt Institute from 1898 to 1908. She joined the faculty at Oregon State University (then known as Oregon Agricultural College, or OAC), as dean of the School of Domestic Science and Art, in 1908. She resigned from OAC in 1911, along with her four assistants. She was succeeded as dean at OAC by Henrietta W. Calvin.

In 1916, she joined the faculty at Brooklyn Heights Seminary, as a science teacher. She also read one of her husband's professional papers at the Pacific Slope Association for the Advancement of Science meeting in San Diego that year. She was still associated with the Brooklyn school in the early 1930s, before her sister's death and the school's closure in 1933.

In the 1930s, Bridwell was an officer of the Progressive Citizens of Georgetown.

== Personal life ==
Greer lived in Los Angeles, caring for her ailing mother, before she married entomologist John Colburn Bridwell in 1912. They had a daughter, also named Juliet Greer Bridwell, born in 1918 in Honolulu, when Bridwell was 43 and her husband was assistant entomologist at the Hawaii Board of Agriculture and Forestry. She died in 1942, at age 70, from a heart attack, at her home near Washington, D.C.
