= Genuit =

UK manufacturer of plastic piping systems

Genuit Group plc
- Formerly: Hamsard 3054 Limited (2007–2014); Polypipe Group Limited (21–28 Mar 2014); Polypipe Group plc (2014–2021)
- Traded as: LSE: GEN; FTSE 250 component
- Industry: Piping systems manufacture
- Founded: 1980
- Headquarters: 4 Victoria Place, Holbeck, Leeds, LS11 5AE, England, United Kingdom
- Number of locations: 18 sites
- Area served: United Kingdom; Mainland Europe; Middle East
- Key people: Kevin Boyd (Chairman); Joe Vorih (CEO); Tim Pullen (CFO)
- Products: Water and air management systems
- Revenue: ▲£602.1 million (2025)
- Operating income: ▲£94.4 million (2025)
- Net income: ▲£45.2 million (2025)
- Number of employees: 3,221 (2026)
- Website: genuitgroup.com

Genuit Group plc, formerly Polypipe Group, is a manufacturer of plastic piping systems, for use in the residential, commercial, civils and infrastructure sectors. The piping systems are used for a variety of applications including drainage, plumbing, water supply, water management, cable management, heating and ventilation. The company is listed on the London Stock Exchange and is a constituent of the FTSE 250 Index.

== History ==
The company was established as Polypipe by Kevin McDonald (a former plumber) and Geoff Harrison in 1980. In October 1995 the company bought Sud Ouest Plastiques (of France) for £2.1m, in January 1997 it bought TDI for £3.1m and in November 1997 it bought Gabo Systemtechnik for £6m. Then in July 1998 the company bought Domus Ducting (renamed Polypipe Ventilation) for £4.7m and in January 1999 it bought Pagette Sanitar Produktions (of Germany) for £9m.

In March 1999 the company was bought by IMI for £337m; Kevin MacDonald made £56m from this deal and Geoffrey Harrison made £12.5m. IMI sold Polypipe to Castle Harlan (of the United States), a private equity company, for £293m in September 2005. In May 2007 it bought Terrain, a PVC piping business in Aylesford in Kent. Then in August 2007, a management buyout took control of the company from the private equity company, in a deal funded by Bank of Scotland Integrated Finance. In February 2010 the company bought Silavent, a ventilation manufacturer.

In April 2014, Polypipe was the subject of an initial public offering on the London Stock Exchange. Then in November 2014, Polypipe acquired the Ferrob Ventilation business. In February 2015, Polypipe acquired Surestop, a business producing an alternative product to the brass stopcock, and in August 2015 Polypipe acquired Nuaire, a ventilation systems manufacturer.

It was announced in May 2017 that Martin Payne will succeed David Hall as the CEO following his retirement.

The company changed its name from Polypipe to Genuit Group in March 2021.

== Operations ==
The head office is in Leeds, UK. Its businesses are located as follows:

- Polypipe Building Products – based in Edlington, Doncaster
- Polypipe Civils and Green Urbanisation – based in Loughborough and Horncastle
- Polypipe Building Services – based in Aylesford, Kent
- Polypipe Ventilation – based in Caerphilly
- Robimatic – based in Kirk Sandall
- Polypipe Italy – based in Monleone di Cicagna, Genova, Italy
- Alderburgh – based in Rochdale
- Polypipe Middle East – based in Dubai, United Arab Emirates, with offices also in Doha, Qatar
- Surestop – based in Birmingham
- Manthorpe Building Products – based in Ripley, Derbyshire
- Nuaire Ventilation – based in Caerphilly
- Nu-heat – based in Devon
- Domus Ventilation – based in Caerphilly

== See also ==
- Water Regulations Advisory Scheme
- British Board of Agrément
