= Diane Goldman Kemper =

American real estate investor (born 1946)

- Born: 1946 (age 79–80)
- Spouse: Kenneth D. Kemper
- Parent(s): Sol Goldman (1917–1987); Lillian Schuman Goldman (1922–2002)
- Family: Allan H. Goldman (brother); Jane Goldman (sister); Amy Goldman Fowler (sister); Lloyd Goldman (cousin)

Diane Goldman Kemper (born 1946) is an American real estate investor and philanthropist. Through Solil Management, Goldman owns one of the largest private real estate portfolios in the United States, consisting of 400 properties mainly in New York City. Solil's portfolio includes landmarks such as the land under the Olympic Tower and the Cartier Building, The Peninsula Hotel New York and 17% of the land under the World Trade Center complex. In March 2022, Forbes estimated her net worth at US$2.8 billion.

== Biography ==
Kemper was born in 1946 to a Jewish family, the daughter of Lillian (née Schuman) and Sol Goldman.

She attended C.W. Post College and the New York School of Interior Design.

She has three siblings: Allan H. Goldman, Jane Goldman, and Amy Goldman Fowler. Her father was the largest non-institutional real estate investor in New York City in the 1980s, owning a portfolio of nearly 1900 commercial and residential properties. After her father's death, she and her two sisters engaged in litigation with their mother over his assets; their mother subsequently received 1/3rd of their father's estate. Her sister Jane Goldman manages the remaining real estate assets via the firm Solil Management. Her cousin, Lloyd Goldman, is also a notable real-estate investor in New York City.

In 1971, she married attorney Kenneth D. Kemper in a Jewish ceremony in Manhattan.

Kemper primarily donates to education and health.
