= Goldmann =

Goldmann is the surname of several people:

- Erich Goldmann, German ice hockey player
- Friedrich Goldmann (1941–2009), German composer and conductor
- Hans Goldmann (1899–1991), Swiss ophthalmologist
- Lucien Goldmann, French philosopher and sociologist
- Maximilian Goldmann, real name of Max Reinhardt, Austrian theatre director
- Nahum Goldmann, former president of the World Jewish Congress
- Ulrike Goldmann, singer for German band Blutengel
- Stefan Goldmann (born 1978), German-Bulgarian DJ and composer of electronic music

It can also refer to:

- Goldmann (publisher), large publishing house in Germany

== See also ==
- Goldman (disambiguation)
