= Lloyd Goldman =

American real estate developer (born 1958)

Lloyd Goldman jr
- Born: 1958 (age 67–68)
- Occupation: real estate investor
- Known for: founder of BLDG Management
- Spouse: Victoria Goldman
- Children: Regina Goldman Krumholz; Robert Goldman
- Parent(s): Irving Goldman; Joyce Goldman
- Family: Allan H. Goldman (cousin); Jane Goldman (cousin); Amy Goldman Fowler (cousin); Diane Goldman Kemper (cousin); Sol Goldman (uncle)

Lloyd Goldman is a New York real estate developer and founder of BLDG Management.

== Biography ==
Goldman is the son of real estate investor Irving Goldman. His uncle, Sol Goldman, was one of the most prominent real estate investors in New York City during the 1980s owning a portfolio of nearly 600 commercial and residential properties. Goldman inherited a portfolio of New York City real estate. In the 1990s, he focused on buying distressed properties at government auctions. In 1984, he founded BLDG Management which owns over 250 residential and commercial properties nationwide and controls over $2 billion in real estate.

In early 2001, Goldman partnered with Larry Silverstein and Joseph Cayre to purchase the lease of the World Trade Center from the Port Authority of New York and New Jersey for $3.2 billion. The partnership was required to post $800 million in fees and down payments to win the deal. Goldman and Cayre posted a combined $110 million; Silverstein contributed $14 million; Frank Lowy's Westfield America contributed $127 million (Westfield controlled the retail mall at the trade center); and $563 million was borrowed from GMAC Financing. Goldman was to receive 25% of the management fees. In 2006, Goldman's share was increased to 50% and he took over control of the project from Silverstein in 2016.

In 2004, Goldman was an investor in a group that purchased the 110-story Sears Tower in Chicago for $840 million with partners Joseph Moinian, Joseph Chetrit, and Jeffrey Feil, eventually changing the name to the Willis Tower in 2009. In 2009, he partnered with Jeffrey Feil and Stanley Chera to purchase the retail space in The St. Regis Hotel for $117 million; in 2012, they sold it for $380 million. In late 2018, Goldman built BLDG Management's first residential building in New York City.

Goldman serves on M&T Bank’s New York City Director’s Advisory Council and Mortgage Investment Council.

== Philanthropy ==
In 2012, Goldman was elected the president of American Associates, Ben-Gurion University of the Negev (AABGU). He is trustee of the Joyce and Irving Goldman Family Foundation, and is involved with Conservation International, The Educational Alliance, and the We Are Family Foundation. Goldman serves as a trustee of the North Shore-Long Island Jewish Health System, and he and his wife Victoria funded a pediatric allergy and respiratory care and research wing at the National Jewish Health center.

== Personal life ==
Goldman lives in Manhattan with his wife Victoria, an education consultant and author of the Manhattan Family Guide to Private Schools. Their daughter, Regina Goldman, is an assistant district attorney for Middlesex County, Massachusetts. In 2012, she married Richard Krumholz at the Central Synagogue in New York.
