= Rachel Goldman =

Professor of Materials Science and Engineering

Rachel Goldman is an American scientist. She is professor of materials science and engineering, electrical engineering and computer science, and physics at the University of Michigan where she has been a faculty member since 1997. She also serves as the associate director of applied physics at the University of Michigan since 2010.

== Research ==
Goldman studies atomic-scale design of electronic materials with a focus on the mechanisms of strain relaxation, alloy formation and diffusion, and correlations between microstructure and electronic, magnetic, and optical properties of semiconductor films, nanostructures, and heterostructures.

== Education ==
Goldman received her Ph.D. from University of San Diego in 1995. She went on to become a post-doctoral researcher at Carnegie Mellon University 1996–97. She received the Augustus Anson Whitney fellowship from the Radcliffe Institute for Advanced Study at Harvard from 2005 to 2006.

== Organisational affiliations ==
She was inducted into the Sigma Xi Research Honor society in 2008. She was elected a Fellow of the American Physical Society in 2012 for contributions to the fundamental understanding of strain relaxation, alloy formation, and diffusion, and their applications to nanostructure processing. She was also elected Fellow of the American Vacuum Society in 2012, where she had previously received the Peter Mark Memorial Award in 2002. She currently serves as the chair of the American Physical Society Division of Materials Physics. In 2021, Goldman was elected Fellow of the American Association for the Advancement of Science (AAAS).
