= Ronald Goldman (researcher) =

Australian psychologist

Ronald Goldman is an Australian psychology professor and author.

== Bibliography ==
- Religious Thinking from Childhood to Adolescence (1964)
- Readiness for Religion (1968)
- Children's sexual thinking (1982)
