= Exterran Corporation =

American corporation that engages in natural gas production

Exterran Corporation, now Enerflex Ltd.
- Company type: Public
- Traded as: NYSE: EXH (2015)
- Industry: Gas Equipment & Services
- Founded: 1954-2023
- Website: enerflex.com

Exterran Corporation was acquired by Enerflex Ltd. on October 13, 2022. Enerflex is an integrated global provider of energy infrastructure and energy transition solutions. With enhanced scale and capabilities, Enerflex serves customers in key natural gas, energy transition, and water markets, which will enhance long-term shareholder value through sustainable improvements in efficiency, profitability, and cash flow generation.

== History ==
Exterran Corporation was set up in 2007 and operated as a public company until it was acquired by Enerflex Ltd. on October 13, 2022.

On Nov. 4, 2015, Exterran Corporation announced the completion of its previously announced spin-off from Exterran Corporation and emerged as an independent, publicly traded company. Exterran Corporation which was formerly the international services and global fabrication businesses of Exterran Corporation is involved in natural gas compression, production and processing products and services. Exterran was formed when Universal Compression (1954) merged with Hanover (1990) in 2007. Universal Compression went public in 2000 and then acquired Weatherford, Global and Gas Compression Services, KCI, LCM and TCS. Hanover acquired APSI and POI to enter the gas processing business, and reorganized into GBU concept before the merger.
