= John K. Castle =

American businessman

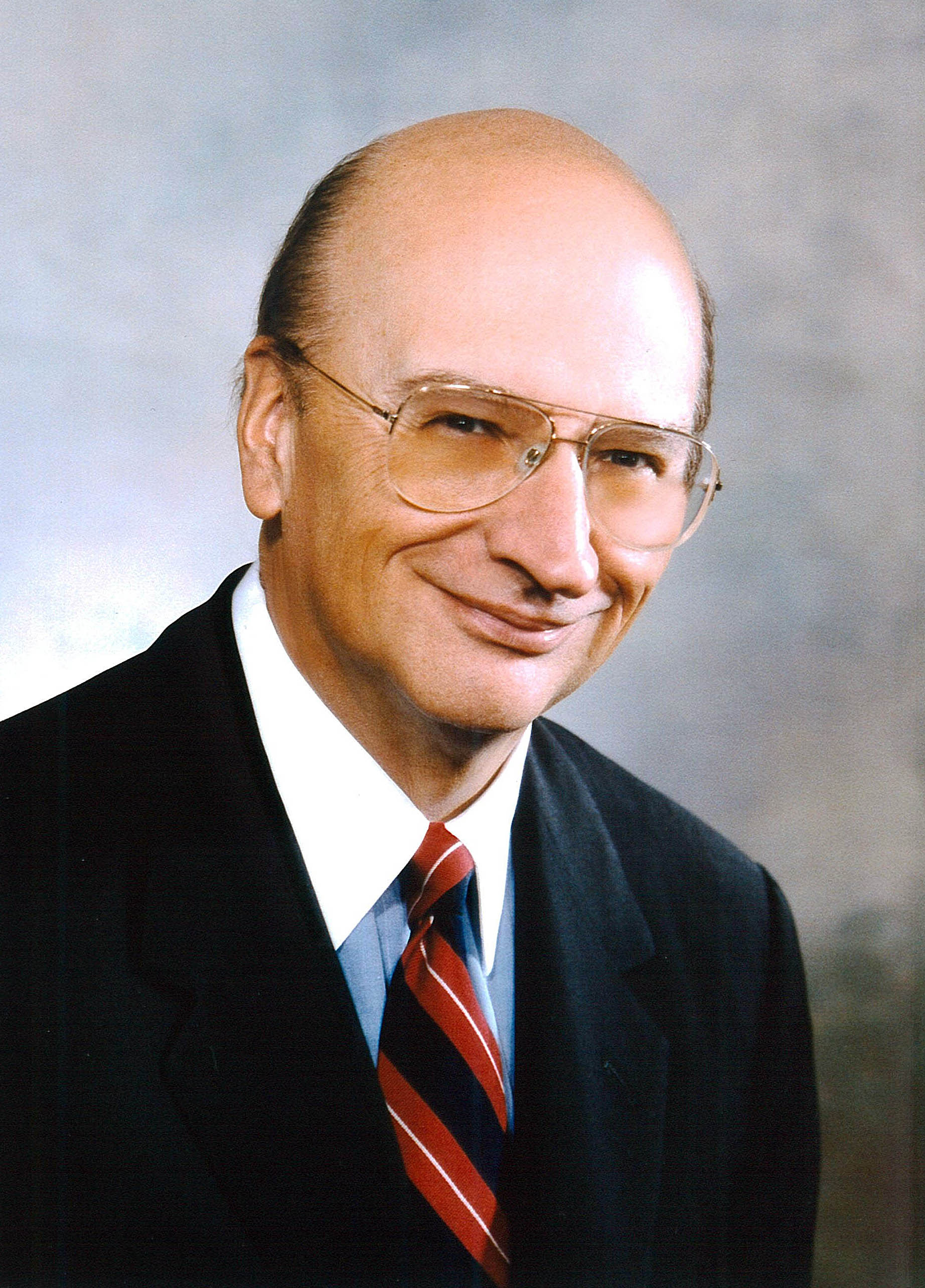
- John K Castle of Castle Harlan

Personal details
- Born: John K Castle

John K. Castle is chairman and chief executive officer of Castle Harlan, Inc., the chairman of Branford Castle, Inc. and the co-founder of Castle Connolly Medical.

== Castle Connolly Medical Limited ==
Castle Connolly Medical Ltd. has historically published New York's Top Doctors and America’s Top Doctors. Castle Connolly was sold to Everyday Health Group in December 2018.

== Career ==
With his expertise in Science, Mathematics and Economics, Castle co-founded the institutional private equity market in the late 1960s. Throughout his career, he has been the owner and controller of the following corporations: Delaware Management, Ethan Allen, Ames True Temper and several restaurant chains (including Perkins, Marie Callender's and Morton's Steakhouses. He has also served as a director of the Equitable Life Assurance Society of the US.

In 1986, he launched Castle Harlan. Prior to that he was president and CEO of Donaldson, Lufkin & Jenrette, Inc. and a director of the Equitable Life Assurance Society of the US.

In 1969 – as chairman of DLJ's Merchant Banking and Sprout Group – Castle was a pioneer in the promotion of the use of limited partnerships as a means for pension funds and other large institutions to invest private capital into companies.

== Philanthropy and awards ==
In 2015, Castle was the recipient of the 2015 Peter Hilton Founder’s Award. He was the 2017 Happy Warrior Award recipient of The Alfred E. Smith Memorial Foundation.

Castle has endowed one Associate/Assistant Professorship in Economics and five graduate fellowships at The Massachusetts Institute of Technology.

== Education ==
Castle has a Bachelor’s Degree from the Massachusetts Institute of Technology, and an MBA from Harvard Business School where he was a Baker Scholar with High Distinction. He has been awarded four Honorary Doctorate degrees of Humane Letters. One was from Franklin Pierce University.

== Palm Beach residence ==
In 1995, Castle purchased and restored the Palm Beach estate formerly owned by the Kennedy family (best known as John F. Kennedy’s Winter White House). In May 2015, Castle and his wife, Marianne, sold the estate for $31 million to TGS Florida LLC, managed by Jane H. Goldman of New York.

== Personal life ==
John K. Castle is married to Marianne with whom he has three sons, Dr. James Castle from Highland Park, Illinois, William Castle from Alexandria, Virginia, and John S. Castle.
