= Sol Goldman =

American real estate developer (1917–1987)

- Born: Usher Selig Goldman; September 2, 1917; Brooklyn, New York, US
- Died: October 18, 1987 (aged 70); Manhattan, New York, US
- Spouse: Lillian Schuman (1922–2002) (m. 1940)
- Children: Allan H. Goldman; Diane Goldman Kemper; Amy P. Goldman (b. 1954); Jane Goldman

Sol Goldman (born Usher Selig Goldman, September 2, 1917 – October 18, 1987) was an American real estate investor and philanthropist. Goldman was the founder of Solil Management, a real estate investment firm he founded in the 1950s with his business partner, Alex DiLorenzo. Goldman was widely considered the most prominent non-institutional real estate investor in New York City in the 1970s and 1980s. At its peak in the 1970s, Goldman's portfolio consisted of nearly 1,900 commercial and residential properties, including the Chrysler Building. At the time of his death in 1987, Goldman owned the largest private real estate portfolio in New York City with more than 600 properties, worth over $1 billion.

== Early life ==
Goldman was born in Brooklyn, New York and raised in a Jewish family, the son of Fannie and Charles Goldman. His father owned a grocery store. Goldman briefly attended Brooklyn College, before turning to real estate during the Great Depression. At age 16, he purchased his first of many foreclosed properties by raising money from his neighbors.

== Career ==
In the 1950s, he partnered with Alex DiLorenzo Jr. Together they were very active purchasers through the 1950s and 1960s and their portfolio included the Chrysler Building which they bought in 1960. Although the 1970s were difficult—he lost the Chrysler Building to foreclosure, and DiLorenzo died in 1975—Goldman continued to invest, purchasing more than 600 buildings in the subsequent years via his company Solil Management (named after Sol and his wife, Lil). Goldman was known for holding onto his properties and rarely selling, preferring instead to sign tenants to long-term ground leases (typically 99 years) where the tenants pay an annual rent to Goldman but are responsible for taxes and upkeep of buildings on the properties.

The Sol Goldman Pancreatic Cancer Research Center at Johns Hopkins University is named in his honor, following a gift of $10 million. The Sol Goldman Pool at Red Hook Park was named for him in 1991 after a trust, set up following his death, donated $2 million to fund the operation of several public pools during a municipal budget shortfall.

== Personal life ==
In 1941, he married Lillian Schuman, who was also Jewish. They had four children; Allan H. Goldman, Diane Goldman Kemper, Amy P. Goldman and Jane Goldman. His wife and three daughters engaged in litigation over his assets with his wife eventually receiving 33% of his estate. His nephew, Lloyd Goldman, is also a notable real-estate investor in New York City.
