= Jane Goldman (real estate investor) =

American investor (born 1955)

- Born: 1955 (age 70–71)
- Education: Masters School; TASIS Switzerland; Manhattanville College
- Spouse: Benjamin H. Lewis (m. 1979)
- Parent(s): Sol Goldman (1917–1987); Lillian Schuman Goldman (1922–2002)
- Family: Allan H. Goldman (brother); Diane Goldman Kemper (sister); Amy Goldman Fowler (sister); Lloyd Goldman (cousin)

Jane Goldman (born 1955) is an American billionaire real estate investor. She is the co-chair and co-owner (alongside her three siblings) of Solil Management, a New York City-based real estate investment company. She is the youngest daughter of real estate investor Sol Goldman. In August 2022, Forbes estimated her net worth at US$2.9 billion.

== Biography ==
Goldman was born in 1955 to a Jewish family, the daughter of Lillian (née Schuman) and Sol Goldman. She is the youngest of four siblings: Allan H. Goldman, Diane Goldman Kemper, and Amy Goldman Fowler. Her father was the largest non-institutional real estate investor in New York City in the 1980s, owning a portfolio of nearly 1,900 commercial and residential properties. She attended the Masters School, the American School in Switzerland, and graduated from Manhattanville College.

After her father's death, she and her two sisters engaged in litigation with their mother over his assets; their mother subsequently received 1/3rd of their father's estate. She and her late brother, Allan Goldman, managed the remaining real estate assets via the firm Solil Management. Her cousin, Lloyd Goldman, is also a notable real-estate investor in New York City.

In 1979, she married Dr. Benjamin H. Lewis in a Jewish ceremony at the family home in New York City.

== Career ==
As principal of Solil Management, Jane carries of portfolio of over 400 properties that include high-end apartments on the Upper East Side, a block of land in Midtown Manhattan that includes the Olympic Tower and the Cartier Mansion, and the Peninsula Hotel, and a 17% stake in the World Trade Center developments in lower Manhattan.

In June 2020, Goldman sold her home, the former Kennedy family compound in Palm Beach, Florida, for approximately $70 million. She had purchased it for $31 million in 2015 from Castle Harlan CEO and chairman John K. Castle.

In 2023, Jane was sued along with her sister Diane by their nephew Steven and their sister Amy in both New York and Delaware. The Delaware case is presumed completed while the New York case is ongoing. Jane has described the cases as a shakedown.

Forbes reported that Goldman oversees a portfolio that includes at least 400 properties.
