= Marvin G. Goldman =

American aviation historian (born 1939)

Marvin G. Goldman (born June 1, 1939) is a New York City-based lawyer, aviation historian, and the world's largest collector of memorabilia related to El Al, Israel's flag carrier airline.

Goldman is the author of two books on the subject:

- El Al: Star in the Sky (1990) ISBN 978-0962673009
- El Al: Israel's Flying Star (2009)
