= Goldman, Missouri =

Unincorporated community in Missouri, U.S.

Coordinates: 38.297277°N 90.521513°W

Goldman is an unincorporated community in Jefferson County, Missouri, United States, approximately 25 miles south of St. Louis, and five miles north of the county courthouse at Hillsboro. Goldman is located on Old Lemay Ferry Road, an old trade route connecting Hillsboro and St. Louis.

A post office called Goldman was established in 1895, and remained in operation until 1905. The community has the name of the Goldman brothers, local merchants.

Goldman is adjacent to the historic Sandy Creek Covered Bridge, one of only four covered bridges in Missouri and a state historic site.

The town is located near the site where Missouri Governor Mel Carnahan and two other people died on October 16, 2000, in an airplane crash.
