= Josephine Perfect Bay =

American financier and businessperson (1900–1962)

Josephine Holt Perfect Bay
- Born: Josephine Holt Perfect; August 10, 1900; Anamosa, Iowa, U.S.
- Died: August 6, 1962 (aged 61); New York, New York, U.S.
- Known for: First woman to head a member firm of the New York Stock Exchange
- Spouses: Charles Ulrick Bay; Paul Michael Iogolevitch

Josephine Holt Perfect Bay (August 10, 1900 – August 6, 1962) was an American financier and businessperson. She notably became the first woman to head a constituent firm of the New York Stock Exchange.

== Biography ==
Josephine Perfect Bay (née Perfect) was born in Anamosa, Iowa, in 1900 to a real estate broker and his wife. Her family moved to Brooklyn, New York, when she was young, and she was educated at Brooklyn Heights Seminary and attended Colorado College from 1918 to 1919.

She married her first husband Charles Ulrick Bay, a businessman and Office of Strategic Services officer, in 1942. Ulrick Bay went on to become the United States ambassador to Norway before dying in 1955. At the time of his death, he held a 71% stake in A.M. Kidder & Co, a New York brokerage firm. In accordance with the rules of the New York Stock Exchange (NYSE), this required Charles' beneficiary to either sell their shares or assume his former role in the firm.

Rather than divest her stake, Josephine Bay chose to head the firm, and in 1956 became the president and chairman of A.M. Kidder & Co. In doing so, she became the first woman to lead a member firm of the NYSE. She would also serve as chairman of the board and chief executive officer of American Export Lines.

In 1959, she married Paul Michael Iogolevitch, also known as Capton Michael Paul, a Russian émigré who had become a successful banker. She remained the head of A.M. Kidder and chairman of the board of American Export Lines until her death in 1962.

The Josephine Bay Paul Center at the University of Chicago is named in her honor.
