= Amy Goldman Fowler =

American conservationist (born 1954)

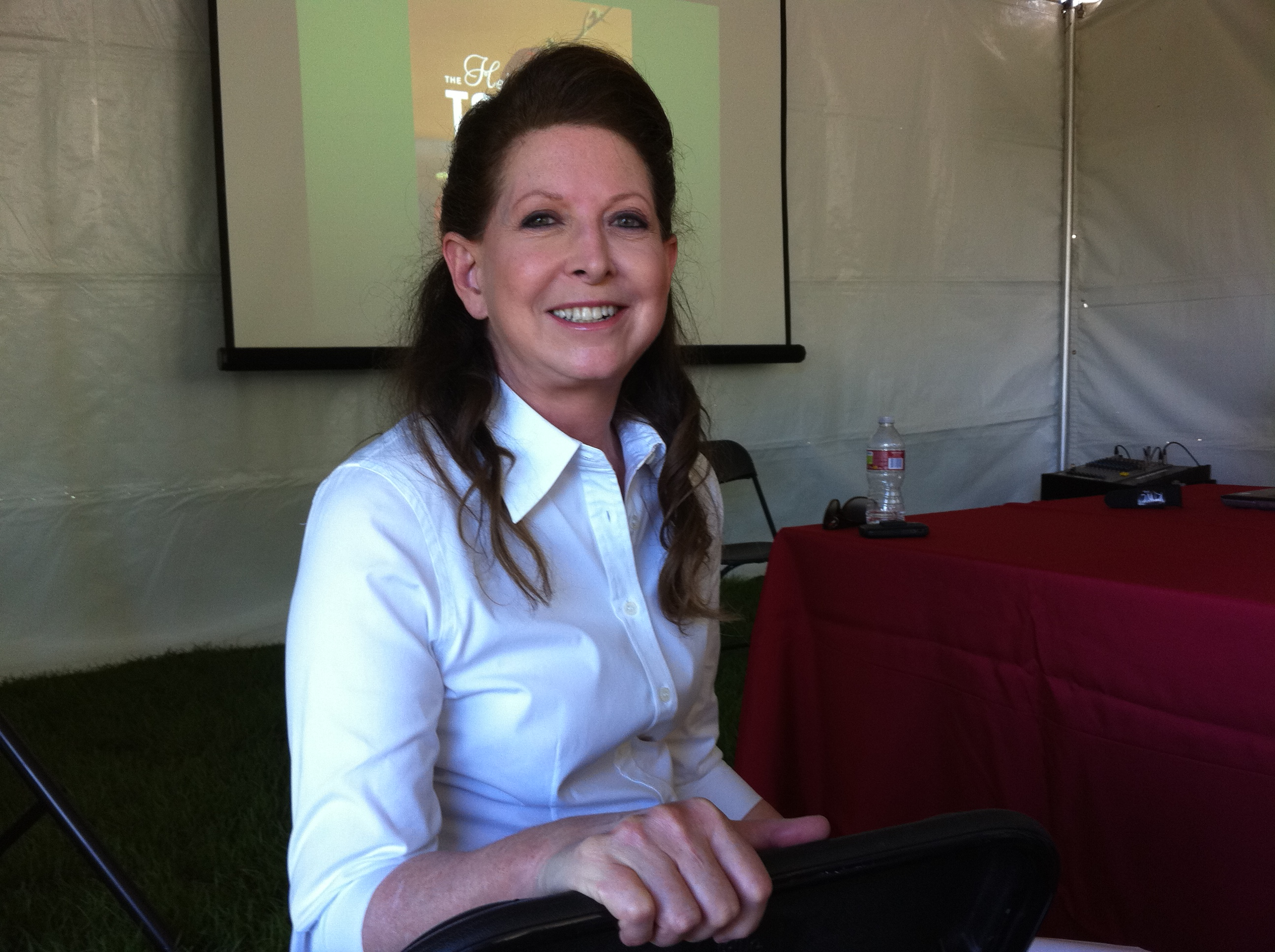
- Goldman in 2010
- Born: 1954 (age 71–72)
- Spouse: Cary Fowler (m. 2012)
- Parent(s): Sol Goldman; Lillian Schuman Goldman
- Family: Allan H. Goldman (brother); Diane Goldman Kemper (sister); Jane Goldman (sister); Lloyd Goldman (cousin)
- Website: amygoldmanfowler.com

Amy Goldman Fowler (born 1954) is an American billionaire heiress, gardener, author, artist, philanthropist, and advocate for seed saving and heirloom fruits and vegetables. She is one of the foremost heirloom plant conservationists in the US. Goldman has been called "perhaps the world's premier vegetable gardener" by Gregory Long, president emeritus of The New York Botanical Garden.

== Early life and education ==
Fowler is the daughter of Lillian (née Schuman) and Sol Goldman. She has three siblings: Allan H. Goldman, Diane Goldman Kemper, and Jane Goldman. Her father was the largest non-institutional real estate investor in New York City in the 1980s, owning nearly 1900 commercial and residential properties. Her siblings, Allan Goldman and Jane Goldman manage the remaining real estate assets via the firm Solil Management. Her cousin, Lloyd Goldman, is a real-estate investor in New York City.

Goldman earned a bachelor's degree in psychology from Barnard College (1976), a master's in developmental psychology from Columbia University's Teachers College (1978), and a doctorate in clinical psychology (PhD) from Oklahoma State University in 1984.

== Career ==
Goldman is an American businesswoman and gardener. She has been profiled by The New York Times in 2004, The Washington Post, The New York Sun in 2007 and several other publications including Organic Style and Horticulture magazine. In 2007, Goldman also appeared on Martha Stewart Living TV and PBS' The Victory Garden.

== Bibliography ==
Goldman is the author of five books. These were illustrated by the photographer Victor Schrager.

Melons for the Passionate Grower (Artisan, 2002) was nominated for several other awards including: The Garden Writers Association of America 2003 Garden Globe Award of Achievement, various Bookbinder's Awards for design and production, a James Beard Foundation Award (Reference Books category) and the International Association of Culinary Professionals award for Best Design.

The Compleat Squash: A Passionate Grower's Guide To Pumpkins, Squashes and Gourds (Artisan, 2004) was a 2005 American Horticultural Society Book Award-winner, and won a bronze award of achievement from The Garden Writers Association of America.

The Heirloom Tomato: From Garden to Table – Recipes, Portraits and History of the World's Most Beautiful Fruit was published by Bloomsbury in 2008. It was a recipient of the American Horticultural Society's 2009 Book Award.

Heirloom Harvest: Modern Daguerreotypes of Historic Garden Treasures (Bloomsbury, 2015) is illustrated by daguerreotypist Jerry Spagnoli. The book has more than 175 photographs of fruits, vegetables, nuts, herbs, and berries grown by Goldman on her 200-acre Hudson Valley farmstead. Goldman's essay, "Fruits of the Earth", describes her 25-year collaboration with the land. Heirloom Harvest has appeared in The Washington Post, Elle Décor, Harper's Bazaar, The Financial Times, The Daily Beast, The East Hampton Star, and Town and Country. In August 2016 it won the Association for Garden Communicators (GWA)'s silver medal in the Book Category. It also won two distinctions at the October 2016 New York Book Show (Book Industry Guild of New York): Best in Special Trade (Art Books) and Best in Special Trade/Photography. Heirloom Harvest was honored in 2016 by the British Book Awards as best book in the Lifestyle Illustrated category.

The Melon (City Point Press, 2019), her fifth book, was reviewed in The New York Times and The Washington Post.

Goldman's writing appears in such publications as Martha Stewart Living, The New York Times, Organic Connections, and Organic Gardening.

== Awards ==
Her first three books and her last, The Melon, won American Horticultural Society Book of the Year awards.

- 2021 Florens DeBevoise Medal awarded by The Garden Club of America for distinguished achievement in the heirloom seed and local food movement.
- 2020 Silver Medal of Achievement by GardenComm to The Melon in the Book: General Readership category of Writing.

== Affiliations ==
Fowler is a trustee of both the Lillian Goldman Charitable Trust and the Amy P. Goldman Foundation. She is also on the council of the New York Restoration Project.

Goldman previously served as executive director of the Sol Goldman Charitable Trust of New York City. She is also a former vice chairman of the New York Botanical Garden (NYBG) Board.

In September 2014, Fowler was elected chairman of the Center for Jewish History, a position she held until December 2016.

Goldman served on the board of directors of Seed Savers Exchange for more than ten years, half of that time as chair, and as of 2012 was a special advisor to the board.

As of 2024, Goldman was one of the largest donors to Democratic Party candidates, having contributed over $27,000,000 in her lifetime.

== Personal life ==
On April 28, 2012, Goldman married Cary Fowler at the terrace on top of the Arsenal in Central Park.
