= Elizabeth W. Greenwood =

American social reformer and evangelist(1849/1850–1922

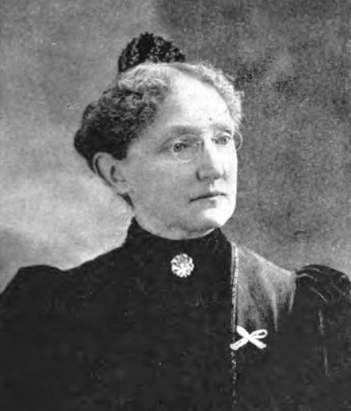
Elizabeth W. Greenwood

Elizabeth Ward Greenwood (1849/1850 – November 28, 1922) was an American social reformer in the temperance movement, and evangelist in the Methodist Episcopal Church.

Early on, she became involved in the Woman's Christian Temperance Union (WCTU). She served as President of a large Union, Superintendent of Scientific Temperance Instruction in her state; National Superintendent of Juvenile work; and World's and National Superintendent of Evangelistic work. As lecturer, preacher, evangelist, she held immense audiences in most conservative churches, also lecturing in jails, asylums, factories and halls. For 20 years, Greenwood preached during the summer to a large congregation, near her country home, ministering also in homes, and at funerals. Though she was a Methodist, for some years, she attended upon the ministry of Dr. Richard Salter Storrs, of Brooklyn.

== Early life and education ==
Elizabeth Ward Greenwood was born to affluent parents in Brooklyn, New York, in 1849, or 1850. Her parents were Joseph M. Greenwood, Brooklyn lawyer, and Cynthia (Ward) Greenwood of Sheffield, Massachusetts. Greenwood was born in the old family home in Brooklyn, and lived there the greater part of her life. She was converted at the age of fourteen and turned away from a fashionable life to her books and to philanthropic work.

She was educated at Miss Harvey's private school and later, at the age of 18, graduated from the Brooklyn Heights Seminary under Dr. Charles E. West, winning highest honors and acting as valedictorian of her class. Dr. West pronounced her one of the most brilliant pupils he had ever known.

After graduating, in 1869, she took a post-graduate course, and then spent some time at Brooklyn Heights Seminary as a teacher of the higher branches, and in giving weekly lectures in the Senior and Junior departments. Then came years of continued study and literary pursuits.

== Career ==
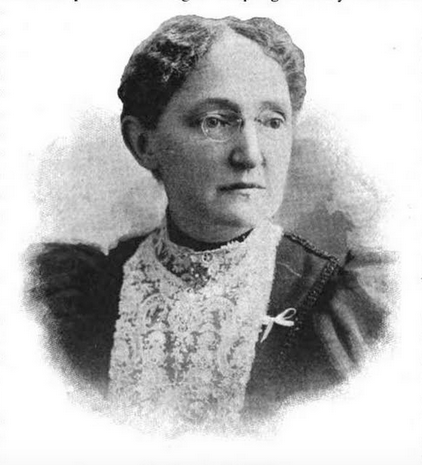
Elizabeth Greenwood

As the temperance enthusiasm spread from Ohio eastward, Greenwood became interested in the movement in her own city. When the Women's Crusade opened, she enlisted at once. She was conspicuous in the white-ribbon movement throughout New York and the nation. When scientific temperance instruction in the New York City schools was being provided for, Greenwood did important work with the legislature, as State superintendent of that department. She served as national superintendent of juvenile work.

Beginning in the WCTU, and many of the churches of Brooklyn, her work extended to nearly all the conservative churches of the large cities and towns in the Eastern seaboard. She was equally at home in jails, asylums, factories, and saloons. For years, served as president of the WCTU on the Hill in Brooklyn, as superintendent of its juvenile work, and as lecturer and evangelist. She spent her summers in the Berkshire Hills, Massachusetts, where she preached on Sundays to large audiences. In 1888, she was made superintendent of the evangelistic department of the National WCTU.

"She was but 24 years old," wrote Frances E. Willard in 1889, "when the woman's crusade began. Her remarkable quickness and versatility, her culture and her consecration admirably adapted her to the variety of methods in the Woman's Christian Temperance Union. Beginning as an evangelist in her own city and a lecturer upon literary and other themes, her work extended through its own success, throughout the Nation."

As superintendent of the New York State Department of Temperance Instructions in Schools and Colleges, a position she was instrumental in creating through her tireless efforts to bring about the law warranting it, Greenwood made a strenuous campaign in favor of the bill, which carried her all over the State of New York, and worked for it unceasingly. The measure was signed by President Grover Cleveland.

In 1889, she visited Europe, and there she continued her reform efforts. She did frequent work abroad as a lecturer and evangelist. Greenwood was also keenly interested in woman's suffrage and was one of its early champions in the United States.

For eighteen years, she was a preacher of the Gospel at Collinsville, Connecticut, and for an even longer period at Sheffield, Massachusetts, where, at the request of neighbors, she commenced a summer Sunday service in the old Ward School House near her home. These services eventually became so crowded that a regular church was opened for her nearby. It was attended by a congregation drawn from a dozen different towns. For seven years, Greenwood occupied the pulpit of the Mayflower Mission of Henry Ward Beecher's church in Brooklyn.

== Personal life ==
In 1914, she suffered a breakdown which made her a semi-Invalid and forced her virtual retirement from active work in the field. For the last eight or nine years, she was forced to curtail her active interests in the varied crusades to which she gave her life, but to the last, she read magazines of current events.

She died on November 28, 1922, at her Brooklyn home after a lingering illness. She was buried Greenwood Cemetery. Greenwood was survived by a sister, Mrs. William C. Hitter; a brother, William Greenwood; and two nieces.
