= Castle Connolly Medical =

American publishing organization

Castle Connolly Top Doctors
- Castle Connolly Top Doctors
- Abbreviation: Castle Connolly
- Named after: John K. Castle and John J Connolly
- Formation: 1991
- Founder: John K. Castle and John J Connolly
- Founded at: New York
- Legal status: Company
- Purpose: Publishing Medical Directory
- Headquarters: New York
- Location: New York City, United States
- Products: America's Top Doctors
- Fields: Healthcare Research; Information Services
- Official language: English
- Main organ: publication
- Parent organization: Everyday Health Group
- Awards: Best Social Media, Silver Distinction - 2025 eHealthcare Awards; Best Short Video Content, Distinction - 2025 eHealthcare Awards; Best Provider Directory, Gold Distinction - 2024 eHealthcare Awards; Best Site Design - 2024 eHealthcare Awards; Best Digital Leadership in Health Equity, Diversity, and Inclusion, Platinum Distinction - 2023 eHealthcare Awards; Best Provider Directory, Gold - 2022 eHealthcare Leadership Awards
- Website: www.castleconnolly.com

Castle Connolly Top Doctors is a publishing and healthcare research organization that provides information services to help patients find leading medical professionals. The organization is best known for its annual lists of Top Doctors and Top Hospitals in the United States, which highlight physicians and institutions recognized for clinical excellence and peer-reviewed achievements. Inclusion on the lists is based on merit and cannot be purchased.

Castle Connolly Top Doctors recognizes the top 7% of physicians, based on important criteria including professional qualifications, education, hospital and faculty appointments, research leadership, professional reputation and disciplinary history

Castle Connolly's Top Hospitals recognize healthcare institutions that provide exceptional patient care and outcomes, ranking among the best nationally, statewide, and in metro areas for their performance in specific medical procedures. The program aims to highlight hospitals that are setting new standards in care delivery and advancing health equity. As with Top Doctors, inclusion is entirely merit-based and cannot be purchased.

Castle Connolly has partnered with magazine publications across the country for more than 30 years to produce regionally focused Top Doctors and Top Hospitals lists. Participating publications include Boston Magazine, Chicago Magazine, San Francisco Magazine, among others.

== History ==
John K Castle and John J Connolly while being the chairman and President respectively of the board of trustees of the New York Medical College, founded Castle Connolly Medical in 1991. Castle Connolly Graduate Medical, a separate organization that publishes books and guidebooks, was established in 1999. A sister organization was established in 2006 with the name Castle Connolly Healthcare Navigation, to provide guidance in health and insurance. The sister organization was later merged with Castle Connolly Medical. Everyday Health Group acquired the organization in 2019.

== Awards and Recognitions ==
Castle Connolly has been recognized by the eHealthcare Leadership Awards for excellence in digital innovation and healthcare communications across several key categories. Honors include:

- Silver Distinction, Best Social Media (2025)
- Best Short Video Content (2025)
- Gold Distinction, Best Provider Directory (2024)
- Best Site Design (2024)
- Platinum Distinction, Best Digital Leadership in Health Equity, Diversity, and Inclusion (2023)
- Gold Distinction, Best Provider Directory (2022)

== Magazine Partnerships ==
Castle Connolly's magazine partners span a wide range of regional publications across the United States. Current partners include:

- 5280 Magazine
- Acadiana Profile
- Angeleno
- The Atlantan Magazine
- Boston Magazine
- Charlotte Magazine
- Chicago Magazine
- Columbus Monthly
- Connecticut Magazine
- Desert Companion
- Gulfshore Life
- Honolulu Magazine
- Hudson Valley Magazine
- Jacksonville Magazine
- Jersey's Best
- Kansas City Magazine
- Louisiana Life
- Local Profile
- Memphis Magazine
- MKE Lifestyle
- Modern Luxury-CS
- Modern Luxury-DC
- Modern Luxury-Hawaii
- Modern Luxury-San Diego
- Nashville Lifestyles
- Newsday
- New Hampshire Magazine
- New Orleans Magazine
- New York Magazine
- Northshore Magazine
- Oklahoma Magazine
- Palm Springs Life
- Philadelphia Magazine
- Pittsburgh Magazine
- San Francisco Magazine
- Sarasota Magazine
- Schneps Media- Brooklyn Courier Life
- Schneps Media- Queens Courier
- Seattle Magazine
- St. Louis Magazine
- Tampa Bay Metro
- The Boca Raton Observer
- Tucson Lifestyle
- Westchester Magazine
