= Paul Michael Iogolevitch =

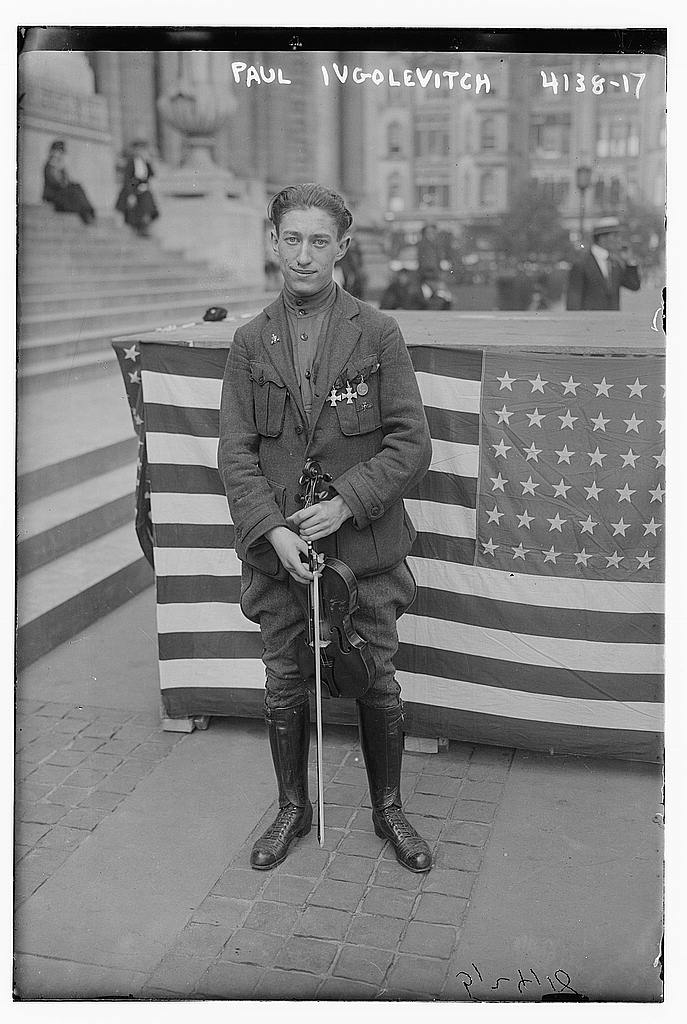
- Iogolevitch in 1918

Background information
- Also known as: Capton Michael Paul
- Born: December 12, 1901; Outer Mongolia
- Died: December 8, 1980 (aged 78) West Palm Beach, Florida, US
- Instrument: Violin

Paul Michael Iogolevitch (December 12, 1901 – December 8, 1980), later known as Capton Michael Paul was a violinist who joined the Russian Army at age 15 and fought in World War I. He migrated to the United States where he became wealthy in the petroleum industry. He founded the C. Michael Paul Foundation.

== Early life ==
He was born on December 12, 1901, in Outer Mongolia to Michael A. Iogolevitch, a physician who later became the surgeon general of Czar Nicholas II of Russia.

== Military career ==
Iogolevitch served in World War I fighting for Russia where he won two Cross of St. George medals.

== Personal life ==
In 1942 he married former Broadway Actress Martha Mackay.

In 1959 he married Josephine Perfect Bay in Palm Beach, Florida.

U.S. President John F. Kennedy would stay at his estate, in 1961 and 1962.

== Philanthropy ==
In 1965 he donated $1M toward the C. Michael Paul Hall at the Juilliard School.

== Death ==
He died on December 8, 1980, at Good Samaritan Hospital in West Palm Beach, Florida.

== Legacy ==
- C. Michael Paul Hall at the Juilliard School.
