= Castle Harlan =

US-based private equity firm

- Type: Private
- Industry: Private equity
- Founded: 1987; 39 years ago
- Founders: John K. Castle and Leonard M. Harlan
- Headquarters: New York City, U.S.
- Products: Leveraged buyout, Growth capital
- Number of employees: 25+
- Website: www.castleharlan.com

Castle Harlan is a private equity firm based in New York City. The company focuses on buyouts and growth capital investments in middle-market companies across a range of industries. Founded in 1987, Castle Harlan invests in controlling interests in middle-market companies in North America and Europe, Australia and Southeast Asia through Castle Harlan Australian Mezzanine Partners.

Castle Harlan's team of 18 investment managers has completed over 50 acquisitions since its inception with a total value of approximately $10 billion. The firm currently manages investment funds with equity commitments of approximately $3.5 billion.

Castle Harlan has invested, through its five domestic funds, in more than 55 platform businesses that totaled over $11 billion of enterprise value.

== History ==
Castle Harlan was founded in 1987 by John K. Castle and Leonard M. Harlan, but its history goes back to the 1960s. During the 60s John Castle headed all of the private equity activities, including the Sprout Capital Group, at Donaldson Lufkin & Jenrette (DLJ). At that time DLJ used some of the first limited partnerships to bring institutional investors into private equity investing. From the period between 1979 and 1986, Castle rose to become the president and chief executive officer at DLJ.

Leonard Harlan joined DLJ in 1965. Harlan left DLJ in 1969, and formed a real estate investment group, The Harlan Company. In 1987, Castle and Harlan, with a few others raised $125 million for its new limited partnership, Legend Capital Group, L.P., to invest in leveraged buyout transactions.

In 1999, Castle Harlan teamed with Bill Ferris and Joseph Skrzynski of Australian Mezzanine Investments to create Castle Harlan Australian Mezzanine Partners, also known as CHAMP. CHAMP focuses on control investments in middle-market businesses in Australia and Southeast Asia with similar criteria to Castle Harlan. CHAMP also has an affiliate, CHAMP Ventures, that invests in small buyouts, non-control growth capital and venture capital. CHAMP raised its second fund with A$950 million of investor commitments in 2005 and its third fund with A$1.5 billion in 2010.

On April 17, 2018, Castle Harlan announced its agreement to purchase the oil and gas production equipment assets of Exterran Corporation. The deal resulted in the creation of a new company, Titan Production Equipment. The sale was closed in summer 2018, and Titan Production Equipment launched in July 2018.

In August 2019, Castle Harlan, together with Branford Castle Partners, purchased Sunless Inc., a spray tanning equipment manufacturer, from The Riverside Company.

In October 2019, the company sold one of its portfolio companies, Gold Star Foods, to Highview Capital. Castle Harlan purchased Gold Star in April 2014.

By November 2019, the firm had the following five investments: Sunless, Shelf Drilling, Caribbean Restaurants LLC, Titan Production Equipment and Tensar Corp.

== Investments vehicles ==
=== Private equity funds ===
Since its launch, Castle Harlan has participated in the following eight private equity funds. Five located in the United States, and three in Australia: The following are the U.S. based funds:

Fund	Vintage Year	Committed Capital
Castle Harlan Partners V	2010	Approx. $1.0 billion
Castle Harlan Partners IV	2003	$1.2 billion
Castle Harlan Partners III	1997	$630 million
Castle Harlan Partners II	1992	$275 million
Legend Capital Group	1987	$125 million

=== Portfolio companies ===
Castle Harlan co-owns Bravo Brio Restaurant Group, Tensar, Polypipe Group, Horizon Lines, Ames True Temper, Austar United Communications, McCormick & Schmick's, RathGibson, United Malt Holdings, and AmeriCast Technologies.

Company	Acquisition Year	Purchase Price	Year sold	Price sold
Tensar Corporation	2014			
Bravo Brio Restaurant Group	2006			
Polypipe	2005	$527 million		
Horizon Lines	2004	$650 million		
Ames True Temper	2004	$380 million		
Austar United Communications	2003	$34.5 million		
McCormick & Schmick's	1994 and 2001		1997 and 2004	
RathGibson	2006	$260 million	2007	$440 million
United Malt Holdings	2006		2009	
AmeriCast Technologies	2006		2008	$288 million

== Branford Castle, Inc ==
New York based private equity firm Branford Castle was founded in 1986 as a private market investor in companies with less than $100 million annual sales. It is run by brothers John S. Castle and David A. Castle. In November 2019 Branford Castle sold Surface Preparation Technologies to Dominus Capital and Drew Foam Companies, one of Branford's portfolio companies, purchased Davis Core & Pad from owner Joel Davis. In September 2019 it bought Pulse Veterinary Technologies and in August, 2019 it acquired ABC Industries.

== Awards and recognition ==
In 2019, the Association for Corporate Growth awarded Titan Production Equipment, an affiliate of Castle Harlan, the Houston Deal of the Year Award in the category of Restructuring and Turnaround Transactions.

== Additional references ==
- CASTLE HARLAN'S RICHES FROM NICHES. Business Week, November 11, 1996
- Castle Harlan executive says fair-value rule has contributed to economic crisis. Private Equity Wire, December 16, 2008
- Polypipe: Castle Harlan Disconnects Polypipe. The Deal, Aug 14, 2007
