= Alan H. Goldman =

American philosopher (born 1945)

- Born: 1945 (age 80–81); New York
- Spouse: Joan Goldman
- Awards: NEH Fellowship; ACLS Fellowship

Education
- Education: Columbia University (Ph.D.); Yale University (B.A.)
- Doctoral advisor: Arthur Danto, Issac Levi

Philosophical work
- Era: 21st-century philosophy
- Region: Western philosophy
- School: Analytic
- Institutions: College of William & Mary
- Main interests: moral philosophy, aesthetics, epistemology, value theory

Alan Harris Goldman (born 1945) is an American philosopher and William R. Kenan Jr. Professor Emeritus of Philosophy at the College of William & Mary. He is known for his works on philosophy and popular culture, literature, morality, love, and beauty.

== Philosophy ==
He has defended an explanationist theory of knowledge, a coherentist theory of moral truth, an ideal critic account of acceptable aesthetic judgment, and a subjectivist view of well-being and value. In an earlier book he argued for preference in admissions and hiring on socio-economic, not gender or racial, grounds. In the first book on ethics across the professions, he introduced the concept of role differentiation, while attacking zealous advocacy by lawyers, medical paternalism, and profit maximization by corporations.

== Books ==
- Life's Values: Pleasure, Happiness, Well-Being, Meaning, Oxford University Press, 2018
- Philosophy and the Novel, Oxford University Press, 2013
- Reasons from Within, Oxford University Press, 2009
- Practical Rules: When We Need Them and When We Don't, Cambridge University Press, 2002
- Aesthetic Value, Westview Press, 1995
- Moral Knowledge, Routledge & Kegan Paul, 1988
- Empirical Knowledge, University of California Press, 1988
- The Moral Foundations of Professional Ethics, Rowman and Littlefield, 1980
- Justice and Reverse Discrimination, Princeton University Press, 1979
- Mark Twain and Philosophy (ed.), Rowman and Littlefield, 2017
