= Alan S. Goldman =

American chemist

Alan S. Goldman is an American chemist and Distinguished Professor of Chemistry at Rutgers University-New Brunswick. Goldman's research area is homogeneous catalysis with emphasis on C-H activation and functionalization of hydrocarbons, and the reduction of dinitrogen.

Iridium pincer complex for alkane dehydrogenation.

== Recognition ==
Goldman has been recognized by numerous awards. He was awarded the ACS Catalysis Lectureship for the Advancement of Catalytic Science in 2018. He received the ACS Award in Organometallic Chemistry in 2019 and the Sir Geoffrey Wilkinson Award from the Royal Society of Chemistry (UK) in 2020. In 2021, he was elected as a Fellow of the American Association for the Advancement of Science.
