= Allan H. Goldman =

American real estate investor (1943–2022)

- Born: 1943
- Died: January 15, 2022
- Parent(s): Sol Goldman (1917–1987); Lillian Schuman Goldman (1922–2002)
- Family: Jane Goldman (sister); Diane Goldman Kemper (sister); Amy Goldman Fowler (sister); Lloyd Goldman (cousin)

Allan H. Goldman (1943-2022) was an American real estate investor and co-Chairman of the real estate investment company Solil Management. He died on January 15, 2022.

== Biography ==
Goldman was born in 1943 to a Jewish family, the son of Lillian (née Schuman) and Sol Goldman. He has three sisters: Jane Goldman, Diane Goldman Kemper, and Amy Goldman Fowler. His father was the largest non-institutional real estate investor in New York City in the 1980s, owning a portfolio of nearly 1,900 commercial and residential properties. After his father's death, his three sisters engaged in litigation with their mother over his father's assets; their mother subsequently received 1/3rd of their father's estate. He and his sister, Jane Goldman, manage the remaining real estate assets via the firm Solil Management. His cousin, Lloyd Goldman, is also a notable real-estate investor in New York City.
