= Allen Goldman =

American physicist (1937–2025)

Allen Marshall Goldman (October 18, 1937 – May 16, 2025) was an American experimental condensed matter physicist, known for his research on electronic transport properties of superconductors and for the eponymous Carlson-Goldman mode involving collective oscillations in superconductors.

== Life and career ==
Goldman was born on October 18, 1937. He graduated in 1954 from the Bronx High School of Science and received in 1958 his bachelor's degree in physics and chemistry from Harvard University. In 1965, he graduated from Stanford University with a Ph.D. in physics. His Ph.D. thesis Properties of superconductors and selected magnetic materials in the configuration of thin films was supervised by William M. Fairbank.

Goldman became in 1965 an assistant professor in the physics department of the University of Minnesota. From 1966 to 1970, he was a Sloan Research Fellow. In the 1970s, he discovered, with his doctoral student Richard V. Carlson, collective oscillations (Carlson-Goldman modes) in thin superconducting films. Such modes are coupled collective oscillations of a thin superconducting film's superconducting part (i.e. Cooper pairs) and the film's quasiparticles. Goldman was one of the pioneers in the study of phase transitions in two-dimensional systems, including the Kosterlitz-Thouless transition in thin superconducting films and networks of Josephson transitions. There he was a full professor from 1975 to 1992 and an Institute of Technology Distinguished Professor from 1992 to 2008 with appointment to regent's professor in 2008. Goldman was elected in 1982 a fellow of the American Association for the Advancement of Science, in 1984 a fellow of the American Physical Society, and in 2007 a member of the National Academy of Sciences. He was also the head of the University of Minnesota's school of physics and astronomy from 1996 to 2009. He became regents professor emeritus.

Goldman was known for his experiments involving "superconductivity, in the configuration of thin films, with an emphasis on the effects of disorder and dimensional constraints." He did important research on properties of electron transport in them, and, especially, superconducting thin films (two-dimensional systems). In the mid-1980s, he and his group developed a new method for producing extremely thin superconducting films and used it to study the phase transition from superconductor to insulator in thin films, which became a prime example of a quantum phase transition. In addition to his research on superconductor-insulator transitions, he and his colleagues have studied "magnetic superconductors, heavy fermion materials, the investigation of the properties of high-T_{c} superconductors and the electrostatic control of the ground states of novel materials." He made important contributions, using molecular-beam epitaxy, to the development of methods of producing high-T_{c} superconductors.

From 1999 to 2005, he was an associate editor for the Reviews of Modern Physics. The University of Minnesota annually awards the Goldman Fellowship to a graduate student in the physics department.

In 2002, he received the Fritz London Memorial Prize.

From 2006 to 2008, he was vice-chair and then chair of the Division of Condensed Matter Physics of the American Physical Society.

In 2015, he received, jointly with Aharon Kapitulnik, Arthur F. Hebard, and Matthew P. A. Fisher, the Oliver E. Buckley Condensed Matter Prize for "discovery and pioneering investigations of the superconductor-insulator transition, a paradigm for quantum phase transitions."

Goldman died on May 16, 2025, at the age of 87.

== Selected publications ==
=== Books ===
- Goldman, Allen M.; Wolf, Stuart A., eds. (22 November 2013). Percolation, Localization, and Superconductivity (Proceedings of the NATO Advanced Study Institute on Percolation, Localization, and Superconductivity, held June 19–July, 1983, at Les Arc, Savoie, France). Springer. ISBN 9781461593942. (pbk reprint of 1983 1st edition)
