= Andrew Michael (businessman) =

British entrepreneur

- Born: 10 January 1980 (age 46); Cyprus
- Occupation: entrepreneur
- Known for: founder of Bark.com

Andrew Michael (born 10 January 1980) is a British-Cypriot tech entrepreneur and founder of Fasthosts, Livedrive and Bark.com.

== Early life and Fasthosts ==
Andrew Michael was born in Cyprus, and grew up in Charlton Kings, near Cheltenham, United Kingdom. Aged 17, and as part of an A-level project, Michael started web hosting company, Fasthosts. In 2002, Fasthosts was listed in the Sunday Times as one of the fastest growing technology companies in the UK, and by 2005 reported a turnover of £20m and a profit of £5m. In 2006 the company was sold to German internet company United Internet for a reported £61m, with Michael owning a 75% share in the company.

== Livedrive ==
In 2008, Michael founded the UK-based cloud storage and cloud backup company Livedrive, which offered customers unlimited online storage. Nicholas Cowell was also an investor in the company. In late 2009, he launched the company in the US.

In 2014 Michael sold Livedrive to J2 Global.

== Bark.com ==
In 2014 Andrew co-founded Bark.com with Kai Feller. The company enables customers to easily contact local service professionals, avoiding the need to make multiple calls. In March 2015, Nick Hewer signed on as brand ambassador.
