= Bark.com =

British services marketplace

- Type: Private
- Industry: Lead generation Small business marketing Local services
- Founded: 2014
- Founders: Andrew Michael; Kai Feller
- Headquarters: London, United Kingdom
- Area served: Australia; Canada; Ireland; New Zealand; Singapore; South Africa; United Kingdom; United States; India
- Services: Market for small business services
- Number of employees: 227
- Website: bark.com

Bark.com is a web-based services marketplace headquartered in London that was founded in November 2014 by British entrepreneurs Andrew Michael and Kai Feller.

== Description ==
Bark.com matches service buyers to suitable service providers. It allows people to book local service professionals.

== History ==
Bark was founded in 2014 and launched in January 2015. In 2014, while seeking various local services, Feller experienced difficulty finding reliable providers online. In 2015, without any funding, he and serial entrepreneur Andrew Michael built and launched Bark.com.

In January 2015, it was announced that Bark had purchased Dublin-based skills marketplace SkillPages for an undisclosed sum.

In March 2015, English television presenter Nick Hewer became Bark's brand ambassador.

As of 2019, the service has 5m users across 5 markets and turned over £20m

In March 2020, the company launched in Singapore, New Zealand and Australia.

In April 2022, Bark was acquired by the private equity firm EMK Capital in a deal reported to be valued at £240 million.

In 2023, Bark featured number #6 on The Sunday Times 100 fastest-growing companies list.

== Key people ==
=== Kai Feller ===
Kai Feller
- Born: 1991 (age 34–35); Exeter, England
- Education: Cardiff University (BEng)
- Occupation: Businessperson
- Years active: 2012–present
- Employer: Bark.com (2015–2023)
- Organization: Bark.com

Kai Feller (born 1991) is a British businessperson who is the co-founder of Bark.com and served as its chief executive officer (CEO) until 2023. Feller was born in 1991 in Exeter, England. He graduated from Cardiff University with a First-class Honours degree in Engineering. In 2012, during his final year at university, he co-founded Socialite, a booking mobile app for users to find sporting and entertainment events.

During his tenure, Bark grew from zero to £70 million revenue and £15 million profit, expanding its services to several countries, including the United States, Canada, South Africa, and Ireland. Following the 2022 acquisition, Feller continued to serve as CEO until 2023 after which he transitioned to an advisor to Bark.com.

=== Andrew Michael ===
Andrew Michael (born 10 January 1980) is a British-Cypriot tech entrepreneur and founder of Fasthosts, Livedrive and Bark.com.
