= IPVanish =

Virtual private network provider

IPVanish VPN
- Original authors: Highwinds Network Group; Mudhook Media, Inc.; StackPath; J2 Global
- Release: 2012
- Operating system: Android; Fire TV; iOS; Linux; macOS; Windows
- Available in: English
- Type: Virtual private network, Internet censorship circumvention
- License: Proprietary
- Website: ipvanish.com
- Industry: Cybersecurity
- Founded: 2012
- Headquarters: New York City
- Area served: Worldwide
- Parent: Ziff Davis
- Website: www.ipvanish.com

IPVanish VPN (also known as IPVanish) is a VPN service based in the United States owned by the company Ziff Davis.

== History ==
IPVanish was founded in 2012 by Mudhook Media Inc, an independent subsidiary of Highwinds Network Group in Orlando, Florida.

In 2017, Highwinds Network Group was acquired by CDN company StackPath which included IPVanish as part of the acquisition.

In 2019, IPVanish was acquired by J2 Global (later renamed Ziff Davis) establishing NetProtect, the consumer cybersecurity unit of their VIPRE Security Group.

In 2021, during the Nigerian Twitter ban, IPVanish reportedly emerged as the most popular VPN service in the country for those accessing the site.

== Product ==
IPVanish VPN includes anti-malware and tracking tools across its apps for Windows, Mac, Android, iOS, and Fire TV with split tunneling.

=== Free Security Tools ===
In June 2024, the company released four complimentary security tools on its website: an IP checker, a password generator, an internet speed checker powered by Speedtest by Ookla, and a Link Checker. The Link Checker uses Al and machine-learning technology derived from VIPRE to identify threats in real time on existing pages. The Link Checker engine also powers a QR code checking tool to help prevent quishing threats.

== Technical details ==
=== Encryption ===
IPVanish uses the WireGuard and OpenVPN technologies in its applications, while the IKEv2/IPsec and L2TP connection protocols can also be configured. PPTP was discontinued in 2022. IPVanish supports the AES (128-bit or 256-bit) specifications, with SHA-256 for authentication and an RSA-2048 handshake.

=== Servers ===
IPVanish owns and operates more than 3100 remote HDD and RAM-only servers in over 145+ locations.

The company suspended operations in Russia as of July 2016, due to conflicts with the company's zero-log policy and local law. In July 2020, IPVanish removed its servers from Hong Kong, alleging that the Hong Kong national security law puts Hong Kong under the “same tight internet restrictions that govern mainland China.” As of 2022, IPVanish had removed its physical servers from India in response to data retention regulations that require VPN providers to log certain personal information of their users. In December 2023, Turkey blocked 16 VPN providers, including IPVanish, as part of a broader crackdown on circumvention tools.

=== No log policy ===
IPVanish does not log traffic destination or content, IP addresses, connection time stamps, or DNS inquiries according to multiple independent audits. Information about what is done online, what is downloaded, or what is searched for is not logged.

In 2018, TorrentFreak reported that in 2016, IPVanish handed over personal information about a customer who was suspected of sharing child pornography on an IRC network to the Department of Homeland Security (DHS). The information allowed DHS to identify the customer but the disclosure contradicted IPVanish's privacy policy, which stated that "[IPVanish] will never log any traffic or usage of our VPN." In 2017, IPVanish and its parent company were acquired by StackPath. At the time, its founder and CEO, Lance Crosby, claimed that "at the time of the acquisition, [...] no logs existed, no logging systems existed and no previous/current/future intent to save logs existed."

In 2022, under new ownership under Ziff Davis, IPVanish underwent an independently verified no-logs audit conducted by Leviathan Security Group, confirming it abides by its no logs policy. In 2025, the company completed a n additional independent audit conducted by Schellman Compliance, again reaffirming that that IPVanish follows its no-logs policy and does not retain data related to customer traffic.

== Reception ==
In a 2018 review highlighting IPVanish ‘zero logs’ policies and nonprofit support, CNET ranked IPVanish as one of the best VPN services of the year.

TechRadar rated the service 4 out of 5 stars in their March 2018 review, commending it for its "powerful features" while criticizing its “lethargic support response”. Tom's Guide wrote that it "packs an impressive amount of features and robust security, as well as unlimited simultaneous connections".

IPVanish faces criticism with a large number of negative reviews regarding dishonoured cancellation terms, accounting for up to 6% of all negative reviews.

== See also ==
- Comparison of virtual private network services
- Internet privacy
- Encryption
- Secure communication
