= Lotto24 =

German company

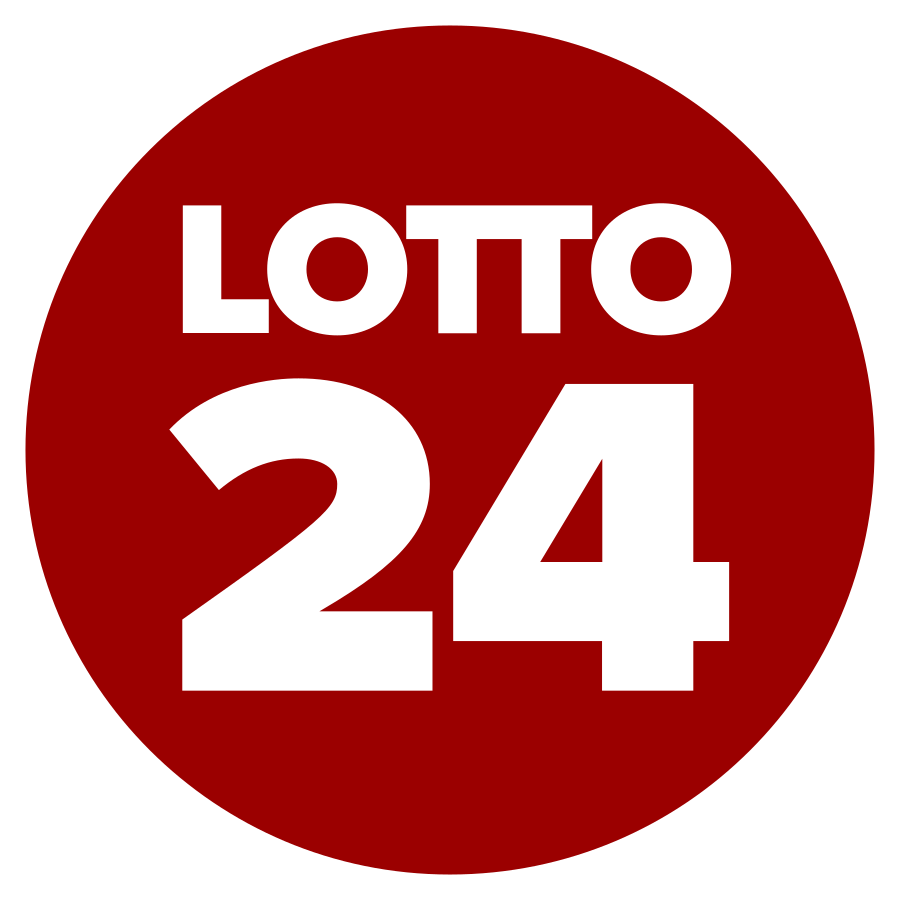
- Type: Joint-stock company
- Founded: 2010
- Headquarters: Hamburg, Germany
- Key people: Andrea Behrendt; Dorian Freudenreich
- Revenue: € 155 million (2023)
- Number of employees: 146 (2023)
- Website: https://www.lotto24.de

LOTTO24 is a reseller of state and charity lotteries on the Internet. The German company brokers tickets for various state lotteries under the LOTTO24 and Tipp24 brands. In addition the company has launched charity lotteries of their own to promote educational and social projects. In addition, online games are offered. LOTTO24 is a company of the ZEAL Group. LOTTO24 shares were traded on the Frankfurt Stock Exchange from July 2012 to August 2021.

== History ==
LOTTO24 was founded in Hamburg in 2010. The company was formed by spinning off the German business of the then international secondary lottery provider, now ZEAL Network SE. On July 3, 2012, the company went public and was listed in the Prime Standard segment of the Frankfurt Stock Exchange. In September 2012, LOTTO24 was one of the first private providers to receive state permission to sell lotteries on the Internet, which was followed by advertising permission for TV and the Internet in March 2013. In 2014, LOTTO24 became the first online lottery provider in Germany to publish mobile apps for iOS and Android, allowing lottery players to submit their picks via smartphone and tablet. In May 2019, LOTTO24 was acquired by ZEAL Network SE and has since been part of the ZEAL Group. LOTTO24 applied for the revocation of its listing with effect from 13 September 2021. In 2024, the remaining shares of the minority shareholders of Lotto24 AG were transferred to the parent company ZEAL Network SE as part of a squeeze-out procedure.

== Products ==
As a licensed online provider of state lotteries, Lotto24 brokers tickets for state lotteries, including Eurojackpot, Lotto 6 aus 49, Spiel77, and Glücksspirale. Lottery brokerage is the company's core business.

The company also offers three charity lotteries: freiheit+, Traumhausverlosung and Traumautoverlosung. Every freiheit+ ticket sold provides targeted support for educational projects. Participation in the Traumhausverlosung (“Dream House Raffle”) and Traumautoverlosung (“Dream Car Raffle”) supports selected and regularly changing nonprofit organizations, such as DKMS and Johanniter.

LOTTO24 offers participation in various lottery clubs. This allows players to buy tickets together with other people and increase their chances of winning. Since 2023, players can also create their own game communities and determine the teammates themselves.

The company holds a license for online games and also offers virtual slot games in the Lotto24 and Tipp24 web shops.

== Partnerships ==
Since December 2012, LOTTO24 has been cooperating with the internet provider 1&1 and selling lottery products via its internet portals WEB.DE and GMX. Since August 2022, LOTTO24 has been cooperating with the news provider n-tv.

== Player Protection and identification ==
LOTTO24 works with the Danish technology company Mindway AI on player protection. Mindway AI is an AI company outsourced to Aarhus University that uses artificial intelligence to develop player protection products. For the comprehensive protection of minors and the technology-based online identification of customers, LOTTO24 uses Nect Ident, a fully automated identification system based on artificial intelligence. Within a few minutes, customers can identify themselves using an identity document and a selfie video via app alone. The software detects digital manipulation attempts.

== Other ==
As part of its marketing activities, LOTTO24 worked with brand ambassadors. The German actor Sky du Mont was in 2022 a brand ambassador for the LOTTO24 brand and the German TV host.

In May 2022, a LOTTO24 lottery club from North Rhine-Westphalia won the €110 million Eurojackpot. This was the biggest lottery win in the history of the Federal Republic of Germany.

During the 2025–26 season of the German 2nd Bundesliga, Lotto24 was a sponsor of the FC Schalke 04 soccer club.
