= Strato AG =

German hosting provider

Strato GmbH
- Company type: Gesellschaft mit beschränkter Haftung
- Industry: Web hosting
- Founded: 1997; 29 years ago
- Headquarters: Berlin, Germany
- Number of employees: 440
- Parent: United Internet
- Website: www.strato.de

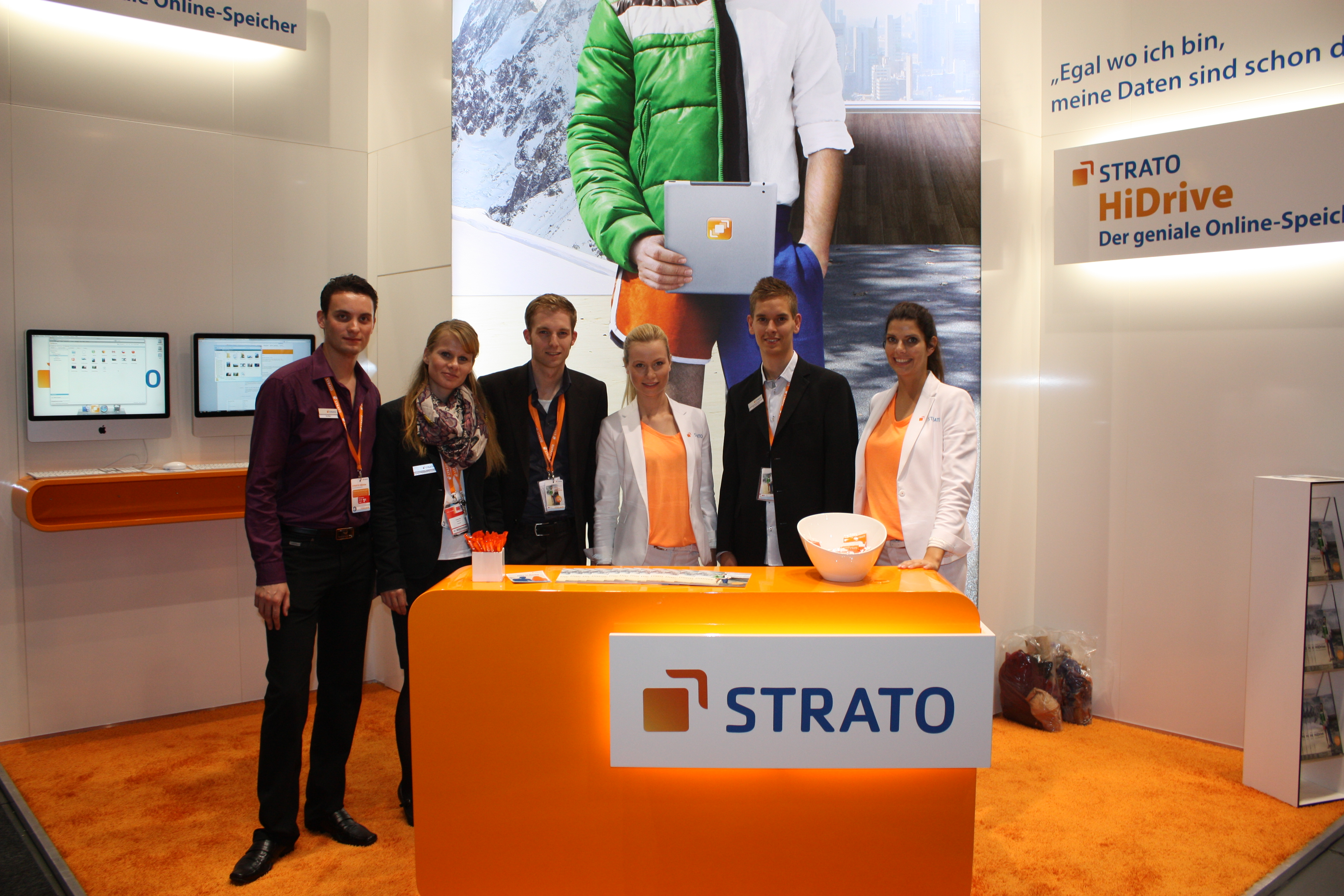
Exhibition stand at the IFA Berlin 2012

Strato GmbH is an internet hosting service provider headquartered in Berlin, Germany. It is a subsidiary of United Internet AG. Strato operates mainly in Germany and the Netherlands and serves more than 2 million customer contracts.

== History ==
Strato was founded by Marc-Alexander Ulrich, former member of the board of Escom, and Norbert Stangl, former managing director of 1&1 Internet. Since 1997, Strato offers a broad variety of webhosting plans for private and business customers in Germany. Beginning in 2006, Strato expanded operations to Italy, France, Netherlands and Poland as well as the United Kingdom. In 2010, Strato launched a cloud storage platform called HiDrive, which became free of charge for entry packages in September 2011. With its e-commerce offering, Strato relies on Shopping cart from ePages. The DSL segment, offered by Strato between 2007 and 2009, was sold to United Internet AG in 2009. Deutsche Telekom acquired Strato in November 2009 in order to expand the hosting business of T-Online. Deutsche Telekom sold Strato to United Internet for around 600 million Euro in December 2016.
