= Vipre =

Vipre is a brand name for at least two software products.

- VIPRE, an antivirus software product
- Vipre, a voice stress analysis product
