= Fireblade =

Fireblade may refer to:

- Honda Fireblade, a family of sport motorcycles
- Fireblade (company), a website security and traffic management software company
- Fire Blade (video game), a flight simulation video game
