= Highwind =

Highwind most commonly refers to:

- High winds, on the Beaufort scale

Highwind, Highwinds, or High Winds may also refer to:

== Fictional characters ==
- Ricard Highwind, fictional character in Final Fantasy II
- Kain Highwind, fictional character in Final Fantasy IV, see Characters of the Final Fantasy IV series § Kain Highwind
- Cid Highwind, fictional character in Final Fantasy VII, see Characters of the Final Fantasy VII series § Cid Highwind
- Aranea Highwind, fictional character in Final Fantasy XV, see Characters of Final Fantasy XV § Aranea Highwind

== Other uses ==
- Highwinds Network Group, also called "Highwinds", a content delivery company
- "High Winds" (TUGS episode), 1989 episode 11 of UK children's TV show TUGS

== See also ==
- High wind warning, in weather preparedness
- High wind watch, in weather preparedness
- High (disambiguation)
- Wind (disambiguation)
