= Counterspy =

Counterspy or CounterSpy may refer to:

- CounterSpy (magazine), an American espionage magazine
- Counterspy (radio series), an American espionage drama radio series
- CounterSpy (security software), an antispyware application of Sunbelt Software
- CounterSpy (video game), a 2014 video game
- Counterspy (film), a 1953 British film by Vernon Sewell
- Counter Spy (film), an action comedy film in development by The H Collective and iQiyi

== See also ==
- Counter-espionage
