= Fasthosts =

Provider of Internet access and hosting services

- Type: Private limited company
- Industry: Web hosting, domain registration, cloud services
- Founded: 1999
- Founder: Andrew Michael
- Headquarters: Gloucester, England
- Revenue: £42 million turnover (reported May 2025)
- Number of employees: 250 (reported May 2025)
- Parent: Ionos
- Website: https://www.fasthosts.co.uk

Fasthosts Internet Ltd is a provider of hosting services based in Gloucester, England. The company also formerly operated under the domain name registration service UKreg. However, UKreg ceased to operate as a standalone brand in March 2024.

Fasthosts was originally started by Andrew Michael, then aged 17, as part of an A-level school project. It became a limited company in 1999, and launched UKreg in 2000. The company specialised in providing services for small businesses, and in 2002 was listed as the second fastest growing technology company in the United Kingdom by The Sunday Times. In 2005 the company had a turnover of £20 million and made £5 million profit. The company also became known for hosting lavish staff Christmas parties; an event in 2005 costing £600,000 featured appearances from Jonathan Ross, The Darkness and Boney M.

In 2006 Fasthosts was sold to German Internet service provider United Internet for £61.5 million, netting Michael £46 million for his 75% stake. Michael remained as CEO until 2009, when he left to found Livedrive.

In September 2007, shortly after Alisher Usmanov's investment in Arsenal Football Club, Craig Murray blogged about the character of Usmanov, a Russian multi-billionaire Forbes magazine had identified as the 142nd wealthiest person in the world. He said he named Usmanov, alleging corruption, in two of his "quite highly classified" telegrams to the Foreign Office London in 2002 and 2004 written while Murray was ambassador in Uzbekistan. Usmanov's solicitors, Schillings, requested that Fasthosts delete the material. As a result, the server that hosted Murray's blog was permanently closed by the hosting company on 20 September 2007, an action which resulted in unintended deletion of other sites, including a blog by Boris Johnson.

A hacking incident in 2007 prompted Fasthosts to temporarily shut down customers' websites. The company noticed that its servers had been accessed in October and wrote to customers recommending that they change their passwords; in December after noticing "unusual activity" on some sites it closed down those that had yet to change their passwords until new passwords could be issued by post.

In 2008 Fasthosts acquired reseller Streamline.net, and also launched a reseller hosting service in the United States. Cloud infrastructure service Rise was launched in 2010. Fasthosts was the sponsor of The Great Exhibition 2012. In October 2014 Rise was quietly divested to Outsourcery for an undisclosed sum In 2017, Fasthosts had approximately 415,000 customer contracts .

Alongside their parent company IONOS, in October 2022, Fasthosts opened their 30,729 sq ft data centre in Worcester Business Park, a project reported to have cost £21 million. The Worcester site deployed various green technologies such as solar photovoltaic panels, which supply up to 10% of the facility’s energy. Following the 2022 ban on red diesel in the UK, IONOS and Fasthosts opted for the use of vegetable oil as HVO fuel (an advanced renewable diesel alternative) in the new facility.

In 2023, Fasthosts launched its "ProActive" brand, which provides managed services through its parent company's IONOS Cloud platform from its data centre in Worcester. The service offers cloud solutions for industries including e-commerce, software as a service (SaaS), healthcare, and education.

In October 2024, Fasthosts CEO Simon Yeoman exited the company. Yeoman joined Fasthosts in 2008 and held several roles, including operations director and MD, before becoming CEO in 2018. He remained in an advisory capacity until February 2025, when his term as director ended. Following his departure, Fasthosts appointed Rupert Bedell as their new Managing Director. Before joining Fasthosts as Managing Director, Bedell had more than 25 years of experience in marketing and leadership roles at companies including American Express, NatWest, and HSBC.

Fasthosts's head office is now located in the newly developed £107m Gloucester city centre Forum Building, where they moved their 250 employees in January 2025. As of May 2025, Fasthosts managed approximately 1.2 million domain names and hosted more than 10,000 servers across the UK.
