= ZEAL Network =

German company in lottery business

ZEAL Network SE
- Type: Public
- Industry: Online lotteries
- Founded: 1999; 27 years ago
- Headquarters: Hamburg, Germany
- Key people: Stefan Tweraser (CEO) Andrea Behrendt (CFO) Paul Dingwitz (CTO)
- Revenue: 218.5 million Euro (2025)
- Number of employees: 265 (2025)
- Website: zealnetwork.de

The ZEAL Network SE (formerly Tipp24 SE), headquartered in Hamburg, is an e-commerce group of companies that offers lottery products online. The brands of the ZEAL Group include Lotto24, Tipp24, Traumhausverlosung, 7days Performance, Redline Competitions, and UK Carp Competitions.

== History ==
=== 1999 to 2009 ===
Tipp24 was founded in 1999 by Jens Schumann and Marc Peters and was funded with venture capital. Since the beginning of 2000, the company has brokered participation in almost all state lotteries via the Internet. At the end of 2001, the break-even point and in 2003 billings of more than 100 million euros were reached for the first time. From 2004 onwards, cooperations were started with portals and partners such as gmx.de, MSN, Yahoo and web.de. The joint-stock company went public on October 12, 2005. Due to the German Inter-State Gambling Treaty (Glücksspielstaatsvertrag) which came into force on January 1, 2008, Tipp24 had to temporarily cease brokerage activities in Germany as of January 1, 2009 until the legal situation had been clarified. Tipp24 then expanded its business in other European countries.

=== 2009 to 2014 ===
From January 2009 (until October 2019) gaming orders were placed with MyLotto24 Ltd. via the website tipp24.com, which was operated by Tipp24 Services Ltd., based in the United Kingdom. MyLotto24 Ltd. operated an independent private lottery in the UK, and for this purpose, took over the official winning numbers and odds of the official Deutscher Lotto- und Totoblock and thus organized a so-called secondary lottery, legally a bet on the outcome of German Lotto. At the end of 2009, the joint-stock company was converted into a Societas Europaea (SE).

Following the First State Treaty amending the German Inter-State Gambling Treaty (Erster Glücksspieländerungsstaatsvertrag) and a separate Gambling Act in Schleswig-Holstein (Glücksspielgesetz in Schleswig-Holstein), the online brokerage activities with the subsidiary Lotto24 AG (previously Tipp24 Deutschland GmbH) was resumed in January 2012. In July 2012, Lotto24 AG was floated on the stock exchange and separated from Tipp24 SE as part of a spin-off.

On June 28, 2013, the company announced that it would relocate its headquarters from Hamburg to London. Lotto24 focused on Germany, while Tipp24 wanted to focus on the markets in the UK, Spain and the US. The listing on the Frankfurt Stock Exchange was retained. The transfer of the registered office was completed with the entry in the English commercial register on February 7, 2014.

=== Since 2014 ===
Tipp24 changed its name at the end of 2014 and has been operating under the name ZEAL Network ever since. In June 2017, ZEAL Network SE was removed from the SDAX index (to which the shares have belonged since 2009) due to insufficient market capitalization. They returned to the SDAX in May 2020 and remained there until December 2023. Due to regulatory risks in Germany for secondary lotteries, ZEAL announced the takeover of Lotto24 AG in November 2018. It was completed in May 2019. In September 2019, the decision was made to relocate the company's headquarters from London back to Hamburg. A key factor was the change of the business model: the secondary lottery business was converted into a state-licensed online lottery brokerage business on the basis of the brokerage license held by Lotto24, and the company became a partner of Deutscher Lotto- and Totoblock again.

In 2020, ZEAL launched its first own charity lottery, freiheit+, through Lotto24. Every ticket sold supports educational projects. In 2022, ZEAL Network received the follow-up license for lottery brokerage in Germany for Lotto24 AG, which is valid until 2029. In April 2023, ZEAL Network and its subsidiary Lotto24 received permission to organize virtual slot machine games on the Internet. In 2024, the first Traumhausverlosung (“dream house raffle”) took place, a charity lottery organized by ZEAL subsidiary Dreamify gGmbH. A portion of their revenue goes to selected nonprofit organizations, such as the DKMS. Since 2026, this subsidiary has also been offering the Traumautoverlosung (“Dream Car Raffle”). Here, too, a portion of the proceeds goes to support social projects and nonprofit organizations.

In July 2026, ZEAL acquired the remaining 96.5 percent of the shares in SevenCanyon Limited, a UK-based operator of prize draw platforms including 7days Performance, Redline Competitions and UK Carp Competitions, in which ZEAL already held a 3.5 percent stake. The transaction, comprising a cash purchase price of approximately GBP 33.8 million and an earn-out payment of up to GBP 4.8 million, marked the company's entry into the UK prize draw market.

== Company ==
The company is managed by a three-member executive board, headed by Stefan Tweraser. The supervisory board consists of six members, headed by Carola Gräfin von Schmettow. The company had 265 employees at the end of 2025. The company has offices in Hamburg, London and Madrid. ZEAL Network has been a member of the World Lottery Association, an international organization that promotes the interests of state-licensed lotteries and related service providers, since 2023. Since April 2025, the company has also been a member of the Deutscher Online-Casinoverband (“German Online Casino Association”).

The company operates on the market with its brands Lotto24, Tipp24, ZEAL Iberia, ZEAL Instant Games, ZEAL Ventures, freiheit+, Traumhausverlosung, Traumautoverlosung, and, through its subsidiary SevenCanyon Limited, 7days Performance, Redline Competitions, and UK Carp Competitions. The focus of Lotto24 and Tipp24 is on the brokerage of state-organized and own lotteries on the Internet, the main market is Germany. ZEAL Iberia is a partner of ONCE, a public organization for the blind in Spain, which is also known for its lotteries. ZEAL Instant Games is active in the games business, particularly with cooperation partners in the USA and South America. ZEAL Ventures invests in industry-specific start-ups. freiheit+, Traumhausverlosung, and Traumautoverlosung are charity lotteries in Germany.

According to its own information, the company has 1.56 million active lottery customers per month, billings amounted to EUR 1.10 billion in 2025 (as of December 2025).
