= Perimeter 81 =

Israeli computer security software company

- Type: Privately owned
- Industry: Computer security software; network security
- Founded: 2018; 8 years ago
- Founder: Sagi Gidali; Amit Bareket
- Headquarters: Tel Aviv, Israel; with offices in New York City and Los Angeles
- Area served: Worldwide
- Key people: Sagi Gidali (CGO); Amit Bareket (CEO)
- Services: Security Service Edge (SSE) and zero trust network access (ZTNA)
- Owner: Check Point (2023–present)
- Number of employees: 250
- Website: www.perimeter81.com

Perimeter 81 is an Israeli cloud and network security company that develops secure remote networks, based on the zero trust architecture, for organizations. Its technology replaces legacy security appliances like VPNs and firewalls.

Since 2023, Perimeter 81 has been owned by the American-Israeli multinational cybersecurity company Check Point and renamed to "Harmony SASE.".

== History ==
The company was founded in 2018 by Sagi Gidali and Amit Bareket, founders of SaferVPN which was acquired by J2 Global. The SaferVPN network infrastructure, which was developed over six years, served as the basis for Perimeter 81's initial product development.

Based in Tel Aviv, Israel, it raised 19.5 million dollars in three funding rounds during 2019–2020, including investments from USA's SonicWall (Francisco Partners), Toba Capital and Israel's Spring Ventures led by Aviv Refuah. In August 2020, two months after raising funds at 100 million dollars valuation, it completed a $40 million Series B financing round at a company valuation of $160 million.

In June 2022 it completed a Series C financing round led by the USA's B Capital, with the participation of Insight Partners, Entree Capital, Toba Capital and ION Crossover Ventures. It has raised $100 million, at a $1b valuation, becoming a unicorn. The company has over 2,500 clients, among them Fortune 500 companies, as well as small and medium-sized enterprises.

In August 2023, it was reported that the company would be acquired for $490 million by Check Point.

== Technology ==
The company develops a converged networking and security cloud edge delivered in a software as a service model. It offers global gateway deployment and multi-tenant management, allowing the distributed workforce to securely access company resources, whether these are located in the cloud or on-premises. The platform intends to replace the traditional vpn service with a firewall as a service (FWaaS) solution. It is a user-centric security bearing, dedicated to preventing password theft attacks. It protects online users by using a secure web gateway, replacing multiprotocol label switching and enabling connection between offices via SD-WAN.

Perimeter 81 offers its service through the Ingram cloud marketplace and has partnered with SentinelOne to deliver unified network and endpoint security. The company also partnered with SonicWall to incorporate cyber security and firewall features in its secure access service edge (SASE) platform. The company also won the cybersecurity vendor achievement of the year, a cybersecurity breakthrough award and was the finalist in the NYCx cybersecurity moonshot challenge, held by Jerusalem Venture Partners, together with the New York Mayor’s office. It was chosen as one of the five leading companies in zero-trust network access by Forrester Research.

== See also ==
- List of unicorn startup companies
- Science and technology in Israel
- Silicon Wadi
