= Vodafone Germany =

German telecommunications provider

Vodafone GmbH

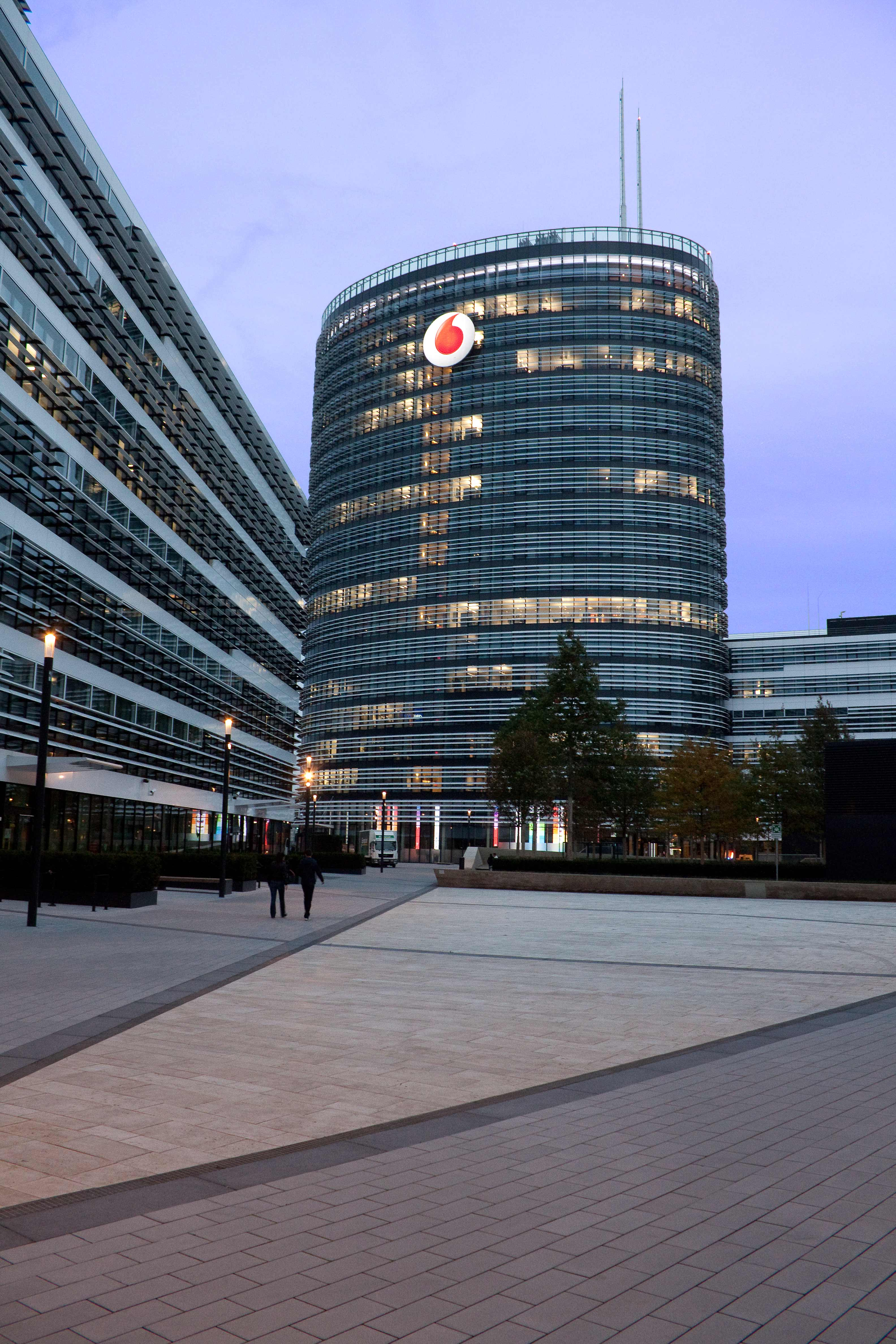
- Vodafone Deutschland's headquarters in Düsseldorf
- Company type: Private
- Industry: Telecommunications
- Founded: 1990; 36 years ago (as Mannesmann Mobilfunk GmbH); 2002; 24 years ago (as Vodafone D2 GmbH)
- Headquarters: Düsseldorf, Germany
- Key people: Marcel de Groot (CEO)
- Products: Prepaid and postpaid mobile phones, DSL, IPTV, cable internet, cable television
- Revenue: 11,616,000,000 euro (2022)
- Number of employees: 16,000
- Parent: Vodafone Group Plc
- Website: vodafone.de

Vodafone GmbH is a telecommunications operator in Germany owned by Vodafone Group Plc and headquartered in Düsseldorf. It provides mobile phone, LTE, 5G, cable internet, landlines, cable TV, and IPTV services. As of the first quarter of 2024, Vodafone GmbH has more than 30 million mobile customers in Germany, making it the third-largest provider of mobile phone services in Germany. The company's headquarters are in the suburb of Heerdt in Düsseldorf, with regional offices throughout Germany. Vodafone Germany's main competitors are 1&1 Mobilfunk, Telekom Deutschland (Deutsche Telekom's German private customer unit) and Telefónica Germany.

Vodafone Germany's network serves both prepaid and postpaid customers on GSM and LTE (Long Term Evolution). In July 2019, Vodafone started providing 5G services. By the end of March 2024, Vodafone had 30.4 million mobile phone or mobile internet customers and 10.21 million customers with a DSL / VDSL connection.

== History ==
The company in its present form resulted from Vodafone's takeover of the German engineering group Mannesmann GmbH in 2000. On 8 December 1989, the West German Federal Ministry for Posts and Telecommunications (Bundesministerium für Post und Telekommunikation; one of several predecessors of the present-day Bundesnetzagentur) awarded the second digital GSM-900 (also known as D-Netz (D-Netz; D-Network in Germany) network in Germany to Mannesmann, as the first private company in Germany to break the monopoly of the telecommunications services operated by Deutsche Bundespost (now Deutsche Telekom). This licence was subsequently expanded to cover the former East Germany after German reunification in 1991. Mannesmann subsequently began operations of its mobile network on 30 June 1992. It was rebranded Vodafone D2 in 2002.

In February 2011, Vodafone Germany started providing IPTV via DSL and VDSL connections. In April 2011, Vodafone Germany started to distribute Disney content via IPTV.

Following Deutsche Telekom, Vodafone Germany started selling the Apple iPhone 4S in September 2011.

As of 2014, the company owns around 75% of Kabel Deutschland and in 2019 Unitymedia was merged with Vodafone.

In February 2020, the Unitymedia brand was phased out from market, by Vodafone Germany.

== Sponsorship ==
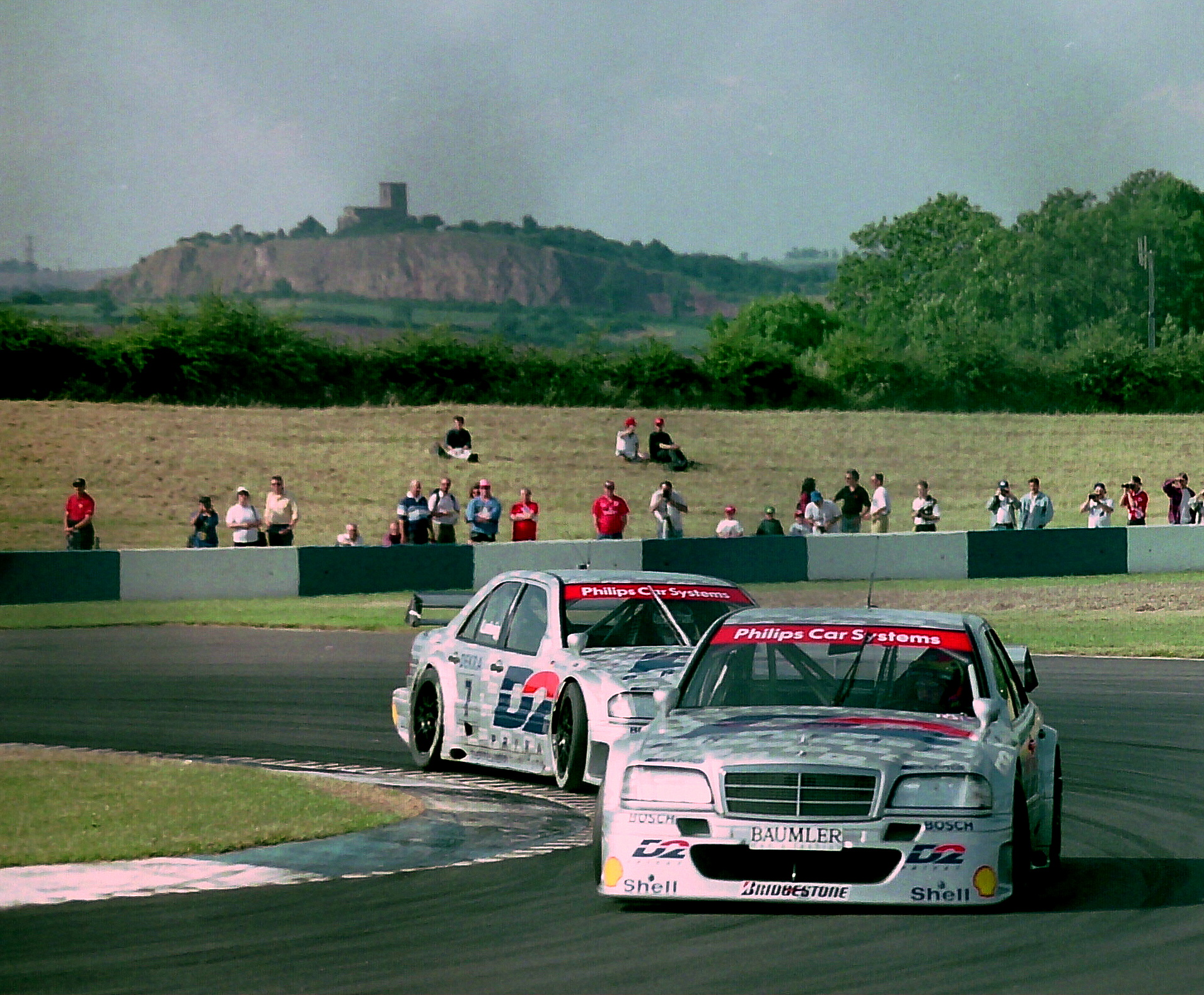
D2 sponsored Mercedes in several motorsport championships in the 1990s, including the German DTM series.

The company sponsored the AMG-Mercedes team in the FIA GT Championship, both Deutsche Tourenwagen Meisterschaft and Deutsche Tourenwagen Masters, 24 Hours of Le Mans under the D2 naming.

The company also sponsors RAM Racing in the British GT Championship and the Gulf 12 Hours.

== See also ==
- List of mobile network operators in Europe
