= SaferVPN =

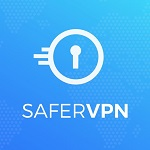
- Developer: Safer Social Ltd.
- Release: March 2013
- Final release: 4.9 / 1 December 2017; 8 years ago
- Operating system: Windows, macOS, Android, iOS, Windows Phone, Linux, Google Chrome extension, Mozilla add on
- Platform: Computer
- Successor: StrongVPN
- Size: 9.7MB
- Available in: English, German, French, Russian, Arabic, Persian, Vietnamese, Chinese, Japanese, Korean, Portuguese, Spanish and Turkish
- Type: VPN
- License: Commercial
- Website: safervpn.com

SaferVPN was a VPN service developed by the Israeli company Safer Social, Ltd.

== History ==
SaferVPN was released in 2013 by Amit Bareket and Sagi Gidali. SaferVPN network infrastructure served as the basis of Bareket's and Gidali's next company, Perimeter 81. The service was acquired by J2 Global in 2019 Q3 and was eventually merged into StrongVPN.

On December 6, 2023 SaferVPN sent an email notifying customers of SaferVPN ending as on December 15, 2023.

== Technology ==
SaferVPN utilized the protocols OpenVPN, PPTP, L2TP and IKEv2.

== See also ==
- Comparison of virtual private network services
