= Ralph Dommermuth =

German businessman (born 1963)

- Born: 1963 (age 62–63)
- Occupations: Chairman and CEO, United Internet
- Spouse: Judith Berger
- Children: 1

Ralph Dommermuth (born 1963) is a German businessman, the founder, chairman and CEO of United Internet.

== Career ==
Dommermuth was born in 1963 and raised as the son of a realtor in Montabaur, Germany. He has one brother. After initial training at the Deutsche Bank, he started to work as a sales freelancer for a local PC dealer in his hometown Montabaur in 1983.

In 1988, Dommermuth founded the 1&1 EDV Marketing GmbH together with a business partner. The first business idea was called "Software Börse", a marketing tool for software companies. For this product the company won the German direct marketing prize in 1989. The Company also organized special exhibitions at the CEBIT in Hannover, such as the "Software-Zentrum Mittelstand" and "Software for Europe." In 1992, his company 1&1 was commissioned by Deutsche Telekom to sell Bildschirmtext-access-points and later T-Online accounts.

After the initial success as a marketing service provider Dommermuth converted 1&1 into an internet service provider, beginning in 1996. In March 1998, the company had its IPO as the first German Internet company. Due to the capital increase carried out in this context, 1&1 had opportunity to participate in other IT companies such as GMX and Schlund + Partner AG. At the height of the internet boom in the early 2000s, 1&1 Holding held shares in 17 internet companies and Dommermuth renamed the company to United Internet.

Dommermuth owns 42% of United Internet, the Germany-headquartered broadband provider, which manages brands such as 1&1, GMX and Web.de, with 2020 turnover of Euro 5.4 billion, and 66 million accounts in 17 countries.

From August 2014 to June 2015, he was a member of the Supervisory Board of United Internet's investment Rocket Internet. In summer 2017, United Internet contributed its subsidiary 1&1 Telecommunication SE to Drillisch AG and received new Drillisch shares in return. In total, United Internet owns over 75% of the renamed 1&1 Drillisch AG in January 2018. On 1 January 2018, Dommermuth also took over as Chairman of the Management Board of this company, which was renamed again in 2021 and now operates as 1&1 AG.

1&1 AG successfully participated in the 5G frequency auction of the German Federal Network Agency in 2019. Dommermuth thus laid the foundation for the construction of a fourth mobile network in Germany. In August 2021, the company announced its intention to build Europe's most innovative mobile network based on the new OpenRAN technology together with the Japanese tech group Rakuten. Construction of the mobile network is scheduled to start in the same year.

1&1 will be Borussia Dortmund's shirt sponsor at Bundesliga matches from the 2020/21 season. For all international competitions, the DFB Cup and test matches abroad, the previous shirt sponsor Evonik Industries would remain on the jerseys. Evonik Industries then sold just under 5 percent of its shares in Borussia Dortmund GmbH & Co. KGaA and reduced its stake to 9.8 percent. Dommermuth acquired a 5.0 percent stake in Borussia Dortmund through his Ralph Dommermuth Beteiligungen GmbH in early March 2020.

Dommermuth is Germany's sole Internet billionaire, and the country's youngest self-made billionaire.

== Donations ==
In 2017, when federal elections took place in Germany, the largest donation to a political party was provided by Dommermuth, Euro 500,000 Euro to the CDU, Germany's conservative party.

In September 2006, Ralph Dommermuth founded the United Internet for UNICEF foundation with the aim of improving the living situation of children and people in need by raising donations To this end, United Internet's marketing machine was used for donation doubling campaigns and users of WEB.DE, GMX and 1&1 were asked to make donations at regular intervals. With more than EUR 50 million, the foundation is one of UNICEF's biggest individual donors and was awarded the newly created "Gustav Rau Prize" in 2014 and "Partner of the Year" by UNICEF Germany in 2016. Dommermuth was the first to receive the award.

In 2013, Dommermuth founded the Westerwelle Foundation together with former Foreign Minister, Guido Westerwelle. The foundation is based in Berlin and aims to promote international understanding and strengthen democracy and the market economy, the rule of law and tolerance in so-called emerging countries.

The Ralph and Judith Dommermuth Foundation provided financial support for charitable projects and has been operating the platform "Wir zusammen" (We Together) since the beginning of 2016. There, projects of German business for the social integration of refugees and for integration into the working world are presented. The platform was initiated by 36 companies, and over 200 well-known companies are now involved. With an advertising campaign, "We Together" motivates other companies and their employees to become active as well.

In 2007, Dommermuth facilitated the first participation of a German boat in the America's Cup with the newly founded United Internet Team Germany. On 29 April 2005, the team was accepted as a challenger for the 32nd America's Cup just hours before the closing date. In addition to the advertising budget provided by United Internet, Dommermuth invested around EUR 20 million from his assets in the project.

== Personal life ==
Dommermuth has a child from an earlier marriage. He is married to Judith Berger, a model / fashion entrepreneur, and they live in Montabaur.
