= CounterSpy (security software) =

Windows-platform based spyware removal tool

- Developer(s): Sunbelt Software
- Stable release: 4.0.3275 / April 2010
- Operating system: Microsoft Windows
- Type: Anti-spyware
- License: Proprietary
- Website: www.sunbeltsoftware.com

CounterSpy is a proprietary spyware removal program for Microsoft Windows software developed by Sunbelt Software.

== Features ==
CounterSpy scans a PC for spyware, examining files on the hard drive, objects in memory, the Windows registry and cookies and it has a capability called DNR (Do Not Resuscitate) that, according to Sunbelt, improves the chances of killing off resuscitators. In the past, the tool was based on and used GIANT AntiSpyware's engine. The program is currently at version 3.1. Sunbelt Software released version 2, which includes a revamped interface and smaller memory footprint.

It was available for download as a 15-day trial version, but effective May 23, 2011, CounterSpy was discontinued and is no longer available for purchase.
