= EPages =

Online shopping software

ePages
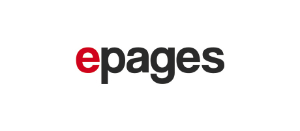
- Developer: ePages GmbH
- Written in: HTML5, CSS 3, JavaScript, XML, Perl, C++, Java
- Operating system: Cross-platform
- Type: Online shopping, Shopping cart
- Website: www.epages.com

ePages is an e-commerce software that allows merchants to create and run online shops in the cloud. The number of shops based on ePages is currently 140,000 worldwide. ePages software is regularly updated due to its Software-as-a-Service model. An investor in the company is United Internet, with a 25% stake. ePages focuses upon distributing its products mainly through hosting providers. ePages is headquartered in Hamburg, with additional offices Barcelona, Jena, and Bilbao.

== History ==
The name ePages was used for the first time for software in 1997 to market "Intershop ePages". In 2002, the product line then called Intershop 4 was taken over by ePages GmbH and renamed to ePages.

== Features ==
Depending on the ePages product and packages offered by hosting providers, merchants can sell up to an unlimited number of items. Users can offer their products and services in 15 languages and with all currencies. With ePages, merchants can use web marketing tools; e.g. newsletters, coupons or social media plug-ins for social commerce.
