= SkillPages =

Social platform for finding skilled people

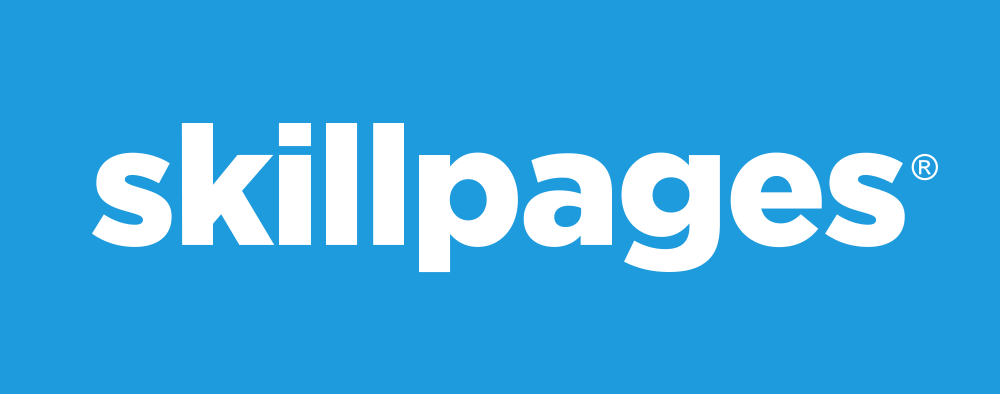
- Website type: Social Directory
- Available in: English
- Dissolved: 2015
- Owners: Iain MacDonald & Michael Gallagher
- Website: www.skillpages.com
- Commercial: Yes
- Launched: 2011
- Current status: part of Bark.com; no longer has a separate existence

SkillPages was a social platform for finding skilled people and had over 20 million users on the platform from over 160 countries. The CEO was Laura Shesgreen who was appointed after the company's co-founder and former CEO Iain MacDonald stepped down unexpectedly in 2013 due to sudden illness.

In December 2014, the Directors of the company sought the appointment of a provisional liquidator and said the company was for sale. On 2 February 2015, SkillPages announced that they had been purchased by London-based Bark.com.

The website was available in English and Spanish. It now redirects to Bark.com. The company was based in Dublin, Ireland, with offices in Palo Alto, CA, USA, and in Singapore.

== Description ==
On SkillPages, members created a profile that displayed their skills through multimedia (images, videos and status updates). Users who are looking for skilled people could post jobs or directly mail people on the platform that had the skills they are looking for. SkillPages was available on desktop, iOS and Android.

== Weedle ==
In 2009 by MacDonald and Michael Gallagher launched a private beta website called Weedle. MacDonald sold his previous company Perlico to Vodafone for €80,000,000 in 2007.

In March 2010 Taoiseach Brian Cowen, Prime Minister of Ireland, announced that Weedle had received funding of $4,000,000 to expand into the US and other global regions. Weedle investors included Dr Michael Smurfit and Weedle's co-founder and CEO MacDonald as well as the Irish government agency, Enterprise Ireland.

"Weedle is a leading-edge high-tech company developing as part of Ireland’s knowledge economy," said Cowen. "Weedle’s internet platform is a shining example of world-class research and development being used to create innovative technology with global reach and appeal."

== SkillPages launch ==
In January 2011, Weedle relaunched as SkillPages.

The name SkillPages was chosen because it was the closest "one word" description of what the company does. MacDonald said it is difficult to fully explain a new concept in just one sentence or one word, but the name SkillPages clearly explained the "skill" focus of the company.

SkillPages reached 1,000,000 registered members in its first 150 days.

In June 2011, Irish Government Minister for Jobs, Enterprise and Innovation, Richard Bruton TD, welcomed the launch of a new feature called "Opportunities" during the official opening of the company's newly expanded headquarters in Blackrock, County Dublin, Ireland.

Minister Bruton said: "Today I am delighted to see in SkillPages the great success that can come from a combination of government support, partnership with universities and innovative people. We in Ireland must not only build on our traditional strengths to attract international companies here, but also learn from the highly innovative companies we already have here to drive a generation of Irish start-ups."

Referring to the new feature, MacDonald said that members can create an "Opportunity" detailing what skilled person they are looking for. Other members of SkillPages can then view these Opportunities, get presented with those that are relevant to their own skillsets and/or forward Opportunities to someone they know who might be interested.

The new feature was the culmination of extensive research by the R&D team in SkillPages with the assistance of CLARITY, the joint University College Dublin, Trinity College and Dublin City University computer science research initiative funded by Science Foundation Ireland. The Opportunities feature was later renamed Jobs.

By SkillPages' first anniversary in February 2012, the platform had reached 3 million members. At this point, 170 million social connections had been imported into SkillPages. The top five skills on the platform were photographers, software engineers, graphic designers, signers and writers. SkillPages users were creating 100,000 opportunities daily.

By June 2012, SkillPages had 5 million members. The company announced that it had raised $9.5 million in a Series B round of funding from previous investors, including the Irish VC firm ACT Venture Capital. This brought the total investment in the company to over $22.1 million.

== SkillPages 2 ==
In November 2012, SkillPages 2 was launched. It consisted of feature improvements including a dedicated dashboard and owner area, the ability to add up to six skills, each with unique cover shots, photos, video, text updates and more. Each SkillPage could be searched for independently and found by people using SkillPages and Google.

A discover area and discovery stream were added to users' dashboards to help users find people with similar skills. The ProPages feature allowed users to create a personal website for their skills with a unique domain name. Version 2 also integrated the users' social networks directly with SkillPages so users would not need to rebuild their contact lists on SkillPages.

== Features ==
On 30 November 2012, SkillPages launched in North America.

At that point, 24 per cent of SkillPages' traffic came from mobile devices. As a result, in November 2012, an iOS app was released. On the app users could find skilled people anywhere in the world, browse profiles of people on the platform and post a job. Those looking for work could post their skills and find job opportunities. The app also offered in-app messaging and calling, and push notifications.

In February 2013, SkillPages launched a new profile page allowing users to create a skill portfolio, directly connect with other SkillPages users and verify their profiles with their other social networks. The profile was enhanced in July 2013 to include new features such as in-situ editing. It also allowed users to add projects and work experience and to organize their skills.

SkillPages released an Android app in July 2013. On the app, users could find skilled people, browse profiles, add skills and upload examples of their work. New features were to be released on the Android and iOS apps simultaneously.

In August 2013, SkillPages released two additional features. The Recommendations feature allowed users to rate each other's skills. The Trusted Network feature allowed users to find people they knew on the platform.

== Trusted network ==
SkillPages aimed to create trusted networks using members' social connections, including Facebook, Google+ and email contacts.

SkillPages officially launched its integration with Google+ on 15 May 2013. The integration was showcased at Google I/O in the Google+ Developer Sandbox. The feature allowed people to join and log into SkillPages using their Google+ account across desktop, iOS and Android. Users could share interactive posts to their Google+ Circles and ask their connections in Google+ to recommend their skills. Also, when users connected with Google+ they could see if they shared a social connection with other people on SkillPages, based on the people in their Google+ circles.

== Corporate affairs ==
Laura Shesgreen, who had been a board member at SkillPages since 2012, was appointed as chief executive in January 2014.

Previously, Shesgreen was CFO of Skype when it was owned by eBay. Prior to that Shesgreen was CFO of evite, PointCast (dotcom) and NTERA Limited.

In April 2014, former Enterprise Ireland CEO Dan Flinter was appointed as chairman of SkillPages. Flinter also serves as chairman of The Irish Times Ltd, Project Management Holdings and Duolog Holdings. He is a board member of Venture Capital Investment Managers as well as Dairygold Co-op.

=== Provisional Liquidation ===
In December 2014 a provisional liquidator was appointed to SkillPages after the directors (Laura Shesgreen, Jim Mountjoy, Barry Joseph Smith and Dan Flinter) petitioned to have a provisional liquidator appointed, with accumulated losses of over €24m.

=== Purchase by Bark.com ===
On Monday 2 February 2015, SkillPages announced that they had been purchased by London-based Bark.com, and that they were in the process of activating SkillPages accounts within Bark.com.

== Reception ==
SkillPages won the ITLG/Irish Times technology company of the year award in April 2011. and was shortlisted for a Europa award in January 2013.

== Spam and blocking ==
In November and December 2012, emails from SkillPages were blocked by several educational institutions due to the method of inviting friends to join the website used by SkillPages leading to a high complaint rate. New users were encouraged to give SkillPages access to their various address books or Gmail accounts, in order to invite all their contacts to join SkillPages. Many people complained that SkillPages gained access to their Gmail account and sent spam invitations to all their contacts without clear indication beforehand.
