= Protus =

Software company in Canada

- Company type: privately held
- Industry: software
- Founded: 1997
- Headquarters: Ottawa, Ontario, Canada
- Area served: Worldwide
- Number of employees: 200

Protus IP Solutions Inc. provided software-as-a-service communication tools designed for small to medium businesses. Founded in 1997, Protus was a privately held company based in Ottawa, Canada which had approximately 200 employees and over 500,000 subscribers worldwide, offering its services in sixteen countries.

== History ==
The company was originally founded by Simon Nehme, a computer engineering alumnus from the University of Ottawa, however later added Joseph A. Nour as co-founder. Nehme served as the company's Chief Technology Officer (CTO) for 12 years, overseeing its growth from a startup to an international mid-size business.

== Litigation ==
Protus was one of multiple targets of j2 Global litigation, in which that company accused a long list of rival vendors of patent infringement. J2 Global's allegations of patent infringement date to 2008. An attempt by j2 Global to acquire Protus-confidential business information through letters rogatory was rejected by an Ontario court in 2009 with full costs awarded to Protus. In December 2010, j2 Global changed its tactics, eliminating Protus as a competitor by buying the company outright for $213 million in cash.

Protus was also the target of a 2010 lawsuit in Maryland in which AGV Sports Group alleged violation of the federal Telephone Consumer Protection Act and the Maryland Telephone Consumer Protection Act through the transmission of hundreds of unsolicited facsimile advertisements promoting travel packages, health care discounts, toner, office equipment, life insurance, mortgages and other products and services. The Junk Fax Prevention Act of 2005 and CAN-SPAM Act of 2003 had amended the federal Telephone Consumer Protection Act to close a loophole formerly exploited to send unsolicited junk faxes to US recipients from outside the country.
