= Ben Neumann =

American film producer (1966–2020)

- Born: Bernd Neumann; May 27, 1966; Krefeld, North Rhine-Westphalia, West Germany
- Died: February 5, 2020 (aged 53)
- Occupation(s): Businessperson; Entrepreneur; Chief Executive Officer; Mixed Martial Artist; Producer
- Years active: 1984–2020
- Children: 2 sons
- Website: http://www.benneumann.com/

Ben R. Neumann (born Bernd Neumann; May 27, 1966 – February 5, 2020) was an American entrepreneur, investor, film producer and mixed martial artist, best known for founding early Internet hosting service Internet Communication Icom.com, and his subsequent investments into companies such as iBoost.com, Globat.com, FatCow.com and his work in the motion picture industry. Some of Ben's more recent ventures were the content delivery networks NetDNA, MaxCDN and HDDN, which he co-founded together with business partner and protégé Chris Ueland in October 2009. In 2011, through his consulting firm Innovative Currency, Ben ventured outside the technology field and created his unique coaching programs InspireMoreHeroes and MillionairesMentor. He helped others with his innovative way of marketing and creating leads.

Neumann, a former bodyguard, and avid martial artist since second grade, who grew up in Krefeld, Germany in a working-class family, immigrated to the United States from Germany in 1994. While working on his martial arts career and after winning several mixed martial arts tournaments, he successfully built and sold his first U.S.-based technology company Icom.com at the pinnacle of the Dot-com bubble in 1998, a move that made him one of the original Internet pioneers. He subsequently began investing into other technology and real estate companies and became involved with film making in Los Angeles in early 2004, when he was approached by an independent filmmaker. The result of this partnership was Dark World, starring Michael Pare and Theresa Russell. Neumann also produced or was involved with other notable films and TV shows, such as American Idol, The Apprentice, Grey's Anatomy, House M.D., Only in LA, You, Me, Love and Smile of April. He continued to invest in local niche companies and became an engaged community activist. In March 2006 Neumann was elected to the Board of the Studio City Neighborhood Council and was President of the Council from March 2008 until June 2010.

As a successful immigrant entrepreneur, Neumann has been quoted off-line and online in numerous ezines, magazines and books. For his achievements in the technology sector he was nominated for Ernst & Young's Entrepreneur of the Year award in 2000 and 2003.

He died in February 2020 after suffering a heart attack.

== Mixed Martial Arts Record ==
Professional record breakdown
22 matches	20 wins	2 losses
By knockout	14	2
By submission	4	0
By decision	2	0
