= StackPath =

American information technology company

- Type: Private company
- Industry: Edge computing
- Founded: 2015
- Defunct: June 12, 2024
- Fate: Dissolved
- Headquarters: Dallas, Texas, USA
- Products: Virtual machines; Containers; Content delivery network; Web application firewall; DDoS mitigation
- Number of employees: 250
- ASN: 33438
- Website: stackpath.com

StackPath was an American edge computing platform provider headquartered in Dallas, Texas. Its founding team was led by Lance Crosby, who also co-founded SoftLayer Technologies, acquired by IBM in 2013.

== Acquisitions ==
- MaxCDN (CDN), 2016
- Staminus (DDoS mitigation), 2016
- Fireblade (WAF), 2016
- Cloak (VPN), 2016
- Highwinds Network Group (CDN and VPN), 2017
- Server Density (Monitoring)

== Subsidiaries ==
=== MaxCDN ===
NetDNA, LLC was founded in 2009 as a content delivery network (CDN) with a focus on enterprise customers. The company was founded by David Henzel and Christopher Ueland in Los Angeles.

In 2010, NetDNA partnered with Wowza to launch the HDDN.com brand, a CDN for streaming video.

By 2010, the MaxCDN brand was created as a simpler CDN for both small and large businesses. MaxCDN, LLC operated as a division of NetDNA, LLC.

In 2011, Ben Neumann was CEO of NetDNA. In 2011, NetDNA completed a funding round with Chelsea Management in Los Angeles.

In 2013, NetDNA rebranded the company and its services as MaxCDN, conslidating other services such as HDDN.com under the same name, with the original NetDNA enterprise service rebranded as MaxCDN Enterprise.

MaxCDN was acquired by StackPath in 2016.

StackPath announced on June 12, 2024 that it would close all products and liquidate all assets.

== Divestitures ==
In 2019, StackPath sold its VPN lines of business, including IPVanish (acquired as part of the Highwinds Network Group) and Encrypt.me (the new brand of Cloak), to J2 Global.

In August 2023, StackPath sold its CDN line of business (primarily approximately 100 select enterprise customer contracts as well as other assets) to Akamai following its decision to cease its content delivery network operations. The transaction did not include the acquisition of StackPath personnel or technology.

== Investors ==
StackPath has received funding from investors including Abry Partners, Juniper Networks, and Cox Communications.

== Founders ==
StackPath was founded May 5, 2015, by Lance Crosby, Greg Bock, Steven Canale, Ryan Carter, Paul Drew, Kenji Fukasawa, Jason Gulledge, Andrew Higginbotham, James Leaverton, Andrew Maten, Dawn Mumm, Nick Nelson, and Josh Reese.
