= Modem sharing device =

Modem sharing device for sharing serial connections Login Password:

A modem sharing device, also called a line sharing device, modem sharer or line sharer, allows multiple Binary Synchronous Communications devices to share a serial connection. Synchronous and asynchronous datastreams are supported. A common example was a Tandem host connected to automatic teller machines, with a modem or router in between.
