= Fireblade (company) =

FireBlade
- Industry: website security
- Headquarters: Tel Aviv, Israel
- Area served: worldwide
- Key people: Shay Rapaport (CEO); Erez Azaria (CTO)
- Products: website security software
- Parent: StackPath
- Website: www.fireblade.com

Fireblade (acquired by StackPath) is an Israeli company founded in 2008. It developed the first cloud-based bot-management solution and a multi-tier SaaS security suite powered by reputational and behavioral firewalls, to protect websites against DDoS attacks, web application attacks and a variety of automated attacks, improving website health, security and performance. It offers integration with cPanel and WHM Fireblade was founded by Shay Rapaport and Erez Azaria (CEO and CTO respectively).

Fireblade's extensive bot management solution offers protection against credential stuffing, brute force attacks, application layer DDoS attacks, web spam and scraping It also offers dynamic performance optimization, a 30 Points of Presence tier-1 CDN and other tools.

== Features ==
- Protection against
  - DDoS attacks
  - Spam, scraping and abuse control
  - CMS vulnerability exploitation
  - Brute force login/password attack
  - Web application attacks
  - Firewalls: reputational an behavioral
  - On top of a traditional firewall, these firewalls scan the behavior and the context, searching for possible attacks or threats and to expose which is human and which is a machine/bot.
- Dynamic site optimization
- A tier-1 CDN access with 30 global Points of Presence
- Load balancer and failover
- Monitoring tools
  - Uptime monitoring
  - Health & performance analytics
  - Security Forensic
  - Real-time alerts
- Mobile application for monitoring
