= 1&1 AG =

German telecommunication service

- Type: Aktiengesellschaft
- Traded as: 1u1
- Founded: 1988; 38 years ago
- Headquarters: Montabaur, Germany
- Number of locations: 11 locations throughout Germany
- Area served: Germany
- Key people: Ralph Dommermuth (Chairman and CEO)
- Products: Fixed-line telephone; Mobile telephony; Broadband; Internet services
- Services: mobile tariffs and broadband services
- Revenue: €4.14 billion (2025)
- Number of employees: 4,678 (average, 2025)
- Website: www.1und1.ag

1&1 AG (known until 2 June 2021 as: 1&1 Drillisch Aktiengesellschaft) is a German telecommunications service and landline and mobile telecommunications provider headquartered in Montabaur, Rhineland-Palatinate and listed on the TecDAX. Since 2017, the majority of the company has belonged to United Internet.

At the end of 2021, 1&1 employed 3,167 people and reported revenue of 3.91 billion Euros by the end of the fiscal year. As of 31 December 2021, 1&1 had about 15.4 million customer contracts, 11.2 million of which were for mobile services and 4.2 million for broadband internet. 1&1 Mobilfunk's main competitors are Telekom Deutschland (Deutsche Telekom's German private customer unit), Telefónica Germany and Vodafone Germany.

== Infrastructure ==
For its mobile services, the company relies on the network infrastructures of Telefónica Germany (all brands) as well as that of Vodafone Germany (1&1 brand). Due to the requirements of antitrust authorities regarding the merger between E-Plus and Telefónica, Drillisch was able to secure 30% of Telefónica's network capacity. Historically, the company relies on the networks of other providers as well as its own 1&1 Versatel network for its DSL (Digital Subscriber Line) and fiber-optics services. With 1&1 Versatel, its parent company, United Internet, owns its own landline infrastructure operates more and more customer connections with its own broadband supply.

In the sale by auction of 5G frequencies in 2019, the company received the bid for the construction of its own mobile network. Drillisch acquired 50 MHz of spectrum in the 3500 MHz band and 2x10 MHz in the 2100 MHz FDD band. While the network was initially planned to start in 2021, it was later delayed.

A core requirement for 1&1's operations as a network operator is national roaming. The company initially signed a contract with Telefónica Germany in May 2021. However, in August 2023, 1&1 announced a surprise long-term roaming partnership with Vodafone Germany. This agreement was finalized in 2024, enabling 1&1 to use the Vodafone network in areas where its own network is not yet available. By mid-2025, 1&1 had successfully completed the migration of its existing customer base to its own network core.

== Group divisions ==
The core business of mobile services is domiciled in the fully affiliated subsidiaries:

- 1&1 Telecommunication GmbH
  - 1&1 Telecom GmbH
- Drillisch Online GmbH, including:
  - Eteleon
  - handyvertrag.de
  - M2M-Mobil
  - Maxxim
  - n-tv go!
  - PremiumSIM
  - sim.de
  - simplytel
  - smartmobil.de
  - Telco
  - WinSIM
  - yourfone
- Drillisch Logistik GmbH (acquired on 5 May 2015, as The Phone House Telecom GmbH from Dixons Carphone plc)
- IQ-optimize Software AG (for the performance of primarily company-owned IT services for the mobile-services business)

Under the brand names of the Drillisch subsidiaries, primarily mobile-services providers for private customers are marketed via the internet, and M2M products are marketed to businesses. For (a selection of) these products, the mobile networks of both Telefónica and Vodafone are utilized, whereby the products in the Vodafone network generally display a higher average price level than those of Telefónica. Private consumers comprise about 20% of the total business, and business guidelines for the subsidiaries mostly come from the company's central headquarters, meaning that most brands display a similarly structured tariff portfolio. As of 1 April 2014, all providers were introduced to a new tariff structure.

The Maintal subsidiary of Drillisch AG, IQ-optimize Software AG, operated under the name "IQ-work Software AG" until 29 May 2007, and primarily offers technical services for its parent company. To a lesser extent, the company offers similar services to other business clients. In addition to its technical services, IQ-optimize Software AG operates licenses for a "workflow management" software named "Mapito", which was developed in-house.

In September 2014, it became widely known that Drillisch was planning to either construct or acquire up to 600 storefronts from o2/E-Plus, in addition to its usage of 30% of the merger's network capacity. Since an interview on 22 January 2015, it became clear that these shops were slated to operate under the newly acquired brand name "Yourfone".

As of 1 April 2015, the operations of Eteleon AG and MS Mobile Services GmbH were transferred to Drillisch Telecom GmbH within the framework of an internal company restructure. Due to a merger agreement, Eteleon AG was merged into MSP Holding GmbH on 17 March 2015. Yourfone will comprise the storefront premium brand of the company, while Smartmobil will comprise the online premium brand.

On 27 May 2015, it became known that Drillisch would acquire about 300 storefronts from Telefónica Germany. On 24 September 2015, the subsidiary Drillisch Telecom GmbH took on a legal status of a corporation and began to operate as Drillisch Online AG. On 28 December 2017, Heiko Hambücker, Head of Sales and Marketing at Drillisch Online AG, informed the public that the shops would be sold to Aptus, of which René Schuster was the CEO. On 18 July 2018, Drillisch Online AG took on the legal status of a limited-liability company and began to operate as Drillisch Online GmbH. On 23 October 2020, the subsidiary Mobile Ventures GmbH was merged into Drillisch Online GmbH.

== Ownership structure ==
As of 14 April 2022 the ownership structure of 1&1 was comprised as follows:

Shareholder structure (as of 31 December 2025)
Share	Shareholder
86.46%	United Internet AG
13.40%	Public float
4.51%	Norman Rentrop
0.14%	1&1 AG (own shares)
0.07%	Management Board (S. D'Avis, A. Nava)

== History ==
=== Founding and first years ===
In 1957, Fernseh-Hugo Forster OHG was founded, a company whose main activities included the installation of main antenna splitters as well as of communications and surveillance equipment. In 1983, Die Drillisch-Vetriebs-und Servicegesellschaft Nachrichten Technik mbH was founded in Maintal. In 1985, its product line was expanded to include mobile telephones from C-Netz.

In 1989, telefax devices were introduced into the market. From 1991 onward, digital alarm systems for firefighters were also introduced to the market, as well as equipment for fire and rescue control centers.

In 1992, Fernseh-Forster Hugo Forster OHG was converted into Forster Kommunikationselektronik GmbH. Two years later, Drillisch Vetriebs-Serviceges. Nachrichtentechnik mbH & Co. KG was founded and began its operations as a service provider of mobile services for the D2 network. In 1997, Drillisch AG was founded by Hans Jochen Drillisch, Marc Brucherseifer, and Nico Forster. As a formerly legally independent business, the Drillisch Group arose as a subsidiary of Drillisch AG. As a service provider, the company, which at the time owned none of its own network infrastructure, purchased telephone units from network operator Mannesmann Mobilfunk on a large scale, bundled them in special tariff packages, and sold them to private consumers. In their former core business, the sale of mobile telephones, fax devices, and other accessories, the company earned about 48% of its total revenue of 117.5 million marks.

=== Initial public offering ===
The former Drillisch AG had its initial public offering in 1998. A total of up to 600,000 ordinary shares were issued with a nominal value of five marks each (including Greenshoe options of 40,000 shares), from which 360,000 stemmed from an increase in the capital stock to nine million marks and 240,000 shares stemmed from the portfolios of existing shareholders.

In 1998, the company received a landline license. One year later, their offers expanded to include internet-by-call access services.

In 2000, their landline license was sold to Elisa, a Finnish telecommunications firm, and 1&1 reoriented itself towards mobile internet services in order to avoid bankruptcy. The company established the search engine Acoona for web and WAP services. The further expansion of internet content could be observed with the acquisition of Open-Net Oy, a Finnish WAP-programming and content-creation firm.

In 2001, Drillisch became available for sale.

On 16 February 2004, the company UMTS began to market products for D2 Vodafone via subsidiaries Alphatel GmbH and Victorvox AG. On 31 March 2005, the then-board spokesman, Marc Brucherseifer, resigned from leadership of his own volition. Since 2006, board spokesman Paschalis Choulidis planned to united Talkline and Debitel under the name Mobilcom-Debitel, both for tax reasons and due to an increasing saturation of the mobile-phone market.

In January 2007, Drillisch acquired competitor Telco Services GmbH from Idstein im Taunus, which had over 300,000 customers (10% prepaid) for an estimated purchase price of 40 to 50 million euros. On 19 December 2008, it became publicly known that Drillisch AG was in the process of becoming a majority shareholder of eteleon e-solutions AG, a firm specializing in internet-based marketing. The purchase contract of 71.54% was put into effect in March 2009. Since 16 August 2009, eteleon e-solutions AG (100% b2c.de GmbH; discoTEL, DeutschlandSIM, eteleon) became a full subsidiary of Drillisch AG.

=== Attempted takeover by Freenet mobile-communications division and its shareholdings by United Internet ===
Former logo of Drillisch Telecom GmbH

On 22 August 2007, Drillisch announced that their share of 10.07% of competitor Freenet AG would increase to 28.56%. At the time, however, the purchase stood under review of antitrust authorities. In September 2007, Drillisch and United Internet presented to the public a collaborative plan for the acquisition of Freenet. With Holding MSP, Drillisch and United Internet controlled about 29% of Freenet AG. Holding MSP belonged to both companies equally.

In a quarterly report on 31 October 2007, Drillisch CEO Paschalis Choulidis first publicly expressed plans regarding the acquisition of Freenet's mobile-communications division (see Mobilcom). On 20 November 2007, United Internet announced that negotiations for the acquisition of Freenet had failed. By all accounts, Drillisch CEO Choulidis was surprised by this announcement and was only informed of such by a mandatory announcement released by United Internet.

At the end of November 2007, United Internet surprisingly purchased 5.15 million Drillisch shares, thus holding 9.68% of the company. On 14 December, Drillisch and United Internet announced the further increase of MSP Holding GmbH's ownership of Freenet to 20.05%.

On 20 December 2007, Freenet also declared the end of negotiations regarding the acquisition of its mobile-communications division by Drillisch.

In October 2009, United Internet sold its shares of Drillisch AG.

In 2013, Drillisch reduced its share of Freenet from 20.8% to 0.39% in two steps, first in March 2013 and then in October 2013.

On 27 April 2015, United Internet announced its acquisition of a total 20.7% of shares of Drillisch AG, thereby becoming the company's majority shareholder. On 26 May 2015, United Internet's intentions were approved by federal antitrust authorities without any stipulations.

=== Dispute and settlement regarding commission payments with Deutsche Telekom AG ===
In November 2011, Deutsche Telekom canceled its cooperation with Drillisch AG and its subsidiaries without prior notice, as Drillisch subsidiary Simply had been accused of commission fraud with prepaid mobile contracts. According to statements by Manfred Balz from Telekom, since February 2011, Drillisch AG had activated tens of thousands of mobile connections without having any actual customers for them.

Telekom also filed criminal charges against the company. After these events became widely known, the stock prices for Drillisch AG quickly sank up to 44%.

Drillisch decidedly disputed Telekom's accusations and explained that Simply fully complied with the provisions of its Telekom contracts.

On 21 March 2012, Drillisch announced the end of its legal dispute with Deutsche Telekom AG. Both companies entered into an agreement for the clearing and settlement of their contractual relationships and for the end of any pending civil proceedings. One month later, on 19 April 2012, the state attorney's office of Hanau, with approval of the appropriate court, permanently suspended legal action against Drillisch's board of directors and executive team.

=== Cooperation with Telefónica ===
In 2014, when the merger between Telefónica and E-Plus was approved by the EU, albeit under certain conditions, Drillisch received the opportunity to lease 20% of Telefónica's mobile-network capacity. Drillisch's corporate subsidiary, MS Mobile Services GmbH (MS Mobile) entered into the contract in 2015 for a starting period of five years with the potential for extension up to 15 years total. This capacity was made available as Mobile Bitstream Access (MBA) in the form of data transfer and data volume. Until 2020, the used proportion of the total network capacity may be increased to 30%. This contract has made Drillisch the only MBA MVNO on the German mobile-services market.

In this context, Telefónica sold 102 of its own storefronts as well as 199 of its partner shops to the Drillisch Group.

=== Acquisition by United Internet ===
As both companies announced on 12 May 2017, the majority of Drillisch shares would be acquired by United Internet by December 2017 as part of a reverse takeover. It was furthermore planned for United Internet to provide Drillisch AG with its own mobile-network and DSL divisions, namely 1&1 Telecommunication SE, by way of two real capital increases. As the former company boasted a much higher shareholder value, the transaction yielded majority shares of Drillisch for United Internet AG (at least 73.7%). The conglomerate was worth an estimated 3.7 million euros. With over 12 million mobile-services customers, Drillisch would become comparable to freenet AG, to date the fourth-largest service provider of the German market.

Former logo of 1&1 Drillisch AG

In January 2018, the company changed its name from Drillisch Aktiengesellschaft to 1&1 Drillisch Aktiengesellschaft.

On 24 September 2018, 1&1 Drillisch was additionally adopted into the TecDAX listing of MDAX, as part of a restructuring of stock indices.

=== Clearinghouse on internet copyright laws ===
Since February 2021, 1&1 Drillisch has been a member of the Clearingstelle Urheberrechte im Internet (eng. approx. Clearinghouse on internet copyright laws).

== Telecommunications business ==
With 4.3 million DSL retail customers (as of 2018), the brand 1&1 is the third-largest provider of broadband connections in Germany, behind Deutsche Telekom and Vodafone. The DSL connections, which were on the market until June 2007, which required a Telekom landline connection to function, were implemented either by Telekom or by Telefónica Germany via Line-Sharing (excluding ADSL2+) and operated under the name 1&1 DSL. With the integration of VOIP (2004), Video-on-Demand (1&1 in cooperation with Maxdome), and the 1&1 mobile-services tariff (2007) in the DSL-based bundled offer, 1&1 became a Quadruple-Play provider.

In a DSL test carried out by the magazine Connect in July 2015, 1&1 ranked in first place, beating out Telekom, and marketed this fact in a comparative advertisement. Telekom countered with an ad of its own in the same magazine, which played on the poor mobile service of its competitors.

One special characteristic of the 1&1 business is its bundling, whereby hardware is offered in conjunction with a contract. As early as the 1990s, 1&1 achieved wide distribution with its own branded hardware, for example with the modem "1&1 Speedster 14.400". A milestone was reached in cooperation with Berlin manufacturer AVM, who pronounced 1&1 as their biggest client, and whose DSL routers were marketed under the "1&1" brand. Additional examples include, between 2006 and 2010, the mobile email device 1&1 PocketWeb, and, in 2010, the 1&1 SmartPad, which was originally designed as a remote control for the 1&1 MediaCenter, which was introduced in 2008.

== Table of mobile frequencies ==
Frequency band	Technology	Generation	Status	Bandwidth	Note	
2100 MHz	LTE	4G	Planned	20 MHz	from 1 January 2026 until 31 December 2040, up to 200 MBit/s, 5G N1 in DSS process	Band 1
2600 MHz	LTE	4G	Planned	20 MHz	Rented from Telefónica until 30 December 2025, up to 200 MBit/s	Band 7
3.5 GHz	NR	5G	Planned	50 MHz	Until 31 December 2040, up to 1 GBit/s	Band n78

== Marketing campaigns ==
From the beginning of the Bundesliga soccer season 2020/21 until the end of the Bundesliga soccer season 2024/25, Borussia Dortmund was an advertising partner of 1&1.

== See also ==
- List of mobile network operators in Europe
