= Nick Hewer =

English TV presenter and public relations consultant (born 1944)

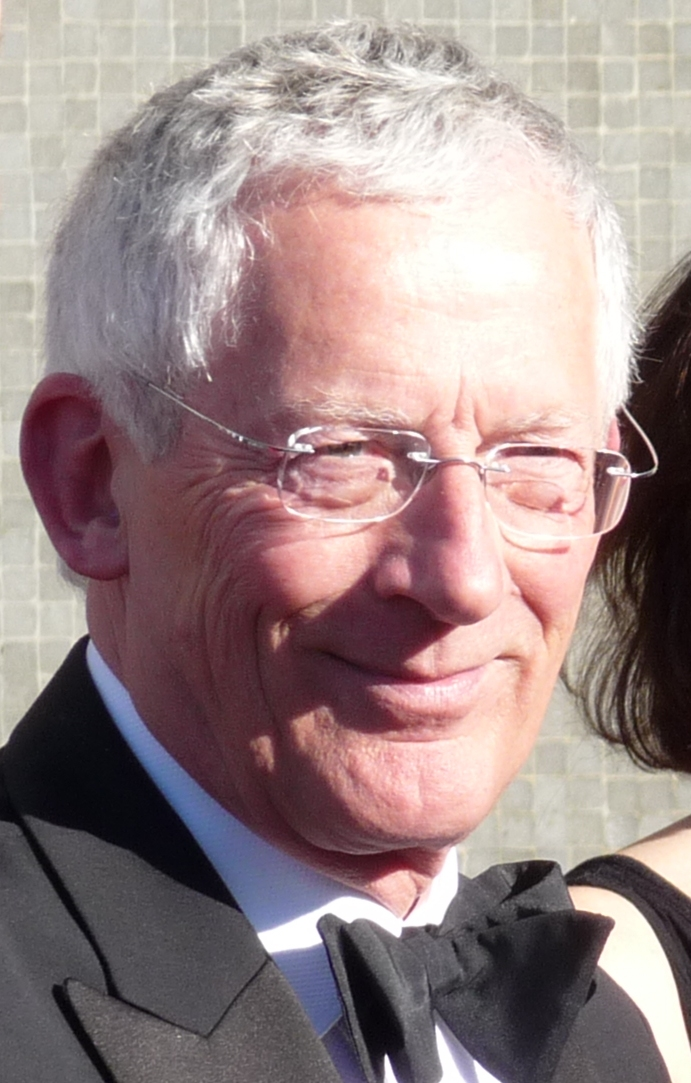
- Hewer in 2009
- Born: Nicholas Radbourn Hewer; 17 February 1944 (age 82); Swindon, Wiltshire, England
- Occupations: Television presenter; public relations consultant
- Years active: 1966–2023
- Television: The Apprentice (2005–2014); Countdown (2012–2021)
- Spouse: Margo Spindler (m. 1973; div. 1985)
- Children: 2

Nicholas Radbourn Hewer (born 17 February 1944) is a British retired television presenter, company director (2010) and former public relations consultant from Swindon, England. From 2005 to 2014, he appeared as Alan Sugar's adviser in the British television series The Apprentice. From 2012 to 2021, he presented the Channel 4 programme Countdown with Rachel Riley and Susie Dent.

== Early life ==
Hewer was born in Swindon on 17 February 1944. His mother was Mary Patricia Hewer (née Jamison; 1918–1999) and his father, John David Radbourn Hewer (1915–2010), was a senior partner of Hewer, Spriggs and Wilson, a veterinary practice in the Old Town area of Swindon. They met when both were university students in Dublin. The family lived in Old Town and Hewer was educated at Clongowes Wood College, a Jesuit boarding school in County Kildare, Ireland. Hewer has two sisters and two brothers.

Hewer's grandfather, John Radbourn Hewer, began as a vet in Swindon in 1912. His maternal grandfather, Oswald Jamison, despite being a Roman Catholic, was High Sheriff of Belfast during the 1920s.

He secured a place to study Law at Trinity College, Dublin, but his parents could not afford the fees for him to go there.

== Career ==
Hewer moved to London in the 1960s, aged 20, to join a public relations (PR) consultancy as a trainee. Within six years, he had joined the board and eventually bought out the owner, becoming the sole shareholder. His PR company was hired by Amstrad to represent them in 1983. He spent 21 years in the Amstrad management group. He sold his PR agency in 1998.

Hewer's status as a businessman and public figure has been used in various ways; for example, in 2012, he was one of many celebrities to help promote the change in the UK pension scheme to automatic enrolment. In 2013, he worked with Vista Print on their "Build Your Small Business" campaign, and in 2014 worked with Bark.com to promote its services marketplace product.

=== Television ===
Hewer and the ex-Amstrad owner Alan Sugar became friends through their working relationship. He became one of Sugar's advisers in The Apprentice on BBC Two (later on BBC One). On 18 December 2014, Hewer revealed that he had decided to leave the show after the tenth series, believing it to be "the appropriate time".

On 9 January 2012, Hewer became the new host of the Channel 4 game show Countdown taking over from the sports presenter Jeff Stelling. On 7 December 2020, Hewer announced that he would be leaving Countdown in 2021. His final episode aired on 25 June; he was replaced by Anne Robinson.

In July 2012, Hewer presented a four-part series on BBC Two called The Farm Fixer, in which he assisted farmers in Northern Ireland in diversifying.

He also presented two BBC One series, The Town that Never Retired and We All Pay Your Benefits with Margaret Mountford.

On 28 August 2013, he was the subject of an episode of BBC One's Who Do You Think You Are?.

In July 2014, Hewer co-presented a BBC One documentary series with Margaret Mountford called Nick and Margaret: Too many Immigrants?, which researched the impact of and attitudes towards immigrants in the UK.

In 2015, Hewer presented a BBC Two programme called Nick and Margaret: The Trouble with our Trains with Mountford, in which they explore all the problems and insights of Britain's Railways.

Hewer has appeared on the panel shows Would I Lie to You? (2011), Ask Rhod Gilbert (2011), Have I Got News for You (2011, 2012, 2014, 2016), Room 101 (2012) and Big Star's Little Star (2015).

In December 2015, he appeared, with Mountford, in BBC's Celebrity Antiques Road Trip.

Hewer was also a contestant in The Great British Bake Off for Stand Up to Cancer in 2018 in series 1, episode 2.

In 2022, Hewer and a group of six other celebrity contestants took part in BBC series Pilgrimage.

On 15 April 2023, Hewer appeared on a celebrity edition of The Weakest Link where he was voted off in the first round.

== Personal life ==
Hewer married Margo Spindler in 1973; they had two children and in 1985 were divorced. His son, James, briefly acted as co-director of his father's company.

Hewer has been a patron of the charity Pancreatic Cancer Action since 2015 and in 2017 presented the charity's BBC Radio 4 charity appeal during Pancreatic Cancer Awareness Month.

In July 2008, he took part in the charity driving event, the Mongol Rally, in a Renault 4, driving from London to Ulaanbaatar. He raised over £12,000 for Hope and Homes for Children. He wrote a series of blogs about his journey for the online travel section of The Daily Telegraph.

For many years, Hewer was a supporter of the Labour Party. While appearing on Question Time in 2017, he said that he had supported the party since Harold Wilson, but was critical of the leaderships of Jeremy Corbyn and Ed Miliband. In January 2019, he said that he would no longer vote for Labour, after his Countdown co-presenter Rachel Riley received abuse on social media for speaking out against anti-Semitism within the party.

On 2 November 2012, Hewer received an honorary Doctor of Letters degree from Kingston University in recognition of his "outstanding contribution to business and entrepreneurship".

On 1 April 2019, he became the President of the Royal College of Speech and Language Therapists.

Hewer has a collection of hats that represent the national dress of various countries he has visited. His collection includes the hat of a Kazakhstan border guard, which he acquired under mysterious circumstances.

== See also ==
- Karren Brady
- Claude Littner
