= EVoice =

eVoice
- Type: Subsidiary
- Industry: Business Services
- Founded: 1999; 27 years ago
- Founders: Wendell Brown, Mark Klein, Craig Taro Gold
- Headquarters: United States
- Parent: j2 Global, Inc.
- Website: www.evoice.com

eVoice is a telecommunications service owned by j2 Global, Inc. The company manages incoming and outgoing calls using virtual phone numbers. The service was initially founded by Wendell Brown, Mark Klein, and Craig Taro Gold in 2000 and re-launched in March 2010.

== Overview ==
As of 2020, eVoice provides toll-free and local phone numbers to subscribers in the United States and Canada. The phone number is chosen by the user from available numbers in selected area codes. Based on how the user then configures the service, the user can then answer calls placed to the eVoice number on devices/phones owned by the subscriber. Users must have an established phone service in the United States or Canada to answer incoming calls. The virtual phone number allows subscribers to remain accessible regardless of location.

A competitor to eVoice is Google Voice.

== History ==
eVoice was founded in 2000 by Wendell Brown, Mark Klein, and Craig Taro Gold. Based at that time in Menlo Park, CA., eVoice was the world's first large-scale, Internet-enabled voicemail system. eVoice supplied voicemail solutions to MCI and AT&T, as well as web portals and VoIP providers including Qwest, Snowball, and Dialpad.

eVoice was acquired by AOL Time-Warner in July 2008 and merged into AOLbyPhone. Before the acquisition, eVoice raised more than $50 million in funding from idealab!, BlueRun Ventures (formerly Nokia Ventures), Oak Investment Partners, and Worldview Technology Partners.

In June 2004, the eVoice brand name and internet domain were acquired by j2 Global (NASDAQ:JCOM). j2 Global, Inc. is a cloud services company that offers voice, email, online fax, and online backup services.

eVoice's Australian division was first established in Australia and New Zealand in 1995 as Zintel Communications, which was acquired by eVoice in 2012.

== Technology ==
- Access to local and toll free numbers in the United States and Canada.
- Multiple extensions (quantity limited), enabling dialing to specific employees or departments.
- Call routing to desired phone(s); forwarding to multiple phones simultaneously or in a specific order.
- Call screening. Announcement of caller name; calls can then be picked up or transferred to voicemail.
- Voicemail sent directly to email; management through a computer with a standard web browser.
- Text transcriptions of voicemail messages, delivered as a text message or email.
- Conference call capability.
- Professional recorded greeting.
- Call transferring to voicemail, extensions, or another number.
- Mobile applications via iPhone, Android, or BlackBerry mobile devices.
- 24/7 live customer service and support; email support.
