= Livedrive =

- Release: December 2008
- Operating system: Microsoft Windows 7 and later Mac OS 10.11 and later iOS 11 and later Android 7.0 and later
- Available in: English
- Type: Online backup service, online file synchronization and storage service
- Website: www.livedrive.com

Livedrive is an online cloud backup and sync storage service owned by j2 Global. The company provides users with unlimited backup space and 2,000 GB or more of sync storage. Livedrive enables users to access their data from mobile phones and tablets. Currently Livedrive has apps for iOS, Android, Windows, macOS and ChromeOS.

== History ==
Livedrive was founded in late 2008 by Andrew Michael. Another investor in the company was Nicholas Cowell.

In October 2009 Livedrive entered into the US marketplace via a distribution agreement with Lifeboat Distribution - an international speciality software distribution for security, application lifecycle, and virtualization and network infrastructure products.

In April 2011, Livedrive created an April Fools' video which falsely stated that the company was storing files on paper using QR codes. The story was picked up by several press sources as a true story, including CBS's Money Watch.

On February 10, 2014, Livedrive was purchased by j2 Global. Livedrive is part of j2's Business Cloud Services division, which includes eFax, eVoice, Fusemail, Campaigner, and KeepITsafe.

After shutting down hundreds of user accounts for “excessive bandwidth/storage”, Livedrive was reported in August 2014 to be facing legal action from discontented customers.

== Media streaming ==
In September 2010, Livedrive added personal music and movie streaming to their accounts. This gave users the ability to listen to their own music collections or watch their movies on a remote computer, with transcoding handled by Livedrive. The company also gave users FTP access and unlimited versioning.
