= VIPRE =

American cybersecurity company

VIPRE Security Group Inc.
- Type: Private
- Industry: Computer security & Network Security
- Founded: 2013; 13 years ago
- Headquarters: Seattle, United States
- Number of locations: Clearwater, Copenhagen, Dublin, Stoke-on-Trent, Stockholm
- Key people: Nate Simmons (president); Usman Choudhary (CPO); Paul Apostolescu (CTO)
- Products: Email Security; Email Encryption; Endpoint Security; Security Awareness Training; SafeSend
- Brands: VIPRE, SendInc, LOGIVA, Inspired eLearning, IPVanish, StrongVPN, livedrive, SugarSync
- Revenue: ▲US$678.5 million (2020)
- Number of employees: ~500 (December 2020)
- Parent: Ziff Davis
- Website: www.vipre.com

VIPRE Security Group, (also known as VIPRE or VIPRE Security) a brand of Ziff Davis, is a privately held cybersecurity company headquartered in New York.

VIPRE develops cybersecurity products focused on endpoint and email security along with advanced threat intelligence applications. VIPRE is based globally with operations in Clearwater, Florida, Washington D.C., Vancouver B.C., Keele, United Kingdom, Dublin, Ireland, Copenhagen, Denmark, Stockholm, Sweden, Amsterdam, Netherlands and in Oslo, Norway.

== Corporate history ==
The company was originally founded in 1994 as Sunbelt Software, which was acquired in 2010 by GFI Software.

In 2013 Sunbelt Software was spun off and renamed to ThreatTrack Security.

In 2017 they were concentrating on their VIPRE suite and the company now uses that name. The VIPRE portfolio now encompasses endpoint security, with heritage from original Sunbelt Software anti-virus products, email security, with heritage from the UK company Fusemail, Comendo, StaySecure, WeCloud, iCritical and ElectricMail products that had previously been acquired by j2, and security awareness training via the acquisition of Inspired e-Learning.

VIPRE was featured in a PC World Magazine article.

In February 2018 it was acquired by j2 Global.

== Acquisitions ==
Announcement date	Company	Business	Deal size	Location	References
January 11, 2021	LOGIVA A/S	Email Encryption	Undisclosed	Aarhus, Denmark	
January 11, 2021	Inspired eLearning Inc.	Security Awareness Training	Undisclosed	Austin, TX	
May 10, 2019	SafeSend AS	Email DLP	Undisclosed	Oslo, Norway	
