= Highwinds Network Group =

Content delivery company

- Company type: Private
- Industry: Internet
- Founded: 2002; 24 years ago
- Headquarters: Winter Park, United States
- Key people: Steve Miller, Lance Crosby
- Website: highwinds.com

Highwinds Network Group, Inc. (Highwinds) was a company founded in 2002 that offered IP services including content delivery network (CDN), cloud storage, IP transit, transport and colocation. The company headquarters were located in Winter Park, Florida, United States. Highwinds maintained Network Operations Centers (NOCs) in Winter Park, FL, Phoenix, AZ, and Amsterdam, Netherlands as well as offices in Costa Mesa, CA, São Paulo, Brazil and London, England. The Highwinds network, called RollingThunder, consisted of more than 70 points of presence throughout North America, South America, Europe, Asia and Australia. Highwinds provided video streaming services to media companies including Blip.TV and Hudl, delivered online games for publishers such as Valve and CCP Games and distributed advertising assets for leading platforms including Facebook's LiveRail.

== Financing announcements ==
On March 11, 2008, Highwinds announced it had closed a $55 million round of equity financing led by General Catalyst Partners and Alta Communications. The funds will be used to expand the Highwinds CDN and RollingThunder network.

On May 4, 2011, Highwinds announced that it had secured a $50 million credit facility with Silicon Valley Bank and Comerica Bank. According to the press release from the company, the new credit facility allowed Highwinds to achieve a more attractive all-in cost of capital and was evidence of the company's impressive financial profile.

On August 8, 2013, Highwinds announced that it had secured $205 million in new financing. The transaction was led by Cerberus Business Finance, LLC and Goldman Sachs BDC, Inc., an investment fund managed by Goldman Sachs Asset Management, L.P., with participation from the company's existing equity sponsor, General Catalyst Partners, and the company's management team. The funding positioned Highwinds for massive growth of its global CDN.

On February 4, 2017, Highwinds was acquired by StackPath, an edge computing company. Financial details of the transaction were not disclosed. As quoted in their blog, "Highwinds' services and platform will be integrated with existing StackPath offerings and operations to create a single global platform with the industry's best security features and performance."

Omicron Media, the former owner of Highwinds, maintained ownership over the Usenet portion of Highwinds and maintains their operations under the name HW Media.
