= J2 Global =

American technology holding company

J2 Global, Inc.
- Type: Public
- Traded as: Nasdaq: JCOM
- Industry: Digital Media; Cloud Computing
- Founded: December 1995; 30 years ago (as JFax)
- Founder: Jaye Muller; Jack Rieley
- Successor: Ziff Davis, Inc.; Consensus Cloud Solutions
- Headquarters: Los Angeles, California, U.S.
- Area served: United States (holding); Worldwide (subsidiaries)
- Key people: Richard Ressler (chairman); Vivek Shah (CEO); Scott Turicchi (president & CFO); Nate Simmons (president, Cloud Services); Steve Horowitz (president, Ziff Davis); Dan Stone (president, Everyday Health Group)
- Services: eFax eVoice; Onebox; KeepItSafe; FuseMail; Campaigner; VIPRE; Livedrive; SMTP; SugarSync; Speedtest
- Revenue: ▲US$1.372 billion (2019)
- Operating income: ▲US$277.08 million (2019)
- Net income: ▲US$218.81 million (2019)
- Total assets: ▲US$3.505 billion (2019)
- Total equity: ▲US$1.311 billion (2019)
- Number of employees: over 4,000 (2020)
- Divisions: Business Cloud Services
- Subsidiaries: Excel Micro; Salesify; SMTP; VIPRE; IPVanish; StrongVPN
- Website: j2global.com

J2 Global, Inc. was an American technology holding company based in Los Angeles, California. The company provided Internet services through two divisions: Business Cloud Services and Digital Media.

== History ==
J2 Global was founded in December 1995 as JFax.com by Jaye Muller and Jack Rieley. The company changed its registered name to J2 Global Communications, Inc. in August 2000, and again to J2 Global on December 7, 2011, dropping "Communications" from its official name to reflect "…expansion from phone-number-centric services…into complementary lines of non-phone-number-centric services."

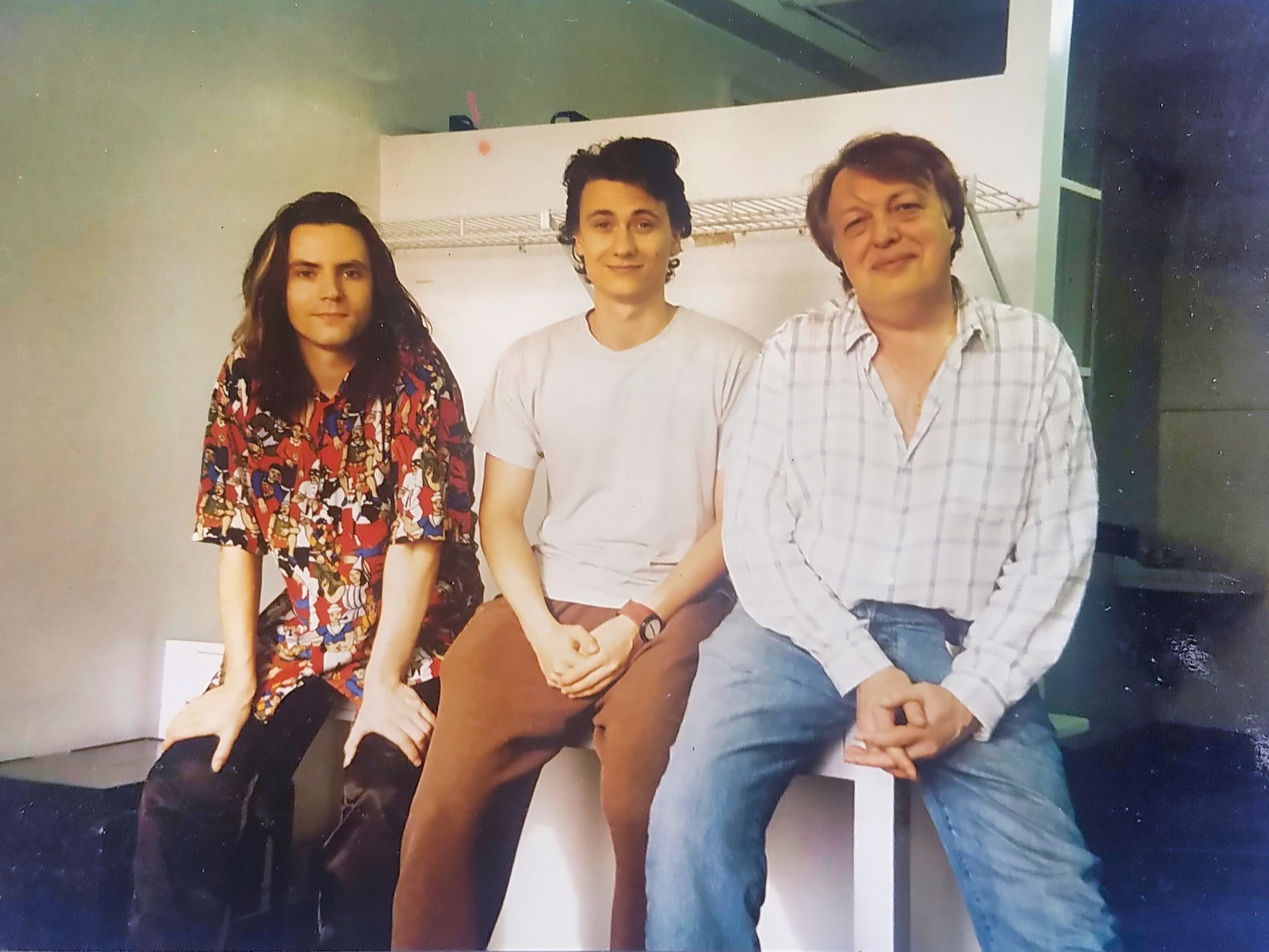
The founders of JFAX, Jaye Muller (l) and Jack Rieley (r) with Muller's brother Kai in the middle in their first office on Lafayette Street in New York in 1996

On November 12, 2012, J2 Global launched its digital media division with the acquisition of digital publisher Ziff Davis for $167 million in cash. On February 4, 2013, J2 Global acquired IGN Entertainment from News Corporation. Terms of the IGN acquisition were not publicized.

On March 18, 2013, the company announced it had acquired MetroFax, a Bellevue, Washington, provider of Internet faxing services. On April 17, 2013, the company acquired Backup Connect BV, a Dutch provider of online backup services. On 19 November 2013, its media division Ziff Davis announced it acquired electronics aggregating website TechBargain.com.

In February 2014, J2 Global announced the acquisition of several companies: City Numbers, a UK-based worldwide provider of inbound toll-free numbers in over 80 countries; Livedrive, a UK-based provider of online backup; and Australian companies OzeFax and Faxmate. On 3 April 2014 J2 Global announced that it acquired Business Critical Software (also known as iCritical), a UK-based email security and management company. In July 2019, J2 Global acquired the SaferVPN brand, bringing its total number of consumer VPN services to five.

In April 2021, J2 Global announced its intent to spin off part of its cloud services business as a new publicly traded company known as Consensus, with the remainder of the company (consisting primarily of its media assets) being retained under the J2 Global name. It was later announced that J2 Global would be renamed Ziff Davis Inc. upon its completion of the spin-off: the transaction was approved by J2 Global's board in September 2021.

== Brands and subsidiaries ==
The company operates two divisions; the "Business Cloud Services" division includes firms such as eFax, Onebox, eVoice, VIPRE, FuseMail, Campaigner, KeepItSafe, VaultLogix, Callstream, Yotta280, Mailout Interactive, GDV, BackUp Solutions, SugarSync, Nuvotera, UnityFax, Firstway Digital, Excel Micro, Web24 Group, MXSweep, City Numbers, IPVanish, Livedrive, Moz, MetroFax, FoneBox, TrustFax, RapidFax, Send2Fax, SFax, SRFax, and Fax.com. The company's digital media division, Ziff Davis, includes brands such as Mashable, PCMag, IGN and Everyday Health.

=== MyFax ===
MyFax is an Internet business communication tool launched by the Ottawa-based software company Protus IP Solutions in 2009.

An alternative to fax machines, it enables users to send and receive faxes from any location through the internet, as well as directly from Microsoft Office, Microsoft Outlook, and Microsoft Windows-based applications including Google Docs, OpenOffice.org, and Intuit QuickBooks. A program was released that allows for iPhone and BlackBerry applications to be fully compatible with smartphones.

Before its acquisition by J2 Global, MyFax had received a few favorable reviews including an Internet Telephony magazine product of the year for 2009.

On December 6, 2010, MyFax announced that it had been acquired by J2 Global Communications, Inc., owners of eFax, which subsequently imposed restrictive terms and conditions on the client's right to local number portability. Among the restrictions is a $40 US charge per number if J2 permits the number to be ported out; the company imposes many arbitrary restrictions on portability and has attempted to claim the numbers as its own property, in some cases imposing inflated penalties and unilaterally taking numbers back after they've been ported to another provider by clients.

=== StrongVPN ===
StrongVPN is a commercial VPN service owned by J2 Global. It was founded in 2005, and is one of the oldest VPN services. It supports various protocols, including IPsec, OpenVPN and WireGuard. It was acquired by J2 Global in 2019 from its former owner StackPath.

ZDNet described StrongVPN as "a clear and easy-to-use VPN ideal for coffee shop use". Meanwhile, Tom's Hardware considered it strong and simple but noted the lack of information on its no-log policy. PC World considered it "a good VPN for most people".

StrongVPN has not directly answered questions about logging, but they are able to match an IP address to a customer.

== Awards ==
- 2012, InformationWeek 500 list of technology companies.
- 2013, ranked number 39 in Forbes' list of "America's Best Small Companies".

== Litigation ==
J2 Global has filed patent litigation cases against several companies, including CallWave, Comodo, EasyLink Services International Corporation, OpenText, Packetel, Protus, Venali and Zayo Group. Some of the companies filed counterclaims, some of which alleged antitrust violations of Section 2 of the Sherman Act and California's Business and Professions Code §§ 16720 and 17200.
