= United Internet =

German internet services company

United Internet AG
- Type: Aktiengesellschaft
- Traded as: FWB: UTDI; MDAX Component
- ISIN: DE0005089031
- Industry: Telecommunications
- Predecessor: 1&1 EDV-Marketing GmbH
- Founded: 1988; 38 years ago
- Headquarters: Montabaur, Rhineland-Palatinate, Germany
- Area served: Europe
- Key people: Ralph Dommermuth (CEO), Carsten Theurer (CFO), Philipp von Bismarck (Chairman of the supervisory board)
- Services: ISP, web hosting, cloud services, webmail
- Revenue: €6.1 billion (2025)
- Number of employees: 10,547 (2025)
- Website: www.united-internet.com

United Internet AG is a global Internet services company headquartered in Montabaur, Rhineland-Palatinate, Germany. The company is structured in two business areas, Access and Applications, and has a total of 16 brands and numerous subsidiaries. The well-known brands under the umbrella of United Internet AG include 1&1, Ionos, Strato, Fasthosts, GMX, WEB.DE and 1&1 Versatel.

United Internet AG is listed in MDAX, TecDAX – going public in 1998 (under the name 1&1 Internet AG &Co. KGaA).

United Internet comprises over 27 million customer accounts and runs business in over 30 locations across the world.

== History ==
The history of the Group goes back to 1&1 EDV-Marketing GmbH, which was founded in 1988 by Ralph Dommermuth and Wendelin Abresch as a service provider for marketing and advertising. In the 1990s, the company grew into a large corporation that offered web hosting packages as well as its own online service that allowed users to dial up to the Internet.

In March 1998, the company went public under the name 1&1 Internet AG & Co. KGaA. It later becomes United Internet AG, under whose umbrella the 1&1 brand stands for Internet access products. Ordinary shares with a notional share of capital stock of one euro each were used. United Internet's IPO took place before the peak of the New Economy, but the share reached a closing price of over 200 percent of the issue price on the first day of trading.

Between 2000 and 2003, the subsidiary 1&1 entered various foreign markets, including the UK, France and the USA. In May 2005, United Internet acquired the portal and e-mail business of WEB.DE, which was merged with its in-house offering GMX to form 1&1 Mail & Media GmbH.

In December 2008, it was announced that the company would take over united-domains AG, based in Starnberg, Germany, for around €34 million.

In May 2009, United Internet announced the acquisition of the DSL business of Freenet AG. As a result, the company's DSL customers – most recently around 700,000 – were transferred to United Internet for a total of 123 million euros.

The AdLink Group has no longer belonged to United Internet since July 2009; it was sold to the French group Hi-Media.

On 3 September 2014 United Internet announced that the remaining 74.9% of shares in the fixed-line and fiber-optic network operator Versatel GmbH would be taken over from KKR. Shortly afterwards, the company was renamed 1&1 Versatel. Today, 1&1 Versatel has its own fiber optic network with a total length of over 67,000 kilometers in Germany and is represented in over 350 cities. As of December 2025, 1&1 Versatel became part of 1&1 AG following an internal restructuring.

On 10 July 2015 the acquisition of the Polish web host home.pl for around 135 million euros was announced.

On 15 December 2016 United Internet announced its intention to acquire Strato for around EUR 600 million; the purchase was completed on 1 April 2017. In 2016, 1&1 Internet SE also split into two business divisions: 1&1 Telecommunications SE and the Business Applications division with the IONOS brand. IONOS went public on the Frankfurt Stock Exchange in February 2023.

In 2017, 1&1 Telecommunication SE and Drillisch AG merged to form 1&1 AG. In 2019, 1&1 AG successfully participated in the 5G frequency auction and is building the first fully virtualized mobile network in Europe based on Open RAN technology. By December 2025, the 1&1 mobile network reached 25 percent of German households.

United Internet AG now has around 10,500 employees and posted sales of €6.1 billion in fiscal year 2025.

Founder Ralph Dommermuth holds over 50 percent of the shares in United Internet AG.

== Subsidiaries ==
United Internet is the parent company of three major webmail providers: GMX Mail and Web.de, which are predominantly European providers, and Mail.com whose users are mainly from the US and the UK. It also owns Ionos and Fasthosts, both domain registrars and web hosting providers. Furthermore it owns 1&1 which runs a DSL and mobile network business in Germany. 1&1 Versatel (deWP: 1&1 Versatel) runs a B2B access business and owns a 52,000 kilometer optical fiber network.
