= Amstrad PPC =

Portable IBM PC compatible computers

Amstrad PPC512/PPC640

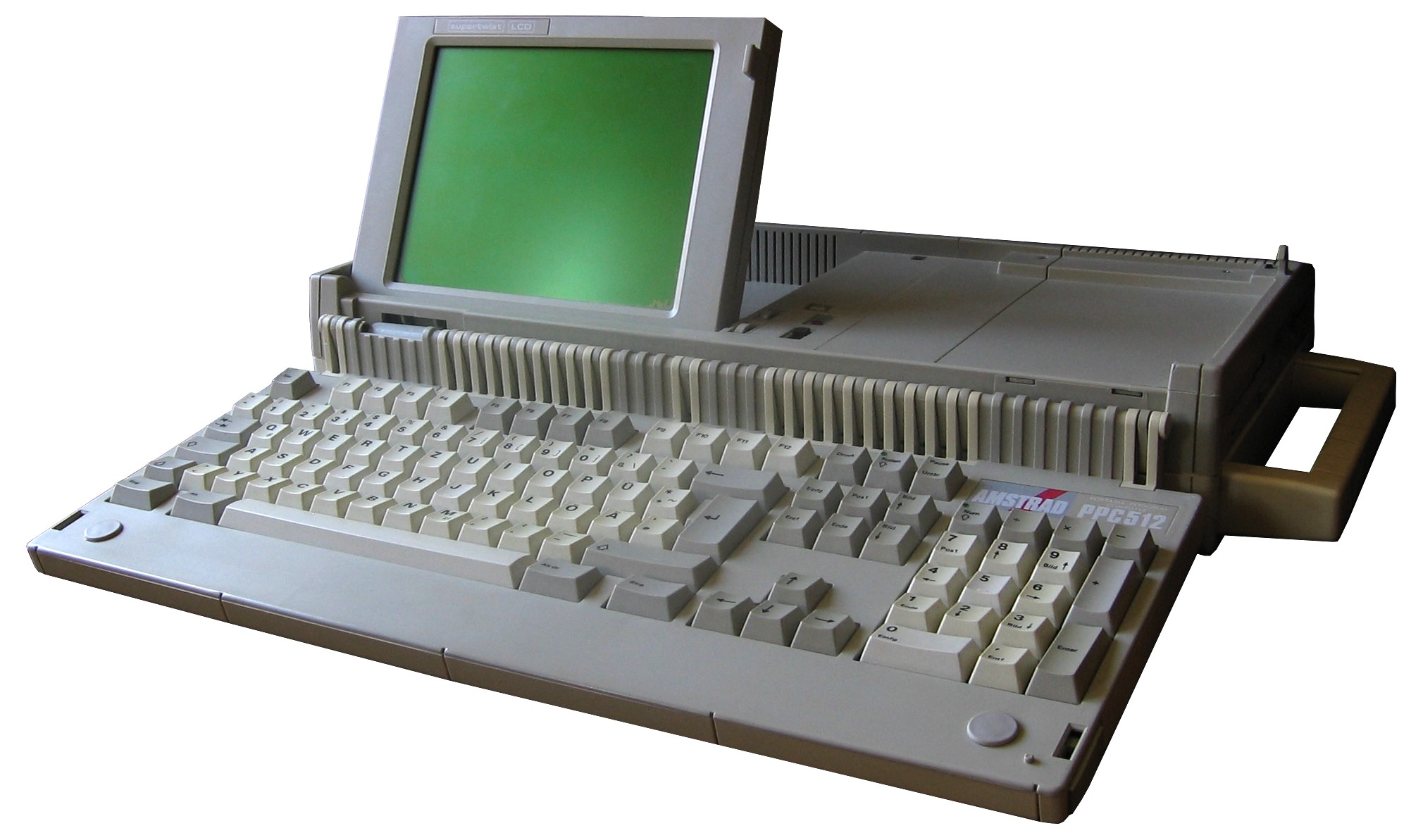
- Amstrad PPC512
- Manufacturer: Amstrad
- Type: Portable computer
- Released: 1987; 39 years ago
- Introductory price: US$1,099 (equivalent to $3,114 in 2025)
- Operating system: MS-DOS 3.3
- CPU: NEC V30 @ 8 MHz
- Memory: 512KB (PPC512); 640KB (PPC640)
- Storage: 3.5-inch floppy disk drives
- Display: Monochrome non-backlit LCD; 640 × 200 resolution
- Graphics: Monochrome Display Adapter, CGA
- Sound: PC Speaker
- Input: 102-key keyboard with numpad and function keys
- Connectivity: RS-232, Centronics, 2400 baud modem (PPC640)
- Dimensions: 4 × 17,5 × 9 inches
- Weight: 12 lb (5.4 kg)
- Backward compatibility: IBM PC compatible
- Predecessor: PC-1512

The Amstrad PPC512 and Amstrad PPC640 were the first portable IBM PC compatible computers made by Amstrad. Released in 1987, they were a development of the desktop PC-1512 and PC-1640 models.

As portable computers, they contained all the elements necessary to perform computing on the move. They had a keyboard and a monochrome LCD built in and also had space for disposable batteries to power the PC where a suitable alternative power source (i.e. mains or 12-volt vehicle power) was not available. The PCs came with either one or two double-density double-side floppy disc drives and the PPC640 model also featured a modem.

Both models were supplied with PPC Organiser software and the PPC640 was additionally supplied with the Mirror II communications software.

== Hardware ==
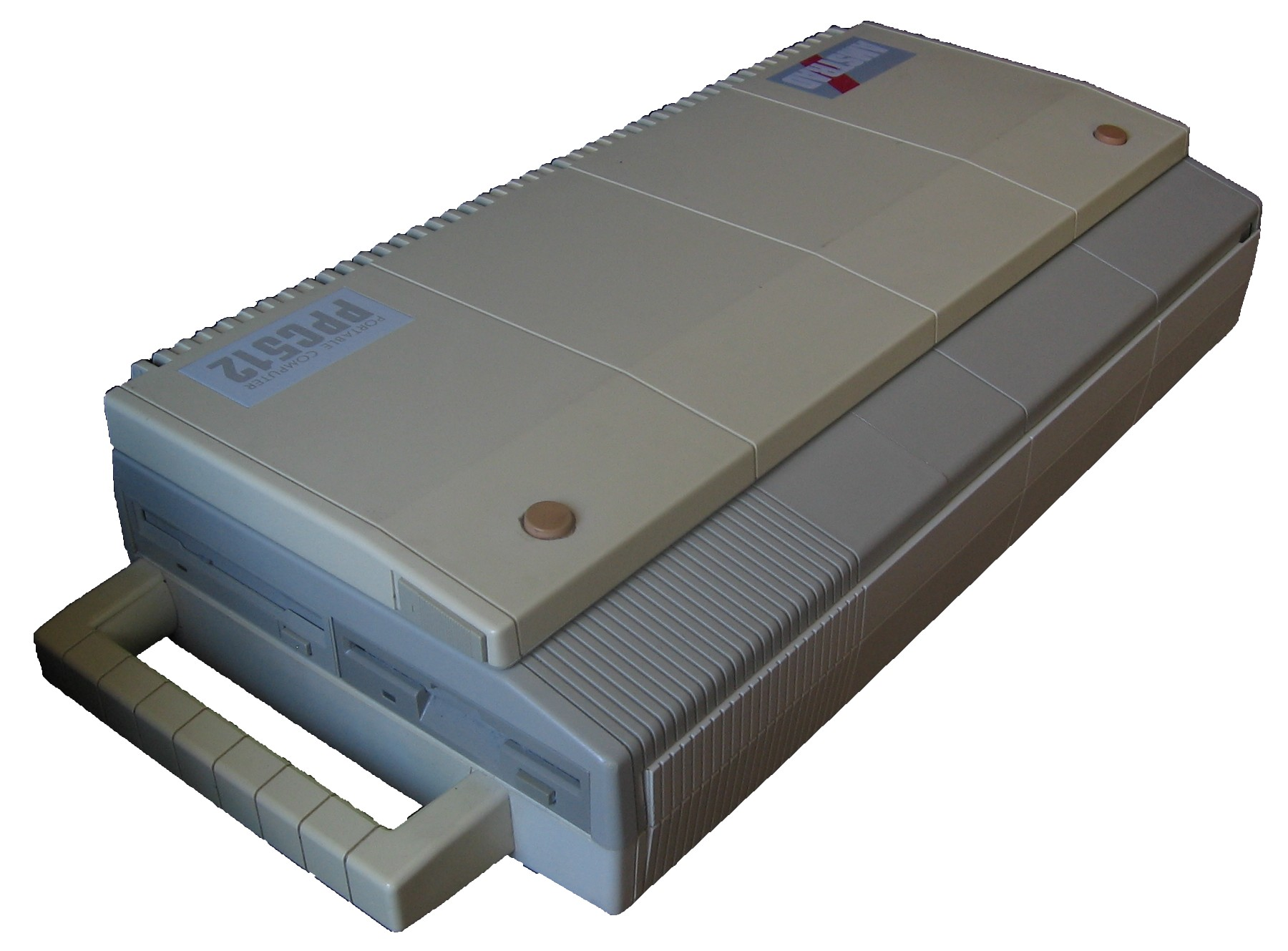
Amstrad PPC512, closed

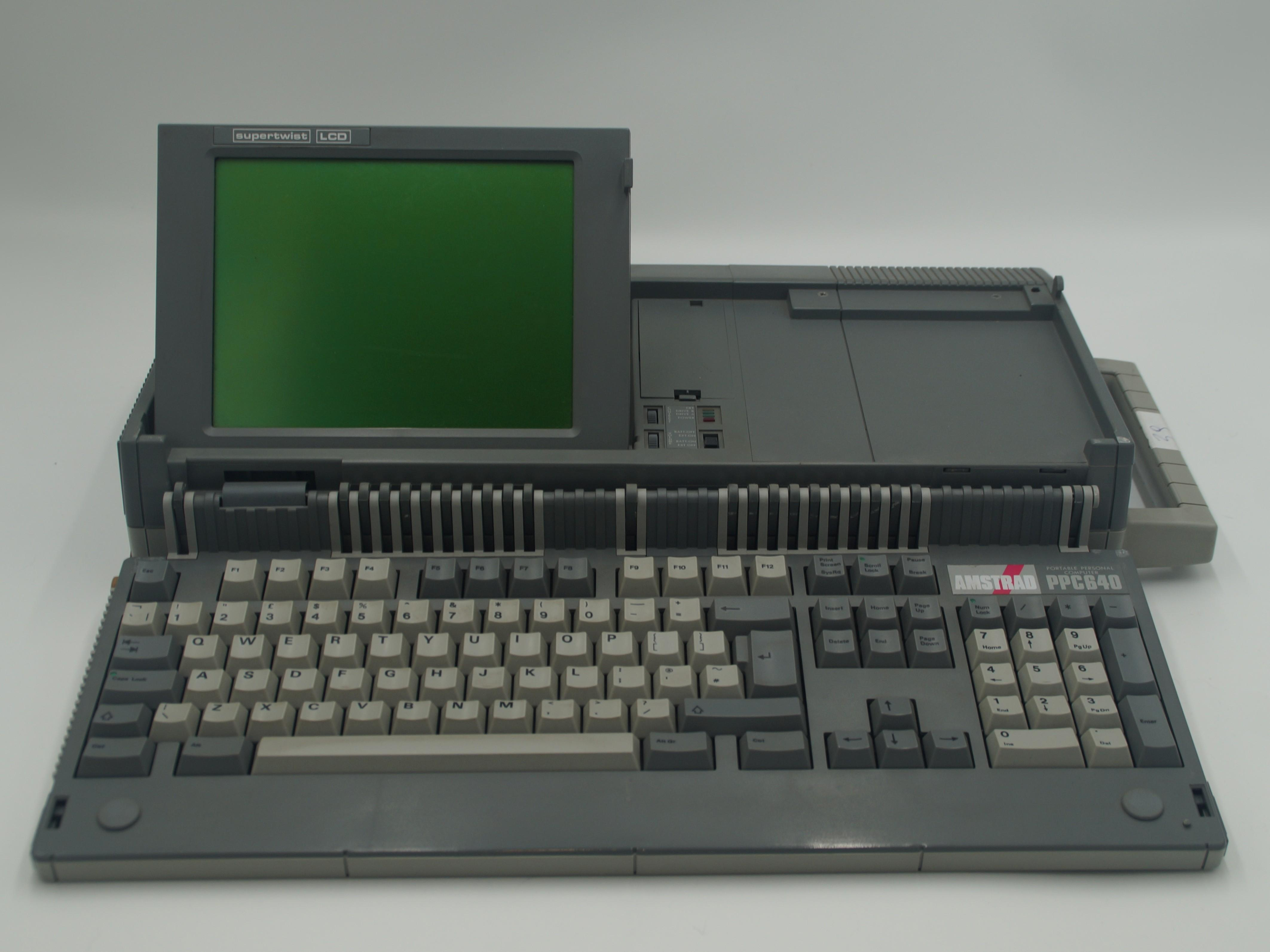
Amstrad PPC640

The two computers had very similar specifications. The PPC512 had an NEC V30 processor running at 8 MHz, 512 KiB of memory, a full-size 102-key keyboard with a numeric keypad, a built-in liquid-crystal display (not backlit) that could emulate the CGA or MDA and either one or two 720k 3.5-inch floppy drives (the model was either the PPC512S or PPC512D depending on the number of drives it had).

The PPC640 was otherwise identical except that it had 640 KiB of memory, a built-in 2400 baud modem (unusually fast for its day), and its case was a darker shade of grey. Both versions of the machine had an empty socket on the main circuit board so that an Intel 8087 coprocessor could be installed to permit hardware processing of floating point arithmetic.

The PPC included standard connectors for RS-232, Centronics and CGA/MDA video, allowing existing peripherals to be used. All the signals used by the 8-bit ISA bus were also available through a pair of expansion connectors. There was available an external card cage for expansion cards.

Four possible power sources could be used:

- Ten C-size alkaline batteries. (10 × 1.5 V = 15 volts, but the load was such the voltage dropped to nearer 12 volts in use)
- Mains adaptor
- Car cigarette lighter
- An Amstrad PC-MD, PC-CD or PC-ECD monitor (These monitors all contained a power supply.)

The physical layout of the components was unlike most laptop designs: instead of the lid containing the screen, it contained the keyboard. The hinges were therefore at the front of the main unit, rather than the back. The LCD was hinged separately and folded down into a recess on the top of the system unit. The one or two floppy drives were located on the right-hand side. When closed, the size of the PPC was 45 cm wide × 10 cm high × 23 cm deep.

A bank of six DIP switches was used to select whether the video hardware emulated CGA or MDA, and whether to use an internal or external monitor.

No official hard drive option or docking station was manufactured, but both were sold by third-party manufacturers.

== Software ==
MS-DOS 3.3 was supplied with all PPCs, along with PPC Organiser – a memory-resident suite of utilities including a card file, diary, calculator and telephone dialler. In addition, the PPC640 was supplied with Mirror II, a communications package for use with the built-in modem.

The MS-DOS boot disk also included a utility which could be used to switch between the internal display and an external monitor without rebooting.

== Amstrad PC20 / Sinclair PC200 ==
In late 1988 Amstrad created a desktop computer based on the PPC design, intended for the home market. This machine was available in two versions, Sinclair PC200 and Amstrad PC20. The PC200 had a black case and 'Sinclair' branding, while the PC20 was white and branded 'Amstrad'.
