= PC-20 =

PC-20 or PC20 may refer to

- Amstrad PC20, a computer
- Penske PC-20, a car
- Commodore PC-20, a computer
