= Protext =

British word processing program

Protext is a British word processing program, developed by Arnor Ltd, of Peterborough in the decade following 1985. Originally written for the Amstrad CPC 464, it was later sold for the Amstrad PCW series of word processors, for MS-DOS based PCs, the Atari ST, and the Commodore Amiga.

A version was developed for the Acorn Archimedes and released in October 1990 which ran in full screen text mode, with Arnor indicating that "increased demand" had led to the product being released for the platform and that with "high enough" demand, the product would be upgraded to be "Risc OS compatible" (Note: Presumably, what was meant was "RISC OS compliant" in Acorn's own terminology, meaning desktop application.) and that other products would be released. The product was priced at £149.95. An accompanying note in the box mentioned Arnor's intention to develop a future release that would support operation in the RISC OS desktop with drag and drop capabilities, but this was never developed. According to a review of the software in early 1991, a multi-tasking version operating in a desktop window was being developed, but these plans were presumably abandoned due to a lack of market interest, with the review noting that the program's inability to multi-task "may deter many Arc users" who would already be accustomed to compliant desktop software. Being a "printer font only" program relieved the software of any reliance on the RISC OS printer drivers (which was also a characteristic of Acorn's First Word Plus product that had been introduced before RISC OS, although subsequently updated), and drivers were provided for a range of dot-matrix and inkjet printers, but PostScript support was absent. However, support for including graphics was rudimentary and no graphical previews of printed documents were possible. With Acorn's own product being somewhat cheaper and with other competitors becoming established, Protext was considered to do "what it aims to do extremely well" at a price, with the suggestion made that potential purchasers might have wanted to wait for a multi-tasking version. Expectations persisted of a desktop version during 1991.

In 1991 Arnor were commissioned by Amstrad to develop a special version of Protext for the NC100 portable computer. This was included in the ROM on the NC100, NC150 and NC200. Translated versions of Protext were published in German, French and Swedish. The German version was known as Prowort due to a name conflict.

After the closure of Arnor in 1995, the program was taken over by a group of enthusiasts including the original authors: Mark Tilley and Gavin Every; and relaunched with a new version for the PC. A companion database program Prodata was also sold. Since December 2008, Protext together with manuals and technical information has been freely downloadable, in formats for PC, Commodore Amiga and Atari ST.

Protext was designed for speed and flexibility and features the usual word processing features, such as a spell checker, thesaurus, auto-correction and good printer support. While later releases supported use of a mouse, the fastest editing with Protext would be using the keyboard, with all commonly used editing commands available with control key combinations.

An unusual feature of Protext is its programmability. A mail merge programming language allows the user to input data from a text file or Prodata database. This is achieved by 'Stored commands' within the body of the text, an idea borrowed from the 'dot commands' of WordStar. Stored commands are similarly used to control formatting and layout of the text for printing. A preview mode showed the formatted layout but Protext did not display the fonts on screen.

The macro record facility allowed a series of keystrokes to be 'learnt' and assigned to a single key or stored as an 'exec' file. For programmers, a useful feature is the easy manipulation of characters outside the alphanumeric range, in search strings or macros.

Protext may be used to write a webpage, generate a webpage from stored data, or to create text for export and final formatting to a WYSIWYG word processor or DTP desktop publishing programme.
