= PC-200 =

PC-200 or PC200 may refer to

- Komatsu PC200, a series of excavators by Komatsu Limited
- Sinclair PC200, a computer
