= Viglen =

Computer company of the United Kingdom

Viglen Ltd
- Type: Ltd
- Industry: Computing
- Founded: United Kingdom (1975)
- Defunct: November 23, 2021
- Headquarters: Hertfordshire
- Key people: Claude Littner, Chairman; Alan Sugar, Former Chairman and major shareholder

Viglen Ltd was a company that provided IT products and services, including storage systems, servers, workstations and data/voice communications equipment and services.

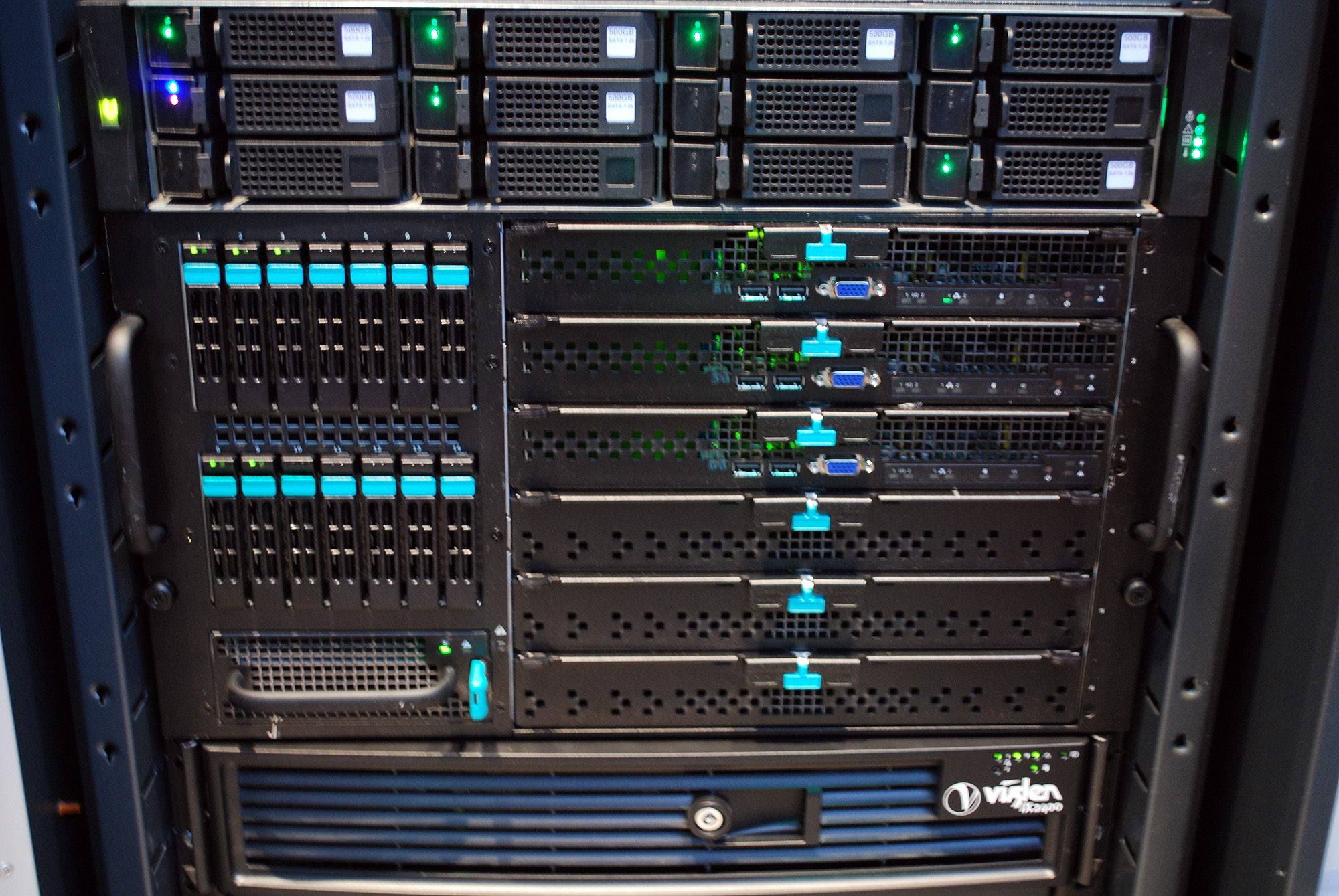
A Viglen IX9000 Modular Chassis

== History ==
The company was formed in 1975, by Vigen Boyadjian. During the 1980s, the company specialised in direct sales through multi page advertisements in leading computer magazines, catering particularly, but not exclusively, to owners of Acorn computers.

Viglen was acquired by Alan Sugar's company Amstrad in June 1994. It was listed as a public limited company in 1997, and Amstrad plc shares were split into Viglen and Betacom shares, Betacom being renamed to Amstrad PLC. Following the sale in July 2007 of Amstrad PLC to Rupert Murdoch's BSkyB, Viglen became Sugar's sole IT establishment.

In July 2009, Alan Sugar resigned as the chairman of Viglen (and most of his other companies), handing over the reins of the company to longtime associate, Claude Littner. In January 2014, Sugar sold his interest in Viglen to the Westcoast Group, which merged it with another of its subsidiaries, XMA.
