= Betacom =

Founded in 1969 by Dennis Baylin, Betacom was an electronics company specialising in audio and visual products. In 1992 Sir Alan Sugar's Amstrad purchased a 29.9% stake in the company from Canon Street Investments PLC. A rights issue and subscription increased Amstrad's shareholding in Betacom to 71.3%. Betacom, a UK-based domestic telephone supplier provided Amstrad with a foothold in the developing telecommunications market .

The following year, repayment and cancellation of share capital involving a scheme of arrangement, as a result of which Amstrad's shareholding in Betacom reduced to 66.2%.

In 1996, Amstrad granted Betacom a licence to use the Amstrad brand on consumer electronics products.

In 1997 Amstrad plc was de-listed from the stock exchange and each shareholder received loan notes, shares in Viglen Technology plc (a newly listed company), shares in Betacom plc and a letter of entitlement to the potential net proceeds arising from two court cases. In November of the same year, Betacom plc changed its name to Amstrad plc.

In 1999, Amstrad sold the Betacom business to Alba plc along with Answercall and Cable & Wireless branded telecommunications business for £4M in cash.
