= Amstrad NC100 =

Notebook computer

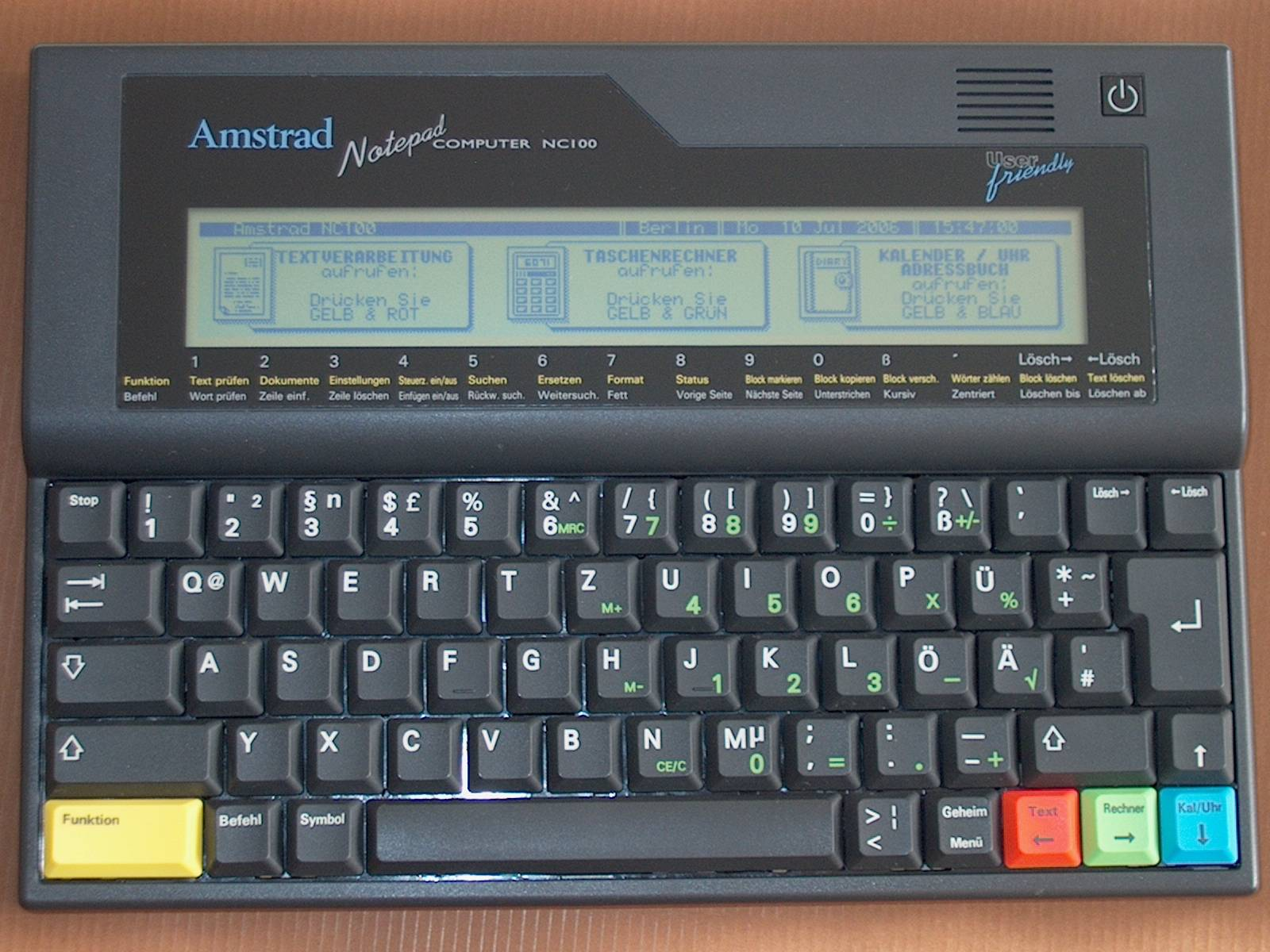
- A German Amstrad NC100
- Developer: Amstrad
- Type: Notebook computer
- Released: July 1992; 34 years ago
- CPU: Z80 at 4 MHz
- Memory: 64 KB RAM
- Storage: 256 KB ROM
- Display: LCD 80 columns by 8 rows
- Connectivity: RS-232 serial port, parallel port, PC card socket (Allowed expanding memory up to 1 MB)
- Power: four standard AA cell batteries

The Amstrad NC100 Notepad is an A4-size, portable Z80-based notebook computer, released by Amstrad in July 1992. It featured 64 KB of RAM, the Protext word processor, various organiser-like facilities (diary, address book and time manager), a simple calculator, and a version of the BBC BASIC interpreter.

The computer's design, evocative of the TRS-80 Model 100, features a screen with 80 character columns by eight rows, and not backlit, but this let the NC100 run for up to 20 hours on four standard AA cell batteries. There was an RS-232 serial port, a parallel port for connecting a printer, and a PC card socket, by means of which the computer's memory could be expanded up to 1 MB.

== Design ==
The NC100 was designed to be a portable computer which was simple to use. That was the brief given by Sir Alan Sugar (then chairman of Amstrad) to his design staff. The NC100 project was internally referred to as "Alan's Baby" and Sugar himself tested the machine for usability during the design phase. The specifications for the computer were not considered important - as long as it could serve its purpose.

The user-friendly features of the NC100 come from the software which is included in the firmware. Protext and the other applications were designed with a computer novice in mind - although experienced users can find and use a large array of more complicated features.

Sugar wrote the first chapter of the NC100's user manual in order to show that even he could use it.

The design also included terminal emulation and XMODEM file transfer software which enabled the NC100 to communicate through dial-up analogue modems. UK tech journalist Sue Schofield used one to upload a review of the NC100 directly into the online filing computer of the Independent newspaper in 1993. The review was written on the machine, and transferred from it over a battery-powered 300 baud modem.

== Upgrades ==
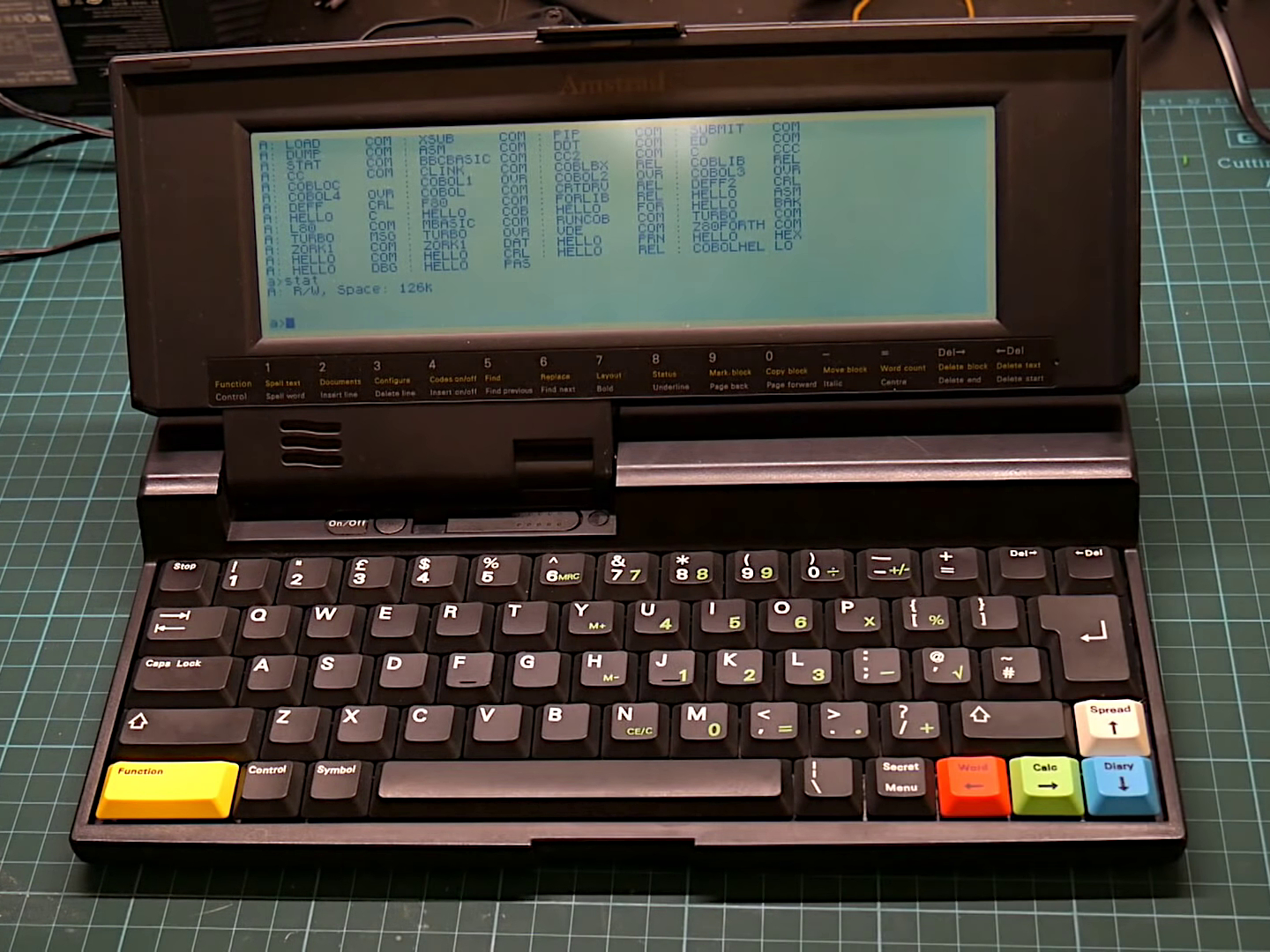
NC200 Notebook

An upgraded variant, the NC200 Notebook, appeared in late 1993. This came in a clamshell-type form factor with a flip-up screen featuring a backlit 80 x 16 character text screen and double the vertical pixel resolution as the NC100. The NC200 had a 720 KB 3.5" floppy disk drive able to read/write MS-DOS-formatted disks, 128 KB RAM, and some extra software - notably three Tetris-like games and a capable spreadsheet with rudimentary database capability. However, these changes required much greater power use, requiring 5 C cell batteries. The disk drive could only be used at near full-charge, which meant that it could only be used a few hours after putting in new batteries. The laptop could function for considerably longer without using the disk drive. The backlight can be manually toggled off to save power by pressing the Control and Caps Lock keys at the same time.

An intermediate version, the NC150 Notepad, was also produced, but was available only in Italy and France; its case had the same design as the NC100, but it included the games later seen on the NC200.

== Variants ==
Both the NC100 and NC200 were licensed to a company called NTS Computer Systems in British Columbia and marketed as the Dreamwriter 325 and Dreamwriter 200. Dreamwriter 325 had a newer ROM Version (1.06). The Dreamwriter 200 had a 1.44 MB floppy disk drive, an upgrade from the NC200's 720 KB drive. Its user guide cautions against using the low-density floppy disks. There were NTS Models, which had a similar Design but another CPU (NEC V20 instead Zilog Z80) and/or another set of applications in ROM.

The cases were off-white in color with blue and green stripes separating the screen from the keyboard. There were blue and green colored keys also. The Dreamwriters were retailed by Radio Shack in the U.S. for a short time in the mid-1990s.
