= Amstrad PC2286 =

Personal computer launched in 1989

- Manufacturer: Amstrad
- Type: Personal computer
- Released: 1989
- Introductory price: £999
- Media: 5.25 inch or 3.5 inch FDD
- Operating system: MS-DOS 4.01, Windows 2.1 and GW-BASIC
- CPU: Intel 80286 CPU @ 12.5 MHz
- Memory: 1 MB (expandable to 4 MB)
- Storage: 40 MB HDD;
- Display: 12" and 14" monitors
- Graphics: VGA
- Input: Serial, parallel, mouse
- Predecessor: PC1512/1640

The Amstrad PC2286 was launched 1989. It was part of the 2000 series, that consisted of three models: PC2086 (8086), PC2286 (80286) and PC2386 (80386DX).

The series launched as a professional follow on to the PC1512/1640, using a plastic case similar to previous models, but this time the main computer unit had its own power supply unit built in. The machine's BIOS setting were battery-backed, using four AA batteries mounted on top of the base unit.

The PC2286 came with 3.5" floppy drives as standard, with a side port enabling an external 5¼" disk drive to be connected. A range of monitors where available, with 12" and 14" screens both in monochrome and colour.

Due to a problem with the Seagate ST277R hard disk shipped with the PC2386 model, these had to be recalled and fitted with Western Digital controllers. Amstrad later successfully sued Seagate with a 1997 judgement in their favour. Due to bad press at the time, due to the hard disk problems, Amstrad lost its lead in the European PC market.

== Specifications ==
The differences across the range were mainly the CPU, memory and hard drive capacity.

- Processor:
  - PC2086: 8086 @ 8 MHz;
  - PC2286: 80286 @ 12.5 MHz;
  - PC2386: 80386 @ 20 MHz
- Memory:
  - PC2086: 640KB;
  - PC2286: 1 MB/4 MB RAM;
  - PC2386: 4 MB/16 MB
- Hard Disk:
  - PC2086: 30MB;
  - PC2286: 40 MB
- Graphics: VGA adapter supporting MDA, CGA, Hercules, EGA, MCGA and EVGA
- I/O: Serial, parallel, 5.25 inch or 3.5 inch FDD, mouse
- Operating system: MS-DOS 4.01, Microsoft Windows 2.1 and Microsoft GW-BASIC
