= Amstrad E-mailer =

Personal communication centre

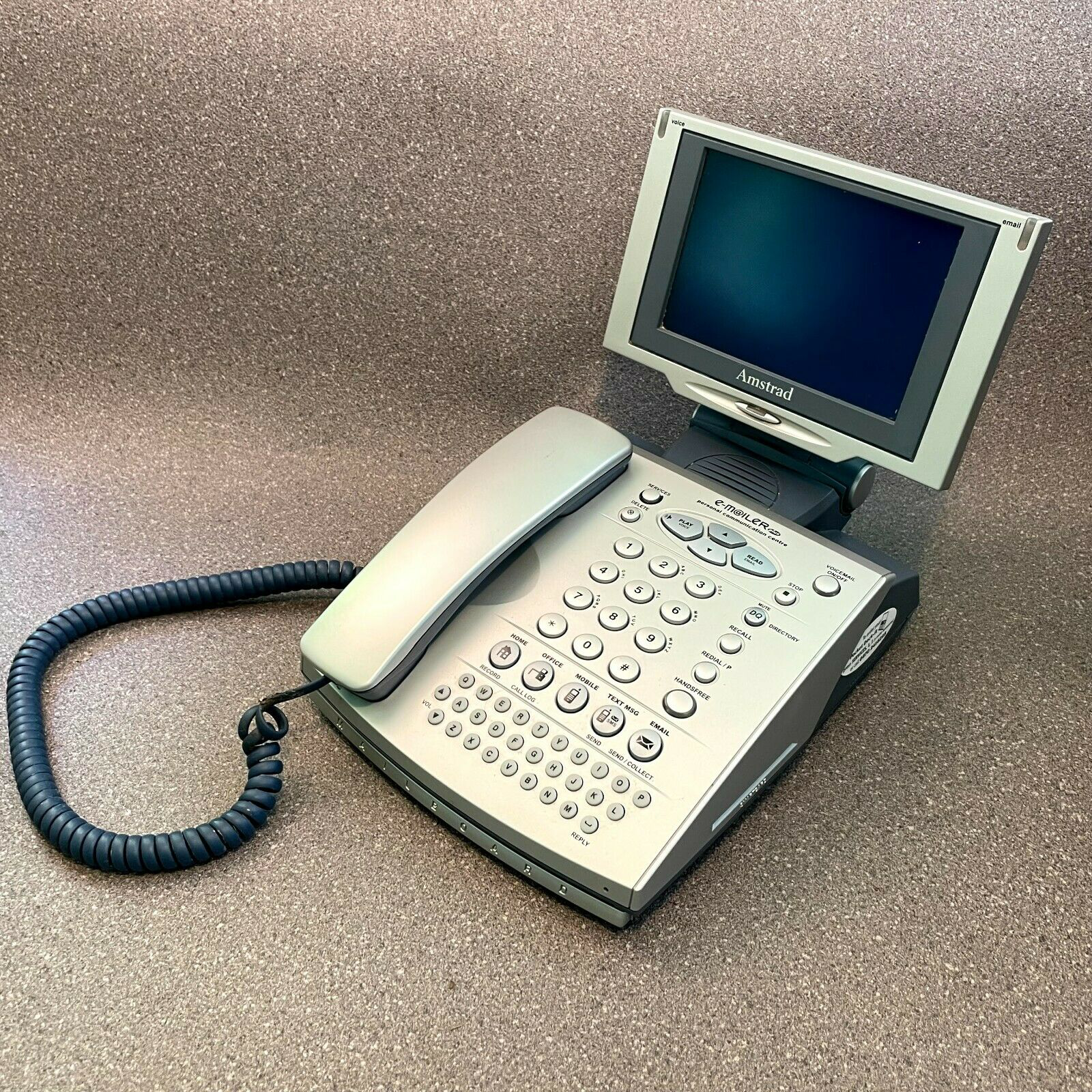
Amstrad E-mailer Plus

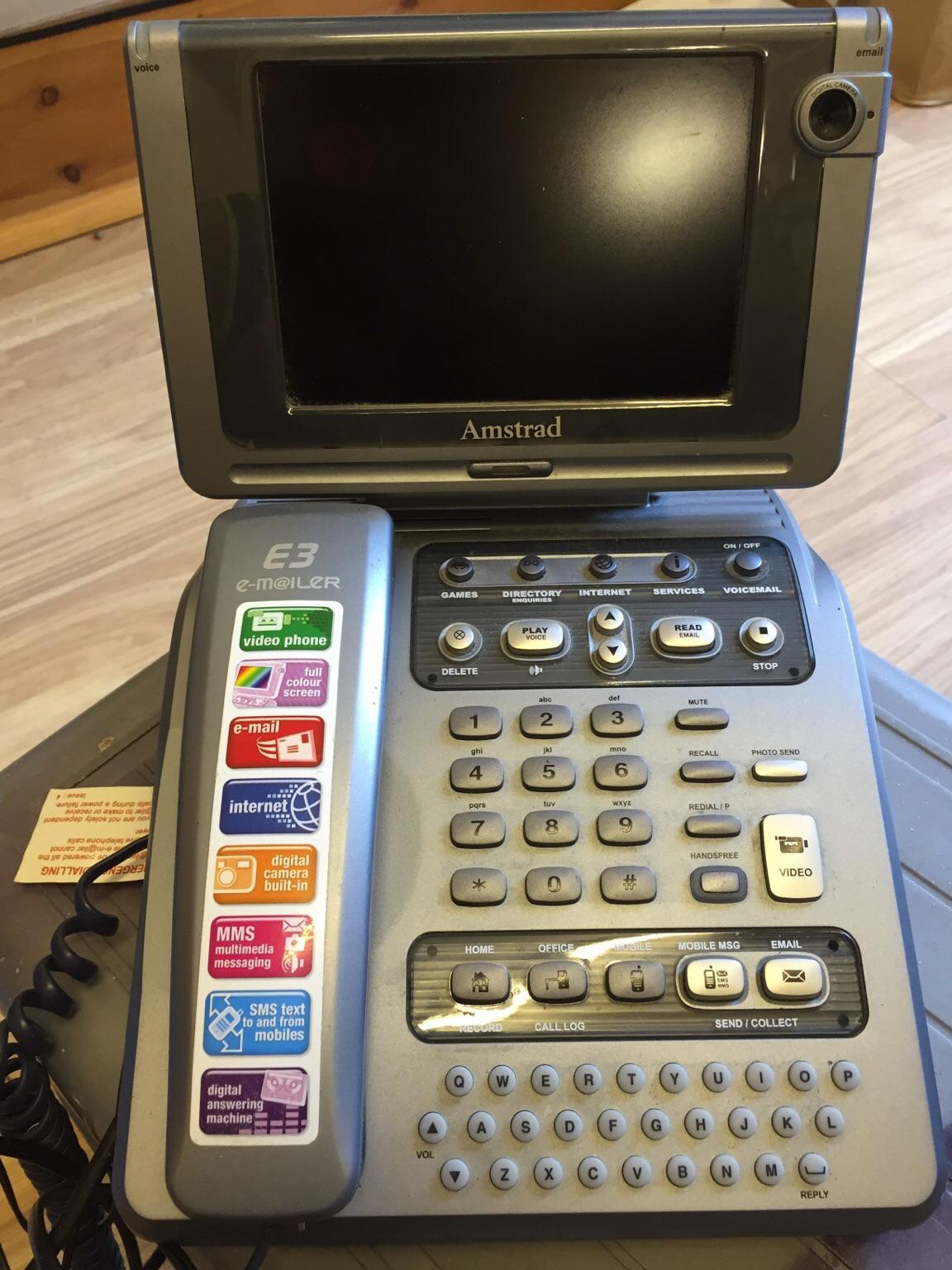
Amstrad E3 Videophone

The Amstrad E-mailer (stylised as e-m@iler in marketing materials and on the phone, or written as Emailer or Em@iler) is a personal communication centre that is a landline phone device, launched in March 2000.

The first model was known as the EM2000, this was followed in 2002 by the EM2002 plus model and then the final iteration was the E3 in 2004, known as the Emailer Videophone.

The Amserve email system was closed in June 2011 by Amstrad's owner Sky which left the e-mailer no longer functioning.

== History ==
=== Design and release ===
The first Amstrad E-mailer was a collaboration between Amstrad and BT, with Amstrad using the backend and email server provided by BT. BT released their own e-mail phone, the BT Easicom 1000, in 1998, 2 years before the Emailer's release. When the Amstrad E-mailer was released in March 2000, it had the "Powered by BT" logo printed on it. In February 2002 with the launch of the new e-mailer, Amstrad moved to their own Email/Internet service via Thus and broke ties with BT.

The bootloader was named "PBL", an abbreviation for "Primary Boot Loader", and was designed by Trevor Kellaway at Application Solutions for Amstrad.

=== Profitability ===
Amstrad made a loss on every E-Mailer sold. Amstrad recouped that loss through the phone calls made each day with a "pay-as-you-use" business model. It was only after they were used for 2 to 3 years that they started to make a profit. By October 2003, it was reported that there were 280,000 users, and Sugar said:

Yesterday I know 170,000 of them sent an e-mail, 6,000 had a surfing session, 341 bought some ring tones, 560 bought games.

Amstrad eventually broke even, as Lord Sugar said in an interview in 2011:

I think the mistake was that it was slightly too late – we're going back maybe ten years or more. The explosion of the broadband market meant the demise of that product. We sold 450,000 but we subsidised them because I wanted to get into a business where I was no longer on the treadmill of expecting to make a profit on hardware. There was a cost each time a person sent an email and that was where our revenues were coming from. But they are still out there – I think there are 150,000 people still using them and I think someone told me Amstrad now has broken even and we have actually recovered all the costs.

The unpopularity of the E-mailer led to losses at Amstrad's Amserve company. This was partially attributed to the fact that any time a customer checked their emails on the E-mailer, it would cost them 20p a time. In 2001, Watkins resigned after being with Amstrad for over 25 years due to losses from the E-mailer.

=== Discontinuation ===
The Amstrad E-mailer relied heavily on the Amserve Service to function. Without it, it deactivates.

By 2011 there were about 150,000 customers still using the Amstrad E-mailer.

== Advertising on the E-mailer ==
The emailer also included advertising on its screen but when it downloaded the adverts it was on a free 0808 number so the customer was not charged. Advertisers included Sky, AOL, BT, Orange, Toyota, Halifax, Dialaphone, HSBC and NS&I.
