= PenPad =

The term PenPad was used as a product name for a number of pen computing products by different companies in the 1980s and 1990s. The earliest was the Penpad series of products by Pencept, such as the PenPad M200 handwriting terminal, and the PenPad M320 handwriting/gesture recognition tablet for MS-DOS and other personal computers.

Other vendors using the term Penpad in product names include Amstrad and Toshiba.

The Amstrad PenPad was an early portable personal digital assistant with handwriting pen input, and a competitor to the Apple Newton. It was an attempt by Amstrad, a UK electronics firm with a history of successful involvement in personal computing, to corner the handheld market in the UK and Europe.

== PDA600 ==
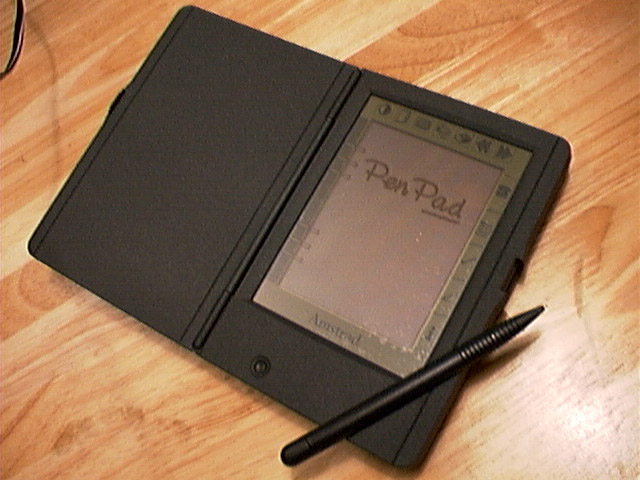
Amstrad PenPad PDA600

The Amstrad PenPad, also known by the PDA600 model reference, was launched in March 1993. Positioned as a replacement for a traditional pocket organiser, reviewers remarked on its small size - around 6.3 by 4.5 by 1 in (160 by 114 by 25 mm) - and weight of 14 ounces, noting that it was "as close to being comfortably portable as any available computer".

The PenPad had a reflective LCD screen with dimensions of 2.88 by 3.62 in (73 by 92 mm) and a resolution of 240 x 320, protected by a hinged cover folding open to the left. Around the edges of the screen, a border was "printed to resemble the section dividers and binder rings of a Filofax", providing an example of skeuomorphism but also emphasising the specialised, appliance-like nature of the product. Its five main applications, featured on the tabs or "section dividers" were a phone/address book, diary, to-do list, notepad, and a measurement conversion tool. A separate desktop application, accessible via a desk icon printed on the border above the screen, provided access to a collection of functions including an alarm clock, world clock, anniversary and appointment management, and utilities for monitoring the battery level and communicating with a personal computer. Another icon provided access to a pop-up calculator.

Interaction with the device's software was conducted using a supplied stylus to point at the icons around the edge of the screen and to user interface elements on screen, with text entry being performed by writing with the stylus on the screen itself. The recognition of handwritten text was limited to the interpretation of individual characters entered into distinct boxes displayed for the purpose of text entry, and where the recognition process would fail, the opportunity would be present to perform further training of the system for the misinterpreted character. Thus, recognition accuracy reportedly improved over time, although a "deliberate, childlike" style was regarded as beneficial. Each character would take about one second to process.

The software supported a single form of gesture, this leveraging familiarity with the six-ring Filofax binder system. When tapped, the rings caused the current page to be removed from the application, equivalent to unclipping the page in a paper organiser, with the page then being drawn as a "half-size replica" on the display. This replica could then be dragged off the display to be deleted, or the rings could be tapped again to clip the page back into the application.

The device employed a "wholly proprietary multiprocessor architecture" employing three microcontrollers. One of these was a low power version of the Zilog Z180 CPU, the Z8S180, clocked at 20 MHz. Storage was provided by 128 KB of non-volatile RAM, and a PCMCIA type I slot for use with memory expansion cards permitted up to 2 megabytes of additional storage. A proprietary serial port offered the ability to link to a PC via an RS-232 adapter cable. Three AA batteries powered the unit for a claimed 40 hours of use.

The product itself was designed for Amstrad by the Eden Group, employing character recognition algorithms developed by Texas Instruments, with the hardware being designed by Mutech Ltd. The project manager, Cliff Lawson, had helped develop Amstrad's previous computing products. Eden Group also wrote bespoke software for the PDA600 that run on PCMCIA memory cards, in addition to the standard PIM applications. The PDA600 could be synchronized and backed-up via Windows with the optional extra "PC-Organiser for Windows".

== Development ==
Development of end-user applications was possible but required investment in a card-writer in addition to the forms software from Eden Group, which restricted end-user development.

== Discontinuation ==
The Amstrad PenPad, like the Apple Newton, struggled in a time where these early PDAs were expensive to produce and did not manage to capture enough interest and eventually production was discontinued. The remaining UK units being sold off to the Tandy Corporation who retailed the stock through their chain of stores at £50 per unit, half the price they had cost Amstrad to build. It wasn't until the launch of the Palm Pilot 1000 in 1996 that the first truly successful PDA relying on pen input was born.

Amstrad did invest in R&D for a successor to the PDA600, called the PIC700, but with the end of the PenPad it was never released.

== See also ==
- Tablet computer
