= Westcoast Limited =

UK information technology distributor

- Type: Limited
- Industry: Computing
- Founded: 1984
- Founder: Joe Hemani
- Headquarters: Theale, Reading, United Kingdom
- Key people: Sunil Madhani (finance director)
- Revenue: £2.5bn
- Number of employees: 1600
- Website: www.westcoast.co.uk

Westcoast Limited, also known as Westcoast Group, provides IT products and services, including storage systems, servers and workstations. It provides goods and services business to business and to the education sector. In 2021, Westcoast became the largest IT distributor in the United Kingdom.

Established in 1984, the Westcoast Group remains privately held with its distributor arm, Westcoast Limited, distributing leading IT brands such as HP, HPE, Microsoft, Lenovo, Apple, and many others to a broad range of resellers, retailers and office product dealers in the UK and beyond.

Westcoast Limited has grown to become the number one UK distributor for many vendors and customers. The Westcoast Group employs more than 1,600 people across a number of locations in the UK, Ireland and Europe.

Westcoast Limited was the largest privately owned company in the Thames Valley before being a merger with European distributor ALSO group was announced in July 2024

== History ==
The company was founded in 1984 in Reading, United Kingdom.

Orion Media Marketing, printer consumables distributor was acquired in 2005.

In 2006, the company bought Irish IT distributors Clarity.

=== XMA merger ===
Westcoast merged with XMA, a printer consumables distributor, in 2008. However, no operations were consolidated and XMA continued as a distinct brand and entity. XMA also had a distribution centre in Milton Keynes.

The XMA operation was merged with Viglen in 2014.

Westcoast bought Nottingham, UK based ArtSystems in 2016. The company supply 3d printing equipment.

By 2017, XMA had a turnover of £350m.

== Operations ==
Westcoast distributes to the UK and Ireland from its centres in Reading, Nottingham, Andover, Milton Keynes and Europe. It has a data centre in Wales.
