= Amstrad =

British electronics company

Amstrad plc

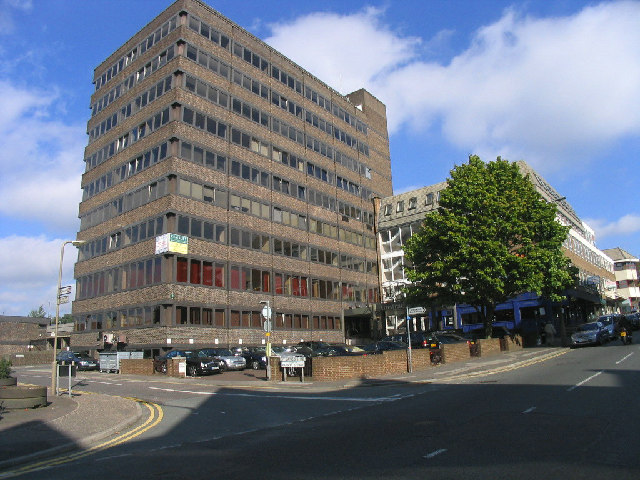
- Sugar Tower in Brentwood, England (pictured in 2005)
- Trade name: Amstrad
- Formerly: AMS Trading Co (1968–); Amstrad plc (–5/1997); Betacom plc (1997); Amstrad plc (11/1997–9/2008); Amstrad Limited (9/2008–2011)
- Type: Private (1968–1980); Public (1980–2007); Subsidiary (2007–2011)
- Traded as: LSE: AMS (1980-2007) FTSE 100 component (until 2007)
- Industry: Electronics
- Founded: 1 November 1968 (original company)
- Founder: Alan Sugar
- Defunct: 2011
- Fate: Acquired by Sky (2007); name reacquired by Sugar in 2024
- Headquarters: Kings Road, Brentwood, Essex, United Kingdom
- Area served: UK and Ireland
- Revenue: ▲£91.65 million (2006)
- Operating income: ▲£26.94 million GBP (2006)
- Net income: ▲£15.08 million GBP (2006)
- Number of employees: 85 (2005)
- Website: amstrad.com at the Wayback Machine (archived January 25, 2019)

Amstrad plc was a British consumer electronics company, founded in 1968 by Alan Sugar. During the 1980s, the company was known for its home computers beginning with the Amstrad CPC and later also the ZX Spectrum range after the Sinclair deal, which led it to have a substantial share of the home computer market in Britain. In the following decade it shifted focus towards communication technologies, and its main business during the 2000s was the manufacture of satellite television set-top boxes for Sky, which Amstrad had started in 1989 as the then sole supplier of the emerging Sky TV service.

Headquartered in Brentwood, the company was listed on the London Stock Exchange from 1980 to 2008, the year when Sugar stepped down after 40 years. After acquiring Betacom and Viglen, Amstrad was broken up in 1997 but the name was soon revived when successor Betacom plc renamed itself to Amstrad plc. Amstrad was a FTSE 100 Index constituent up until the company was acquired by BSkyB in 2007 for £125 million. In 2010, Sky integrated Amstrad's satellite division as part of Sky so they could make their own set-top boxes in-house.

== History ==
=== Early beginnings ===
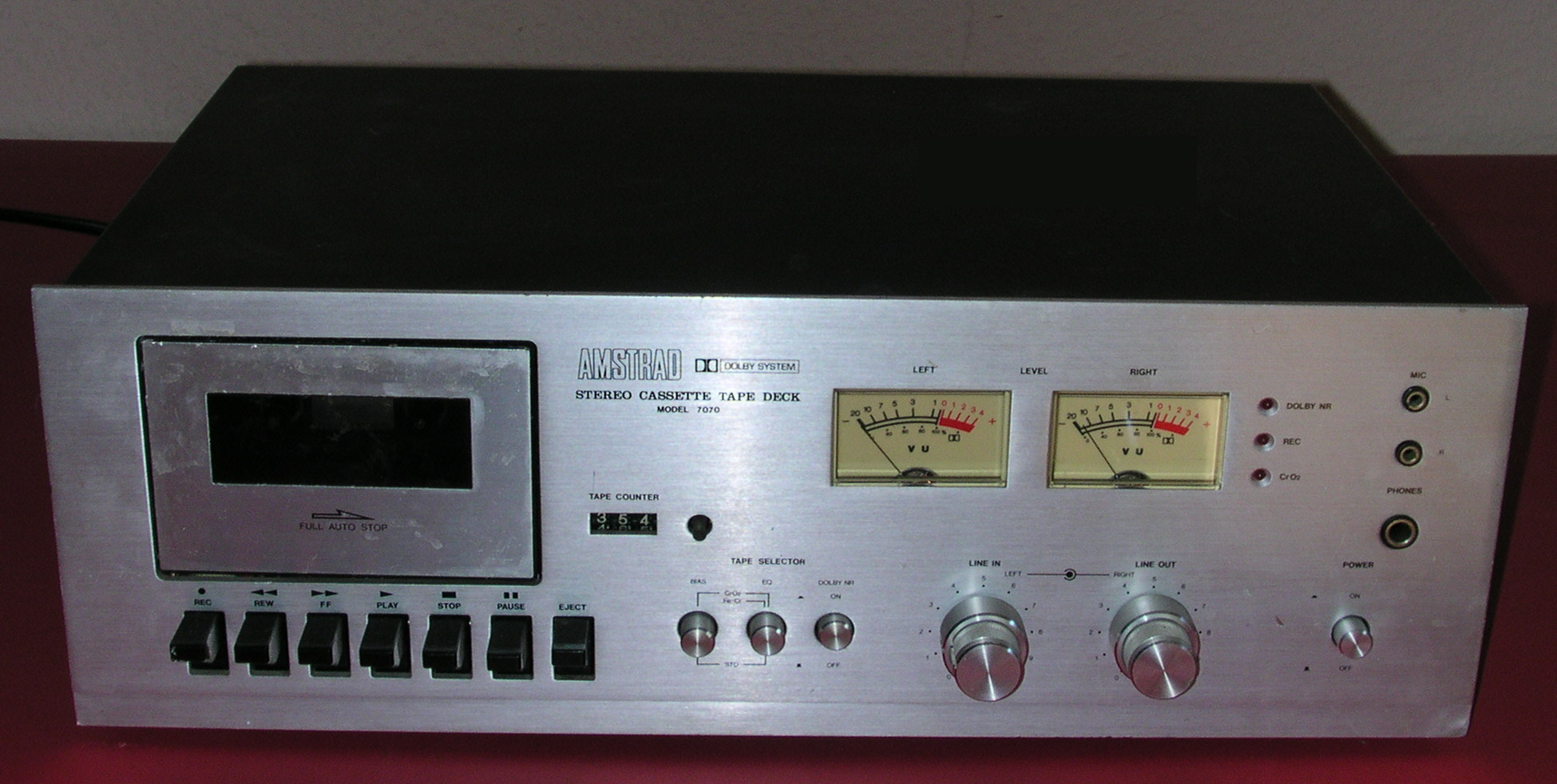
Amstrad 7070 tape deck (c. 1970s)

Amstrad (also known as AMSTrad) was founded in 1968 by Alan Sugar at the age of 21, the name of the original company being AMS Trading (Amstrad) Limited, derived from its founder's initials (Alan Michael Sugar). Amstrad entered the market in the field of consumer electronics. During the 1970s they were at the forefront of low-priced hi-fi, TV and car stereo cassette technologies. Lower prices were achieved by injection moulding plastic hi-fi turntable covers, undercutting competitors who used the vacuum forming process.

Amstrad expanded to the marketing of low cost amplifiers and tuners, imported from East Asia and badged with the Amstrad name for the UK market. Their first electrical product was the Amstrad 8000 amplifier.

=== Home computers ===
Logo of Amstrad introduced in the 1980s for their home computers

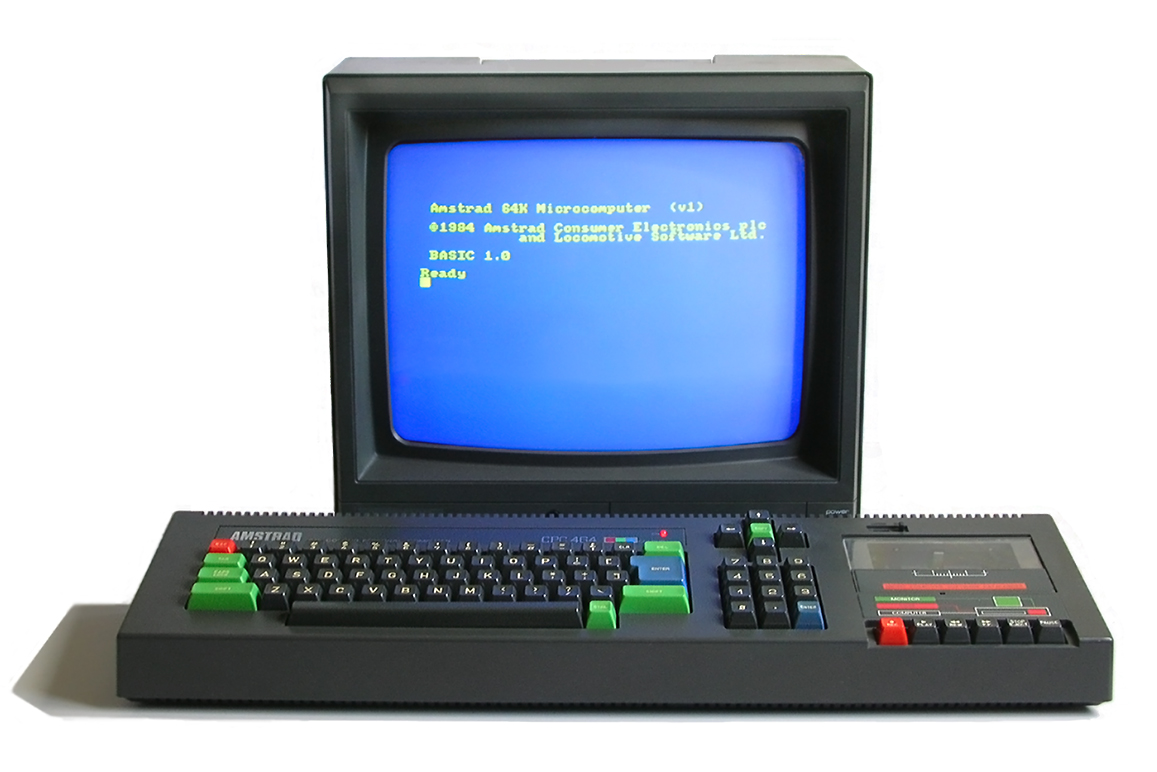
The Amstrad CPC 464 personal microcomputer (1984)

In 1980, Amstrad went public trading on the London Stock Exchange, and doubled in size each year during the early '80s. Amstrad began marketing its own home computers in an attempt to capture the market from Commodore and Sinclair, with the Amstrad CPC range in 1984. The CPC 464 was launched in the UK, Ireland, France, Australia, New Zealand, Germany, Spain and Italy. It was followed by the CPC 664 and CPC 6128 models. Later "Plus" variants of the 464 and 6128, launched in 1990, increased their functionality slightly.

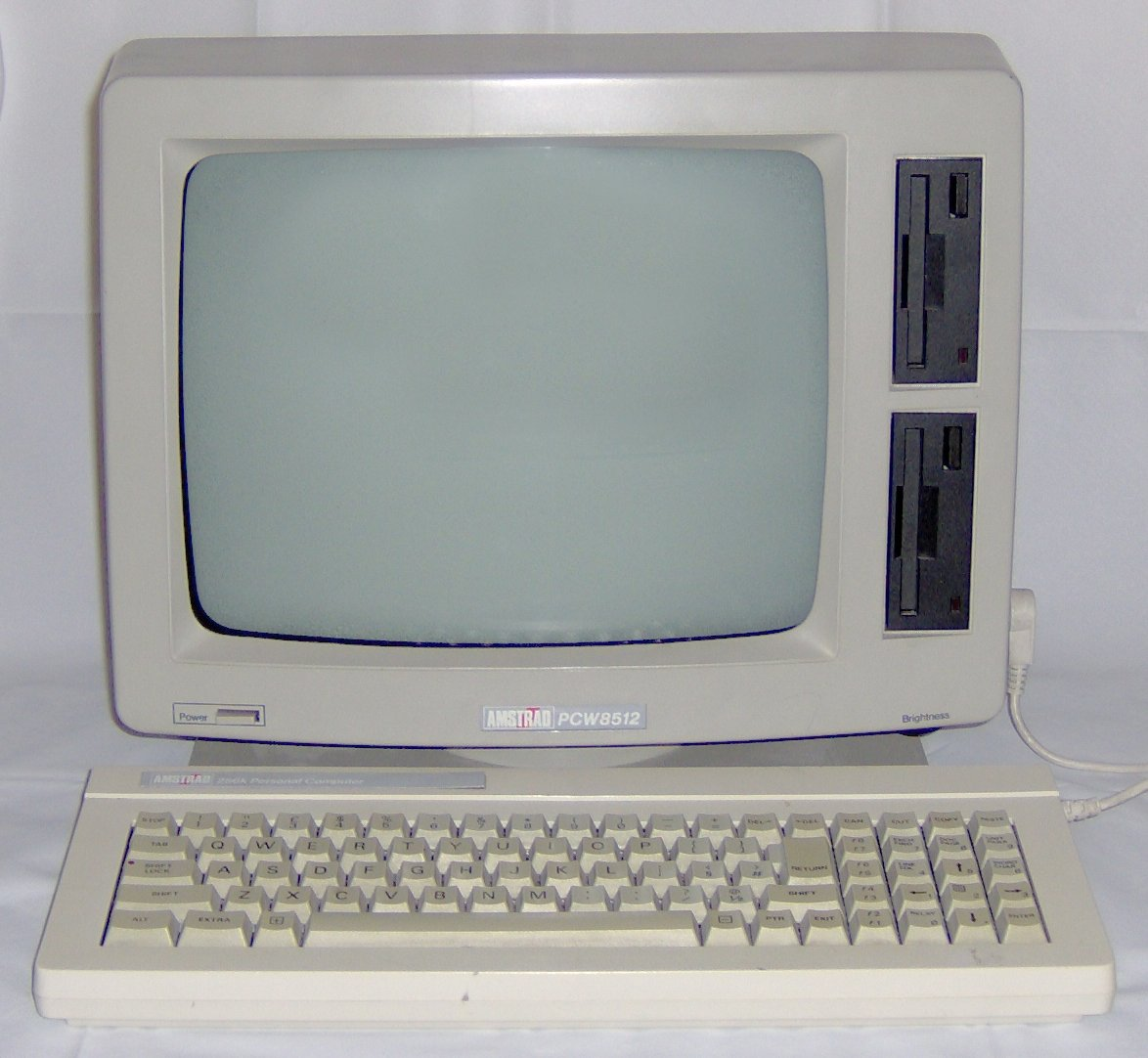
Amstrad PCW8512 word processor (1985)

In 1985, the popular Amstrad PCW range was introduced, which were principally word processors, complete with printer, running the LocoScript word processing program. They were also capable of running the CP/M operating system. The Amsoft division of Amstrad was set up to provide in-house software and consumables.

On 7 April 1986 Amstrad announced it had bought from Sinclair Research "the worldwide rights to sell and manufacture all existing and future Sinclair computers and computer products, together with the Sinclair brand name and those intellectual property rights where they relate to computers and computer related products", which included the ZX Spectrum, for £5 million. This included Sinclair's unsold stock of Sinclair QLs and Spectrums. Amstrad made more than £5 million on selling these surplus machines alone. Amstrad launched two new variants of the Spectrum: the ZX Spectrum +2, based on the ZX Spectrum 128, with a built-in cassette tape drive (like the CPC 464) and, the following year, the ZX Spectrum +3, with a built-in floppy disk drive (similar to the CPC 664 and 6128), taking the 3" disks that many Amstrad machines used.

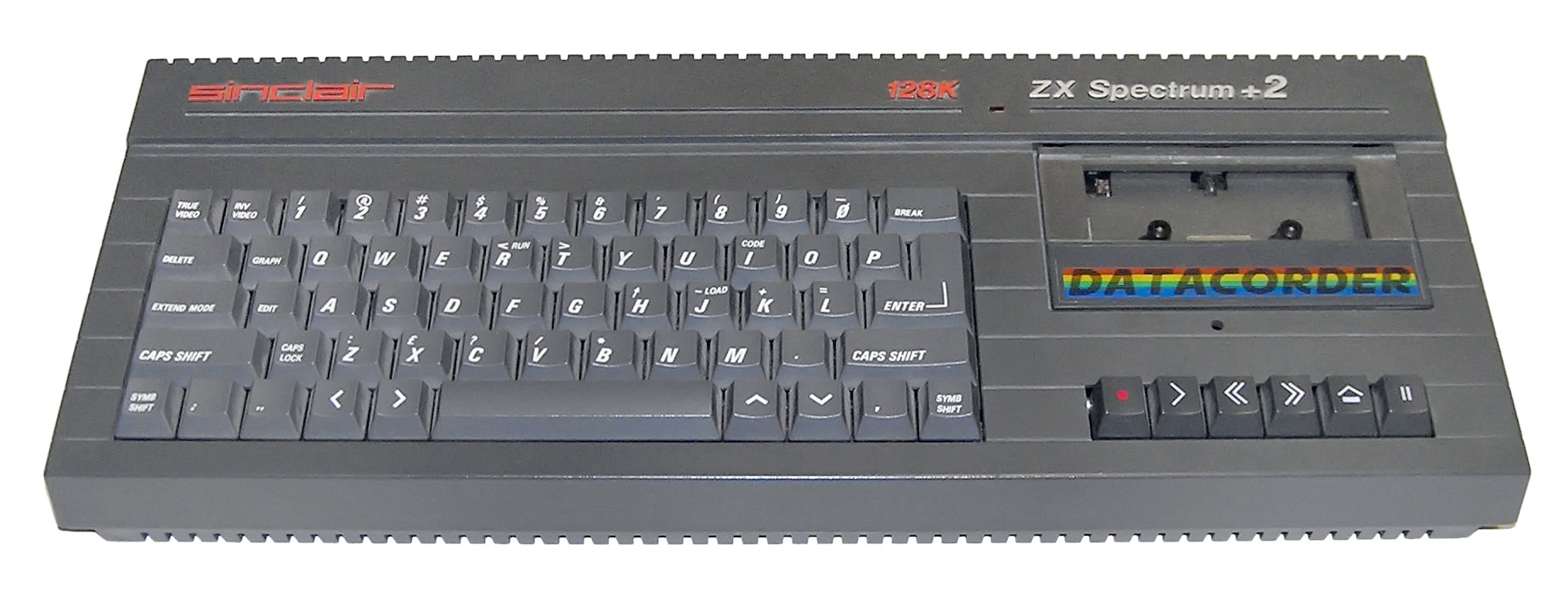
The ZX Spectrum +2 (1986). This was the first new Spectrum model released by Amstrad after their purchase of the range.

In 1986 Amstrad entered the IBM PC-compatible arena with the PC1512 system. In standard Amstrad livery and priced at £399 it was a success, capturing more than 25% of the European computer market. It was MS-DOS-based, but with the GEM graphics interface, and later Windows. In 1988 Amstrad attempted to make the first affordable portable personal computer with the PPC512 and 640 models, introduced a year before the Macintosh Portable. They ran MS-DOS on an 8 MHz processor, and the built-in screen could emulate the Monochrome Display Adapter or Color Graphics Adapter. Amstrad's final (and ill-fated) attempts to exploit the Sinclair brand were based on the company's own PCs; a compact desktop PC derived from the PPC 512, branded as the Sinclair PC200, and the PC1512 rebadged as the Sinclair PC500.

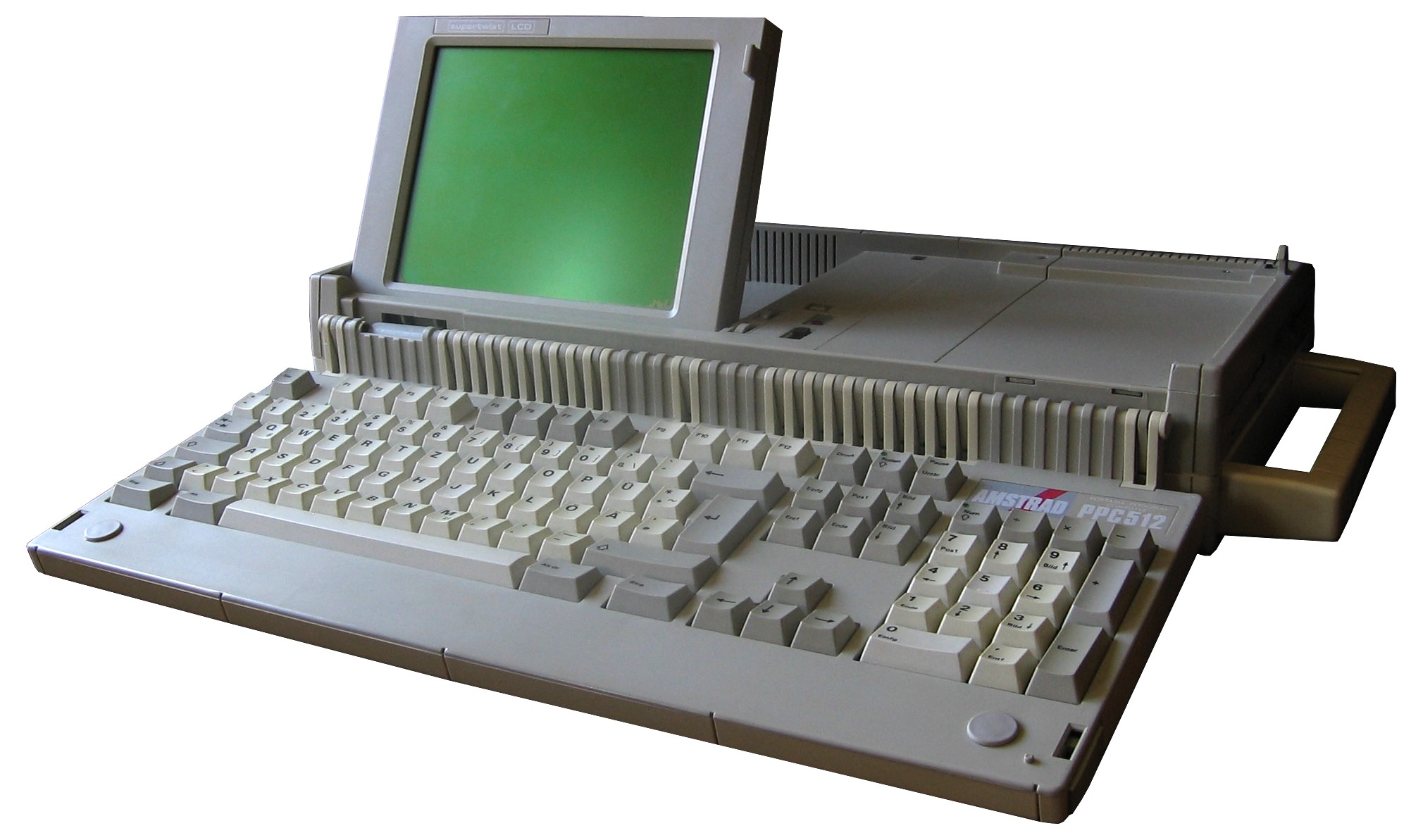
Amstrad PPC 512 portable PC (1987)

Amstrad's second generation of PCs, the PC2000 series, were launched in 1989. However, due to a problem with the Seagate ST277R hard disk shipped with the PC2386 model, these had to be recalled and fitted with Western Digital controllers. Amstrad later successfully sued Seagate, but following bad press over the hard disk problems, Amstrad lost its lead in the European PC market.

=== Launch of Sky and Astra Satellite ===
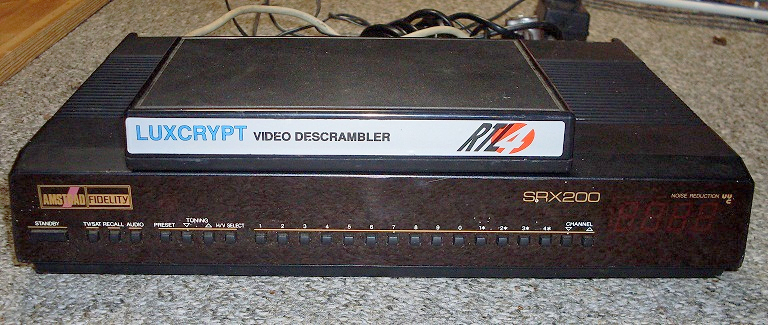
Amstrad SRX200 satellite receiver, with Luxcrypt decoder

Amstrad had been a major supplier of set top boxes to UK satellite television pay-TV provider Sky since its launch in 1989 following the launch of the SES Astra 1A TV satellite. Amstrad was key to the introduction of Sky, as the company was responsible for finding methods to produce the requisite equipment at an attractive price for the consumer - Alan Sugar famously approached "someone who bashes out dustbin lids", to manufacture mesh satellite dishes cheaply. Ultimately, it was the only manufacturer producing receiver boxes and dishes at the system's launch, and continued to manufacture set top boxes for Sky, from analogue to digital including Sky's Sky+ digital video recorder.

With the addition of the Astra 1B TV satellite in May 1991 even more TV programs were available in Central Europe. In former East Germany as well as in the parts of former West Germany that had no access to cable TV, the affordable Amstrad receiver with the typical black mesh minidish were sold in large numbers.

=== Restructuring in the 1990s ===
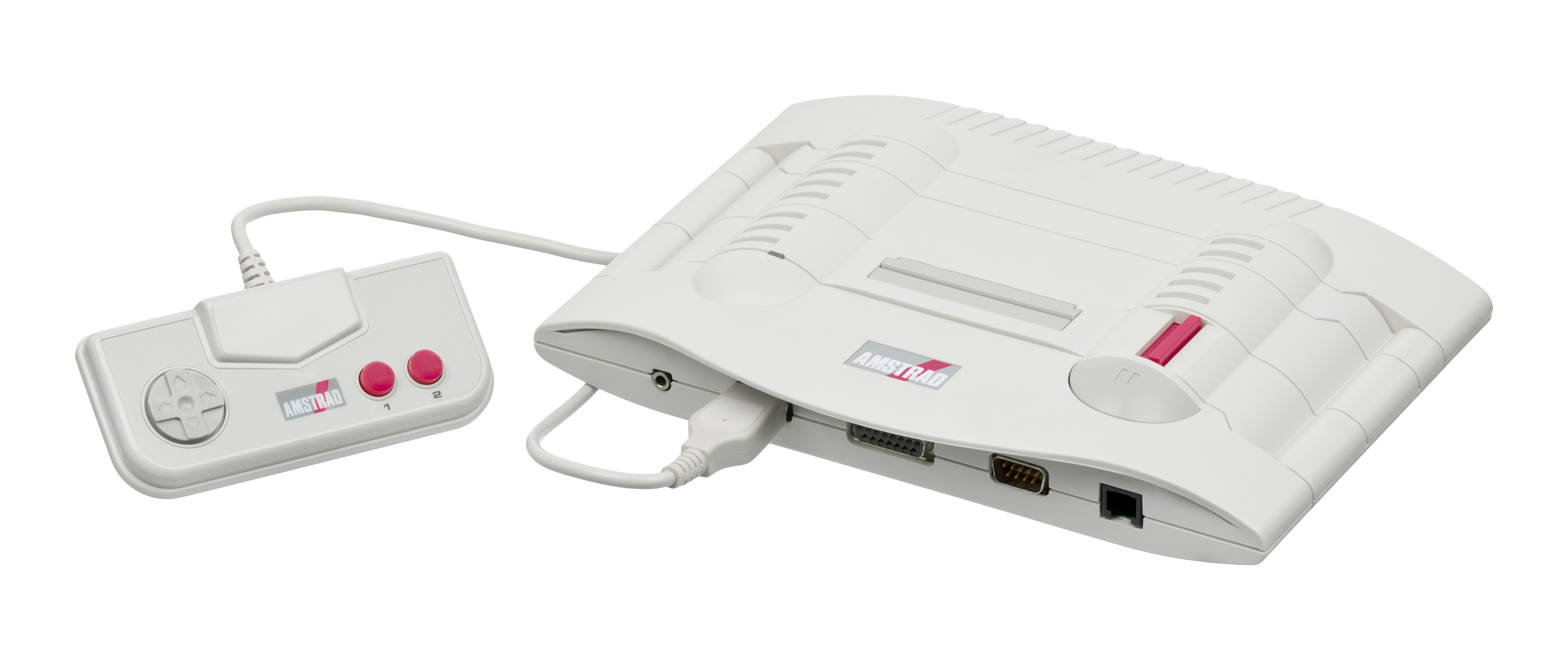
GX4000 video game console (1990)

In the early 1990s, Amstrad began to focus on portable computers rather than desktop computers. In 1990, Amstrad tried to enter the video game console market with the GX4000, similar to what Commodore did at the same time with the C64 GS. The console, based on the Amstrad 464 Plus hardware, was a commercial failure, because it used outdated technology, and most games available for it were straight ports of CPC games that could be purchased for much less in their original format.

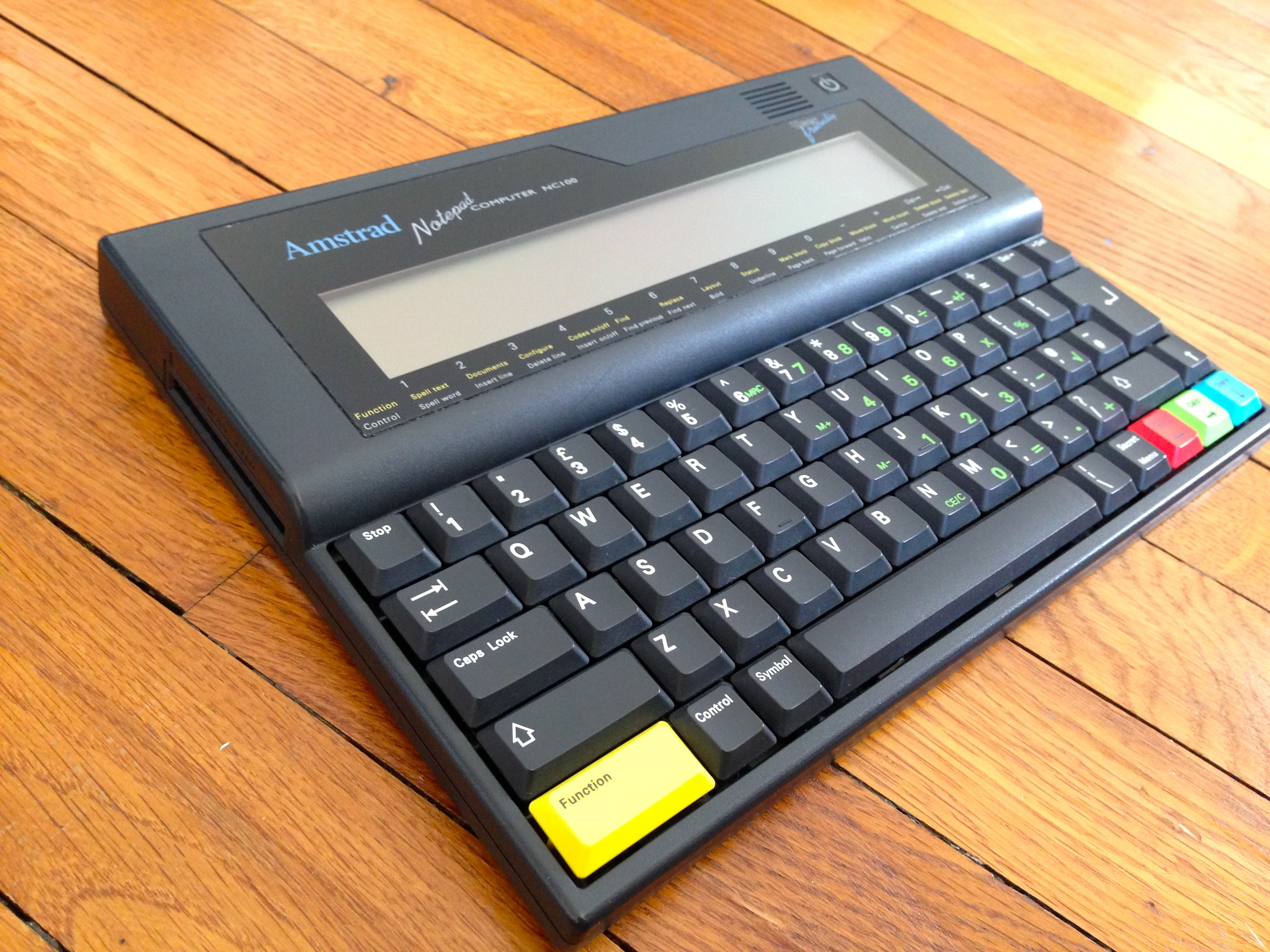
Amstrad NC100 (1992)

In 1993, Amstrad was licensed by Sega to produce a system which was similar to the Sega TeraDrive, going by the name of the Amstrad Mega PC, to try to regain their image in the gaming market. The system didn't succeed as well as expected, mostly due to its high initial retail price of £999. In that same year, Amstrad released the PenPad, a PDA similar to the Apple Newton, and released only weeks before it. It was a commercial failure, and had several technical and usability problems. It lacked most features that the Apple Newton included, but had a lower price at $450.

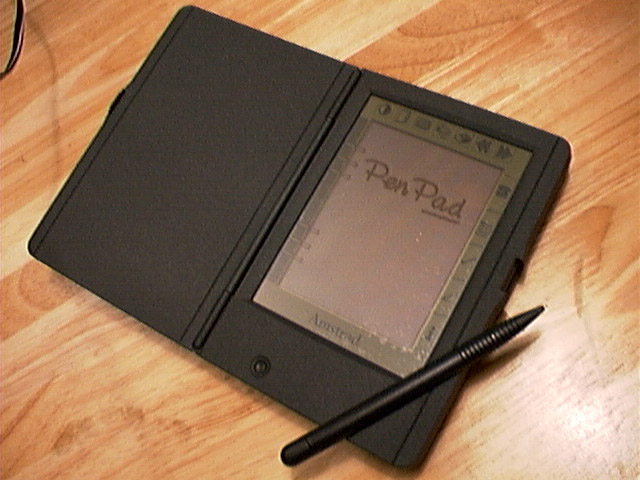
Amstrad PenPad (1993)

As Amstrad began to concentrate less on computers and more in communication, they purchased several telecommunications businesses including Betacom, Dancall Telecom, Viglen Computers, and modem manufacturer Dataflex Design Communications, bought out of liquidation, during the early 1990s. The company also established a direct marketing channel, Amstrad Direct, in late 1994 and announced 486- and Pentium-based products including an "All-in-One Multimedia PC" with built-in television tuner, infra-red remote control, amplifier and speakers. A pen-based personal digital assistant with support for a PCMCIA-based modem, the InfoPad, was also unveiled with a September 1995 launch scheduled.

By 1996, Alan Sugar was reported as having been looking for a buyer for Amstrad "for some time". Amongst the group's assets, cumulatively valued at £200 million, the Dancall subsidiary was of particular interest to potential acquirer Psion, producer of handheld computer products, for its expertise in "GSM digital mobile phone functionality" and the potential to integrate such functionality into Psion's own product range. Despite "long drawn out negotiations", the parties failed to agree a price and a strategy to dispose of the group's other assets. In 1997, Amstrad PLC was wound up, its shares being split into Viglen and Betacom instead. Betacom PLC was then renamed Amstrad PLC.

The same year, Amstrad supplied set top boxes to Australian broadcaster Foxtel, and in 2004 to Italian broadcaster Sky Italia.

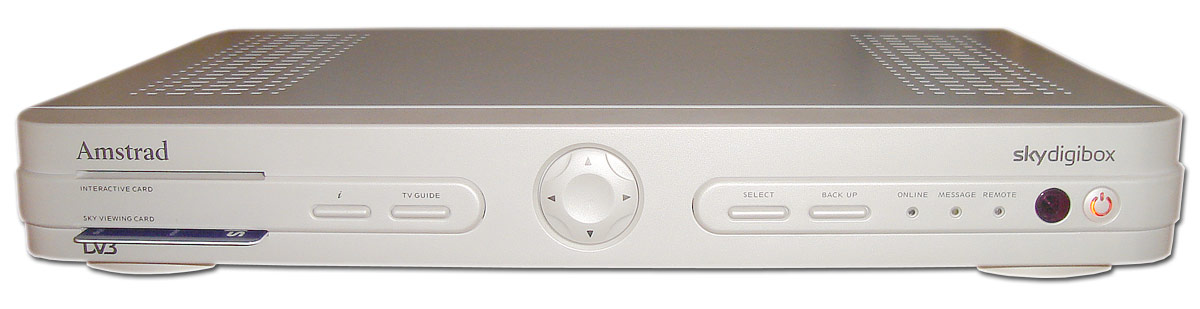
A Sky Digibox manufactured by Amstrad (2000s)

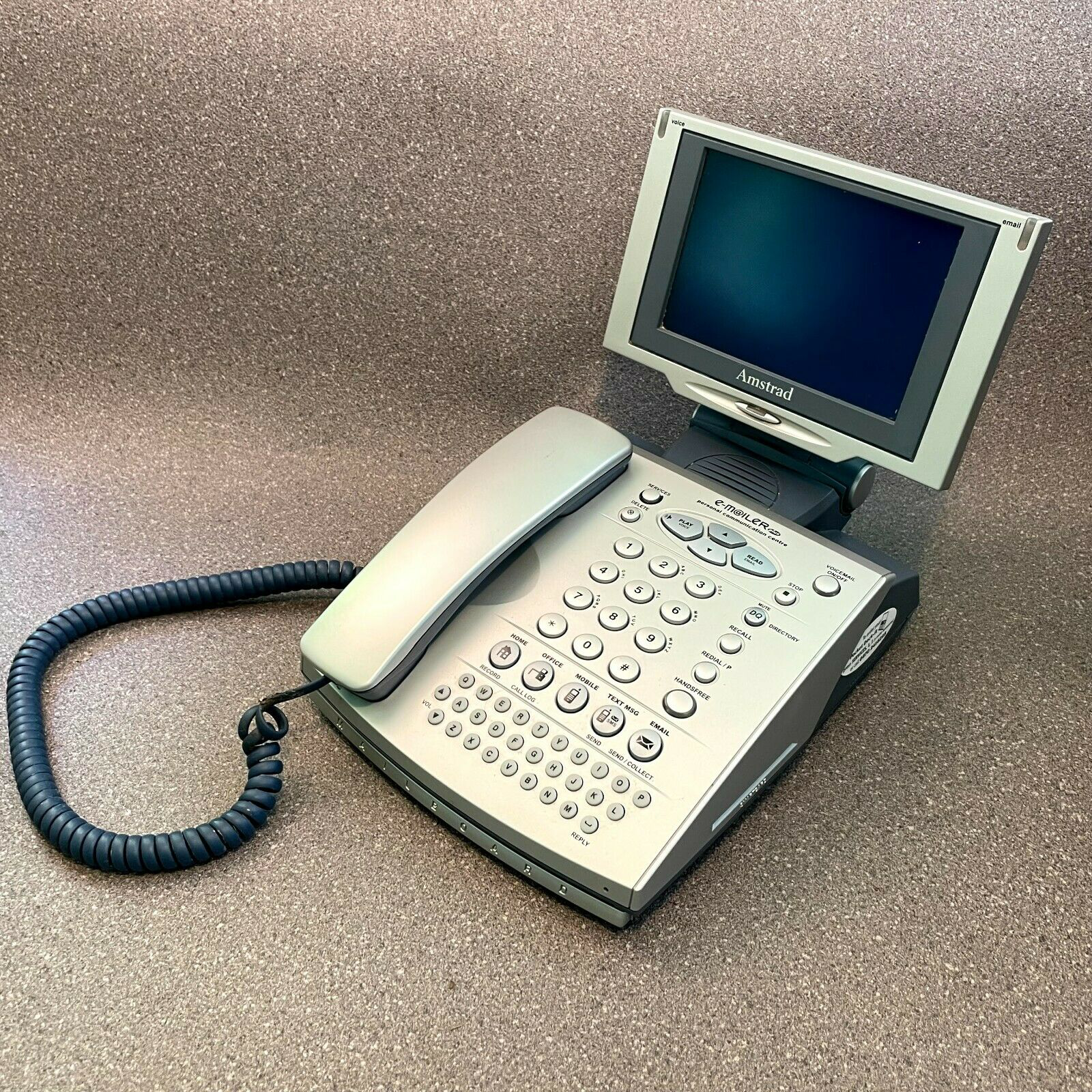
Amstrad E-mailer Plus

=== E-m@iler, Sky boxes, and final years ===
In 2000, Amstrad released the first of its combined telephony and email devices, called the E-m@iler. This was followed by the E-m@iler Plus in 2002, and the E3 Videophone in 2004. Amstrad's UK E-m@iler business is operated through a separate company, Amserve Ltd which is 89.8% owned by Amstrad and 10.2% owned by DSG International plc (formerly Dixons plc).

Amstrad has also produced a variety of home entertainment products over their history, including hi-fi, televisions, VCRs, and DVD players.

==== BSkyB takeover ====
In July 2007, British Sky Broadcasting (BSkyB) announced a takeover of Amstrad for £125m, a 23.7% premium on its market capitalisation. BSkyB had been a major client of Amstrad, accounting for 75% of sales for its 'set top box' business. Having supplied BSkyB with hardware since its inception in 1988, market analysts had noted the two companies becoming increasingly close.

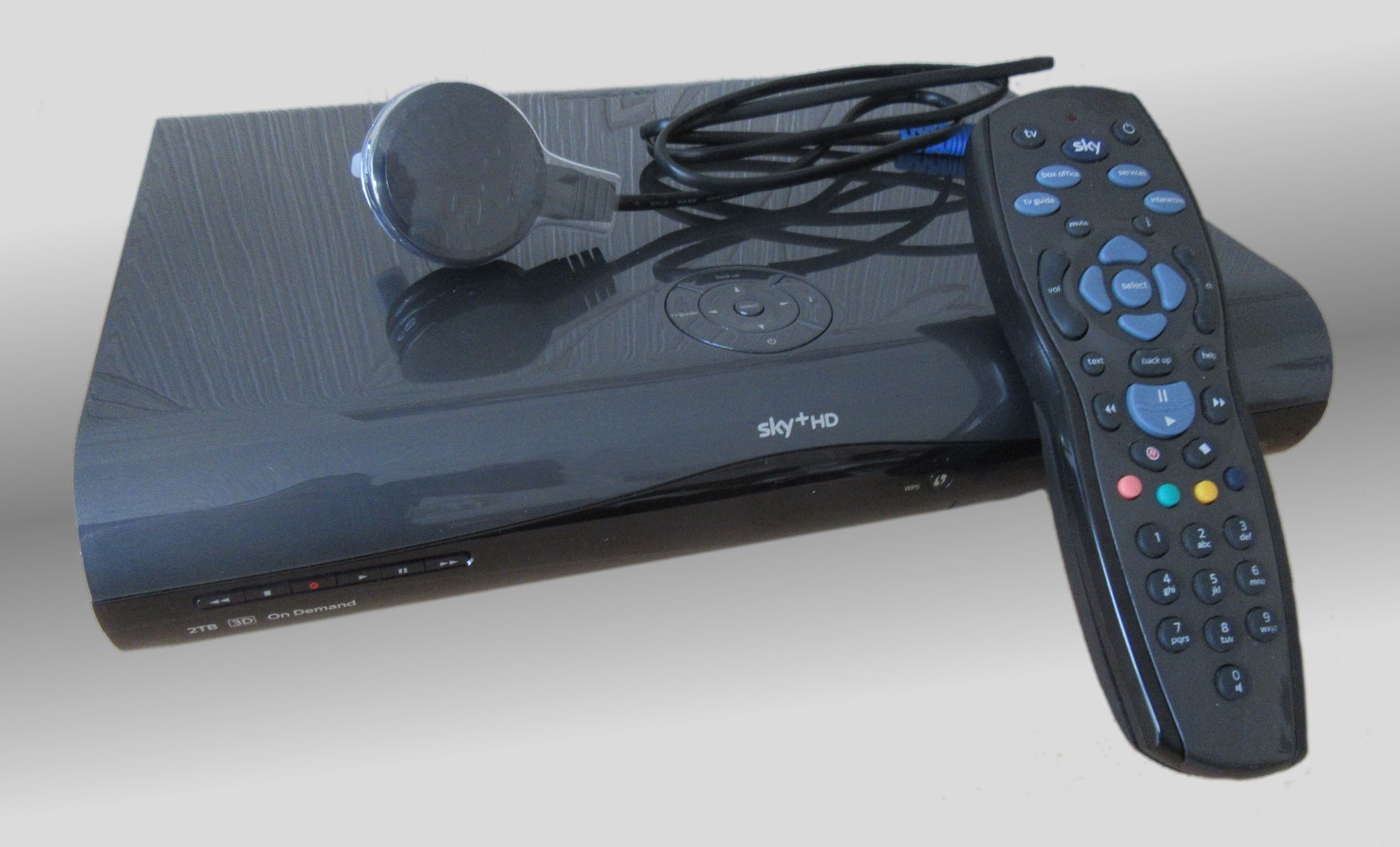
DRX895W Sky+ digital video recorder manufactured by Amstrad (without Amstrad branding, 2009)

Sky bought Amstrad so they could have their own hardware development division to develop new satellite boxes made in-house. Under Sky, Amstrad only produced satellite receivers for Sky, as doing so allows them to reduce costs by cutting out the middleman. Its main competitor in this space was Pace plc.

Sugar commented that he wished to play a part in the business, saying: "I turn 60 this year and I have had 40 years of hustling in the business, but now I have to start thinking about my team of loyal staff, many of whom have been with me for many years."

It was announced on 2 July 2008 that Sugar had stepped down as Chairman of Amstrad, which had been planned since BSkyB took over in 2007. Amstrad was taken off the Stock Exchange on 9 October 2008. Amstrad has ceased operations as a trading company, and now exists in name only. Amstrad's former offices are now a Premier Inn Hotel.

=== Revival of Amstrad name ===
In 2024 Sugar announced he had bought back the rights to the Amstrad name from Sky UK. Amstrad now belongs to a digital marketing firm named Amstrad Digital headed by Sugar's grandson Joe Baron.

== Computer product lines ==
=== Home computers ===
- CPC 464 (64 KB RAM, cassette drive)
- CPC 472 (same as CPC 464 but with 72 KB instead of 64 KB)
- CPC 664 (3 inch internal disk variant of CPC 464)
- CPC 6128 (128 KB version of the CPC 664 with 3 inch disk)
- 464 plus (CPC 464 with enhanced graphics and sound)
- 6128 plus (CPC 6128 with enhanced graphics and sound)
- GX4000 (games console based on 464 plus)
- Sinclair ZX Spectrum +2 (re-engineered ZX Spectrum 128 with tape drive)
- Sinclair ZX Spectrum +3 (as ZX Spectrum +2 but with 3 inch disk drive instead of tape drive)

=== Word processors ===
- PCW8256 (Z80, 3.5 MHz, 256 KB RAM, single 180 KB 3" floppy drive, dot-matrix printer, green screen)
- PCW8512 (same as PCW8256 but with 512 KB RAM, 180 KB 3" A: drive, 720 KB 3" B: drive)
- PCW9512 (Z80, 3.5 MHz, 512 KB RAM, single or dual 720 KB 3" floppy drives, daisywheel printer, "paper white" screen)
- PcW9256 (Z80, 3.5 MHz, 256 KB RAM, single 720 KB 3.5" floppy drive, dot-matrix printer, "paper white" screen)
- PcW9512+ (same as PCW9512 but with single 3.5" 720 KB floppy drive)
- PcW10 (same as PcW9256 but with 512 KB RAM and a built-in parallel port)
- PcW16 (Z80, 16 MHz, single 1.44 MB 3.5" floppy drive, new machine not directly compatible with old PCWs)

=== Notepad computers ===
- NC100 (Z80, 64 KB RAM, 80×8 character LCD)
- NC150 (NC100 with 128 KB RAM, floppy disk interface and NC200 firmware — sold in France and Italy)
- NC200 (Z80, 128 KB RAM, adjustable 80×16 character LCD, 3.5 in floppy disk drive)

=== PC compatibles ===
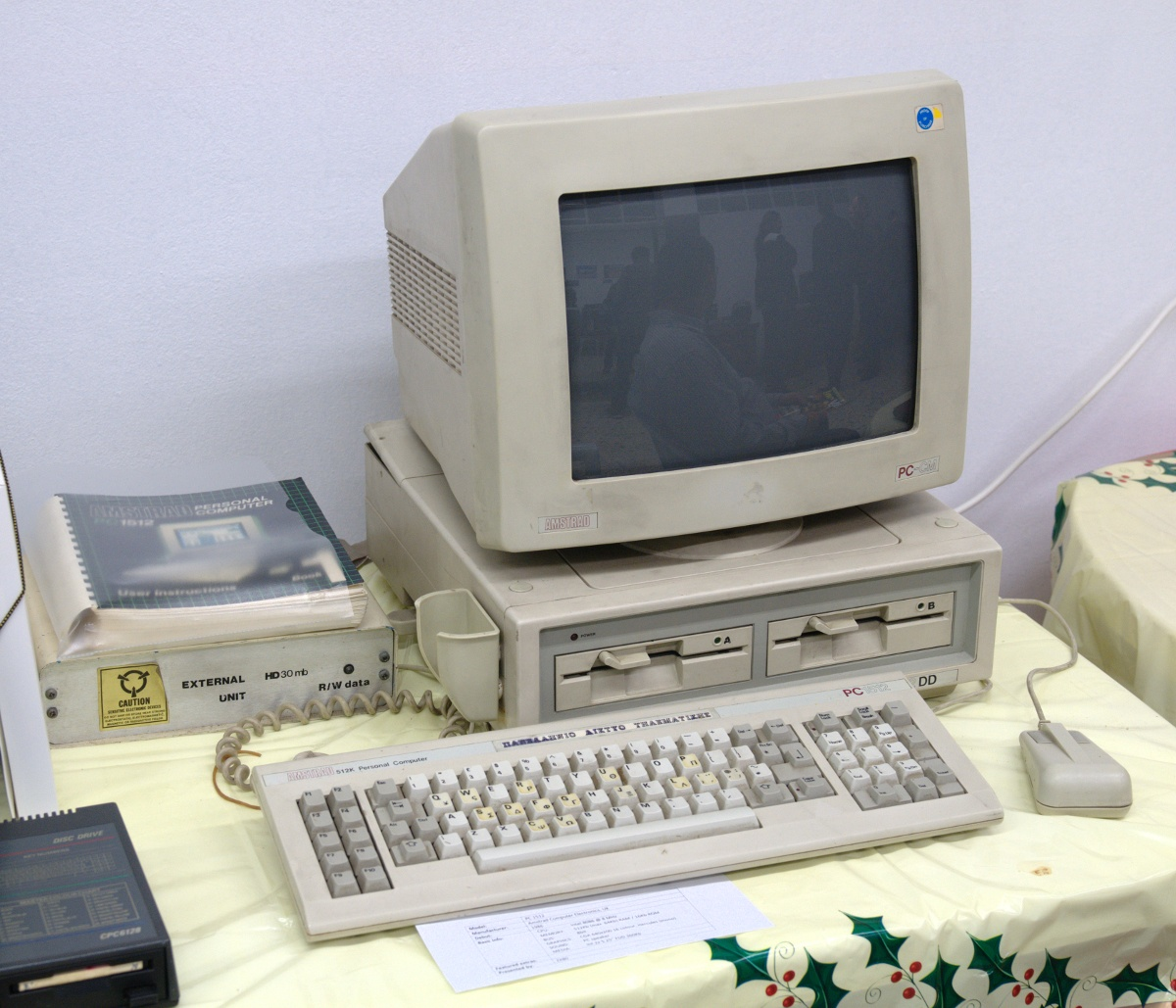
Amstrad PC1512

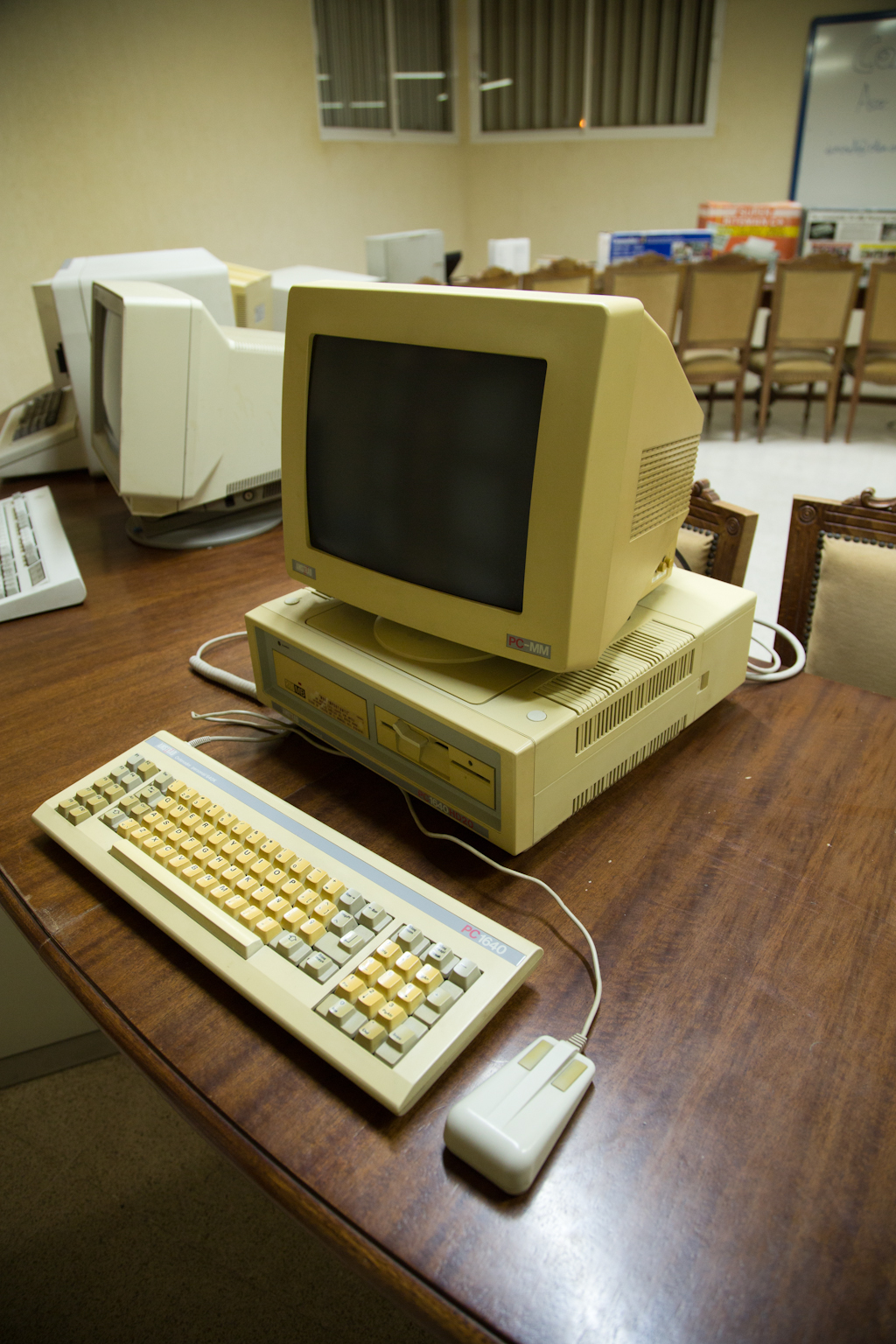
Amstrad PC1640

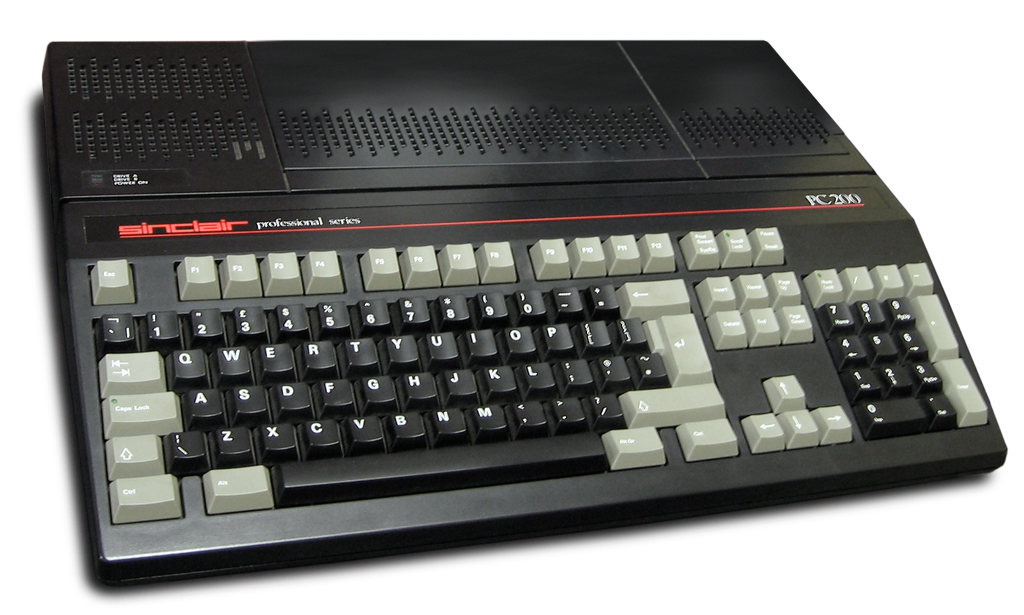
Sinclair PC 200

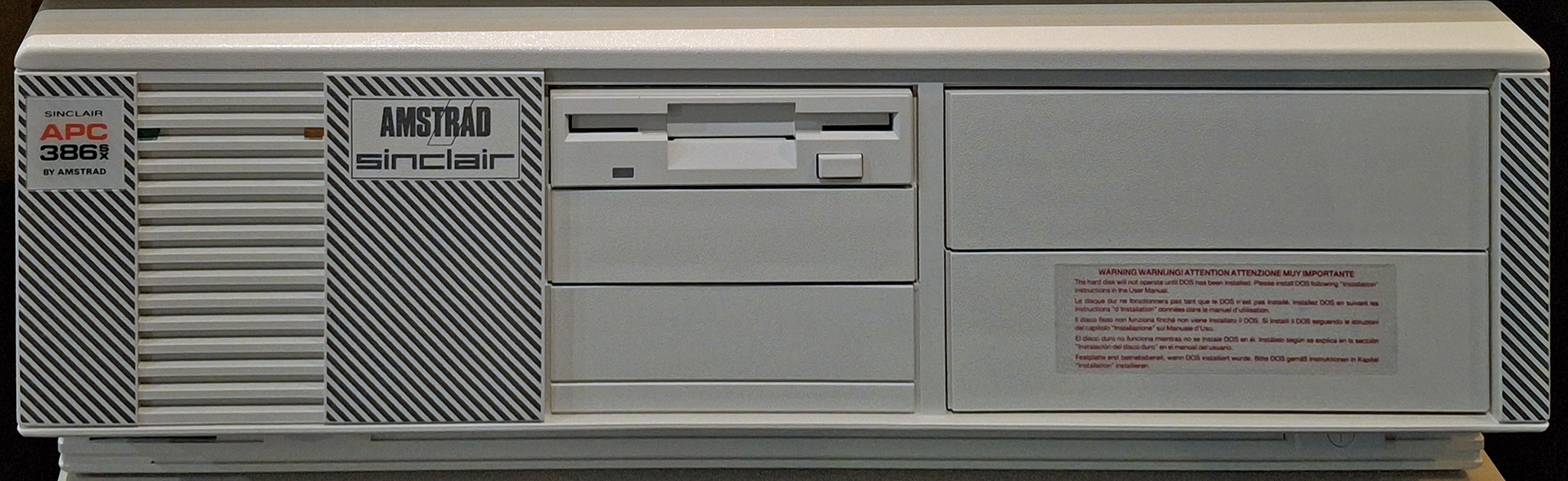
Sinclair APC 386SX by Amstrad

- PC1512 (Intel 8086, 8 MHz, 512 KB RAM, enhanced CGA graphics up to 640x200x16) - Marketed in the United States as the PC5120
- PC1640 (Intel 8086, 8 MHz, 640 KB RAM, MDA/Hercules/CGA/EGA colour graphics) - Marketed in the United States as the PC6400
- PPC512 (Portable using NEC V30 processor, 512 KB RAM, non-backlit supertwist CGA, one or two 720 KB 3.5" floppy drives) - released around the same time as the PC1512.
- PPC640 (Portable using NEC V30 processor, 640 KB RAM, non-backlit supertwist CGA, one or two 720 KB 3.5" floppy drives, internal modem) - released around the same time as the PC1640.
- Sinclair PC200 (integral desktop PC for home computer market based on PPC512)
- PC-20 the Australian and United States version of the Sinclair PC200 except that the United States version does not have a RF modulator.
- Sinclair PC500 (rebadged PC1512)
- PC1286
- PC1386 (Intel 80386SX CPU, 20 MHz, 1 MB RAM)
- PC2086 (Intel 8086 CPU, 8 MHz, 640 KB RAM, VGA graphics) launched 1989
- PC2286 (Intel 80286 CPU, 12.5 MHz, 1 MB RAM, VGA graphics) launched 1989
- PC2386 (Intel 80386DX CPU, 20 MHz, 4 MB RAM, VGA graphics) launched 1989.
- PC3086 (8 MHz 8086 CPU, 640 KB RAM)
- PC3286 (16 MHz 80286 CPU, 1 MB RAM)
- PC3386SX (20 MHz 80386SX CPU, 1 MB RAM)
- PC4386SX (20 MHz 80386SX CPU, 4 MB RAM)
- PC5086 (8 MHz 8086 CPU, 640 KB RAM)
- PC5286 (16 MHz 80286 CPU, 1 MB RAM)
- PC5386SX (20 MHz 80386SX CPU, 2 MB RAM, VGA graphics) launched 1991
- PC6486SX
- PC7000 series: PC7286, PC7386SX, PC7486SLC
- PC8486
- PC9486 (25 or 33 MHz 80486SX, or 50 MHz 80486DX2)
- PC9486i (66 MHz 80486DX2 CPU, 4 MB RAM)
- PC9555i (120 MHz Pentium)
- Amstrad Mega PC (Intel 80386SX CPU, 25 MHz, Integrated Mega Drive)
- ALT286 (laptop; 16 MHz 80286 CPU, 1 MB RAM)
- ALT386SX (laptop; 16 MHz 80386SX CPU, 1 MB RAM)
- ACL386SX (laptop; 20 MHz 80386SX CPU, 1 MB RAM, colour TFT LCD)
- ANB386SX (notebook; 80386SX CPU, 1 MB RAM)

=== PC accessories ===
- Amstrad DMP1000 9-pin dot matrix printer
- Amstrad DMP3000, DMP3160, DMP3250di 9-pin dot matrix printer (different printing speed), the special model 3250di (dual interface) having both serial and parallel ports
- Amstrad SM2400 2400 baud internal modem (came with Mirror software)

=== PDA ===
- PDA 600 Pen Pad (1993, Z8S180 CPU)

=== Set-top box ===
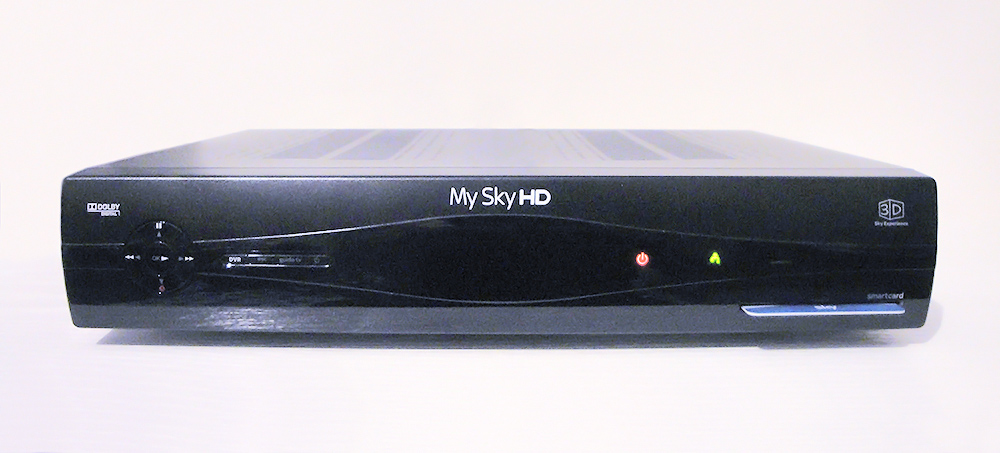
Amstrad set top box (DRX890I) manufactured for Sky Italia

- Amstrad/Fidelity Satellite Systems SRX100 (1989), SRX200 (1989), SRD400 (1990)
- Amstrad Sky box DRX100 (2001), DRX200 (2001), DRX300 (2003), DRX400 (2004), DRX500 (2004), DRX550, (2006)
- Amstrad Sky+ box DRX180 (2003), DRX280 (2003)
- Amstrad Sky+HD box DRX780 (2007), DRX890, DRX895 (2009)
- Amstrad Sky HD Multiroom Receiver DRX595 (2011)

== See also ==
- Amsoft
- PC1512
- Amstrad Action
- Amstrad NC150
- Amstrad NC200
- Amstrad NC100
