= Amstrad PC1512 =

1986 PC-compatible microcomputer

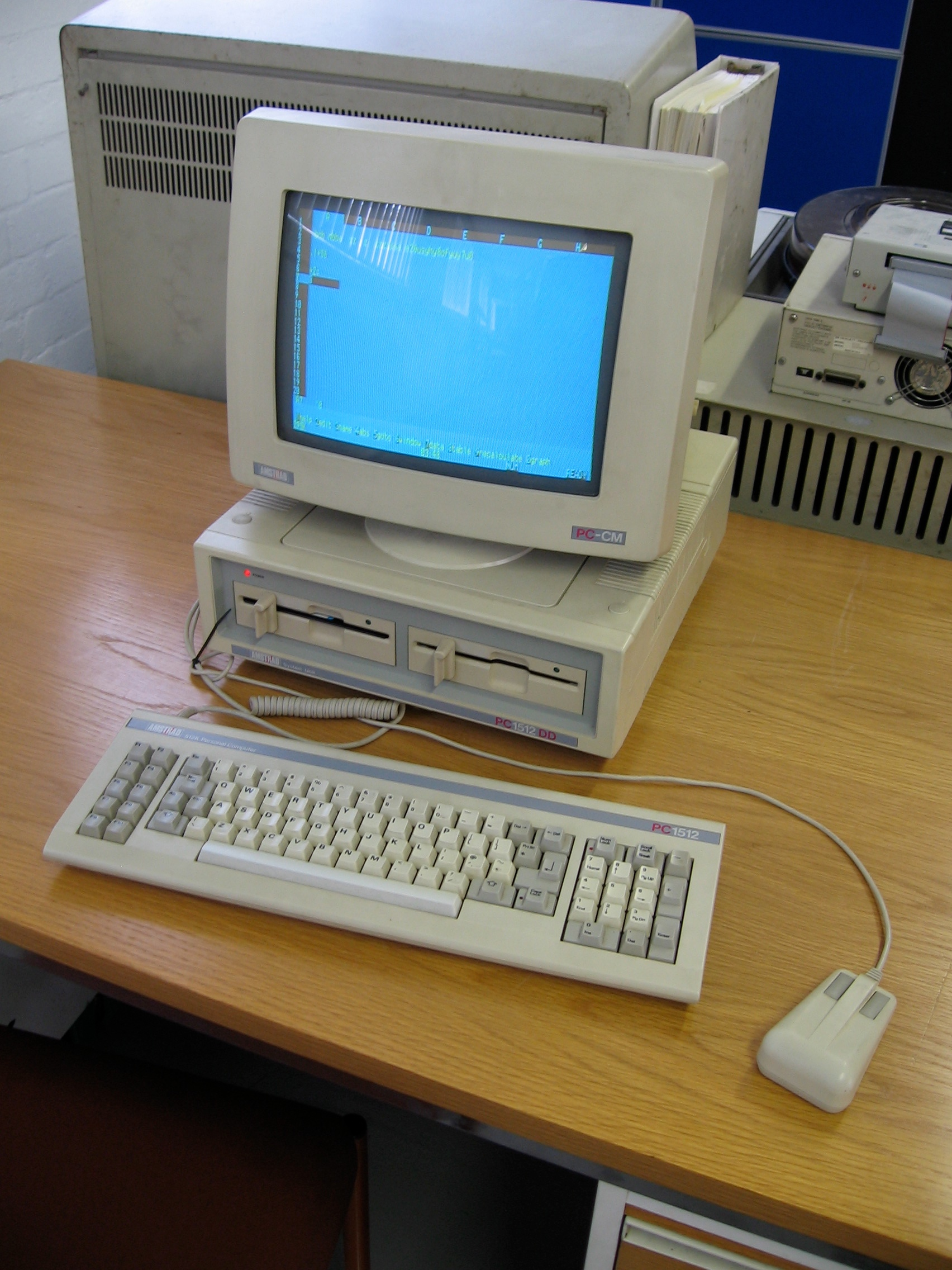
- Amstrad PC-1512 at National Museum of Computing, Bletchley Park, UK
- Also known as: Schneider PC1512, PC1640, PC6400, Sinclair PC500
- Manufacturer: Amstrad
- Type: Personal computer
- Released: 1986
- Introductory price: £399 plus VAT
- Operating system: MS-DOS 3.2 and DOS Plus
- CPU: Intel 8086 @ 8 MHz
- Memory: 512 KB (expandable to 640 KB)
- Storage: 10 or 20 MB HDD (optional)
- Removable storage: 5¼-inch floppy disks
- Display: BW or color monitor; 640×200 with 16 colors
- Graphics: CGA compatible
- Sound: PC speaker
- Input: Keyboard, Joystick, Amstrad mouse, light pen
- Connectivity: RS232, parallel port
- Dimensions: 372 × 284 × 135 mm (14.6 × 11.9 × 5.3 inches)
- Weight: 6.05 kg / 7.75 kg (13.3 / 17.1 lbs.)
- Successor: Amstrad PC2286

The Amstrad PC1512 was Amstrad's mostly IBM PC-compatible computer system, launched in 1986, and advertised with prices from £399 plus VAT. The system was also marketed in the US by Texas-based Vidco Inc. from the start of 1987. Later in 1987, a slightly updated version called the PC1640 was introduced, also marketed as the PC6400 and Sinclair PC500. Schneider branded machines for the German market were also sold.

== Features ==
Whereas IBM's PC (and almost all PC compatibles) had a power supply in a corner of the main case, the PC1512's power supply was integrated with that of its monitor. The monitor had sufficient venting to cool itself by convection, instead of needing a fan. The PC1512 was therefore quieter than other PCs. Rumours circulated that an Amstrad PC would overheat, and while existing owners would note that this did not happen, new buyers were discouraged. As a result, later models had a cooling fan integrated into the main case. Another example of rumour was the suggestion that there were issues with the 'unshielded' power supply in the monitor affecting an optional hard drive that could be installed at the back of the base unit and further that this would be solved by taping tin foil or aluminum foil over the back of the base unit or the bottom of the monitor to shield the hard drive.

The PC1512 shipped with one or two 360KB 5¼-inch floppy drives, and optionally a hard drive (10 or 20 MB). The 5¼-inch floppy drive(s) could be replaced with 1.2 MB capacity versions.

Amstrad licensed both MS-DOS 3.2 and Digital Research DOS Plus, which was largely compatible with MS-DOS and included some features from CP/M and the ability to read CP/M disks. Only one of these operating systems could be used at a time. They also licensed the GEM windowing system, which supported the customized CGA hardware of the 1512.

In 1987 the PC1512 was followed by the PC1640, which had 640 KB of RAM and an EGA-compatible graphics chipset, acquired from Paradise Systems, integrated into the main board of the machine, although only the ECD model could display all EGA modes. The PC1640 also allowed replacing the internal graphics adapter with a 8-bit ISA VGA graphics expansion board, which made it more versatile than the PC1512.

Both the PC1512 and the PC1640 could be upgraded with a NEC V30 CPU, that increased and added 80186 instruction set compatibility, and by adding an Intel 8087 mathematical coprocessor (FPU). Upgraded with the FPU, the PC1512 and PC1640 did outperform later PC architectures (i.e. 80286 w/o FPU) in numerical operations, which was highly useful for CAD and numerical calculations. Lotus 1-2-3 and Matlab supported the 8087. A performance benchmarks as conducted with Checkit compares the different models and configurations of the PC1512 and PC1640, with that of a fast 80286.

Amstrad also attempted to expand its market share by selling computers in the United States. In the US the PC1640 was marketed as the PC6400 and included a 20 MB hard drive.

== Reception ==
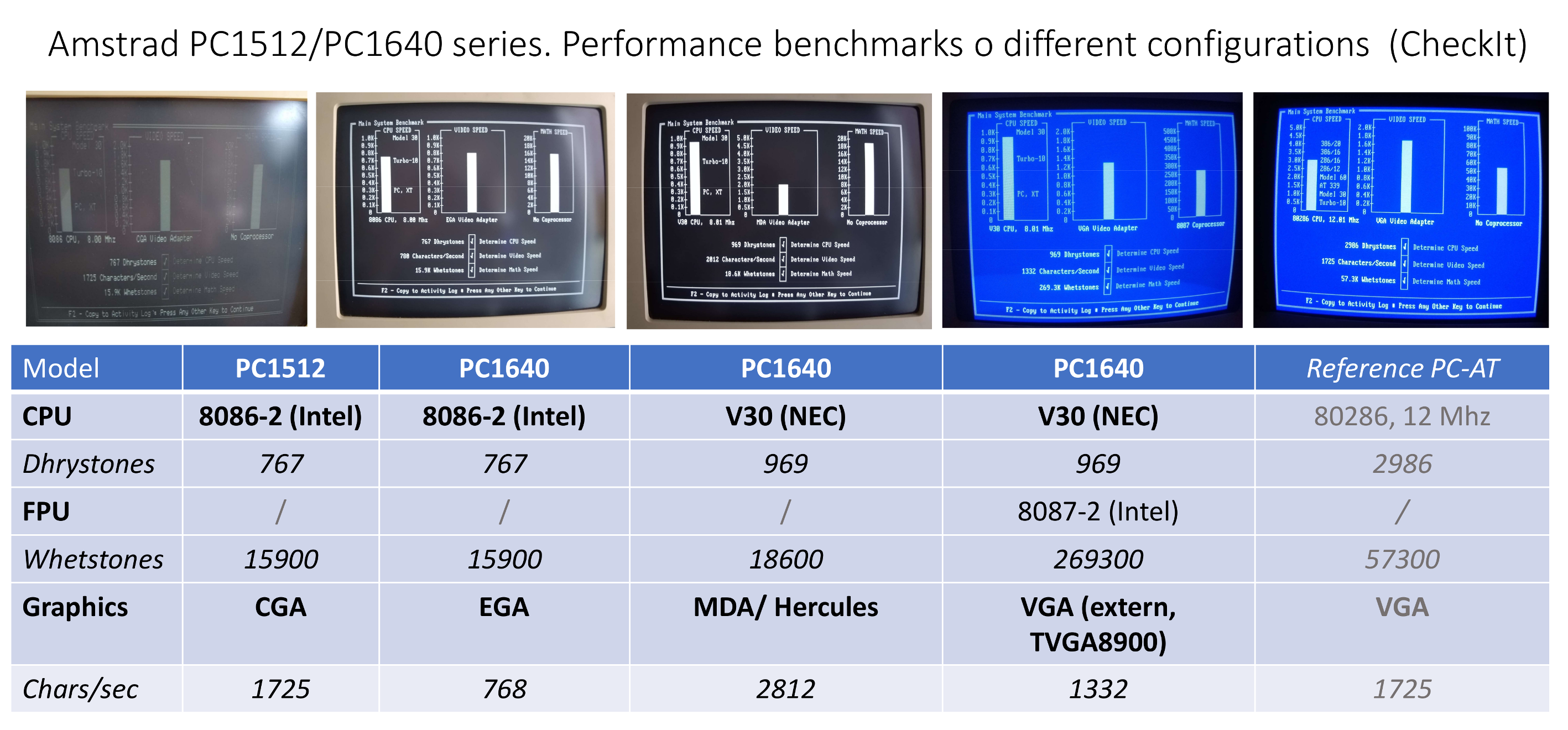
Performance benchmark of the Amstrad PC1512, PC1640 series

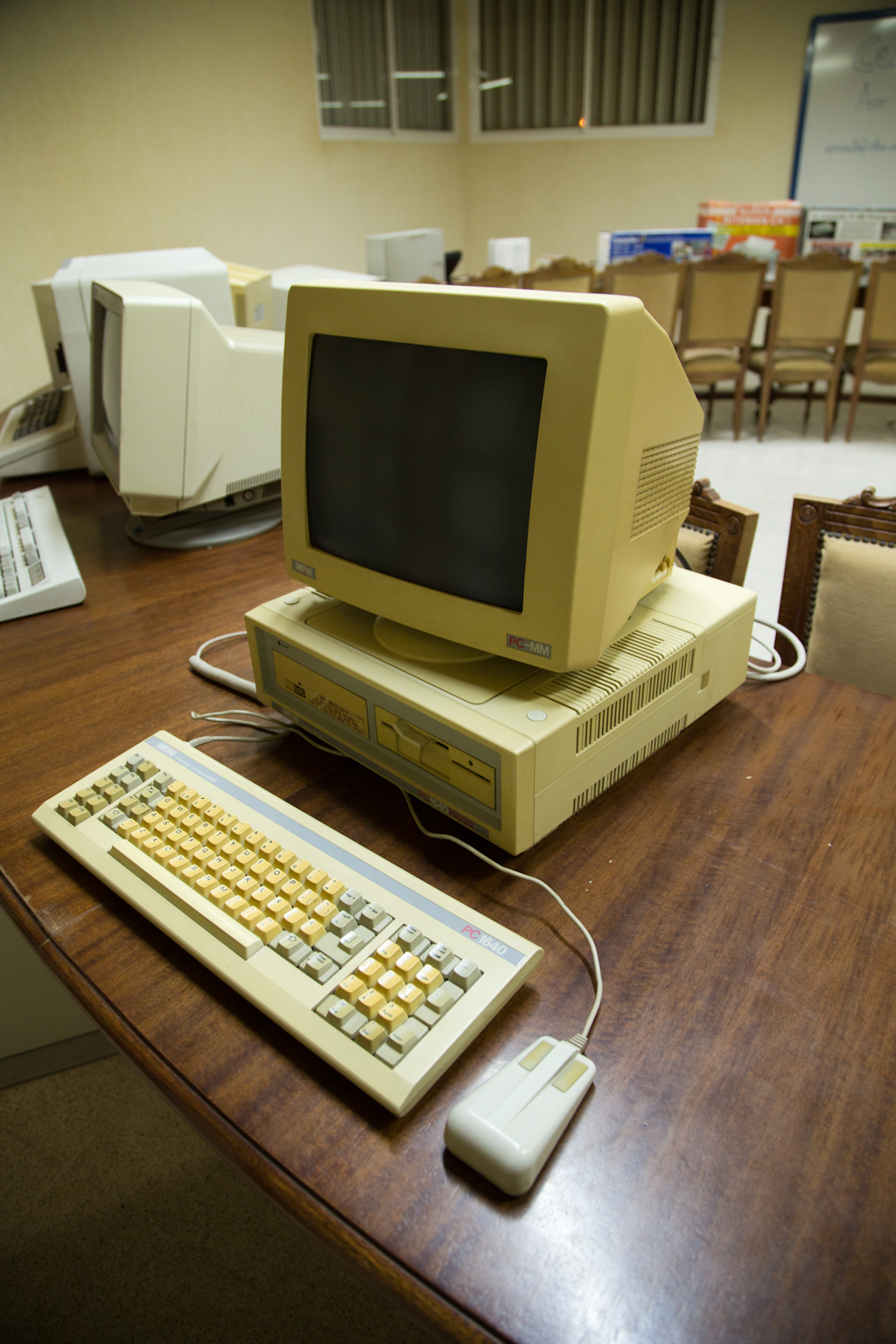
Amstrad PC1640 on display in Museo Almeriense de Retroinformática

The PC1512, and also its successor the PC1640, sold very well. Part of it was explained because the basic model (one floppy drive, no hard disk) launched for £399, which made it one of the first cheap PCs in Europe. This price, which initially increased to £450, was restored in September 1987 amidst adjustments in Amstrad's PC range.

Second, its design was compact and visually appealing. With the exception of the fan in the PC1640's ECD monitor, both the PC1512 and the PC1640 were silent. This was a significant difference compared to the quite noisy PCs sold at the time.

Although the Amstrad PC1512 and PC1640 had to compete against faster AT-type architectures at the time of their release, they were sufficiently powerful to run office software popular in the late 1980s and early 1990s, including WordPerfect 5.1, WordStar, Microsoft Word 4 and 5 for DOS, the spreadsheet Lotus 1-2-3, Matlab, and the database program dBase III+ as well as Ashton-Tate's Framework II integrated office suite. The PC1512 and PC1640 were shipped with Digital Research's GEM as a graphical shell, but could run also Geoworks Ensemble (up to Version 2.1), and Microsoft Windows (up to Version 3.0, that did support a 'real mode').

The PC1512 significantly helped open up the European PC market to consumers as well as businesses, and Amstrad's advertising of the PC1512 was aimed at homes rather than offices. The 1512's influence was such that the UK PC magazine PC Plus originally targeted itself at the "Amstrad PC 1512 and compatibles", since home ownership of other PCs at the time was rare.

The PC1512 shipped with 512 KB of RAM; it could be upgraded to 640 KB of RAM with 16 pieces of 4164-120 Dynamic RAM chips (64KBx1 per chip) and setting a jumper. Video output was compatible with the CGA standard, with an extension allowing all 16 colours to be used in the 640×200 graphics mode. The CPU of both the PC1512 and the later PC1640 was an 8 MHz Intel 8086, which was sufficient for playing The Secret of Monkey Island, Maniac Mansion and Prince of Persia. The power supply was located in the monitor, which made upgrading difficult.

The input devices supplied with the machine were notable. The mouse was an Amstrad Mouse, which was incompatible with serial mice common at the time. It was supported by some games, including Elite, but many DOS programs had problems with it. The keyboard sported an Atari-compatible joystick port for digital joysticks. Joystick movements and buttons were mapped to unused keyboard codes, allowing the joystick to be used in many DOS games that were written for keyboard control.

The series was somewhat unusual for the fact that it had a physical volume control on the internal speaker. This allowed the user to make the machine beep quietly, or silently, from boot time onwards. This innovation is still not present in most modern PCs: the legacy beeper is typically still a fixed-volume device.

== Specifications ==
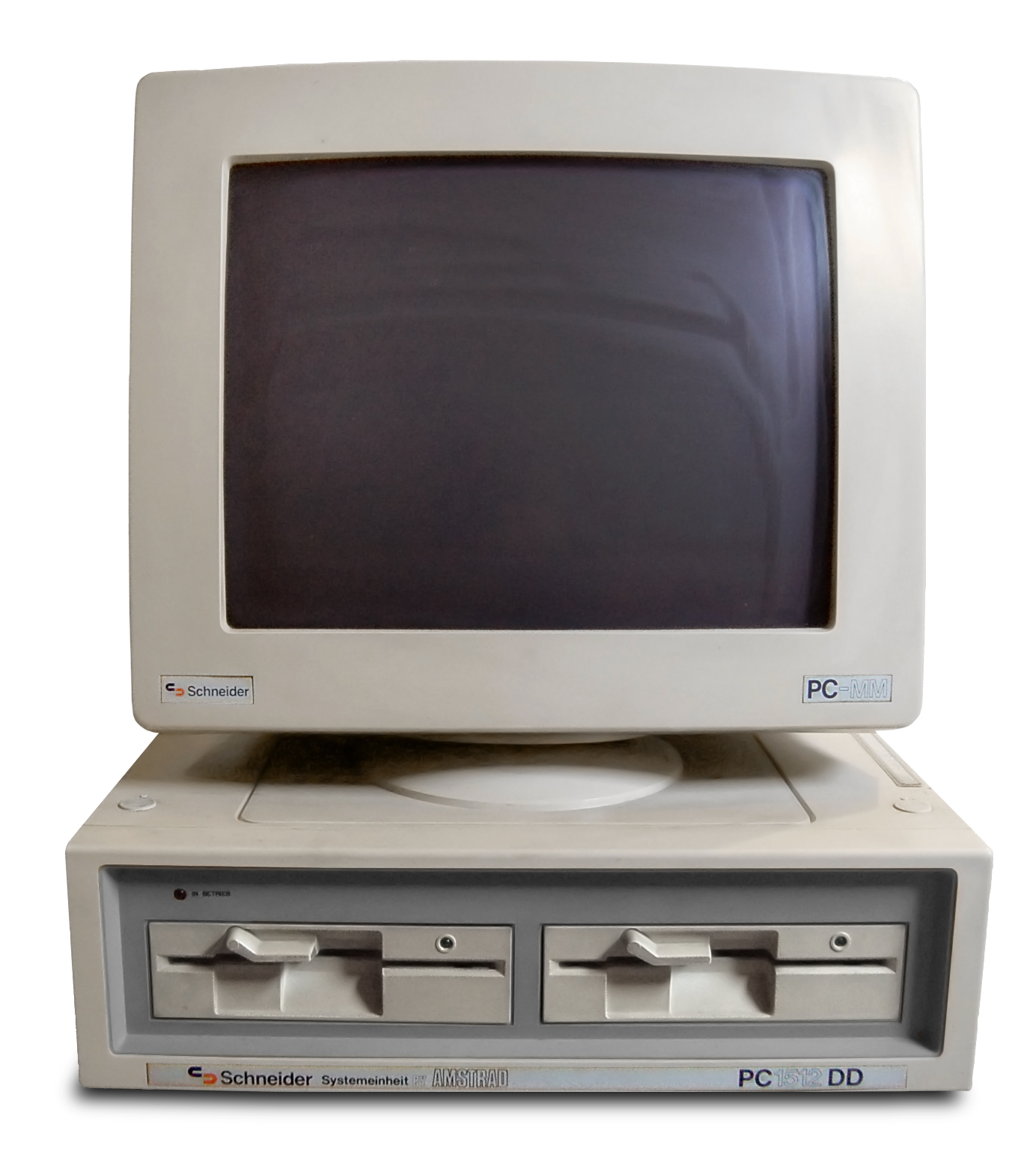
Schneider-badged version of the Amstrad 1512 DD

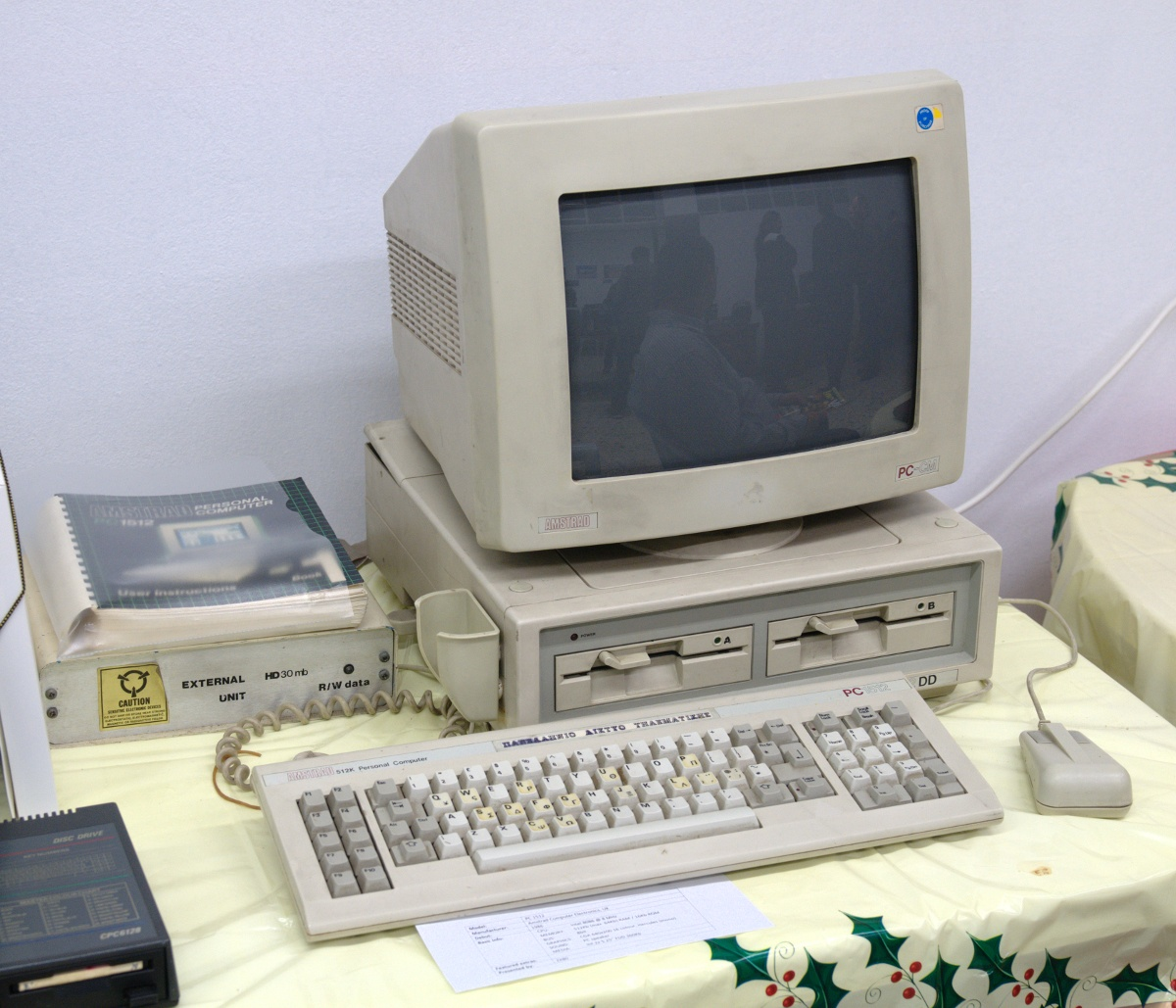
Amstrad PC-1512 DD on display at Retrosystems 2010

General hardware specifications of the PC1512:

- Available as choice of one or two 360 KB 5¼-inch floppy disks drives or one floppy disk drive with a 10 or 20 MB hard disk drive.
- Hard disk version, supplied with an extra floppy disk and manual backup and restore utilities
- PC1512 CGA display with extra 640×200 16 colour mode. PC1640: CGA, EGA, Hercules mode, plus possibility to add an 8-bit ISA VGA board.
- Colour or monochrome monitors. Monochrome monitor displays CGA in greyscale, not compatible with more usual Hercules mono display.
- Motherboard includes RS232c serial and parallel port
- Loudspeaker with volume control (PC speaker, not sound card)
- Battery-backed real-time clock and configuration RAM
- Socket for 8087 math co-processor.
- Connector for light pen
- Full size QWERTY keyboard with Atari joystick port
- Two button mouse with dedicated port on system unit
- Microsoft compatible mouse driver
- Three full-length PC/XT-bus ISA expansion slots – these were accessed through top and side panels with thumb-push locks meaning expansion cards could be added without use of a screwdriver.

== Supplied software ==
Four disks were supplied with floppy models, five with hard drive models.

- Microsoft MS-DOS 3.2 operating system
- Digital Research GEM (Graphics Environment Manager) plus GEM Desktop
- Digital Research GEM Paint
- Digital Research DOS Plus (runs MS-DOS and CP/M-86 applications)
- GEM-based Locomotive BASIC 2

The system was also bundled with the Amstrad PC Games Collection, which included four games: Bruce Lee, The Dam Busters, Tag Team Wrestling and Psi-5 Trading Company. These came on three floppy disks, contained in a plastic clamshell case.

== Dimensions ==
- PC1512SD System Unit 372 W 284 D 135 H 6.05 kg
- PC1512DD System Unit 372 W 284 D 135 H 7.75 kg
- PC MM Monochrome monitor 350W 300 D 315H 7.43 kg
- PC CM Colour Monitor 372W 365D 330H 11.6 kg

== Accessories ==
Printer

Amstrad launched the Amstrad DMP3000 printer, which was an 80-character dot matrix printer with both IBM and Epson compatibility that boasted NLQ (Near Letter Quality) and could handle both A4 and fanfold paper. It connected to the computer via a parallel port.

Modem

Amstrad also launched the SM2400 modem, which was a quad-speed dial-up modem that boasted speeds of up to 2,400 baud. It was an internal ISA modem. It was encased in plastic and could fit into Amstrad PC1512 and PC1640.
