= Sinclair PC200 =

Home computer created by Amstrad

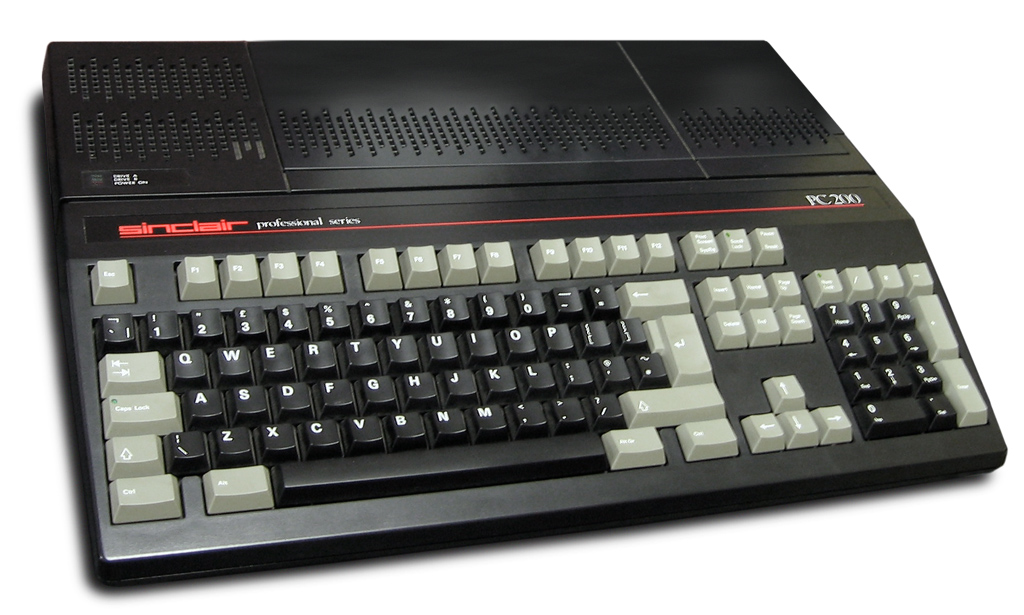
- Sinclair PC 200
- Manufacturer: Amstrad
- Type: Home computer
- Released: 1988; 38 years ago
- Introductory price: £300
- Discontinued: 1988; 38 years ago
- Operating system: MS-DOS 3.3, GEM, PPC Organiser
- CPU: Intel 8086 @ 8 MHz
- Memory: 512KB
- Storage: 3.5" floppy disk drive
- Display: TV modulator; PAL TV; up to 640 × 200
- Graphics: CGA/MDA
- Sound: PC Speaker
- Input: 102-key keyboard with numpad and function keys
- Connectivity: RS-232, Centronics, RGB monitor, mouse port, joystick port
- Backward compatibility: IBM PC compatible
- Predecessor: Amstrad PPC 512

The Amstrad PC20 / Sinclair PC200 was a home computer created by Amstrad in late 1988, based on the Amstrad PPC 512 hardware. The machine was available in two versions, Sinclair PC200 and Amstrad PC20. The PC200 had a black case and 'Sinclair' branding, while the PC20 was white and branded 'Amstrad'.

In addition to MS-DOS 3.3 and PPC Organiser (a memory-resident suite of utilities), the PC20/PC200 was supplied with GEM and four CGA-compatible games.

The limited MDA and CGA graphical capabilities and PC speaker sound output were greatly inferior compared to other home computers of the time. Consequently, the PC20/PC200 was not a commercial success.

== Design ==
The PPC 512's small LCD display was replaced by an RF modulator, so that the machine could display CGA video on a domestic television, and the keyboard and system unit were combined in an integrated case, similar to the original Atari ST and Amiga 500. The PPC 512 second floppy drive bay was replaced by two ISA slots, though the design of the case was such that any cards fitted would protrude from the top of the computer.

Some PC20s omitted the RF modulator and its support circuitry.

Although the PC20/PC200 does not support standard floppy disk drives through the built-in FDD connector, it uses a compatible floppy disk controller (a Zilog Z765a). Standard drives can be made to work with 720K disks after a cable modification.
