= What You See Is What You Get (disambiguation) =

What You See Is What You Get or WYSIWYG is where computer editing software allows content to be edited in a form that resembles its final appearance.

What You See Is What You Get may also refer to:

== Music ==
- What You See Is What You Get (EP), a 1998 EP by Pitchshifter
- What You See Is What You Get (Glen Goldsmith album), 1988
- What You See Is What You Get (Lil' Ed Williams album), 1992
- What You See Is What You Get (Luke Combs album), 2019
- "What You See Is What You Get" (song), a 1971 song by Stoney & Meatloaf
- "What You See Is What You Get", a song by Brenda K. Starr from her 1987 self-titled album
- "What You See Is What You Get", a song by Samantha Fox from her 1991 album Just One Night
- "What U See Is What U Get", a 1998 rap song by Xzibit
- "What U See (Is What U Get)", a song by Britney Spears from her 2000 album Oops!... I Did It Again
- "What You See", a song by Oingo Boingo from their 1981 album Only a Lad
- "What You See Is What You Get", a song by Save Ferris from their 1999 album Modified

== Others ==
- "What you see is what you get", a phrase popularized by Geraldine Jones, a character from the television show The Flip Wilson Show
- What You See Is What You Get (book), a 2010 book written by Alan Sugar

== See also ==
- WYSIWYG (disambiguation)
- Whatcha See Is Whatcha Get (disambiguation)
- "What You Get Is What You See", a song by Tina Turner from her 1987 album Break Every Rule
- What You See Is What You Sweat
