= Heads up =

Heads up may refer to:

== Art, entertainment, and media ==
=== Film ===
- Heads Up (1930 film), an American film directed by Victor Schertzinger
- Heads Up (1925 film), an American silent comedy adventure film

=== Games ===
- Heads up poker, a poker term for play against a single opponent
- Heads Up, Seven Up, a traditional children's game

=== Music ===
==== Groups and labels ====
- Heads Up International, a jazz and African music label

==== Albums and EPs ====
- Heads Up (Bassnectar EP), a 2009 EP by American electronic music artist Bassnectar
- Heads Up (David Newman album), 1987
- Heads Up (Death from Above EP), the 2002 debut recording from the band Death from Above 1979
- Heads Up (The Stems album), a 2007 album by The Stems
- Heads Up (Warpaint album), a 2016 album by Warpaint
- Heads Up! (Blue Mitchell album), 1967
- Heads Up! (Lil' Ed Williams album), 2002

==== Songs ====
- "Heads Up", a song from True & Livin' (2005) by Zion I
- "Heads Up", a song from the iTunes release of Icona Pop (2012) by Icona Pop
- "Heads Up", a song from Time Slip (2019) by Super Junior

=== Stage productions ===
- Heads Up!, a 1929 Broadway musical by Rodgers and Hart

=== Television ===
- Heads Up! (game show), a 2016 American game show based on the video game app from The Ellen DeGeneres Show
- Heads Up, a local kid's game show that was produced & aired on WBAL-TV in Baltimore, MD
- "Heads Up" (The Walking Dead), the seventh episode of the sixth season of the post-apocalyptic drama series The Walking Dead

=== Video games ===
- Heads Up (video game), a video game produced for the Vectrex game console
- Heads Up!, a video game created by The Ellen DeGeneres Show

== Other uses ==
- Head-up display or heads-up display, a transparent display that presents data without obstructing the user's view of objects behind it
