= Get Wild (disambiguation) =

"Get Wild" is a song by The New Power Generation (1994), the backing band of musician Prince

Get Wild may also refer to:

- "Get Wild" (Aaron Carter song), from the album Aaron Carter, 1997
- Get Wild!, a 1999 album by Lil' Ed Williams
- Get Wild (album), by Iranian-American DJ Sharam, 2009
- Get Wild (EP), by Max M, 1992
  - "Get Wild", a track from the EP
- "Get Wild", a song by the Japanese band TM Network, first ending theme of City Hunter anime series, 1987
- "Get Wild", a song by Ansonbean featuring Kayan9896, 2023
