= Young Apprentice =

Television series

- Also known as: Junior Apprentice
- Genre: Reality television series
- Created by: Mark Burnett
- Starring: Lord Sugar; Nick Hewer; Karren Brady
- Narrated by: Mark Halliley
- Theme music composer: Dru Masters
- Opening theme: "Dance of the Knights" by Prokofiev
- Country of origin: United Kingdom
- Original language: English
- No. of series: 3
- No. of episodes: 22

Production
- Running time: 60 minutes
- Production companies: Talkback Thames (2010–2011); Boundless (2012); In association with: Mark Burnett Productions

Original release
- Network: BBC One
- Release: 12 May 2010 – 20 December 2012

Related
- The Apprentice

Young Apprentice is a British reality television series and a spin-off of The Apprentice, in which a group of young people compete against each other in a series of business related challenges to win a £25,000 investment from British business magnate Lord Sugar. In addition to Sugar, he was also joined by his adviser Nick Hewer, and new adviser Karren Brady, prior to her debut on the main show, upon Margaret Mountford's departure from the role in 2009.

Premiering on 12 May 2010, the show ran for three series on both BBC One and BBC HD, before it was cancelled by the BBC, after they decided not to renew it after its third series. The programme was met with mostly positive reviews from critics during its broadcast.

== History ==
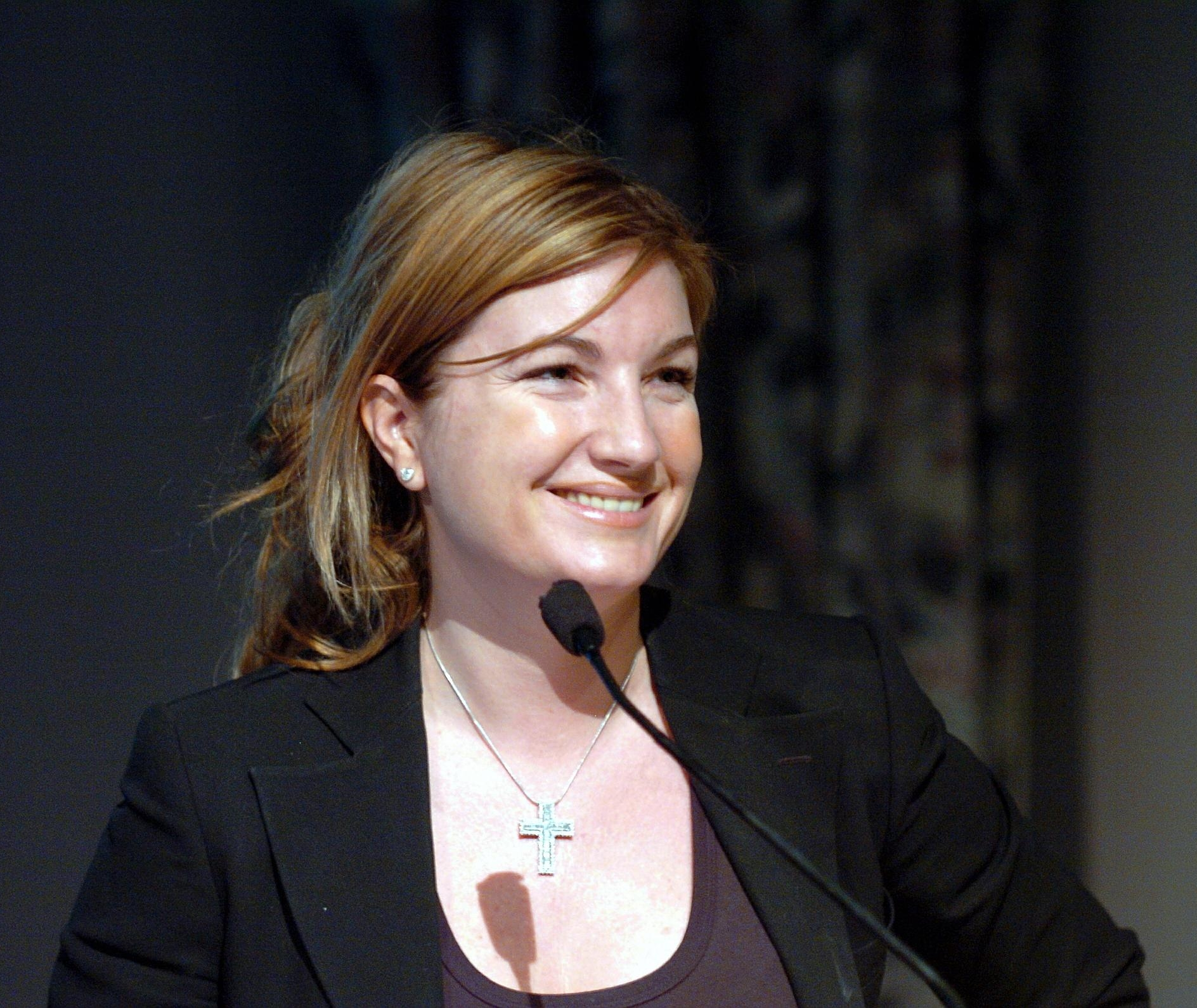
The spin-off marked Karren Brady's debut as Lord Sugar's new adviser, after Margaret Mountford left the role following the fifth series of The Apprentice.

In March 2008, Alan Sugar made an announcement that he intended to propose to the BBC of creating a junior version of The Apprentice owing to its success, with the intention that it would feature children aged between 12–15 and be aired during an early evening timeslot. He later claimed that "nobody took any notice" of his suggestions. A year later, Sugar announced that he had begun negotiations with the BBC in regards to the concept he proposed - this included a focus on the winning team in episodes; a gentler handling of young candidates; the inclusion of his advisers in the spin-off; and airing on BBC One with a similar format structure to that of the main show, though with no use of the Interviews stage of the contest. Official confirmation that the idea had been green-lighted and production was underway on the spin-off, came in the form of announcement made during an episode of The Apprentice: You're Fired! covering the fifth series of the main show, on 20 May 2009, for applicants for the new show. Part of the announcement revealed that the initial concept for the age group of applicants had changed during negotiation, with it now being focused on those between 16–17 years old, from a variety of social and educational backgrounds, with the announcement inviting potential applicants to visit the official The Apprentice website to apply for the spin-off. Sugar remarked that the series, originally announced to be a five-part series, aimed to "promote enterprise amongst young people, as the future of our economy relies on them". In response to this announcement, 28,000 teenagers applied for the show, with ten selected to take part in the competition. After talks about its creation, the show's executive producers were chosen to be Jo Wallace for the BBC, Mark Burnett and C. Scot Cru for Mark Burnett Productions, and Sue Davidson and Michele Kurland for Talkback Thames.

A few months later, Sugar's appointment to be the Labour Party's Enterprise Tsar on 5 June 2009, accompanied by a peerage, led to concerns by the BBC over a conflict of interest in regards to the corporation's political impartiality; while it was decreed that he would continue to appear on The Apprentice and related programming, following discussions on the matter, it was decided to push back the premiere of the spin-off show, dubbed Junior Apprentice, along with the sixth series of the main show, until after the 2010 general election on 6 May 2010. In addition to this, Margaret Mountford's departure from the role of an adviser in The Apprentice, led to Sugar appointing Karren Brady as her replacement, with the decision that she would make her debut in the spin-off. On 3 May 2010, the BBC finally announced the premiere date for the show, which began airing its first series on 12 May 2010.

After concluding its first series, the BBC announced on 28 August 2010 that it had commissioned a second series of the programme, though this came with a few changes - the number of young candidates was increased to twelve, leading to the number of episodes being increased to eight; and the show's title was changed to Young Apprentice. The second series began airing from 24 October 2011; during its broadcast, the BBC commissioned a third series and began conducting applications for it. On 30 August 2012, it was reportedly claimed that Lord Sugar had axed the show due to declining ratings and his desire to concentrate on the main show, but Sugar later stated on his Twitter account that these reports were incorrect, yet he could not confirm how long the spin-off had; the third series eventually began airing a few months later, on 1 November 2012. In February 2013, Lord Sugar posted on his Twitter account that the BBC was cancelling the show, after having debated on its future and decided not to renew it for another series.

== Format ==
While the spin-off's format is very similar to that of The Apprentice, it adopts a more gentle tone with the young candidates, in contrast to the approach given to older candidates on the main show. As with the main show, applicants go through a series of open auditions and interviews, before being whittled down to the final number that will be involved in the competition, which consists of a balanced number of boys and girls. Throughout the process, the candidates, divided into two teams that they at the beginning of the competition, take part in a series of business-related tasks, appointing one member of their team as the project manager (PM), with Lord Sugar having Brady and Hewer overseeing the team's performance on each task, while providing the candidates with an upmarket house/apartment to live in during the competition; unlike the main show, the young candidates do not partake in a series of Interviews in the penultimate stage of the contest.

Once a task is over, the teams return to the boardroom, and go through the same process as in the main show: an initial review of each team's performance is given, followed by a result of their overall effort; the losing team faces a deeper review of their performance; and a final boardroom session is held, with the young candidates involved in it giving reasons and arguments over why they should remain in the process. Unlike the main show, the fired candidate does not get filmed riding a taxi, but instead rides back home in Sugar's limo, and also do not wear an overcoat and carry their suitcase with them when they board the vehicle. The final episode functions in the same manner, with the finalists being able to pick candidates that were eliminated in the contest to be a part of their team and help them to win the contest, with the winner chosen by Lord Sugar; in both the first and third series, the final featured four candidates, and so adopted a similar approach to that of the final episode of the fourth series of The Apprentice, in that they were divided into two teams, with the losing team being fired, before Sugar debated on which of the two in the winning team that he "hired".

== Series 1 (2010) ==
The first series began airing on 12 May 2010. Ten young candidates took part, and the teams were named "Instinct" and "Revolution", with Arjun Rajyagor winning the series.

=== Candidates ===
Candidate	Age	Hometown	Result
Arjun Rajyagor	17	Essex	Winner
Tim Ankers	17	Lancashire	Runner-Up
Kirsty Cleaver	17	Scotland	Fired in the Final
Zoe Plummer	16	London	Fired in the Final
Emma Walker	16	Cheshire	Fired after fifth task
Hannah Cherry	17	Bedfordshire	Fired after fourth task
Rhys Rosser	17	Powys	Fired after third task
Adam Eliaz	17	Newcastle	Quit during third task
Hibah Ansary	16	Manchester	Fired after second task
Jordan De Courcy	16	Republic of Ireland	Fired after first task

==== Performance Chart ====
Task Number
Candidate	1	2	3	4	5	6
Arjun	IN	IN	IN	IN	LOSE	HIRED
Tim	BR	IN	BR	LOSE	IN	RUNNER-UP
Kirsty	IN	IN	IN	BR	WIN	FIRED
Zoe	IN	BR	WIN	IN	BR	FIRED
Emma	IN	IN	IN	WIN	FIRED	
Hannah	IN	WIN	BR	FIRED		
Rhys	BR	IN	FIRED			
Adam	IN	LOSE	LEFT			
Hibah	WIN	FIRED				
Jordan	FIRED					

The candidate won this series of Junior Apprentice.
The candidate was the runner-up.
The candidate won as project manager on his/her team, for this task.
The candidate lost as project manager on his/her team, for this task.
The candidate was on the winning team for this task.
The candidate was on the losing team for this task.
The candidate was brought to the final boardroom for this task.
The candidate was fired in this task.
The candidate lost as project manager and was fired in this task.
The candidate left the competition prior to this task.

=== Episode summary ===
No. overall	No. in series	Title	Original release date	UK viewers (millions)
1	1	"Episode One"	12 May 2010	4.62
Lord Sugar begins a new search for an apprentice, but this time from amongst ten young candidates, putting them through a tough business education which begins with teams focusing on each selling a bulk load of cheese valued at £500 from one of London's street markets. Instinct face problems with identifying and selling their products, wasting time and failing to utilise a unique marketing idea in sales. Revolution sell late after delays in identifying and pricing their cheeses, but soon work hard to sell well. In the boardroom, Revolution win by making a profit, leaving Instinct facing questions over the losses they incurred. Amongst the final three, Jordan De Courcy becomes the first to be fired over his poor sales and lack of team leadership.
2	2	"Episode Two"	19 May 2010	4.34
Teams face the task of creating a new camping product before pitching it to three major retailers to secure orders. Revolution opt for a cardboard-based multi-purpose storage unit that can covert into a games table, which despite a strong pitch, faced criticism over its selling point and strength of material. Instinct opt for a sledge with detachable wheels aimed at festival goers, yet despite criticism over their prototype, the team provide a strong pitch to retailers. In the boardroom, Instinct win by securing orders, leaving Revolution to be questioned over their products dismal failure to receive orders. Amongst the final three, Lord Sugar fires Hibah Ansary for her incompatible personality and pushing the team towards the concept they used.
3	3	"Episode Three"	26 May 2010	5.49
Sugar assigns the candidates to create decorative cupcakes, and then sell their creations from a prime location within London's Selfridges. Revolution opt for a novel "I love..." theme for their cupcakes, managing good sales despite their cupcakes arriving late to their sale site due to issues in their kitchen space. Instinct opt for a fashion theme with personalized message, but suffered problems due to issues with their team leader that forced them to sell hard. In the boardroom, Lord Sugar reveals that Adam Eliaz has left after suffering from illness during the task, before the results reveal that Revolution's themed cupcakes were a good seller, leaving Instinct questioning how they failed. Of the final three, Rhys Rosser is fired for his lack of leadership and for his irrelevant theme for the team's cupcakes.
4	4	"Episode Four"	2 June 2010	4.59
The young candidates find themselves holding an art exhibition, with each team promoting and selling the work of two artists to those attending. Revolution face problems making good negotiations on sales after a slow start, but sell a considerable number of pieces in their exhibition. Instinct struggle with the pieces from their chosen artists, failing to sell expensive pieces and being slow with negotiations on those they make sales on. In the boardroom, Revolution makes greater sales, leaving Instinct to face questions from Lord Sugar over their poor performance. Amongst the final three, Hannah Cherry is dismissed for not demonstrating any notable skills despite the qualifications she provided.
5	5	"Episode Five"	9 June 2010	4.72
Teams head to Amsterdam to choose products from prominent designers, pitching two of these to small stores and two major retailers in hopes of sales. Revolution opt for animal-shaped baby comforters and candle lamps with cutlery sets, yet while one retailer is put off by their pitch, the other and several small stores approve of their choices and make purchases. Instinct opt for accessories for bikes and dog transportation, making great sales with small stores and one retailer, despite the second retailer finding their choices unsuitable for them. In the boardroom, Instinct manage impressive sale figures, leaving Revolution questioned on how they failed the task. Of the final three, Emma Walker is fired for her rude attitude to the designers and proving less appealing than her other team-mates.
6	6	"Episode Six"	10 June 2010	5.42
The final four young candidates find themselves aided by old friends as they devise a new brand of bottled water, including its advertising, before pitching their concept to industry experts. One team opt for a brand of ozonated water, yet their good advertising is undermined by questions over their brand's label and the product itself. The other team opt for new brand of spring water, and while they face issues over their advert and brand logo, they receive positive feedback on their presentation. In the boardroom, the ozonated water is deemed a failure, with Lord Sugar firing Zoe Plummer for her attitude and contributing greatly to the flawed idea, and Kirsty Cleaver for her poor track record in the process and her lack of input in the team's product. Of the remaining two finalists, whose product is deemed a success, Sugar decides that Arjun Rajyagor will be his junior apprentice for his impressive track record, leaving Tim Ankers to become the runner-up for his weak performance during the first half of the process.

== Series 2 (2011) ==
The second series began airing on 24 October 2011. Twelve candidates took part in this series, and the teams were named "Atomic" and "Kinetic", with Zara Brownless winning the series.

=== Candidates ===
Candidate	Age	Hometown	Result
Zara Brownless	16	Hertfordshire	Winner
James McCullagh	17	Derry	Runner-Up
Haya Al Dlame	17	London	Fired after seventh task
Harry Hitchins	16	Brighton	Fired after seventh task
Harry Maxwell	16	Northamptonshire	Fired after seventh task
Lizzie Magee	16	Liverpool	Fired after seventh task
Hayley Forrester	16	Shrewsbury	Fired after sixth task
Gbemi Okunlola	16	London	Fired after fifth task
Lewis Roman	16	Merseyside	Fired after fourth task
Hannah Richards	16	Berkshire	Fired after third task
Ben Fowler	16	Birmingham	Fired after second task
Mahamed Awale	16	Brixton	Fired after first task

==== Performance Chart ====
Task Number
Candidate	1	2	3	4	5	6	7	8
Zara	IN	IN	BR	IN	WIN	BR	IN	HIRED
James	BR	IN	IN	WIN	BR	IN	WIN	RUNNER-UP
Haya	IN	IN	IN	LOSE	IN	WIN	FIRED	
Harry H.	LOSE	IN	IN	IN	IN	IN	FIRED	
Harry M.	IN	BR	BR	IN	LOSE	IN	FIRED	
Lizzie	IN	IN	WIN	IN	IN	LOSE	FIRED	
Hayley	WIN	IN	IN	BR	IN	FIRED		
Gbemi	IN	WIN	IN	IN	FIRED			
Lewis	IN	LOSE	IN	FIRED				
Hannah	IN	IN	FIRED					
Ben	IN	FIRED						
Mahamed	FIRED							

The candidate won this series of Junior Apprentice.
The candidate was the runner-up.
The candidate won as project manager on his/her team, for this task.
The candidate lost as project manager on his/her team, for this task.
The candidate was on the winning team for this task/ in Week 7, they won a place in the Final.
The candidate was on the losing team for this task.
The candidate was brought to the final boardroom for this task.
The candidate was fired in this task.
The candidate lost as project manager and was fired in this task.
The candidate was on the winning team, but was fired in this task.

=== Episode summary ===
No. overall	No. in series	Title	Original release date	UK viewers (millions)
7	1	"Frozen Treats"	24 October 2011	4.62
Lord Sugar begins a new hunt for a young apprentice, putting twelve young candidates through a rigorous business education that begins with them attempting to create a new theme of frozen treats. Atomic opt for a pirate theme, which despite a slow start, sells well thanks to good organisation with production. Kinetic focus on a "treat and trim" theme, yet despite poor disorganisation that reduces the amount they sell, they manage good sales from operating in a favourable location and gambling on a risky pricing strategy. In the boardroom, Kinetic achieve a greater profit than Atomic, leaving the boys to face questions on their performance. Amongst the final three, Mahamed Awale becomes the first to be fired for his lack of contributions and his aggressive manner in the task.
8	2	"Parent and Baby"	31 October 2011	4.76
The teams find themselves creating a new product for the baby and parents market, pitching their concept to three major retailers. Atomic produce a hippo-shaped container for bottles, receiving orders from two retailers for their product despite struggling in some of their pitches. Kinetic produce a support cushion for young babies, but also suffer during pitches, making orders from only one retailer. In the boardroom, Kinetic finds they secure more orders to win, leaving Atomic be questioned over how their concept failed. Of the final three, Ben Fowler is dismissed by Lord Sugar for his weak contributions and his problematic passive nature.
9	3	"Floristry Business"	7 November 2011	4.73
Lord Sugar sends the young candidates to work with flowers, each intending to make profit by selling flowers to the public and through contracts with major clients. Atomic opt for achieving a modest profit margin, securing good sales despite a poor negotiator ruining a potential deal. Kinetic opt for a larger profit margin on sales, which provide a greater margin despite a deal requiring them to reduce prices due to dissatisfaction over their work. In the boardroom, Kinetic are praised for their figures, leaving Atomic to face scrutiny over their performance. Amongst the final three, Hannah Richards is dismissed for failing to bring back those culpable for the team's failure, despite her good leadership on the task.
10	4	"The Over 50s Market"	14 November 2011	4.53
The candidates find themselves heading to an over-50s exhibition, in which each team must attempt to sell two gadgets they have chosen to those visiting. Atomic opt for pie-making machine and a bird house with built-in camera, yet despite difficulties with their first product, the team make good sales with their second choice. Kinetic opt for a handheld vacuum cleaner and a designer shopping trolley, and while suffering difficulties as well, made good sales with the first product thanks to effective promotion of the item to visitors. In the boardroom, Kinetic win the task with high sale figures, leaving Atomic to face questions from Lord Sugar on their performance and choices. Of the final three, Lewis Roman is fired for his lack of pitching and sales skills, and his overall weak track record in the process.
11	5	"Deodorant"	21 November 2011	4.22
Teams are tasked by Lord Sugar to create a new brand of deodorant, complete with can and advert, before pitching their product to industry experts. Atomic opt for a brand called "Raw" aimed at the male market, yet despite weak leadership for the team, their concept was generally well received thanks to a strong presentation. Kinetic opt for a brand called "Vanity" aimed at the female market, but face problems with a difficult team leader, and poor response to expert questions, despite a good advert. In the boardroom, Sugar deems Atomic's concept the winner, leaving Kinetic to face scrutiny over the issues that cost them a win. Amongst the final three, Gbemi Okunlola is fired for poor can design.
12	6	"Discount Buying"	28 November 2011	4.34
The candidates find themselves given ten hours by Lord Sugar to find ten items for ten waxwork pieces, requiring each team to get each for a bargain price. Atomic struggled with poor mistakes that cost them time and led to securing few items on their list, collecting the ones they find with little negotiations. Kinetic suffer from disorganisation to begin with, but manage to secure the items they can find with good negotiations. In the boardroom, the spending totals reveal Kinetic to be the better negotiators, leaving Atomic to face questions on their performance. Of the final three, Hayley Forrester is dismissed for her lack of presence in tasks, and for her overly quiet, polite personality.
13	7	"Popcorn"	5 December 2011	4.62
Lord Sugar tasks each team to produce two new flavours of popcorns, before making orders with three different retailers. Atomic opt for American-inspired flavours, yet despite receiving orders from all three retailers, Kinetic defeat them with their Mediterranean-styled flavours, which secure considerable orders from two retailers. In the boardroom, the final results lead to Sugar firing Harry Hitchins for his poor leadership decisions and pitches, Harry Maxwell for his poor track record and lack of standout skills, and Lizzie Magee for promoting a generic brand and not pitching for the team. With only two places in the final, he decides to dismiss from the winning team Haya Al Dlame for their lack of presence on the task, leaving James McCullagh and Zara Brownless heading for the final.
14	8	"The Final"	12 December 2011	4.91
In their final challenge, the two finalists work to create a new concept of video game to pitch to industry experts, including a viral advert, receiving help from old friends to develop their ideas. James opts for an office-based game, which proves popular with experts and a potential for making revenue with add-ons. Zara opt for a game involving a pig trying to escape an evil butcher, with their concept being well received by experts, notably for the potential for merchandising. In the boardroom, Lord Sugar is forced to decide between the two based on their responses to his question of their futures, with him making Zara Brownless his young apprentice for her track record, and her strong business plan for the future, leaving James McCullagh becoming the runner-up due to his weak plans for the prize being offered.

== Series 3 (2012) ==
The third and final series began airing on 1 November 2012. Twelve candidates took part, and the teams were named "Odyssey" and "Platinum", with Ashleigh Porter-Exley winning the series.

=== Candidates ===
Candidate	Age	Hometown	Result
Ashleigh Porter-Exley	17	South Yorkshire	Winner
Lucy Beauvallet	16	East Sussex	Runner-Up
Maria Doran	17	Belfast	Fired in the Final
Patrick McDowell	16	Merseyside	Fired in the Final
Andrew Tindall	16	West Yorkshire	Fired after seventh task
Steven Cole	17	Kent	Fired after seventh task
Navdeep Bual	16	Essex	Fired after sixth task
David Odhiambo	17	Bedfordshire	Fired after fifth task
Alice Smith	17	Leicestershire	Fired after fourth task
Amy Corrigan	17	London	Fired after third task
Sean Spooner	16	Northamptonshire	Fired after second task
Maximillian "Max" Grodecki	16	Kent	Fired after first task

==== Performance Chart ====
Elimination Chart
Candidate	1	2	3	4	5	6	7	8
Ashleigh	WIN	IN	IN	IN	LOSE	IN	IN	HIRED
Lucy	IN	WIN	IN	IN	IN	IN	LOSE	RUNNER-UP
Maria	IN	BR	IN	BR	IN	WIN	IN	FIRED
Patrick	LOSE	IN	IN	IN	IN	IN	WIN	FIRED
Andrew	IN	IN	WIN	IN	BR	LOSE	FIRED	
Steven	IN	IN	LOSE	IN	IN	BR	FIRED	
Navdeep	IN	IN	IN	BR	WIN	FIRED		
David	BR	BR	BR	WIN	FIRED			
Alice	IN	IN	IN	FIRED				
Amy	IN	IN	FIRED					
Sean	IN	FIRED						
Max	FIRED							

The candidate won this series of Junior Apprentice.
The candidate was the runner-up.
The candidate won as project manager on his/her team, for this task.
The candidate lost as project manager on his/her team, for this task.
The candidate was on the winning team for this task.
The candidate was on the losing team for this task.
The candidate was brought to the final boardroom for this task.
The candidate was fired in this task.
The candidate lost as project manager and was fired in this task.

=== Episode summary ===
No. overall	No. in series	Title	Original release date	UK viewers (millions)
15	1	"Rags to Riches"	1 November 2012	4.44
Lord Sugar begins a new search for a young apprentice amongst twelve young candidates, and gives them their first task - to choose clothing from those discarded by others and make a profit from their choices. Odyssey focus on customising their choices for sale, yet face problems from a difficult team leader that lead to poor decisions over the sale of their stock. Platinum lead a more organised performance, which despite struggling with the choices they make, sell well thanks to productive team members. In the boardroom, Platinum win with a commendable profit, leaving Odyssey to face scrutiny over their efforts. Amongst the final three, Maximillian "Max" Grodecki is the first to be fired for contributing few sales, and for not proving his worth with his academic qualifications.
16	2	"Cookery Book"	8 November 2012	4.34
The teams find themselves tasked with creating their own cookery book, which they then have to pitch to three retailers in hopes of securing orders. Odyssey opt for a book aimed at providing recipes for professional women, which receives strong criticism by the retailers for the design of its cover, despite the professional effort to its content. Platinum opt for a book aimed at those leaving home for the first time, yet while the team face problems with argumentative members and producing a concept with spelling mistakes, receive praise from strong pitches and incorporating it with social media. In the boardroom, Platinum secure significant orders from all three retailers, which leave Odyssey questioning how their concept failed. Amongst the final three, Lord Sugar dismisses Sean Spooner for his poor leadership and weak decisions in the task.
17	3	"Theatre Props"	15 November 2012	4.07
Lord Sugar gives each team a list of ten items wanted by the Coliseum Theatre, requiring them to get each for a bargain price. Odyssey start late after conducting research, but manage to secure half of the required purchases with good negotiations for discounts. Platinum manage to secure reasonable discounts on some of their purchases, but suffered from infighting amongst some members, missing out on expensive pieces and failing to return on time by the deadline. Total spends revealed in the boardroom prove that Odyssey negotiated and performed well, leaving Platinum to be questioned on the mistakes they made. Of the final three, Amy Corrigan is fired for her behaviour on the task, her refusal to accept any criticism against her, and her unimpressive performance in the process.
18	4	"Afternoon Tea"	22 November 2012	4.04
Each team is tasked with running their own afternoon tea business at a stately home, aiming to manage costs and thus make a good profit. Odyssey opt for a business with a 1940s theme and premium prices, yet while they perform well, arguments on their pricing strategy and discounts cause problems to attract customers. Platinum opt for a business themed around the Mad Hatter's tea party and offering cheap pricing, yet while they suffered from a weak leader and the team falling into chaos with customers being made to wait much longer than preferred, they managed to offer a smooth service overall and achieve good sales. Platinum achieve a better profit than Odyssey, leaving the losing team facing the boardroom. Amongst the final three, Alice Smith is forced to leave after failing to control costs on the task and listen to market research properly, along with offering a confusing theme.
19	5	"Kids Club"	29 November 2012	4.11
The young candidates find themselves creating their own children's club experience, with each team seeking to promote their concept and secure orders from holiday providers. Odyssey focus on a club themed around science lessons with creativity, yet faced questions over their club's financial figures and its commercial viability. Platinum focus on a club themed around children using their bodies for painting, but faced issues from a difficult team leader overruling other alternatives suggested over an idea considered lacking innovation. In the boardroom, Odyssey win the task with a sizeable sum of orders, leaving Platinum to question the weak sales they made. Of the final three, David Odhiambo is fired for failing to strongly oppose the chosen theme and his weak track record in the process.
20	6	"Hair Product"	6 December 2012	4.30
Teams must create a brand new hair product, complete with advertising campaign, before pitching their concept to industry experts. Odyssey opt for a brand of hair gel called "Chameleon", but face questions over the concept's efforts to stand out not matching the brand's name and the advert to promote it. Platinum opt for a tacky style of hairspray called "Strexy", yet despite questions on their advertising, were praised for its general concept design. In the boardroom, Lord Sugar deems Platinum the winner for their concept, leaving Odyssey being questioned over their failed campaign and confusing concept. Amongst the final three, Navdeep Bual is dismissed for her lack of contributions on the task and being deemed not likely to do well in the world of business.
21	7	"Festival"	13 December 2012	4.16
In the penultimate task, teams must each chose two items to sell during a music festival. Odyssey opt for novelty onesies and a pedal-powered washing machine, but struggled with making sales, failing to sell their second product throughout the task. Platinum opt for a novelty umbrella and cardboard toilet, but despite difficulties with selling their choices, they manage to make marginal sales in the task. In the boardroom, Platinum manage to win with a marginal gap in sale figures, with Odyssey facing scrutiny on their performance. Amongst the losing team, Lord Sugar fires Steven Cole for his poor sales skills, not using his festival experience, and his weak defensive arguments, and dismisses Andrew Tindall for making no sales and his weak track record in the process.
22	8	"Sportswear"	20 December 2012	4.58
The final four candidates are split into pairs running their own team consisting of old friends, as they attempt create a new sports brand, complete with advertising, and promote it to industry experts. One team opts for a cycling-based brand, yet while their brand is praised for tapping a potential market, their advertising is criticised for having little relevance on the concept. The other team opt for a dance-themed brand, which receives good feedback on their advertising and long-term plans for their concept, despite questions on their costs and target market. In the boardroom, Lord Sugar deems the cycling-brand a failure, firing Patrick McDowell for the campaign's flawed advertising, and Maria Doran for her dominance on the creative process and her lack of co-operation with her team members. Of the winning team, Sugar decides to make Ashleigh Porter-Exley his new young apprentice, for being the strongest candidate throughout the process, leaving Lucy Beauvallet becoming the runner-up for her quiet, weak personality.

== Reception ==
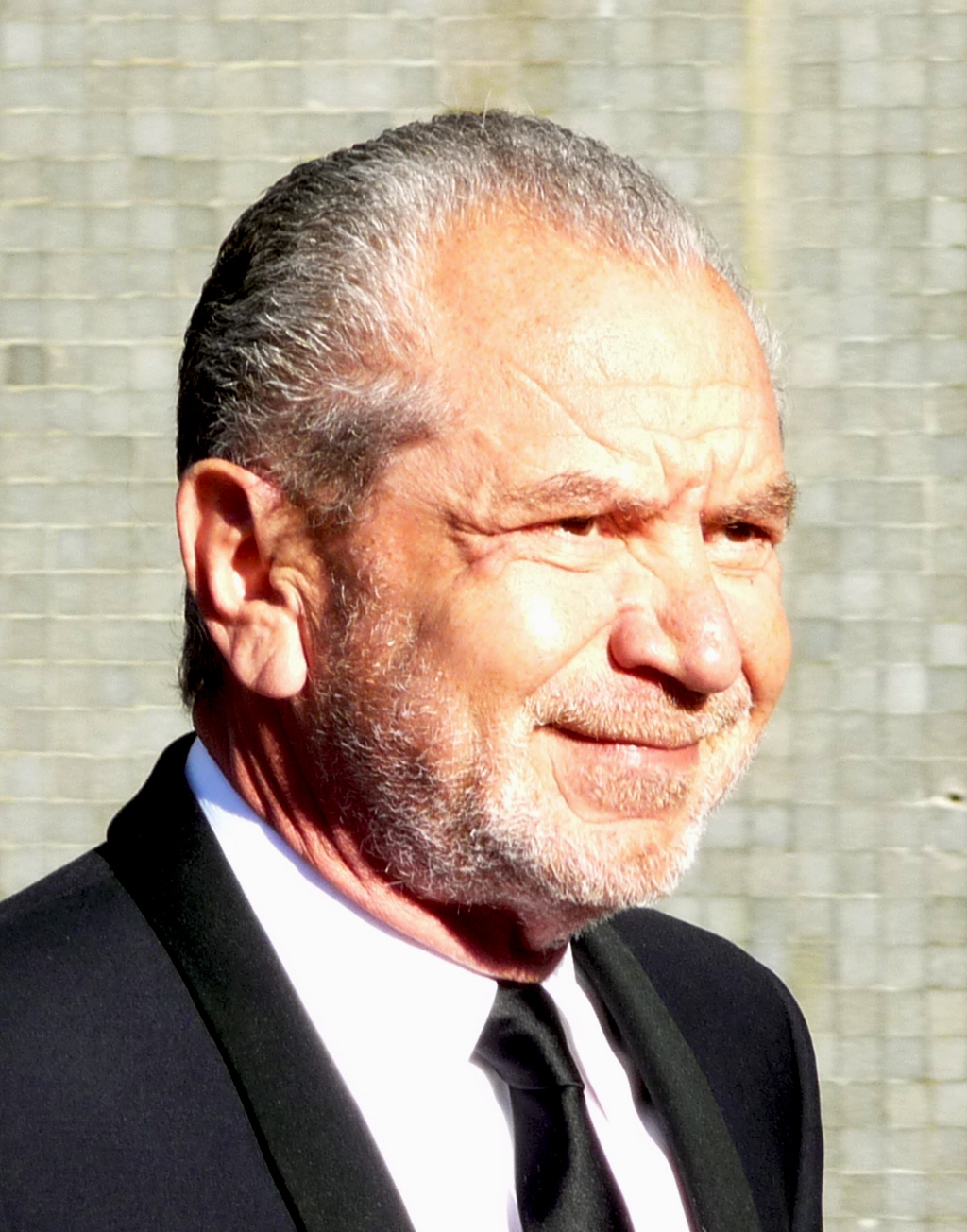
One critic argued that Sugar's soft approach towards the younger participants was "unnatural".

=== Critical response ===
Young Apprentice received a generally positive response from critics. Writing for The Guardian, Tim Lusher was complimentary of the programme's tone by claiming that "for once, even the losers look as if they could be winners one day" and Alex Fletcher of Digital Spy said that from the opening minutes of the first episode it was clear that "this spinoff series isn't going to be any softer or less entertaining than the original". The Daily Telegraph's Benji Wilson also praised the series and argued that it "had all of the staggering self-regard and dim-witted hilarity we have come to expect from the contestants on the grown-up Apprentice". The online version of Heat magazine, heatworld.com, praised the series and said that it was "amazing...might just be the best show we’ve seen all year", while The Guardian's Johnny Dee claimed that the programme was of better quality than its adult counterpart and proved that reality television "doesn't have to be nasty to be entertaining".

Despite branding it as "compelling", John Crace of The Guardian claimed that the programme "gave us a first glimpse of the nightmare possibilities of Cameron Youth" and claimed that Sugar's softer approach to the young candidates came across as "unnatural". As well as the character of Zoe Plummer, also seen to be unnatural. In The Independent, Tom Sutcliffe suggested that the sight of crying teenagers would leave the audience feeling uncomfortable. Shortly before the programme started, both the National Federation of Enterprise Agencies and the Institute of Directors criticised the programme's lack of relevancy to business; the former argued that the BBC should instead be focusing on some of Britain's four million small businesses and the latter claimed that the programme should be more informative instead of "entertainment masquerading as business".

In September 2012, it was announced that Young Apprentice was nominated for the 18th National Television Awards in the category Factual Entertainment.

== Transmissions ==
Series	Start date	End date	Episodes
1	12 May 2010	10 June 2010	6
2	24 October 2011	12 December 2011	8
3	1 November 2012	20 December 2012	8

== Ratings ==
Episode viewing figures from BARB.

=== Series 1 ===
Episode No.	Airdate	Total Viewers	BBC One Weekly Ranking
1	12 May 2010	4,620,000	22
2	19 May 2010	4,340,000	23
3	26 May 2010	5,490,000	8
4	2 June 2010	4,590,000	11
5	9 June 2010	4,720,000	16
6	10 June 2010	5,420,000	8

=== Series 2 ===
Episode No.	Airdate	Total Viewers	BBC One Weekly Ranking
1	24 October 2011	4,740,000	19
2	31 October 2011	4,760,000	24
3	7 November 2011	4,730,000	25
4	14 November 2011	Under 4,530,000	Outside Top 30
5	21 November 2011	Under 4,220,000	Outside Top 30
6	28 November 2011	4,340,000	29
7	5 December 2011	4,610,000	28
8	12 December 2011	4,910,000	23

=== Series 3 ===
Episode No.	Airdate	Total Viewers	BBC One Weekly Ranking
1	1 November 2012	4,440,000	28
2	8 November 2012	4,340,000	27
3	15 November 2012	4,070,000	29
4	22 November 2012	Under 4,040,000	Outside Top 30
5	29 November 2012	Under 4,110,000	Outside Top 30
6	6 December 2012	Under 4,300,000	Outside Top 30
7	13 December 2012	Under 4,160,000	Outside Top 30
8	20 December 2012	4,580,000	27
