= Amshold =

Holding company

Amshold Group Limited
- Type: Private limited company
- Founded: 1999
- Headquarters: Loughton, Essex, United Kingdom
- Key people: Alan Sugar, Chairman
- Website: amshold.com

Amshold Group Limited is Alan Sugar's private holding company. The company is responsible for all of Alan Sugar's private companies and companies formed in partnership with Alan Sugar as a result of the UK TV show The Apprentice.

In March 2013 the company's headquarters won a Building Design Award. James Hughes, Property Genius for Amshold Group Limited received the award on behalf of the company.

== Daughter companies ==
- Amsprop
- Amsair
- Amscreen
- Amshold Securities
- Amstar Media
- AvenTOM
- Hyper Recruitment Solutions
- Dr Leah Clinics & Skin Care

== Employment tribunal ==
In May 2013 Amshold was cleared of a constructive dismissal claim brought by Stella English, winner of the sixth series of The Apprentice. In the ruling it was stated the case was: "a claim which should never have been brought."

In June 2013 it was reported that Alan Sugar was suing Stella English for £35,000 "to recover costs". Later that year the East London Tribunal Service ruled that English would not be required to pay any of the costs, which by then had grown to £50,000.
