= WYSIWYG (disambiguation) =

WYSIWYG (what you see is what you get) is a type of software.

WYSIWYG may also refer to:

- WYSIWYG (album), a 2000 album by Chumbawamba
- WYSIWYG (TV series), a 1990s CITV series
- "WYSIWYG", an instrumental by rock band Clutch from the 2004 album Blast Tyrant
- "W.Y.S.I.W.Y.G.", a track by Pitchshifter off the 1998 album www.pitchshifter.com

== See also ==
- Wizzywig, an American comic book series by Ed Piskor
- What You See Is What You Get (disambiguation)
- Whatcha See Is Whatcha Get (disambiguation)
