= Alan Sugar =

British business and TV personality (born 1947)

The Right Honourable The Lord Sugar
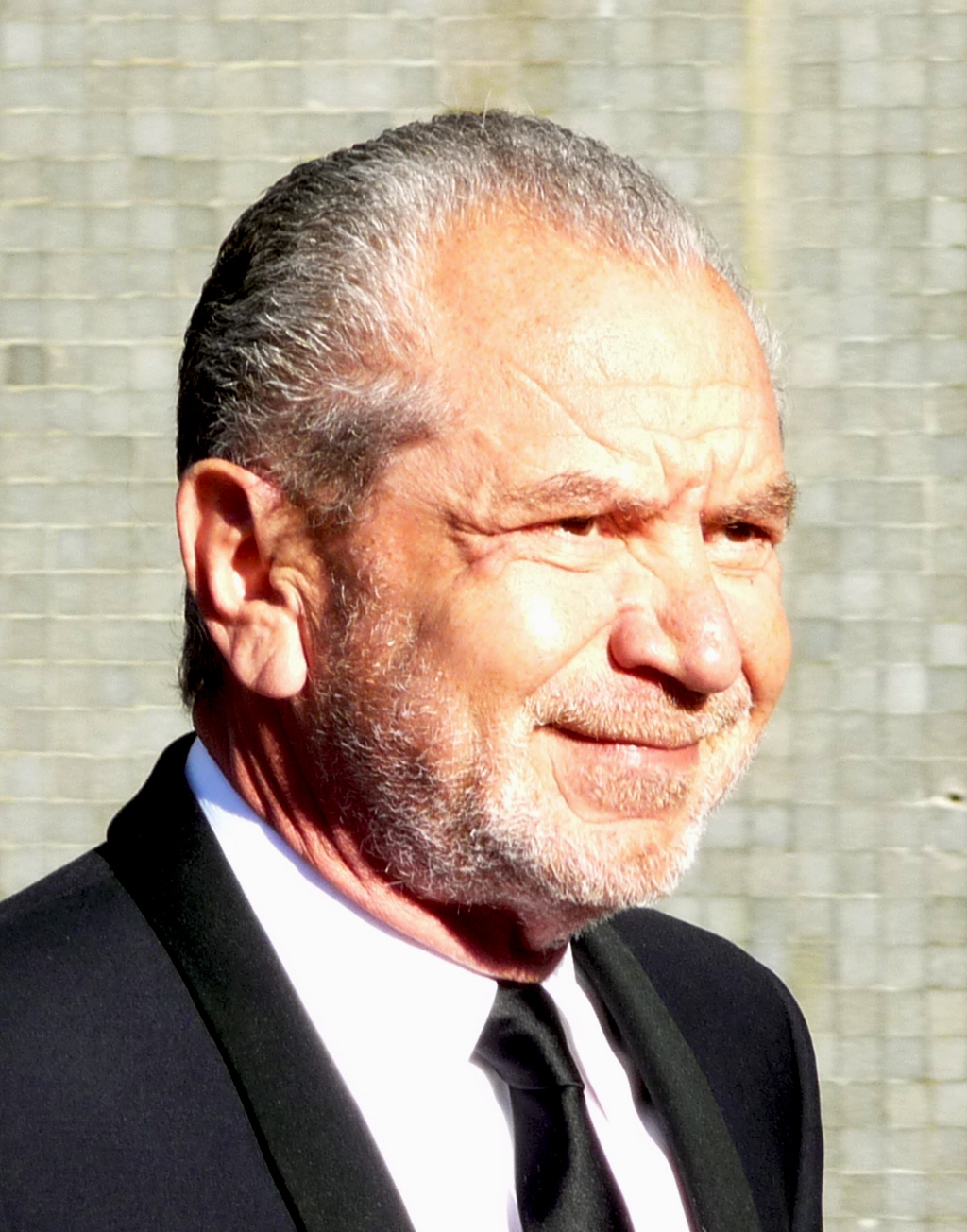
- Sugar at the 2009 BAFTAs

Enterprise Champion to the Business Secretary
- In office 25 May 2016 – 24 July 2019
- Prime Minister: David Cameron; Theresa May
- Business Secretary: Sajid Javid; Greg Clark
- In office 5 June 2009 – 11 May 2010
- Prime Minister: Gordon Brown
- Business Secretary: Peter Mandelson

Member of the House of Lords
- Lord Temporal
- Life peerage 20 July 2009

Personal details
- Born: Alan Michael Sugar; 24 March 1947 (age 79) Clapton, Hackney, England
- Party: None (crossbencher) (2017–present)
- Other political affiliations: None (non-affiliated) (2015–2017); Labour (1997–2015)
- Spouse: Ann Simons (m. 1968)
- Children: 3
- Relatives: Rita Simons (niece)
- Occupation: Business magnate; media personality; author; politician; political advisor

Alan Michael Sugar, Baron Sugar (born 24 March 1947) is a British businessman, entrepreneur and television personality.

Sugar began consumer electronics company Amstrad, in 1968. In 2007, he sold his remaining interest in the company in a deal to BSkyB for £125 million. He was also the chairman and part-owner of Tottenham Hotspur Football Club from 1991 to 2001, selling his remaining stake in the club in 2007 for £25 million. According to the Sunday Times Rich List, Sugar became a billionaire in 2015. In 2021, his fortune was estimated at £1.21bn, ranking him as the 138th-richest person in the UK.

Sugar is the host and "boss" of the BBC Television reality competition series The Apprentice, which has been broadcast since 2005. He also assumed the role for The Celebrity Apprentice Australia for Australia's Nine Network in 2021 and 2022.

Sugar was elevated to the House of Lords in 2009 as a Labour peer and was one of the party's biggest donors, but left the party in 2015 and subsequently expressed support for the Conservative Party. He has served as the British government's enterprise champion from 2009 to 2010 and again since 2016, responsible for promoting entrepreneurship and advising the Department for Business and Trade.

== Early life ==
Alan Michael Sugar was born on 24 March 1947 in Clapton, Hackney, East London, into a Jewish family. His father, Nathan, was a tailor in the garment industry of the East End. His maternal grandparents were born in Russia, and his paternal grandfather was born in Poland. Sugar's paternal grandmother, Sarah Sugar, was born in London to Polish parents.

When Sugar was young, his family lived in a council flat. Because of his profuse, curly hair, he was nicknamed "Mop head", a name that he still goes by in the present day. He attended Northwold Primary School and then Brooke House Secondary School in Upper Clapton, Hackney, and made extra money by working at a greengrocers. After leaving school at the age of 16, he worked briefly for the civil service as a statistician at the Ministry of Education.

== Amstrad ==
In 1968, aged 21, Sugar set up Amstrad with £100 of Post Office savings. He started off selling radio aerials for cars and other electrical goods out of a van which he had bought for £50 and insured for £8.

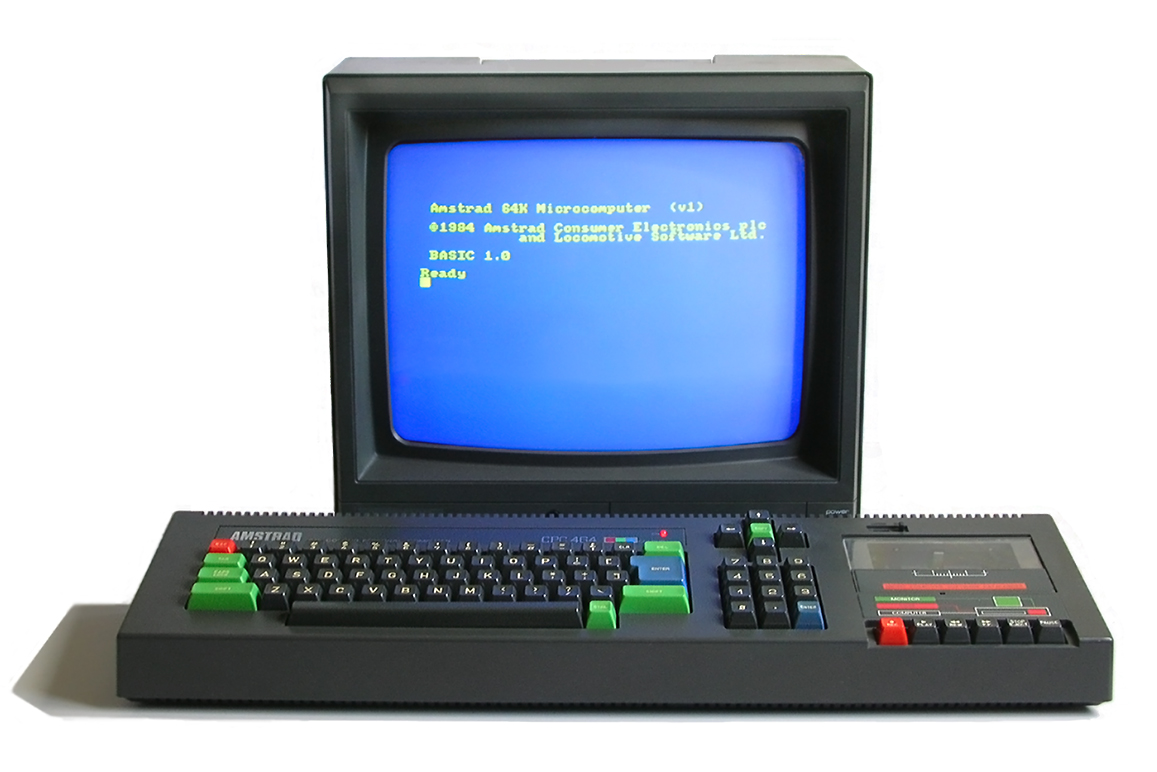
Amstrad's CPC 464 personal computer

The name of the company was formed from his initials and the first four letters of the word 'trading': Alan Michael Sugar Trading. It began as a general importer/exporter and wholesale; by 1970 the first manufacturing venture was underway. He achieved lower production prices by using injection moulding plastics for hi-fi turntable covers, severely undercutting competitors who used vacuum-forming processes. In the mid 1970s manufacturing capacity was expanded to include the production of audio amplifiers, stereo cassette recording decks and AM/FM radio tuners, on most cases beating the competition on price.

In 1980, Amstrad was listed on the London Stock Exchange and during the 1980s Amstrad doubled its profit and market value every year. By 1984, recognising the opportunity of the home computer era, Amstrad launched an 8-bit machine, the Amstrad CPC 464. Although the CPC range were attractive machines, with CP/M-capability and a good BASIC interpreter, it had to compete with its arch-rivals, the more graphically complex Commodore 64 and the popular Sinclair ZX Spectrum, not to mention the highly sophisticated BBC Micro. Despite this, three million units were sold worldwide with a long production life of eight years. It inspired an East German version with Z80 clone processors. In 1985, Sugar had another major breakthrough with the launch of the Amstrad PCW 8256 word processor which retailed at over £300, but was still considerably cheaper than rival machines (such as the Apple Macintosh Plus, which retailed at $2,599). In 1986, Amstrad bought the rights to the Sinclair computer product line and produced two more ZX Spectrum models in a similar style to their CPC machines. It also developed the PC1512, a PC compatible computer, which became quite popular in Europe and was the first in a line of Amstrad PCs.

In 1988, Stewart Alsop II called Sugar and Jack Tramiel "the world's two leading business-as-war entrepreneurs". The 1990s proved a difficult time for the company. The launch of a range of business PCs was marred by unreliable hard disks (supplied by Seagate), causing high levels of customer dissatisfaction and damaging Amstrad's reputation in the personal computer market, from which it never recovered. Subsequently, Seagate was ordered to pay Amstrad $153 million in damages for lost revenue. This was later reduced by $22 million in an out of court settlement. In the early 1990s, Amstrad began to focus on portable computers rather than desktop computers. Also, in 1990, Amstrad entered the gaming market with the GX4000, but it was a commercial failure, largely because there was only a poor selection of games available. Additionally, it was immediately superseded by the Japanese consoles: Mega Drive and Super NES, which both had a much more comprehensive selection of games. In 1993, Amstrad released the PenPad, a PDA, and bought into Betacom and Viglen in order to focus more on telecommunications rather than computers. Amstrad released the first of its combined telephony and e-mail devices, called the e-m@iler, followed by the e-m@ilerplus in 2002, neither of which sold in great volume.

On 31 July 2007, it was announced that broadcaster BSkyB had agreed to buy Amstrad for about £125m. At the time of the takeover, Sugar commented that he wished to play a part in the business, saying: "I turn 60 this year and I have had 40 years of hustling in the business, but now I have to start thinking about my team of loyal staff, many of whom have been with me for many years." On 2 July 2008 it was announced that Sugar was standing down from Amstrad as chairman, to focus on his other business interests.

== Tottenham Hotspur ==
After a take-over battle with Robert Maxwell for ownership of Tottenham Hotspur, Sugar teamed up with the club's manager Terry Venables and bought it in June 1991. Although his initial investment helped ease the financial troubles the club was suffering at the time, his treatment of Tottenham as a business venture and not a footballing one made him an unpopular figure among the club's fans. In Sugar's nine years as chairman, Tottenham Hotspur did not finish in the top six in the league and won just one trophy, the 1999 League Cup.

After being sacked as the club's chief executive by Sugar in 1993, Venables appealed to the high courts for reinstatement. A legal battle for the club took place over the summer, which Sugar won (see Re Tottenham Hotspur plc [1994] 1 BCLC 655). The decision to sack Venables angered many Tottenham fans, and Sugar later said, "I felt as though I'd killed Bambi."

In 1992, Sugar was the only representative of the then "big five" (Arsenal, Everton, Liverpool, Manchester United and Tottenham Hotspur) who voted in favour of Sky's bid for Premier League television rights. The other four voted in favour of ITV's bid, as it had promised to show big five games more often. At the time of the vote, Sugar's company Amstrad was developing satellite dishes for Sky, though Sugar had declared this prior to the vote. During negotiations, Sugar called Sky CEO Sam Chisholm and angrily ordered him to "blow [ITV] out of the water" with a much higher bid.

In 1994, Sugar financed the transfers of three players of the 1994 FIFA World Cup: Ilie Dumitrescu, Gica Popescu, and Jürgen Klinsmann, who in his first season in English football, was named FWA Footballer of the Year. Because Spurs had not qualified for European competition, Klinsmann decided to invoke an opt-out clause in his contract and left for Bayern Munich in the summer of 1995. Sugar appeared on television holding the last shirt Klinsmann wore for Spurs and said he would "not wash his car with it". He referred to foreigners coming into the Premier League at high wages as "Carlos Kickaballs". Klinsmann retaliated by calling Sugar "a man without honour", and said:

"He only ever talks about money. He never talks about the game. I would say there is a big question mark over whether Sugar's heart is in the club and in football. The big question is what he likes more, the business or the football?"

Klinsmann re-signed for Tottenham on loan in December 1997.

In October 1998, former Tottenham striker Teddy Sheringham released his autobiography, in which he cited Sugar as the reason he left the club in 1997. He said that Sugar had accused him of feigning injury during a long spell on the sidelines during the 1993–94 season. He further stated that Sugar had refused to give him the five-year contract he wanted, as he had not believed Sheringham would still get into the Tottenham team when he was 36. Sheringham returned to Tottenham after his spell at Manchester United and continued to start for the first team until he was released in the summer of 2003, at age 37. Sheringham said that Sugar "lacked ambition" and was hypocritical. As an example, Sugar asked him for recommendations of players; when Sheringham suggested England midfielder Paul Ince, Sugar refused because he did not want to spend £4 million on a player who would soon be 30. After Sheringham left Spurs, Sugar approved the signing of Les Ferdinand, aged 31, for a club record £6 million, on higher wages than Sheringham had wanted.

Sugar appointed seven managers in his time at Spurs. The first was Peter Shreeves, who replaced Venables in 1991, followed by the dual management team of Doug Livermore and Ray Clemence in 1992, former Spurs midfielder Osvaldo Ardiles in 1993, and Gerry Francis in 1994. In 1997, Sugar surprised the footballing world by appointing the relatively unknown Swiss manager Christian Gross. Gross lasted nine months as Spurs finished in 14th place in 1998, and began the next season with just three points from their opening three games. Sugar next appointed George Graham, a former player and manager of bitter rivals Arsenal. Although Graham won Spurs' first trophy in eight years, fans never warmed to him, partly because of his Arsenal connection, and disliked the negative, defensive style of football which he had Spurs playing; fans believed it was not the "Tottenham way".

In February 2001, after speculation and confirmation on 11 December 2000, Sugar sold his majority stake at Tottenham to leisure group ENIC, selling 27% of the club for £22 million. In June 2007, he sold his 12% remaining shares to ENIC for £25 million, ending his 16-year association with the club. He described his time at Tottenham as "a waste of my life". Sugar later donated £3 million from the proceeds of the sale of his interests in Tottenham Hotspur to the refurbishment of the Hackney Empire in his native East End of London.

== The Apprentice ==
Sugar became the host of the BBC reality show The Apprentice, which has had one series broadcast each year from 2005, in the same role as Donald Trump in the US version. He fires at least one candidate each week until only one candidate is left. Until 2010, the winner was then employed in his company and since 2011 wins a partnership with Sugar, including his investment of £250,000 to establish their own business.

As a condition for appearing in the third series, Sugar placed a requirement that the show be more business-oriented rather than just entertainment and that he should be portrayed in a less harsh light, to counter his somewhat belligerent reputation. He also expressed a desire that the calibre of the candidates should be higher than those who had appeared in the second series (who had come across as manifestly lacklustre) and that the motives of the candidates for participating are scrutinised more carefully, given that certain candidates in previous series had used their successful experience in the show as a springboard to advance their own careers (as occurred with Michelle Dewberry, the winner of the second series, who left Amstrad's employment only eight months after taking up the job). In September 2013, Sugar lost his Employment tribunal counter-claim against Stella English, the 2010 winner of The Apprentice.

Sugar has criticised the US version of The Apprentice because "they've made the fatal error of trying to change things just for the sake of it and it backfired."

=== The Celebrity Apprentice Australia ===
In September 2020, it was announced that Sugar will be the new CEO on The Celebrity Apprentice Australia on Australia's Nine Network, replacing former CEO Mark Bouris.

=== Young Apprentice ===
Young Apprentice (Junior Apprentice in series 1) was a British reality television programme spin-off in which a group of twelve young people, aged 16 and 17, competed to win a £25,000 prize from Sugar. The six-part series began on BBC One and BBC HD on 12 May 2010, and concluded on 10 June. It featured Nick Hewer and Karren Brady as Sugar's advisors. Brady made her debut on Junior Apprentice; it aired before she appeared on the adult version. The programme concluded with Sugar awarding the prize fund to 17-year-old Arjun Rajyagor. Tim Ankers finished in second place.

The second series started in October 2011, and featured eight episodes and twelve contestants. The series was won by Zara Brownless, with James McCullough as runner-up.

Originally proposed in March 2008 and confirmed in June 2009, Junior Apprentice received mostly positive reviews from critics. Sugar's role under Gordon Brown's government sparked a debate over the BBC's political impartiality regulations in the run-up to the UK 2010 election, resulting in both Junior Apprentice and the sixth regular edition of The Apprentice being delayed.

=== Other television appearances ===
In May 2008, Sugar made an appearance on An Audience Without Jeremy Beadle to pay tribute to Jeremy Beadle as they were close friends and both appeared on a celebrity special of Who Wants to Be a Millionaire? in 2005.

In January 2009, Fiona Bruce presented a BBC Two documentary entitled The Real Sir Alan. Also in 2009, Sugar appeared in television advertisements for investment bank NS&I and The Learning and Skills Council talking about apprenticeships.

In May 2011, he presented Lord Sugar Tackles Football, a documentary looking into the financial woes of English football.

In September 2012, Sugar appeared as himself in a cameo in the Doctor Who episode "The Power of Three". Sugar's cameo was filmed on the set of The Apprentice.

In November 2012, he appeared as himself in a cameo in a special episode of EastEnders for Children in Need.

== Other ventures ==
=== Amsair ===
Amsair Executive Aviation was founded in 1993, and is run by Sugar's son Daniel. As with Amstrad, the name Amsair is an acronym taken from the initials of Sugar's name "Alan Michael Sugar Air." Amsair operates a large Cessna fleet, and one Embraer Legacy 650 with the registration G-SUGA, offering business and executive jet charters.

=== Amsprop ===
Amsprop is a property investment firm owned by Sugar and is now controlled by his son Daniel.

Simon Ambrose, winner of the 2007 series of The Apprentice, started working for Amsprop Estates after the series finished. However, in April 2010, he was reported to be leaving to start his own venture.

=== Viglen Ltd ===
Sugar was the owner (and Chairman of the board) of Viglen Ltd, an IT services provider catering primarily to the education and public sector. He resigned his position on 1 July 2009. Following the sale of Amstrad PLC to BSkyB, Viglen was Sugar's sole IT establishment until its sale to XMA in 2014.

=== Amscreen ===
Sugar is Chairman of Amscreen, a company run by his son Simon, specialising in selling advertising space on digital signage screens that it provides to retailers, medical centres and leisure venues. Apprentice winner Yasmina Siadatan worked there, selling into the NHS.

The screens use a Face detection system called OptimEyes to try to identify age and sex of its viewers.

In July 2008, Amscreen purchased Comtech M2M, which was founded in September 1992, originally specialising in communications product retailing. This was before entering the M2M market in 1999. On 29 August 2008, Comtech M2M officially changed names to Amscreen Limited.

=== YouView ===
On 7 March 2011, Sugar replaced Kip Meek on the board of the BBC initiated IPTV project known as YouView (formerly known as Project Canvas) which is also backed by ITV, Channel 4 and Channel 5 and broadband providers including BT and TalkTalk. Sugar was paid £500,000 for chairing YouView for the year ending March 2012.

== Politics ==
From 1997 until 2015, Sugar was a member of the Labour Party. In 2001, he was one of Labour's top 50 donors, giving £200,000 to its head office.

Regarding the 1970s UK law which states that it is discriminatory and hence illegal for women to be asked at interview whether they plan to have children, Sugar was quoted as saying in 2008, "These laws are counter-productive for women, that's the bottom line. You're not allowed to ask, so it's easy – just don't employ them. It will get harder to get a job as a woman."

In February 2009 it was reported that Sugar had been approached to be the Labour candidate for Mayor of London in 2012. Sugar subsequently ridiculed the suggestion. In June 2009 it was reported that he would be given a life peerage by prime minister Gordon Brown and had been offered a job as the government's "Enterprise Champion". On 7 June 2009, Sugar sought to clarify the non-political nature of his appointment. He stated that he would not be joining the government, that the appointment was politically neutral, and that all he wanted to do was help businesses and entrepreneurs. On 20 July 2009, he was made Baron Sugar, of Clapton, in the London Borough of Hackney. He made his maiden speech in the House of Lords on 25 November 2009.

In 2011, Sugar donated a total of £69,000 to Labour or to leader Ed Miliband's office, but the following year he defied party rules to implore the public to not vote for its candidate for London Mayor, Ken Livingstone. In August 2014, Sugar was one of 200 public figures who were signatories to a letter to The Guardian expressing their hope that Scotland would vote to remain part of the United Kingdom in September's referendum on that issue.

According to the BBC in 2015, Sugar had donated £163,827 to Labour since Miliband had become leader in 2010, but on 11 May 2015, four days after the Conservative Party won that year's general election, Sugar announced that he was leaving Labour, explaining that he had lost confidence in the party's business policies. From 11 May 2015 to 8 October 2017, he sat in the Lords as a non-affiliated peer. Since 9 October 2017, he has sat as a crossbencher.

Before the 2016 London mayoral election, Sugar said that he is popular politically, and repeatedly urged the public to not vote for the eventual winner, Labour candidate Sadiq Khan. In 2016, Sugar endorsed the "Remain" campaign for the referendum on membership of the European Union. He was reappointed to the Enterprise Champion role in 2016 by prime minister David Cameron.

In May 2017, Sugar endorsed the Conservative Party at that year's general election. After the election he criticised Theresa May's Conservative campaign, and people who voted for Labour under Jeremy Corbyn.

On 31 March 2018, after complaints from Labour politicians, Sugar deleted a tweet showing an edited image of Corbyn in a car with Adolf Hitler, which he posted after Corbyn said the party "must do better" in resolving the party's problems with antisemitism. On 5 April 2018, Sugar published an ode critical of Corbyn, and in December that year, he stated that he would leave Britain if Corbyn became prime minister.

Sugar endorsed Boris Johnson during the 2019 Conservative Party leadership election, and endorsed the party in that year's general election.

Sugar's participation in House of Lords business has been relatively infrequent, including a period of no spoken contributions from 2017 to 2025. He has not voted since October 2017. Sugar went on a leave of absence from the House of Lords on 6 October 2025.

== Personal life ==
Sugar has stated that he is an atheist, but remains proud of his Jewish heritage. He married Ann Simons, a former hairdresser, on 28 April 1968 at Great Portland Street, London. They have two sons, Daniel and Simon, and a daughter, Louise. The couple formerly lived mainly in Chigwell, Essex.

On 10 June 2020, Sugar, a pilot since 1975, announced that he was taking delivery of a new 2020 Cirrus SR22T single-engine aircraft. During an attempted landing in his Cirrus at the grass airfield Manchester Barton Aerodrome on 5 July 2008, he overshot the runway after touchdown due to poor weather and wet field conditions. No injuries were sustained, although the plane was slightly damaged and consequently grounded.

In 2023, Sugar had an estimated fortune of £1.02 billion.

In the 2020s, Sugar relocated to Australia permanently as a tax exile to help mitigate his UK tax liability. The move backfired when his financial advisers failed to take account of 2010 tax reforms that apply to peers of the realm. As a result, Sugar paid £186m to HMRC for tax owed on share dividends that he received from his company Amshold in 2021, amounting to £390m.

In February 2009, it was reported that Sugar had initiated legal proceedings against The Sun newspaper following a report that he had been named on a "hit list" of British Jews in response to Israel's ongoing military operation in Gaza. The threats are alleged to have been made by Glen Jenvey, the source of the original story in The Sun, who posted to a Muslim website under a false identity.

In February 2022, 70-year-old Patrick Gomes was jailed for three years and six months for sending antisemitic death threats to Sugar, in response to his comments on antisemitism in the Labour Party.

== Honours ==
Sugar was knighted in the 2000 New Year Honours "for services to the Home Computer and Electronics Industry". He holds two honorary Doctorates of Science, awarded in 1988 by City University and in 2005 by Brunel University. He is a philanthropist for charities such as Jewish Care and Great Ormond Street Hospital, and donated £200,000 to the British Labour Party in 2001. Sugar was created a life peer as Baron Sugar, of Clapton in the London Borough of Hackney on 20 July 2009. On 29 October 2015, Sugar was listed by UK-based company Richtopia at number 5 in the list of 100 Most Influential British Entrepreneurs. In 2017 he ranked number 1 in the Essex Power 100 list and was named the most powerful person in Essex.

Coat of arms of Alan Sugar
Crest Perched on three square billets abutting in fess Argent a cockerell Azure supporting with the dexter claws a sugar cane Vert. Escutcheon Per chevron throughout Argent and Azure per saltire abased counterchanged a square billet and two spur rowels upwards in chevron counterchanged. Supporters On either side an owl guardant Azure beaked and legged Or each statant on one leg on a spool Azure of coiled film-stock unwinding therefrom a length of film Proper reflexed behind the back and held in the beak. Motto Tute Id Fac

== Controversies ==
Sugar has been accused of having an "outdated" attitude towards women.

On 30 September 2013, Sugar tweeted a picture of Chinese child crying 'because he was told off for leaving production line of iPhone 5'. The message was investigated by the Merseyside police force's specialist hate crime investigation team, who decided that it should be classed as a "hate incident" although no crime had taken place.

== Autobiography ==
- What You See Is What You Get: My Autobiography (2011), Sugar's autobiography

Business positions
Preceded by Irving Scholar	Tottenham Hotspur F.C. chairman 1991–2001	Succeeded by Daniel Levy
Orders of precedence in the United Kingdom
Preceded by The Lord Freud	Gentlemen; Baron Sugar	Followed by The Lord Hall of Birkenhead
