= Lil' Ed Williams =

American blues musician (born 1955)

- Williams at the Richmond Folk Festival in 2026

Background information
- Born: April 8, 1955 (age 71); Chicago, Illinois, United States
- Genres: Chicago blues, electric blues, contemporary blues
- Occupations: Guitarist, singer, songwriter
- Instruments: Guitar, vocals
- Years active: Early 1980s–present
- Labels: Alligator, Earwig Music
- Website: LilEdBlues.com

Lil' Ed Williams (born April 8, 1955, Chicago, Illinois) is an American blues slide guitarist, singer and songwriter. With his backing band, the Blues Imperials, he has built up a loyal following.

== Biography ==
In childhood, Williams and his half-brother James "Pookie" Young received encouragement and tutelage from their uncle, the blues guitarist, songwriter and recording artist J. B. Hutto, who introduced them to his student Dave Weld. Together with Dave Weld, (rhythm guitar and vocals) formed the first version of the Blues Imperials. Since 1989, the band's lineup has been Williams (lead guitar and vocals), Michael Garrett (rhythm guitar and vocals), James Young (bass) and Kelly Littleton (drums). Living Blues magazine described the band as "Rough-and-ready South and West Side blues...Ed's swirling, snarling slide guitar work can be riveting, and The Imperials pound out blues-rock riffs and rhythms behind him as if they're overdosing on boogie juice." Guitar Player called the band "a snarling boogie-blues machine."

A decade later, Alligator Records offered them the chance to record a track, "Young Thing", for a compilation album, New Bluebloods (1987). Producer and label owner Bruce Iglauer encouraged them to record additional material, and they cut a full album's worth of material at that session, released as Roughhousin' (1986). They then appeared at music festivals and toured widely. Their second album, Chicken, Gravy & Biscuits, was released in 1989, and their third, What You See Is What You Get, in 1992. At this point the group disbanded. Williams issued two solo albums, Keep On Walking, on which he was joined by Dave Weld, a former member of the Blues Imperials, and Who's Been Talking (1998), pairing Williams with Willie Kent.

Lil’ Ed & the Blues Imperials at Richmond Folk Festival in Richmond, VA, October, 9, 2026

In 1999 the release of Get Wild! marked the group's reunion. It was followed by Heads Up! (2002), Rattleshake (2006), Full Tilt (2008) and Jump Start (2012).

Lil' Ed and the Blues Imperials have appeared multiple times at the Chicago Blues Festival and festivals and clubs around the world. In June 2008, Williams played on three tracks on Magic Slim & the Teardrops's album Midnight Blues. In June 2009, Williams was a guest on the radio quiz show Wait Wait... Don't Tell Me!, produced by Chicago Public Radio and National Public Radio.

Lil' Ed and the Blues Imperials have been nominated for eight Blues Music Awards as Band of the Year and have won that award twice.

Lil’ Ed and the Blues Imperials are 2024 inductees of the Blues Foundation's Blues Hall of Fame.

== Discography ==
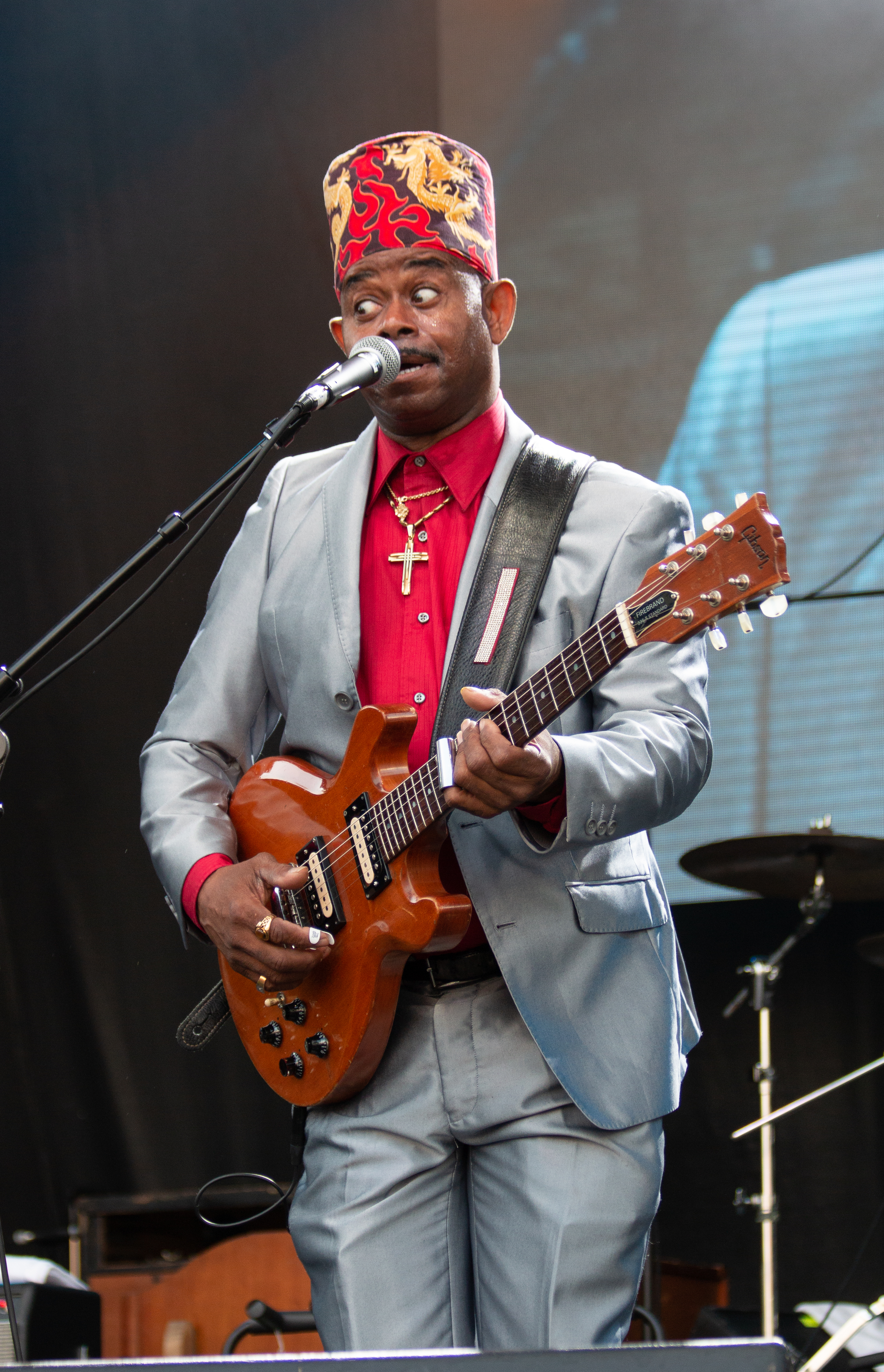
Williams performing at the Kitchener Blues Festival in 2018

=== Lil' Ed and the Blues Imperials ===
- Roughhousin' (1986), Alligator
- Chicken, Gravy and Biscuits (1989), Alligator
- What You See Is What You Get (1992), Alligator
- Get Wild! (1999), Alligator
- Heads Up! (2002), Alligator
- Rattleshake (2006), Alligator
- Full Tilt (2008), Alligator
- Jump Start (2012), Alligator
- The Big Sound Of.... (2016), Alligator
- Slideways (2026), Alligator

=== Solo ===
- Keep On Walkin' (1996), Earwig Music
- Who's Been Talking (1998), Earwig Music

== See also ==
- List of Chicago blues musicians
