= Whatcha See Is Whatcha Get =

Whatcha See Is Whatcha Get may refer to:

- "Whatcha See Is Whatcha Get" (album), a 1971 album by The Dramatics
  - "Whatcha See Is Whatcha Get" (song), the title track from the album
- Stand by Me (Whatcha See Is Whatcha Get), 1971 album by Pretty Purdie and The Playboys

== See also ==
- WYSIWYG (disambiguation)
- What You See Is What You Get (disambiguation)
