= Heads Up! (Lil' Ed Williams album) =

Studio album by Lil' Ed Williams
- Released: 2002
- Genre: Blues
- Label: Alligator
- Producer: Ed Williams, Bruce Iglauer

Lil' Ed Williams chronology
Get Wild! (1999)	Heads Up! (2002)	Rattleshake (2006)

Heads Up! is an album by the American musician Lil' Ed Williams, released in 2002. It was his fifth album for Alligator Records. He is credited with his band, the Blues Imperials. Williams supported the album with North American, European, and Asian tours. Heads Up! debuted at No. 14 on Billboard's Top Blues Albums chart.

== Production ==
Heads Up! was produced by Lil' Ed and Bruce Iglauer. Lil' Ed and the band recorded 32 songs in three days; he wrote 11 of the songs that were chosen for the album. His wife, Pam, wrote "My Mind Is Gone". His stepbrother, Pookie Young, played bass on Heads Up! "Black Night" is a cover of the Jessie Mae Robinson song. "Ed Heads' Boogie" is an instrumental paean to the band's fans.

== Critical reception ==
Professional ratings
Review scores
Source	Rating
AllMusic	3.5/5 stars
The Gazette	4/4 stars
Ottawa Citizen	4/5 stars
The Penguin Guide to Blues Recordings	4/4 stars
The Philadelphia Inquirer	3/4 stars

The Ottawa Citizen called Lil' Ed the "spiritual descendent of houserocking giant Hound Dog Taylor." The Philadelphia Inquirer praised "the achingly brooding 'I Still Love You'." The Toronto Star noted that Lil' Ed's "voice is more tough and gruff than tender, with fat hints of Taj Mahal." The Gazette said that Lil' Ed fronts "one of the tightest rhythm sections in the blues." The Chicago Tribune opined that, "blues being blues, Williams, a decent guitarist, over-solos on 'Black Night' and 'I Still Love You'." The Associated Press determined that Lil' Ed "doesn't so much play slide guitar as wrench the life out of it."

AllMusic advised: "Listen to 'The Creeper' to get an idea of the savage fury that he can channel through his slide guitar work. This disc manifests that feel for the blues that can't be taught, but must be both lived and seen from the inside." The Penguin Guide to Blues Recordings wrote that the album "fizzes with presence and immediacy."

== Track listing ==
No.	Title	Length
1.	"Woman in the Castle"
2.	"Never Miss Your Water"
3.	"Natural Man"
4.	"The Creeper"
5.	"My Mind Is Gone"
6.	"Four Leaf Clover"
7.	"Lil' Ed's Home Cookin'"
8.	"Black Night"
9.	"Empty House Tour"
10.	"Computer Girl"
11.	"Ed Heads' Boogie"
12.	"I Still Love You"
13.	"I Love My Baby"
