= Get Wild! =

Studio album by Lil' Ed Williams
- Released: 1999
- Genre: Blues
- Label: Alligator
- Producer: Bruce Iglauer

Lil' Ed Williams chronology
Who's Been Talking (1998)	Get Wild! (1999)	Heads Up! (2002)

Get Wild! is an album by the American musician Lil' Ed Williams, released in 1999. It marked a reunion with his band, the Blues Imperials. Williams supported the album with a North American tour.

== Production ==
The album was produced by Bruce Iglauer. Williams recorded it in a basement studio, using mattresses to prevent sound leakage, and overdubbing just twice his guitar parts. He played a Washburn customized guitar. The album title refers to Williams's desired reaction from a live audience. "Once in a Lifetime" is dedicated to Williams's wife, Pam. The covers of "Pet Cream Man" and "Too Late" were written by Williams's uncle, J. B. Hutto. "Change My Way of Living" is about Williams's days of hard living; other songs recount his successful battles with addiction.

== Critical reception ==
Professional ratings
Review scores
Source	Rating
All Music Guide to the Blues	4/5 stars
DownBeat	3.5/5 stars
The Encyclopedia of Popular Music	3/5 stars
Houston Chronicle	3.5/4 stars
The Penguin Guide to Blues Recordings	3/4 stars
Pittsburgh Post-Gazette	2.5/4 stars

The Washington Post said, "When Lil' Ed Williams starts sliding his silver cylinder up and down his guitar and starts hollering that there's 'Nothing I Wouldn't Do', it doesn't matter how rudimentary the licks are or how modest his baritone; all that matters is the uninhibited fervor that he and the band bring to the song." The Pittsburgh Post-Gazette called the album "fiery, straight-ahead, hard-rocking blues." The Houston Chronicle stated that Williams plays "ferocious, rawboned slide guitar [for] a postmodern era." The Star Tribune called the Blues Imperials "one of the best party blues outfits extant". The Morning Call praised the "ears-back, hard-core Chicago slide approach".

== Track listing ==
No.	Title	Length
1.	"Singing Slide"
2.	"You Got to Stop"
3.	"Standing on the Corner"
4.	"Too Late"
5.	"Compact Man"
6.	"She Don't Love Me No More"
7.	"Nothing I Wouldn't Do"
8.	"Change My Way of Living"
9.	"Independent Superwoman"
10.	"The Monkey and the Rabbit"
11.	"The Cannonball"
12.	"Once in a Lifetime"
13.	"Get Out!"
14.	"Pet Cream Man"
