= What You See Is What You Get (Lil' Ed Williams album) =

Studio album by Lil' Ed Williams
- Released: 1992
- Genre: Blues
- Label: Alligator
- Producers: Bruce Iglauer, Ed Williams

Lil' Ed Williams chronology
Chicken, Gravy and Biscuits (1989)	What You See Is What You Get (1992)	Keep On Walkin' (1996)

What You See Is What You Get is an album by the American musician Lil' Ed Williams, released in 1992. He is credited with his band, the Blues Imperials. Williams supported the album with a North American tour. Following the tour, Williams temporarily broke up the band to concentrate on solo work.

== Production ==
The album was coproduced by Bruce Iglauer. Williams wrote 12 of the album's 14 tracks; he employed a pinky slide on many of the songs. What You See Is What You Get includes a cover of his uncle J. B. Hutto's "Please Help". "Upset Man" was written by the band's bass player, James "Pookie" Young. Eddie McKinley joined the band on saxophone.

== Critical reception ==
Professional ratings
Review scores
Source	Rating
AllMusic	3/5 stars
Chicago Tribune	2.5/5 stars
The Encyclopedia of Popular Music	3/5 stars
MusicHound Blues: The Essential Album Guide	2.5/5 stars
The Penguin Guide to Blues Recordings	4/4 stars

The Chicago Tribune called much of Williams's music "one-dimensional contemporary blues," but acknowledged that McKinley "mercifully brightens the shuffle-heavy grooves." The St. Petersburg Times said that "the band can really dig into a stomping groove, accented by Ed's slide guitar, greasy as a just-lubricated truck axle."

The Washington Post concluded that the Imperials "sound like every other baby-boomer, blues 'n' boogie bar band in the land." The Los Angeles Times opined that "the Imperials are something of a detriment to Williams' purity, lacking the personality and sense of tradition that Williams so easily possesses." The Houston Chronicle determined that Williams "has a seriousness of purpose that, combined with his intuitive understanding and exuberant attack, make this one of the most listenable 'classic' blues albums of recent years."

AllMusic deemed the album "hard-driving good-time electric blues."

== Track listing ==
No.	Title	Length
1.	"Life Is Like Gambling"
2.	"Find My Baby"
3.	"Older Woman"
4.	"Please Help"
5.	"Toothache"
6.	"Living for Today"
7.	"Travellin' Life"
8.	"Out of the House"
9.	"Upset Man"
10.	"Long, Long Way from Home"
11.	"What You See Is What You Get"
12.	"Bluesmobile"
13.	"What Am I Gonna Do?"
14.	"Packin' Up"
