= Enterprise Champion =

Government position in the UK

Enterprise Champion to the Business Secretary
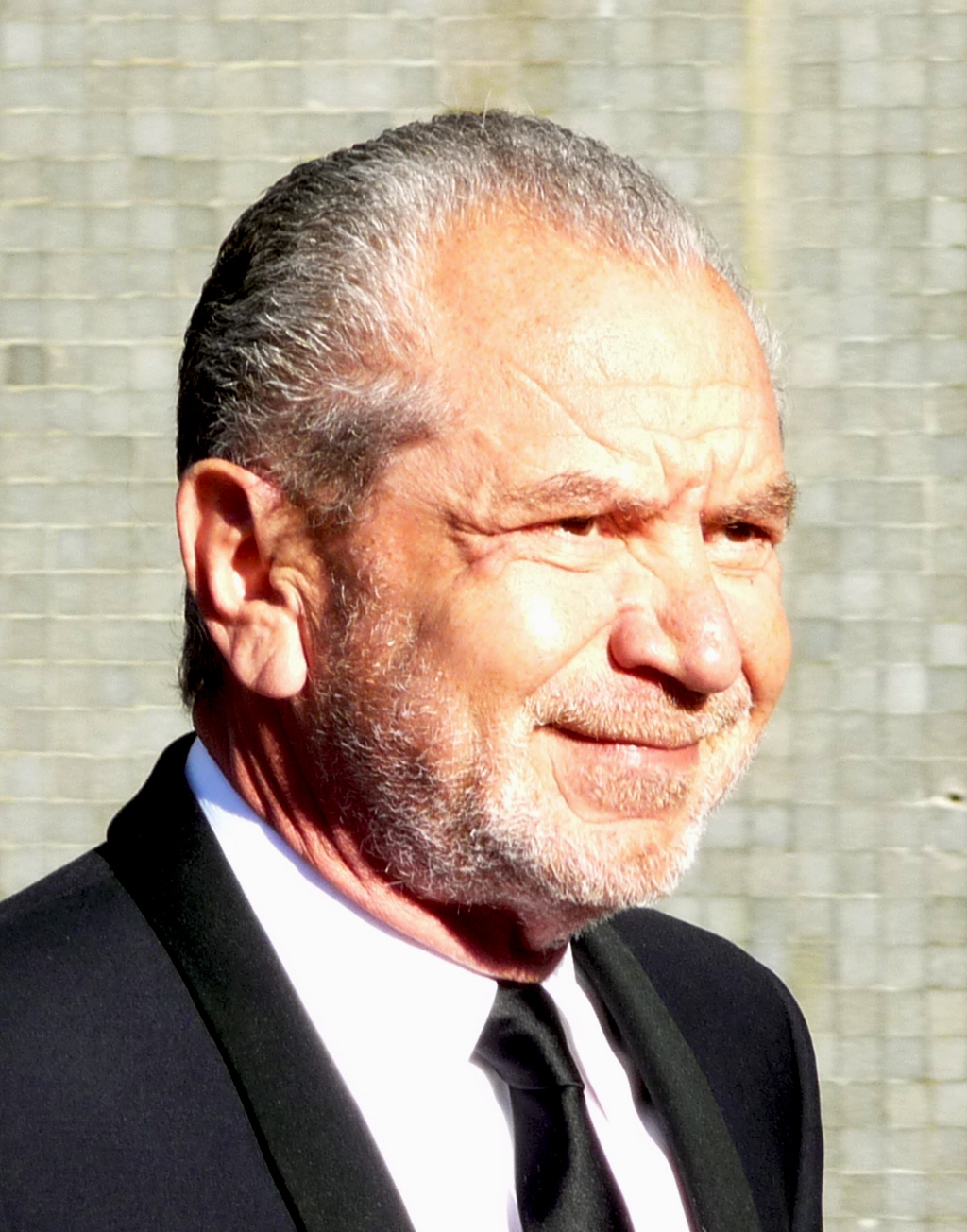
- Longest serving Alan Sugar, Baron Sugar; 5 June 2009 – 11 May 2010; 25 May 2016 – 24 July 2019
- Reports to: Secretary of State for Business and Trade
- Appointer: Prime Minister of the United Kingdom
- Formation: 5 June 2009
- First holder: Alan Sugar

Enterprise Champion or Enterprise Tsar was a position within the UK Government responsible for promoting entrepreneurship and advising the Department for Business and Trade. The role was held by Alan Sugar, the businessman and star of BBC One's The Apprentice, beginning in 2009 during the Brown ministry (2007–10). During this time, he was ennobled as Lord Sugar.

Sugar was also kept on by Conservative Party prime ministers David Cameron in the 2015 United Kingdom general election and by Theresa May after the Brexit referendum.
