= What You See Is What You Get (book) =

2010 autobiography by Alan Sugar

What You See Is What You Get: My Autobiography
- Author: Alan Sugar
- Language: English
- Genre: Autobiography
- Published: 30 September 2010 Macmillan
- Publication place: United Kingdom
- Media type: Print (Hardback)
- Pages: 640
- ISBN: 978-0-230-74933-7

What You See Is What You Get is the autobiography of British businessman and TV personality Lord Alan Sugar. The 640-page book, which was published in May 2011, tells the story of Alan Sugar's birth and childhood in a deprived part of London, how he founded the company Amstrad aged just 21 years old, and how he eventually became a multi-millionaire tycoon, received a knighthood, and was appointed to the House of Lords.
