= List of The Secret Millionaire episodes =

The Secret Millionaire was originally broadcast on Channel 4 in the United Kingdom from 29 November 2006 to June 2012.

It was Channel 4's highest rated new show of 2006.

== Series ==
Series	Episodes	Originally released	
Series	Episodes	First released	Last released
1	5	29 November 2006	2 January 2007
2	6	7 November 2007	19 December 2007
3	8 + 1 Special	5 August 2008	23 September 2008
4	8	22 March 2009	10 May 2009
5	6	16 September 2009	24 December 2009
6	5	1 March 2010	29 March 2010
7	7 + 3 Specials	17 October 2010	2 December 2010
8	6	26 April 2011	31 May 2011
9	8	16 October 2011	4 December 2011
10	7	14 May 2012	24 June 2012

== Episodes ==
=== Series 1 (2006/07) ===
No. overall	No. in series	Millionaire	Location	Donation	Original release date
1	1	"Ben Way"	Barnsley, South Yorkshire	£40,000	29 November 2006
2	2	"John Elliott"	Kensington, Liverpool, Merseyside	£10,000 + £7,500 + Job	6 December 2006
3	3	"Charan Gill"	Thetford, Breckland, Norfolk	£10,000 + £15,000 + £5,000	13 December 2006
4	4	"Paul Williams"	Thorntree, Middlesbrough, North Yorkshire	£10,000 + £10,000 + £10,000	20 December 2006
5	5	"Emma Harrison"	Becontree, Barking and Dagenham, London	£30,000 + £5,000 + £15,000	2 January 2007

=== Series 2 (2007) ===
No. overall	No. in series	Millionaire	Location	Donation	Original release date
6	1	"Gill Fielding"	Canning Town, Newham, London	£250,000 + Laptop + House	7 November 2007
7	2	"Chek Whyte"	Salford, City of Salford, Greater Manchester	£50,000 + Home Improvement	14 November 2007
8	3	"Terry George"	Penzance, Cornwall	£30,000 + Shaver	28 November 2007
9	4	"Mo Chaudry"	Harehills, Leeds, West Yorkshire	£29,000	5 December 2007
10	5	"David Pearl"	Cosham, Portsmouth, Hampshire	5 x £10,000	12 December 2007
11	6	"Margaret Heffernan"	St Ann's, Nottingham, Nottinghamshire	£30,000	19 December 2007

=== Series 3 (2008) ===
No. overall	No. in series	Millionaire	Location	Donation	Original release date
12	1	"James Benamor"	Moss Side, Manchester	£136,000 + Job	5 August 2008
13	2	"Kavita Oberoi"	Ladywood, Birmingham, West Midlands	£45,000	26 August 2008
14	3	"Nick Leslau"	Possilpark, Glasgow, Scotland	£341,000	23 September 2008
15	4	"Carl Hopkins"	Easington, County Durham	£35,000	30 September 2008
16	5	"Daniel Smith"	Newington, Southwark, London	£30,000	7 October 2008
17	6	"Hilary Devey"	Falinge, Rochdale, Greater Manchester	£136,000	14 October 2008
18	7	"Gavin Wheeldon"	Rhyl, Denbighshire, Wales	£43,700 + Laptop	21 October 2008
19	8	"Caroline Marsh"	Toxteth, Liverpool, Merseyside	£70,000	28 October 2008
S*	S	"Various"	Various	None	4 November 2008

- The special episode was featured on Christmas Day 2008 was entitled "Where Are they Now?"

=== Series 4 (2009) ===
No. overall	No. in series	Millionaire	Location	Donation	Original release date
20	1	"Kevin Morley"	Tottenham, Haringey, London	£250,000 + Trip to Disneyland	22 March 2009
21	2	"Gary Eastwood"	Blackpool, Lancashire	£50,000	29 March 2009
22	3	"Jennifer Cheyne"	Aberfan, Merthyr Tydfil, Wales	£70,000	5 April 2009
23	4	"Jonathan Hick"	Hendon, Sunderland, Tyne and Wear	£5,000 + £20,000 + £15,000	12 April 2009
24	5	"Rob Lloyd"	Shankill Road, Belfast, Northern Ireland	£10,000 + £5,000 + £5,000 + £20,000	19 April 2009
25	6	"Martin Stamp"	Kingston upon Hull, East Riding of Yorkshire	2 x £20,000	26 April 2009
26	7	"Rob Calcraft"	Barrow Island, Barrow-in-Furness, Cumbria	£10,000 + £3,000 + £7,000 + £20,000	4 May 2009
27	8	"Roisin Isaacs"	Dundee, Tayside, Scotland	£10,000 + £7,500 + £7,500 + £2,000 + £13,000	10 May 2009

=== Series 5 (2009) ===
No. overall	No. in series	Millionaire	Location	Donation	Original release date
28	1	"Liz Jackson"	Honor Oak, Lewisham, London	£8,000 + £5,000 + £20,000	20 October 2009
29	2	"Kevin Green"	Barnstaple, North Devon, Devon	£20,000 + £12,000 + £20,000 + £7,500	27 October 2009
30	3	"Tony Banks"	Anfield, Liverpool, Merseyside	£30,000 + £20,000 + £20,000	17 November 2009
31	4	"Dominic List"	Peckham, Southwark, London	£30,000 + £10,000 + £10,000 + Home Relocation	24 November 2009
32	5	"Charlie Mullins"	Warrington, Cheshire	3 x £20,000	1 December 2009
33	6	"John Griffin"	Scotswood, Newcastle upon Tyne, Tyne and Wear	£75,000 + £50,000 + £20,000	8 December 2009

=== Series 6 (2010) ===
No. overall	No. in series	Millionaire	Location	Donation	Original release date
34	1	"Dawn Gibbins"	Bristol, South West England	£25,000 + £100,000 + £125,000	1 March 2010
35	2	"Paul Ragan"	Derby, East Midlands	£45,000	8 March 2010
36	3	"Jahan Abedi"	Leicester, East Midlands	£5,000 + £10,000 + £50,000	15 March 2010
37	4	"Fil Adams-Mercer"	Doncaster, South Yorkshire	2 x £10,000 + £20,000	22 March 2010
38	5	"David Jamilly"	Redcar, North Yorkshire	3 x £25,000	29 March 2010

=== Series 7 (2010) ===
No. overall	No. in series	Millionaire	Location	Donation	Original release date
39	1	"Chris Brown"	Manchester	£10,000 + £15,000 (declined) + £25,000	17 October 2010
40	2	"Richard North"	Cardiff, Wales	Football lessons + £10,000 + £15,000 + £5,000 + £20,000 + £10,000	8 March 2010
41	3	"Marcelle Speller"	Plymouth	£8,000 + £20,000 + £40,000	15 March 2010
42	4	"Mark Pearson"	Nottingham	£40,000 + £3,000 + £59,000	22 March 2010
43	5	"Bradley Reback"	Brighton	TBA	14 November 2010
44	6	"Gordon McAlpine"	Govan, Glasgow, Scotland	£15,500 + £15,000 + £20,000	18 November 2010
45	7	"Tom Mairs"	Bootle, Liverpool, Merseyside	£8,500 + £30,000 + £10,000 a year	25 November 2010

=== Changed My Life (2010/11) ===
No. overall	No. in series	Millionaire	Location	Donation	Original release date
46	8	"Tony Banks (Revisit)"	Anfield, Liverpool, Merseyside	N/A	19 November 2010
47	9	"Paul Ragan (Revisit)"	Derby, East Midlands	N/A	18 November 2010
48	10	"Dawn Gibbins (Revisit)"	Bristol, South West England	N/A	11 January 2011

=== Series 8 (2011) ===
No. overall	No. in series	Millionaire	Location	Donation	Original release date
49	1	"Sean Gallagher"	Middlesbrough	£50,000 + £25,000 + £50,000	26 April 2011
50	2	"Simrin Choudhrie"	Burngreave, Sheffield	£3,000 + £100,000 + £5,000 + £100,000 + £37,500	3 May 2011
51	3	"Piers Linney"	Wolverhampton	N/A	10 May 2011
52	4	"Lyn Cecil"	Islington	N/A	17 May 2011
53	5	"Sue Stone"	Coventry	N/A	24 May 2011
54	6	"Aria Taheri"	Sparkbrook, Birmingham	Free PC?	31 May 2011

=== Series 9 (2011) ===
No. overall	No. in series	Millionaire	Location	Donation	Original release date
55	1	"Adee Phelan"	Brooklands, Jaywick, Clacton-on-Sea, Essex	£20,000 + £5,000 + Staff + £28,000 + £3,000	16 October 2011
56	2	"Ivan Massow"	Pilton, Edinburgh, Scotland	£50,000 + £5,000 + £2,500 + £17,500 + £15,000 + £1,500	23 October 2011
57	3	"Edward Douglas-Miller"	Norwich	£14,000 + £15,000 + £4,000 + £12,000 + £2,000	30 October 2011
58	4	"Lee Stafford"	Salford, City of Salford, Greater Manchester	£20,000 + £25,000 + £16,000	6 November 2011
59	5	"Dr Chai Patel"	Sheffield	£15,000 + £20,000 + £30,000 + £10,000 + Minibus	13 November 2011
60	6	"Mike Greene"	Peterborough	£20,000 + £40,000	20 November 2011
61	7	"Charles Allen"	Leeds	£35,000 + £35,000 + £35,000	27 November 2011
62	8	"Mike Holland"	Grimsby	£15,000 + £5,000 + £5,000 + £20,000 + £5,000	4 December 2011

=== Series 10 (2012) ===
No. overall	No. in series	Millionaire	Location	Donation	Original release date
63	1	"David King (did not hide identity)"	Beeston, Leeds	£15,000 + £17,000 + £25,000	26 March 2012
64	2	"Matthew Newbury"	Moston	£10,000 + £5,000 & £5,000 + £3,000 & £30,000	16 April 2012
65	3	"Arfan Razak"	Cowley, Oxford	£13,500 + £25,000 + £11,500	23 April 2012
66	4	"Carol Hayes"	Glasgow	£12,000 + £20,000 + £20,000	30 April 2012
67	5	"Bobby Dudani"	Croydon	£15,000 + £12,500 + £17,500 + £21,000 + employment supports	7 May 2012
68	6	"Philip Johnston"	Swansea	£10,000 + £35,000 + £70,000 + £20,000	14 May 2012
69	7	"Andrew Feldman"	Bradford	£25,000 + £28,000 + £100,000 & £5,000 holiday	21 May 2012
