= Steg G =

Scottish hip hop producer and recording artist

Steven Gilfoyle (born in Glasgow, Scotland; is better known by his stage name Steg G) is a Scottish hip hop music producer, radio presenter and recording artist. His involvement with Scottish hip-hop culture began with a pioneering role in the early to mid '90s, and he is still involved twenty years later. He ran Powercut Productions, a hip hop label based in Glasgow, Scotland.

== Biography ==
He started his early hip hop career working with local rap acts such as BAAD Company and Sons of the Devil as their DJ and producer. His first official single was released on Devil Discs and was with a 4-piece group called Powermove (Steg G, Shoey, Freestyle Master Jimmy P). The single "But We're Different" was an early example of Hip Hop music which featured a Scottish accent and perspective.

He has performed with 50 Cent and Kanye West. He performed at the "Kelvingroove" festival in Glasgow in 2007.

Steg G has worked closely with several high-profile Scottish rap artists, including: Werd (sons of Scotland). MOG, Respek BA, Loki, Wee D, Wardie Burns, Uvbeatz and long time collaborator Freestyle Master.

He has remixed tracks for Sugar Minot, Stanley Odd, Clan Disciples, Wardie Burns, Werd, and A Band Called Quinn. He has also supported acts by DJing.

== Radio ==
He has been involved in training and development work through community radio for several years. He presents hip-hop radio shows on Sunny Govan, a community radio station based in Glasgow. In 2010, he appeared on TV in the UK version of the TV show "The Secret Millionaire" meeting Gordon McAlpine – a multimillionaire who had gone undercover to meet Steg G to and see the community development work happening at the station. Since 2007, Sunny Govan has become the biggest community station in Glasgow, providing an open door to broadcasting for people with disabilities and special needs. Steg G was also involved performing on and producing the 'Turn it Up Glasgow' CD to raise money for community development. In 2014, Steg G hosted rappers from both sides of the Scottish independence referendum debate on his show.

== Cultural awareness ==
Steg G has been rapping with an authentic Scottish voice before many other artists were confident to do so.

In 2007, he responded to a TV makeover show called "Colin and Justin on the estate" by making a video called "Schemes". In March 2015, together with 'The Freestyle Master', he released a video to raise awareness of the Barras, a market which is one of Glasgow's famous institutions.

In 2010, he helped to produce the "Anti Knife Crime EP", a project run in conjunction with The Leith Agency which was aiming to reduce knife crime by reaching out to a young audience.

== Discography ==
- 1993 - Powermove - But We're different
- 1994 - Freestyke Master - the Next level EP
- 1997 - The Abstract Terror - various artists
- 2003 – Clyde Built (CD)
- 2006 – Steg G & Freestyle Master – Temptation
- 2006 – Natural Selection (CD)
- 2007 – Wayward Son (EP)
- 2009 – Steg G – Vulgar Eloquence (CD)
- 2012 – Steg G & the Freestyle Master – 60 minutes of Fizzunk Vol 1
- 2014 – Steg G & the Freestyle Master – Inner City Pressures (EP)
- 2019 – Steg G - The Air In Between
