= Kindness UK =

British non-profit organization

- Kindness UK logo
- Founded: 2011
- Founder: David Jamilly
- Type: Not-for-profit organization
- Region served: United Kingdom
- Website: kindnessuk.com

Kindness UK is an independent London-based not-for-profit organisation that promotes kindness in United Kingdom.

== History ==
Kindness UK was founded by social entrepreneur David Jamilly in 2011 with the aim of undertaking initiatives to enhance the value and profile of kindness in society. Jamilly previously founded Pod Children's Charity in 1977, the Good Deeds Organisation in 2007 and co-founded Kindness Day UK in 2010.

== Educational initiatives ==
=== Schools ===
In 2016 Kindness UK in collaboration with Coolabi Group developed a month-long campaign Clangers for Kindness, designed to promote simple acts of kindness among kids and their parents.

=== Universities ===
In partnership with the University of Sussex the Kindness UK Doctoral Conference was launched in 2015. The Kindness UK Doctoral Conference Award is open to all academic disciplines and is dedicated to the kindness and its effect on people and communities.

Interdisciplinary University of Sussex Kindness UK Symposium was held in 2016.

== Public initiatives ==
In 2014 on Kindness Day UK, Kindness UK distributed 10,000 chocolate bars at London Underground stations as a random act of kindness.

== Kindness Day UK ==
Kindness Day UK encourages the public to recognize the value of kindness and perform at least one act of kindness on the day. Kindness UK is a lead UK organisation that promotes and celebrates Kindness Day UK.

== External campaigns ==
Kindness UK were asked to guest judge Nissan's CARED4 competition which was aimed to search for and reward kind people in the community.
