= Fire and Steel Festival =

Festival in Redcar, North Yorkshire

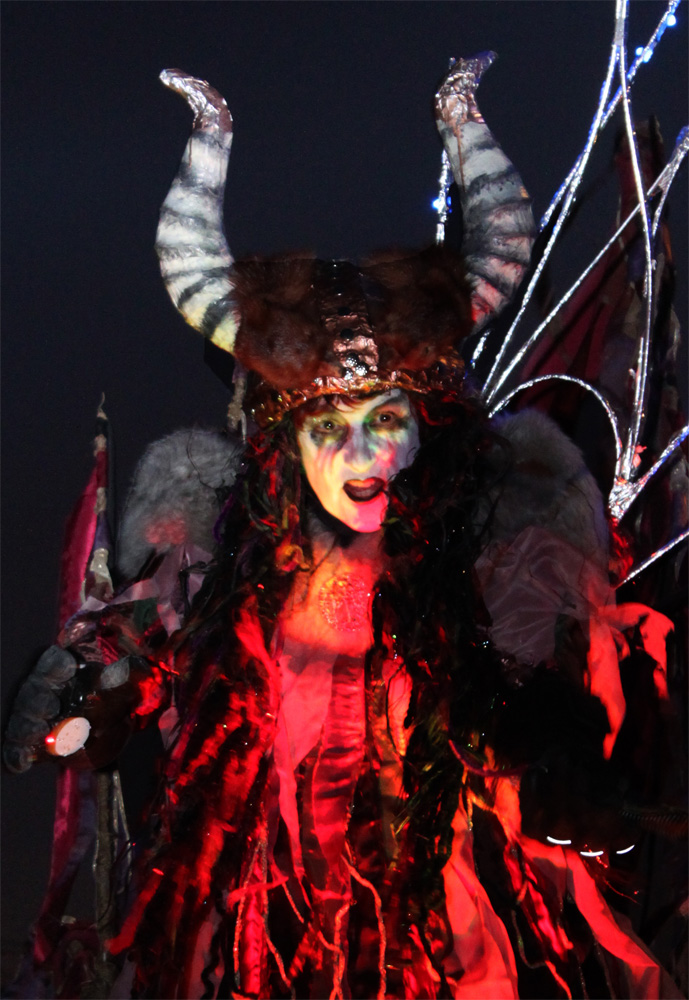
- Genre: Fire Festival / Free Community Festival / Parade
- Dates: Saturday 19 February
- Locations: Redcar, North Yorkshire, England
- Years active: 2011

Fire and Steel Festival was a one-day festival held in Redcar, North Yorkshire, set against the background of the industrial furnace of the largest steelworks in Europe and Redcar's coast line.

== Origins ==
The event was organised by Secret Millionaire David Jamilly and social entrepreneur and local boxing coach Frankie Wales, in conjunction with Redcar and Cleveland Borough Council. Frankie Wales is also the founder of Redcar Development Trust (1). The festival was set to celebrate Redcar's incredible and unique heritage of 150 years of steelmaking and the spirit of the area and people. Designed with the whole community in mind the Fire and Steel Festival offered a variety of activities and performers. The line up for the 2011 festival included fire performers, motorcycle troupes, live music, stunt displays, circus skills workshops, art and history exhibitions and the torching of a spectacular 20 ft fire sculpture. 2011 was the inaugural year and saw over two thousand attendees.

== History ==
Redcar has been inextricably linked to Steel and fire since 1917 when the Teesside Steelworks were founded.

Teesside Steelworks, which stretches from Redcar, where the largest blast furnace in Europe is located, to east Middlesbrough area are Europe's largest steelworks producing steel for the Sydney Harbour Bridge, Tyne Bridge, Auckland Harbour Bridge and many more.

The Corus Steelworks was taken over by Tata Steel in 2007 but kept the name and its position as the biggest employer in the area.

On 19 February 2010 the steelworks were mothballed causing the termination of around 17,000 contracts. The closure of Redcar's Steelworks not only had a huge impact on the local economy and employment, but also the moral of the area.

The first Fire and Steel festival took place as a tribute to Teesside's unique steel heritage and a recognition to the tenacity and spirit to the people from the area. Shortly after the inaugural Fire and Steel Festival on Thursday 24 February, the mothballed Steelworks were sold for £291m after months of negotiations with the Thai company SSI creating hundreds of new jobs in the area.
