= Kavita Oberoi =

British entrepreneur

Kavita Oberoi OBE
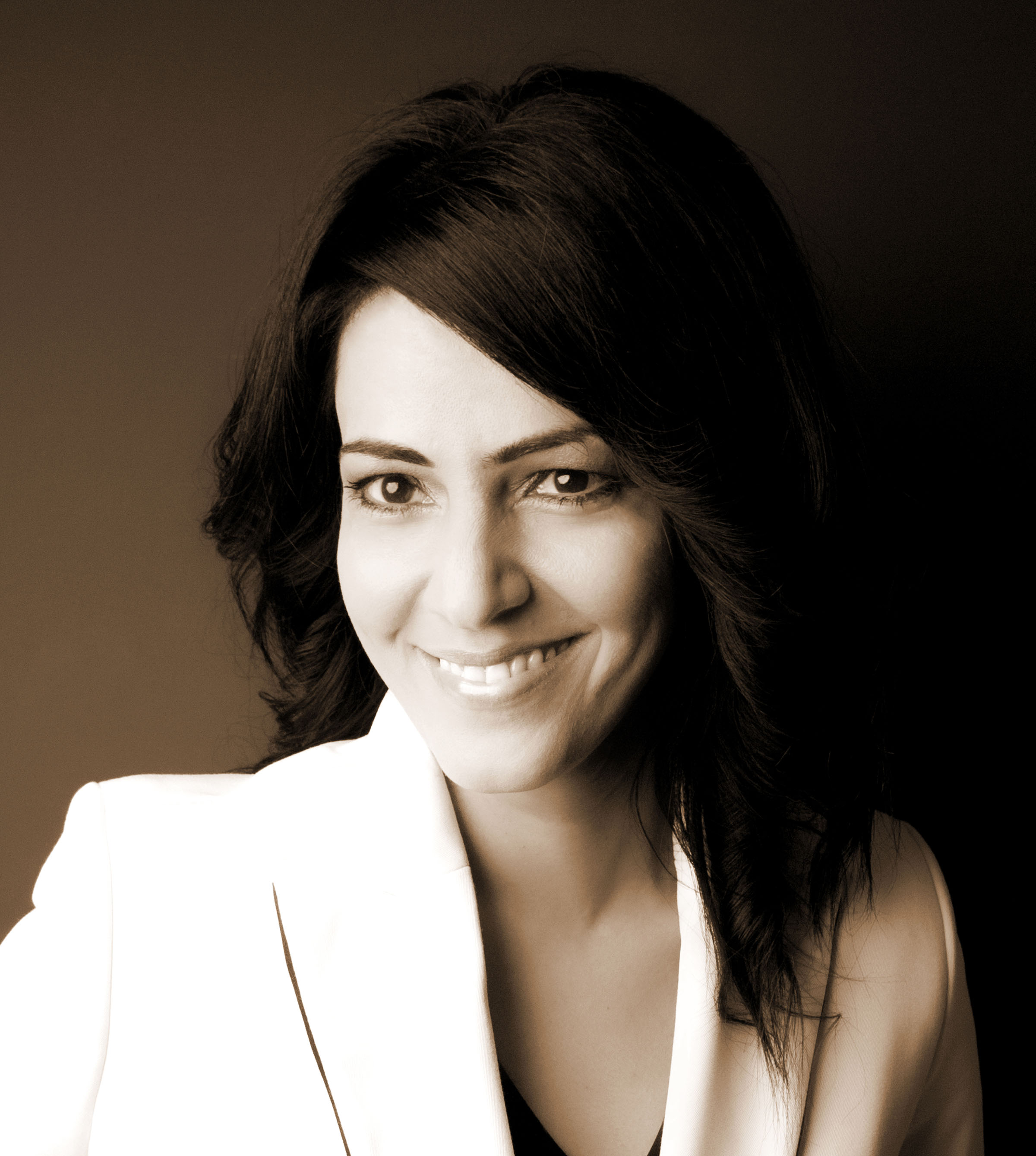
- Born: Kavita Vasdev; 27 April 1970 (age 55); Bradford, Yorkshire, England
- Education: University of Huddersfield (BSc)
- Occupation: Businesswoman
- Known for: Founder of Oberoi Consulting
- Spouse: Deven Oberoi (m. 1993)
- Children: 2

Kavita Oberoi OBE (née Vasdev; born 27 April 1970) is a British businesswoman of Indian heritage. She is the founder and managing director of Oberoi Consulting, a healthcare IT and business consultancy established in 2001.

Oberoi gained wider public recognition through her appearance on the Channel 4 television series Secret Millionaire in 2008.

== Early life and education ==
Oberoi was born Kavita Vasdev in Bradford, West Yorkshire, to an Indian family. She graduated with a first-class BSc degree in chemistry from the University of Huddersfield.

== Career ==
After graduating, Oberoi worked as a medical representative for Bayer Pharmaceuticals. In 2001, she founded Oberoi Consulting, which provides clinical audit, IT training, and business consulting services to GP practices and other healthcare organisations. The company's early clients included the pharmaceutical company Pfizer. The consultancy's clients have included GP practices, PBC clusters, private healthcare providers, primary care trusts, pharmacy groups, and pharmaceutical companies.

In August 2008, Oberoi appeared on Channel 4's Secret Millionaire, in which wealthy individuals spend time living in deprived communities before revealing their identity and making donations. She subsequently became a director of Martha's Oasis, one of the charities she supported on the programme.

In January 2010, Oberoi acquired a stake in the security company Octavian, from which she exited in January 2013.

In early 2012, Oberoi joined the ITV News Business Club, a project tracking 100 businesses across the UK. In December 2012, she launched the Oberoi Business Hub in Derby, offering serviced offices and business support for start-up companies.

== Honours and recognition ==
In 2005, Oberoi was awarded the NRI Pride of India Gold Award and received a special commendation in the Entrepreneur of the Year category at the Asian Woman of Achievement Awards. She was also awarded a Fellowship of the Royal Society of Arts.

In 2007, the NRI Institute presented Oberoi with the NRI Achiever Pinnacle Award in the Business category.

In 2009, Oberoi was named in an HBOS report as one of "Britain's 100 Most Entrepreneurial Women". She was also shortlisted for the business and commerce award at the Lloyds Bank Jewel Awards and served as a judge and mentor for the HBOS Social Entrepreneur Awards.

In April 2010, Oberoi was appointed chair of the Global Girls' Fund Board, part of the World Association of Girl Guides and Girl Scouts.

In July 2013, the University of Huddersfield awarded her an honorary doctorate for business and entrepreneurship.

She was appointed Officer of the Order of the British Empire (OBE) in the 2014 Birthday Honours for services to entrepreneurship and businesses.
