= Emily Thornberry =

British politician (born 1960)

The Right Honourable Dame Emily Thornberry DBE MP
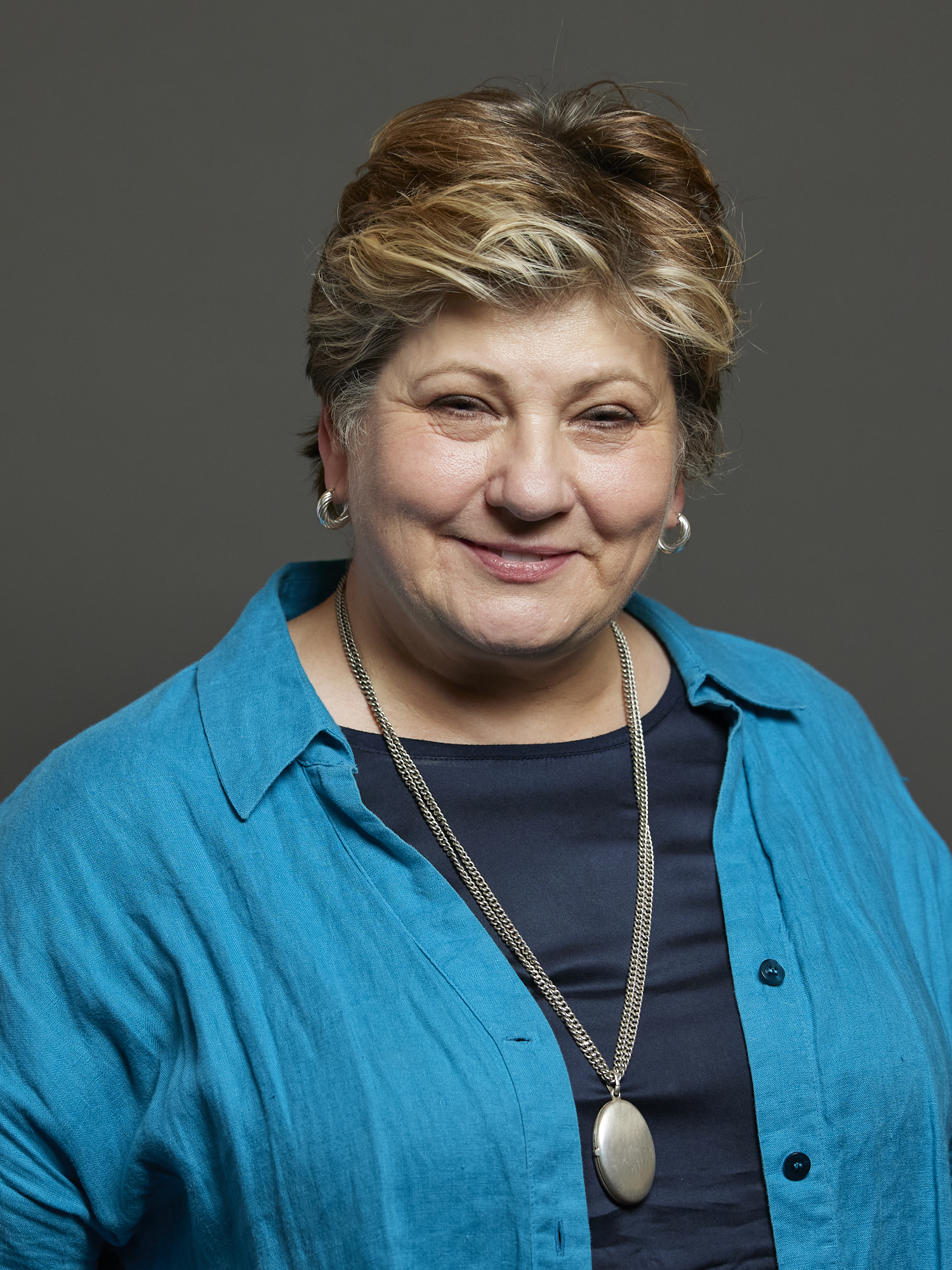
- Official portrait, 2024

Chair of the Foreign Affairs Select Committee
- Incumbent
- Assumed office 11 September 2024
- Preceded by: Alicia Kearns

Member of Parliament for Islington South and Finsbury
- Incumbent
- Assumed office 5 May 2005
- Preceded by: Chris Smith
- Majority: 15,455 (36.2%)
Shadow portfolios
Shadow Cabinet
2021–2024	Attorney General
2020–2021	International Trade
2017–2020	First Secretary of State
2016–2020	Foreign and Commonwealth Affairs
2016	Exiting the European Union
2016	Defence
2011–2014	Attorney General
Shadow Minister
2015–2016	Employment
2010–2011	Social Care
2010	Climate Change

Personal details
- Born: Emily Anne Thornberry; 27 July 1960 (age 66) Guildford, Surrey, England
- Party: Labour
- Spouse: Christopher Nugee (m. 1991)
- Children: 3
- Parents: Cedric Thornberry; Sallie Thornberry
- Education: University of Kent (LLB)
- Website: www.emilythornberry.com

Dame Emily Anne Thornberry DBE (born 27 July 1960) is a British politician who has been the Member of Parliament (MP) for Islington South and Finsbury since 2005. A member of the Labour Party, she served as Shadow Attorney General for England and Wales from 2021 until the 2024 general election, and previously from 2011 to 2014. Thornberry has also served in a number of other senior positions on Labour's front bench, namely as Shadow Foreign Secretary from 2016 to 2020, Shadow First Secretary of State from 2017 to 2020 and Shadow Secretary of State for International Trade from 2020 to 2021.

The daughter of a teacher and a diplomat, Emily Thornberry was born in Guildford, Surrey, and attended a local secondary modern school. After graduating from the University of Kent at Canterbury, she worked as a human rights lawyer from 1985 to 2005 and joined the Transport and General Workers' Union.

She was first elected to Parliament in 2005 and served as Shadow Attorney General for England and Wales in Ed Miliband's shadow cabinet from 2011 until she resigned in 2014 after sending a tweet that it was claimed mocked a house with England flags. After Jeremy Corbyn won the 2015 Labour leadership election, she was appointed Shadow Minister of State for Employment in September 2015, Shadow Secretary of State for Defence in January 2016 and Shadow Secretary of State for Foreign and Commonwealth Affairs in June 2016. She was a candidate to succeed Corbyn as Leader of the Labour Party in the 2020 leadership election but was eliminated from the race after failing to obtain the number of nominations needed.

Thornberry was appointed to Keir Starmer's shadow cabinet as Shadow Secretary of State for International Trade and Shadow President of the Board of Trade in April 2020. She was appointed Shadow Attorney General for England and Wales in November 2021, but did not receive a ministerial position in Starmer's post-election government formed in July 2024.

In the 2025 New Year Honours Thornberry was appointed a Dame Commander of the Order of the British Empire (DBE) for political and public service.

== Early life and career ==
Emily Thornberry was born on 27 July 1960 in Guildford, Surrey. Her parents were Sallie Thornberry (née Bone), a teacher, and Cedric Thornberry, a professor of international law at the London School of Economics, and later a United Nations Assistant Secretary-General. Due to her father's birth in Belfast she is an Irish citizen and Irish passport holder. When Thornberry was seven, her parents divorced and she left their home with her mother and two brothers. After this, she relied on free school meals and food parcels, and her cats were euthanised to save money. Her mother later became a Labour councillor and mayor (representing Stoke in Guildford from 1983 to 2003), and her father stood as the Labour candidate for Guildford in the 1966 general election.

Thornberry failed the eleven-plus standardized exam; consequently, she attended a secondary modern school. She left to live with her father when she was 15 until he left without warning to work for the United Nations when she was seventeen. She worked as a cleaner and a barmaid in London alongside resitting her O-Levels and taking her A-Levels. She went on to study law at the University of Kent in Canterbury, graduating in 1982, and afterwards led the students' union as an elected full-time officer. She was called to the bar at Gray's Inn and practised as a barrister specialising in human rights law from 1985 to 2005 under Michael Mansfield at Tooks Chambers.

She joined the Transport and General Workers' Union in 1985.

== Parliamentary career ==
At the 2001 general election, Thornberry stood as the Labour candidate in Canterbury, coming second with 36.9% of the vote behind the incumbent Conservative MP Julian Brazier.

=== 1st term (2005–2010) ===
Thornberry was selected as the Labour candidate for Islington South and Finsbury for the 2005 general election through an all-women shortlist of prospective candidates. She was elected to Parliament as MP for Islington South and Finsbury 39.9% of the vote and a majority of 484.

Thornberry made her maiden speech in the House of Commons on 24 May 2005. In Parliament, she was a member of the Environmental Audit Committee from 2005 to 2007 and the Communities and Local Government Committee from 2006 to 2009.

In 2006, Thornberry was criticised by the Parliamentary Commissioner for Standards Philip Mawer for adding a quote from herself into a news release by the Electoral Commission. He found that she had not broken the Parliamentary code of conduct, but that her actions had been "unwise and unfortunate".

Thornberry's main interests since becoming an MP have been in health, housing, the environment and equality. She has also spoken on the need for more affordable housing, particularly in Islington. In 2006, Thornberry introduced the Housing Association Bill, a private member's bill which sought to improve the control of housing association tenants over their landlords, with many of the ideas from this bill were taken up by the Cave Review. On environmental matters, Thornberry worked with Friends of the Earth and World Wide Fund for Nature (WWF) to campaign for a Climate Change Bill and a Marine Bill. In 2006, Thornberry won the ePolitix Award for Environment Champion of the Year after being nominated by WWF.

In May 2008, Thornberry supported a change in the law to allow single women and lesbian couples to seek in vitro fertilisation treatment.

In 2009, she was appointed as a ministerial aide in the Department of Energy and Climate Change and attended the Copenhagen Summit in December that year with Joan Ruddock and Ed Miliband.

=== 2nd term (2010–2015) ===
At the 2010 general election, Thornberry was re-elected as MP for Islington South and Finsbury with an increased vote share of 42.3% and an increased majority of 3,569.

Thornberry was promoted to Shadow Minister for the Department of Energy and Climate Change soon after the general election. She missed out on a place in Labour's shadow cabinet, then elected by Labour MPs, by one vote. She was instead promoted to the role of shadow care minister under the shadow health secretary John Healey.

In April 2011, Thornberry surveyed all the local government directors of adult social care and highlighted the pressures on care for the elderly by the coalition government's cuts to local authority funds. In June 2011 Thornberry criticised the coalition government's lack of action over failing care home operator Southern Cross, calling for action and that the government put in place a plan B should the operator fail. She criticised the government over the Winterbourne View care home abuse scandal, calling for an investigation into the affair.

In July 2011, Thornberry challenged prime minister David Cameron over his false claims about wages at Islington Council, campaigning against government measures which she said had exacerbated child poverty in Islington, and answering over 1,000 enquiries a month from constituents.

Thornberry was appointed shadow attorney general in October 2011, which allowed her to attend shadow cabinet meetings. She called for action by Dominic Grieve over Applied Language Solutions' failure to provide interpreters for court proceedings.

Thornberry resigned her shadow cabinet position on 20 November 2014, shortly after polls closed in the Rochester and Strood by-election. Earlier in the day, she had received criticism after tweeting a photograph as voting was taking place of a house in the constituency adorned with three flags of St. George, the smaller of which incorporated the colours of West Ham United F.C. and showed the owner's white van parked outside on the driveway, under the caption "Image from #Rochester", provoking accusations of snobbery. She was criticised by fellow Labour Party MPs, including leader Ed Miliband, who said her tweet conveyed a "sense of disrespect", Chris Bryant, who said that it broke the "first rule of politics" and Simon Danczuk, who said that the party had been "hijacked by the north London liberal elite". Prime Minister David Cameron said the tweet was "completely appalling", implying that she was "sneering at people who work hard, are patriotic and love their country", and BBC political editor Nick Robinson said the tweet was "the most extraordinary self-inflicted wound I have seen an opposition party inflict on themselves in many, many years."

=== 3rd term (2015–2017) ===
At the 2015 general election, Thornberry was again re-elected with an increased vote share of 50.9% and an increased majority of 12,708.

Thornberry was one of 36 Labour MPs to nominate Jeremy Corbyn as a candidate in the Labour leadership election of 2015, though she later stated that she would be supporting Yvette Cooper.

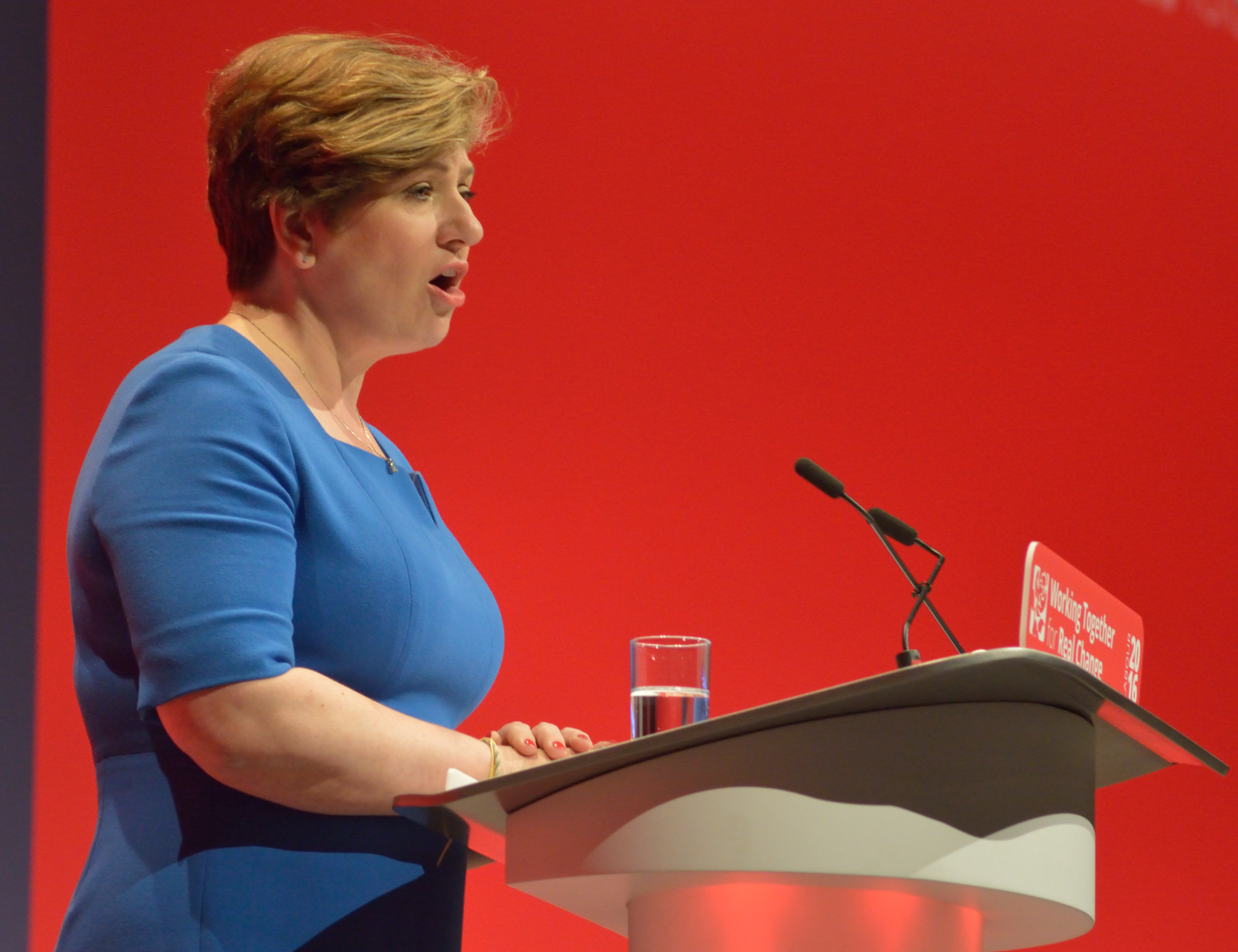
Shadow Foreign Secretary speech at the 2016 Labour Party Conference

In September 2015, she was appointed as the shadow Minister of State for Employment by the new Labour leader Jeremy Corbyn.

She was promoted to shadow defence secretary in January 2016, replacing Maria Eagle. Thornberry advocated spending money on the army rather than on the UK's Trident nuclear programme. On being appointed, Thornberry was interviewed by the British Forces Broadcasting Service, where she defended her appointment, saying she had "quite a lot more experience than people might think I do. I was made an honorary lieutenant colonel when I was doing court-martials [sic] when I was a barrister so I have a certain amount of experience of the military there." During her role as shadow defence secretary, Thornberry conducted a review of defence policy, including the role of the nuclear deterrent, which was delayed following the 2016 United Kingdom European Union membership referendum. During a private Labour discussion about the nuclear deterrent, Thornberry asked what "DEFCON One", a status of the United States nuclear defence rating, meant.

Thornberry was promoted to Shadow Foreign Secretary in June 2016 after Corbyn fired Hilary Benn. She held the role of Shadow Brexit Secretary concurrently until Keir Starmer took on the role later that year. She accused Sky News presenter Dermot Murnaghan of sexism after he asked her to name the French Foreign Minister (Jean-Marc Ayrault) and the president of South Korea, which she was unable to do.

In October 2016, Thornberry stated that she opposed Britain's involvement in the Saudi Arabian–led intervention in Yemen against the Shia Houthis. She said that "while Saudi Arabia will remain a valued strategic, security and economic ally in the years to come, our support for their forces in Yemen must be suspended until the alleged violations of international humanitarian law in that conflict have been fully and independently investigated".

=== 4th term (2017–2019) ===
At the snap 2017 general election, Thornberry was again re-elected with an increased vote share of 62.8% and an increased majority of 20,263. Following the election, she was given the additional role of Shadow First Secretary of State, effectively acting as Corbyn's number 2.

In May 2018 Thornberry said support in Syria for the country's president, Bashar al-Assad, had been "underestimated" in the West. In October 2018 Thornberry criticised Theresa May's government's response to Jamal Khashoggi's disappearance as "too little, too late". She said: "Imagine how this government would have reacted if either Russia or Iran had abducted—and in all likelihood murdered—one of their dissident journalists within the sovereign territory of another country".

=== 5th term (2019–2024) ===
At the 2019 general election, Thornberry was again re-elected, with a decreased vote share of 56.3% and a decreased majority of 17,328.

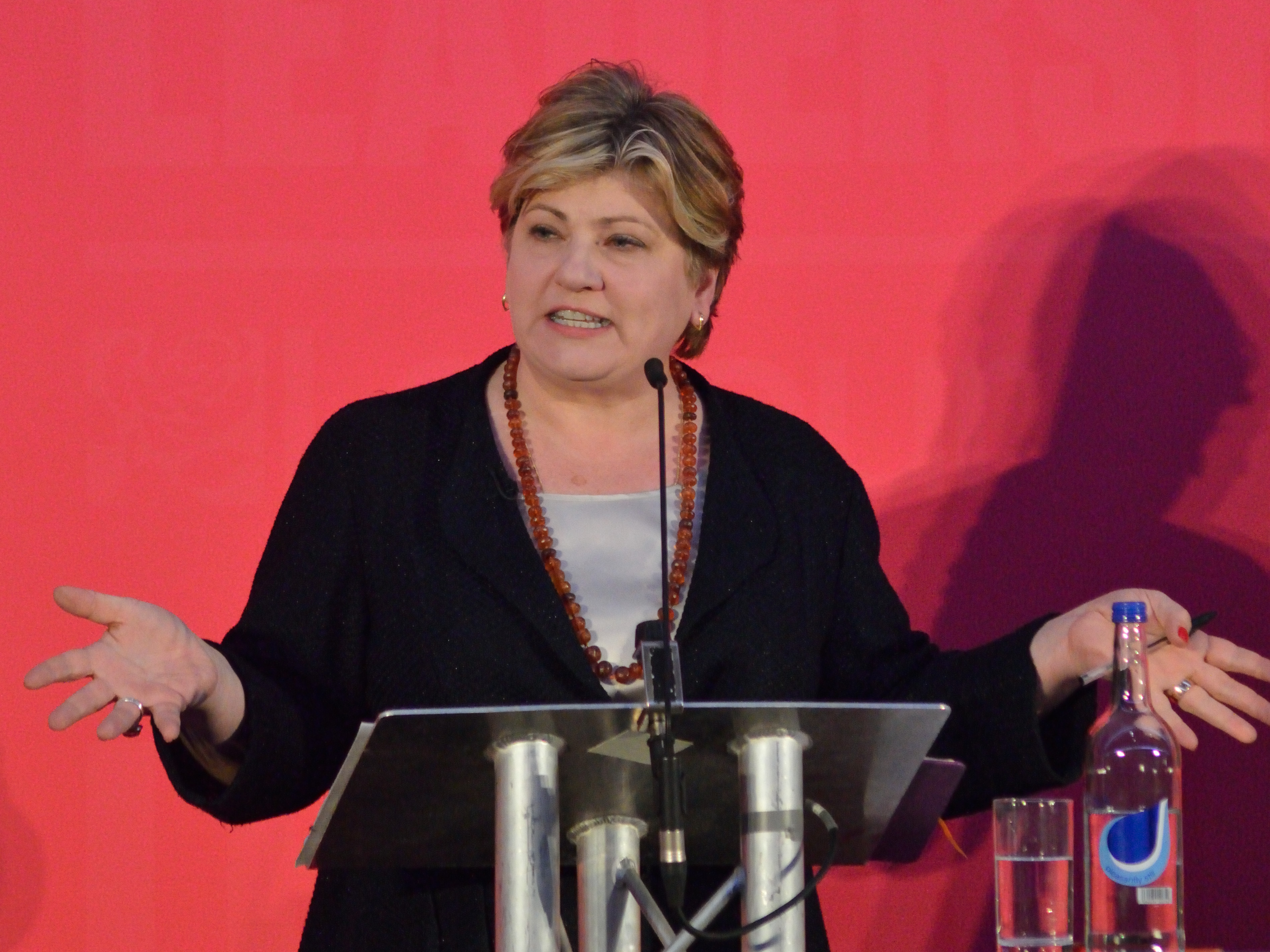
Speaking at a 2020 leadership election hustings

After Corbyn announced he was stepping down as leader, Thornberry was the first to announce that she would be standing for the position of leader of the Labour Party. Defeated Labour MP Caroline Flint appeared on Sophy Ridge on Sunday and accused Thornberry of saying that Brexit voters in Northern England were 'stupid'. Thornberry appeared on ITV News and accused Flint of 'making up shit about her' and threatened to take legal action. She was eventually eliminated from the leadership election after failing to achieve enough nominations from constituency parties or affiliated groups.

Following the killing of Qasem Soleimani in the 2020 Baghdad International Airport airstrike, Thornberry condemned the actions of the United States government. She said that she shed no tears over the death, but was fearful of escalating tensions in the region.

Thornberry was replaced as Shadow Foreign Secretary by Lisa Nandy upon the election of Keir Starmer as Leader of the Labour Party. Thornberry remained on the Official Opposition frontbench, becoming the new Shadow Secretary of State for International Trade in succession to Barry Gardiner, and said on Twitter that, "It's been a pleasure to work with Barry Gardiner these past four years ... I hope I can take the fight to the government on International Trade as effectively as he did, and I'll be very lucky to have his advice".

In late December 2020, Thornberry voted for the European Union (Future Relationship) Act 2020, in line with the Labour Chief Whip.

In the November 2021 shadow cabinet reshuffle, Thornberry was appointed Shadow Attorney General for England and Wales.

In February 2022 Thornberry was re-selected to be the Labour candidate for Islington South and Finsbury at the 2024 general election.

In the aftermath of Hamas' October 7 attacks against Israel, Thornberry responded "I think Israel has an absolute right to defend itself against terrorism," when queried over Israel's decision to cut off the Gaza Strip from water, electricity, and food.

=== 6th term (2024–) ===
At the 2024 general election, Thornberry was again re-elected, with a decreased vote share of 53.7% and a decreased majority of 15,455.

With the formation of the Starmer ministry, Thornberry was not appointed a minister and returned to the backbenches. This was despite having held the position of Shadow Attorney General for six years under Starmer and Ed Miliband. Instead the post of Attorney General for England and Wales went unexpectedly to Richard Hermer, who was given a life peerage. Thornbury's disappointment at this apparent snub was widely reported.

In July 2024, Thornberry was one of five politicians to cover for James O'Brien's radio show on LBC, as part of the station's "Guest Week".

In September 2024, Thornberry refused to confirm whether Israel was committing war crimes but defended the British government's decision to enact a partial ban on arms sales to Israel, saying "we want to be on the right side of the law". On 11 September, Thornberry was elected Chair of the Foreign Affairs Committee by vote in the House of Commons.

In October 2024, when asked whether starving northern Gaza would constitute a war crime, Thornberry responded that there had been war crimes on "all sides", naming Hamas and Iran.

In March 2025, Thornberry criticised the Israeli government for breaking a ceasefire deal between it and Hamas, alleging that Netanyahu resumed hostilities to remain in power. Calling for a political solution to the Gaza war, she refused to support sanctions against Israel. She also noted on the public record in March 2025 that she buys Israeli goods as a means to support Israel, stating in a Foreign Affairs Committee on The Israeli-Palestinian conflict, HC 488, that "I have always gone out of my way to support Israel, and I will buy Israeli goods".

In May 2025, Thornberry criticised Israel and said it had no right to refuse to allow aid and food into Gaza, adding that innocent children should not be starved to death. She also called for the United Kingdom to recognise Palestine and referred to the Israeli government as "far-right".

In August 2025, Thornberry wrote "This Ambassador is clearly an idiot" on X (formerly known as Twitter) in response to a post by the United States ambassador to Israel, Mike Huckabee, which criticised the British government's opposition to Israeli plans to occupy Gaza City and expel a million Palestinians.

Thornberry emerged as the frontrunner in the 2025 Labour Party deputy leadership election that was triggered by the resignation of Angela Rayner following a tax scandal. She criticised the party leadership over its refusal to listen to members and argued that the government had made too many mistakes, including on Gaza and welfare. However, after garnering just 13 nominations from fellow members of the Parliamentary Labour Party, falling short of the 80 nominations needed, she announced her withdrawal from the contest.

== Campaigns ==
=== Affordable housing ===
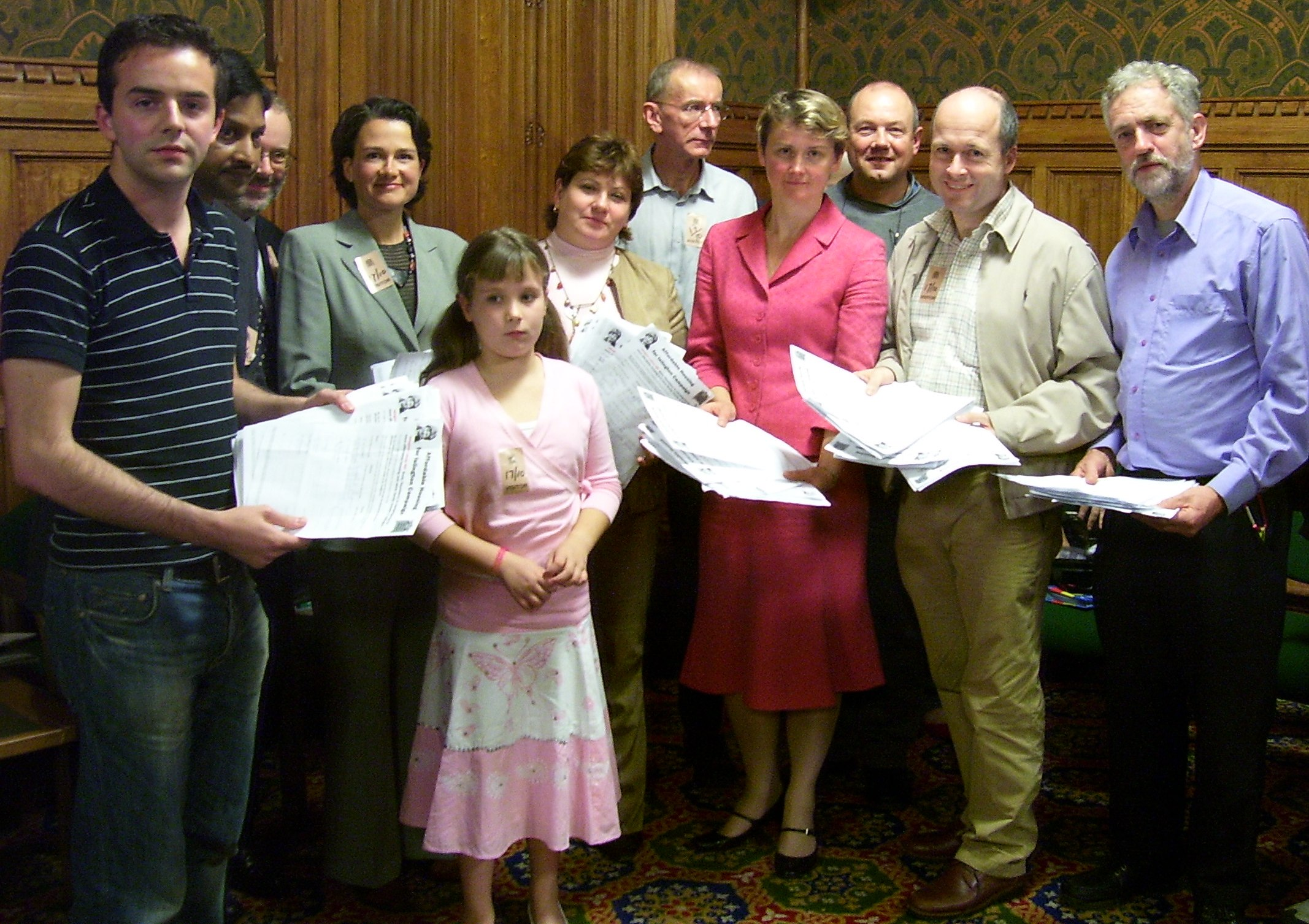
Thornberry, Corbyn and local councillors present Yvette Cooper with a petition from Islington residents for more affordable housing, 19 October 2006.

Thornberry's constituency is in the London Borough of Islington, which has disproportionately high house prices and private sector rents. She has supported measures by Islington Council to free up under-occupied homes by supporting tenants to downsize and to stop foreign investors from buying new homes and leaving them empty. She has also called for a greater degree of control over private sector rents and more support for social house-building. Thornberry has frequently campaigned for a greater commitment to affordable and social housing. She was criticised when the local Islington Tribune newspaper discovered that her husband had bought a former social house which was being let to her aides. Thornberry said the purchase was "not about property speculation".

In 2014 Thornberry clashed with Boris Johnson, the mayor of London, over the proposed redevelopments of the Mount Pleasant Mail Centre, the sorting office run by the Royal Mail, and the Clerkenwell Fire Station, both in her constituency. Camden and Islington councils sought to require a high proportion of the resulting new homes to be made available for social rent, but Johnson overturned this and allowed homes designated as "affordable" to charge rents of up to 80 per cent of market rates. Thornberry criticised Johnson, describing his definition of affordability as "nonsense", and called for at least 50% of homes in the new developments to be made available for social rent.

=== Statue of Emily Davison ===
In 2013, the 100th anniversary of the death of the suffragette Emily Davison, Thornberry called for a statue commemorating Davison in Parliament. She arranged a public meeting to discuss options for a memorial, attended by around 800 people, and settled on the idea of a statue as an appropriate memorial, pointing out that there were very few statues of female politicians and activists in Parliament.

=== Equal pay ===
In March 2015, Thornberry launched a campaign for a new Equal Pay Act. She said that, 45 years after the original Equal Pay Act was passed in 1970, women still earned 19% less than men on average.

== Personal life ==
Thornberry has lived in Islington since the early 1990s. In July 1991 she married Christopher Nugee, of Wilberforce Chambers, in Tower Hamlets, and they have two sons and a daughter. Nugee later became Queen's Counsel, then a High Court Judge, when he was knighted, at which point Thornberry became entitled to be styled Lady Nugee, but does not use the style. Nugee later became a Lord Justice of Appeal.

Thornberry also part-owns properties in Guildford and South London; her property portfolio "is believed to be worth £4.6 million."

In April 2005, it was reported that Thornberry and Nugee had sent their son to the partially selective Dame Alice Owen's state school 14 miles (23 km) from their home and outside her constituency. The school was formerly based in Islington and reserved a quota of 10% of its places for Islington pupils. The Labour Party opposed selection and Thornberry was criticised over the matter as a result. Later, Thornberry's daughter attended the same school.

Thornberry was appointed a Dame Commander of the Order of the British Empire (DBE) in the 2025 New Year Honours for political and public service.

Parliament of the United Kingdom
Preceded by Chris Smith	Member of Parliament for Islington South and Finsbury; 2005–present	Incumbent
Political offices
Preceded by Charles Hendry	Shadow Minister for Energy and Climate Change; 2010	Succeeded by Luciana Berger
New office	Shadow Minister for Social Care; 2010	Succeeded by Liz Kendall
Preceded by The Baroness Scotland of Asthal	Shadow Attorney General for England and Wales; 2011–2014	Succeeded by The Lord Bach
Preceded by Stephen Timms	Shadow Minister of State for Employment; 2015–2016	Succeeded by Nick Thomas-Symonds
Preceded by Maria Eagle	Shadow Secretary of State for Defence; 2016	Succeeded by Clive Lewis
Preceded by Hilary Benn	Shadow Foreign Secretary; 2016–2020	Succeeded by Lisa Nandy
New office	Shadow Secretary of State for Exiting the European Union; 2016	Succeeded by Keir Starmer
Vacant Title last held by Angela Eagle	Shadow First Secretary of State; 2017–2020	Succeeded by Angela Rayner
Preceded by Barry Gardiner	Shadow Secretary of State for International Trade; 2020–2021	Succeeded by Nick Thomas-Symonds
Preceded by Barry Gardiner	Shadow President of the Board of Trade; 2020–2021	Succeeded by Nick Thomas-Symonds
Preceded by The Lord Falconer of Thoroton	Shadow Attorney General for England and Wales; 2021–2024	Succeeded by Jeremy Wright
