= Sunny Govan Radio =

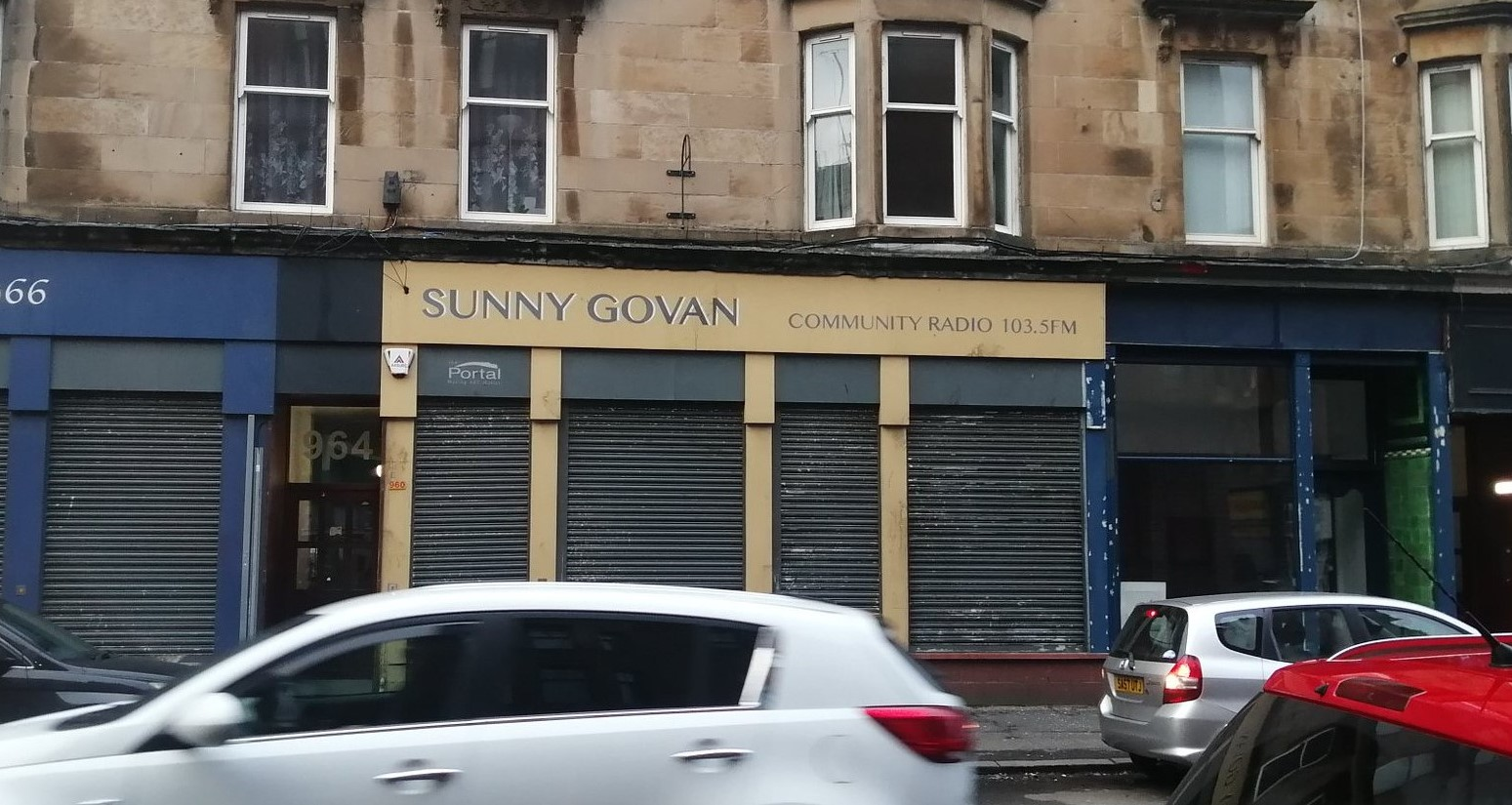

Glasgow; Scotland
- Frequency: 103.5 MHz

Ownership
- Owner: Sunny Govan Community Media Group

History
- First air date: 1 August 1998

Links
- Website: www.sunnyg.org

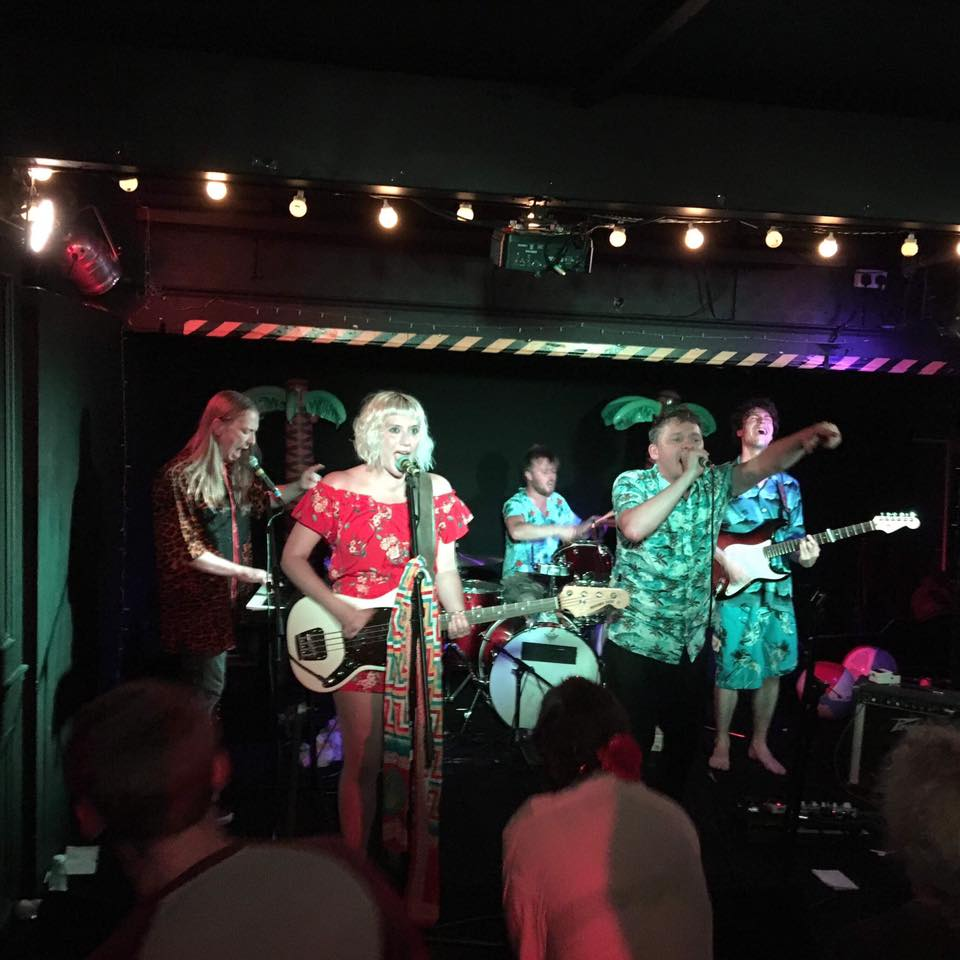
The Girobabies playing a Sunny G fundraiser in June 2018

Sunny Govan Radio, also known as "Sunny G", is a community radio station based in Govan, Glasgow, Scotland. It is run by the charity Sunny Govan Community Radio Group.

== History ==
The station's first FM broadcasts took place over two weeks in August 1998, in an effort to challenge negative stereotypes about the area. Following positive reception and successful fundraising, this was followed by a second broadcast over three weeks in December 2001. The station subsequently began broadcasting digitally, and was awarded a Community Radio license for full time FM broadcast in March 2007.

Run by the charity Sunny Govan Community Radio Group, the station uses radio to provide training and development opportunities to local people. Programming supports the local arts, culture and music scene, but has also featured high-profile interviewees such as Rebecca Adlington, Ken Dodd, and Nicola Sturgeon, in her capacity as First Minister for Scotland, and MSP for Glasgow Southside. The interview, which received mainstream media coverage, was described by presenter Anne Hughes as a lifechanging moment.

In 2004, the station was recognised by BT Group for "Innovative Use of Broadband Technology." The station featured on The Secret Millionaire in 2012, and was awarded £15,000 by the episode's millionaire Gordon McAlpine. In 2020 the station was voted a High Street Hero for Glasgow in a campaign run by The Herald newspaper.

Notable presenters have included station co-founder and Scottish hip hop producer Steg G.

== Community ==
The station has a history of community involvement and support for the grassroots music scene in Glasgow. Presenters have included local artists and musicians, such as Sarah "Sindigo" Simpson. The station offers training for those who wish to get involved in radio, and all presenters are volunteers. In 2011, the station was involved in a community twinning project organised by Oxfam, which brought together people from South Uist and Govan. In 2014 presenter Ross Tomlinson, at the age of 11, was considered to have been Scotland's youngest DJ. Darren "Loki" McGarvey has called the station a "radio legend", and made guest appearances on the station early in his career.

== Closure ==
The station temporarily closed its premises in March 2020 due to the COVID-19 pandemic. In January 2021, the station announced that they were at risk of closure, due to the loss of regular income streams such as partnership programmes and live music fundraisers. A crowdfunder was launched, and the campaign received public support from Darren McGarvey, MSP Annie Wells, and Councillor Mhairi Hunter.
