= Scottish hip-hop =

Music genre

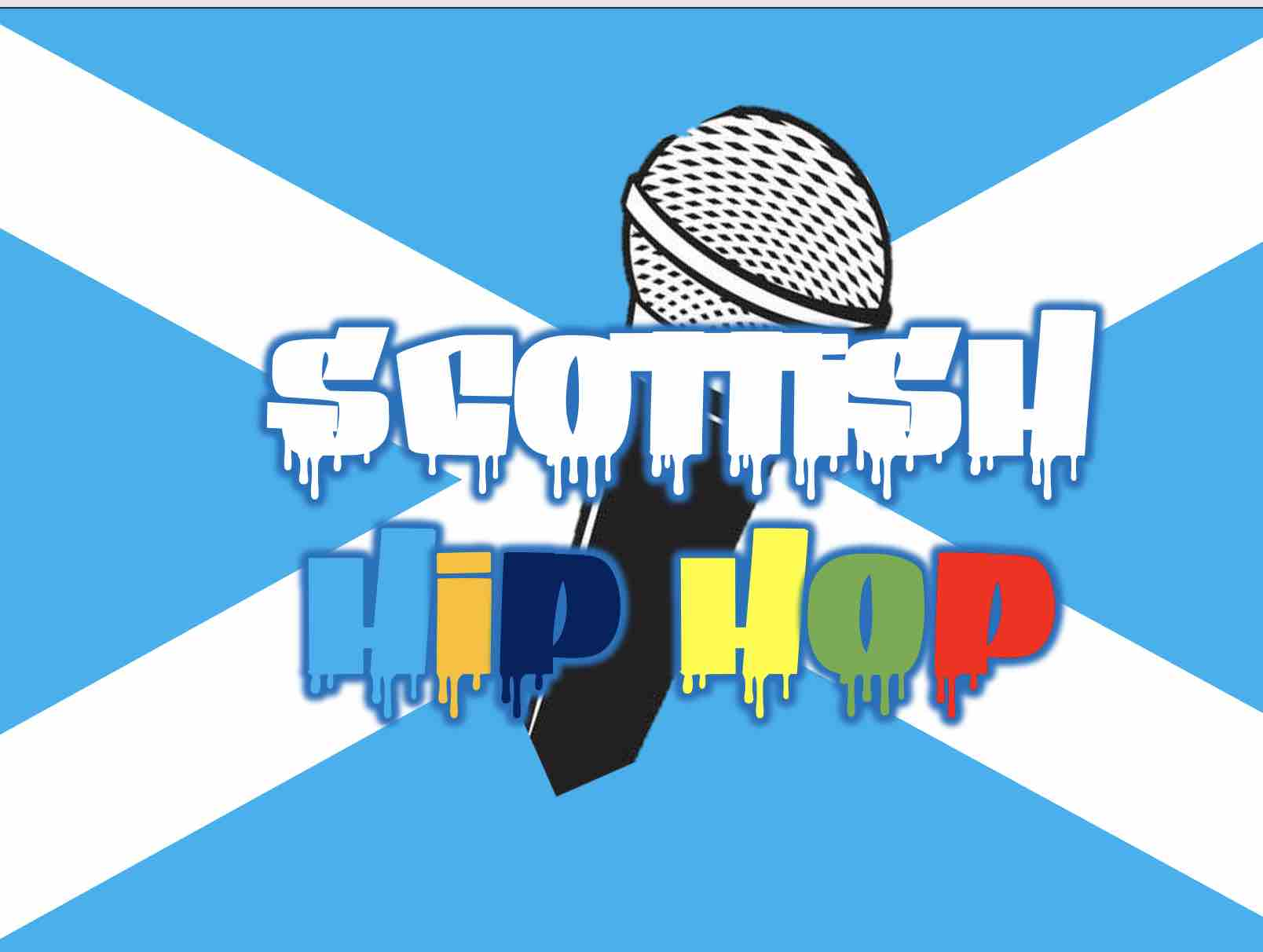
- Scottish hip-hop
- Stylistic origins: Hip-hop, urban
- Cultural origins: Early to mid-1980s, Scotland
- Typical instruments: Turntable, synthesizer, rapping, drum machine, sampler, guitar, computer
- Derivative forms: Trip hop

Other topics
- Drum and bass, dubstep, grime, UK garage

Scottish hip-hop is the Scottish manifestation of British hip-hop culture in Scotland, comprising the five elements of MCing, DJing, beatboxing, graffiti and b-boying.

== History ==
In the 1980s, elements of hip-hop culture had spread to Scotland. Scottish actor and stand-up comedian Johnny Beattie claimed to be "Scotland's first rap star". His song "The Glasgow Rap" was released in 1983 and received some chart success at the time.

In the late 1980s artists such as II Tone Committee, Bill Drummond, Krack Free Media, Dope Inc and into the early 1990s with Blacka'nized, NorthernXposure, Zulu Syndicate, Eastborn, Major Threat, All Time High and UTI (Under The Influence) laid the groundwork for a Scottish hip-hop subculture, rapping consciously about their own lives and problems in their own voices rather than emulating American rappers of the time. The first Scottish hip-hop on vinyl was The Frontal Attack, released by Dope Inc in 1991. In Glasgow, Steg G & the Freestyle Master were producing work that added a west coast twist to Scottish rap.

During the early 2000s, Dundonian rap duo Silibil N' Brains became known for pretending to be from San Jacinto, California in order to obtain a record deal in London - this was leveraged by frequent performances in and around London, including a support slot for D12. The duo eventually split up in 2005 and returned to Scotland, however briefly reunited in 2013.

In the early 2010s, a defined scene became more visible in the mainstream for various reasons.

Firstly, the emergence of "written" battle rap as a defined artform led to greater exposure of the scene as whole, thanks to the creation of battle events in both Edinburgh & Glasgow by Nity Gritz, co-hosted by Werd (S.O.S) This even culminated in a Scotsman becoming the de facto UK battle rap champion when Soul became the Don't Flop champion in 2015. Indeed Flyting was a medieval Scottish poetic tradition of ritualised insult battles between poets, which reached its peak i the 15th and 16th century.. These duels, like the famous one between William Dunbar and Walter Kennedy, were public competitions of verbal wit and creativity, with insults often focused on cowardice or other personal failings. The practice is considered a precursor to modern rap battles, though it was rooted in a more formal, courtly tradition of structured verse.

Several artists within the hip-hop community also became galvanised by the 2014 Scottish independence referendum. The likes of Loki and Stanley Odd championed the Yes vote. The former emerged as an activist and cultural voice on behalf of the hip-hop community, while the latter went viral with their single "Son, I Voted Yes".

Elsewhere, several acts within the scene broke into the mainstream. The likes of Hector Bizerk and The LaFontaines earned prestigious slots at the T in the Park festival, as well as widespread critical recognition. Meanwhile, Young Fathers, a hip-hop group from Edinburgh, achieved UK-wide success with their album "Dead", for which they won the Mercury prize. While Edinburgh's Madhat McGore pushed the music further down south, working with English acts and appearing on Charlie Sloth's BBC Fire in the Booth. Eastborn toured Europe, Australia, the US and China, as well as being a guest slot presenter on BBC 1xtra.

Edinburgh Born Rob Mitchell leads Abstract Orchestra, a British hip-hop orchestra that are known for reworking classic American hip-hop and working with both UK and US artists.

In July 2015, the Audio Soup festival in Dunbar became the first to dedicate an entire stage to Scottish hip-hop artists.

=== Breakdancing ===
From the inception of hip-hop culture in Scotland, break dancing became a popular dance form. Castle Rocks was Scotland's biggest ever bboy competition and attracted competitors from Korea, Brazil, France, Belgium, the Netherlands, Norway etc. and across the UK. It was established in 2005 and ended in 2012. Some prominent Scottish crews (past and present): Flyin' Jalapeños Crew, Laser city crew, 141 Crew, White City Breakers, Random Askpektz.
