= Dawn Gibbins =

British entrepreneur and philanthropist (1961–2022)

Dawn Gibbins MBE
- Born: 1958; Congleton, Cheshire, England
- Died: 11 February 2022 (aged 63–64)
- Occupations: Entrepreneur and philanthropist

Dawn Gibbins MBE (Later Dawn De Vivre) (1961 – 11 February 2022) was a British entrepreneur and philanthropist.

== Career ==
Dawn Gibbins founded commercial and industrial flooring company Flowcrete in Sandbach in 1982 alongside her late father, Peter Gibbins. She oversaw its international and domestic growth, covering 30 offices worldwide and 12 manufacturing sites in the UK, Asia, Sweden, Belgium, South Africa, US and Brazil. Flowcrete was sold to RPM in 2010.

Following the sale, Gibbins launched a flooring business aimed at homes, Barefoot Living, based in Congleton, South Cheshire, England, along with a social enterprise Barefoot Feng Shui.

== Death ==
Dawn Gibbins died at home on 11 February 2022.

== Secret Millionaire ==
Gibbins was featured in a 2009 episode of the Secret Millionaire Channel 4 TV series, donating £250,000 to three Bristol-based charities. Gibbins states that the experience of spending 8 days living amongst those in need "changed her life". Charities that received donations at the end of the program were 'The One25 Project', a charity that seeks to enable women who are abused and trapped in a life of street sex-work, the 'Wild Goose Café' who feed and care for the homeless, sex workers and those battling addiction and the 'Teenage Parents Project' who offer support and guidance to young parents.

In 2010 Gibbins returned to Bristol to film The Secret Millionaire Changed My Life, a follow-up to the original broadcast. In the program, broadcast on 11 January 2011, Gibbins explained that her experience working with her supported charities had changed her life. Talking about the £125,000 donation to the Wild Goose Café, Gibbins explained that she found Assistant Manager Lisa Mannion's 'dream' compelling and she 'wanted to make this girl's dream come true'.

== Awards ==
Her career achievements included the award of an honorary doctorate from Manchester Metropolitan University in 2004, the Veuve Clicquot Business Woman of the Year accolade in 2003 and an MBE in 1994. She was made a ‘Pioneer to the Life of our Nation’ by Her Majesty The Queen.
