= David Pearl (businessman) =

British businessman (born 1944)

- Born: October 1944 (age 81); Luton, Bedfordshire, England
- Occupations: Real estate investor, businessman, property developer
- Years active: 1978–present

David Pearl is a British property developer from North London. He previously appeared on the Channel 4 show The Secret Millionaire.

== Early life ==
Pearl was born in Luton, Bedfordshire in October 1944. His family later moved to Stamford Hill in London, where his father Harry worked in a millinery factory. Pearl has described the family's financial struggles in interviews. He left school at age 15, working as a packer for a clothing company and as a part-time casino croupier.

== Ventures ==
=== Pearl & Coutts ===
In 1965, at age 19, Pearl set up the property management and letting agency Pearl & Coutts. Within three years, he began buying properties to let at auction. One of his early properties carried an interest-free mortgage of £7 a week, which he let for £10. His mother later used her home as collateral to secure a bank loan for his third property. The company initially focused on residential properties in Hackney and Islington before expanding into commercial property in Central London and the West End.

=== Structadene Ltd ===
Pearl created Structadene Limited, a limited company encompassing Pearl & Coutts, in 1978. Structadene traded throughout the early 1980s recession, adopting an acquisition strategy focused on less traditional areas for property investment. In 1980, the company acquired the Jesus Hospital Estate, a 350-house development in Bethnal Green, for £1.2 million. As property values rose, the broader area, including Fitzrovia, became known as NoHo. Structadene also owned buildings along Great Portland Street and Great Titchfield Street.

In 2006, the Sunday Times ranked Structadene #65 in its "Profit Track" list of top 100 companies, estimating its profit increase between 2001 and 2004 at 63%. The report attributed this to diversified commercial holdings and digitisation of management operations. By late 2007, Structadene's annual report listed 68% of its portfolio value in London and 12% in South East England. Nearly half the properties were office spaces, followed by rental units.

Structadene’s 2008 annual report listed financing from 20 banks and building societies. Group turnover, including joint ventures, reached £102,519,735, with net assets at £152,020,063 and reserves of £102,329,048. Since then, Structadene has focused on joint ventures, overseeing around 200 joint venture entities by 2010. Between October 2009 and February 2010, Structadene sold up to £50 million of its portfolio, an unusual move for a company known for holding assets long-term.

== Public image ==
Pearl was described in a 2003 interview with The Lawyer as an "old school" businessman who preferred a "gentleman’s agreement" to routine legal outsourcing. Auctioneer Duncan Moir has said Pearl often buys property he personally finds appealing, "as though he were a collector, rather than an investor". His fashion sense has been described as "perennially dressed down" and "famously scruffy". In 2006, he stated he spent around £91 a year on clothing.

Pearl appeared in a 2007 episode of Secret Millionaire, posing as a new volunteer at Queen Alexandra Hospital in Portsmouth. At the end of the programme, he donated £50,000 to various recipients, including a volunteer and organisations supporting stroke rehabilitation and cancer care.

== Controversies ==
In 2000, Structadene sued Hackney Council under the Local Government Act 1972. A high court judge found the Council had acted illegally in selling 12 commercial units to tenants for £40,000 after rejecting Structadene's earlier £100,000 offer, contrary to its duty to obtain the best price.

In 2007, Structadene bid for a portfolio of 277 properties from Islington London Borough Council. Local press valued the sale at £45 million despite Structadene’s £70 million offer. Some tenants expressed concern about rent rises, and two property traders were reportedly unable to complete bids due to tight deadlines. Structadene stated they would discuss rent issues with each tenant "to keep the unique nature of the borough".

== Personal life ==
Pearl is the vice president of Tottenham Hotspur. According to the Sunday Times Rich List in 2019, he was worth £456 million, an increase of £57 million from 2018.
