= Cedric Thornberry =

British lawyer and United Nations official

- Thornberry in 1999
- Born: Cedric Henry Reid Thornberry; 22 June 1936; Belfast, Northern Ireland
- Died: 6 May 2014 (aged 77)
- Education: Methodist College Belfast
- Alma mater: St Catharine's College, Cambridge
- Spouse: Sallie Bone (divorced)
- Children: 6 (including Emily Thornberry)

Cedric Henry Reid Thornberry (22 June 1936 – 6 May 2014) was a Northern Irish international lawyer and Assistant-Secretary-General of the United Nations, for which he worked for 17 years. He spent most of his United Nations service in international peace keeping in Cyprus, the Middle East, the former Yugoslavia and Somalia.

== Background ==
Thornberry was born in Belfast, the son of Laylee Thornberry, a primary school headteacher and his wife Lila, where he attended Finaghy Primary School and Methodist College. He studied law at St Catharine's College, Cambridge, and graduated first with a BA and then with an LLB (now the LLM) and became a barrister in 1959. Thornberry taught at Cambridge University from 1958, and at the London School of Economics from 1960. He was a foreign correspondent for The Guardian in Greece and was a practising human rights lawyer. He was one of the founders of the Northern Ireland Civil Rights Association in 1968. In the 1970s, he represented many applicants at the European Court of Human Rights.

He was the father of Labour MP Emily Thornberry who has described how he abandoned his family and left them in poverty. He divorced her mother, Sallie (née Bone), circa 1967–68 and was married and divorced three more times, having three more children.

He stood for the Labour Party in Guildford in 1966.

== United Nations ==
Cedric Thornberry joined the United Nations in 1978 and became involved in the internationally supervised settlement of the Namibia question. He became Chief of staff of the United Nations Transition Assistance Group (UNTAG). During UNTAG, he was the Director of the Office of the Special Representative of the Secretary-General in Namibia, Martti Ahtisaari, and responsible for co-ordination of the Mission’s day-to-day political operation.

Thornberry also served as the Senior Political and Legal Adviser to UNFICYP and to UNTSO, and was Director of Administration and Management at UN headquarters for four years. He was Director of UNPROFOR Civil Affairs at the beginning of the Mission in February 1992, and shortly afterwards became Assistant-Secretary-General of the United Nations when he was made Deputy Chief of Mission of the 50,000-person UN operation in ex-Yugoslavia as well as senior negotiator with all of the Balkan parties. Until the appointment of an SRSG, he was in charge of UNPROFOR’s political, civil, legal and police activities. He remained head of UNPROFOR’s Civil Affairs until early 1994.

== Consultant ==
Thornberry was a consultant to NATO in the exercises it conducts with the Partnership for Peace countries and a visiting professor at King's College in London.

== Publications ==
Cedric Thornberry published several books and contributed many articles for publication in international journals, including:

- A Nation Is Born: The Inside Story of Namibia's Independence
- The UN Security Council: From the Cold War to the 21st Century
- "Peacekeepers, Humanitarian Aid, and Civil Conflicts"
- Development of International Peace-keeping
- Peace Keeping, Peace Making and Human Rights
