= David King (theatre producer) =

English composer and producer of musical theatre

David King is an English entrepreneur and producer of musical theatre.

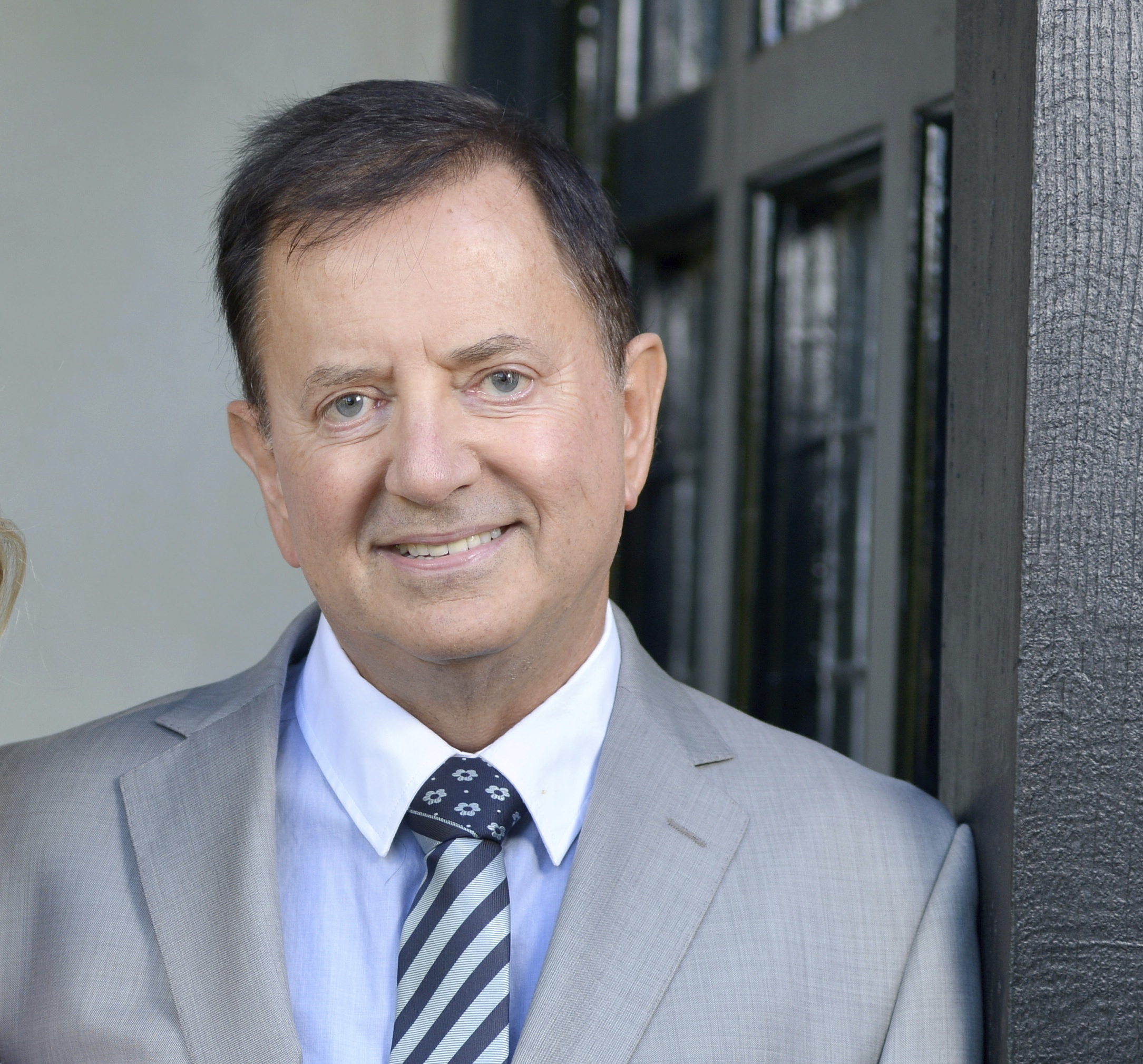
Theatre producer David King

King has achieved international success in the entertainment industry, and his management of 25 theatre companies performing his shows worldwide has been referred to as "one of the biggest theatrical organisations in the industry " King regularly travels the globe with his many productions. In the last year, his shows have toured Australia, New Zealand, Manilla, Saudi Arabia, Japan, China, East and western Europe, Israel, Dubai, Monte Carlo, U.S.A., and the U.K. King regular visits his productions when they are on tour and he keeps close control of his operations worldwide.

His first musical Spirit of the Dance has been running for more than 21 years in theatres across the globe since its debut in September 1996 at the Bristol Hippodrome. Spirit of the Dance soon became one of the world's biggest dance shows and, in the period 1998 to 2006, there were 14 different troupes simultaneously performing the show in 14 different countries. It has received nine global awards, including best choreography and best international production, and has been seen by 20 million people worldwide. It has broken box office records in countries around the globe . King is credited with bringing musicals to the masses and his business model has been described as unique.

His international production company, Spirit Productions, currently has up to 25 shows on global tour. He employs around 500 dancers, singers and technical crew and owns two theatres in which his companies play for most of the year at the Kings Castle Theatre in Branson, Missouri. In 2012, King secured a third theatre, the newly constructed Broadway Theatre in the New York-New York Hotel & Casino on the Las Vegas Strip. King's American operations are handled from his US headquarters, located in Myrtle Beach, South Carolina. King has several ongoing contracts to supply major casinos in the US and worldwide with entertainment. He is also one of the principal suppliers of entertainment to the Casino de Monte Carlo in Monaco . Kings shows regular tour China and the Asian territories, where he is one of the most successful theatre producers touring in these regions.

In 2011, he was the subject of a six episode television documentary about his work producing shows. Dancing King: Man in the Mirror was commissioned by Discovery Networks UK. In September 2011, the show was broadcast in the UK, and countries around the world including prime time ABC2 in Australia.

In 2012, King took part in the UK TV show Secret Millionaire, where he went back to his home town of Leeds looking for good causes to help. He was the victim of a carjacking while filming undercover that came close to costing him his life. His episode, in which he donated money to three community groups in Leeds, launched the 2012 series on Channel 4. and attracted a record breaking number of viewers.

In September 2012 he simultaneously opened two new shows on opposite sides of the world on the same day, opening in the US and China simultaneously. Since that time, King has domineered the market in Asia, Australia and Europe with his various theatrical productions.

== Early life ==
David King was born in the Alwoodley district of Leeds, the only son of Stanley and Trudie King. His parents were both musical hall performers, having met when his father worked as a music hall comedian and his mother was a dancer. From the age of seven, King was considered a classical prodigy on the piano and gave concerts in Leeds Town Hall. However, at 12 years old he turned his back on the rigours of classical training, preferring to set himself up in business, buying and selling whatever he could get his hands on. With his sisters Wendy and Linda, he grew up in a musical household, and every weekend family members would gather to perform a family concert .

King attended Roundhay School in Leeds until the age of 15 when he left without any formal qualifications to become a self-employed market trader. He sold ladies clothing on Leeds Market, and, later, moved into jewellery retail. He maintained an interest in music and wrote musical compositions, including the musical score for his hit show "Spirit of the Dance"

== Professional career ==
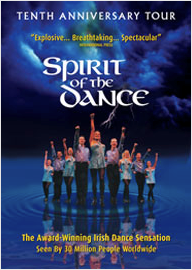
A poster for the show Spirit of the Dance

In the spring of 1996, King was struggling to forge a successful career in the entertainment industry when he went to see the Irish dance musical Riverdance at the Hammersmith Apollo theatre, London, starring Michael Flatley. Struck by the phenomenal success of the show, he decided to capitalise on demand for Irish dance and put together his own musical show, which he called Spirit of the Dance. Riverdance was not scheduled to go to provincial theatres around the UK or Europe at that time but the show had created a huge demand and Spirit of the Dance, which also incorporated tango, flamenco and salsa, would step in to meet the demand. Spirit of the Dance was to become a worldwide hit, and would launch King's career into the international theatre mogul he is today.

However, As an unknown, King could not secure financial backing and needed to raise substantial funds to launch Spirit of the Dance. . He sold all his possessions, including his car and family silver to raise the money to launch the show. . King singlehandedly wrote the plot and used musical score and songs he had written and boxed away in his younger years. He developed the entire show within three months and tickets for the first week at the Bristol Hippodrome sold out within four hours. He credits his working class background with giving him a good business head and the ability and determination to keep going when all the doors were closed to him. Despite the continual rejections, King refused to give in, and despite all the odds, went on to produce what became one of the world's most successful dance shows.

At the end of a four-month tour of UK theatres, Spirit of the Dance was declared the season's box office winner in Pollstar, an international trade magazine, and calls from around the world for the show began to flood in. King invested the money he had made to improve the show and take it to the US, Australia, Europe, the Far East and South Africa. Within two years, there were 14 companies of Spirit of the Dance appearing in 14 different countries at the same time and the show became one of the biggest dance shows in the world.

After five years of concentrating on Spirit of the Dance, King went on to broaden his portfolio of musical productions. There are currently 25 shows in King's portfolio, all of which he created, financed and produced himself. His shows include "Puttin on the Ritz", celebrating the music of Irvin Berlin, George Gershwin and Cole Porter, Man in the Mirror - The Michael Jackson Show which celebrates three decades of music from the King of Pop, Michael Jackson Le Grand Cirque, an acrobatics and stunt shown the style of Cirque du Soleil, drawing on the traditions of circus acts from Russia, China and Eastern Europe.

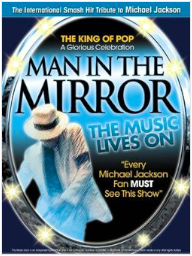
A poster for the show Man in the Mirror

King's Spirit of Christmas show was declared an unexpected box-office hit in China over the festive period from December 2011 to January 2012 and cast members found themselves mobbed by fans on the streets of Beijing. King's Christmas show has been developed since then, and now regularly tours America, under the title "Christmas Wonderland". For the first time, in 2016 a version of the show appeared at the Orb theatre in Tokyo, Japan as well as a specially created version that performed in the arena in Bucharest.

King's theatre in Branson Missouri, USA was wrecked by a tornado which ripped through the mid west of America leaving at least 12 people dead in March 2012. Reports said that one twister tornado narrowly missed the hotel where he was staying, but destroyed his theatre across the road, leaving him a £1million bill. The damaged theatre was rebuilt and re-opened in October 2012 under the new name of the King's Castle Theatre.

Country music legend Dolly Parton selected King's show Spirit of the Dance to headline at her US themepark Dollywood, in Pigeon Forge, Tennessee, for the 2012 summer season. Spirit of the Dance still appears round the world, some 21 years after its first performance.

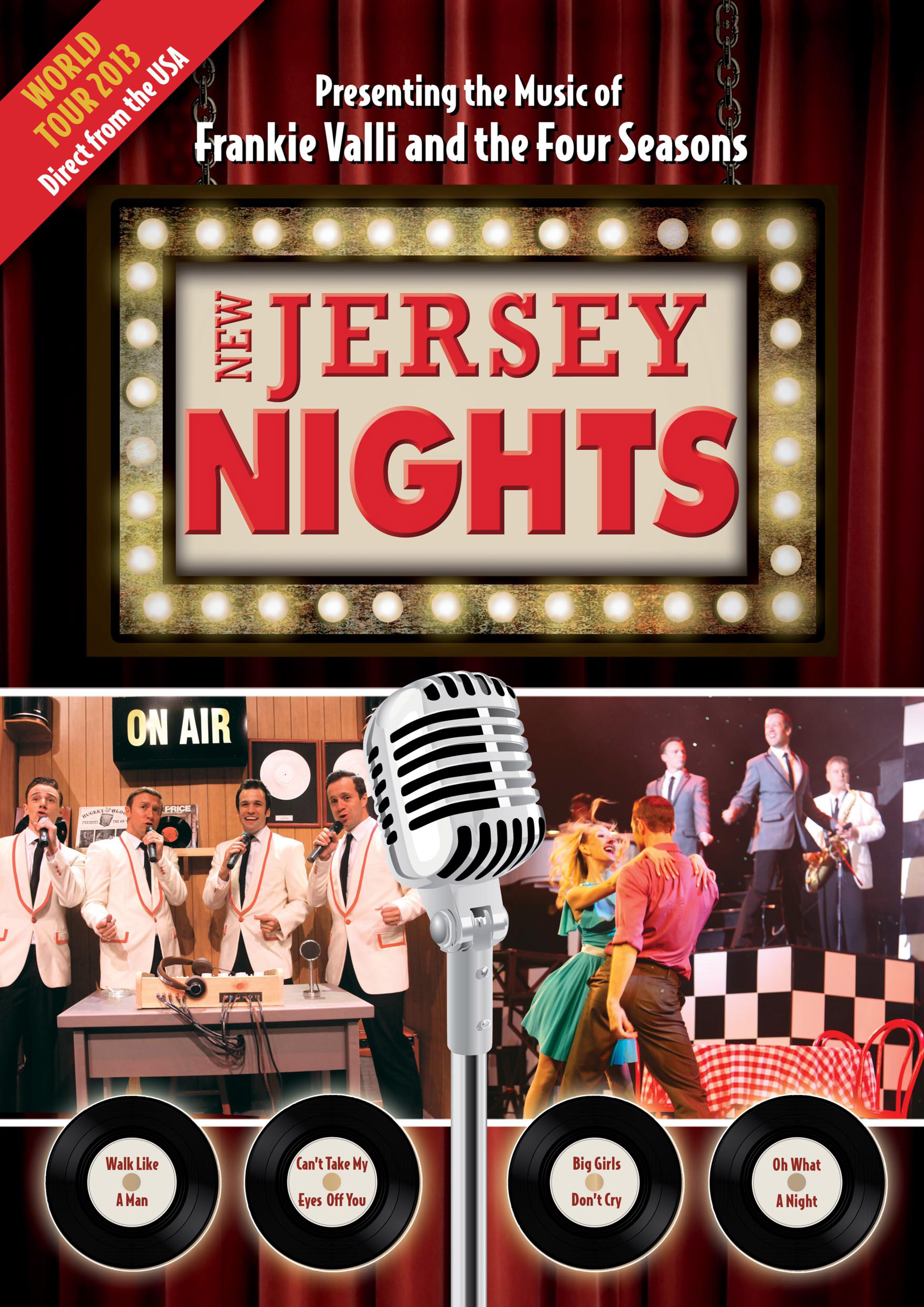
A poster for the Spirit Productions show New Jersey Nights, producer David King

A new show, an affectionate tribute to Frankie Valli and the Four Seasons called New Jersey Nights, opened to acclaim at the Milton Keynes Theatre in January 2013. It went on to embark on a 20-week national tour of the leading UK theatres, followed by tours of Europe and America. The show is also performed by two companies in the US at King's theatres.

King also operates an international management and agency company, Spirit Artists, which supplies music acts to corporate events and private clients. He has worked with major acts including Sir Elton John, Leona Lewis, Andrea Bocelli, Vanessa Mae, Liza Minnelli, Simply Red, Lily Allen, Duffy, Lionel Richie, Rod Stewart, Gloria Estefan and Jamie Cullum.

In October 2013 King became the first theatre producer to have three productions touring China at the same time. His show "Red Hot Broadway"toured the country between 12 September 2013 and 1 December 2013, including Beijing, Shanghai, and Qingdao. Another of his shows, "Dancing Queen", toured China between 29 October 2013 and 19 January 2014.

King opened his production of "Dancing Queen" at Planet Hollywood in Las Vegas, Nevada, United States, on 13 September 2013. Pop star Britney Spears also begin a residency at the same hotel at the end of 2013.

== Honours ==
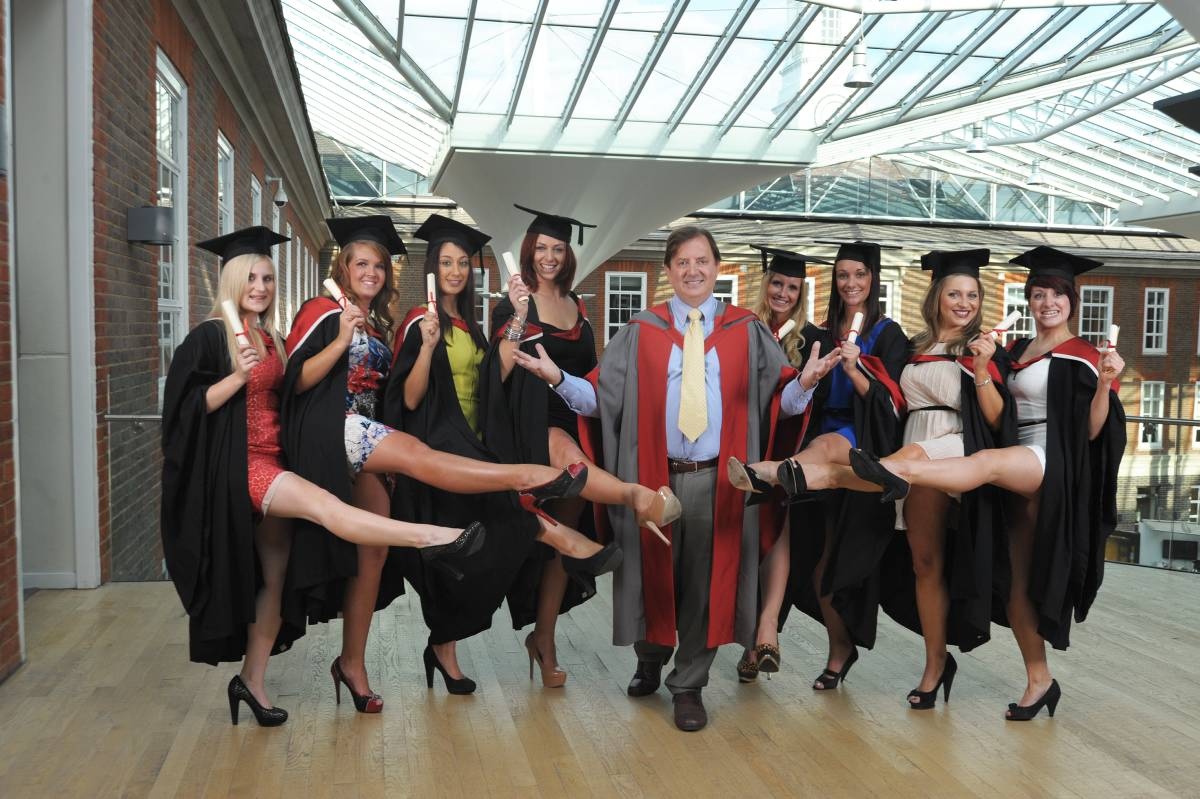
David King awarded an honorary doctorate

King was awarded an honorary doctorate for his major contribution to the performing arts industry by Middlesex University on 22 July 2011. The award was presented as part of the university's annual graduation celebrations and more than 300 performing arts students received their degree certificates during the same ceremony. King described the honorary doctorate as a great honour and encouraged students to be focused and determined in pursuing their careers. The Middlesex University vice chancellor, Michael Driscoll, presented King with his award and said King's skill and determination made him an example for graduates to follow.

== Spirit Shows productions ==
Spirit of the Dance

Irish dance combined with tango, flamenco and salsa. King's first show opened in September 1996 at the Bristol Hippodrome and is still running today in theatres across the world.

Man in the Mirror

A tribute to Michael Jackson, the King of Pop. Songs include Bad, Thriller, Beat It, Black or White and Earth Song. After premiering in May 2010 at Kings Palace Theatre in Myrtle Beach where the show was made, the production transferred to the UK where it opened in Leeds, King's hometown. It then moved to the Casino de Monte Carlo where it headlined their summer season. It now tours internationally. . Screen tributes come from singers Janet Jackson, Liza Minnelli, Justin Timberlake, Quincy Jones, and Whitney Houston.

Bohemian Rhapsody

A celebration of the greatest hits of Freddie Mercury and Queen, the world premiere of Bohemian Rhapsody was in June 2012 at The Theatre Royal, Newcastle. Classical recording artist Jonathan Ansell, an X Factor winner and former lead singer of G4, joins award-winning performers from London's West End and a live orchestra. The show includes Queen classic hits such as We Will Rock You, Killer Queen, We are the Champions, Barcelona and Bohemian Rhapsody.

Le Grand Cirque

An acrobatics and stunt show, Le Grand Cirque opened a UK tour at the Festival Theatre, Edinburgh, in March 2007. In 2008-2009 it twice broke box office records after opening at the Sydney Opera House, Australia. It has a cast of 39, featuring performers from China, Mongolia, Russia, Mexico, the United States, Great Britain and Australia. It has been referred to as a theatrical blend of eye-popping feats of human endeavour and a modern-day indoor circus.

Spice - the Show

King's burlesque show was a resident production at the cabaret theatre adjoining the Casino de Monte Carlo in Monaco and then it transferred to the Planet Hollywood Casino, in Las Vegas. It opened in December 2010 and King conducted auditions for the show in London in April 2011.

Debbie Reynolds - 'Alive and Fabulous'

King handled the UK tours of the late American film star Debbie Reynolds and in 2010 culminated in a season at the Shaftesbury Theatre in London's West End. The show was produced, directed and promoted by King.

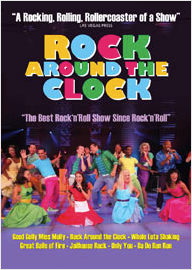
A poster for the show Rock around the Clock

Rock around the Clock

A parade of 1950s rock and roll classics including music made famous by Buddy Holly, Bill Haley, Chuck Berry and Elvis Presley. Touring since 2009, there are touring troupes of this show in the UK and US, and a resident version at King's Branson Variety Theatre in Branson, Missouri, USA.

Dancing Queen

A cast of 20 dancers and singers perform ABBA hits and party classics from the 1970s. It was first made in 2006 and has toured the UK several times, as well as having been performed in casinos in Atlantic City, Reno, and Niagara Falls, Canada.

Solid Gold Motown

A tour of the classics by Motown artists. Songs include Dancing in the Street, Reach Out I'll Be There and Stop in the Name of Love. The show was first conceived in 2005 and has toured ever since with a cast of 16 performers plus a live band.

The Twelve Irish Tenors

Irish classics, opera, pop and swing. Songs include Danny Boy, Cockles and Mussels, My Way and Hey Jude. The show has toured Europe and the US and a resident version is performed at the Branson Variety Theatre.

Twist and Shout

A musical journey through the 1960s which toured the UK in 2009 and 2010. The cast is made up of four singers and 10 dancers and songs include Twist and Shout and Can't Buy Me Love.

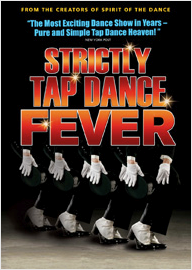
A poster for the show Strictly Tap Dance Fever

Strictly Tap Dance Fever

A celebration of tap dance, jive and swing. The show has been touring since 2009 and features tap dance routines made popular in the 1920s through to modern tap from the year 2000. The show includes tributes to Fred Astaire and Gene Kelly.

Red Hot Broadway

A tribute to Broadway productions including Phantom of the Opera, Cabaret, Chicago, Cats, 42nd Street, Hairspray, and Les Miserables. It was first made in 2002 and has toured the world, including venues in China, South Africa and Europe. A cast of four singers and 12 dancers recreate show tunes including 'One' from Chorus Line and All that Jazz from Chicago.

The Spirit of Christmas

This show has become very popular in the US and works in theatres and casinos during the holiday season. Up to 12 versions of the show can be touring at the same time during November and December. The show usually has a cast of 24 performers, and features songs White Christmas, Have Yourself a Merry Little Christmas, Silent Night and more.

I Can't Stop Loving You

A recreation of the music of Ray Charles. The show was first produced in 2007 at the Eldorado Casino in Reno, Nevada, USA. It transferred to London's West End, and played at the Theatre Royale, Haymarket. It then went on to tour the UK, Europe and the US. The show has an eight piece live band, eight dancers and six singers.

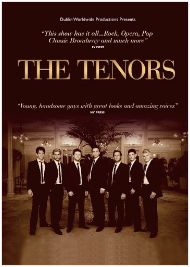
A poster for the show The Tenors

The Tenors

A corporate show modelled on the success of Il Divo. Seven of the 12 Irish Tenors perform at private functions.

Frank, Dean and Sammy

A tribute to the Rat Pack, featuring three American 'lookalikes' of Frank Sinatra, Dean Martin and Sammy Davis Jr. The three stars perform with three back-up female singers and an eight-piece swing band. The show has appeared in casinos in the US and has toured the UK and Europe since 2004. Songs include My Way and That's Amore.

Celebration

A 1970s and 1980s disco show. The anthem songs include "Footloose", "Night Fever", "Fame", "Car Wash", "Relax", "Eye of the Tiger", "What a Feeling" and "YMCA".

Erotiq de Paris

A late night casino production for adult audiences only. This show was the prototype for his new production 'Spice- the Show' that premiered in Monte Carlo.

Sin City Rocks

An adult-only rock party show.

== Personal life ==
After a 5-year relationship, King was married in June 2014 to Swansea born Priscilla Rees, who worked as a performer in his shows in Branson USA. He has five daughters from previous marriages, two of whom live in the Cayman Islands, and eight grandchildren. He has one son, Oscar, who was born in October 2017. King lives part of the year in Monaco and part of the year in the US when he is not touring with his many shows worldwide . He is a supporter of several charities.
