= David Jamilly =

English philanthropist

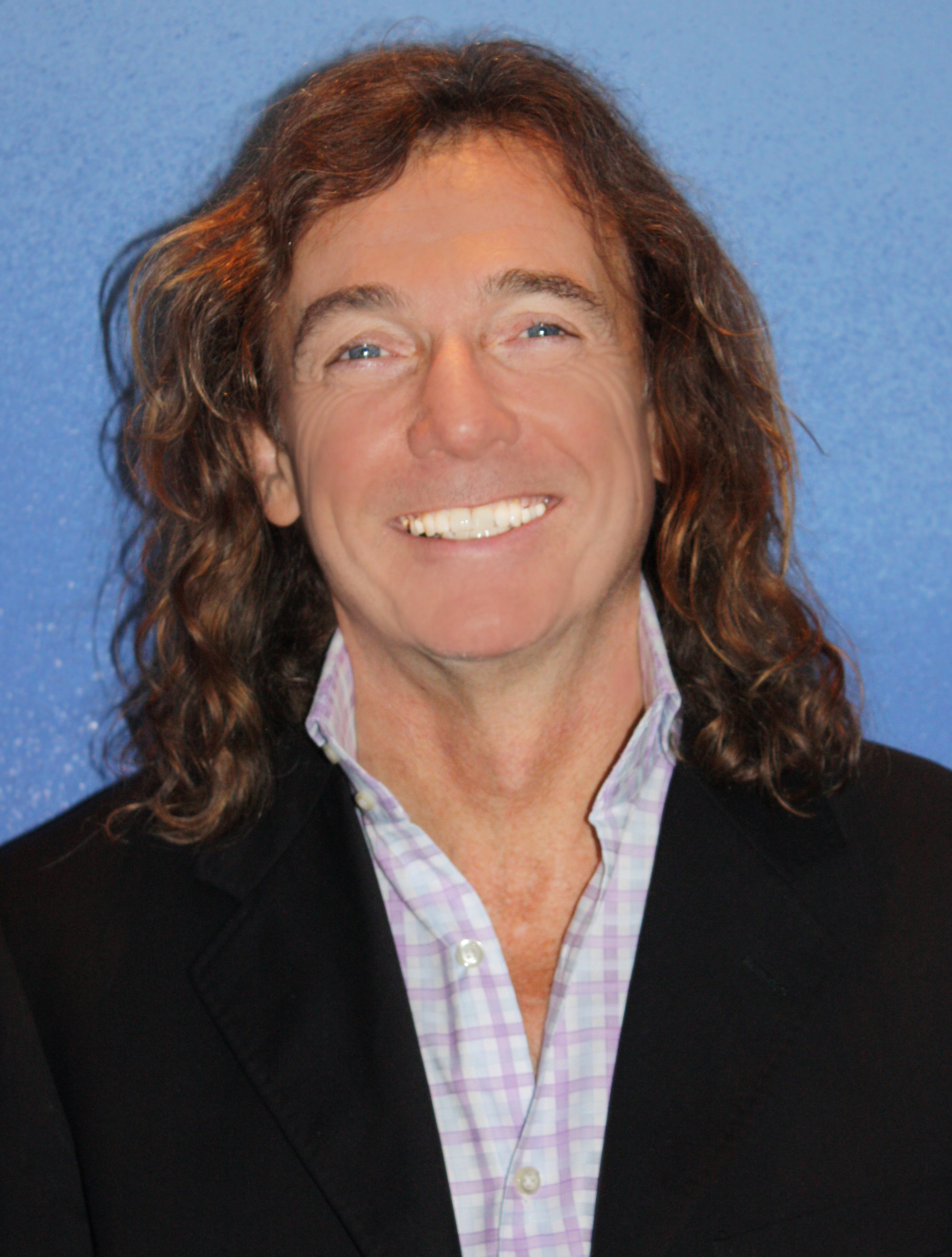
- Born: London, England
- Citizenship: British
- Education: Highgate School, London

David Jamilly is an English social entrepreneur and humanitarian.

== Business career ==
Jamilly co-founded Theme Traders with his sister Kim Einhorn. Theme Traders is a London based event management, party planning and prop hire company launched in 1989. The company grew out of their work as children's entertainers, when they began to receive requests from parents to organise entire parties.

== Humanitarian activities ==
Jamilly started his humanitarian activities with entertaining sick children at Great Ormond Street Hospital. In 1977 he founded Pod Children's Charity, which now arranges over 2500 performances a year and has entertained over a million children in children's hospital wards and hospices throughout the United Kingdom.

Jamilly appeared on the Secret Millionaire in 2010. In the programme, he handed out £25,000 each and became patron to Sid's Place - Redcar Community College, Zoe's Place Baby Hospice and the Redcar Amateur Boxing Association.

Jamilly, with Frankie Wales, was one of the co-founders of the Redcar Fire and Steel Festival a festival which celebrated Teesside's heritage of 150 years of steel making.

Jamilly founded The Good Deeds Organisation in 2005 which promotes global good deeds and kindness and went on to co-launch and celebrate Kindness Day UK in 2010. Kindness Day UK aims to make each person in the UK carry out one act of kindness on 13 November, World Kindness Day.

In 2011, Jamilly founded Kindness UK, a not-for-profit, independent organisation which aims to promote, share and unite kindness every day and make kindness a greater part of everyone's day-to-day lives. He is also a patron of Zoe's Place Baby Hospice, a charity for sick babies and young children.

== Educational activities ==
He sat on the advisory board for the International Centre for Research in Events, Tourism and Hospitality (ICRETH) 2011 - 2013 based at Leeds Metropolitan University. Jamilly was made an Honorary Doctor of Business by Southampton Solent University on 22 November 2013. Jamilly funded Kindness UK Symposium at the University of Sussex in 2016.

== Bibliography ==
- David Jamilly and Tammy Cohen, Party People: How to make millions from having fun (ISBN 978-1-907499-77-7)
- David Jamilly, Enjoy: The Creative Approach to Events - Theme Traders (ISBN 0-9542453-0-X)
