= Gavin Wheeldon =

British businessman (born 1976)

- Born: 12 May 1976 (age 49); Leicester
- Known for: Entrepreneur

Gavin Wheeldon (born 12 May 1976) is a British businessman and entrepreneur from the Manchester area who is best known for his appearances on the reality television shows Dragon's Den and The Secret Millionaire; and a controversial contract his former company, Applied Language Solutions (ALS), signed with the United Kingdom's Ministry of Justice. After selling it to Capita, he founded Purple WiFi, a company that provides free WiFi platforms to businesses for customer relationship management.

== Applied Language Solutions ==
Wheeldon founded ALS in 2003. In 2007, he appeared on Dragons' Den and offered 4% of the company in return for a £250,000 investment. None of the Dragons backed him, although he was offered half by Duncan Bannatyne.

=== Ministry of Justice Controversy ===
In 2011, the company signed a lucrative contract with the UK's Ministry of Justice to provide court interpreters across England and Wales. Registered police and court interpreters were unhappy about the ministry's decision to use ALS, in addition to the much lower pay offered by the company, and over 1,000 of them protested the decision. The majority of them initially refused to work for ALS, leading to questions in Parliament as to whether the contract was viable.

During the first quarter of the contract, ALS faced 2,232 complaints and proved capable of only fulfilling 65% of service requests. Some poorly-prepared interpreters were accused of creating 'courtroom chaos' that led to cases and proceedings being delayed or collapsing entirely because they failed to show up on time or were deemed incompetent. During a meeting with the Justice Select Committee in October 2012, Wheeldon claimed the allegedly intimidating behaviour of interpreters who raised concerns over low pay offered in the contract attempted to prevent other interpreters from working on it. He also admitted that his company relied on extrapolated figures during the planning process.

=== Sale to Capita ===
Wheeldon sold Applied Language Solutions to Capita plc in December 2011 for up to £67.5 million. He remained the CEO of the business for six months. The company was later rebranded Capita Translation and Interpreting.

== Other work ==
In 2009, Wheeldon appeared in an episode of The Secret Millionaire on Channel 4, where he visited North Wales and observed and subsequently invested in a number of community projects.

In January 2010, the Oldham Council set up the Business Leadership Group, of which Wheeldon is a member. The group is composed of 14 local business owners who advise the Oldham Council and local regeneration body Oldham Partnership on economic and other policy matters.

=== Purple ===
In May 2012, after leaving ALS, Wheeldon set up an internet business named So Purple Group Limited. Now also known as Purple, it was established through the acquisition and merger of five companies to provide a number of services for the retail and leisure industry. The company offers a free WiFi platform for businesses to monitor their customers' shopping patterns and habits, in addition to communicating with them with targeted messages via their social IDs.

In May 2013, Purple sold its broadband division for £800,000 to Coms to focus on WiFi. Until 2015, Purple was funded by Wheeldon before receiving its first outside funding of £5 million from Terry Leahy, Bill Currie, Iain MacDonald, Bob Willett, and Juno Capital.

== Awards ==
- Director of the Year at the 2007 Institute of Directors Awards.
- In April 2010, Gavin Wheeldon's business, Applied Language Solutions, was awarded The Queen's Award for Enterprise.
- In 2011, Wheeldon was the joint winner of the Young Entrepreneur of the Year Award at EN Magazine's northwest awards.
- Businessman of the Year at 2012 at The One Oldham Business Awards.

== Personal life ==
Wheeldon currently lives in Uppermill, Oldham with his wife and two daughters.
