= Ben Way =

British businessman

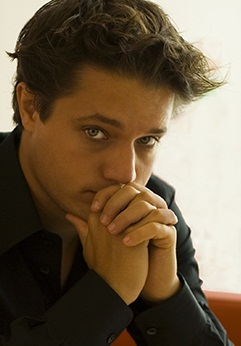
- Ben Way in 2008
- Born: Ben Way; 1980 (age 45–46); Exeter, Devon, England
- Occupation: Entrepreneur

Ben Way is a serial entrepreneur and author best known for his appearance on Secret Millionaire, The Startup Kids and as a cast member on Start-Ups: Silicon Valley.

== Early life ==
Way grew up in a village in Devon, where his parents divorced when he was young. He has a sister, Hermione Way, who is a journalist and appeared on a reality TV show with him; they were separated from each other at an early age. Way was diagnosed with dyslexia at a young age and despite being told by his teachers that he would never read or write, Way describes his Dyslexia as an advantage.

== Business history ==
Way started his first company 'Quad', a computer consultancy, at age 15. At the age of 19 he raised £25 million from Jersey-based venture capitalist to create an online shopping comparison technology called Pulsar. However, after a dispute with the investors in 2001 he was diluted out of the business and lost everything. It is reported that he was in the under thirties Sunday Times Rich List 2001 on the same day he could not buy a tube ticket.

He won "New Business Millennium Young Entrepreneur of the Year" in 2000 which was given to him by Gordon Brown. After receiving this award he went on to advise both the White House and the UK government on technology as well as joining the internet incubator NetB2B2 PLC as a non-executive. After this he headed up technical and environmental investments and due-diligence for the Rotch Property Group.

He currently runs The Rainmakers, an innovation and incubation company, through this he got involved with a number of start up companies, including the online mentoring company Horsesmouth, language learning company FriendsAbroad which was sold to Babbel. During this time he was also chief innovation officer for Brightstation Ventures a $100m technology VC fund started by Dan Wagner and Shaa Wasmund.

In 2012 he moved to San Francisco.

== Business ventures ==
Way is involved in a large number of startup companies that are listed on the Rainmakers Global website, such as GoDine, the restaurant booking service; FuelMyBlog, the blogging product review service; Truevoo, the iPhone apps store review service; an SME advice service called Smarta; and a graduate recruitment company called BraveNewTalent. In 2009 Rainmakers opened a United States (US) branch and consequently became involved in a number of US startups, including Traffic Spaces, the ad management platform, and BoostCTR, the Google adwords optimizer. He is also one of the founders of Alpha Concierge Matchmaking, which describes itself as the world's most exclusive matchmaking app.

Way was also involved in a number of green start-up companies, such as SellMyMobile and SellCell, and is a cofounder with Paul Williams of Freetricity, a renewable energy provider based in the UK and the US.

Way is the founder of Viapost, an online postal company. The POIP service allows printing of documents over the internet which are then sent by Royal Mail.

He is involved in his sister's production company Newspepper, a citizen journalism site that covers a large number of UK tech sector events.

In 2011 he worked with the founding team at TradeHill the first US crypto exchange on the BitCoin.com deal.

Way and his sister developed GoIgnite, a health and lifestyle smartphone app and hardware for the Bravo TV reality television show they both appeared in.

== Television, film, and media ==
In 1999 Way was featured on Britain's Richest Kids on ITV. After this he appeared on a number of television shows including Big Breakfast, partly due to some unusual restrictions on his personal life.

In 2006, he appeared on the Channel 4 TV show Secret Millionaire where he gave away £40,000 in a philanthropic act after spending two weeks in Hackney as a volunteer. £20,000 was given to a youth organisation, £10,000 to a young entrepreneur, and another £10,000 as a thank you to one key member of the Hackney community. He subsequently appeared in the follow-up program Secret Millionaire Changed My Life.

In 2008 has appeared on a Channel Four, 3 Minute Wonder on Robotics and as a "Web Guru" on Sky News.

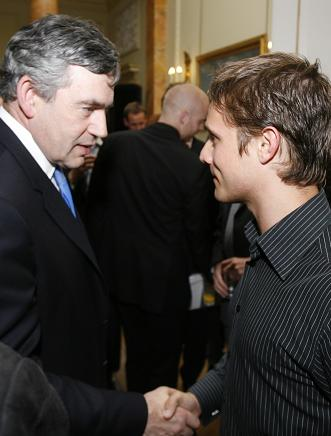
Ben Way meeting Gordon Brown in 2007.

He has written for a number of publications including The Telegraph, City AM and a chapter in How to be a Teenage Millionaire.

Ben appeared on ITV's Take Me Out dating show on 20 February 2010, on which he declared his personal wealth as £10m, also taking Daisy Gigg out on a date.

In 2012 he appeared as one of the main cast on Bravo's TV Show Start-Ups: Silicon Valley with his sister Hermione Way working on an mHealth innovation called Ignite and raising $500,000 for it from investors including Esther Dyson.

He was one of the Entrepreneurs featured in the highly successful documentary The Startup Kids about the startup culture in San Francisco and the USA.

In 2013 he wrote a book called Jobocalypse: The End of Human Jobs and How Robots will Replace Them'.

== Supported charities and organizations ==
He has been involved with a number of charitable organizations, most notably his support of the Pedro Club and a youth club from Hackney which he gave money to through The Secret Millionaire. He is also the patron of Social Firms an organization dedicated to getting employment for people with disabilities.

He has acted as a judge on behalf of a number of charities including Anne Frank Awards and Unlimited Awards as well as having been an advisor to the charities Edge and Nesta.

== Awards ==
- New Business Millennium Young Entrepreneur of the Year
- Young Gun 2007

== Politics ==
Way stood as a Liberal Democrat candidate in Bayswater Ward in the City of Westminster.

Way is an advocate for immigration reform after having his own immigration challenges while moving to the United States.

== Bibliography ==
- Way, Ben (9 September 2019). Carbon Awakening: Birth of the God Machine. Twentieth Century Press. ISBN 978-0578539300.
- Way, Ben (21 August 2018). 10 Skills for Effective Business Communication. Tycho Press. ISBN 978-1641520980.
- Way, Ben (21 June 2013). Jobocalypse. Createspace. ISBN 978-1482701968.
