= Pod Children's Charity =

British nonprofit organisation

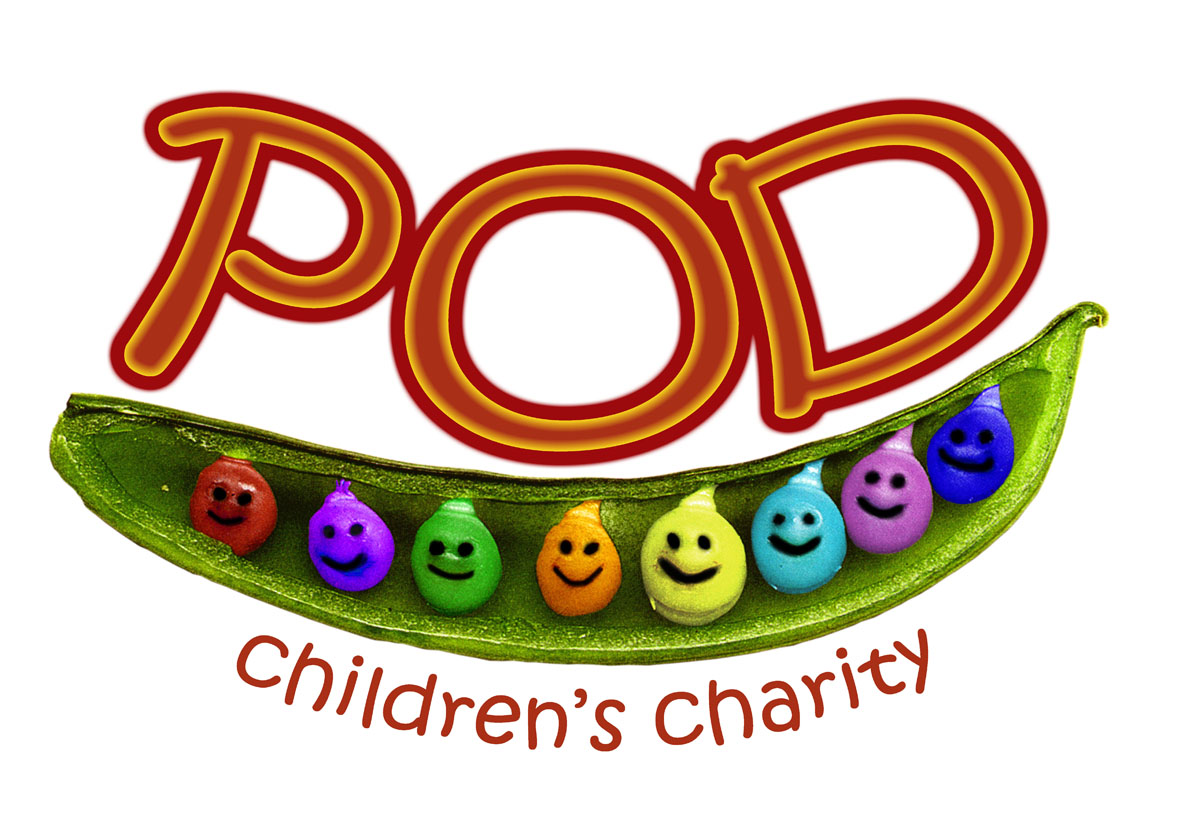
- POD Children's Charity Logo
- Founded: 1977
- Founder: David Jamilly
- Type: NGO
- Registration no.: Registered Charity No. 279743
- Region served: United Kingdom
- Leader: Margaret Munford MBE
- Website: podchildrenscharity.com/index.html

Pod Children's Charity (registered as Pod Charitable Trust no: 279743) is a British charitable organization, which provides live entertainment for children in hospitals and hospices throughout the UK.

== History and overview ==
Pod Children's Charity was founded in 1977 by David Jamilly, after he organized small parties with music and entertainment for children and noticed a positive effect which those have on them. Pod Charity started their shows at Great Ormond Street Hospital, one of the London's largest children's hospitals. At that time, hospitals were rarely child oriented and had restricted visiting times.

In 1981 Margaret Munford became administrator for Pod and was awarded an MBE in 2012 for services to Pod Children's Charity.

Pod employs professional children's entertainers, such as puppeteers, clowns and musicians, who perform in the playroom, on the ward or at the bedside. Pod organises over 2500 performances at over 150 hospitals and hospices across the UK.

== Aim ==
Pod aims to alleviate the trauma of hospital stay by sowing the seeds of fun, laughter and feeling better.

== The League of Friends of Pod Charitable Trust ==
The League of Friends of The POD Charitable Trust (Charity no: 296119) is an entirely separate organisation, which covers all of Pod Charitable Trust’s administrative costs. Any donations to Pod Children's Charity go directly to entertaining children in hospital.

== See also ==
- Play Therapy
