= Practice-based commissioning =

Practice-Based Commissioning (PBC) was a United Kingdom Department of Health initiative introduced in 2005 to improve primary care services by enabling healthcare professionals to decide how services are funded to meet the needs of the local population. PBC was designed to give healthcare staff, usually general medical practitioners (GPs), the resources and support to become directly involved in decisions on commissioning health services.

Policymakers wanted PBC to lead to high-quality services for patients in local and convenient settings. The incentive for GP involvement was that their practices could retain a proportion of any savings they made to invest in their own practices. In this respect, it was seen as a new Labour policy successor to the early 1990s Conservative policy of GP fundholding.

Lord Warner, former Labour Minister of State for Health, described the benefits of PBC as: "If there is an alternative that is better for the patient and better for the NHS, then practice-based commissioning provides the basis on which they can change the way that services are delivered."

The government intended GP practices to be supported by the PCTs (primary care trusts) to buy in ("commission") services for their patients based on cost and quality of care. This process was expected to generate financial savings of which 7/10ths may be retained by the practice for further investment while the remainder is passed back to the PCT.

Two years after the initiative was introduced, both doctors and primary care trusts were struggling to understand how to implement the scheme. By 2010, GP practices were forming coalitions known as consortia, in order to commission services at the necessary scale and efficiency. While this process was initially voluntary, eventually practices were ordered to become part of commissioning groups as part of the Health and Social Care Act 2012.
