= Andrew Feldman (poker player) =

English poker player (born 1987)

- Born: 16 July 1987 (age 39); Watford, England

World Series of Poker
- Bracelet: None
- Final table: None
- Money finish: 1

European Poker Tour
- Final table: 1
- Money finishes: 4

Andrew Feldman (born 16 July 1987, Watford) is an English poker player. He started playing poker on the Internet when he was 18 through his older brother and then received sponsorship from Full Tilt Poker.

== Poker ==
Feldman won his first televised 888 UK Poker Open tournament, winning $250,000 at the age of 19 in November 2007, beating Gideon Barnett heads-up with king–four off-suit against Barnett's ace–king, as a four came on the turn.

He was signed by Full Tilt Poker in April 2009.

In October 2008, Feldman and Robert Williamson III became the largest winners in the *Party Poker Poker Den: Big Game III* cash game, racking up a profit of $63,350 by winning an $80,000 pot against Finnish pro Juha Helppi.

Feldman has played high-stakes cash games in Melbourne, Las Vegas and Monte Carlo. In 2009 and 2010, Feldman participated in the Full Tilt Million Dollar Cash games that were held in London and Melbourne with a buy-in of $100,000. However, the following year, Ivey and Feldman clashed again in a pot where Ivey re-raised Feldman pre-flop with Queen-four off-suit and managed to make Feldman fold King high on the turn, which happened to be the best hand.

Feldman was scheduled to play High Stakes Poker season six in 2009, but he failed to make an appearance on the table due to last-minute replacements.

Feldman plays tournaments, and in May 2009, he final-tabled by coming 7th in an EPT €25,000 buy-in, receiving €79,000. A year later, in March 2010, Feldman came third in the €5,000 Heads-Up Tournament in Monte Carlo, losing to French player ElkY and collecting €30,000 in the process. A few months later, Feldman again came 3rd in the $25,000 highroller in Kyrenia, Cyprus, winning $124,400. The following month in London, Feldman played the £10,000 WSOPE Heads-Up High Roller and came third once more, losing to the eventual winner, Gus Hansen, where Feldman's pocket tens failed to beat Hansen's King-Jack. Feldman cashed for £96,212.

Feldman entered the $10,000 Aussie Millions Main Event in 2008 and 2010. In 2008 he finished 58th, cashing for $25,000, and two years later he won $50,000, finishing 24th. In January 2011, Feldman participated in the $100,000 High Roller alongside 37 other players—including Asian billionaires—creating a prize pool of $3.8 million. Feldman got knocked out to the eventual winner, Sam Trickett, who held pocket aces. A few days later, Feldman a $250,000 tournament with 19 other participants. Feldman finished in 7th place, where his pocket nines ran into David Benyamine's pocket kings. Erik Seidel went on to defeat Trickett heads-up, collecting a first prize of $2.5 million.

In October 2011, Feldman came fourth in Late Night Poker, cashing for $30,000. He was knocked out by Rob Okell. Feldman competed in the Party Poker Premier League Mixed Championships at the Playboy Club in Mayfair, London, competing in Texas Holdem and Pot Limit Omaha. Feldman finished second, winning $65,000 when he raised all-in against Andy Frankenberger heads-up with King-Queen against Frankenberger's King-Ten. A Queen came on the river to give Frakenberger a straight and win the title with a first prize of $100,000 and leaving a crying Feldman utterly distraught.

As of 2012, his accumulated poker tournament earnings total $1,029,358.

== The Secret Millionaire ==
On 24 June 2012, Feldman appeared on Channel 4's programme The Secret Millionaire.
