= Stanley Odd =

Alternative hip-hop group based in Scotland

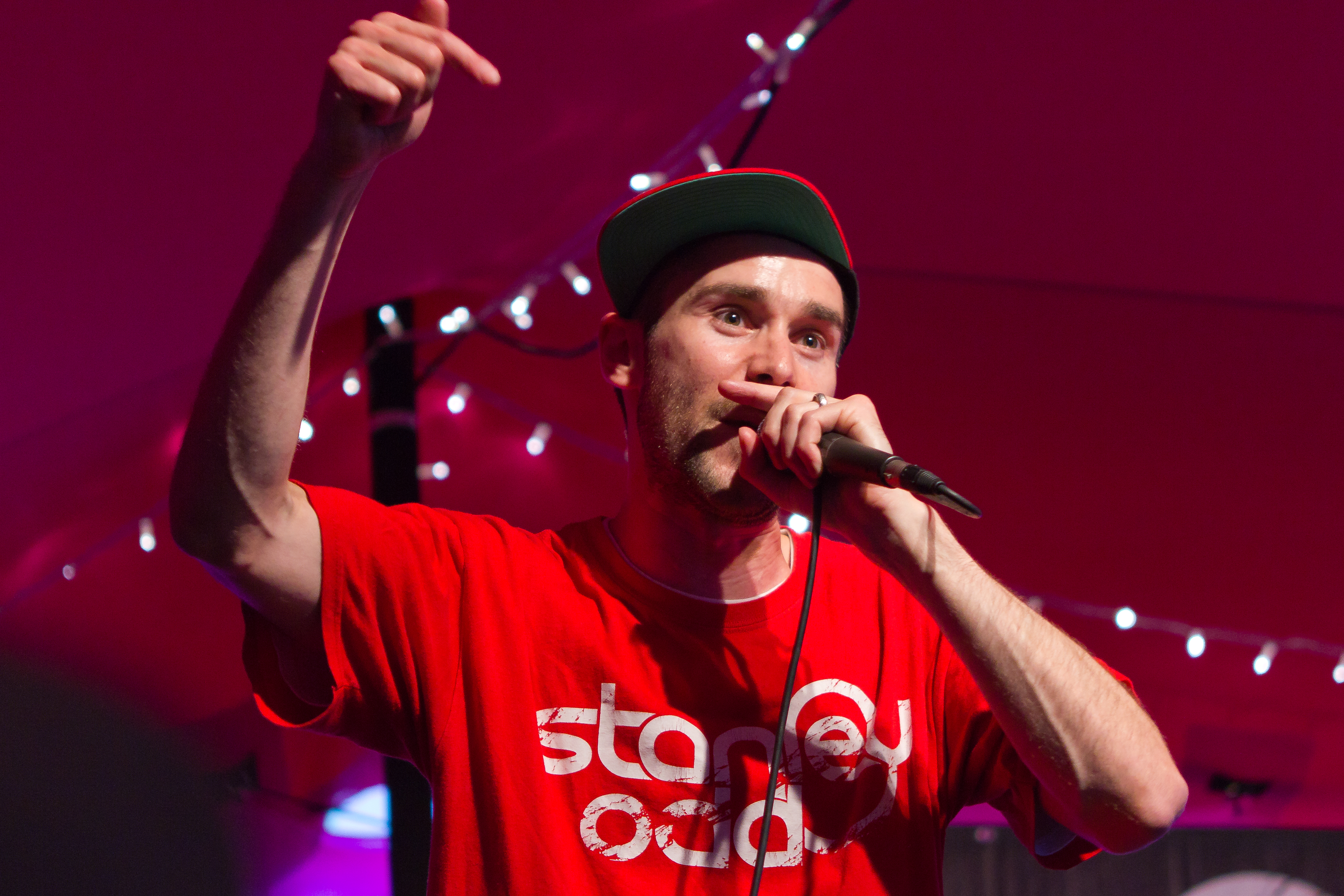
- Solareye of Stanley Odd performing at the Edinburgh Festival Fringe in August 2012

Background information
- Origin: Edinburgh, Scotland
- Genres: Hip hop; electronic; rap rock; political hip hop
- Years active: 2009-present
- Labels: Circular Records; Handsome Tramp Records; A Modern Way Records
- Members: Solareye; Veronika Electronika; AdMack; Scruff Lee; T Lo; Samson
- Website: stanleyodd.com

Stanley Odd is an alternative hip-hop group based in Scotland combining live instrumentation with samples and loops. Formed in 2009, the band have supported acts such as Arrested Development, Sage Francis and The View, and played at major Scottish festivals T in the Park and Edinburgh's Hogmanay Street Party. Their first album was released in May 2010 on Circular Records. Their self-released follow-up, Reject, was shortlisted for Scottish Album of the Year Award 2013, with their third A Thing Brand New coming in 2014.

== Career ==
The group's debut album, Oddio, was released in May 2010. It was met with favourable reviews, Scotland on Sunday stating "These Scottish hip-hop standard bearers sound much more relevant than the mighty Eminem, rapping stories that are social realism with a sense of humour and dance shoes".

The first EP of three released within 2011, Pure Antihero Material, was released in February. Building on the concepts of outsider-dom, awkwardness and social observation, the EP covers subjects from the UK coalition government to a games console addict who controls the other people living in his building. With continued local radio and podcast interest, in addition to support from national BBC Radio One Introducing and Amazing Radio stations, The Skinny Magazine observed "In a sane world, Stanley Odd would be way more popular than Snow Patrol".

The second of three 2011 EPs, The Day I Went Deaf, was released on Circular Records in late October; showcasing a darker, more direct sound that reflects their creative production methods involving writing and recording as a live band, re-sampling their own recordings and then sequencing and rebuilding the sampled material. An ongoing project, The Remix 11, is a series of tracks that Stanley Odd have had remixed by producers that the band themselves are fans of. New remixes were made available for free download on the group's Bandcamp page.

In their element live, Stanley Odd have been touring Scotland and the UK since 2010. Their 2011 performance at Insider Festival was described in The Scotsman as "dazzlingly eloquent... a performance that had the crowd baying delightedly for more". In 2012, the band continued their work ethic of extensive touring, playing summer festivals including, Knockengorroch, Belladrum, Wickerman and Greenbelt.

Released in September 2012, their second full-length album Reject revealed a further developed and more complete view of the band, both musically and lyrically. Covering topics from voter apathy and Scottish independence to issues of a more personal nature and social references, the album was ranked 4th in The Herald's Top 50 Albums of the Year, with group arts editor Alan Morrison observing: "The Edinburgh collective raises hip hop's game, speaking with the voice of a generation".

At the end of 2012, Stanley Odd won the Nordoff Robbins Tartan Clef Big Apple Award, ensuring that they would support The View at the Bowery Ballroom in New York City in April 2013. This grew into a mini-US tour, playing Central Park and The Webster Hall as well as venues in Brooklyn and Boston.

A new 12" EP titled Chase Yirsel, featuring a cover illustrated by Frightened Rabbit's Scott Hutchison, was released in April 2014 for Record Store Day. The group's third album, A Thing Brand New, was released in November 2014. Thereafter they had been relatively quiet in terms of releases but did perform sporadically, including headlining the Stowed Out festival in Scotland in 2016.

Solareye (Dave Hook) released his debut solo album, All These People Are Me, in 2018. He also features on the duet "Waves that Fall" from Carla J. Easton's 2020 album, Weirdo.

In January 2020, the band released a "comeback" single, the unmistakably political "Where They Lie", and performed several gigs, their first after a few years' hiatus. They then announced a full tour, with singles stacked up for release every six weeks throughout the second half of 2020 in the run-up to a new album, scheduled for February 2021. However, the tour was re-scheduled and later postponed indefinitely following the ongoing COVID-19 pandemic.

== Discography ==
=== Studio albums/EPs ===
Year	Album details	Peak positions
Year	Album details	UK
2010	Oddio: Release date: 17 May 2010; Label: Circular Records	
2011	Pure Antihero Material: Release date: 21 February 2011; Label: Circular Records	
2011	The Day I Went Deaf: Release date: 24 October 2011; Label: Circular Records	
2012	Reject: Release date: 21 September 2012; Label: Handsome Tramp Records	
2014	Chase Yirsel: Release date: 28 April 2014; Label: A Modern Way Records	
2014	A Thing Brand New: Release date: 10 November 2014; Label: A Modern Way Records	

=== Singles ===
Year	Single	Peak positions
Year	Single	UK
2009	"The Numbness": Release date: 14 October 2009	
2010	"Think of a Number": Release date: 23 August 2010	
2012	"Get Out Ma Headspace": Release date: 7 June 2012	
2012	"Killergram": Release date: 10 September 2012	
2013	"Carry Me Home": Release date: 21 January 2013	
2014	"Son I Voted Yes": Release date: 5 September 2014	
2020	"Where They Lie": Release date: 24 January 2020	
2020	"FUWSH": Release date: 3 July 2020	
2020	"Night Rip": Release date: 14 August 2020	
2020	"Killswitch": Release date: 25 September 2020	
