= The Secret Millionaire =

- Title card from series 10 (UK)
- Narrated by: John Lester
- Country of origin: United Kingdom
- Original language: English
- No. of series: 10 in UK; 3 in US; 2 in AU; 2 in IE
- No. of episodes: 67 in UK; 25 in US; 10 in AU (+ 2 unaired); 8 in IE (list of episodes)

Production
- Running time: approx. 48 min. (per episode)
- Production company: RDF Television

Original release
- Network: Channel 4 (UK); Fox/ABC (US); Nine Network (Australia); RTÉ1 (Ireland)
- Release: 29 November 2006 – 24 June 2012

The Secret Millionaire is a reality television show which originated in the UK, in which millionaires go incognito into impoverished communities and agree to give away tens of thousands of pounds (or tens of thousands of dollars in the American and Australian versions). Members of the community are told the cameras are present to film a documentary. The British version is produced by production company RDF Media. It first aired in 2006 on Channel 4, with further series in subsequent years.

== Format ==
In each episode, a millionaire leaves their luxurious life behind, takes on a secret identity and lives undercover in a much much poorer area of the country for a week to ten days (in the American version, it is 6 days). Living on a limited budget (Usually less than $150) with no modern conveniences they must forge their own way in the community – working and volunteering alongside the locals and finding individuals or projects who they think deserve a cut of their fortune. On their final day, the millionaires come clean and reveal their true identity to the people they have chosen, surprising them with gifts of thousands of pounds or US dollars to improve their lives. They must donate at least $100,000 in total. William Du was the first millionaire to donate off camera in which was not aired.

== British version ==
The first millionaire to appear in the series was 26-year-old Ben Way. A third series of the show began on Channel 4 on 5 August 2008. The first episode of Series 3 featured businessman James Benamor, who has been criticised in the media for investing in the sub-prime market, and sharp practice in his company the Richmond Group.

Andrew Feldman was the youngest millionaire to appear on the show at the age of 24 in the final episode of series 10 shown on 24 June 2012 and made the second largest donation a single charity had received, of £100,000, to Little Heroes; a charity that supports children with cancer.

== American version ==
An American version of the show premiered on 3 December 2008 on Fox.

Like the British version, the Fox show features wealthy benefactors each week who go undercover in the most deprived neighbourhoods of the United States. For one week, the millionaires mingle within the community and live on a very tight budget; this being the very first time doing so for many of them. At the end of the show, the millionaires reveal their identities and proceed to donate a minimum of $100,000 (which they sometimes divide among the recipients).

Fox has aired six episodes of the hour-long series, including a two-hour premiere. The millionaires have included Internet advertising tycoon Gurbaksh Chahal; Todd and Gwen Graves, of the restaurant chain Raising Cane's Chicken Fingers; Century Software founder Gregory Haerr; DUB Magazine founders Myles and Cynthia Kovacs; attorney, broker and sportswear entrepreneur Gregory Ruzicka, and his son Cole; and Baltimore, Maryland civic leader and Baltimore Ravens NFL cheerleader Molly Shattuck.

Season one aired on FOX. Season two consists of six hour-long episodes broadcast on ABC.

== Australian version ==
The first season of the Australian series (listed in local TV guides as The Secret Millionaire Australia, to prevent confusion with the US version which had been broadcast earlier that year) aired in 2009 on the Nine Network. It consisted of five episodes, and was narrated by Russell Crowe; in a Herald Sun interview, Crowe discussed his work on the show and his personal approach to charity. Millionaires featured in the series included Albert Bertini (of failed property development firm Trivest), Derek Leddie (founder of market research firm The Leading Edge), Peter Bond (managing director of Linc Energy), Naomi Simson (founder of RedBalloon), and Danny Wallis (founder of DWS Advanced Business Solutions). A completed sixth episode was withdrawn from the broadcast schedule due to financial issues faced by the featured benefactor. More than $750,000 was given away in grants to individuals and community groups.

Season 2 first aired on Nine on Monday 23 August 2010, also narrated by Russell Crowe. Millionaires featured in the second series include Carly Crutchfield (founder/CEO of CCorp), Karl Redenbach (founder of nSynergy), Sean Ashby (founder of aussieBum), Alf & Nadia Taylor (founders/directors of TNA Solutions), Christian Beck (founder/CEO of LEAP Legal Software), and Denis McFadden (founder/CEO of Just Cuts). Episode 1 benefactor, Sydney property developer Carly Crutchfield, was the focus of a Sydney Morning Herald article discussing the return of the series. Episode 3 benefactor, Sean Ashby, was featured in an article in The Daily Telegraph regarding his involvement in the show.

=== Season 1: 2009 ===
| Episode | Original airdate | Millionaire |
|---|---|---|
| Episode 1 | 7 October 2009 | Albert Bertini |
| Episode 2 | 14 October 2009 | Peter Bond |
| Episode 3 | 21 October 2009 | Derek Leddie |
| Episode 4 | 28 October 2009 | Naomi Simson |
| Episode 5 | 5 November 2009 | Danny Wallis |
| Episode 6 | Unaired | Leanne Wesche |

=== Season 2: 2010 ===
| Episode | Original airdate | Millionaire | Donation |
|---|---|---|---|
| Episode 1 | 23 August 2010 | Carly Crutchfield | $120,000 |
| Episode 2 | 30 August 2010 | Karl Redenbach | $106,000 + job offer |
| Episode 3 | 6 September 2010 | Sean Ashby | $195,000 |
| Episode 4 | 13 September 2010 | Alf & Nadia Taylor | $250,000 |
| Episode 5 | 20 September 2010 | Christian Beck | $107,000 + car |
| Episode 6 | Unaired, via FixPlay | Denis McFadden | $110,000 |

== Irish version ==
Annual series are produced by RTÉ since 2011 and are shown on RTÉ1 in September and October. During the year, repeats of the series have been shown on Channel 4 as Secret Millionaire Ireland.

=== Series 1: 2011 ===
| Episode | Original airdate | Millionaire | Location | Donation |
|---|---|---|---|---|
| Episode 1 | 19 September 2011 | John Concannon | Dublin, County Dublin | €40,000 |
| Episode 2 | 26 September 2011 | John Fitzpatrick | Dundalk, County Louth | €37,000 |
| Episode 3 | 3 October 2011 | Nadim Sadek | Shandon, County Cork | €40,000 |

=== Series 2: 2012 ===
| Episode | Original airdate | Millionaire | Location | Donation |
|---|---|---|---|---|
| Episode 1 | 10 September 2012 | Jim Breen | Finglas, County Dublin | €42,000 + An Allotment |
| Episode 2 | 17 September 2012 | Ramona Nicholas | Galway, County Galway | €41,000 |
| Episode 3 | 24 September 2012 | Richard Mulcahy | Ballinacurra Weston, County Limerick | €10,000 + €5,000 + New Mini-Bus |
| Episode 4 | 1 October 2012 | Vincent Cleary | Waterford, County Waterford | €15,000 + €3,000 + €15,000 + €7,000 |
| Secret Millionaire Revisited | 8 October 2012 | Series 1 millionaires | N/A | |

== Awards ==
The British version of Secret Millionaire won the Rose d'Or Award in 2007 for best reality series.

Secret Millionaire won the award for the best "Docu Soap" at the National Reality TV Awards for series 10 in August 2012.

== See also ==
- The Millionaire, a fictional 1955–1960 TV series about a millionaire who gives away money.
