= Xperience Days =

Experiental gift company

- Company type: Privately held company
- Founded: 2004
- Headquarters: Steamboat Springs, Colorado, United States of America
- Key people: Michelle Geib (President)
- Number of employees: 15
- Website: www.xperiencedays.com

Xperience Days is an experiential gifts company and was founded in New Jersey in 2004 by Michelle Geib, Gavin Bishop and Robb Young. The business is modelled after the experience gift companies first launched in the UK and pioneered by Acorne. The concept was popularised by Red Letter Days, in particular by the appearance of founder Rachel Elnaugh on the BBC series Dragons' Den.

In 2011, the company acquired the UK experience company, Extreme Element, encompassing Experience Days Ltd now based in Brighton. The US company relocated to Steamboat Springs, Colorado in 2012.

== Awards and recognition ==
In 2008, Xperience Days was listed on the Inc. 5000 fastest growing businesses.

== See also ==
- Experiential gifts
