= RedBalloon =

Australian online retail company

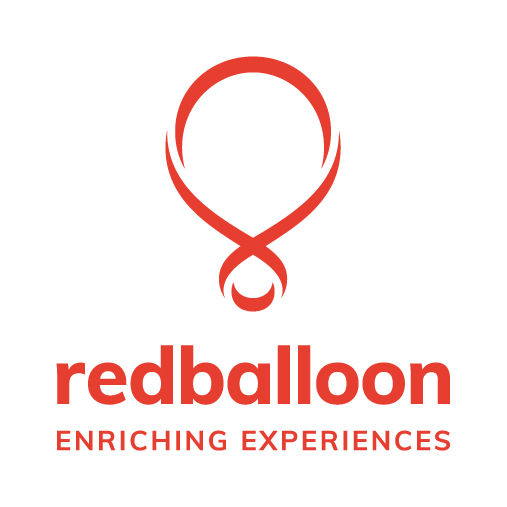
- Founded: 2001
- Founder: Naomi Simson
- Headquarters: Sydney, Australia
- Key people: David Anderson, CEO
- Parent: Big Red Group
- Website: RedBalloon website

RedBalloon is an Australian experiential gifts marketplace, offering varied gift experiences in Australia & New Zealand. The company was founded by Naomi Simson, currently based in Sydney, and owned by parent company Big Red Group. Its services include experiences such as cooking classes, spa days, scenic flights and overnight getaways.

== History ==
RedBalloon was founded in 2001 by Naomi Simson. Simson began the company out of her house with a $25,000 personal investment, after copying the idea from the UK business Red Letter Days She grew the company to forty six employees by 2011. The business concept was to sell experiences and memories rather than gifts. Simson launched the company from her home in Balmain, New South Wales. It was at the end of the dot-com era and she had a difficult time signing up businesses to list with the company. It was a total of two months and four days before the company sold its first experience gift, which resulted in a profit of $9 for commission on the sale.

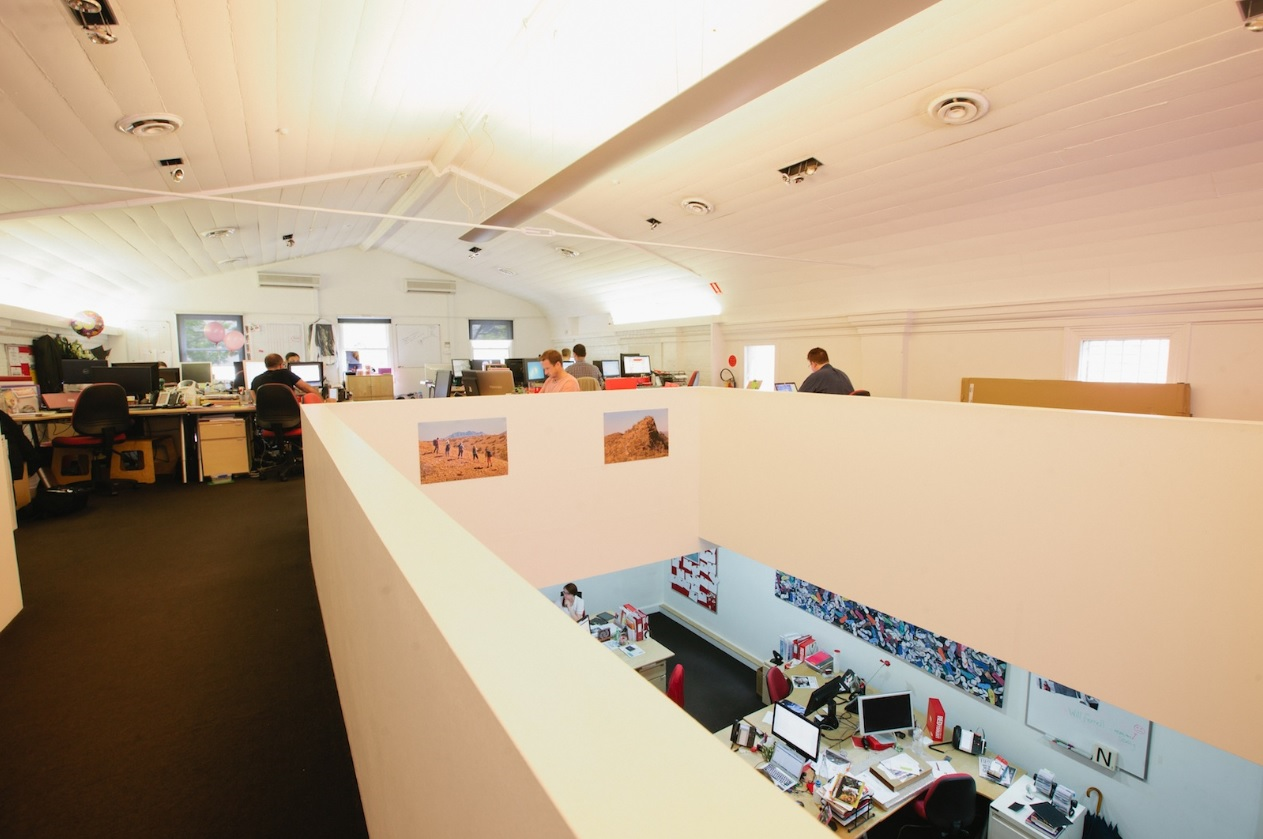
Previous RedBalloon office, Pyrmont NSW

The company began to grow six months after pop when it was contacted by Fuji Xerox about using the experiences available on the website as an incentive for its sales force. Companies such as Telstra, Westpac, Commonwealth Bank, and Qantas signed up shortly thereafter. The success of using the experiences for incentives led the company to create RedBalloon Corporate in 2004. From 2001 through 2012, it was reported that the company sold more than 1.7 million gift experiences. The company also reported a 40% growth in their 2012 financial year for overall transaction values. The company also sells experience gift cards in offline retailers such as Target, Big W, and Myer.

Naomi Simson was CEO of the company until 2011 when she took a step back from the operational side of the business. In October 2013 RedBalloon delivered its two millionth experience. By 2015, the company had delivered more than four million customers to businesses across Australia and New Zealand.

In 2015, Nick Baker was hired as CEO of the company and Ken Boundy became chairman of the board. RedBalloon went through a re-branding in late 2015, updating the company logo and website. David Anderson took over as CEO in 2017 after becoming the CEO of the newly formed Big Red Group, a holding company that became the parent of RedBalloon. Anderson purchased 50% of Redballoon in 2017.

RedBalloon was fined $43,000 in 2017 by the Australian Competition & Consumer Commission after an investigation found they charged four consumers excessive payment surcharges.

In response to the COVID-19 pandemic and lockdown restrictions, RedBalloon introduced 250 new experiences that could be enjoyed at home in 2020. This allowed Australians to experience special moments and celebrations without leaving their homes.

In 2025, the company established their ‘Best of RedBalloon Guaranteed’ program to help customers confidently find the perfect gift. Each experience given the badge had been tried and tested by a RedBalloon staff member. Any experiences awarded the title had to meet a strict criterion.

== RedBalloon New Zealand ==
RedBalloon expanded their operations to New Zealand two years after the Australian business was founded, launching redballoon.com.nz in December 2003. In 2016, a new website was relaunched with plans to double their business. They went from 207 product listings in New Zealand in 2016 to 732 listings in 2026.

== Awards and recognition ==
RedBalloon's awards and recognition include being named one of The Great Places to Work by Business Review Weekly from 2009 to 2013 and receiving recognition on the BRW Fast 100 list from 2004 to 2009. The company has also been a regular on the Deloitte Fast 50 for Australia, beginning in 2006. In 2015 it became the first Australian company to be named on the WorldBlu list of Most Freedom-Centered Workplaces.

In 2025, the Blackhawk Network ran its annual NAPCO research. Out of 50 leading Australian retailers, RedBalloon was ranked in the top five for its outstanding digital gift card program. It scored 90% overall for a friendly mobile wallet recipient experience.

RedBalloon is regularly featured in popular holiday gift guides for their broad range of experiences. The RedBalloon gift voucher has been listed in Vogue Australia and New Idea as one of best Mother’s Day gift options. Dining out experiences and gift vouchers have also been featured in The Daily Telegraph and other media listicles as some of the best Father’s Day gifts for dads.

In addition to gifting, RedBalloon is often mentioned in guides for things to do or for weekend escapes.

== See also ==
- Experiential gifts
