= Rachel Elnaugh-Love =

Former British entrepreneur (born 1964)

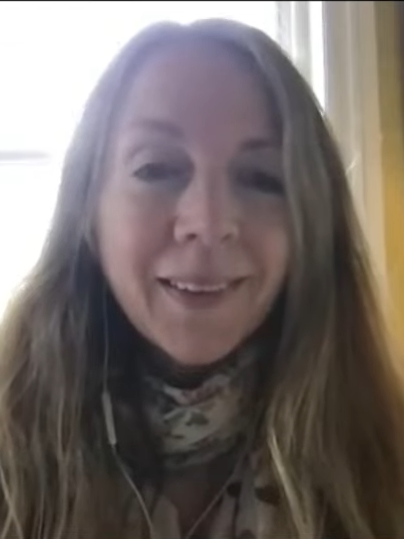
- Elnaugh-Love in 2023
- Born: 1964 (age 61–62); Essex, England
- Education: Chelmsford County High School for Girls
- Known for: Red Letter Days, Dragons' Den, Anti-vaccine activism
- Children: 5
- Website: https://rachelelnaugh.com

Rachel Elnaugh-Love (born 1964) is a former British entrepreneur who founded the UK gift company Red Letter Days. She was one of the investors participating in the first two series of BBC Two's reality TV show Dragons' Den.

== Early life ==
Elnaugh was born in Essex in 1964. When she was young she lived above her father's electrical shop, 'Elnaugh and Son' in Chelmsford. Rachel attended Chelmsford County High School for Girls, a grammar school in Essex. She originally wanted to take art history, but she was rejected by five universities. Before she founded her own company, she worked for the accountancy firm Arthur Andersen.

== Career ==
=== Red Letter Days ===
In 1989, Elnaugh founded Red Letter Days, one of the first UK companies to sell experiential gifts, such as motor racing days, hot air ballooning and health spa days. She could not get a bank loan at the time, so friends and family contributed £7,000 to the budget.

The company grew to an £18 million annual turnover and led to Elnaugh being a 2001/2 finalist in the Veuve Clicquot Businesswoman of the Year and Ernst & Young Entrepreneur of the Year.

In 2005, the company went into administration, and the remaining assets and inventory were bought by her fellow Dragons' Den entrepreneurs Theo Paphitis and Peter Jones. ITV1's Tonight programme criticised the business model of Red Letter Days, which included unpaid suppliers and disappointed purchasers. The programme suggested that the company failed to escrow or earmark supplier payment equity, using it instead as working capital. However, Elnaugh blamed Red Letter Days' bankers, and stated that the decision to go into administration was made to minimise job losses at the company.

=== Dragons' Den ===
In the mid 2000s, Elnaugh joined the BBC's reality series Dragons' Den. She was one of the five investors ("Dragons") in the first two series of the show, being the only female dragon at that time. During her tenure on the show, she made five agreed investment offers–in Grails, Le Beanock, Snowbone, Elizabeth Galton and Bedlam Puzzles. After Red Letter Days went into administration, between the filming and release of the second series, her "position became untenable" according to Elnaugh, and she and fellow departing Dragon Doug Richard were replaced in the third series by Richard Farleigh and Deborah Meaden.

=== After Dragon's Den and Red Letter Days ===
In 2005, she was head of a company called Easyart. The following year, she produced a double CD pack consisting of "positive business thinking", The Life Changers, with hypnotherapist Glenn Harrold. In her book Business Nightmares - When Entrepreneurs Hit Crisis Point (2008), she wrote of her Red Letter Days experiences. The Evening Herald's reviewer said "A novel and more original approach to the jaded "how to get ahead in business" manuals, even for the casual browser, Business Nightmares makes for a surprisingly entertaining and accessible read." Elnaugh founded the digital publishing and marketing platform Source TV in 2013. Her book Prosperity was published in 2016. She described it as "a summary of Rachel's key teachings around money, flow and abundance drawn from her years as a business mentor".

== Activism ==
During the COVID-19 pandemic, she aired her views on the vaccination programme, calling COVID vaccinations of those aged 12–15 years "child abuse". She was criticised when she called for Chris Whitty, Chief Medical Adviser to the UK Government, to hang.

Elnaugh was subsequently part of a group called 'Phoenix Rose' which bought 72 acres of land in Cressbrook Dale, Derbyshire, in an attempt to create a "safe haven away from the threat that humanity [is] facing". The scheme, that has been described as an 'anti-vax outpost', proved controversial with locals. The group was served with an enforcement notice in August 2023, but took no action, causing the Peak District National Park Authority to forcibly remove the structures at the site, in December of that year.

In May 2023, Elnaugh stood for a seat on the Derbyshire Dales District Council, under a party that she co-founded earlier that year called the LOVE Party. However, the party is not registered with the Electoral Commission, so she appeared on the ballot as an independent. She came in sixth place with 175 votes, being beaten by Conservative Party candidates Mark Wakeman and Gareth Bryn Gee. In February 2024 she stood in a local council by-election and placed last with 36 votes, the seat was won by Labour candidate Bob Butcher.

In February 2024, she announced her intention to stand in that year's East Midlands mayoral election, under the name Rachel Elnaugh-Love. However, after the deadline for candidates to be officially registered, on the 6 April, had passed, her name did not appear on the final list. She again stood under that name in the 2024 general election for the Derbyshire Dales constituency. She said her focus locally would be on promoting farming, tourism, affordable housing and reopening railways; and nationally on opposing "big corporations" and "involvement with overseas wars." She came sixth with 369 votes.

== Personal life ==
As of 2023, she has five sons and has been married twice.

== Books ==
- Elnaugh, Rachel (2008). Business Nightmares: The Unseen Moments When Successful Business Personalities Hit Crisis Point and How They Faced the Dawn. Crimson. ISBN 978-1-85458-409-0.
- Elnaugh, Rachel (2016). Prosperity. Source Publishing.
