= Peter Jones (entrepreneur) =

English businessman and television personality (born 1966)

Peter Jones CBE
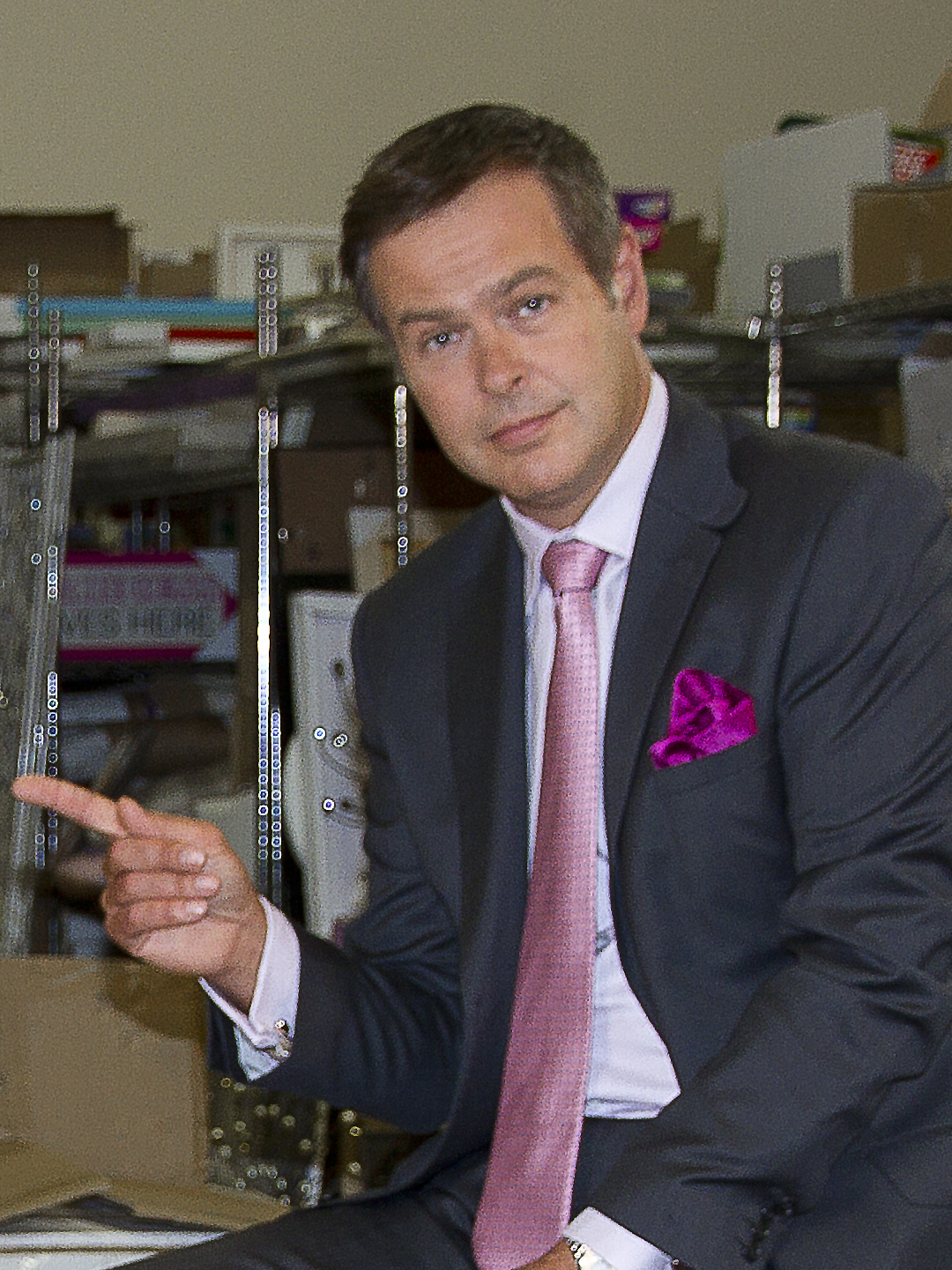
- Peter Jones in 2012
- Born: 18 March 1966 (age 60); Langley, Buckinghamshire, England
- Occupations: Entrepreneur; television personality
- Known for: Dragons' Den; American Inventor; Tycoon; Shark Tank
- Partner: Tara Capp
- Children: 5
- Website: www.peterjones.com

Peter David Jones CBE (born 18 March 1966) is an English entrepreneur, businessman, investor, and reality television personality, with interests in mobile phones, television, media, leisure, retail, publishing and property. He is the last remaining original investor on the BBC One series Dragons' Den, and has appeared on other television programmes with similar formats including Shark Tank and American Inventor in the United States.

== Early life ==
Jones lived in Langley (at that time in Buckinghamshire), before moving to Maidenhead in Berkshire when he was seven. He attended Desborough School and then The Windsor Boys' School.

== Business career ==
Jones set up a business in which he made personal computers under his own brand when he was 16 years old. However, he lost £200,000 after deciding to sell it to IBM. In an interview with The Times, Jones said his computer business failed in his twenties; he lost his four-bedroom home in Bray and his cars, and had to move back in with his parents. He then joined Siemens Nixdorf, where he eventually ran the UK arm of the computer division.

In his mid-twenties, he opened a cocktail bar in Windsor inspired by the Tom Cruise film Cocktail.

After Siemens' acquisition, he set up his next venture, Phones International Group, in April 1998.

Jones founded several businesses between 1998 and 2007, including 10telecom which he later sold to Vodafone; Data Select, which became a distributor of mobile phones and was acquired by Westcoast Group; Wines4Business.com, an online retailer specialising in the sale of wine and champagne to corporate clients; and Celsius Resourcing, a recruitment business specialising in biotechnologists. In the summer of 2005, Jones, together with Theo Paphitis, a fellow panellist on Dragons' Den, bought gift experience company Red Letter Days from another panellist Rachel Elnaugh, under whose ownership it had collapsed.

In 2005, he founded The Peter Jones Foundation, a charity to support the advancement of education in young people, particularly through teachings of enterprise and entrepreneurship. He opened the doors to the Peter Jones Enterprise Academy after developing Britain's first BTEC qualification in Enterprise and Entrepreneurship.

In 2009, Jones founded the Peter Jones Enterprise Academy (PJEA, formerly NEA) to teach entrepreneurial capabilities within the UK. PJEA has several campuses including Amersham, Sheffield, Manchester, Southend and Oxford. In November 2013, it was reported that a new Peter Jones Enterprise Academy was to be opened in Leamington through Warwickshire College. Pupils were taught how to enhance a company or key skills for becoming a successful entrepreneur. The academy was to offer the BTEC Level 3 Enterprise and Entrepreneurship at both its Leamington and Rugby campuses.

According to his website, some of his investments in businesses which appeared on Dragons' Den include luxury lifestyle and culture Wonderland magazine; Square Mile International, which provides data services for marinas and was later sold to BT; contemporary circus company The Generating Company; Synthetic Genomics; iTeddy; and Reggae Reggae Sauce.

He founded the TV production company Hungry Bear Media, which he left in 2021; and continues to own another TV production company, Peter Jones TV. He has several property investments including commercial offices, a Portuguese villa which he bought from DJ Chris Evans and a property in Beverly Hills, California, as well as properties in Barbados and Switzerland.

Jones sold part of Phones International Group, Wireless Logic, for £38 million in 2011, retaining the Data Select part.

In 2013, Jones became the main investor and owner of photographic retailer Jessops. His investment company owns Partner Retail Services, which operates Samsung Experience stores in the UK and provides electronics retail services to Jessops and other retailers.

In August 2017, it was reported that Jones and his Dragon's Den and Red Letter Days partner Theo Paphitis were almost scammed by an accountant who forged cheques over a two-month period.

== Television and media ==
=== Dragons' Den ===
Jones is the sole remaining original Dragon on the BBC's Dragons' Den, which started in January 2005 and has continued with a new series approximately yearly. Jones had regular conflicts in the Den with former Dragon Duncan Bannatyne, who appeared on the show from 2005 to 2014.

=== American Inventor ===
He sold his television show idea called The Inventor to the American Broadcasting Company, resulting in American Inventor, which was co-produced by Fremantle, Simon Cowell and Peter Jones Television. Two series of the show were made in 2006 and 2007.

=== Tycoon ===
After signing a "golden handcuffs" deal with ITV to appear as their new "face" of business programming, on 21 September 2006 Jones appeared on GMTV to talk about Dragons' Den and his new ITV show Tycoon, based on American Inventor and produced by the Peter Jones Television company. Five episodes were broadcast in June and July 2007. Tycoon also inspired Tycoon in Schools, a nationwide youth enterprise competition which began in 2012 and as of 2023 continues under the name Tycoon Enterprise Competition, supported by the Peter Jones Foundation.

=== Shark Tank ===
In 2020, Jones appeared as a Shark on the American series Shark Tank and is now a recurring Shark on the programme.

=== Other television work ===
In January 2010, Jones appeared alongside his Dragons' Den co-stars Duncan Bannatyne and Deborah Meaden in the fifth episode of the sixth series of Hustle. Jones appeared in ITV2's Celebrity Juice in May 2010, and James Corden's World Cup Live in June. In November 2010, Jones was a guest panellist in the BBC quiz show Never Mind the Buzzcocks, and in The Magicians in January 2011. Jones has twice participated in the "Star in a Reasonably-Priced Car" segment of Top Gear, once on his own and once with fellow Dragons' Den judge Theo Paphitis.

Jones took over from Gordon Ramsay as the face of BT Business in 2008. Jones is also the Ambition Ambassador for the business software company Sage Group and appears in their television advertising as well as being a customer of the company.

== Honours ==
Jones was appointed Commander of the Order of the British Empire (CBE) in the 2009 New Year Honours, for services to business, entrepreneurship and young people.

== Personal life ==
Jones is separated from his first wife Caroline, with whom he has two children. He lives in Buckinghamshire with his partner Tara; they have three children.

He owns several classic and luxury sports cars.

He is a supporter of Chelsea FC.
