= American Inventor =

- Created by: Peter Jones
- Presented by: Matt Gallant (season 1); Nick Smith (season 2)
- Starring: Peter Jones; Ed Evangelista (season 1); Mary Lou Quinlan (season 1); Doug Hall (season 1); George Foreman (season 2); Pat Croce (season 2); Sara Blakely (season 2)
- Country of origin: United States
- Original language: English
- No. of seasons: 2
- No. of episodes: 19

Production
- Producers: Peter Jones; Simon Cowell; Liz Bronstein; Siobhan Greene; Nigel Hall; Cecile Frot-Coutaz
- Running time: 60 minutes
- Production companies: Syco TV; Peter Jones TV; FremantleMedia North America

Original release
- Network: ABC
- Release: March 16, 2006 – August 1, 2007

American Inventor is a reality television series based on a competition to be named America's best inventor. It was conceived by Simon Cowell and the producers of American Idol, and premiered on ABC in March, 2006. It was organized as a competition between inventors nationally, resulting in one overall winner.

== Premise ==
=== Season 1 ===
Twelve inventors and their products are chosen from a pool of hundreds by four judges. The 12 semi-finalists are broken down into four groups of three, with each episode focusing on a different group of three. Each of the twelve semi-finalists in each group receives $50,000 to improve their inventions and competes to become one of the four finalists. The finalists would then work with a dedicated prototype and design company who would help with expert advice and manufacturing assistance. Each group is assigned a judge who would judge their products that they have invented. Each of the four judges would then choose one inventor from their group to compete in the finals, for a total of four finalists. In the show's live finale, the four finalists present a 30-second commercial advertisement for their product, with the home audience voting by phone for the winner. The winner receives $1,000,000 worth of business support, entrepreneurial counsel, physical resources, and prize money.

=== Season 2 ===
Instead of 12 finalists receiving $50,000 checks to develop their inventions like in season one, six finalists, one from each of the audition cities of Los Angeles, San Francisco, Chicago, New York, Tampa and Houston, will each receive $50,000 and have one month to develop their inventions. The 6 finalists are narrowed down to three based on the judges' preference. Unlike the first season, the three finalists for voting were declared and were voted on by viewers immediately after the second-to-last show.

== Finalists ==
=== Season 1 finalists ===
- Anecia Safety Capsule: A child safety car seat "based on the human womb", named for the deceased daughter of the inventor, shaped like a sphere with a movable sphere inside it, similar to a bassinette. In the event of a car accident, the sphere will move, lessening the force on the baby. (Winner)
- Word Ace: A game that tells you a letter and a number and you have to come up with a word that starts with the letter and has a number of letters equal to the number. (Final 4)
- Double Traction Bike: A bike with a seat on the handlebars. (Final 4)
- The Catch Vest (aka Receiver Trainer Pole): A bar that sits in front of your body to help you catch footballs properly. (Final 4)
- Inside Umbrella: An umbrella where the top part goes inside the bar. (Final 12)
- Head-Line It: A rubber pad to go on top of your head to prevent sweating and itching under hats, helmets and wigs. (Final 12)
- Sackmaster: A large shovel with a bag inside it to make sand-bag filling easier. (Final 12)
- Here Comes Niya Doll: A multilingual set of dolls. (Final 12) The "Niya Doll" appear again in The Toy Box.
- Bathroom Clip: A clip to attach to a bathroom door in case the lock is broken. (Final 12)
- Tonerbelt: An exercise belt (Final 12)
- EZ-X Portable Gym: A portable gym (Final 12)
- Pureflush: A toilet that prevents the spread of bacteria upon flushing. (Final 12)

=== Season 2 finalists ===
- Guardian Angel: A small, pressurized tank of water, disguised as a Christmas package, that is placed under the Christmas tree and attached to a small hose leading to the top of the tree where a fusible link is disguised as an angel. The heat from a fire pops the link and water suppresses the fire. There is also an alarm that works without a battery & intended to suppress (not fully extinguish) a Christmas tree fire and sound an alarm to get people out of the house alive. (Winner)
- 6-In-1 Convertible Brassiere: A convertible brassiere that accommodates the full wardrobe of small frame women with a "C" cup or above. This is a traditional brassiere that converts into six configurations and affords the full back to be exposed with comfort because there is no midsection and it can be worn with full wardrobe. The invention was later commercialized by Maidenform. (Chicago Finalist) (2nd)
- HT Racers: The design and fabrication of custom vehicles through the use of a computer program and patented tools. Intended for use by individuals and groups ages 9 and up for entertainment and educational purposes, this invention is a kit that lets teens design, engineer, and build remote controlled vehicles. (L.A. Finalist) (3rd)
- The Claw: A ceiling or wall-mounted bicycle storage mechanism. The bicycle wheel is grasped by opposing hooks when the central plunger is depressed. Re-pressing the central plunger opens and locks the hooks for bicycle wheel removal. The bi-stable plunger relies on an internal rotary mechanism. (New York Finalist) (Final 6)
- Wrap-a-Way Cabinet: A station to put in a drawer or attach to a cabinet to dispense paper towels, gift wrap, etc. (Houston Finalist) (Final 6)
- EZT4U: A brewing basket that attaches to the common electric coffee brewing machine in order to brew tea. (Tampa Finalist) (Final 6)

== Time slot ==
American Inventor debuted March 16, 2006 at 8:00 p.m. Eastern Standard Time. Each subsequent Thursday, it aired at 9 p.m. until the season finale May 18, 2006. American Inventor aired on ABC and on CH in Canada. The second season began on June 6, 2007, at 9pm on ABC. It aired on Global in Canada.

== Credits ==
American Inventor was produced by Simon Cowell's Syco TV and FremantleMedia North America, Inc in association with Peter Jones TV. The executive producers were Simon Cowell, Liz Bronstein, Siobhan Greene, Nigel Hall, and Cecile Frot-Coutaz. Co-executive producer was Daniel Soiseth.

The makers of the program were accused of modeling American Inventor on a similar program called Million Dollar Idea.

== See also ==
- Tycoon (TV series), a similar show on British TV hosted by Peter Jones.
- The Big Idea, another similar show on British TV.
- Dragons' Den, a similar program that originated in Japan, and also stars Peter Jones in the United Kingdom.
- Shark Tank, the American version of Dragons' Den, which went on to become a more sustained success on ABC.
- The New Inventors, an Australian program shown on the Australian Broadcasting Corporation.
- Everyday Edisons, a PBS series focused on inventors and their inventions.
