= Patton Design =

Patton Design, Inc.
- Industry: industrial engineering technology
- Founded: 1983
- Headquarters: Irvine, California
- Website: www.pattondesign.com

Patton Design, Inc. is an industrial design, engineering, software and hardware, and prototyping consultancy based in Irvine, California. The firm was founded in 1983 by California State University at Long Beach alumnus Doug Patton.

Company staff appeared on the ABC television series American Inventor and represented the million dollar winner with the "Anecia Survival Capsule" child safety seat, the second-place winner with "The WordAce" children's game, and the third-place winner with "The Catch Elite" football receiver trainer.

Patton Design is a patron member of the Industrial Designers Society of America and has won seventeen Industrial Design Excellence Awards.

== Notable projects ==
Patton Design collaborated with the Advanced Research division of Apple Computer on its Workspace 2000 "office of the future" concept prototype. This featured voice-activated and touch-sensitive working surfaces intended to provide interactive computing facilities, together with a curved partition that could also be used as a screen to "teleconference" with remote colleagues. The computational aspect of these working surfaces were to be provided by clip-on personality modules or "P-Mods". A range of office furniture accessories and devices were also proposed, including "computer pads" or tablets such as the approximately A4-sized Notepad and a pocket computer with a roll-out screen known as the Scroll. The project was completed during 1988, and in 1990, Patton suggested that "three or four other ideas" had since been developed in conjunction with Apple for potential products. Apple reportedly received much interest from individuals and furniture manufacturers, even compiling a shortlist for further collaborations, but the company made no further commitment to continuing such efforts.
