= Doug Richard =

American entrepreneur based in England

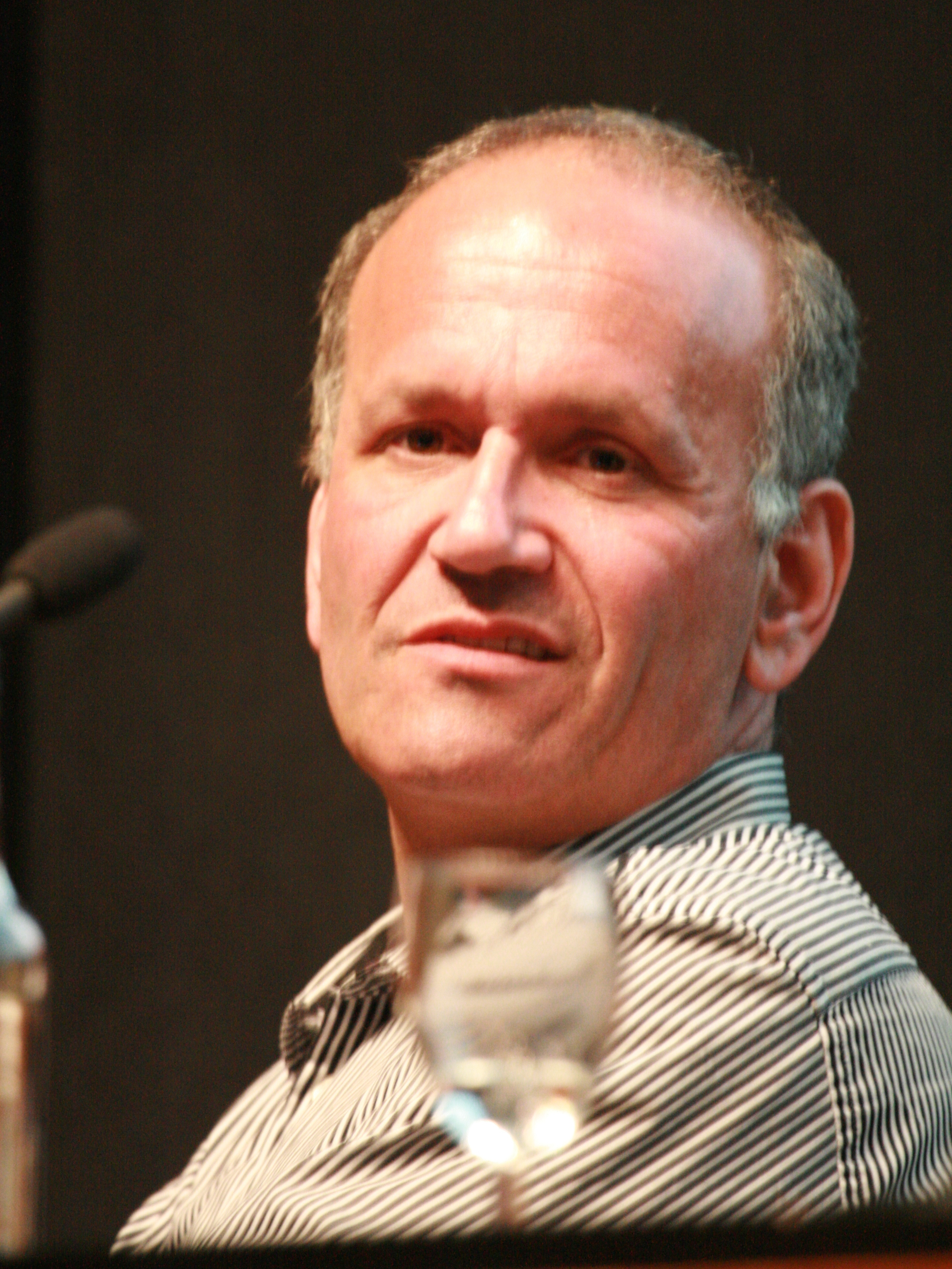
- Doug Richard in 2009
- Born: 6 May 1958 (age 68); Buffalo, New York, U.S.
- Education: University of California
- Occupations: Entrepreneur, businessman, government advisor
- Known for: Dragons' Den
- Children: 3
- Awards: The Queen's Award for Achievement in Enterprise Promotion

Doug Richard (born 6 May 1958) is an American entrepreneur best known for his television appearances in the United Kingdom. He appeared as a "Dragon" on the first two series of Dragons' Den and was also a government adviser.

== Education ==
Richard received his undergraduate degree from University of California at Berkeley majoring in psychology in 1980. He received his Doctorate of Law at University of California at Los Angeles in 1985. He received his Executive Management Certificate from UCLA School of Business in 1989.

== Business background ==
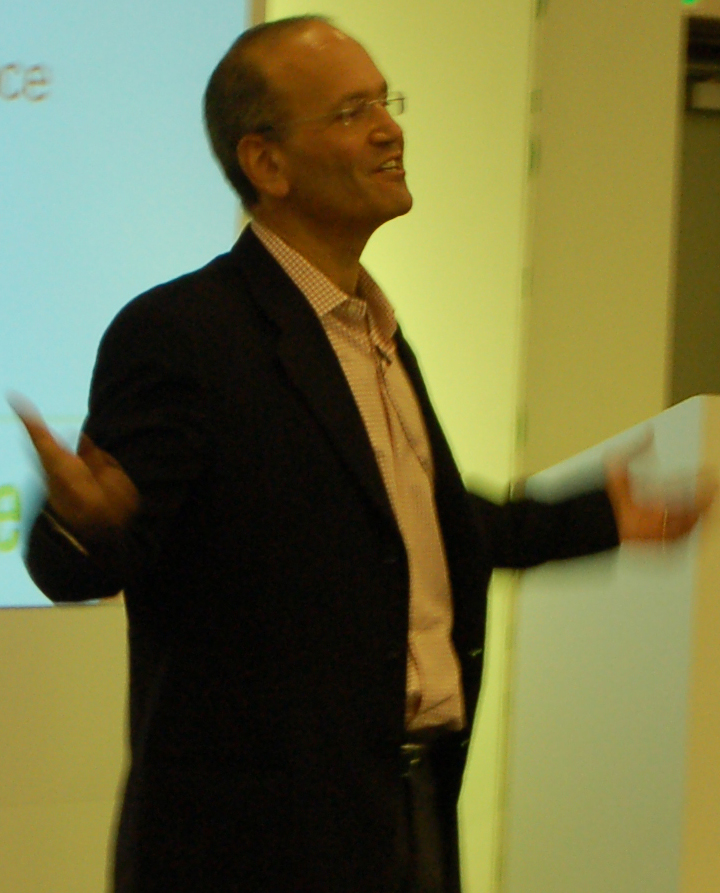
Richard giving a speech, in 2006, at a B2B Expo event

Richard founded his first company, ITAL Computers in 1985, which sold services that integrated computer-aided design and manufacture systems to the southern California aerospace industry. ITAL Computers was sold in a private transaction in 1991 and the profits were used to found his second company, Visual Software. Richard co-founded, managed and sold Visual Software with his partner John Halloran. Visual Software was sold to Micrografx, a NASDAQ listed public company for $12,000,000 in shares in 1996. In 1997, Richard became the president and CEO of Micrografx, the company by whom he had been acquired the year before. Richard turned around the fortunes of Micrografx by shifting its focus from consumer software to business and technical marketplaces. Micrografx was sold to Corel Corporation in 2001.

After the sale of Corel Corporation, Richard re-located to Cambridge with his family. Shortly after the move, Richard co-founded the Cambridge Angels, an angel investment group focusing on technology startups in the Cambridge region, with Robert Sansom in 2001. He retired from the Cambridge Angels in 2008.

Richard was an active angel investor from 2001 to 2008. His first investment was in a Manchester based startup, Designer Servers, known as DSVR. Richard and the founders successfully exited from the company in 2004 when it was sold to the company that became Legend Communications, PLC.

Also in 2001, Richard co-founded Library House with a group of entrepreneurs and angel investors from the Cambridge Cluster. Library House was founded as a buy-side research house focusing on technology startups and bespoke analysis for venture capital firms. The financial downturn in 2008 led venture firms to reduce their investments in research forcing Library House into administration as another victim of the global downturn. Its database of transactions, which was the only database of European venture activity, was sold to Dow Jones.

In 2004, Richard co-founded Trutap with David Whitewood. It was a mobile software company offering free text and interactive messaging across the internet, prior to the introduction of smart phones. Trutap received three rounds of funding from two investors, Tudor Investments and the Cambridge Angels. The company closed in good order and the remaining investment was returned to Investors after the company was unable to pivot with the introduction and success of the iPhone. In 2008, Richard founded School for Startups Ltd.

== Dragons' Den ==
In late 2004, Richard was approached by the BBC to join a new reality TV show called Dragons' Den. Richard was joined by Peter Jones, Duncan Bannatyne, Rachel Elnaugh and Simon Woodroffe as the first 'Dragons'. Richard appeared on the first two series of the programme. He voluntarily stepped down, alongside fellow Dragon Rachel Elnaugh after the end of the second series after accepting a position as a venture partner with the hedge fund Tudor Investments. He and Elnaugh were replaced by Richard Farleigh and Deborah Meaden.

== Awards and recognition ==
In 2006, he received an honorary Queen's Award for Enterprise Promotion. The award was honorary as Richard was a US citizen.

In 2009, Richard was awarded an honorary doctorate from the University of Essex for his work supporting entrepreneurship.

In 2010, he was awarded Enterprise Educator of the Year by National Council on Graduate Entreprise.

In 2013, Richard was awarded an honorary doctorate from University of Plymouth for his work with Plymouth in supporting the growth of small business in the south west.

Richard was appointed as an ambassador for the British Library's Business and IP Centre.

He is a fellow of the Royal Society of the Arts.

== Publications and government advisory work ==
In 2008, Richard wrote and published the Richard Report on Small Business, as the Chairman of the Conservative Party Task Force, a policy guideline on support for small business for the Conservative Party while in opposition.

In 2010, Richard published the “Entrepreneurs Manifesto”, a call-to-action to drive entrepreneurship in the UK.

In 2012, Richard published the Richard Review of Apprenticeships, a government requested review of the apprenticeship system which was supported by all political parties and formed the basis for the reform of the apprenticeship system in the UK.

In 2013, Richard published his first Book, “How to Start a Creative Business”, on entrepreneurship in the creative industries.

== Board memberships and non profits ==
Richard served as a Counsellor at One Young World in 2012, 2013, and 2015.

Richard is a former non-executive director of Innovate UK, the UK's Innovation Agency.

== School for Startups ==
Richard founded School for Startups in 2008 to help people start their own businesses through training and support courses, and to help governments and regions drive economic growth based on the principles of entrepreneurial economics. The school has taught over 30,000 people how to start their own business. The school is best known for a series of high-profile programmes including:

- School for Creative Startups, an accelerator for creative businesses,
- The Launcher Programme, a social lending partner of the Startup Loan Company,
- The Southwest Peninsula Programme, in partnership with the Regional Growth Fund, to help new businesses in the southwest region,
- Web Fuelled Business, bootcamps funded by the Department of Business, Innovation & Skills designed to help small businesses use the web to maximise sales, save money and go global.
- Windows of Opportunity, a series of bootcamps providing instruction on raising and investing money and funded by the Department of Business, Innovation & Skills.
- The Makegood Festival, an annual celebration of creativity and entrepreneurship running across a four-day festival, winner of the 2014 London Design Award.
- The Nigeria Youth With Education Programme, This program, funded by the Department for International Development UK and the Nigerian Ministry of Finance, delivered free tuition through full day bootcamps, mentoring and distant learning support to young entrepreneurs in Nigeria.
- The School for Startups Romania. This 12-month learning program ran for two years, was offered in two major Romanian cities: Bucharest and Cluj over a two-year period. The EU institution, The Post Privatization Foundation, supported the program.

More recently Richard has focussed School for Startups on programs in developing countries. Recent programs include:

- The Colombia Creative program, a program funded by Innpulsa, the Innovation arm of the Colombian government, which taught and mentored Colombian startups in the creative industries become ready to go global
- The San Andres Projects, a series of project, focused on the Colombian department of San Andrés, Providencia y Santa Catalina, with the remit to re-shape the local tourism economy to permit more participation by local small businesses and entrepreneurs. The first stage was funded by a grant from the Foreign and Commonwealth's Prosperity Fund and the second stage was funded by the Colombian vice-ministry of Tourism and
- The Aldea program, a program initiated by Innpulsa to mentor small Colombian innovation businesses.

== Allegations of Child Sex Offences ==
In January 2015, the Daily Mirror reported that Richard had been arrested on suspicion of rape involving a 13-year-old girl. Richard strongly denied the allegations.

On 7 September 2015, Richard was charged. He appeared before the City of London Magistrates' Court on 5 October and was bailed until his appearance at the Old Bailey in January 2016 for trial.

On 25 January 2016, Richard appeared at the Old Bailey, where he admitted sexual activity did occur with the 13-year-old girl but said it was consensual, believing her to be 17 at the time. On 29 January 2016, Richard was cleared of all charges against him.
