= The Agenda with Tom Bradby =

British television series

- Former title card
- Genre: Politics; Current affairs
- Directed by: Rob Hopkin
- Presented by: Tom Bradby
- Country of origin: United Kingdom
- No. of series: 9
- No. of episodes: 84

Production
- Executive producer: Chris Shaw
- Producers: ITN Productions for ITV News & Current Affairs
- Production locations: The Hospital Club; The London Studios (2016; 2 episodes)
- Running time: 30 minutes (2012–14); 45 minutes (2015—16); 60 minutes (2016; 2 episodes) (inc. adverts)

Original release
- Network: ITV
- Release: 27 February 2012 – 28 November 2016

Related
- ITV News; Peston

The Agenda is a political discussion programme on British television network ITV, broadcast on Monday evenings from 10.45pm. The programme was presented by ITV News anchor Tom Bradby and was first broadcast on 27 February 2012 and it ran for nine series until the show's cancellation on 28 November 2016.

In each episode, Bradby was joined by four guests to discuss the biggest news stories of the previous week and then talk about the week ahead. Guests have included David Cameron, Nick Clegg and Boris Johnson. The programme did not return after 9 series, running until 2016.

== Episode Guide ==
| Series | Start date | End date | Episodes |
|---|---|---|---|
| 1 | 27 February 2012 | 23 April 2012 | 8 |
| 2 | 15 October 2012 | 3 December 2012 | 8 |
| 3 | 28 January 2013 | 18 March 2013 | 8 |
| 4 | 7 October 2013 | 9 December 2013 | 10 |
| 5 | 10 February 2014 | 14 April 2014 | 10 |
| 6 | 6 October 2014 | 8 December 2014 | 10 |
| 7 | 2 April 2015 | 11 May 2015 | 10 |
| 8 | 22 February 2016 | 2 May 2016 | 10 |
| 9 | 26 September 2016 | 28 November 2016 | 10 |

=== Series 1 ===
| Episode | Panellists | Original broadcast date |
|---|---|---|
| 1 | Boris Johnson, Jenny Agutter, Allison Pearson and Brendan Barber | 27 February 2012 |
| 2 | Nick Clegg, Mariella Frostrup, Rachel Sylvester and Digby Jones | 5 March 2012 |
| 3 | Yvette Cooper, Fraser Nelson, James Caan and Rachel Johnson | 12 March 2012 |
| 4 | Alistair Darling, Amanda Platell, Andy Street and Fiona Shaw | 19 March 2012 |
| 5 | William Hague, Tanni Grey-Thompson, Anthony Horowitz and Jane Moore | 26 March 2012 |
| 6 | Ross Kemp, Martin Sorrell, Margot James and Joan Bakewell. | 2 April 2012 |
| 7 | Ed Miliband, Victoria Coren, Joanna Trollope and Peter Bazalgette | 16 April 2012 |
| 8 | Michael Heseltine, Christopher Meyer, Mariella Frostrup and Germaine Greer | 23 April 2012 |

=== Series 2 ===
| Episode | Panellists | Original broadcast date |
|---|---|---|
| 1 | Ed Miliband, Jo Brand, Max Hastings and Ulrika Jonsson | 15 October 2012 |
| 2 | David Cameron, Stella Rimington, Julian Fellowes and Rebecca Front | 22 October 2012 |
| 3 | Nick Clegg, Victoria Coren, Sarah Sands and Greg Dyke | 29 October 2012 |
| 4 | Douglas Alexander, Germaine Greer, Amy Lamé and Christopher Meyer | 5 November 2012 |
| 5 | Boris Johnson, Hugh Grant, Kate Williams and Jamelia | 12 November 2012 |
| 6 | Patrick Stewart, Harriet Harman, Andrew Roberts and Rowan Pelling | 19 November 2012 |
| 7 | Simon Hughes, Mariella Frostrup, Fiona Shaw and Daniel Finkelstein | 26 November 2012 |
| 8 | William Hague, Jeanette Winterson, Allison Pearson and Andy Street | 3 December 2012 |

=== Series 3 ===
| Episode | Panellists | Original broadcast date |
|---|---|---|
| 1 | Jeremy Hunt, Andrea Riseborough, Jane Moore and David Baddiel | 28 January 2013 |
| 2 | Ed Balls, Mariella Frostrup, Amanda Platell and Anthony Horowitz | 4 February 2013 |
| 3 | Clive Anderson, Nicola Horlick, Fiona Shaw and Danny Alexander | 11 February 2013 |
| 4 | George Osborne, Christopher Meyer, Fiona Phillips and Rowan Pelling | 18 February 2013 |
| 5 | Harriet Harman, Mary Beard, Omid Djalili and Daniel Finkelstein | 25 February 2013 |
| 6 | David Miliband, Deborah Meaden, Michael Morpurgo and Clemency Burton-Hill | 4 March 2013 |
| 7 | Paddy Ashdown, Stella Rimington, Brian Cox and Julia Hartley-Brewer | 11 March 2013 |
| 8 | Fraser Nelson, Mariella Frostrup, John Prescott and Susie Boniface | 18 March 2013 |

=== Series 4 ===
| Episode | Panellists | Original broadcast date |
|---|---|---|
| 1 | Michelle Mone, David Cameron, Allison Pearson and David Baddiel | 7 October 2013 |
| 2 | Harriet Harman, Dan Snow, Jeanette Winterson and Fraser Nelson | 14 October 2013 |
| 3 | Nick Clegg, Esther Rantzen, Anthony Horowitz and Mariella Frostrup | 21 October 2013 |
| 4 | Bettany Hughes, Clive Anderson, Tristram Hunt and Julia Hartley-Brewer | 28 October 2013 |
| 5 | Nigel Farage, Amanda Platell, David Schneider and Jamelia | 4 November 2013 |
| 6 | Chris Huhne, Natalie Haynes, Sarah Sands and Peter Bazalgette | 11 November 2013 |
| 7 | Ed Balls, Nicola Horlick, Christopher Meyer and Susie Boniface | 18 November 2013 |
| 8 | Michael Gove, Ben Miller, Deborah Meaden and Grace Dent | 25 November 2013 |
| 9 | Terry Christian, Heather Rabbatts, Ken Clarke and Stephanie Flanders | 2 December 2013 |
| 10 | Chuka Umunna, Jane Moore, Dom Joly and Julia Bradbury | 9 December 2013 |

=== Series 5 ===
| Episode | Panellists | Original broadcast date |
|---|---|---|
| 1 | George Osborne, Stephanie Flanders, Bettany Hughes and Martin Lewis | 10 February 2014 |
| 2 | Danny Alexander, Clive Anderson, Germaine Greer and Amanda Platell | 17 February 2014 |
| 3 | Boris Johnson, Theo Paphitis, Fiona Shaw and Victoria Coren Mitchell | 24 February 2014 |
| 4 | Fraser Nelson, Dom Joly, Jacqueline Gold and Diane Abbott | 3 March 2014 |
| 5 | Harriet Harman, Martin Sorrell, Julia Bradbury and David Schneider | 10 March 2014 |
| 6 | Jonathan Freedland, Katy Brand, Dan Snow and Sayeeda Warsi | 17 March 2014 |
| 7 | Ed Miliband, David Baddiel, Laura Tenison and Sarah Vine | 24 March 2014 |
| 8 | Douglas Alexander, Mariella Frostrup, Nick Hewer and Isabel Hardman | 31 March 2014 |
| 9 | Esther McVey, Philip Collins, Rory McGrath and Jeanette Winterson | 7 April 2014 |
| 10 | Emma Kennedy, Michael Morpurgo, Vince Cable and Allison Pearson | 14 April 2014 |

=== Series 6 ===
| Episode | Panellists | Original broadcast date |
|---|---|---|
| 1 | Ed Balls, Katy Brand, Jane Moore and James Caan | 6 October 2014 |
| 2 | Deborah Meaden, Rory Bremner, Aasmah Mir and David Cameron | 13 October 2014 |
| 3 | Dom Joly, Julia Hartley-Brewer, Nick Clegg and Nikita Lalwani | 20 October 2014 |
| 4 | Nigel Farage, Sarah Vine, David Baddiel and Grace Dent | 27 October 2014 |
| 5 | Chuka Umunna, Susie Boniface, Peter Bazalgette and Lorraine Candy | 3 November 2014 |
| 6 | George Osborne, Anthony Horowitz, Michelle Mone and Victoria Coren Mitchell | 10 November 2014 |
| 7 | Ed Miliband, Myleene Klass, Allison Pearson and Christopher Meyer | 17 November 2014 |
| 8 | Grant Shapps, Germaine Greer, Benjamin Zephaniah and Emma Barnett | 24 November 2014 |
| 9 | Danny Alexander, Stephanie Flanders, Charles Dance and Amanda Platell | 1 December 2014 |
| 10 | Mariella Frostrup, Yvette Cooper, Dominic Lawson and Russell Kane | 8 December 2014 |

=== Series 7 ===
The series began on 2 April 2015. Two episodes aired each week in the run up to the 2015 General Election.

| Episode | Panellists | Original broadcast date |
|---|---|---|
| 1 | Rory Bremner, Christiane Amanpour, Grace Dent and Fraser Nelson | 2 April 2015 |
| 2 | Ed Miliband, Katy Brand, Brian Cox and Helena Morrissey | 9 April 2015 |
| 3 | Nicola Sturgeon, Christopher Meyer, Philip Collins and Elaine C. Smith | 13 April 2015 |
| 4 | Danny Alexander, Julia Hartley-Brewer, Aasmah Mir and Benjamin Zephaniah | 16 April 2015 |
| 5 | Ed Balls, Jane Moore, Marcus Brigstocke and Louise Cooper | 20 April 2015 |
| 6 | Jeremy Hunt, Deborah Bull, Anthony Horowitz and Jenni Russell | 23 April 2015 |
| 7 | Nick Clegg, Mariella Frostrup, Rory Bremner and Rachel Sylvester | 27 April 2015 |
| 8 | Douglas Carswell, Camilla Cavendish, Nick Hewer and Jeanette Winterson | 30 April 2015 |
| 9 | George Osborne, Jenni Russell, Amanda Platell and Dan Snow | 4 May 2015 |
| 10 | Daniel Finkelstein, Julia Hartley-Brewer, Aasmah Mir and Tristram Hunt | 11 May 2015 |

=== Series 8 ===
| Episode | Panellists | Original broadcast date |
|---|---|---|
| 1 | Germaine Greer, Philip Collins, Julia Bradbury and John Whittingdale | 22 February 2016 |
| 2 | Jeremy Corbyn, Julia Hartley-Brewer, Marcus Brigstocke and Helena Morrissey | 29 February 2016 |
| 3 | Tim Farron, Juliet Stevenson, Dominic Lawson and Grainne Maguire | 7 March 2016 |
| 4 | Chuka Umunna, Stephanie Flanders, Fraser Nelson and Ava Vidal | 14 March 2016 |
| 5 | Boris Johnson, Mariella Frostrup, Rory Bremner and Jane Moore | 21 March 2016 |
| 6 | Eddie Izzard, Lucy Powell, Luke Johnson and Rachel Johnson | 4 April 2016 |
| 7 | Ed Miliband, Arlene Phillips, Ruth Lea and Christopher Meyer | 11 April 2016 |
| 8 | George Osborne, Grace Dent, Allison Pearson and Martin Lewis | 18 April 2016 |
| 9 | Iain Duncan Smith, Ayesha Hazarika, Martin Sorrell and Emma Kennedy | 25 April 2016 |
| 10 | Nigel Farage, Zoe Williams, David Baddiel and Merryn Somerset Webb | 2 May 2016 |

=== Series 9 ===
| Episode | Panellists | Original broadcast date |
|---|---|---|
| 1 | Ed Balls, Shappi Khorsandi, Elizabeth McGovern and Rachel Johnson | 26 September 2016 |
| 2 | Nick Clegg, Jane Moore, Julia Hartley-Brewer and Alastair Campbell | 3 October 2016 |
| 3 | Kenneth Clarke, Carole Malone, Bonnie Greer and Clive Anderson | 10 October 2016 |
| 4 | Joan Bakewell, Rory Bremner, Anna Soubry, Ed Miliband and Toby Young | 18 October 2016 |
| 5 | Nicky Morgan, Suzanne Evans, Jeremy Paxman, Griff Rhys Jones and Allison Pearson | 25 October 2016 |
| 6 | Diane Abbott, Ken Loach, Tom Newton Dunn and Emma Barnett | 31 October 2016 |
| 7 | Nigel Farage, Emily Thornberry, David Baddiel, Tim Shipman and Jan Halper-Hays | 8 November 2016 |
| 8 | George Osborne, David Starkey, Stacy Hilliard, Alastair Campbell and Anushka Asthana | 14 November 2016 |
| 9 | Michael Gove, Julia Hartley-Brewer, Piers Morgan, Owen Smith and Gina Miller | 21 November 2016 |
| 10 | Justine Greening, Tim Farron, Fraser Nelson, Germaine Greer and Michelle Dewberry | 28 November 2016 |

- Note: Episodes 4–5 were 60 minutes in length and aired on Tuesdays at 8pm. These two episodes were recorded at The London Studios. Episode 7 was hosted by Robert Peston.
