= Peter Jones Enterprise Academy =

- England

Information
- Type: Non-profit Organisation
- Motto: 'Bringing the boardroom to the classroom'
- Founder: Peter Jones
- Website: peterjonesfoundation.org

The Peter Jones Enterprise Academy, formerly known as the National Enterprise Academy, is an educational initiative offering programmes at a number of colleges and schools in the United Kingdom.

== History ==
The National Enterprise Academy was founded in 2008 by the entrepreneur Peter Jones (known for his television appearances on Dragon's Den), through his Peter Jones Foundation for Enterprise. Between 2008 and 2011, the scheme was awarded £3.6 million by the government via the Skills Funding Agency.

By 2012 it was working with 17 further education colleges. From 2018, schools could also apply to take part. For the 2021–22 academic year, 28 colleges were involved.

== Programmes ==
Schoolchildren from age six upwards can enter the national 'Tycoon' annual competition, in which pupils set up and run a business which can receive loan funding of up to £2,000.

Further education colleges (up to age 19) are offered materials and support for BTEC level 2 and 3 qualifications in Enterprise & Entrepreneurship, and/or A-Levels in Business Studies or Economics.

== Controversy ==
In 2011, CEO Tom Bewick quit after only a week in the position. He alleged that the spending of millions of pounds of public funds on the project was "hard to justify" as it was failing to produce the predicted results. An investigation by the Skills Funding Agency at the request of the Department for Business, Innovation and Skills found no evidence to support the allegations about the use of public funds. Jones said that the academy was audited by Grant Thornton and by outside investigators, and no wrongdoing was found.
