= The CRAPPs =

The Communicative Relations Awards from PR Professionals, called The CRAPPs for short, is a UK-based award scheme created to celebrate the relationship between public relations professionals, journalists and bloggers. Founded by British public relations agency 10 Yetis in 2010, the awards are conducted entirely online.

== Foundation ==
The inaugural awards were launched in the UK in November, 2010. They were created by 10 Yetis PR Agency and sponsored by Daryl Willcox Publishing.

When speaking to a Guardian newspaper blogger Leigh commented that "The media calendar is already full of awards, but the difference here is recognising the often-difficult relationship between journalists and PRs whilst having a bit of fun at the same time."

The CRAPPs returned for its second year in November, 2011.

== Selection ==
Throughout the nomination process, members of the public relations industry were invited to nominate members of the British press for a variety of award categories. A shortlist of ten individuals was then compiled in each category (excluding 'most approachable daily newspaper') based on the number of nominations. Users were invited to vote for one person in each category.

== Reception ==
During the 2010 awards, The CRAPPs received numerous mentions in the media. The Guardian, The Daily Telegraph, Press Gazette, Communicate, PR Daily, Pocket-lint, PRMoment and numerous other blogs and media featured the inaugural campaign.

Daily Telegraph city editor Jonathan Russell commented, "My favourite award is for the journalist most likely to tell a PR to sling his or her hook. There will be stiff competition".

Dominic Ponsford, editor of Press Gazette said "The PR industry is getting its own back on the journalistic community with the Communicative Relations Awards from PR Professionals." He continued, "Being nominated for any award by the PR industry has to be a mixed blessing for a journalist, and these ones certainly are".

Ben Smith, of industry news website PRMoment commented that the awards celebrate the "often-contentious ‘special relationship’ PRs and journalists share" and said that they provide "a reason for banter between the two camps".

The awards again received positive media attention in 2011, being featured by The Guardian, Press Gazette and PR industry websites PRmoment and Behind The Spin amongst others.

== The CRAPPs winners ==
=== 2010 ===
==== 2010 Award categories ====
- The journalist that makes you feel warm and furry on the inside
- The 'most likely to tell you to sling your hook' award
- The 'best blogger' PR award
- Least twattish Twitterer — the must follow journo
- Most approachable daily newspaper
- Journalist you'd most like to bring to the dark side (employ as a PR)

==== The journalist that makes you feel warm and furry on the inside ====
- Winner = Ben Moss – sport.co.uk
- 2nd = Adrian Bridgwater — freelance
- 3rd = Tara Evans – This Is Money

==== The 'most likely to tell you to sling your hook' award ====
- Winner = Charles Arthur – The Guardian
- 2nd = Sean Poulter – The Daily Mail
- 3rd = Gary Flood — freelance

==== The 'best blogger' PR award ====
- Winner = Tom Fordyce - BBC
- 2nd = Sally Whittle – Who's the Mummy
- 3rd = Adam Vincenzini – Comms Corner

==== Least twattish Twitterer — the must follow journo ====
- Winner = Harry Wallop – The Daily Telegraph
- 2nd = Caitlin Moran – The Times
- 3rd = Dr Ben Goldacre – Bad Science

==== Most approachable daily newspaper ====
- Winner = The Guardian
- 2nd = The Daily Telegraph
- 3rd = The Times

==== Journalist you'd most like to bring to the dark side (employ as a PR) ====
- Winner = Mark Dye - freelance
- 2nd = Harry Wallop – The Daily Telegraph
- 3rd = Jemima Kiss – The Guardian

=== 2011 ===
==== 2011 Award categories ====
The CRAPPs returned in 2011 with more categories. A category entitled the 'most fanciable journalist (male/female)' award was included and then removed on the day the 2011 scheme launched. Leigh stated: 'The last thing we want to do is cause offence — our intention is to simply highlight the (at best) love/hate relationship between PR people and journalists in a light-hearted way.'

- The journalist that makes you feel warm and furry on the inside
- The 'most likely to tell you to sling your hook' award
- The 'best blogger' PR award
- Least twattish Twitterer — the must follow journo
- Least twattish Twitterer — the must follow PR
- Most approachable daily newspaper
- Journalist you'd most like to bring to the dark side (employ as a PR)

==== The journalist that makes you feel warm and furry on the inside ====
- Winner = Olivia Solon - Wired UK
- 2nd = Vicky Woollaston - Webuser
- 3rd = Vikki Chowney – Econsultancy

==== The 'most likely to tell you to sling your hook' award ====
- Winner = Charles Arthur - The Guardian
- 2nd = Sean Poulter - The Daily Mail
- 3rd = Alan Burkitt-Gray - Global Telecoms Business

==== The 'best blogger' PR award ====
- Winner = Jon Silk – PRGeek.net
- 2nd = Stephen Waddington – Wadds’ PR and Social Media blog
- 3rd = Max Tatton-Brown – MaxTB.com

==== Least twattish Twitterer - the must follow journo ====
- Winner = Olivia Solon – Wired UK - @olivia_solon
- 2nd = Caitlin Moran – The Times - @caitlinmoran
- 3rd = Fleet Street Fox – Unknown – @fleetstreetfox

==== Least twattish Twitterer - the must follow PR ====
- Winner = Andrew Bloch – Frank PR - @andrewbloch
- 2nd = Camilla Brown – Manifest Communications - @girlterate
- 3rd = Beth Murray – Lansons - @bmbm

==== Most approachable daily newspaper ====
- Winner = The Guardian
- 2nd = The Daily Telegraph
- 3rd = The Financial Times

==== Journalist you'd most like to bring to the dark side (employ as a PR) ====
- Winner = Emma Barnett – The Daily Telegraph
- 2nd = Harry Wallop – The Daily Telegraph
- 3rd = Stuart Miles – Pocket-lint
