= Nick Baker (business executive) =

Australian business executive

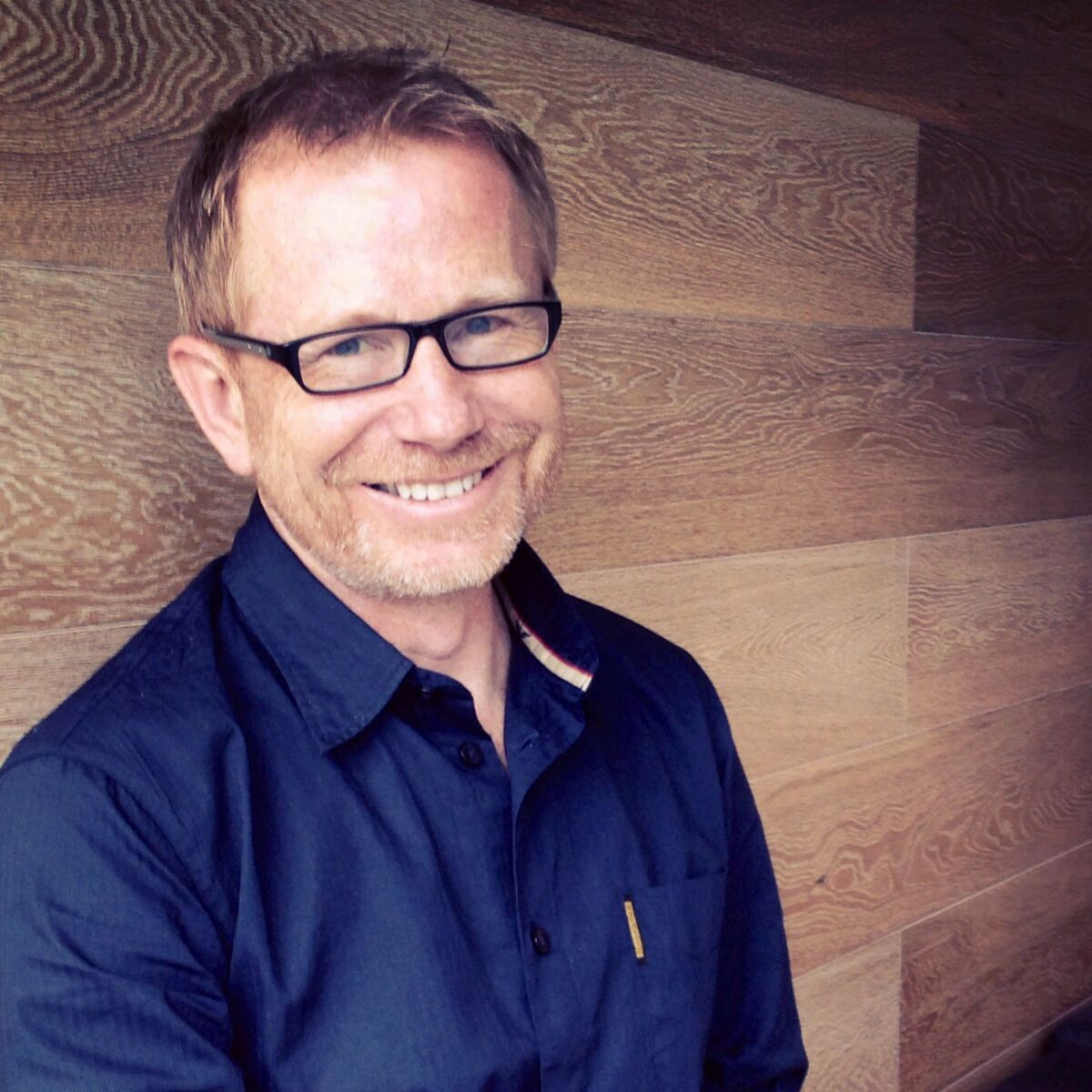
- Education: University of Brighton; Cornell University
- Occupation: CEO
- Employer: Outdoria
- Website: Nick Baker on LinkedIn

Nick Baker is an Australian business executive and CEO of Outdoria. Baker previously worked as the chief marketing officer for Tourism Australia, a position he held from 2007 to 2015. He also served as the CEO of RedBalloon between 2015 and 2017.

== Career ==
Baker was the executive general manager of marketing for Ayers Rock Resort when it acquired P&O Resorts. Baker worked his way up through operations before starting his career in marketing. He was working for a new hotel opened in Brighton in England when he was promoted by the general manager to sales and marketing manager to help turn around the business. Baker was transferred to Hong Kong, where he worked across Asia in a sales and marketing role, and eventually to Australia in the mid-1990s to work on the Sydney Harbour Marriott Hotel. He worked approximately 10 years for Voyages Hotels & Resorts prior to becoming the CMO of Tourism Australia.

Baker became the chief marketing officer of Tourism Australia in 2007. This was a year after an infamous tourism campaign called So where the bloody hell are you?. Baker was responsible for helping transform the marketing of Tourism Australia, which included the creation of several success marketing campaigns. AdNews credits Baker with implementing three of the most successful campaigns in the history of Tourism Australia, including bringing Oprah Winfrey to Australia which also brought an increase in tourism. He is also credited with integrating social media into Tourism Australia's tourism campaigns.

Baker left Tourism Australia in 2015 and became the CEO of RedBalloon. He was hired to replace former CEO Kristie Buchanan who left the company to start a family. He departed the company in 2017 as part of its organizational restructure. He then took a position as CEO of Outdoria.

== Awards and recognition ==
In 2013, Baker was honored as Marketer of the Year by the Association for Data-Driven Marketing and Advertising. The following year he received the same honor from the Australian Marketing Institute.

== Notes ==
- "Ten Questions with Nick Baker, 2012 interview". The Australian. Archived from the original on 22 October 2016.
- 2012 Interview with Nick Baker by Econsultancy.
