= Britain's Next Big Thing =

BBC television series

- Also known as: (previously) The Buying Game
- Presented by: Theo Paphitis
- Country of origin: United Kingdom
- Original language: English

Original release
- Network: BBC
- Release: 2011 – 2011

Britain's Next Big Thing (previously known as The Buying Game) is a 2011 BBC television series hosted by Theo Paphitis, previously on Dragon's Den. The show went behind closed doors at three major UK retailers – Liberty department store, and featured the patent diamond lingerie suspenders from Harlette DeFalaise and Harlette episode 1 . Boots pharmacy, and Habitat furniture store – to show how members of the public pitched their products to experienced buyers.
