= Into Somerset =

Into Somerset was an inward investment agency for the county of Somerset, England. It worked with local authorities, other economic agencies and private sector partners, to encourage business relocation to Somerset.

Into Somerset was created in November 2008 to market Somerset as a business destination to the UK (especially London) and the rest of the world, and to promote and develop its £90billion economy. It was funded for three years by Somerset County Council and each of the district councils.

Into Somerset aimed to provide help and support for businesses that are considering moving to Somerset, including information and introductions to assist with relocation and business investment. It aimed to find the best place for businesses to grow within the county as well as guiding enquirers to the most appropriate places to live.

An ambassador programme included local business success stories, such as that of Dragons' Den star, Deborah Meaden. Their marketing plan included video case studies and a PR campaign in the national press. In September and October 2009, Into Somerset ran an outdoor advertising campaign on mainline and Tube stations in London, making use of QR code technology on the posters.

In November 2009, Into Somerset made a video to promote the county through its website and through YouTube. It featured celebrities including actress Sarah Parish, conductor Charles Hazlewood, Glastonbury Festival founder Michael Eavis, England and Somerset cricketer Marcus Trescothick, Deborah Meaden, Gold Cup-winning racehorse Kauto Star and his trainer Paul Nicholls.

== Key Industry Sectors ==
Into Somerset identifies five key industry sectors where inward investors can expect strong financial returns. The food and drink sector and the advanced engineering and aerospace sector are already established, and account for some 18,000 jobs. Creative industries and business services are both growing, while the emerging energy and environmental technologies sector is set to play a crucial role in Somerset.

== See also ==
- Somerset
- Visit England
