= Matt Gallant =

American television personality (born 1964)

Matthew James Gallant (born June 25, 1964) is an American television host. He was the host of The Planet's Funniest Animals on Animal Planet, as well as shows on MTV, ESPN2, G4, NFL Network, Fine Living, ABC and DirecTV. Gallant hosted Simon Cowell's American Inventor in 2007, and currently co-hosts "The List" on the Scripps Network. TheListtv.com

== Early career ==
Born on June 25, 1964, in Syracuse, New York, and raised in Westport, Connecticut. Gallant studied communications at the University of Rhode Island where Gallant worked in the sports information department and broadcast university basketball and football games. He held an internship covering sports news at Channel 6 in Providence, Rhode Island. After graduating, Gallant moved to New York where he became a page at NBC and filled audiences for shows such as Late Night with David Letterman. He then hired an agent who managed to find him minor roles in television adverts and soaps. He then moved on to Los Angeles where he auditioned for some small roles. Eventually, Gallant hosted shows including X-Treme Energy, The Planet's Funniest Animals, and American Inventor.

In 2004 Gallant gave the Commencement speech at the University of Rhode Island, and received an Honorary Doctorate of Arts for his career achievements and fundraising & volunteer work with the Make a Wish Foundation that helps children with life-threatening illnesses.
