= Deborah Meaden =

British businesswoman (born 1959)

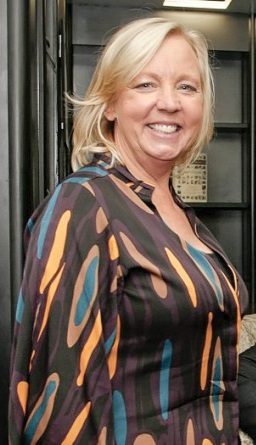
- Meaden after a BBC's Dragons' Den appearance, 2011
- Born: Deborah Sonia Charles; 11 February 1959 (age 67); Taunton, Somerset, England
- Education: Brighton Technical College
- Occupation: Businesswoman
- Known for: Dragons' Den; Strictly Come Dancing
- Spouse: Paul Farmer (m. 1993)
- Website: deborahmeaden.com

Deborah Sonia Meaden FRSA (born 11 February 1959) is a British businesswoman and TV personality who ran a multimillion-pound family holiday business, before completing a management buyout. She is best known for her appearances as a 'Dragon' on the BBC business programme Dragons' Den.

== Early life ==
Meaden was born Deborah Sonia Charles in Taunton, Somerset. Her parents divorced when she was young, and her mother moved Deborah and her older sister Gail to Brightlingsea in Essex. When Meaden was seven years old, her mother married Brian Meaden, who she has said became "a true father" to her. Meaden went to the Godolphin School, Salisbury, for a brief period and then continued her education at Trowbridge High School, which she left at the age of sixteen.

== Career ==
On leaving school, Meaden studied business at Brighton Technical College, after which she worked as a sales-room model in a fashion house. After graduation, she moved to Italy at 19 and set up a glass and ceramics export agency, which sold products to retailers including Harvey Nichols. The company failed after 18 months.

Meaden and a partner bought one of the first Stefanel textile franchises in the UK, which was based in the West Country; she sold out two years later to her partner for £10,000. She then had several successful leisure and retail businesses, including a spell operating a Prize Bingo at Butlins in Minehead.

In 1988, Meaden joined her family's business to run its amusement arcade operations and in 1992, joined Weststar Holidays, a family holiday park operator based in Exeter, Devon, with its major sites in South West England. In 1999, she led a management buyout and acquired the majority shareholding. By the time she sold the company six years later, Weststar was providing holidays for more than 150,000 people each year with an EBITDA in excess of £11 million. In 2005, she made a partial exit when Weststar was sold in a deal worth £33 million to Phoenix Equity Partners, and, in August 2007, her remaining stake of 23% in Weststar Holidays was liquidated when the firm was sold to Alchemy Partners for £83 million, valuing her stake at about £19 million.

In 2009, Meaden acquired Fox Brothers (a West Country textile mill established in 1772 and still based in Wellington, Somerset) along with fellow shareholder, Douglas Cordeaux, former design director at Pepe Jeans London. She was also involved in a collaboration with BBC conductor Charles Hazlewood, 'Play the Field', a weekend of classical music on Charles's farm in Somerset over the August bank holiday weekend 2009. In October 2011, Meaden launched 'The Merchant Fox', an online store selling British-made luxury goods with provenance.

In 2009, a planning inspector criticised Meaden's evidence to his enquiry as "implausible" in a dispute over the granting of village green status to a field on which Mudstone LLP, a firm in which she is a partner, wished to build 48 homes.

=== Television ===
==== Dragons' Den ====
Meaden is known for her appearances as an investor ('dragon') on the BBC Two series Dragons' Den, which she joined alongside Richard Farleigh in the third series in August 2006, taking over from Rachel Elnaugh and Doug Richard. Like Elnaugh, Meaden was the only female investor, although this changed in subsequent seasons with the arrival of Hilary Devey to replace James Caan. As of 2021, she has agreed investments through this route in 63 businesses to a value of over £3.3 million.

==== Strictly Come Dancing ====
Meaden took part in the eleventh series of the BBC One dancing show Strictly Come Dancing, which began on 7 September 2013 and was partnered with professional dancer Robin Windsor. She was eliminated from the show on 26 October.

==== Other appearances ====
- GMTV (2009)
- The Speaker (2009)
- Friday Night with Jonathan Ross (2009)
- Hustle (2010)
- Would I Lie to You? (2010)
- Pointless (2010)
- Loose Women (2011, 2013, 2015, 2016, 2017)
- The Alan Titchmarsh Show (2011, 2012)
- Lorraine (2011, 2012, 2013, 2019)
- Ask Rhod Gilbert (2011)
- Celebrity Antiques Road Trip (2011)
- 12 Again (2012)
- Alan Carr: Chatty Man (2012, 2013)
- Daybreak (2012)
- Room 101 (2013)
- The Agenda (2013, 2014)
- Have I Got News for You (2013)
- Let's Do Lunch with Gino & Mel (2013)
- 8 Out of 10 Cats (2014)
- The Guess List (2014)
- All About Two (2014)
- Good Morning Britain (2014, 2015, 2016)
- Hacker Time (2014)
- Murder in Successville (2015)
- The Great British Bake Off: An Extra Slice (2015)
- The Chase: Celebrity Special (2015)
- Eamonn & Ruth: How the Other Half Lives (2015)
- Harry Hill's Tea Time (2016)
- Insert Name Here (2016)
- Don't Ask Me Ask Britain (2017)
- Sunday Brunch (2017)
- Kevin Pietersen: Beast Of Man, Episode 8 (2019)
- Mandy, Series 2, Episode 2 (2022)
- The Great Stand Up to Cancer Bake Off, Series 6, Episode 5 (2023)
- Celebrity Gogglebox, Series 5, Episode 5 (2023)
- Taskmaster, New Year's Treat (2024)

=== Radio ===
Meaden co-presents The Big Green Money Show for BBC Radio 5 live, alongside Felicity Hannah. The series of weekly episodes began in March 2022 and covers actions being taken by businesses and individuals in response to climate change.

=== Books ===
Meaden published Common Sense Rules in May 2009. She used a ghostwriting service, Professional Ghost, to complete the project. In 2023, she published Why Money Matters, aimed at six to nine year olds, illustrated by Hao Hao. The following year, Deborah Meaden Talks Money was aimed at young adults.

=== Other work ===
In November 2009, Meaden featured in a short film to promote Somerset to businesses, commissioned by Into Somerset, having previously recorded two other short films for the inward investment agency in February of that year.

Meaden is a member of the Council of Ambassadors of the World Wildlife Fund.

She works with the Dogs Trust charity and is an ambassador for the Marine Conservation Society.

Meaden is an ambassador for the National Foundation for Retired Service Animals, a charity launched in 2022 that supports dogs and horses after they are retired from work with the police, fire, prison and border force services.

She became an ambassador for the Tusk Trust in 2010, and joined that organisation's board of trustees in 2016.

== Personal life ==
Meaden met her husband, Paul Farmer, in the summer of 1985, while he worked at Weststar during his university break. They separated, but after she took a trip to Venezuela, she returned to London and they married in 1993. The couple don't have children and live in a period property near Langport in Somerset with numerous animals. Meaden bought the property in 2006 after selling her Weststar Holidays business for £33 million. Since then, the house has undergone extensive renovations using period accurate materials.

Meaden has listed her favourite film as The Shawshank Redemption, her favourite holiday destination as Central and South America and her favourite sport as rugby union. In October 2020, Meaden adopted a plant-based diet.

In the 2019 United Kingdom general election she stated she was supporting the Liberal Democrats, whilst in the 2024 United Kingdom general election she supported Labour. In October 2025, she said "the rising popularity of the Green Party was 'extremely hopeful'".

In August 2022, Meaden disclosed her 2015 diagnosis of squamous cell carcinoma, a skin cancer detected after her makeup artist noticed a suspicious white spot on her face.

== Honours ==
In July 2010, Meaden was awarded an honorary degree from the University of Exeter Business School. She also received an honorary degree from Staffordshire University in the same month. She was given an honorary degree at Keele University in July 2013. In July 2014, Meaden was awarded an honorary degree from Bath Spa University.

At some point she was granted fellowship of the Royal Society of Arts.
