= Bluffer's Guides =

Guidebook series

The Bluffer's Guides are a collection of humorous pocket-sized guidebooks, written by experts and offering readers the opportunity to pass off appropriated knowledge as their own on a variety of subjects. The series has sold five million copies worldwide.

== History ==
The Nebraska-based publishing company responsible for Cliffs Notes, those slim volumes of McLiterature sandwiched between yellow-and-black striped covers, has issued a post-graduate reading list called Bluffer's Guides.

The books are designed to teach readers how to wing it through situations or conversations they know little about - like sex, marketing or the great outdoors.

For $3.95 and no more than 80 pages, the authors skim information off the top of a total of 25 subjects and present it in irreverent, easy-to-read language.

— Julie Bonnin in the Austin American-Statesman, 1991

The guides were originally published between 1965 and 1975 in England, where four million copies of 16 books in the series were purchased. Peter Wolfe, the series' first publisher, sold its publication rights to Anne Taute, a second British publisher. Doug Lincoln, a CliffNotes vice president, discovered the guides while strolling through the Frankfurt Book Fair. He saw a throng of viewers looking at the Bluffer's Guides. Wolfe entered into an agreement with Taute to publish the guides in the United States under the CliffNotes brand.

The Fort Worth Star-Telegram's Terry Lee Goodrich wrote that the Bluffer's Guides have been referred to as the CliffsNotes of life. The books in the series are roughly 60 percent humor and 40 percent truth, Goodrich wrote.

In 2018, the Bluffer's Guide series was acquired by Haynes.

== List of books and authors ==
- Daniel Hudson, author of The Bluffer's Guide to the Cosmos.
- Francis Coleman, author of The Bluffer's Guides to Ballet and Opera.
- William Hanson, author of The Bluffer's Guide to Etiquette.
- André Launay, author of The Bluffer's Guide to Antiques.
- Paul Bahn, author of The Bluffer's Guide to Archaeology.
- Peter Clayton, co-author of The Bluffer's Guide to Jazz.
- Ross Leckie, author of The Bluffer's Guide to the Classics.
- Thomas V. Morris, author of The Bluffer's Guide to Philosophy.
- Michael Toner, author of The Bluffer’s Guide to the EU.
- Boris Starling, author of The Bluffer's Guide to Brexit.
- Jonathan Goodall, author of The Bluffer's Guide to Beer.
- Susie Boniface, author of The Bluffer's Guide to Journalism.
- Keith Hann, author of The Bluffer's Guide to Opera.
- Fidelis Morgan, author of The Bluffer's Guide to British Theatre.
