= Richard Farleigh =

Australian private investor

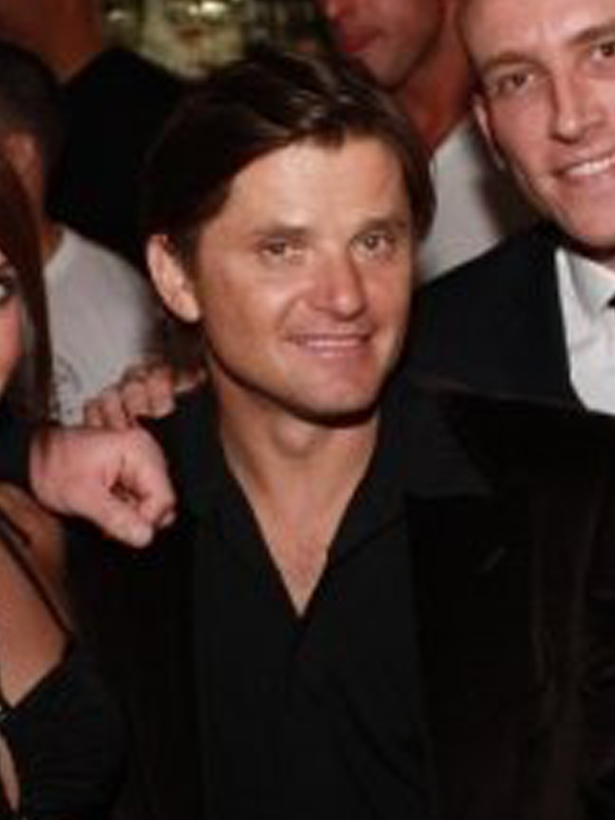
- Richard Farleigh in 2008
- Born: Richard Buckland Smith; 9 November 1960 (age 65); Kyabram, Victoria, Australia
- Citizenship: Australian
- Education: University of New South Wales
- Website: www.farleigh.com

Richard Bruce Farleigh (born Richard Buckland Smith, 9 November 1960) is an Australian private investor and reality television personality. Farleigh featured in series 3 and 4 of the BBC's Dragons' Den. He currently resides in London, England.

== Personal life ==
Richard Buckland Smith was born in Kyabram, Victoria, Australia. His foster family gave him the surname Farleigh. He is a sixth-generation Australian. His father was a labourer and sheep shearer. His parents sent him and his other siblings to foster homes when he was two. He was one of eleven siblings. Richard was taken into foster care by a family from Peakhurst, Sydney. He attended Narwee Boys' High School, played competitive chess, and won a scholarship to study economics at the University of New South Wales.

After graduating with honours in the early 1980s, Farleigh worked at the Reserve Bank of Australia. At the age of 23, he joined Bankers Trust Australia in Sydney as an investment banker and trader, where he worked for ten years.

Between 2012 and 2018, Farleigh was Chancellor of London South Bank University.

Since 2018, Farleigh has served as a patron of Their Future Today, a charity supporting orphaned and abandoned children in Sri Lanka.

== Business ==
Farleigh left Australia in the nineties. He was then hired to run a hedge fund in Bermuda and moved there with his wife and son. There, he befriended David Norwood, a chess grand master, and three years later moved to Monte Carlo at age 34. He worked with Norwood investigating research from the University of Oxford for commercial applications. IndexIT was the company formed to fund some of these ventures; it was later sold to Beeson Gregory for £20 million. At this time, he invested his capital in British technology companies.

In 1999, Farleigh invested £2 million in renovating the old French Embassy mansion in London's Portman Square, turning it into the private members' club, Home House.

In 2005, he published a guide to personal investing entitled Taming the Lion: 100 Secret Strategies for Investing (ISBN 1-897597-62-2).

He was ranked as the 876th on the Sunday Times Rich List in 2006 with an estimated net worth of £66 million. He was also on the Business Review Weekly Rich 200 list, a list of the 200 wealthiest Australians, in 2010.

Farleigh invested in several companies, including ClearSpeed, Evolution Group, IP2IPO, Proximagen, Home House, and Wolfson Microelectronics.

== Dragons' Den ==
Farleigh was selected in 2006 and 2007, alongside Deborah Meaden to appear as an investor on the British version of the business-related TV programme Dragons' Den for the show's third and fourth series. He and Meaden replaced Rachel Elnaugh and Doug Richard. According to the BBC press announcement, Farleigh stated he would be seeking investments through the show. On May 21, 2007, it was announced that Richard Farleigh had left the series, being replaced by James Caan.

== Chess ==
Farleigh played for Bermuda in the 31st Chess Olympiad in Moscow 1994 and for Monaco in the 34th Chess Olympiad in Istanbul 2000.

== ABC ==
In 2014, as part of the Australian Story series, ABC News aired a documentary on Farleigh's life, titled There But For Fortune.
