= Janusz Liberkowski =

- Born: March 9, 1953 (age 72); Nowa Sól, Poland
- Education: Gdańsk University of Technology
- Occupation(s): Engineer, Inventor
- Known for: Winner of the first season of American Inventor

Janusz Liberkowski (born March 9, 1953, in Nowa Sól, Poland) is the winner of the first season of the show American Inventor. His invention was the Anecia Safety Capsule.

He graduated from the Gdańsk University of Technology in Poland in 1981. In 1984 he and his family emigrated to the United States.

Since 1985, he worked for several electronics manufacturing companies located in the Silicon Valley area. He specializes in highly complex problems and forward-looking technologies. Liberkowski improved existing products, provided technical product leadership and pioneered "industry firsts" in multiple industries.

The Anecia Safety Capsule is just one of his inventions; he was awarded fourteen U.S patents and three other are pending.

The death of his daughter Anecia sparked him to invent a safety seat for children. He is married to Danuta Liberkowski, and has twins, Marielle and Jason Liberkowski. On December 2, 2007, he became the winner of the first season of American Inventor. Besides winning one million dollars, he was given an offer from Evenflo for the implementation of his product.

Despite working together for a year, Evenflo and Liberkowski are no longer developing the product together. He is currently looking for a factory to produce the car seats in Europe.

In 2009, Liberkowski was given a title of honorary member at Polonia Technica, Association of Polish-American Engineers.
