= Boux Avenue =

British lingerie store chain

Boux Avenue Ltd.
- Industry: Retail
- Founded: 2011
- Headquarters: London, United Kingdom
- Key people: Theo Paphitis, Chairman
- Products: Lingerie
- Website: www.bouxavenue.com

Boux Avenue Ltd. is a chain of lingerie stores based in the United Kingdom. The chain is owned by entrepreneur Theo Paphitis, best known for his regular appearances on the BBC business programme Dragons' Den and as former chairman of Millwall FC. Boux Avenue launched in the spring of 2011 initially opening six stores across the United Kingdom. With the exception of one store in Gibraltar all the stores are located in shopping centres across the region, including Bluewater (Kent), Lakeside (Essex), St. Davids (Cardiff), Trafford Centre (Manchester), Meadowhall Centre (Sheffield) and Buchanan Galleries (Glasgow). In March 2012, a seventh store in Birmingham's Bullring opened and later that year an eighth store in Merry Hill in Dudley opened. In September 2014, a ninth store opened in Brighton's Churchill Square shopping centre opened. Model Jacqui Ainsley was recruited to be the face of the brand.

The name Boux Avenue was inspired by a French waitress who served Paphitis when holidaying with his family in France.

The store has an unusual selling layout in the UK, displaying the majority of its products in drawers as opposed to hanging rails and stands; a similar manner to American lingerie brand Victoria’s Secret.
