= Tom Bradby =

British journalist and novelist (born 1967)

- Born: Thomas Matthew Bradby; 13 January 1967 (age 59); Malta
- Education: University of Edinburgh
- Occupations: Presenter and journalist
- Years active: 1990–present
- Employers: ITN; ITV
- Notable work: ITV News at Ten; The Agenda with Tom Bradby
- Spouse: Claudia Hill-Norton (m. 1994)
- Children: 3
- Website: Website

Thomas Matthew Bradby (born 13 January 1967) is a British journalist and novelist best known as the presenter of ITV's News at Ten. He was ITV News Political Editor between 2005 and 2015 and was also the host of topical debate programme The Agenda with Tom Bradby (2012-2016).

== Early life and education ==
Bradby's father served in the Royal Navy and Tom was born in Malta in 1967. He is an only child, and both parents have been described by him as exemplary. He was privately educated at Westbourne House School and Sherborne School, before studying history at the University of Edinburgh.

== Career ==
Bradby has worked for ITN, producer of ITV News, since 1990 when he joined the organisation as an editorial trainee. He subsequently became producer for ITV's political editor Michael Brunson in 1992.

From 1993 to 1996, Bradby was ITV's Ireland correspondent, reporting on events including the Northern Ireland peace process, the IRA ceasefire and Bill Clinton's visit to Ireland in November 1995. Bradby later became ITV's Asia correspondent from 1998 to 2001. In October 1999, he was shot and injured whilst covering the riots in Jakarta against the newly elected President, Abdurrahman Wahid: he keeps a framed photograph of the day.

Bradby returned to Britain and began a stint as royal correspondent, covering a number of key stories, including the Golden Jubilee of Queen Elizabeth II, as well as the deaths of Queen Elizabeth the Queen Mother and Princess Margaret. He later became UK editor and then political editor, taking on the role in 2005.

On 16 November 2010, Bradby carried out the first official interview of Prince William and Catherine Middleton at St James's Palace after the couple's engagement was announced. It was reported that Bradby was chosen specifically to conduct the interview owing to a long-standing acquaintance with Prince William. He subsequently attended their wedding as a guest. In 2021, it was reported that Prince William had cut Bradby off for "siding with Harry" after the Megxit affair. Bradby had worked on a 2016 BBC documentary about Prince Harry's charity work in Lesotho and got to know him fairly intimately.

Bradby has since transitioned from reporter to presenter for a variety of programmes: In February 2012, ITV launched a weekly political discussion programme, The Agenda, hosted by Bradby; in August 2013, Bradby presented an edition of News at Ten for the first time; and in May 2015, he presented ITV's main coverage of the 2015 general election. In October 2015, Bradby took over as the main newscaster of the flagship News at Ten.

In June 2016, Bradby led live coverage of the EU Referendum 2016 for ITV News.

In November 2020, Bradby led through the night coverage of the US presidential election 2020 for ITV News, live from Washington, D.C.

On 17 April 2021, Bradby co-presented ITV's coverage of the funeral of Prince Philip, Duke of Edinburgh with Julie Etchingham.

Bradby's interview with Prince Harry, Harry: The Interview, was broadcast on 8 January 2023 in advance of the publication of Harry's memoir, Spare.

On 6 May 2023, Bradby co-presented with Julie Etchingham ITV's coverage of the coronation of King Charles III and Queen Camilla.

== Bibliography ==
=== Colette McVeigh ===
#	Title	Year
1	Shadow Dancer	1998

=== Julia Havilland ===
#	Title	Year
1	The Sleep of the Dead	2001

=== Richard Field ===
#	Title	Year
1	The Master of Rain	2002

=== Sandro Ruzsky ===
#	Title	Year
1	The White Russian	2003

=== Joe Quinn ===
#	Title	Year
0.5	Blood Money	2009
1	The God of Chaos	2004

=== Kate Henderson ===
#	Title	Year
1	Secret Service	2019
2	Double Agent	2020
3	Triple Cross	2021

=== Harry Towers ===
#	Title	Year
1	Yesterday's Spy	2022

=== Dr. Laura Strong ===
#	Title	Year
1	Red Scorpion	2026

== Adaptations ==
Shadow Dancer was adapted by Bradby into a film of the same name starring Clive Owen and Andrea Riseborough in 2012. It premiered at the 2012 Sundance Film Festival. Bradby wrote the ITV drama The Great Fire, broadcast in 2014. Filming began in 2025 on an ITV adaptation of his novel Secret Service, with Gemma Arterton leading the cast.

== Personal life ==
In 1994, Bradby married Claudia, a jewellery designer who is the daughter of Vice-Admiral Sir Nicholas Hill-Norton. They live in Houghton, Hampshire with their three children. Bradby stated in 2007 that he is apolitical with no "coherent set of political views". The couple attended in a personal capacity, both of the individual weddings of Prince William and Prince Harry. Catherine Middleton (as she was) professionally collaborated with Claudia on a jewellery design.

Media offices
Preceded by Mark Austin	Main Newscaster: ITV News at Ten; 2015–present	Succeeded by Incumbent
Preceded by Nick Robinson	Political Editor: ITV News; 2005–2015	Succeeded by Robert Peston
