= Big Red Group =

Australian holding company

- Founded: 2017; 9 years ago
- Founders: Naomi Simson, David Anderson
- Headquarters: Level 4, 1-5 Hickson Rd, The Rocks, NSW 2000, Sydney, Australia
- Number of locations: 2 offices
- Key people: David Anderson, CEO
- Subsidiaries: Adrenaline, Experience Oz, Local Agent, Everything NZ, RedBalloon
- Website: www.bigred.group

Big Red Group is a leading technology business. Powering the largest experience network in Australia and New Zealand. Through its e-commerce platforms: RedBalloon, Adrenaline, and Experience Oz, and as a major wholesaler to domestic and inbound tourism. Founded in 2017. Based in Sydney, the corporation's proprietary platform powers a range of ways for customers to purchase more than 12,000 experiences. These are offered directly through owned brands, via partnerships with domestic players such as Virgin Australia, and through distribution to agents and OTAs across Asia, the US, and Europe.

== History ==
Big Red Group acquired leading ecommerce marketplace RedBalloon and Redii, an experience-based rewards platform, in 2017. Big Red Group later added experience brands Adrenaline in 2018, Lime&Tonic in 2019, and Experience Oz and Experience Oz Local Agent in 2021. Big Red Group has been a significant supporter of tourism regeneration following the COVID-19 pandemic and devastating climate related weather events impacting destinations like the Gold Coast and Cairns. Big Red Group partnered with Destination Cairns Marketing in 2022 to increase growth in North Queensland's tourism sector in a joint venture.

== Awards ==
Big Red Group has been given several nominations and recognitions in human resources such as finalist nominations from The Australian Financial Review (AFR) and Human Resources Director Magazine (HRD). Its employee benefits have had the company recognised by Fast Company Brands that Matters 2021, shortlisted by AFR's Best Places to Work in 2022, and Most Innovative Companies 2021.

== Companies ==
Big Red Group is the holding company for a portfolio of experience businesses:

- Adrenaline – Focused on rides like hot air balloons and experiences like whale watching.
- Experience Oz – Focused on cruises, theme parks, and zoos/aquariums.
  - Experience Oz Local Agent – a concierge and agent ticketing platform owned by Experience Oz.
- RedBalloon – Focused on experiences such as cruises, flying, and skydiving.

== Industry reports ==
Big Red Group produces a quarterly Seasonal Experience Index outlining the data and trends being seen in the experiences industry.
