= Tycoon (TV series) =

- Genre: Reality television
- Starring: Peter Jones
- Country of origin: United Kingdom
- No. of seasons: 1
- No. of episodes: 5

Production
- Producer: Peter Jones TV
- Running time: 60 minutes, later cut to 30 minutes

Original release
- Network: ITV
- Release: 19 June – 23 July 2007

Tycoon is a British reality television show, based on the existing Peter Jones/Simon Cowell production American Inventor, which began on 19 June 2007 at 9.00pm. It was fronted by Peter Jones, who searched for entrepreneurs with ideas that he helped turn into profit-making companies, in which the winner is chosen by the public. The entrepreneurs compete for support from Jones and the other companies' profits. The series also included a viewers' competition in which 25% of the winning company's shares were divided between 2,000 viewers.

After two weeks Tycoon was pulled from its slot at 9pm on Tuesday night due to disappointing ratings. After missing a week, the series returned on Monday 9 July at 10pm, cut from one hour to 30 minutes and reduced from six episodes to five.

The final of Tycoon took place on Monday 23 July on ITV, with Kate Thornton as host. Iain Morgan was announced the winner of the series.

== Entrepreneurs and their products ==
Ages are as of 2007.

Iain Morgan (29), from Portsmouth WINNER: Importing and selling new radio controlled toy helicopters under the business name Bladez Toyz. Morgan was the first of the contestants to successfully bid for additional investment from Jones, having impressed him with his pre-orders for the toys which are manufactured in China.

Cathy Caudwell-Todd (46) and Helen James (44), from Yorkshire SECOND PLACE: A gardening products company initially called Girlie Gardeners and aimed at women. However, inspired by Jones, they changed their name to "Sod" and began to sell sweatshirts branded with the Sod logo. They were the early front-runners in the competition, turning a profit within the first two weeks.

Justin Chieffo (36), from Worcester THIRD PLACE: An environmentally friendly portable carrier bag dispenser. He was hampered by a lack of confidence in pitching his product.

Lauren Pope (23), from Torquay FOURTH PLACE: "Hair Rehab" 100% Human Hair Extension. Lauren's hair extensions would simply clip in and out. She made a strong start, developing a prototype which impressed Jones, but failed to secure funding for a trip to China to source suitable hair for use in the product.

Elizabeth Hackford (35), from London CLOSED DOWN WEEK 3: A natural alcoholic fruit drink for women called Take2. The drink would be made with natural fruit juices and vodka and have an alcoholic content of 4%. Coming into a highly competitive market, the product's branding was seen as particularly important, but Hackford found it difficult to come up with a name which met with Peter Jones' approval.

Tom Thurlow (17), from Cheltenham CLOSED DOWN WEEK 2: A free newspaper for teenagers called Snap News. Although Jones liked the idea and the title of Tom's paper, he lost confidence in Tom's focus and business ability after he hired an ex-editor of OK! magazine to design his paper. Jones felt it lost Tom's touch and shut down Tom's business in the second show.

== Episodes ==
No.	Title	Original release date
1	"Tycoon Show 1"	19 June 2007
The entrepreneurs are in for a shock after Peter has individual meetings and decides to make some changes. Peter finds out who did well in an investment meeting, and Elizabeth's business is put in danger after she calls her juice 'Fruka'. Peter pronounces it 'Frucka' and is very unimpressed with her results.
2	"Tycoon Show 2"	26 June 2007
Peter sets the entrepreneurs targets, and puts them under the spotlight with a surprise press conference. Iain manages to worm his way out of a £10,000 deposit, Tom decides to change his newspaper to a glossy magazine, and Justin fails to pitch well so Peter arranges a meeting for him with Paul McKenna to improve his techniques. Elizabeth makes a sale on her brand called V:Tox but suffers a loss, and Lauren makes a fatal mistake by inadvertently releasing information to the owner of Topshop in a phone call that Peter has arranged. Peter then calls Lauren and Tom onto the pier and shuts down Tom's business.
3	"Tycoon Show 3"	9 July 2007
Peter is called abroad on business and Justin is put in charge. Elizabeth is annoyed and ignores him. She is on the phone for the duration of a sales meeting called by Justin, and she refuses to attend the morning meeting with him as she has a meeting with Big Brother house-mate Grace Adams-Short. Cathy and Helen make some sales to Harrods. Iain finally makes a sale for 250,000 units to Tesco. Iain continues networking gadget shops and successfully selling. Lauren is given another chance with Topshop but does not get a sale; however, they give her an area on the shop floor where she can try to sell her product, and they may consider stocking it if this is a success. At the end of the show Peter returns. He asks the contestants if they would close Elizabeth's business. Everybody would, except Lauren. He initially decides to keep her on, but after discovering that the Portman Group has advised against the use of her product name "V:Tox" as it sounds too much like "detox", he calls her onto the pier and shuts her business down.
4	"Tycoon Show 4"	16 July 2007
The week starts with much pressure as Peter tells the entrepreneurs that the tycoon who has made the least money overall will be shut down at the end of the week. Lauren starts on the wrong foot when her delivery of hair extensions arrives with the name "Hot Gossip" misprinted as "Hot Goosip". Justin spends most of his week lazing about the office but receives a potential offer from Sainsbury's. Business is booming for Iain, who makes a huge sale to Argos which has the potential to make him a millionaire within the year. He is also informed that stockists sold out of the helicopters within hours and have lots more orders. Cathy and Helen launch their product in Harrods and even find a celebrity endorsement. They have a meeting with Wyevale and are told that their prices are unrealistic, but after a revision an order is placed. At the end of the week Cathy and Helen have made the least money but Peter tells them that they have done so well he will keep them in the competition.
5	"Live Final"	23 July 2007
The live final of the show will be similar to the final of WAGs Boutique. The public vote will come to a close and the winner will be announced. The winner will walk away with everybody's profits; with so much at stake they can't afford to lose...

== Critical reception ==
Critical response to the series was largely negative. Radio Times, despite running a three-page feature on the show and making it one of "Today's Choices" for 19 June, described it as "a wasted opportunity". Helen Rumbelow in The Times dismissed it as "a shameless rip-off of The Apprentice", while Paul Whitelaw in The Scotsman declared it "ITV's shameless rip-off of both The Apprentice and Dragons' Den".

Thomas Sutcliffe in The Independent was more positive, suggesting that "it might take", though also berating Peter Jones for trying too hard to emulate Sir Alan Sugar. Ally Ross in The Sun dubbed the show "The Crapprentice", noting that "where The Apprentice filled its hour with brilliant tasks and epic firing scenes, Tycoon has, well, nothing really".

== Ratings ==
Episode 1: The show's overnight ratings for the first episode were an average of 2 million with a peak of 2.3 million, a 9% share and the lowest audience of the five major TV channels in its timeslot.

Episode 2: The second episode of Tycoon attracted just 1.9m (8.8%) at 9pm, only managing to outperform BBC Two by the smallest of margins (19,000 viewers).

Episode 3: Now shortened to half an hour at a new time of 10pm on a Monday night, the show pulled in 1.5 million viewers.

Episode 4: 1.4 million people (7%) tuned in to the fourth instalment of the programme, on Monday 16 July at 10pm.

Episode 5: The live final of Tycoon was watched by 1.3 million people (6.3% of the available audience watching TV between 10pm and 10.30pm) on Monday 23 July.
