= Robert Dyas =

British retailer founded in 1872

- Type: Private limited company
- Industry: Retail
- Founded: London, England (1872; 154 years ago)
- Founder: Robert Dyas
- Headquarters: Wimbledon, London, England
- Number of locations: 93
- Area served: England (mainly southeast)
- Key people: Andrew Hart (Chief Operating Officer)
- Products: Homeware, DIY, small domestic appliances, consumer electronics, gardening, ironmongers
- Revenue: ▲£124 million (2017/18)
- Owner: Theo Paphitis
- Number of employees: 1,300 (Dec 2013)
- Website: www.robertdyas.co.uk

Robert Dyas (/ˈdaɪ.əs/) is a British retailer, originally founded in London in 1872 as an ironmongery. It operates 93 high street stores, predominantly in Southern England, as well as an online business. Its product range consists of home improvement items, electrical appliances, kitchenwares and seasonal stock.

Since 2012 Robert Dyas has been owned by Theo Paphitis, the entrepreneur and long-time star of BBC's Dragons' Den.

== History ==
Robert Dyas emigrated to England from County Meath, Ireland, and with an inheritance of just £5 he opened his first shop in the capital in 1872. By the time of his death at the age of 66 he had established 18 shops. His sons took over after that, followed by his two grandsons who died in 1961 and 2002.

In 1899 Robert Dyas was a founder and committee member of the Cripplegate Photographic Society which later became the City of London and Cripplegate Photographic Society

At St Nicholas, Chislehurst, on Saturday June 26 1953, the grandson of the founder and chairman of the company, Patrick Dyas (1917-2002), married the daughter, Helen (1928-1994), of Donal Morphy, the founder of Morphy Richards. They had four daughters. His father was Samuel Robert Dyas (1877-1942).

Robert Dyas has survived several catastrophes including the Great Depression and the Blitz in which the head office, warehouse and 18 shops were destroyed.

In 1997, Robert Dyas's head office and warehouse burnt down in Croydon; the head office is now in Wimbledon, London, after a time in Leatherhead, Surrey.

In March 2004, Robert Dyas was bought by Change Capital Partners, a private equity firm headed by former Marks & Spencer chairman Luc Vandevelde.

By spring 2009, the company had come close to collapse with rumoured debts of £30 million. Change Capital Partners had lost control of the company to Lloyds Banking Group and Allied Irish Banking Group who owned the debt. Following a management buy-out, backed by the Lloyds Banking Group on 8 April 2009 steps were taken by September of that year to secure its viability through a debt-for-equity deal that gave its lenders a majority stake in the chain.

In 2010–2011, Robert Dyas introduced a new trading format, increased its online offering and expanded the use of web kiosks and browsers.

The company was put up for sale in November 2011 by the Lloyds Banking Group and Allied Irish Banking Group. Following a sale process led by Cavendish Corporate Finance, the company was successfully sold in July 2012 to Theo Paphitis.

By 2026, the company accounted for 4.27% of the market, making it the fifth-largest ironmongery retailer in the UK.

== Shops and products ==
Robert Dyas currently operates 93 standalone shops (down from 97 in April 2014). Shops vary in size from a large 9,000 sq ft (840 m^{2}) right down to 1,250 sq ft (116 m^{2}). Shop count has also decreased at Ryman Limited, likewise owned by Theo Paphitis, with shops closed at lease expiry. This has led to a decreased turnover by 2.5%. Shops are mainly found in London and the south east of England, but also exist as far away as Bristol in the West and Solihull and Kenilworth in the West Midlands.

In 2013 a rolling programme of introducing electronic displays into shops was started. As of 2013, 20 shops have both electronic screens in shops, showing infomercials, plus screens in front windows showing electronic posters. Shop teams in some locations also use portable tablets to help customer purchasing decisions and improve their overall shopping experience.

The product range is primarily focused on housewares, 'end of line' special offers and light DIY. Core departments include kitchenware, vacuums and kitchen appliances, steam cleaning, cleaning chemicals and laundry products, garden care, outdoor leisure, DIY tools and materials, home office and technology. The business has also expanded into seasonal gifting ranges at key times of the year.

== Advertising ==
In December 2015, the company gained attention for its Christmas advert, in which staff and customers announce their sexual orientation while demonstrating products.
