= Michael Toner (journalist) =

British journalist (1944–2025)

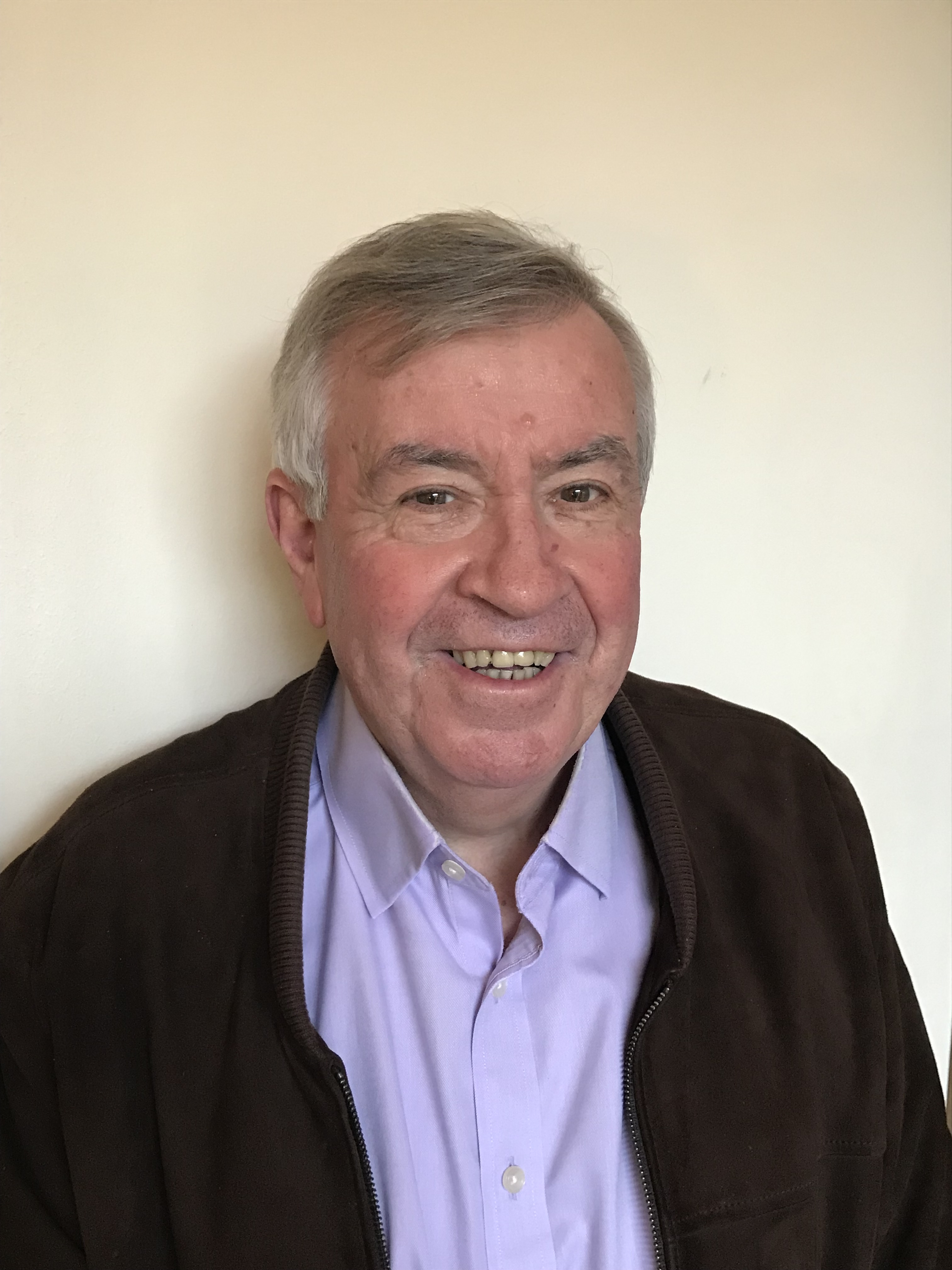
- Born: 29 May 1944; Bedford, England
- Died: 26 June 2025 (aged 81)
- Education: Bedford Modern School
- Alma mater: Sidney Sussex College, Cambridge

Michael Toner (29 May 1944 – 26 June 2025) was a British journalist. He was political editor, diplomatic correspondent and leader writer at the Sunday Express, chief leader writer on the Daily Mail until 2006, a political author, and novelist.

== Life and career ==
Toner was born in Bedford on 29 May 1944. He was educated at Bedford Modern School where he won an exhibition to study history at Sidney Sussex College at the University of Cambridge.

He began his career in journalism at the Stoke Sentinel before moving to the Sunday Express where, in 1981, he interviewed Margaret Thatcher with fellow Express journalist Keith Renshaw. He became leader writer of the Sunday Express where he covered many of the controversial topics of the 1980s and 1990s including articles about the IRA, Britain Fumes at US Over I.R.A. Guns, the miners' strike, the Falklands War, child abuse and the war crime allegations involving Kurt Waldheim. David Alton described Toner's approach to Alton's anti-abortion bill as "thorough and fair".

Following his period at the Sunday Express, Toner became Chief Leader Writer at the Daily Mail, a position he held until 2006 when Tom Utley succeeded him to the role.

Toner's first published work, The Bluffer's Guide To The EU, has run to several editions encapsulating the changing nomenclature of that institution. He published his first novel, Seeing the Light, in 1997.

Toner died on 26 June 2025, at the age of 81. He is survived by his second wife, Lynda Toner, five children and eight grandchildren.

== Works ==
- Seeing the Light. Published by Simon & Schuster, London, 1997
- The Bluffer's Guide To The EU. Michael Toner with Christopher White and Lee Rotherham. Published by Oval, London, 1999
- Bluff Your Way in the City
