= Doug Hall (inventor) =

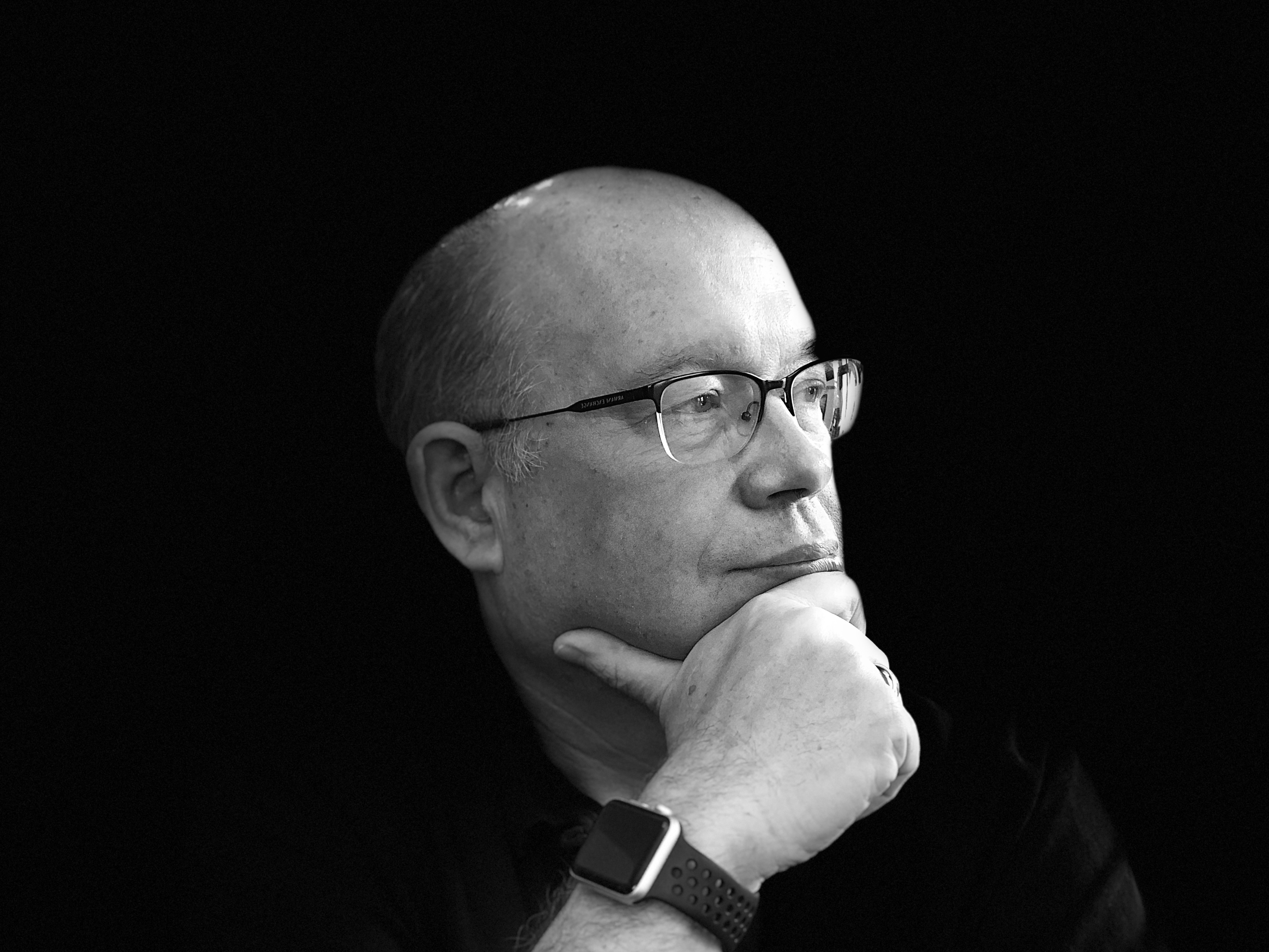

Doug Hall is the founder and chairman of Eureka! Ranch International. He is a lecturer, author, television and radio host. He is a chemical engineer. He was awarded a Doctor of Laws from the University of Prince Edward Island and a Doctor of Engineering from the University of Maine.

== Eureka! Ranch International ==
Hall founded Eureka! Ranch in 1986. Originally designed as a "think tank for hire", the Ranch worked primarily with Fortune 100/500 companies looking for new product ideas. The Ranch partnered with the University of Maine in 2005 with the founding of a new field of study called innovation engineering. Designed as a system based on the principles of W. Edwards Deming and the Quality Movement, it consists of 48 skills designed to instill a mindset of innovation.

== Merwyn Technology ==
The R&D team of Eureka Ranch developed an AI system called Merwyn Technology. This system is used to evaluate abstract ideas before additional effort is used to substantiate it. The system was named after Hall's father Merwyn Bradford Hall.

== Published books ==
- Jump Start Your Brain (Clerisy Press, 2010)
- Maverick Mindset with David Wecker (Simon & Schuster, 1997)
- Jump Start Your BUSINESS Brain (Emmis Books, 2001)
- Jump Start Your MARKETING Brain (Clerisy Press, 2010)
- North Pole Tenderfoot: A Rookie Goes on a North Pole Expedition Following In Admiral Peary's Footsteps (Clerisy Press, 2009)
- Driving Eureka!: Problem Solving with Data Driven Methods and the Innovation Engineering System (Clerisy Press, 2018)

== Personal life ==
Hall is a citizen of Canada and the US. He is married and they have three children. They live in Cincinnati, Ohio; Springbrook, Prince Edward Island; and Aruba.
