= Prize Bingo =

Form of Bingo

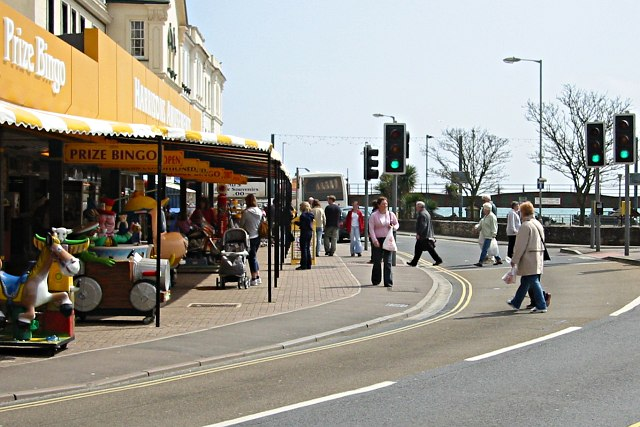
Prize bingo in an amusement arcade in Dawlish, England.

Prize Bingo is a game derived from standard Bingo games which is particularly popular in UK seaside resorts. Rather than winning cash prizes as per normal bingo, Prize Bingo instead offers points to the winner of each game which can be redeemed in a dedicated shop near to or within the Prize Bingo area although some games reward players with free games or tokens.

Prize Bingo is usually found in UK amusement arcades, particularly in seaside resorts such as Blackpool. Essentially, a prize bingo installation is a set of linked slot machines. According to the Gambling Commission regulations, prize bingo sessions should have the maximum stake of £1 and a prize worth no more than £70 - per game, no more than £500 of prizes per game and no more than £500 in stakes per game.

Early forms of prize bingo had a 'ball machine' - this mixed up colour-coded balls with each number on and the machine would release numbers when a button was pressed, these would be announced by the caller and put aside, being returned to the 'pool' when the game had finished, usually via some kind of mechanical device. However, in the last few decades, these installations (if they are still open) have been converted to electronic operation, with most systems now being controlled by some kind of computer. This has many benefits over traditional methods, including less electromechanical equipment to service, and more importantly, the opportunity for faster games, with the winner being automatically verified by computer, rather than having to shout their numbers out for the caller to check. This article is mainly concerned with the modern electronic systems.

== How to play ==
The game is usually played via dedicated consoles connected to a central console where the Caller sits. Players can join a game by inserting coins into the slot on their console. Every console has a different order of numbers. Numbers are generated at random and The Caller reads them out. Most UK Prize Bingo installations have 75 numbers spread out across three different cards. The standard stake (usually 20p) enables two cards to be played while an extra 10p enables the third (usually gold) card to be played as well, increasing the chance of winning. If a player has activated all three cards, they have every number on one of the cards.

The aim varies depending on the individual establishment and the caller. Often, the aim is to cross off five numbers in a line on the same card diagonally, horizontally or vertically OR to cross off the four corner squares on the same card. Some games may be a certain type of line only or no corner squares. Bonus games are also played sometimes where if you create a line in a certain position, you win a special prize. If there are not many players then the caller may decide to play a full-house game instead of a line. This takes longer and thus means less payout for the operator. Often, these settings are designed to be 'foolproof' so the prize amount, bonuses and game types are automatically selected by the computer (which can be configured by the arcade managers for optimum financial gain) depending on the number of players and how many credits remain on the player's machines. The caller usually just has to literally call the numbers and press a button to advance the numbers.

While the consoles are fitted with sliders for players to cover up the numbers being read, unlike most derivatives of Bingo, Prize Bingo is usually configured so that the computer detects as soon as somebody has a winning combination and ends the game automatically, without the need for any intervention from the player. If more than one player has a winning combination, the prize is shared. Some games though require the player to press a button when they have a claim, and only then will the computer check it and end the game (or reject it if the player has made a mistake).

As well as being announced verbally, most prize bingo establishments feature a TV monitor or several that shows the last called number and how many numbers have been called. In addition to this, the consoles often have a small LED display that shows this information when a game is in progress or the number of remaining credits when there is no game in progress.

Prize bingo establishments also usually feature a 'floorwalker', whose job it is to supply change, deal with machine malfunctions and sometimes to offer hospitality, such as refreshments with the aim of encouraging customers to keep playing. Some arcades also give out 'free play' vouchers, these are nearly always only valid after a certain time - again, these are intended to get customers to return.

== Prizes ==
The majority of prize bingo setups automatically release a 'token' (a round metal coin) into the player's winnings tray when they have made a valid win. The number of tokens won each time depends on how many people were playing and which card had the winning line ('Gold cards' typically pay double the wins of an ordinary card). These tokens can be collected and redeemed for prizes in the bingo hall's prize shop or put back into the machine as credits, although it is rare for them to have any monetary value.

== Bingo number slang ==
As Prize Bingo is mainly played for fun unlike more serious forms of bingo, slang names for numbers are commonly used. On a Prize Bingo board, the numbers are usually colour-coded:

- 1 - 15: Red
- 16 - 30: Yellow
- 31 - 45: Blue
- 46 - 60: White
- 61 - 75: Green

The caller usually reads out the colour then the number, i.e. "Red on its own number 1", "Green seven and five seventy five", "Yellow two and four, a Duck At The Door"

== Odds of winning ==
With Prize Bingo, somebody is guaranteed to win every game. While some establishments will not operate Prize Bingo until a certain number of people are there, the more people are playing, the less chance you have of winning. It is a random game of luck with no skill involved, however players can increase their chances of winning by playing more cards, such as the 'gold card' available on many setups.

The most common type of prize bingo operating software allows the caller to appear to 'shuffle' the numbers. Random numbers flash up on the screen. Whether this actually randomises the numbers or just encourages customers to think that they may have more luck with the 'new' numbers is unknown.

== Known Prize Bingo locations ==
=== United Kingdom ===
While prize bingo a part of the traditional British seaside holiday, the number of places it can be played is declining. It is often more profitable for amusement arcades to replace prize bingo installations with high-jackpot fruit machines. None are known to exist south of Great Yarmouth except in Dawlish, Devon. The prize bingo hall in Clarence Pier, Southsea, Hampshire has closed and so have several others. Blackpool, one of the more successful seaside resorts still has several arcades with prize bingo as does Skegness in Lincolnshire. Some of these are only open during the summer months while others are open all year. Most of the arcades in Southend on Sea once had a prize bingo area but now only one remains, a manual setup, in Happydrome at the Kursal end of the 'Golden Mile'.
