= Everyday Edisons =

Everyday Edisons is an American reality television show produced by Edison Nation, featuring aspiring inventors as they seek to launch their inventions into the market. The series aired previously on PBS from 2007 to 2012, returning to Crackle in 2020 with new episodes and personalities.

Featuring real inventors and their ideas, the reboot includes eight new episodes, four judges and 24 new inventors. Everyday Edisons connects inventors with a team of mentors who provide experienced advice in advance of their pitch before a panel of judges.

== Production ==
Everyday Edisons was created in 2005 by Michael Cable and Louis Foreman and ran until 2012. In 2020, Michael Cable and Louis Foreman returned with the addition of Christopher Ferguson, CEO of Edison Nation.

== Plot ==
The Everyday Edisons inventors gain insight on how extraordinary ideas are taken from, for example, a sketch on a napkin to a store shelf. Each episode features three inventors, each of whom has been coached by Everyday Edisons mentors including 2019 PBA Player of the Year Jason Belmonte. The mentors offer expert advice and help the inventors refine their pitch before presenting their unique idea to a panel of respected industry professionals. The panel includes Foreman, Ferguson, and Kelly Bagla, CEO of Go Legal Yourself, as lead judges.

One winner will be announced at the end of each episode. This inventor will receive a monetary prize of $5,000 plus a chance to work with Edison Nation to bring their product to market.

This season will showcase various products ranging from new oral care products for individuals with disabilities to innovative new shovels, blow dryer accessories, 3-dimensional playing cards, customizable blankets, and more.
