= Red Letter Days =

British experiential gifts company

- Industry: E-commerce
- Founded: 1989
- Founder: Rachel Elnaugh
- Headquarters: Farringdon, London, United Kingdom
- Area served: United Kingdom
- Key people: Rachel Elnaugh, Theo Paphitis, Peter Jones, Ronan Tighe (MD)
- Products: Experience days
- Parent: Moonpig Group
- Website: www.redletterdays.co.uk

Red Letter Days is a UK company which was an early adopter of the concept of giving experience day vouchers as gifts and corporate rewards. It is based in Farringdon, London, in the offices of its parent company, Moonpig Group.

The company is now owned by Moonpig Group, which also owns the Buyagift, Moonpig and Greetz brands.

== History ==
The company was founded by former Dragons' Den entrepreneur Rachel Elnaugh, who developed the idea for Red Letter Days after creatively packaging cricket tickets to give to her father. She saw the opportunity for packaging intangible experiences as gifts and established Red Letter Days in 1989.

The business began to take off after placing brochure inserts into national newspapers and magazines in the lead-up to Christmas 1990.

Red Letter Days struggled after a "disastrous over-expansion in 2002."

In 2005, Sir Rodney Walker was listed as chairman in anticipation of listing on the Alternative Investment Market, hoping to float on the stock market later that year.

=== Administration ===
After expanding via supermarket distribution, Red Letter Days went into administration on 1 August 2005; the remaining assets and inventory were bought by fellow Dragons' Den entrepreneurs Theo Paphitis and Peter Jones. They revealed on Alan Carr: Chatty Man that they made the decision to purchase the company whilst under the influence of alcohol. Following the acquisition, Jones and Paphitis said that all vouchers bought on a credit card or by corporate customers had been honoured.

Although Elnaugh was at the helm before and at the time of the company's failure just days after the birth of her fourth child, she blames the problems on the actions of a previous CEO, Simon Vincent, whom she appointed in 2002 but who had left the company in early 2003, while she was in a non-executive role.

ITV1's Tonight Programme offered a more critical explanation of the demise of Red Letter Days, citing unpaid suppliers and disappointed purchasers. The programme suggested that the business model failed to escrow or earmark supplier payment equity, instead using it for working capital. Elnaugh blamed the company's bankers, who placed £3 million in a bond they refused to release for use by the firm, despite the fact that some of it may have related to vouchers that had expired and were not recoverable against the business. It was the funds held by the credit card company under this bond that enabled the new owners to honour vouchers issued prior to the company falling into administration. Mrs. Elnaugh admitted in her book Business Nightmares that her finance team had lost track of the company's voucher liabilities and its debts to suppliers. After Red Letter Days went into administration with a balance sheet deficiency approaching £9 million, Elnaugh left Dragons' Den.

=== Restart ===
Since 2005, Red Letter Days has continued to offer a wide range of experiences, including car racing, skydiving, white water rafting, hot air ballooning, paintball, bungee jumping, and spa days. Under Paphitis and Jones' ownership, the company went from administration to an annual turnover of over £20 million. They sold the now profitable Red Letter Days to Buyagift for an undisclosed price, claiming that "the time felt right and the sale will ensure an exciting and progressive next chapter in Red Letter Days' evolvement".

=== Buyout ===
Red Letter Days was bought by the French multinational company Smart&co S.A.S in 2017, joining other brands like Buyagift, Dakotabox and Odisseias. In June 2019, ownership of the company was transferred to Buyagift plc, and the limited company was put into voluntary liquidation with a declaration of solvency. SmartBox founder Pierre-Edouard Sterin and CEO John Perkins resigned, and a new CEO, Olivier Fajour, was appointed.

=== Moonpig Group ===
In July 2022, the Red Letter Days and Buyagift brands were bought by the Moonpig Group.
