= Susie Boniface =

English journalist and author

Susie Boniface (born 1976 or 1977 in Tonbridge, Kent) is an English journalist and author who has written for several newspapers and uses the pseudonym Fleet Street Fox in her Daily Mirror column and on Twitter and Bluesky. She used the name Lillys Miles while writing an anonymous blog, but revealed her identity when her book Diaries of a Fleet Street Fox was published in 2013.

Today Susie Boniface is recognised for her investigative journalism covering the case of the British Nuclear Test Veterans and their fight for recognition and justice. She has uncovered evidence of serious discrepancies in UK government statements in Parliament and repeated court cases connected to nuclear weapons testing during the Cold War.

This evidence included the discovery of the Nuked Blood Scandal in 2022, in which Boniface established that there was a widespread programme of blood, urine, thyroid and x-ray testing on British Cold War Nuclear Testing troops which had been consistently denied by government authorities. It was later confirmed by an internal UK Ministry of Defence review ordered by ministers.

In 2024 she was Special Adviser to a landmark BBC documentary about the scandal, titled: Britain’s Nuclear Bomb Scandal: Our Story

From 2025 – 2026 she acted as an advisor to the University of Liverpool for their Nuclear Justice Project

== Early life ==
Susie Boniface was born in 1976 or 1977. She became interested in journalism in 1989 after the fall of the Berlin Wall and then reading Bluff Your Way in Journalism (1988) by Nigel Foster.

== Career ==
Aged 18, Boniface became a reporter at the Kent and Sussex Courier. She later worked at the Plymouth Herald as defence reporter. She then joined the Sunday Mirror, where she worked for ten years, until she volunteered for redundancy in March 2012. As of 2013, she was a freelance reporter at BBC, Bella, the Daily Express the Daily Mail, The Mail on Sunday, the Daily Star Sunday, The Guardian, The People, The Sun, Reveal and the Press Association.

Boniface joined the journalism department as a visiting lecturer at City, University of London in 2016.

She has written the Bluffer's Guide To Social Media (2015), the Bluffer's Guide to Journalism (2019) and Exposed: The Secret History of Britain's Nuclear Experiments (2024).

=== Fleet Street Fox ===
Boniface began her first anonymous blog, now removed, in April 2009 and started tweeting as fleetstreetfox in October 2009. She started a second news-based blog as Fleet Street Fox in 2011. She revealed her name in The Times in 2013 at the same time as her book was published by Constable & Robinson, though her identity was not a closely kept secret before then; she had been named on Twitter at least once in May 2012 after an argument with Jemima Khan.

Julie Burchill praised her blogging in the British Journalism Review, but said of the book, "I hated it." Broadcaster Jeremy Vine described it as "the first book I've read that starts at 90mph and speeds up".

=== Nuclear Testing investigations ===
Boniface has investigated the 1950s British nuclear weapons tests in Australia and reported on the veterans' campaign for justice in the Daily Mirror for 20 years. In 2018 she launched a campaign for a Nuclear Test Medal to recognise the service of personnel.

She contributed to the 2024 BBC documentary Britain’s Nuclear Bomb Scandal after attaining an "earth shattering document" containing evidence of blood tests that the Ministry of Defence had claimed it did not have.

== Awards ==
Susie Boniface was nominated in the Campaign of the Year category of the 2009 British Press Awards for "British Nuclear Test Vets". She won third "must follow journo" in the 2011 CRAPPs awards as Fleet Street Fox. Fleet Street Fox won the London Press Club Blog of the Year in 2013. She was nominated for Columnist of the Year (popular press) in the 2014 Society of Editors Press Awards.
