= Theo Paphitis =

British entrepreneur (born 1959)

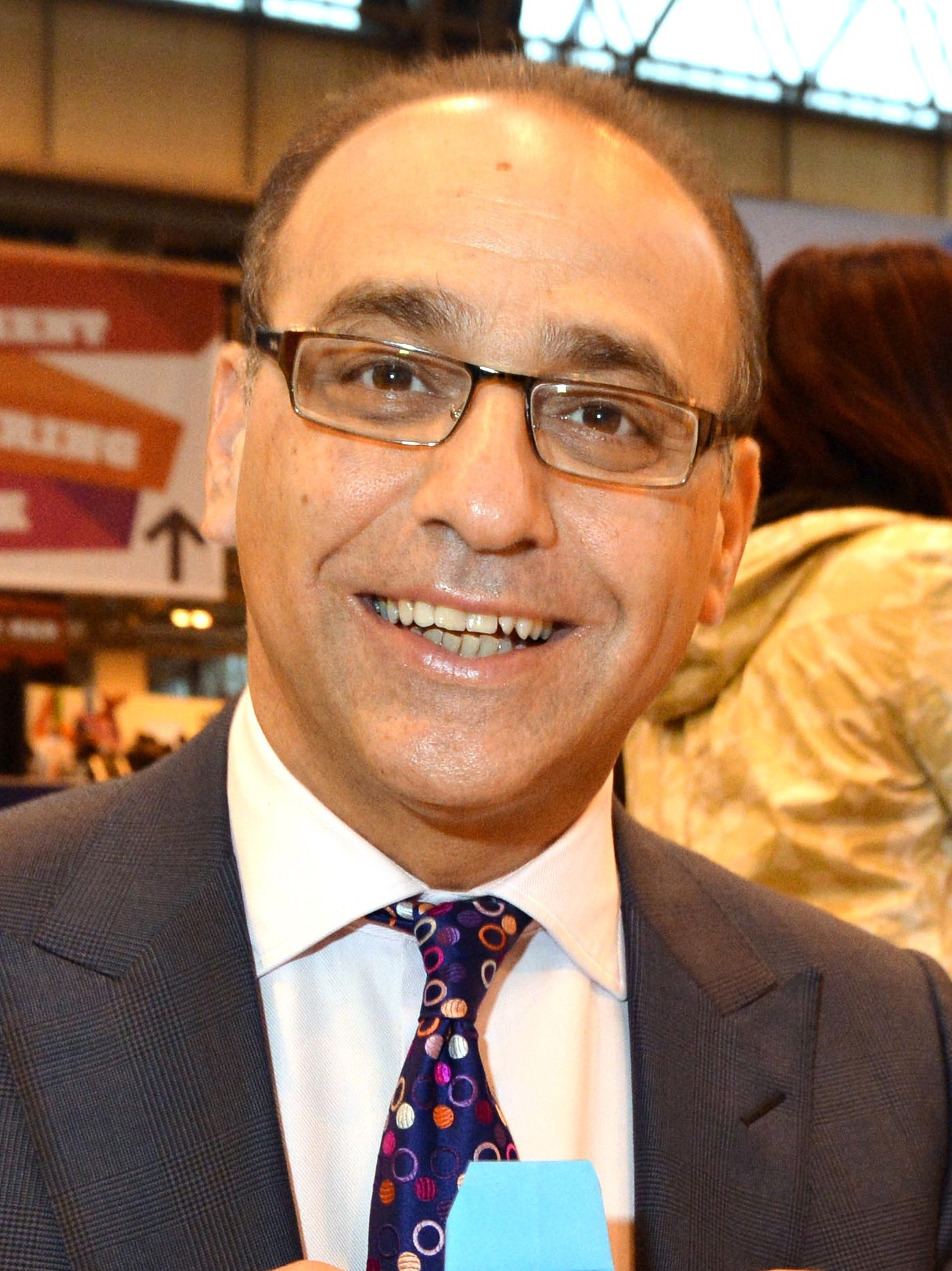
- Paphitis in 2012
- Born: 24 September 1959 (age 67); Limassol, British Cyprus
- Citizenship: Cypriot; British
- Occupations: Retail magnate; Entrepreneur
- Known for: Dragon on Dragons' Den; Former chairman of Millwall Football Club
- Spouse: Debbie Stocker (m. 1978)
- Children: 5

Chancellor of Solent University
- Incumbent
- Assumed office 11 October 2018
- Preceded by: Alan West
- Website: www.theopaphitis.com

Theodoros Paphitis (Greek: Θεόδωρος Παφίτης; born 24 September 1959) is a Greek-Cypriot British retail magnate and entrepreneur. He is best known for his appearances on the BBC business programme Dragons' Den and as former chairman of Millwall Football Club.

Paphitis has made the majority of his fortune in the retail sector. In 2006, he sold his equity stake in the lingerie brand La Senza for a reported £100 million. He is the owner of stationery chain Ryman, the homewares specialist Robert Dyas and lingerie retailer Boux Avenue.

According to The Sunday Times Rich List in 2020, Paphitis is worth £290 million.

Paphitis has been Chancellor of Southampton Solent University since 2018.

== Early life ==
Paphitis was born on 24 September 1959 in Limassol, Cyprus. He is the second of three brothers, with elder brother Marinos and younger brother George. They also share two half-brothers, Christos and Xanthos. Paphitis first lived in Old Trafford in Greater Manchester when his family arrived in the UK from Cyprus. His father then bought a terraced house in Gorton, Manchester where he lived for three years, attending Peacock Street junior school in the area. Paphitis moved to London with his parents and Marinos when he was nine years old.

Paphitis attended Ambler Primary School in Islington and Woodberry Down Comprehensive School in Manor House, where he battled with dyslexia, but began his entrepreneurial activities by running the school's tuck shop at the age of 15.

== Career ==
=== Business ===
Paphitis took a job as a tea boy and filing clerk at a City of London insurance broker. Wanting more money, he discovered his passion for retailing and sales when at 18 he worked as a sales assistant for Watches of Switzerland in Bond Street.

Aged 21, he joined Legal & General selling commercial mortgages, which taught him to read other businesses' balance sheets.

Aged 23, he set up a property finance company with close friend and business associate Mark Moran, and kept going when the friend left in partnership with Hanover Druce, making his first money on the rise of the 1980s commercial property markets. Spotting the rise in mobile telephones, he bought into NAG Telecom, becoming chairman alongside fellow director Tony Kleanthous. Paphitis gained a large market share for NAG by negotiating concessionary positions in Ryman stationery stores.

When Ryman became insolvent, Paphitis approached the administrators and bought the company. He turned it around by improving relations with suppliers, and enthusing the management team, cementing his reputation for turning failing companies into highly successful and profitable businesses. His ventures now include Ryman, Robert Dyas and Boux Avenue. He sold Red Letter Days with fellow Dragons' Den businessman Peter Jones. In 2006, he sold his equity stake in the UK and EU segment of the global lingerie brand, La Senza, for a reported £100m.

In 2008, Paphitis was one of several interested parties in bidding for failed retail chain Woolworths. However, he later pulled out because of unrealistic numbers quoted by the administrators.

In March 2011, Paphitis set up a lingerie chain, Boux Avenue, which has 30 UK stores.

In July 2012, he bought the hardware retailer Robert Dyas, saying: "It is a business which fits well with my investment criteria."

In 2017, Paphitis acquired London Graphic Centre, a specialist arts and stationery retailer based in London's Covent Garden. Paphitis launched the Theo Paphitis Art Prize in 2022.

In September 2025, he became Derby University's 'Visiting Professor of Entrepreneurship' and founded the 'Chancellor's Entrepreneur's Club'.

=== Football ===
As chairman from 1997, Paphitis took Millwall out of administration and on to the 2004 FA Cup Final at the Millennium Stadium. He is perhaps best known for his work to reduce football hooliganism, and appointing as Millwall manager Dennis Wise, and together they guided the club to their first official appearance in the final of the FA Cup and European football. After almost eight years at the helm of Millwall, Paphitis stepped down from his role as chairman in 2005.

Paphitis is a director and part-owner of Isthmian League side Walton & Hersham. Paphitis' other companies became sponsors of the League's cup competitions with Robert Dyas sponsoring cup tournaments. Boux Avenue became title sponsor of the Boux Avenue Women's Cup.

=== Television ===
After appearing on series four of the BBC Back to the Floor series while chairman at Millwall FC, Paphitis was approached to become one of the "dragons" in the second series of the BBC Two entrepreneurship series Dragons' Den in 2005, replacing Simon Woodroffe, and left the programme after series 10 in 2012. Paphitis was known as a straight-talking but approachable and sincere 'dragon' who made many investments on the show, both alone and jointly with other dragon investors. In February 2013, he announced that he would be leaving the show. He departed alongside fellow Dragon Hilary Devey, and they were replaced by Kelly Hoppen and Piers Linney.

In 2010, Paphitis had a three-part television series on BBC Two called Theo's Adventure Capitalists. The series followed British businesses looking to enter new markets in Brazil, India and Vietnam. The series was supported by the Open University.

In 2011, Paphitis presented the seven-part BBC Two series called Britain's Next Big Thing. The series examined the stories of artists, scientists, manufacturers and brand owners looking to sell their products and services to UK retailers including Boots and Liberty.

After time away from television to concentrate on business, Paphitis returned with appearances on BBC's Question Time and ITV's The Agenda. In March 2014, he appeared in Famous, Rich and Hungry, a two-part BBC documentary series which aimed to promote awareness of British people living in poverty, and raise money for Sport Relief.

In September 2019, Paphitis returned to the seventeenth series of Dragons' Den for four episodes, stepping-in for Touker Suleyman, who had been recovering from a short-term illness. In June 2021, Paphitis once again returned to Dragons' Den, this time for its eighteenth series, for three episodes as a replacement for Peter Jones, due to him self-isolating from COVID-19.

== Personal life ==
Paphitis lives with his wife Debbie in Weybridge, Surrey. They have two sons and three daughters, including twins, and eight grandchildren.

Paphitis attributes his success to his natural common sense, and his favourite motto is a famous business school motto: "KISS: Keep It Simple, Stupid". He has said, "There are three reasons to be in business. To make money, to have fun, and to make money."

Paphitis' car collection has a series of personalised number plates, including RYM4N on his Maybach.

Paphitis has been criticised for some of his views on women. In 2008, Kira Cochrane of The Guardian newspaper criticised him for saying that although women may refuse to take maternity leave, "their brains turn to mush" after the pregnancy and "they take three months off".

Paphitis voted for Brexit in 2016, describing the EU as a "failed experiment".
