= Experiential gifts =

Gifts of activities or experiences

Experiential gifts, also known as gift experiences or experience gifting, is an experience that is presented to someone in substitute of a material gift. This typically includes events and moments that will bring people joy, such as adventures, dining, travel and music. Experiential gifts have become a rapidly growing segment within the annual gift industry as it offers a deeper emotional connection than money and material items like handbags, clothes and other goods can lack. It can also be given as a shared experience for the gifter to enjoy with the giftee, resulting in quality time.

Historically, experience gifts were presented in traditional formats such as a hard-copy tickets or physical gift vouchers. Advances in digital platforms, devices, and gift card programs have since enabled more flexible and customised delivery method, resulting in experience gifts now surging in digital delivery, primarily via email or text messages.

== Market surveys ==
Since 2009, the experiential gift market has operated as a multi-million-dollar industry in the United Kingdom and Australia through companies like RedBalloon.

Experiential gifts also capitalise on consumers' growing comfort with purchasing gifts online. According to a December 2012 survey, 69 percent of UK experience days were bought online.

The experience economy has also seen a surge in the USA, with a 2019 report showing consumers were gifting and spending more on experiences. The report found nearly a third of all consumers had spent more on experiences in that year, compared to the previous year.

== Scientific research ==
Research suggests that people derive greater long-term satisfaction from experiential purchases than from material possessions. A 2014 study by Paulina Pchelin and Ryan T. Howell of San Francisco State University found that consumers do not accurately forecast the economic benefits of experiential purchases.

A 2014 survey conducted by the Harris Group reported that 72 percent of Millennials (also known as Generation Y) preferred to spend more money on experiences rather than on material items.

Research by Thomas Gilovich of Cornell University indicates that overall satisfaction with material and experiential purchases is similar at the time of purchase. However, satisfaction with material goods tends to decrease over time, whereas satisfaction with experiences tends to increase. Gilovich also found that experiences generate anticipation during the planning stage, while waiting for material goods may lead to impatience and stress.

A study led by Hal E. Hershfield found that although most people report preferring more money, individuals who prioritize having more free time report higher levels of happiness.

== Experience gift occasions ==
Experiences can replace material items in most gifting occasions. Situations and milestones include:

- Custom celebrations
  - Birthday
  - Christmas
  - Mother’s Day
  - Father’s Day
  - Valentine’s Day
  - Engagement
  - Wedding
  - Wedding anniversary
  - Graduation
  - Baby Shower
- Just because moments
- Expression of love
- Expression of gratitude for a service or gift
- Promotional gifting (to employees or clients)
- Prize awards (in giveaways or draws)

== See also ==
- Alternative giving
- Ethical consumerism
- Green gifting
- Regifting
