= Dragons' Den (British TV programme) =

British reality television series

- Dragons' Den series 17
- Genre: Reality television
- Presented by: Evan Davis (2005–2023); Dominic Byrne (Online)
- Judges: Current Dragons: Deborah Meaden; Peter Jones; Touker Suleyman; Steven Bartlett; Gary Neville (Guest); Tinie Tempah (Guest); Susie Ma (Guest); Jenna Meek (Guest); Past Dragons: Rachel Elnaugh; Doug Richard; Simon Woodroffe; Duncan Bannatyne; Theo Paphitis; Richard Farleigh; James Caan; Hilary Devey; Kelly Hoppen; Piers Linney; Sarah Willingham; Nick Jenkins; Jenny Campbell; Tej Lalvani; Sara Davies; Emma Grede (Guest); Joe Wicks (Guest); Trinny Woodall (Guest)
- Narrated by: Evan Davis (2024–)
- Composers: Graham Reilly; John Watt; Mike Westergaard
- Country of origin: United Kingdom
- Original language: English
- No. of series: 23
- No. of episodes: 189 (and 13 specials)

Production
- Producers: Natalie Richardson; Samantha Davies; Ben Davies
- Production locations: Old Granada Studios (OGS) (2018–present); Space Studios Manchester (2015–2017) dock10 studios (2012–2014); Pinewood Studios (2011); The Depository (2005–2010)
- Running time: 60 minutes
- Production company: BBC Studios Factual Entertainment Productions

Original release
- Network: BBC Two (2005–2020); BBC HD (simulcast with BBC Two, 2009–2013); BBC One (2021–present)
- Release: 4 January 2005 – present

Dragons' Den is a British reality television business programme, presented by Evan Davis and based upon the original Japanese series. The show allows several entrepreneurs an opportunity to present their varying business ideas to a panel of five wealthy investors, the "Dragons" of the show's title, and pitch for financial investment while offering a stake of the company in return.

The first episode was broadcast on BBC Two on 4 January 2005. After 16 series on the channel, the show has been broadcast on BBC One since 2021. Reruns of previous episodes are still broadcast on BBC Two and BBC Three. The programme is produced by BBC Studios Factual Entertainment Productions and co-produced with Sony Pictures Television International, the owners of the format that is distributed worldwide. The show was also broadcast by UKTV channel Dave during the daytime and late nights between 2007 and 2013.

== Programme ==
=== Format ===
Applicants can apply to appear on the show through the BBC website; however, they may also be directly approached to appear. The final selection is based on the strength of idea, a robust business plan, and projected turnover. Selected candidates will have what they believe to be a viable and profitable business idea or already operational business, but lack start-up funding, funds for promotion or expansion. Strict rules apply that they have had no prior contact with the current panel of dragons and will sign a non-disclosure agreement, prohibiting them from publicly discussing the details of their time on the show until it has been broadcast. Between series 1 and 11, up to ten pitches were broadcast in each episode, with four individual pitches lasting around ten minutes each—a mixture of successful, rejected and failed pitches—and up to six failed pitches being shortened to a combined total of less than two minutes appearing between each. From series 12 onwards, four main pitches are broadcast lasting between ten and twenty minutes, with one or two failed pitches occasionally featured in between, lasting around three to five minutes. A BBC spokesman has stated that entrepreneurs are advised before filming that their pitch may not be broadcast for "editorial reasons", and will be informed before the series finale. Entrepreneurs' pitches selected for broadcast are contacted between a week to one month before it will be aired, allowing time for them to prepare marketing campaigns.

As part of their opening pitch, which they are advised to keep to a maximum of three to five minutes, entrepreneurs must clearly state their name, the name of the business, the amount of money they require, and the percentage of equity they would ideally give in exchange. Whilst thirty minutes is alleged to be the maximum allocated length of time per pitch, some are reported to have stretched to two hours. If the dragons believe the business plan proposed is not credible, the entrepreneurs are often subject to ridiculing on grounds that widely vary, but particularly upon knowledge of their financial forecasts/profits and overvaluation of the business. Should they cite areas of the business plan they find desirable or enticing, questioning may pause whilst the dragons think of potential routes to investment. From series 18 to series 20, following initial government guidelines on social distancing stemming from the COVID-19 pandemic, the entrepreneurs and dragons maintained a two-metre distancing, with samples of their products preplaced into a box next to each chair before the pitch started, and did not shake hands on agreeing a deal. These guidelines were discontinued from Series 21 onwards.

If the dragons see overall potential in an investment being made, the pitch will conclude with the dragons offering the full amount of money requested and negotiating the amount of equity initially offered. Offers can range from a single dragon to a unit of multiple dragons, dividing the money and equity equally. The entrepreneurs will then have the opportunity to negotiate further, accept or decline investment. Strict rules stipulate they must be offered at least the amount of money they initially requested and can only accept one respective offer. If a dragon offers less money than asked, then any remaining dragons will have to offer the remainder for the deal to be accepted. Entrepreneurs usually focus on the benefit of working with dragons who have the broadest range of expertise in their field. Negotiations vary in length of time, particularly when complex conditions are discussed. The entrepreneurs are often pressured to relinquish a larger share of equity than they had first planned, frequently leading to negotiations of 'buy-backs', reducing the dragons' equity stake once the investment is repaid or targets are met. Occasionally, the dragons offer more money than pitched for in a bid to compete for the investment, or should they believe that the entrepreneur has undervalued the business. If an offer is accepted, they leave the den with verbal assurance that they will soon be in contact. They receive the respective dragon's contact details from the producers off-screen. A dragon who does not wish to invest will declare "I'm out", and the entrepreneur should not expect any further participation from them, though on one occasion in series 4, Peter Jones continued to question an entrepreneur after stating such. Should all dragons declare themselves "out", or the entrepreneur rejects a final offer, they will leave the den with no further advice.

Filming concludes with the entrepreneurs briefly interviewed by the producers, reflecting on their pitch. Following the on-screen agreement, the pledge of investment will undergo off-screen due diligence before contracts are signed. The producers of the show do not participate in any negotiations following filming. There is no legal commitment for the dragons to fulfil their offers should the process prove unsatisfactory in any way for either party.

=== Set and theme ===
The opening sequence was shot in Ancoats, Manchester, an area transformed by the Industrial Revolution which helped give the city its nickname Cottonopolis. The sequence features shots of Brunswick Mill, Murrays' Mills and McConnel & Kennedy Mills, Manchester's most famous Industrial Revolution–era cotton mills, and their use maintains the programme's warehouse theme. The location at which the pitches are filmed has varied over the years. It was originally filmed inside a furniture depository in Stoke Newington. The production was forced to move after the first series owing to building work next door. For the second series shooting took place in a disused warehouse, Wool House. It was the first set created by production designer Laurence Williams, requiring the construction of a section of the window wall and the staircase down to the lower floor. The owner of this warehouse converted it into flats, necessitating a further move to Tanner Street for the next few series. Here another more extensive set was created, including cutting a hole in the floor and again creating the stairs down to the lower floor. Building work necessitated another move, this time to Pinewood Studios, only two weeks before a series was due to be shot; the production designer had to create a complete set on the film stage, including a staircase which descended down into the underfloor tank. After several more series were shot at Pinewood, the production was moved to the BBC's new home in Salford Quays at dock10, MediaCityUK. A brand-new set was created for the move and was screened in the latter part of 2012 for Series 10.

Space Studios Manchester, in Gorton, was used to film the programme from 2015 to 2017. From 2018 onward the show has been filmed at Old Granada Studios in Manchester. In October 2021, the BBC announced that it was to relocate programme production from Manchester to Glasgow.

Upon arrival for filming, candidates are given a tour of the building and the set before being provided with their own private area to rest and practice before filming commences. Entrepreneurs are entitled to bring an advocate to assist in the pitch should they struggle to answer some of the dragons' questions. Support is provided for entrepreneurs who have a disability and/or underlying health issues. Medical professionals are on-set should anyone become unwell during filming. All participants receive memorabilia from their appearance in the den. When departing the studio, the entrepreneurs will leave separately to prevent spoilers on who was and was not successful.

=== Awards ===
Year	Award	Category	Result
2005	Banff Rockie Award	"Best Unscripted Entertainment Programme"	Won
2006	BAFTA	"Best Features"	Nominated
2007	Royal Television Society		Nominated
2007	BAFTA	"Best Features"	Nominated

== The Dragons ==
Dragons	Series																							
Dragons	1	2	3	4	5	6	7	8	9	10	11	12	13	14	15	16	17	18	19	20	21	22	23	24
Simon Woodroffe	Main																							
Doug Richard	Main																							
Rachel Elnaugh	Main																							
Peter Jones	Main																							
Duncan Bannatyne	Main																							
Theo Paphitis		Main															Guest							
Deborah Meaden			Main																					
Richard Farleigh			Main																					
James Caan					Main																			
Hilary Devey									Main															
Piers Linney											Main													
Kelly Hoppen											Main													
Nick Jenkins													Main											
Sarah Willingham													Main											
Touker Suleyman													Main											
Jenny Campbell															Main									
Tej Lalvani															Main									
Sara Davies																	Main							
Steven Bartlett																			Main					
Susie Ma																							Guest	Main
Gary Neville																					Guest		Guest	
Emma Grede																					Guest			
Joe Wicks																						Guest		
Trinny Woodall																						Guest		
Tinie Tempah																							Guest	
Jenna Meek																							Guest	
Jamie Laing																								Guest

=== Notes ===
- In Series 10, an episode that first aired on 28 October 2012 contained only four Dragons, as Hilary Devey was unwell at time of filming.
- Steve Parish was originally going to replace Nick Jenkins in Series 15, but found he did not have the time and stepped down. He was instead replaced by Tej Lalvani.
- Theo Paphitis was a guest during Series 17 and 18, filling in for Suleyman and Jones respectively.
- In Series 21 and 22, some episodes contain six Dragons; the five main Dragons alongside a guest Dragon.
- Emma Grede and Gary Neville were guests during Series 21.
- Joe Wicks and Trinny Woodall were guests during Series 22 with the returning Grede.
- In Series 23, following Sara Davies’s departure, the remaining four ‘resident’ Dragons will sit alongside one guest Dragon out of Susie Ma, Tinie Tempah, Jenna Meek and the returning Neville per episode. Due to Suleyman’s absence in episode 8, Ma and Meek appeared together.
- In Series 24, following Touker Suleyman’s retirement, the remaining three Den ‘heavyweights’ will sit alongside the returning guest Ma, with Meek, Neville and new guest Dragon Jamie Laing appearing on rotation.

== Statistics ==
=== Successful deals per dragon per series ===
Series	1	2	3	4	5	6	7	8	9	10	11	12	13	14	15	16	17	18	19	20	21
No. of episodes	6	6	8	6	10	8	8	10	10	12	12	12	15	16	14	15	14	14	14	14	14
Peter Jones	3	3	2	4	5	6	6	6	4	10	3	2	5	5	5	4	1	9	11	12	8
Deborah Meaden			4	4	6	4	3	5	4	5	5	9	8	6	6	7	2	6	11	8	8
Touker Suleyman													2	5	6	8	3	8	9	10	9
Sara Davies																	3	10	7	9	9
Steven Bartlett																			9	14	11
Emma Grede (Guest)																					1
Gary Neville (Guest)																					3
Tej Lalvani															8	9	3	12			
Jenny Campbell															9	3					
Nick Jenkins													2	6							
Sarah Willingham													2	3							
Kelly Hoppen											3	2									
Piers Linney											2	2									
Hilary Devey									4	4											
James Caan					6	5	4	3													
Richard Farleigh			2	5																	
Theo Paphitis		4	4	5	6	5	5	5	5	6							2	0 (Note: Despite only featuring in 3 episodes, series 18 marked the first time Paphitis had no offers accepted. This marked the second instance in the show's history that a dragon had not made an investment since Doug Richard in 2005.)			
Duncan Bannatyne	2	1	2	3	4	4	2	6	3	4	2	3									
Rachel Elnaugh	4	1																			
Doug Richard	2	0																			
Simon Woodroffe	1																				

=== Statistics of successful deals per dragon ===
As of the end of series 19.

Dragon	No. of episodes	No. of total seasons	No. of total investments	Investments per episode	Investments per season
Average	-	-	-	0.38	4.30
Peter Jones	207	19	94	0.45	4.95
Deborah Meaden	198	17	95	0.48	5.58
Touker Suleyman	99	7	41	0.41	5.86
Sara Davies	41	3	20	0.48	6.67
Steven Bartlett	14	1	9	0.64	9.00
Tej Lalvani	57	4	31	0.54	7.75
Jenny Campbell	29	2	12	0.41	6.00
Nick Jenkins	31	2	8	0.26	4.00
Sarah Willingham	31	2	5	0.16	2.50
Kelly Hoppen	24	2	5	0.21	2.50
Piers Linney	24	2	4	0.17	2.00
Hilary Devey	22	2	8	0.36	4.00
James Caan	36	4	18	0.50	4.50
Richard Farleigh	14	2	7	0.50	3.50
Theo Paphitis	84	9	47	0.56	5.22
Duncan Bannatyne	108	12	36	0.33	3.00
Rachel Elnaugh	12	2	5	0.42	2.50
Doug Richard	12	2	2	0.17	1.00
Simon Woodroffe	6	1	1	0.17	1.00

=== General statistics ===
Confirmed as of 2014:

- £100,000 is the most common investment figure asked for by pitchers (30 of 143 pitches).
- £35,000 is the lowest ever amount offered for a successful pitch.
- £250,000 is the highest amount ever successfully pitched for in the den.
- The highest amount of equity ever given away in the den was 79% by RKA Records, which was later renamed Bannatyne Music Ltd.
- The most common amount of equity given away in successful pitches was 40%, with 42 of 143 pitches giving up that share in their company.
- Deborah Meaden currently holds the record for the highest number of successful business deals overall with 84 and counting.
- Steven Bartlett currently holds the record for the highest number of successful business deals in a single series with 14.
- Peter Jones is the most prolific investor, offering investment to 54 of the 143 businesses who successfully pitched on the show.

== Successful people ==
=== Investments received ===
Levi Roots's Reggae Reggae Sauce, from series 4 episode 1, is widely considered to be the den's flagship investment to date, estimated to be worth £30 million as of 2023, having received £50,000 for 40% equity from Richard Farleigh and Peter Jones. Jones has cited the business to be the best investment he has ever made on the show.

Wonderland (pitched as Visual Talent Ltd), a high-end fashion and culture magazine pitched by Huw Gwyther in series 1 episode 6, has reportedly attracted many celebrity clients since and a net worth of £220 million as of 2022. Gwyther has confirmed Jones still retains a shareholding and has since praised him for his input.

Razzamataz Theatre Schools, a chain of dance, drama and singing schools pitched in series 4 episode 3 by Denise Hutton, is reported to have launched all over the UK and internationally following a £50,000 investment from Duncan Bannatyne, which he returned for £90,000 in 2014.

ElectroExpo (renamed Chocbox), a plastic housing protection for cables pitched in series 5 episode 5 by Peter Moule, is reported to have made £25 million in global sales since first appearing on the show, accepting a £100,000 investment for 36% from Duncan Bannatyne and James Caan. Bannatyne stated in 2013 that the investment was one of the best that he had ever made on the show.

Magic Whiteboard, portable sheets of A1 sticky paper pitched by Neil and Laura Westwood in series 6 episode 5, is reported to have had sales pushed from an annual £45,000 to £1.2 million, following a joint investment made by Deborah Meaden and Theo Paphitis at £100,000 for 40%. At the time of the Westwoods returning the equity in 2015 for £700,000, it was regarded be the best joint-investment made in the den by Deborah Meaden and Theo Paphitis.

Worthenshaw's (rebranded as Kirsty's), a frozen dairy-free dessert and alternative to ice cream pitched in series 8 episode 1, is reported to have a net worth of £4 million to date following investment from Duncan Bannatyne and Peter Jones. Profits were said to have soared following the business now focusing on adult ready meals. Jones has however indicated he was dissatisfied on the return he made from the business.

Skinny Tan, a self-tan brand pitched by Louise Ferguson and Kate Cotton in series 11 episode 1, is reported to be one of the fasting-selling tanning products in the United Kingdom following their pitch in the den. Though the company was sold in 2015, Ferguson, Cotton, dragons Kelly Hoppen and Piers Linney all retain shareholdings as of 2023 and have expanded the business internationally.

Lost My Name (renamed Wonderbly), editions of personalised children's books pitched by Asi Sharabi and David Cadji-Newby in series 12 episode 2, has gone on to sell more than two million books worldwide since the pitch aired in 2012. Piers Linney has since alleged it is the best investment he made during his two seasons on the show.

GripIt, an aid for fixing screws into plasterboard pitched in series 12 episode 5 by Jordan Daykin, has been reported to be worth £14 million since receiving investment from Deborah Meaden at £80,000 for 25%.

Craft Gin Club, a subscription based gin service pitched in series 14 episode 1, is reported to have reached international success following investment from Sarah Willingham at £75,000 for 12.5%.

In March 2023, Matcha brand PerfectTed accepted offers from Steven Bartlett and Peter Jones of £25,000 each for 5% equity each; after filming and due diligence, the company declined Jones’s offer and proceeded only with Bartlett’s investment. In 2023, following the broadcast, Bartlett invested a further £1 million into the company. In June 2025, PerfectTed became the fastest growing founder-led company in the United Kingdom. In 2025, the investment became the highest valued Dragons’ Den deal to date reaching a valuation of £140m.

Boot Bananas, a shoe-care brand founded by Phil and Alex Osband, pitched in series 22 episode 10, received a joint investment offer of £200,000 from Steven Bartlett and Peter Jones in exchange for 32% equity. The deal made Boot Bananas one of the largest investments agreed on the programme, although its completion following filming has not been confirmed.

Solar Buddies, a reusable sunscreen applicator for children founded by Kelli Aspland and Laura Waters, was pitched in series 20 episode 14, where the founders accepted a joint investment of £80,000 for 20% equity from Peter Jones and Deborah Meaden.

The company was ranked 18th in the 2025 FEBE Growth 100, which recognises the fastest-growing founder-led companies in the United Kingdom, with reported sales of £7 million and a growth rate of 152.26%.

Maiden Cricket, a cricket equipment and sportswear company founded by sisters Honor and Cat Black, appeared in series 23 episode 9, where the teenage entrepreneurs initially accepted a combined offer of £50,000 from Peter Jones, Deborah Meaden, Steven Bartlett, Touker Suleyman and guest Dragon Gary Neville for 25% equity.

The sisters subsequently rejected the investment after filming, deciding that the terms and investor fit were not suitable for the business. They instead reportedly went on to raise more than £400,000 in an oversubscribed funding round at a valuation of £2.1 million.

=== Rejected investments ===
Contestants who rejected offers of investment from the Dragons, failed to secure an offer, or declined investment after filming have experienced varying degrees of success.

Destination London, a board game pitched in series 1 episode 4 by Rachel Lowe, went on to reach a mass-market and design several editions for various companies before selling the business in 2010. In 2021, her portfolio was reported to be worth £94 million.

Trunki, a children's ride-on suitcase pitched in series 3 episode 8 by Rob Law, is considered one of the most successful businesses not to accept an offer in the den, having rejected an offer of 50% for £150,000 from Richard Farleigh. Duncan Bannatyne has stated his regret at not investing having seen multiple, particularly at airports, across the world. Profits grew by up to 68% since the pitch in 2006, before it was sold in 2023 for £12 million.

Tangle Teezer, a range of styling hairbrushes pitched in series 5 episode 3 by Shaun Pulfrey, is widely considered to be the most successful business not to receive an offer in the den, reportedly turning over in excess of £30 million a year. Pulfrey sold the majority of his shares in the company for £70 million in 2021.

Hungryhouse, an online takeaway food order and delivery service pitched in series 5 episode 5 by Tony Charles and Shane Lake, declined investment from Duncan Bannatyne and James Caan after filming opting to accept another investor's offer. The company went on to become a household name in the industry and was later bought for an undisclosed sum before merging with competitor Just Eat in 2017.

Hornit, a bicycle horn reaching a volume of 140 decibels pitched in series 12 episode 10 by Tom De Pelet, was reported to have grossed over £3 million in sales following his appearance. Large increases in cycling in Australia during the COVID-19 pandemic were claimed to be a key factor in the company's growth.

Approved Food, a grocery retailer specialising in heavily discounted, out-of-date products, has reported sales of over 1 million units per year since failing to achieve investment in series 12.

Shayne Bhattesa-Sharma, the youngest entrepreneur to appear on the show as of 2025, has since been backed by billionaire John Caudwell for his board game Football Billionaire. This followed negotiations with Peter Jones breaking down after his appearance in series 20. Shaye has stated that the board game has since accelerated in online sales.

=== Marketing exposure ===
The pitches often see the entrepreneurs subject to significant marketing exposure, resulting in a period of mass customer orders and an influx of interest from various sources. This has occasionally resulted in entrepreneurs reporting difficulties in meeting subsequent supply demands, as well as contributing to claims that half of the deals accepted on-screen are not completed after filming. Amelia Gammon, who appeared in Series 20, Episode 4, accepting Deborah Meaden’s 20% investment in her business, “Bide Planet”, has claimed that, despite receiving investment from other sources following negotiations breaking down after filming, she was overwhelmed with orders following the broadcast. This accelerated production costs at a faster rate than she had anticipated, subsequently leaving the business unable to fulfil orders and facing closure.. Entrepreneurs whose pitches were not broadcast have occasionally voiced their disappointment at missing out on the exposure.

== Criticism ==
=== Sunday Mirror and The Daily Telegraph investigations ===
Investigations conducted in 2006 and 2015 by the Sunday Mirror and The Daily Telegraph newspapers, respectively, criticised the show, reporting that many deals were unfulfilled after filming and alleging that half of the investments made on Dragons' Den fall through. The articles claimed that the Dragons either pulled out of the deals over minor technicalities, deliberately offered unfavourable terms to the entrepreneurs in an effort to make them withdraw, or simply broke off all contact with them after the recording. Tiger Mobiles, a company which unsuccessfully applied to appear on the show in 2008, looked in depth at all 143 businesses that won cash on the show between series 1 and 11, alleging just £5.8m of the £13m pledged was ever invested. Dan Forster, who compiled the research for Tiger Mobiles, claimed that the issue was less about the structure of deals and more about the kind of companies that the BBC invites to take part in the show. "The problem lies with the BBC, who, in a bid to keep the viewer count high, have turned the show into a contrived affair that’s more about viewer entertainment than genuine business success. They tend to pick pitchers who are TV-friendly rather than those who are investible with a healthy balance sheet."

The Dragons have defended their record, blaming the failures on the entrepreneurs themselves and claiming that they were either dishonest or solely appeared on the show for marketing exposure. Duncan Bannatyne said: "We don't hand over money to people who don't tell the truth." Theo Paphitis concurred: "I kept up my end of the bargain. The show is not about a cash prize, it is about us pledging to invest. But people must tell the truth. Simple." When quizzed about the numbers, Deborah Meaden defended her position informing the Telegraph: "I've had entrepreneurs with extremely unfortunate health issues, patent issues, and two or three silences where I never hear from them again." Meaden also added that "The world explodes for businesses after Dragons’ Den, they get offered better deals in some cases, or think they don't need the Dragons. But what they find when the publicity dies down is that they still need help running the business."

A BBC spokesperson responded to the Sunday Mirror in 2006 saying: "After the initial agreement is made on camera, both parties enter a period of due diligence. Sometimes during this period the deals fall through." In 2015, a BBC spokesperson responded to Forster's claims, saying: "We are proud of our record of achieving investment offers in the Den and we look into every detail of a business before they are offered a slot on the show. The BBC plays no role in the deal after recording, and we accept that it is typical for some angel investments to fall down at the due diligence stage."

From Series 1 to 11 the Telegraph's research claimed:

- 76 out of the total 143 agreed investments never went through after the den.
- 23 of the 143 business that successfully pitched are no longer trading.
- Of the £13 million pledged by the Dragons, only £5.8 million was ever invested.
- £250,000 is the highest amount ever successfully pitched for in the den. However, on the two occasions £250,000 was offered, neither investment went through after the show.

=== Clarity of investments and treatment of entrepreneurs ===
The differences between the agreement televised and the deals proposed after filming have caused controversy regarding how entrepreneurs are treated on the show. In 2012, the show faced calls to be cancelled following allegations that many entrepreneurs were being misled to believe their pledge of investment was based on returns from equity when in fact the deals were little different from personal loans.

Founder of the Black Farmer food range Wilfred Emmanuel-Jones, although never appearing in the den himself, has heavily criticised the show, telling The Independent, "How many deals in the Den have succeeded in the long run? Not many. And a lot of the deals the Dragons make will be based on loans or are equity-based, which is the worst kind of finance you can get for a start-up, there are hundreds of people out there you can get advice from – do not go to a Dragon. I know what it's like to build a successful business: hard graft gets you there, not appearing on a TV show. People would be much better off speaking to their bank manager. "He also added "The Dragons are interested only in a good deal that benefits them, and their justification in being that ruthless is because a lot of the deals go wrong. Like everyone, I thought the show was quite novel when it first came out, but Dragons' Den is a programme that has had its time."

The BBC has occasionally received backlash in regards to the editing of the pitches, alleging the show favours information concerning the entrepreneurs' businesses that the dragons find desirable or cite as inaccurate, whilst removing their admissions of misunderstandings and acceptance of the entrepreneurs' strongholds. The BBC received complaints following a pitch from series 2 contestant Stipan Saulich, owner of "Super Knees", a strap for roller skates to ease strain on the knees, where his pitch was shortened to the extent that he did not speak and no feedback displayed as to why the dragons decided not to invest, only featuring a short ridiculing from the dragons following his demonstration of the device. Joe Nelson, who featured in series 11 pitching for investment in his business "TheyFit", accused the BBC of "maliciously" editing his pitch by featuring what he insists were several inaccuracies from the dragons over the product's visage and patent but did not feature the dragons allegedly rescinding these comments following his response. Birmingham entrepreneurs Howard Brown and Alex Black, owners of Real Infra Red Ltd, an underfloor heating business, complained that despite achieving £85,000 investment from Touker Suleyman during filming for series 19, they were not featured in any of the episodes. Brown and Black stated that the BBC informed them prior to the end of the series's broadcast that they would not be featured, however did not explain as to why they favoured pitches featuring the dragons declining investment and ridiculing entrepreneurs. Brown also stated their dismay at the loss of marketing exposure.

==== Acu Seeds controversy ====
The third episode of series 21 saw entrepreneur Giselle Boxer, owner of East Healing Ltd, accept an offer from Steven Bartlett at £50,000 at 12.5% after pitching the company's product "Acu Seeds", acupuncture ear kits. She received acclaim for being the first entrepreneur in the den to receive six offers, following the addition of a guest dragon, whilst Bartlett soon confirmed that the investment was successful after filming and was actively working with Boxer. During the episode, she stated that the product had helped her manage the effects of myalgic encephalomyelitis, however the BBC soon received numerous complaints that the pitch was edited to allegedly imply the product was a cure for the condition. Charities Sheffield ME and Fibromyalgia and Action for M.E both stated that research as of 2024 proves that there is no known permanent remedy for myalgic encephalomyelitis and despite being open to alternative therapies, they lack scientific research to be classed as certified treatment. Action for M.E posted an open letter co-signed by various support groups on 22 January 2024 to the Director General of BBC, asking for support in reviewing the role of the media in promoting unfounded-health claims and their potential harm to society.

The BBC initially defended Boxer's pitch, with a spokesman stating, "Dragons' Den features products from entrepreneurs and is not an endorsement of them. Dragons' Den shows real businesses pitching to investors to lift the lid on what happens in the business world. This episode features an entrepreneur sharing their own, personal, experience that led to a business creation." However, following the backlash from medical professionals, another spokesman confirmed that the episode had been withdrawn from streaming services in order to re-evaluate Boxer's pitch, quoting, "We're taking the concerns raised seriously, so we are reviewing the episode and therefore it's currently not available on iPlayer." Following the review, the episode was re-added to streaming services with a disclaimer pinned to the episode's title description, as well as a text statement accompanying the beginning of Boxer's pitch, stating "Acu Seeds are not intended as a cure for any medical condition and advice should always be sought from a qualified healthcare provider about any health concerns." The Guardian reported that Boxer had not responded to request for comment.

Steven Bartlett's brother Jason stood down as the company's director as of 14 February 2024, indicating that this was in response to the bad publicity the product had received.

==== Talpa Products Ltd allegations ====
The second episode of series 7 saw entrepreneur Sharon Wright, owner of Talpa Products Ltd, accept a joint offer from James Caan and Duncan Bannatyne at £80,000 for 22.5% after pitching the company's product "Magnamole". She has since alleged that Caan and Bannatyne misled her in the den, and that following filming the pledge of £80,000 was in fact a loan and not a purchase of equity. Wright was initially told to meet with series 5 entrepreneurs ElectroExpo, whom Caan and Bannatyne had also invested in together, instead of meeting with the dragons themselves. She was then informed an £80,000 loan would come from them and she would have to pay it back, as opposed to the dragons each giving £40,000 as pledged in the den.

She stated she continued with the process so as not to alarm her existing investors. She was featured in the spin-off series Dragon Den: On Tour where she signed the contract beside Bannatyne, however she later alleged they threatened to withdraw the offer if the contract was not signed and did not have time to get legal representation to review it. Wright said she proceeded as she was then desperate for the money having increased her borrowing to over £26,500 having not seen the full £80,000 pledged, with ElectroExpo only releasing £4,000 to that point. Following the contract being signed she alleged Caan had misled her to believe he would pay for certain services, leading her to receive invoices that she could not afford, and then learnt she would have to pay up to £3,000 for PR services he would then supply. She then appointed a solicitor to review the contract and became aware she had limited access to the £80,000 loan, whilst the dragons had nonetheless purchased the 22.5% equity stake originally agreed upon for just £29. It was also said that at least one of the dragons would become a director, which her solicitor deemed controversial as the equity stake given was generally low. Stating she was now in severe financial difficulty and unable to pay her staff, Wright accused Caan of suggesting she reduce her salary from £50,000 to £12,000 to cope. With Talpa Products now facing financial collapse having subsequently lost part of its supply chain due to the investment's initial lack of clarity, Wright's solicitor terminated the contract and she eventually secured a £100,000 investment from another investor. Despite the product's eventual success, she admitted to suffering a nervous breakdown as a result of the stress endured and was subsequently hospitalised.

Responding to Wright's allegations, Caan stated, "Unfortunately, within a few months of Sharon appearing [on Dragons' Den] she decided that due to the success and positive feedback from the show she would prefer to keep 100% of her company, which Duncan and I fully supported. Occasionally the investment opportunity isn't as it appears on the show. I wish Sharon all the best." Wright filed a lawsuit against Caan, deeming his response derogatory, but was advised to drop proceedings under legal advice. Although defending the involvement of ElectroExpo, Bannatyne implied that he was disgusted by Caan's alleged £3,000 PR fee charge and stated his regret that he did not invest alone with Wright, insisting he would have solely offered money for equity as stated in the den and not offered a loan.

=== Dragon departure controversies ===
Former dragon Simon Woodroffe left the show after participating in the first series, citing his distaste for how he felt the entrepreneurs were treated on the show, quoting, "The show became a battle of egos – not a forum for business innovation", whilst also adding, "The thing to remember was that when you walk up the stairs to pitch, it's not five people necessarily thinking, how am I going to be able to make an investment here? They're also thinking, am I going to be the star of this next little piece? That's not how I was told the show would go down."

Richard Farleigh's departure from the series was met with controversy following the announcement that British-Pakistani businessman James Caan would be his replacement, leading to suggestions that the BBC had not invited him back in favour of having a new dragon from an ethnic minority. Farleigh announced his disappointment at being dropped from the series, stating, "It would be disappointing if that was the reason – rather than anything fundamental – if it was because I was the wrong colour. I don't know why this has happened and I am very disappointed and bemused – I wasn't expecting it because all the feedback I got was very positive. I had even moved back to the UK to focus on commitments for the show. I am gutted that I have not been invited back." A BBC spokeswoman said "Richard will remain very much a part of the Dragons' Den team and will appear in related shows such when we catch up on some of the investments [...] It is a perfectly normal transition for the series. We do not discuss the reasons for the decision but it is all very amicable."

In 2010, Duncan Bannatyne claimed Pakistani-born Caan had an "unfair" business advantage due to his non-domiciled tax status. He complained that because Caan does not pay UK tax on his overseas earnings he has more money to invest in his UK ventures. Caan told the London Evening Standard: "I do not apologise for my country of origin, Pakistan." He also said he could not invest with anyone who had a criminal record – a reference to Bannatyne having served a sentence in military prison when he was a teenager in the Royal Navy. Bannatyne replied that Caan was "playing the race card" and "personalising the whole thing", and accused him of implying he was racist. Only days before the filming of series 8, Bannatyne pointed out on Twitter that Caan is chairman of The Big Issue, which employs sellers with criminal pasts, and asking how they could now work with their chief. He brought the name of the Big Issue founder into the row by asking: 'Did John Bird know about James Caan's view on ex-prisoners when he gave him the chairman's role?' Caan later faced bad press when he was reported to have offered to buy a baby from a family affected by the 2010 Pakistan floods. Caan subsequently decided to leave the show in January 2011. The BBC announced regret and sorrow over the exit and thanked him for his efforts over his four series in the show. Clive Morgan of The Daily Telegraph criticised his departure, stating his exit was the show's loss and it would not be the same without him.

== Special episodes ==
=== Where Are They Now? ===
Where Are They Now? is a companion series to the main programme, often broadcast after each respective series, taking a look back at some of the show's success stories – and biggest failures – and finding out what the participants are up to six months on. The series began with a one-off two part special, broadcast on 21 and 28 December 2005, in which presenter Evan Davis reviewed the programme's success stories from series one and two, and looked at the entrepreneurs who received funds to market their ideas. Cameras followed Charles Ejogo, who planned to put umbrella vending machines in London Underground stations, jewellery designer Elizabeth Galton, magazine publisher Huw Gwyther and Rachel Lowe, whose London-based board game caught their eye. Following this, another one-off two part special was broadcast on 28 September – 8 October 2006. Later, two full series of the show were commissioned, with series one, of four episodes, being broadcast between 18 July and 2 August 2007.

Series two, of five episodes, each following a respective Dragon and their investments, was broadcast between 17 September and 24 October 2010. Peter Jones's episode followed him meeting with Kirsty Henshaw, who made an emotional pitch in the Den when she came in with her frozen dessert business, and was determined to get her product on the supermarket shelves as soon as possible, and also meeting up with condiment king Levi Roots. Duncan Bannatyne's episode followed him as he travelled to the south of France to oversee his daughter's wedding, and then went back to work to follow up on some of his investments. Theo Paphitis's episode followed him as he took 90 employees to Greece for a week of team-building exercises, and also visited two companies he invested in to see how they were getting on. Series five, episode nine also featured at a look back at deals from the series, in a similar vein to Where Are They Now?

=== Outside the Den ===
Outside the Den takes a step back from the world of Dragons' Den, to take a personal look at the Dragons themselves, including personal and intimate interviews, a look behind their business credentials, and taking the cameras into their personal lives. Six episodes of the series have been produced – with the first set of five episodes airing between 27 October and 23 November 2008, and following Theo Paphitis, James Caan, Deborah Meaden, Peter Jones and Duncan Bannatyne in their own respective programmes. A further episode, focusing on new Dragon Hilary Devey, was broadcast over three years later on 29 December 2011.

=== The Best of Dragons' Den ===
The Best of Dragons' Den focuses on presenter Evan Davis taking a look back at the best and worst pitches from the past series of the show, as well as revealing some unseen pitches that were so bad, they didn't make it to broadcast, and talking candidly with the Dragons involved. Two series of the show were produced, the first accompanying series two, with three episodes being broadcast between 19 January and 2 February 2006, and the second accompanying series six, with three episodes being broadcast between 23 February and 9 March 2009.

=== Dragons' Den: On Tour ===
Dragons' Den: On Tour was a series of five episodes which aired between 6 September and 7 October 2009. Each episode follows the Dragons (James Caan, Deborah Meaden, Peter Jones, Theo Paphitis and Duncan Bannatyne) as they travel by bus around the United Kingdom to find out what some of the budding entrepreneurs who had appeared on the show have been up to since, including success stories, awful failures, and some very obvious missed opportunities.

=== Dragons' Den: Online ===
Dragons' Den: Online was a special, online version of the show, which follows the same format as the main show, but is presented by Dominic Byrne, and features Shaf Rasul and Julie Meyer as the Dragons. Instead of being set inside a Den, entrepreneurs pitch to the two Dragons via online video pitches, and subsequent interaction through webcam chat. The highest amount of money on offer is £50,000, which the Dragons can only individually invest in any one business. Episodes were posted weekly, for six weeks from 16 September 2009 to 7 October 2009, and viewers could participate by rating business plans before the two Dragons offered their verdict.

=== Other programmes ===
A number of one-off specials accompanying the broadcast of the main show have also been produced, often as Christmas specials or charity specials. The following eight programmes have been aired thus far:

No. overall	No. in season	Title	Original release date	Prod. code
1	1	"Junior Dragons' Den"	16 November 2007	CIN1
A special junior edition of the show in which youngsters pitch ideas for money exclusively for Children in Need. Investments on offer include a "Look for Loneliness" pack, with stickers, trophies and branded 'friendship' stops, where £5,000 is required, and a selection of guinea pig and hamster houses, where £1,000 is required.
2	2	"The Survival Guide"	25 December 2007	XMAS1
Evan Davis looks to find ten ways that entrepreneurs can impress the Dragons. He also talks to a number of celebrity fans of the show, and also talks to some of the entrepreneurs who have pitched their ideas in the den.
3	3	"Around the World"	25 December 2008	XMAS2
Evan Davis takes a look at the different versions of the show broadcast around the world, including the original Japanese version, the American spin-off American Inventor, starring our very own Peter Jones, and an Australian version.
4	4	"Dragons Give Back"	15 November 2009	CIN2
The Dragons pledge to turn a run-down community centre in a south London estate into a high-tech children's centre of the future for Children in Need. Picking up tools for the first time and getting their hands dirty, can they make a miracle happen with their latest investment?
5	5	"Celebrity Dragons' Den"	16 March 2010	SPR1
A special celebrity edition of the show, exclusively for raising money for sport Sport Relief. Some of the country's best known celebrities pitch their ideas to the Dragons for charity donations – but will any succeed in gaining investment?
6	6	"Come Dine with the Dragons"	16 November 2010	CIN3
The Dragons take part in their own special edition of Come Dine with Me, the winner of which donates £20,000 to each of the charities selected by the dragons. But who will cook the best meal? And who will suffer a culinary disaster?
7	7	"Dragons Den Meets The Apprentice"	17 November 2011	CIN4
Apprentice star Alan Sugar turns up in the Den looking for investment in his latest project. But will any of the Dragons be generous enough to part with their cash? Or does he have a few foul-mouthed words up his sleeve for his potential investors?
8	8	"Christmas Dragons' Den"	23 December 2012	XMAS3
For the first time ever, a number of entrepreneurs arrive in the Den to pitch seasonal ideas, including Christmas decorations, gifts, film experiences and much more. But are the Dragons feeling festive enough to part with their cash for a seasonal business?
9	9	"Top Gear in Dragons' Den"	27 January 2013	TG1
A special skit, featured during the first episode of the 19th series of Top Gear, in which presenter Jeremy Clarkson pitches up in the den looking for investment for his P45, a "car suit" that is designed to be the smallest roadworthy car in the history of motoring. Bannatyne offers Clarkson £1 for 1%.

=== Pitches to Riches ===
Dragons' Den: Pitches to Riches reviews some of the more memorable and successful pitches.

Airdate	Presenter
28 February 2016	Richard Osman
31 December 2016	Richard Osman
30 December 2018	Steph McGovern
24 December 2019	Angela Scanlon

== Departures ==
=== Simon Woodroffe ===
After only one series of the programme, Woodroffe left the panel, citing his displeasure with the show's treatment of the entrepreneurs.

=== Rachel Elnaugh ===
Shortly before the launch of the second series in 2005, Elnaugh's company Red Letter Days went into administration and its remaining assets were bought by fellow dragons Peter Jones and Theo Paphitis. Although Elnaugh was at the helm before and at the time of the company's failure, she blamed the problems on the actions of the previous CEO whom she appointed in 2002, whilst she took a non-executive role to have her fourth child. Following disputes with other Dragons, and the continuing uncomfortable position of the BBC allowing a perceived "failed" businessperson to continue investing on the show, she agreed to leave the Dragons' Den panel.

=== Doug Richard ===
Richard announced his departure from the show in 2005, having failed to make any investments in the second series.

=== Richard Farleigh ===
It was announced on 18 May 2007 that Farleigh had been dropped from the series. Farleigh's replacement was the British-Pakistani businessman James Caan.

=== James Caan ===
On 7 January 2011, the BBC announced James Caan had quit the Dragons' Den panel. He was replaced by Hilary Devey in February 2011.

=== Hilary Devey ===
In June 2012, it was announced that after only two series in the show, Devey would be departing the show to front her own business series for Channel 4. Her final appearance was in the tenth series which aired in late 2012. Devey was replaced by Kelly Hoppen for the 11th series in 2013. Several tributes were paid to Devey following her death in 2022 from the BBC, presenter Evan Davis and fellow dragons.

=== Theo Paphitis ===
On 7 February 2013, Paphitis said that he would be leaving Dragons' Den because of other commitments. Paphitis was replaced by Piers Linney from Series 11 onwards. However, Paphitis returned during Series 17 for four episodes, stepping in for Touker Suleyman whilst he recovered from a short illness, and again during Series 18 for 3 episodes, stepping in for Peter Jones whilst he self-isolated due to the COVID-19 pandemic.

=== Piers Linney ===
Linney announced that he would be departing the show at the end of series twelve, in order to focus on various other projects and dedicate more time to his family. He was replaced by Nick Jenkins from series 13 onwards.

=== Kelly Hoppen ===
On 23 January 2015, Kelly Hoppen announced her departure from the show after two series, stating she was unable to commit to the filming schedule whilst she focused on other commitments. She was replaced by Sarah Willingham from series 13 onwards.

=== Duncan Bannatyne ===
It was announced in July 2014 that, due to "other business commitments", Bannatyne would be departing from the show. His final appearance was in the last episode of series 12, in which he made an investment jointly with Peter Jones in a cash-and-carry business seeking finance for a new sports drink. This left Jones as the only remaining original Dragon. Bannatyne was replaced by Touker Suleyman from series 13 onwards.

=== Sarah Willingham ===
Willingham departed the show on 31 January 2017 after two series, confirming that she had decided to take a year out travelling with her family and was unable to take part in the programme. She was replaced by Jenny Campbell from series 15 onwards.

=== Nick Jenkins ===
Jenkins confirmed he was leaving on 31 January 2017 alongside Sarah Willingham, also after two series, saying "I have thoroughly enjoyed making Dragons' Den but I want to focus more on my portfolio of educational technology businesses and that would make it difficult to take on any more investments from the den." He was replaced by Tej Lalvani from series 15 onwards.

=== Jenny Campbell ===
Campbell left Dragons' Den with her last episode airing on 3 February 2019. She put her leaving down to a need to focus on her new role at the Prince's Trust Enterprise Fellowship Programme, as well as helping her sons Rik and Tom develop as entrepreneurs. She was replaced in series 17 by Sara Davies.

=== Tej Lalvani ===
In January 2021, it was announced that Lalvani would be leaving the show after four years, to focus on the expansion and development of his business Vitabiotics. He left at the end of Series 18. In May 2021, it was announced that from Series 19 Lalvani was to be replaced by entrepreneur Steven Bartlett, who at the time, was the youngest dragon in the den's history.

=== Sara Davies ===
On 6 March 2025, Sara Davies announced she would be stepping away from filming Dragons’ Den “for now” to focus on her own business, marking the 22nd series as her last one.

=== Touker Suleyman ===
On 7 June 2026, Touker Suleyman announced he would be leaving the show at the end of Series 23 after 11 years, stating that he felt it was time for 'new blood' in the den. He later clarified that he was solely 'retiring from the show,' with his focus now solely on his business ventures and continuing to mentor the entrepreneurs he completed deals with in the den.

== Ratings ==
Episode ratings from BARB.

=== Series 1 ===
Episode no.	Airdate	Viewers (millions)	BBC Two weekly ranking
1	4 January 2005	—N/a	—N/a
2	11 January 2005	—N/a	—N/a
3	18 January 2005	—N/a	—N/a
4	25 January 2005	—N/a	—N/a
5	1 February 2005	—N/a	—N/a
6	8 February 2005	—N/a	—N/a

=== Series 2 ===
Episode no.	Airdate	Viewers (millions)	BBC Two weekly ranking
1	15 November 2005	2.22	23
2	22 November 2005	2.33	19
3	29 November 2005	2.29	18
4	6 December 2005	2.46	16
5	13 December 2005	2.41	17
6	20 December 2005	2.79	10

=== Series 3 ===
Episode no.	Airdate	Viewers (millions)	BBC Two weekly ranking
1	3 August 2006	2.52	1
2	10 August 2006	2.48	4
3	17 August 2006	2.88	1
4	24 August 2006	3.03	1
5	31 August 2006	3.03	1
6	7 September 2006	3.35	1
7	14 September 2006	3.38	2
8	21 September 2006	3.90	1

=== Series 4 ===
Episode no.	Airdate	Viewers (millions)	BBC Two weekly ranking
1	7 February 2007	3.38	3
2	14 February 2007	3.16	9
3	21 February 2007	3.69	2
4	28 February 2007	3.42	4
5	7 March 2007	3.53	4
6	21 March 2007	3.56	1

=== Series 5 ===
Episode no.	Airdate	Viewers (millions)	BBC Two weekly ranking
1	15 October 2007	3.22	1
2	22 October 2007	2.89	6
3	29 October 2007	3.29	3
4	5 November 2007	3.56	5
5	19 November 2007	3.31	3
6	26 November 2007	2.66	9
7	3 December 2007	3.14	4
8	10 December 2007	3.58	1
9	18 December 2007	3.42	4
10	25 December 2007	2.14	24

=== Series 6 ===
Episode no.	Airdate	Viewers (millions)	BBC Two weekly ranking
1	21 July 2008	3.85	2
2	28 July 2008	3.29	1
3	4 August 2008	3.74	1
4	11 August 2008	3.73	1
5	18 August 2008	3.84	2
6	25 August 2008	3.62	1
7	1 September 2008	3.95	1
8	8 September 2008	3.89	1

=== Series 7 ===
Episode no.	Airdate	Viewers (millions)	BBC Two weekly ranking
1	15 July 2009	3.18	3
2	23 July 2009	3.34	4
3	29 July 2009	3.36	3
4	5 August 2009	3.37	3
5	12 August 2009	2.93	5
6	19 August 2009	3.49	2
7	26 August 2009	4.24	1
8	2 September 2009	4.04	1

=== Series 8 ===
Episode no.	Airdate	Viewers (millions)	BBC Two weekly ranking
1	14 July 2010	3.25	2
2	21 July 2010	3.27	3
3	26 July 2010	3.02	4
4	2 August 2010	3.17	3
5	9 August 2010	3.17	1
6	16 August 2010	3.11	2
7	24 August 2010	3.17	1
8	31 August 2010	2.98	3
9	6 September 2010	3.13	1
10	13 September 2010	2.82	2

=== Series 9 ===
Episode no.	Airdate	Viewers (millions)	BBC Two weekly ranking
1	31 July 2011	4.39	2
2	7 August 2011	4.19	1
3	14 August 2011	3.27	1
4	21 August 2011	3.72	1
5	28 August 2011	3.20	4
6	4 September 2011	3.08	3
7	12 September 2011	2.26	6
8	19 September 2011	2.17	6
9	26 September 2011	2.46	7
10	3 October 2011	2.45	5

=== Series 10 ===
Episode no.	Airdate	Viewers (millions)	BBC Two weekly ranking
1	9 September 2012	2.17	5
2	16 September 2012	1.91	9
3	23 September 2012	2.05	9
4	30 September 2012	1.66	14
5	7 October 2012	1.96	10
6	14 October 2012	1.91	12
7	21 October 2012	2.19	8
8	28 October 2012	2.00	12
9	11 November 2012	1.63	30
10	18 November 2012	—N/a	—N/a
11	25 November 2012	1.65	27
12	2 December 2012	1.91	16
Christmas Special	27 December 2012	—N/a	—N/a

=== Series 11 ===
Episode no.	Airdate	Viewers (millions)	BBC Two weekly ranking
1	11 August 2013	3.37	1
2	18 August 2013	3.36	1
3	25 August 2013	2.65	2
4	1 September 2013	2.18	6
5	8 September 2013	2.47	4
6	15 September 2013	2.58	6
7	26 January 2014	2.79	3
8	2 February 2014	3.13	2
9	9 February 2014	3.12	2
10	16 February 2014	3.00	5
11	23 February 2014	3.15	5
12	2 March 2014	3.26	3

=== Series 12 ===
Episode no.	Airdate	Viewers (millions)	BBC Two weekly ranking
1	20 July 2014	2.63	3
2	27 July 2014	2.47	4
3	3 August 2014	2.59	5
4	10 August 2014	2.52	3
5	17 August 2014	2.91	2
6	24 August 2014	2.36	3
7	25 January 2015	2.88	4
8	1 February 2015	2.80	4
9	8 February 2015	2.83	5
10	15 February 2015	2.87	5
11	22 February 2015	3.10	3
12	15 March 2015	2.45	6

=== Series 13 ===
Episode no.	Airdate	Viewers (millions)	BBC Two weekly ranking
1	12 July 2015	—N/a	—N/a
2	19 July 2015	—N/a	—N/a
3	26 July 2015	2.84	2
4	2 August 2015	3.47	1
5	9 August 2015	3.61	1
6	16 August 2015	3.16	1
7	23 August 2015	3.23	1
8	30 August 2015	2.55	4
9	6 September 2015	2.39	6
10	27 December 2015	2.42	9
11	3 January 2016	2.91	2
12	10 January 2016	2.94	3
13	24 January 2016	2.60	5
14	31 January 2016	2.68	6
15	21 February 2016	2.53	3

=== Series 14 ===
Episode no.	Airdate	Viewers (millions)	BBC Two weekly ranking
1	24 July 2016	3.37	1
2	31 July 2016	3.06	1
3	7 August 2016	2.77	4
4	14 August 2016	2.34	13
5	21 August 2016	3.43	3
6	28 August 2016	2.82	4
7	4 September 2016	2.67	5
8	28 December 2016	2.04	16
9	1 January 2017	2.31	12
10	8 January 2017	2.79	3
11	15 January 2017	2.89	2
12	29 January 2017	2.68	2
13	5 February 2017	2.63	2
14	12 February 2017	2.72	2
15	19 February 2017	2.64	2
16	26 February 2017	2.79	1

=== Series 15 ===
Episode no.	Airdate	Viewers (millions)	BBC Two weekly ranking
1	20 August 2017	2.82	1
2	27 August 2017	2.29	2
3	3 September 2017	2.77	1
4	10 September 2017	2.46	1
5	24 September 2017	2.44	2
6	1 October 2017	2.64	2
7	8 October 2017	2.39	4
8	15 October 2017	2.39	4
9	26 December 2017	2.12	3
10	14 January 2018	2.16	10
11	28 January 2018	2.41	4
12	4 February 2018	2.38	4
13	11 February 2018	2.83	2
14	18 February 2018	2.80	3

=== Series 16 ===
Episode no.	Airdate	Viewers (millions)	BBC Two weekly ranking
1	12 August 2018	2.92	1
2	19 August 2018	3.16	1
3	26 August 2018	3.32	1
4	2 September 2018	3.04	1
5	9 September 2018	3.08	1
6	16 September 2018	3.10	2
7	4 November 2018	2.12	4
8	11 November 2018	2.57	5
9	25 November 2018	2.34	6
10	2 December 2018	2.17	7
11	23 December 2018	2.29	8
12	6 January 2019	2.43	7
13	13 January 2019	2.86	1
14	27 January 2019	2.58	3
15	3 February 2019	2.68	2

=== Series 17 ===
Episode no.	Airdate	Viewers (millions)	BBC Two weekly ranking
1	11 August 2019	3.07	1
2	18 August 2019	2.84	2
3	25 August 2019	2.34	3
4	1 September 2019	2.53	1
5	8 September 2019	2.82	1
6	15 September 2019	2.70	1
7	22 September 2019	2.79	1
8	22 December 2019	2.26	8
9	8 March 2020	2.26	6
10	15 March 2020	2.56	4
11	22 March 2020	3.06	3
12	29 March 2020	3.08	4
13	5 April 2020	2.88	4
14	12 April 2020	2.68	5

=== Series 18 ===
Episode no.	Airdate	Viewers (millions)	BBC One weekly ranking
1	1 April 2021	3.51	21
2	8 April 2021	3.56	20
3	15 April 2021	3.33	28
4	22 April 2021	3.59	22
5	29 April 2021	3.34	24
6	6 May 2021	3.43	23
7	13 May 2021	3.28	30
8	20 May 2021	3.33	24
9	27 May 2021	<(3.02)	<24
10	3 June 2021	3.09	19
11	10 June 2021	3.37	26
12	24 June 2021	3.31	18
13	1 July 2021	3.37	19
14	8 July 2021	3.40	14

=== Series 19 ===
Episode no.	Airdate	Viewers (millions)	BBC One weekly ranking
1	6 January 2022	4.21	16
2	13 January 2022	3.95	21
3	20 January 2022	4.05	15
4	27 January 2022	4.18	16
5	3 February 2022	3.94	19
6	10 February 2022	3.76	14
7	17 February 2022	3.78	18
8	24 February 2022	3.92	15
9	3 March 2022	4.15	13
10	10 March 2022	3.85	11
11	17 March 2022	3.65	14
12	24 March 2022	3.62	13
13	31 March 2022	3.49	13
14	7 April 2022	3.40	17

=== Series 20 ===
Episode no.	Airdate	Viewers (millions)	BBC One weekly ranking
1	5 January 2023	4.29	13
2	12 January 2023	4.00	16
3	19 January 2023	3.89	14
4	26 January 2023	4.24	10
5	2 February 2023	4.16	11
6	9 February 2023	3.97	12
7	16 February 2023	3.82	13
8	23 February 2023	3.78	14
9	2 March 2023	3.74	11
10	9 March 2023	3.86	12
11	16 March 2023	3.79	8
12	23 March 2023	3.36	19
13	30 March 2023	3.30	19
14	6 April 2023	2.92	17

=== Series 21 ===
Episode no.	Airdate	Viewers (millions)	BBC One weekly ranking
1	4 January 2024	3.55	19
2	11 January 2024	3.63	22
3	18 January 2024	3.99	13
4	25 January 2024	4.13	10
5	2 February 2024	4.02	10
6	8 February 2024	4.19	10
7	15 February 2024	4.14	8
8	22 February 2024	4.14	9
9	29 February 2024	4.04	8
10	7 March 2024	3.92	6
11	14 March 2024	3.82	10
12	21 March 2024	3.70	9
13	28 March 2024	3.95	6
14	4 April 2024	3.68	17

=== Series 22 ===
Episode no.	Airdate	Viewers (millions)	BBC One weekly ranking
1	9 January 2025		
2	16 January 2025		
3	23 January 2025		
4	30 January 2025		
5	6 February 2025		
6	13 February 2025		
7	20 February 2025		
8	27 February 2025		
9	31 July 2025		
10	2 October 2025		
11	9 October 2025		
12	16 October 2025		
13	23 October 2025		
14	30 October 2025		

=== Series 23 ===
Episode no.	Airdate	Viewers (millions)	BBC One weekly ranking
1	29 January 2026		
2	5 February 2026		
3	12 February 2026		
4	19 February 2026		
5	26 February 2026		
6	5 March 2026		
7	12 March 2026		
8	20 August 2026		
9	27 August 2026		
10	3 September 2026		
11	10 September 2026		
12	17 September 2026		
13	24 September 2026		
14	25 September 2026		
