= Jenna Meek =

British entrepreneur (born 1992)

- Born: 1992 (age 33–34); Bishop Auckland, England
- Education: Manchester Metropolitan University
- Occupation: Entrepreneur
- Years active: 2003–present
- Television: Dragons' Den

Jenna Meek (born 1992) is an English entrepreneur. She founded The Gypsy Shrine in 2016, which she subsequently renamed to Shrine and sold in 2024, and Refy in 2020, which she cofounded with Jess Hunt. She also appeared as a guest dragon on Dragon's Den in 2026.

== Life and career ==
Meek was born in Bishop Auckland, England, and attended that town's St John's Catholic School. In summer 2003, she and a friend organised a charity drive for Operation Christmas Child which raised more than 40 shoe boxes full of writing equipment and other gifts. She was inspired to become an entrepreneur by the UK business shows The Apprentice and Dragons' Den and read international fashion marketing at Manchester Metropolitan University. Aged 19, she interned at Hugo Boss in New York before working for Christopher Raeburn and Emilia Wickstead. A move to Burberry in 2015 extinguished her interest in fashion and she set up a year later Shrine, then known as The Gypsy Shrine. Meek started the firm by individually applying biodegradable glitter paint and jewels to festivalgoers' faces and bodies and later hired Sophie Tea to help out.

Meek went viral after taking photos of her friends topless with their chests covered in glitter and appeared on Love Island in 2017 to decorate that year's contestants. Shrine subsequently diversified into an all-in-one face jewels kit sold through listings on the websites PrettyLittleThing and ASOS, as a concessionaire in Topshop, and at its flagship store in Carnaby Street. In the face of competition, and her concern about the environmental impact of the jewels, Meek stopped making them and transitioned to selling temporary hair dyes.

Meek cofounded Refy in 2020 with influencer Jess Hunt after meeting her at a photoshoot and being horrified by the length of her eyebrow routine. The firm launched in November that year with an eyebrow gel and later launched various lines of makeup, bodycare, fashion, clothing, and skincare. She then married her long-term boyfriend in July 2021, appeared in Forbes 30 Under 30 in 2022, sold Shrine in 2024, and appeared with Hunt on The Sunday Times's 2025 beauty rich list. Following the departure of fellow St John's alumna Sara Davies from Dragons' Den, Meek, Susie Ma, and two men appeared as guest dragons on that series of Dragons' Den, Meek first. She promoted her first appearance by appearing on The One Show and subsequently constituted part of the show's first majority-female panel.

== Filmography ==
- Love Island (2017, one episode)
- Dragons' Den (2026-present, six episodes)
