= Jim Eastwood =

Northern Irish businessman

Charles James Eastwood (born 1978) is a British businessman from Cookstown, Northern Ireland, who was one of the final four contestants in the seventh series of the BBC reality TV series The Apprentice. He was born in Cookstown and is a graduate of the University of Ulster and the University of North Carolina. During his time on The Apprentice, he gained the nickname "Jedi Jim" due to his persuasive abilities and use of mind games. Eastwood is also a former all-Ireland cycling champion.

== The Apprentice ==
In 2011, Eastwood appeared on the seventh series of The Apprentice. He started out well, shining individually despite being on the losing team for three of the first four tasks. He came to prominence on the show after persuading his team leader Leon Doyle to select a different person to bring back into the boardroom after he had already decided Jim would be one of the two candidates. Eastwood then drifted for the next few tasks, only just avoiding being fired in week 5 after a poor product naming decision. From then on, he was branded "evil" and was branded by Lord Sugar's aide at the time Nick Hewer as "spooky" because of his apparent decision to use his abilities of persuasion more aggressively, having another narrow escape in week 7 as project manager, when his mistake in negotiation over advertising space in the Hip Replacement magazine cost the team victory.

However, Eastwood had a return to form in week 9, when he not only designed a well-received luxury biscuit called Special Stars, but also helped secure the biggest victory ever seen in the UK version of The Apprentice, by delivering a pitch to Asda that persuaded them to place an order of 800,000 units. Eastwood once again shone in the reinvestment task with huge sales of umbrellas, although his performance, and that of Susan Ma, was overshadowed by the bizarre decisions of his project manager Natasha Scribbins, who failed to understand the point of the task and refused to reinvest on the second day in any substantial quantity. Eastwood reached the final despite a second disastrous loss as project manager, in which Venture's concept for a Mexican restaurant lost in every single category to Logic, made worse by the failure to produce any financial plan for the pitch. Jim's survival was mostly a result of Natasha taking a total backseat on the task, despite possessing a degree in hospitality, but he was nonetheless tipped for victory by previous candidates. Though he was dubbed "The World's Greatest Salesman" by Lord Sugar, he failed to win as the interviewers considered his business plan an attempt to ingratiate himself with Lord Sugar.

== After The Apprentice ==
After The Apprentice, Eastwood set up his own business as a public speaker. His nickname has also been featured on a t-shirt, one of which was given by Eastwood to host Dara Ó Briain on The Apprentice: You're Fired!.

He was hired as the Regional Vice President of Groupon Ltd for the UK and Ireland in November 2011. Since March 2017, he serves as the Global Sales Director for Travel Counsellors Ltd.
