= Tropic Skincare =

British skincare company

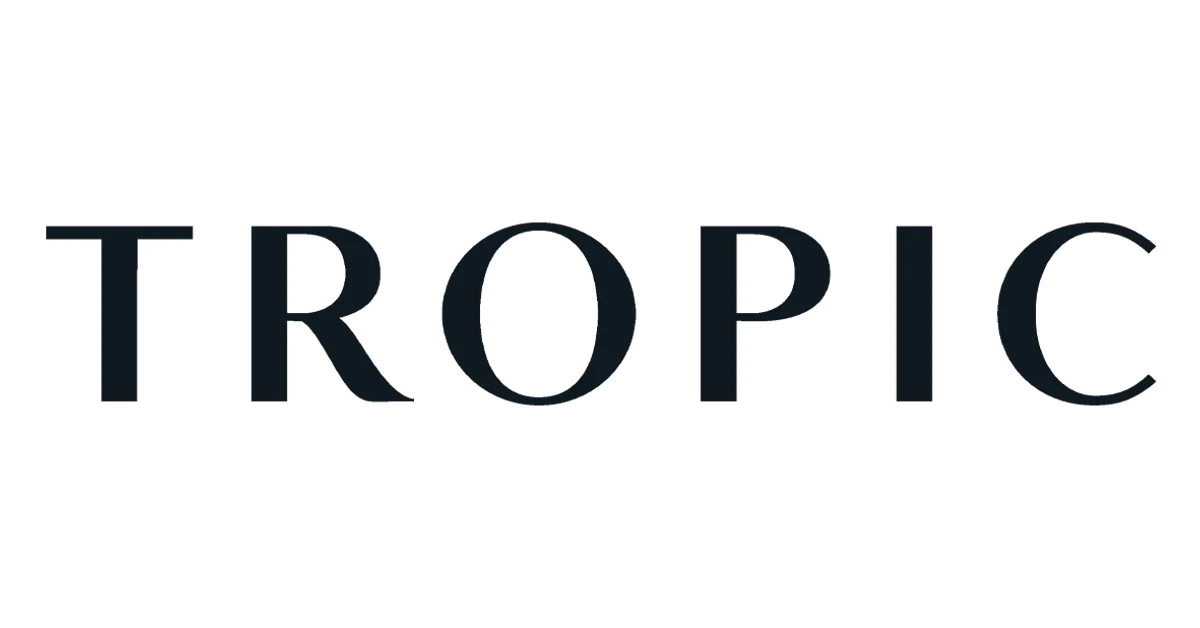
- Type: Limited company
- Founded: 2011 in London, England
- Founder: Susie Ma
- Headquarters: Croydon, London, England
- Area served: United Kingdom
- Key people: Susie Ma (Founder, CEO)
- Products: Skin care, cosmetics, makeup
- Net income: £97.4 million (2020)
- Number of employees: 316
- Website: tropicskincare.com

Tropic Skincare is a British online and multi-level marketing company which sells skincare and cosmetic products. The company is based in Croydon, South London. The business is owned by The Apprentice series 7 contestant Susie Ma.

== History ==
Tropic initially launched as Tropic Pure Plant Skin Care in 2007. The company officially became incorporated in 2011. After Ma took part in the seventh series of The Apprentice, Alan Sugar invested to become a 50% stakeholder in Tropic. In 2013, Tropic launched its direct-selling model with 400 founding sales people, known as ambassadors. Since April 2023, Ma now owns 100% of the business.
