= Suki Sandhu =

British entrepreneur and author

Suki Sandhu OBE
- Known for: Diversity, equity and inclusion in business.

Suki Sandhu OBE is a gay British Asian entrepreneur and author. He is an advocate for diversity, equity and inclusion (DEI) in the British business sector and a participant in LGBT+ community initiatives. He is the founder and CEO of Audeliss Executive Search and INvolve. His companies were featured in The Sunday Times list of Britain's 100 fastest growing private companies.

== Background, education and early career ==
Sandhu grew up in a Sikh family in Derby, UK and is the middle child of immigrant parents, with an older brother and a younger sister. His parents moved from India and ran a grocery store where the children often helped out.

He read economics at Birmingham University before becoming a graduate trainee at Michael Page. He became one of Michael Page's top performers and after three and a half years left to join Green Park, an executive search firm, as a partner. He launched Audeliss Executive Search in 2011 from his spare bedroom in Whitechapel, east London.

== Diversity, equity and inclusion ==
=== 2013 ===
He founded the Outstanding LGBT+ Role Model Lists published in The Financial Times featuring LGBTQ+ senior executives, future leaders and their advocates in 2013.

=== 2014 ===
He founded the Empower Ethnic Minority Role Model Lists published in The Financial Times featuring ethnically diverse senior executives, future leaders and their advocates. (paywall)

=== 2017 ===
He founded the Heroes Women Role Model Lists published in The Financial Times featuring women senior executives, future leaders and their advocates.

=== 2019 ===
He was awarded an OBE for services to diversity in business in 2019.

=== 2020 ===
Sandhu founded the campaign If Not Now, When? calling for a step-change on Black inclusion in business, the workplace and society. Arising from the Black Lives Matter Movement, This campaign involved Sandhu calling on the British business community to address representation for ethnic minorities. He co-ordinated an open letter that was signed by 25 business leaders, including bosses from Tesco, John Lewis and ITV, and criticised companies for failing to increase racial diversity in the workforce.

=== 2022 ===
He was a co-author of the book How To Get Your Act Together: a Judgement Free Guide to Diversity and Inclusion for Straight White Men which has been endorsed by business leaders including Sir Richard Branson and Marc Benioff, of Salesforce.

=== 2023 ===
He founded the Enable Role Model List, which identifies individuals working on disability, neurodiversity, and mental health inclusion in business.

=== 2024 ===
In June 2024, INvolve announced it was acquiring the BBBAwards (celebrating Black British business leaders) and TNON (a network transforming corporate cultures for minority professionals).

== Voluntary and philanthropy ==
Sandhu founded The Suki Sandhu LGBTQI Asia Fund to support organisations in Asia and the Far East campaigning for recognition and to raise awareness of LGBTQI communities, who face extreme discrimination in some countries.

He is a board director of OutRight Action International, an LGBT human rights organisation and a Stonewall Ambassador.

Sandhu is a patron of The Albert Kennedy Trust alongside prominent figures like Sir Ian McKellen and Russell Tovey which supports LGBTQ+ young people facing or experiencing homelessness.

He was an advisor to the UK government-sponsored, business-led diversity campaign organisation Leaders As Change Agents.

He is an advisory board member of the personal development programme BecomingX, founded by adventurer Bear Grylls OBE.

He is an ambassador for the organisation 25 x 25 which engages CEOs and Chairs about hiring more women into C-suite and CEO positions.

== Personal life ==
He lives in Jersey and is married to Manuel Heichlinger.
