= Scents of Time =

Perfume company

- Company type: Private company
- Industry: Cosmetics
- Founded: 2007
- Founder: David Pybus
- Defunct: 2012
- Fate: Closed down
- Headquarters: Crewe, Cheshire, United Kingdom
- Area served: International
- Products: Perfumes
- Website: scentsoftime.co.uk^{[Archived 26 March 2012]}

Scents of Time was a British perfume company which specialized in re-creating ancient fragrances. The company was founded by perfumer David Pybus and based in the United Kingdom. The company was featured in Series 4, Episode 5 of the BBC entrepreneur opportunity programme Dragons' Den on 7 March 2007. Their products were distributed at the British Museum and through online retailers.

The recreated scents differed from the original formulae in two fundamental ways. All ingredients conformed to the current safety standards for the perfume industry as some old formulations contained components now determined to have toxicity. The second difference was the use of alcohol as a carrier rather than the olive or almond oil common in ancient times. The company produced five scents and had two under development.

The company suspended its internet sales in January 2012 and closed down at the end of April 2012, after donating all remaining stock to charitable organizations. It cited a weak worldwide economy and marketing competition from celebrity-endorsed fragrances.
