= Pocket Money Pitch =

British children's television series

- Genre: Children's reality
- Based on: Dragons' Den
- Presented by: Steph McGovern
- Country of origin: United Kingdom
- Original language: English
- No. of seasons: 1
- No. of episodes: 10

Production
- Production location: Dock10 studios
- Running time: 30 minutes

Original release
- Network: CBBC
- Release: 8 February – 11 April 2016

Pocket Money Pitch is a short-lived British CBBC children's reality television series, which premiered on 8 February 2016 on a weekly basis. The series, consisting of ten episodes, aired every Monday.

== Format ==
Pocket Money Pitch focuses on various celebrity entrepreneurs viewing children's business ideas, in which the winner receives a year's worth of pocket money (£322.40). The show's television format is loosely based upon Dragon's Den.

== Episodes ==
No.	Project	Guru	Original air date	Business Buddies	Winner
Ep. 1	Food	Levi Roots	8 February 2016	Bianca Miller, Suleman Sacranie, Luke Thomas	Kool Cookies
Ep. 2	Fashion accessories	Myleene Klass	15 February 2016	Luke Thomas, Amber Atherton, Emma-Jayne Parkes	The Sewing Cycle
Ep. 3	Inventions	Rob Law	22 February 2016	Emily Brooke, Bianca Miller, Emma-Jayne Parkes	C-Klik
Ep. 4	Social Media	Jamal Edwards	29 February 2016	Ben Towers, Suleman Sacranie, Emma-Jayne Parkes	Kiductions Joe Bloodworth & Phoebe Daltrey
Ep. 5	Toys and Games	Michael Acton Smith	7 March 2016	Ben Towers, Emma-Jayne Parkes, Emily Brooke	Denventure
Ep. 6	Retail	Hussein Lalani	14 March 2016	Luke Thomas, Bianca Miller, Amber Atherton	Gorgeous on Earth
Ep. 7	Online	Sarah Jane Thomson	21 March 2016	Ben Towers, Amber Atherton, Suleman Sacranie	Coding Kids
Ep. 8	Animal Innovations	Claire Gavin	28 March 2016	Emma-Jayne Parkes, Bianca Miller, Luke Thomas	Laura's Pet Pressies
Ep. 9	Sport and Adventure	John Graham	4 April 2016	Ben Towers, Amber Atherton, Emily Brooke	Babaton
Ep. 10	What Happened Next	All gurus	11 April 2016	Ben Towers, Amber Atherton, Emily Brooke, Bianca Miller, Luke Thomas, Emma-Jayne Parkes, Suleman Sacranie	N/A

== Production ==
The show was presented by BBC Breakfast Business presenter Steph McGovern. Levi Roots, Myleene Klass, Jamal Edwards and Ben Towers are included as three of the other various entrepreneurs.

== Broadcast ==
The show was first broadcast on the CBBC on 8 February 2016 at 5.30pm, with episodes 8 onwards airing at 5:30pm.

== Kiductions.com ==
Joe Bloodworth and Phoebe Daltrey started kiductions.com through Pocket Money Pitch. They impressed the guru Jamal Edwards and won the years worth of pocket money. The website ran for a couple of years, was set to reopen in 2018 but there has been no activity since 2017.

Phoebe Daltrey later went on to star in CBBC's Top This as a presenter of the show.
