= Approved Food =

British discount food retailer

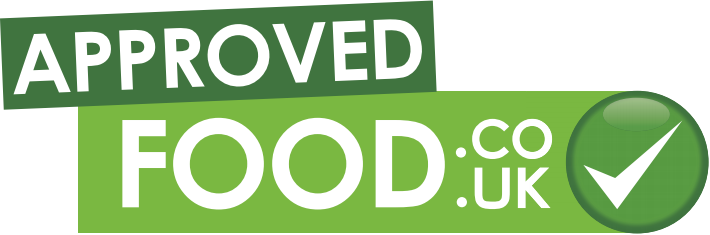
- Type: Private Limited with Share Capital
- Traded as: Approved Food Limited
- Industry: Internet Retail, Food
- Founded: 2009
- Founder: Dan Cluderay
- Headquarters: Dodworth, South Yorkshire, United Kingdom 53.382000°N 1.431802°W
- Area Served: South East England, Midlands, North West England, Yorkshire, South West England, Wales, Ireland, Scotland, North East England, United Kingdom, Germany, France, Monaco, Belgium, Luxembourg, the Netherlands, Austria, Denmark, Spain, Italy, Slovakia and Czech Republic, Estonia, Finland, Hungary, Poland, Portugal, Sweden, Slovenia, Bulgaria, Greece, Latvia, Lithuania, Romania
- Key People: Dan Cluderay, founder. Andy Needham, Director. Jonathan Straight, brand ambassador.
- Services: Groceries, Consumer Goods
- Revenue: £4 million (2015)
- Website: www.approvedfood.co.uk

Approved Food is an online discount food retailer based in Dodworth, South Yorkshire, in the United Kingdom. The company retails products that are near or past their best before date or products that are considered difficult to sell by other retailers. It is the UK's largest online retailer for short dated and residual stock. As well as food and drink, Approved Food sells a range of household goods, beauty products, pet supplies and alcohol.

== History ==
Approved Food was established in 2009 by former Ericssonshift support technician Dan Cluderay who created the online retailer after a number of years selling food on market stalls in Hull and Doncaster. In September 2014 the business moved to its current 60,000-square-foot (5,600 m^{2}) Sheffield Parkway warehouse where it employs more than 50 members of staff.

In 2015 Approved Food appeared on the BBC’s Dragons' Den, where Cluderay and his business partner Andy Needham pitched to the dragons for a £150,000 investment in return for with a 10% stake in the company. Approved Food were also shortlisted in Virgin Media’s Pitch to Rich competition in a bid to win a share of the £400,000 prize fund. The competition saw the company campaign for public votes, before delivering a pitch to a panel of judges that included Richard Branson. Approved Food was runner-up, winning a £100,000 marketing campaign from Virgin Media. In March 2015 Approved Food also featured on ITV’s Bargain Fever Britain documentary about value retailers in the UK alongside Costco, Motorpoint & Shoezone.

In 2019, Approved Food began campaigning for better education around 'best before' dates, believing that a lack of understanding by the general public was leading to food being thrown away unnecessarily. In May, Andy Needham and Jonathan Straight attended the DEFRA 'Step up to the Plate' event, pledging to commit action to ending food waste.

== Operations ==
Approved Food retails solely online, operating from the fulfilment centre in Dodworth having moved from Sheffield in 2019. The company’s software systems have been fully written and developed in house.
