= YourCash Europe Ltd =

Automated teller machine provider

YourCash Europe Ltd is an automated teller machine (ATM) provider with operations in the UK, Netherlands, Belgium and Ireland. The company is owned by Euronet Worldwide. and is headquartered in Milton Keynes, UK.

YourCash machines are merchant-replenished ATMs, allowing businesses to fill the cash machines using cash takings from their own cash stocks and then be reimbursed electronically by YourCash.

== History ==
YourCash was established in 2000, as a private limited company under the name Hanco ATM Systems. It supplied machines in convenience locations such as grocers, corner shops, and garden centres.

In 2003, it opened operations in the Netherlands. In 2004, the Royal Bank of Scotland Group acquired Hanco ATM systems and by 2006 had begun rolling out free-to-use ATMs in the UK.

In October 2010, the business underwent a management buyout process that saw ownership divest from RBS and become a standalone private limited company - YourCash Limited. During this time, YourCash also began expansion into Belgium which was completed in 2011.

In 2013, managing director Jenny Campbell led a secondary buy-out to enable the senior management team to take control of YourCash. This meant YourCash was now trading as a fully independent business with Campbell as the majority shareholder and CEO.

Further expansion into Ireland took place in 2016.

According to company officials, YourCash now controls 32 percent of the free-to-use ATM market in the UK.

In October 2016, YourCash was acquired by Euronet Worldwide, with Campbell remaining as chief executive.

== LINK network ==
YourCash is one of the 36 member institutions that comprise the LINK network. This is a shared interbank network of ATM providers operating in the UK and includes banks, building societies, and independent ATM operators.
