= Outsourcery =

Former cloud services provider

Outsourcery Plc
- Type: Public Limited Company (in administration)
- Industry: Cloud computing, unified communications, telecommunications
- Headquarters: Manchester
- Key people: Piers Linney, Ken Olisa and Simon Newton
- Products: Unified Communications, Skype for Business, Microsoft Lync, Infrastructure as a Service, Microsoft Exchange Server, hosted video conferencing, connectivity, professional services and Microsoft Office 365
- Website: Outsourcery.co.uk

Outsourcery Plc, was a UK-based cloud services provider founded in 2007 by co-CEOs, Piers Linney and Simon Newton. They provided services primarily to small-and-medium-sized enterprises (SMEs). The company went into administration in June 2016 when most of the business and assets were acquired by GCI Network Solutions Ltd.

== History ==
Outsourcery's origins date from 1997 when the business initially provided mobile solutions to UK organisations. In 2007, Piers Linney and Simon Newton acquired the business and assets of Genesis Communications – an established business-to-business mobile voice and data reseller. In the same year, Genesis acquired an early stage Microsoft application hosting company, Servelogic Limited, enabling it to enter the hosted services market. Between 2007 and 2010, the company saw revenue for cloud-based services grow from zero to over £4 million and the legacy business was subsequently sold through two transactions during 2011 for a total of £15 million.

Along with Linney and Newton, Outsourcery's Board was led by Ken Olisa OBE (non-executive chairman), Andrew Burton (non-executive director) and Jane Hall (non-executive director).

On 24 May 2013, Outsourcery was admitted to London's Alternative Investment Market (AIM). The sale of the legacy mobile distribution business was completed on 3 September 2013.

On 6 November 2013, Outsourcery announced that it had partnered with Dell to design and deploy a secure cloud-based system. The announcement followed Outsourcery's agreement with Microsoft to lead its UK initiative to accelerate the offering of cloud services for the UK public sector, in particular central government.

Outsourcery suspended trading of its stock on AIM, on 3 June 2016, due to its inability to present audited financial results for the year ended 31 December 2015. It stated that "the potential proceeds from the current proposals would potentially leave no or limited value to equity shareholders". Later that month Ernst & Young were appointed as administrators and most of the business and assets were sold to GCI Network Solutions Ltd.

== Organisation and activities ==
Outsourcery was a member of the Microsoft Cloud OS Network. It was also a founder member of the Cloud Industry Forum (CIF).

Outsourcery's O-Cloud platform was certified to run government classified information at OFFICIAL and OFFICIAL SENSITIVE over the internet. This gave Outsourcery CESG Pan Government Accreditation (PGA) (formerly IL2) and Public Services Network (PSN) Protect (formerly IL3) connectivity to meet data sovereignty and security specifications for the public sector and UK government.

Outsourcery's former co-CEO, Piers Linney, became better known as a 'Dragon' on series 11 and 12 of the BBC Two television programme, Dragons' Den.

== Awards and accreditations ==
- Outsourcery was ISO 27001 (Information Security), ISO 9001 (Quality Management) and ISO 14001 (Environmental Management) accredited. As a founder member, Outsourcery had also achieved Cloud Industry Forum (CIF) certification.
- Outsourcery achieved CESG Pan Government Accreditation in 2014
- Comms Business: Green Channel Company Award – Winner (2010)
- Microsoft Hosting Solutions Partner of the Year Award – Winner (2010)
- Comms Business: Reseller of the Year Award – Winner (2011)
- Microsoft Dynamics CRM Partner of the Year Award – Finalist (2011)
- Mobile News Awards: Business Solutions Provider – Winner (2011)
- Parallels New Partner of the Year Award – Winner (2011)
- Comms Business Award: Channel Product of the Year Overall – Winner (2013)
- Comms Business: Most Innovative Channel Product of the Year (Cloud Based Solution Deployed) – Winner (2013)
- Microsoft: Server Platform Partner of the Year Award – Finalist (2013)
- Manchester Evening News: Business of the Year Award (Under £10 Million Turnover) – Winner (2013)
- IT Europa Awards: Service Provider of the Year – Winner (2014)
- UK Cloud Awards: Collaboration Product of the Year – Winner (2014)
- Microsoft: Sales Specialist of the Year – Finalist (2014)
- National Business Awards: Santander Small to Medium-sized Business of the Year and Blackberry Business Enabler of the Year – Finalist (2014)
- Storage, Virtualisation, Cloud (SVC) Awards: Saas Solution of the Year – Winner (2014)
- Microsoft Worldwide Partner of the Year Awards: Public Sector: Government – Finalist (2015)
