= Piers Linney =

British businessman and investor (born 1971)

Piers Linney MBE
- Education: University of Manchester
- Occupations: Businessman television personality
- Known for: Dragons' Den; The Secret Millionaire
- Partner: Nichola Hedger
- Children: Tiger, Electra and Alfie
- Website: www.pierslinney.com

Jonathan Piers Daniel Linney MBE (born 15 February 1971) is a British businessman and investor. Co-Founder of Implement AI He was a former non-executive director of the UK government-owned development bank, British Business Bank, which has facilitated over £12 billion of financing for UK small and medium-sized businesses and also operated the StartUp Loan Company and British Patient Capital, a £2.5bn fund launched in 2018.

He was the co-CEO and owner of Genesis Communications and was the co-CEO of cloud-based IT business Outsourcery. He is best known for taking part on the BBC Two business series Dragons' Den from 2013 to 2015.

Linney also appeared on the Channel 4 series The Secret Millionaire in 2011, where he worked in Wolverhampton at a young offenders' institution.

In November 2018, he was named in the top 20 of Financial Times's list of the top 100 minority ethnic leaders in technology. He was also named in the FT as one of the top 100 BAME Leaders in Tech.

Linney is also a content creator and public speaker that supports entrepreneurs to start-up or grow their businesses as part of his initiative.

== Career ==
Linney studied accounting and law at The University of Manchester, and subsequently qualified as a solicitor with SJ Berwin. He then worked in investment banking, first at Barclays de Zoete Wedd, followed by Credit Suisse. Linney left banking in 2000 to start an internet business and has since been involved in a number of technology, media and telecommunications businesses. After becoming the CEO of a corporate finance boutique, Linney specialised in technology venture capital and securing structured equity and debt finance from US hedge funds for small and mid-cap listed companies. Linney became a partner in a €90 million alternative investment fund providing structured debt and equity financing to small cap public companies.

In 2007, with his business partner Simon Newton, Linney led the buyout of Genesis Communications, a mobile voice and data resale company. In 2009 Genesis acquired Thus Mobile from Cable & Wireless and rebranded as Outsourcery to focus on cloud IT and communications. In 2012 the mobile business arm was sold to Daisy Group for £15 million.

Outsourcery was floated on the Alternative Investment Market (AIM) in 2013 raising £13 million. The business was provided with a debt facility by Vodafone. In June 2016 the business was sold for an undisclosed sum and the company placed into administration, having reached revenues of £10m, but remaining unprofitable.

Linney was a founding member of the governance board of the UK's Cloud Industry Forum and has made appearance in the media to discuss the benefits of cloud computing. In 2014, Linney joined the Cabinet Office SME Panel, advising on small and medium business issues. Linney established the now defunct not-for-profit organisation workinsight.org, a national digital platform that connects young people to local employers.

Linney is a founding trustee of the Powerlist Foundation, and is also a trustee of both the innovation charity Nesta and careers website Plotr. Linney is involved with Virgin Unite and a range of other charities as a donor or patron.

In May 2023, Linney co-founded Implement AI, which completed a £1.3 million seed funding round in September 2025.

== Speaking and public appearances ==
Linney has participated in business and technology events in the United Kingdom. In 2024, he was featured in post-event coverage highlighting sessions at Tech Show London. In 2025, he delivered a session titled “Putting AI to Work” at Tech Show London and was listed as a speaker at Ideas Fest 2025 in a session titled “Grow Your Workforce, Not Your Payroll”, alongside Dr. Aalok.

== Awards and honours ==
- 2013 – Recognised in the JP Morgan-sponsored Power List as one of the top 100 most influential Black Britons.
- 2014 – Named Entrepreneur Leader of the Year at the first Black British Business Awards sponsored by EY.
- 2018 – Listed in the Financial Times top 20 of the top 100 minority ethnic leaders in technology.
- 2018 – Named as one of the top 100 BAME Leaders in Tech by the Financial Times.
- 2024 – Received the Diversity Champion of the Year, European Diversity Awards.
- 2025 – Implement AI named AI Start-Up of the Year (London), UK Startup Awards.
- 2025 – Finalist, AI Entrepreneur of the Year, Great British Entrepreneur Awards (GBEA).
- 2026 – Appointed Member of the Order of the British Empire (MBE) in the 2026 New Year Honours for services to small business, entrepreneurs, investors, banking, diversity, and social mobility.
- 2026 – Finalist, AI Champion category, Black Tech Achievement Awards.

=== Dragons' Den ===
In 2013, Linney joined the panel on the BBC Two television series Dragons' Den, along with fellow new dragon Kelly Hoppen beginning in the eleventh series, replacing Hilary Devey and Theo Paphitis. In January 2015, Linney announced that he would be departing from the show at the end of series twelve, in order to focus on other projects. He departed alongside Hoppen and Duncan Bannatyne, and they were replaced by Nick Jenkins, Touker Suleyman and Sarah Willingham.

Linney invested in Wonderbly (formerly Lost My Name), an award winning independent technology and publishing business that offers personalised children's picture books. Launched in 2012, Wonderbly has sold over 2.7 million books in over 200 countries around the world. Wonderbly raised $8.5m in 2017 from Ravensburger, a leading European publisher of games, puzzles, and children’s books and its existing investors include Google Ventures, Project A Ventures, Greycroft, The Chernin Group and Allen & Co.
