= Sara Davies =

British businesswoman (born 1984)

Sara Davies MBE
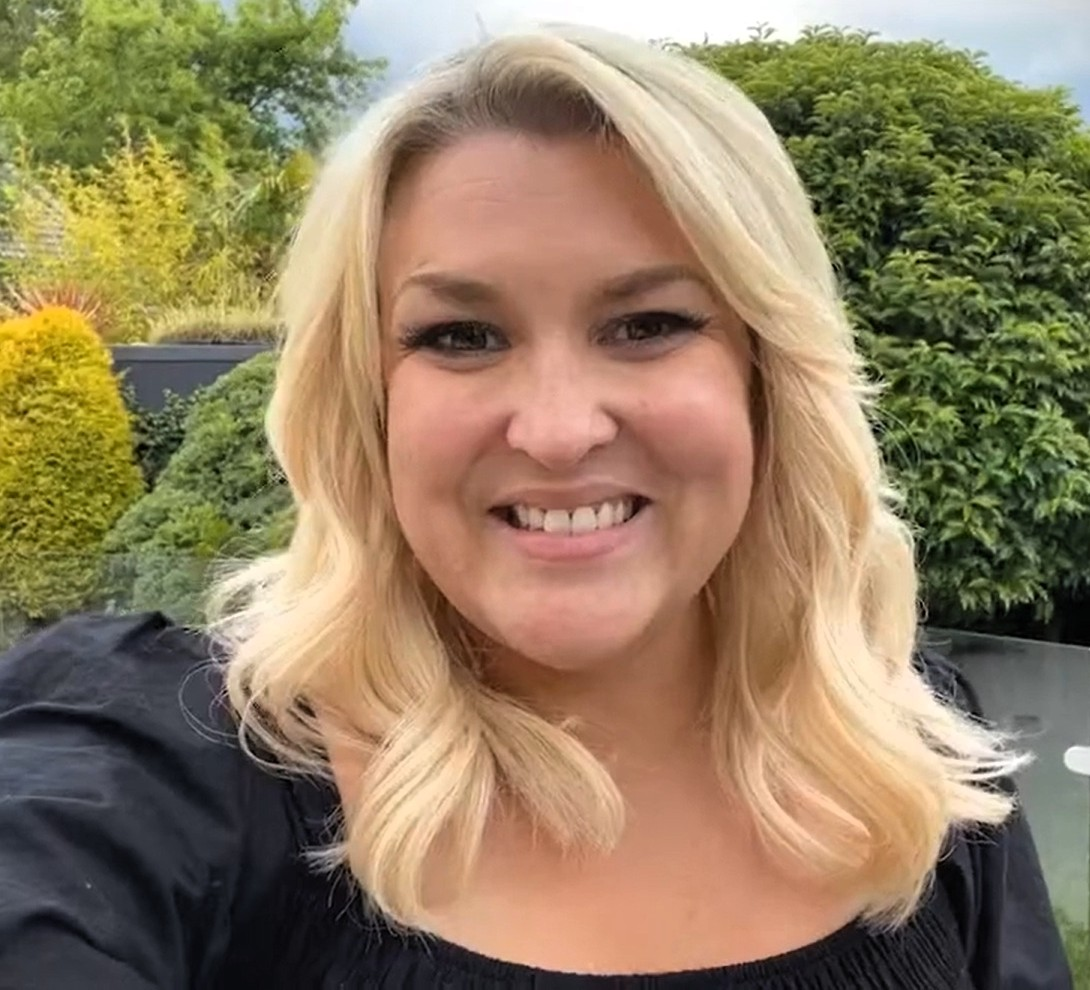
- Davies in 2022
- Born: Sara Johnson; 23 April 1984 (age 42); Coundon, County Durham, England
- Education: Derwent College, York
- Occupations: Businesswoman television personality entrepreneur
- Years active: 2005–present
- Known for: Dragons' Den (2019–2025); Strictly Come Dancing
- Title: Founder and CEO of Crafters Companion
- Website: crafterscompanion.co.uk sara-davies.com

Sara Davies MBE (née Johnson; born 23 April 1984) is a British businesswoman, entrepreneur, and television personality. She is the founder and owner of Crafter's Companion, a company she started while a student at the University of York. In April 2019 it was announced that she would join the panel of the BBC television programme Dragons' Den for its seventeenth series, replacing Jenny Campbell who decided to leave the programme in early 2019. In 2021, Davies was appointed the North East Ambassador for Smart Works Newcastle, a charity supporting unemployed women into work through clothing and coaching. In July 2024, Davies was appointed Chief Inspiration Officer for Avon UK.

== Early life ==
Davies was born in Coundon, County Durham, England, in 1984. She has a sister. She attended St John's School & Sixth Form College in Bishop Auckland, County Durham. She graduated from the University of York with a first class Business degree in 2006. She was a member of Derwent College.

== Career ==
Davies founded Crafter's Companion, a crafter's supply company, whilst at university in 2005. During a placement at a small craft company she spotted a gap in the market for a tool that could create bespoke envelopes for handmade cards and, with the aid of a local carpenter, designed a product called The Enveloper which she launched on the TV shopping channel Ideal World, selling 30,000 units within six months. By the time she graduated, the business was turning over £500,000.

As of 2019, Crafter's Companion exports to more than 40 countries worldwide. The company has a UK headquarters in Newton Aycliffe, outlets in Evesham, Chesterfield and Colne, an office in Corona, California, and employs 200 people worldwide. In 2018, the turnover of Crafter's Companion was said to be nearly £25 million.

In her capacity as an entrepreneur, Davies helps women in business and offers support and guidance to businesses as part of her mentoring role with the Entrepreneurs' Forum.

In January 2025, Davies invested £50,000 in Mystery Jersey King, a Derbyshire-based football shirt mystery box subscription company, during Series 22 of Dragons' Den.

In July 2024 Sara Davies was appointed as Avon UK's chief inspiration officer in moves to help more women build and run their own businesses.

=== Television ===
In 2015, Davies hosted Local Television Limited's (formerly Made in Television) craft show, Be Creative. On 23 April 2019, she joined BBC Two's Dragons' Den as the show's youngest ever female investor. Speaking to the BBC, she said "I've been a fan of the show since it started. I was even invited to pitch on the show 13 years ago, so it feels like I've come a full circle."

From September 2021, Davies competed in the nineteenth series of Strictly Come Dancing where she was paired with Aljaž Škorjanec. They were eliminated in Week 8, after a dance-off with Tilly Ramsay and Nikita Kuzmin.

In 2023, Davies was seen on BBC Four walking around Healey and the Swinton Estate in North Yorkshire in Spring Walks, a new spin-off from Cy Chadwick's Yorkshire Walks/Walking with... format. Also in 2023, she appeared as a contestant on Richard Osman's House of Games.

She has also appeared as a guest in "Dictionary Corner" on Countdown, sitting with Susie Dent.

In July 2024, Davies was appointed Chief Inspiration Officer for Avon UK

In March 2025, ITV announced that Davies would host the upcoming game show Time Is Money which would make its debut on 1 January 2026.

On 6 March 2025, Davies announced that she would be stepping away from filming the next series of Dragons’ Den “for now” to focus on her own business.

In March 2026, Davies appeared as a host on Celebrity Sabotage, hosting the fake show called The Applicant.

In September 2026, Davies appeared as a contestant on The Box.

=== Publications ===
- We Can All Make It, Transworld Publishers Ltd, ISBN 9781529177244
- Craft Your Year with Sara Davies The Crafting Bible, Transworld Publishers Ltd, ISBN 9780857505149

== Awards and honours ==
Davies was appointed Member of the Order of the British Empire (MBE) in the 2016 New Year Honours for services to the economy.

Davies has been recognised with a number of awards for her work as an entrepreneur. In 2010 she was awarded the Ernst & Young Emerging Entrepreneur of the Year award, in 2013 she was presented with the Entrepreneur of the Year at the Shell Women of the Year Awards and she was listed in startups.co.uk's Young Guns Entrepreneurs of the Year class of 2015. She has also been the recipient of two Lloyds Bank National Business Awards: the Santander Small to Medium Sized Business of the Year award in 2010 and the Outstanding Contribution to British Business Award in 2019. On 6 February 2024, Davies received an Honorary degree from the University of York business school.

== Personal life ==
Davies married her husband Simon in September 2007. The couple have two sons and live in Wynyard, County Durham.
