= Hotel GB =

- Genre: Reality
- Created by: One Potato, Two Potato
- Presented by: Paddy McGuinness
- Starring: Gordon Ramsay; Mary Portas; Christian Jessen; Gok Wan; Tim Lovejoy; Phil Spencer; Kirsty Allsopp; Hilary Devey; Sara Cox; Katie Piper; Kim Woodburn; Jimmy Carr; Jonathan Ross
- Theme music composer: Skipjack Music Ltd.
- Country of origin: United Kingdom
- Original language: English
- No. of series: 1
- No. of episodes: 5

Production
- Running time: 60–90 minutes (inc. adverts)
- Production company: Optomen

Original release
- Network: Channel 4
- Release: 1 October – 5 October 2012

Hotel GB is a British reality television series broadcast on Channel 4 airing for five consecutive nights in October 2012. Presented by Paddy McGuinness live from Hotel GB, the show's stars (all of whom feature in Channel 4 shows) take on a one-week challenge, helping unemployed young people find work. It was axed on 1 April 2013 due to poor ratings.

== The team ==
Celebrity	Role
Gordon Ramsay	Co-general managers
Mary Portas	Co-general managers
Christian Jessen	Health and fitness
Kim Woodburn	Housekeeping
Gok Wan	Bar manager
Katie Piper	Spa manager
Phil Spencer	Maitre d'
Kirsty Allsopp	Concierge
Jimmy Carr	Events Manager
Hilary Devey	Hotel Shop Manager
Tim Lovejoy	Social Media Champions
Sara Cox	Social Media Champions

== Ratings ==
Episode viewing figures from BARB.

Episode	Airdate	Total viewers (millions)	Weekly ranking (for Channel 4)
1	1 October 2012	1.90	5
2	2 October 2012	1.58	8
3	3 October 2012	1.50	9
4	4 October 2012	1.59	7
5	5 October 2012	1.36	14
