= Jenny Campbell =

British entrepreneur

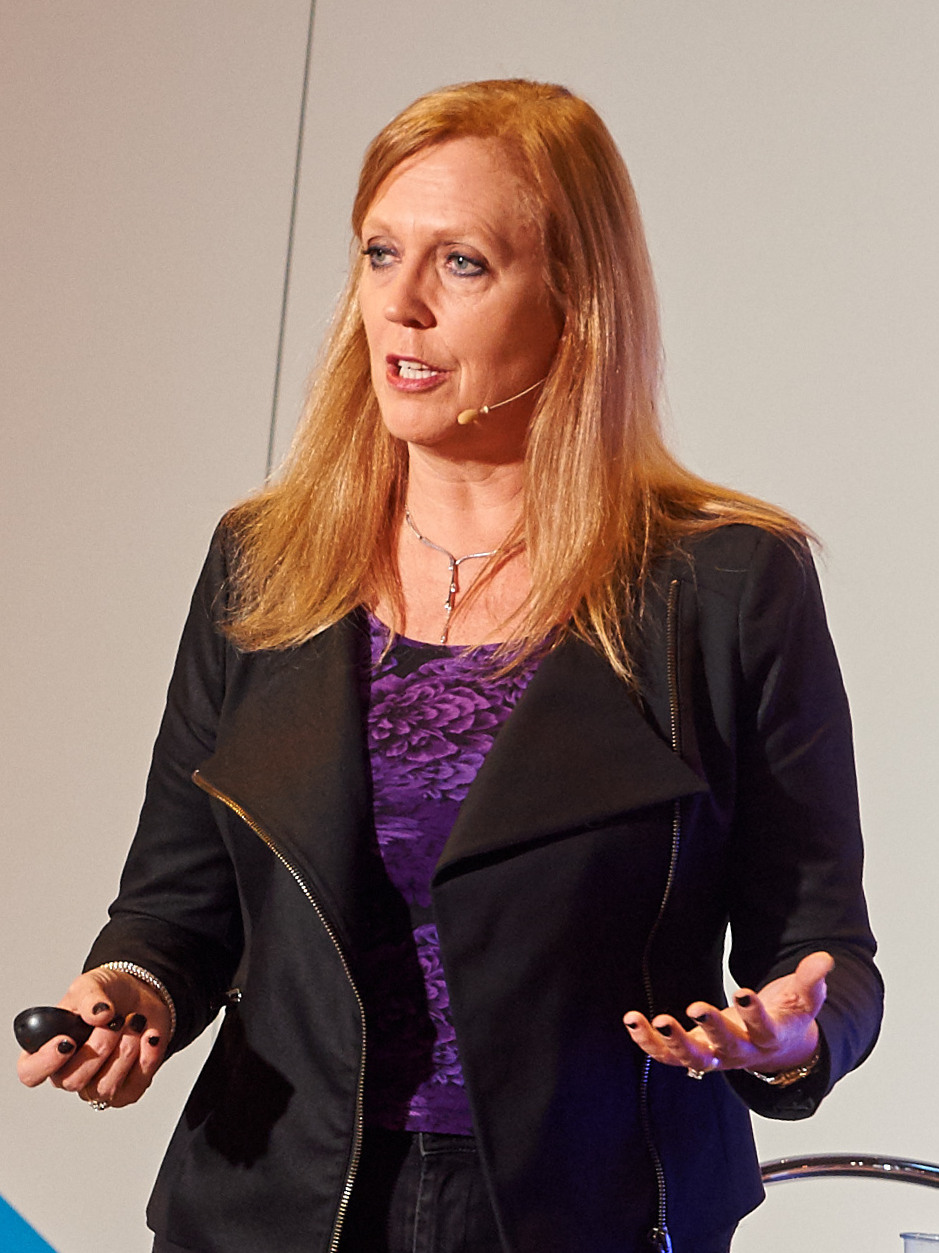
- Jenny Campbell in 2015
- Born: Jennifer Bernice Sproson; 5 October 1961 (age 64); Hyde, Cheshire, England
- Education: Manchester High School for Girls
- Occupations: Businesswoman, television personality, entrepreneur
- Years active: 1978–present
- Known for: Dragons' Den (2017–2019)
- Title: Founder and Chief Executive Officer, YourCash Europe Ltd
- Term: 2006–2016
- Website: jennybcampbell.com

Jennifer Bernice Campbell (née Sproson; born 5 October 1961) is a British entrepreneur. She bought YourCash Europe Ltd from RBS in 2010. She was a "Dragon" in Series 15 and 16 of the UK's Dragons' Den, between 2017 and 2019.

In 2010, Campbell bought Hanco ATM systems from the Royal Bank of Scotland and subsequently renamed the business as YourCash. YourCash is an independent automated teller machine (ATM) provider with operations in Belgium, Ireland, the Netherlands and the UK. Campbell sold the business in 2016. Before YourCash acquisition, she had worked with the Royal Bank of Scotland Group for 32 years in various roles, including sales, operational, change, risk and management.

== Career ==
Campbell left school at 16 to join NatWest as a cash-counter and cash point filler. She attended a night school to study banking and then got a job in NatWest's head office in London. Following the RBS takeover of NatWest in 2000, Campbell was given a senior role in the operational integration of the two banks.

=== Banking and YourCash ===
In 2006, Campbell was appointed as Head of Operations at Hanco ATM Systems, a subsidiary of RBS, which would eventually become YourCash. Hanco had significantly expanded in a short period and had an annual profit of £7 million. The economic recession of 2007 caused RBS to sell Hanco. Campbell seized the opportunity and bid for it. The sale was put on hold until 2009, but in mid-2010, Campbell led the first management buyout of Hanco. Shortly afterwards, she renamed the business YourCash. In 2013, Campbell led a successful secondary buyout of the remaining management and acquired 100% of the business through a refinancing agreement. Campbell became YourCash's primary stakeholder. Under Campbell's guidance, YourCash continued to grow its ATM fleets in the Netherlands and the UK and expanded into Belgium and Ireland.

=== Charity and social work ===
Campbell is involved in charities and projects that support entrepreneurs and disadvantaged young people. This includes The Prince's Trust where she is the Vice President of the Enterprise Fellowship program alongside the Co-Vice President, Nick Wheeler of Charles Tyrwhitt Menswear and the Chairperson, Stelios Haji-Ioannou, the founder of EasyJet.

In 2015, Campbell was admitted as a Freeman of the Guild of Entrepreneurs, which aims to foster the development of founders and new business owners while providing entrepreneurship opportunities to young individuals.

=== Dragons' Den (2017-2019) ===
Campbell joined BBC's reality business program, Dragons' Den in 2017 as a dragon for Series 15 and Series 16. After investing in five companies, she left the show in 2019 to support her sons in their entrepreneurial businesses and to focus on charity work. As a dragon, she invested in ParkingPerx, Didsbury Gin, hemp skincare producer Carun UK, truck advertising firm Driven Media and energy switching service Look After My Bills. Campbell sold her equity in Driven Media, Look After My Bills and Carun in 2019.

Even though Campbell made 12 investments throughout her time on the show, it became a running joke amongst the show's fanbase that she would be "out" relatively quickly. This has even been acknowledged by the official Dragons' Den YouTube channel, which published a compilation video of the companies that Campbell invested in, entitled "6 times Jenny Campbell Forgot to Say "I'm Out"".

=== Directorship ===
Campbell is a Director of her son Tom's construction business, Russon Campbell Developments Limited, a Director of The Kennel Club UK, and a Director of the Woman of the Year Awards.

== Personal life ==
Campbell was born in Hyde, Cheshire, on 5 October 1961. She attended the Manchester High School for Girls. Campbell is married and lives in rural Suffolk with her husband Andrew and several Flat-coated Retrievers. She has two sons. Campbell's hobbies include championship dog breeding, showing and judging.

== Awards and recognitions ==
Campbell is an entrepreneur and a woman-in-business. Her first award came at the age of 23. Having completed her banking qualifications, she was awarded a Chartered Institute of Bankers prize.

In 2011, Campbell was recognized as the Ernst & Young Regional Finalist Entrepreneur of the Year. She also won the silver award for Turnaround Entrepreneur in the Great British Entrepreneur Awards, 2013.

=== Vitalise Business Woman of the Year ===
In 2014, Campbell was named the winner of the Businesswoman of the Year award from Vitalise and was credited for introducing free-to-use ATM and expanding the YourCash business in Europe. The award recognizes the skills and talents of women industrialists who inspire others to reach their potential. Previous recipients of the award include Karren Brady and Hilary Devey.
