= The Apprentice (British TV series) series 7 =

Seventh season of UK television series

The Apprentice
- Series 7
- Promo group shot of Alan Sugar, Nick Hewer and Karren Brady standing before the candidates for series 7
- Starring: Alan Sugar; Nick Hewer; Karren Brady
- No. of episodes: 14

Release
- Original network: BBC One
- Original release: 10 May – 17 July 2011

Series chronology
- ← Previous; Series 6 Next → Series 8

The seventh series of British reality television series The Apprentice was broadcast in the UK on BBC One, from 10 May to 17 July 2011. Due to a qualifying match for the 2011–12 UEFA Champions League set to be aired live on 20 July, the final episode was given an earlier broadcast date to avoid schedule clashing.

After six years of offering a six-figure job as a prize, this series was the first to offer a £250,000 business investment. The change in prize led to a revamp of the series format, with the Interviews stage being the final task, rather than the usual business task. The interviews were also extended to include a scrutiny of each candidate's business plans. Alongside the standard twelve episodes, with the first two airing on consecutive days, two specials were aired alongside this series – "The Final Five" on 7 July; and a series exclusive, "How to Get Hired" on 15 July.

Of the sixteen candidates who took part, Tom Pellereau was crowned the series' winner. Excluding the specials, the series averaged around 8.80 million viewers during its broadcast, and is the most watched series of The Apprentice to date.

== Series overview ==
Following the end of the sixth series, Alan Sugar began to question the overall format of The Apprentice, especially after the controversy caused by series 6 winner, Stella English, who slated the legitimacy of the winning prize after becoming disillusioned with her new role under Alan Sugar. Therefore, the winning candidate would now receive a £250,000 investment towards a new business they wished to start, with Sugar taking a 50% stake in exchange for providing guidance and support, along with supplying a team of experts to help develop the winning candidate's plan.

The change in format was finalised during the processing of applications for the seventh series, between April and July 2011, with Sugar accepting the changes to remain with the programme. For those applying for a place in the programme, the change in prize came as a surprise, as many still expected it to be the six-figure job, effectively leading those who became part of the final line-up having to come up with business plans before filming began. Furthermore, the Interviews stage was extended to include scrutiny of candidates' business plans, alongside the usual questions about their background, work experience and performance on tasks. The change in format also led to the Interviews stage being the final task overall, with the series winner decided in the conclusion of that episode. Following the last series, two of the interviewers – Bordan Tkachuk and Alan Watts – decided to leave the programme, with Mike Soutar and Matthew Riley assuming their roles. The sixteen candidates who were to compete in the series were revealed on 3 May 2011, a week before the series premiered. The team names for this series were Logic and Venture.

This series is notable for featuring a task in which the winning team was not given a prize, since the winning team had failed to perform to a high enough standard. One candidate established the programme's record for the most wins, both consecutive and total. Of those who took part, Tom Pellereau would become the eventual winner, launching a range of mani/pedi products with his new investment. Susan Ma, the series' runner-up, would later receive an investment offer from Sugar, putting it towards creating her skincare company Tropic in 2012.

=== Candidates ===
Candidate	Background	Age	Result
Tom Pellereau	Inventor	31	Winner
Helen Milligan	Executive Assistant to CEO	30	Runner-up
Susan Ma	Natural Skincare Entrepreneur	21	Fired in the Final
Jim Eastwood	Sales and Market Manager	32	Fired in the Final
Natasha Scribbins	Divisional Manager – Recruitment	31	Fired after eleventh task
Melody Hossaini	Founder & Director – Global Youth Consultancy Business	26	Fired after tenth task
Zoe Beresford	Project Manager – Drinks Manufacturer	26	Fired after ninth task
Leon Doyle	Fast Food Marketing Entrepreneur	26	Fired after eighth task
Glenn Ward	Senior Design Engineer	28	Fired after seventh task
Edna Agbarha	Business Psychologist	36	Fired after sixth task
Vincent Disneur	Software Entrepreneur	29	Fired after fifth task
Ellie Reed	Managing Director	33	Fired after fifth task
Felicity Jackson	Creative Arts Entrepreneur	23	Fired after fourth task
Gavin Winstanley	Managing Director – Opticians	27	Fired after third task
Alex Britez Cabral	Estate Agent Manager	28	Fired after second task
Edward Hunter	Accountant	25	Fired after first task

=== Performance chart ===
Candidate	Task Number											
Candidate	1	2	3	4	5	6	7	8	9	10	11	12
Tom	LOSS	LOSS	LOSS	LOSS	LOSS	IN	IN	LOSE	BR	BR	IN	HIRED
Helen	IN	IN	IN	IN	IN	WIN	IN	IN	WIN	BR	WIN	RUNNER-UP
Susan	IN	IN	WIN	IN	IN	BR	BR	WIN	LOSS	IN	BR	FIRED
Jim	LOSS	LOSS	IN	LOSS	LOSS	IN	LOSE	IN	IN	IN	LOSE	FIRED
Natasha	IN	IN	LOSS	BR	BR	IN	WIN	LOSS	IN	WIN	FIRED	
Melody	WIN	IN	LOSS	LOSS	LOSS	IN	IN	BR	BR	FIRED		
Zoe	IN	IN	BR	WIN	IN	LOSE	LOSS	IN	FIRED			
Leon	BR	LOSE	IN	IN	IN	LOSS	IN	FIRED				
Glenn	LOSS	BR	IN	IN	WIN	LOSS	FIRED					
Edna	IN	WIN	IN	IN	IN	FIRED						
Vincent	LOSS	LOSS	BR	LOSS	FIRED							
Ellie	IN	IN	LOSS	BR	FIRED							
Felicity	IN	IN	IN	FIRED								
Gavin	BR	LOSS	FIRED									
Alex	LOSS	FIRED										
Edward	FIRED											

Key:

The candidate won this series of The Apprentice.
The candidate was the runner-up.
The candidate won as project manager on his/her team, for this task.
The candidate lost as project manager on his/her team, for this task.
The candidate was on the winning team for this task.
The candidate was on the losing team for this task.
The candidate was brought to the final boardroom for this task.
The candidate was fired in this task.
The candidate lost as project manager for this task and was fired.

== Episodes ==
No. overall	No. in series	Title	Original release date	UK viewers (millions)
85	1	"£250 Business Start Up"	10 May 2011	8.79
Lord Sugar begins his hunt for a new apprentice, offering the new batch of sixteen candidates a £250,000 business investment. Their first task gives them a taste of this reward – each team is given £250 to invest in produce from New Covent Garden Market, turning this into meals to sell around London. Venture create fruit salads and vegetable pastas, while Logic opt for tomato soup and orange juice, but make a slow start on sales after missing out on the morning trade due to a manufacturing issue. In the boardroom, the women make a substantial turnover, leaving the men to face questions on their performance. Of the final three, Edward Hunter becomes the first to be fired for his terrible leadership, and for not bringing back the candidate whom Lord Sugar and his advisors had identified as the team's weak link.
86	2	"Mobile Phone Application"	11 May 2011	8.30
Teams face the challenge of coming up with their own mobile phone app, with each team promoting their concept to experts and bloggers at a gaming fair. Venture opt for an app combining annoying sounds with random pictures, achieving a moderate number of downloads, despite providing a poor pitch and facing criticism over the concept. Logic opt for an app featuring stereotypical British dialects, but achieve few downloads after their concept is condemned for its offensive stereotypes and limited marketing potential. In the boardroom, the women's concept proves more attractive after achieving a higher number of downloads, leaving the men to face criticism over their app. Of the final three, Alex Britez Cabral is fired for demonstrating no notable skills and for his lack of contribution within the team.
87	3	"Discount Buying for the Savoy"	18 May 2011	8.10
Lord Sugar asks the teams to procure ten items, all required for the refurbishment of the Savoy Hotel before its grand reopening. Venture secure all but one item, conducting poor negotiations in the process. Logic secure six items, negotiating well. Despite Venture receiving a heavy fine, Logic receive more financial penalties, causing them to lose the task. Of the losing team, Gavin Winstanley is ejected from the process after being deemed an ineffective team leader.
88	4	"Beauty Treatments"	25 May 2011	8.62
This week, the teams are tasked with setting up a beauty treatment business in a Birmingham shopping centre. Venture focus on spray-tanning and cold foot-massages and experience decent sales, yet only sell half of their accompanying tanning products and nail polish. Logic opt for hot-shell massages and hair-styling, but receive fewer sales due to limited retail space and poor sales strategy. Logic lose the task, and Felicity Jackson is fired for her indecisive leadership and the mistakes she made that contributed to her team's loss.
89	5	"Create, Brand and Launch a Pet Food"	1 June 2011	7.59
The teams must create a new brand of pet food, complete with a promotional campaign, and pitch their concept to industry experts. Venture opt for dietary cat food, but face questions over an unclear advertising. Logic focus on dog food, receiving praise for a professional advertising campaign, but face criticism over lacking a proper target market and making a false claims about their product. Feedback from the experts leaves Lord Sugar deeming Venture's brand as the more effective design. Logic lose the task, leading to Ellie Reed being fired for her lack of contributions despite a warning from Lord Sugar the previous week, along with Vincent Disneur for not bringing the creator of the team's flawed concept back to the final boardroom.
90	6	"Rubbish"	8 June 2011	8.62
This week's task is to operate a waste disposal service, later selling any valuable scrap they find. Venture acquire little custom on the first day, owing to the decision to charge for their services. Logic enjoy reasonable custom on both days, securing contracts by offering a free service, and focusing on selling high-profit scrap. Venture lose the task and, of the final three, Edna Agbarha is fired after falsely claiming credit for contributions made by other members.
91	7	"Freemium Magazine Launch"	15 June 2011	8.40
The candidates are tasked with creating a new free magazine, while also selling advertising space in it. Venture create a magazine targeted at senior citizens and achieve moderate sales, yet face concerns over the magazine's title. Logic create a magazine targeted at young businessmen and, despite criticism over their concept being outdated and vulgar, they manage to receive considerable sales orders for advertising space. Venture lose the task and, of the final three, Glenn Ward is fired for lack of business experience, and for his failure to make significant contributions.
92	8	"Paris"	22 June 2011	8.78
The teams are tasked with selling British products to the French market. Venture focus on selling a transformable child booster seat and an electronics device stand and secure sizeable orders. Logic focus on selling a teapot-shaped lamp and postcards, but achieve fewer sales. Upon their return to the boardroom, the sale figures show Venture excelled, leaving Logic to face questions over their execution of the task. In the losing team, Leon Doyle is fired for his lack of sales and enthusiasm.
93	9	"Biscuit"	29 June 2011	8.98
The teams must manufacture a brand new type of biscuit, complete with packaging, and pitch their concept to retailers. Venture create a flapjack topped with a thick chocolate star, securing a large order despite most retailers raising concerns over the unclear message of their marketing scheme. Logic create a digestive and buttermilk hybrid biscuit partially coated in chocolate, and are praised for a clear marketing scheme but receive no orders due to criticism of their cheap production costs against their proposed sales price. In the losing team, Zoe Beresford is fired for poor strategy.
94	10	"Flip It"	6 July 2011	9.42
This week, the teams must "smell what sells", and are given £250 worth of wholesale stock to sell, reinvesting the profits in more stock. Venture find success with umbrellas and nodding dogs statues, but are hindered by the team leader's decision to hold off on reinvesting profits until the last minute. Logic fail to reinvest in their most profitable products. Although Venture made more profit Lord Sugar strips them of their prize, since they won by default, rather than with an impressive performance. Of the losing team, Melody Hossaini is fired, as despite Lord Sugar admiring her personality and business skills, he could not hold either of her team-mates responsible for the loss.
95	SP–1	"The Final Five"	7 July 2011	5.29
As the series finale draws closer, this special episode profiles the five remaining candidates. Discussing their backgrounds, experiences, personalities, and strengths and weaknesses, are a selection of candidates' friends, family and colleagues, as well as Lord Sugar's aides, Nick Hewer and Karren Brady.
96	11	"Fast Food Chain"	13 July 2011	9.73
In their penultimate task, the teams must establish a fast-food outlet, operating a trial run, before pitching their concept to industry experts. Venture focus on offering Mexican cuisine, but provide a poor service and unappetising food due to a greater focus on their outlet's decoration. Logic focus on offering a selection of traditional British pies, providing a flawless service and good quality food during their trial run, along with delivering an impressive pitch. Venture lose and, of them, Natasha Scribbins is fired for her lack of contributions despite her hospitality background.
97	SP–2	"How to Get Hired"	15 July 2011	N/A
With the final looming, comedian and Apprentice fan Dara Ó Briain analyses the common mistakes made by candidates, and some of the clever tactics they used to keep them in the process and out of Lord Sugar's firing line.
98	12	"The Final"	17 July 2011	10.24
After facing tasks as teams, the four finalists now face their final task as individuals – a series of tough, gruelling interviews with four of Lord Sugar's most trusted associates to determine who is worthy of investment. The candidates face scrutiny over their backgrounds, work experience, track record, and business proposals. Jim Eastwood is fired for his weak business skills and his business proposal being more suited to a charity, and Susan Ma is fired for concerns over her proposal's scaleability. Of the remaining two, Tom Pellereau is crowned the series' winner for his established track record as an inventor and businessman, leaving Helen Milligan to finishing as runner-up due to concerns over her lack of expertise in her proposal's chosen industry. Notes: Due to live coverage of a UEFA Champions League qualifying match on 20 July, this episode was aired three days earlier to avoid a schedule clash. The series finale was originally broadcast as part of a two-hour crossover special with the programme's sister show, You're Fired; following the special, subsequent repeats broadcast only the final episode.

== Ratings ==
Official episode viewing figures are from BARB.

Episode no.	Airdate	Viewers (millions)	BBC One weekly ranking
1	10 May 2011	8.79	4
2	11 May 2011	8.30	7
3	18 May 2011	8.10	5
4	25 May 2011	8.62	4
5	1 June 2011	7.59	1
6	8 June 2011	8.62	3
7	15 June 2011	8.40	5
8	22 June 2011	8.78	2
9	29 June 2011	8.98	1
10	6 July 2011	9.42	1
11	13 July 2011	9.73	2
12	17 July 2011	10.24	1

Specials

Episode	Airdate	Viewers (millions)	BBC One weekly ranking
The Final Five	7 July 2011	5.29	12
How To Get Hired	15 July 2011	—N/a	—N/a
