= Razzamataz Theatre Schools =

British theatre school

Razzamataz Theatre Schools is a UK-based theatre school that teaches dance, drama and singing at franchised locations. It was founded by Denise Hutton-Gosney in 2000 in Penrith, Cumbria, England.

== Format ==
The school runs predominantly on Saturdays teaching one hour of singing, one hour of dancing, and one hour of drama. Students are divided into different groups, based on age. These groups are Tots (2-3), Minis (4-5), Juniors (6-8), Inters (9-11), and Seniors (12-18). They hold summer schools, birthday parties, after-school clubs, and Project Intense classes which are extra sessions focused on technique and performance growth.

== Dragon's Den ==
In 2007, Denise Hutton-Gosney took Razzamataz to the BBC business programme, Dragons' Den. Her pitch won over investor Duncan Bannatyne who helped to launch the company all over the UK and abroad.
