= Marketing exposure =

Marketing exposure, sometimes referred as advertising exposure, is the degree to which a company's target market is exposed to the company’s communications about its product/ services, initiatives, etc. Exposure is the product of a marketing strategy, and once the strategy is implemented it is only a matter of time before exposure is put into action. Consumers recognize "marketing exposure" when the company creates and promotes a campaign. There are three types of marketing exposure: intensive, selective, and exclusive.

== Overview ==
Marketing exposure is put into action after a marketing strategy has been implemented. In the marketing world, exposure is a number within a portfolio. In the consumer world, exposure is a company's campaign or brand that is trying to market specific products to help service the consumer. It is also a way to make a business stand out in the marketplace. Without marketing exposure, campaigns would be non-existent and therefore companies would suffer.

== Purpose ==
Marketing exposure is a major part that determines a company's success in their market. Although it is never directly identified or defined, it crucial for helping a company progress, creating competition for other companies, making the company more credible with consumers, and overall benefit both the company while satisfying consumers. While all of this may seem easy, it typically takes months of preparation to create, launch, and manage a campaign. Campaigns must be exposed thoroughly in the market as much as possible without annoying or bothering consumers to the point of "overexposing" the campaign. There is a fine balance between keeping the consumers interested in a product or brand, and annoying them to the point that they have no interest in supporting a company. To expose a campaign successfully, many factors must be considered. Exposure is not only limited to a consumer base, exposure can also be to other companies in the market. These companies do not have to be similar to the business which aims for positive exposure, on the contrary the companies should be diverse which can reach into other markets opening up new pathways. Also as advised before diversifying into many sectors also reduces the risk of profit loss where as being too diverse means resources are stretched out very thin causing minimum returns. There must be a balances between taking risks and diversifying.

== Objectives ==
Exposure objectives are the basic goals that the company is looking to accomplish in their campaign. Among the important goals, first understanding their consumer is key. For successful exposure, the company must create a target market—identify the specific consumer and their needs. Consumer factors and environmental factors can determine whether or not the company is capable of selling their product or service. Therefore, the company must evaluate what they have to offer and then determine how their product can help the consumer. Once the consumer and their needs have been identified, companies can figure out their goals and strategies as to how they can get the consumer to choose their product or service over the competitor's.

=== Factors ===
Within the objectives, factors must be taken into consideration. Factors fall into Environmental, Consumer, Product, and Company categories. Understanding these factors and how they effect the marketplace can greatly determine whether or not the objectives (or goals) can be attained.

==== Environmental ====
Environmental factors include change in every day consumer life. Examples include changes in family lifestyles, advances in technology, and the way consumers use the Internet. Companies cannot directly control changes in the environment, however they can create objectives or ways to market the product. If the company can expose the product in the right way, companies can convince the consumer that the product improves their environment and creates a service they believe they need.

==== Consumer ====
Consumer factors are key to selling a product. A company is capable of taking their product and selling it to potential buyers only if company understands their buyers. That is why companies must ask important questions such as: Who are potential customers? Where do they buy? When do they buy? How do they buy? What do they buy? Having a deeper understanding of these questions helps companies analyze their consumer and determine how to best approach them.

==== Product ====
The company's product is something that the company already has a deep understanding of. What makes the product such an important factor is determining its purpose and value in the marketplace. The purpose of the product depends on the tasks it completes, how small or large it is, and its complexity just to name a few.

Next, the value in the particular marketplace is important. For example, a product such as a scientific computer is expensive, which eliminates many consumers because not many want to pay for a scientific computer. On the other hand, pepper, an inexpensive commodity, attracts many more consumers since they use it in everyday life—so the consumer demographic is much larger.

==== Company ====
Company factors are of highest importance. The company must understand their place in the marketplace and recognize their financial, human, and technological capabilities. The financial, human, and technological capabilities of a company determine how efficiently the company can execute their campaign. Once these factors are understood and recognized, the company can then create a successful campaign. Companies must also connect with other companies for the most effect in exposure. This is due to the reason that branching out to make connections will create bonds and pathways for companies to extend into other markets which they can receive more exposure. If done correctly the exposure gained will result on sales of goods and services increasing which would mean the exposure to these new markets would cause the investments into such sectors open and increase the return on investments.

== Strategizing ==
Once objectives are set, the company can begin strategizing how they can successfully approach and execute their campaign. The basic principles of marketing strategy are simply stated: to achieve persistent success in the marketplace over competition. With these basic principles, the company must recognize their competition, and strategize how they can be unique, while yielding positive results in the marketplace. To yield the best results in the market place requires two essential elements: the issue of the position, specifically within the 'strategic triangle' (the customers, competitors, and corporation), and of time (the analysis of the past and future). Using these principles and essential elements, companies must develop their campaign strategies. The company must develop these strategies and then determine their rate of exposure, who they are exposing it to, and how they plan on presenting the information. These strategies embody a range of marketing techniques from the campaign slogan to where advertising is placed.

Many companies and brands use 5 tactics of marketing exposure. They are: online advertisement (for example any form of social media), product bundling (which is pairing ur products with other small and inexpensive items to create an illusion of receiving more for what one is paying), giving a product away to influencers or even regular people in order to spread awareness on a product, "Buy one and get another free" (one very popular yet not spoken about strategy which encourages people to buy a product over other products); and product testing (which encourages others to trust not only the product but the brand as well).

== The Portfolio ==
The general goal of the portfolio is to compile data to show to customers or employers how successful or unsuccessful the campaign and exposure was. Since the 2008 financial crisis, it has been crucial for companies to use portfolios. The marketing exposure portfolio holds all of the monetary information that assesses how the exposure is interacting with consumers in the marketplace, the amount of money being spent on the campaign, as well as the amount of returns the company is getting for the campaign from the consumers. This portfolio helps to determine the gross potential, and when the company can break even.

After the campaign has ended, it also allows the company to assess how well their campaign worked and whether or not consumers embraced the company's product. After reviewing these numbers companies can then assess the effectiveness of the campaign and if in the future events the campaign needs to be changed. by keeping connected to the target market companies can read the thought patterns and plan for future implementations of the type of exposure which would result a high profit with the least amount of cost and use of resource.
