= Trunki =

Hand luggage brand

Trunki is a brand of ride-on/carry-on hand luggage for children, designed by Rob Law. The product became well-known after featuring on the UK television series Dragons' Den in 2006.

Trunki has won more than a hundred product and design awards, including several from Design Week, Progressive Preschool, Mother and Baby Magazine, D & AD, children's retailer Right Start, Practical Parenting magazine and the Nick Jr. television channel.

== History ==
Magmatic, the company that manufactures the Trunki range, was formed on 5 May 2006.

Inventor Rob Law MBE came to public attention in 2006 following an appearance on BBC2's Dragons' Den programme in which panellist, Theo Paphitis, tugged and broke the strap of a sample Trunki. Dragon Richard Farleigh then expressed interest in £100,000 for 50% of the company, a suggestion which Law rejected.

In 2016 Trunki celebrated its 10th anniversary - Magmatic has sold more than 3,000,000 Trunki suitcases, in over 100 countries worldwide, through retailers including John Lewis, Argos, Harrods, Tesco and Next since May 2006.

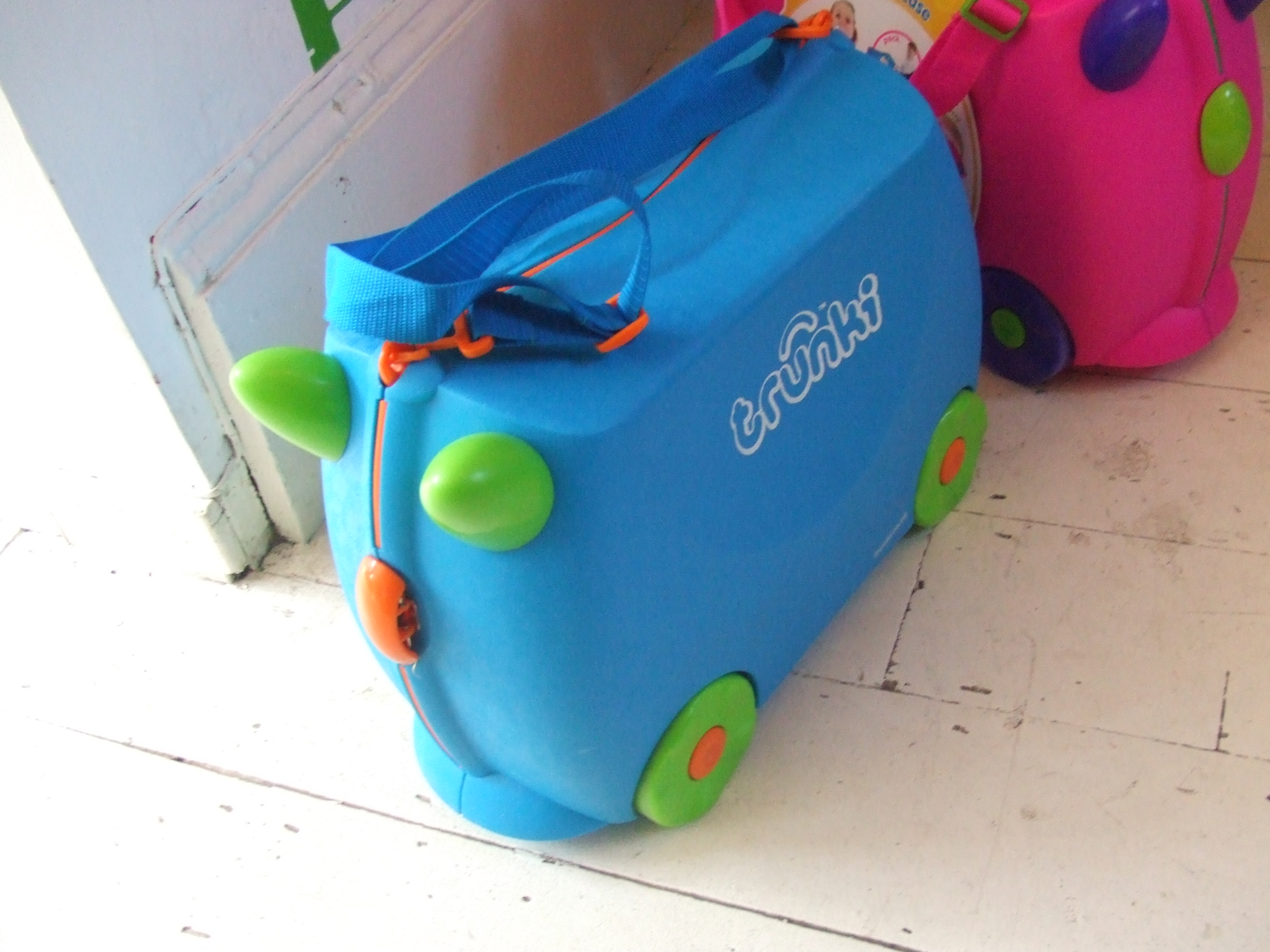
A Trunki Suitcase

More than 500 articles have appeared about the Trunki in the British media and several television programmes have since featured Rob Law, including Working Lunch, Beat the Boss, This Morning and GMTV. In June 2011 the Trunki BoostApak was featured on BBC 1's The Apprentice. It was taken to France for contestants to see and broke the record for boardroom orders with an order of €214,000. Following this, sales of the Trunki BoostApak quadrupled.

On 30 August 2008, Duncan Bannatyne, a panelist on Dragon's Den, appeared on ITV's Who Wants to Be a Millionaire? and when asked by presenter Chris Tarrant "Is there a sort of classic of one you've missed?" replied, "There is one, a little suitcase on wheels... every time I go to an airport I see one or two of these of these... it's the only one we missed out on I think."

== Made In The UK ==
On 5 May 2012, the company's sixth anniversary, Magmatic expanded their production into the UK. The first Trunki to roll off the UK production line was the Team GB Trunki, and the company claimed that by the end of 2012 all Trunki suitcases sold in the UK will have been made there too. All UK made cases will be stamped "Made in England".

The design of the Trunki is registered as a Community Design. On 3 November 2015, the United Kingdom Supreme Court started to hear a case over the extent of legal protection of the Trunki design. PMS International, a Hong Kong firm, produce a similar range of products branded Kiddee Cases. Magmatic won the case in the High Court – the lowest civil court in England and Wales – in 2013, but it was overturned on appeal in 2014. The issue to be decided is "What significance attaches to the fact that a graphical representation of a Community registered design shows no surface decoration?"

== Product Range ==
Since launching their ride-on suitcase in 2006, Magmatic have expanded their product offering to include the following ranges:

Product	Function
BoostApak	Booster Seat That Doubles As A Backpack
PaddlePak	Children's Swimming Backpack
ToddlePak	Fuss Free Toddler Reins
EAT Range	2-in-1 Lunch Bag Backpack, Drinks Bottles & Snack Pots
Yondi	Neck Cushion
Extras	Accessories To Be Used With The Original Trunki

== Editions ==
Trunki Suitcase	Collection	Year released
Terrance	Original	2006
Trixie	Original	2006
Frieda (Cow)	Animals	2008
Tipu (Tiger)	Animals	2009
Harley (Ladybird)	Animals	2009
Gruffalo	Licensed	2009
Bernard (Bee)	Animals	2010
Rex (T-Rex)	Imaginary	2011
Benny (Cat)	Animals	2013
Hello Kitty	Licensed	2013
George	Special	2013
Rosie	Special	2013
Bluebell (Horse)	Animals	2014
Boris (Bus)	Transport & Vehicles	2014
Frank (Fire Truck)	Transport & Vehicles	2015
Pearl (Carriage)	Transport & Vehicles	2015
Zimba (Zebra)	Animals	2015
Gerry (Giraffe)	Animals	2016
Una (Unicorn)	Imaginary	2017
Pedro (Pirate)	Imaginary	2017

== Sources ==
- Wallop, Harry (13 August 2007). "Dragons' Den reject has got it in the bag". The Daily Telegraph. London.
- Frost, Liz (14 August 2008). "We've slain the Dragons". Daily Express.
- "Dragon's Den - Where are they now?". bbc.co.uk. BBC. Archived from the original on July 3, 2009.
- "Rob Law MBE rose to fame after his failed appearance on Dragon's Den, following which his business boomed". Bristol Post. 8 June 2011.
