= Hilary Devey =

English television personality (1957–2022)

Hilary Devey CBE
- Born: Hilary Lorraine Brewster; 10 March 1957; Bolton, Lancashire, England
- Died: 11 June 2022 (aged 65); Marrakesh, Morocco
- Occupations: Television personality, businesswoman
- Employer(s): Channel 4 (most recent); BBC (former)
- Known for: Dragons' Den (2011–2012); Hotel GB (2012); The Intern (2013); Running the Shop (2015); Loose Women (2015)
- Title: CEO and chairman of Pall-Ex Group
- Term: 1996–2022
- Spouses: Malcolm Sharples (m. 1976; div. 1978); Ed Devey (m. 2003; div. 2008); Philip Childs (m. 2011; div. 2013)
- Children: 1
- Website: www.hilarydevey.com

Hilary Lorraine Devey CBE (née Brewster; 10 March 1957 – 11 June 2022) was an English businesswoman and television personality best known for her role on the BBC Two programme Dragons' Den until she left to present the Channel 4 series The Intern.

== Early life ==
Devey was born Hilary Lorraine Brewster on 10 March 1957, in Bolton, Lancashire. As a seven-year-old child, she witnessed the results of the bankruptcy of her father, who had owned a central heating company, when bailiffs removed furniture and household goods from the family home. Her father then earned a living managing pubs and hotels. She left school at the age of sixteen, and served for a short while in the Women's Royal Air Force, in air traffic control and the supply accounts department; she was stationed at RAF Brize Norton. Devey later moved to London.

== Career ==
=== Business ===
Devey made her fortune launching Pall-Ex, a palletised freight network. Launched in 1996, Pall-Ex was the third palletised goods distribution network to be launched in the UK. It was based on the well-established hub-and-spoke express parcels distribution model: this form of pallet network was pioneered by Palletline in 1992.

Pall-Ex handles around 8,000 palletised consignments through its Leicestershire hub each day and has over 90 network members. In 2021 it had a turnover of £92.1 million, compared with £76.6 million in 2020. In 2021 gross profits were £10.9 million.

=== Television ===
Devey featured in several television programmes, including The Secret Millionaire in 2008, in which she donated more than £70,000 to the Back Door Music Project and the Syke Community Centre in Rochdale. In March 2010, she was the presenter of The Business Inspector for Channel 5, a four-part documentary series which saw her use her business acumen and expertise to help transform struggling small businesses into successful profitable companies.

In February 2011, Devey joined the panel of the BBC Two programme Dragons' Den following the departure of James Caan. Devey later announced that she would be leaving the series in June 2012, as she had signed an exclusive two-year agreement with Channel 4. She departed alongside fellow Dragon Theo Paphitis, and they were replaced by Kelly Hoppen and Piers Linney.

In September 2012, Devey presented her final programme for BBC Two, a mini-series called Hilary Devey's Women at the Top, a joint Open University and BBC Two production.

In April 2013, after moving to Channel 4, Devey began hosting a new series, The Intern, a business documentary in which Devey gave three young interns a week's trial in the job of their dreams. The first three episodes were aired in the Thursday 9 pm time slot, but the final three episodes were broadcast on Wednesday nights at the later time of 11 pm, due to a significant drop in ratings.

On 3 April 2014, Devey announced that she would host a new Channel 4 programme, which began filming in June 2014. The show, named Running the Shop, began airing on Channel 4 on 9 June 2015.

On 18 June 2015, Devey made her debut as a guest panellist on the ITV lunchtime chat show Loose Women, and became an occasional panellist on 4 September that year. However, she departed the show on 9 November.

== Awards ==
Devey was awarded the Vitalise Woman of the Year Award in 2008, and an Honorary Doctorate of Law by the University of Leicester in 2010 for her services to industry. Other UK domestic awards have included the Sir Robert Lawrence Award for Lifetime Achievement from the Chartered Institute of Logistics and Transport in 2009 and the Personality of the Year in the International Freight Weekly Awards for 2010.

In July 2012, Devey was awarded an Honorary Doctorate of Business Administration by the University of Bolton, for services to business.

Devey was appointed Commander of the Order of the British Empire (CBE), in the 2013 Birthday Honours, for services to the transport industry and charity.

On 16 April 2014, Devey was awarded an Honorary Degree of Doctor of Business Administration from the University of Wolverhampton.

Devey was an ambassador of the British Citizen Awards, a ceremony held bi-annually to reward everyday individuals and their contribution to society.

== Personal life ==
Devey previously lived near Burton upon Trent, Staffordshire, England, but then relocated to Boylestone in Derbyshire. She also had a house in London and villas in Morocco, Spain, and Boca Raton, Florida, and for a time, owned a mansion in the state, which she sold in 2014 for £5.42 million. She was married and divorced three times. She also had a son named Mevlit, who she said in 2013 had successfully overcome drug addiction.

On 28 October 2012, whilst on BBC Radio 4's Desert Island Discs, Devey shared a story about her mother's discovery, years into her relationship with Devey's father, that he already had a wife and four children. Devey also discovered that her ex-partner was also already married with five children.

=== Charity ===
Devey campaigned for various charities, including Carers Trust, of which she became vice-president in 2012. She donated to charity one penny for each pallet distributed by the Pall-Ex network through her 'Penny a Pallet' scheme. She also supported the Stroke Association, for which she became a patron in 2010.

== Death ==
On 11 June 2022, Devey died at her holiday home in Marrakesh, Morocco, following a long illness, aged 65.

== Filmography ==
Television

Year	Title	Role	Channel
2008	The Secret Millionaire	A Secret Millionaire	Channel 4
2010	The Business Inspector	Presenter	Channel 5
2011–2012	Dragons' Den	Dragon	BBC Two
2012	Hilary Devey's Women at the Top	Presenter	BBC Two
2012	Hotel GB	Hotel Shop Manager	Channel 4
2013	The Intern	Presenter	Channel 4
2015	Running the Shop	Presenter	Channel 4
2015	Loose Women	Regular panellist	ITV

Guest appearances

- Room 101 (2012)
- The Million Pound Drop (2013)
- Fifteen to One (20 June 2014)
- Through the Keyhole (4 October 2014)
- Safeword (3 September 2015)

== Books ==
- Bold as Brass: My Story (2012), London, Macmillan, ISBN 978-0-230-76593-1
