= Travel Counsellors =

Travel and holiday company in the United Kingdom

- Industry: Travel agency
- Founded: 1994; 32 years ago in Bolton, England
- Founder: David Speakman
- Headquarters: Manchester, United Kingdom
- Number of locations: 2,100 franchises
- Area served: Worldwide
- Key people: Steve Byrne, CEO Ivan Bumstead CFO
- Revenue: £1 billion
- Website: www.travelcounsellors.co.uk

Travel Counsellors Ltd. is a travel agency headquartered in Manchester, England. When it was established in 1994, it was a pioneer of home-based travel selling. It has operations in the United Kingdom, Ireland, the Netherlands, Belgium, South Africa and the United Arab Emirates.

== History ==
The company was established in 1994 by David Speakman and his wife Maureen.

In October 2014, Steve Byrne led a management buyout of the company, backed by Equistone Partners Europe.

In September 2015, the company announced plans to move its headquarters from Bolton to Manchester.

In June 2018, Vitruvian Partners financed an additional management buyout in which David Speakman and his wife Maureen sold their remaining interest in the company.

In April 2020, the company established a fund to financially assist agents that were affected by the COVID-19 pandemic.

== Recognition ==
The company was ranked 89th on the UK's best 100 companies to work for by The Sunday Times in February 2020.
