= Black British Business Awards =

Annual award ceremony

- Current: Black British Business Awards 2024
- Awarded for: Outstanding achievements and performance of Black people in British business
- Country: United Kingdom
- Presented by: Melanie Eusebe and Sophie Chandauka
- Hosted by: Melanie Eusebe
- First award: January 11, 2014; 12 years ago
- Final award: 2025; 1 year ago
- Website: thebbbawards.com

The Black British Business Awards are British awards that celebrates the achievements and performance of Black people in British businesses. The awards were designed to highlight the contributions Black people have made to the British economy and to combat stereotypes.

== History ==
The awards were founded by Melanie Eusebe who serves as its chair and Sophie Chandauka to promote understanding of the economic contributions and potential of the Black community in the workforce, boardrooms, and customer segments. The founders started the awards to showcase the contributions made to the British economy by Black people.

=== Inaugural ceremony ===
The inaugural ceremony took place in 2014. The awards are divided into several categories, including Arts and Media, Consumer and Luxury, Entrepreneur, Financial Services, Professional Services, and Black British Businessperson of the Year.

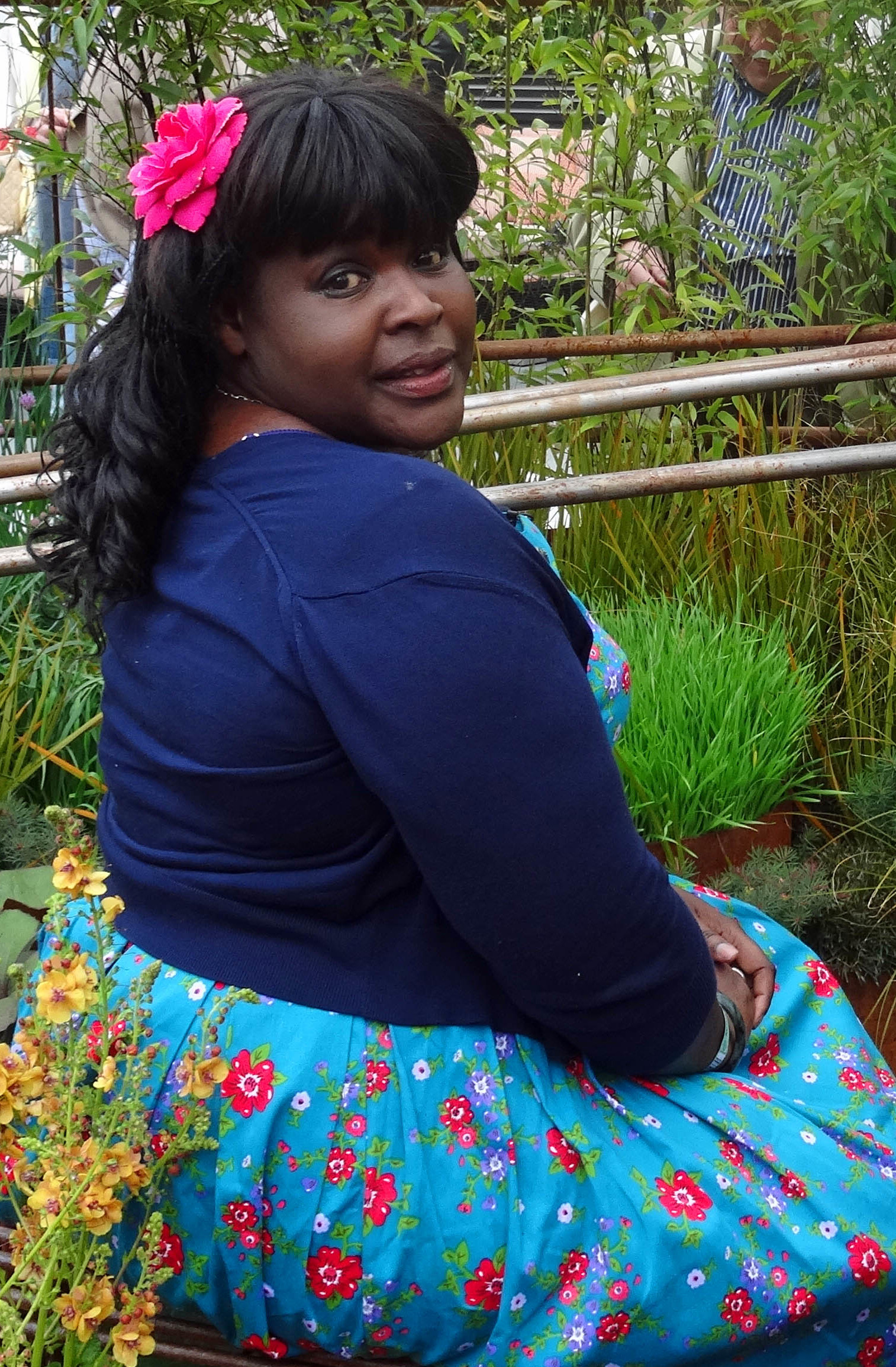
Maggie Aderin-Pocock was the winner of the 2014 category Science, Technology, Engineering and Mathematics at the awards.

The winners of the awards are selected by an independent panel of judges consisting of senior executives from various sectors.

== Leadership ==
The current leadership of the Black British Business Awards includes Melanie Eusebe and Sophie Chandauka, who are the co-founders and chairs of the organization.

== List of ceremonies ==
=== 2014 ===
Category	Leader	Rising star	Result	Reference
Financial Services	Trevor Williams	Lorraine Wright	Won	
Fast-Moving Consumer Goods	Wilfred Emmanuel Jones	Timi Dorgu	Won	
Infrastructure and Manufacturing	David Waboso	Jim Lenga-Kroma	Won	
Media and the Arts	Darcus Beese	Joanna Abeyie	Won	
Professional Services	Tom Shropshire	Chike Eduputa	Won	
Science, Technology, Engineering and Mathematics	Maggie Aderin-Pocock	Anne-Marie Imafidon	Won	
Entrepreneur of the Year	Piers Linney	Philip Poku	Won	
Black British Business Person of the Year	Margaret Casely-Hayford	Vince Cable	Won	

== See also ==
- Melanie Eusebe
