= Susie Ma =

British entrepreneur

- Born: 22 November 1988 (age 37); Shanghai, China
- Education: Croydon High School (2002–07)
- Alma mater: University College London
- Occupation: Entrepreneur
- Years active: 2012–present
- Known for: The Apprentice, Tropic Skincare

Susie Ma is a British-Chinese skincare entrepreneur. She is best known for her appearance on the seventh series of the BBC television series The Apprentice in 2011 where, despite coming in third place, she secured investment from Alan Sugar. Her company, Tropic Skincare has been cited as one of the fastest-growing brands in the UK, with annual revenue of £90.6 million.

As of March 2025, the Sunday Times estimated her net worth at £73 million.

== Career ==
=== 2010–11: The Apprentice ===
Susie Ma was one of the final three contestants on the seventh series of The Apprentice but lost to winner, inventor Tom Pellereau.

Tropic Skincare remains the only business run by an Apprentice runner-up, to have gone on to secure investment from Lord Sugar. He invested £200,000 for a 50% stake in Tropic in 2012.

=== 2012–present: Tropic Skincare ===
In May 2013, Ma and Sugar launched Tropic's ambassador programme, a direct-selling model that allows people to earn commission through selling Tropic products. As of 2025, there are over 38,000 ambassadors in the UK.

In April 2023, Ma regained full ownership of Tropic, buying back Lord Sugar's shares in the business for an undisclosed sum. Ma commented on the news, "After founding the company at just fifteen, and spending every day since building it into the success you see today, reclaiming full ownership has always been my ambition. I am beyond excited for the infinite possibilities the future holds, and to continue making a positive impact on the planet with our natural, freshly made formulations and inspiring Ambassadors."

In 2025, Ma paid herself £20 million in dividends after buying out Lord Sugar's stake, following a 30 percent rise in profits to £8.7 million.

== Personal life and early career ==
Susie Ma was born in Shanghai, China, and her family later relocated to Cairns, Australia in 1996. She settled in London, UK in 2002. She attended Croydon High School for Girls from 2002 to 2007. In the evenings, she took cosmetic formulation courses to extend her knowledge and Tropic's product range. She initially made the products in her kitchen at home, and sold them on weekends at markets around London. Later, in 2007, she attended University College London and graduated in 2010 with a bachelor's degree in philosophy and economics, followed by an FX sales and trading internship at Citigroup. In 2024, Ma became a mother to a daughter.

== Awards and accolades ==
In March 2025, Ma appeared at number nine on the inaugural The Sunday Times Beauty Rich List, with an estimated personal worth of £73m.

The Sunday Times listed Ma as one of the 40 richest people in the UK under 40 in May 2024.
