= FreeSharing Network =

The FreeSharing Network was an international free recycling network that redistributes unwanted usable items by making them available free via a network of locally managed internet mailing lists.

FreeSharing.org was created on February 8, 2005 as an alternative to the existing The Freecycle Network. At the time several existing Freecycle groups expressed displeasure with the sponsorship of Freecycle by Waste Management Inc.

More recently several Freecycle groups became displeased with Freecycle's trademark enforcement practices and their continuing legal battles against free recycling groups not affiliated with TFN and chose to become independent and list their groups in the FreeSharing.org directory.

The website FreeSharing.org was created by Eric Burke of Anderson, South Carolina to act as a directory of independent, free recycling groups and to continue the work of sharing usable items with the community instead of throwing them in the trash.

On July 3, 2007 there were 733 groups in the directory serving over 250,000 members in the USA, Canada, UK and around the world.

== Similar sites ==
- Freegle
- The Freecycle Network
- Regiving
- Any Good To You
