= Gift =

Item given to someone without the expectation of anything in return

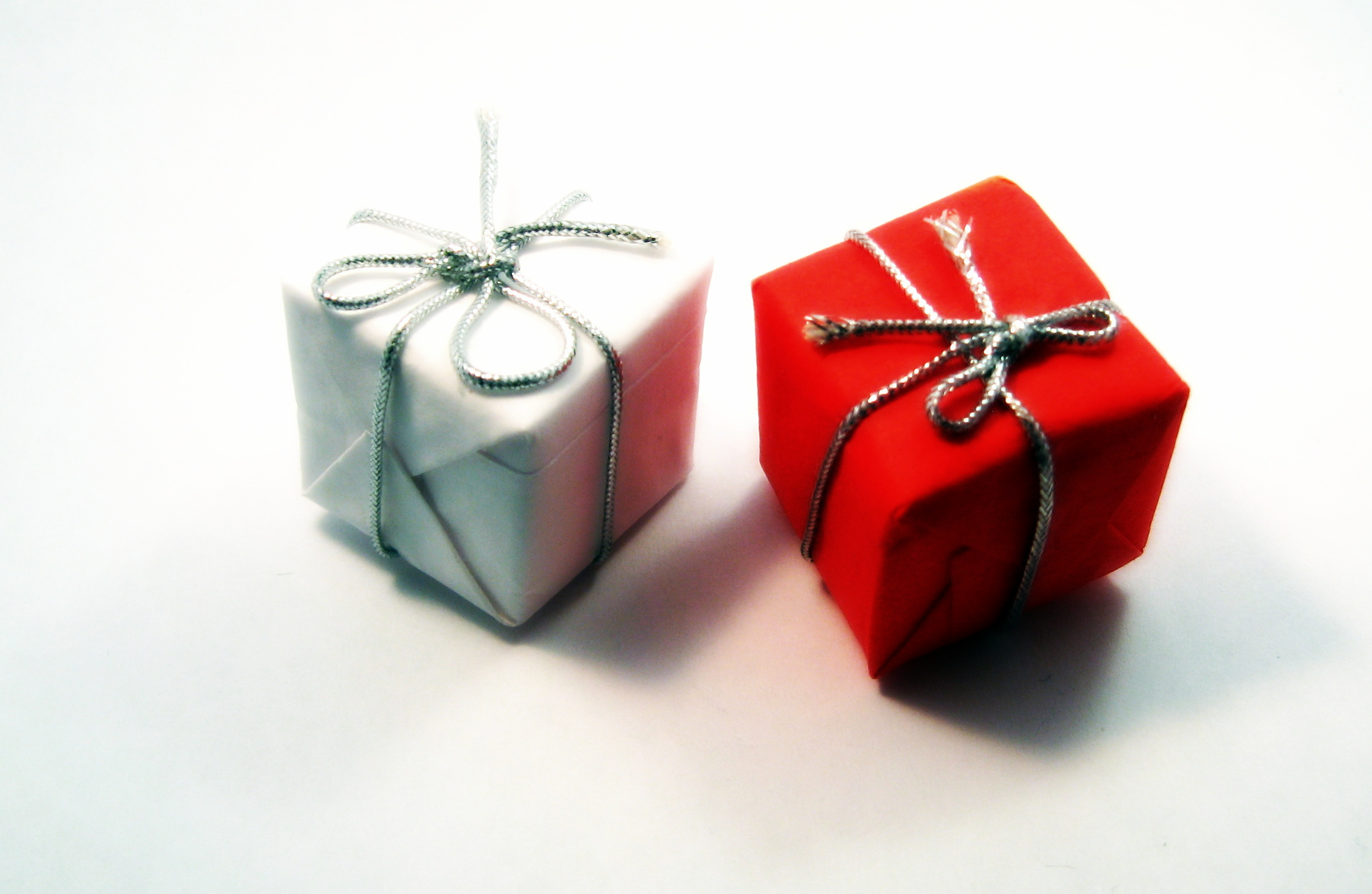
Small gift boxes

A gift, also known as a present, is an item given to someone without the expectation of payment or anything in return. In many countries, the act of mutually exchanging money, goods, etc., may sustain social relationships and contribute to social cohesion. Economists have elaborated the economics of gift-giving into the notion of a gift economy. By extension, the term gift can refer to any item or act of service that makes the other happier or less sad, especially as a favor, including forgiveness and kindness. Gifts are often presented on occasions such as birthdays and holidays.

== History ==
The history of gift-giving is a longstanding human tradition that predates recorded history. The practice has evolved across different cultures and eras, serving various purposes ranging from expressions of love and respect to political allegiance and social obligation. Gift-giving has been documented in archaeological records, ancient literature, religious texts, and historical accounts. Gift-giving has played a central role in social and economic systems throughout human history. Anthropologist Marcel Mauss argued in The Gift that early archaic society presented gifts in many forms (banquets, rituals, women, festivals) in an act of obligatory politeness in a system of 'total services'.

Archaeological evidence suggests that gift-giving existed among early hominins. Anthropologists believe that the exchange of items, such as tools, food, and ornamental objects, played a role in social bonding and the establishment of alliances among hunter-gatherer communities. For example, the Khoisan people of southern Africa practiced gift exchange as part of social interaction and conflict avoidance mechanisms.

=== Ancient ===
In Ancient Egypt, kings, nobles, and many officers of state gave metal statues and deities for devotional purposes and as offerings to temples and shrines. Normal visitors to these sacred places would give out perishable items including food, drinks or flowers before the development of mass-produced metal casting which helped increase more wealthy donations. Similarly, in Mesopotamian and Sumerian societies, gifts played a role in diplomacy and religious offerings. Kings exchanged gifts to reinforce alliances and display wealth.

In ancient Greece and Rome, gift-giving was integral to social and political life. The practice was governed by social norms and expectations, often involving reciprocal obligations. The Roman concept of donum (gift) extended to both personal and state affairs, including patron-client relationships, religious donations, and diplomatic exchanges.

In Homeric epics such as the Iliad and the Odyssey, the giving of gifts, such as weapons, garments, and livestock, was portrayed as a mark of honor and friendship. Greek city-states also exchanged ceremonial gifts during festivals and religious observances.

In the Achaemenid Empire, a complex system of gifting existed particularly inside the satrapy. Through public gift-giving, the king or satraps showed honour to subjects, stirred up competition, and created an obligation of loyalty. Xenophon in Cyropaedia says of Cyrus the Great, "He sent food around also to those in whom he was pleased... If he wished that any of his friends be courted by large numbers, he sent from his table to them as well. And still even now, all court more those to whom they see things sent from the table of the king, believing that they are the ones in honor... It seemed to him to be good to make clear the way he honored each because of this: Wherever human beings think that the one who is best will neither be heralded nor receive prizes, here it is clear that they are not competitively disposed toward each other. Yet wherever the best person is especially evident in getting the advantage, here all are also evident contending with the greatest enthusiasm." This public gifting of food, and other goods, created competition and helped legitimise the kings power. It also created an obligation for the recipient to return a counter-gift of greater value, and so kings would give gifts of such great value that the recipient could not meet their obligation and was thus forced into loyalty.

=== Medieval ===
During the Middle Ages in Europe, gift-giving was closely tied to feudal obligations, religious observances, and courtly traditions. Nobles presented gifts to their monarchs as a sign of loyalty, while monarchs rewarded their vassals with land and titles. The Christian Church promoted charitable giving, especially during religious festivals such as Christmas and Easter, which later influenced the development of holiday gifting traditions. In Islamic cultures, gift-giving (hiba) was also significant, both as a religious act and as a practice in hospitality. The Qur'an and Hadith literature encourage believers to give generously to others, particularly the needy and travelers. In the 760s, Bregowin (archbishop of Canterbury) gave a bone casket to Lul (the bishop of Mainz). This was the only known instance of gift-giving between 8th-century missionaries. Donations to monasteries in medieval Europe peaked between the 9th and 12th centuries. Eventually, people began to explain this by claiming that monks or other holy people contributed disproportionately to a "treasure of merit". By the Renaissance and early modern era, gift-giving in Europe expanded among the merchant and upper classes. The rise of personal letters and tokens, including jewelry and manuscripts, became popular among the literate elite. In royal courts, the exchange of luxury gifts was part of diplomatic protocol.

In China, Confucian teachings emphasized the importance of li (ritual propriety), which included the appropriate giving and receiving of gifts. Elaborate ceremonies and strict etiquette governed imperial gift exchanges and family rituals.

In sixteenth and seventeenth century France, gift-giving was often patronage in disguise. This was hidden by terms like grâces, bonté, and bienveillance. Sometimes actual gifts were given with patron-client letters. These often included money, hunting birds, food, and cloth, and occasionally messengers as well.

=== Modern ===
The Industrial Revolution significantly transformed gift-giving by introducing mass production and consumer goods. With increased accessibility and affordability, gift-giving became more widespread across socioeconomic classes. The emergence of department stores and catalogs in the 19th century, especially in Western Europe and North America, facilitated the commercial aspect of gifting.

Holiday gift-giving became institutionalized with events such as Christmas, Valentine's Day, and Mother's Day. Influenced by Victorian customs and Christian traditions, Christmas became a major gift-exchange occasion, particularly in the United Kingdom and the United States.

Gift-giving during Christmas celebrations in the U.S. began in the early 19th century, initially in the Mid-Atlantic region. This kind of celebration was Northern European and had its roots in Lutheran theology. During this era, gifts were usually small and handmade.

In the late 19th century, U.S. Christmas celebrations began to grow in scale, with more manufacturing of goods. As early as 1880, the country's businesspeople had begun taking advantage of the holiday to sell more.

In Japan, Valentine's Day gift giving was introduced by Morozoff Ltd. in 1936, and initially targeted foreigners living near Kobe. The holiday was then reintroduced in the 1950s, but was not popular. It only became popular in the 1970s, when it was framed as a time for women to give gifts to men. To fix the gender imbalance, White Day was introduced for the men to give back to women. The typical gift on Valentine's Day in Japan is giri choko ("obligation chocolate"). Typical gifts on White Day include chocolate, jewelry, and clothes.

In the 20th and 21st centuries, globalized commerce, advertising, and cultural exchange have further diversified gift-giving practices. The expansion of e-commerce and digital platforms has introduced new forms of gifting, such as electronic gift cards and subscription services.

== Presentation ==
In many cultures gifts are traditionally packaged in some way. For example, in Western cultures, gifts are often wrapped in wrapping paper and accompanied by a gift note which may note the occasion, the recipient's name and the giver's name. In Chinese culture, red wrapping connotes luck. Although inexpensive gifts are common among colleagues, associates and acquaintances, expensive or amorous gifts are considered more appropriate among close friends, romantic interests or relatives.

== Gift-giving occasions ==
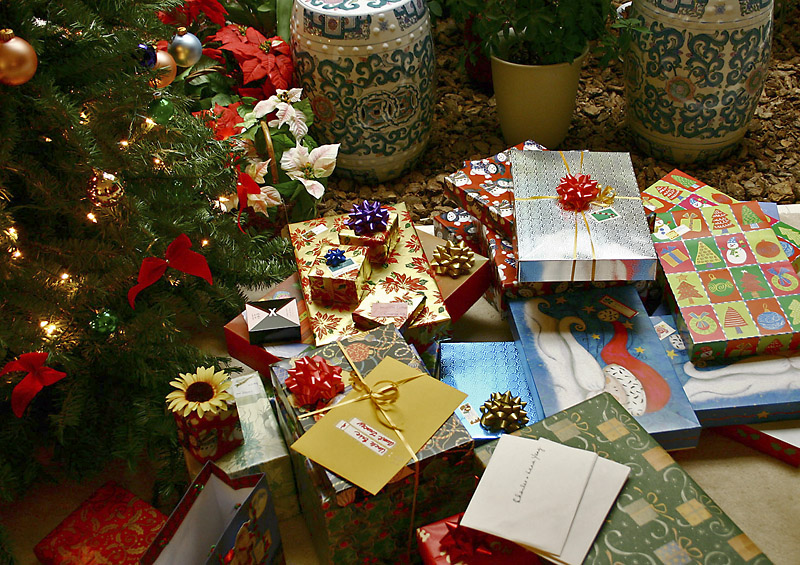
Gifts under a Christmas tree

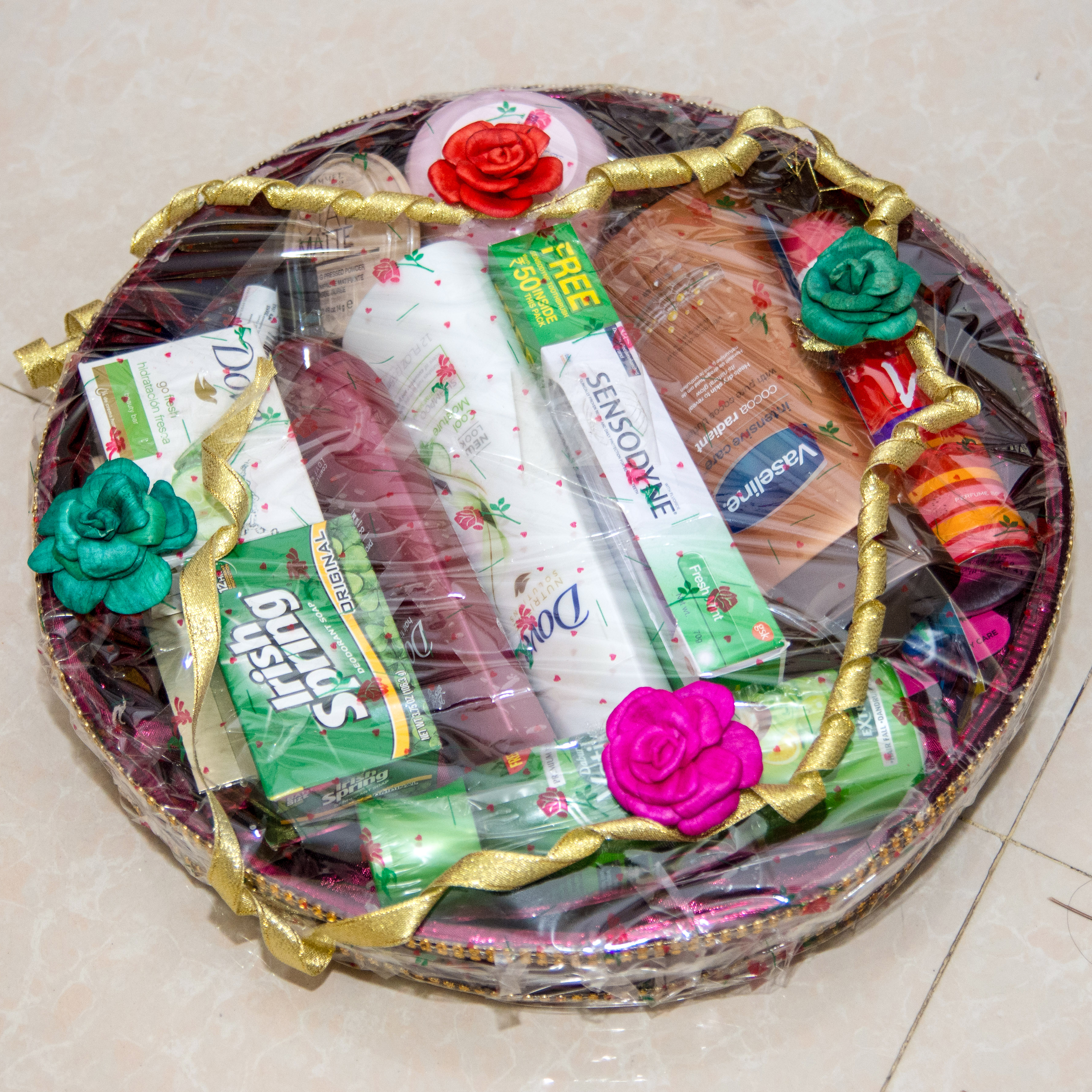
Modern engagement gifts basket in Bangladesh.

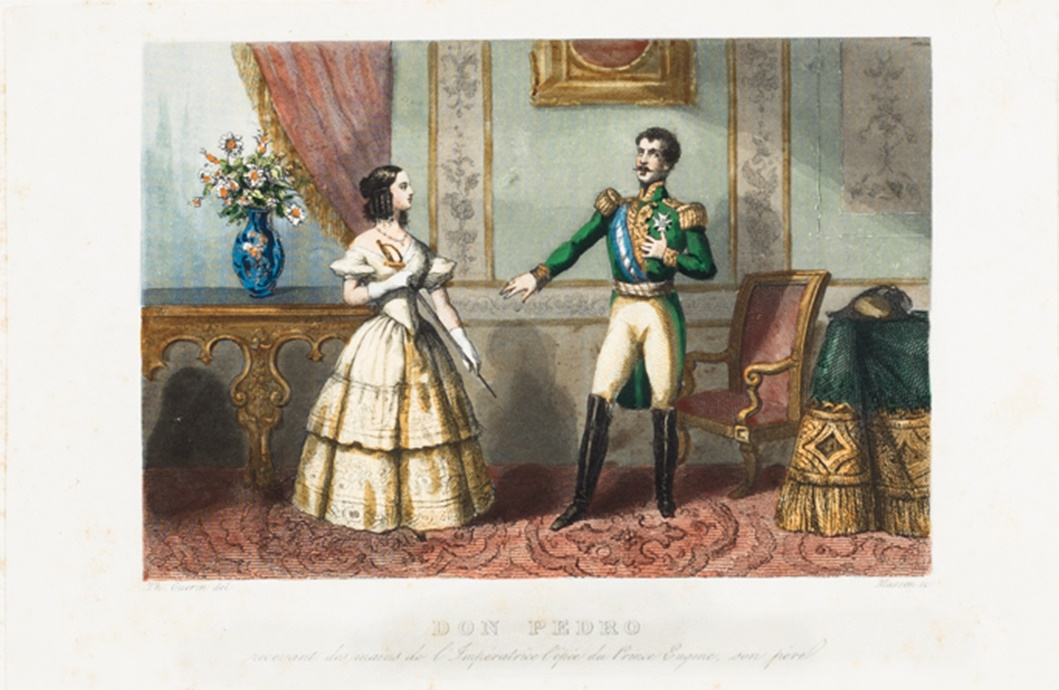
Emperor Pedro I of Brazil receiving a sword as a gift from his wife, Amélie of Leuchtenberg. The weapon had belonged to her father, Eugène de Beauharnais, Viceroy of Italy and stepson of Napoleon Bonaparte.

Gift-giving occasions may be:

- An expression of love or friendship
- An expression of gratitude for a gift received.
- An expression of piety, in the form of charity.
- An expression of solidarity, in the form of mutual aid.
- To share wealth.
- To offset misfortune.
- Offering travel souvenirs.
- Custom, on occasions (often celebrations) such as
  - A birthday (the person who has his or her birthday gives cake, etc. and/or receives gifts).
  - A potlatch, in societies where status is associated with gift-giving rather than acquisition.
  - Christmas (throughout the history of Christmas gift giving, people have given one another gifts, often pretending they are left by Santa Claus, the Christ Child or Saint Nicholas).
  - Feast of Saint Nicholas (people give each other gifts, often supposedly receiving them from Saint Nicholas).
  - Easter baskets with chocolate eggs, jelly beans, and chocolate rabbits are gifts given on Easter.
  - Greek Orthodox Christians in Greece, will give gifts to family and friends on the Feast of Saint Basil.
  - Muslims give gifts to family and friends, known as eidiyah (in Arabic-speaking countries) or eidi (in Iran and South Asia), on Eid al-Fitr (the end of Ramadan) and on Eid al-Adha.
  - American Jews give Hanukkah gifts to family and friends.
  - Hindus give Diwali and Pongal gifts to family and friends. Rakhi or Raksha Bandhan is another occasion where brothers give gifts to sisters.
  - Buddhists give Vesak gifts to family and friends.
  - Gifts are given to among African American families and friends on Kwanzaa.
  - A wedding (the couple receives gifts and gives food and/or drinks at the wedding reception).
  - A wedding anniversary (each spouse receives gifts).
  - A funeral (visitors bring flowers, the relatives of the deceased give food and/or drinks after the ceremonial part).
  - A birth (the baby receives gifts, or the mother receives a gift from the father known as a push present).
  - Passing an examination (the student receives gifts).
  - Father's Day (the father receives gifts).
  - Mother's Day (the mother receives gifts).
  - Siblings Day (the sibling receives gifts)
  - The exchange of gifts between a guest and a host, is often a traditional practice.
  - Lagniappe
  - Retirement Gifts
  - Congratulations Gifts
  - Engagement Gifts
  - Housewarming party Gifts
  - Women's day Gifts
  - Valentine's Day

== Promotional gifts ==
Promotional gifts differ from regular gifts. Recipients may include employees or clients. These gifts are primarily used for advertising. They help promote the brand name and increase its awareness. In promotional gifting, the quality and presentation of the gifts are more important than the gifts themselves, as they serve as a gateway to acquire new clients or associates.

== As reinforcement and manipulation ==
Giving a gift to someone is not necessarily just an altruistic act. It may be given in the hope that the receiver reciprocates in a particular way. It may take the form of positive reinforcement as a reward for compliance, possibly for an underhand manipulative and abusive purpose.

== Unwanted gifts ==
Giving the appropriate gift that aligns with the recipient's preferences poses a formidable challenge. Gift givers commonly err in the process of gift selection, either by offering gifts that the recipients' do not wish to receive or by failing to provide gifts that recipients earnestly desired. For example, givers avoid giving the same gifts more than once while recipients are more open to receiving a repeated gift, givers prefer to avoid giving self-improvement products (e.g., self-help books) as gifts while recipients are more open to receiving such gifts, when choosing between giving digital and physical gift cards, givers opt for the latter more often than recipients want, and many receivers prefer a future experience instead of an object, or a practical gift that they have requested over a more expensive, showier gift chosen by the giver. One cause of the mismatch between the giver's and receiver's view is that the giver is focused on the act of giving the gift, while the receiver is more interested in the long-term utilitarian value of the gift.

Due to the mismatch between givers' and recipients' gift preferences, a significant fraction of gifts are unwanted, or the giver pays more for the item than the recipient values it, resulting in a misallocation of economic resources known as a deadweight loss. Unwanted gifts are often "regifted", donated to charity, or thrown away. A gift that actually imposes a burden on the recipient, either due to maintenance or storage or disposal costs, is known as a white elephant.

One means of reducing the mismatch between the buyer and receivers' tastes is advance coordination, often undertaken in the form of a wedding registry or Christmas list. Wedding registries in particular are often kept at a single store, which can designate the exact items to be purchased (resulting in matching housewares), and to coordinate purchases so the same gift is not purchased by different guests. One study found that wedding guests who departed from the registry typically did so because they wished to signal a closer relationship to the couple by personalizing a gift, and also found that as a result of not abiding by the recipients' preferences, their gifts were appreciated less often.

An estimated $3.4 billion was spent on unwanted Christmas gifts in the United States in 2017 and $10.1 billion in 2024 .The day after Christmas is typically the busiest day for returns in countries with large Christmas gift giving traditions. The total unredeemed value of gift cards purchased in the U.S. each year is estimated to be about a billion dollars.

In some cases, people know the preferences of recipients very well, and can give highly valued gifts. Some value in gift-giving comes from assisted preference discovery - people receiving gifts they did not know they would like, or which they did not know were available. Behavioral economists propose that the non-material value of gifts lies in strengthening relationships by signalling the giver was thoughtful, or spent time and effort on the gift.

== Legal aspects ==
At common law, for a gift to have legal effect, it was required that there be (1) intent by the donor to give a gift, and (2) delivery to the recipient of the item to be given as a gift.

In some countries, certain types of gifts above a certain monetary amount are subject to taxation. For the United States, see Gift tax in the United States.

In some contexts, gift giving can be construed as bribery. This tends to occur in situations where the gift is given with an implicit or explicit agreement between the giver of the gift and its receiver that some type of service will be rendered (often outside of normal legitimate methods) because of the gift. Some groups, such as government workers, may have strict rules concerning gift giving and receiving so as to avoid the appearance of impropriety.

Cross border monetary gifts are subject to taxation in both source and destination countries based on the treaty between the two countries.

== Religious views ==
Lewis Hyde claims in The Gift that Christianity considers the Incarnation and subsequent death of Jesus to be the greatest gift to humankind, and that the Jataka contains a tale of the Buddha in his incarnation as the Wise Hare giving the ultimate alms by offering himself up as a meal for Sakka. (Hyde, 1983, 58–60)

In the Eastern Orthodox Church, the bread and wine that are consecrated during the Divine Liturgy are referred to as "the Gifts." They are first of all the gifts of the community (both individually and corporately) to God, and then, after the epiklesis, the Gifts of the Body and Blood of Christ to the Church.

Ritual sacrifices can be seen as return gifts to a deity.

== See also ==
- Alms
- Altruism
- Atonement
- Charity (practice)
- Christmas gift
- Debt relief
- Diplomatic gift
- Gift economy
- Gift (law)
- Gift tax
- Gift wrapping
- Giving circles
- Green gifting
- Omiyage
- Pasalubong
- Random act of kindness
- Red packet
- Regiving
- Xenia (Greek)
