= Jogakbo =

Traditional Korean patchwork technique

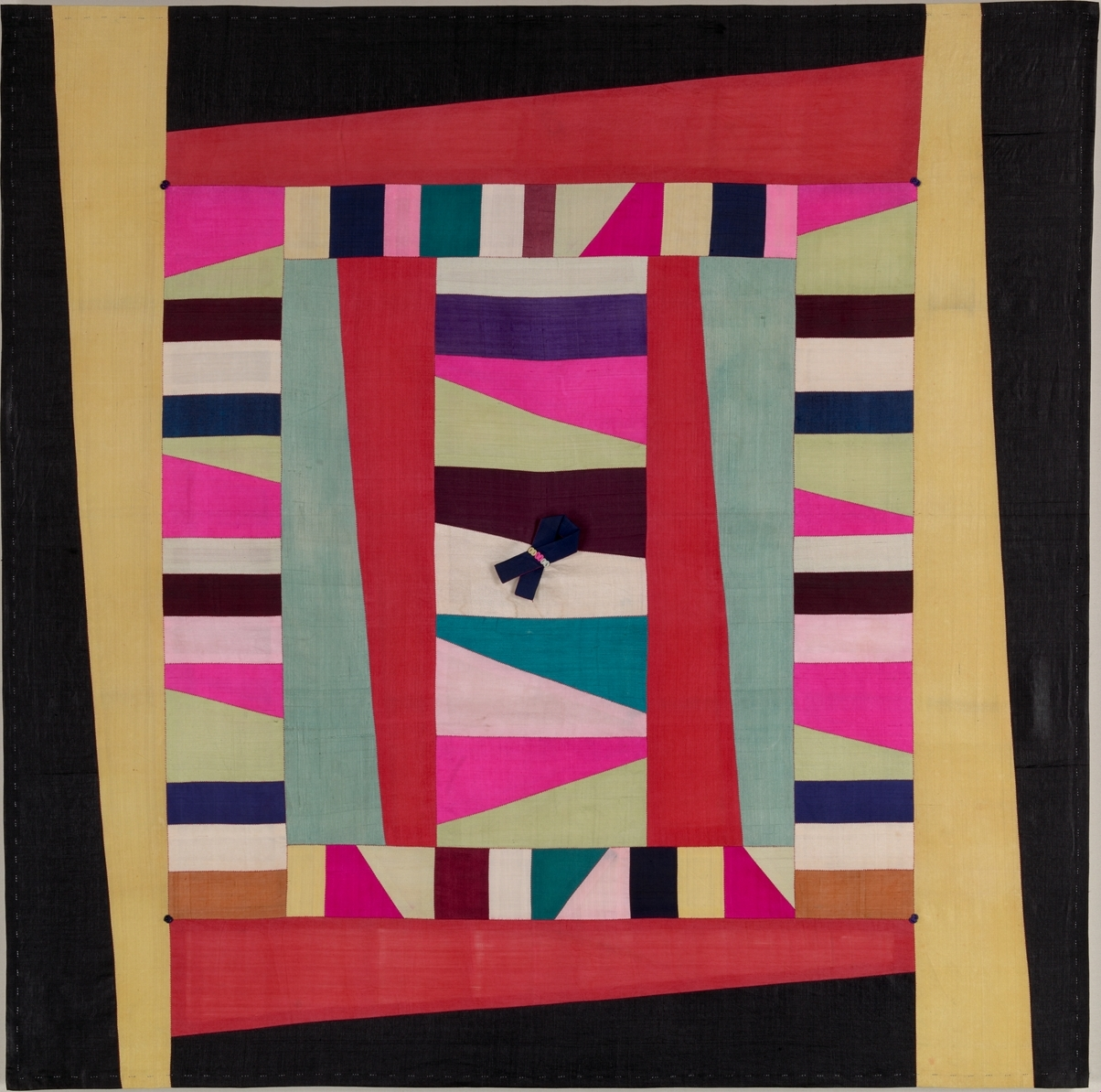
Jogakbo in the Metropolitan Museum of Art

Jogakbo (Korean: 조각보) is a traditional Korean textile craft that pieces together small scraps of colorful fabric to create a bojagi (wrapping cloth). It was made primarily by women during the Joseon dynasty and has been reinterpreted in various forms of contemporary art.

== Characteristics ==
The fabric scraps used in jogakbo are typically of a single material such as cotton, silk, ramie, hemp or paper. The pieces are joined using a triple-stitch technique called kkaekki (깨끼). Jogakbo is expanded in a irregular and spontaneous manner until the desired size is achieved. It may feature multiple colors or a single color. Color schemes frequently draw on the obangsaek (five directional colors: blue, red, yellow, white, and black) and ogansaek (five intermediate colors). Red and blue were the most frequently used colors as red was believed to ward off evil spirits while blue symbolized life.

=== Types ===
A 2011 study identified five types of jogakbo based on their pattern.

- Square type: The fabric pieces are square-shaped or isosceles triangles that form a square.
- Radial type: A small square at the center gradually expands outward.
- Cintamani motif type: A pattern created by regularly overlapping circles of the same size at four points.
- Vertical and horizontal types: The vertical type consists of rectangles repeatedly arranged at varying intervals along vertical lines that serve as structural axes. The horizontal type consists of squares and rectangles of various sizes arranged horizontally to create a balanced composition.
- Free-form type: No fixed form.

== History ==
Unlike gungbo (palace bojagi) made from a single piece of fabric, minbo (commoner bojagi) took the form of jogakbo. It was primarily made by women during the Joseon dynasty using leftover fabric, reflecting the value of frugality. As a household craft that allowed for a wide variety of color and shape combinations, jogakbo provided a creative outlet for women to express their artistic sensibility. Also, joining pieces of fabric together symbolized continuing good fortune. Jogakbo was used not only for temporarily storing or carrying objects but also as covers, mats, decorative items, and for religious purposes. Today, it is used as stationery, interior design, and fashion accessories.

The history of jogakbo dates back more than 600 years. The oldest surviving jogakbo, housed at Naesosa, was made in 1415 and is presumed to have been used as a cover for a Buddhist sutra. Three pieces of jogakbo enshrined inside a Vairocana statue at Haeinsa were made in 1490 and are also considered as one of the oldest surviving examples.

== Modern interpretation ==
=== Aesthetic analysis ===
A 2004 study wrote that jogakbo has natural beauty and apotropaic aesthetics characteristic of Korean clothing.

Jogakbo has been compared to works of modern art. The arrangement of colors in Kim Whanki’s 1938 painting Rondo has been noted for its resemblance to that of jogakbo. Huh Dong-hwa, the director of the Museum of Korean Embroidery, compared it to geometric works by Piet Mondrian and Paul Klee.

=== Mathematical analysis ===
As jogakbo is pieced together from square, rectangular, or triangular pieces of fabric, it has been compared to tessellation. A 2011 study asserted that some types of jogakbo follow mathematical equations: the width of saekdongbo follows the arithmetic sequence $a_n = a + d(n-1)$ while the spacing and area in mosi-jogakbo grow geometrically according to $a_n = ar^{n-1}$.

== In contemporary art ==
Interest in bojagi increased after the 1983 exhibition at the National Folk Museum of Korea by Huh Dong-hwa, which subsequently inspired contemporary textile artists to create works based on the craft. Textile artist Chunghie Lee made hanbok and shoes in jogakbo style while fashion designer Lie Sang Bong designed a dress inspired by it. In his 2008 work Baked Painting-Jogakbo (구운 그림-조각보), ceramicist Shin Sang-ho reinterpreted the composition of jogakbo in ceramic form.

== Gallery ==
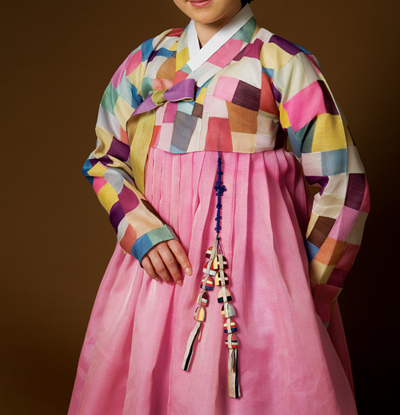
A jeogori (top) made with the jogakbo technique

== See also ==
- Tessellation
- Chinese patchwork
- Boro (textile)
