= Green gifting =

Environmentally friendly gift giving

Green gifting is an emerging trend that results in a lower environmental impact as well as a lower impact on personal budgets from the gift giving process. It began with the idea of recycling the packaging around a gift and has expanded into the mindset that presents themselves can be chosen or created for the purpose of recycling or lowering their environmental and budgetary impact.

== Description ==
The concept of re-gifting has traditionally been frowned upon. Because of this, one of the most important steps for successful green gifting is for the host to indicate that green gifting is not only approved, but preferred. An event that features green gifting encourages those invited to practice the level of green gifting the giver is comfortable with:

1. Re-gift a never used or gently used item.
2. Use recycled wrapping paper, bows or gift bags.
3. Substitute newspaper or cloth for wrapping paper. Two examples of traditional cloth wrappings are furoshiki and bojagi.
4. Create a present by hand.
5. Give a pass or membership to a local zoo, museum, or state and national park.

== See also ==
- Regifting
- Red envelope
- Ethical consumerism
- Experiential gifts
- Alternative giving
- International Star Registry
