= Push present =

Gift to mark the occasion of giving birth to a child

A push present (also called a push gift or a baby bauble) is a present a father gives to the mother to mark the occasion of her giving birth to their child. In practice the present may be given before or after the birth, or even in the delivery room. The giving of push presents has supposedly grown in the United States in recent years. However, it is at the discretion of the partner or father.

== Possible origins ==
"The exact origin of push presents or baby baubles is hard to pinpoint. Some believe this tradition hails back to several hundred years ago, stemming from places such as the UK, India, and Egypt, symbolizing fertility, strength, and the preciousness of new life. Jewelry is thought to have been the most customary gift. These lovely gestures of appreciation were given to the mother to acknowledge and commemorate the effort that went into such a momentous occasion."

"Whether old or new, the practice seems to have gained a renewed popularity in the United States over the last few decades and has evolved beyond just jewelry. These gifts have become a cherished way for partners, family members, and friends to express their love and gratitude to the expectant parent for their incredible journey and sacrifices".

Until recently it was passed on largely by word of mouth or peer pressure among both mothers and fathers. Though "push present" is a recent term, a gift of jewelry to a new mother has been practiced throughout different cultures and time periods. For example, Napoleon gave the Napoleon Diamond Necklace to his wife Marie Louise upon the birth of their son in 1811.

According to Linda Murray, the executive editor of BabyCenter, "It's an expectation of moms these days that they deserve something for bearing the burden for nine months, getting sick, ruining their body." Other sources trace the development of the present to the increased assertiveness of women, allowing them to ask for a present more directly, or the increased involvement of the men in pregnancy, making them more informed of the pain and difficulty of pregnancy and labor.

== Frequency ==
A 2004 survey of over 30,000 respondents by BabyCenter found that 38% of new mothers received a push present, and 55% of pregnant mothers wanted one, though fewer thought it was actually expected. About 40% of both groups said the baby itself was already a present and did not wish an additional reward. A survey of Today viewers in 2015 found that 45% were opposed to the custom, 28% in support, and 26% did not know what "push present" referred to.

The popularity of push presents has been attributed in part to media coverage of celebrities receiving them. Examples include a 10 carat diamond ring given to celebrity stylist Rachel Zoe by her husband Rodger after the 2011 birth of their son, a Bentley given to reality TV star Peggy Tanous of The Real Housewives of Orange County by her husband Micah after the 2007 birth of their daughter, and a diamond and sapphire necklace given to singer Mariah Carey by her husband Nick Cannon after the 2011 birth of their twins.

Some couples would prefer increased help in chores or baby care, or save the money for the child's education.

According to etiquette expert Pamela Holland, there are no set guidelines for push presents. "The standard is that there is no standard," she said. "It does make sense to have etiquette around wedding or baby shower gifts because you're inviting other people into it. But this is far too intimate to have a rule." In general it is the woman who lets her man know about push presents, not the other way around, although there can be peer pressure from friends to buy one on either the man or the woman.

== See also ==
- desco da parto or birth tray
- Baby shower
