= Bojagi =

Traditional Korean wrapping cloth

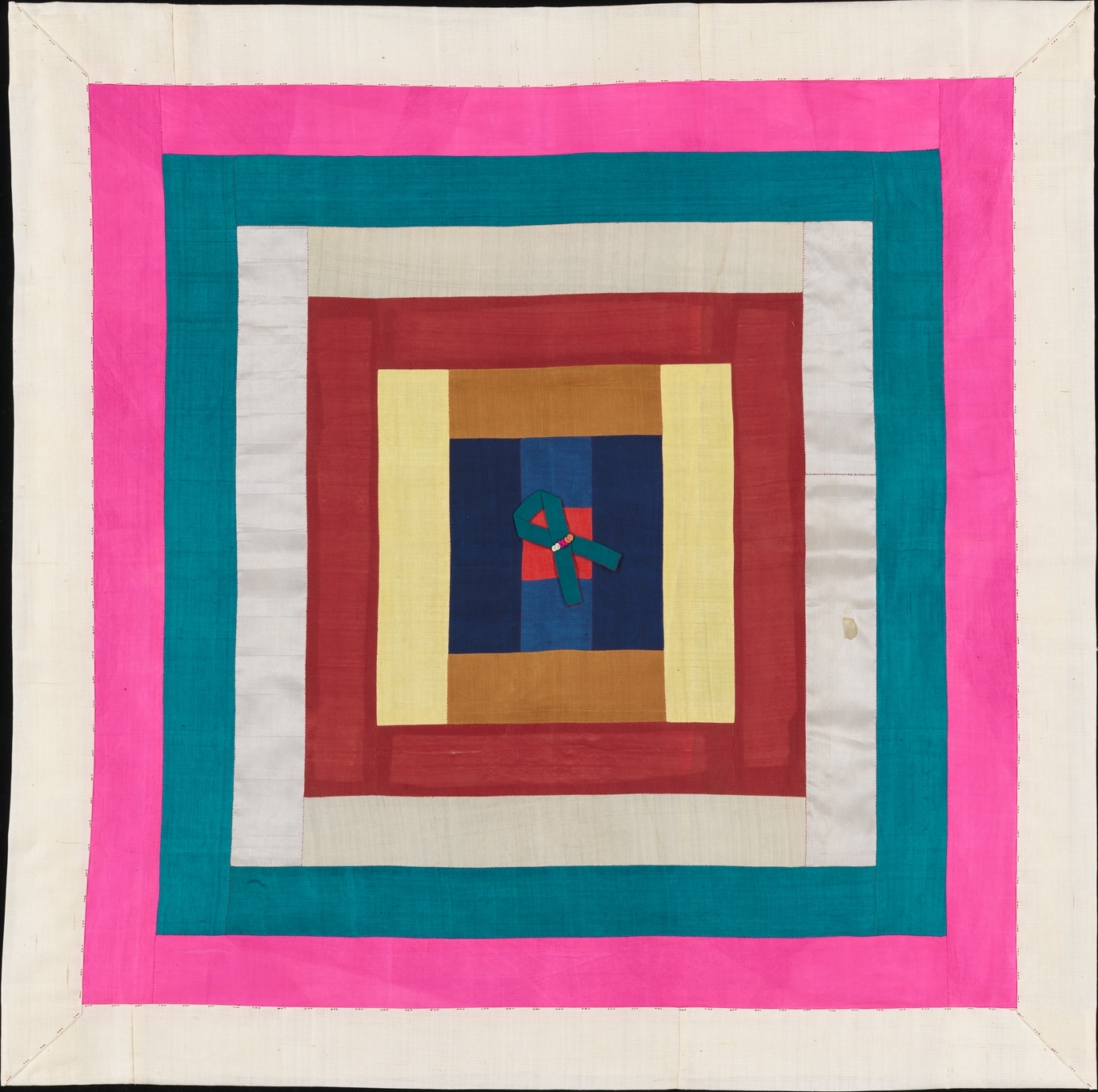
- Silk patchwork bojagi from the collection of the Metropolitan Museum of Art

Korean name
- Hangul: 보자기
- Hanja: 褓자기
- RR: bojagi
- MR: pojagi

A bojagi (Korean: 보자기, sometimes shortened to 보; bo; po) is a traditional Korean wrapping cloth. Bojagi are typically square and can be made from a variety of materials, though silk or ramie are common. Embroidered bojagi are known as subo, while patchwork or scrap bojagi are known as jogakbo.

Bojagi have many uses, including as gift wrapping, in weddings, and in Buddhist rites. More recently, they have been recognized as a traditional art form, often featured in museums and inspiring modern reinterpretations.

== History ==
Traditional Korean folk religions believed that keeping something wrapped and protected meant good luck. It is believed that the earliest use of the wrappings dates to the Three Kingdoms period, but no examples survive from this period.

The earliest surviving examples, from the early Joseon dynasty (1392–1910), were used in a Buddhist context, as tablecloths or coverings for sutras. The cloths particularly marked special events, such as weddings or betrothals, where the use of a new cloth was believed to convey "an individual's concern for that which was being wrapped, as well as respect for its recipient." For a royal wedding, up to 1,650 bojagi might be created.

Everyday use of bojagi declined in the 1950s, and they were not treated by Koreans as art objects until the late 1960s. Since the 1980s, many exhibitions have been organized in Korea and around the world to showcase the beauty and significance of bojagi made by Korean women. In 1997, the "Korean Beauty" postage stamp series included four stamps featuring bojagi.

Traditionally, bojagi have been made by hand, but more recently manufacturing has occasionally been done by machine.

== Physical characteristics ==
Traditionally, the bojagi is a square, measuring from one pok in width (approximately 35 cm), for small items, to ten pok for larger objects such as bedding. Materials included silk, cotton, ramie, and hemp. Colors ranged from red, purple, blue, green, yellow, and pink to dark blue, white, and black. Bojagi were sometimes embellished to be lined, unlined, padded, quilted, or decorated with painting, paper-thin gold sheets, embroidery, and patchwork.

== Royal bojagi (gung-bo) ==
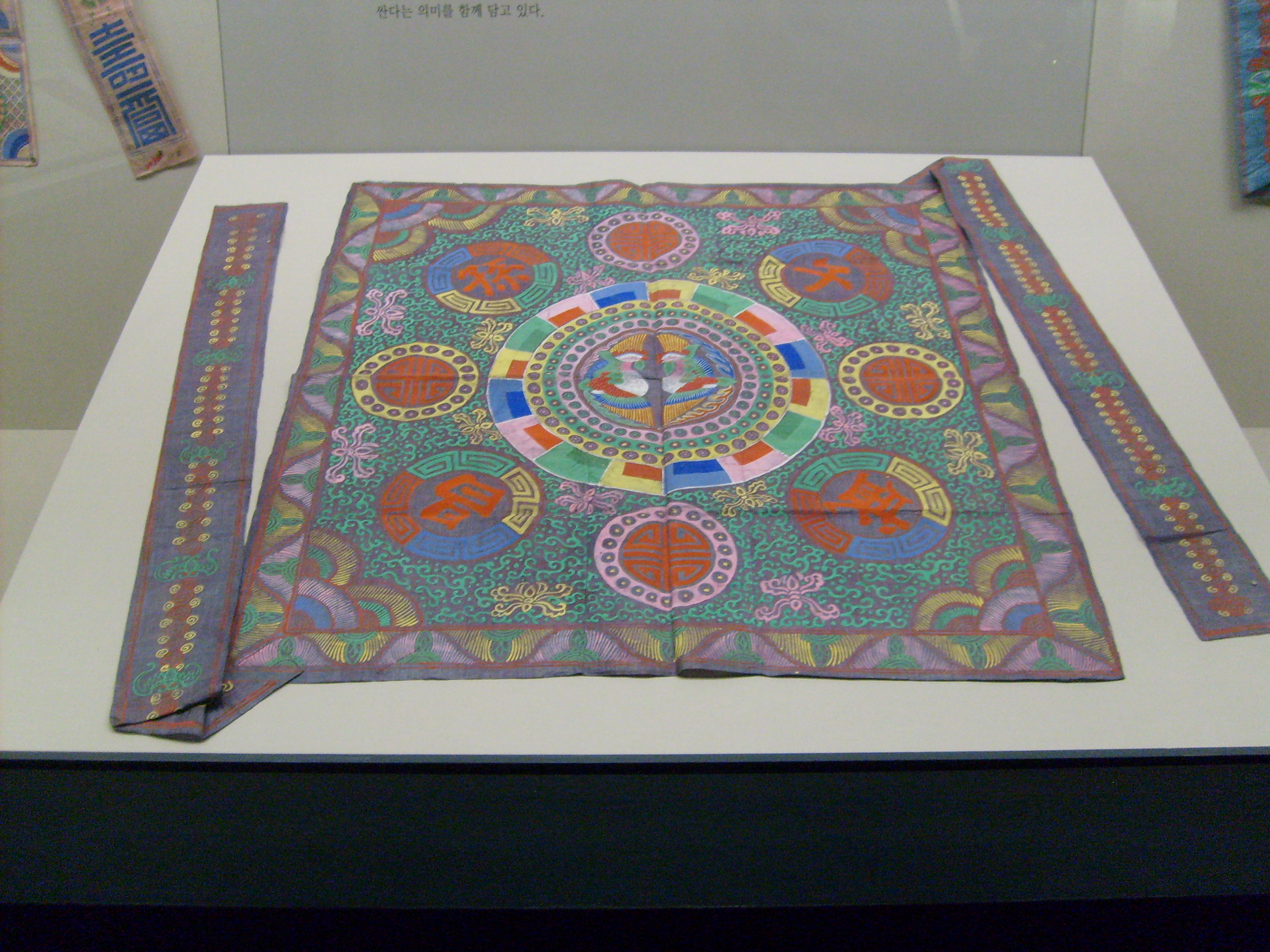
Non-patchwork royal bojagi

Royal wrapping cloths were known as gung-bo. Gung-bo were made from a single piece of cloth, and although left unsigned, gung-bo cloths were made by known artisans and painters of court offices, distinct from the min-bo bojagi made by anonymous, unknown artists. Within the Joseon royal court the preferred fabric in bojagi construction was domestically produced pink-red to purple cloth. These fabrics were often painted with designs, such as dragons.

Unlike the used and re-used frugality of non-royal wrapping cloths, hundreds of new bojagi were commissioned on special occasions such as royal birthdays and New Year's Day. The names of women employed by the court to make bojagi for specific royal rituals, such as wedding ceremonies, are listed in official court records of the Uigwe (Royal Protocols). Several female needleworkers' names appear repeatedly in these records, pointing to the value of their high level of skill. In the eighteenth century, female needleworkers' wages appear to have been comparable to those of male artisans.

== Common bojagi (min-bo or jogakbo) ==
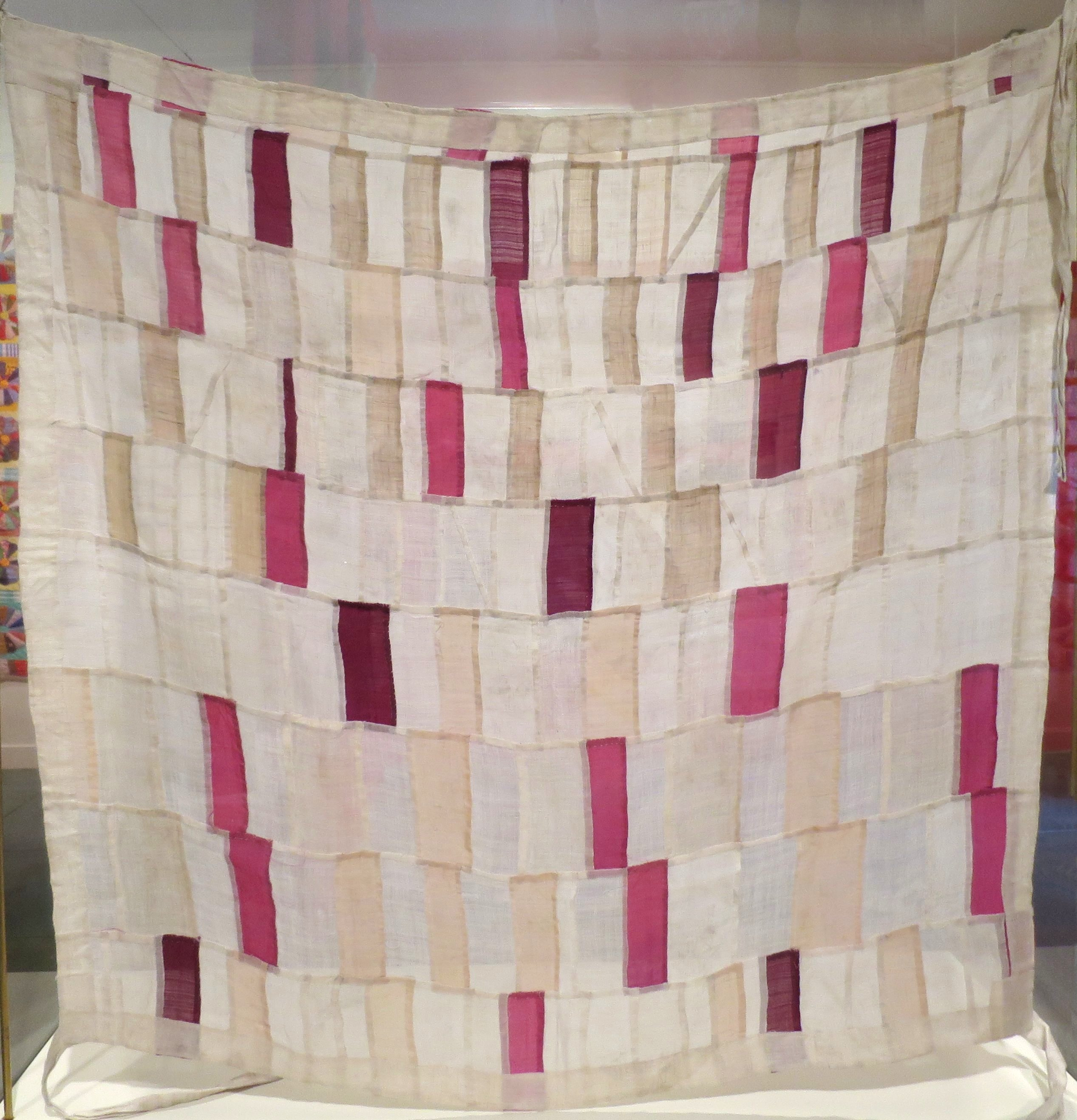
Bojagi from the collection of the Honolulu Museum of Art

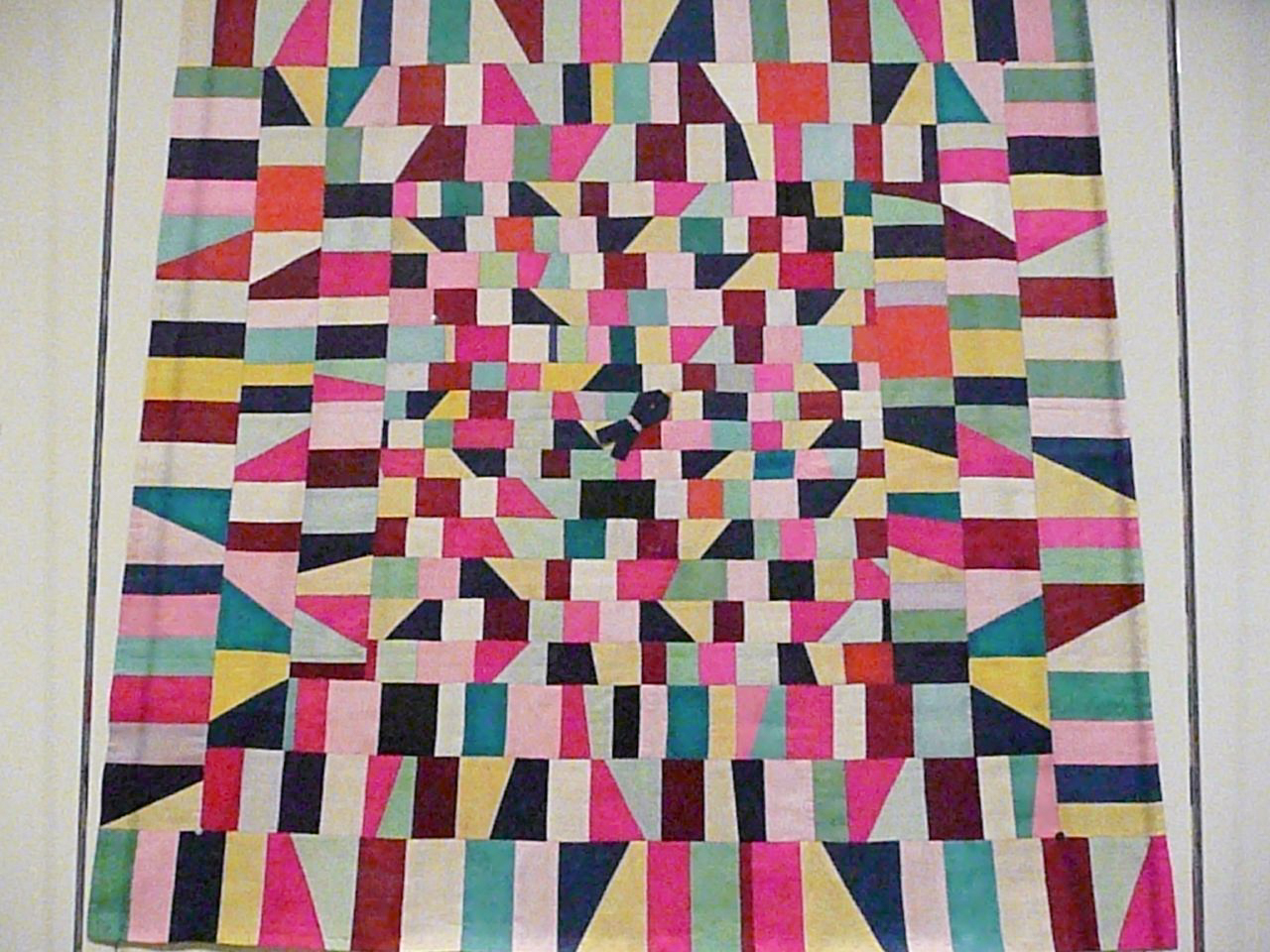
Silk patchwork bojagi from the collection of the Asian Art Museum of San Francisco

Min-bo or jogakbo (조각보) were "patchwork" bojagi made by commoners. In contrast with the royal gung-bo, which were not patchwork, these cloths were created from small segments (jogak) of fabric from other sewing, such as those left over from cutting the curves in traditional hanbok clothing.

Korean women, taught from an early age to be patient and frugal, would separate small scraps of cloth into different groups according to material, shape, colors, and weight. This process provided an opportunity for Joseon dynasty women to express their creative talents, with the actual sewing likely similar to sutra copying. Makers of this "patchwork" bojagi made no effort to hide their stitches and may have believed that blessings and good fortune (pok) accumulated with each added stitch and piece. Both symmetrical 'regular' and random-seeming 'irregular' patterned cloths were sewn, with styles presumably selected by an individual woman's aesthetic tastes.

=== As food coverings ===
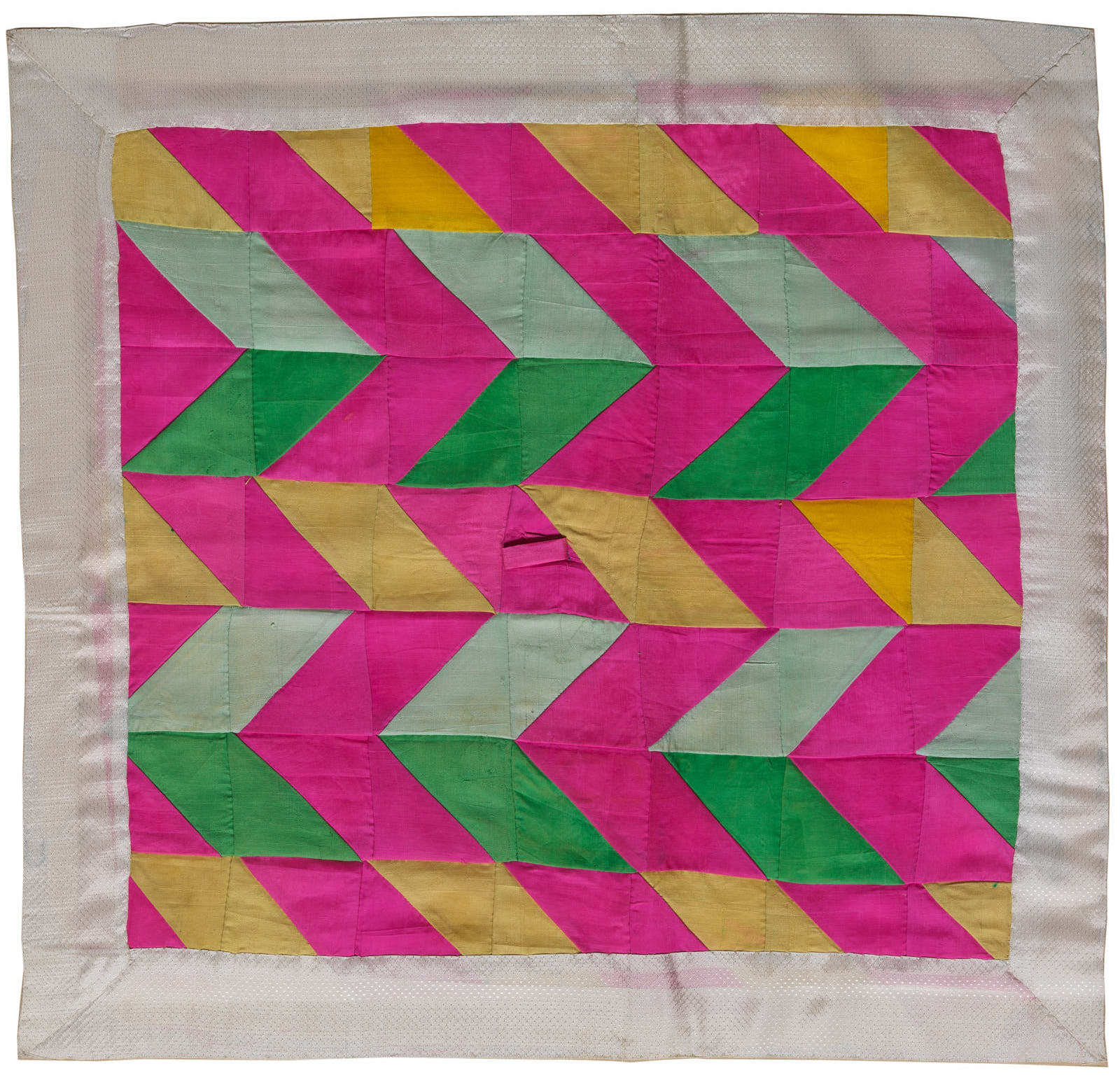
Bojagi from the Cotsen Textile Traces Study Collection

Jogakbo are closely associated with food coverings. The mid-19th century to early 20th century examples that have survived until the present day often have a small loop of ribbon attached in the centre of the square, to aid in lifting the cover away from food. Table-sized bojagi often have straps attached to the corners, so they can be fastened to the table, to secure items in place, when the table is moved.

Different bojagi were used for covering different foods and at different seasons. While lightweight cloths helped air to circulate during summer, to keep food warm in winter bojagi could be padded and lined as well. To prevent the bojagi from being dirtied from food, the underside is often lined with oiled paper.

=== For carrying items ===
Bojagi were used for transporting items, as well as covering, or keeping things together in storage. One such example is a 'knapsack' arrangement, where the cloth is wrapped and tied so that items can be securely transported upon ones' back.

=== Embroidered bojagi ===
Embroidered bojagi, also called subo (수보; prefix su meaning 'embroidery'), was another form of decorated cloth. A common ornament was that of stylized trees, varying in style from 'naive', to detailed depictions of flowers, fruits, birds, dragons, clouds and symbols of good luck. These cloths are closely associated with joyous occasions such as betrothals and weddings, used to wrap items such as gifts from the family of the bridegroom to the new bride, and the symbolic wooden wedding geese which is a metaphor of the groom's fidelity and protection.

The embroidery was done with spun thread, on a cotton or silk ground. The subo fabric was then lined, and possibly padded. Mothers of brides during the Joseon dynasty frequently stitched dozens of bojagi for their daughters to take to their new homes. Because many survive in pristine condition, these bojagi did not have a practical function, but served as signs of affection and good wishes.

==== Romantic connotations ====
Kirogi po, or wrapping cloths for a wedding goose, was another form of bojagi used to wrap a wooden goose presented by the bridegroom to the bride's family during traditional Korean wedding ceremonies, symbolizing the groom's fidelity. In addition to being lined and embroidered, the kirogi po were often decorated with strands of rainbow-colored threads representing rice stalks, a symbol of the family's wishes for abundance in married life. Trees, flowers, fruits, butterflies, and birds were commonly depicted to symbolize prosperity, honor, happiness, and joy.

== Modern references and exhibitions ==
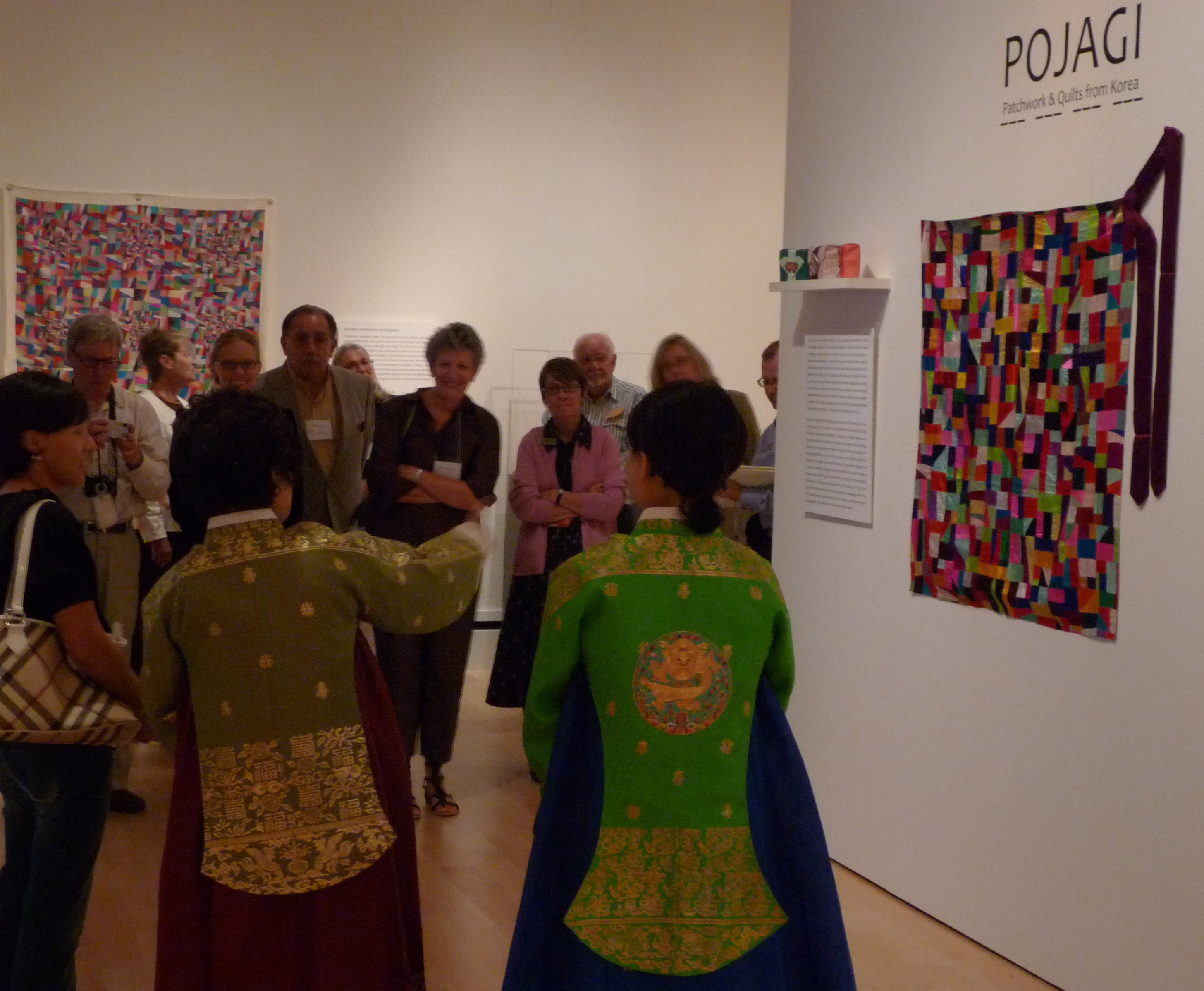
2008 exhibition of bojagi at the International Quilt Study Center & Museum

The Museum of Korean Embroidery in Seoul has a collection of 1,500 pieces of bojagi, with a particular focus on jogakbo (quilt-like patchworks). The museum was founded by husband-and-wife duo Dong-hwa Huh (허동화; 1926−2018) and Young-suk Park (박영숙; born 1932) with the aim of preserving Korean embroidery arts and educating the public on its artistic and historical significance. Huh and Park's bojagi collection garnered international attention, with sixty overseas exhibitions displayed in eleven countries.

In April 2018, Huh and Park donated the majority of their collection to the Seoul Museum of Craft Art.

The Seoul Museum of Craft Art is built on what was the Royal Craft Workshop of the Joseon dynasty, where court women created textile products made for everyday use. The museum made its grand opening in 2021 and is an open space where traditional and modern crafts come together.

Museum collections outside of Korea, including in Kyoto, London, San Francisco, and Los Angeles, also contain bojagi.

The patchwork style of the jogakbo has inspired artists working in other media, such as clothing designers Lee Chunghie and Karl Lagerfeld. The facade of the flagship store of French jeweler Cartier in Cheongdam-dong is also reportedly inspired by the craft. Japanese embroiderers have also worked in the style.

The patterns of jogakbo have been compared to the work of Paul Klee and Piet Mondrian.

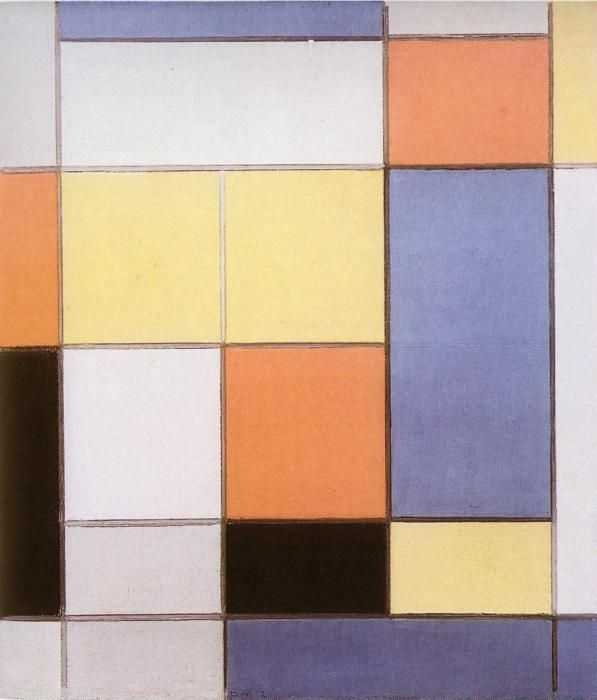
Work by Piet Mondrian, whose use of squares and color has been compared to bojagi

== See also ==
- Hanbok: traditional Korean clothing
- Furoshiki: Japanese wrapping cloth
- Chinese patchwork
