= Fukusa =

Traditional Japanese cloth

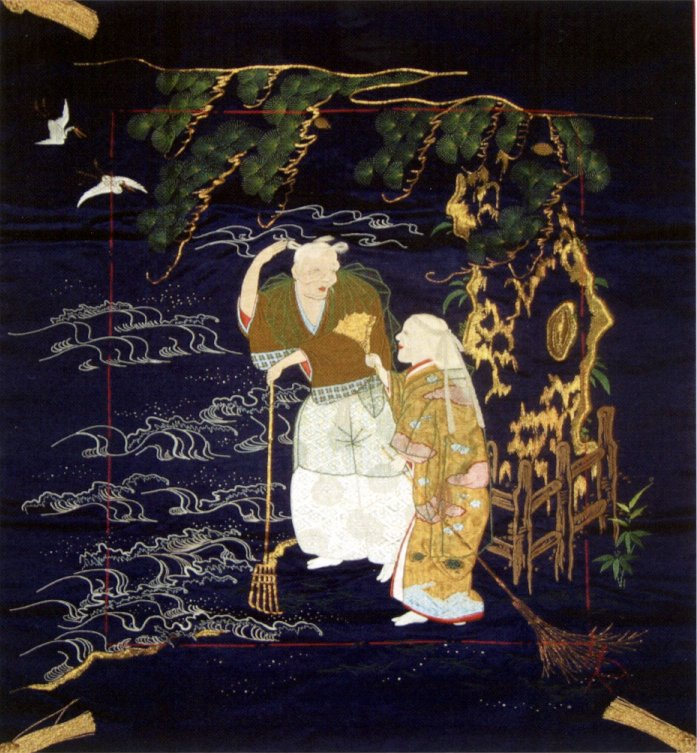
19th-century fukusa portraying Jō and Uba in a scene from the Noh play Takasago; embroidered silk and couched gold-wrapped thread on indigo-dyed shusa satin silk

Fukusa (袱紗; also written as 帛紗 and 服紗) are a type of Japanese textile used for gift-wrapping or for purifying equipment during a Japanese tea ceremony. Fukusa are square or almost square pieces of lined fabric ranging in size about 9–36 inches (230–910 mm) along one side. They are typically made of fine silk and may be decorated with embroidery in auspicious designs.

The use of fukusa as a way of presenting gifts has mostly died out, lingering instead mainly in certain ritual exchanges of gifts during weddings in a few regions of Japan.

== Use ==
Traditionally in Japan, gifts were placed in boxes or on a wooden or lacquered tray, over which a fukusa would be draped. The choice of a fukusa appropriate to the occasion was considered an important part of the gift itself, and part of its formality. The practice of covering a gift became widespread during the Edo period (1603–1867).

The scene or motifs depicted on fukusa are chosen to indicate either the occasion for which the gift is being given, or because they are appropriate for one of the annual festivals when gifts are exchanged. The richness of the decoration of the fukusa attests to the giver's wealth and aesthetics.

Once a gift was exchanged, after being admired, the fukusa and box or tray presented with the gift are typically returned to the gift's original giver. However, before the Meiji Restoration, when gifts were presented to a high official, the fukusa was not always returned. This was one of many subtle devices used to control the wealth of the aristocratic (daimyō) and samurai classes.

== History ==
The practice of covering a gift became widespread during the Edo period (1603–1867). In the Edo period, textiles, which had long been an integral part of Japanese art, were developed further through the rising wealth of the merchant classes, whose disposable income allowed them to imitate the upper classes through the patronage of textile artists, dyers and embroiderers. Unlike Western art, Japanese art did not arbitrarily divide between fine arts and decorative arts, and a number of eminent artists were commissioned to design textiles, including fukusa; however, artists seldom signed their work.

In the first part of the 18th century, the typical decoration of a fukusa reflected the tastes of the aristocracy. The subtle cultural references inherent in their designs would be recognizable only to the educated members of the upper classes, who lived and exchanged gifts in the cities of Kyoto and Edo (modern-day Tokyo) and their surrounding areas.

By the 19th century, the merchant classes of Japan had begun to move up the social ladder in terms of wealth and artistic influence, and adopted many customs of the aristocracy with their new-found wealth, including the custom of gift-giving with fukusa.

Today, fukusa are rarely used, and when they are it is almost exclusively around Tokyo and Kyoto for gifts given at the time of marriage.

== Decoration ==
Satin silk was the preferred fabric for embroidered fukusa, which often made extensive couched gold- and silver-wrapped thread. As paste-resist dyeing (yūzen) became popular, crepe silk (chirimen or kinsha) was favored. Tapestry-weave fabrics such as tsuzure-ori were also popular, as was the use of weft brocade (nishiki).

By the 19th century, family crests, or mon, were added on the lining side of the fukusa beginning in the late 18th century, and tassels were placed at each corner so that the fukusa could be picked up without touching the fabric.

=== Themes and motifs ===
- Nature: Nature motifs were common, particularly auspicious combinations such as the "Three Friends of Winter", a combination of pine, plum blossom and bamboo, considered to symbolise constancy and integrity.
- Auspicious birds and animals: Mandarin cranes (tsuru) and turtles with a trailing tail of algae (minogame) were used, representing longevity and good fortune. Since the Japanese word for red sea bream, tai, is part of the word medetai ("good luck"), and is also red - considered also to be auspicious - in colour, red sea breams were also used as a motif on fukusa, held to be good luck fish. Since the introduction of Chinese culture to Japan in the Asuka and Nara periods (7th-8th century), dragon and phoenix motifs, remaining close to the original Chinese style, were also considered to be auspicious, and were thus used on fukusa.
- Aristocratic culture: Legends such as The Tale of Genji and Noh plays were featured on fukusa. Bamboo curtains, screens, books, imperial carts, fans and other items reminiscent of the Heian period were used as auspicious designs from the Edo period. Games such as shell- and card-matching games (kai-awase) were also featured.
- Folktales and mythology: scenes or motifs from traditional Japanese folktales, such as Urashima Tarō and the Tale of Takasago, were used to decorate fukusa as a form of cultural reference.
- Local deities: for example, the Shichifukujin, an eclectic group of seven deities from Japan, India, and China, were sometimes used on fukusa.
- Chinese themes: both Confucian and Taoist motifs could be present on fukusa, such as the Seven Sages of the Bamboo Grove, a group of Chinese Taoist philosophers, who gathered in a bamboo grove to talk and drink.

== Fukusa in tea ceremony ==
Several variants of fukusa are also used in Japanese tea ceremony. Tea ceremony fukusa are always made of silk.

- Tsukai fukusa are usually undecorated squares of silk used to ritually purify tea utensils during a temae (tea-making procedure). Those used by men are usually deep purple, while those used by women are usually red or orange. Other colours are sometimes used, as are fukusa decorated with images.
- Dashi fukusa are larger squares of silk with various patterns used by hosts and guests to handle chawan (tea bowls) during certain temae, usually those involving the making of thick tea, in some tea traditions.
- Ko-bukusa are small squares of brocaded silk used by hosts and guests to handle chawan during certain temae, usually those involving the making of thick tea, in some schools of Japanese tea ceremony instead of dashi fukusa.

== See also ==
- Furoshiki
