= Furoshiki =

Traditional Japanese wrapping cloth

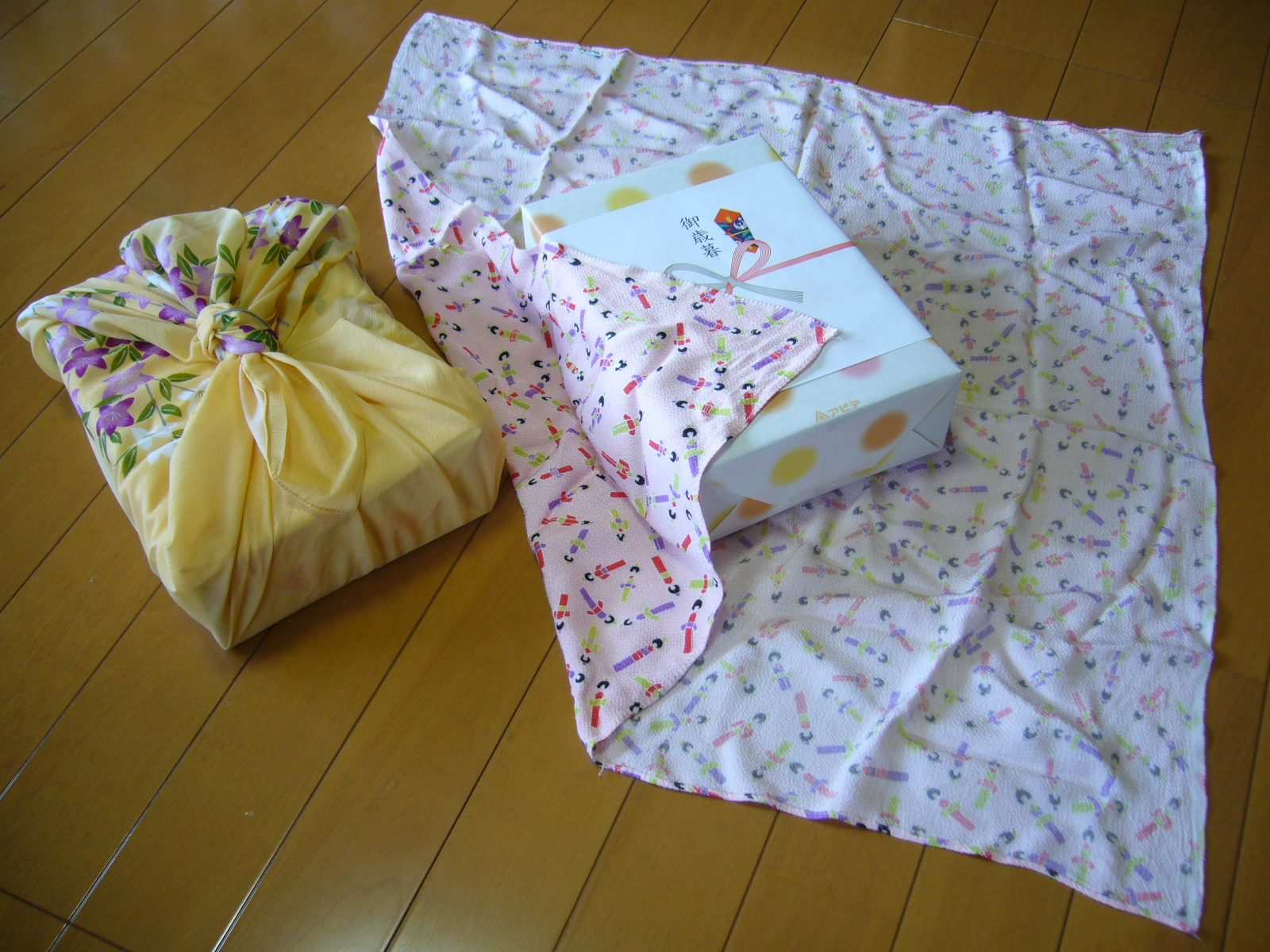
Modern furoshiki are popular as an environmentally-friendly alternative to wrapping paper.

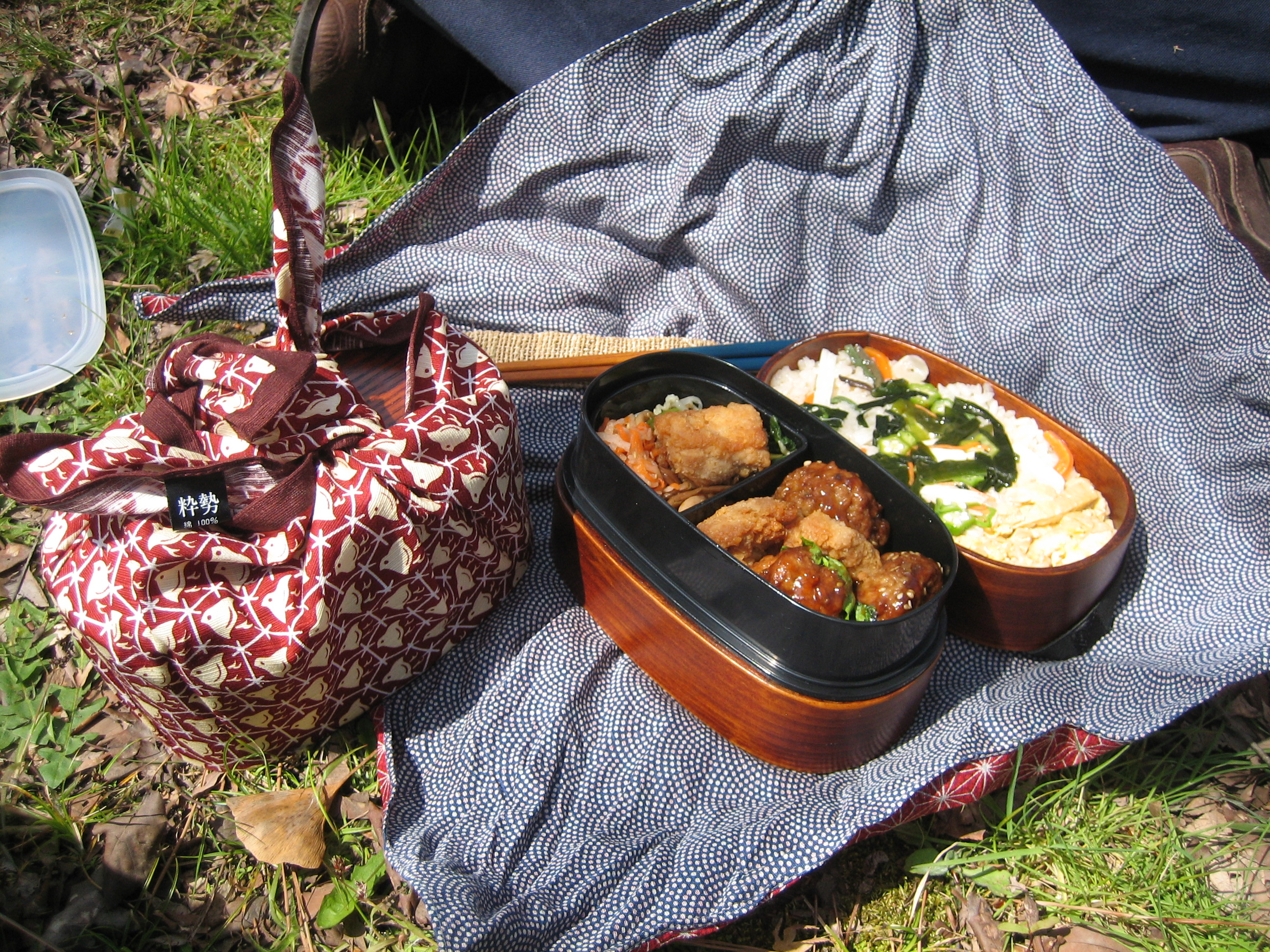
Two homemade bento boxes with furoshiki wrappings

Furoshiki (風呂敷) are traditional Japanese wrapping cloths traditionally used to wrap and/or transport goods. Consideration is placed on the aesthetics of furoshiki, which may feature hemmed edges, thicker and more expensive materials, and hand-painted designs; however, furoshiki are much less formal than fukusa, and are not generally used to present formal gifts.

While they come in a variety of sizes, they are typically almost square: the height is slightly greater than the width.

Traditional materials include silk or cotton, but modern furoshiki are available in synthetic materials like rayon, nylon, or polyester.

== History ==
The first furoshiki cloths were tsutsumi ("wrapping"), used during the Nara period from 710 to 794 AD as protection for precious temple objects. They became known as furoshiki during the Muromachi period. The term furoshiki (literally "bath spread", from furo (風呂, "bath"), and shiki (敷, "spread")) is said to have come about after high-ranking visitors to bathhouses packed their belongings in cloth decorated with their family crest.

They became popular in the Edo period with increased access to bathhouses by the general public; moreover, cloths with family crests grew in demand as common people gained the right to have family crests during the Meiji period.

Furoshiki usage declined in the post-war period, in large part due the proliferation of paper and plastic bags available to shoppers. In recent years, however, it has seen a renewed interest as environmental protection has become a greater concern. In 2006, Japanese Minister of the Environment, Yuriko Koike, showcased a specially designed furoshiki cloth to promote environmental awareness. In 2020, The Observer reported a growing interest in furoshiki in the UK, in part as a response to its perceived greater environmental sustainability compared to traditional single-use wrapping paper.

In a 2023 interview, a Kyoto manufacturer of furoshiki, founded in 1937 said that furoshiki are now used as bags or pillow cover in Japan.

== Material, size, pattern ==
Modern furoshiki may be made from fabrics of various thicknesses and price points, including silk, chirimen, cotton, rayon, and nylon. The cloth is typically square, although not a perfect square, to facilitate the wrap. Sizes vary, from 45 by 45 centimetres (18 in × 18 in) and 70 by 70 centimetres (28 in × 28 in) up to 100 by 100 centimetres (39 in × 39 in). The main pattern is always on the bottom half, so it shows in the center. The gift should fit into one third of a furoshiki. Fabric patterns can contain traditional motifs such as cranes, turtles and pines and are double-sided prints.

The Ministry of the Environment of Japan has published a leaflet with 14 folding patterns.

== See also ==
- Fukusa, a type of Japanese textile used for gift wrapping or for purifying equipment during a Japanese tea ceremony
- Bojagi, a similar square wrapping cloth in Korea
- Tenugui, a thin Japanese hand towel made of cotton
