= Regifting =

Giving a received gift to somebody else

Regifting or regiving is the act of taking a gift that has been received and giving it to somebody else, sometimes in the guise of a new gift.

== Concept ==
Regifting differs from straightforward giving in that goods are not acquired specifically for donation. Typically, goods that have been received as a gift are offered to others, unbeknown to them that it was originally a gift to the person offering it. Often the motives are principally charitable but also includes giving items which are surplus to one's needs. However, regifting also refers to the act of giving away unwanted gifts as a way of disposing them.

Regiving differs from recycling in that recycling is most often associated with breaking components down and rebuilding into new products.

== Etymology ==
The term was popularized by a 1995 episode of the NBC sitcom Seinfeld ("The Label Maker"), although the practice pre-dates the term considerably. In the episode, the character Elaine calls Dr. Tim Whatley a "regifter" after he gives Jerry Seinfeld a label maker that was originally given to Whatley by Elaine. (Whatley later reveals to Elaine that the label maker was faulty, which gave him the excuse to give the item away.)

Another variant introduced in Seinfeld is degifting (see Indian giver), which refers to the act of demanding a gift back from the receiver.

== Etiquette ==
Several rules of etiquette are proposed in popular media regarding regifting; they include rewrapping the gift, not using the gift before regifting it, and not giving the gift back to the original gift-giver.

Regifting has become a popular addition to many white elephant gift exchanges or yankee swap events. There are no rules that specifically prohibit or encourage the practice of regifting at these parties, but generally the host of the party suggests regifting if it is an option. However, if the host suggests a spending limit for the party, it is generally poor etiquette to regift in lieu of making a purchase. The online variations of these exchanges eliminate this situation through their online purchasing requirements. One example of a formalization of this activity are the white elephant gift exchanges, in which items can be regifted from year to year.

A variant of regifting was mentioned as one of Oprah's Favorite Things during the recession-themed 2008 episode.

A Fairleigh Dickinson University PublicMind Poll in December 2010 showed that regifting was commonplace. Burçak Ertimur, one of the investigators in the study, and a professor of marketing at FDU, said “The popularity of regifting is driven by many things for different people. For some, it's thrift in difficult economic times, or it's a way to get around annoyingly high expectations about gift-giving. It's also awareness of, or guilt over, how much stuff goes into the landfill. But the main reason might be just the sheer volume of stuff we have,” she said.

Regifting has recently become more acceptable when it was adopted by environmentally and budgetary conscious people that encourage the green gifting concept.

== Commercial and other uses of the term ==
In the US, National Regifting Day is December 18, created by a debt-counselling group called Money Management International. Many office holiday parties are held on this day, and research shows that 40% of office party gifts are regifted without use. On October 24, 2008, the Governor of Colorado, Bill Ritter Jr., declared December 18, 2008, "National Regifting Day". In Canada, eBay marketed "National Re-gifting Week" as December 26–30, after Christmas.

== See also ==
- The Freecycle Network
- Tit for tat
- Pay it forward
