= Gift wrapping =

Surrounding a gift with material to conceal it

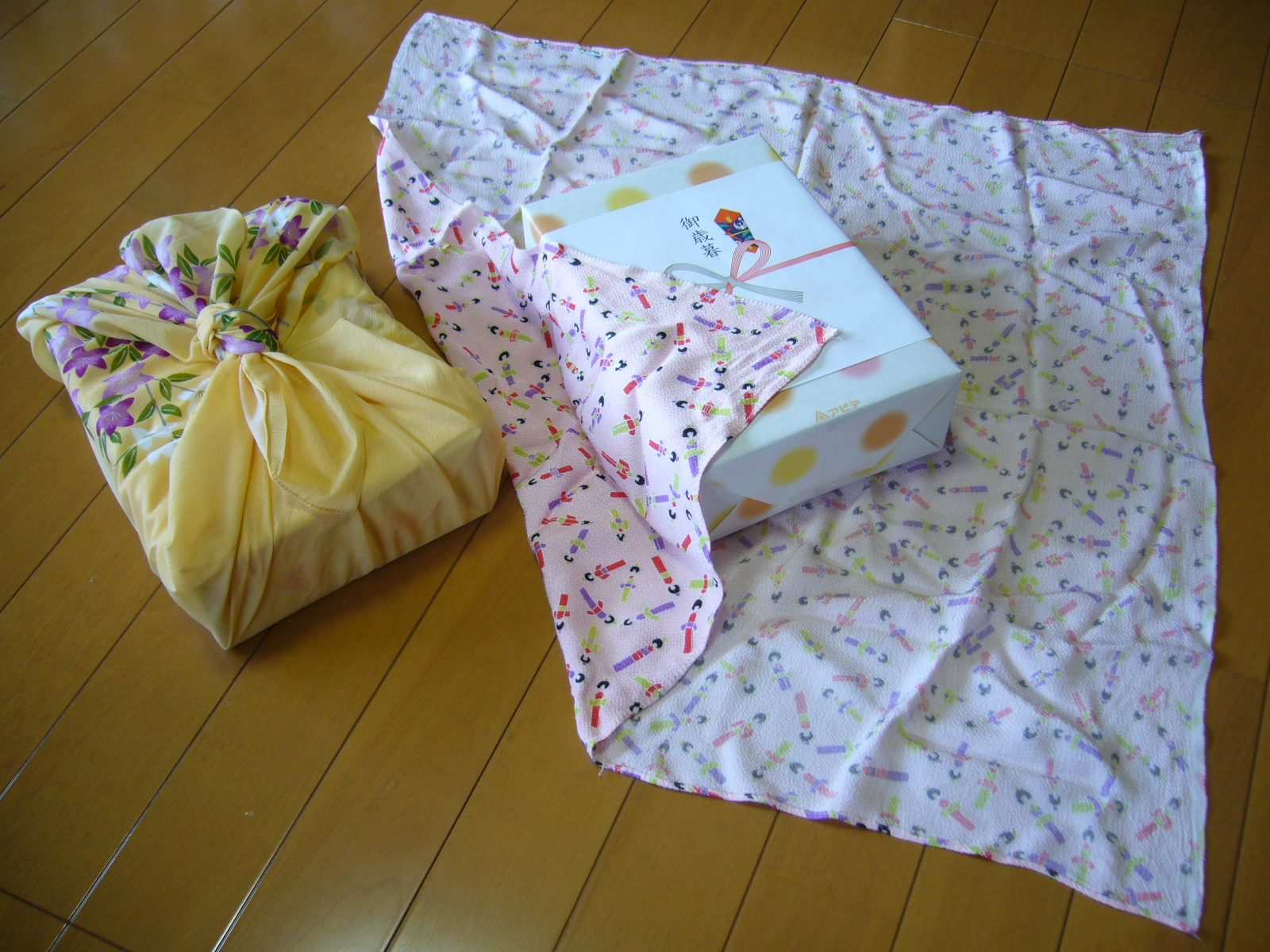
Gifts wrapped in the traditional Japanese fabric wrapping style of Furoshiki.

Gift wrapping is the act of enclosing a gift in some sort of material. Wrapping paper is a kind of paper designed for gift wrapping. An alternative to gift wrapping is using a gift box or bag. A wrapped or boxed gift may be held closed with ribbon and topped with a decorative bow (an ornamental knot made of ribbon).

== History ==
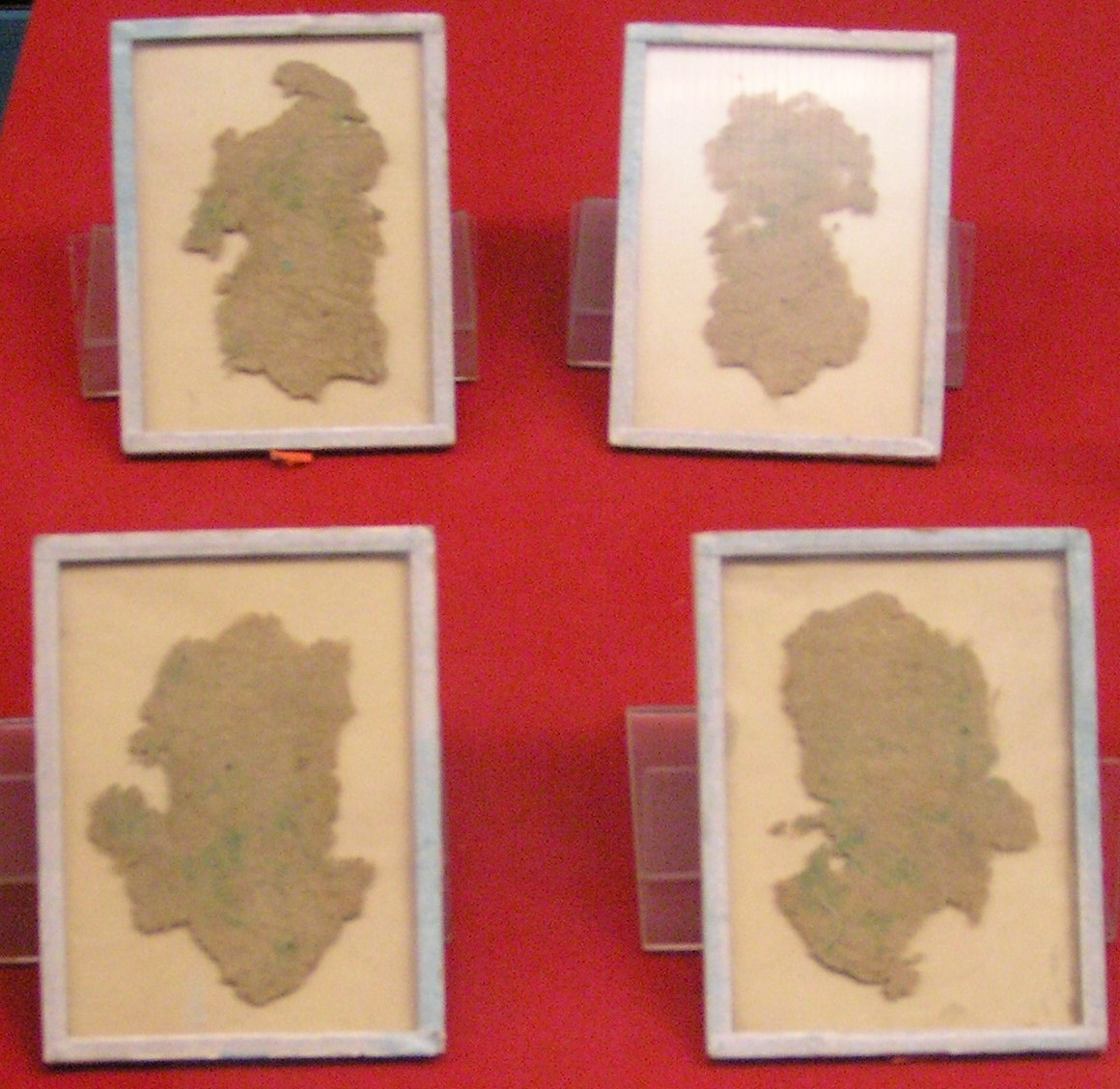
Hemp wrapping paper, China, c. 100 BC.

The use of wrapping paper is first documented in ancient China, where paper was invented in the 2nd century BC. In the Southern Song dynasty, monetary gifts were wrapped with paper, forming an envelope known as a chih pao. The wrapped gifts were distributed by the Chinese court to government officials. In the Chinese text Thien Kung Khai Wu, Sung Ying-Hsing states that the coarsest wrapping paper is manufactured with rice straws and bamboo fiber.

Although the Hall brothers Rollie and Joyce Hall, founders of Hallmark Cards, did not invent gift wrapping, their innovations led to the development of modern gift wrapping. They helped to popularize the idea of decorative gift wrapping in the 20th century, and according to Joyce Hall, "the decorative gift-wrapping business was born the day Rollie placed those French envelope linings on top of that showcase."

== By culture ==
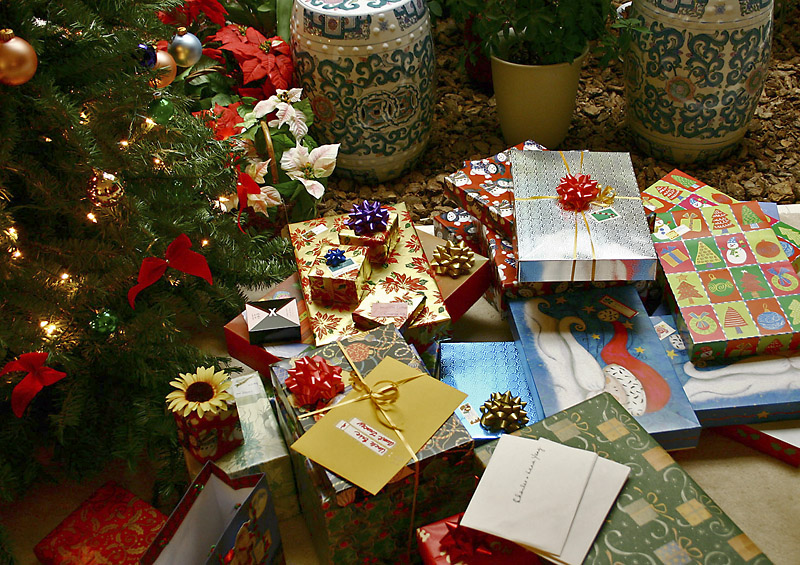
Gift wrapped presents beneath the Christmas tree

=== Asian cultures ===
In Chinese culture, red wrapping denotes luck because it is such a vibrant and strong color. It is seen as a symbol of happiness and good health.

In Japanese culture, wrapping paper and boxes are common. However, the traditional cloth wrapping called furoshiki is increasing in popularity, particularly as an ecologically friendly alternative to wrapping paper.

In Korean culture, bojagi are sometimes used for gift wrapping. A yedanbo is a ceremonial gift bojagi used to wrap wedding gifts from the bride's family to the members of the groom's.

In Vietnamese culture, gift wrapping is an integral part of the gift-giving tradition. Vietnamese people often use elegant and colorful gift boxes to create visual appeal. The colors red and gold are particularly favored, as they symbolize luck and joy. Vietnamese people also pay special attention to the messages and wishes on the gifts, expressing care and affection. Additionally, there is a trend towards using environmentally friendly materials such as recycled paper and sustainable ribbons for gift wrapping.

=== Western cultures ===
In Western culture gifts are often wrapped in wrapping paper and accompanied by a gift note which may note the occasion, the receiver's name and the giver's name.

Prior to the introduction of tissue paper, upper-class Victorians in the west commonly used decorated and coloured thick paper to cover their gifts. Modern patterned wrapping paper was introduced to the American market by the Hall Brothers in 1917. The Kansas City stationery store had run out of traditional white, red, and green monocolor tissue papers, and started selling colorful envelope liners from France. Proving popular, the company promoted the new designs in the subsequent decades, adding ribbons in the 1930s, and Hallmark remains one of the largest American producers of gift wrap. Hallmark records that gift wrap accounts for $3.2 billion annually in retail sales in the U.S.

== Waste ==
In Britain it is estimated that 226,800 miles (365,000 km) of wrapping paper is thrown away annually at Christmas. In Canada, 6 million rolls of tape are used and discarded yearly for gift wrapping at Christmas. Some people attempt to avoid wastage by unwrapping gifts with care to allow the paper to be reused, while others use decorated cloth gift sacks that can be easily reused many times; both of these concepts are part of the green gifting trend that encourages recycling. Many people are moving into the trend of wrapping gifts with newspaper, magazine pages, old maps, calendars and into baskets to save single use wrapping paper from ending up in the garbage.

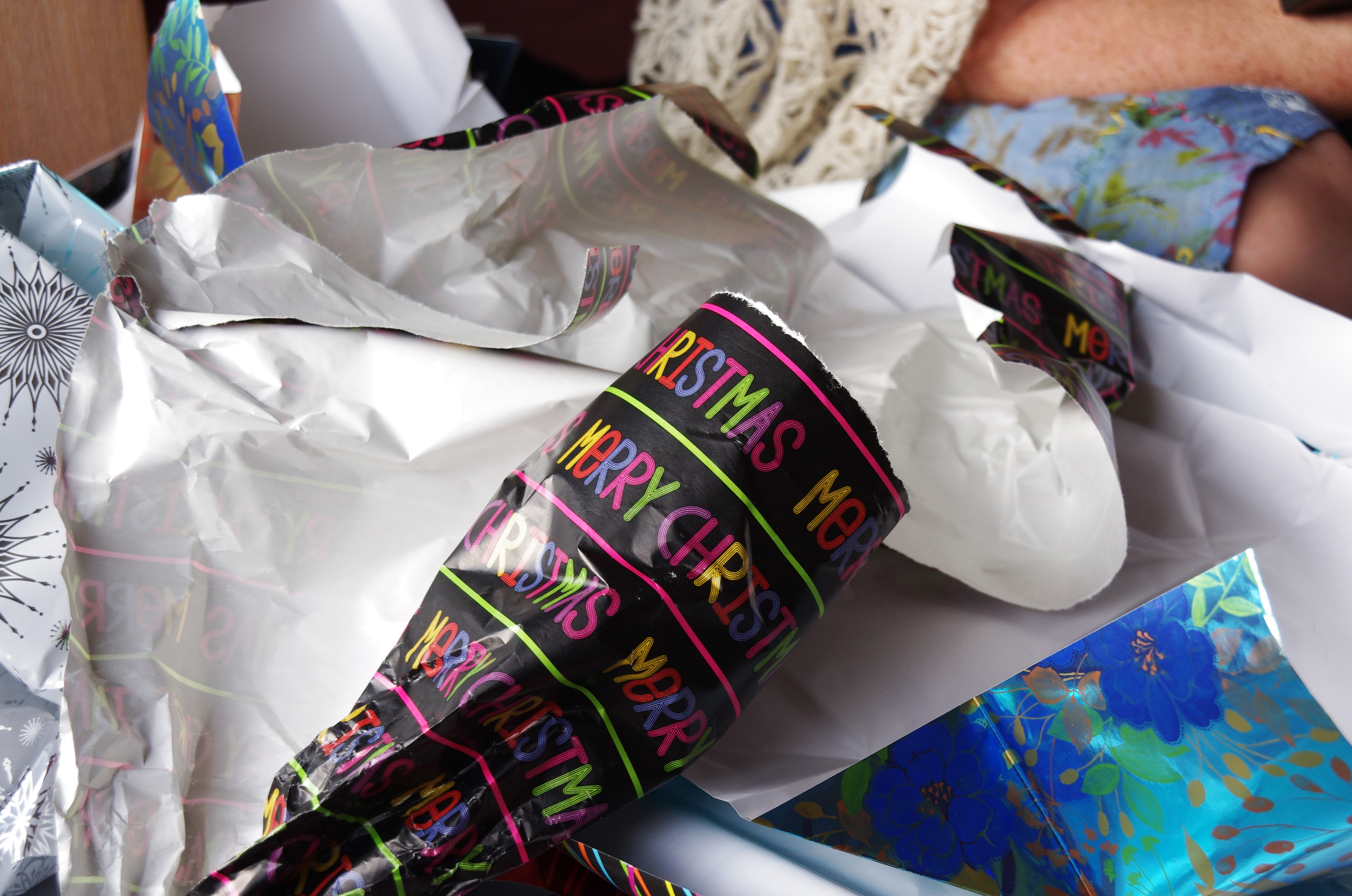
Torn gift wrapping paper after the gift exchange

=== Disposal ===
Disposing of wrapping paper has become increasingly complex as not all papers are made entirely of paper and can be disposed of as regular waste paper. Visually stunning glossy gift papers are often coated with plastic varnishes or films, making them unsuitable for recycling and requiring disposal as residual waste. Only simple, printed gift wrapping paper can be easily recycled with regular paper waste.

If gift papers were fully recyclable and recycled at a 100% rate, it could save 70% of energy compared to linear production. However, especially glittering, laminated, and textured gift papers contain a significant amount of microplastics. Previous generations used to carefully preserve gift wrapping paper for reuse and only used fabric ribbons to avoid damaging the paper, but more recent practice relies on laminated paper with adhesive tape, which is often discarded after a single use.

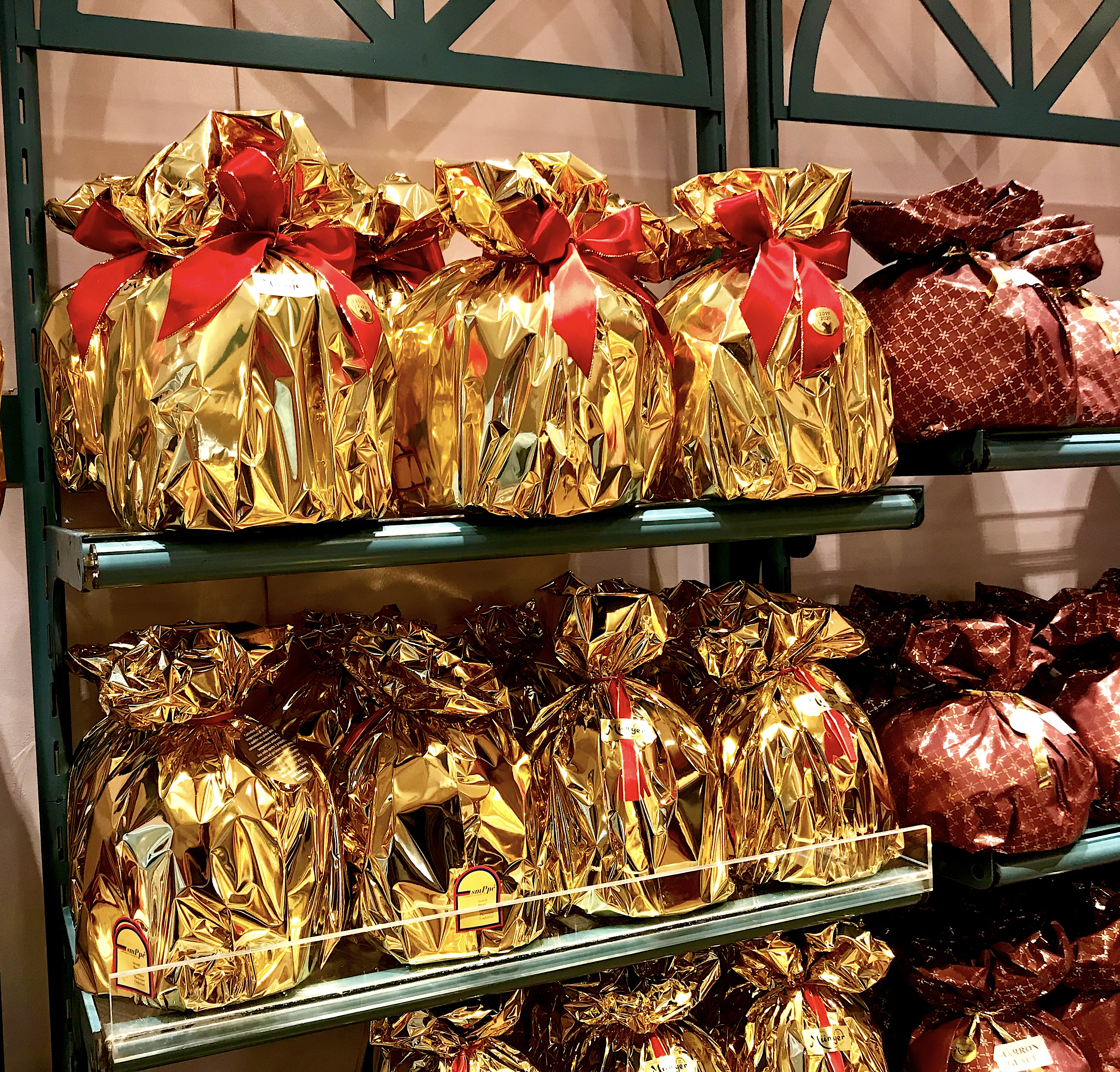
Not every gift packaging is recyclable

=== Packaging waste ===
In Germany about 100 grams of gift wrapping paper per person are used each year, resulting in up to 8,000 tons of wrapping paper waste. But not all types of paper can be fully recycled.

Estimates from the United Kingdom indicate that the equivalent of 108 million rolls of gift wrapping paper were discarded after Christmas 2018, considering an annual consumption that exceeds 350,000 kilometers.

In Canada gift packaging and paper shopping bags generate 540,000 tons of packaging waste annually. Due to recycling challenges, most gift wrapping paper made from various materials ends up in landfills.

During the Christmas season in the United States, an additional 5 million tons of waste are generated, with up to 4 million tons consisting of various gift packaging and gift papers.

== Function and usage ==
A study conducted in 1992 at Southern Methodist University in Texas examined whether the act of wrapping a gift has an impact on the recipient's experience. It was found that gift wrapping enhances anticipation and that recipients tend to value wrapped gifts more than unwrapped ones.

Gift wrapping paper serves multiple purposes: it protects the gift during transportation and provides an element of surprise and excitement when it is unwrapped. Therefore, gift wrapping paper is used not only during gift exchanges but also for occasions like children's birthdays.

Gift wrapping papers are designed to suit different occasions where gift-giving is customary, leading to a separation of motifs. The industry distinguishes between year-round collections and seasonal collections, with Christmas gift wrapping paper being the most prominent among seasonal products. Nowadays, specialized gift wrapping paper is available for various occasions such as birthdays, weddings, Mother's Day, and anniversaries.

Many stores now offer on-site gift wrapping services, either for free or for a fee, depending on the store. Some drugstores even provide complimentary gift wrapping paper for items purchased in-store.

Additionally, an increasing number of online retailers offer gift wrapping as an additional service. Some even offer the option to send the wrapped gifts directly to the recipient along with a personalized greeting card.

Industrially manufactured gift wrapping paper is widely accessible to consumers in retail stores, usually in the form of small rolls protected by plastic packaging. No one is sure when the standard wrapping-paper size of 26 inches first appeared. One theory is that the size was determined from the size of the standard shirt box, which is 15 by 10 by two inches, or 24 inches all the way around. That leaves a two-inch overlap. Certain specialty stationery stores offer gift wrapping paper in sheet format, featuring embossed patterns or special treatments like glitter elements.

It is now possible for individuals to create custom-designed gift wrapping paper at home and have the design printed by a printing shop or photo lab.

== Psychology ==
In the past, gift wrapping has been shown to positively influence the recipients who are more likely to rate their gifts positively if they had traditional gift wrapping. More recently, researchers have found that gift recipients will have higher expectations of the gift inside based on the neatness of the gift-wrapping.

In many countries the colour of wrapping paper has associations with symbolic meanings pertaining to funerals and mourning. These certain colours should be avoided when wrapping gifts in these countries.
