= Museum of Korean Embroidery =

Museum in Seoul, South Korea

Coordinates: 37°30′55″N 127°02′00″E

The Museum of Korean Embroidery is a museum in Seoul, South Korea. It originally opened in 1976 and moved to its current location in the Nonhyeong-dong neighborhood of Gangnam in 1991. The museum holds several national treasures and has loaned pieces for traveling exhibits.

In 2018, the museum's owners donated 5,000 pieces from the collection to the Seoul Craft Museum.

== See also ==
- List of museums in South Korea
