= The Freecycle Network =

Nonprofit organization

- The Freecycle Network logo
- Abbreviation: TFN
- Formation: 1 May 2003
- Legal status: 501(c)3
- Region served: 121 countries
- Members: 6,880,991
- Founder, executive director: Deron Beal
- Website: www.freecycle.org

The Freecycle Network (TFN) is a private, nonprofit organization registered in Arizona, US and is a charity in the United Kingdom. TFN coordinates a worldwide network of "gifting" groups to divert reusable goods from landfills. The network provides a worldwide online registry, organizing the creation of local groups and forums for individuals and nonprofits to offer (or request) free items for reuse or recycling and to promote a gift economy. In contrast, although flea markets and swap meets also contribute to the 3 Rs (reduce, reuse, recycle), they involve mainly buying and selling or bartering rather than gifting.

== History ==
TFN first began when its founder, Deron Beal, collaborated with RISE, a small nonprofit corporation that offers recycling services in the downtown area of Tucson, Arizona, US. The team worked together to find local nonprofits that could potentially use their products, but it was not too successful. Hence, Beal created the first Freecycle email that enabled online users to interact with recycling. In February 2005, TFN accepted $130,000 from Waste Management to help build out the website and the network.

Over time, the concept has spread to over 110 countries, with thousands of local groups and millions of members.

The organization began as a collection of Yahoo! Groups linked from freecycle.org. It has become a web-community platform on freecycle.org for all groups, which are run by local volunteers. TFN encourages the formation of new groups, subject to approval by regional new-group approvers. Groups approved by TFN are listed on the website, can use the TFN name and logo, and are subject to rules which are enforced by a network of global and regional group outreach assistance. As of March 2009, all new groups had to join freecycle.org's new-group system, which provides Freecycle-specific tools for local volunteer moderators and gives TFN oversight of individual groups. As of 2015, all local groups are listed on freecycle.org.

== Membership ==
Membership is completely free to all members, and everything posted on the website must be completely free, legal, and appropriate for everyone regardless of their age. Today, TFN is a global organization with over 4,000 local chapters. They passed the two-million-member mark in February 2006. By February 2014, TFN had 6,880,991 members across 5,120 groups worldwide. In December 2023, TFN had 11,022,137 members across 5,355 groups worldwide.

== Controversies ==
=== Trademark issues ===
A notice of opposition was filed in federal court by FreecycleSunnyvale against the Freecycle Network in January 2006. An injunction was granted against Tim Oey in May 2006 for allegedly disparaging the TFN trademark. The injunction was stayed in July 2006 and dissolved by the United States Court of Appeals for the Ninth Circuit in September 2007. To defend its trademark in 2006, TFN pursued other free recycling groups who used the word "freecycle" or allegedly had "confusingly similar derivations thereof".

Free-speech advocates, including the Electronic Frontier Foundation and 38 law professors, filed an amicus brief opposing a trademark-infringement lawsuit filed by TFN against Tim Oey. The opposition was based on the position that the lawsuit violated Oey's First Amendment rights. Other law professors, including Lawrence Lessig, and Jimmy Wales filed a second amicus brief in support of Oey. In 2007, the US 9th Circuit Court affirmed that freecycle may be used as a word.

On November 24, 2010, TFN lost its trademark claim to "Freecycle" and its logo in the Ninth Circuit Court of Appeals. Justice Consuelo María Callahan wrote in her opinion, "Beal did not coin the word 'freecycle' and TFN is not the first organization to promote freecycling ... even ... viewing the evidence in the light most favorable to TFN ... [they] engaged in naked licensing and consequently abandoned the trademarks."

On September 25, 2012, TFN gained a registered trademark in the United States for Freecycle.org (registration number 4215094) from the United States Patent and Trademark Office. TFN also received a registered-collective-membership trademark on that date (registration number 4215095). TFN maintains additional registered trademarks in the European Union, New Zealand, Australia and Canada.

=== UK breakaway ===
During 2009, there were conflicts between the UK's independent association of TFN moderators and the organization's founders over the UK-based TFN groups' lack of freedom to develop local initiatives and features and their treatment of volunteer group owners and moderators. This resulted in the dismissal of at least 20 local group owners and moderators, who were replaced with new local TFN volunteers. Many owners of UK-based TFN groups formed a new independent association, Freegle. TFN continued in the UK, with both groups present in many areas. In February 2015, TFN UK claimed to have 592 groups with 4,345,095 members.

=== Payment to Founder ===
Based on information from the relevant IRS Form 990, in 2024 the Freecycle founder, Deron Beal, received an annual payment of $113, 600 but other listed officers were not compensated. 990 Forms can be accessed using the IRS Tax Exempt Organization search tool.

== See also ==
- Buy Nothing Project
- Freecycling
- Glocalization
- Reciprocal altruism
- Regift
- Reuse
- Sharing economy
- Symbiosis
- Social software
- Waste hierarchy
