= Freegle =

UK network for gifting and reusing things

- Freegle logo
- Formation: 11 September 2009
- Type: Network of Communities
- Legal status: Registered society
- Purpose: Reuse
- Region served: United Kingdom
- Members: 2,608,461
- Official language: English
- Budget: £40,000 per year
- Volunteers: Approx. 1000
- Website: ilovefreegle.org

Freegle is a UK organisation that aims to increase reuse and reduce landfill by offering a free Internet-based service where people can give away and ask for things that would otherwise be thrown away.

== History ==
Freegle was formed on 11 September 2009 after many Freecycle groups in the UK decided to break away from the US parent organisation following disagreements on how groups in the UK should operate, and the dismissal of long-term UK moderators who had been speaking out.

== Organisation ==
Each local Freegle group is run by volunteers, is autonomous and affiliates to the national Freegle organisation provided they meet basic requirements such as being free to join and everything handed on must be free and legal. Freegle is a registered society under the Co-operative and Community Benefit Societies Act 2014 and an exempt charity.

== Membership numbers ==
In January 2021, there were 453 groups, supported by about 449 volunteers, with 3,267,715 members in the UK.

== Hosting ==
Freegle groups are hosted on Freegle's own open source platform. A lot of Freegle groups are also accessible via the Trash Nothing website.

== Mobile apps ==
In April 2015 the Freegle mobile app was launched to allow access to Freegle Direct groups on Android, iOS and Kindle phones and tablets.

== See also ==
- Gift economy
- Freecycle
- Reciprocal altruism
- Reuse
- Sharing
- Sharing economy
- Circular economy
- Waste Hierarchy
