= 2023 in Australia =

- Monarch: Charles III
- Governor-General: David Hurley
- Prime minister: Anthony Albanese
- Australian of the Year: Taryn Brumfitt
- Elections: New South Wales

The following is a list of events which occurred in the year 2023 in Australia.

- Decades: 2000s; 2010s; 2020s; 2030s
- See also: 2023 in Australian television; 2023 in Australian literature; Other events of 2023; Timeline of Australian history

== Incumbents ==
Monarch

Charles III

Governor-General

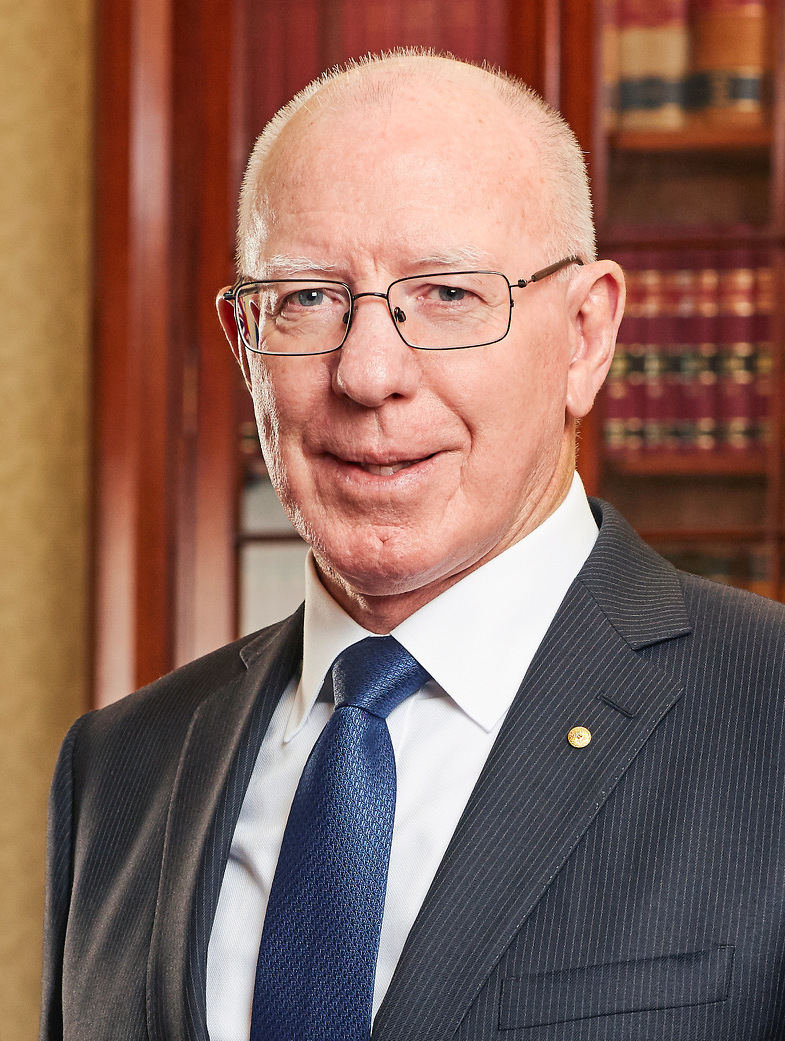
David Hurley

Prime Minister

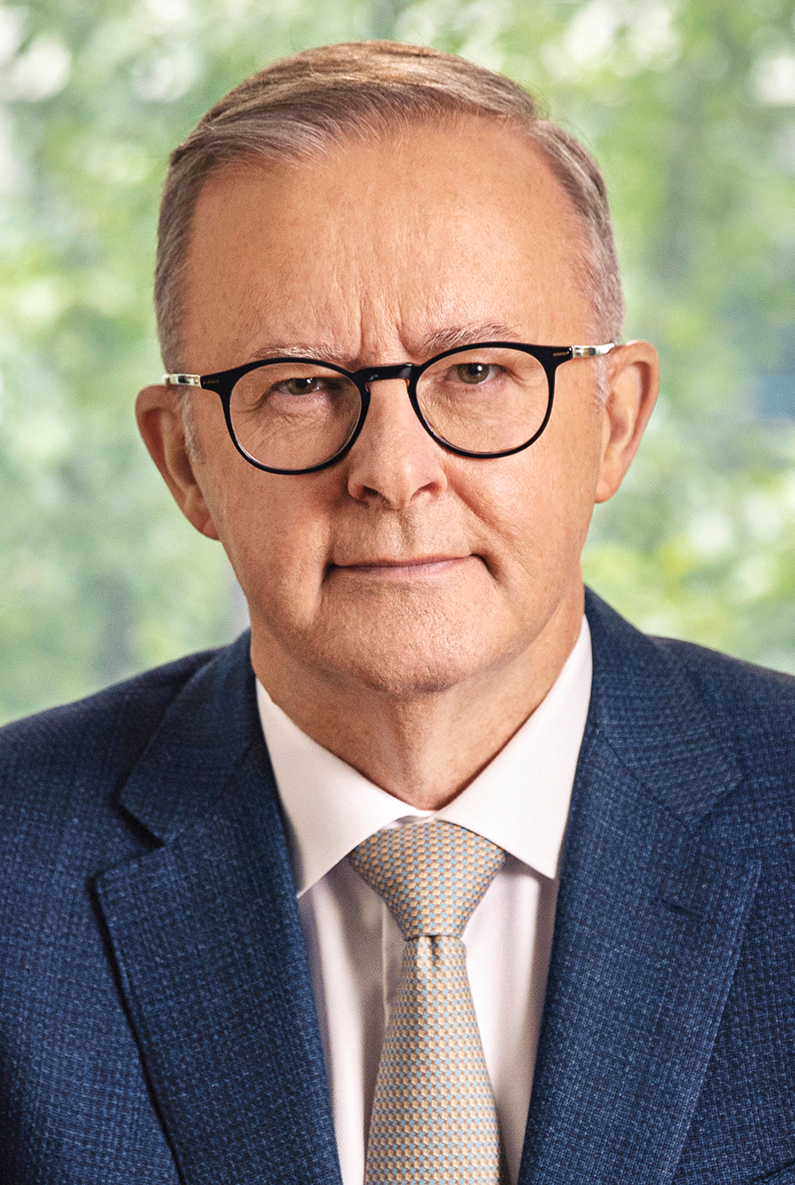
Anthony Albanese

Deputy Prime Minister

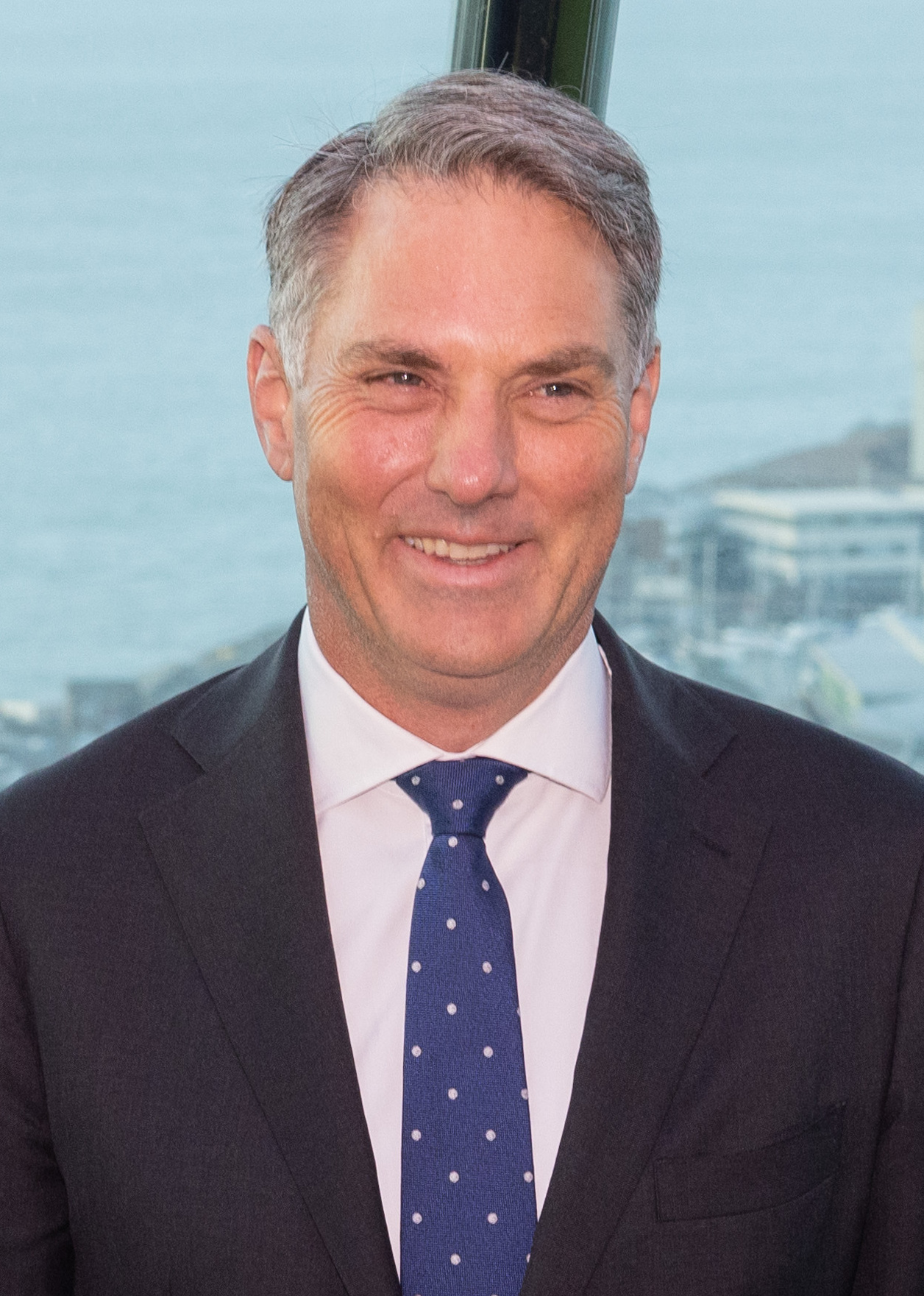
Richard Marles

Opposition Leader

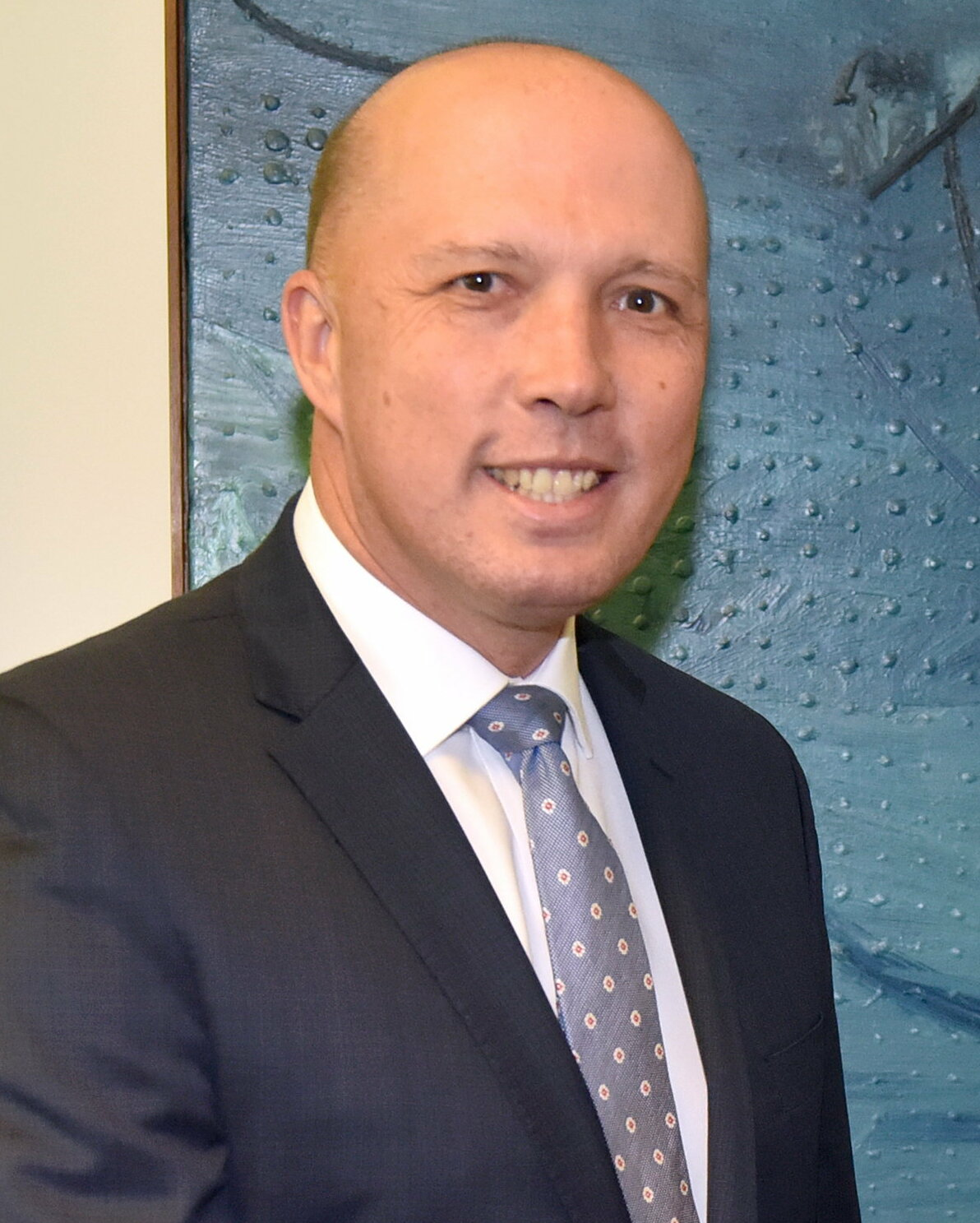
Peter Dutton

Chief Justice

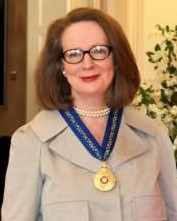
Susan Kiefel
until 5th November

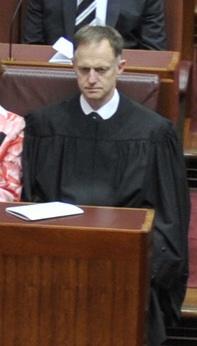
Stephen Gageler
from 6th November

=== State and territory leaders ===
- Premier of New South Wales – Dominic Perrottet (until 28 March), then Chris Minns
  - Opposition Leader – Chris Minns (until 28 March), then Mark Speakman (from 21 April)
- Premier of Queensland – Annastacia Palaszczuk (until 15 December), then Steven Miles
  - Opposition Leader – David Crisafulli
- Premier of South Australia – Peter Malinauskas
  - Opposition Leader – David Speirs
- Premier of Tasmania – Jeremy Rockliff
  - Opposition Leader – Rebecca White
- Premier of Victoria – Daniel Andrews (until 27 September), then Jacinta Allan
  - Opposition Leader – John Pesutto
- Premier of Western Australia – Mark McGowan (until 8 June), then Roger Cook
  - Opposition Leader – Mia Davies (until 30 January), then Shane Love
- Chief Minister of the Australian Capital Territory – Andrew Barr
  - Opposition Leader – Elizabeth Lee
- Chief Minister of the Northern Territory – Natasha Fyles (until 21 December), then Eva Lawler
  - Opposition Leader – Lia Finocchiaro

=== Governors and administrators ===
- Governor of New South Wales – Margaret Beazley
- Governor of Queensland – Jeannette Young
- Governor of South Australia – Frances Adamson
- Governor of Tasmania – Barbara Baker
- Governor of Victoria – Linda Dessau (until 30 June), then James Angus (acting), then Margaret Gardner (from 9 August)
- Governor of Western Australia – Chris Dawson
- Administrator of the Australian Indian Ocean Territories – Natasha Griggs, then Farzian Zainal (from 19 June)
- Administrator of Norfolk Island – Eric Hutchinson (until 1 June), then George Plant
- Administrator of the Northern Territory – Vicki O'Halloran (until 2 February), then Hugh Heggie

== Events ==
=== January ===
- 1–10 January – The Kimberley and northern parts of Western Australia are severely affected by flooding caused by ex-Tropical Cyclone Ellie. The Fitzroy River at Fitzroy Crossing peaks at a record 15.81 metres on 4 January, with the bridge which carries the Great Northern Highway across the river damaged beyond repair. Over 200 people evacuated from several communities with authorities declaring it the worst flooding the state has ever seen prompting prime minister Anthony Albanese and state premier Mark McGowan to visit the flood affected areas to inspect the damage. The system eventually dissipates on 8 January and the Australian Defence Force is deployed to the area to help with the recovery efforts.
- 1 January – Residents in Menindee, New South Wales are warned to prepare for the highest flood levels in fifty years with the Darling River expected to peak at 10.7 metres.
- 2 January – A mid-air collision occurred in which two helicopters on the Gold Coast near Sea World which kills four people and injures nine others.
- 3 January – A Tasmanian prisoner who absconded from custody while receiving treatment at the Royal Hobart Hospital just before 11 pm the previous evening is found shot dead at Granton at approximately 1:30 am. Three men are subsequently charged with his murder and an investigation into how he escaped from custody is launched.
- 10–16 January – An incident involving a radioactive capsule occurs in Western Australia when a tiny radioactive capsule goes missing along a 1,400-kilometre stretch of the Great Northern Highway in Western Australia.
- 10 January – Residents across Northern Australia report shaking when the 7.6 magnitude undersea earthquake strikes near the Tanimbar Islands at 3:17 am ACST.
- 12–17 January – Heavy rainfall causes widespread flooding across large parts of North Queensland.
- 12 January –
  - Australian prime minister Anthony Albanese becomes the first foreign leader to address the National Parliament of Papua New Guinea. Albanese and Papua New Guinea prime minister James Marape also sign a joint statement pledging that the two countries will reach a new security deal by the end of April.
  - The leader of the National Socialist Network Thomas Sewell is sentenced to an 18-month community corrections order with 150 hours of community for affray and recklessly causing injury.
  - Liberal Premier of New South Wales Dominic Perrottet reveals that he wore a Nazi uniform as fancy dress at his 21st birthday, apologising at a media conference after a cabinet minister was made aware of the incident.
- 15 January – A 29-year-old Sydney teacher is one of 72 passengers and crew killed when Yeti Airlines Flight 691 crashes near Pokhara International Airport just prior to its schedule landing after arriving from Kathmandu.
- 18 January – An engine fails on a Qantas twin-jet Boeing 737 aircraft en route from New Zealand to Australia prompting the pilot of flight QF144 to declare a mayday before it arrives safely in Sydney.
- 22 January – Two West Australian women are killed when a boat crashes into a channel marker in the Mandurah estuary including the mother of West Coast Eagles player Rhett Bazzo. The skipper of the boat is later charged with two counts of manslaughter.
- 24 January – Prime Minister Anthony Albanese visits Alice Springs amid the town's youth crime crisis but is criticised for only spending four hours in the community. Restrictions on the sale of alcohol in Alice Springs are introduced by the Northern Territory government in an attempt to combat the amount of crime. The restrictions are put in place following calls from mayor Matt Paterson for the Australian Federal Police to be deployed to the town.
- 25 January – An arrest warrant is issued for pro-Russian YouTuber Simeon Boikov after failing to appear in court accused of assaulting a 76-year-old man at a pro-Ukraine rally at Sydney Town Hall in December 2022, prompting Boikov to take refuge in the Russian consulate.
- 26 January – A 10-year-old boy survives being struck by lightning while swimming at Warilla Beach in the Illawarra. He receives CPR and is then taken to the Children's Hospital at Westmead under police escort where he is admitted in a critical but stable condition prior to making a full recovery.
- 30 January –
  - Victoria coroner Simon McGregor hands down his findings into the death in custody of Veronica Nelson at the Dame Phyllis Frost Centre on 2 January 2020 four days after her arrest on suspicious of shoplifting on 30 December 2019. He criticises the state government for failing to implement recommendations from the Royal Commission into Aboriginal Deaths in Custody and finds the state's bail act discriminatory towards First Nations people, incompatible with the Charter of Human Rights and that the changes to the act in 2018 were a "complete, unmitigated disaster".
  - Thousands of people at the Alice Springs Convention Centre for a "Save Alice Springs" town meeting organised by local business owner Garth Thompson to discuss the crime issues affecting the town. Residents discuss the possibility of launching a $1.5 billion compensation claim against the Northern Territory Government for negligence. The one-hour meeting ends after just 20 minutes after attendees shouted down Thompson for suggesting truant school children be reported to police for a welfare check.

=== February ===
- 1 February – An incident involving a radioactive capsule concludes in Western Australia when a search team from Australian Nuclear Science and Technology Organisation and the WA Department of Fire and Emergency Services finds a missing caesium-137 capsule 74 km (46 mi) south of Newman.
- 2 February –
  - The Reserve Bank of Australia announces that King Charles III will not appear on the new five-dollar banknote. A design celebrating First Nations peoples will appear instead.
  - Hundreds of protesters march outside St Mary's Cathedral in Sydney during the funeral service for George Pell.
- 3 February – Despite pleading guilty one count of common assault, Australian tennis player Nick Kyrgios has the charge dismissed by ACT magistrate Beth Campbell who decides no conviction should be recorded against Kyrgios.
- 4 February – A 16-year-old girl is killed in a shark attack while swimming in the Swan River at Fremantle, Western Australia.
- 6 February – A Boeing 737-300 owned by Coulson Aviation and serving as a firefighting air tanker crashes in the Fitzgerald River National Park in southern Western Australia.
- 9 February – Former Liberal Minister for Education and Youth Alan Tudge announces his resignation in parliament, effective from the end of the following week.
- 12–15 February – At least 21 structures including homes are destroyed in several bushfires burning on Queensland's Western Downs. The separate fires near Tara, Miles and Jandowae burn a combined total of 150,000 hectares of land.
- 16 February – Katter's Australian Party announces on Facebook that its MPs will not support the Voice.
- 17 February – New South Wales finance minister Damien Tudehope resigns from state cabinet after it's discovered he failed to disclose he has shares in Transurban.
- 18 February – At a Country Liberal Party meeting, party members vote to oppose the Voice to Parliament.
- 23 February – The national campaign in favour of the Indigenous Voice to Parliament referendum officially begins at the Tandanya National Aboriginal Cultural Institute in Adelaide.
- 26 February – Papua New Guinea prime minister James Marape announces that University of Southern Queensland professor Bryce Barker and two of his colleagues have been released from captivity more than a week after they were kidnapped by a criminal gang while doing archaeological fieldwork in Papua New Guinea.

=== March ===
- 1–15 March – Major flooding in the upper Victoria River affects remote Northern Territory communities prompting the evacuation of residents to Darwin. The flooding also severs road and rail links between the Northern Territory and Western Australia impacting the supply of fresh food and essential supplies.
- 5 March – 50,000 people march across the Sydney Harbour Bridge for the Pride March on the final day of WorldPride.
- 6 March – The historic Pride of the Murray paddle wheeler sinks in the Thomson River at Longreach in Central West Queensland with police treating the incident as suspicious. The vessel, which had been trucked to Longreach from Victoria in 2022, is raised from the riverbed in September 2023 with the owner hopeful of it being restored in time for its 100th anniversary in 2024.
- 8 March – Australian prime minister Anthony Albanese commences a four-day bilateral visit to India at the invitation of Indian prime minister Shri Narendra Modi. During the visit, both prime ministers ride in a chariot in a lap of honour at the fourth cricket test at Narendra Modi Stadium in Ahmedabad.
- 15 March – Former Labor prime minister Paul Keating uses a National Press Club address to criticise the AUKUS nuclear-powered submarine deal the federal Labor government had reached with the United Kingdom and the United States, describing it as the worst international decision made by an Australian government since conscription in World War I. Keating also criticises Joe Biden, Boris Johnson, Anthony Albanese, Richard Marles, Penny Wong, Peter Hartcher, Matthew Knott, Olivia Caisley and Australian security agencies. However, Keating defends China and claims the country doesn't pose a threat. Keating is criticised for his behaviour towards journalists at the press club.
- 18 March – Approximately 30 members of the National Socialist Network, including Thomas Sewell, attended a rally in Melbourne in support of British anti-transgender activist Kellie-Jay Keen-Minshull, who spoke at the rally while visiting the city on her Australian tour. Members of the NSN marched down Spring Street, displayed a banner that read "DESTROY PAEDO FREAKS", performed Nazi salutes on the stairs of Victorian Parliament House. A counterprotest in support of transgender rights, attended by many students, transgender activists, and socialists, clashed with the group. While the police, including several mounted officers, attempted to separate the two groups. The events were condemned by the Labor Party, the Liberal Party and the Greens.
- 19 March – Victorian Liberal leader of the opposition, John Pesutto announced, that he would move to have Moira Deeming expelled from the parliamentary Liberal Party after she spoke at an anti-trans rally outside the Victorian Parliament. In the end, a compromise was made with Deeming accepting a nine-month suspension from the party instead of expulsion from the party.
- 22 March – Ten Australian Defence Force personnel survive after the MRH-90 Taipan army helicopter they were on ditches into the sea at Jervis Bay during counterterrorism exercises.
- 25 March – New South Wales State election elected the 58th Parliament. Chris Minns won after 12 years in opposition for Labor.
- 26 March – Former US president Barack Obama arrives in Australia for several public speaking engagements. Controversy arises when organisers of the event in Melbourne prevent 78-year-old Wurundjeri elder Aunty Joy Murphy from delivering the Welcome to Country and is allegedly told she was being "too difficult" for requesting a support person and the opportunity to present Obama with a gift as per cultural practice.
- 30 March – Following the 2023 New South Wales state election, Mark Latham NSW One Nation leader published a tweet in response to comments by gay politician Alex Greenwich. Latham's tweet included an explicit and derogatory description of anal sex: "Disgusting? How does that compare with sticking your dick up a bloke's arse and covering it with shit?". The comments were deemed to be homophobic by Alex Greenwich and other politicians, Conservative commentator Andrew Bolt and One Nation leader Pauline Hanson criticised Latham and called for him to apologise.

=== April ===
- 1 April – In a by-election in the Division of Aston caused by the resignation of Liberal member Alan Tudge, the Labor candidate, Mary Doyle, won with a swing of 7%. The result marked the first time since 1920 that an Australian government had won a by-election from the opposition.
- 3 April – After a six-week trial during the Adass Israel School sex abuse scandal, former principal Malka Leifer is found guilty by a jury in the County Court of Victoria of 18 sexual offences against two former students and not guilty of 9 charges against a third.
- 4 April –
  - After more than four years and three trials, former NRL player Jarryd Hayne is found guilty by a jury in the District Court of New South Wales of sexually assaulting a woman in Newcastle in 2018. Hayne is released from prison in June 2024 when his convictions are quashed on appeal in the New South Wales Court of Criminal Appeal.
  - TikTok is banned on all government devices, including the mobile phones of politicians.
- 5 April –
  - Terence Darrell Kelly, the man who kidnapped 4-year-old Cleo Smith from her family's tent during a camping trip in Western Australia and held her captive for more than two weeks, is sentenced to 13 years and six months in jail.
  - After a party room meeting, it was announced that the Liberal Party of Australia will oppose the Voice citing constitutional risks. All members of the shadow ministry are bound by this decision but a conscience vote is allowed for backbencher members.
- 13 April – Cyclone Ilsa crosses the Western Australia coast between Port Hedland and Bidyadanga as a category 5 system just before midnight local time.
- 18 April – Liberal party leader Peter Dutton following a shadow cabinet reshuffle announced that Senator Jacinta Nampijinpa Price will be appointed as the shadow Minister for Indigenous Australians.
- 20 April – Large crowds gather in Exmouth, Western Australia to experience a rare total solar eclipse.
- 22 April – Prime Minister Anthony Albanese and Defence Minister Richard Marles announce that the wreck of Japanese transport ship Montevideo Maru had been discovered in the South China Sea. An estimated total of 979 Australian prisoners of war and civilians were on board when it was sunk by American submarine USS Sturgeon in 1942 during World War II making it the worst maritime disaster in Australia's history.
- 27 April – In what is her first official Australian engagement in ten years, Mary, Crown Princess of Denmark arrives in Sydney for a 24-hour visit, leading a Danish delegation to discuss Australia's sustainability and its transition to green energy.

=== May ===
- 2 May – Vanessa Hudson is announced as the new chief executive officer of Qantas to succeed Alan Joyce when he officially retires in November.
- 5 May – A penumbral lunar eclipse is visible in the evening and the following morning in Africa, Asia and Australia, and is the 24th lunar eclipse of Lunar Saros 141.
- 6 May – Coronation of Charles III as King of Australia and the other Commonwealth realms. Governor-General David Hurley and Prime Minister Anthony Albanese attend the ceremony in London. In Australia, a salvo of cannon fire also takes place.
- 7 May – An anti-crime rally is held in the Queensland city of Rockhampton organised by former One Nation candidate and former head of the Patriots Defence League, Torin O'Brien. It descends into chaos when a large group of attendees march on the addresses of alleged offenders in the suburbs of Norman Gardens and Berserker requiring police officers to stand guard at the properties. It also prompts warnings from Queensland Police commissioner Katarina Carroll and Queensland premier Annastacia Palaszczuk about the dangers of vigilantism. Facebook also blocks O'Brien.
- 10 May – The ACT Government announces plans to force an acquisition on the Christian Calvary Hospital, Canberra hospital land and assets. Archbishop of Sydney, Anthony Fisher condemned the proposal as an abuse of property rights and religious freedom, acquiring the hospital to force an "anti-life agenda" by performing abortions and assisted suicide. The Opposition Canberra Liberals also oppose the acquisition.
- 12 May – Lara Alexander, alongside fellow Tasmanian Liberal John Tucker state MP, quits the Liberal Party to sit as an independent, in part due to concerns related to the proposed Macquarie Point Stadium project. This leaves the Liberal Party in minority government and requiring seven seats to reach a majority in the next state election.
- 16 May – A school bus crashes west of Melbourne with 45 children on board.
- 17 May – A 95-year-old woman with dementia is tasered by a New South Wales police officer at an aged care facility in Cooma, New South Wales and sustains serious injuries after falling and fracturing her skull. The officer is charged with recklessly causing grievous bodily harm, assault occasioning actual bodily harm, and common assault. The woman later dies in hospital from her injuries.
- 21 May – Northern Territory chief minister Natasha Fyles is allegedly accosted and harassed by anti-fracking protestors while running the final five kilometres of the West Macs Monster – an annual 25 km running event along the Larapinta Trail.
- 22 May – Indian prime minister Shri Narendra Modi arrives in Australia for a two-day visit to Australia during which he meets business and political leaders including prime minister Anthony Albanese.
- 24 May –
  - A heritage-listed former hat factory in the Sydney suburb of Surry Hills, designed by Thomas Pollard Sampson and built in 1912, is destroyed by fire.
  - The federal treasury refers PwC to the Australian Federal Police for a criminal investigation.
- 29 May –
  - Western Australia premier Mark McGowan announces his intention to resign, citing exhaustion as his reason for stepping down.
  - 22-year-old Queensland sailor Xavier Doerr departs the Gold Coast on his attempt to break the records for the fastest solo and fastest non-stop circumnavigation of Australia.
- 31 May – The Constitution Alteration (Aboriginal and Torres Strait Islander Voice) 2023 passes the House of Representatives, paving the way for the Indigenous Voice referendum to take place later in the year.

=== June ===
- 1 June – Former soldier Ben Roberts-Smith loses a civil defamation trial in which he attempted to sue newspapers the Sydney Morning Herald, The Age and Canberra Times and journalists Chris Masters, Nick McKenzie and David Wroe. Roberts-Smith is found to have committed war crimes in Afghanistan with Justice Anthony Besanko ruling that the newspapers and journalists had established substantial or contextual truth regarding alleged unlawful killings and bullying.
- 5 June – New South Wales Attorney-General Michael Daley announces Kathleen Folbigg had been pardoned and would be released from the Clarence Correctional Centre in Grafton, New South Wales where she had been imprisoned for 20 years. When making the announcement, Daley releases the summary findings prepared by an inquiry led by Justice Thomas Bathurst into Folbigg's 2003 convictions of killing her four children.
- 6 June – As it attempts to curb inflation, the Reserve Bank of Australia again lifts the official cash rate by 0.25%. Now at 4.1% – it's the highest it's been for eleven years.
- 7 June – Fraser Island is officially renamed K'gari.
- 8 June –
  - Justice Robert Beech-Jones sentences Scott White to nine years imprisonment for the 1988 manslaughter of American mathematician Scott Johnson.
  - Roger Cook is officially sworn in as the new premier of Western Australia following the resignation of Mark McGowan.
- 11 June – Multiple people are killed in a major late night bus crash near the town of Greta in the New South Wales Hunter Valley as it was returning to Singleton after a wedding at a local vineyard.
- 14 June – Independent senator Lidia Thorpe uses parliamentary privilege in The Senate to accuse Liberal Party senator David Van of inappropriate behaviour. Although Thorpe later returns to withdraw the remarks citing standing orders, her accusations prompt more women including former Liberal senator Amanda Stoker to come forward to raise further allegations against Van, all of which he strongly denies. After he is removed from the Liberal Party's party room by Peter Dutton following the allegations, Van resigns from the Liberal Party and moves to the crossbench, although Dutton encourages Van to resign from parliament altogether. In his resignation letter to the Victorian branch president Greg Mirabella, Van complains about not being afforded procedural fairness.
- 19 June – The Constitution Alteration (Aboriginal and Torres Strait Islander Voice) 2023 bill passes The Senate, enabling Prime Minister Anthony Albanese to set a date for the 2023 Australian Indigenous Voice referendum.
- 20 June – Nestlé announces its decision to stop manufacturing Allen's Fantales, citing declining sales and the need for expensive upgrades at its factory to continue making the product.
- 22 June – Queensland's oldest winery, the heritage-listed Romavilla Winery at Roma is destroyed by fire.
- 27 June - Sydney drug lord Alen Moradian, 48, who held high-level links to the Comanchero bikie gang, was shot dead in an underground carpark at Bondi Junction.
- 29 June – Former New South Wales premier Gladys Berejiklian and former state MP Daryl Maguire are found to have engaged in serious corrupt conduct while in office, according to findings handed down by the Independent Commission Against Corruption stemming from Operation Keppel.

=== July ===
- 1 July – The country's first Indigenous Australian surgeon Kelvin Kong is named as NAIDOC Person of the Year at the 2023 NAIDOC Awards in Brisbane.
- 3 July – Indonesian president Joko Widodo arrives in Sydney for a 36-hour visit to Australia during which he meets with business and political leaders including prime minister Anthony Albanese.
- 7 July – The findings from the Royal Commission into the Robodebt Scheme are released to the public. The report includes 57 recommendations with Commissioner Catherine Holmes describing the unlawful robodebt scheme as "an ill-conceived, embryonic idea" with a number of individuals being referred to the Australian Federal Police, the National Anti-Corruption Commission, the Australian Law Society and the Australian Public Service Commission for criminal and civil prosecution.
- 8 July – 22-year-old Queensland sailor Xavier Doerr is rescued in the Great Australian Bight by the bulk carrier Theodore JR after activating his emergency beacon at 5 pm the previous afternoon after his 6.4-metre Mini Transat yacht Waterline struck severe weather. Doerr was attempting to break the records for the fastest solo and fastest non-stop circumnavigation of Australia.
- 9 July – Australian prime minister Anthony Albanese arrives in Germany ahead of his attendance at the NATO summit in Lithuania. Ahead of a scheduled meeting with German chancellor Olaf Scholz, Albanese confirms a deal to sell Australian-made armoured vehicles to Germany.
- 10 July – Federal transport minister Catherine King denies an application by Qatar Airways to add more flights to Australia due to national interest concerns.
- 12 July – Neurosurgeon Charlie Teo is found guilty of unsatisfactory professional conduct by the Health Care Complaints Commission.
- 14 July – Michele Bullock is announced as Philip Lowe's successor as the Reserve Bank of Australia governor when his term expires in September.
- 15 July – The 2023 Fadden by-election is held with the LNP retaining the Gold Coast-based federal seat after Cameron Caldwell is elected to succeed Stuart Robert.
- 17 July – A 23-year-old woman is mauled by a pack of dingoes while jogging on K'gari. The latest dingo attack prompts a debate about how to manage the issues surrounding K'gari's dingo population including the behaviour of tourists.
- 18 July – Victorian premier Daniel Andrews announces the state can no longer host the 2026 Commonwealth Games, citing costs.
- 21 July – Three people are killed in a three-vehicle car crash at Federal on the Sunshine Coast which police allege to be a domestic violence-related homicide.
- 22 July – The biennial joint Exercise Talisman Sabre military exercise between Australia and the United States commences in Queensland. As the exercise gets underway, a People's Liberation Army Navy Dongdiao Class Auxiliary General Intelligence vessel is identified, with authorities expecting it to anchor off the Central Queensland coast in an attempt to collect sensitive military information.
- 26 July – The prime ministers of Australia and New Zealand, Anthony Albanese and Chris Hipkins, hold talks in Wellington as part of the annual Australia-New Zealand leader's meeting.
- 28 July – A MRH-90 Taipan army helicopter carrying four Australian Defence Force personnel from the 6th Aviation Regiment crashes into the ocean near Hamilton Island while taking part in a two-helicopter training mission during Exercise Talisman Sabre. It's the second incident involving a Taipan army helicopter in four months, which raises more concerns regarding the safety of the fleet.
- 29 July –
  - The 2023 Rockingham state by-election is held in Western Australia following the resignation of state premier Mark McGowan. Despite a considerable swing against Labor, the election is won by party's candidate Magenta Marshall.
  - Four people eat a beef wellington pie in the 2023 Leongatha mushroom murders with poisonous mushrooms, three of whom die a few days later.
- 30 July – Indonesia suspends imports of live Australian cattle from several export facilities after LSD is detected in livestock shipped from Australia.

=== August ===
- 1 August – A 45-year-old Gold Coast childcare worker is charged with 1,623 child abuse offences including 136 counts of rape and 604 counts of indecent treatment of a child. The offences were allegedly committed between 2007 and 2022.
- 2 August –
  - New South Wales premier Chris Minns stands down Member for Hunter Tim Crakanthorp from state cabinet and refers him to the Independent Commission Against Corruption after he fails to declare significant family holdings.
  - The Australian War Memorial in Canberra unveils a statue of nurse Lieutenant Colonel Vivian Bullwinkel – the first statue to be installed at the memorial to depict a woman.
- 4 August –
  - After a long-running trade war, China announces it would be dropping the 80% tariffs on Australian barley which had been introduced in May 2020, widely considered as retaliation against Australia's calls for an enquiry into the origins of COVID-19.
  - The annual Garma Festival of Traditional Cultures begins in Arnhem Land with the theme of "Djambatj (Yolngu excellence)".
- 6 August – A 34-year-old man and his five children, aged between 3 and 11, are killed in a house fire on Russell Island, near Brisbane.
- 8 August –
  - The Australian Federal Police reveal that 13 Australian children have been removed from danger while 19 men have been charged with child abuse offences in Operation Bakis, which was set up after an elaborate international child abuse network was uncovered on the dark web following the 2021 murder of two FBI agents in Florida who were killed while serving a search warrant on the home of pedophile David Lee Huber.
  - The Roger Cook Labor Government of Western Australia announces the Aboriginal Cultural Heritage Act 2021 would be repealed and the 1972 act reinstated.
  - Killing of Tayla and Murphy Cox in Park Avenue, Queensland, by Matthew James Cox.
- 11 August –
  - The Australian Federal Police seizes 560 kilograms of cocaine worth approximately $224 million after a raid on a house in Kalbarri, Western Australia.
  - Queensland's Department of Environment and Science advises that a number of camping areas on K'gari would be temporarily closed to reduce the interaction between dingoes and humans after two women were attacked in separate incidents on 10 August.
- 10 August – A Southern Cross Austereo television sales executive is charged with two counts of murder (domestic violence) after the bodies of his wife and 11-week old daughter are discovered at a property in the Rockhampton suburb of Park Avenue two days after their deaths.
- 14 August – One Nation Leader Pauline Hanson intervenes in the New South Wales state branch of the party, and removes Mark Latham as leader of the party in New South Wales.
- 15 August –
  - A grave is exhumed at the cemetery in Doomadgee, Queensland after the body of a respected Gangalidda elder who was thought to have been buried on 9 August was discovered to be still in the morgue at Doomadgee Hospital. It's discovered an empty coffin had been buried during the funeral instead, which leads to much criticism of the hospital.
  - Four Australian surfers and two Indonesian crew members are rescued after spending 36 hours at sea off the coast of Indonesia's Aceh province after their boat sunk during bad weather.
- 17 August –
  - The 49th Australian Labor Party national conference gets underway in Brisbane.
  - A magistrate finds Hillsong Church founder Brian Houston not guilty of concealing a serious indictable offence, concluding he had a reasonable excuse for not reporting his father Frank Houston's sexual abuse of a child as he reasonably believed the victim, by then aged in his 30's, didn't want the matter reported to police.
- 18 August –
  - Ceremonies are held throughout Australia to mark 50 years since the end of Australia's involvement in the Vietnam War.
  - The 2023 Queensland Bush Summit is held in Rockhampton and is attended by Queensland premier Annastacia Palaszczuk and mining magnate Gina Rinehart. In her speech, Palaszczuk says her government would be introducing legislation to guarantee the future of Glenden, a town which was destined to be demolished. Local rural landholders also gather at the event, protesting the construction of a number of renewable energy projects.
- 19 August – The Victorian Government agrees to pay $280 million in compensation to Commonwealth Games bodies after withdrawing from hosting the games in 2026.
- 22 August –
  - Almost thirty years after AC/DC's manager Crispin Dye was attacked and killed in Sydney, a new person of interest is identified during the special Commission of Inquiry into LGBTIQ hate crimes, after DNA found on Dye's jeans matches DNA collected from another crime scene.
  - Mark Latham quits One Nation to sit as an independent in the New South Wales upper house, and accuses the party's head office of misusing taxpayer funds which Pauline Hanson denies.
- 23 August –
  - The Australasian Fire Authorities Council releases its seasonal outlook which identifies large parts of Queensland, New South Wales and the Northern Territory as well as parts of South Australia and Victoria as being at an increased risk of a "significant bushfire".
  - The 2023 NAPLAN results are released. Assessed under a stricter criteria, the results indicate 10% of Australian school students aren't meeting minimum numeracy and literacy expectations.
  - Gold Coast City Council councillor Ryan Bayldon-Lumsden is charged with the murder of his step-father, LNP identity Robert Lumsden whose body was discovered at a property in Arundel. Bayldon-Lumsden is released on bail on 31 August with a $250,000 surety.
- 24 August –
  - Former school principal Malka Leifer is sentenced in Melbourne to 15 years in prison with a non-parole period of 11 years and six months for sexually abusing two sisters at the Adass Israel School from 2004 to 2007, after having been found guilty in the County Court in April 2023 of 18 charges of sexual assault.
  - 21 people are arrested when Victoria Police raid an illegal casino operating out of a factory in the Melbourne suburb of Truganina.
- 25 August – A 44-year-old surfer suffers serious injuries after being attacked by a shark at Port Macquarie on the Mid North Coast.
- 26 August – Nicole Werner wins the 2023 Warrandyte state by-election increasing the Liberals' primary vote by 10%, while runner-up Tomas Lightbody increases the Greens' primary vote by 6.8%. With the Labor choosing not to field a candidate, Werner picks up a +16.8 swing on a two-candidate preferred vote with 71.1% of the vote, while Lightbody picks up a +28.9 swing for the Greens with 28.9% of the vote.
- 27 August –
  - Three United States Marines are killed in the Tiwi Islands when an MV-22B Osprey carrying 23 personnel crashes on Melville Island.
  - A 33-year-old man from Gympie is charged with one count of arson after a church in Rockhampton is completely destroyed by fire.
- 28 August –
  - Assistant federal treasurer Stephen Jones claims Catherine King's decision to block an application by Qatar Airways for additional flights to Australia was to protect the sustainability of Qantas. However, King insists that no individual factor that influenced her decision.
  - Outgoing Qantas CEO Alan Joyce faces a senate select committee where he faces hostile questioning relating to the airline's credibility.
- 30 August – Prime minister Anthony Albanese officially announces 14 October 2023 as the date of the 2023 Australian Indigenous Voice referendum at a Yes rally in the Adelaide suburb of Elizabeth where he appeared alongside South Australian premier Peter Malinauskas.
- 31 August – The Australian Competition & Consumer Commission launches legal action against Qantas for allegedly selling airline tickets for thousands of cancelled flights within a three-month period in 2022.

=== September ===
- 3 September – In an interview on Sky News Australia, federal opposition leader Peter Dutton vows that if elected at the next election he would seek to hold a second referendum if the Yes campaign loses the 2023 Australian Indigenous Voice referendum – but it would be a vote on constitutional rights rather than a voice to parliament. His comments prompt much criticism.
- 4 September – After a two-day trial in the ACT Supreme Court, two men are found guilty by a jury of deliberately lighting the fire which caused extensive damage to the front of Old Parliament House on 30 December 2021.
- 6 September –
  - An emergency signal is detected off the Far North Queensland coast, originating from an inflatable 9-metre catamaran which had sustained damage from attacks by cookiecutter sharks. The vessel belonging to the Russian Geographical Society was carrying two Russians and a Frenchman attempting to circumnavigate the world. They were rescued by a nearby cargo ship.
  - Prime Minister Anthony Albanese attends the ASEAN Summit in Jakarta.
  - Alan Joyce steps down from his role as chief executive officer of Qantas two months early, citing recent controversies surrounding the airline, stating: "The best thing I can do under these circumstances is to bring forward my retirement and hand over to Vanessa and the new management team now, knowing they will do an excellent job."
- 7 September – After being continually pressed on her decision to reject an application by Qatar Airways to add additional flights to Australia, federal transport minister Catherine King admits the invasive searches of Australian women in Doha in 2020 was "a factor" in her decision, but insists it wasn't the only factor.
- 8 September –
  - Australia's longest serving female senator Marise Payne announces her retirement from politics after being in the Australian Senate since replacing Bob Woods in 1997.
  - Prime Minister Anthony Albanese meets with Philippines president Bongbong Marcos in Manila during the first bilateral visit by an Australian prime minister in two decades.
  - One person is killed and five are injured when a car ploughs through pedestrians and two other vehicles in Melbourne. The driver is arrested at the scene.
- 13 September – Qantas loses its challenge to a court ruling that it had illegally outsourced 1,700 jobs at ten Australian airports during the COVID-19 pandemic, with seven High Court judges rejecting the company's appeal against a Federal Court ruling in 2021.
- 14 September – Macquarie Bank announces it will commence phasing out over-the-counter cash and cheque transactions as well as its telephone banking service in 2024.
- 18 September – Three people are taken to hospital after a mass stabbing at Australian National University in Canberra. The attacker has been detained.
- 21 September – Anthony Albanese announces an independent inquiry into the handling of the COVID-19 pandemic in Australia, led by former public servant Robyn Kruk, infectious diseases expert Catherine Bennett and economist Angela Jackson. However, the exclusion of state and territory governments from the scope of the inquiry draws much criticism.
- 24 September – Chief Minister of the Northern Territory Natasha Fyles was allegedly assaulted with a cream-covered pancake by a member of the public at the Sunday markets at Nightcliff.
- 27 September – Jacinta Allan becomes the Premier of Victoria after Daniel Andrews retires.
- 28 September –
  - Federal defence minister Richard Marles announces that 500 Australian troops would be relocated to Townsville over the course of six years from 2025 to ensure the Australian Army is more focused on conducting missions in the Pacific. However, the move is criticised by the city's mayor Jenny Hill who claims her council was not consulted about where the soldiers would be housed.
  - The Queensland Police Service indicates that inquiries will be made into whether a serving police officer breached social media guidelines after he posted a photo to Instagram of himself, Ben Roberts-Smith and Zachary Rolfe spending time together in Bali.
- 29 September –
  - Federal defence minister Richard Marles announces Australia's fleet of MRH-90 Taipan helicopters will not be returning to flying operations and would be retired more than a year early, following the fatal crash during Exercise Talisman Sabre in July which killed four Australian Defence Force personnel.
  - The final report by the Royal Commission into Violence, Abuse, Neglect and Exploitation of People with Disability is tabled in federal parliament with 222 recommendations made for change. One of the key recommendations is to phase out all Australian special schools by 2051 with no new enrolments accepted after 2032 with all commissioners agreeing segregation of students with disabilities should end.
  - Attorney-General of Tasmania Elise Archer resigns from parliament and the Tasmanian Liberal Party after premier Jeremy Rockliff asks for and receives her resignation when allegations emerged of Archer being involved in bullying and inappropriate behaviour.
- 30 September – A man is killed when the boat he was in collided with a whale near Cape Banks at La Perouse.

=== October ===
- 2 October –
  - A woman receives serious leg injuries after being bitten by a shark while swimming at Beachport, South Australia.
  - Early voting begins for the 2023 Australian Indigenous Voice referendum.
- 3 October –
  - New laws come into effect in Queensland allowing the media to name and publicly identify accused rapists and those charged with sexual offences prior to trial. This leads to the eventual naming of former Liberal Party senior adviser Bruce Lehrmann as the "high profile man" accused of raping a woman in Toowoomba in October 2021. A former Gold Coast childcare worker charged on 1 August 2023 with more than 1,600 child sex offences is also named and identified as Ashley Paul Griffith.
  - At least three homes are destroyed when a bushfire burns more than 5,000 hectares of land at Coolagolite in the Bega Valley.
- 4 October – Flood warnings are issues for several communities in Victoria's Gippsland region after heavy rain causes major flooding in the Macalister River.
- 5 October – The Royal Australian Mint officially unveils new $1 coins featuring an effigy of Charles III, to replace those with the effigy of Elizabeth II.
- 6 October – A 65-year-old pilot and his three grandchildren, aged between 6 and 11, are killed when their light plane crashes near Gundaroo in New South Wales' Southern Tablelands en route from Canberra to Armidale.
- 7 October – A week before the 2023 Australian Indigenous Voice referendum is held, prime minister Anthony Albanese casts his vote early at a pre-poll booth at Marrickville Town Hall.
- 8 October – Following the Re'im music festival massacre by Hamas in Israel as part of the Gaza war, a pro-Palestinian rally takes place in Lakemba in south-west Sydney during which Sheikh Ibrahim Dadoun described attacks on Israel by Hamas as an act of resistance. The comments earn a rebuke from prime minister Anthony Albanese, foreign minister Penny Wong, opposition leader Peter Dutton and co-CEO of the Executive Council of Australian Jewry Alexander Ryvchin who all condemned the rally and the comments made.
- 9 October –
  - Various Australian landmarks, including the Sydney Opera House, Parliament House in Canberra and Brisbane's Story Bridge, the Melbourne Cricket Ground, and the Adelaide Oval, are illuminated with blue and white colours to show support to Australia's Jewish community and to the people of Israel following an attack by militant group Hamas.
  - After a march through the streets of Sydney, a pro-Palestinian rally is held at the Sydney Opera House during which flares were thrown and anti-Jewish phrases were chanted.
- 11 October –
  - Journalist Cheng Lei returns to Australia after being detained in China for three years since being arrested in August 2020 while working for CGTN, accused of supplying state secrets.
  - A 66-year-old Sydney-born grandmother is confirmed as the first known Australian to be killed in the attacks in Israel by terrorist group Hamas.
- 13 October –
  - 238 Australians are successfully evacuated from Israel on a Qantas mercy flight from Tel Aviv to London after the attacks by Hamas in Israel.
  - The New South Wales government announces it will implement all five recommendations made in the Bus Industry Taskforce's initial safety report following the Hunter Valley bus crash in June, which killed ten people.
- 14 October – Australians vote in the 2023 Australian Indigenous Voice referendum, where the majority voted against establishing an Aboriginal and Torres Strait Islander Voice in the constitution, with the proposal failing to garner sufficient support to pass.
- 18 October – Glencore announces it will close all copper mining at Mount Isa in 2025.
- 19 October –
  - Following the 2023 Australian Indigenous Voice referendum, Queensland's LNP opposition leader David Crisafulli announces his party will be dropping its support for a state-based Treaty, despite having earlier supported a Treaty in early 2023.
  - Tim Mathieson, former partner of Julia Gillard, is convicted of sexual assault and fined $7000 in Melbourne Magistrates Court.
- 21 October –
  - Thousands of pro-Palestine protestors attend rallies throughout Australia to show their support for Palestinians in Gaza.
  - Wollongong mayor Gordon Bradbery is condemned by Jewish groups for comments he made at a local pro-Palestine rally. The NSW Jewish Board of Deputies accuse Bradbery of seeking to justify the 7 October attack and describe his comments as "reprehensible and irresponsible in the extreme" which caused some local residents to be "disturbed and appalled".
  - Western Australia local government elections are held with Basil Zempilas re-elected as Lord Mayor of Perth.
  - Local government elections are held in the Shire of Christmas Island and the Shire of Cocos (Keeling) Islands.
- 22 October – An open letter purportedly written by Indigenous leaders, describes the result of 2023 Australian Indigenous Voice referendum as "appalling and mean-spirited" and attributes the loss to a lack of bipartisanship, racism and lies in political advertising.
- 23 October – Prime Minister Anthony Albanese arrives in Washington, D.C. for a four-day visit and prepares to meet with members of congress and president of the United States Joe Biden.
- 25 October – Two people were killed, and more than five buildings were destroyed in more than forty out-of-control bushfires across the Darling Downs, Queensland.
- 28 October – Emergency evacuation orders for the towns of Tara, Wieambilla and The Gums are in place as more than 32 buildings have been destroyed due to the ongoing Darling Downs bushfires.
- 31 October – Football Australia formally end their bid to host the 2034 FIFA World Cup, leaving Saudi Arabia as the only confirmed bid before FIFA's deadline for declarations of interest expires.

=== November ===
- 1 November –
  - Islamic terrorist Abdul Nacer Benbrika won his High Court (In a 6–1 decision) bid to restore his Australian citizenship, which was cancelled in 2020.
  - A 10-year-old boy is killed after becoming trapped under an elevator at St Lucy's School – a Catholic school for students with disabilities in the Sydney suburb of Wahroonga.
- 3 November –
  - A 49-year-old woman faces court in Morwell, Victoria after having been charged the previous day with three counts of murder and five counts of attempted murder in a suspected case of mushroom poisoning during a family lunch she allegedly hosted at her home in Leongatha. The case is adjourned until May 2024.
  - A state funeral is held at St Mary's Church in Ipswich, Queensland for former governor-general and Labor Party leader Bill Hayden.
  - Qantas shareholders vote against an executive pay deal at the company's annual general meeting in Melbourne, with chairman Richard Goyder heckled by company shareholders.
- 4 November –
  - Three members of an aerial firefighting crew are killed when their firefighting aircraft crashes near Cloncurry, Queensland while en route from Toowoomba to Mount Isa to map areas of recent bushfires.
  - Prime Minister Anthony Albanese arrives in China for a three-day visit in which he will meet with Chinese president Xi Jinping and premier Li Qiang.
- 5 November – A car ploughs through a beer garden in Daylesford, Victoria, killing five people and injuring four others.
- 6 November —
  - The Australian Greens stage a walkout of The Senate during Question Time with senator Mehreen Faruqi leading the boycott in protest of the Federal Government's response to the conflict in Gaza.
  - Australia International Radio is officially launched.
- 7 November —
  - The Reserve Bank of Australia lifts the official cash rate to 4.35% - the highest level since November 2011.
  - Prime Minister Anthony Albanese arrives in the Cook Islands for the Pacific Islands Forum.
- 8 November —
  - The Optus telecommunications network experiences a widespread national outage which affects customers, businesses, hospitals, emergency services and rail networks.
  - The High Court of Australia rules that the practice of detaining asylum seekers and refugees in Australia is illegal, with 80 people released immediately into the community including several sex offenders and at least three murderers, including Sirul Azhar Umar who was convicted of the murder of Shaariibuugiin Altantuyaa.
- 10 November —
  - Violent clashes between pro-Israeli and pro-Palestinian groups occur in the Melbourne suburb of Caulfield South prompting the evacuation of a synagogue and a Shabbat service to be abandoned. Free Palestine Melbourne apologised for protesting in such close proximity to a synagogue but said it was not their intention to intimidate Jewish worshippers. Victorian premier Jacinta Allan said it was unacceptable for people to feel unsafe to go to their places of worship, while state opposition leader John Pesutto called the behaviour of protestors "absolutely disgusting".
  - The bodies of two boys, aged two and three, are discovered hours apart in the same disused car in Woorabinda, Queensland with early investigations suggesting they may have died from suspected heat-related stress.
- 11 November — Australians observe the 105th Remembrance Day. A war memorial in the Melbourne suburb of Montrose needed to be cleaned before the local Remembrance Day service after it is vandalised with pro-Palestine graffiti the night before.
- 12 November — For the fifth consecutive week, large crowds gather in Australian capital cities for pro-Palestinian rallies including in Sydney's Hyde Park, with protestors calling for a ceasefire in Gaza.
- 14 November — Divers from HMAS Toowoomba operating in international waters off Japan sustain minor injuries from sonar pulses emanating from a Chinese warship.
- 16 November — A 67-year-old Scenic Rim man dies in a ramped ambulance after waiting three hours to be admitted to Ipswich Hospital. His death prompts the man's family to call for urgent reforms to Queensland's health system.
- 17 November — Optus CEO Kelly Bayer Rosmarin fronts a Senate inquiry into the company's national network outage on 8 November, where she admitted 228 Triple Zero calls were unable to be answered during the outage.
- 18 November —
  - A 52-year-old Brisbane woman dies after she had waited more than 90 minutes for an ambulance. Calling Triple Zero after experiencing chest pains just before 10:30pm the night before, she gets tired of waiting and cancels the ambulance just before midnight. She is found dead by her son the following morning, prompting her sister to call on the state government to invest more money into the state's health system.
  - The 18-year-old son of South Australian police commissioner Grant Stevens dies at the Flinders Medical Centre after sustaining an irreversible brain injury in an alleged hit and run at Goolwa Beach the previous evening. The car was allegedly driven by an 18-year-old Encounter Bay who was subsequently charged with causing death by dangerous driving, aggravated driving without due care, leaving the scene of a crash after causing death and failing to truly answer questions.
- 19 November — Two Viper S-211 Marchetti planes conducting a formation flight collide in mid-air. One plane manages to make it back to Essendon Airport, but the other plunges into Port Phillip Bay killing the two people on board - the pilot and a television camera operator. The plane's wreckage is found by emergency services on 21 November.
- 20 November — Kelly Bayer Rosmarin resigns as Optus CEO following the 2023 Optus outage on 8 November, and following the 2022 Optus data breach following a cyberattack in 2022.
- 22 November —
  - The Rookwood Weir, the largest weir to be built in Australia since World War II, is completed on the Fitzroy River, west of Rockhampton.
  - The 2023 Wanneroo bushfire starts north of Perth, which will subsequently destroy or damage dozens of homes over the ensuing days.
  - A 14-year-old high school student manages to stop a runaway bus from colliding with a busy petrol station in Casino, New South Wales.
- 23 November — The remains of the baby at the centre of the notorious "baby in the post" cold case from 1965 are exhumed at a cemetery in Darwin in the hope of investigators finding a DNA match with the 53-year-old daughter of NTFL player Jimmy Anderson, who some investigators suspected was the intended recipient of the parcel sent from Melbourne.
- 25 November — Hundreds of protesters commence a 30-hour blockade, blocking the shipping channel leading into the Port of Newcastle in a protest organised by climate group Rising Tide, objecting to the Federal Government approving new fossil fuel projects.
- 26 November —
  - The Rozelle Interchange in Sydney opens to traffic for the first time.
  - Dave Sharma is selected by the Liberal Party to fill the vacancy in the Senate left by Marise Payne, beating candidates such as Andrew Constance and Zed Seselja.
  - 109 protestors, including a 97-year-old Uniting Church minister, are arrested for defying orders to leave the Port of Newcastle by 5pm, at the conclusion of the 30-hour blockade by Rising Tide to protest the Federal Government approving new fossil fuel projects.
- 27 November — Home Affairs secretary Mike Pezzullo is sacked by the governor-general, after an independent inquiry finds Pezzullo breached the government's code of conduct at least 14 times.
- 28 November — Labor senator for Western Australia Pat Dodson announces he plans to retire from federal politics on Australia Day, citing his treatment for cancer.
- 29 November — A state funeral is held for former federal Labor minister Gerry Hand at St Ignatius' Church, Richmond.

=== December ===
- 1 December —
  - The FBI arrest a 58-year-old man in Arizona as part of the investigation into the Wieambilla shootings on 12 December 2022.
  - A 20-year-old man who lost control of the vehicle he was driving and crashed, killing his five teenage passengers in Buxton on 6 September 2022 is sentenced to the maximum 12 years jail with a non-parole period of seven years.
  - A 41-year-old convicted drug trafficker is sentenced to ten years in prison and declared a serious violent offender after the car she was driving crashed head-on into an Australia Post truck at 164 km/h on the Bruce Highway between Mackay and Rockhampton on 21 June 2022, killing the 62-year-old truck driver.
- 2 December —
  - Two former detainees released into the community following the High Court of Australia's ruling that indefinite immigration detention in Australia was unlawful are arrested in separate incidents - a 65-year-old man is arrested for allegedly assaulting a woman in Adelaide while a 45-year-old man is arrested for allegedly being in possession of drugs in Sydney.
- 3 December — Approximately thirty people in masks use Eureka Day to hold a white supremacist march in the Victorian city of Ballarat, prompting outrage from the local community.
- 4 December —
  - A severe hail storm causes damage to property and farming crops in the Fraser Coast, Sunshine Coast and Gympie regions of Queensland, with Gympie affected the worst.
  - Approximately $40,000 in cash is discovered scattered along the Mitchell Freeway in Perth. Police attending the incident conducted a search of a vehicle where they seized 51 grams of cocaine as well as $8,000 in cash. They arrested a 34-year-old man was charged with possession of cocaine with intent to sell or supply, possession of stolen or unlawfully obtained property and having no authority to drive.
- 5 December —
  - A third former immigration detainee who was released into the community after the High Court's ruling that indefinite immigration in Australia was unlawful is arrested in Melbourne. The 33-year-old registered sex offender is charged with nine counts of breaching his reporting obligations, which includes allegedly creating social media accounts and contacting children.
  - The Federal Government begins to rush preventative detention laws through Federal Parliament to give judges the power to cancel the Australian citizenship of serious offenders and to preventively detain some non-citizens released after the High Court's ruling that indefinite detention in Australia is unlawful.
  - Cyclone Jasper becomes the first cyclone of the 2023–24 Australian region cyclone season.
  - Strathbogie Shire Council in Victoria is suspended by local government minister Melissa Horne, with municipal monitor Peter Stephensen appointed as the council's interim administrator. The suspension will apply until the 2024 Victorian local elections.
- 6 December —
  - A fourth former immigration detainee released following the High Court ruling that indefinite immigration in Australia was unlawful is arrested - a 45-year-old man is arrested in Melbourne and charged with one count of theft and one count of failing to comply with a curfew with the Australian Federal Police alleging he breached the conditions of his visa.
  - Attorney-General Mark Dreyfus, Immigration minister Andrew Giles and home affairs minister Clare O'Neil hold a joint press conference to discuss Labor's proposed preventative detention laws. Responding to a question by Sky News journalist Olivia Caisley, Dreyfus rejects the notion the government owes an apology to Australians allegedly assaulted by those released under the High Court's decision. Dreyfus, who described Caisley's question as "absurd", is criticised for the way he spoke to Caisley, prompting him to apologise to her in private.
- 7 December — A fifth former immigration detainee released into the community following the High Court ruling that indefinite immigration in Australia was unlawful is arrested by police in Queensland after it was discovered that was an outstanding warrant for allegedly breaching parole conditions prior to entering immigration detention in 2012, after having been jailed for assault.
- 10 December —
  - Queensland premier Annastacia Palaszczuk announces she is retiring from politics and will resign as premier at the end of the week. Her successor will be decided by the Labor caucus at the 2023 Queensland Labor Party leadership election on 15 December 2023.
  - Western Australian premier Roger Cook, deputy premier Rita Saffioti, federal minister for Northern Australia Madeleine King, state MP Divina D'Anna and local Indigenous community members all officially reopen the Fitzroy River bridge in The Kimberley restoring an important transport link after the bridge was destroyed in the state's worst floods in January 2023.
- 11 December — The Federal Government unveils its 10-year migration strategy which includes increasing minimum English language requirements for international students and tightening visa processes for migrant workers.
- 12 December —
  - A 51-year-old Fire and Rescue New South Wales firefighter dies while fighting a house fire in the Sydney suburb of Grose Vale.
  - A young boy and a man in his 30's are killed when the light plane they were in clipped powerlines and crashed on a rural property next to the Clarence River at Lilydale near Grafton, New South Wales.
- 13 December —
  - It's announced that Australia will ban the use, supply and manufacturing of engineered stone from 1 July 2024 following a Safe Work Australia report which found the rates of silicosis and silica-related diseases had risen substantially particularly among engineered stone workers.
  - Cyclone Jasper makes landfall as a Category 2 cyclone near Wujal Wujal in Far North Queensland bringing strong winds, heavy rain, flooding and power outages to the region. The subsequent widespread flooding throughout Far North Queensland over the ensuing days force some residents onto rooftops, including patients at the Wujal Wujal Hospital, awaiting rescue. The entire town of Wujal Wujal is evacuated and Cairns becomes completely isolated due to the closures of highways into the city and the inundation of the Cairns Airport.
- 14 December —
  - Following her pardon in June, Kathleen Folbigg's convictions for killing her four children are overturned with the New South Wales Court of Criminal Appeal ruling her convictions be quashed.
  - Legislation is passed in United States Congress which allows nuclear-powered submarines to be sold to Australia under the AUKUS agreement.
  - The Australian Financial Review names Gina Rinehart as Business Person of the Year.
- 15 December —
  - Steven Miles is sworn in as the 40th premier of Queensland by governor Jeannette Young, after being elected unopposed at the Labor caucus meeting. Cameron Dick is sworn in as the state's deputy premier.
  - A state memorial is held for Barry Humphries at the Sydney Opera House.
  - Vodafone Australia becomes the first major telecommunications company to shut down its 3G network in Australia.
  - Kirsty Bryant becomes the first woman in Australia to give birth to a baby from a transplanted uterus.
- 18 December — A woman is found dead with apparent stab wounds in the commercial kitchen area at the National Zoo & Aquarium in Canberra. A 29-year-old co-worker is subsequently charged with her murder during a bedside hearing the following day at Canberra Hospital to which he pleads not guilty. The man is refused bail and is expected to appear in court again in April 2024.
- 19 December —
  - Chief minister of the Northern Territory Natasha Fyles resigns.
  - A 32-year Australian reserves captain is killed in an ambush by Gaza militants in Southern Gaza while fighting for the Israel Defense Forces in the Gaza war.
  - Convicted terrorist Abdul Nacer Benbrika is released into the community after Victorian Supreme Court Justice Elizabeth Hollingworth grants his release on an extended supervision order.
  - The 80th anniversary of the Canal Creek air crash is commemorated at Canal Creek, Queensland.
- 20 December —
  - Charles Vincent Read, the 24-year-old son of Chopper Read is sentenced to 15 months jail in the Hobart Magistrates Court after pleading guilty to several charges including burglary, stealing and driving while disqualified.
  - The Labor caucus in the Northern Territory unanimously decide that Eva Lawler will be the next chief minister with Chansey Paech becoming the new deputy chief minister following the resignation of Natasha Fyles.
  - A federal court ruling sees Airbnb fined $15 million and ordered to pay up to $15 million in compensation for misleading to around 70,000 Australian customers between January 2018 and August 2021 by failing to make clear prices on the website were in USD and not AUD.
- 21 December —
  - Eva Lawler is sworn in as the 13th chief minister of the Northern Territory.
  - Homes are destroyed by a bushfire in the Perth suburb of Parkerville as other bushfires burn at Manjimup, Toodyay and Lancelin.
- 22—28 December — Sealed bricks of cocaine wash up on beaches in New South Wales prompting the state's crime command to commence an investigation.
- 24 December —
  - Anthony Albanese and Peter Dutton deliver the annual leaders' Christmas messages.
  - The annual Carols by Candlelight event at the Sidney Myer Music Bowl in Melbourne is disrupted by pro-Palestinian protestors. Children preparing to perform with Emma Memma are rushed off the stage for their own safety until security could intercept the protestors. One of the protestors, a 21-year-old woman is arrested and issued with an infringement notice for carrying a controlled weapon.
- 25 December — Severe storms sweep across South East Queensland bringing heavy rain, large hail, strong winds and causing power outages. One woman is killed by a falling tree. The severe weather prompts the Boxing Day closure of some of the Gold Coast's theme parks including Warner Bros. Movie World, Wet 'n' Wild, Dreamworld and WhiteWater World.
- 27 December — At least 10 people are killed during severe weather which brings thunderstorms and strong winds to the eastern states of Queensland and Victoria.
- 28 December —
  - Acting foreign affairs minister Mark Dreyfus confirms two Australian brothers were killed in an Israeli airstrike in southern Lebanon, after terrorist group Hezbollah claims one of the brothers had been fighting for them.
  - Yakult Australia confirms it has been the target of a cyberattack.
  - A 15-year-old Adelaide boy is killed in a shark attack while surfing on the Yorke Peninsula in South Australia.
- 29 December — The United Workers Union sends a report to Worksafe SA claiming workers at the Smith's factory in Adelaide have been experiencing adverse reactions from the seasoning used to flavour Doritos 'Flamin' Hot' corn chips. In response, PepsiCo say they consider the safety of its employees as a "top priority" and they have mandated mask wearing during the production process and will install additional extraction fans.
- 31 December — Two Port Augusta train drivers are killed when the Pacific National freight train they were driving collides with a truck on a level crossing on the Barrier Highway at Bindarrah near the South Australian border with New South Wales which results in a major derailment.

== Music, film, arts and literature ==
=== January ===
- 1 January –
  - Field Day is held at The Domain in Sydney where a total of 97 people are allegedly found in possession of illicit substances, with three people arrested for drug supply offences.
  - Blueback is released to cinemas.
- 11 January – Cate Blanchett wins Best Actress at the 80th Golden Globe Awards for her role in Tár.
- 15 January – Cate Blanchett wins Best Actress at the 28th Critics' Choice Awards for her role in Tár, but uses her acceptance speech to criticise the award, describing it as a "poor second" to a bottle of mouthwash Julia Roberts had given her, and accuses the film and television industry or promoting a "televised horse race".
- 21 January – The 51st Golden Guitar Awards are held in Tamworth. Casey Barnes wins Album of the Year and Top Selling Album of the Year for Light It Up. 10-year-old Tiggy Heart Eckersley becomes the youngest Golden Guitar winner, awarded for the Song of the Year "Star of the Show" which she co-wrote with her parents Brooke McClymont and Adam Eckersley and their friend Dan Biederman. Andrew Swift is named Male Artist of the Year while Amber Lawrence is named Female Artist of the Year.
- 22 January – The Sydney Harbour Bridge and Cahill Expressway are closed to allow filming of The Fall Guy starring Ryan Gosling and Emily Blunt.
- 26 January – True Spirit is released to selected Australian cinemas prior to its streaming on Netflix.
- 28 January – Flume tops the annual Triple J Hottest 100 with the song "Say Nothing" featuring Maya.

=== February ===
- 19 February – Cate Blanchett wins Best Actress in a Leading Role at the 76th BAFTAS for her role in Tár.
- 24 February – The winners of the 12th AACTA International Awards are announced. Among the Australian winners are Baz Luhrmann (Best Direction), Cate Blanchett (Best Actress), Mark Coles Smith (Best Actor in a Series) and Mystery Road: Origin (Best Drama Series).
- 26 February – A state memorial service is held in Melbourne for Olivia Newton-John who died in August 2022.

=== March ===
- 5 May – Julia Gutman is announced as the winner of the Archibald Prize for her portrait of Montaigne called Head in the sky, feet on the ground.
- 23 March –
  - Of an Age is released into Australian cinemas.
  - The Portable Door is released into Australian cinemas prior to streaming on Stan.

=== April ===
- 27 April – Sarah Holland-Batt wins the Stella Prize for her poetry collection entitled The Jaguar.

=== May ===
- 11–13 May – Progressive metal band Voyager represents Australia in the Eurovision Song Contest 2023 with the track "Promise", finishing in 9th place.
- 18 May – Limbo is released to Australian cinemas.

=== June ===
- 20 June – Li Cunxin announces he will retire as artistic director of Queensland Ballet at the end of the year.
- 28 June – Run Rabbit Run is released to Netflix.

=== July ===
- 6 July – The New Boy is released to Australian cinemas.
- 25 July – Shankari Chandran wins the Miles Franklin Award for Chai Time at Cinnamon Gardens
- 26 July – The Appleton Ladies' Potato Race premieres on Network 10 before streaming on Paramount+ from 27 July.

=== September ===
- 3 September – John Farnham agrees to allow his 1986 hit "You're the Voice" to be used as the soundtrack for the Yes campaign in the lead up to the 2023 Australian Indigenous Voice referendum.
- 28 September – Love Is in the Air becomes available for streaming on Netflix.

=== October ===
- 5 October – Shayda is released to Australian cinemas.
- 24 October – Alex Skovron wins the Patrick White Award.

=== November ===
- 2 November – Bring Him to Me is released to Australian cinemas.
- 14 November – The National Film and Sound Archive reveal the 2023 Sounds of Australia: "Anvil Chorus", Concerto of the Greater Sea, "Howzat", "I Am Australian", "I Only Came To Say Goodbye", "Menstruation Blues", "Slip-Slop-Slap", "Streets of Old Fitzroy", Sweet Nell of Old Drury, "Take Me To Your World", The Death of a Wombat and "The Loved One"
- 15 November –
  - The Australian National Dictionary Centre at the Australian National University selects "Matilda" as Australia's word of the year.
  - The 2023 ARIA Music Awards are held in Sydney where Genesis Owusu wins Album of the Year for Struggler and Troye Sivan is named Best Solo Artist for "Rush", which is also voted Song of the Year.
- 16 November – Jessica Au wins the Prime Minister's Literary Award for Fiction for her second novel Cold Enough for Snow.
- 23 November – Edmund Tadros and Neil Chenoweth win the Gold Walkley at the 68th Walkley Awards, for their coverage in the Australian Financial Review of the PwC tax scandal.

=== December ===
- 6 December – Guy Sebastian's former manager Titus Day who was found guilty by a jury in November 2022 of 34 fraud-related charges after allegedly embezzling $600,000 from Sebastian, has his conviction quashed and will be re-tried after winning an appeal in the Court of Criminal Appeal.
- 20 December – Leanne Benjamin is named as the new artistic director of Queensland Ballet, succeeding Li Cunxin who is retiring from the company.

== Television ==
=== January ===
- 16 January – Sarah Abo begins co-hosting the Nine Network's breakfast program Today, succeeding Allison Langdon.
- 28 January – Veteran Seven Network sports presenter Pat Welsh signs off after 47 years based at the network's Brisbane studio.
- 30 January –
  - Allison Langdon begins her tenure as the host of Nine's A Current Affair, succeeding Tracy Grimshaw who departed at the end of 2022.
  - Sam Mac is announced as the new host of Sydney Weekender, replacing Matt Shirvington.

=== February ===
- 27 February – After stepping down as the host of 7.30 in 2022, Leigh Sales returns to ABC TV as the new host of Australian Story which had been without a host since Caroline Jones left in 2016.
- 28 February –
  - New sketch show We Interrupt This Broadcast premieres on the Seven Network.
  - Australian comedian Reuben Kaye delivers a controversial joke about Jesus during an appearance on The Project which prompts widespread criticism, and prompts hosts Waleed Aly and Sarah Harris to apologise the following night for the offence it caused to Muslim and Christian viewers.

=== March ===
- 19 March – Indira Naidoo begins hosting the long-running Compass program on ABC TV, succeeding Geraldine Doogue.
- 26 March – Royston Sagigi-Baira wins the eighth season of Australian Idol with Phoebe Stewart the runner-up.
- 27 March – Olympic pole vaulter Liz Parnov wins Australian Survivor: Heroes V Villains.

=== April ===
- 12 April – The final edition of Spencer Gulf Nightly News goes to air prior to its axing by Southern Cross Austereo, leaving South Australians with no regional television news service.
- 17 April – An episode of animated series Bluey entitled "Exercise" prompts criticism and accusations of fat shaming, which leads to the episode being edited.
- 30 April – Former netballer Liz Ellis wins the ninth season of I'm a Celebrity...Get Me Out of Here! while boxer Harry Garside is runner-up. After flying back to Australia on 2 May, Garside is arrested by police at Sydney Airport and charged with assaulting his former partner on 1 March. The charges were withdrawn by police on 7 June.

=== May ===
- 1 May – The premiere of the fifteenth series of MasterChef Australia is pulled from the schedule by Network 10 just hours before it is due to air due to the sudden death of judge Jock Zonfrillo. After consultation with Zonfrillo's family, the series commences on 7 May 2023.
- 6 May – The ABC is heavily criticised for their coverage of the Coronation of Charles III and Camilla on ABC TV, during which they held a panel discussion featuring three anti-monarchists including Q+A host Stan Grant, Australian Republican Movement chair Craig Foster and Indigenous writer and lawyer Teela Reid, and one monarchist Julian Leeser. The panel discussion prompted more than 1,800 complaints from viewers and an ombudsman's investigation, which found no breach of impartiality standards during the coverage. Grant also received racial abuse after his appearance on the panel which prompted him to step back from hosting Q+A.

=== June ===
- 2 June – After losing his civil defamation trial, Ben Roberts-Smith resigns from Seven West Media. He had been the general manager of regional network Seven Queensland since July 2015 before also being appointed as general manager of Seven Brisbane in 2016.
- 9 June – After 21 years, David Koch co-hosts Seven Network breakfast program Sunrise for the final time. Koch is succeeded by Matt Shirvington.
- 17 June – The Australian Broadcasting Corporation's managing director David Anderson announces a major restructure of the organisation in the new financial year, resulting in the loss of 120 jobs, the Sunday evening state-based ABC News bulletins on ABC TV being replaced with a single national bulletin and the abolition of the ABC's arts team. Among those to lose their jobs was national political editor Andrew Probyn whose position is made redundant. The ABC is widely condemned for the decisions.
- 25 June – ABC TV's Sunday morning public affairs show Insiders signs off from the ABC's Melbourne studio for the final time, ahead of its relocation to the ABC's studio in Canberra.

=== July ===
- 10 July – The Seven Network announces they have signed a two-year deal with Hockey Australia to broadcast all internationally sanctioned games played by the Kookaburras and Hockeyroos as well as all matches of the Hockey One league throughout 2023 and 2024.
- 16 July – Brent Draper wins the 15th season of Masterchef Australia.
- 23 July –
  - Weekend Sunrise becomes the final live television program to broadcast from the Seven Network's Martin Place studios as the network completes its relocation to its Eveleigh headquarters. The final editions of Sunrise and The Morning Show from Martin Place aired on 21 July while the final Seven News Sydney bulletin from Martin Place aired on 25 June.
  - Phil Burton and dance partner Ash-Leigh Hunter win the twentieth series of Dancing with the Stars.
- 24 July – The ABC announces that Stan Grant will not be returning to host Q+A with Patricia Karvelas confirmed as the program's host for the remainder of the year. It is also announced Dan Bourchier would soon be hosting a special edition of Q+A from the Garma Festival.
- 30 July – Seven Network personality Sonia Kruger wins the Gold Logie at the 2023 Logie Awards held in Sydney. Kruger's win is criticised by several media commentators and Greens senator Mehreen Faruqi. All referred to Kruger's controversial remarks on the Nine Network's Today program in 2016 regarding immigration which the New South Wales Civil and Administrative Tribunal ruled as having vilified Muslims.

=== August ===
- 2 August –
  - After receiving much criticism, the Australian Broadcasting Corporation announces it has reversed its earlier decision, deciding to retain the Sunday evening editions of the state-based ABC News bulletins on ABC TV.
  - After last airing in 2009, improvised comedy show Thank God You're Here returns to Network 10 with new host Celia Pacquola.
- 4 August – Eddie McGuire announces that Millionaire Hot Seat, the afternoon game show he has hosted since its debut in 2009, will be going into hiatus in January 2024, to be replaced with a new program produced in Melbourne.
- 7 August – Australian animated children's program Bluey wins the TCA Award for Outstanding Achievement in Children's Programming at the 39th TCA Awards.
- 15 August – After last airing in 2016, Kitchen Cabinet hosted by Annabel Crabb returns to ABC TV.
- 16 August – The 2023 FIFA Women's World Cup semi-final between the Matildas and the Lionesses becomes the most watched television program since the OzTAM audience measuring commenced in 2001, with preliminary data showing a national average audience of 7.13 million watched the game.
- 23 August – The 2023 reimagining of ABC TV's sitcom Mother and Son debuts, attracting a national metro audience of 441,000 viewers.
- 24 August – Prime Minister Anthony Albanese officially opens the Seven Sydney's new newsroom and studio facility at the network's head office in South Eveleigh.
- 29 August – After having last aired in 2018, Network 10 reboots Shark Tank with a completely new cast of "sharks", consisting of Sabri Suby, Catriona Wallace, Davie Fogarty, Jane Lu, and Robert Herjavec.

=== September ===
- 6 September – Nine Entertainment holds their Upfronts in Sydney where they officially reveal the commentary teams for their Olympics and Paralympics coverage. The network also confirms a local version of Tipping Point hosted by Todd Woodbridge will air on Nine in 2024 as will a reboot of an Australian version of Jeopardy! Nine also confirms the return of former A Current Affair host Tracy Grimshaw in an undisclosed project.
- 7 September – The Australian Broadcasting Corporation admits it breached its own policies pertaining to the licensing of its archival television footage for political purposes after it's discovered the ABC's commercial arm licensed footage from the 1967 referendum to be used in Uluru Dialogue's advertisement for the 2023 referendum featuring John Farnham's hit song You're the Voice. That same footage was also inexplicably watermarked with a logo belonging to private company Australian Television Archive despite owner James Paterson stating that he had "nothing to do with the campaign, the agency or have any connection whatsoever to the footage our logo was placed on".
- 10 September – Juanita Phillips reads her final ABC News New South Wales bulletin on ABC TV in Sydney after 21 years. She is succeeded by Jeremy Fernandez.
- 18 September – Neighbours returns after more than a year off the air.

=== October ===
- 3 October – Identical twins Radha and Prabha win the thirteenth series of My Kitchen Rules.
- 8 October – Tarryn Stokes wins the twelfth season of The Voice.
- 18 October - Television journalist and former I'm a Celebrity...Get Me Out of Here! contestant Natasha Exelby appears in Melbourne Magistrates' Court, where she is fined $2000, disqualified from driving for 22 months and had her licence cancelled after crashing into a parked car at Toorak while having a BAC of .220. However, no conviction was recorded.
- 22 October – The Nine Network announces that the ABC's former political editor Andrew Probyn had joined Nine as national affairs editor.
- 24 October – Network 10 / Paramount ANZ hold their 2024 upfronts in Sydney where they reveal: Ready Steady Cook will be rebooted with Miguel Maestre as host; Deal of No Deal will be revived with Grant Denyer as host; new episodes of Wheel of Fortune will be filmed in the UK with Graham Norton as host; and Robert Irwin will co-host I'm a Celebrity...Get Me Out of Here! They also announce a new judging line up for MasterChef Australia with Poh Ling Yeow, Sofia Levin and Jean-Christophe Novelli joining returning judge Andy Allen. It's also announced Top Gear Australia will be rebooted to stream on Paramount+, hosted by Blair Joscelyne, Beau Ryan and Jonathan LaPaglia.

=== November ===
- 1 November – Foxtel closes its Foxtel Movies Kids channel.
- 7 November – Dami Im wins fifth season of The Masked Singer Australia. Darren Hayes is the runner-up and Conrad Sewell places third.
- 9 November – Darren McMullen and his nephew Tristan Dougan win The Amazing Race Australia: Celebrity Edition. They decide to share the $100,000 prize money with the other two charities nominated by the remaining two teams (Alli Simpson's team and Emma Watkins' team)
- 14 November – It's announced Network 10's morning program Studio 10 would be ending its 10-year run on 21 December 2023, after more than 2500+ editions.
- 18 November – The Nine Network announces that Alicia Loxley and Tom Steinfort would be replacing long-serving anchor Peter Hitchener as the weeknight news presenter on Nine News Melbourne in 2024 - with Hitchener moving to the weekend bulletins.
- 20 November –
  - Three Australian television programs win their categories at the 51st International Emmy Awards in New York: Harley & Katya for Best Sports Documentary, Built to Survive for Kids: Factual, and Heartbreak High for Kids: Live Action.
  - It's announced "Fast Ed" would be departing the Seven Network's lifestyle program Better Homes and Gardens after almost twenty years, with the final edition in which he appears scheduled to air on 1 December.
- 22 November –
  - Bruce Lehrmann settles his defamation case against the Australian Broadcasting Corporation which the ABC says was "settled on mutually acceptable, confidential terms, without admission of liability". However, Lehrmann continues his defamation action against Network 10 and Lisa Wilkinson which commences in the Federal Court in Sydney.
  - The Australian Transport Safety Bureau releases its findings into the helicopter crash in February 2022, in which Outback Wrangler star Willow Wilson was killed in West Arnhem Land, concluding that fuel exhaustion was the likely cause.
- 30 November – Peter Hitchener reads his final weeknight edition of Nine News Melbourne.

=== December ===
- 4 December – The International Cricket Council announce that Amazon Prime Video had secured the exclusive broadcast rights for all ICC tournament matches, commencing in 2024. The announcement comes after federal communications minister Michelle Rowland introduces proposed new anti-siphoning laws to parliament, requiring free to air networks to be offered first refusal for major sporting events. The decision to award the rights to the ICC tournament cricket matches to a streaming service is criticised by lobby group FreeTV Australia, who call for the changes to the anti-siphoning rules laws to be fast-tracked.
- 7 December –
  - It's announced that Seven West Media CEO James Warburton will step down from the role at the end of the financial year and will be succeeded by Jeff Howard.
  - After appearing in Darwin Local Court for a brief committal hearing, the star of Outback Wrangler and Wild Croc Territory Matt Wright is committed to stand trial in the Northern Territory Supreme Court on a charge of attempting to pervert the course of justice, which is related to the fatal helicopter crash in 2022 in which his co-star Chris "Willow" Wilson was killed. Wright strenuously denies all charges.
- 12 December –
  - Network 10 confirms the 10 News First: Perth bulletin anchored by Natalie Forrest would continue to be broadcast live from its Subiaco studio in Perth in 2024.
- 15 December –
  - The Drum which aired on both ABC TV and the ABC News channel final edition is broadcast. The three main presenters Julia Baird, Ellen Fanning and Dan Bourchier will be remain with the ABC.
- 17 December – It's reported that after 17 years ABC News presenter Karina Carvalho would be leaving the Australian Broadcasting Corporation.
- 21 December – Warren Mundine receives a formal apology from SBS after its ombudsman Amy Stockwell found NITV's The Point: Australia Decides program hosted by Narelda Jacobs on the night of the 2023 Australian Indigenous Voice referendum twice breached the broadcaster's Code of Conduct. During the program which featured Mundine and Marcia Langton as panelists, Jacobs was found to have given the impression that one perspective had been unduly favoured when she criticised Mundine and described Langton as a "national treasure". Stockwell also finds the program failed to provide an opportunity for Mundine to respond to a significant claim by Langton about Mundine's business when his microphone was muted.
- 22 December – The final edition of Network 10's morning program Studio 10 goes to air.

== Radio ==
=== January ===
- 30 January –
  - The Chrissie Swan Show, hosted by Chrissie Swan launches on the Nova Network.
  - The Pick Up, hosted by Brittany Hockley and Laura Byrne launches on the KIIS Network.

=== February ===
- 9 February – Nine Entertainment is awarded the non-exclusive audio rights for all Summer and Winter Olympic Games held between 2024 and 2032, enabling Nine Radio to cover the Olympics on 2GB, 3AW, 4BC and 6PR.
- 14 February –
  - The ABC Ombudsman Fiona Cameron finds ABC News breached the ABC's editorial guidelines of accuracy and impartiality when a radio report about a public meeting in Alice Springs was broadcast on current affairs program AM on 31 January 2023, finding that it had unduly favoured one perspective above all others.
  - ABC managing director David Anderson tells a Senate Estimates hearing that the AM report on 31 January 2023 by reporter Carly Williams which claimed there were elements of white supremacy at a public meeting in Alice Springs, should not have gone to air. Anderson claims systems and processes which should have prevented the broadcast of the report had failed.

=== March ===
- 9 March – It's announced Ricki-Lee Coulter would be joining Tim Blackwell and Joel Creasey for the Ricki-Lee, Tim & Joel national drive program on the Nova network, replacing Kate Ritchie.
- 14 March – Kate Ritchie joins Ryan Fitzgerald and Michael Wipfli for the Nova 96.9 breakfast program, Fitzy and Wippa with Kate Ritchie.
- 28 March – The Australian Communications and Media Authority find the Australian Radio Network to have breached the decency provisions in the Commercial Radio Code of Practice after Kyle Sandilands made comments during a discussion about the 2020 Paralympic Games on 1 September 2021 during The Kyle and Jackie O Show on KIIS 106.5. The ACMA described Sandilands' comments as "insensitive and hurtful toward the athletes as well as being offensive to the average moderate person in the broader community." The ACMA also find ARN breached the Code of Conduct on 3 September 2021 when Sandilands threatened Australian Greens senator Jordon Steele-John for criticising Sandilands' earlier comments.

=== April ===
- 17 April - Television presenter Brooke Boney temporarily replaces Woody Whitelaw on the KIIS Network's Will & Woody program, while Whitelaw competes on I'm a Celebrity...Get Me Out of Here!.

=== May ===
- 8 May – Triple M Townsville's Steve Price announces his retirement after hosting the station's breakfast program for the past 32 years, with his final program scheduled for 25 December.

=== June ===
- 2 June – Fox FM's' Fifi, Fev & Nick breakfast team, consisting of Fifi Box, Brendan Fevola, Nick Cody and Josiah Shala break the Guinness World Record for the longest marathon for a radio music show DJ (team) after broadcasting for 27 hours.

=== July ===
- 12 July – It's announced Michael Hing and Lewis Hobba would be leaving Triple J after three years of hosting Drive together.

=== August ===
- 10 August - The Australian Communications and Media Authority find the Australian Radio Network to have breached the decency provisions in the Commercial Radio Code of Practice after comments made on 23 August 2023 by Kyle Sandilands during The Kyle and Jackie O Show on KIIS 106.5 during a discussion about monkeypox which Sandilands characterised as "the big gay disease". The ACMA concluded "the overall sentiment of the segment stereotyped gay men as irresponsible in regard to their sexual health".
- 11 August – Abby Butler and Tyrone Pynor commence as the new Drive hosts on Triple J.

=== September ===
- 4 September – It's announced Tom Elliott will succeed Neil Mitchell as the host of 3AW's Mornings program in 2024.
- 15 September – Virginia Trioli signs off from ABC Radio Melbourne's Mornings program for the final time, leaving the role to return to ABC TV for a new arts series in 2024.

=== October ===
- 14 October – The 34th Australian Commercial Radio Awards are held in Sydney. Brendan Jones and Amanda Keller from 101.7 WSFM's Jonesy & Amanda breakfast show are named Best On Air Team (Metro), Neil Mitchell is named Best Talk Presenter (Metro), while 4BC's Laurel Edwards and Triple M Townsville's Steve Price are inducted into the Hall of Fame.

=== November ===
- 3 November – Southern Cross Austereo reveals there will be only three east coast breakfast shows on its regional Hit Network in 2024, with 90.9 Sea FM's breakfast show hosted by Bonte Langbroek and Danny Lakey set to be heard across regional Queensland from the Gold Coast. The Hit 106.9 Jess & Ducko breakfast show, hosted by Jess Farchione and Nick Ducat will also be networked across New South Wales from Newcastle, while Hit 100.9's Dan & Christie breakfast show, hosted by Dan Taylor and Christie Hayes, will be broadcast across Tasmania and regional Victoria from Hobart.
- 15 November – ABC Radio Sydney's Afternoons presenter Josh Szeps announces on air that he has decided to leave the station at the end of the year, with his final program scheduled for 22 December. Szeps cited "penalties" for speaking bluntly and bemoaned the risk involved in having conversations about controversial issues for his decision to resign from the ABC.
- 17 November –
  - ABC Radio Adelaide Breakfast presenter Stacey Lee resigns from the ABC to be the new Afternoons host on FIVEaa in 2024.
  - It's announced Julian Schiller and Sonya Feldhoff would be co-hosting ABC Radio Adelaide's Breakfast program in 2024.
- 22 November – Kyle Sandilands and Jackie O sign Australia's longest ever radio deal with the Australian Radio Network, vowing to host The Kyle and Jackie O Show for the next ten years, which will also see them broadcast live into the Melbourne market for the first time in 2024.
- 23 November –
  - Australia's first radio station, ABC Radio Sydney (originally 2SB) celebrates 100 years on air. To commemorate the anniversary, the station ceases its use of the time signal "pips".
  - Tom Switzer announces he is resigning from the ABC after nine years of hosting Radio National's Between the Lines program.
- 29 November – Craig Reucassel is announced as the new host of ABC Radio Sydney's Breakfast program in 2024, while it's also announced James Valentine is returning to the station's Afternoons program.
- 30 November – Peter Goers signs off for the last time from ABC Radio Adelaide's Evenings program, after having hosted the show since 2003.

=== December ===
- 1 December –
  - Neil Mitchell signs off for the last time from the morning program on Melbourne's 3AW after having hosted the show since 1990.
  - The local Jase & Lauren breakfast show airs for the final time on Melbourne's KIIS 101.1 ahead of the station taking The Kyle and Jackie O Show in 2024, networked from Sydney's KIIS 106.5.
  - Triple M Gold Coast is officially renamed 92.5 Triple M Gold.
- 5 December – ABC Radio National celebrates the 100th anniversary of the first test broadcasts of its original station 2FC.
- 7 December – Former 2GB Breakfast host Alan Jones is accused of indecently assaulting four young men during his time at the station, with the allegations published in The Sydney Morning Herald by investigative journalist Kate McClymont. Jones' lawyers respond to the allegations by describing them as "demonstrably false" and indicate they had commenced defamation proceedings against McClymont and Nine Newspapers.
- 11 December – It's announced that Richard Kingsmill would be leaving the Australian Broadcasting Corporation after 35 years, after first joining the ABC's youth network Triple J as a producer in 1988, ultimately becoming group music director in 2017 overseeing music content for Triple J and ABC Local Radio as well as Triple J Unearthed, Double J and ABC Country.
- 13 December – ABC Ombudsman Fiona Cameron finds the 24 November 2023 edition of Triple J's Hip Hop Show breached the ABC's standards for due impartiality and for the responsible management of controversial program material after guest presenter Miss Kaninna delivered pro-Palestine comments during the show, prompting complaints.
- 20 December – Journalist Antoinette Lattouf who is filling in for Sarah Macdonald on ABC Radio Sydney's Mornings program is sacked by the Australian Broadcasting Corporation after posting about the Gaza war on social media. Lattouf responds by saying she believes she was terminated unlawfully and that it was "not a win for journalism or critical, fair thinking."
- 25 December – Long serving Townsville radio presenter and ACRA Hall of Fame inductee Steve Price hosts his final radio program on Triple M Townsville, formerly known as 4TO FM.

== Sport ==
=== January ===
- 5 January – The world's first statue of a female cricketer is erected at the Sydney Cricket Ground with a bronze sculpture of Belinda Clark officially unveiled.
- 7 January – A professional drag racing competitor is killed at the New Year Nitro event at the Willowbank Raceway in Ipswich, Queensland when his car crashes into a camera tower.
- 8 January –
  - The third cricket test between Australia and South Africa at the Sydney Cricket Ground ends in a draw, but Australia win the series 2–0.
  - Novak Djokovic wins the Men's singles final at the 2023 Adelaide International 1 tournament while Aryna Sabalenka wins the Women's singles final.
  - The United States win the inaugural United Cup tennis competition which concludes at Ken Rosewall Arena in Sydney.
- 10 January – Football Australia rules that Melbourne Victory FC brought the game into disrepute, penalising the club with a $550,000 fine and a suspended 10-point deduction for the violent A-League pitch invasion which occurred at AAMI Park on 17 December 2022 which saw fans run onto the field and assault referee Alex King and player Tom Glover.
- 12 January – Cricket Australia announces that they are withdrawing the Australian team from a three-match One Day International series that they were due to play against Afghanistan in the United Arab Emirates due to the treatment of women by the Taliban.
- 14 January – Kwon Soon-woo becomes the Men's singles champion at the 2023 Adelaide International 2 tournament while Belinda Bencic wins the Women's singles title.
- 17 January –
  - Grace Brown wins the Women's Tour Down Under.
  - Play is suspended on all outside courts at the Australian Open just after 2 pm AEDST when Tennis Australia's extreme heat policy is enacted due to high temperatures. Play resumes at 5 pm AEDST but is again interrupted due to rain.
- 18 January – Daisy Pearce announces her retirement from Women's Australian rules football.
- 28 January – Aryna Sabalenka becomes Australian Open women's singles champion.
- 30 January – Novak Djokovic becomes Australian Open men's singles champion for the tenth time.

=== February ===
- 4 February – The Perth Scorchers win the 2022–23 Big Bash League season defeating the Brisbane Heat in the final at Perth Stadium.
- 7 February –
  - Aaron Finch announces his retirement from international cricket.
  - 12-year-old Chloe Covell wins silver at the 2023 World Skateboarding Championships in Sharjah.
- 11 February – Professional road racing cyclist Rohan Dennis announces his plans to retire at the end of the 2023 season.
- 18 February – The World Club Challenge takes place with the Penrith Panthers losing by one point.
- 22 February – The Matildas claim victory in the 2023 Cup of Nations with a 3–0 victory over Jamaica in the final match in Newcastle.
- 26 February – Australia wins the 2023 ICC Women's T20 World Cup, defeating South Africa by 19 runs.

=== March ===
- 2 March – The 2023 NRL season commences, with Melbourne Storm defeating Parramatta Eels 16–12 at CommBank Stadium.
- 5 March – The Dolphins play their inaugural NRL match, defeating Sydney Roosters 28–18.
- 24 March – A power outage occurs at The Gabba during the Friday night AFL game between the Brisbane Lions and the Melbourne Demons with 12 minutes remaining in the fourth quarter, stopping play for 38 minutes.

=== April ===
- 2 April – Max Verstappen wins the 2023 Australian Grand Prix.

=== May ===
- 2 May – The Australian Football League (AFL) give its 19th AFL license to Tasmania after decades of campaigning.
- 31 May – Queensland defeat New South Wales 26–18 in the first match of the 2023 State of Origin series, held at Adelaide Oval. Queensland prop Reuben Cotter is named player of the match.

=== June ===
- 1 June – Queensland defeat New South Wales 18–10 in the first match of the 2023 Women's State of Origin series, held at CommBank Stadium. Queensland prop Keilee Joseph is awarded the Nellie Doherty Medal for player of the match.
- 20 June – Australia win the first Ashes test beating England by two wickets at Edgbaston Cricket Ground, securing a 1–0 lead in the five test series.
- 21 June – Queensland defeat New South Wales 32–6 in the second match of the 2023 State of Origin series, held at Suncorp Stadium, sealing a series victory. Queensland prop Lindsay Collins is named player of the match.
- 22 June – New South Wales defeat Queensland 18–14 in the second match of the 2023 Women's State of Origin series, held at Queensland Country Bank Stadium, though Queensland win the series overall based on points difference. Queensland second rower Tazmin Gray is named player of the match and is awarded the Nellie Doherty medal for player of the series.
- 27 June – Sam Mitchell, Jimmy Bartel, Corey Enright, Michael Aish, Tom Leahy, Mark Williams and Bruce McAvaney are all inducted into the Australian Football Hall of Fame. Barry Cable is removed from the Hall of Fame after being found to have repeatedly sexually abused a Perth girl during his playing career.

=== July ===
- 2 July –
  - Boxer Jeff Horn announces his retirement.
  - Australia wins the second Ashes test, beating England by 43 runs at Lord's, taking a 2–0 nil lead in the five-match series. However, a controversial stumping of Jonny Bairstow by Alex Carey prompts some members of the Marylebone Cricket Club to allegedly verbally abuse and physically contact the Australian players as they return to their dressing rooms at lunch, while accusing the players of cheating. This prompts reactions from Usman Khawaja and David Warner before stewards usher them away. Three MCC members are suspended as a result.
- 4 July – The Australian Sports Brain Bank publish findings which reveal Heather Anderson, a former AFLW player who died at the age of 28 in 2022, is the first female athlete to be diagnosed with the degenerative brain disease chronic traumatic encephalopathy, which is caused by repetitive head injuries.
- 5 July – An ongoing pay dispute with the National Rugby League escalates when the Rugby League Players Association announces it has instructed NRL and NRLW players not to partake in any media interviews during Round 19 or the third State of Origin after a breakdown in protracted negotiations over the collective bargaining agreement. NRL CEO Andrew Abdo describes the action taken as disappointing.
- 8 July – Alexander Volkanovski wins the UFC 290 bout against Yair Rodríguez at T-Mobile Arena in Paradise, Nevada.
- 9 July – England win the third Ashes test, beating Australia by three wickets at Headingley Cricket Ground and with the series now 2–1 keep themselves in contention in the five-test series.
- 10 July – The Gold Coast Suns sack senior coach Stuart Dew.
- 12 July – New South Wales win the final State of Origin game but the 24–10 victory over Queensland isn't enough to win the series with Queensland winning the series 2–1. Cody Walker is named Player of the Match.
- 14 July –
  - Australian swimmers begin competing at the 2023 World Aquatics Championships in Fukuoka.
  - More than 50,000 spectators at Docklands Stadium watch a friendly women's soccer game between the Matildas and France, with the Matildas winning the match 1–0 after a Mary Fowler goal.
- 20 July – The 2023 FIFA Women's World Cup commences which is jointly hosted by Australia and New Zealand. The Matildas win their opening match against the Republic of Ireland 1–0 despite captain Sam Kerr being unable to play due to a calf injury.
- 22 July – The 2023 NRL Women's season gets underway with the first of Round 1 between the Gold Coast Titans and the North Queensland Cowboys at Robina Stadium.
- 23 July –
  - Ariarne Titmus breaks the 400-metre women's freestyle world record at the 2023 World Aquatics Championships in Fukuoka.
  - Australia retains The Ashes after rain washes out the last day of play of the fourth Ashes test at Old Trafford which ends in a draw. Australia takes a 2–1 lead before the final test at The Oval.
- 26 July – Mollie O'Callaghan breaks the 200-metre women's freestyle world record at the 2023 World Aquatics Championships in Fukuoka.
- 27 July – Australia breaks the 4 x 200-metre women's freestyle relay world record at the 2023 World Aquatics Championships in Fukuoka.
- 29 July –
  - Australia breaks the 4 x 100-metre mixed freestyle relay world record at the 2023 World Aquatics Championships in Fukuoka.
  - Geelong Cats footballer Jeremy Cameron is allegedly assaulted when he was headbutted in an unprovoked attack while watching the cricket at a pub in South Geelong.
- 31 July –
  - Australian rules footballer Buddy Franklin announces his retirement.
  - The Matildas win their match against Canada at the 2023 FIFA Women's World Cup to advance to the knockout stage.
  - England win the fifth Ashes test bowling Australia out and winning by 49 runs to draw the series 2–2, but with Australia retaining the urn.

=== August ===
- 1 August – Australian runner Peter Bol is cleared of doping following a Sport Integrity Australia investigation. The World Anti-Doping Agency says it will review its testing processes after notifying Bol of a positive test result for synthetic EPO in January despite subsequent analysis of a B-sample returning an "atypical" finding.
- 5 August – The Wallabies narrowly lose the final Bledisloe Cup match of 2023 to the All Blacks in Dunedin, 23–20.
- 6 August – The Diamonds win the 2023 Netball World Cup, beating England 61–45 in Cape Town in what was Ash Brazill's final game.
- 7 August – The Matildas progress through to the quarter-finals of the 2023 FIFA Women's World Cup after defeating Denmark 2–0 at Brisbane Stadium with Caitlin Foord and Hayley Raso scoring a goal each.
- 12 August – The Matildas progress through to the semi-finals of the 2023 FIFA Women's World Cup after defeating France in a penalty shootout at Brisbane Stadium, with Cortnee Vine kicking the winning penalty.
- 13 August – Ed Goddard and Niamh Allen are the respective men's and women's winners of Sydney's 14 km City2Surf.
- 16 August – The England Lionesses beat the Matildas 3–1 in a semi-final of the 2023 FIFA Women's World Cup at Stadium Australia.
- 19 August –
  - A goal umpire denies the Adelaide Crows a match-winning goal kicked by Ben Keays in the final 90 seconds of their Round 23 match against the Sydney Swans at Adelaide Oval, mistakenly believing the ball had hit the post, which results in the Crows missing out a place in the finals. The goal umpire is subsequently stood down and the AFL's CEO Gillon McLachlan apologises for the mistake.
  - Jack Ziebell plays his final game for the North Melbourne Football Club.
- 20 August –
  - Just hours after playing his final game, footballer Jack Ziebell is allegedly assaulted in an unprovoked at a bar in South Yarra at approximately 1 am while celebrating his retirement. Two men were subsequently arrested for the alleged assault.
  - The 2023 FIFA Women's World Cup final is played at Stadium Australia in Sydney, where Spain defeats England 1–0.
  - The Matildas are presented with the keys to the city at a public reception held at Brisbane's Riverstage where premier Annastacia Palaszczuk promised to triple investment into improving women's facilities at local sports clubs. Australian singer Nikki Webster also surprises the team with a performance of "Strawberry Kisses".
- 23 August – Nina Kennedy wins gold in the women's pole vault event at the 2023 World Athletics Championships in Budapest, sharing it with American Katie Moon.
- 25 August – Collingwood claims the AFL's minor premiership for the first time since 2011 after defeating Essendon by 70 points at the MCG.
- 27 August – Matt Smith and Sinead Noonan are the respective men's and women's winners of Perth's 12 km City to Surf.

=== September ===
- 1 September – The 2023 AFL Women's season gets underway with the first game of Round 1 between Melbourne and Collingwood at Princes Park.
- 2 September – The Penrith Panthers win the NRL minor premiership and are awarded the J. J. Giltinan Shield for the third time in four years after defeating the North Queensland Cowboys 44–12 at Penrith Stadium. Wests Tigers finish in last position, claiming their second straight wooden spoon.
- 9 September – The Wallabies beat Georgia 35–15 in their opening match at the 2023 Rugby World Cup in France – their first win under coach Eddie Jones.
- 15 September – A stand at Stadium Australia is named the Cathy Freeman Stand in honour of Cathy Freeman, the first Aboriginal athlete to win an individual Olympic gold medal for Australia.
- 17 September – In their first win against Australia since 1954, Fiji defeats Wallabies 22–15 in a 2023 Rugby World Cup pool match.
- 24 September – Wallabies are defeated by Wales by 40–6 and are likely to be knocked out of the 2023 Rugby World Cup without progressing past the pool stages for the first time in history. Coach Eddie Jones and captain David Porecki both apologise to Australia for their team's poor performance.
- 25 September – Lachie Neale wins the 2023 Brownlow Medal.
- 27 September – Kalyn Ponga and Tamika Upton are awarded the Dally M Medals at the 2023 Dally M Awards.
- 28 September – After a four-day trial in the District Court of New South Wales, Sri Lankan cricketer Danushka Gunathilaka is found not guilty of raping a woman in Sydney after having been accused of stealthing in Sydney in November 2022, while in Australia for the 2022 ICC Men's T20 World Cup.
- 30 September – The Collingwood Magpies defeat the Brisbane Lions in the 2023 AFL Grand Final.

=== October ===
- 1 October –
  - The Penrith Panthers defeat the Brisbane Broncos in the 2023 NRL Grand Final.
  - The Newcastle Knights defeat the Gold Coast Titans in the 2023 NRLW Grand Final.
- 8 October –
  - Shane van Gisbergen wins the Bathurst 1000 for the third time.
  - Australia is defeated by six wickets in their World Cup match against India at M. A. Chidambaram Stadium.
- 12 October – Australia is defeated by 134 runs in their 2023 Cricket World Cup match against South Africa at Bharat Ratna Shri Atal Bihari Vajpayee Ekana Cricket Stadium.
- 14 October –
  - The Socceroos are defeated by England 1–0 in an international friendly at Wembley Stadium in London.
  - The Joseph Pride-trained Think About It jockeyed by Sam Clipperton wins The Everest at Randwick Racecourse.
- 15 October –
  - Tim Vincent and Eloise Wellings are the respective men's and women's winners in the 10 km Bridge to Brisbane.
  - Reece Edwards and Gemma Maini are the respective men's and women's winners in the 42 km Melbourne Marathon.
  - Ali Day and Lana Rogers are the respective men's and women's winners of the Coolangatta Gold.
- 16 October – Australia wins by five wickets in their 2023 Cricket World Cup match against Sri Lanka at BRSABV Ekana Cricket Stadium.
- 19 October – The 2023–24 Women's Big Bash League season commences at with a match between the Sydney Sixers and the Melbourne Stars at North Sydney Oval.
- 20 October –
  - The 2023–24 A-League Men season begins with Adelaide United defeating reigning champions Central Coast Mariners 3–0.
  - Australia wins by 62 runs in their 2023 Cricket World Cup match against Pakistan at M. Chinnaswamy Stadium.
- 21 October –
  - The Anthony and Sam Freedman-trained Without A Fight, ridden by Mark Zahra, wins the Caulfield Cup at Caulfield Racecourse.
  - Australian cricketer Alyssa Healy is taken to hospital and undergoes surgery on her hand after sustaining a dog bite at home forcing her to be ruled out of the entire WBBL season.
- 23 October – The Australian Diamonds win the 2023 Constellation Cup.
- 25 October – Australia wins by 309 runs in their 2023 Cricket World Cup match against the Netherlands at Arun Jaitley Stadium during which Glenn Maxwell breaks the record for the fastest century.
- 28 October –
  - The Danny Shum-trained Romantic Warrior, ridden by James McDonald, wins the 2023 W. S. Cox Plate at Moonee Valley Racecourse.
  - Australia win by five runs in the 2023 World Cup cricket match against New Zealand at HPCA Stadium.
- 29 October – Wallabies coach Eddie Jones resigns ten months into a five-year contract.

=== November ===
- 4 November –
  - The Chris Waller-trained Riff Rocket, ridden by James McDonald, wins the Victoria Derby at Flemington Racecourse.
  - Australia win by 33 runs in their 2023 Cricket World Cup match against England at Narendra Modi Stadium.
- 5 November – Hayden Wilde and Ashleigh Gentle win the respective men's and women's categories at the Noosa Triathlon but the results are somewhat overshadowed when a 53-year-old competitor dies during the swimming leg.
- 7 November –
  - The Anthony and Sam Freedman-trained Without A Fight, ridden by Mark Zahra, wins the 2023 Melbourne Cup at Flemington Racecourse.
  - The Sara Ryan-trained Attractable, ridden by Regan Bayliss, wins the Big Dance at Randwick Racecourse.
  - Australia wins by three wickets in their 2023 Cricket World Cup match against Afghanistan at Wankhede Stadium.
- 9 November – Australian women's cricket captain Meg Lanning announces her retirement from international cricket.
- 10 November – A state memorial service is held at the MCG for Australian rules football great Ron Barassi.
- 11 November – Australia wins by eight wickets in their 2023 Cricket World Cup match against Bangladesh at Maharashtra Cricket Association Stadium.
- 16 November – Australia win by three wickets in their 2023 Cricket World Cup semi-final against South Africa at Eden Gardens, and progress through to the 2023 Cricket World Cup final against India at Narendra Modi Stadium.
- 19 November – Australia win the 2023 Cricket World Cup defeating India by six wickets in the 2023 Cricket World Cup final at Narendra Modi Stadium in Ahmedabad.
- 21 November – Former cricketer and television commentator Michael Slater pleads guilty in Noosa Magistrates Court to obstructing police following an altercation with police officers on 31 March 2023. Slater is fined $600 but no conviction was recorded.
- 22 November – Nikita Tszyu beats Dylan Biggs in a TKO victory at the Newcastle Entertainment Centre to claim the Australian super welterweight boxing title.
- 25 November – Courtney Bruce is awarded the Liz Ellis Diamond at the Australian Netball Awards, which is overshadowed when Netball Australia confirms it threatened legal action against players who planned to boycott the event amid an ongoing pay dispute. This prompts a rebuke from Liz Ellis who accuses Netball Australia of treating players with "callous disregard".
- 26 November –
  - Min Woo Lee wins the Australian PGA Championship at Royal Queensland Golf Club.
  - Australia is defeated 2–0 in the 2023 Davis Cup Final by Italy at Jose Maria Martin Carpena Arena.

=== December ===
- 1 December – The Matildas win The Don Award at the Sport Australia Hall of Fame Awards - only the third team to receive the award instead of an individual sportsperson. There are also seven new inductees into the Hall of Fame - Kim Brennan, Tim Cahill, Kurt Fearnley, Lydia Lassila, Timothy McLaren, Nova Peris and Johnathan Thurston. Three previous inductees were elevated to "Legend" status - Bob Skilton, Layne Beachley and Mark Ella.
- 2 December – The Adelaide Strikers beat the Brisbane Heat by three runs in the WBBL Final at the Adelaide Oval.
- 3 December – The Brisbane Lions win the 2023 AFL Women's Grand Final at Princes Park, defeating North Melbourne 7.2 (44) - 4.3 (27).
- 4 December – Olympic rower Simon Burgess appears in Hobart Magistrates Court charged with one count of common assault, one count of injure property and three counts of breach Family Violence Order following an alleged incident in Franklin on 2 December 2023. Magistrate Andrew McKee remanded Burgess in custody after refusing a bail application.
- 7 December – The 2023–24 Big Bash League season commences at The Gabba with a match between the Brisbane Heat and the Melbourne Stars.
- 9 December – Alyssa Healy is officially named as captain of the Australian women's cricket team across all three formats, with Tahlia McGrath named vice-captain.
- 13 December – It's revealed former Australian rules footballer and commentator Rex Hunt has been diagnosed with dementia.
- 14 December – The first cricket test between Australia and Pakistan gets underway at Perth Stadium.
- 17 December – Australia defeat Pakistan by 360 runs in a match which saw Nathan Lyon secure his 500th test wicket.
- 21 December – Australian cricketer Usman Khawaja is charged by the International Cricket Council for breaching clothing and equipment regulations during the first test in Perth after wearing a black armband without seeking prior approval. Khawaja says he will be contesting the reprimand and asking for consistency in how the ICC officiates. Khawaja had already been prevented from wearing boots displaying handwritten political slogans in the colours of the Palestinian flag during the first test due to the ICC's regulations prohibiting political, religious or racial messaging.
- 26 December –
  - The Boxing Day Test gets underway at the MCG with Pakistan winning the toss and electing to bowl first.
  - The 2023 Sydney to Hobart Yacht Race commences in Sydney Harbour with sailors warned to expect treacherous conditions.
- 28 December – LawConnect claims line honours in the 2023 Sydney to Hobart Yacht Race narrowly beating Andoo Comanche.
- 29 December –
  - Australia wins the Boxing Day Test defeating Pakistan by 79 runs. However, Pakistan claims their loss was caused by inconsistent umpiring.
  - The 2024 United Cup tennis tournament commences in Perth.
- 30 December – Alive claims overall honours in the 2023 Sydney to Hobart Yacht Race.
- 31 December –
  - The 2024 Brisbane International tennis tournament commences. Play is temporarily halted during a qualifying match between Dominic Thiem and James McCabe the day prior while an eastern brown snake is removed from the court.
  - Former professional road racing cyclist Rohan Dennis is arrested and charged causing death by dangerous driving, driving without due care and endangering life after his wife, fellow former professional cyclist Melissa Hoskins, is allegedly struck by a ute in the Adelaide suburb of Medindie. Dennis is bailed to appear in the Adelaide Magistrates Court in March 2024.

== Deaths ==
=== January ===
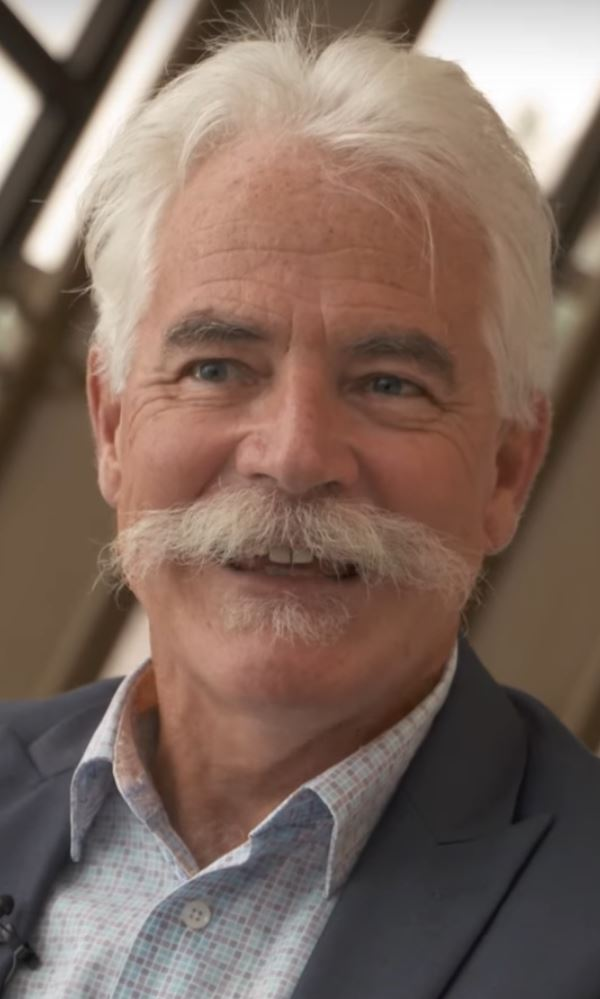
Alan Mackay-Sim

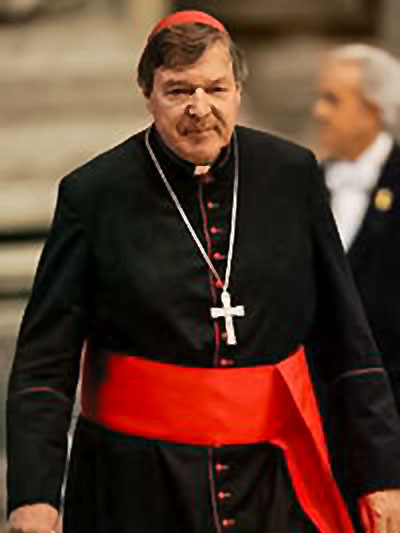
George Pell

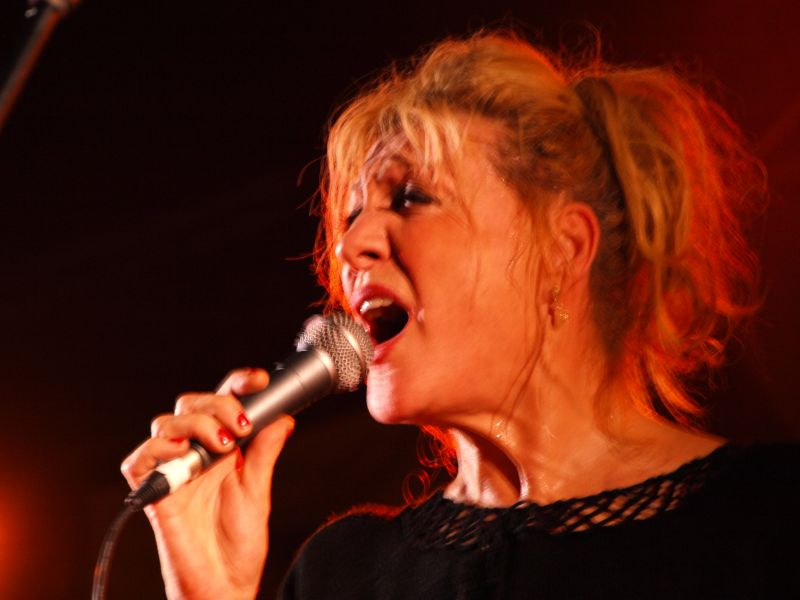
Renée Geyer

- 4 January – Alan Mackay-Sim, biomedical scientist (b. 1951)
- 6 January – David Penington, doctor and academic (b. 1930)
- 7 January – Rob Heming, rugby union player (b. 1932)
- 8 January – Slim Newton, country singer (b. 1932)
- 10 January – George Pell, Catholic cardinal (b. 1941) (died in Italy)
- 16 January – Jim Molan, New South Wales politician and military general (b. 1950)
- 17 January – Renée Geyer, singer (b. 1953)
- 21 January –
  - Simon Dunn, bobsledder (b. 1987)
  - Gabrielle Williams, author of young adult fiction (b. 1963)
- 22 January –
  - David Hains, businessman and horse breeder (b. 1931)
  - Vaughan Johnson, Queensland politician (b. 1947)
- 25 January – Duncan Pugh, bobsledder (born in the United Kingdom) (b. 1974)
- 26 January – Diana Fisher, media identity (b. 1931)
- 28 January – Phil Coles, Olympic canoeist (b. 1931)
- 29 January – John Devine, football player and coach (Geelong, North Hobart) (b. 1940)
- 30 January –
  - Andrew Grimwade, businessman and philanthropist (b. 1930)
  - Ann Harding, economist (b. 1958)

=== February ===
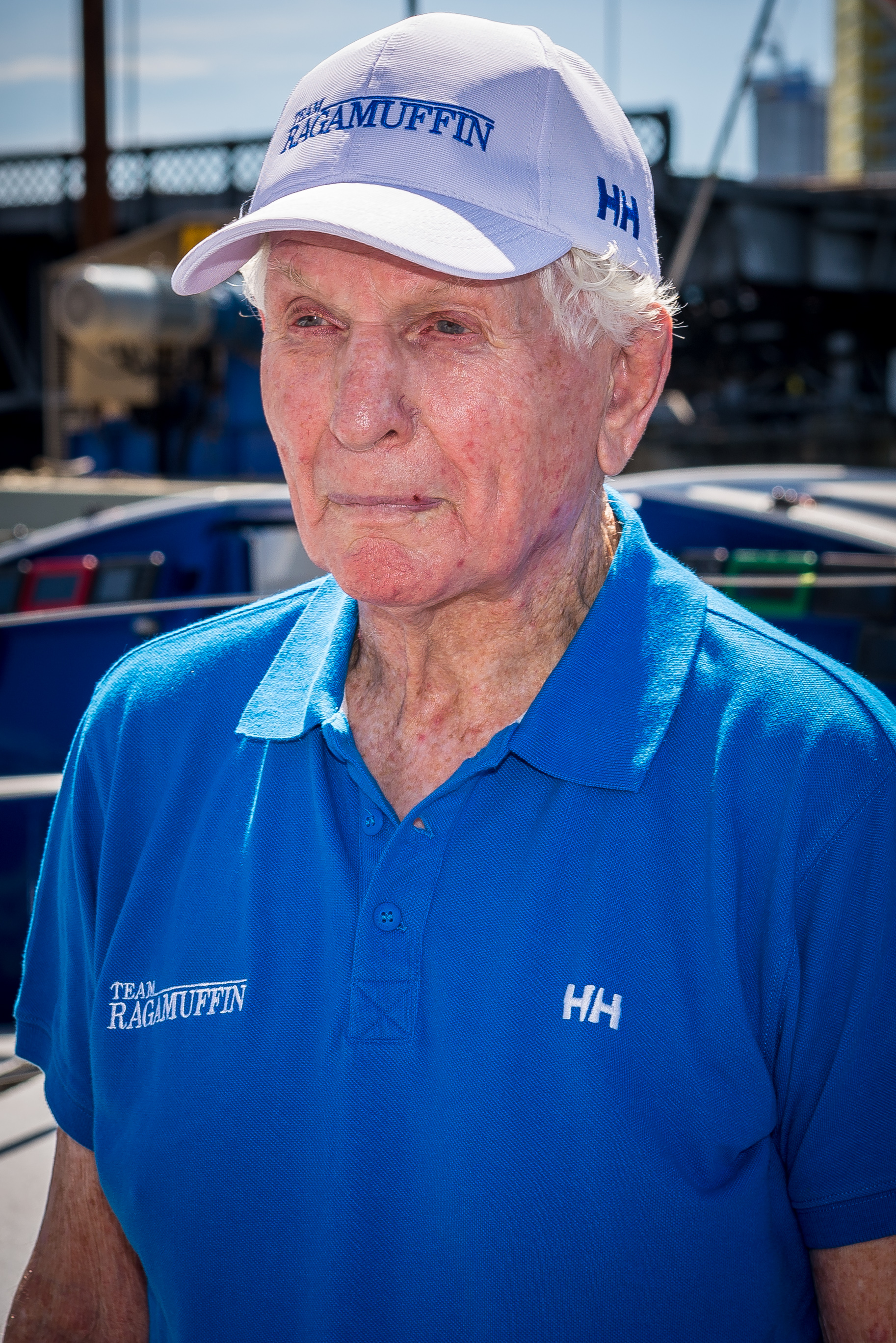
Syd Fischer

- 2 February – Richard Woolcott, diplomat (b. 1927)
- 3 February – Portia Robinson, historian (b. 1926)
- 5 February – Geoff Heskett, Olympic basketball player (1956) (b. 1929)
- 9 February – Wesley Stacey, photographer (b. 1941)
- 17 February –
  - George T. Miller, film director (b. 1943, Scotland)
  - Peter Muller, architect (b. 1927)
- 20 February – Ken Warby, motorboat racer and holder of water speed record (b. 1939) (died in the United States)
- 22 February – Jeff Watson, journalist and documentary maker (b. 1942)
- 23 February – Syd Fischer, property developer and sailor (b. 1927)

=== March ===
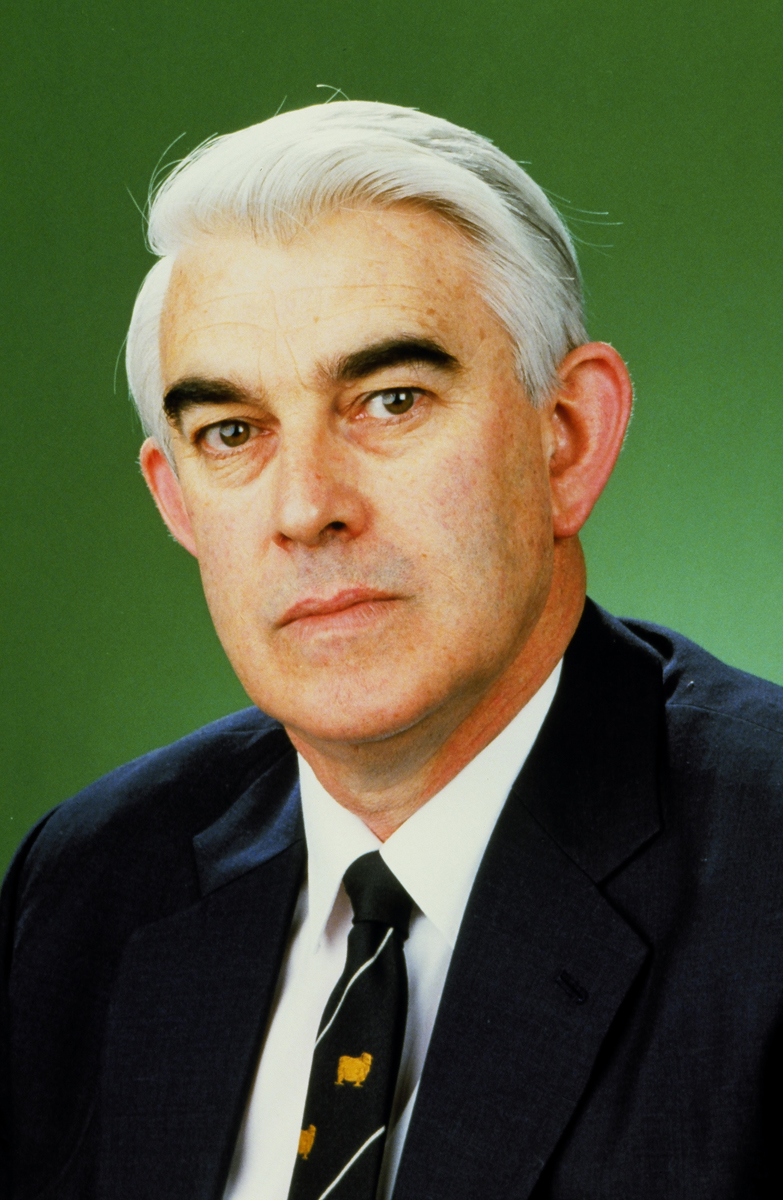
John Kerin

- 1 March – Warren Saunders, cricketer (b. 1934)
- 16 March –
  - Stephen Bromhead, New South Wales politician (b. 1957)
  - Ron Elstob, politician (b. 1924)
  - Peter Hardy, actor (b. 1957)
  - Brian Walsh, television executive (b. c. 1954)
- 17 March – James Goldrick, naval historian and officer (b. 1958)
- 20 March –
  - Bob Johnston, economist and governor of the Reserve Bank (b. 1924)
  - Terry Norris, actor and politician (b. 1930)
  - John Sattler, rugby league player (b. 1942)
- 21 March – Hugh Hiscutt, Tasmanian politician (b. 1926)
- 29 March –
  - John Kerin, politician and economist (b. 1937)
  - Stewart West, politician (b. 1934)
- 30 March – Doug Mulray, radio and television personality (b. 1951)

=== April ===
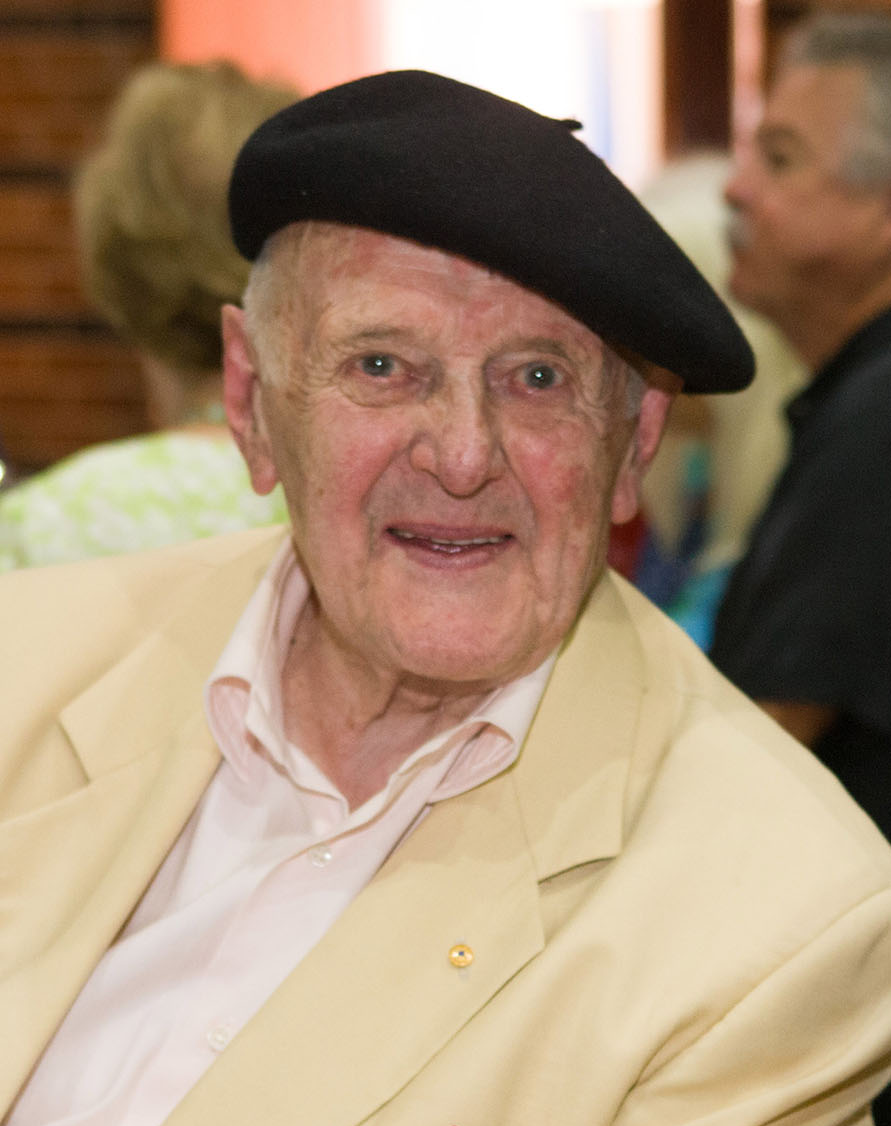
John Olsen

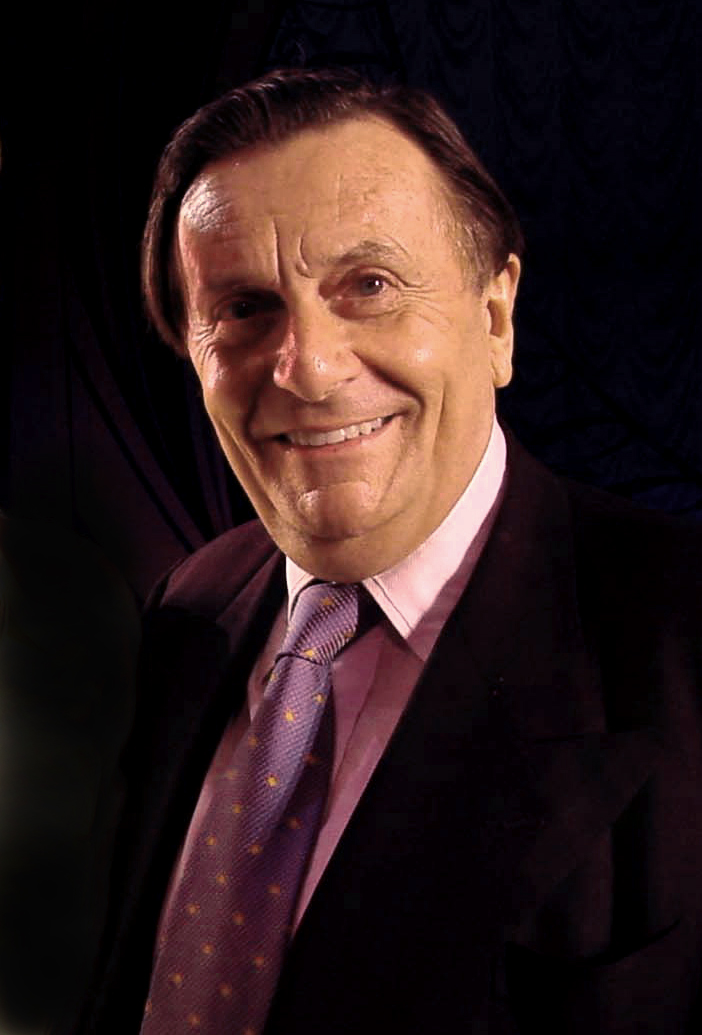
Barry Humphries

- 1 April – Fay Miller, Northern Territory politician (b. 1947)
- 3 April – Galarrwuy Yunupingu, Aboriginal leader (b. 1948)
- 6 April – Bruce Petty, political satirist (b. 1929)
- 7 April – Bruce Haigh, political commentator (b. 1945)
- 9 April – Max Hazelton, co-founder of Hazelton Airlines (b. 1927)
- 11 April – John Olsen, artist (b. 1928)
- 15 April – Faith Thomas, cricketer (b. 1933)
- 17 April – Maxine Klibingaitis, actress (b. 1964)
- 19 April –
  - Lee Harding, photographer and science fiction writer (b. 1937)
  - Father Bob Maguire, Catholic priest and community worker (b. 1934)
- 21 April – John Tranter, poet (b. 1943)
- 22 April – Barry Humphries, comedian, author, actor and satirist (b. 1934)
- 27 April – Francis Macnab, Uniting Church minister and psychologist (b. 1931)
- 30 April –
  - Broderick Smith, musician (b. 1948)
  - Jock Zonfrillo, chef (MasterChef Australia) (b. 1976)

=== May ===
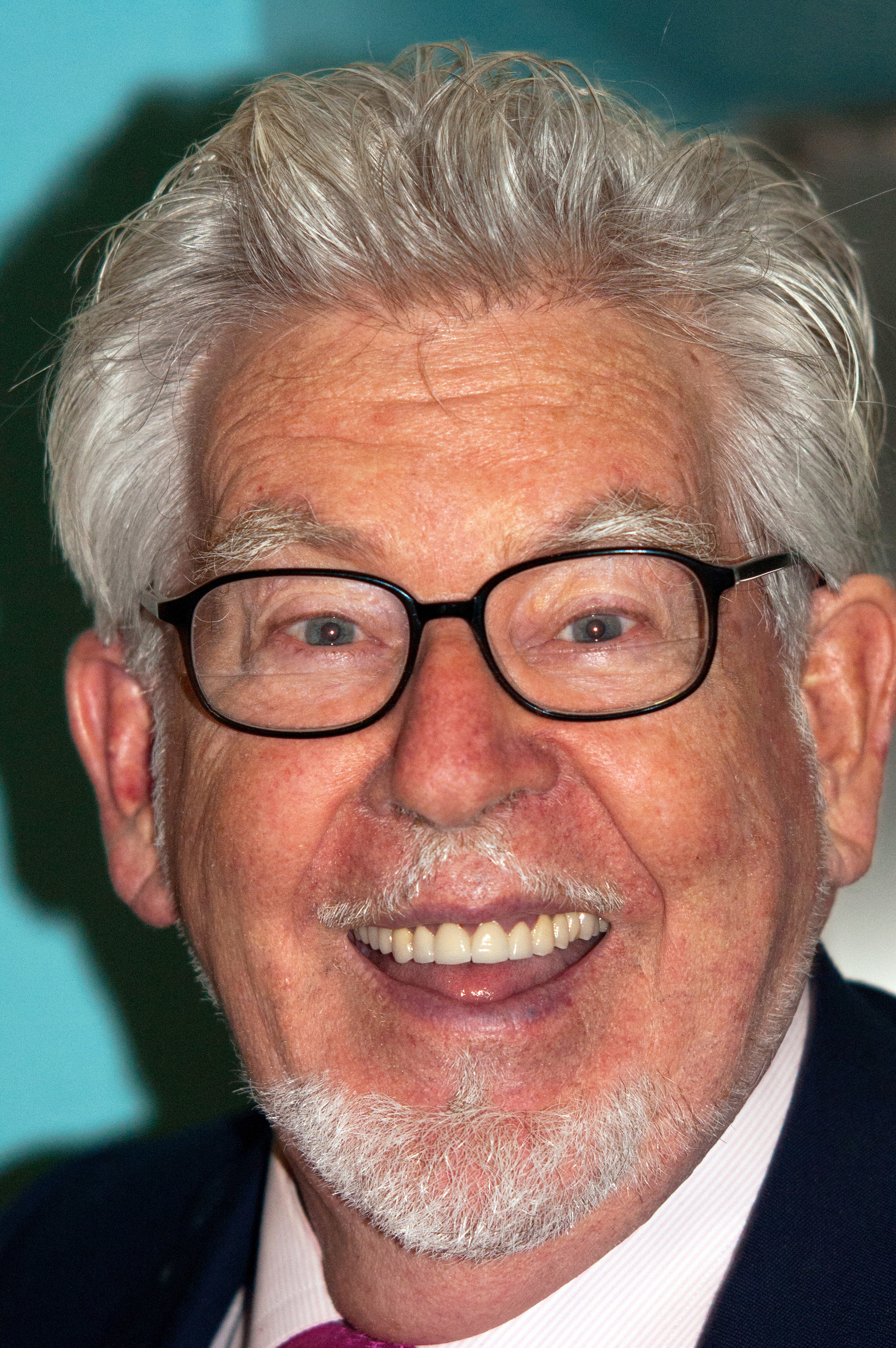
Rolf Harris

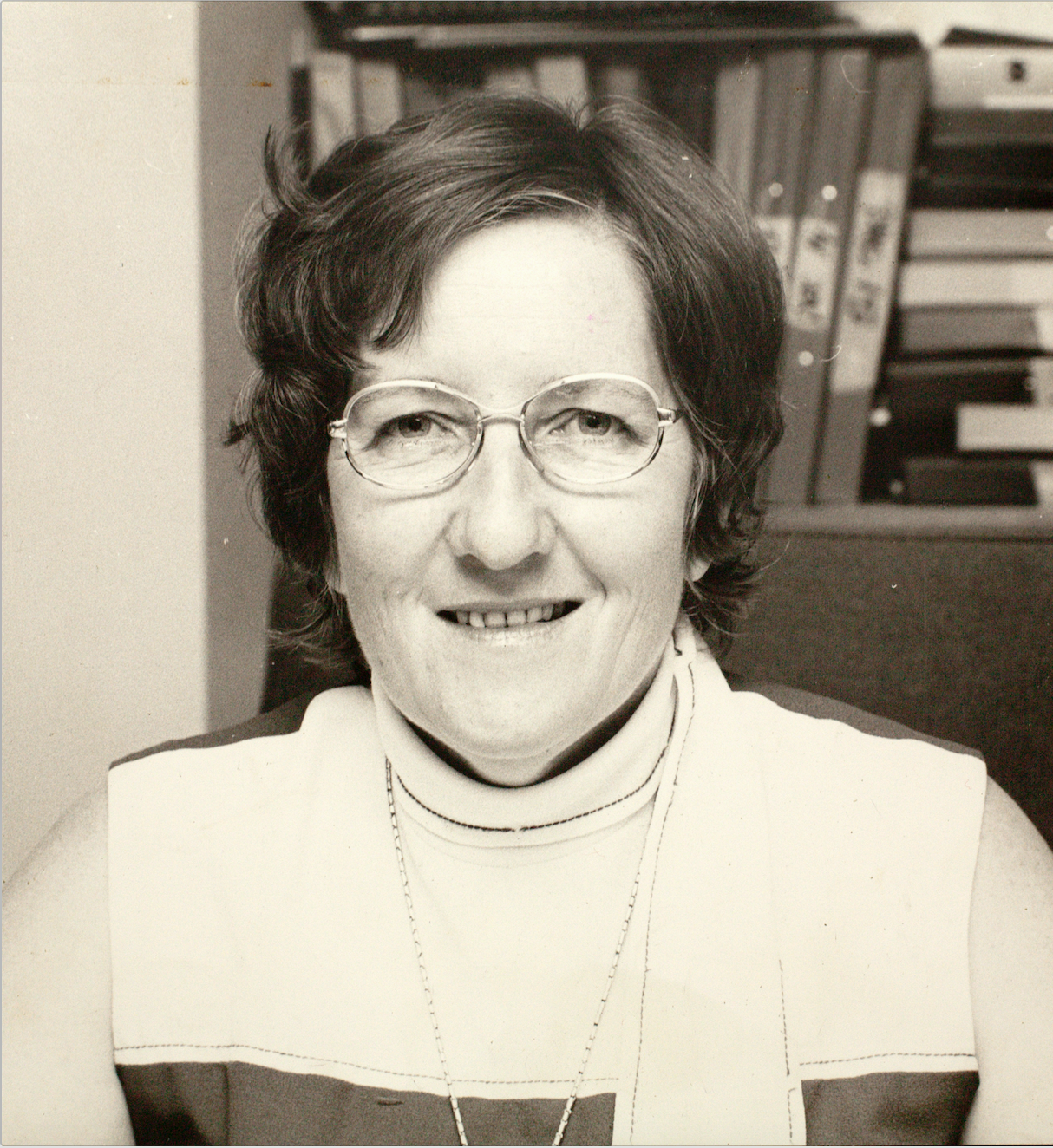
Ella Stack

- 2 May –
  - Gabrielle Carey, novelist (b. 1959)
  - Frank Phillips, golfer (b. 1932)
- 3 May – Tony Staley, politician (b. 1939)
- 4 May – Bruce Childs, politician (b. 1934)
- 5 May – Terry Lewis, police officer (b. 1928)
- 10 May –
  - Rosemary Crossley, author and disability rights advocate (b. 1945)
  - Rolf Harris, entertainer, musician and sex offender (b. 1930) (died in the United Kingdom)
- 12 May – Owen Davidson, tennis player (b. 1943)
- 13 May – Mary Parker, television presenter and actress (born in the United Kingdom) (b.1930)
- 18 May – Ray Wilkie, meteorologist (b. 1925)
- 19 May – Ella Stack, mayor of Darwin (b. 1929)
- 23 May –
  - Andrew Burke, poet (b. 1944)
  - Neil Dansie, cricketer (b. 1928)
- 25 May –
  - Joy McKean, musician (b. 1930)
  - Mac Gudgeon, screenwriter (b. 1949)
- 26 May – Andrew Evans, pastor and co-founder of the Family First Party (b. 1935)

=== June ===
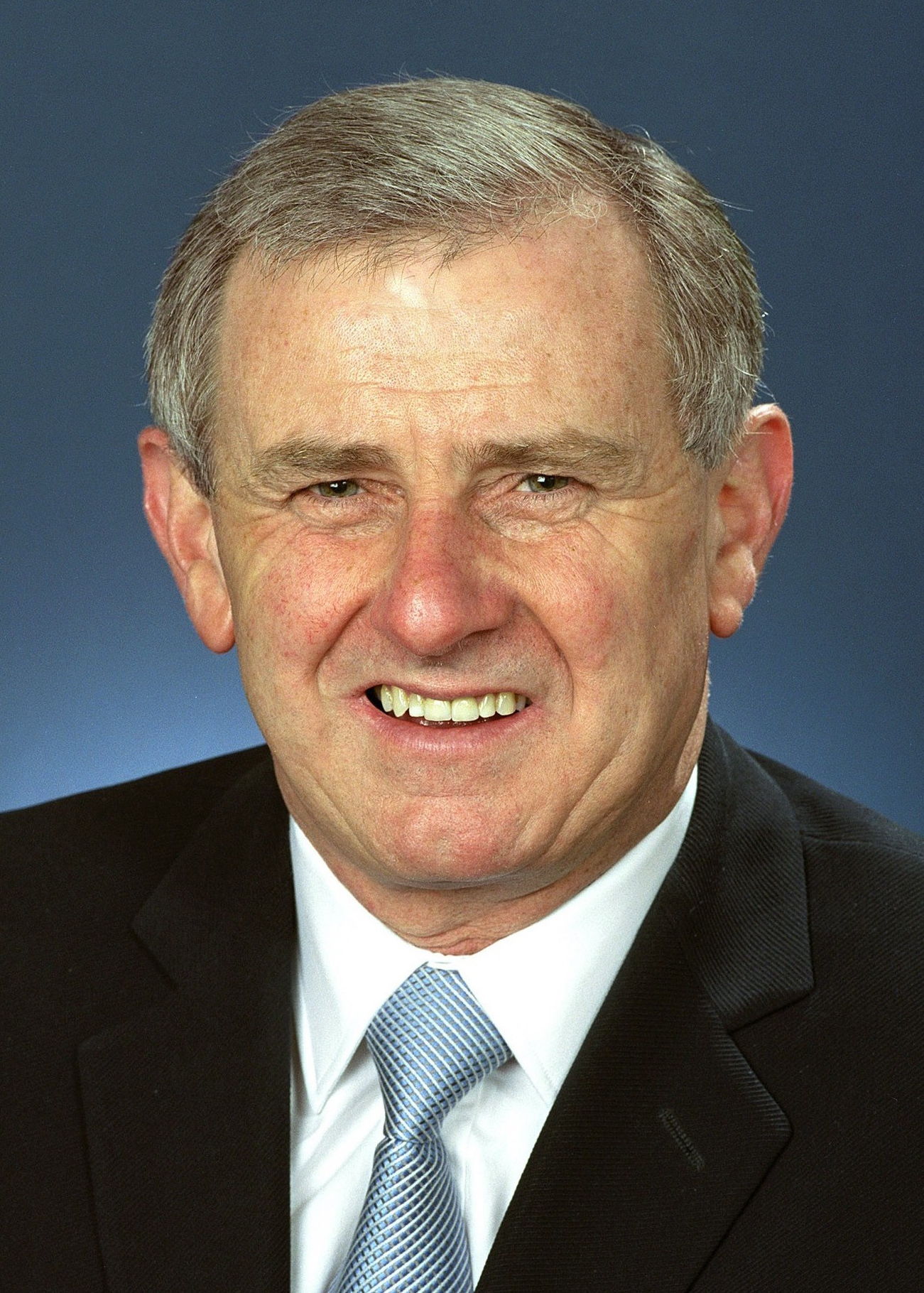
Simon Crean

- 6 June –
  - Tom Herzfeld, politician (b. 1936)
  - Jim May, chemical engineer (b. 1934)
- 8 June –
  - Rale Rasic, Australian association football player and coach (born in Bosnia) (b. 1935)
  - Craig Stewart, Australian rules footballer (b. 1956)
- 9 June – Camilla Ah Kin, actress
- 13 June – Dennis Argall, diplomat (b. 1943)
- 14 June – James Hardy, winemaker, businessman and Olympic and America's Cup yachtsman (b. 1932)
- 17 June – Siobhan O'Sullivan, political scientist (b. 1974)
- 19 June – Bernie Massey, Australian rules footballer (b. 1939)
- 20 June – Ray Wheatley, boxer (b. 1948)
- 21 June – Tom Roper, politician (b. 1945)
- 22 June – Peter Allan, cricketer (b. 1935)
- 23 June – Rocky Gattellari, boxer (born in Italy) (b. 1941)
- 25 June – Simon Crean, politician (died in Germany) (b. 1949)
- 27 June – Graeme John, Australian rules footballer (b. 1943)
- 28 June – Matt Rendell, Australian rules footballer (b. 1959)
- 29 June – Judi Farr, actress (b. 1938)
- 30 June – Ron Pretty, poet (b. 1940)

=== July ===
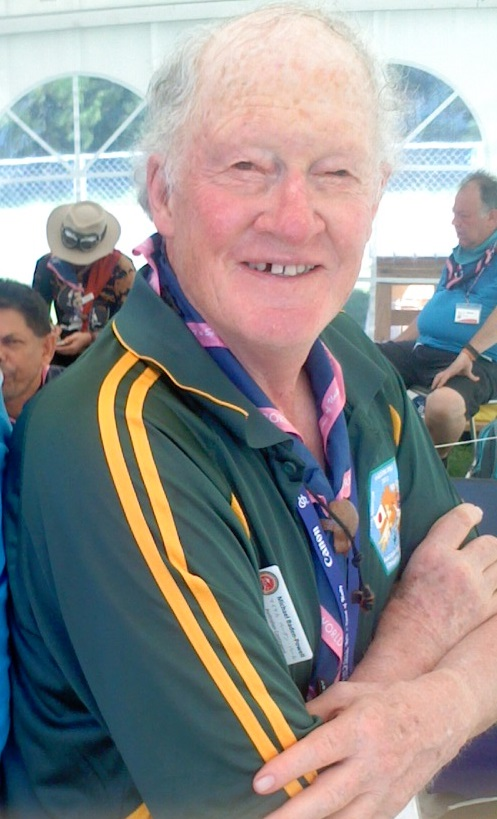
Michael Baden-Powell

- 2 July – Margaret Nisbett, soprano (b. 1929)
- 3 July – Michael Baden-Powell, scout leader (b. 1940)
- 6 July – Attila Abonyi, soccer player and manager (born in Hungary) (b. 1946)
- 10 July – Alan Wilkie, meteorologist and weather presenter
- 11 July – Dale Brede, racing driver (b. 1974)
- 13 July –
  - Ewen Jones, politician (b. 1960)
  - Alan Morrow, Australian rules footballer (b. 1936)
- 20 July – James A. Piper, physicist (b. 1947 in New Zealand)
- 21 July – Brian Taber, cricketer (b. 1940)
- 26 July – Arthur Blanch, country singer (b. 1928)
- 27 July – Gordon Dean, politician and magistrate (b. 1942)
- 28 July – Justin Yerbury, molecular biologist (b. 1974)
- 31 July – Bob Dawson, Australian rules footballer (b. 1921)

=== August ===
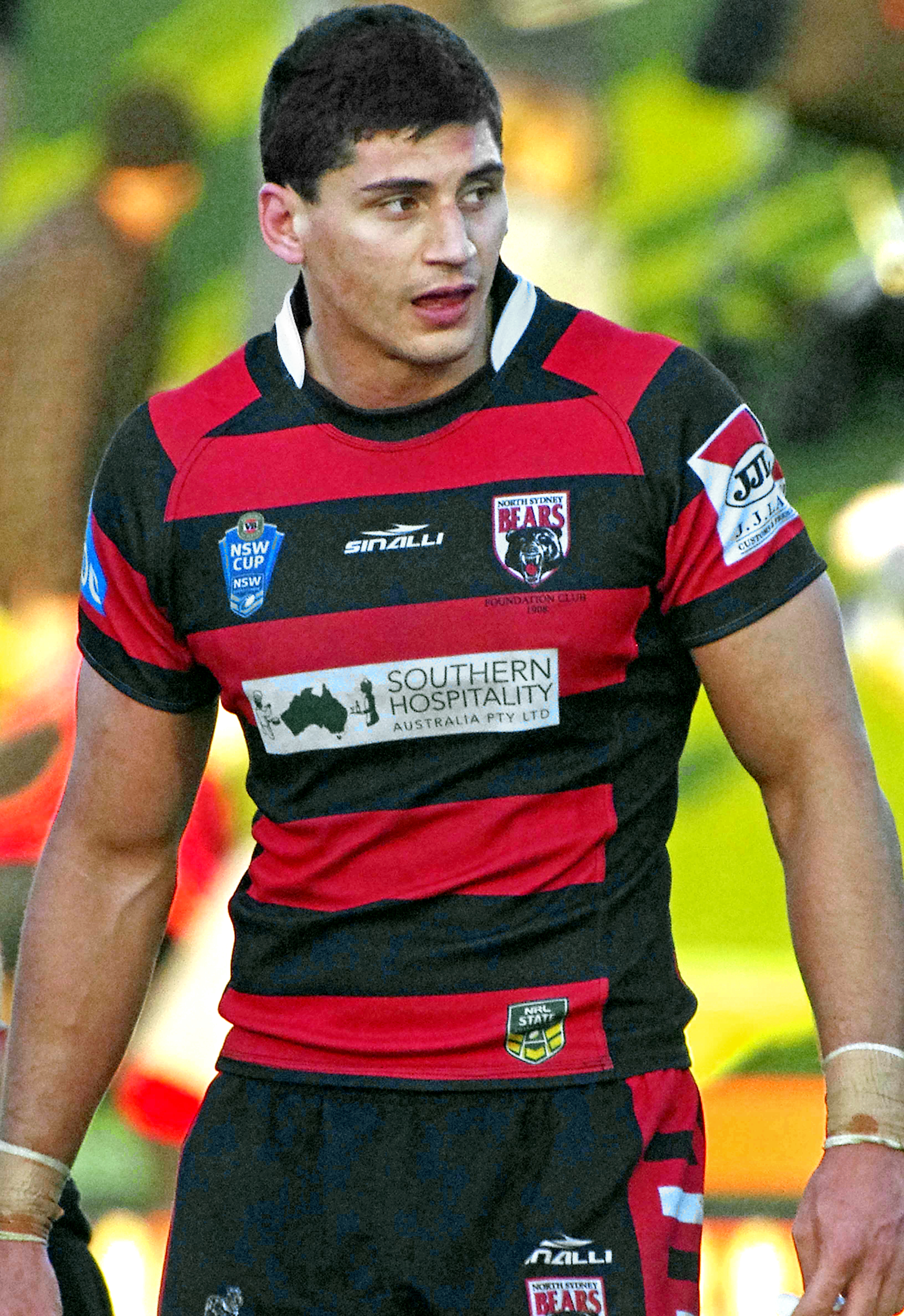
Kyle Turner

- 1 August –
  - Phillip Bennett, Governor of Tasmania (b. 1928)
  - Richard Face, politician (b. 1942)
- 6 August – Elizabeth Webby, scholar of Australian literature (born 1942)
- 11 August –
  - Mike Ahern, 32nd Premier of Queensland (b. 1942)
  - John Barrett, Australian rules footballer (b. 1928)
  - Jeff Hilton, Australian rules footballer (b. 1972)
  - Shane McNally, rugby league player (b. 1954)
  - Ron Peno, singer-songwriter (Died Pretty) (b. 1955)
- 12 August – Mary-Louise McLaws, epidemiologist (b. 1953)
- 13 August – Wolfgang Kasper, economist (b. 1939)
- 17 August – John Devitt, swimmer (b. 1937)
- 18 August – Kyle Turner, rugby league player (b. 1992)
- 20 August – Harry Smith, soldier (b. 1933)
- 25 August – Merv Cross, orthopaedic surgeon and rugby league player (b. 1941)
- 29 August – Dorothy Isaksen, politician (b. 1930)

=== September ===
- 1 September – Ken Bennett, Australian rules footballer (b. 1940)
- 12 September – Damian Evans, archaeologist
- 13 September – John McDonald, rugby league player and coach (b. 1944)
- 14 September – Rob Langer, cricketer (b. 1948)
- 16 September –
  - Ron Barassi, Australian rules footballer (b. 1936)
  - Joy Chambers, actress (b. 1946)
  - Lionel Morgan, rugby league player (b. 1938)
  - Kevin Neale, Australian rules footballer (b. 1945)
  - Paul Woseen, musician (b. 1967)
- 20 September – Graeme Page, politician (b. 1943)
- 21 September – Kevin Byrne, politician (b. 1949)
- 26 September – Geof Motley, Australian rules footballer (b. 1935)
- 29 September – Neville Harper, politician (b. 1926)

=== October ===
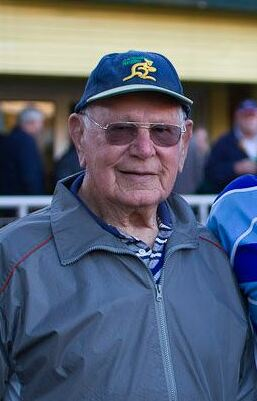
Eric Tweedale

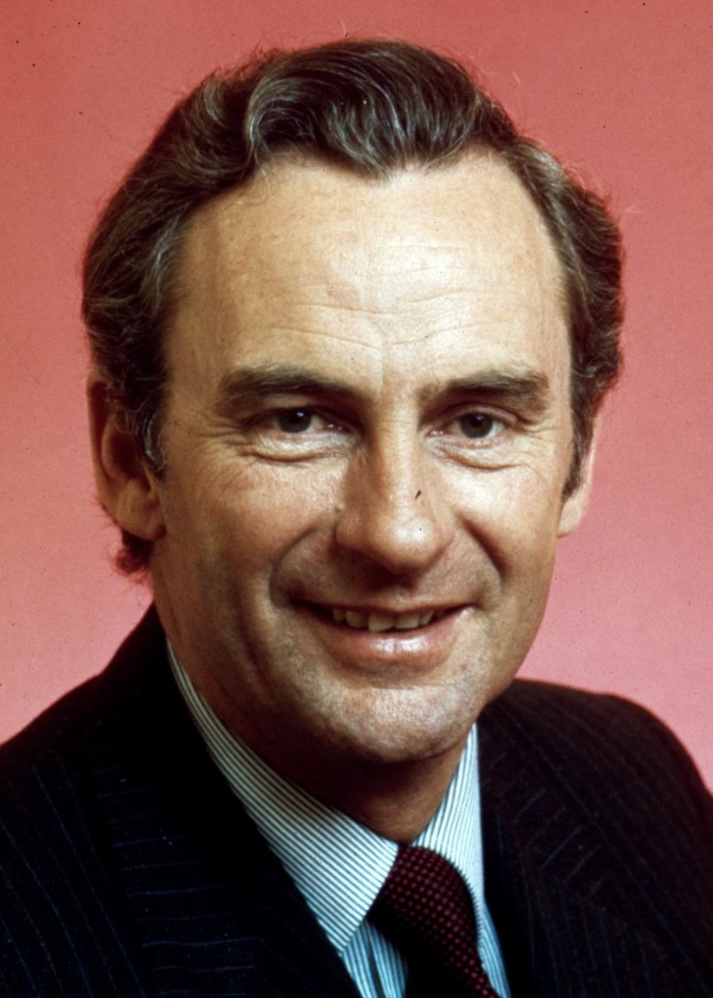
Bill Hayden

- 1 October – Charlie Horsnell, cricketer (b. 1933)
- 3 October –
  - Jacqueline Dark, opera singer (b. 1967/68)
  - Garry Nehl, politician (b. 1934)
- 4 October – Tracey Freeman, paralympic athlete (b. 1948)
- 5 October – Kevin Coombs, paralympic basketballer (b. 1941)
- 6 October – Esme Timbery, shellworker (b. 1931)
- 11 October – Cal Wilson, comedian (born in New Zealand) (b. 1970)
- 14 October – Lance Armstrong, politician and church minister (b. 1940)
- 16 October – Eric Tweedale, rugby union player (born in the United Kingdom) (b. 1921)
- 17 October – Brian Langton, NSW politician (b. 1948)
- 20 October – Leslie Dayman, actor (b. 1938)
- 21 October –
  - Max Corden, economist (b. 1927)
  - Bill Hayden, 21st Governor-General (b. 1933)
- 25 October – Lilie James, water polo coach (b. 2002)
- 26 October –
  - John Burnheim, Australian philosopher (b. 1927)
  - Helena Carr, businesswoman (born in Malaysia, died in Austria) (b. 1946)

=== November ===
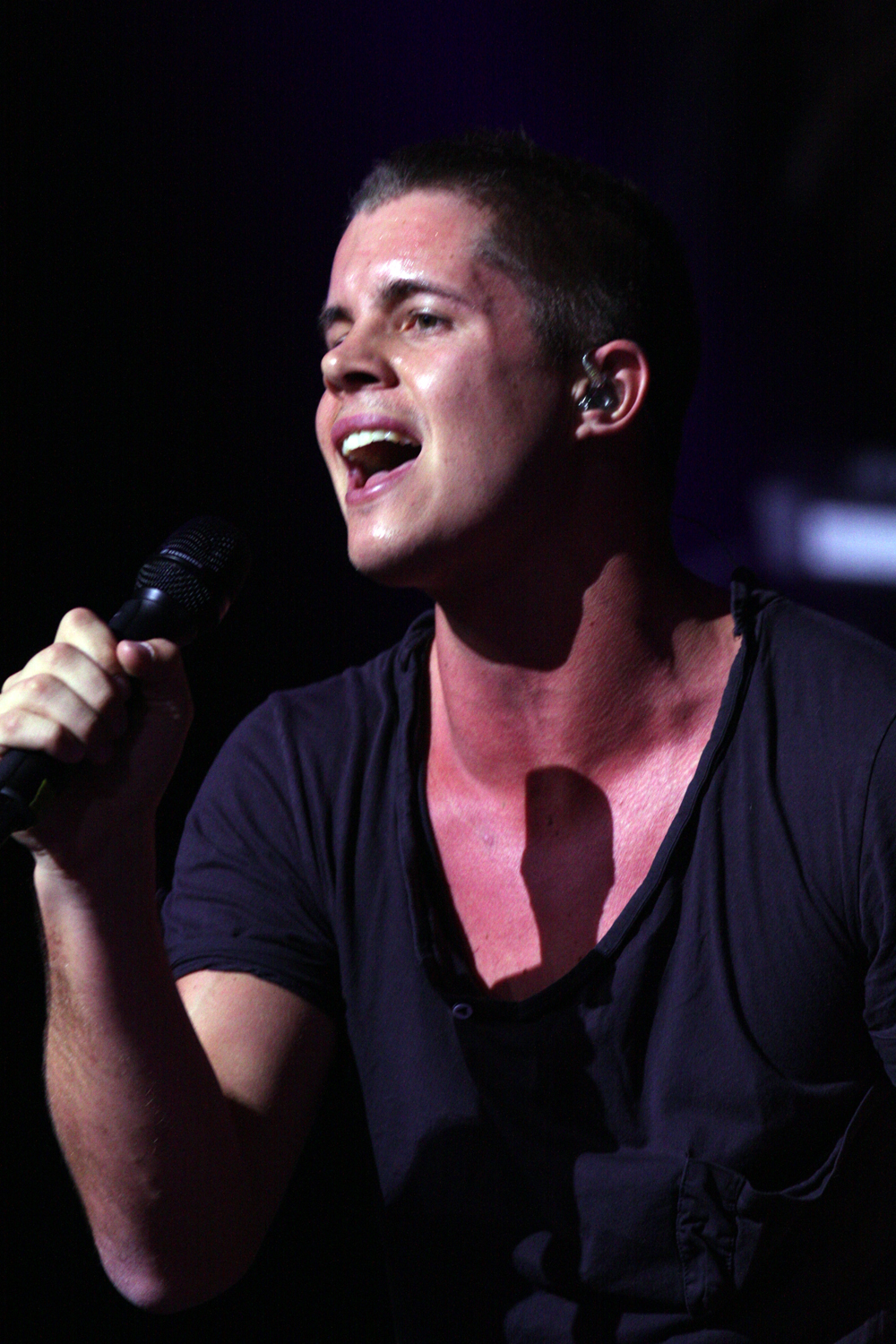
Johnny Ruffo

- 2 November – Bob Bugden, rugby league player (b. 1936)
- 4 November – Ken Timms, Australian rules footballer (b. 1938)
- 8 November – Marcus Besen, businessman and co-founder of Sussan (born in Romania) (b. 1923) (death announced on this date)
- 10 November – Johnny Ruffo, singer and actor (b. 1988)
- 12 November – Patrick Smith, sports journalist (b. 1952)
- 13 November – James Davern, television writer, producer and director
- 15 November – Gerry Hand, politician (b. 1942)
- 17 November –
  - Dennis Kemp, field hockey player (b. 1931)
  - Brian Sampson, racing driver (b. 1935)
  - Nan Witcomb, radio presenter and poet (b. c. 1928)
- 20 November –
  - Mike Craig, hockey player (b. 1931)
  - Ted Hopkins, Australian rules footballer (b. 1949)
- 21 November – Dale Spender, feminist writer (b. 1943)
- 23 November –
  - Tom Pauling, solicitor-general and administrator of Northern Territory (b.1946)
  - Paul Sait, rugby league player (b.1947)
- 24 November – Chris Stone, Australian rules footballer (b. 1959)
- 26 November – Maurie Considine, Australian rules footballer (b. 1932)

=== December ===
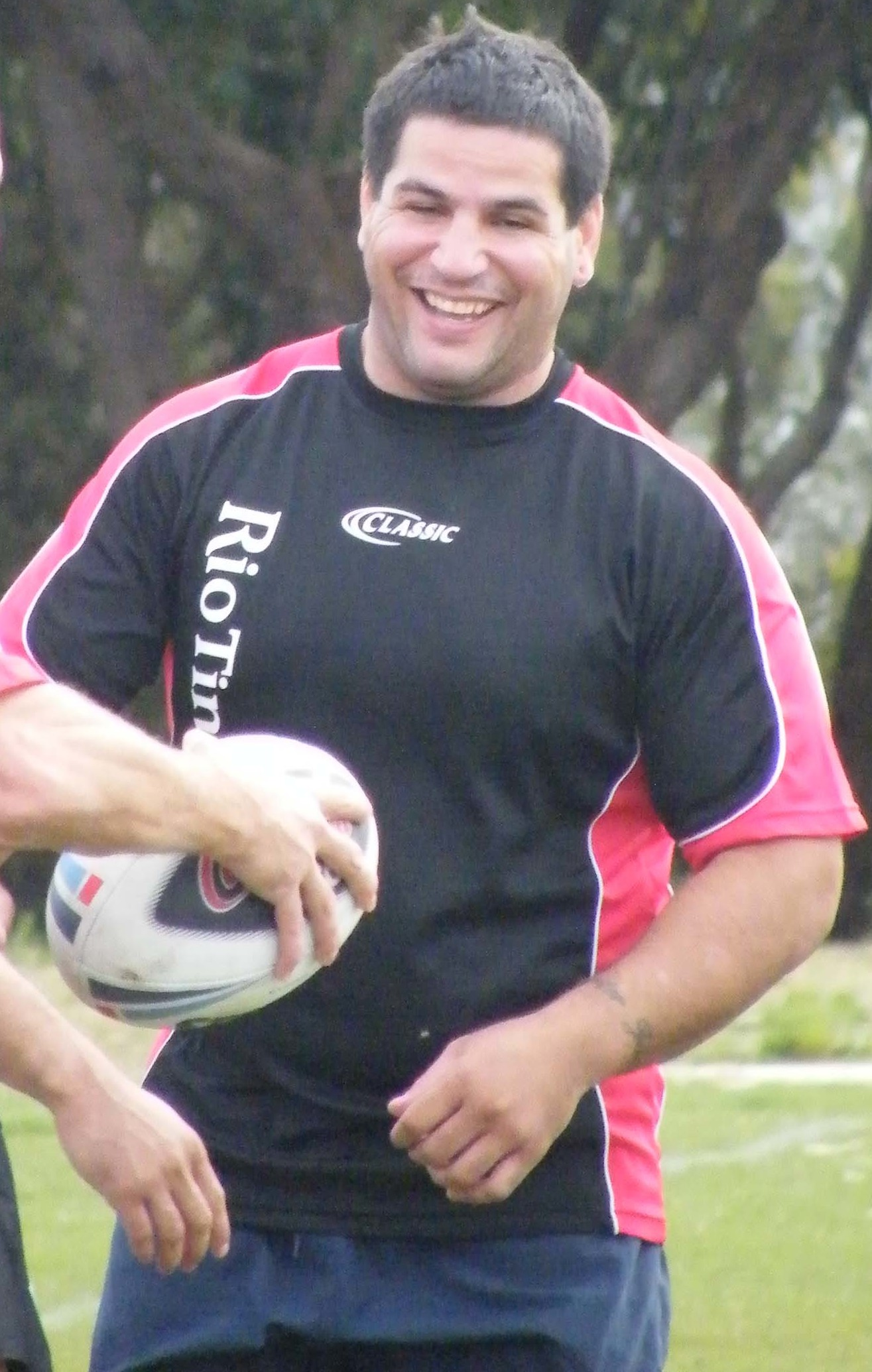
Carl Webb

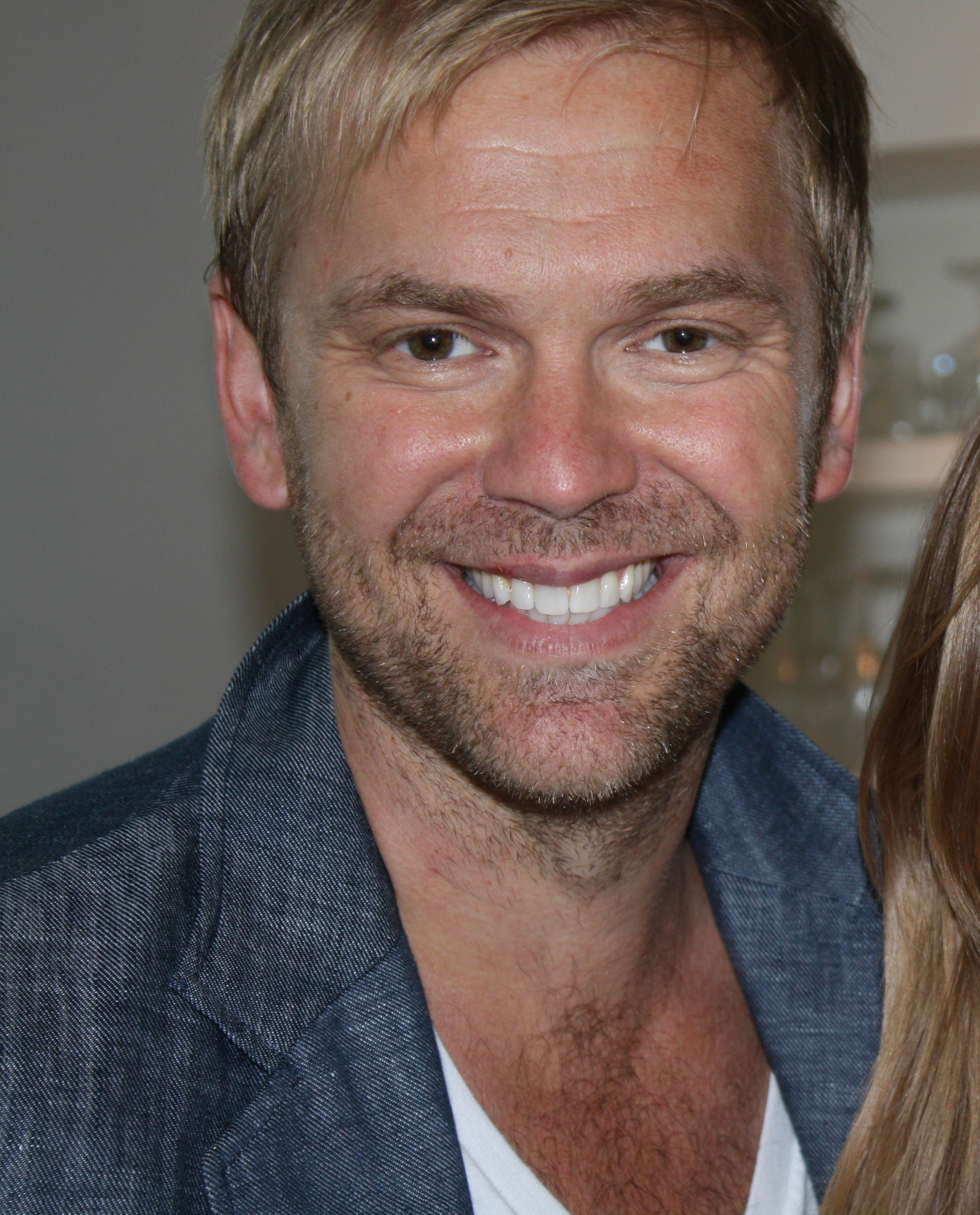
Bill Granger

- 4 December – Peta Murphy, politician (b. 1973)
- 6 December –
  - Fran Bladel, politician (b. 1933)
  - Kevin Wylie, Australian rules footballer (b. 1933)
- 10 December – Michael Blakemore, actor, writer and theatre director (b. 1928)
- 11 December – Phil Cooley, rugby league referee (b. 1951)
- 12 December – Shirley Barber, author (b. 1935)
- 16 December – Colin Burgess, rock drummer (The Masters Apprentices, AC/DC, His Majesty) (b. 1946) (death announced on this date)
- 19 December –
  - Darryl Cowie, Australian rules footballer (b. 1961)
  - Barry Wakelin, politician (b. 1946)
- 20 December – Franco Cozzo, businessman (b. 1936) (death announced on this date)
- 21 December – Carl Webb, rugby league player (b. 1981) (died in the Cook Islands)
- 23 December – Margaret Valadian, Indigenous educator (b. 1936)
- 24 December – Troy Dargan, rugby league player (b. 1997)
- 25 December – Bill Granger, celebrity chef (b. 1969) (died in the United Kingdom)
- 29 December – Mike Barnett, politician (b. 1946)
- 30 December – John Pilger, journalist and filmmaker (b. 1939) (died in the United Kingdom)
- 31 December – Melissa Hoskins, cyclist (b. 1991)

== See also ==
=== Country overviews ===
- 2020s in Australia political history
- History of Australia
- History of modern Australia
- Outline of Australia
- Government of Australia
- Politics of Australia
- Years in Australia
- Timeline of Australia history
- 2023 in Australian literature
- 2023 in Australian rules football
- 2023 in Australian television
- List of Australian films of 2023
