= Shark Tank (Australian TV series) season 1 =

Shark Tank
- Season 1
- Starring: Steve Baxter; Janine Allis; Andrew Banks; Naomi Simson; John McGrath
- No. of episodes: 15

Release
- Original network: Network Ten
- Original release: 8 February – 7 June 2015

Season chronology
- Next → Season 2

The first season of Shark Tank aired on Network Ten on 8 February 2015 and concluded 7 June 2015. The series was confirmed on 1 September 2014.

== Summary ==
The show features a panel of potential investors, named "Sharks", who listen to entrepreneurs pitch ideas for a business or product they wish to develop. These self-made multi-millionaires judge the business concepts and products pitched and then decide whether to invest their own money to help market and mentor each contestant.

== Investments by Shark ==
Shark	Offers Made	Deals Made	Total Investment
Janine	9	7	$1,076,000
Naomi	8	6	$960,000
Steve	12	8	$686,000
John	9	7	$655,000
Andrew	8	5	$372,000

== Episodes ==
=== Episode 1 ===
#	Entrepreneur(s)	Idea	Business Valuation	Initial Offer	Sharks Offers					Final Deal
#	Entrepreneur(s)	Idea	Business Valuation	Initial Offer	Steve	Janine	Andrew	Naomi	John	Final Deal
1	Adam Dubrich & Leigh Warren	"Cricket Cooler"; An esky with attached cricket stumps	$1.4 million	$280k for 20% Stake	—	—	—	$80k for 20% Stake + $200k Loan	—	Accepted Naomi's Initial Offer
1	Adam Dubrich & Leigh Warren	"Cricket Cooler"; An esky with attached cricket stumps	$1.4 million	Counter Offer $80k for 10% Stake + $200k Loan	—	—	—	$80k for 20% Stake + $200k Loan	—	Accepted Naomi's Initial Offer
2	Darren Smith	"Rent Resumé"; Online rental application subscription that details previous rental history	$6.25 million	$2.5m for 40% Stake	—	—	—	—	—	No Offers
3	Adam Riley	"Case Boards"; Portable, electric remote controlled skateboard that folds down to briefcase size	$200,000	$20k for 10% Stake	—	$40k for 50% Stake (Share with Andrew)	$20k for 25% Stake + $80k Loan	$20k for 15% Stake	$20k for 10% Stake + $50k Loan & $20 Royalty for first 1,000 boards	Accepted 2nd Revised Counter Offer
3	Adam Riley	"Case Boards"; Portable, electric remote controlled skateboard that folds down to briefcase size	$200,000	Counter Offer $40k for 30% Stake (Janine & Andrew)	—	$40k for 50% Stake (Share with Andrew)	$40k for 50% Stake (Share with Janine)	Revised Counter Offer $40k for 25% Stake + $50k Loan & $20 Royalty for first 1,000 boards (Share)		Accepted 2nd Revised Counter Offer
3	Adam Riley	"Case Boards"; Portable, electric remote controlled skateboard that folds down to briefcase size	$200,000	2nd Revised Counter Offer $40k for 35% Stake (Janine & Andrew)	—	Revised Counter Offer $40k for 40% Stake + $80k Loan (Share)		Revised Counter Offer $40k for 25% Stake + $50k Loan & $20 Royalty for first 1,000 boards (Share)		Accepted 2nd Revised Counter Offer
3	Adam Riley	"Case Boards"; Portable, electric remote controlled skateboard that folds down to briefcase size	$200,000	2nd Revised Counter Offer $40k for 35% Stake (Janine & Andrew)	—	Accepted 2nd Revised Counter Offer $40k for 35% Stake (Janine & Andrew)		Revised Counter Offer $40k for 25% Stake + $50k Loan & $20 Royalty for first 1,000 boards (Share)		Accepted 2nd Revised Counter Offer
4	Mark Murray	"Hamdog"; A hamburger and hot dog combination	$4	$1 for 25% Stake	—	—	$2 for 50% Stake	—	—	Accepted Offer

=== Episode 2 ===
#	Entrepreneur(s)	Idea	Business Valuation	Initial Offer	Sharks Offers					Final Deal
#	Entrepreneur(s)	Idea	Business Valuation	Initial Offer	Steve	Janine	Andrew	Naomi	John	Final Deal
1	Skye Blackburn	"Edible Bug Shop"; Edible insect business selling ground cricket flour	$850,000	$170k for 20% Stake	—	$170k for 50% Stake	—	—	—	Accepted Janine's Initial Offer
1	Skye Blackburn	"Edible Bug Shop"; Edible insect business selling ground cricket flour	$850,000	Counter Offer $170k for 30% Stake	—	$170k for 50% Stake	—	—	—	Accepted Janine's Initial Offer
2	James Palmer	"Lambdaton"; A commercial grade hexacopter, unmanned aerial vehicle	$1.5 million	$150k for 10% Stake	—	—	—	—	—	No Offers
3	Jennifer Holland	"Throat Scope"; An illuminated tongue depressant device	$760,000	$76k for 10% Stake	$76k for 30% Stake + 5% Royalty on Sales up to $76k	—	—	—	—	Accepted Steve's Initial Offer
3	Jennifer Holland	"Throat Scope"; An illuminated tongue depressant device	$760,000	Counter Offer $76k for 30% Stake	$76k for 30% Stake + 5% Royalty on Sales up to $76k	—	—	—	—	Accepted Steve's Initial Offer
4	Shae Calissa Teo	"Bento Pets"; A line of dog treats that human's can also consume	$2 million	$200k for 10% Stake	—	—	—	—	—	No Offers
5	Bruno Oppedisano & Paul Usatti	"PB Automotive Conveyor Tray"; A loading and unloading device	$588,235	$300k for 51% Stake	—	—	—	—	Connect with Toyota	No Offers

=== Episode 3 ===
#	Entrepreneur(s)	Idea	Business Valuation	Initial Offer	Sharks Offers					Final Deal
#	Entrepreneur(s)	Idea	Business Valuation	Initial Offer	Steve	Janine	Andrew	Naomi	John	Final Deal
1	Dave Smith	"Surfsafe"; A device that is embedded in surfboards to deter shark attacks	$2.4 million	$120k for 5% Stake	$120k for 45% Stake	—	—	—	—	Rejected Offer
2	Luke Wilson	"Captain Active"; A program encouraging kids and adults to be as active as they can	$250,000	$50k for 20% Stake	—	—	—	—	—	No Offers
3	Travis Osborne	"Mobile Tyre Shop"; A mobile car tyre fitting shop that comes to you to professionally fit and rebalance your tyres	$2.5 million	$250k for 10% Stake	$150k for 10% Stake + $100k Loan (Share with John)	—	$150k for 10% Stake + $100k Loan	—	$150k for 10% Stake + $100k Loan (Share with Steve)	Accepted Steve & John's Initial Offer
3	Travis Osborne	"Mobile Tyre Shop"; A mobile car tyre fitting shop that comes to you to professionally fit and rebalance your tyres	$2.5 million	Counter Offer $150k for 10% Stake + $100k Loan (Share)	$150k for 10% Stake + $100k Loan (Share with John)	—	$150k for 10% Stake + $100k Loan	—	$150k for 10% Stake + $100k Loan (Share with Steve)	Accepted Steve & John's Initial Offer
4	Anne Barclay	"Simply Moreish Marinades"; A homemade marinade business	$400,000	$80k for 20% Stake	—	—	—	—	—	No Offers
5	Daniel Baise	"TouchCo"; An interactive computer screen that can be activated on glass	$400,000	$60k for 15% Stake	Pay for Daniel to attend the Consumer Electronics Show in Las Vegas.					No Offers

=== Episode 4 ===
#	Entrepreneur(s)	Idea	Business Valuation	Initial Offer	Sharks Offers					Final Deal
#	Entrepreneur(s)	Idea	Business Valuation	Initial Offer	Steve	Janine	Andrew	Naomi	John	Final Deal
1	Alex Pirouz & Nicholas Dogulin	"Scope My Project"; Company that pairs businesses with web designers	$200,000	$50k for 20% Stake	—	—	—	—	—	No Offers
2	Simon Fiske	"Dr Drum Furniture"; Custom made furniture using oil drums	$757,575	$250k for 33% Stake	—	—	—	—	—	No Offers
3	Stan Kruss	"Expocentric"; A company that designs, constructs and project manages custom exhibition stands	$20 million	$2m for 10% Stake	$500k for 10% Stake + $1.5m after listing on ASX	—	—	—	—	Rejected Offer
4	Brooke 'Chookie' Annan	"Wiggin' Out"; Wigs with custom wig cap	$800,000	$96k for 12% Stake	—	—	—	—	—	No Offers
5	Giselle & Emilio Cano	"Salsa Ranchero"; Mexican Sauce and Salsa Business	$200,000	$60k for 30% Stake	—	$75k for 40% Stake + 6% Royalty on Wholesale Cost	—	—	$80k for 40% Stake	Accepted John's Offer

=== Episode 5 ===
#	Entrepreneur(s)	Idea	Business Valuation	Initial Offer	Sharks Offers					Final Deal
#	Entrepreneur(s)	Idea	Business Valuation	Initial Offer	Steve	Janine	Andrew	Naomi	John	Final Deal
1	Joseph Mourad	"Hair Dryer / Straightener"; Styling tool that combines a hair dryer and straightener	$5 million	$1m for 20% Stake	—	—	—	—	—	No Offers
2	Tracey Beikoff	"Rescue Swag"; Comprehensive first aid kit that doubles as a sling, splint, compression device and water carrier	$1.1 million	$220k for 20% Stake	$100k for 40% Stake + $10 Repayment Royalty per item for $120k	—	—	—	—	Accepted Offer
3	Jaime Turner & Cheryl Stewart	"Koala Karma"; A relaxation drink	$666,666	$100k for 15% Stake	—	—	—	—	—	No Offers
4	Scott Boocock	"Hegs Pegs"; A peg with hooks	$3.8 million	$380k for 10% Stake	$380k for 35% Stake + 5% Repayment Royalty on sales up to $380k	—	—	$100k for 15% Stake + 280k Loan	—	Accepted Naomi's Offer
5	Brian Dyskin	"Dyskin Guitars"; A specially designed guitar with numbers to make learning it easy	$200,000	$36k for 18% Stake + Handmade 'Shark' Guitar	—	—	$7k for Guitar	—	—	No Offers

=== Episode 6 ===
#	Entrepreneur(s)	Idea	Business Valuation	Initial Offer	Sharks Offers					Final Deal
#	Entrepreneur(s)	Idea	Business Valuation	Initial Offer	Steve	Janine	Andrew	Naomi	John	Final Deal
1	Ash Newland	"Scrubba Wash Bag"; A portable washing machine for travel, camping and sportswear	$2.2 million	$178k for 8% Stake	$180k for 15% Stake	$204k for 17% Stake	—	$200k for 20% Stake	—	Accepted Steve and Janine's Counter Offer
1	Ash Newland	"Scrubba Wash Bag"; A portable washing machine for travel, camping and sportswear	$2.2 million	Counter Offer; Asking for a two shark partnership	Counter Offer $360k for 30% Stake (Share)	Counter Offer $360k for 30% Stake (Share)	—	Counter Offer $360k for 30% Stake (Share)	—	Accepted Steve and Janine's Counter Offer
2	Kerry Staite	"K-Lite"; A dynamo light for bicycles	$200,000	$50k for 25% Stake	—	—	—	—	—	No Offers
3	Kate Rose & Jaye Rose	"Evil Corp"; An all-year-round purpose-built, live haunted attraction	$1.25 million	$500k for 40% Stake	—	—	—	Red Balloon marketing	—	No Offers
4	Stephen Brooks & Greg Jury	"Bottlepops"; Talking, sports themed bottle openers	$633,333	$500k for 40% Stake	$95k for 15% Stake	—	$180k for 50% Stake (Share with Steve)	—	—	Accepted Counter Offer
4	Stephen Brooks & Greg Jury	"Bottlepops"; Talking, sports themed bottle openers	$633,333	Counter Offer $150k for 40% Stake (Share)	Accepted Counter Offer $150k for 40% Stake (Share)	—	Accepted Counter Offer $150k for 40% Stake (Share)	—	—	Accepted Counter Offer

=== Episode 7 ===
#	Entrepreneur(s)	Idea	Business Valuation	Initial Offer	Sharks Offers					Final Deal
#	Entrepreneur(s)	Idea	Business Valuation	Initial Offer	Steve	Janine	Andrew	Naomi	John	Final Deal
1	David Hill	"DHD Skate"; A skateboard truck mechanism that increases stability	$800,000	$160k for 20% Stake	—	—	—	—	—	No Offers
2	Dean Salakas	"The Party People"; Party supplies company	$8 million	$400k for 5% Stake	—	Asking for higher equity counter offer	—	—	—	Janine Rejected Counter Offer
2	Dean Salakas	"The Party People"; Party supplies company	$8 million	$400k for 10% Stake	—	Rejected Counter Offer	—	—	—	Janine Rejected Counter Offer
3	Megan Van Oirschot	"Freckleberry"; Chocolate wholesale business	$1.75 million	$350k for 20% Stake	—	—	—	—	—	No Offers
4	Rebecca Glover & Leah James	"Hummingbirds"; An all-abilities childcare facility	$400,000	$80k for 20% Stake	$80k for 25% Stake	—	—	—	$80k for 25% Stake (Share with Steve)	Accepted Offer
4	Rebecca Glover & Leah James	"Hummingbirds"; An all-abilities childcare facility	$400,000	$80k for 20% Stake	$80k for 25% Stake (Share with John)	—	—	—	$80k for 25% Stake (Share with Steve)	Accepted Offer

=== Episode 8 ===
#	Entrepreneur(s)	Idea	Business Valuation	Initial Offer	Sharks Offers					Final Deal
#	Entrepreneur(s)	Idea	Business Valuation	Initial Offer	Steve	Janine	Andrew	Naomi	John	Final Deal
1	Joel Sneeuwjagt & Nathan Baws	"Tommy Sugo"; A spaghetti and espresso restaurant	$2.33 million	$350k for 15% Stake	—	$150k for 51% Stake + $200k Loan	—	—	—	Accepted Counter Offer
1	Joel Sneeuwjagt & Nathan Baws	"Tommy Sugo"; A spaghetti and espresso restaurant	$2.33 million	Counter Offer $150k for 50% Stake + $200k Loan	—	Accepted Counter Offer $150k for 50% Stake + $200k Loan	—	—	—	Accepted Counter Offer
2	Suzanne Bosanquet & Lisa O'Keefe	"Stink Brothers"; Natural deodorant targeted at male adolescence	$500,000	$50k for 10% Stake	—	—	—	—	—	No Offers
3	Gladys Mackenzie	"Gladmac"; A tongue scraper	$1.25 million	$250k for 20% Stake	—	—	—	—	—	No Offers
4	Kym Huynh	"We Teach Me"; An online marketplace for student courses	$8 million	$200k for 2.5% Stake	—	—	$200k for 40% Stake	—	—	Rejected Offer

=== Episode 9 ===
#	Entrepreneur(s)	Idea	Business Valuation	Initial Offer	Sharks Offers					Final Deal
#	Entrepreneur(s)	Idea	Business Valuation	Initial Offer	Steve	Janine	Andrew	Naomi	John	Final Deal
1	Hani & Meray Yassa	"CharliChair"; A portable baby shower chair	$4 million	$200k for 5% Stake	—	—	—	—	$100k for 50% Stake + 100k Loan	Accepted Offer
2	Hugh Minson & Richard Horden-Gibbings	"Nexus Notes"; An online marketplace for students to buy and sell course notes	$4 million	$300k for 7.5% Stake	—	—	—	—	—	No Offers
3	Sophie Gilliatt & Katherine Westwood	"The Dinner Ladies"; Dinner Ladies: Hot to Go, a spin-off of the original business, The Dinner Ladies	$424,242	$140k for 33% Stake	Asking for inclusion of original business	Asking for inclusion of original business	—	—	—	Accepted Janine's Initial Offer
3	Sophie Gilliatt & Katherine Westwood	"The Dinner Ladies"; Dinner Ladies: Hot to Go, a spin-off of the original business, The Dinner Ladies	$424,242	$500k for 33% Stake (in Dinner Ladies)	Asking for inclusion of original business	$216k for 33% Stake	—	—	—	Accepted Janine's Initial Offer
3	Sophie Gilliatt & Katherine Westwood	"The Dinner Ladies"; Dinner Ladies: Hot to Go, a spin-off of the original business, The Dinner Ladies	$424,242	Counter Offer $400k for 33% Stake	Asking for inclusion of original business	$216k for 33% Stake	—	—	—	Accepted Janine's Initial Offer

=== Episode 10 ===
#	Entrepreneur(s)	Idea	Business Valuation	Initial Offer	Sharks Offers					Final Deal
#	Entrepreneur(s)	Idea	Business Valuation	Initial Offer	Steve	Janine	Andrew	Naomi	John	Final Deal
1	Jeff Phillips	"Grown Wooden Eyewear"; Bamboo and wooden sunglasses	$300,000	$60k for 20% Stake	—	—	—	$60k for 51% Stake	$40k for 40% Stake + $20k Loan (Share with Naomi)	Accepted Offer
1	Jeff Phillips	"Grown Wooden Eyewear"; Bamboo and wooden sunglasses	$300,000	$60k for 20% Stake	—	—	—	$40k for 40% Stake + $20k Loan (Share with John)	$40k for 40% Stake + $20k Loan (Share with Naomi)	Accepted Offer
2	Stefanie Miro	"Rich Gurl"; A website which gathers online clothes sales in one place	$250,000	$50k for 20% Stake	—	—	—	—	—	No Offers
3	Steve Dunn	"Leapin Digital Keys"; An app that allows users to open their hotel door locks from their smartphone	$2.5 million	$75k for 3% Stake	—	—	—	—	—	No Offers
4	Oliver Du Rieu	"La Mule"; A carpooling service	$1 million	$50k for 5% Stake	—	—	—	—	—	No Offers

=== Episode 11 ===
#	Entrepreneur(s)	Idea	Business Valuation	Initial Offer	Sharks Offers					Final Deal
#	Entrepreneur(s)	Idea	Business Valuation	Initial Offer	Steve	Janine	Andrew	Naomi	John	Final Deal
1	Grant Burns & John Gorman	"Ampan"; A product made from agricultural waste for building construction	$2.5 million	$500k for 20% Stake	—	—	—	—	—	No Offers
2	Shey Newitt & Ted Tolfree	"Crisp"; A raw salad bar business	$7 million	$700k for 10% Stake	$350k for 21% Stake	—	—	—	—	No Offers
2	Shey Newitt & Ted Tolfree	"Crisp"; A raw salad bar business	$7 million	$700k for 10% Stake	Offer Withdrawn	—	—	—	—	No Offers
3	Robbie Adams	"Mobilyser"; An app that separates work related calls from personal calls for tax purposes	$4 million	$1m for 25% Stake	—	—	—	—	—	No Offers
4	Emma Lovell	"Fly Babee Travel Made Easy"; A pop up sleep cover for airline bassinets and strollers	$500,000	$50k for 10% Stake	—	$100k for 50% Stake	—	—	—	Accepted Revised Offer
4	Emma Lovell	"Fly Babee Travel Made Easy"; A pop up sleep cover for airline bassinets and strollers	$500,000	Counter Offer $100k for 35% Stake	—	Revised Offer $80k for 38% Stake	—	—	—	Accepted Revised Offer

=== Episode 12 ===
#	Entrepreneur(s)	Idea	Business Valuation	Initial Offer	Sharks Offers					Final Deal
#	Entrepreneur(s)	Idea	Business Valuation	Initial Offer	Steve	Janine	Andrew	Naomi	John	Final Deal
1	Will Strange	"Three65 Underwear"; Men's underwear subscription business	$400,000	$60k for 15% Stake	—	$60k for 50% Stake + $60k Loan (Share with Naomi)	—	$60k for 50% Stake	—	Accepted Janine & Naomi's Initial Offer
1	Will Strange	"Three65 Underwear"; Men's underwear subscription business	$400,000	Counter Offer $60k for 40% Stake + $60k Loan (Share)	—	$60k for 50% Stake + $60k Loan (Share with Naomi)	—	$60k for 50% Stake + $60k Loan (Share with Janine)	—	Accepted Janine & Naomi's Initial Offer
2	Michael, Franco & Carl	"Headvert"; Fully assembled, flatpacked custom promotional hats	$800,000	$200k for 25% Stake	—	—	—	—	—	No Offers
3	Ryan Olsen & Mark Pollard	"Supreme Incursions"; Business which runs incursions for schools	$1.6 million	$80k for 5% Stake	—	—	—	—	—	No Offers
4	Kate Johansson	"Koja"; A range of superfood toppers	$600,000	$150k for 25% Stake	—	—	—	—	$50k for 50% Stake + $100k Loan	Accepted Counter Offer
4	Kate Johansson	"Koja"; A range of superfood toppers	$600,000	Counter Offer $50k for 45% Stake + $100k Loan	—	—	—	—	Accepted Counter Offer $50k for 45% Stake + $100k Loan	Accepted Counter Offer

=== Episode 13 ===
#	Entrepreneur(s)	Idea	Business Valuation	Initial Offer	Sharks Offers					Final Deal
#	Entrepreneur(s)	Idea	Business Valuation	Initial Offer	Steve	Janine	Andrew	Naomi	John	Final Deal
1	Peter & Kristina Stojkovski	"Hipsta"; A clip on water bottle holder	$1.25 million	$250k for 20% Stake	—	—	—	—	—	No Offers
2	Albert David & Robin Fester	"Flexsil-Lid"; Reusable, watertight lids for bain marie pans	$3 million	$300k for 10% Stake	—	—	—	—	—	No Offers
3	Tracey & Lorne Fulwood	"pottytraining.com.au" A toilet training business	$700,000	$140k for 20% Stake	—	—	—	—	—	No Offers
4	Rachel Ferguson & Marie Lewis	"Synxsole"; Easy fit orthotics, insoles and shoe inserts	$444,444	$100k for 22.5% Stake	$100k for 35% Stake + 7% Repayment Royalty on sales up to $110k	—	$100k for 45% Stake	—	$100k for 45% Stake	Accepted Andrew's Offer

=== Episode 14 ===
#	Entrepreneur(s)	Idea	Business Valuation	Initial Offer	Sharks Offers					Final Deal
#	Entrepreneur(s)	Idea	Business Valuation	Initial Offer	Steve	Janine	Andrew	Naomi	John	Final Deal
1	Hayley Warren	"Halo Medical Devices"; A digital goniometer used by physiotherapists	$952,380	$200k for 21% Stake	—	—	$100k for 21% Stake + $100k Loan (Share with Naomi)	$100k for 21% Stake + $100k Loan	—	Accepted Naomi & Andrew's Offer
1	Hayley Warren	"Halo Medical Devices"; A digital goniometer used by physiotherapists	$952,380	$200k for 21% Stake	—	—	$100k for 21% Stake + $100k Loan (Share with Naomi)	$100k for 21% Stake + $100k Loan (Share with Andrew)	—	Accepted Naomi & Andrew's Offer
2	David Kay	"S2B Smart Shower"; Walk in shower with bath conversion	$1.33 million	$200k for 15% Stake	—	—	—	—	—	No Offers
3	Melissa Pye	"Smudgi"; A microfibre cloth with a sticky backing used to clean device screens	$200,000	$60k for 30% Stake	—	—	—	—	—	No Offers
4	Kylie Bradford	"Piccaninny Tiny Tots"; Children's clothing using authentic Aboriginal art from Kakadu	$200,000	$40k for 20% Stake	$20k for 40% Stake + $20k Loan (Share with John)	—	—	—	$20k for 40% Stake + $20k Loan (Share with Steve)	Accepted John & Steve's Offer

=== Episode 15 ===
#	Entrepreneur(s)	Idea	Business Valuation	Initial Offer	Sharks Offers					Final Deal
#	Entrepreneur(s)	Idea	Business Valuation	Initial Offer	Steve	Janine	Andrew	Naomi	John	Final Deal
1	Vanessa Babuin	"Sonsee Woman"; Hosiery for plus size women	$250,000	$50k for 20% Stake	—	—	$60k for 40% Stake	$20k for 20% Stake + $80k Loan	—	Accepted Naomi's Offer
2	Joanne Rathbone & Michelle Crofts	"Mr. Browne"; A male self-tanning business	$350,000	$70k for 20% Stake	—	—	—	—	—	No Offers
3	Bryce McDougall	"Bryces"; A chain of studio apartment motels	$4.4 million	$1.98m for 45% Stake	—	—	—	—	—	No Offers
4	Lauren Davie & Elena Andoniou	"Those Girls Iced Tea"; A homemade iced tea business	$466,666	$70k for 15% Stake	$70k for 40% Stake	—	—	—	—	Accepted Offer

== Ratings ==
No.	Title	Air date	Timeslot	Overnight ratings		Ref(s)
No.	Title	Air date	Timeslot	Viewers	Rank	Ref(s)
1	Episode 1	8 February 2015	Sunday 8:00 pm	616,000	11	
2	Episode 2	15 February 2015	Sunday 8:00 pm	688,000	11	
3	Episode 3	22 February 2015	Sunday 8:00 pm	739,000	10	
4	Episode 4	1 March 2015	Sunday 8:00 pm	724,000	10	
5	Episode 5	8 March 2015	Sunday 8:00 pm	710,000	9	
6	Episode 6	15 March 2015	Sunday 8:00 pm	973,000	10	
7	Episode 7	22 March 2015	Sunday 8:00 pm	638,000	10	
8	Episode 8	29 March 2015	Sunday 8:00 pm	587,000	7	
9	Episode 9	12 April 2015	Sunday 8:00 pm	527,000	12	
10	Episode 10	19 April 2015	Sunday 8:00 pm	548,000	12	
11	Episode 11	26 April 2015	Sunday 8:00 pm	480,000	13	
12	Episode 12	10 May 2015	Sunday 8:00 pm	656,000	10	
13	Episode 13	17 May 2015	Sunday 8:00 pm	559,000	13	
14	Episode 14	31 May 2015	Sunday 8:00 pm	729,000	8	
15	Episode 15	7 June 2015	Sunday 8:00 pm	568,000	9	
