= Shark Tank (Australian TV series) season 3 =

Shark Tank
- Season 3
- Starring: Steve Baxter; Janine Allis; Andrew Banks; Naomi Simson; Glen Richards
- No. of episodes: 13

Release
- Original network: Network Ten
- Original release: 20 June – 19 September 2017

Season chronology
- ← Previous; Season 2 Next → Season 4

The third season of Shark Tank aired on Network Ten from 20 June 2017. The series was confirmed following the season 2 finale.

== Summary ==
The show features a panel of potential investors, named "Sharks", who listen to entrepreneurs pitch ideas for a business or product they wish to develop. These self-made multi-millionaires judge the business concepts and products pitched and then decide whether to invest their own money to help market and mentor each contestant.

== Investments by Shark ==
Correct as of Episode 9

Shark	Offers Made	Deals Made	Total Investment
Andrew	8	6	$3,275,015
Glen	8	5	$995,000 + mentoring
Naomi	8	5	$850,015
Steve	12	3	$600,000 + mentoring
Janine	9	3	$500,000 + mentoring x2

== Episodes ==
=== Episode 1 ===
#	Entrepreneur(s)	Idea	Business Valuation	Initial Offer	Sharks Offers					Final Deal
#	Entrepreneur(s)	Idea	Business Valuation	Initial Offer	Steve	Janine	Andrew	Naomi	Glen	Final Deal
1	Dr. Nikhol Pooviah, Dr. Raghav Murali-Ganesh & Dr. Martin Seneviratne	"CancerAid"; An app that personalises cancer information for patients and caregivers	$5 million	$500k for 10% Stake	—	$500k for 10% Stake	$500k for 10% Stake	$500k for 10% Stake	$500k for 10% Stake	Accepted Counter Offer
1	Dr. Nikhol Pooviah, Dr. Raghav Murali-Ganesh & Dr. Martin Seneviratne	"CancerAid"; An app that personalises cancer information for patients and caregivers	$5 million	Counter Offer $250k for 5% Stake each (Andrew & Glen)	$250k for 5% Stake (Share with Glen)	$500k for 10% Stake	$250k for 9% Stake (single offer)	$500k for 10% Stake	$500k for 10% Stake	Accepted Counter Offer
1	Dr. Nikhol Pooviah, Dr. Raghav Murali-Ganesh & Dr. Martin Seneviratne	"CancerAid"; An app that personalises cancer information for patients and caregivers	$5 million	Counter Offer $250k for 5% Stake each (Andrew & Glen)	$250k for 5% Stake (Share with Glen)	$500k for 10% Stake	Accepted Counter Offer $250k for 5% Stake (Share)	$500k for 10% Stake	Accepted Counter Offer $250k for 5% Stake (Share)	Accepted Counter Offer
2	Barry Rahme	"Mini Clones"; 3D scanning which creates replicated figurines	$500,000	$125k for 25% Stake	—	—	—	—	—	No Offers
3	Aleksandar Svetski	"iRecruit"; Technology that ranks resumes to find best suit job applicant	$9 million	$200k for 2.2% Stake	—	—	—	—	—	No Offers
4	Jenny Holten	"Strange Grains"; A wholesale artisan bakery selling gluten free bread	$3.5 million	$350k for 10% Stake	—	—	—	$350k for 25% Stake	—	Accepted Naomi's Initial Offer
4	Jenny Holten	"Strange Grains"; A wholesale artisan bakery selling gluten free bread	$3.5 million	Counter Offer $350k for 20% Stake	—	—	—	$350k for 25% Stake	—	Accepted Naomi's Initial Offer

=== Episode 2 ===
#	Entrepreneur(s)	Idea	Business Valuation	Initial Offer	Sharks Offers					Final Deal
#	Entrepreneur(s)	Idea	Business Valuation	Initial Offer	Steve	Janine	Andrew	Naomi	Glen	Final Deal
1	Paris Marchant & Lawrence Lees	"Generation Outcast Clothing"; An online women's clothing company	$900,000	$90k for 10% Stake	Asking for higher equity counter offer	—	—	—	—	Steve Rejected Counter Offer
1	Paris Marchant & Lawrence Lees	"Generation Outcast Clothing"; An online women's clothing company	$900,000	Counter Offer $90k for 12.5% Stake	Rejected Counter Offer	—	—	—	—	Steve Rejected Counter Offer
2	Dylan Colman & Tom Smith	"The Hammbag"; An all-in-one hammock, backpack and towel	$300,000	$45k for 15% Stake	—	—	—	—	—	No Offers
3	Margaret & Peter Powell	"Catch 'N' Release"; An anchor retrieval company that eliminates damage to the ocean	$1 million	$200k for 20% Stake	—	—	—	Mentorship	200k for 100% Stake + 5% Royalty	Accepted Offer
4	Capital M	"Hoo Haa Headphones"; Headphones with a retractable lead	$100	$20 for 20% Stake	—	—	$40 for 40% Stake (Share with Naomi)	$40 for 40% Stake (Share with Andrew)	—	Accepted Counter Offer
4	Capital M	"Hoo Haa Headphones"; Headphones with a retractable lead	$100	Counter Offer $30 for 30% Stake each	—	—	Accepted Counter Offer $30 for 30% Stake (Share)		—	Accepted Counter Offer

=== Episode 3 ===
#	Entrepreneur(s)	Idea	Business Valuation	Initial Offer	Sharks Offers					Final Deal
#	Entrepreneur(s)	Idea	Business Valuation	Initial Offer	Steve	Janine	Andrew	Naomi	Glen	Final Deal
1	Heather Day	"Hey Day Butter"; An artisan brand of gourmet butter	$200,000	$50k for 25% Stake	$50k for 25% Stake + 50c Repayment Royalty per portion for $25k	—	—	$50k for 33% Stake	—	Accepted Naomi's Offer
2	Jasmine Zapka & Andrew Eastoe	"The Pole Room"; A pole dancing for fitness program	$667,000	$100k for 15% Stake	—	Mentorship	—	—	—	No Offers
3	Lourens Badenhorst	"Fish Frenz"; A wave energy conversion fish feeding pump	$622,000	$56k for 9% Stake	—	—	—	—	—	No Offers
4	Kane Bodiam	"iCapsulate"; A coffee company specialising in capsules, pods and roasted beans	$16.6 million	$2.5m for 15% Stake	—	—	$2.5m for 25% Stake	$2.5m for 33.3% Stake	$2.5m for 40% Stake	Accepted Revised Offer
4	Kane Bodiam	"iCapsulate"; A coffee company specialising in capsules, pods and roasted beans	$16.6 million	Counter Offer $2.5m for 20% Stake (Andrew)	—	—	Revised Offer $2.5m for 22.5% Stake	$2.5m for 33.3% Stake	$2.5m for 40% Stake	Accepted Revised Offer

=== Episode 4 ===
#	Entrepreneur(s)	Idea	Business Valuation	Initial Offer	Sharks Offers					Final Deal
#	Entrepreneur(s)	Idea	Business Valuation	Initial Offer	Steve	Janine	Andrew	Naomi	Glen	Final Deal
1	Alex Houseman	"Over The Moo"; Lactose-free coconut milk ice cream	$3.125 million	$250k for 8% Stake	$250k for 25% Stake	$250k for 49% Stake	—	—	$250k for 25% Stake	Glen Rejected Counter Offer
1	Alex Houseman	"Over The Moo"; Lactose-free coconut milk ice cream	$3.125 million	Counter Offer $250k for 15% Stake	Offer Withdrawn	Offer Rejected	—	—	Rejected Counter Offer	Glen Rejected Counter Offer
2	Peter Kuhlmann	"Mini Pallets"; Product which raises goods off the ground allowing for easy moving access underneath	$1 million	$200k for 20% Stake	—	—	$200k for 25% Stake	$300k for 40% Stake (Share with Andrew)	$200k for 25% Stake	Accepted Counter Offer
2	Peter Kuhlmann	"Mini Pallets"; Product which raises goods off the ground allowing for easy moving access underneath	$1 million	Counter Offer $400k for 40% Stake (Naomi & Andrew)	—	—	Accepted Counter Offer $400k for 40% Stake Stake (Share)		$200k for 25% Stake	Accepted Counter Offer
3	Maree Machin	"Tractag"; A QR identification tag	$2 million	$200k for 10% Stake	—	—	—	—	—	No Offers
4	Lauren Silvers & Lisa Maree Boersma	"Glamazon"; Online booking company for beauty services	$1.67 million	$250k for 15% Stake	Asking for higher equity counter offer	—	—	—	—	Accepted Counter Offer
4	Lauren Silvers & Lisa Maree Boersma	"Glamazon"; Online booking company for beauty services	$1.67 million	Counter Offer $250k for 25% Stake	Accepted Counter Offer $250k for 25% Stake	—	—	—	—	Accepted Counter Offer

=== Episode 5 ===
#	Entrepreneur(s)	Idea	Business Valuation	Initial Offer	Sharks Offers					Final Deal
#	Entrepreneur(s)	Idea	Business Valuation	Initial Offer	Steve	Janine	Andrew	Naomi	Glen	Final Deal
1	Kim Macrae	"iKiFit"; A learning program which engages children through music and movement	$2.5 million	$250k for 10% Stake	—	—	—	—	—	No Offers
2	Jade Castle	"Kaf.Tanned"; A line of kaftans to be worn after a spray tan	$1.5 million	$150k for 10% Stake	$50k for 25% Stake + $100k Loan	—	—	—	—	Accepted Offer
3	Brett Page	"Cellarwraps"; Greeting card labels for bottles of wine	$850,000	$170k for 20% Stake	—	—	$170k for 30% Stake	—	$170k for 40% Stake	Accepted Glen's Counter Offer
3	Brett Page	"Cellarwraps"; Greeting card labels for bottles of wine	$850,000	$170k for 20% Stake	—	—	$170k for 30% Stake	—	Counter Offer $170k for 30% Stake	Accepted Glen's Counter Offer
4	Winston Wijeyeratne & Selvam Sinnappan	"Sleeping Duck"; A customisable mattress	$10 million	$500k for 5% Stake	$500k for 15% Stake	—	$500k for 25% Stake	—	—	Rejected Steve's Offer
4	Winston Wijeyeratne & Selvam Sinnappan	"Sleeping Duck"; A customisable mattress	$10 million	Counter Offer $500k for 10% Stake	$500k for 15% Stake	—	$500k for 20% Stake + $20 Repayment Royalty per mattress up to $500k	—	—	Rejected Steve's Offer
4	Winston Wijeyeratne & Selvam Sinnappan	"Sleeping Duck"; A customisable mattress	$10 million	Counter Offer $500k for 10% Stake	$500k for 15% Stake	—	Rejected Counter Offer	—	—	Rejected Steve's Offer

=== Episode 6 ===
#	Entrepreneur(s)	Idea	Business Valuation	Initial Offer	Sharks Offers					Final Deal
#	Entrepreneur(s)	Idea	Business Valuation	Initial Offer	Steve	Janine	Andrew	Naomi	Glen	Final Deal
1	Kjetil Hansen	"Deliciou"; A vegetarian bacon flavoured seasoning	$1.2 million	$300k for 25% Stake	—	—	$300k for 45% Stake	—	—	Accepted Revised Offer
1	Kjetil Hansen	"Deliciou"; A vegetarian bacon flavoured seasoning	$1.2 million	$300k for 25% Stake	—	—	"Accepted Revised Offer" $300k for 44% Stake	—	—	Accepted Revised Offer
2	Tony Croce, Mike Nayer & David Jardine	"The Guitar Strap Co."; Custom designed guitar straps	$1 million	$100k for 10% Stake	—	$100k for 25% Stake	—	—	—	Accepted Offer
3	Ben Burton	"Zeppee"; An app that connects adoptable pets with potential owners	$500,000	$50k for 10% Stake	—	—	—	—	—	No Offers
4	Indi Sutton	"The Monday Food Co."; Handmade, organic, paleo granola	$1.2 million	$300k for 25% Stake	—	—	—	—	$100k for 40% Stake + $200k Loan	Accepted Offer

=== Episode 7 ===
#	Entrepreneur(s)	Idea	Business Valuation	Initial Offer	Sharks Offers					Final Deal
#	Entrepreneur(s)	Idea	Business Valuation	Initial Offer	Steve	Janine	Andrew	Naomi	Glen	Final Deal
1	Patrick Gaskin & Tom Clift	"Cardly"; An online card sending service	$3.57 million	$250k for 7% Stake	$250k for 33.3% Stake	$250k for 30% Stake	—	$250k for 33.3% Stake	—	Accepted Naomi's 2nd Counter Offer
1	Patrick Gaskin & Tom Clift	"Cardly"; An online card sending service	$3.57 million	$250k for 7% Stake	$250k for 33.3% Stake	Offer Withdrawal	—	1st Counter Offer $150k for 15% Stake + $100k Loan that converts to additional 10% Stake	—	Accepted Naomi's 2nd Counter Offer
1	Patrick Gaskin & Tom Clift	"Cardly"; An online card sending service	$3.57 million	$250k for 7% Stake	Counter Offer $250k for 20% Stake	Offer Withdrawal	—	2nd Counter Offer $150k for 15% Stake + $100k Loan that converts to additional 5% Stake	—	Accepted Naomi's 2nd Counter Offer
2	Brad Webb	"360 Gym"; A portable, outdoor strength training gym	$1 million	$200k for 20% Stake	Mentorship	—	—	—	Mentorship	No Offers
3	Chrissy Glentis & Luke Lucas	"Foddies"; A specialty food brand for people with food intolerance and allergies	$1 million	$100k for 10% Stake	—	$100k for 40% Stake	—	—	—	Accepted Offer

=== Episode 8 ===
#	Entrepreneur(s)	Idea	Business Valuation	Initial Offer	Sharks Offers					Final Deal
#	Entrepreneur(s)	Idea	Business Valuation	Initial Offer	Steve	Janine	Andrew	Naomi	Glen	Final Deal
1	Kate Save & Dr. Geoffrey Draper	"Be Fit Food"; Meal plan programs for rapid weight loss	$1.5 million	$300k for 20% Stake	$300k for 33.3% Stake	$200k for 33.3% Stake + $100k Loan	—	—	—	Accepted Janine's Offer
2	Paul Cameron, Sam Davies & Seth Tonkin	"Beer Pal"; An app that shows where your favourite beers are on special	$2 million	$300k for 15% Stake	—	—	—	—	—	No Offers
3	Bethany Grace Spoor	"Bethany Grace"; A natural skincare company	$133,000	$40k for 30% Stake	—	Mentorship	—	—	—	No Offers
4	Matt Natonewski	"Nevermind Adventure"; A motorcycle touring and leather goods company	$1.33 million	$200k for 15% Stake	$200k for 60% Stake	—	—	—	—	Accepted Revised Offer
4	Matt Natonewski	"Nevermind Adventure"; A motorcycle touring and leather goods company	$1.33 million	Counter Offer $200k for 40% Stake	Revised Offer $200k for 49% Stake	—	—	—	—	Accepted Revised Offer

=== Episode 9 ===
#	Entrepreneur(s)	Idea	Business Valuation	Initial Offer	Sharks Offers					Final Deal
#	Entrepreneur(s)	Idea	Business Valuation	Initial Offer	Steve	Janine	Andrew	Naomi	Glen	Final Deal
1	Jayme & Jenny Park	"Franki + Seoul"; Natural skin care and beauty products and the latest trends and insights from Korea	$292,000	$35k for 12% Stake	—	—	—	—	—	No Offers
2	Elias Kassas and Elisa Trifunoski	"Just Jerky"; An authentic and all-natural beef jerky	$375,000	$75k for 20% Stake	$75k for 40% Stake	$75k for 37% Stake	—	$75k for 35% Stake	$75k for 35% Stake	Accepted Glen's Counter Offer
2	Elias Kassas and Elisa Trifunoski	"Just Jerky"; An authentic and all-natural beef jerky	$375,000	Counter Offer $75k for 33% Stake	Offer Rejected	Counter Offer $75k for 35% Stake	—	$75k for 35% Stake	Accepted Counter Offer $75k for 33% Stake	Accepted Glen's Counter Offer
3	Lauren & Lily Martin	"Wish U Were Here Dolls"; Handsewn cushioned dolls for children created with images of family members	$125,000	$25k for 20% Stake	$25k for 40% Stake	—	$25k for 40% Stake	—	—	Accepted Andrew's Offer
4	Roland Safar & Matej Varhalik	"Speedfit"; A 20 minute intense fitness session using EMS (Electronic Muscle Stimulation)	$2.8 million	$280k for 10% Stake	$280k for 40% Stake	$280k for 33% Stake	—	—	—	Rejected Offers
4	Roland Safar & Matej Varhalik	"Speedfit"; A 20 minute intense fitness session using EMS (Electronic Muscle Stimulation)	$2.8 million	Counter Offer $280k for 27.5% Stake	Revised Offer $280k for 31.1% Stake	$280k for 33% Stake	—	—	—	Rejected Offers
4	Roland Safar & Matej Varhalik	"Speedfit"; A 20 minute intense fitness session using EMS (Electronic Muscle Stimulation)	$2.8 million	Counter Offer $280k for 27.5% Stake	Offer Rejected	Offer Rejected	—	—	—	Rejected Offers

=== Episode 10 ===
#	Entrepreneur(s)	Idea	Business Valuation	Initial Offer	Sharks Offers					Final Deal
#	Entrepreneur(s)	Idea	Business Valuation	Initial Offer	Steve	Janine	Andrew	Naomi	Glen	Final Deal
1	Raph Freedman & Rory Boyden	"Peak Chocolate"; A pre-training, high performance chocolate	$500,000	$50k for 10% Stake	—	—	—	—	—	No Offers
2	Anthony & Rebecca Keain	"Cart-A-Lot"; A foldable cart	$1 million	$100k for 10% Stake	—	—	—	$100k for 45% Stake	—	Accepted Counter Offer
2	Anthony & Rebecca Keain	"Cart-A-Lot"; A foldable cart	$1 million	Counter Offer $100k for 40% Stake	—	—	—	Accepted Counter Offer $100k for 40% Stake	—	Accepted Counter Offer
3	Benjamin Seer	"Hummingbird"; Raw superfood blendies to add to your smoothie	$2 million	$200k for 10% Stake	—	—	—	$100k for 10% Stake + $100k Loan	—	Naomi Rejected Counter Offer
3	Benjamin Seer	"Hummingbird"; Raw superfood blendies to add to your smoothie	$2 million	Counter Offer $100k for 7% Stake + $100k Loan	—	—	—	Rejected Counter Offer	—	Naomi Rejected Counter Offer
4	Frank Lucisano & Tracy Richardson	"ScopeIT Education"; A company which delivers digital technology lessons to schools	$4.21 million	$632k for 15% Stake	$632k for 30% Stake	—	—	—	$632k for 39% Stake	Accepted Counter Offer
4	Frank Lucisano & Tracy Richardson	"ScopeIT Education"; A company which delivers digital technology lessons to schools	$4.21 million	Counter Offer $632k for 25% Stake	Accepted Counter Offer $632k for 25% Stake	—	—	—	$632k for 33% Stake	Accepted Counter Offer

=== Episode 11 ===
#	Entrepreneur(s)	Idea	Business Valuation	Initial Offer	Sharks Offers					Final Deal
#	Entrepreneur(s)	Idea	Business Valuation	Initial Offer	Steve	Janine	Andrew	Naomi	Glen	Final Deal
1	Ace Ahsan	"Your Flavour"; A range of handmade healthy seasoning products	$800,000	$80k for 10% Stake	—	—	—	$80k for 50% Stake	—	Accepted 2nd Counter Offer
1	Ace Ahsan	"Your Flavour"; A range of handmade healthy seasoning products	$800,000	Counter Offer $80k for 25% Stake; With money back in 2 years or converts to 35% Stake	—	—	—	$80k for 50% Stake	—	Accepted 2nd Counter Offer
1	Ace Ahsan	"Your Flavour"; A range of handmade healthy seasoning products	$800,000	2nd Counter Offer $80k for 40% Stake	—	—	—	$80k for 50% Stake	—	Accepted 2nd Counter Offer
2	Brent Thomas	"Lash U Lashes"; Professional eyelash extension training and high quality lash products	$1.2 million	$120k for 10% Stake; Plus $120k Loan	—	—	—	—	—	No Offers
3	Rodney Cross & Harry Bradford	"Squidezy"; Squid cleaning tool	$312,000	$100k for 32% Stake	—	—	—	—	—	No Offers
4	Melanie Newman & Cory Boyd	"Melanie Newman Salon Essentials"; Professional dog grooming products made out of plant-derived ingredients	$750,000	$150k for 20% Stake	—	Accepted Revised Offer $150k for 50% Stake; Split 15%	—	—	$150k for 50% Stake	Accepted Revised Offer
4	Melanie Newman & Cory Boyd	"Melanie Newman Salon Essentials"; Professional dog grooming products made out of plant-derived ingredients	$750,000	$150k for 20% Stake	—	Accepted Revised Offer $150k for 50% Stake; Split 15%	—	—	Accepted Revised Offer $150k for 50% Stake; Split 35%	Accepted Revised Offer

=== Episode 12 ===
#	Entrepreneur(s)	Idea	Business Valuation	Initial Offer	Sharks Offers					Final Deal
#	Entrepreneur(s)	Idea	Business Valuation	Initial Offer	Steve	Janine	Andrew	Naomi	Glen	Final Deal
1	Emma Head	"Sweet Mickie"; Personalised biscuit delivery	$1 million	$200k for 20% Stake	—	$200k for 49% Stake	$200k for 45% Stake	—	—	Accepted Counter Offer
1	Emma Head	"Sweet Mickie"; Personalised biscuit delivery	$1 million	Counter Offer $200k for 46% (Share equally)	—	Accepted Counter Offer $200k for 46% (Share equally)		—	—	Accepted Counter Offer
2	Andrew Leary	"Buckle Me Up"; An app enabled seatbelt reminder and alert for passenger cars that pairs with your smartphone via Bluetooth	$3.9 million	$390k for 10% Stake	$1.5 million for 100% Stake	—	—	—	—	Rejected Steve's Offer
2	Andrew Leary	"Buckle Me Up"; An app enabled seatbelt reminder and alert for passenger cars that pairs with your smartphone via Bluetooth	$3.9 million	Counter Offer $2 million for 100% Stake	Offer Rejected	—	—	—	—	Rejected Steve's Offer
3	Lisa Pagotto	"Crooked Compass"; A boutique tour operator, specialising in customised, small-group, and culturally immersive tours	$467,000	$70k for 15% Stake	—	—	—	Mentorship	—	No Offers
4	Anya Lorimer	"One Talk"; Talking posters operated by touch, that communicate with Aboriginal communities as well as non-English speaking new arrivals to Australia	$250,000	$50k for 20% Stake	—	—	—	$50k for 20% Stake	—	Accepted Offer

=== Episode 13 ===
#	Entrepreneur(s)	Idea	Business Valuation	Initial Offer	Sharks Offers					Final Deal
#	Entrepreneur(s)	Idea	Business Valuation	Initial Offer	Steve	Janine	Andrew	Naomi	Glen	Final Deal
1	Jaypee Abraham	"Jimalie Coconut Products"; A range of premium quality coconut products	$425,000	$85k for 20% Stake	—	—	—	—	$85k for 51% Stake	Accepted Counter Offer
1	Jaypee Abraham	"Jimalie Coconut Products"; A range of premium quality coconut products	$425,000	Counter Offer $85k for 40%	—	—	—	—	Accepted Counter Offer $85k for 45%	Accepted Counter Offer
2	Fergus Creese	"Find My Future"; Smart online tool for schools and career advisors helps to guide students and those looking to build a new future	$1.2 million	$300k for 25% Stake	—	—	—	—	—	No Offers
3	Rick & Tracy Coles	"Fresh Meals 2 U"; All-natural, nutrient-rich freshly prepared meal delivery	$1.5 million	$150k for 10% Stake	$200k for 25% Stake; Once $200k is repaid through royalties the Sharks' equity will reduce to a 10% Stake		—	—	—	Accepted Steve and Janine's Initial Offer
3	Rick & Tracy Coles	"Fresh Meals 2 U"; All-natural, nutrient-rich freshly prepared meal delivery	$1.5 million	Counter Offer $200k for 20%	$200k for 25% Stake; Once $200k is repaid through royalties the Sharks' equity will reduce to a 10% Stake		—	—	—	Accepted Steve and Janine's Initial Offer
4	Chris Anderson	"Ecto Hand Planes"; A bodysurfing hand plane that's made from recycled surfboards	$500,000	$100k for 20% Stake	—	—	—	$100k for 50% Stake	—	Accepted Offer

== Ratings ==
No.	Title	Air date	Timeslot	Overnight ratings		Ref(s)
No.	Title	Air date	Timeslot	Viewers	Rank	Ref(s)
1	Episode 1	20 June 2017	Tuesday 8.45pm	749,000	8	
2	Episode 2	27 June 2017	Tuesday 8.45pm	737,000	9	
3	Episode 3	4 July 2017	Tuesday 8.45pm	725,000	10	
4	Episode 4	11 July 2017	Tuesday 8.45pm	581,000	12	
5	Episode 5	18 July 2017	Tuesday 8.45pm	546,000	14	
6	Episode 6	1 August 2017	Tuesday 9.00pm	442,000	—N/a	
7	Episode 7	8 August 2017	Tuesday 7.30pm	477,000	17	
8	Episode 8	15 August 2017	Tuesday 7.30pm	464,000	18	
9	Episode 9	22 August 2017	Tuesday 7.30pm	461,000	19	
10	Episode 10	29 August 2017	Tuesday 7.30pm	458,000	17	
11	Episode 11	5 September 2017	Tuesday 7.30pm	394,000	20	
12	Episode 12	12 September 2017	Tuesday 7.30pm	470,000	17	
13	Episode 13	19 September 2017	Tuesday 9.00pm	389,000	—N/a	
