= Jane Lu =

Australian businesswoman (born 1986)

- Born: 12 June 1986 (age 40); China
- Education: University of New South Wales (BCom)
- Occupation: Businesswoman
- Known for: Founder of Showpo
- Television: Shark Tank

Jane Lu (born 12 June 1986) is an Australian businesswoman. Lu is the founder and chief executive officer of the fashion boutique Showpo. She was a "shark" on season five and six of the Australian version of Shark Tank on Network 10.

== Biography ==
Lu is the only child to Chinese-Australian parents. After leaving school, she completed an accounting cadetship with KPMG before working as an analyst for Ernst & Young. Following her friend's suggestion, she started a pop-up shop named Fat Boye Group with her in 2009. A year later, she would leave Ernst & Young, and a month later, her friend would inform Lu that she was leaving the start-up leading to Lu shutting down Fat Boye Group.

This led her to start her own e-retailing business where wholesalers supplied her with products on a consignment basis. Founded in 2010, the business was initially called Show Pony, but the name was changed to Showpo after it emerged that the name was owned by an American business. The business proved to be a success and has since increased in value each year.

Lu was named as the Cosmopolitan Entrepreneur of the Year in 2015. In 2016, she was listed in the Forbes Asia "30 under 30" list. She was listed in Smart Company's "Hot 30 under 30" list in both 2016 and 2017. In 2017, Lu was among the most viewed fashion professionals on LinkedIn. That same year, she debuted on The Australian Financial Review "Young Rich List".

In February 2023, Lu apologised after underestimating the interest of a Showpo warehouse sale after issues arose from a larger than expected attendance. There were complaints from customers about waiting in long queues in hot weather as well as the quality of the products. Lu admitted she had been initially concerned about an apparent lack of interest in the event after less than 400 people confirmed their attendance on the Facebook event page. After some disgruntled customers complained about the issues, Lu gave an assurance that the issues would be rectified at the next event, and said there would be more stock, more changing rooms, more EFTPOS machines and more staff.

In March 2023, Lu was one of five new "sharks" announced for a new series of Shark Tank Lu as well as Davie Fogarty, Sabri Suby and Catriona Wallace will succeed the previous cast of Janine Allis, Andrew Banks, Steve Baxter, Glen Richards and Naomi Simson when the program returns later in 2 Canadian "shark" Robert Herjavec will also be joining the Australian series.
