= Shark Tank (Australian TV series) season 5 =

Shark Tank
- Season 5
- Starring: Catriona Wallace; Robert Herjavec; Jane Lu; Sabri Suby; Davie Fogarty
- No. of episodes: 8

Release
- Original network: Network Ten
- Original release: 29 August 2023

Season chronology
- ← Previous; Season 4

The fifth season of Shark Tank aired on Network Ten from 29 August 2023 after a five-year hiatus. This season will have a new panel of investors.

In March 2023, it was announced the series would return to Network 10 later in the year, with a new panel of investors to be confirmed, and will be produced by Curio Pictures.

== Summary ==
The show features a panel of potential investors, named "Sharks", who listen to entrepreneurs pitch ideas for a business or product they wish to develop. These self-made multi-millionaires judge the business concepts and products pitched and then decide whether to invest their own money to help market and mentor each contestant.

== Episodes ==
=== Episode 1 ===
#	Entrepreneur(s)	Idea	Business Valuation	Initial Offer	Sharks Offers					Final Deal
#	Entrepreneur(s)	Idea	Business Valuation	Initial Offer	Sabri	Catriona	Davie	Jane	Robert	Final Deal

== Ratings ==
No.	Title	Air date	Timeslot	Overnight ratings		Consolidated ratings		Total viewers	Ref(s)
No.	Title	Air date	Timeslot	Viewers	Rank	Viewers	Rank	Total viewers	Ref(s)
1	Episode 1	29 August 2023	Tuesday 7.30pm	237,000	—N/a	—N/a	—N/a	237,000	
2	Episode 2	5 September 2023	Tuesday 7.30pm	262,000	18	—N/a	—N/a	262,000	
3	Episode 3	12 September 2023	Tuesday 7.30pm	261,000	19	—N/a	—N/a	261,000	
4	Episode 4	19 September 2023	Tuesday 7.30pm	223,000	—N/a	—N/a	—N/a	223,000	
5	Episode 5	26 September 2023	Tuesday 7.30pm	216,000	—N/a	—N/a	—N/a	216,000	
6	Episode 6	3 October 2023	Tuesday 7.30pm	279,000	18	—N/a	—N/a	279,000	
7	Episode 7	10 October 2023	Tuesday 7.30pm	227,000	20	—N/a	—N/a	227,000	
8	Episode 8	17 October 2023	Tuesday 7.30pm	239,000	20	—N/a	—N/a	239,000	
