= Shark Tank (Australian TV series) season 4 =

Shark Tank
- Season 4
- Starring: Steve Baxter; Janine Allis; Andrew Banks; Naomi Simson; Glen Richards
- No. of episodes: 13

Release
- Original network: Network Ten
- Original release: 15 May – 7 August 2018

Season chronology
- ← Previous; Season 3 Next → Season 5

The fourth season of Shark Tank aired on Network Ten from 15 May 2018. The series was confirmed following the opening of auditions in August 2017.

== Summary ==
The show features a panel of potential investors, named "Sharks", who listen to entrepreneurs pitch ideas for a business or product they wish to develop. These self-made multi-millionaires judge the business concepts and products pitched and then decide whether to invest their own money to help market and mentor each contestant.

== Investments by Shark ==
Shark	Offers Made	Deals Made	Total Investment
Steve	16	6	$696,000
Janine	13	5	$960,000
Andrew	11	8	$1,176,000
Naomi	10	6	$840,000
Glen	12	8	$1,273,000

== Episodes ==
=== Episode 1 ===
#	Entrepreneur(s)	Idea	Business Valuation	Initial Offer	Sharks Offers					Final Deal
#	Entrepreneur(s)	Idea	Business Valuation	Initial Offer	Steve	Janine	Andrew	Naomi	Glen	Final Deal
1	Jake Mckeon	"Coconut Bowls"; Bowls made from coconut	$3 million	$300k for 10% Stake	—	$300k for 28% Stake	$300k for 25% Stake	$300k for 18% Stake	$300k for 20% Stake	Accepted Janine and Andrew's Offer
1	Jake Mckeon	"Coconut Bowls"; Bowls made from coconut	$3 million	$300k for 10% Stake	—	Revised Offer $300k for 18% Stake	Revised Offer $300k for 20% Stake	$300k for 18% Stake	$300k for 20% Stake	Accepted Janine and Andrew's Offer
1	Jake Mckeon	"Coconut Bowls"; Bowls made from coconut	$3 million	$300k for 10% Stake	—	Accepted Joint Offer $300k for 18% Stake (Share)		Partnering for a Counter Offer		Accepted Janine and Andrew's Offer
2	Christen McGarry & Matt Hepburn	"Your Mates Brewery"; Brewery and restaurant features a range of craft beers	$3 million	$750k for 25% Stake	Asking for higher equity counter offer	—	—	—	Asking for higher equity counter offer	Steve and Glen Rejected Counter Offer
2	Christen McGarry & Matt Hepburn	"Your Mates Brewery"; Brewery and restaurant features a range of craft beers	$3 million	Counter Offer $750k for 40% Stake	Rejected Counter Offer	—	—	—	Rejected Counter Offer	Steve and Glen Rejected Counter Offer
3	Morgan Hipworth	"Bistro Morgan"; Artisan donut store	$1 million	$200k for 20% Stake	$200k for 30% Stake	$200k for 42% Stake	—	—	—	Janine Rejected Counter Offer
3	Morgan Hipworth	"Bistro Morgan"; Artisan donut store	$1 million	Counter Offer $200k for 20% Stake	Offer Rejected	Revised Offer $200k for 33% Stake	—	—	—	Janine Rejected Counter Offer
3	Morgan Hipworth	"Bistro Morgan"; Artisan donut store	$1 million	2nd Counter Offer $200k for 25% Stake	Offer Rejected	Rejected Counter Offer But Allow Mentorship	—	—	—	Janine Rejected Counter Offer
4	Lori Phegan	"The Inappropriate Gift Co."; Humorous gifts to people with an inappropriate sense of humor	$1 million	$100k for 10% Stake	$100k for 20% Stake	$100k for 18% Stake	$100k for 15% Stake	$100k for 15% Stake And Additional $100k for another 10% Stake if manage to deliver customers and doubling the size of business in 12 months	—	Accepted Naomi's Revised Offer
4	Lori Phegan	"The Inappropriate Gift Co."; Humorous gifts to people with an inappropriate sense of humor	$1 million	$100k for 10% Stake	Revised Offer $100k for 12.5% Stake	$100k for 18% Stake	$100k for 15% Stake	Accepted Revised Offer $250k for 25% Stake	$100k for 12.5% Stake	Accepted Naomi's Revised Offer

=== Episode 2 ===
#	Entrepreneur(s)	Idea	Business Valuation	Initial Offer	Sharks Offers					Final Deal
#	Entrepreneur(s)	Idea	Business Valuation	Initial Offer	Steve	Janine	Andrew	Naomi	Glen	Final Deal
1	Rose, Samantha & Kaisser Khater	"Dessert Boxes"; An online dessert gift-giving store	$3 million	$300k for 10% Stake	$300k for 10% Stake	$300k for 20% Stake	$300k for 25% Stake	$300k for 15% Stake	$300k for 15% Stake	Accepted Counter Offer
1	Rose, Samantha & Kaisser Khater	"Dessert Boxes"; An online dessert gift-giving store	$3 million	Counter Offer $300k for 12% Stake	$300k for 10% Stake	$300k for 20% Stake	$300k for 25% Stake	Accepted Counter Offer $300k for 12% Stake	$300k for 15% Stake	Accepted Counter Offer
2	Elissa Scott	"The T Lady"; Menopause tea, a herbal tea designed to help relieve symptoms of menopause	$200,000	$20k for 10% Stake	$20k for 30% Stake with $50k return in 2 years	$20k for 20% Stake	—	—	—	Accepted Janine's Offer
3	Sandra & Brendon Moffatt	"StandInBaby"; A newborn training mannequin	$1 million	$200k for 20% Stake	$200k for 20% Stake	$200k for 30% Stake	$200k for 25% Stake	—	$200k for 33% Stake	Accepted Joint Offer
3	Sandra & Brendon Moffatt	"StandInBaby"; A newborn training mannequin	$1 million	$200k for 20% Stake	$200k for 20% Stake	Rejected Offer	Accepted Joint Offer $200k for 20% Stake (Share with Glen)	—	Accepted Joint Offer $200k for 20% Stake (Share with Andrew)	Accepted Joint Offer
4	Stanley Hsu & Lestari Vickers	"My Cube"; A shared retail store with cubes that are mini shop fronts for micro-retailers charging out each cube space for $5 per day	$4 million	$200k for 5% Stake	$200k for 12.5% Stake	—	—	—	—	Accepted Offer

=== Episode 3 ===
#	Entrepreneur(s)	Idea	Business Valuation	Initial Offer	Sharks Offers					Final Deal
#	Entrepreneur(s)	Idea	Business Valuation	Initial Offer	Steve	Janine	Andrew	Naomi	Glen	Final Deal
1	Jack Zuvelek & James Buchanan	"The Body Consultants"; A personal training business	$2 million	$500k for 25% Stake	—	—	—	—	—	No Offers
2	Peter Boulton	"Rat Barrow"; Ride-on articulated tipping barrow	$800,000	$200k for 25% Stake	—	—	—	—	—	No Offers
3	Iris Smit	"The Quick Flick"; A pre-loaded stamp for creating a winged eyeliner look	$3 million	$300k for 10% Stake	—	$300k for 30% Stake	$300k for 30% Stake	—	—	Accepted 2nd Revised Offer
3	Iris Smit	"The Quick Flick"; A pre-loaded stamp for creating a winged eyeliner look	$3 million	Counter Offer $300k for 20% Stake	—	$300k for 30% Stake	Revised Offer $300k for 28% Stake	—	—	Accepted 2nd Revised Offer
3	Iris Smit	"The Quick Flick"; A pre-loaded stamp for creating a winged eyeliner look	$3 million	2nd Counter Offer $300k for 25% Stake	—	$300k for 30% Stake	Accepted 2nd Revised Offer $300k for 27.5% Stake	—	—	Accepted 2nd Revised Offer
4	Chris Ghaleb & Patrick Azzi	"Life Size Plans"; Business projects architectural plans onto the floor of a warehouse	$10 million	$2 million for 20% Stake	—	—	—	—	—	No Offers

=== Episode 4 ===
#	Entrepreneur(s)	Idea	Business Valuation	Initial Offer	Sharks Offers					Final Deal
#	Entrepreneur(s)	Idea	Business Valuation	Initial Offer	Steve	Janine	Andrew	Naomi	Glen	Final Deal
1	Chris Tabone	"Koda Sail"; A travel company that provides small group sailing tours in Croatia & Turkey for the Young Professional traveller aged 25–40.	$1.8 million	$180k for 10% Stake	$180k for 20% Stake	$180k for 30% Stake	—	$180k for 33% Stake	$180k for 20% Stake	Accepted 2nd Joint Offer
1	Chris Tabone	"Koda Sail"; A travel company that provides small group sailing tours in Croatia & Turkey for the Young Professional traveller aged 25–40.	$1.8 million	Counter Offer $180k for 20% Stake (Share)	Joint Offer $180k for 30% Stake (Share)		—	$180k for 33% Stake	Offer Withdrawn	Accepted 2nd Joint Offer
1	Chris Tabone	"Koda Sail"; A travel company that provides small group sailing tours in Croatia & Turkey for the Young Professional traveller aged 25–40.	$1.8 million	Counter Offer $180k for 20% Stake (Share)	Accepted 2nd Joint Offer $180k for 25% Stake (Share)		—	$180k for 33% Stake	Offer Withdrawn	Accepted 2nd Joint Offer
2	Rachel Dorig	"EarSox"; Ear protection against unwanted hair dye, water and chemicals	$1.4 million	$350k for 25% Stake	—	—	—	—	—	No Offers
3	Crag Carrick & Rachel Dutton	"Donugs"; A chicken nugget and donut combination	$500,000	$100k for 20% Stake	—	—	—	$100k for 25% Stake	—	Accepted Offer
4	Jack Corbett	"ISR Training"; A sales training and recruitment organisation	$625,000	$125k for 20% Stake	$125k for 20% Stake, no payment required	$125k and converted into 28% Stake after 16 months if returning all of the money	$125k for 20% Stake	—	$125k for 20% Stake	Accepted 2nd Counter Offer
4	Jack Corbett	"ISR Training"; A sales training and recruitment organisation	$625,000	Counter Offer $125k for 22.5% Stake (Share)	Revised Offer $125k for 18% Stake	Offer Withdrawn	$125k for 20% Stake	—	$125k for 20% Stake	Accepted 2nd Counter Offer
4	Jack Corbett	"ISR Training"; A sales training and recruitment organisation	$625,000	2nd Counter Offer $187k for 30% Stake (Share)	Accepted 2nd Counter Offer $187k for 30% Stake (Share with Andrew and Glen)	Offer Withdrawn	Accepted 2nd Counter Offer $187k for 30% Stake (Share with Steve and Glen)	—	Accepted 2nd Counter Offer $187k for 30% Stake (Share with Steve and Andrew)	Accepted 2nd Counter Offer

=== Episode 5 ===
#	Entrepreneur(s)	Idea	Business Valuation	Initial Offer	Sharks Offers					Final Deal
#	Entrepreneur(s)	Idea	Business Valuation	Initial Offer	Steve	Janine	Andrew	Naomi	Glen	Final Deal
1	Julie-Anne & Glen Mayer	"Subo"; Non-squeeze food bottle	$1 million	$120k for 12% Stake	$120k for 12% Stake	—	—	—	—	Accepted Offer
2	Nicole Mahler	"Delicious Foods Australia"; A healthy range of pre-packaged meals	$1 million	$100k for 10% Stake	$100k for 15% Stake	$100k for 25% Stake	$100k for 20% Stake	—	—	Accepted Janine's Offer
2	Nicole Mahler	"Delicious Foods Australia"; A healthy range of pre-packaged meals	$1 million	$100k for 10% Stake	Offer Rejected	$100k for 25% Stake	$100k for 20% Stake	—	—	Accepted Janine's Offer
3	John Whitehead & Bill Allardyce	"Double Chuck Drill"; A drill uses an electronic switch to disengage one chuck and flick the second chuck into position	$360,000	$90k for 25% Stake	—	—	Contact with DeWalt	—	—	No Offers

=== Episode 6 ===
#	Entrepreneur(s)	Idea	Business Valuation	Initial Offer	Sharks Offers					Final Deal
#	Entrepreneur(s)	Idea	Business Valuation	Initial Offer	Steve	Janine	Andrew	Naomi	Glen	Final Deal
1	Billie Whitehouse	"Wearable X"; Includes Nadi X – a woven-in technology to yoga pants with sensors that connect to an app which assists beginner to intermediate yogis to practice at home	$10 million	$1.8 million for 18% Stake	—	—	—	—	—	No Offers
2	Arno Backes	"Ganache Chocolate"'; Handmade, small-batch range of chocolate and pantry products	$1.5 million	$600k for 40% Stake	—	$600k for 40% Stake under 3 conditions: meeting with Arno's partner, the cost of goods down to 33%, and the wages have to be a maximum of 30%.	—	—	—	Accepted Offer
3	Liana Wynne	"The Clothesline Brolley"; A cover for clotheslines out of clear PVC	$305,000	$122k for 20% Stake	—	—	—	—	—	No Offers
4	Dave Nelson & Marko Pavasovic	"Vodka +"; A healthy alternative to alcohol	$2.5 million	$250k for 10% Stake	$250k for 40% Stake, increasing 10% Stake if not paying enough money	—	—	—	—	Rejecting Steve's Offer

=== Episode 7 ===
#	Entrepreneur(s)	Idea	Business Valuation	Initial Offer	Sharks Offers					Final Deal
#	Entrepreneur(s)	Idea	Business Valuation	Initial Offer	Steve	Janine	Andrew	Naomi	Glen	Final Deal
1	Jonny Shannon & Tony Walden	"Gamify"; Branded, personalised video games for companies	$2 million	$200k for 10% Stake	—	$200k for 25% Stake	—	Mentorship	—	Rejected Janine's Counter Offer
1	Jonny Shannon & Tony Walden	"Gamify"; Branded, personalised video games for companies	$2 million	Counter Offer $200k for 20% Stake	—	Counter Offer Rejected	—	Mentorship	—	Rejected Janine's Counter Offer
2	Tanya Wood	"Sunburst Outdoor Living"; Outdoor cushion designs	$200,000	$40k for 20% Stake	—	—	—	$40k for 30% Stake	—	Accepted Offer
3	Harrison Lingard	"Refresh Mobile Car Detailing"; An on-demand, car detailing service	$2 million	$400k for 20% Stake	—	—	—	—	—	No Offers
4	Sam & Hannah Priestly	"The Bosscoop"; A workout supplements scoop	$100,000	$25k for 25% Stake	—	—	—	—	—	Accepted Joint Offer
4	Sam & Hannah Priestly	"The Bosscoop"; A workout supplements scoop	$100,000	$25k for 25% Stake	Joint Offer $25k for 40% Stake (Share with Andrew)	—	Joint Offer $25k for 40% Stake (Share with Steve)	—	—	Accepted Joint Offer

=== Episode 8 ===
#	Entrepreneur(s)	Idea	Business Valuation	Initial Offer	Sharks Offers					Final Deal
#	Entrepreneur(s)	Idea	Business Valuation	Initial Offer	Steve	Janine	Andrew	Naomi	Glen	Final Deal
1	Laynton Allan & Adrian Rokman	"KidsCo."; A school holiday childcare program	$2.5 million	$375k for 15% Stake	—	—	—	—	$375k for 33.3333% Stake	Accepted 2nd Counter Offer
1	Laynton Allan & Adrian Rokman	"KidsCo."; A school holiday childcare program	$2.5 million	Counter Offer $375k for 25% Stake, increasing 5% Stake if not paying enough money in 2021, and two free programs for Richards’ current corporate businesses	—	—	—	—	Revised Offer $25k for 30% Stake	Accepted 2nd Counter Offer
1	Laynton Allan & Adrian Rokman	"KidsCo."; A school holiday childcare program	$2.5 million	2nd Counter Offer $300k with a $75k Line of Credit for 25% Stake, and two free programs for Richards’ current corporate businesses	—	—	—	—	Revised Offer $25k for 30% Stake	Accepted 2nd Counter Offer
2	Heidi Loy	"Ice Bucket Skins"'; A stubby holder for an ice bucket	$2.6 million	$260k for 10% Stake	—	—	—	—	—	No Offers
3	Jordan McGregor	"Bare + Boho"; Reusable, eco-friendly products for mothers and babies	$283,000	$85k for 30% Stake	—	—	—	—	$30k for 30% Stake with a Working Line of Credit of $55k	Accepted Offer
4	Jon Stul & Rafael Niesten	"Bricks + Agent"; A business that allows consumers and businesses to be matched with qualified tradespeople	$2.5 million	$250k for 10% Stake	—	—	$250k for 20% Stake	$250k for 20% Stake	—	Accepted Revised Offer
4	Jon Stul & Rafael Niesten	"Bricks + Agent"; A business that allows consumers and businesses to be matched with qualified tradespeople	$2.5 million	Counter Offer $250k for 15% Stake	—	—	Accepted Revised Offer $250k for 16% Stake	$250k for 20% Stake	—	Accepted Revised Offer

=== Episode 9 ===
#	Entrepreneur(s)	Idea	Business Valuation	Initial Offer	Sharks Offers					Final Deal
#	Entrepreneur(s)	Idea	Business Valuation	Initial Offer	Steve	Janine	Andrew	Naomi	Glen	Final Deal
1	Nicole & Steve Jones	"Flu Away 48"; An all-natural cold and flu medication	$7.5 million	$1.5 million for 20% Stake	—	—	—	—	—	No Offers
2	Michael & Georgie Gettings	"Michael & George"'; Lamp shaped like a pencil	$600,000	$90k for 15% Stake	—	—	—	—	—	No Offers
3	Peita Pini	"The Swag"; A fridge bag that holds moisture to prevent fruit and vegetables from going off	$3 million	$300k for 10% Stake	—	$100k for 25% Stake, and $200k Loan repaid by virtue of 5% of gross sale each year	—	—	$150k for 25% Stake	Accepted Glen's Offer
4	James Willis	"The Mason Baker"; Handmade jarcakes	$333,000	$50k for 15% Stake	—	—	$50k for 20% Stake	$100k for 40% Stake (Share with Andrew)	—	Accepted Joint Offer
4	James Willis	"The Mason Baker"; Handmade jarcakes	$333,000	Counter Offer $50k for 20% Stake (Share equally)	—	—	$50k for 20% Stake	$100k for 40% Stake (Share with Andrew)	—	Accepted Joint Offer
4	James Willis	"The Mason Baker"; Handmade jarcakes	$333,000	2nd Counter Offer $100k for 30% Stake (Share equally)	—	—	Accepted Joint Offer $100k for 30% Stake (Share)		—	Accepted Joint Offer

=== Episode 10 ===
#	Entrepreneur(s)	Idea	Business Valuation	Initial Offer	Sharks Offers					Final Deal
#	Entrepreneur(s)	Idea	Business Valuation	Initial Offer	Steve	Janine	Andrew	Naomi	Glen	Final Deal
1	Daniel, Lochie, Sam & Jack	"Jar Education"; A program that teaches school kids classes in digital technologies, including a build-to-fly drone kit	$5 million	$250k for 5% Stake	—	—	—	—	—	No Offers
2	Irina Zikner & Lilly Stesin	"iLoveEarth"'; Collapsible, resuseable coffee cups	$367,000	$110k for 30% Stake	—	—	—	—	—	No Offers
3	Caroline Africh	"Things 4 Bubs"; A wholesaling distribution business where stay-at-home mothers buy baby goods at wholesale prices	$1 million	$250k for 25% Stake	$250k for 20% Stake with a three-times payback within three years, at which point he would fall to a 5% equity stake	—	$250k for 30% Stake	$250k for 30% Stake	—	Accepted Andrew's Offer
4	Hugh Campbell	"Snap Social"; An interactive display in retail stores	$500,000	$100k for 20% Stake	—	—	—	$100k for 45% Stake	—	Accepted Counter Offer
4	Hugh Campbell	"Snap Social"; An interactive display in retail stores	$500,000	Counter Offer $100k for 33% Stake	—	—	—	$100k for 45% Stake	—	Accepted Counter Offer

=== Episode 11 ===
#	Entrepreneur(s)	Idea	Business Valuation	Initial Offer	Sharks Offers					Final Deal
#	Entrepreneur(s)	Idea	Business Valuation	Initial Offer	Steve	Janine	Andrew	Naomi	Glen	Final Deal
1	Ed O’Donoghue	"FroPro"; A 96% sugar-free high-protein ice cream brand	$2.5 million	$250k for 10% Stake	$250k for 20% Stake	—	—	—	$250k for 20% Stake	Accepted Glen's Initial Offer
1	Ed O’Donoghue	"FroPro"; A 96% sugar-free high-protein ice cream brand	$2.5 million	Counter Offer $250k for 20% Stake including a clause that would let O’Donoghue buy back 10% equity in the business within 12 months	Revised Offer $250k for 20% Stake including a clause that would let O’Donoghue buy back 10% equity in the business for around $300k	—	—	—	$250k for 20% Stake	Accepted Glen's Initial Offer
2	Mick Ryan	"Mickey Blu Australia"'; Portable generators for caravans and campers	$5 million	$2.5 million for 50% Stake	—	—	—	—	—	No Offers
3	Daniel Franco, Jeremy Hurst & Daniel McCullen	"SpacetoCo"; An Airbnb-style business that matches people with function spaces available for short-term hire	$1.5 million	$210k for 14% Stake	$210k for 21% Stake plus a setting aside of 10% allocation to a tech cofounder	—	—	—	—	Accepted Counter Offer
3	Daniel Franco, Jeremy Hurst & Daniel McCullen	"SpacetoCo"; An Airbnb-style business that matches people with function spaces available for short-term hire	$1.5 million	Counter Offer $210k for 20% Stake plus a setting aside of 10% allocation to a tech cofounder	$210k for 21% Stake plus a setting aside of 10% allocation to a tech cofounder	—	—	—	—	Accepted Counter Offer
4	Annie Vine & Janet Cocks	"HTZ Hot Teaze"; A hairdressing tool which adds body and volume to the hair	$10 million	$500k for 5% Stake	—	—	—	—	—	No Offers

=== Episode 12 ===
#	Entrepreneur(s)	Idea	Business Valuation	Initial Offer	Sharks Offers					Final Deal
#	Entrepreneur(s)	Idea	Business Valuation	Initial Offer	Steve	Janine	Andrew	Naomi	Glen	Final Deal
1	Diana Scott	"Frontier Pets"; A range of organic freeze-dried dog food	$2.643 million	$608k for 23% Stake	—	—	—	—	—	No Offers
2	Gabrielle Requena	"Wrinkles Schminkles"; A range of silicon patches that women can wear overnight	$1.73 million	$300k for 17% Stake	—	—	—	—	—	No Offers
3	Damian Joyce	"Hex Pegs"; A multi-purpose caravan and camping peg that are drilled into and out of the ground using any type of drill or impact driver	$400,000	$80k for 20% Stake	$80k for 20% Stake, with a return of $1 per peg until a total of $160k returned which reducing to 5% Stake	—	—	—	$80k for 40% Stake	Accepted Glen's Offer
4	Lorraine Cherry-Nguyen & Stacey Fisher	"Minnow Designs"; Protective beach shoes for kids	$350,000	$70k for 20% Stake	—	—	—	Mentorship	—	No Offers

=== Episode 13 ===
#	Entrepreneur(s)	Idea	Business Valuation	Initial Offer	Sharks Offers					Final Deal
#	Entrepreneur(s)	Idea	Business Valuation	Initial Offer	Steve	Janine	Andrew	Naomi	Glen	Final Deal
1	Edwina Sharrock	"Birth Beat"; Online birth education site	$2 million	$200k for 10% Stake	—	$100k for 20% Stake + $100k Loan	—	—	—	Accepted Offer
2	Jai Felinski & Ben Goodman	"Pod & Parcel"; Environmentally friendly coffee pods	$667,000	$100k for 15% Stake	—	—	—	$100k for 30% Stake	$100k for 30% Stake	Accepted Naomi's Initial Offer
2	Jai Felinski & Ben Goodman	"Pod & Parcel"; Environmentally friendly coffee pods	$667,000	Counter Offer $100k for 25% Stake	—	—	—	$100k for 30% Stake	$100k for 30% Stake	Accepted Naomi's Initial Offer
3	Phoebe Colbrelli-Cox & Charity Turner	"The Seek Society"; Earth conscious camping and outdoor canvas tents	$667,000	$200k for 30% Stake	—	—	—	—	—	No Offers
4	Andrew Clapham, Moe Satti, & Zakaria Bouguettaya	"QPay"; Student marketplace and payments app	$4.5 million	$380k for 8.4% Stake	$380k for 8.4% Stake	—	—	$380k for 8.4% Stake	—	Accepted Joint Offer
4	Andrew Clapham, Moe Satti, & Zakaria Bouguettaya	"QPay"; Student marketplace and payments app	$4.5 million	$380k for 8.4% Stake	Accepted Joint Offer $190k for 4.2% Stake (Combine with Naomi)	—	—	Accepted Joint Offer $190k for 4.2% Stake (Combine with Steve)	—	Accepted Joint Offer

== Ratings ==
No.	Title	Air date	Timeslot	Overnight ratings		Consolidated ratings		Total viewers	Ref(s)
No.	Title	Air date	Timeslot	Viewers	Rank	Viewers	Rank	Total viewers	Ref(s)
1	Episode 1	15 May 2018	Tuesday 8.45pm	508,000	14	56,000	13	562,000	
2	Episode 2	22 May 2018	Tuesday 8.45pm	622,000	11	51,000	10	673,000	
3	Episode 3	29 May 2018	Tuesday 8.45pm	571,000	16	57,000	15	624,000	
4	Episode 4	5 June 2018	Tuesday 8.45pm	560,000	15	49,000	13	609,000	
5	Episode 5	12 June 2018	Tuesday 8.45pm	614,000	11	56,000	12	670,000	
6	Episode 6	19 June 2018	Tuesday 8.45pm	567,000	12	56,000	12	623,000	
7	Episode 7	26 June 2018	Tuesday 8.45pm	610,000	13	47,000	11	658,000	
8	Episode 8	3 July 2018	Tuesday 8.45pm	515,000	14	56,000	13	571,000	
9	Episode 9	10 July 2018	Tuesday 8.45pm	486,000	15	48,000	17	534,000	
10	Episode 10	17 July 2018	Tuesday 8.45pm	480,000	17	55,000	14	534,000	
11	Episode 11	24 July 2018	Tuesday 8.45pm	446,000	16	53,000	15	499,000	
12	Episode 12	31 July 2018	Tuesday 9.50pm	440,000	19	—N/a	—N/a	440,000	
13	Episode 13	7 August 2018	Tuesday 9.00pm	371,000	21	—N/a	—N/a	371,000	
