= Shark Tank (Australian TV series) season 2 =

Shark Tank
- Season 2
- Starring: Steve Baxter; Janine Allis; Andrew Banks; Naomi Simson; Glen Richards
- No. of episodes: 13

Release
- Original network: Network Ten
- Original release: 8 May – 7 July 2016

Season chronology
- ← Previous; Season 1 Next → Season 3

The second season of Shark Tank aired on Network Ten on 8 May 2016 and concluded 7 July 2016. The series was confirmed on 9 June 2015.

== Summary ==
The show features a panel of potential investors, named "Sharks", who listen to entrepreneurs pitch ideas for a business or product they wish to develop. These self-made multi-millionaires judge the business concepts and products pitched and then decide whether to invest their own money to help market and mentor each contestant.

== Investments by Shark ==
Shark	Offers Made	Deals Made	Total Investment
Janine	17	11	$2,325,000 + Beer
Glen	17	13	$1,676,666 + Beer
Steve	18	13	$1,326,666 + Beer
Naomi	16	10	$1,110,000 + Beer
Andrew	16	10	$851,666 + Beer

== Episodes ==
=== Episode 1 ===
#	Entrepreneur(s)	Idea	Business Valuation	Initial Offer	Sharks Offers					Final Deal
#	Entrepreneur(s)	Idea	Business Valuation	Initial Offer	Steve	Janine	Andrew	Naomi	Glen	Final Deal
1	Mick Spencer	"On The Go Sports"; Custom sports apparel e-commerce	$3 million	$300k for 10% Stake	$300k for 20% Stake	$300k for 20% Stake	$300k for 20% Stake	—	—	Accepted 2nd Revised Counter Offer
1	Mick Spencer	"On The Go Sports"; Custom sports apparel e-commerce	$3 million	Counter Offer $300k for 15% Stake (Share)	Revised Counter Offer; 600k for 35% (Share)			—	—	Accepted 2nd Revised Counter Offer
1	Mick Spencer	"On The Go Sports"; Custom sports apparel e-commerce	$3 million	2nd Revised Counter Offer; 600k for 30% (Share)	Accepted 2nd Revised Counter Offer; 600k for 30% (Share)			—	—	Accepted 2nd Revised Counter Offer
2	David Lambasa	"Clever Score"; Design and manufacturing company for manual scoreboards	$800,000	$200k for 25% Stake	—	—	—	—	$200k for 50% Stake of Entire Business	Rejected Glen's Offer
2	David Lambasa	"Clever Score"; Design and manufacturing company for manual scoreboards	$800,000	Counter Offer $200k for 33% Stake	—	—	—	—	Revised Counter Offer $200k for 50% Stake + $75k Salary for David	Rejected Glen's Offer
3	Lynton V Harris	"Sharknado Alive"; Live interactive attraction based on the Sharknado brand	$950,000	$475k for 50% Stake	$475k for 50% Stake (Share)					Accepted Offer

=== Episode 2 ===
#	Entrepreneur(s)	Idea	Business Valuation	Initial Offer	Sharks Offers					Final Deal
#	Entrepreneur(s)	Idea	Business Valuation	Initial Offer	Steve	Janine	Andrew	Naomi	Glen	Final Deal
1	Gary Elphick	"Disrupt"; Self customiseable designs for world's sports equipments	$4.3 million	$250k for 5.8% Stake	—	—	—	—	$250k for 33% Stake	Rejected Glen's Offer
2	Will Davies & Dave Trumbull	"Car Next Door"; Peer-to-peer car rental, a system which people rent privately owned vehicles on an hourly or daily basis to other registered users	$7.5 million	$300k for 4% Stake	$300k for 4% Stake	—	—	—	—	Accepted Offer
3	Shath & Bren	"Super Orbs"; Bite sized vegan snack meal made with organic super-foods	$1 million	$200k for 20% Stake	—	—	—	—	—	No Offers
4	Kath Purkis	"Her Fashion Box (HFB)"; A box full of beauty accessories and products based on a buyers look and personality	$1.6 million	$200k for 12% Stake	—	$200k for 20% Stake (Shared with Andrew)	$200k for 15% Stake	—	—	Accepted Counter Offer
4	Kath Purkis	"Her Fashion Box (HFB)"; A box full of beauty accessories and products based on a buyers look and personality	$1.6 million	Counter Offer $200k for 16% Stake (2 Sharks)	—	Accepted Counter Offer $200k for 16% Stake		—	—	Accepted Counter Offer

=== Episode 3 ===
#	Entrepreneur(s)	Idea	Business Valuation	Initial Offer	Sharks Offers					Final Deal
#	Entrepreneur(s)	Idea	Business Valuation	Initial Offer	Steve	Janine	Andrew	Naomi	Glen	Final Deal
1	Mick D	"Tag International"; An outdoor adventure and team-building company	$500,000	$100k for 20% Stake	$100k for 35% Stake (Shared)	—	$100k for 35% Stake (Single offer)	$100k for 25% Stake	—	Accepted Counter Offer
1	Mick D	"Tag International"; An outdoor adventure and team-building company	$500,000	Counter Offer $100k for 30% Stake (Steve & Andrew)	$100k for 35% Stake (Shared)	—	$100k for 35% Stake (Shared)	$100k for 25% Stake	—	Accepted Counter Offer
1	Mick D	"Tag International"; An outdoor adventure and team-building company	$500,000	Counter Offer $100k for 30% Stake (Steve & Andrew)	Accepted Counter Offer $100k for 30% Stake (Shared)	—	Accepted Counter Offer $100k for 30% Stake (Shared)	$100k for 25% Stake	—	Accepted Counter Offer
2	Sally Matterson	"Extreme Shredder"; Online fitness company that gives you access to online fitness workouts	$250,000	$50k for 20% Stake	$50k Loan	—	—	$50k for 25% Stake	—	Accepted Naomi's Offer
3	Richard Ploszaj	"Troppo Bicycle"; Redesigned Bicycle that goes faster, offers better exercise and body building benefits, enhanced comfort and safety	$10.2 million	$5 million for 49% Stake	—	—	—	—	—	No Offers
4	Michael Timbs	"Betswaps.com"; An online sports tipping marketplace	$2 million	$200k for 10% Stake	$200k for 15% Stake	—	$200k for 30% Stake	$200k for 20% Stake	$200k for 15% Stake	Accepted Counter Offer
4	Michael Timbs	"Betswaps.com"; An online sports tipping marketplace	$2 million	Counter Offer $200k for 15% Stake (Steve & Glen)	Accepted Counter Offer $200k for 15% Stake (Shared)	—	$200k for 30% Stake	$200k for 20% Stake	Accepted Counter Offer $200k for 15% Stake (Shared)	Accepted Counter Offer

=== Episode 4 ===
#	Entrepreneur(s)	Idea	Business Valuation	Initial Offer	Sharks Offers					Final Deal
#	Entrepreneur(s)	Idea	Business Valuation	Initial Offer	Steve	Janine	Andrew	Naomi	Glen	Final Deal
1	Marc Berryman	"Rhinohide"; A tough, removable body armour that protects 4x4 cars against dents and scratches	$800,000	$80k for 10% Stake	$80k for 35% Stake	—	$80k for 20% Stake + $40k Loan	—	$80k for 10% Stake	Accepted Revised Offer
1	Marc Berryman	"Rhinohide"; A tough, removable body armour that protects 4x4 cars against dents and scratches	$800,000	Counter Offer $80k for 10% Stake each (Andrew & Glen)	Revised Offer $80k for 10% Stake	—		—	$80k for 10% Stake	Accepted Revised Offer
1	Marc Berryman	"Rhinohide"; A tough, removable body armour that protects 4x4 cars against dents and scratches	$800,000	Counter Offer $80k for 10% Stake each (Andrew & Glen)	Revised Offer $80k for 10% Stake	—	Accepted Revised Offer $80k for 10% Stake (Share)	—	Accepted Revised Offer $80k for 10% Stake (Share)	Accepted Revised Offer
2	Perry Ormsby	"Ormsby Guitars"; Handmade guitars from very rare timbers	$2 million	$200k for 10% Stake	—	$200k Loan for 10% Stake, Repayable at 10% Interest	—	—	—	Rejected Steve's Offer
2	Perry Ormsby	"Ormsby Guitars"; Handmade guitars from very rare timbers	$2 million	Counter Offer $200k Loan for 10% Stake. Dropping to 5% when Loan is repaid.	$200k Loan for 10% Stake, Repayable at 10% Interest	$200k Loan for 10% Stake, Repayable at 10% Interest	—	—	—	Rejected Steve's Offer
2	Perry Ormsby	"Ormsby Guitars"; Handmade guitars from very rare timbers	$2 million	Counter Offer $200k Loan for 10% Stake. Dropping to 5% when Loan is repaid.	Offer Rejected	Rejected Counter Offer	—	—	—	Rejected Steve's Offer
3	Steve Johnson & Christian Shaefer	"Carhood"; Airport car sharing platform while they are travelling.	$4.545 million	$500k for 11% Stake	—	—	—	—	—	No Offers
4	Matt Gillett	"2Shu"; A shoe that can be converted between a thong or a closed-toe shoe and vice versa	$375,000	150k for 40% Stake	—	$150k for 25% Stake in Matt's entire business	—	—	—	Accepted Offer

=== Episode 5 ===
#	Entrepreneur(s)	Idea	Business Valuation	Initial Offer	Sharks Offers					Final Deal
#	Entrepreneur(s)	Idea	Business Valuation	Initial Offer	Steve	Janine	Andrew	Naomi	Glen	Final Deal
1	Marlies & Jai Hobbs	"Paleo Café"; Health food store and cafe franchise	$7.5 million	$750k for 10% Stake	—	$750k for 38% Stake	—	—	—	Accepted Janine's Initial Offer
1	Marlies & Jai Hobbs	"Paleo Café"; Health food store and cafe franchise	$7.5 million	Counter Offer $750k for 25% Stake	—	$750k for 38% Stake	—	—	—	Accepted Janine's Initial Offer
2	Michelle & Troy Tornabene	"Pitzstop"; Disposable male armpit guards	$200,000	$50k for 25% Stake	—	—	—	—	—	No Offers
3	Anna Walsh	"Body Peace Clothing"; A range of eco-friendly clothes from bamboo	$600,000	$90k for a 15% Stake	$90k for a 25% Stake	$90k for a 20% Stake	—	—	—	Accepted Revised Counter Offer
3	Anna Walsh	"Body Peace Clothing"; A range of eco-friendly clothes from bamboo	$600,000	$90k for a 15% Stake	Revised Offer $90k for 15% Stake	$90k for a 20% Stake	—	—	—	Accepted Revised Counter Offer
3	Anna Walsh	"Body Peace Clothing"; A range of eco-friendly clothes from bamboo	$600,000	$90k for a 15% Stake	Accepted Revised Counter Offer $180k for 30% Stake (Share)		—	—	—	Accepted Revised Counter Offer
4	Keegan, Matt, Nick & Lee	"Friday Beers"; A subscription of cold craft beers delivery service every Friday	$250,000	$25k for 10% Stake	$25k for 10% Stake	—	—	—	—	Accepted Offer

=== Episode 6 ===
#	Entrepreneur(s)	Idea	Business Valuation	Initial Offer	Sharks Offers					Final Deal
#	Entrepreneur(s)	Idea	Business Valuation	Initial Offer	Steve	Janine	Andrew	Naomi	Glen	Final Deal
1	Bernie Sharrad	"Cap Hat"; A detachable cover for a cap or hat that provides full sun protection	$480,000	$120k for 25% Stake	$120k Loan for 10% p.a. No equity (Share with Andrew)	—	$120k Loan (Share with Steve) and a future option to take a 15% equity stake in the business.	Connect Bernie with two retail giants	—	Accepted Offer
2	Dylan Samra & Daniel Cunningham	"ASAP Delivery"; An SMS-based on-demand service	$1.6 million	$160k for 10% Stake	—	—	—	—	—	No Offers
3	Julia Sakr	"Potty Plant"; A real grass dog toilet per subscription	$700,000	$70k for 10% Stake	—	—	—	—	$70k for 30% Stake	Accepted Revised Counter Offer
3	Julia Sakr	"Potty Plant"; A real grass dog toilet per subscription	$700,000	Counter Offer $70k for 20% Stake	—	—	—	—	Accepted Revised Counter Offer $70k for 25% Stake	Accepted Revised Counter Offer
4	Fred Keizer	"Automated Flaggers"; A signaling system that takes traffic signalers out of harms way.	—	Launch the invention for a carton of beer	Offer to make some calls for 5 cartons of beer (Each)					Accepted Offer

=== Episode 7 ===
#	Entrepreneur(s)	Idea	Business Valuation	Initial Offer	Sharks Offers					Final Deal
#	Entrepreneur(s)	Idea	Business Valuation	Initial Offer	Steve	Janine	Andrew	Naomi	Glen	Final Deal
1	Briella Brown	"Your Closet"; A luxury dress rental service	$400,000	$80k for 20% Stake	—	$80k for 30% Stake (Share with Steve)	—	$80k for 40% Stake	—	Accepted Joint Offer
1	Briella Brown	"Your Closet"; A luxury dress rental service	$400,000	Counter Offer $80k for 30% Stake (Naomi & Janine)	—	Joint Offer $80k for 40% Stake (Share with Naomi)	—	Joint Offer $80k for 40% Stake (Share with Janine)	—	Accepted Joint Offer
2	Guy & Pepe Marshall	"Super Food Sushi"; Vegan sushi cafe	$1.136 million	$250k for 22% Stake	—	—	—	—	—	No Offers
3	Adam Countts	"Red Burlesque"; A range of red lipsticks	$500,000	$150k for 30% Stake	—	—	—	—	—	No Offers
4	Demitrias & Utah Rejtano	"2WHEELBoard"; A combination of skateboarding and snowboarding	$500,000	$100k for 20% Stake	—	—	—	$100k Loan	—	Accepted Offer

=== Episode 8 ===
#	Entrepreneur(s)	Idea	Business Valuation	Initial Offer	Sharks Offers					Final Deal
#	Entrepreneur(s)	Idea	Business Valuation	Initial Offer	Steve	Janine	Andrew	Naomi	Glen	Final Deal
1	Liz Kaelin	"You Chews"; An online marketplace for workplace catering	$2.5 million	$125k for 5% Stake	$125k for 12.5% Stake	—	—	—	—	Accepted Steve's Initial Offer
1	Liz Kaelin	"You Chews"; An online marketplace for workplace catering	$2.5 million	Counter Offer $125k for 9% Stake	$125k for 12.5% Stake	—	—	—	—	Accepted Steve's Initial Offer
2	Isabella Dymalovski	"Luv Ur Self"; A skincare range for young teenage girls	$325,000	$65k for 20% Stake	—	—	—	—	—	No Offers
3	David Lovato	"Crowd Property Capital"; An innovative peer-to-peer platform that allows investors to lend funds to borrowers	$400,000	$80k for 20% Stake	—	—	—	—	—	No Offers
4	Joshua Young	"auug" A mobile app and hardware product that allows you to play musical instruments	$1 million	$50k for 5% Stake	—	—	$50k for 10% Stake	$50k for 7.5% Stake	—	Accepted Andrew's Offer
4	Joshua Young	"auug" A mobile app and hardware product that allows you to play musical instruments	$1 million	$50k for 5% Stake	—	—	$100k for 20% Stake (Share)		—	Accepted Andrew's Offer

=== Episode 9 ===
#	Entrepreneur(s)	Idea	Business Valuation	Initial Offer	Sharks Offers					Final Deal
#	Entrepreneur(s)	Idea	Business Valuation	Initial Offer	Steve	Janine	Andrew	Naomi	Glen	Final Deal
1	Jen Lawrence & John Bennett	"newagestore.com" A spiritual and guidance website	$1 million	$100k for 10% Stake	—	—	—	$100k for 20% Stake	—	Accepted Offer
2	Roberto Durso	"Exfolimate"; An exfoliating tool to clean away dead skin from the body	$2.2 million	$1.1m for 50% Stake	—	—	—	—	—	No Offers
3	Lee Holmes	"Supercharged Food"; Online website which offers anti-inflammatory recipes for improved health	$1 million	$200k for 20% Stake	—	$100k for 35% Stake + $100k Loan	—	$200k for 50% Stake	—	Accepted Janine's Offer
4	Andy Mehringer	"New Eye Company"; Workplace safety glasses that support prescription lenses through foil inserts	$750,000	$150k for 20% Stake	$150k for 25% Stake	—	$150k for 30% Stake	—	$150k for 30% Stake	Accepted Offer
4	Andy Mehringer	"New Eye Company"; Workplace safety glasses that support prescription lenses through foil inserts	$750,000	$150k for 20% Stake	$150k for 30% Stake (Share)	—	$150k for 30% Stake (Share)	—	$150k for 30% Stake (Share)	Accepted Offer

=== Episode 10 ===
#	Entrepreneur(s)	Idea	Business Valuation	Initial Offer	Sharks Offers					Final Deal
#	Entrepreneur(s)	Idea	Business Valuation	Initial Offer	Steve	Janine	Andrew	Naomi	Glen	Final Deal
1	Omid Rad	"Intelliweed"; An environmentally friendly weeding tool that pierces the weed and releases a herbicide.	$2.3 million	$175k for 7.5% Stake	$175k for 33.3% Stake	—	$175k for 30% Stake	—	$175k for 15% Stake	Accepted Glen's Offer
1	Omid Rad	"Intelliweed"; An environmentally friendly weeding tool that pierces the weed and releases a herbicide.	$2.3 million	$175k for 7.5% Stake	$175k for 25% Stake	—	$175k for 30% Stake	—	$175k for 15% Stake	Accepted Glen's Offer
2	Oran Harel	"HairLuxe"; A product which eliminates the look of balding or thinning hair	$250,000	$50k for 20% Stake	—	—	—	—	—	No Offers
3	Maria Nicola	"10-Way Necklace"; A necklace that can be worn ten different ways	$375,000	$75k for 20% Stake	—	$75k for 40% Stake	—	$75k for 40% Stake	—	Accepted Naomi's Initial Offer
3	Maria Nicola	"10-Way Necklace"; A necklace that can be worn ten different ways	$375,000	Counter Offer $75k for 30% Stake	—	$75k for 40% Stake	—	$75k for 40% Stake	—	Accepted Naomi's Initial Offer
4	Sam Begg	"Hit With Me"; An app that helps individuals find someone to play tennis with	$250,000	$50k for 20% Stake	—	—	—	—	$50k for 50% Stake	Accepted Counter Offer
4	Sam Begg	"Hit With Me"; An app that helps individuals find someone to play tennis with	$250,000	Counter Offer $50k for 49% Stake	—	—	—	—	Accepted Counter Offer $50k for 49% Stake	Accepted Counter Offer

=== Episode 11 ===
#	Entrepreneur(s)	Idea	Business Valuation	Initial Offer	Sharks Offers					Final Deal
#	Entrepreneur(s)	Idea	Business Valuation	Initial Offer	Steve	Janine	Andrew	Naomi	Glen	Final Deal
1	Dennis, Dimitri & Leon	"Kisa Phone"; Easy to use mobile phone for the elderly	$4 million	$200k for 5% Stake	—	$200k for 20% Stake	$200k for 15% Stake	$100k for 10% Stake + $100k Loan	—	Accepted Naomi's Offer
2	Robert Crocitti & Michael Nuciforo	"Parkhound"; A company that finds and leases affordable parking spaces from property managers	$4 million	$400k for 10% Stake	—	$400k for 33% Stake	—	$400k for 30% Stake (Share with Glen)	$200k for 15% Stake + $200k Loan	Rejected Naomi and Glen's Offer
2	Robert Crocitti & Michael Nuciforo	"Parkhound"; A company that finds and leases affordable parking spaces from property managers	$4 million	Counter Offer $400k for 20% Stake (Naomi & Glen)	—	$400k for 33% Stake	—	$400k for 30% Stake (Share with Glen)	$400k for 30% Stake (Share with Naomi)	Rejected Naomi and Glen's Offer
3	Tom Maclean	"Sofi Spritz"; An all-natural, Australian wine spritzer	$1.3 million	$130k for 10% Stake	$130k for 10% Stake (Share with Glen)	$130k for 17% Stake	$130k for 15% Stake	—	$130k for 12% Stake	Accepted Steve & Glen's Offer
3	Tom Maclean	"Sofi Spritz"; An all-natural, Australian wine spritzer	$1.3 million	$130k for 10% Stake	$130k for 10% Stake (Share with Glen)	$180k for 17% Stake	$130k for 15% Stake	—	$130k for 10% Stake (Share with Steve)	Accepted Steve & Glen's Offer
4	Fitzy & Wippa	"Mup"; A mint built into the underside of a coffee cup	$6 million	$300k for 5% Stake	—	$500k for 5% Stake	$500k for 5% Stake	$500k for 2.5% Stake	$300k for 100% Stake	Rejected Offers

=== Episode 12 ===
#	Entrepreneur(s)	Idea	Business Valuation	Initial Offer	Sharks Offers					Final Deal
#	Entrepreneur(s)	Idea	Business Valuation	Initial Offer	Steve	Janine	Andrew	Naomi	Glen	Final Deal
1	Joel Norford	"Pentablock"; A unique interlocking construction block	$3.5 million	$350k for 10% Stake	—	$150k for 17% Stake + $200k Loan	—	—	$350k for 33% Stake	Accepted Janine's Offer
2	Benny Tong	"Bitzong Robotics"; A robotic alarm clock	$200,000	$20k for 10% Stake	—	—	—	—	—	No Offers
3	Paul Watts & Lisa Pallazi	"Nit Ninjas"; A cotton lace hat insert that treats and prevents nit infestations	$400,000	$80k for 20% Stake	—	—	—	—	—	No Offers
4	Joanne Bowskill & Holly Boal	"Get Kids Cooking"; Hands-on cooking classes for primary school children	$1.5 million	$150k for 10% Stake	$150k for 40% Stake	—	—	—	$150k for 30% Stake	Accepted Counter Offer
4	Joanne Bowskill & Holly Boal	"Get Kids Cooking"; Hands-on cooking classes for primary school children	$1.5 million	Counter Offer $150k for 20% Stake	$150k for 40% Stake	—	—	—	Accepted Counter Offer $150k for 20% Stake	Accepted Counter Offer

=== Episode 13 ===
#	Entrepreneur(s)	Idea	Business Valuation	Initial Offer	Sharks Offers					Final Deal
#	Entrepreneur(s)	Idea	Business Valuation	Initial Offer	Steve	Janine	Andrew	Naomi	Glen	Final Deal
1	Sally Copus	"Lil Fairy Doors"; A miniature magical door children can attach to their bedroom wall allowing fairies to come and visit	$1.625 million	$325k for 20% Stake	$325k for 20% Stake	$325k for 20% Stake	$325k for 20% Stake	$325k for 20% Stake	$325k for 20% Stake	Accepted Naomi and Glen's Offer
1	Sally Copus	"Lil Fairy Doors"; A miniature magical door children can attach to their bedroom wall allowing fairies to come and visit	$1.625 million	$325k for 20% Stake	Combinated Offer $486k for 30% Stake and the option of a $325k Loan (Steve, Janine & Andrew)			Combinated Offer $325k for 20% Stake and the option of a $325k Loan (Naomi & Glen)		Accepted Naomi and Glen's Offer
2	Matt Harris	"Vegepod"; A self-contained vegetable and herb planter	$750,000	$75k for 10% Stake + $150k Loan	—	—	—	$150k for 20% Stake + $75k Loan	—	Accepted Offer
3	Luke & Vanessa Gosden	"Torque Safe"; A business that manufactures and sells safety switches for dangerous hydraulic torque tools	$2 million	$300k for 15% Stake	—	—	$450k for 50% Stake (Share with Glen & Steve)	—	$300k for 30% Stake	Accepted Counter Offer
3	Luke & Vanessa Gosden	"Torque Safe"; A business that manufactures and sells safety switches for dangerous hydraulic torque tools	$2 million	Counter Offer $500k for 50% Stake (Steve, Andrew & Glen)	Accepted Counter Offer $500k for 50% Stake (Share)	—	Accepted Counter Offer $500k for 50% Stake (Share)	—	Accepted Counter Offer $500k for 50% Stake (Share)	Accepted Counter Offer
4	Greg Ollerhead & Kate Fuller	"One World"; A range of furniture and house decorations	$3.5 million	$700k for 20% Stake	—	$700k for 35% Stake	—	—	$700k for 40% Stake	Accepted Offer
4	Greg Ollerhead & Kate Fuller	"One World"; A range of furniture and house decorations	$3.5 million	$700k for 20% Stake	—	$700k for 33% Stake (Share)	—	—	$700k for 33% Stake (Share)	Accepted Offer

== Ratings ==
No.	Title	Air date	Timeslot	Overnight ratings		Ref(s)
No.	Title	Air date	Timeslot	Viewers	Rank	Ref(s)
1	Episode 1	8 May 2016	Sunday 9:00pm	479,000	13	
2	Episode 2	15 May 2016	Sunday 9:00pm	449,000	13	
3	Episode 3	22 May 2016	Sunday 9:00pm	596,000	11	
4	Episode 4	25 May 2016	Wednesday 8:30pm	636,000	14	
5	Episode 5	1 June 2016	Wednesday 8:30pm	539,000	18	
6	Episode 6	8 June 2016	Wednesday 8:30pm	625,000	14	
7	Episode 7	9 June 2016	Thursday 8:30pm	609,000	11	
8	Episode 8	15 June 2016	Wednesday 8:30pm	700,000	9	
9	Episode 9	16 June 2016	Thursday 8:30pm	646,000	11	
10	Episode 10	22 June 2016	Wednesday 8:30pm	483,000	—N/a	
11	Episode 11	23 June 2016	Thursday 8:30pm	595,000	12	
12	Episode 12	30 June 2016	Thursday 9:30pm	452,000	19	
13	Episode 13	7 July 2016	Thursday 8:30pm	580,000	13	
