= Gamify (company) =

Software company

- Company type: Private
- Available in: English
- Headquarters: Sydney, Australia
- Area served: World Wide
- Founder: John Shannon
- Website: www.gamify.com
- Launched: 2011
- Current status: Active

Gamify, formerly known as iKEMU, is a Gamification Marketing Company that makes branded AdverGames. Gamify's software allows users to quickly create and deploy HTML5 games across platforms and on mobile devices and websites without the need to create code. Gamify started in 2011, and in 2016 became available on the app market for website builder Wix.com. In 2020, Shopify released Gamify game maker on their website platform.

== Overview ==
The platform allows users to upload art files and create playable links that can be embedded in company websites. This allows for AdverGame applications to be personalised and targeted towards intended customers. Gamify's platform allows for clients to keep track of user analytics, from customer engagement through data hand-over.

Gamify become widely known after its TV appearance on Channel Tens Shark Tank being mentioned by Naomi Simson and Janine Allis.
