= Glen Richards =

Glen Richards may refer to:

- Glen Richards (motorcyclist)
- Glen Richards (entrepreneur)

== See also ==
- Glenn Richards, Australian musician
