= Shark Tank (Australian TV series) =

Australian reality competition television series

- Genre: Reality
- Directed by: Randall Churchill
- Presented by: Sarah Harris (2015–2018)
- Starring: See investors
- Narrated by: Sarah Harris (2023); Osher Gunsberg (2024–)
- Country of origin: Australia
- Original language: English
- No. of seasons: 6
- No. of episodes: 61

Production
- Production locations: Sydney, New South Wales
- Running time: 60 minutes
- Production companies: Shine Australia (2015–2018); Curio Pictures (2023–)

Original release
- Network: Network Ten
- Release: 8 February 2015 – 7 August 2018
- Release: 29 August 2023 – present

Shark Tank is an Australian reality competition television series on Network Ten, in which aspiring entrepreneur-contestants made business presentations to a panel of investors called "sharks". Six seasons of the program aired, spanning 2015–2018 and 2023–2024. Shark Tank was filmed at Disney Studios Australia.

== Format ==
Hosted by Sarah Harris, the show featured a panel of multimillionaire investors called "Sharks" who listened to entrepreneurs pitch businesses or products they wished to develop. If one or more Sharks were interested, investment deals could be made on the show. However, if all sharks declined, contestants left with nothing. A 2018 investigation by Fairfax Media revealed that during the 2017 season, fifty pitches resulted in twenty-seven deals, of which only four actually closed.

Shark Tank has been described as demonstrating "the drama of pitch meetings and the interaction between the entrepreneurs and tycoons." Sharks were compensated for their participation but invested their own money.

== History ==
Shark Tank was the second Australian series to be based on the show format. A previous unsuccessful adaptation, Dragons' Den, aired on the Seven Network in 2005.

Shark Tank premiered on 8 February 2015 and aired 15 episodes through to 7 June 2015 with a regular timeslot of 8:00pm Sunday. It was renewed for a second season in the season finale. Season 2 premiered in 2016 with Glen Richards replacing John McGrath as a panelist. The series was renewed for a third season that began airing on 20 June 2017.

In March 2023, it was announced the series would return to Network 10 later in the year, with a new panel of investors, and to be produced by Curio Pictures. On 22 March 2023, Network 10 announced the new panel of investors. The fifth season premiered on 29 August 2023. In October 2023, the series was renewed by 10 for a sixth season, which premiered on 16 October 2024.

== Season overview ==
Season	Episodes	Originally aired	
Season	Episodes	Season premiere	Season finale
1	15	8 February 2015	7 June 2015
2	13	8 May 2016	7 July 2016
3	13	20 June 2017	19 September 2017
4	13	15 May 2018	7 August 2018
5	8	29 August 2023	17 October 2023
6	8	16 October 2024	11 December 2024

== Sharks ==
Sharks	Seasons					
Sharks	1	2	3	4	5	6
Steve Baxter (Internet pioneer)	Main					
Janine Allis (Boost Juice)	Main					
Andrew Banks (Talent2)	Main					
Naomi Simson (RedBalloon)	Main					
John McGrath (McGrath Estate Agents)	Main					
Dr. Glen Richards (Greencross Vets)		Main				
Davie Fogarty (Davie Group)					Main	
Jane Lu (Showpo)					Main	
Robert Herjavec (Herjavec Group)					Main	
Sabri Suby (King Kong Digital Marketing Agency)					Main	
Catriona Wallace (Responsible Metaverse Alliance)					Main	
Nick Bell (Tech Entrepreneur)						Main
Maxine Horne (Vita Group)						Main

== Season ratings ==
Season	Timeslot	Episodes	Premiere	Finale	Season Average
1	Sunday 8:00 pm	15	8 February 2015	7 June 2015	649,000
2	Various	13	8 May 2016	7 July 2016	568,000
3	Various	13	20 June 2017	19 September 2017	530,000
4	Tuesday 8:30 pm	13	15 May 2018	7 August 2018	522,000
5	Tuesday 7:30 pm	8	29 August 2023	17 October 2023	243,000
6	Wednesday 8:50 pm (ep. 1), Wednesday 7:30 pm (ep. 2–8)	8	16 October 2024	11 December 2024	TBA

== Awards ==
Year	Award	Category	Result	Ref.
2025	TV Week Logies	Best Structured Reality Program	Nominated	
