= The Party People =

Australian party store chain

The Party People is a retail party supply chain based in Australia. It operates the largest retail party supplies outlet in Australia, as well as Australia's most visited online party supply store. The website services customers in Australia, Canada, Japan, New Zealand, Singapore, United Kingdom and the United States.

== History ==
The Party People was founded by Mala Salakas and her father Peter Nikolas as a home-based family business. Their previous venture, a home-based clown hire business, became too large to run from their house. In 1985, the business started trading from a small shop front in Sans Souci, New South Wales and the retail business grew over the following years. The store moved into a new double shop front location in Sans Souci in 1995. The store focused on balloon decoration and retail party supplies. It was Australia's largest store of its kind at the time. The business started online sales in 1999, and was the first of its kind in Australia with an online presence. In 2007, Mala Salakas and Peter Nikolas sold the business to Mala's sons, Dean Salakas and Peter Salakas. On 15 September 2011, the brothers opened Australia's largest party supplies retail outlet in Drummoyne, New South Wales. This second store measures over 1700 square meters.

The business appeared on episode 7 of the Australian TV series Shark Tank where they were made an offer from Janine Allis to buy 20%, based on a AUD $2 Million valuation, which was rejected by Dean Salakas.

Dean Salakas and Peter Salakas sold The Party People in December 2024 to Sydney Party Decorations for an undisclosed sum. Dean subsequently was appointed head of growth a leading party hire company Party Hire Group.
