= Curio Pictures =

Television company in Australia

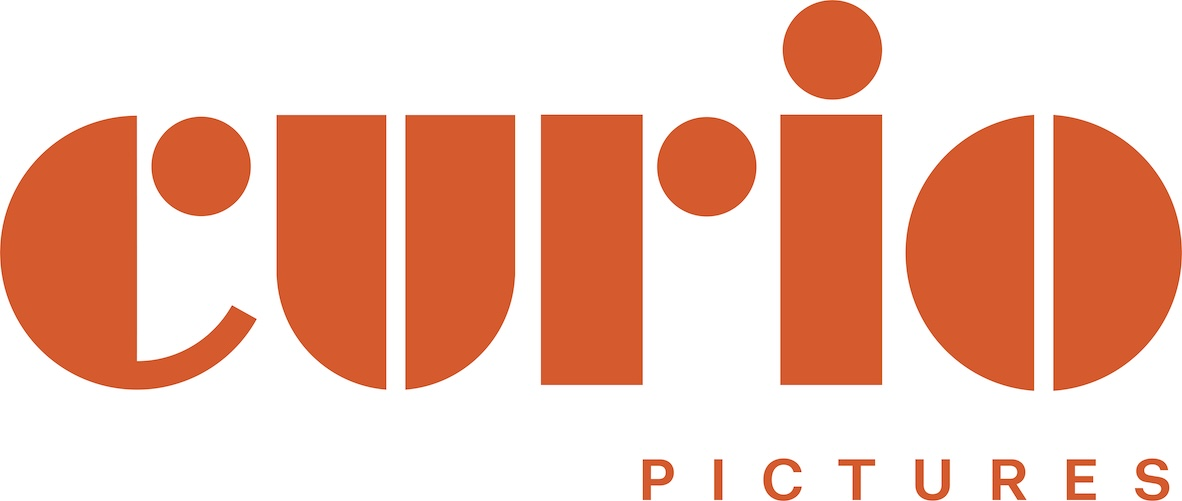
- Logo used since 2022
- Formerly: Playmaker Media (2009–2022)
- Type: Subsidiary
- Industry: Television
- Founded: 2009; 17 years ago
- Founders: David Taylor; David Maher
- Headquarters: Sydney, Australia
- Area served: Australia
- Key people: Jo Porter (managing director); Rachel Gardner (creative director)
- Services: Television program production
- Parent: Sony Pictures (2014–present)
- Website: www.curiopictures.com

Curio Pictures (also known as Curio Entertainment and formerly Playmaker Media) is an Australian-based television production company, which develops and produces scripted and unscripted television programs across multiple television channels in Australia. The company was originally formed under the name Playmaker Media, by David Taylor and David Maher in 2009. In 2014, it became a subsidiary of Sony Pictures under its Television International Production division, taking over distribution for the company's productions. The company is based in Sydney.

In 2022, Playmaker Media was renamed as Curio Pictures under Jo Porter and Rachel Gardner following the departure of founders David Taylor and David Maher in 2021.

Playmaker Media logo, used from 2009 to 2022

== Productions ==
Programs with a shaded background indicate a Playmaker production.

Title	Network	Years	Format	Duration
The Artful Dodger	Disney+	2023–2026	Drama series	Season 1 & 2, 8 episodes
Millionaire Hot Seat	Network Ten	2026–present	Game show	
Playing Gracie Darling	Paramount+	2025	Drama series	1 season, 6 episodes
The Narrow Road to the Deep North	Amazon Prime Video	2025	Miniseries	1 season, 5 episodes
High Country †	Foxtel / Binge	2024–present	Drama	1 season, 8 episodes, Season 2 in production
Shark Tank	Network Ten	2023–present	Reality	2 seasons, 16 episodes
Amazing Grace	Nine Network	2021	Drama series	1 season, 8 episodes
Bloom	Stan	2019–2020	Drama series	2 seasons, 12 episodes
Reckoning	AXN	2019	Drama series	1 season, 10 episodes
The Commons	Stan	2019	Drama series	1 season, 8 episodes
Chosen	iQiyi	2018	Miniseries	1 season, 3 episodes
Bite Club	Nine Network	2018	Drama series	1 season, 8 episodes
Blind Date (season 7)	Network Ten	2018	Light entertainment	1 season, 10 episodes
Friday on My Mind	ABC	2017	Miniseries	1 season, 2 episodes
The Wrong Girl	Network Ten	2016–2017	Drama series	2 seasons, 18 episodes
Hiding	ABC	2015	Drama series	1 season, 8 episodes
The Code	ABC	2014–2016	Drama series	2 seasons, 12 episodes
Love Child	Nine Network	2014–2017	Drama series	4 seasons, 36 episodes
House Husbands	Nine Network	2012–2017	Drama	5 seasons, 58 episodes
Slide	FOX8	2011	Drama series	1 season, 10 episodes
Blood Brothers	Nine Network	2011	Telemovie	
Wicked Love: The Maria Korp Story	Nine Network	2010	Telemovie	
