= Greencross =

Australian pet care company

- Type: Private
- Industry: Pet products and services
- Founded: 1994; 32 years ago
- Founder: Glen Richards
- Owner: TPG Capital
- Website: www.greencrosslimited.com.au

Greencross is an Australian pet care company. It operates the Petbarn and Greencross Vets chains in Australia. It jointly owns the Animates chain in New Zealand with EBOS Group. Founded in 1994 by veterinarian Glen Richards, the company went public on the Australian Securities Exchange in 2007 before being purchased by TPG Capital in 2019.

== History ==
Greencross was founded in 1994 by veterinarian Glen Richards. While practicing companion animal medicine and surgery in Townsville, he purchased Currajong veterinary hospital. This was the start of Greencross.

The company expanded by purchasing and consolidating veterinary services through Australia and went public on the Australian Securities Exchange in 2007, becoming the first veterinary practice in Australia to do so.

In June 2013, Greencross acquired the Pet Cemetery & Crematorium in Greenbank for $1.45 million. In 2014, Greencross acquired Mammoth Pet Holdings, the parent of the Petbarn chain in Australia and the Animates chain New Zealand. Later that year, it acquired the Western Australian-based City Farmers chain of 21 stores for $205 million.

In February 2019, it was announced that TPG Capital would purchase Greencross and take it private for A$675 million in cash and scrip.

In February 2022, TPG sold a 45 per cent stake in Greencross to AustralianSuper and the Healthcare of Ontario Pension Plan.

In late 2023, EBOS Group attempted to purchase Greencross for A$3.75 billion. However, the deal was called off after weak demand from EBOS's investors to fund the takeover.

In July 2026, Coles Group Limited was set to acquire the company for $4 billion after nine months of negotiations, however they announced they had "ceased discussions" and called off the deal without any further information.

== Divisions ==
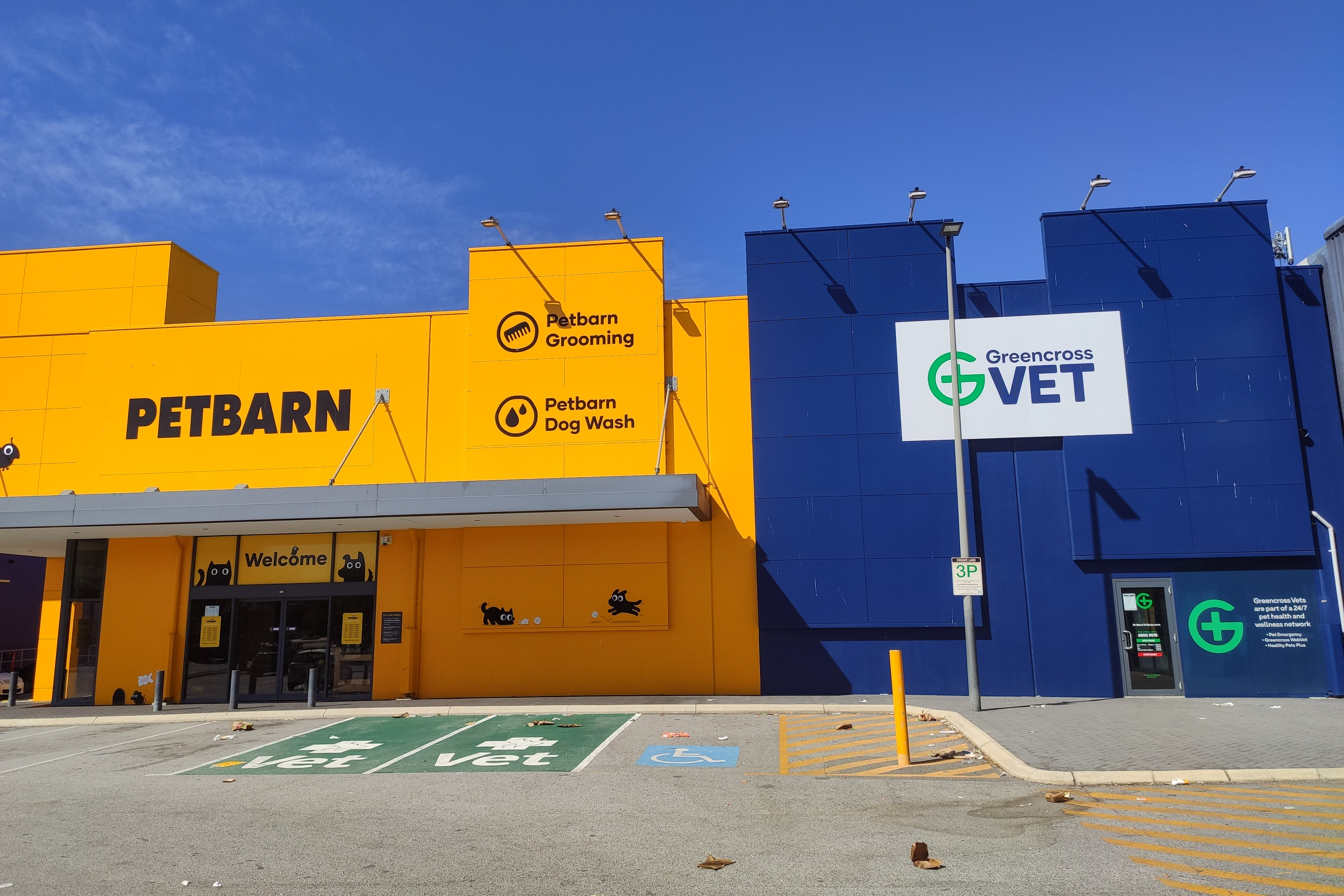
A Petbarn and Greencross Vet adjacent to each other in Cannington, Western Australia

- Petbarn – Australian pet store chain
- Greencross Vets
- Animates – New Zealand pet store chain. The chain is a 50-50 joint venture with EBOS Group.
