= Hamdog =

Sandwich made of a split beef patty and a hot dog

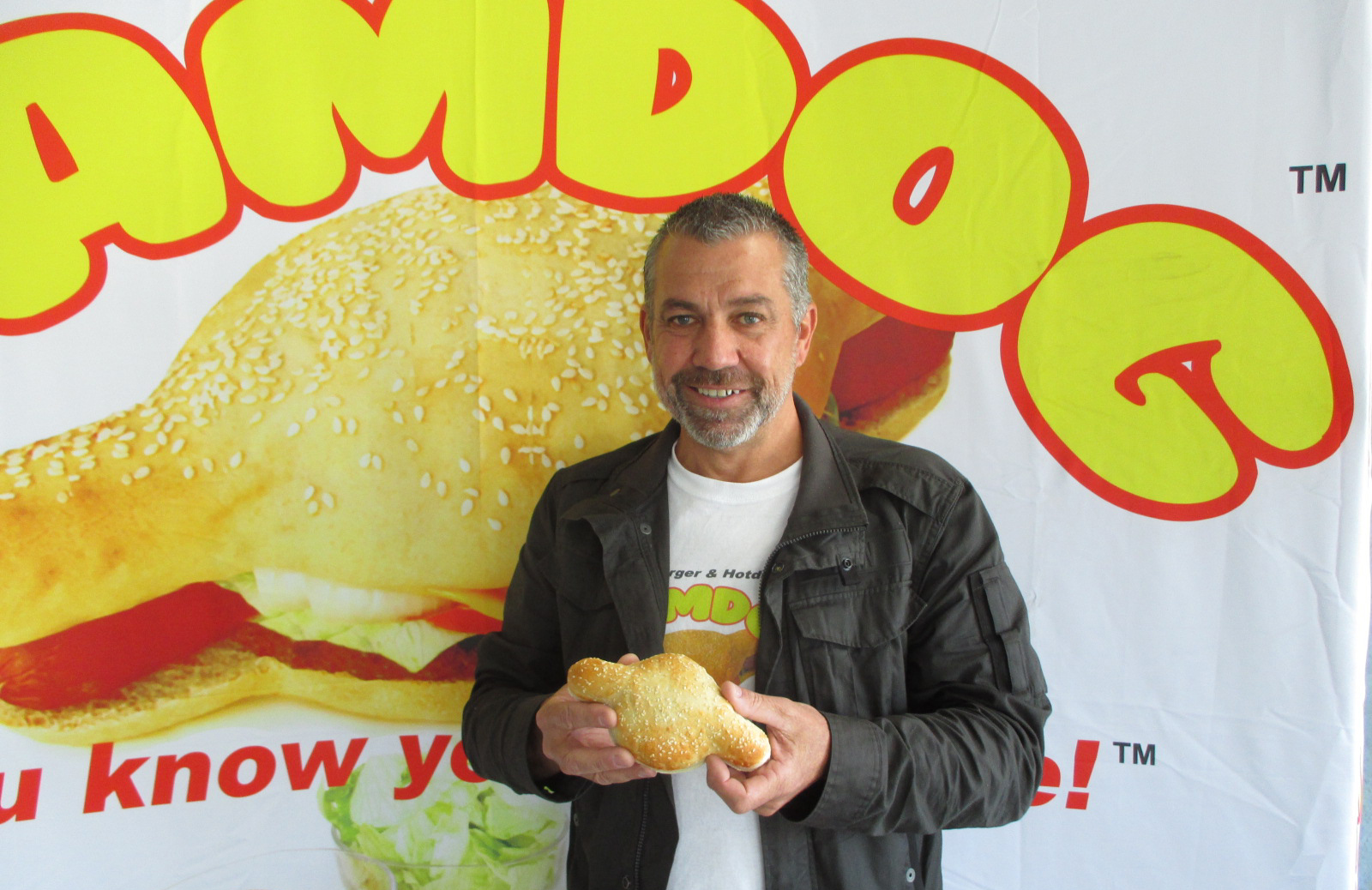
- Creator of the Hamdog, Mark Murray.
- Place of origin: Australia
- Region or state: Western Australia
- Created by: Mark Anthony Murray
- Main ingredients: Hot dog, beef patty
- Variations: Chili, cheese, onions, egg, potatoes, hoagie roll
- Food energy (per serving): 623 (315 from fat)
- Other information: Fat 35 g

A hamdog is a combination of a hamburger and a hot dog. Dishes of this name have been invented in Australia and the United States.

== Australia ==
Australian Mark Murray conceived one kind of hamdog in 2004. His version contains a beef patty cut in two, with a frankfurter placed in between the two patties, then topped off with cheese, pickles, sauces, tomato, lettuce and onion. He received a US design patent for the specially shaped bun in 2009.

== United States ==
Another variety of hamdog was invented in February 2005 by Chandler Goff, the owner of a bar in Decatur, Georgia. This version consists of a hot dog wrapped in a half pound of hamburger with bacon, cheese and onion on a hoagie bun which is deep-fried and served with a fried egg on top and a side of French fries. He started selling it at the Indiana State Fair in 2006. A hamdog eating contest was established in Vadnais Heights, Minnesota, in 2007 by Jimmy's Food and Drink. There is no reward for the winner other than bragging rights.

Dr. Nicholas Lang, professor of surgery at the University of Arkansas for Medical Sciences, advised against consuming a hamdog, even as a one-time snack.

== See also ==
- Hot dog variations
- List of hamburgers
- List of hot dogs
- List of regional dishes of the United States
- List of sandwiches
- Southern cuisine
