= Catriona Wallace =

Australian businesswoman, TV personality and former police officer

- Born: 1965 or 1966 (age 60–61)
- Education: University of New South Wales (PhD)
- Occupations: Businesswoman, police officer
- Television: Shark Tank

Catriona Wallace (born 1965 or 1966) is an Australian businesswoman, TV personality, and former police officer. Her work involves the metaverse, artificial intelligence and the responsible use of technology.

Wallace founded Flamingo AI in 2013 and Responsible Metaverse Alliance in 2022. In March 2023, Wallace was announced as one of the new "Sharks" on Shark Tank on Network 10.

== Career ==
Catriona Wallace was born in 1965 or 1966. She joined the New South Wales Police Force at the age of 19, and worked as a police officer in Kings Cross and The Rocks during the 1980s.

After about four years of police work, Wallace left to complete an undergraduate degree in arts as well as a master's degree and a PhD (Doctor of Philosophy) at the University of New South Wales in 2007. Her PhD thesis explored the role of technology as a substitute for leadership.

In 2005, Wallace co-founded the company Fifth Quadrant and research organisation ACA Research.

Wallace founded Flamingo AI in 2014. In 2016, it became the second woman-led business to be listed on the Australian Stock Exchange. The company developed chatbots for companies such as Credit Union Australia, Chubb Limited and AMP Limited. Wallace also held the position of the company's chief executive officer until February 2019 prior to the company offloading its assets and its sale to private investors in 2020.

In 2015, Wallace led The Ventura, a co-working space for female-led start-up businesses under three years old with less than $1 million in revenue. To be eligible, companies were required to have a woman as its founder, co-founder or chief executive officer.

Wallace won the business and entrepreneur category at The Australian Financial Review Women of Influence Awards in 2018. Wallace was also inducted into the Royal Institution of Australia.

In 2022, Wallace co-authored Checkmate Humanity: The How and Why of Responsible AI.

Wallace is an adjunct professor at the University of New South Wales' Australian Graduate School of Management and a chair of Boab AI. She was previously a Director of the Garvan Institute, the Gradient Institute and a co-chair of Sir Richard Branson's The B Team.

In March 2023, Wallace was one of five new Australian "Sharks" announced for a new series of the Shark Tank TV series, a role that she originally declined when first approached, saying "I don't behave like a shark, so no, I don't think it's for me".

== Personal life ==
Wallace is non-binary and gender queer.
