= John McGrath (businessman) =

Australian real estate entrepreneur

John McGrath is an Australian entrepreneur in the real estate industry.

McGrath is the founder, current Managing Director and Chief Executive Officer of McGrath Estate Agents, a real estate company in Australia. The company was listed on the ASX beginning in 2015, with McGrath retaining 22.11% share of the company. With 108 offices in 2022, McGrath Estate Agents is considered one of Australia's largest real estate networks.

McGrath is a former judge on the Channel 9 renovation TV show The Block and was an investor on season 1 of Shark Tank in 2015.
