= Naomi Simson =

Australian businesswoman, keynote speaker

Naomi Simson OAM
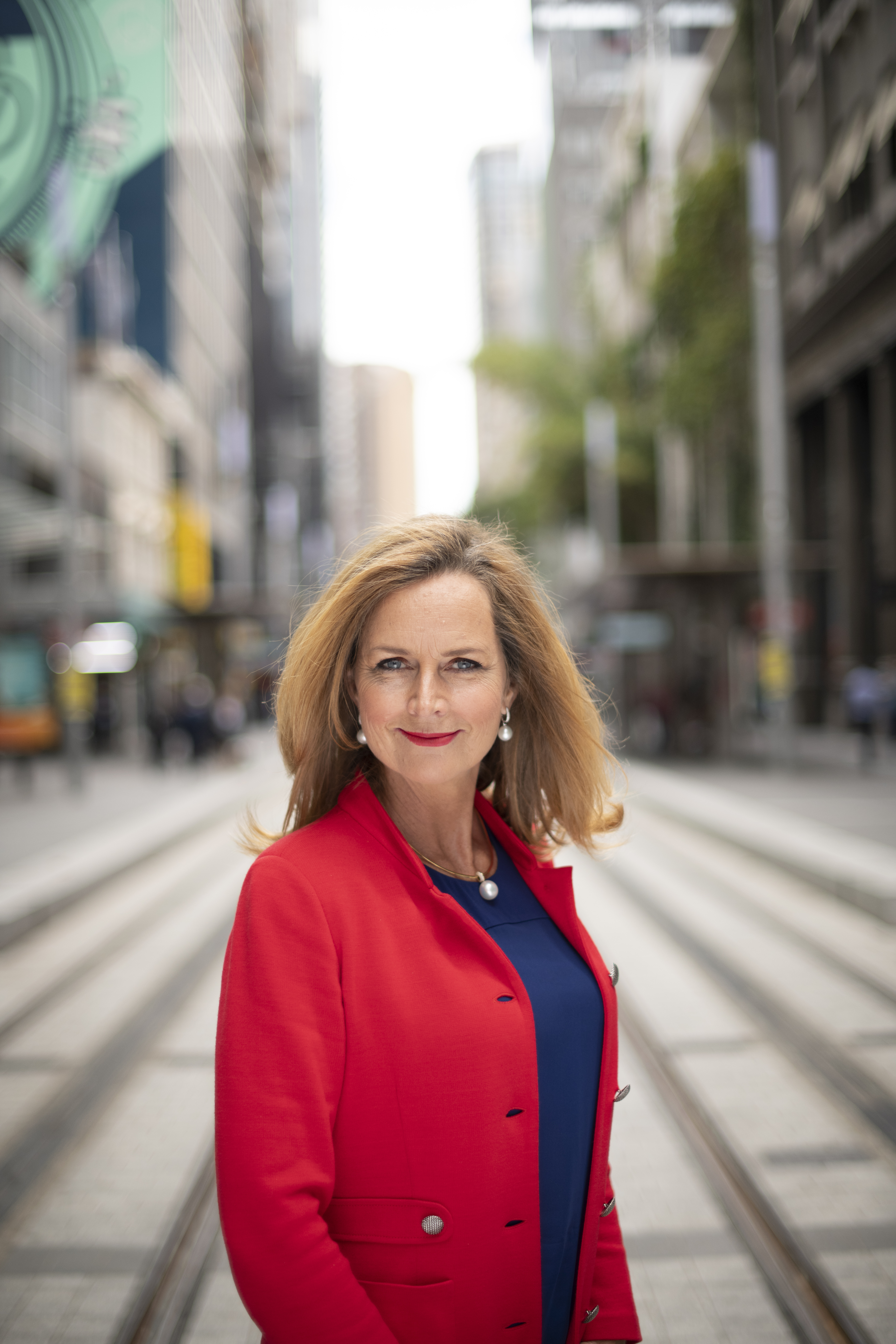
- Born: February 22, 1964 (age 62)
- Occupations: Businessperson, Entrepreneur, Television Personality, Podcaster, Philanthropist, Blogger, Keynote Speaker
- Television: Shark Tank (Australian TV series)
- Spouse: Stuart King (m. 2016-present)
- Awards: 2013 Lifetime Achievement Silver Stevie Award
- Honors: Medal of the Order of Australia 2026

Naomi Simson OAM (born 22 February 1964) is an Australian businessperson, entrepreneur, podcaster and blogger. After launching the Australian online success story RedBalloon in 2001, Naomi went on to co-found Big Red Group with partner David Anderson in 2017. Headquartered in Sydney's CBD, Big Red Group is the largest marketplace of experiences in ANZ, and home to leading brands including Adrenaline, Experience Oz, Local Agent, Everything NZ, and RedBalloon. In 2026, Simson was awarded a Medal of the Order of Australia for her services to business, entrepreneurship and leadership.

== Career ==
Simson began her career in the corporate marketing field and gained experience with IBM, KPMG, Apple Computer Australia, and Ansett Australia. In 2001, she founded RedBalloon, an online experience gift retailer based in Australia. She began the company out of her house with a $25,000 personal investment and grew it to 46 employees by 2011. Simson was CEO of the company until 2011 when she took a step back from the operational side of the business. In 2017, Simson co-founded Big Red Group with David Anderson, a company that became the parent company for RedBalloon. It also acquired and operates the companies Adrenaline, Experience Oz, Local Agent and Everything NZ.

In late 2014, Simson was named as one of five 'Sharks' on Network Ten's Shark Tank in Australia along with Andrew Banks, John McGrath, Steve Baxter, and Janine Allis. Simson's time on Shark Tank was spent supporting the start-up community and investing in many businesses during all four seasons of the show. Simson had much advice for the start-up community about pitching, purpose and scaling. Simson has also been a guest host on Network Ten's Studio 10.

Simson was a secret millionaire in the 2009 season of the reality television show The Secret Millionaire – Australia. On the show, Simson volunteered for 10 days in different disadvantaged areas of Australia. Upon conclusion of the show, Simson reveals her true identity to others and donates money to a number of the causes and individuals she volunteered for during the show. She was one of five benefactors for the season who gave more than $750,000 to various individuals and organisations in the community.

Simson is a blogger and owner of NaomiSimson.com, ranked number two in the 15 Top Business Blogs by SmartCompany.com as of 2016. Simson was named one of Australia's best business bloggers as far back as 2009 and in 2020 was named top business blogger. Simson has the furthest reach for any Australian on the LinkedIn business networking platform with close to 3 million followers.

Simson is the author of two books, Live What You Love (2015) and Ready to Soar (2016). She was one of 13 authors who collaborated to write the 2008 book The Power of More Than One:Success Strategies from Australasia's Leading Business and Motivational Specialists and also wrote a preface for the 2013 book Appvertising – How Apps are Changing the World. In 2016 she released the book Ready to Soar: Turn Your Brilliant Idea into a Business You Love.

Simson is a professional keynote speaker. Her speaking engagements have included Zendesk's Relate Live conference in Sydney in 2016, the Reimagine Regional Business event in Singleton, New South Wales, in 2023, and the Growth Summit in Sydney in June 2026, where she delivered the keynote address. She was also a keynote speaker at the University of Melbourne's 12th Professional Staff Conference, held at the Melbourne Convention and Exhibition Centre on 15 September 2026.

== Philanthropy ==
Simson is an active philanthropist with extensive board and advisory involvement across multiple organizations. She donates her time and resources to many not for profit organizations. She has served as a Governor of the Cerebral Palsy Alliance Research Foundation since July 2013, and was a member of the council of Voiceless to advocate for greater animal protection from 2009 - 2017. Simson served for around a decade on the Faculty of Business and Economics Board at the University of Melbourne. She is a National Ambassador for Apropela (formerly Heads Over Heels), an organisation supporting female entrepreneurs, with which she has held volunteer roles.

== Honours ==
- Medal of the Order of Australia (OAM), 2026, for services to business, entrepreneurship and leadership.

== Publications ==
- Ready To Soar (2016) ISBN 9781760372446
- Live What You Love (2015) ISBN 9781743569917

== Awards and recognition ==
Simson has won numerous awards throughout her career, including the 2005 Westpac NSW Entrepreneur of the Year. Additional recognition includes the national Business Innovation Award at the 2008 Telstra Business Women's Awards, the national Industry category of the 2011 Ernst & Young Entrepreneur of the Year Awards, and the 2013 Lifetime Achievement Silver Stevie Award. In 2025, Simson was elevated to Fellow of the Australian Institute of Company Directors (FAICD), a recognition granted to seasoned directors who have demonstrated directorship expertise and contributed significantly to governance in Australia.

=== Select awards ===
- 2013, Pearcey Entrepreneur of the Year Award
- 2013, Lifetime Achievement Silver Stevie Award
- 2011, Ernst & Young Entrepreneur of the Year Award
- 2008, Telstra Business Women's Awards, national Business Innovation Award
- 2005, Westpac NSW Entrepreneur of the Year Award
