= Glen Richards (entrepreneur) =

Australian veterinary physician and businessman

- Born: 1965 (age 60–61); Richmond, Queensland
- Education: University of Queensland; James Cook University
- Occupations: Veterinary physician, Entrepreneur, Investor
- Known for: Founder of Greencross
- Spouse: Lisa Richards
- Children: 3

Glen Richards (born 1965) is an Australian veterinary physician and businessman. He is the founder and former CEO of Greencross, the largest pet care company in Australia.

== Education ==
Richards studied veterinary science at the University of Queensland in 1988 and obtained a master's degree at James Cook University.

== Career ==
Richards practised companion animal medicine and surgery in Brisbane, Townsville, and London. He purchased Currajong Veterinary Hospital in Townsville in 1994 which was the start of his veterinary company that became known as Greencross.

Richards is the founder of Greencross, the largest pet care company in Australia. The company was publicly traded on the ASX and operates under the names Greencross, Petbarn, City Farmers, and Animates. Richards is a company director for six allied health and veterinary business. In addition to Greencross, he is a director for both Petbarn and Montserrat Day Clinics. He is also an advisor for enterprises that spun out of Shark Tank, including the furniture distributor OneWorld.

Richards joined season 2 of Shark Tank in 2016 as an investor, replacing John McGrath.

In September 2024, Richards became chairman of private equity firm Arbor Permanent Owners following its establishment in April. He also invested in the firm's capital raise.
