= Andrew Banks =

English-Australian businessman and film producer

- Born: 30 November 1951 (age 74); Lambeth, England, United Kingdom
- Occupations: Businessman and film producer
- Television: Shark Tank Seasons 1–4
- Board member of: NIDA Foundation Trust; Age of Learning/ABCmouse (International Board); MyMentor (Advisory Board)

Andrew Richard Banks (born 30 November 1951) is an English-Australian businessman and film producer. He co-founded recruitment company Morgan & Banks and founded HR business process outsourcing provider, Talent2 International. He was one of the 'Sharks' on the television series Shark Tank.

== Early life ==
Banks was born on 30 November 1951 in Lambeth, London, England, the fifth of six boys. His father was a staff sergeant in the Medical Corps of the British Army. His mother was born in Vienna and grew up in Gdańsk, Poland; she was fluent in six languages.

When the family moved to Chichester in 1961, Banks attended the local selective state grammar school and became involved in amateur dramatic productions. Achieving ten 'O’ Levels and four 'A’ levels, he was accepted at various UK universities and chose Science at London University. Banks completed a year and a half of exams in Applied Biology before getting a part-time job selling paintings door-to-door and progressed quickly to supervisor with the company, running an area office of ten teams. At the same time he was doing voiceover work using his acting experience as well as employing two people to sell trendy 'Carnaby Street style' shirts in the University cafeteria.

His university degree was put on hold after an Australian colleague provided a sponsor that enabled Banks to migrate to Australia as part of the final stages of its Assisted Passage Migration Scheme; Andrew Banks arrived in Sydney, Australia in 1972 as a 'Ten Pound Pom'.

== Early career ==
In Australia, Banks pursued an acting career through studies in Shakespearean Training at the Old Tote Theatre Company (now NIDA – National Institute of Dramatic Art]). He had small acting roles in television series Number 96 and the Old Tote Theatre Company's production of Macbeth at the Sydney Opera House in 1974. Banks bought into the Red Pavilion Bar and Restaurant in Woolloomooloo, Sydney with restaurateur Soren Luno as partner. Its sale fourteen months later was when Banks realised his first capital. Banks married his Australian girlfriend, Andrea in 1974 and following an overseas honeymoon, decided to pursue more stable employment.

== HR career ==
Banks' interest in human resources and recruiting began while working with French oil company, Elf Aquitaine. Returning to London, roles followed with Brown and Root (now Halliburton) involving moves to Norway, USA and then back to the UK as Regional HR Director for the Europe and Africa Marine Division. Returning to Australia in 1980, Banks accepted an advertised role as a recruiter with Slade Consulting in Sydney. He opened and established their new Brisbane office then returned to Sydney to manage both the Sydney and Brisbane offices until December 1984.

In 1985, with new business partner Geoff Morgan, recruitment company Morgan & Banks was founded. Morgan & Banks grew to command 17 percent market share in Australia and Asia, with sales over A$850m; it went public in 1995. In 1999, Morgan & Banks merged with TMP/Monster a US-listed NASDAQ company. Banks spent three years in New York with TMP Worldwide as Global Director, responsible for over 50 acquisitions and 4,500 staff operating in 32 countries, before returning to Sydney in 2002.

In December 2003 Banks launched Talent2 International, an ASX-listed company with a focus on HR Outsourcing and Executive Search and Selection. Geoff Morgan served as a Non-Executive Director on the Board.

Talent2 had operations in 20 countries before its privatisation in 2012 via a joint venture between Morgan & Banks Investments (MBI) and US company, Allegis Group Inc, the largest privately owned staffing firm in the world. A 100% acquisition of Talent2 by Allegis Group Inc, was finalised in July 2014

Banks served as an Advisor to the Search practice of the company until July 2015.

== Entrepreneur ==
Andrew Banks has been investing in various types of companies in Australia since 1988, including property development and home apartment renovation, residential hotels (Sebel Manly), commercial property (53 Martin Place), as well as operating businesses such as Krispy Kreme Australia, a cosmetics distributor and an online recruiting entity.

In 2015 Banks appeared as one of the 'Sharks' on the inaugural season of Shark Tank where he invested in Bottlepops, Synxsole and the Hamdog. Banks returned for the second season Shark Tank Australia in 2016 as well as the third season, which aired in 2017.

== Other activities ==
Andrew retains an interest in film and theatre. He has served as Chairman of the NIDA Foundation Trust (National Institute of Dramatic Arts Foundation Trust), resigning in 2014 due to his move offshore. Banks continues as a Trust Director. Banks is founding partner and producer of production company, Lila 9th Productions, together with Cameron Lamb and the company is actively developing new projects. Lila 9th Productions' completed movie projects include 'Daydream Nation' (Canada), 'Syrup' and 'Kumiko the Treasure Hunter' which won a Sundance award in 2014.

Banks is a member of business leaders' group WPO (World presidents' Organisation) following on from membership of YPO (Young presidents' Organisation) which he joined in 1988.

Together with Geoff Morgan, Andrew Banks has authored four books on recruiting:

- Flourish & Prosper (2005);
- Achieving Your Dream Career (2002);
- The Morgan and Banks Guide to: Getting That Job (1994);
- Going Up - How to Get, Keep and Advance Your Career (1988)

Banks resides with his wife in Sydney and is a frequent visitor to the US where his children and their families live.

== Recognition ==
In 2015, Andrew Banks, together with Geoff Morgan, was voted equal first in an industry poll of The 5 Most Influential People in the Recruitment Industry in the past 60 years.

In 2014, Andrew Banks and Geoff Morgan were inaugural inductees to the Recruitment International (Australia) Recruitment Industry Hall of Fame, for individuals who have made significant contribution to the Australian recruitment industry during their career.

In 2004, Andrew Banks and Geoff Morgan won the Ernst & Young Australia, Master Entrepreneur of the Year Award (Eastern Region) for sustained success in business.
