= Steve Baxter (entrepreneur) =

Australian investor and entrepreneur

- Born: 1971 (age 54–55); Cloncurry, Queensland
- Occupations: Investor, entrepreneur
- Spouse: Emily Baxter
- Children: 3

Steve Baxter is an Australian investor and entrepreneur. He was one of the 'sharks' on the Australian television series Shark Tank.

== Early life ==
Steve Baxter was born in the remote town of Cloncurry, Australia, and raised in Emerald in Queensland's Central Highlands Region. He moved to Rockhampton and attended North Rockhampton State High School. He left school at 15 and joined the army, enlisting in its apprenticeship program. There, he became an engineer working in the field of electronics, telecoms, and guided weapon systems.

== Career ==
Baxter's career in the Australian Army spanned nine years from 1986 to 1995. In 1994, at the age of 23, Baxter put his life savings of $11,000 into his first start-up, an internet service provider, SE Net from the spare room of his Adelaide home. With more than 35,000 customers, SE Net was eventually acquired by OzEmail/UUNet under future Australian Prime Minister, Malcolm Turnbull.

In 2001, Baxter and schoolmate Bevan Slattery launched his second start-up, PIPE Networks. On 30 June 2008, Baxter resigned as Chief Technology Officer of PIPE Networks and moved to California to work with Google as a Technical Program Manager leading a project to deliver high-speed telecommunications systems across North America. Baxter remained a non-executive director of PIPE Networks until it was sold to TPG in April 2010.

In March 2012, Baxter launched River City Labs in Brisbane, a co-working community to encourage entrepreneurs in Queensland. In 2013, he co-founded Right Pedal Studios, a mobile gaming accelerator, and StartupAUS, an advocacy group for Australian tech startups.

In October 2014, Baxter invested heavily in Australian start-ups, helping to launch companies which together now have a valuation of more than $100 million.

In 2014 and 2015, Baxter funded the Startup Catalyst program, in which 20 young Queenslanders with the potential to be globally successful tech entrepreneurs, were sent to San Francisco to be immersed in the startup and entrepreneurial culture. Baxter said, "I love the term 'startup ebola.' It speaks to the contagious nature of what we are trying to do. We want the 20 young people we took this year to infect another 20 each on their return."

In November 2014, Baxter was announced as one of the "sharks" on Network Ten's Shark Tank. The series premiered in February 2015.

In October 2017, Baxter was appointed Queensland's chief entrepreneur, replacing Mark Sowerby.

In October 2023, Baxter’s company Pesca Aviation donated $20,000 to Advance, supporting the “No”campaign in Australia's Voice to Parliament referendum, which sought not to recognize First Australians in the constitution.

== Personal life ==
Baxter has three daughters with his wife Emily.

In 2023, Baxter opposed the Albanese government's proposal for Indigenous Voice to Parliament.
