= Dragons' Den =

Reality television program

- Created by: Nippon TV
- Original work: The Tigers of Money (マネーの虎, manē no tora) (Japan)
- Owner: Nippon TV
- Years: October 6, 2001–March 29, 2004

Films and television
- Television series: Dragons' Den (see franchises)

Miscellaneous
- Genre: Reality television
- First aired: October 6, 2001; 25 years ago
- Distributor: Sony Pictures

Dragons' Den, also known as Shark Tank, is a reality television program format in which entrepreneurs pitch their business ideas to a panel of venture capitalists in the hope of securing investment finance from them. The program originated in 2001 in Japan, where it is known as The Tigers of Money (Japanese: マネーの虎, romanized: manē no tora), a pun on "The Tiger of Malaya" (マレーの虎, marē no tora), which was the nickname of WWII general Tomoyuki Yamashita. The format was created and is owned by Nippon TV and is distributed by Sony Pictures.

Local versions of the show have been produced in over 40 countries, as well as one for the Arab world; in some countries, more than one version has been aired. The first version to air outside of Japan was the British programme Dragons' Den, which launched in 2005; in the several years afterward, most versions named themselves Dragons' Den or variations thereof, though some also used other animals in the title, such as lions. The Israeli version of the show, HaKrishim ("The Sharks"), was the first to use the "shark" moniker, during its launch in 2006. Since the launch of the American version of the show, Shark Tank, in 2009, many versions have been named Shark Tank or variations thereof. In versions where the name of the show contains a creature's name, the investors are referred to by that name.

== Format ==
The contestants are usually inventors, product designers, or service operators who have what they consider to be a viable and potentially very profitable business idea, but who lack funding and/or business acumen. They pitch their idea to five rich entrepreneurial businesspeople, who in most iterations of the show are referred to as "dragons", "tigers" (in the original Japanese show), "lions" or "sharks". Before the show, the contestants have named a specific amount of money that they wish to get along with a percentage in the business that the contestant is offering to sell to the investors. The rules stipulate that if they do not raise at least this amount from the dragons, they get nothing. In return, the contestant gives the dragons a percentage of the company's capital stock, which is the chief point of negotiation. The program does not show the entire pitch as scenes are selected and edited from the episode due to time constraints.

The dragons probe the idea further once the contestant has made the presentation. This will either reveal a sound business proposition resulting in an investment offer from one or more of the dragons in return for equity or a withdrawal from the transaction by either the contestant or all of the dragons. A rejection by the dragons is often given as "I'm out" which is usually triggered (in the investor's opinion) by the investor asking for a larger equity stake in the business than the contestant wants to give up, the contestant's valuation on the business being too high compared to its overall profits, the product not having any proprietary value, or the investor's belief that they cannot add value to the business. Sometimes the dragons identify troubling facts such as an embarrassing lack of preparation on the part of the contestant, the contestant's lack of business knowledge, their perceived margins, competitors, insufficient sales, or high manufacturing costs. Contestants often negotiate and barter with the investors. The deals agreed to on the program may or may not actually be carried through.

== International adaptations ==
Currently airing
An upcoming season
Status unknown
No longer airing

International installments of Dragons' Den/Shark Tank
Country	Local title	Network	Current investors	Seasons
Afghanistan	Fikr wa Talash	TOLO	Unknown	Season 1, 2008; Season 2, 2014
Australia	Dragons' Den	Seven Network	Peter Higgins; Sarina Russo; Darryn Lyons; Suzi Dafnis; Simon Reynolds	Season 1, 2005
Australia	Shark Tank	Network 10	Current: Robert Herjavec (5–); Jane Lu (5–); Davie Fogarty (5–); Maxine Horne (6–); Nick Bell (6–); Former: Steve Baxter (1–4); Janine Allis (1–4); Andrew Banks (1–4); Naomi Simson (1–4); John McGrath (1); Glen Richards (2–4); Catriona Wallace (5); Sabri Suby (5)	Season 1, 2015; Season 2, 2016; Season 3, 2017; Season 4, 2018; Season 5, 2023; Season 6, 2024
Austria	2 Minuten 2 Millionen	Puls 4	Hans Peter Haselsteiner (1–9); Oliver Holle (1); Leo Hillinger (2–9); Michael Altrichter (1–5); Martin Rohla (6–9); Hansi Hansmann (1); Heinrich Prokop (2–5); Florian Gschwandtner (6–8); Felix Ohswald (9); Selma Prodanovic (1); Marie Hélène Ametsreiter (2–4); Katharina Schneider (5–9); Daniel Mattes (1); Daniel Zech (2–7); Philipp Maderthaner (8–9); Alexander Schuetz (8–9); Stefan Piëch (8–9)	Season 1, 2013; Season 2, 2014; Season 3, 2015; Season 4, 2016; Season 5, 2017; Season 6, 2018; Season 7, 2019; Season 8, 2020; Season 9, 2021
Bangladesh	Shark Tank Bangladesh	Bongo; Deepto TV	Sami Ahmed; Navin Ahmed; Ahmed Ali Leon; Nazim Farhan Chowdhury; Golam Murshed; Sausan Khan Moyeen; Samanzar Khan; Kazi Mahboob Hassan; Faatin Haque; Anika Chowdhury	Season 1, 2024
Belgium	Leeuwenkuil ("Lion's Den")	VIER	Bart Deconinck; Jürgen Ingels; Luc Van Mol; Conny Vandendriessche; Bart Verhaeghe	Season 1, 2018
Brazil	Shark Tank Brazil^{[pt]}	Sony Brasil	Current: José Carlos Semenzato (4–); Carol Paiffer (5–); Monique Evelle (8–); Sergio Zimerman (8–); Alexandra Casoni (9–); Former: João Appolinário (1–8); Camila Farani (1–6); Christiana Arcangeli (1–4); Robinson Shiba (1–3); Sorocaba (1); Caito Maia (2–6); Sandra Chayo (7); Joel Jota (8)	Season 1, 2016; Season 2, 2017; Season 3, 2018; Season 4, 2019; Season 5, 2020; Season 6, 2021; Season 7, 2022; Season 8, 2023; Season 9, 2024
Canada	Dragons' Den	CBC	Current: Arlene Dickinson (2–9, 12–); Manjit Minhas (10–); Michele Romanow (10–); Wes Hall (16–); Brian Scudamore (19–); Drew Scott (21-); Former: Robert Herjavec (1–6, 17–18; Kevin O'Leary (1–6); Laurence Lewin (1–2); Jennifer Wood (1); W. Brett Wilson (3–5); Bruce Croxon (6–8); Vikram Vij (9); David Chilton (7–9); Michael Wekerle (9–12); Vincenzo Guzzo (12–18); Lane Merrifield (13–15); Joe Mimran (10–12); Jim Treliving (1–15)	Season 1, 2006; Season 2, 2007; Season 3, 2008; Season 4, 2009; Season 5, 2010; Season 6, 2011; Season 7, 2012; Season 8, 2013; Season 9, 2014; Season 10, 2015; Season 11, 2016; Season 12, 2017; Season 13, 2018; Season 14, 2019; Season 15, 2020; Season 16, 2021; Season 17, 2022; Season 18, 2023; Season 19, 2024
Canada	Dans l'œil du dragon^{(fr)}	Ici Télé	Current: Christiane Germain (6–7, 10–); Isabèle Chevalier (9–); Nicolas Duvernois (9–); Georges Karam (9–); Marie-Josée Richer (9–11); David Côté (11–); Former: Danièle Henkel (1–6); François Lambert (1–3); Gaétan Frigon (1–3); Dany Vachon (1); Normand Legault (1); Serge Beauchemin (2–6); Alexandre Taillefer (2–4); Martin-Luc (4–7); Mitch Garber (4–5); Gilbert Rozon (5–6); Caroline Néron (6–7); Dominique Brown (7)	Season 1, 2012; Season 2, 2013; Season 3, 2014; Season 4, 2015; Season 5, 2016; Season 6, 2017; Season 7, 2018; Season 8, 2019; Season 9, 2020; Season 10, 2021; Season 11, 2022; Season 12, 2024
China	赢在中国 ("Win in China")	CCTV-2	Bob Xu (1–2); Annabelle Long Yu (1–2); Li Guoqing (1–2); Yao Jinbo (1–2); Hugo Shong (1); Zhou Hongyi (1); Jerry Huang (2); Jack Ma (1)	Season 1, 2006; Season 2, 2007; Season 3, 2008
Colombia	Shark Tank Colombia^{[es]}	Canal Sony	Current: Mauricio Hoyos (1–); Alexander Torrenegra (1–3, 5–); Leonardo Wehe (2–); Andrea Arnau (3–); Hanoi Morillo (4–); Miguel McAllister (5–); Álvaro Rodríguez (5–); Miguel Piedrahita (6–); Former: Ricardo Leyva (1–4); Frank Kanayet (1–3); Juliana Barreto (1–2); Alejandra Torres (3–4); Samy Bessudo (3–4); Miguel Caballero (4)	Season 1, 2018; Season 2, 2019; Season 3, 2020; Season 4, 2022; Season 5, 2023; Season 6, 2024
Croatia	Dragons' Nest	HRT	Maja Pečarević; Hrvoje Prpić; Davor Štern; Juroslav Buljubašić; Branko Roglić	Season 1, 2007 (Cancelled in production)
Czech Republic	Den D ("The D-Day")	ČT1	Dana Bérová (1–3); Marta Nováková (1–3); Tomio Okamura (1–3); Ivan Pilný (1, 3); Ondřej Bartoš (1–2); Michael Rostock (2–4); Margareta Křížová (4); Petra Rychnovská (4); John Vanhara (4); Michal Hanus (4)	Season 1, 2009; Season 2, 2010; Season 3, 2011; Season 4, 2012
Czech Republic	Jáma Lvová ("The Lion Pit")	TV Nova	Current: Jaroslav Svoboda (1–); Václav Staněk (1–); Libor Váka (1–); Radka Viktorie Dohnalová (2–); Dominik Píchal (2–); Former: Tomáš Huber (1); Barbora Snopková Haberová (1)	Season 1, 2025; Season 2, 2026
Denmark	Løvens Hule ("Lion's Den")	DR1	Current: Louise Herping Ellegaard (8–); Anne Stampe (8–); Morten Larsen (9-); Nikolaj Nyholm (9-); Tahir Siddique (9-); Former: Ilse Jacobsen (1–3); Jan Dal Lehrmann (4–7); Tommy Ahlers (1–3); Mia Wagner (4–7); Birgit Aaby (1–3); Peter Warnøe (4); Christian Stadil (1–4); Jesper Buch (1–8); Christian Arnstedt (5–8); Jacob Risgaard (5–8)	Season 1, 2015; Season 2, 2016; Season 3, 2018; Season 4, 2019; Season 5, 2019–2020; Season 6, 2021; Season 7, 2022; Season 8, 2023; Season 9, 2024
Egypt	Dragons' Den is El Mashroua	Alnahar	Hala Hattab; Hisham Al Jamal	Season 1, 2013
Finland	Leijonan kita ("Lion's Mouth")	MTV3	Kyösti Kakkonen; Eero Lehti; Toivo Sukari; Lisa Sounio; Kaija Ward	Season 1, 2007
Finland	Leijonan luola ("Lion's Den")	Nelonen	Riku Asikainen (1–2); Anne Berner (1); Ari Lahti (1–2); Jorma Terentjeff (1); Oskari Lehtonen (1); Miika Toivonen (2); Saga Forss (2); Kim Väisänen (2)	Season 1, 2013; Season 2, 2018
Finland	Leijonan luola Suomi ("Lion's Den Finland")	Nelonen	Current: Elias Aalto (1–2); Roni Bäck (2); Jenni Kynnös (1–2); Inka Mero (2); Kim Väisänen (1–2); Former: Noora Fagerström (1); Sami Hedberg (1); Jari Sarasvuo (1)	Season 1, 2023; Season 2, 2025
France	Qui veut être mon associé? ("Who wants to be my business partner?")	M6	Current: Delphine André (1–); Éric Larchevêque (1–); Marc Simoncini (1–); Anthony Bourbon (2–); Jean-Pierre Nadir (2–); Isabele Chevalier (3–); Former: Marc Vanhove (1); Frédéric Mazzella (1); Catherine Barba (1); Sophie Mechaly (2); Isabelle Weill (3)	Season 1, 2020; Season 2, 2022; Season 3, 2023
Germany	Die Höhle der Löwen ^{[de]} ("The Lions' Den")	VOX	Current: Judith Williams (1–13, 16–); Carsten Maschmeyer (3–); Ralf Dümmel (3–); Dagmar Wöhrl (4–); Nils Glagau (6–); Janna Ensthaler (13–); Tillman Schulz (13–); Tijen Onaran (14–); Former: Vural Öger (1–2); Lencke Wischhusen (1–2); Jochen Schweizer (1–3); Frank Thelen (1–7); Georg Kofler (4–12); Nico Rosberg (8–12)	Season 1, 2014; Season 2, 2015; Season 3, 2016; Season 4, 2017; Season 5, 2018; Season 6, 2019; Season 7, 2020; Season 8, 2020; Season 9, 2021; Season 10, 2021; Season 11, 2022; Season 12, 2022; Season 13, 2023; Season 14, 2023; Season 15, 2024; Season 16, 2024
Greece	Dragons' Den	ANT1 (Season 1-3); Skai TV (Season 4-)	Haris Vafias; Tasos Economou; Lily Perganda; Maria Hatzistefani; Leon Yohai; Nicky Goulimis; John Tsioris; Former: Paul Eformidis (1); Demetrios Mallios (2)	Season 1, 2022; Season 2, 2023; Season 3, 2025; Season 4, 2026
Hungary	Cápák között ("Among Sharks")^{[hu]}	RTL	Current: Levente Balogh (1–); Péter Balogh (1–); István Lakatos (3–5, 7–); Ilona Orbók (6–); Miklós Bojinka (8–); Ildikó Tóth (8–); Farbod Lotfi (8–); Péter Csillag (8–); György Wáberer (8–); Tamás Szauer (8–); Former: András Moldován (1–7); Gyula Fehér (1–2); Anna Apró (1); Szabina Tomán (2–5); Dr. Eszter Varga (6–7); Albert Sárospataki (7)	Season 1, 2019; Season 2, 2020; Season 3, 2021; Season 4, 2022; Season 5, 2023; Season 6, 2023; Season 7, 2024; Season 8, 2025
India	Shark Tank India	SET	Current: Anupam Mittal (1–); Namita Thapar (1–); Peyush Bansal (1–); Vineeta Singh (1–); Aman Gupta (1–); Azhar Iqubal (3–); Ritesh Agarwal (3–); Varun Dua (3–); Kunal Bahl (4–); Viraj Bahl (4–); Former: Ashneer Grover (1); Ghazal Alagh (1); Amit Jain (2–3); Deepinder Goyal (3); Radhika Gupta (3); Ronnie Screwala (3)	Season 1, 2021; Season 2, 2023; Season 3, 2024; Season 4, 2025
India (Tamil-language)	Startup Singam ஸ்டார்ட்அப் சிங்கம்	Star Vijay	Current: Suresh Ramanujam; Sriram Sankaram; Prem Barthasarathy; Ajesh Saklecha; Sathish Ganesan; Alex Pavan; Nirmal Jain; Anand Gupta; Dr. Gurushankar; Vedha Arun; Shailesh Haran; Surendra Golecha; Aravind Solamalai Pitchai; Sanjay Sethiya; Keerthy Suresh	Season 1, 2024
Ireland	Dragons' Den	RTÉ One	Niall O'Farrell (1–4); Peter Casey (5–6); Eamonn Quinn (6–7); Chanelle McEvoy (8); Bobby Kerr (1–4); Ramona Nicholas (5–6); Eleanor McEvoy (7–8); Sarah Newman (1–2); Norah Casey (3–4); Barry O'Sullivan (5–8); Allison Cowzer (7–8); Gavin Duffy (1–8); Seán Gallagher (1–3); Sean O'Sullivan (4–5)	Season 1, 2009; Season 2, 2010; Season 3, 2011; Season 4, 2012; Season 5, 2013; Season 6, 2014; Season 7, 2015; Season 8, 2017
Israel	Hakrishim ("The Sharks")^{[he]}	Channel 10 (1–2) Keshet 12 (3–)	Current: Amir Eyal (2, 5–); Dovvi Frances (3–); Zohar Levkovitz (3–); Oren Dobronsky (4–); Yasmin Luchach (4–); Former: Aviv Tzidon (1–2); Jacky Ben-Zaken (1–2); Zeev Holtzman (1); Isralea Shatir (1); Nir Shretzky (1); Oded Daseu (1); Yossi Moldawsky (2); Nir Barkat (2); Ronni Ross (2); Hadar Goldman (3); Stav Schachman (3); Enia Adivberar (3); Eldad Tamir (4)	Season 1, 2006; Season 2, 2007; Season 3, 2018; Season 4, 2020; Season 5, 2022; Season 6, 2023–2024
Italy	Shark Tank Italia^{[it]}	Italia 1	Luciano Bonetti; Fabio Cannavale; Gianpietro Vigorelli; Mariarita Costanza; Gianluca Dettori	Season 1, 2015
Japan	Manē no Tora ("Money Tigers")	Nippon TV	Various	Season 1, 2001; Season 2, 2002; Season 3, 2003; Season 4, 2004
Kenya	Lion's Den	NTV	Darshan Chandaria; Kris Senanu; Myke Rabar; Olive Gachara; Wandia Gichuru	Season 1, 2016
Lebanon	Dragons' Den: Al Aareen	Future TV	Omar El-Quqa; Ahmad Tantash; Nassif Karam; Roger Azar	Season 1, 2007
Lithuania	Rykliai Lietuva ("The Sharks Lithuania")	TV3	Current: Tadas Burgaila (1–); Dovilė Burgienė (1-); Robertas Dargis (1-); Einaras Gravrock (1–); Gediminas Kvietkauskas (1–); Toma Sabaliauskienė (2–); Viktorija Čijunskytė (2–)	Season 1, 2025; Season 2, 2025
Malta	Shark Tank Malta	TVM	Current: Mark Bajada (1–); Alexander Fenech (1–); Michael Bonello (1–); Dino Fino (2–); Kirsy Kullmann (3–); Former: Mark Weingard (1–2); Christabelle Camilleri (1–2)	Season 1, 2022; Season 2, 2023; Season 3, 2024
Mexico	Shark Tank Mexico^{[es]}	Sony Channel Latinoamerica	Current: Marcus Dantus (3–); Alejandra Ríos Spinola (6–); Marisa Lazo (6–); Alejandro Litchi (7–); Amaury Vergara (7–); Karla Berman (8–); Víctor González (9–); Simón Cohen (9–); Former: Rodrigo Herrera Aspra (1–6); Carlos Bremer (1–5); Arturo Elías Ayub (1–2, 4–6); Jorge Vergara (1–2); Ana Victoria García (1); Patricia Armendáriz (2–5); Luis Harvey (3–4); Braulio Arsuaga (7); Ernesto Coppel (7); Adriana Gallardo (8); Brian Requarth (8); Oswaldo Trava (8)	Season 1, 2016; Season 2, 2017; Season 3, 2018; Season 4, 2019; Season 5, 2020; Season 6, 2021; Season 7, 2022; Season 8, 2023; Season 9, 2024
Mongolia	Шарк танк Монгол ("Shark Tank Mongolia")	Mongol TV	Current: Anar Chinbaatar (3–); Tenuun Otgonbayar (3–); Punsalmaa Badamdorj (4–); Badral Dandar (3–); Batbaatar Tsogtbayar (4–); Former: Ariunbold Lkhagvajav (1); Tumengerel Sumiya (1); Tselmuun Nyamtaishir (1–2); Amartuvshin Ganibal (1–2); Oyungerel Janchiv (2); Enkhtuvshin Dashtseren (2–3); Munkhnasan Narmandakh (3)	Season 1, 2017; Season 2, 2019; Season 3, 2021; Season 4, 2023; Season 5, 2026
Nepal	Shark Tank Nepal	Himalaya TV	Anand Bagaria; Cabinet Shrestha; Hem Raj Dhakal; Ritu Singh Vaidya; Saurabh Jyoti	Season 1, 2025
Netherlands	Dragons' Den	Nederland 3 (1–2); NPO 1 (3–4); Viaplay (5–)	Current: Won Yip (3–); Pieter Schoen (3–); Shawn Harris (3–); Manon van Essen (5–); Bas Witvoet (5–); Former: Henk Keilman (1–2); Annemarie Van Gaal (1–2); Willem Sijthoff (1–2); Arjen De Koning (1–2); Jan Pieter Melchior (1); George Banken (2); Michel Perridon (3–4); Nikkie Plessen (3–4)	Season 1, 2007; Season 2, 2008; Season 3, 2020; Season 4, 2021; Season 5, 2022
New Zealand	Dragons' Den New Zealand	TV One	Julie Christie; Bob Jones; Annette Presley; Paul Webb; Barry Colman	Season 1, 2006
Nigeria	Dragons' Den	AIT Network	Prince Femi Tejuoso; Ibukun Awosika; Chris Parkes; Alexander Amosu; John Momoh; Tokunboh Ishmael	Season 1, 2008
Pakistan	Shark Tank Pakistan	Green TV	Faisal Aftab; Usman Bashir; Junaid Iqbal; Rabeel Warraich; Aleena Nadeem; Romanna Dada; Karim Teli	Season 1, 2024
Poland	Dragons' Den – jak zostać milionerem ("Dragon's Den – How to become a millionaire")	TV4	Maciej Kaczmarski (1–3); Marian Owerko (1–3); Anna Hejka (3); Andrzej Glowacki (3); Adam Kruszewski (3); Anna Garwolińska (1–2); Grzegorz Hajdarowicz (1–2); Krzysztof Golonka (1); Marek Rusiecki (2)	Season 1, Spring 2011; Season 2, Fall 2011; Season 3, Fall 2012
Portugal	Shark Tank^{[pt]}	SIC	Mário Ferreira; João Rafael Koehler; Susana Sequeira; Tim Vieira; Miguel Ribeiro Ferreira	Season 1, 2015; Season 2, 2016
Romania	Arena leilor ("Lions' Arena")	TVR 2	Carmen Săndulescu (1); Sorin Poșa (1); Gyorgy Baba (1–2); Marius Ghenea (1–7); Dragoș Anastasiu (1–7); Cristina Bâtlan (1–3, 5–6); Mirela Roșca (2); Radu Ioan Tudorache (2–3); Rucsandra Hurezeanu (4); Teodor Frolu (4); Micrea Tudor (4–6); Florin Talpeș (4–7); Mihaela Nicola (5–6); Orlando Szasz (7)	Season 1, 2007; Season 2, 2008; Season 3, 2009; Season 4, 2010; Season 5, 2011; Season 6, 2012; Season 7, 2013
Romania	Imperiul leilor ("Lions' Empire")	Pro TV	Daniela Mariscu (1); Cristian Onețiu (1); Monica Cadogan (1); Mohammad Murad (1–2); Dragos Petrescu (1–4); Bogdan Micu (2); Dan Șucu (2–4); Cristina Bâtlan (2–4); Sebastian Dobrincu (3); Wargha Enayati (3–4); Daniel Mischie (4); Felix Patrăşcanu (4); Răzvan Raţ (4); Mircea Căpăţînă (4)	Season 1, 2019; Season 2, 2020; Season 3, 2021; Season 4, 2023
Russia	Капитал ("Capital")	TNT	Andreï Korkounov; Evgeny Chichvarkin; Sergei Nedoroslev; Pavel Teplukhin; Nadezhda Kopytina	Season 1, 2006
Singapore	The Big Spark	CNA	Amit Gupta; Mustafa Kapasi; Ricky Kapur; Safdar Khan; Eric Lian; Ullrich Loeffler; Rebecca Martin; Mark Micallef; Ng Yeow Boon; Raagulan Pathy; Rhonda Wong	Season 1, 2023
Slovakia	Jama Levova ("The Lion Pit")	TV Markiza	Current: Igor Rattaj; Milan Dubec; Tatiana Ondrejkova; Separ; Štefan Rosina ml.; Former: Igor Kolla; Juraj Fehervari	Season 1, 2023; Season 2, 2024; Season 3, 2025
Slovenia	Dober posel ("Good deal")	Planet TV	Branko Drobnak; Borut Rismal; Daniela Bervar; Jure Mikuž; Matjaž Krč	Season 1, 2012
South Africa	Dragons' Den	Mzansi Magic	Lebo Gunguluza (1–2); Vusi Thembekwayo (1–2); Polo Leteka Radebe (1–2); Vinny Lingham (1–2); Gil Oved (1–2)	Season 1, 2014; Season 2, 2015
South Africa	Shark Tank South Africa	M-Net	Dawn Nathan-Jones; Vinny Lingham; Romeo Kumalo; Marnus Broodryk; Gil Oved	Season 1, 2016
Spain	Tu Oportunidad ("Your Opportunity")	TVE	María Eugenia Girón; Javier Pérez Dolset; Catalina Hoffmann; Gonzalo de la Cierva; Pablo Gimeno	Season 1, 2013
Sweden	Draknästet^{[sv}^{]} ("The Dragons' Nest")	SVT (1–2, 4–); TV8 (3)	Current: Lena Apler (4–); Sara Wimmercranz (4–); Shervin Razani (4–); Jonas Tellander (6–); Fredrik Eklund (6–); Ash Pournouri (6–); Hannah Widell (6–); Christian von Koenigsegg (6–); Former: Mats Gabrielsson (1–2); Ljubo Mrnjavac (1); Gunilla von Platen (1); Sven Hagströmer (1–2); Richard Båge (1–2); Douglas Roos (2); Susanna Falkengren (2); Dani Evanoff (3); Anne Berner (3); Anders Holm (3); Lars Wingefors (3); Olle Nordberg (3); Jacob de Geer (4–5); Jonas Eriksson (4–5)	Season 1, 2009; Season 2, 2010; Season 3, 2014; Season 4, 2021; Season 5, 2022; Season 6, 2023
Switzerland	Die Höhle der Löwen Schweiz ("Lion's Den Switzerland")	TV24 (1–2); 3 Plus (3–)	Current: Tobias Reichmuth (1–); Bettina Hein (1–); Roland Brack (1–); Anja Graf (1–); Jürg Schwarzenbach (3–); Lukas Speiser (3–); Patrick Mollet (3–); Former: Jürg Marquard (1–2); DJ Antoine (2)	Season 1, 2019; Season 2, 2020; Season 3, 2021; Season 4, 2022
Thailand	Shark Tank Thailand	Channel 7	Current: Natavudh Pungcharoenpong (1–); Krit Srichawla (1–); Bhurit Bhirombhakdi (2–); Chanapan Juangroongruan (3–); Prapol Milintachinda (3–); Former: Shannon Kalayanamitr (1); Chalermchai Mahagitsiri (1); Bodintorn Juangroongruangkit (2); Nishita Shah (1); Jakkaphong Jakrajutatip (2); Rawit Harnausanha (1)	Season 1, 2019; Season 2, 2020; Season 3, 2022
Trinidad and Tobago	Planting Seeds	CNC3	Joseph Rahael; Racquel Moses; Joe Pires; Sheldon Stephen	Season 1, 2016; Season 2, 2017; Season 3, 2018; Season 4, 2019
Turkey	Dragons' Den Türkiye	Bloomberg HT	Baybars Altuntaş; Yalçın Ayaydın; Nevzat Aydın; Gamze Cizreli; Alphan Manas	Season 1, 2010
Ukraine	Акули бізнесу ("Business Sharks")	ICTV	Olha Hutzal; Volodymyr Kolodyuk; Evhen Chernyak; Oleksandr Kartakov; Andriy Zadorozhnyy	Season 1, 2006; Season 2, 2006; Season 3, 2007; Season 4, 2007; Season 5, 2007
United Arab Emirates	Shark Tank Dubai	Dubai One	Faisal Juma Belhoul; Amira Sajwani; Elie Khouri; Noor Sweid; Yousef Hamad	Season 1, 2023–2024; Season 2, 2024
United Kingdom	Dragons' Den	BBC Two (1–17); BBC One (18–)	Current: Peter Jones (1–); Deborah Meaden (3–); Touker Suleyman (13–); Steven Bartlett (19–); Former: Simon Woodroffe (1); Doug Richard (1–2); Duncan Bannatyne (1–12); Rachel Elnaugh (1–2); Richard Farleigh (3–4); James Caan (5–8); Hilary Devey (9–10); Kelly Hoppen (11–12); Sarah Willingham (13–14); Jenny Campbell (15–16); Theo Paphitis (2–10, 17–18); Piers Linney (11–12); Nick Jenkins (13–14); Tej Lalvani (15–18); Sara Davies (17–22)	Season 1, 2005; Season 2, 2005; Season 3, 2006; Season 4, 2007; Season 5, 2007; Season 6, 2008; Season 7, 2009; Season 8, 2010; Season 9, 2011; Season 10, 2012; Season 11, 2013; Season 12, 2014; Season 13, 2015; Season 14, 2016; Season 15, 2017; Season 16, 2018; Season 17, 2019; Season 18, 2021; Season 19, 2022; Season 20, 2023; Season 21, 2024; Season 22, 2025
United States	Shark Tank	ABC	Current: Robert Herjavec (1–); Barbara Corcoran (1–); Kevin O'Leary (1–); Daymond John (1–); Lori Greiner (4–); Daniel Lubetzky (16–); Former: Kevin Harrington (1–2); Mark Cuban (3–16)	Season 1, 2009; Season 2, 2011; Season 3, 2012; Season 4, 2012; Season 5, 2013; Season 6, 2014; Season 7, 2015; Season 8, 2016; Season 9, 2017; Season 10, 2018; Season 11, 2019; Season 12, 2020; Season 13, 2021; Season 14, 2022; Season 15, 2023; Season 16, 2024
Vietnam	Khởi nghiệp ("Start-up")	VTV3	Unknown	2005–2006
Vietnam	Shark Tank Vietnam – Thương vụ bạc tỷ^{[vi]}	VTV3	Phạm Thanh Hưng (1–5, 7); Nguyễn Hòa Bình (4–7); Bùi Quang Minh (7); Trần Anh Vương (1); Nguyễn Mạnh Dũng (2–3); Nguyễn Thanh Việt (3); Nguyễn Xuân Phú (1–2, 4); Đỗ Thị Kim Liên (3–5); Lê Hùng Anh (6); Lê Hàn Tuệ Lâm (6)	Season 1, 2017; Season 2, 2018; Season 3, 2019; Season 4, 2020; Season 5, 2022; Season 6, 2023; Season 7, 2024
Vietnam	Kiddle Shark - Sếp nhí khởi nghiệp (Kids version)	VTV3	Xuân Bắc; Đoan Trang; Ngô Kiến Huy; Midu; Minh Hằng	2019

== See also ==
- American Inventor
- Ath Pavura
- Fortune: Million Pound Giveaway
- MoneyHunt
- Redemption Inc.
- The Big Idea
- The Profit
- Win in China
