= Leijonan luola Suomi =

Finnish TV series

- Genre: Reality television
- Based on: Shark Tank
- Starring: Kim Väisänen; Noora Fagerström; Jenni Kynnös; Jari Sarasvuo; Elias Aalto; Sami Hedberg; Inka Mero; Roni Bäck
- Country of origin: Finland
- Original language: Finnish
- No. of seasons: 1
- No. of episodes: 8

Production
- Camera setup: Multiple-camera
- Running time: 60 minutes
- Production company: Yellow Film & TV

Original release
- Network: Nelonen; Ruutu
- Release: 11 September 2023 – present

Leijonan luola Suomi (English: Lion's Den Finland) is a Finnish version of American business reality TV show Shark Tank, based on the Dragons' Den format.

The first season began to air on 11 September 2023 on Nelonen channel and Ruutu, and the second season in February 2025.

It is the third Finnish adaptation of the format, after Leijonan kita (Lion's Mouth) in 2007 and Leijonan luola (Lion's Den) in 2013–2018.

== Concept ==
The show features a panel of potential investors, termed as "Lions", who listen to entrepreneurs' pitch ideas for a business or product they wish to develop. These multi-millionaires judge the concepts and products pitched and then decide whether they invest their money to help market and mentor each contestant. The entrepreneurs have only half an hour to convince the "Lions" that it is profitable to invest to this company.

== Lions ==
Six big Finnish entrepreneurs are ready to invest their own money for hopeful companies and help them to grow.

For the second season, two new Lions; Inka Mero and Roni Bäck joined the cast, while Noora Fagerström, Jari Sarasvuo and Sami Hedberg exited.

Lion	Company
Kim Väisänen	Co-founder and CEO of Blancco Ltd.
Noora Fagerström	Co-founder of Jungle Juice Bar
Jenni Kynnös	Founder and CEO of Moretime and MySome
Jari Sarasvuo	Founder and chairman of Trainers' House
Elias Aalto	Co-founder and adviser of Wolt
Sami Hedberg	Founder of Hedberg Live Ltd. and co-owner of Helsinki Seagulls
Inka Mero	Founder and CEO of Voima Ventures
Roni Bäck	CEO and owner of Backmedia Ltd.

The timeline of the Lions

Lion	Season 1 (2023)	Season 2 (2025)
Jari Sarasvuo	Main	
Jenni Kynnös	Main	
Kim Väisänen	Main	
Noora Fagerström	Main	
Elias Aalto	Main	
Sami Hedberg	Main	
Inka Mero		Main
Roni Bäck		Main

== Episodes ==
=== Season 1 (2023) ===
No.	Title	Original release date	Viewers
1	"The Strangest Decision Ever"	11 September 2023	167,000
Lions: Sami Hedberg, Elias Aalto, Kim Väisänen, Jenni Kynnös, Jari Sarasvuo The world's most famous business program returns in Finland! This time five of the Lions face stretching shoelaces, intelligent balls, farming boxes bringing life content and too delicious vegetable food.
2	"I'm Not Going to Negotiate With These Men"	18 September 2023	158,000
Lions: Noora Fagerström, Elias, Kim, Jenni, Jari Serial achievers and serial losers meet in the den, as the Lions get to know the side streams of beer, gentle tights, giving help and the band-aid of the future.
3	"In My Heart, The World Doesn't Need This"	25 September 2023	121,000
Lions: Noora, Elias, Kim, Jenni, Jari Lion Jenni finds her way into other people's wallets again, when new entrepreneurs step in front of the lion pack. Today, the lions get to see how barcodes are put to work, elderly people can be monitored, newspapers can be listened to, and how children can rule the world.
4	"Is This a Big Deal?"	2 October 2023	127,000
Lions: Sami, Elias, Kim, Jenni, Jari Four new entrepreneurs are put in front of a critical lion pack. This time, the floor of the den is occupied by sausage machines for dogs, legendary bags, Korean skin care and the car wash of the future.
5	"The Hug of the Losers"	9 October 2023	113,000
Lions: Noora/Sami, Elias, Kim, Jenni, Jari The new entrepreneurs arrive in the den. Today, the lion pack gets to know the future of renovation, saving the care industry, moving walls and a flood of gifts.
6	"Now Something Magical Has to Happen"	16 October 2023	N/A
Lions: Sami, Elias, Kim, Jenni, Jari A lion pack consisting of psychics and eternal students gather in the cave when new entrepreneurs arrive to seek investors for their company. This time there are empathic tapping, individual coaching, bull bean treats and genital candles in offer.
7	"This Is Future"	23 October 2023	N/A
Lions: Noora, Elias, Kim, Jenni, Jari The lions are on edge of their seats, when the future arrives at the den. New entrepreneurs step in front of a pack of lions to present innovations with a new-age pole vault, a wind turbine on a detached house, clothing store technology and a gym aimed at young people.
8	"This Is The Moment of Payment"	23 October 2023	N/A
Lions: Noora, Elias, Kim, Jenni, Jari The Season finale. The last entrepreneurs enter the den to present the lions some fresh snacks, huggable trees, nature-saving mugs and online flea guards.

=== Season 2 (2025) ===
No.	Title	Original release date	Viewers
1	TBA	February 2025	TBD
Lions: Elias, Jenni, Kim, Roni Bäck, Inka Mero
