= LPK =

LPK can refer to:

- Lipetsk Airport, Lipetsk, Russia (IATA code)
- Libby, Perszyk, Kathman Inc., brand design agency, founded 1983
- Lithuanian Confederation of Industrialists (LPK in Lithuanian acronym), lobby group founded in 1989
- Mazingira Green Party of Kenya, formerly known as the Liberal Party of Kenya
- People's Movement of Kosovo (LPK in Albanian acronym), Kosovar political party
- Pyruvate kinase, liver-specific
