= Sarasvuo =

Sarasvuo is a surname. Notable people with the surname include:

- Jari Sarasvuo (born 1965), Finnish businessman
- Virpi Sarasvuo (born 1976), Finnish cross-country skier
