= Liisa Hallamaa =

Finnish ceramist (1925–2008)

- Born: Liisa Kaarina Hallamaa; 17 October 1925; Helsinki, Finland
- Died: 28 January 2008 (aged 82); Rauma, Satakunta, Finland
- Education: Central School of Art and Industry
- Known for: Ceramics
- Spouse: Sverre Larsen (m. 1949, div. 1950)
- Children: 3

Liisa Kaarina Hallamaa (17 October 1925 – 28 January 2008) was a Finnish ceramist.

== Biography ==
Hallamaa was born on 17 October 1925 in Helsinki, Finland.

Hallamaa graduated from the ceramics department of the Central School of Art and Industry (now part of the Aalto University) in 1949. She worked for the Finnish ceramics company Arabia as a student. She also worked as an assistant to Finnish ceramicist Aune Siimes.

In 1949, Hallamaa married the Norwegian painter Sverre Larsen and moved to Rogaland, Norway, where she worked as a pottery designer in Stavanger. They had a daughter, Marjatta Airas [fi], who became a mezzosopraano singer. Hallamaa and Larsen divorced in 1950 and she returned to Finland. She later remarried and had another two children.

Hallamaa exhibited at the French Exposition internationale de céramique contemporaine in 1965.

In 1974 Hallamaa founded Alamaan Ceramics in Mikkeli, South Savo, Finland. In the 1980s, she moved to Perniö in Western Finland where she produced floral themed wall reliefs.

Hallamaa was known for her skill in the application of ceramic glazes and for creating tall and narrow-mouthed water pots, goblets and platters.

Ceramic pieces by Hallamaa are held in the collections of the Architecture and Design Museum in Helsinki; the Museum Boijmans Van Beuningen in Rotterdam, South Holland, The Netherlands; the Museum of New Zealand Te Papa Tongarewa in Wellington, New Zealand; and the Birmingham Museum of Art in Birmingham, Alabama, United States. Finnish businessman and art collector Kyösti Kakkonen also owns plates by Hallama, which have been on permanent display at the Espoo Museum of Modern Art (EMMA) in Espoo, Uusimaa, Finland from 2022.

Hallamaa died on 28 January 2008 in Rauma, Satakunta, Finland, aged 82.
