= Harsha Purasinghe =

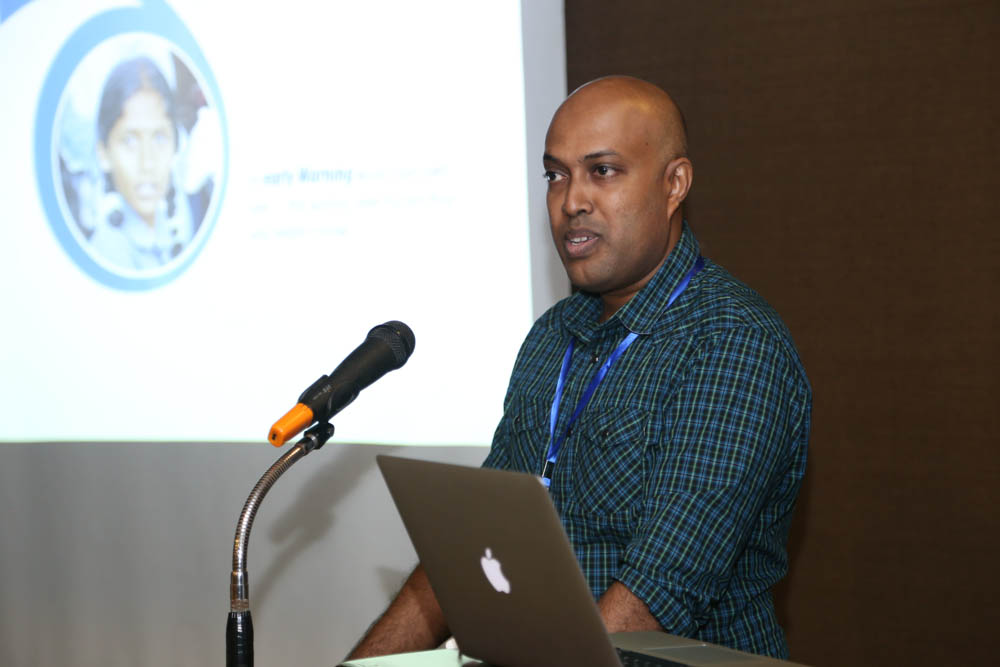
- Purasinghe at an event in 2014.
- Born: Sri Lanka
- Education: Ananda College
- Occupation: Entrepreneur
- Known for: Founder of Microimage and MiHCM; Director at ICTA
- Title: CEO of MiHCM
- Awards: Eisenhower Fellow (2014)
- Website: mihcm.com

Harsha Purasinghe is a Sri Lankan technology entrepreneur. He founded human resource and broadcast automation companies Microimage and MiHCM.

Following the 2004 Indian Ocean earthquake and tsunami Purasinghe along with others developed Disaster and Emergency Warning Network (DEWN) as a GSM-based early warning system to alert public of impending disasters. He was selected as an Eisenhower Fellow in 2014.

He was a member of the Board of Directors of the Information and Communication Technology Agency of Sri Lanka (ICTA) from 2024 to 2025.

== Early life and education ==
Purasinghe studied at Ananda College Colombo. While still in school, Purasinghe formed "The Microimage Hobbyists Club" in 1992 with four other schoolmates who were into computing.

Purasinghe's appetite for computing started when he played games with his neighbour on his neighbour's Commodore 64. He says he "pestered his father" for a computer for himself and was bought a 'home computer' with 16KB of memory. He then upgraded to an Apple II compatible and started programming in Pascal. His next computer was a IBM Personal Computer XT with the Intel 8088 running at 4.77Mhz, 512KB of memory, and for the first time - storage in the means of a floppy disk.

In addition to games and small utilities, the club developed the first WIndows 3.1 compatible Sinhala font and input manipulation software in 1994, showcasing it at Sri Lanka's annual tech exhibition Infotel that year.

== Career ==
=== Microimage ===
The group set up Microimage as a company in 1995, initially working on local language software products. Purasinghe is the current Group Chief Executive Officer of Microimage, which operates in 20 countries and a branch network in Malaysia, Singapore, Bangladesh, and Pakistan.

=== MiHCM ===
In 1995, Microimage founded MIHCM as an offshoot as a company that developed human resources management software. MiHCM moved their SaaS system to the cloud in 2014 (later to be completely overhauled in 2017) . MiCHM would go on to set up its first regional operations, in Malaysia, in 2014.

=== Futura Tech Labs ===
In 2007, they launched Microimage Mobile Media (currently known as Futura Tech Labs) as another offshoot, focusing on media broadcasting and streaming music services. They also co-created Disaster and Emergency Warning Network (DEWN) as a hyper-localised tool to warn the public of emergencies.

=== WSO2Mobile ===
In 2013, Purasinghe co-founded WSO2Mobile, a subsidiary of the open-source middleware company WSO2. He served as CEO of the subsidiary, which focused on enterprise mobile management, until it was reabsorbed into the parent company in 2014.

=== Public Policy ===
In November 2024, Purasinghe was appointed to the Board of Directors of the Information and Communication Technology Agency of Sri Lanka (ICTA), although he resigned the year after. He was made a member of the AI Advisory Committee in February 2025 by the Sri Lankan government.

== Social impact ==
Following the 2004 tsunami, Purasinghe led the technical development of the Disaster & Emergency Warning Network (DEWN). The system was a collaboration between Microimage, Dialog Axiata, and the University of Moratuwa, designed to disseminate early warnings via GSM technology. The system was officially handed over to Sri Lanka's Ministry of Disaster Management in 2009.

Since 2019, Purasinghe served as a director at the Lanka Impact Investing Network (LIIN), an organization supporting social enterprises in Sri Lanka. He is also an impact investor host on Ath Pawura, a Sri Lankan reality TV series similar to Shark Tank.

== Awards and recognition ==
- Most Innovative Mobile Application or Content
- Overall Best Product Gold for Software Innovation for 2005
- Most Outstanding Entrepreneur in the ICT/BPO Industry (2007)
- 40 Under 40 Business Leaders, Echelon Magazine (2013)
- Eisenhower Fellowship (2014)
