= Marja Tiura =

Finnish former Member of Parliament

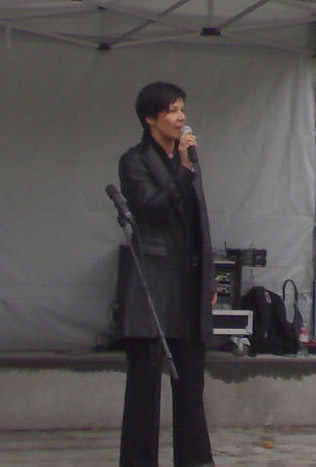
Marja Tiura speaking in Tampere in 2006.

Marja Johanna Tiura (born 20 August 1969 in Kylmäkoski, Finland) is a Finnish former Member of Parliament representing the National Coalition Party. She was first elected to parliament for the Pirkanmaa region in the 1999 general election, and retained her seat in the 2003 and 2007 elections. She lost her seat in the 2011 general election. She has also served as a locally elected politician on the Tampere Municipal Authority from 2000 to 2008. She was local party secretary from 1996 to 1999. Tiura has made headlines in Finland in 2009 and 2010 for coming under parliamentary and police investigation for allegedly taking bribes from significant business enterprises led by Kyösti Kakkonen of the KMS Group and Arto Merisalo of the Nova Group. The accusation is that she received this money so that she would become an undeclared lobbyist for their own business concerns. In the end the accusations did not lead to charges.

== Education ==
Tiura graduated from New Braunfels High School, New Braunfels, Texas, USA, in 1987, and from Toijala High School in 1989. She graduated from Tampere Business College, where she studied business and administration, in 1992. She studied public relations at Päivölä Training College in 1996 and completed a master's degree in business administration at the University of Tampere in 1999.

== Political career ==
Under the Finnish electoral system of proportional representation, Tiura was elected to the Finnish parliament in the 1999 General election with 5288 votes. In the 2003 General election, she received 10,686 votes and in the 2007 General election 17,577 votes, which was the highest number of votes for any candidate in the Pirkanmaa electoral region, the fourth highest in the entire country, and the highest garnered by a female candidate. Regardless of the voter popularity, Tiura was not chosen in the ministerial negotiations between the coalition members of the incoming government to receive a ministerial portfolio, on the grounds that despite popular public support she is considered a political lightweight who is unable to work with others, pointing, for instance, to her high turnover of parliamentary assistants.

In 2007-2011 Tiura worked in the parliament as the first deputy chairman of the National Coalition Party's parliamentary group and chairman of the Committee on Future. She was also a member of the finance committee.

Tiura was not re-elected in the 2011 election.

== Critique ==
The influence of the organization Kehittyvien maakuntien Suomi KMS (Sustainable municipalities Finland) in giving money to Finnish politicians in their electoral campaigns during the 2007 general election has since the elections led to both parliamentary and police investigations. It emerged that Tiura received 20,000 euros. Campaign support money for Tiura had been raised by a support group (the 'MJT club'), founded by Tampere business consultant Eila Saviaro, raising 34,000 euros. The KMS, through the Nova Group, had given her 4880 euros to pay for newspaper campaign advertisements.

The Nova Group also donated in 2008 21,000 euros to a private school, Anna Tapion koulu, in Aitoo, a village in the municipality of Pälkäne, in which Tiura is the deputy chairman of its governing board. Furthermore, it emerged that the Nova Group had offered 4.2 million euros to the school to cover repairs to their buildings. The newspaper Aamulehti discovered that Tiura's election campaign manager had renewed the school's webpages significantly reducing the sum of money that had been donated to the school.

In September 2009 Tiura returned to both the Nova Group and the MJT Club money she had received from them. However, the Nova Group's former director, Arto Merisalo, then informed the newspaper Iltalehti that they had also paid for Tiura's flight tickets for a journey to Thailand in 2009, as well as paid for furniture for her personal use.

In March 2010 Tiura told in an interview in the magazine Apu that the party secretary of the Centre Party, Jarmo Korhonen, had tried to get her to defect to the Centre Party after the 2007 elections. Korhonen replied that in fact Tiura herself had initiated the contact, a statement backed up by Merisalo.
