= Semenzato =

Semenzato is a surname and may refer to:

- Fabio Semenzato (born Treviso, 6 May 1986), Italian rugby union player who plays as a scrum-half for Benetton
- Daniel Semenzato (born 11 January 1987), Italian footballer who plays for Bassano
- José Carlos Semenzato (born 23 March 1968), Brazilian businessman and entrepreneur, founder and president of Microlins
