= Microlins =

Microlins is a Brazilian educational franchise chain, the second largest of its kind in the country, with almost 700 schools in more than 500 cities, and almost half a million students (data of June 2007). Founded in the city of Lins by young entrepreneur José Carlos Semenzato, Microlins started as a single small computer training school, in 1990. After a rapid expansion, with branches in several surrounding cities, the company transformed itself into a franchise chain and created many new courses.

Microlins belongs to a holding company, FranHolding, presided also by Semenzato, which owns also other franchise chains, such as Instituto Embelleze, NumberOne Idiomas, ProfSat, and others.
