= ProfSat =

ProfSat Tecnologia e Educação Limitada was a Brazilian private company which specialized in professional education and preparatory courses using satellite video streaming technologies. It was conceived by Dr. Renato M.E. Sabbatini and collaborators from the Edumed Institute of Campinas, state of São Paulo in 2004, and established as one of the companies in the FranHolding franchise holding created by entrepreneur José Carlos Semenzato. It was jointly owned by Universidade de Uberaba, a private university from the city of Uberaba, state of Minas Gerais. The company was terminated in 2008, after the acquisition of Microlins, the parent company, by the Anhanguera Educacional group.
