= Fikr wa Talash =

- Genre: Reality show
- Created by: Anna Elliot
- Based on: Tigers of Money
- Presented by: Ramiz Baktiar
- Country of origin: Afghanistan
- Original language: Dari

Production
- Producer: NGO Bamyan Media
- Production locations: Kabul, Afghanistan
- Running time: 1 hour

Original release
- Network: TOLO TV
- Release: 2008 – 2014

Fikr wa Talash is an Afghan television programme, presented by Ramiz Baktiar. The format of the show is owned by Sony Pictures Television and is based on the original Japanese programme, Tigers of Money, which has been adapted into the Dragons Den/Shark Tank franchise. The programme was produced by NGO Bamyan Media. The show premiered on TOLO TV in 2008, after the success of Afghan Star, a reality television programme.

The show's name, Fikr wa Talash, translates to Dream and Achieve in English. The show's purpose was to encourage Afghans to embark on entrepreneurship. It aimed to promote entrepreneurial spirit among ordinary Afghans, with the show giving contestants a lifetime opportunity to pitch their creative business ideas before a panel of business tycoons and walk away with the cash prize of US$20,000.

== Format ==
After a casting period, 20 candidates presented their business projects to a jury of Afghan experts and entrepreneurs. The jury and viewers were invited to vote each week to eliminate the candidates. In the final, there were five contestants, with the winner and runner-up receiving varying cash prizes to support their business projects, campaigning to the Afghan expert jury.

The show was produced by Bamyan Media with the help of the Moby Group's strategic communications arm, Lapis Ltd, and aired on the Group's most popular channel in Afghanistan, TOLO TV, reaching an estimated 7 million viewers in 2010.

Fikr wa Talash was sponsored by USAID, Roshan telecommunication (the country's leading mobile operator) and Bank e Milli (Afghan National Bank). The host was Ramiz Baktiar. It was created by TOLO TV.

== Seasons ==
=== Season 1 ===
The first series ended in August 2008, with the final contestant, Faizulhaq Moshkani, winning $20,000 towards his plastic recycling business. At the time of the show, he owned a plastic recycling plant in Qandahar in southern Afghanistan. After winning, Moshkani shut the factory due to the high cost of fuel to power generators. Instead, he used the $20,000 prize money to move the business to Kabul, where he planned to build a mini hydroelectric plant to power the new recycling factory. Mariam Al Ahmadi, collected the runner-up prize of $10,000.

=== Season 2 ===
In the second season, a follow-up episode was introduced with the top contestants tracking their progress in their businesses.

== See also ==
- Mass media in Afghanistan
- Television in Afghanistan
