= Ralf Dümmel =

German entrepreneur

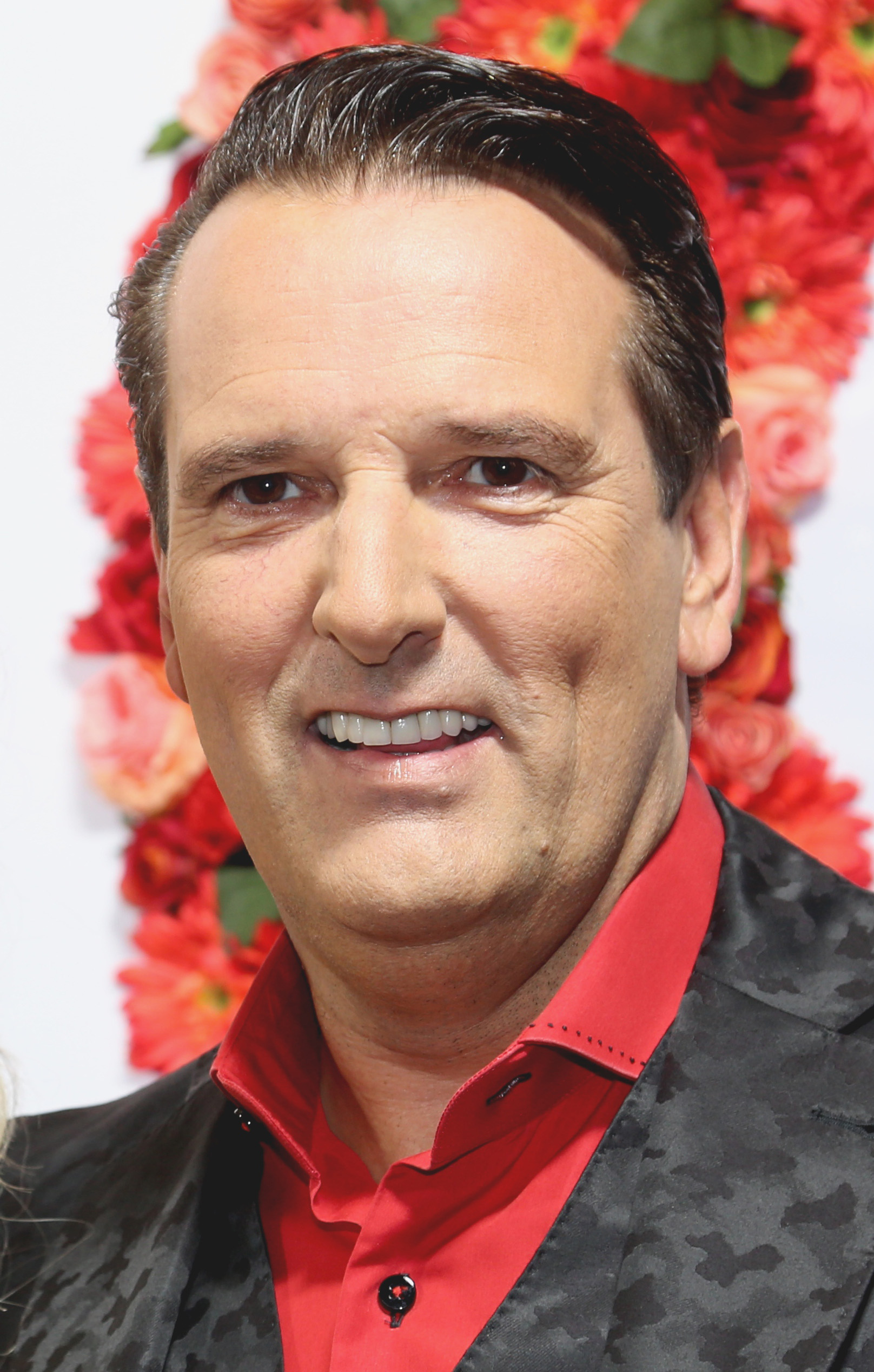
Dümmel in 2017

Ralf Dümmel (born 2 December 1966) is a German entrepreneur, managing director of the family business DS Produkte and investor in the VOX founder show Die Höhle der Löwen.

== Biography ==
Dümmel was born in Bad Segeberg, Schleswig-Holstein. In 1988, he joined DS Produkte as a sales assistant. The company was founded in June 1973 and Dümmel was made partner in 1996. In 2000, he was appointed managing director. Under his management, the company became a global player. Subsidiaries were established in Poland, Hong Kong and elsewhere. In 2015, he was also a member of the supervisory board at VfB Lübeck.

As a soccer referee, he made it as far as the C squad of the DFB, but ended this for professional reasons.

Dümmel has been in a relationship with TV presenter Anna Heesch since 2013.

In 2016, he became one of the investors in German TV channel VOX's start-up show Die Höhle der Löwen, during which he has invested in more than 85 start-ups and supported more than 150 founders.
