= Redemption Inc. =

- Created by: Wide Eyed Entertainment and Formatfreak Ltd.
- Starring: Kevin O'Leary
- Country of origin: Canada
- Original language: English
- No. of seasons: 1
- No. of episodes: 9

Production
- Producer: Cathie James
- Running time: 60 minutes
- Production company: Proper Television

Original release
- Network: CBC
- Release: January 9 – March 9, 2012

Redemption Inc. (also known as Redemption Inc. with Kevin O'Leary) is a nine-part Canadian reality television game show hosted by business commentator Kevin O'Leary, broadcast on CBC, produced by Proper Television. The show stars 10 ex-cons, from cocaine dealers to fraud artists, in an elimination-style competition that results in the winner earning $100,000 of O'Leary's money to launch their own business.

== Format ==
On Redemption Inc., every week the contestants are plunged into another business, in order to prove themselves to the business manager and O'Leary himself. O'Leary assigns a team leader (or multiple team leaders) and they are given a business task that they are to meet. Often there will be a training day followed by the business day.

Eliminations proceed as thus: All contestants come into the studio to discuss the pros and cons of the business challenge, and then Kevin selects players to stay behind with him and those players make their case to stay. Finally, Kevin offers someone an exit package, to start up their own business. The exit package does not have to be taken; however, the package cannot be offered again.

The contestants were:

| Name | Age | Hometown |
|---|---|---|
| Aaron | 33 | Nanaimo, BC |
| Adam | 35 | Toronto, ON |
| Alia | 26 | Prince George, BC |
| Brian | 26 | Ottawa, ON |
| Jeff | 39 | Petawawa, ON |
| Joseph | 52 | Toronto, ON |
| Leslie | 39 | Campbell River, BC |
| Nicole | 29 | Toronto, ON |
| Ryan | 41 | Vancouver, BC |
| Samuel | 28 | Toronto, ON |

== Elimination Table ==
= Winner of the show
= Runners-up of the show and left with a consolation package
= Designated leader or co-leader in challenge
= Ranked low in performance
= Designated leader or co-leader in challenge and ranked low in challenge
= Accepted the exit package and left
= Declined the exit package and stayed
= Forced to accept exit package and leave
= Quit the show

| Episode #: | 1 | 2 | 3 | 4 | 5 | 6 | 7 | 8 |
| Contestant | Results | | | | | | | |
|---|---|---|---|---|---|---|---|---|
| Alia | LOW | IN | IN | IN | IN | IN | IN | WINNER |
| Brian | LOW | IN | IN | IN | IN | IN | LOW | Runner-Up |
| Samuel | IN | IN | IN | IN | IN | IN | IN | Runner-Up |
| Jeff | IN | IN | IN | IN | IN | IN | OUT | |
| Adam | IN | IN | IN | IN | LOW | OUT | | |
| Joseph | IN | IN | IN | IN | QUIT | | | |
| Ryan | IN | LOW | IN | OUT | | | | |
| Leslie | IN | LOW | OUT^{1} | | | | | |
| Aaron | LOW | OUT | | | | | | |
| Nicole | OUT | | | | | | | |

^1Leslie was designated as the team leader for this task.

=== Reasons for Elimination ===
- Nicole: Gave too many excuses, Kevin felt she didn't participate in the challenge as much as her fellow participants. She also crashed a car.
- Aaron: His fellow participants had many problems with his attitude, and found him hard to work with.
- Leslie: As leader, his fellow participants had many problems with his attitude, and didn't respect his leadership.
- Ryan: Failed to show up to challenge and failed to give any reason why. In the boardroom he gave excuses that nobody, including Kevin, believed. In the end Ryan was forced to leave with his exit package, he was not given the opportunity to turn it down and remain in the game.
- Joseph: Even though Joseph was asked to stay behind, Kevin gave him another chance. However, after Adam revealed his decision to stay Joseph told everyone he couldn't handle the competition anymore (saying it was like when he was incarcerated) and quit.
- Adam: Was named leader in episode 5, and was ranked low in performance. He chose to stay on. In episode 6, he was successful at selling art, but was viewed unfavorably by the store owners and fellow competitors. Despite declining an exit package before, Kevin decided to give half of the previous package to Adam. However, he was forced to take it and leave.
- Jeff: Made the least amount in profits. Expenses made the difference in the assessment of performance.
- Brian and Samuel: Challengers were given the opportunity to present a business plan to a panel of business people, and Alia was declared the winner. Brian and Samuel received consolation packages.

== Viewership ratings ==
2012 season
| Episode | 01 | 02 | 03 | 04 | 05 | 06 | 07 | 08 | 09 |
|---|---|---|---|---|---|---|---|---|---|
| Date | 2012-01-09 | 2012-01-16 | 2012-01-23 | 2012-01-30 | 2012-02-06 | 2012-02-13 | 2012-02-20 | 2012-02-27 | 2012-03-05 |
| Viewers | 789,000 | 600,000 | 536,000 | 504,000 | 438,000 | 457,000 | 526,000 | 543,000 | 672,000 |

== See also ==
- American Inventor
- The Big Idea
- Fortune: Million Pound Giveaway
- Win in China
- The Profit
- Shark Tank
- Dragons' Den
