= Shark Tank Pakistan =

Pakistani business reality television series

- Genre: Reality television
- Based on: Shark Tank
- Directed by: Usman Malik
- Presented by: Rabab Hashim
- Starring: see below
- Country of origin: Pakistan
- Original language: Urdu
- No. of seasons: 1
- No. of episodes: 11

Production
- Producer: Grenlit Studios
- Production locations: Karachi, Sindh
- Camera setup: Multiple-camera
- Running time: 60 minutes

Original release
- Network: Green Entertainment; Myco
- Release: 3 November 2024 – present

Related
- Shark Tank

Shark Tank Pakistan is a Pakistani Urdu-language business reality television series that airs on Green TV Entertainment produced by Grenlit Studios. The show is the Pakistani franchise of the American show Shark Tank, which is originally from Japanese television show The Tigers of Money (Japanese: マネーの虎, romanized: manē no tora).

== Sharks ==
Shark	Company
Aleena Nadeem	CEO & Founder EduFi, Pakistan's first Study Now, Pay Later program
Faisal Aftab	Founder, CEO & General Partner, Zayn.VC
Junaid Iqbal	Founder and CEO, Salt Ventures
Karim Teli	Managing Director, Igloo Pakistan
Rabeel Warraich	Founder and CEO, Sarmayacar
Romanna Dada	Founding Partner, Women Collective
Usman Bashir	CEO, BrakeTime
