= Trideca =

- Formerly: Appscore
- Company type: Proprietary limited company
- Industry: Technology
- Founded: 2010
- Founder: Nick Bell and Alex Louey
- Headquarters: Melbourne, Australia
- Number of employees: 100+ (2016)
- Website: trideca.com.au

Trideca (formerly Appscore) is an Australian-based digital agency specializing in mobile application development for iOS, Android and Windows platforms founded. Trideca has built over 600 apps for a number of companies such as Telstra, NAB, and ANZ.

== History ==
Trideca was founded by Nick Bell and Alex Louey in 2010. The basis for establishing the company was to cater for Australia's growing demand for custom mobile services. During the first three years of business, Louey didn't take a salary; instead choosing to pour all profit made back into the company. In May 2016, Trideca and WME expanded their workforce in Melbourne as a centre for technology and innovation.

Trideca has more than 100 employees and currently brings in an annual turnover of $15 million, with projections that figure will increase to $25 million for 2017.

The company is driven by Alex Louey. Trideca partnership with Telstra in 2014. Company also works with global names such as Nestle, Mercedes-Benz, Apple Inc., Samsung, Microsoft and BP.

== Awards ==
- Winner of the Gold Stevie Award 2016 in the ‘Innovation in Business Utility App’ Category
