= Heinrich Stefan Prokop =

Austrian entrepreneur

Heinrich Prokop
- Born: Heinrich Stefan Prokop; 1962 (age 63–64); Vienna
- Occupations: Entrepreneur, Venture capitalist
- Spouse: Brigitte Fruehwirth-Prokop
- Children: 1

Heinrich Stefan Prokop (born 1962) is an Austrian entrepreneur and venture investor. He is known for his investments in Fast-moving consumer goods startup companies. He has held several roles in the cereal and snack industry and is the founding partner of the startup accelerator Clever Clover (based in Amsterdam). He served as a panel member on 2 Minuten 2 Millionen and helped over 100 startups in the retail grocery sector.

== Early life and education ==
Heinrich Stefan Prokop was born in Vienna in 1962. He studied marketing, controlling, and process engineering, completing various qualifications in Austria and Germany.

== Career ==
Prokop began his career in the 1980s, holding marketing and managerial positions. In the 1990s, he joined cereal manufacturer Gutschermühle Traismauer where he became its managing director. During his time at Gutschermühle, he expanded the company internationally following Austria’s entry into the European Economic Area.

Prokop became a venture capitalist and startup advisor beginning in 2009. He founded or managed several companies such as Prokop’sche Vermögensverwaltungs GmbH and NEO BV, and led the cereal bar acquisition for the HACO Group. In 2013, Prokop co-founded Clever Clover BV, together with his partner Marie Louise Voermanns, a startup accelerator headquartered in Amsterdam. The accelerator provides guidance to FMCG companies from early-stage to market. Through its affiliated funds, Prokop has invested in over 30 startups, mainly in the food, snacks, and consumer products industries. He was also awarded the Goldene Ehrenzeichen in 2014 for his services to the region's business sector.

Beginning in 2015, Prokop has been a panel member on 2 Minuten 2 Millionen, a startup pitch show that has been described as the Austrian version of Shark Tank. On the show, he has become known as the "müsli mann." He left the show in 2025, after being credited with assisting over 100 startups in the grocery retail sector.

Prokop sits on the jury of Austria's "glaub an dich challenge," the largest startup contest for young founders in the country. He also leads the "startup ticket" initiative with REWE International AG.

== Personal life ==
Prokop is married to Brigitte Fruehwirth-Prokop with whom he has one daughter with.
