= Shark Tank Bangladesh =

- Genre: Reality television
- Based on: Shark Tank
- Directed by: Gazi Shubhro
- Starring: see below
- Country of origin: Bangladesh
- Original language: Bengali
- No. of seasons: 1
- No. of episodes: 15

Production
- Executive producers: Fayaz Taher; Chisti Iqbal
- Producer: Ahad Bhai
- Production locations: Dhaka, Bangladesh
- Camera setup: Multiple-camera
- Running time: 45 minutes
- Production companies: Bongo; Sony Pictures Television

Original release
- Network: Bongo; Deepto TV
- Release: April 26 – November 17, 2024

Shark Tank Bangladesh is a Bangladeshi Bengali business reality television series featuring startups and entrepreneurs making business presentations and demonstrations, which is the Bangladeshi installment of the Shark Tank franchise, which in turn is a version of Japanese show Dragons' Den. It is currently being aired in Bongo and Deepto TV.

== Cast ==
=== Sharks ===
The Sharks featured in the first season are:

- Sami Ahmed
- Navin Ahmed
- Ahmed Ali Leon
- Nazim Farhan Chowdhury
- Golam Murshed
- Fahim Mashroor
- Sausan Khan Moyeen
- Samanzar Khan
- Kazi Mahboob Hassan
- Faatin Haque
- Anika Chowdhury
- Samuel Bretzfield
