= Simo Rantalainen =

Finnish journalist (born 1961)

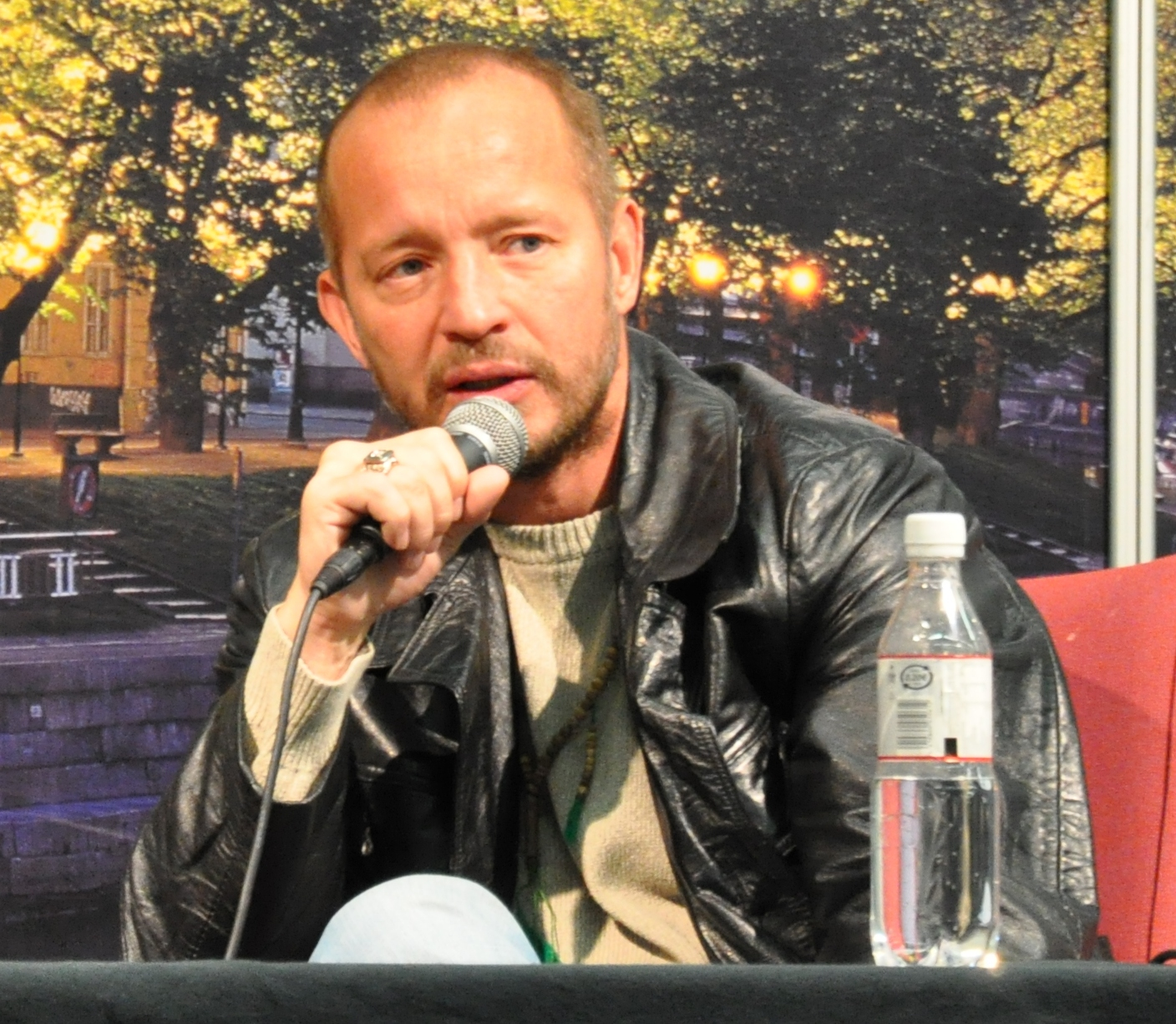
- Simo Rantalainen at the Turku Book Fair 2009.
- Born: 6 August 1961 (age 64); Lahti, Finland
- Occupation: Television presenter

Simo Rantalainen (born August 6, 1961) is a Finnish former journalist and television presenter. He is best known for presenting the popular 1990s talkshow Hyvät, pahat ja rumat on MTV3.

In the early 1990s, Rantalainen became a boxing promoter for Tarmo Uusivirta, Rantalainen wrote a memoir about his experience in February 2017. He lost his television hosting job after assaulting a female journalist in a nightclub

Since leaving showbusiness Simo Rantalainen converted to Islam and adopted the name Mujahed Bin Risto Faisal.
