= Alexander Torrenegra =

Colombian-American entrepreneur, inventor, and investor

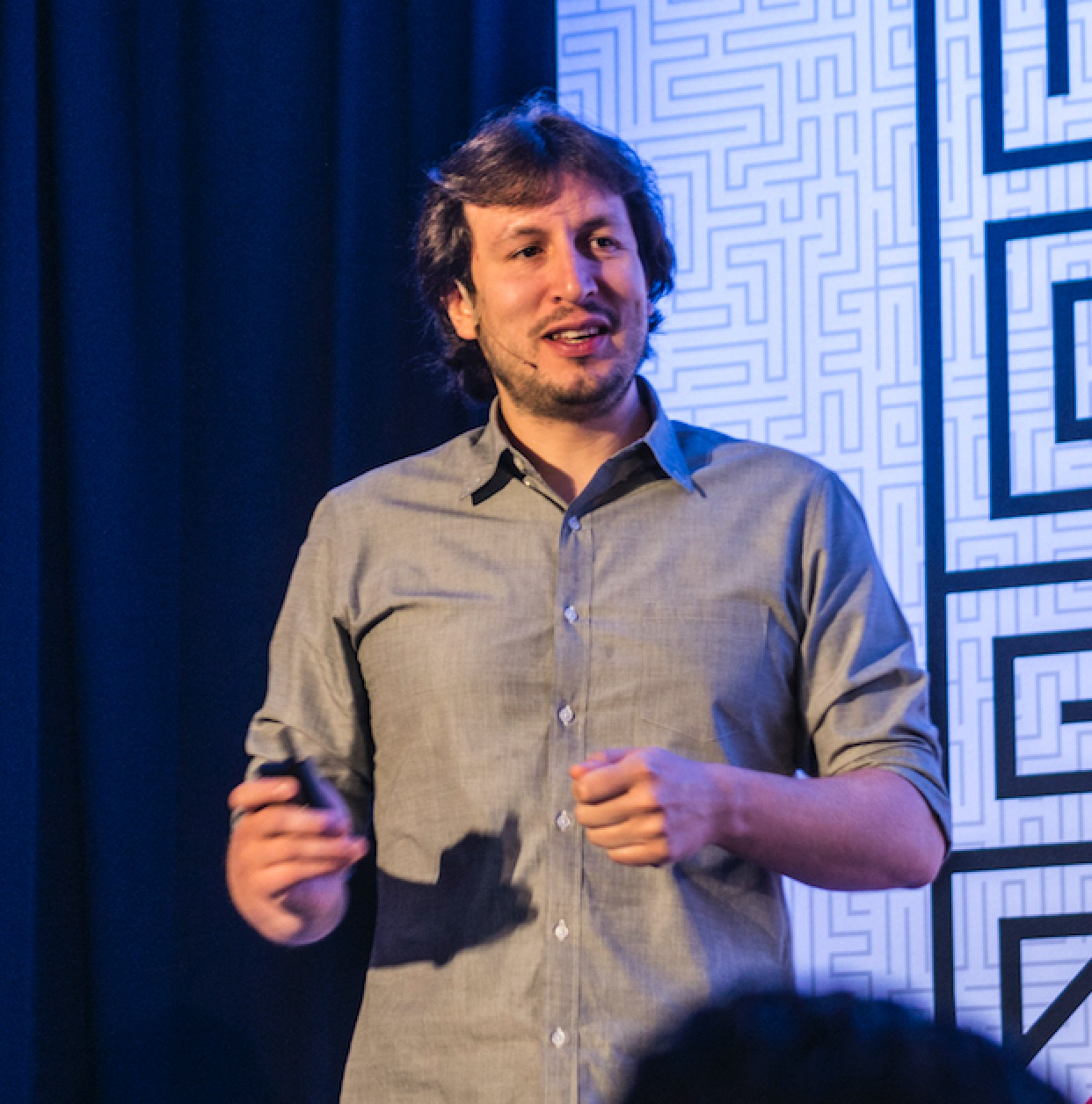
- Torrenegra at Rackspace Solve in 2015
- Born: July 31, 1978 (age 48); Bogotá, Colombia
- Occupations: Entrepreneur; Investor; Television personality
- Known for: Torre, Voice123, Bunny Studio, Torrenegra Accelerator
- Television: Shark Tank Colombia
- Spouse: Tania Zapata
- Children: 2
- Honours: MIT's Innovator Under 35; WEF's Young Global Leader
- Website: torre.co/torrenegra

Alexander Torrenegra (born July 31, 1978) is a Colombian-American entrepreneur, inventor, and investor. He is the founder and CEO of Torre and has founded multiple companies including Voice123 and Bunny Studio. He is also one of the "shark" investors on Sony's reality television series, Shark Tank Colombia and Shark Tank Mexico.

He was featured in MIT's list of Innovators Under 35 in 2012. Torrenegra is a known advocate of remote work. He has worked with remote teams since founding Voice123.

== Early life and education ==
Torrenegra was born in Bogotá, Colombia. He was raised by his mother, Katia, and his maternal grandmother, María Emma Torrenegra.

In 1993, he founded his first company: Apache A-X Cybernetic Enterprises Limited, at the age of 14. He attended La Salle University, Colombia, and Florida International University. He graduated from Miami Dade College with a degree in Computer Science and is part of the Stanford University Leadership Program.

== Career ==
In 1998, Torrenegra moved to the United States. He met his wife, Tania Zapata, who was a voice actress, in Miami, Florida. In 2000, they co-founded Torrenegra Labs. Torrenegra and Zapata founded Voice123, which applied the concept of reverse auctions to the voiceover industry, in 2003.

By 2007, the company passed $1 million in sales and had approximately 150,000 voice actors registered and over 75,000 agency clients by 2016. In September 2021, Voice123 was acquired by Backstage and TA Associates. In 2008, Torrenegra founded LetMeGo, a company focused on hotels competing for bookings. The company closed in 2011.

Torrenegra, Zapata, and Lucho Molina founded Bunny Studio in 2012 with the launch of VoiceBunny, then renamed Bunny Studio, an API for professional human voices.

In 2013, he was part of a delegation of immigrant entrepreneurs that met with President Barack Obama. He also works to improve government support for innovation in Colombia.

Since 2017, Torrenegra has been in the main cast of Shark Tank Colombia as an investor, only being absent during season 4, and as a guest in Shark Tank Mexico since 2024.

In 2018, he co-founded Tribe, a remote-first video communication platform, and also started Torrenegra Organization to support bootstrapped entrepreneurs in accelerating their businesses.

He founded Torre, an online network for finding work and talent through matching, and became its CEO. In 2021, Torre secured a $10 million seed round led by former executives from Apple, Facebook, Uber, and SpaceX.

== Books ==
- 2020: Remoter: the why-and-how guide to building successful remote teams
