= Catherine Barba =

French entrepreneur (born 1973)

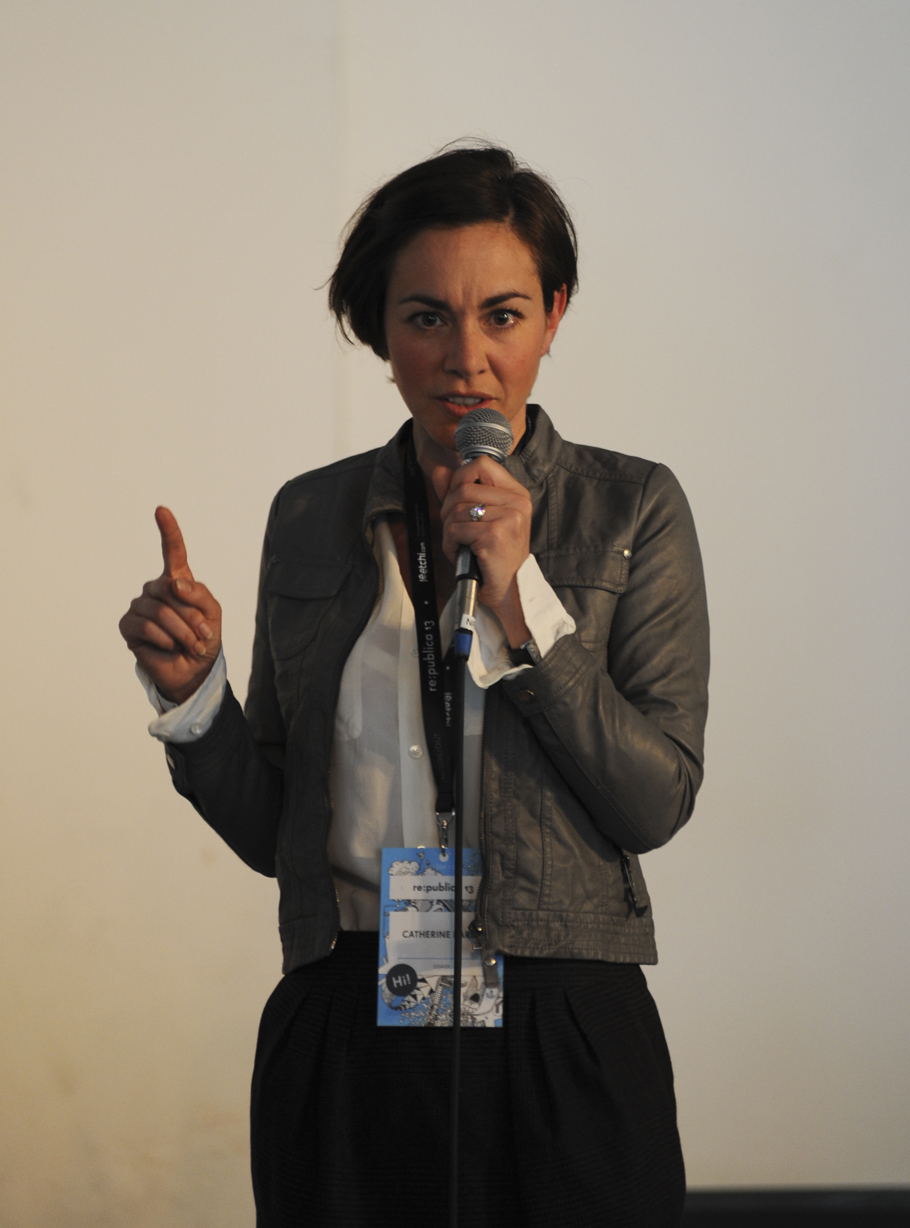
- Born: 28 February 1973 (age 53); Rueil-Malmaison, France
- Education: ESCP Europe
- Occupation: Businesswoman

Catherine Barba Chiaramonti (born 28 February 1973) is a French entrepreneur and business executive who is active in digital retail. Her company, Catherine Barba Group, specializes in assisting retail startups with entering the digital market.

== Biography ==
Born in 1973 in Rueil-Malmaison in Île-de-France, Barba is the granddaughter of a poor family of Spanish immigrants. Her parents, however, prospered as managers: her father at Esso and her mother at Technip. She studied business at the École supérieure de commerce de Paris, graduating in 1996.

In 1995, while working as an intern at Technip in the United States, she became interested in the Web. As a result, on graduating she headed OMD's newborn internet department until 1999 when she joined IFrance where she was managing director until the company was acquired by Vivendi in 2003. She then set up her own internet shopping company, CashStore, which in 2010 she sold to Plebicom with its 500,000 users and 1,200 e-Business partner sites. She also developed a digital commerce consultancy, Malinea, which she sold to vente.privée.com in 2011. In September 2012, she founded Catherine Barba Group which assists global retailers develop omnichannel strategy and customer service in the mobile environment.

In addition to her business interests, Barba is a strong supporter of women in technology. In recent years, she has organized and contributed to events such as La Journée de la Femme Digitale (Digital Women Day).

In 2011, Catherine Barba received the title of Femme d'Entreprise en Or (Golden Businesswoman), consolidating her reputation as a pioneer of the web. In 2021, Echos Entrepreneurs reported on her continued success as president of GB Group and founder of Malinea.

Chiaramonti is a co-founder of Envi, a school for independents and freelancers.

In 2020, Barba was an investor on the first season of the French reality television series Qui veut être mon associé? ("Who wants to be my business partner?"), part of the Dragons' Den franchise.

== Personal life ==
Barba lives in New York and is married to the entrepreneur Arnaud Chiaramonti, with whom she has a daughter. She and Chiaramonti manage the Florida-based Catherine Barba Group LLC.
