= Hyvät, pahat ja rumat =

Television series

- Genre: Chat show
- Presented by: Jari Sarasvuo; Simo Rantalainen; Neil Hardwick
- Country of origin: Finland
- Original language: Finnish

Original release
- Network: MTV3

Hyvät, pahat ja rumat (English: The Good, the Bad and the Ugly) was a popular 1990s Finnish comedy chat show presented on MTV3.
