= Lithuanian Confederation of Industrialists =

Coordinates: 54°41′22″N 25°16′37″E

- Lietuvos Pramoninkų Konfederacija
- LPK Logo
- Abbreviation: LPK
- Formation: 1989
- Legal status: Non-profit organization
- Purpose: Lithuanian industry interest group
- Headquarters: Vilnius, Lithuania
- Location: Vilnius st. 31, LT-01402, Vilnius
- Region served: Lithuania
- Members: over 4000 Lithuanian companies
- President: Vidmantas Janulevičius
- Director General: Raminta Radavičienė
- Affiliations: BusinessEurope, BIAC
- Website: www.lpk.lt

The Lithuanian Confederation of Industrialists (Lithuanian: Lietuvos pramonininku konfederacija) or LPK is a major association of industry associations and companies in Lithuania which represents the interests of large industrialists and employers. The Confederation in an umbrella organization uniting 50 trade and 9 regional associations and 31 non-associated members which comprise over 4000 medium and large enterprises from various public and private sectors. They cover all the main sectors of industry, which generates 41 % of Lithuanian GDP. Confederation membership is entirely voluntary.

LPK is a full-fledged member of international organizations like Confederation of European Business (BUSINESSEUROPE), , Business at OECD (BIAC) and others.

== History ==
LPK considers itself a successor of the Union of the Lithuanian Entrepreneurs, Industrialists and Businessmen (Lithuanian: Lietuvių prekybininkų, pramonininkų ir amatininkų sąjunga), established in June 1930. The Union ceased to exist in 1940 when Lithuania was occupied by the Soviet Union and all businesses were nationalized. The modern Association of Lithuanian Industrialists was established on June 17, 1989 (it was later renamed to the Confederation of Lithuanian Industrialists). The Association united manufacturing companies, banks, trade and commercial enterprises as well as educational and research institutions.

== Established awards ==
- Lithuanian Exporter of the Year
- Lithuanian Product of the Year
- Knight of Profession
- Petras Vileišis Nomination
- Vytautas Andrius Graičiūnas Nomination
- Golden Sign of Honour

== Presidents ==
- Rimvydas Jasinavičius (1989–1990)
- Algimantas Matulevičius (1990–1993)
- Bronislovas Lubys (1993–2011)
- Robertas Dargis (2012–2020)
- Vidmantas Janulevičius (since 2020)
