= John Vanhara =

- Born: 12 May 1972 (age 54); Brno, Czechoslovakia (now Czech Republic)
- Education: California Coast University
- Occupations: entrepreneur, blogger, writer
- Website: www.podnikanivusa.com/about

John Vanhara (born 12 May 1972 in Brno) is an American-Czech businessman, writer and blogger. He was born in Czechoslovakia as "Jan Vaňhara", but in 2002 he moved to the United States, where he studied a business administration at the California Coast University. His business activities started in Las Vegas, Nevada, where he founded several companies including real estate brokerage MillionSaverHomes and incorporation company IncParadise that was operated by Vanhara's entity EastBiz.com, Inc and later sold.

In 2007 he founded a package forwarding company Shipito, which was sold to Tritium Partners in 2015.

== Sources ==
- Article contains translated text from John Vanhara on the Czech Wikipedia retrieved on 20 November 2018.
