= Anthony Bourbon =

French entrepreneur (born May 22, 1988)

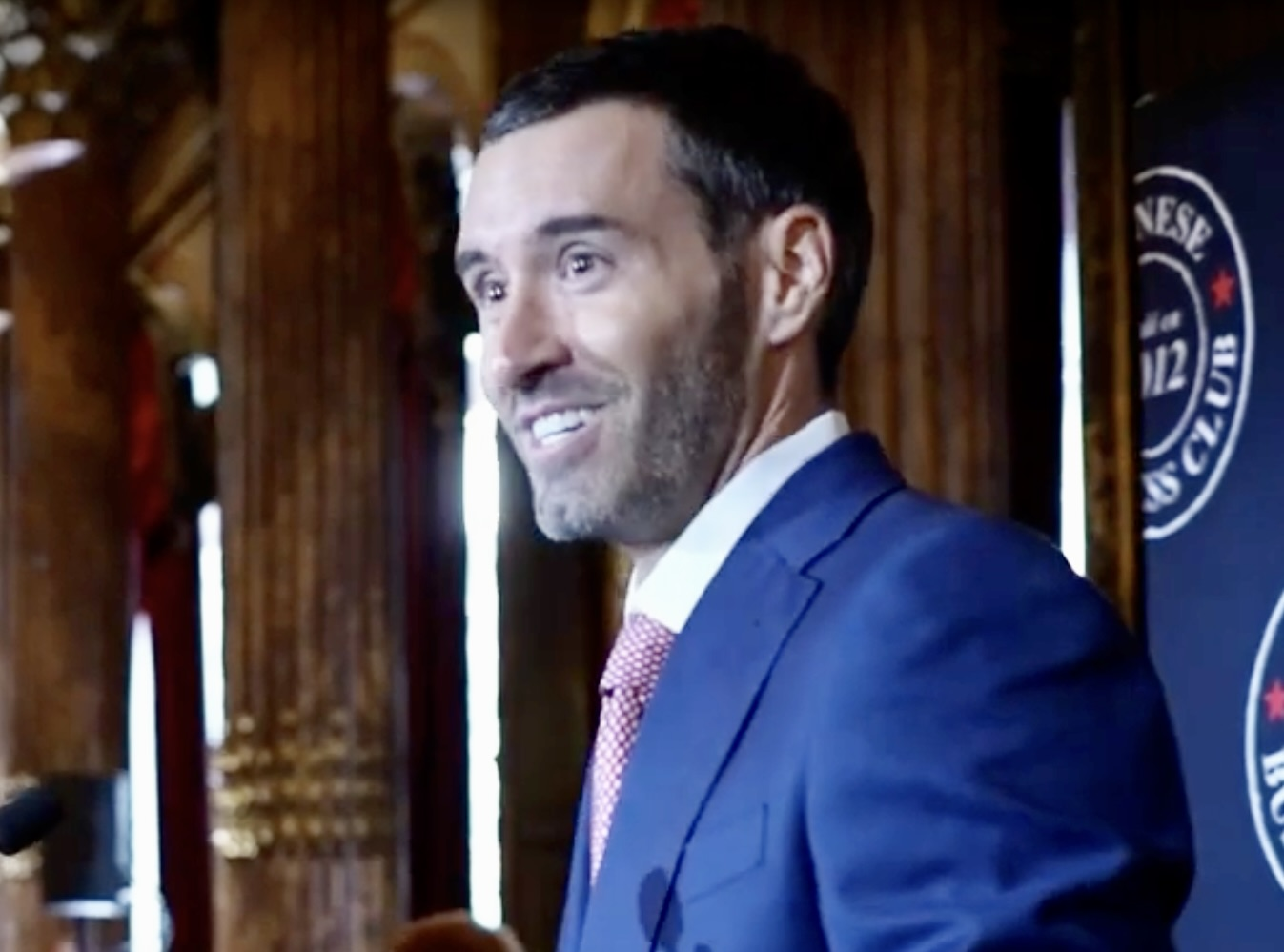
- Born: May 22, 1988 (age 38); Bordeaux, France
- Education: University of Bordeaux
- Occupations: entrepreneur and author

Anthony Bourbon (born May 22, 1988, in Bordeaux, France) is a French entrepreneur and author.

He is the founder and CEO of Feed., a company that offers meal bars and snacks, as well as Blast.Club, an investment platform.

== Biography ==
=== Childhood and education ===
Born on May 22, 1988, Anthony Bourbon grew up in the suburbs of Bordeaux. At the age of seventeen, he left his family home and ended up on the streets with only a small amount of savings. He later earned a master's degree in private law, specializing in corporate finance, from the University of Bordeaux.

=== Career ===
After working as a lawyer in a real estate group, he simultaneously founded AB Participation, a financial holding company, and Feed., a FoodTech company that offers meal bars and snacks.

In 2020, he became a sponsor of the French Tech Tremplin program launched by the government.

Starting in 2021, he participated in season 2 of Qui veut être mon associé ? alongside Marc Simoncini, Jean-Pierre Nadir, Delphine André, Éric Larchevêque, Sophie Mechaly, and Isabelle Weill. He continued to participate in the 2023 and 2024 seasons.

In September 2022, he founded Blast.Club, a private investment club that offers opportunities to invest in startups. However, this investment club has faced criticism for its structure and fee system.

== Publication ==
In 2022 he published his first book Forcez votre destin – Résilience, ambition, passion: toutes les clés pour réussir with Michel Lafon Publishing, in which he shares advice on entrepreneurial life, drawing from his own journey.

== Personal life ==
He is signed up for cryopreservation with Tomorrow Biostasis.

In 2026, Bourbon criticized a journalist from Les Échos, alleging that personal information about him had been published without his consent and that it posed a risk to his safety.
