= Robertas Dargis =

Lithuanian businessperson (born 1960)

Robertas Dargis is a Lithuanian business leader. He is currently the president of Lithuanian Real Estate Development Association and chairman of the board and the owner of JSC Eika. He is the former president of Lithuanian Confederation of Industrialists (LPK). He was born in 1960 in Irkutsk, Russia.

== Career ==
- 1979-1983 Construction manager of Kruonis power plant
- 1987-1992 VĮ “Aras” foreman, head of ground works, director of commerce.
- 1992-1993 Deputy Director, conglomerate "Monolitas" (VĮ “Ekspo”). Residential and industrial construction
- 1993–present Chairman of the Board, “Eika” - one of the largest real estate development companies in Lithuania.
- 2001-2002 Chancellor of the Government of Lithuania
- 2004–present President of Lithuanian Real Estate Development Association
- 2012–present President of Lithuanian Confederation of Industrialists.

== Education ==
- 1978-1983 Vilnius Institute of Civil Engineering. Building Engineer
- 1978 Mažeikiai 3d secondary school.

== Activities ==
- 2006 - until now Member of Presidium in the Lithuanian Builders Association
- 2006-2010 Member of committee of "Lithuanian National Prize for Progress" project
- 2007-2008 Head of the Working Group to prepare the Lithuanian land system conversion guidelines
- 2006-2008 Supernumerary Counselor of Lithuania`s Prime Minister
- 2000-2007 Member of the Board in the Institute of Civil Society
- 2003-2004 Lecturer in Vilnius Gediminas Technical University.
- 2001-2003 Supernumerary Counselor of the President of Lithuania
- 1999-2000 Consultant to the Government of the Republic of Lithuania on municipal housing issues
- Coauthor of textbook "Sustainable Real Estate Development"
- Publisher of textbook "Sailing” by A. Dovydenas
- One of initiators of "Amber sail" project
- Sponsor of "Vilnius Jazz" festival
- Member of the Board of Trustees in Institute of International Relations and Political Science
- Author of the project "Give a vision to Lithuania"

== Awards ==
- In 2003. Presidential Decree for the Order for Merits to Lithuania. The Cross of Officer.
- In 2006. Business Hall of Fame laureate
- In 2006. Lithuanian Honorary Boatmen Mark by Ministry of Transport and Communications
- In 2007. Olympic Star award of Lithuanian National Olympic Committee
- In 2009. Presidential nomination Order for Merits to Lithuania. Cross of Commander
- In 2009. "Sustainable Building" award for activities aimed at realization of sustainable development ideas
- In 2009. Petras Vileišis nomination
- In 2010. KKSD Sports Cross of Honour for the important contribution to development of sport in Lithuania
- Mark of Honour by Lithuanian Builders Association
- Mark of Honour by Lithuanian Union of Engineers
- Award of Merit to Vilnius municipal government
