= Manē no Tora =

Japanese television show

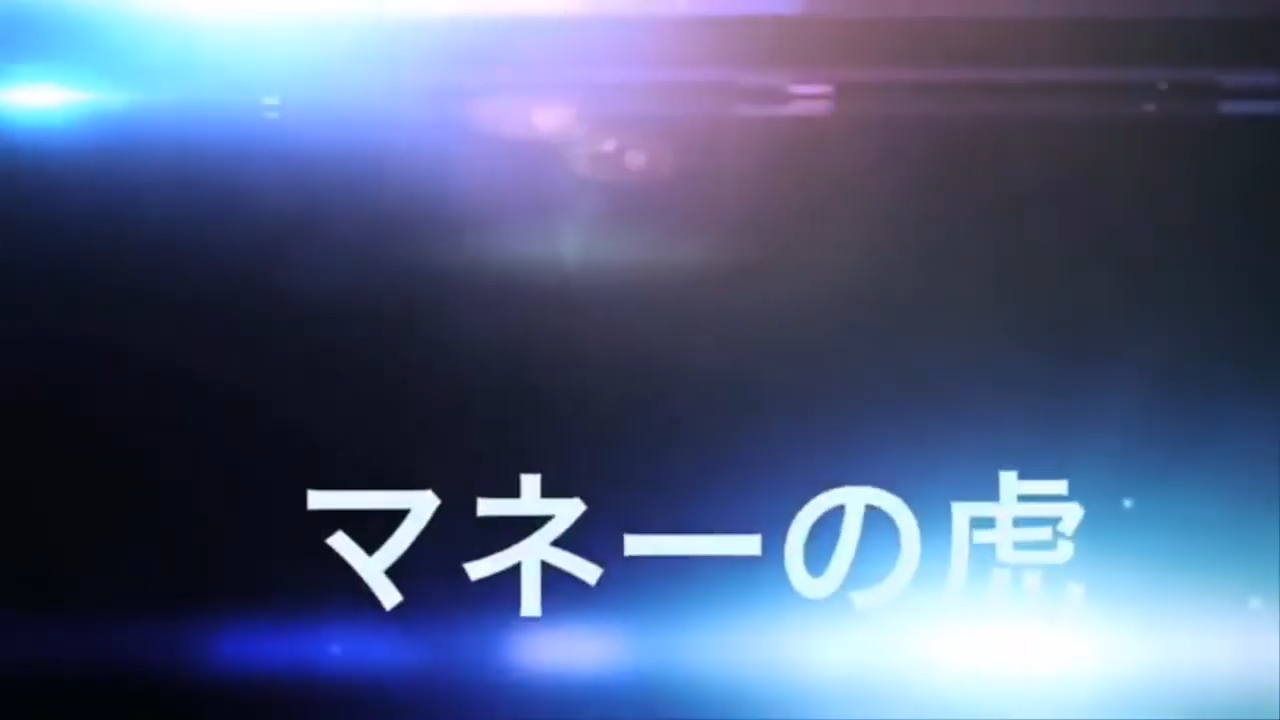
- Also known as: The Tigers of Money; Money Tigers
- Genre: Reality television Game show
- Directed by: Kurihara Jin
- Presented by: Kurihara Jin
- Country of origin: Japan
- Original language: Japanese
- No. of episodes: <100

Production
- Running time: October 2001– sometime in 2003
- Production companies: Nippon TV, Sony Pictures Television

Original release
- Network: Nippon TV
- Release: October 2001 – March 2004

Manē no Tora (マネーの虎; lit. "Money Tigers" or "The Tigers of Money") is a Japanese reality television game show that was broadcast from October 2001 until March 2004 on Nippon TV (Nippon Television) in Japan, initially only broadcasting in the late Saturday night slot in the Kantō region, before broadcasting nationwide in the Friday prime time slot. The show was hosted by Eisaku Yoshida, with entrepreneurs trying to convince a group of investors called 'Tigers' to invest in their company.

The show was later adapted by the BBC (British Broadcasting Company) in the United Kingdom as Dragons' Den and by the ABC (American Broadcasting Company) in the United States of America as Shark Tank, with many other countries also having an adaption.

== Premise ==
The show consisted of several entrepreneurs presenting their concepts for a business to a panel of five wealthy investors known as 'Tigers' and 'Money Tigers' to get business advice and convince them to invest in the business, in exchange for equity (partial ownership of the business). The show had the slogan 'No Challenge, No Success'. The license to the format is owned by Sony Pictures Television.

== Background and development ==
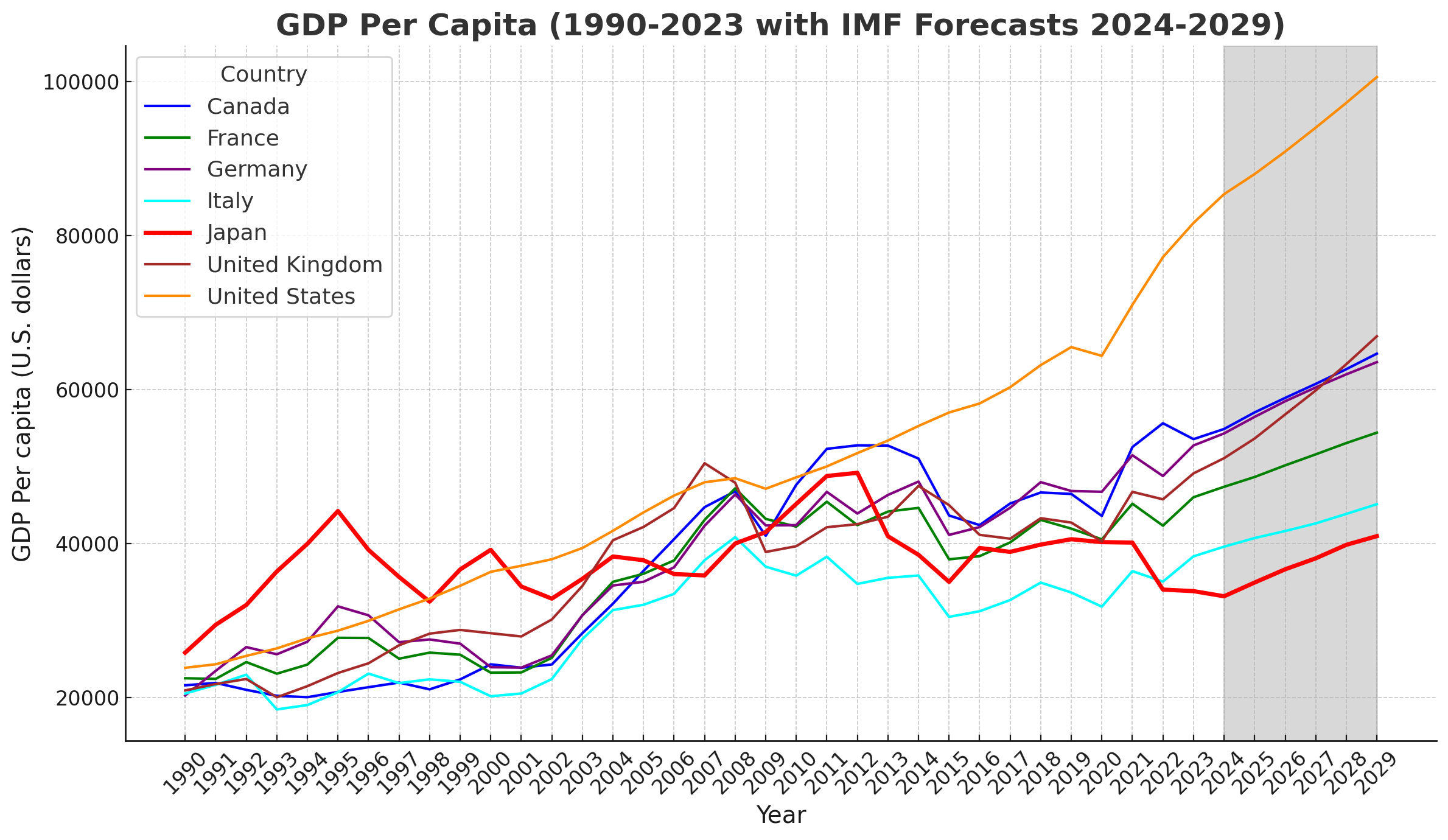
Japan's nominal GDP per capita has stagnated around $40,000 since the 1990s, while other economies have experienced significant growth.

In the early 1990s, Japan's asset price bubble burst, leading to a lengthy period of economic stagnation continuing into the rest of the 1990s, the 2000s and the 2010s known as the Lost Decades, with the 1990s specifically known as the Lost Decade. After the burst, the Japanese Government made several policies and tax incentives to encourage startup companies, as part of an effort to diversify the traditionally risk averse Japanese economy.

According to Robyn Klingler-Vidra, writing for The Conversation, Manē no Tora was "the first exposure [for Japanese viewers] to the concept of pitching for investment. The show aimed to "normalise entrepreneurship and equity investment" in Japan, with the terms 'equity', 'valuation' and 'return on investment' becoming more discussed. The name Manē no Tora is a play on words with war criminal Tomoyuki Yamashita's nickname 'Mare no tora', meaning 'The Tiger of Malaya' or Malaysian tiger.

=== Casting and production ===
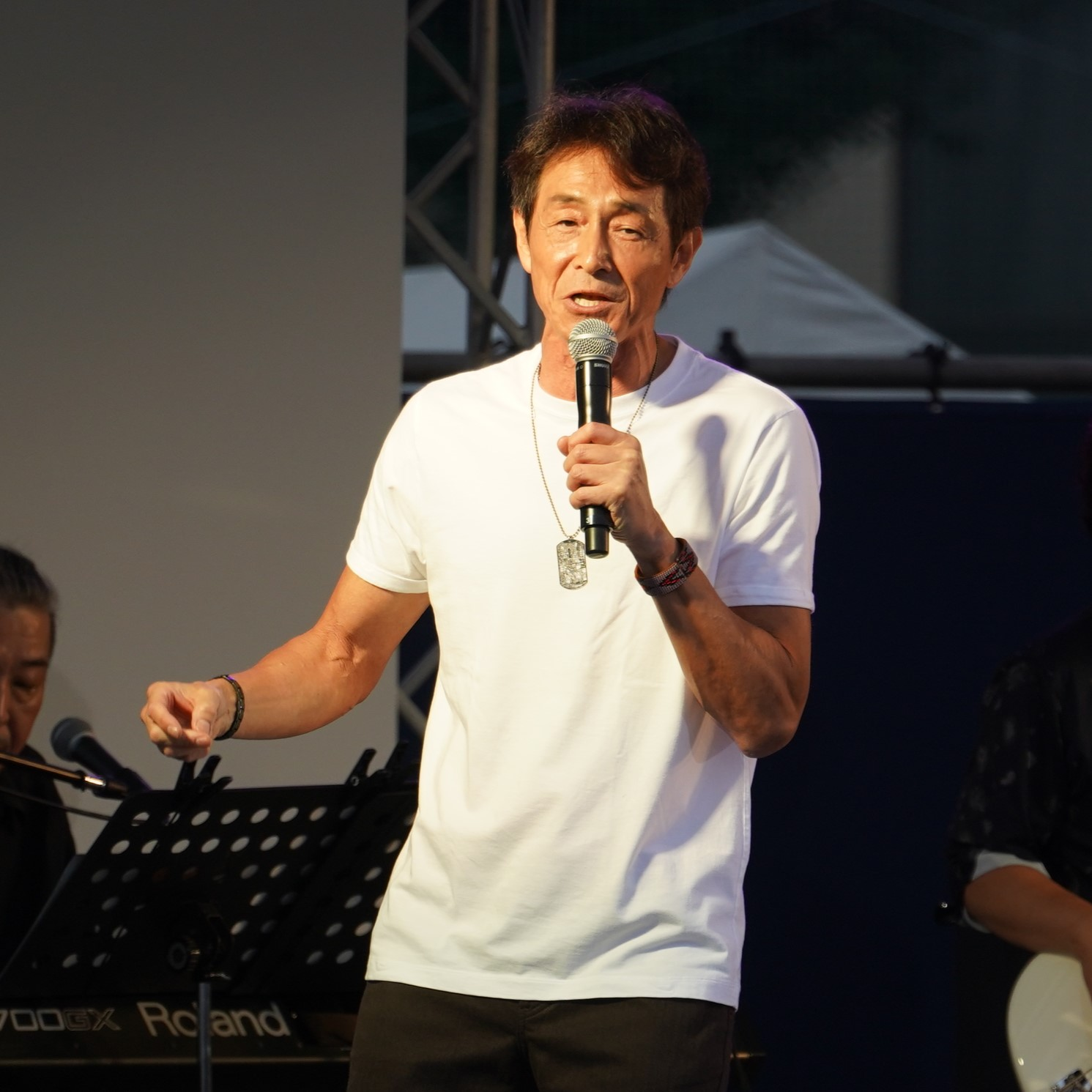
Eisaku Yoshida, the show's host, in 2024

The show was introduced with a video featuring Japanese adult film actress Ai Nagase in a sailor's outfit. The show was hosted by Japanese actor Eisaku Yoshida, and directed and produced by Kurihara Jin. The show featured many Japanese businessman as Tigers, among the more iconic are; Seiko Group president Shinji Hattori, food industry businessman Yoshihiro Terada, investor Hiroyuki Ariyoshi and former Minister of Justice Ritsuko Nagao.

== Release ==
Manē no Tora first aired on Nippon TV in October 2001. From October 2001 to April 2002, it aired exclusively in the Kantō region of Japan during the late night slot 00:50 – 01:50 on Saturdays, with viewership ratings of >7%. In April 2002, the show started broadcasting nationwide during prime time on Fridays, it stopped running in 2003 and ceased broadcast in March 2004.

== Reception ==
Manē no Tora is considered the origin of the 'entrepreneurs pitching startup business ideas to a group of investors' television format. Vietnamese website Kilala.vn considers Manē no Tora to have been popular "right from its debut", and the show to have "le[ft] a significant legacy in the field of reality television production". According to Japanese culture website Suki Desu, Manē no Tora helped popularize entrepreneurship in Japan.

== Legacy ==
The show has been adapted in many countries, including, the 2009 five-time Emmy Award–winning American adaptation Shark Tank and the 2005 British adaptation Dragons' Den. According to Nippon TV and Sony Pictures Television, as of February 2024, "almost US$1 billion (£790,000,000) in investments has been agreed in Dens and Tanks across the globe since the format launched".
