= Wandia Gichuru =

CEO of Vivo Activewear

Wandia Gichuru is the CEO and co-founder of Vivo Activewear.

== Early life and background ==
Wandia Gichuru was born in Montreal, Canada to a Canadian mother and a Kenyan father. She is the only girl and the second born among three other siblings.

== Education ==
She studied at Kilimani Primary School and later joined Loreto Convent Msongari High School. She then joined the University of Western Ontario where she graduated with a degree in Economics. She also achieved a master's degree in Business Administration from the University of Cape Town in 1996.

== Work ==
Before she went to study in Cape Town, she worked for Kenya Wildlife Service and Citibank. After her MBA, she came back to Kenya and began as an Operations Analyst at the World Bank and later on worked as an associate at JP Morgan (London), a governance adviser with the UK Department for International Development (London) and a policy adviser with the United Nations Development Programme (New York).

Wandia left employment and started a fashion company in Kenya in 2011. She co-founded the company, Vivo Activewear, with Anne Marie Burugu and is its CEO as of 2016. She was also an investor in the Kenya Commercial Bank Lion's Den show in seasons 1 and 2.

Awards

- The Kenyan Fashion Brand of the year 2017
