= MoneyHunt =

- Genre: Reality; Business
- Created by: Miles Spencer; Cliff Ennico
- Starring: Miles Spencer; Cliff Ennico
- Country of origin: United States
- Original language: English

Production
- Executive producer: Deborah Ely
- Camera setup: Multiple camera

Original release
- Network: PBS

MoneyHunt is a reality-based television program that allowed entrepreneurs to pitch their ideas to a panel of experts and receive candid feedback on improving their presentations. Produced by MoneyHunt Properties, Inc. the program was distributed to American public television stations in the US and several markets overseas from 1997 to 2004.

== Format ==
MoneyHunt was distributed on public television and sourced candidates through online auditions. MoneyHunt eventually added a series of live events produced in conjunction with regional venture conferences to screen test candidates. The show was hosted by presenters with no on-camera experience and was produced to simulate a real venture pitch with most blunders and pauses often kept in the final cut for dramatic effect. The show offered cash prizes in the form of an investment in the best contestants.

Co-Hosts Miles and Cliff opened the program with a brief greeting and soon introduced the first guest, who was waiting off stage. Like a business meeting, Miles or Cliff greeted the guest and welcomed them to the table. A MoneyHunt Mentor joined each show, adding specific domain expertise to the questioning. Each guest had 8 minutes to detail key categories, such as the product and market. The final segment was the review session, where the pitches of each guest weredebated and awarded thumbs up or down. Beginning in Season Six, MoneyHunt began awarding a cash award as convertible debt (leaving the pricing of the equity to subsequent investors).

The MoneyHunt set.

== Hosts ==
Cliff Ennico and Miles Spencer.

Miles Spencer and Cliff Ennico first met working on small equity financings in their home state of Connecticut. Ennico is an attorney, and Spencer was a banker and venture capitalist.

== History ==

MoneyHunt was first conceived at a continuing education class in Greenwich, Connecticut. It was taped at cablevision's public access studios in Norwalk in

1996 for a fee of $500 per night. MoneyHunt premiered on public television at WHYY in Philadelphia in 1998 while the Internet boom was beginning to draw interest to the startup subject. The first MoneyHunt Mentor was Jerry Yang of Yahoo!.

MoneyHunt produced six original seasons from 1997 to 2001 and was sponsored by MasterCard, Yahoo!, PriceWaterhouseCoopers, Register.com, and Excite. The show was slotted as primarily a Sunday morning show and typically ran next to weekly news wrap up shows.

The format was licensed overseas and ran in markets including Italy, Spain, and China.

MoneyHunt was originally formed in 1996 as the marketing arm of a small venture capital firm, Capital Express, which included Miles Spencer as a partner. Capital Express benefitted from the deal flow of so many emerging companies appearing on the show. MoneyHunt was subsequently spun off into an independent entity in 1997. By 2000, MoneyHunt was no longer producing new episodes and the library and rights were sold to a prior licensee.
