= Elie Khouri =

Lebanese-French entrepreneur (born May 8, 1964)

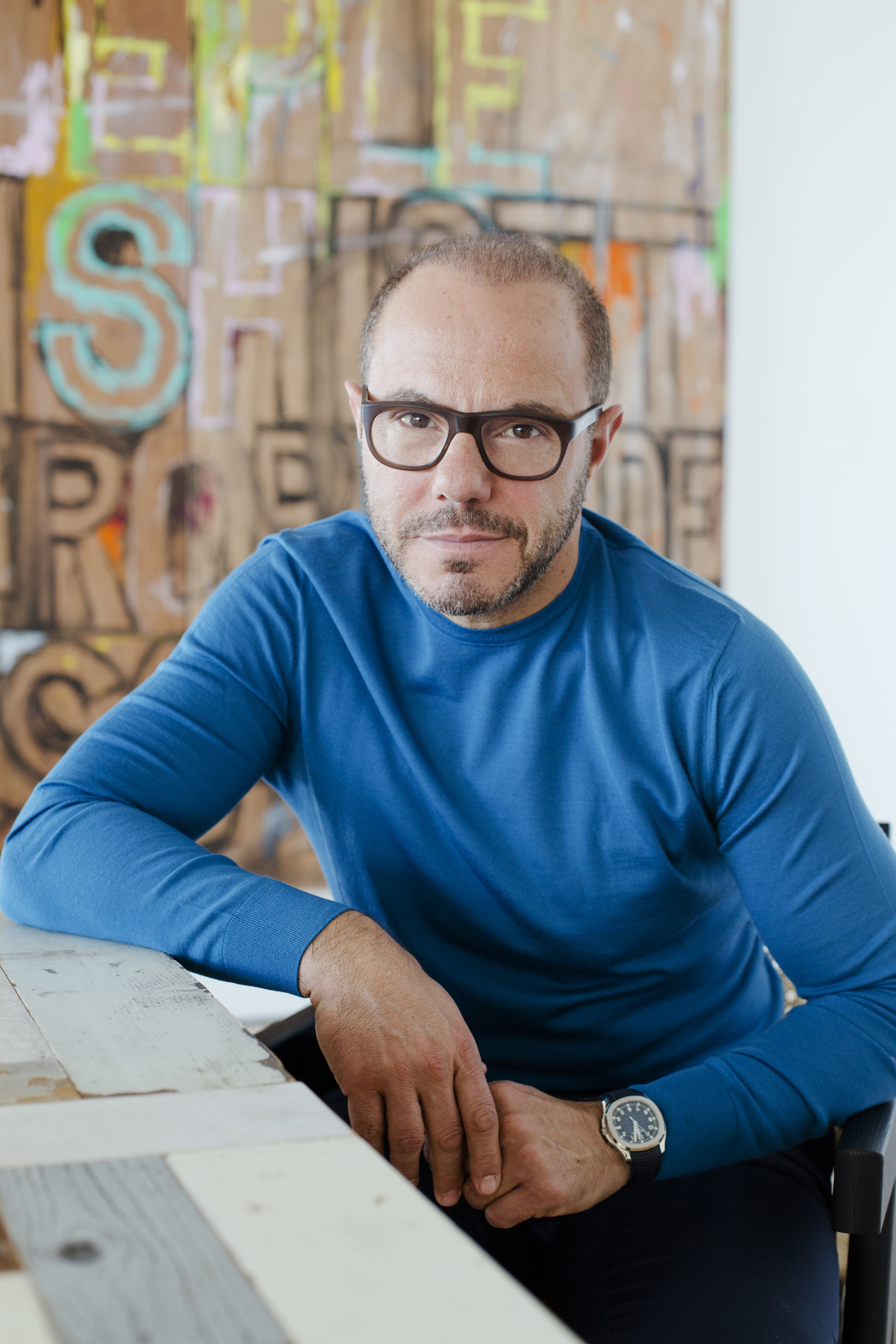
- Khouri in October 2024
- Born: May 8, 1964 (age 62); Beirut, Lebanon
- Education: American University of Beirut
- Occupations: Businessman; Media Executive
- Known for: Founder and CEO of Vivium; Chairman of Omnicom Media Group MENA
- Children: 3

Elie Khouri (born May 8, 1964) is a Lebanese-French businessman, entrepreneur, and art patron, who is the founder and chairman of Vivium, a single-family office based in Dubai. Since 2019, he has been the chairman of Omnicom Media Group for the Middle East and North Africa (MENA), having previously served as the CEO from 2006 to 2019.

Khouri is also one of the main "sharks" on Shark Tank Dubai.

== Early life and education ==
Khouri was born in Beirut in 1964. His early life was affected by the Lebanese Civil War, as his family was unable to relocate from the city. He attended the American University of Beirut, where he earned a bachelor's degree in business administration in 1986 and an MBA in business and finance in 1988.

== Career ==
After graduation, Khouri began his career with Batten, Barton, Durstine & Osborn (BBDO) in Cyprus. In the 1990s, he held senior roles at Impact BBDO in Dubai and Beirut, serving as associate managing director of the Beirut office from 1996 to 2001.

In 2001, Khouri moved to Dubai and was instrumental in restructuring Omnicom's media operations into Optimum Media Direction (OMD), which became a leading media agency in the Middle East by 2005. In 2006, Omnicom Media Group expanded its presence in the Middle East and North Africa (MENA) by launching PHD globally and opening a new office in Dubai. This expansion led to the creation of the Omnicom Media Group MENA, where Khouri transitioned from his regional managing director role at OMD to become the group's CEO. He held this position until 2019, when he was appointed chairman.

In 2017, Khouri founded Vivium, a single-family office that invests in real estate, design, ventures, and collectibles including art. Khouri was involved in launching Sotheby's International Realty in Dubai and supported its expansion into KSA, the UK, and Spain. In 2023, Elie brought Vivium into the hospitality sector with the acquisition of a boutique hotel in Paros, Greece. He also introduced design brands like Cassina, Kettal, and Rimadesio to Dubai within Vivium's portfolio, starting with the opening of the first Cassina mono-brand store in the region in March 2023.

In 2023, Khouri served as a member of the jury in the first season of Shark Tank Dubai. In 2025, Khouri returned as a main panel investor for the third season of Shark Tank Dubai which featured over 77 entrepreneurs.

== Art collecting and patronage ==
Khouri is an art collector and patron. His collection includes contemporary paintings, sculptures, and design pieces, featuring works by artists such as Kehinde Wiley, George Condo, Christina Quarles, Carol Bove, and Olafur Eliasson. Elie's art collection features pieces that explore a variety of contemporary and timeless themes, expressed through diverse artistic styles.

Khouri is a member of Tate's Middle East and North Africa Acquisitions Committee and MoMA's Media and Performance Committee. He also supports the Lebanese Pavilion at the Venice Biennale and the Association for the Promotion and Exhibition of the Arts in Lebanon.

In 2023 and 2024, Khouri was featured on the Top 200 Collectors list by ARTnews.

== Personal life ==
Khouri married Mylene Khouri in 1992. They have since separated, and have three daughters together.
