= Noora Fagerström =

Finnish entrepreneur and politician

Noora Fagerström (born 1985) is a Finnish entrepreneur and politician.

In 2011, Fagerström co-founded together with her husband a chain of juice bars called Jungle Juice Bar, which as at 2023 has c. 60 outlets.

== Biography ==
She appeared as an advisor in the 7th and 8th seasons of the Finnish version of The Apprentice TV show, Diili. She also appears as one of the investors in the Finnish version of Dragons' Den, Leijonan Luola, in which she was herself earlier a contestant.

In April 2023, she was elected as a Member of Parliament for the Uusimaa constituency, representing the National Coalition Party.
