= Nick Bell (Australian entrepreneur) =

Australian businessman

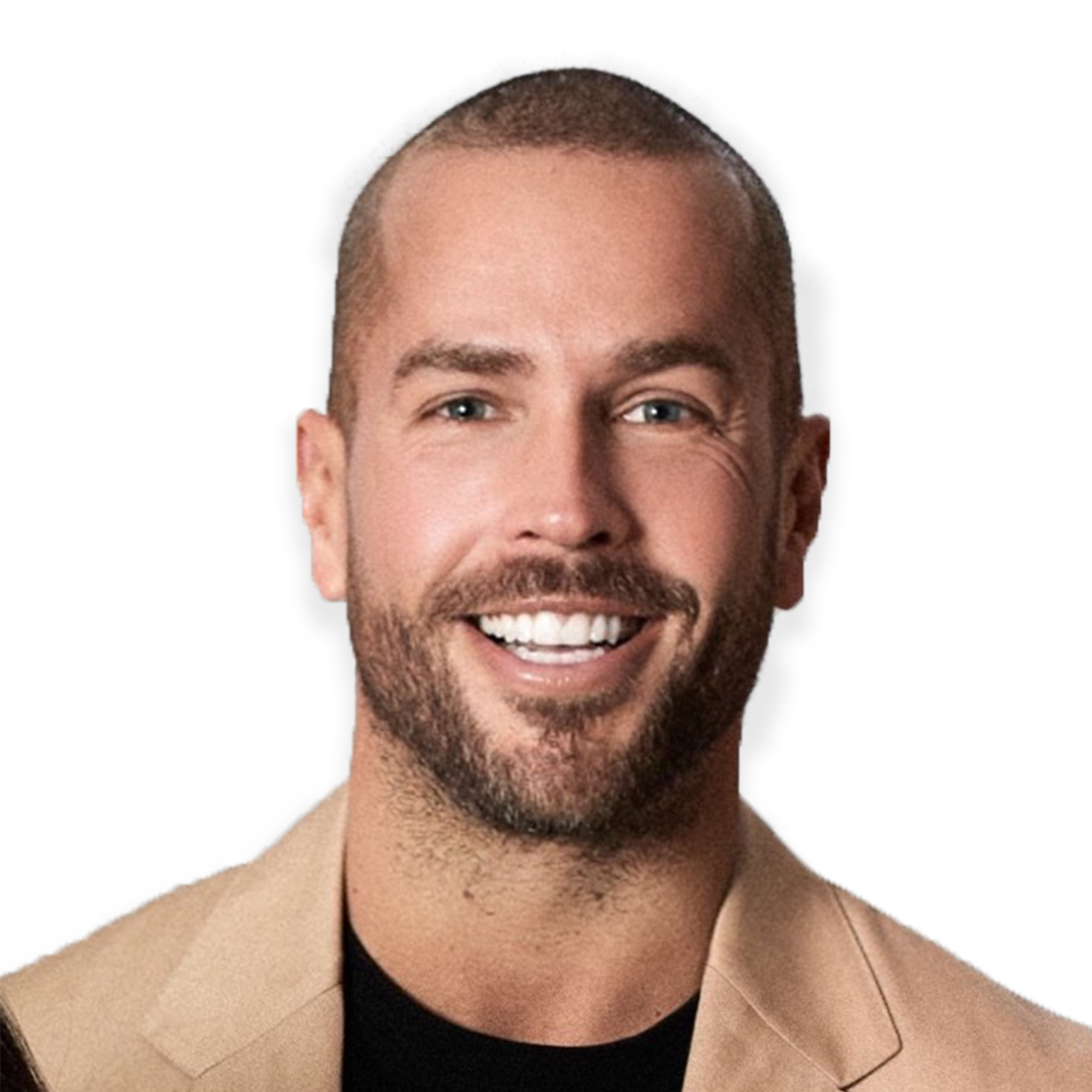
- Born: 14 August 1980 (age 46); Victoria, Australia
- Education: Victoria University, Australia
- Occupation: Businessperson
- Known for: Founder of Removify, WME, Appscore

Nick Bell (born 14 August 1980) is an Australian businessman. He has founded or co-founded several companies in Australia and internationally, including Appscore, Removify, Lisnic, Primal, and First Page Digital. In 2020, Bell’s net worth was estimated by Australian Financial Review 2020 Rich List to be $274 million.

== Early life and education ==
Bell was born in Victoria where he was raised on a farm. He attended Mowbray High School and Victoria University, Australia. He left and went to London where he worked for several bars, prior to returning to Melbourne to continue his studies. He spent six weeks studying for a business degree before leaving school without graduating.

== Career ==
In 2004, Bell launched his first business selling skincare products. He later closed the business due to supply chain issues. He launched WME, a search marketing firm, from his home with $400. His group of companies grew to 1200+ employees and $160 million in revenue by 2019. Bell sold WME to Melbourne IT for $39 million in 2017, but he stayed on to expand the company internationally. Outside of WME, Bell has founded or co-founded over 12 companies, including Appscore, Removify, Lisnic, Primal, and First Page Digital.

In 2019, Bell co-founded Removify with Andrew Whitford, a reputation management company that removes unwanted and fake reviews published on websites.

Other companies founded by Bell include Outsourcey, USEO, SEO Agency, and Results First. He is also an investor in Tribe, Frase.io, Disputify, Vervoe, Cannabis, Ideapod, Lead Chat and Greenfields.

In 2022, Bell appeared as a boardroom advisor for the sixth season of The Celebrity Apprentice Australia.

In 2024, Bell launched Outsourcey, a business process outsourcing company in the Philippines, focusing on cost savings in marketing and other business functions.

In 2024, Bell joined the new lineup of judges on Shark Tank Australia where entrepreneurs pitch their ideas to secure investment and mentorship. The judging panel also includes Maxine Horne, Davie Fogarty, Jane Lu, and Robert Herjavec. The 2024 season is produced by Sony Pictures Television’s Curio Pictures for Network 10.

== Personal wealth ==
Bell's net worth was estimated to be $274 million, according to the Financial Review 2020 Rich List.

Year	Financial Review Rich List	
Year	Rank	Net worth
2016		$68 million^{[note a]}
2017		$114 million ▲^{[note a]}
2018		$170 million ▲^{[note a]}
2019		$217 million ▲^{[note a]}
2020		$274 million ▲^{[note a]}
