= Ath Pavura =

Reality TV series in Sri Lanka

Ath Pavura is a television program broadcast in Sri Lanka, featuring social entrepreneurs who pitch their business ideas to impact investors. Entrepreneurs must demonstrate a measurable social impact from their product or business to participate in the show. If the impact investors are impressed, they can choose to invest up to Rs. 5 million into the business. It is similar to Shark Tank.

Ath Pavura is the first show of its kind, promoting social and environmental entrepreneurship and providing equity investments to allow businesses to grow both their financial and social impact.

== History ==
Ath Pavura was co-founded by Chandula Abeywickrama and Eranda Ginige (who is also the show's host) in 2015. The show aired its first season in September 2017. Ath Pavura is currently in its second season. Season two began airing in September 2018 and is ongoing.

== Investors ==
The impact investors on Ath Pavura are high net-worth individuals who are committed to investing in enterprises with a social and environmental impact while contributing their financial resources, time, and industry expertise.

Investors on Ath Pavura are referred to as ‘Tuskers’ to signify the protective nature elephants have for their young in the wild. The investors are the adult tuskers, guiding and nurturing the ‘young’ entrepreneurs, as they develop their business.

Investor	Designation
Chandula Abeywickrama	Chairperson Lanka Impact Investment Network and Co-Founder Ath Pavura
Sudarshan Ahangama	Group Finance Director MAS Holdings
Shiromal Cooray	Managing Director Jetwing Travels
Upul Deranagama	Chairman Horizon Group
Suresh De Mel	Managing Director Lanka Fishing Flies
Nirmal De Silva	Co-Founder/CEO Paramount Realty & Founder TYNA Consulting
Romani De Silva	Deputy Chairman/Managing Director Alliance Finance
Ajit Gunewardena	Founder and CEO Bluestone Capital (Pvt) Ltd.
Dulith Herath	Founder and Chairman Kapruka.com
Sandamini Perera	Deputy Chairperson Prime Lands Group
Harsha Purasinghe	Founder and CEO Microimage
Sujeewa Rajapakse	Managing Partner BDO Partners
Gamini Saparamadu	Chairman of the Board Kent Group of Companies

== Investments ==
On Ath Pavura, social and environmental entrepreneurs pitch to the panel of investors, to have their social enterprises funded. Social Enterprises are businesses that are solving social and environmental problems through creative business models, innovative products and services. If the social entrepreneur is successful in their pitch, entrepreneurs will receive an equity investment on the spot.

To date over Rs. 36,000,000 has been given in investments.

== Partners ==
The partnerships entered were in strategic in nature being in hand i hand with organizations that share the same ethos to develop social entrepreneurship in Sri Lanka.

Season 1

- Dialog
- Hatton National Bank
- Horizon Campus
- Wijeya Newspapers Ltd.

Season 2

- Horizon Campus
- Sampath Bank
- Sri Lanka Insurance Corporation

== Awards and recognition ==
In December 2018, Ath Pavura was recognized at the ZeroOne Digital Marketing Awards. Ath Pavura was honored with two awards: the Best Digital Integrated Campaign in the NGO category and the overall winner in the Best Digital Integrated Campaign category.
