= Win in China =

Chinese television series

Win in China (simplified Chinese: 赢在中国; traditional Chinese: 贏在中國; pinyin: Yíng Zài Zhōngguó) is a national reality television show in China. The show airs on CCTV-2 on Tuesday nights to a core audience of 20,000,000, and through re-broadcast, internet, and DVD has an extended audience of nearly 200,000,000. The premise of the show is entrepreneurs competing for investment into their projects and/or companies.

The emcee of the show, Wang Lifen, is also the executive producer. The judging panel includes major industry figures, including Jack Ma of Alibaba Group and Hugo Xiong of IDG Venture Capital.

The third season of Win in China aired in 2008. A record 150,000 entrepreneurs applied to compete. Both the winner and runner-up were women (Xie Li and Zeng Hua), a first for the show. 2008 also saw the entertaining participation of American Henry Winter (文亨利), the first foreigner to ever appear on the program. Winter, who finished 10th overall, proposed to his girlfriend on the show.

Win in China has also produced a successful line of books and DVDs, aggregating various judges' words of wisdom.
