= José Carlos Semenzato =

Brazilian entrepreneur (born 1968)

- Born: 1968 (age 57–58); Cafelândia, São Paulo, Brazil
- Occupation: Entrepreneur
- Known for: Founder of Microlins Language Schools and the multisetorial franchise holding SMZTO

José Carlos Semenzato (born 23 March 1968, in Cafelândia) is a Brazilian entrepreneur, investor, business magnate, financial advisor, stockbroker, and philanthropist . He is the current president of SMZTO Holding de Franquias Setoriais, a franchise holding that he founded in 2010 and has other affiliated companies.

== Biography ==
Son of a bricklayer and a housewife, Semenzato started working at the age of 13. At the time, he sold, in the suburb of Lins (a city in the hinterland of the state of São Paulo), snacks produced by his mother. At 16 years old, he became a manager in a copy company. After this experience, he worked in a construction company learning how to program computers. At 18, he started teaching computing to high school students at Instituto Americano de Lins. At 23 years old, Semenzato founded Microlins, a computing school.

In 1994, he owned 17 Microlins schools and, after that, he decided to start expanding through franchising.

In 2010, Microlins had 700 schools in 500 Brazilian cities and was sold to Grupo Multi in a transaction of R$110 million.

In 2012, Semenzato partnered with the Brazilian TV host Xuxa Meneghel to found Casa X, a franchise company for parties and social events. In 2015, the entrepreneur and Meneghel became partners in Espaçolaser, a franchise company specialized in laser hair removal. LifeUSA, an English school franchise, was founded in 2016 in partnership with the Brazilian tennis player Gustavo Kuerten.
