= Jari Sarasvuo =

Finnish businessman (born 1965)

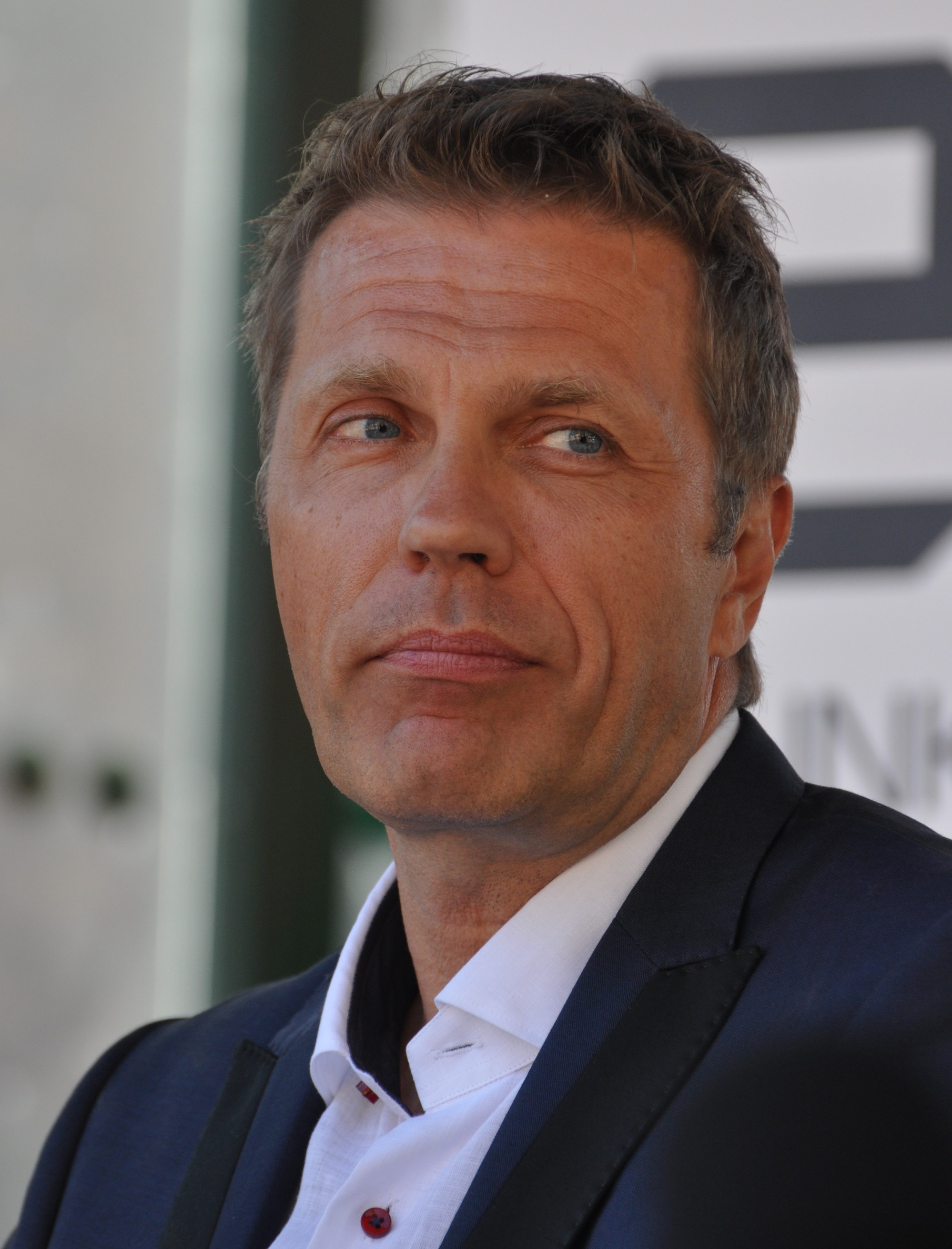
- Jari Sarasvuo in 2013
- Born: Jari Heinonen; 12 June 1965 (age 60); Turku, Finland
- Occupation: Television presenter
- Spouse: Virpi Sarasvuo

Jari Sarasvuo (born Jari Heinonen; 12 June 1965, in Turku) is the founder, chief owner and CEO of Trainers' House, a Finnish company that arranges training and lectures particularly for marketing topics.

Sarasvuo has worked as an editor and chief editor in several magazines and also in Helsinki's Radio City. His first publicity was as a host in a talk show called Hyvät, pahat ja rumat on the Finnish channel MTV3 in the 1990s. After leaving jobs in television, he has worked as a lecturer and as motivational coach, also publishing six books on the same topic. One of his famous concepts is the "inner hero" (sisäinen sankari), and he has also coined the term huomiotalous ("attention economy"), describing the central role of publicity in today's economy.

Sarasvuo studied business administration, but has not finished the degree. In his conscript duty, he was an editor of the army newspaper Ruotuväki, and was promoted to Second Lieutenant (vänrikki) in reserve.

Sarasvuo was the host in Diili, a localized version of The Apprentice. Sarasvuo has often appeared in publicity and his company hosted Bill Clinton's lecture in Tampere. Sarasvuo owns about a third of Trainer's House, and if evaluated, the stock is valued at some 34 million euros (January 2008). He has also contributed to charity in the form of providing microcredit and taking part in a project to support Bangladeshi women to become entrepreneurs.

Sarasvuo has been married to former cross-country skier Virpi Sarasvuo (née Kuitunen) since 2010. They have one child, a daughter born in 2011. Sarasvuo also has two children from a previous relationship.
