= Kyösti Kakkonen =

Finnish businessman

Kyösti Kakkonen (born December 7, 1956, in Kiihtelysvaara) is a Finnish businessman and millionaire. He is the co-founder and chief executive officer of the Finnish discount retail chain Tokmanni. Kakkonen is also an art collector.
