= 2023 in Australian television =

This is a list of Australian television-related events, debuts, finales, and cancellations that occurred in 2023, the 68th year of continuous operation of television in Australia.

== Events ==
=== January ===
Date	Event	Source
1	The ABC's coverage of the annual midnight Sydney New Year's Eve fireworks is watched by 985,000 viewers.	
16	Sarah Abo begins co-hosting the Nine Network's breakfast program Today, succeeding Allison Langdon.	
28	Veteran Seven Network sports presenter Pat Welsh signs off after 47 years based at the network's Brisbane studio.	
30	Allison Langdon begins her tenure as the host of Nine's A Current Affair, succeeding Tracy Grimshaw who departed at the end of 2022.	
30	Sam Mac is announced as the new host of Sydney Weekender, replacing Matt Shirvington.	

=== February ===
Date	Event	Source
27	After stepping down as the host of 7.30 in 2022, Leigh Sales returns to ABC TV as the new host of Australian Story which had been without a host since Caroline Jones left in 2016.	
28	New sketch show We Interrupt This Broadcast premieres on the Seven Network.	
28	Australian comedian Reuben Kaye delivers a controversial joke about Jesus during an appearance on The Project which prompts widespread criticism, and prompts hosts Waleed Aly and Sarah Harris to apologise the following night for the offence it caused to Muslim and Christian viewers.	

=== March ===
Date	Event	Source
19	Indira Naidoo begins hosting the long-running Compass program on ABC TV, succeeding Geraldine Doogue.	
26	Royston Sagigi-Baira wins the eighth season of Australian Idol with Phoebe Stewart the runner-up.	
27	Olympic pole vaulter Liz Parnov wins Australian Survivor: Heroes V Villains.	
27	Seven Network airs the 8,000th episode of Home and Away.	

=== April ===
Date	Event	Source
12	Southern Cross Austereo-owned GTS/BKN cancels its long-running regional news service effectively immediately. It is believed that some staff were not informed that the program would be aired for the last time that night until after it went to air. It ends over 50 years of news operations for the Spencer Gulf and Broken Hill regions, and leaves viewers with no local television news service.	
17	An episode of animated series Bluey entitled "Exercise" prompts criticism and accusations of fat shaming, which leads to the episode being edited.	
30	Former netballer Liz Ellis wins the ninth season of I'm a Celebrity...Get Me Out of Here! while boxer Harry Garside is runner-up. After flying back to Australia on 2 May, Garside is arrested by police at Sydney Airport and charged with assaulting his former partner on 1 March. The charges were withdrawn by police on 7 June.	

=== May ===
Date	Event	Source
1	The premiere of the fifteenth series of MasterChef Australia is pulled from the schedule by Network 10 just hours before it is due to air due to the sudden death of judge Jock Zonfrillo. After consultation with Zonfrillo's family, the series commences on 7 May 2023.	
6	The ABC is heavily criticised for their coverage of the Coronation of Charles III and Camilla on ABC TV, during which they held a panel discussion featuring three anti-monarchists including Q+A host Stan Grant, Australian Republican Movement chair Craig Foster and Indigenous writer and lawyer Teela Reid, and one monarchist Julian Leeser. The panel discussion prompted more than 1,800 complaints from viewers and an ombudsman's investigation, which found no breach of impartiality standards during the coverage. Grant also received racial abuse after his appearance on the panel which prompted him to step back from hosting Q+A.	

=== June ===
Date	Event	Source
2	After losing his civil defamation trial, Ben Roberts-Smith resigns from Seven West Media. He had been the general manager of regional network Seven Queensland since July 2015 before also being appointed as general manager of Seven Brisbane in 2016.	
9	After 21 years, David Koch co-hosts Seven Network breakfast program Sunrise for the final time. Koch is succeeded by Matt Shirvington.	
17	The Australian Broadcasting Corporation's managing director David Anderson announces a major restructure of the organisation in the new financial year, resulting in the loss of 120 jobs, the Sunday evening state-based ABC News bulletins on ABC TV being replaced with a single national bulletin and the abolition of the ABC's arts team. Among those to lose their jobs was national political editor Andrew Probyn whose position is made redundant. The ABC is widely condemned for the decisions.	
25	ABC TV's Sunday morning public affairs show Insiders signs off from the ABC's Melbourne studio for the final time, ahead of its relocation to the ABC's studio in Canberra.	
25	Seven News Sydney signs off its final bulletin at Martin Place studios, wrapping 19 years and 6,873 days of broadcast. From the next day, its new broadcast home is at a purpose-built studio at the Eveleigh headquarters. The new space is five-times larger than Martin Place, allows for permanent sets for all programs, with two complete control rooms and more than 40sq m of LED screens, while all newsroom operations will now be located on a second entire floor.	

=== July ===
Date	Event	Source
10	The Seven Network announces they have signed a two-year deal with Hockey Australia to broadcast all internationally sanctioned games played by the Kookaburras and Hockeyroos as well as all matches of the Hockey One league throughout 2023 and 2024.	
16	Brent Draper wins the 15th season of MasterChef Australia.	
18	Following the BBC’s revival of the British version of Gladiators, the Australian version of the show was confirmed to return for the second time and is set to be revived by Warner Bros. Television Studios.	
23	Weekend Sunrise becomes the final live television program to broadcast from the Seven Network's Martin Place studios as the network completes its relocation to its Eveleigh headquarters. The final editions of Sunrise and The Morning Show from Martin Place aired on 21 July while the final Seven News Sydney bulletin from Martin Place aired on 25 June.	
23	Phil Burton and dance partner Ash-Leigh Hunter win the twentieth series of Dancing with the Stars.	
24	The ABC announces that Stan Grant will not be returning to host Q+A with Patricia Karvelas confirmed as the program's host for the remainder of the year. It was also announced Dan Bourchier would soon be hosting a special edition of Q+A from the Garma Festival.	
30	Seven Network personality Sonia Kruger wins the Gold Logie at the 2023 Logie Awards held in Sydney. Kruger's win is criticised by several media commentators and Greens senator Mehreen Faruqi. All referred to Kruger's controversial remarks on the Nine Network's Today program in 2016 regarding immigration which the New South Wales Civil and Administrative Tribunal ruled as having vilified Muslims.	

=== August ===
Date	Event	Source
1	Paramount Networks UK & Australia rebrands its 10 Shake channel as Nickelodeon. This move sees Nick Jr and Nick@Nite brands and content seen on the channel and end the partnership between it and Foxtel.	
2	After receiving much criticism, the Australian Broadcasting Corporation announces it has reversed its earlier decision, deciding to retain the Sunday evening editions of the state-based ABC News bulletins on ABC TV.	
2	After last airing in 2009, improvised comedy show Thank God You're Here returns to Network 10 with new host Celia Pacquola.	
4	Eddie McGuire announces that Millionaire Hot Seat, the afternoon game show he has hosted since its debut in 2009, will be going into hiatus in January 2024, to be replaced with a new program produced in Melbourne.	
7	Australian animated children's program Bluey wins the TCA Award for Outstanding Achievement in Children's Programming at the 39th TCA Awards.	
10	The Nine Network announces that Millionaire Hot Seat will be replaced by Tipping Point Australia in 2024, hosted by former tennis champion Todd Woodbridge.	
15	After last airing in 2016, Kitchen Cabinet hosted by Annabel Crabb returns to ABC TV.	
16	The 2023 FIFA Women's World Cup semi-final between the Matildas and the Lionesses becomes the most watched television program since the OzTAM audience measuring commenced in 2001, with preliminary data showing a national average audience of 7.13 million watched the game.	
23	The 2023 reimagining of ABC TV's sitcom Mother and Son debuts, attracting a national metro audience of 441,000 viewers.	
24	Prime Minister Anthony Albanese officially opens the Seven Sydney's new newsroom and studio facility at the network's head office in South Eveleigh.	
29	After having last aired in 2018, Network 10 reboots Shark Tank with a completely new cast of "sharks", consisting of Sabri Suby, Catriona Wallace, Davie Fogarty, Jane Lu, and Robert Herjavec.	
31	60 of Pluto TV's FAST channels launch on 10 Play.	

=== September ===
Date	Event	Source
6	Nine Entertainment holds their Upfronts in Sydney where they officially reveal the commentary teams for their Olympics and Paralympics coverage. The network also confirms a local version of Tipping Point hosted by Todd Woodbridge will air on Nine in 2024 as will a reboot of an Australian version of Jeopardy!. Nine also confirms the return of former A Current Affair host Tracy Grimshaw in an undisclosed project.	
7	The Australian Broadcasting Corporation admits it breached its own policies pertaining to the licensing of its archival television footage for political purposes after it's discovered the ABC's commercial arm licensed footage from the 1967 referendum to be used in Uluru Dialogue's advertisement for the 2023 referendum featuring John Farnham's hit song You're the Voice. That same footage was also inexplicably watermarked with a logo belonging to private company Australian Television Archive despite owner James Paterson stating that he had "nothing to do with the campaign, the agency or have any connection whatsoever to the footage our logo was placed on".	
10	Juanita Phillips reads her final ABC News New South Wales bulletin on ABC TV in Sydney after 21 years. She is succeeded by Jeremy Fernandez.	
18	Neighbours returns to Network 10, after its axing in 2022. It also debuts on Amazon Freevee.	
26	Foxtel rebrands most of their channels except Fox8 and Fox Sports, with a non-Fox branding and with Fox8, but without Fox Sports, a new logo.	
28	Foxtel rebrands most of their channels except Fox8 and Fox Sports, with a non-Fox branding and with Fox8, but without Fox Sports, a new logo.	
29	Nakari Thorpe and Lydia Feng are appointed weekend anchors for ABC TV in Sydney, to present the weekend ABC News New South Wales 7 pm bulletin.	

=== October ===
Date	Event	Source
3	Identical twins Radha and Prabha win the thirteenth series of My Kitchen Rules.	
5	The main Tasmanian TV channels (ABC, SBS, 10 Tasmania, SCA Seven and WIN) changes to MPEG-4 HD. SD simulcasts remain on LCNs 21, 30, 51, 61, and 88.	
8	Tarryn Stokes wins the twelfth season of The Voice.	
9	Neighbours moves to a 4 pm time slot, which results in The Bold & The Beautiful moving to its original 4:30 pm time slot.	
18	Seven West Media hold their 2024 upfronts in Sydney, with major new programs hosted by Chris Brown.	
18	Television journalist and former I'm a Celebrity...Get Me Out of Here! contestant Natasha Exelby appears in Melbourne Magistrates' Court, where she is fined $2000, disqualified from driving for 22 months and had her licence cancelled after crashing into a parked car at Toorak while having a BAC of .220. However, no conviction was recorded.	
22	The Nine Network announces that the ABC's former political editor Andrew Probyn is joining Nine as the national affairs editor.	
24	Network 10 / Paramount ANZ hold their 2024 upfronts in Sydney where they reveal: Ready Steady Cook will be rebooted with Miguel Maestre as host; Deal of No Deal will be revived with Grant Denyer as host; new episodes of Wheel of Fortune will be filmed in the UK with Graham Norton as host; and Robert Irwin will co-host I'm a Celebrity...Get Me Out of Here!. They also announce a new judging line up for MasterChef Australia with Poh Ling Yeow, Sofia Levin and Jean-Christophe Novelli joining returning judge Andy Allen. It is also announced that Top Gear Australia will be rebooted to stream on Paramount+, hosted by Blair Joscelyne, Beau Ryan and Jonathan LaPaglia.	

=== November ===
Date	Event	Source
7	Dami Im wins the fifth season of The Masked Singer Australia. Darren Hayes is the runner-up and Conrad Sewell places third.	
9	Darren McMullen and his nephew Tristan Dougan win The Amazing Race Australia: Celebrity Edition. They decide to share the $100,000 prize money with the other two charities nominated by the remaining two teams (Alli Simpson's team and Emma Watkins' team)	
14	It is announced Network 10's morning program Studio 10 would be ending its 10-year run on 22 December 2023, after more than 2500+ episodes.	
18	The Nine Network announces that Alicia Loxley and Tom Steinfort would be replacing long-serving anchor Peter Hitchener as the weeknight news presenter on Nine News Melbourne in 2024 - with Hitchener moving to the weekend bulletins.	
20	Three Australian television programs win their categories at the 51st International Emmy Awards in New York: Harley & Katya for Best Sports Documentary, Built to Survive for Kids: Factual, and Heartbreak High for Kids: Live Action.	
20	It is announced Fast Ed would be departing the Seven Network's lifestyle program Better Homes and Gardens after almost twenty years, with the final edition in which he appears scheduled to air on 1 December.	
22	Bruce Lehrmann settles his defamation case against the Australian Broadcasting Corporation which the ABC says was "settled on mutually acceptable, confidential terms, without admission of liability". However, Lehrmann continues his defamation action against Network 10 and Lisa Wilkinson which commences in the Federal Court in Sydney.	
22	The Australian Transport Safety Bureau releases its findings into the helicopter crash in February 2022, in which Outback Wrangler star Willow Wilson was killed in West Arnhem Land, concluding that fuel exhaustion was the likely cause.	
29	The final episode of Millionaire Hot Seat airs on the Nine Network.	
30	Peter Hitchener reads his final weeknight edition of Nine News Melbourne.	

=== December ===
Date	Event	Source
4	International Cricket Council announce that Amazon Prime Video had secured the exclusive broadcast rights for all ICC tournament matches, commencing in 2024. The announcement comes after federal communications minister Michelle Rowland introduces proposed new anti-siphoning laws to parliament, requiring free to air networks to be offered first refusal for major sporting events. The decision to award the rights to the ICC tournament cricket matches to a streaming service is criticised by lobby group FreeTV Australia, who call for the changes to the anti-siphoning rules laws to be fast-tracked.	
7	It is announced that the CEO of Seven West Media, James Warburton will step down from the role at the end of the financial year and will be succeeded by Jeff Howard.	
7	After appearing in Darwin Local Court for a brief committal hearing, the star of Outback Wrangler and Wild Croc Territory Matt Wright is committed to stand trial in the Northern Territory Supreme Court on a charge of attempting to pervert the course of justice, which is related to the fatal helicopter crash in 2022 in which his co-star Chris "Willow" Wilson was killed. Wright strenuously denies all charges.	
12	Network 10 confirms the 10 News First: Perth bulletin anchored by Natalie Forrest would continue to be broadcast live from its Subiaco studio in Perth in 2024.	
15	Last episode of The Drum goes to air after a run of 13 years. The three main presenters Julia Baird, Dan Bourchier and Ellen Fanning will all remain with the ABC.	
17	It is reported that after 17 years ABC News presenter Karina Carvalho would be leaving the Australian Broadcasting Corporation.	
21	Warren Mundine receives a formal apology from SBS after its ombudsman Amy Stockwell found NITV's The Point: Australia Decides program hosted by Narelda Jacobs on the night of the 2023 Australian Indigenous Voice referendum twice breached the broadcaster's Code of Conduct. During the program which featured Mundine and Marcia Langton as panelists, Jacobs was found to have given the impression that one perspective had been unduly favoured when she criticised Mundine and described Langton as a "national treasure". Stockwell also finds the program failed to provide an opportunity for Mundine to respond to a significant claim by Langton about Mundine's business when his microphone was muted.	
22	The final edition of Network 10's morning program Studio 10 goes to air.	

== Premieres ==
=== Domestic series ===
List of domestic television series premieres
Program	Original airdate	Network	Source
Crazy Fun Park	1 January	ABC Me	
Black Snow	1 January	Stan	
Koala Man	9 January	Disney+	
Taskmaster Australia	2 February	Network 10	
We Interrupt This Broadcast	28 February	Seven Network	
Dawn of the Dolphins	6 March	Stan	
Alone Australia	29 March	SBS	
Wellmania	29 March	Netflix	
Aunty Donna's Coffee Cafe	12 April	ABC TV	
Asking For It	20 April	SBS	
The 1% Club	26 April	Seven Network	
The Summit	14 May	Nine Network	
Blow Up	15 May	Seven Network	
The Clearing	24 May	Disney+	
Million Dollar Island	12 June	Seven Network	
Rush	2 July	Nine Network	
Heat	11 July (UK) 4 October (Australia)	Channel 5/Network 10	
The Lost Flowers of Alice Hart	4 August	Amazon Prime Video	
Mother and Son	23 August	ABC TV	
NCIS: Sydney	10 November	Paramount+	
Faraway Downs	26 November	Disney+	
The Artful Dodger	29 November	Disney+	
Paper Dolls	3 December	Paramount+	

== Television channels ==
=== New channels/streaming services ===
Date	Channel
15 January	7Bravo
1 March	Real Life
1 July	Gecko (in Southern Cross Austereo areas)

=== Rebranding channels/streaming services ===
Date	Old name	New name	Reference
1 August	10 Shake	Nickelodeon	
26 September	Fox Docos	Docos	
26 September	Fox Sleuth	Sleuth	
26 September	Fox Classics	Classics	
26 September	Fox Comedy	Comedy	
26 September	Fox Sci-Fi	Sci-Fi	
28 September	Fox One	Foxtel One	
28 September	Fox Crime	Crime	
28 September	Fox Showcase	Showcase	
28 September	Fox Arena	Arena	

=== Closed channels ===
Date	Name	Reference
31 January	E!	
1 March	Fox Funny	
1 March	Nat Geo Wild	
1 March	National Geographic	
30 June	PBS Kids	
1 August	Nickelodeon (Foxtel only)	
1 August	Nick Jr. (Foxtel only)	
1 November	Foxtel Movies Kids	

== Programming changes ==
=== Changes to network affiliation ===
Criterion for inclusion in the following list is that Australian premiere episodes will air in Australia for the first time on a new channel. This includes when a program is moved from a free-to-air network's primary channel to a digital multi-channel, as well as when a program moves between subscription television channels – provided the preceding criterion is met. Ended television series which change networks for repeat broadcasts are not included in the list.

List of domestic television series which changed network affiliation
Program	Date	New network	Previous network	Source

List of international television programs which changed network affiliation
Program	Date	New network	Previous network	Country of origin	Source
Doctor Who	2023	Disney+	ABC	United Kingdom	

=== Free-to-air premieres ===
This is a list of programs which made their premiere on Australian free-to-air television that had previously premiered on Australian subscription television. Programs may still air on the original subscription television network.

List of international television programs which premiered on free-to-air television for the first time
Program	Date	Free-to-air network	Subscription network(s)	Country of origin	Source

=== Subscription premieres ===
This is a list of programs which made their debut on Australian subscription television, having previously premiered on Australian free-to-air television. Programs may still air (first or repeat) on the original free-to-air television network.

List of domestic television programs which premiered on subscription television for the first time
Program	Date	Free-to-air network	Subscription network(s)	Source

=== Returning programs ===
Australian produced programs which are returning with a new season after being absent from television from the previous calendar year.

Program	Return date	Previous run	Type of return	Previous channel	New/same channel	Source
Australian Idol	30 January	2003–2009	Revival	Network 10	Seven Network	
Location Location Location Australia	30 June	2012–2014	Revival	Lifestyle	Network 10	
Thank God You're Here	2 August	2006–2009	Revival	Seven Network	Network 10	
Kitchen Cabinet	15 August	2012–2016	Revival	ABC TV	same	
Shark Tank	29 August	2015–2018	Revival	Network 10	same	
Neighbours	18 September	1985–2022	Revival	10 Peach	Network 10	

=== Endings ===
List of domestic television series endings
Program	End date	Network(s)	Start date	Source
We Interrupt This Broadcast	26 April 2023	Seven Network	28 February 2023	
Blow Up	6 June 2023	Seven Network	15 May 2023	
Five Bedrooms	18 June 2023	Network 10/Paramount+	15 May 2019	
The Clearing	5 July 2023	Disney+/Hulu	24 May 2023	
Heat	14 July 2023 (UK) 25 October 2023 (Australia)	Channel 5/Network 10	11 July 2023 (UK) 4 October 2023 (Australia)	
Million Dollar Island	26 July 2023	Seven Network	12 June 2023	
Rush	26 July 2023	Nine Network	2 July 2023	
The Lost Flowers of Alice Hart	1 September 2023	Amazon Prime Video	4 August 2023	
The Masked Singer	7 November 2023	Network 10	23 September 2019	
Millionaire Hot Seat	29 November 2023	Nine Network	20 April 2009	
The Drum	15 December 2023	ABC TV/ABC News	23 July 2010	
The Bachelor	20 December 2023	Network 10	8 September 2013	
Studio 10	22 December 2023	Network 10	4 November 2013	
Flashpoint	2023	Seven Network (only in Perth)	2 September 2019	

== Deaths ==
Name	Date of death	Age	Broadcasting notability	Reference
Garry Stewart	1 January	aged 85	Known for his long career at GTV-9 Melbourne including the producer of In Melbourne Tonight.	
Dennis Smith	3 January	not given	Veteran television producer for The Go!! Show and a theatrical entrepreneur.	
Diana "Bubbles" Fisher	26 January	aged 91	Media personality and journalist, known for her reports on the British royal family and a panelist on the ABC series The Inventors.	
Gary Fenton	1 February	not given	Sports media executive, known for his work with both the Seven Network and the Nine Network.	
George Miller	17 February	aged 79	Scottish-born Australian television and film director, best known for The Man from Snowy River.	
Jeff Watson	22 February	aged 80	British-born Australian journalist, reporter, presenter and producer, hosting Towards 2000 / Beyond 2000 from 1981 to 1990 and Getaway from 1992 to 1998. He also reported for This Day Tonight, Four Corners and Holiday.	
Chris Colquhoun	7 March	aged 43	SBS World News cameraman	
Brian Walsh	16 March	aged 67	Media executive, known for his work with Network Ten, the Nine Network and Foxtel, was also an entertainment and sports publicist.	
Peter Hardy	16 March	aged 66	Television actor, best known for McLeod's Daughters.	
Terry Norris	20 March	aged 92	Theatre, radio, TV and film actor. Appeared in rural series Bellbird as Joe Turner and Cop Shop as Senior Sargeant Terry O'Reilly, Norris also had a ten-year stint in politics.	
Swami Saravati	27 March	Age unknown (possibly late 70's)	Indian-Australian, who was a noted pioneering Yoga teacher, and one of the first multicultural personalities on Australian television in the 1960s and 1970s, with her yoga programs under her name.	
Doug Mulray	30 March	aged 71	TV and radio host, best known as "The Beast" in Network Ten and Foxtel talk show series Beauty and the Beast. Also host of the infamous Australia's Naughtiest Home Videos series that was cancelled after one episode.	
Maxine Klibingaitis	18 April	aged 58	Known for her role in Prisoner as Bobbie Mitchell and Neighbours as Terry Inglis.	
Bob Maguire	19 April	aged 88	Catholic priest and media personality, co-hosting the SBS series Speaking in Tongues with John Safran.	
Barry Humphries (AC, CBE)	22 April	aged 89	Legendary comedian, (also worked in the United Kingdom) active in theatre, TV and film, known for characters Dame Edna Everage, Sir Les Patterson and Sandy Stone also created comic strip character Barry McKenzie.	
Kevin Sanders	22 April	aged 87	Australian journalist and documentary filmmaker, who was the first voice of CNN. Began his media career in Canberra at Nine News alongside Eric Pearce. Went on to move to Los Angeles as anchor for KTLA and became the science reporter at CNN.	
Jock Zonfrillo	30 April	aged 46	Chef and judge of MasterChef Australia	
Rolf Harris	10 May	aged 93	Australian entertainer, comedian, musician, singer-songwriter and painter, also worked in the United Kingdom	
Mary Parker	13 May	aged 92	English Australian actress, started her career in her native country as a performer of stage and screen, in Australia she became the first female presenter on Melbourne television in 1956.	
Ray Wilkie (OAM)	18 May	aged 98	Australian meteorologist and television weather presenter, best known for reporting bulletins at the ABC, Nine Network and Network 10.	
Joy McKean (OAM)	25 May	aged 93	Singer-songwriter and wife and manager of Slim Dusty, mother of singer Anne Kirkpatrick, appeared in biopic TV movie documentaries.	
Mac Gudgeon	30 May	aged 74	Australian screenwriter.	
Noeline Donaher	May	not given	Sylvania Waters star.	
Judi Farr (AM)	29 June	aged 84	Actress, comedian known for My Name's McGooley, What's Yours?, series spin-off, Rita and Wally as well as Kingswood Country, Please Like Me and A Place to Call Home	
Alan Wilkie	10 July	aged 94	Australian meteorologist and radio and television weather presenter, best known for his bulletins at the ABC (1956–1960), the Seven Network (1968–1976) and the Nine Network (1977–2001)	
Ron Barassi	16 September	aged 87	AFL football legend, who had a notable career in media	
Joy Chambers	17 September	aged 76	Actress who appeared in numerous television series including The Restless Years, The Young Doctors and Rosemary Daniels in Neighbours	
Cal Wilson	11 October	aged 53	Actress and comedian	
Leslie Dayman	20 October	aged 90	TV soap opera/serial actor appeared in Homicide, Prisoner, Sons and Daughters and E Street.	
Johnny Ruffo	10 November	aged 35	Singer, actor (Chris Harrington on Home and Away) and contestant of The X Factor Australia	
Nan Witcomb	17 November	aged 95	Australian poet who wrote for the 1960s satirical comedy series The Mavis Bramston Show.	
James Davern	18 November	aged 90	Creator and producer of the TV series A Country Practice	
Bill Granger	25 December	aged 54	Celebrity chef	
Nick Beaney	28 December	aged 61	Seven News cameraman	
John Pilger	31 December	aged 84	Documentary maker and journalist	
