= Rush (2023 TV series) =

Australian reality competition series

- Genre: Reality competition
- Presented by: David Genat
- Country of origin: Australia
- Original language: English
- No. of seasons: 1
- No. of episodes: 9

Production
- Camera setup: Multi-camera
- Production company: Endemol Shine Australia

Original release
- Network: Nine Network
- Release: 2 July – 25 July 2023

Rush is an Australian travel adventure series which features 12 contestants, divided into three teams, racing to complete tasks in various countries. The last team to complete each episode's tasks must vote to eliminate one of their members until the last individual standing wins the $100,000 grand prize and two first-class tickets for a trip around the world. The series, hosted by model and former Australian Survivor contestant David Genat, premiered on Nine on 2 July 2023.

On 14 September 2023, Nine cancelled the series after one season.

== Format ==
Rush features 12 contestants divided into three teams of four. Each episode, teams are taken to an unknown starting location known as a "Drop Zone", often in the middle of a local celebration, wearing noise-cancelling headphones and blackout goggles. After removing their goggles and headphones to start the race, teams receive a cryptic clue on their smart watches from host David Genat about his location, and must find him to receive further instructions. After finding David, teams receive a dossier containing information about the "Escape Zone", the location they must reach at the end of the leg. However, teams must also complete one or two missions along the way, and check-in at a specified accommodation to spend the night, as listed on the dossiers.

Teams begin each leg with basic supplies and limited local currency to complete each leg's tasks and travel to the required destinations. The last team to reach the Escape Zone must vote off one of their team members until one contestant remains to be crowned the winner of the series. Tied votes or teams with two members placing last are decided by a game of chance called "Rush Roulette".

== Cast ==
The series features 12 contestants divided into three teams of four.

Contestants	Age	Team	Status
Hamish Collins	29	Scarlet	Winner
CK	28	Gold	Finalist
Sofia Ligeros	26	Navy	Finalist
Adam Vassallo	22	Scarlet	Eliminated / 4th place
Tylen Wallace	21	Navy	Eliminated / 5th place
Lola Calistamon	25	Gold	Eliminated / 6th place
Fiona Ruscoe	57	Scarlet	Eliminated / 7th place
Tommy Kende	46	Navy	Withdrew / 8th place
Saxon Gallaher	32	Gold	Eliminated / 9th place
Madeline "Madi" Mercieca	33	Navy	Eliminated / 10th place
Priscilla Sleep	38	Gold	Eliminated / 11th place
Najmah Adan	26	Scarlet	Eliminated / 12th place

== Results ==
The following teams are listed with their placements in each leg. Placements are listed in finishing order.

Team placement (by leg)
Team	1	2	3	4	5	6	7	8	9
Team Scarlet	3rd	1st	2nd	1st	3rd	1st	2nd	3rd	1st
Team Gold	2nd	3rd	1st	3rd	1st	3rd	1st	1st (Note: Sofia (Team Navy) & CK (Team Gold) checked-in at the Escape Zone together and shared first place.)	2nd
Team Navy	1st	2nd	3rd	2nd	2nd	2nd	3rd	1st	3rd

== Race summary ==
=== Leg 1 (Brazil) ===
Locations

- Rio de Janeiro, Brazil (Rio Carnival) (Drop Zone)
- Rio de Janeiro (Christ the Redeemer)
- Rio de Janeiro (Copacabana Beach – Royal Rio Palace Hotel)
- Rio de Janeiro (Rocinha)
- Paraty (Pousada da Condessa)
- Paraty-Mirim State Park (Paca Beach) (Escape Zone)

Episode summary

- Teams began the leg in the middle of the Rio Carnival in Rio de Janeiro and received a cryptic clue to the location of host David Genat, which they had to figure out was the Christ the Redeemer statue.
- Teams spent the night at the Royal Rio Palace Hotel and departed the following morning in the order they finished the first day.
- In Rocinha, teams had to organise a soccer game and score one goal against locals.
- In Paraty, teams had to check-in at the Pousada da Condessa hotel where they would spend the night. Teams departed the hotel the following morning in the order they checked in.
- At Paraty-Mirim State Park, teams had to find a hiking trail and follow it to the Escape Zone at Paca Beach.
- At the Escape Zone, Team Scarlet, which had arrived last, unanimously chose Najmah for elimination as they felt she would be a liability physically in the future, as she had struggled with the hike to the beach.

=== Leg 2 (Turkey) ===
Locations

- Istanbul, Turkey (Süleymaniye Mosque) (Drop Zone)
- Istanbul (Basilica Cistern)
- Bursa (Turkish Bathhouse)
- Yıldırım district (Cumalıkızık)
- Çanakkale (Çanakkale waterfront – Trojan Horse statue) (Escape Zone)

Episode summary

- Teams began the leg at the Süleymaniye Mosque in Istanbul and received a cryptic clue to the location of host David Genat, which they had to figure out was the Basilica Cistern.
- In Bursa, teams had to find a Turkish Bathhouse and undergo a traditional hammam.
- In Cumalıkızık, teams had to buy or obtain traditional Turkish delight which they then had to deliver to the Escape Zone in Çanakkale.

=== Leg 3 (Jordan) ===
Locations

- Aqaba Governorate, Jordan (Wadi Rum Desert) (Drop Zone)
- Aqaba Governorate (Wadi Rum Desert — Pyramid Rock)
- Aqaba Governorate (Wadi Rum Desert — Bedouin Camp)
- Petra (High Place of Sacrifice)
- Petra (The Monastery) (Escape Zone)

Episode summary

- Each team began the leg at different points in the Wadi Rum Desert and received a cryptic clue to the location of host David Genat, which they had to figure out was the Pyramid Rock. Teams would find a map and compass in their backpacks which they had to use to navigate eight kilometres to Pyramid Rock.
- After finding David Genat at Pyramid Rock, teams had to search the desert for a Bedouin camp and convince the owner to allow them to spend the night. Teams would depart the following morning in the order they finished the first day. Teams unable to find a Bedouin camp by nightfall had to spend the night sleeping in the desert outside.
- Once in Petra, teams had to climb 900 steps to the High Place of Sacrifice and photograph the circular stone altar then proceed to the Escape Zone at The Monastery.

=== Leg 4 (India) ===
Locations

- Pushkar, India (Holi Festival) (Drop Zone)
- Jaipur (Hawa Mahal)
- Samode (Samode Palace)
- Deshnoke (Karni Mata Temple)
- Gajner (Gajner Palace) (Escape Zone)

Episode summary

- Teams began the leg in the middle of the Holi Festival in Pushkar and received a cryptic clue to the location of host David Genat, which they had to figure out was the Hawa Mahal in Jaipur and travel there by train. Teams would depart the following morning in the order they found David Genat.
- For the second day, teams had to purchase Indian wedding attire for each member in Jaipur, then attend a wedding at the Samode Palace in Samode and take a selfie with the bride and groom. Teams would depart the following morning in the order they finished.
- For the third day, teams had to travel to the Karni Mata Temple and give an offering to the locals of the temple which, unbeknownst to them, were the rats which were considered sacred. Afterwards, teams could proceed to the Escape Zone at Gajner Palace in Gajner.

Additional note

- CK was unable to participate in the leg with Team Gold for personal reasons. As a result, a vote was not held when Team Gold finished the leg in last place and a game of chance called "Rush Roulette" was held. Lola and Saxon each had to choose one of three flares, with the unselected flare assigned to CK in his absence. The two contestants with the flares which lit with green smoke were safe while the contestant who had the flare which lit red was eliminated.

=== Leg 5 (Thailand) ===
Locations

- Bangkok, Thailand (Khao San Road) (Drop Zone)
- Bangkok (Banyan Tree Hotel – Vertigo Rooftop)
- Bangkok (New Siam II Hotel)
- Bangkok (Suvarnabhumi Airport)
- Tai Romyen National Park (Khamin Cave)
- Ao Nang (Ao Nang Beach)
- Ao Nang (Ko Kai) (Escape Zone)

Episode summary

- Teams began the leg on Khao San Road in Bangkok and received a cryptic clue to the location of host David Genat, which they had to figure out was the Vertigo Rooftop of the Banyan Tree Hotel.
- After finding David Genat, teams found a cryptic clue in their dossiers to the name of the hotel they had to check-in and spend the night. They had to figure out the clue gave them the name "New Siam", however there were many hotels in the locality with "New Siam" in the name and they had to find the correct one: New Siam II Hotel. Teams departed the hotel the following morning in the order they checked in.
- At the start of the second day, teams had to travel to Suvarnabhumi Airport and board a flight to Krabi. Teams would depart the following day in the order they arrived at Suvarnabhumi Airport.
- At the start of the third day, teams had to travel to the Khamin Cave in the Tai Romyen National Park and find a garland hidden inside which they then had to deliver to the Escape Zone in Ao Nang.
- At Ao Nang Beach, teams had to board a long-tail boat to the escape zone on Ko Kai island, known as Chicken Island due to a distinctive rock formation which looks like the head of a chicken.
- Team Scarlet got lost trying to find the Khamin Cave. Before they managed to find the cave and retrieve the garland, they were told to meet David at the Swordfish Sculpture on Ao Nang Beach as the other two teams had already finished.
- At the Escape Zone, Fiona volunteered herself for elimination, leaving Hamish and Adam as the remaining two members of Team Scarlet.

Additional note

- Tommy withdrew from the competition before the start of the leg for personal reasons.

=== Leg 6 (Ireland) ===
- Dublin, Ireland (Saint Patrick's Day Parade)
- Dublin (Suffolk Street – Molly Malone statue)
- Cork (Hayfield Manor Hotel)
- Blarney (Blarney Castle – Blarney Stone)
- County Clare (Cliffs of Moher)

Episode summary

- Teams began the leg in the middle of the Saint Patrick's Day Parade in Dublin and received a cryptic clue to the location of host David Genat, which they had to figure out was the Molly Malone statue. However, teams also had to obtain a pint of Guinness and a live shamrock, while not yet being provided any money, to deliver to the statue.
- After finding David Genat, teams had to check-in at the Hayfield Manor Hotel in Cork where they would spend the night. Teams departed the hotel the following morning in the order they checked in.
- At Blarney Castle, teams had to kiss the Blarney Stone built into the castle battlements. Afterwards, regardless of whether they had any money remaining, teams had to hitchhike to the Escape Zone at the Cliffs of Moher.

Additional note

- As Team Gold came in last and only had two team members, the "Rush Roulette" was held. CK and Lola each had to choose one of two flares. The contestant with the flare which lit with green smoke, CK, was safe while the contestant who had the flare which lit red, Lola, was eliminated.

=== Leg 7 (France) ===
Locations

- Huez, France (Alpe d'Huez – Tomorrowland Winter Festival) (Drop Zone)
- Huez (Alpe d'Huez – Ice Rink)
- Grenoble (Hotel d'Angleterre)
- Lyon (Shops)
- Paris (Mecure Hotel)
- Maintenon (Château de Maintenon)
- Paris (Pont de Bir-Hakeim) (Escape Zone)

Episode summary

- Teams began the leg in the middle of the Tomorrowland Winter Festival at the Alpe d'Huez ski resort in Huez and received a cryptic clue to the location of host David Genat, which they had to figure out was the resort's ice rink.
- After finding David Genat, teams had to check-in at the Hotel d'Angleterre in Grenoble where they would spend the first night. Teams departed the hotel the following morning in the order they checked in.
- In Lyon, teams had to buy a raw andouillette, a French sausage containing pig intestine, and find someone to cook it for them. Once complete, teams had to find a local to eat the cooked andouillette with to complete the mission.
- After the mission in Lyon, teams had to solve a cryptic clue in their dossier to figure out the name of the hotel they had to check-in at for the second night: the Mercure Hotel in Paris. Teams departed the hotel the following morning in the order they checked in.
- At the Château de Maintenon, teams had to photograph four portraits of Madame de Maintenon. Once complete, teams had to solve a cryptic clue in their dossier for location of the Escape Zone they had to get to: the Pont de Bir-Hakeim in Paris.

Additional note

- As Team Navy came in last and only had two team members, the "Rush Roulette" was held. Sofia and Tylen each had to choose one of two flares. The contestant with the flare which lit with green smoke, Sofia, was safe while the contestant who had the flare which lit red, Tylen, was eliminated.

=== Leg 8 (Kenya) ===
Locations

- Kajiado County, Kenya (Nassaroni Village) (Drop Zone)
- Kimana (Kimana Sanctuary – Acacia tree)
- Kimana (Kimana Town)
- Kajiado County (Nassaroni Village)
- Kajiado County (Suntai's Maasai Villages)
- Amboseli National Park (Amboseli Airstrip) (Escape Zone)

Episode summary

- Teams began the leg in the middle of an Adumu dance by the Maasai people at Nassaroni Village and received a cryptic clue to the location of host David Genat, which they had to figure out was the oldest Acacia Tree of the Kimana Sanctuary, and drive themselves there using provided vehicles they would find at the nearby roadside.
- After finding David Genat, teams had to purchase a goat in Kimana and deliver it to another Nassaroni Village as a gift. After presenting the goat, teams had to take a sip of goat blood before spending the night at the village, and would depart the following morning in the order they finished.
- The following morning, teams had to render one or two walls (depending on the number of team members) of a Maasai village hut with a mixture of sand, ash and cow dung. Once approved by the Maasai people, teams had to solve a cryptic clue to the location of the Escape Zone they had to reach: the Amboseli Airstrip within the Amboseli National Park which could only be accessed by vehicle.

Additional note

- As Team Scarlet came in last and only had two team members, the "Rush Roulette" was held. Adam and Hamish each had to choose one of two flares. The contestant with the flare which lit with green smoke, Hamish, was safe while the contestant who had the flare which lit red, Adam, was eliminated.

=== Leg 9 (South Africa) ===
Locations

- Garden Route National Park, South Africa (Bloukrans Bridge) (Drop Zone)
- George (Redberry Farm Hedge Maze)
- Mossel Bay (Oceans Hotel)
- Cape Town (Cape Farms – Skydive Cape Town)
- Cape Town (Table Mountain – Platteklip Gorge Trail)
- Cape Town (Victoria & Alfred Waterfront – Nobel Square)
- Cape Town (AGA Black River Helistop) (Escape Zone)

Episode summary

- Teams began the leg at the Bloukrans Bridge in the Garden Route National Park and had to complete a bungee jump off the bridge to receive a cryptic clue to the location of host David Genat, which they had to figure out was the Redberry Farm Hedge Maze in George. Teams who refused to jump would have to wait one hour before they were sent the clue.
- After finding David Genat, teams had to check-in at the Oceans Hotel in Mossel Bay where they would spend the night. Teams departed the hotel the following morning in the order they checked in.
- At Skydive Cape Town, teams had to complete a tandem skydive.
- At the base of Table Mountain, teams had to find the Platteklip Gorge Trail and follow it to the summit of the mountain. Upon arrival, teams would receive a cryptic clue on their smart watches to their next location, which they had to figure out was the Nelson Mandela statue at Nobel Square.
- At Nobel Square, teams would find one of three flares: one which would light with green smoke and two that would light with red smoke when lit. The first team to arrive at Nobel Square would receive the winning green flare, leaving the remaining two flares for the other teams. Teams would then be driven to the Escape Zone where the flares would be lit to reveal the winner of the season.

== Ratings ==
No.	Title	Air date	Timeslot	Overnight ratings		Consolidated ratings		Total viewers	Ref(s)
No.	Title	Air date	Timeslot	Viewers	Rank	Viewers	Rank	Total viewers	Ref(s)
1	Episode 1	2 July 2023	Sunday 7:30pm	301,000	14	240,000	13	301,000	
2	Episode 2	3 July 2023	Monday 7:30pm	292,000	18	182,000	18	532,000	
3	Episode 3	4 July 2023	Tuesday 7:30pm	268,000	19	198,000	18	466,000	
4	Episode 4	10 July 2023	Monday 7:30pm	297,000	18	208,000	18	505,000	
5	Episode 5	11 July 2023	Tuesday 7:30pm	281,000	16	283,000	17	484,000	
6	Episode 6	17 July 2023	Monday 7:30pm	256,000	20	213,000	18	469,000	
7	Episode 7	18 July 2023	Tuesday 7:30pm	242,000	20	213,000	18	455,000	
8	Episode 8	24 July 2023	Monday 7:30pm	239,000	>20	—N/a	—N/a	239,000	
9	Episode 9	25 July 2023	Tuesday 7:30pm	270,000	18	—N/a	—N/a	270,000	

== See also ==
- The Amazing Race Australia
