= Cumalıkızık =

- Neighbourhood
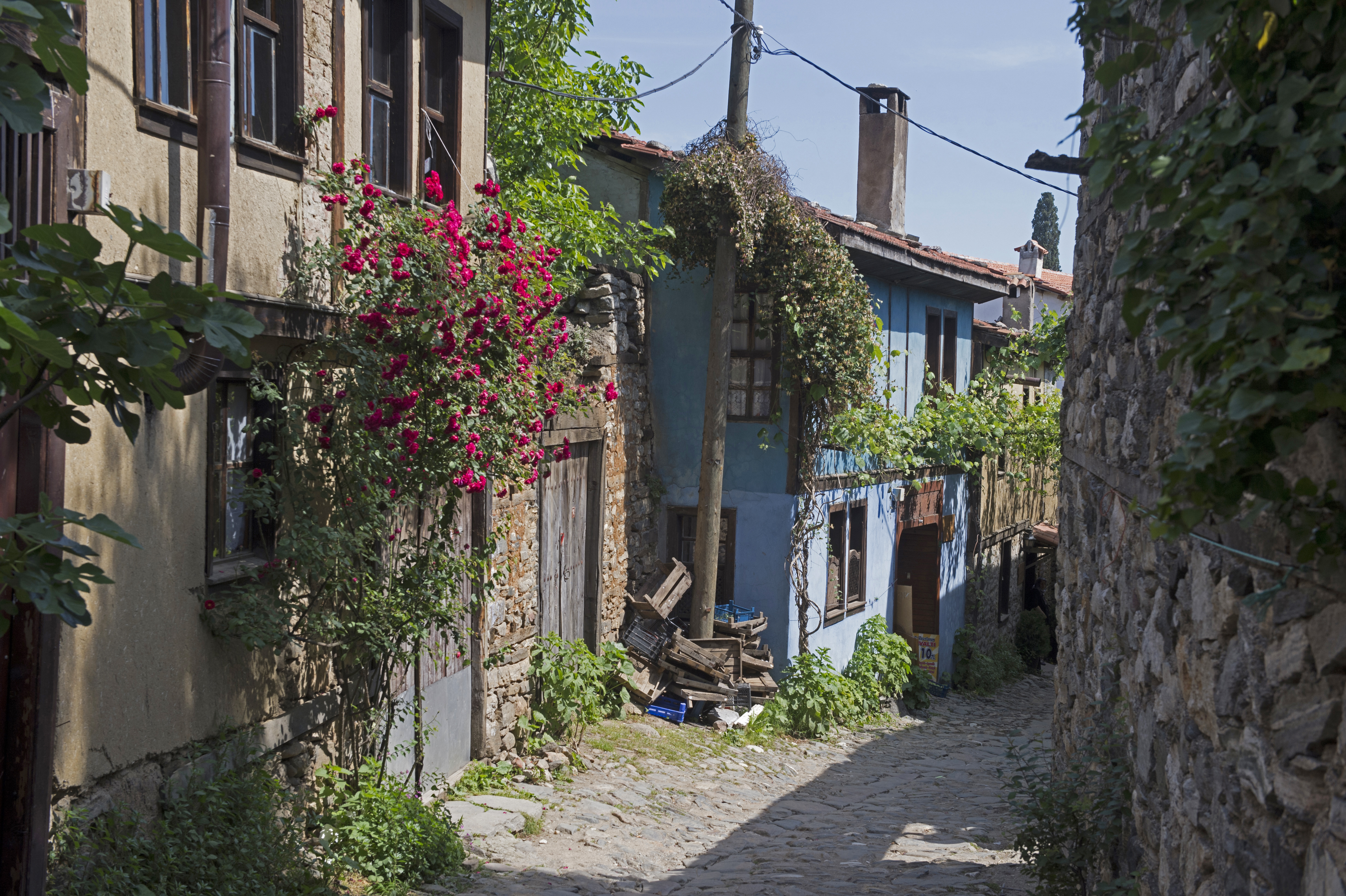

- Location within Turkey Location within Marmara
- Coordinates: 40°10′30″N 29°10′23″E
- Country: Turkey
- Province: Bursa
- District: Yıldırım
- Population (2022): 707
- Time zone: UTC+3 (TRT)
- Location within Turkey

UNESCO World Heritage Site
- Official name: Cumalikizik Village
- Part of: Bursa and Cumalıkızık: the Birth of the Ottoman Empire
- Criteria: Cultural: (i), (ii), (iv), (vi)
- Reference: 1452-008
- Inscription: 2014 (38th Session)
- Area: 8.646 ha (21.36 acres)
- Buffer zone: 191.917 ha (474.24 acres)

Cumalıkızık is a neighbourhood in the municipality and district of Yıldırım, Bursa Province in Turkey. Its population is 707 (2022). It is 10 kilometers east of the city of Bursa, at the foot of Mount Uludağ. The village is now included within the border of the Yıldırım district as a neighbourhood.

Cumalıkızık was founded as a vakıf village in honor of Ottoman Sultan Orhan Gazi. The historical texture of the village has been well protected and the civilian countryside architectural structures of the early Ottoman period are still intact. For instance, no motorized vehicles are allowed in the town. Because of these efforts, Cumalıkızık has become a popular but still unspoiled center for tourists. During the high season, the village sees as many as 50,000 visitors a week.

== Name ==
The term "cuma" means "Friday" in Turkish. The term "kızık" refers to the tribe of Oghuz settlers who founded the village. They founded seven kızık villages, of which five have survived to the present day. Historically, the village was where the kızık villagers would gather for Friday prayers.

== History ==
The history of Cumalıkızık goes back to the Ottoman Empire's foundation period in the 1300s. It was first established by Oghuz Turks as a vakıf village in honor of Ottoman Sultan Orhan Gazi.

In the 1970s, electricity was introduced to the village. Prior to that time, the streets were lit by candles or gaslight.

In the 1980s, the village started receiving tourists for the first time, with a big increase after the turn of the century.

=== Present day ===
There are 270 remaining protected buildings in the village that date back hundreds of years. Of these, 180 are still in use as homes. Due to its well-preserved architecture, the village is commonly used as a film setting in Turkish historical television and film.

In 2023, the village was designated a zero-waste zone.

== Architecture and design ==
=== Homes ===
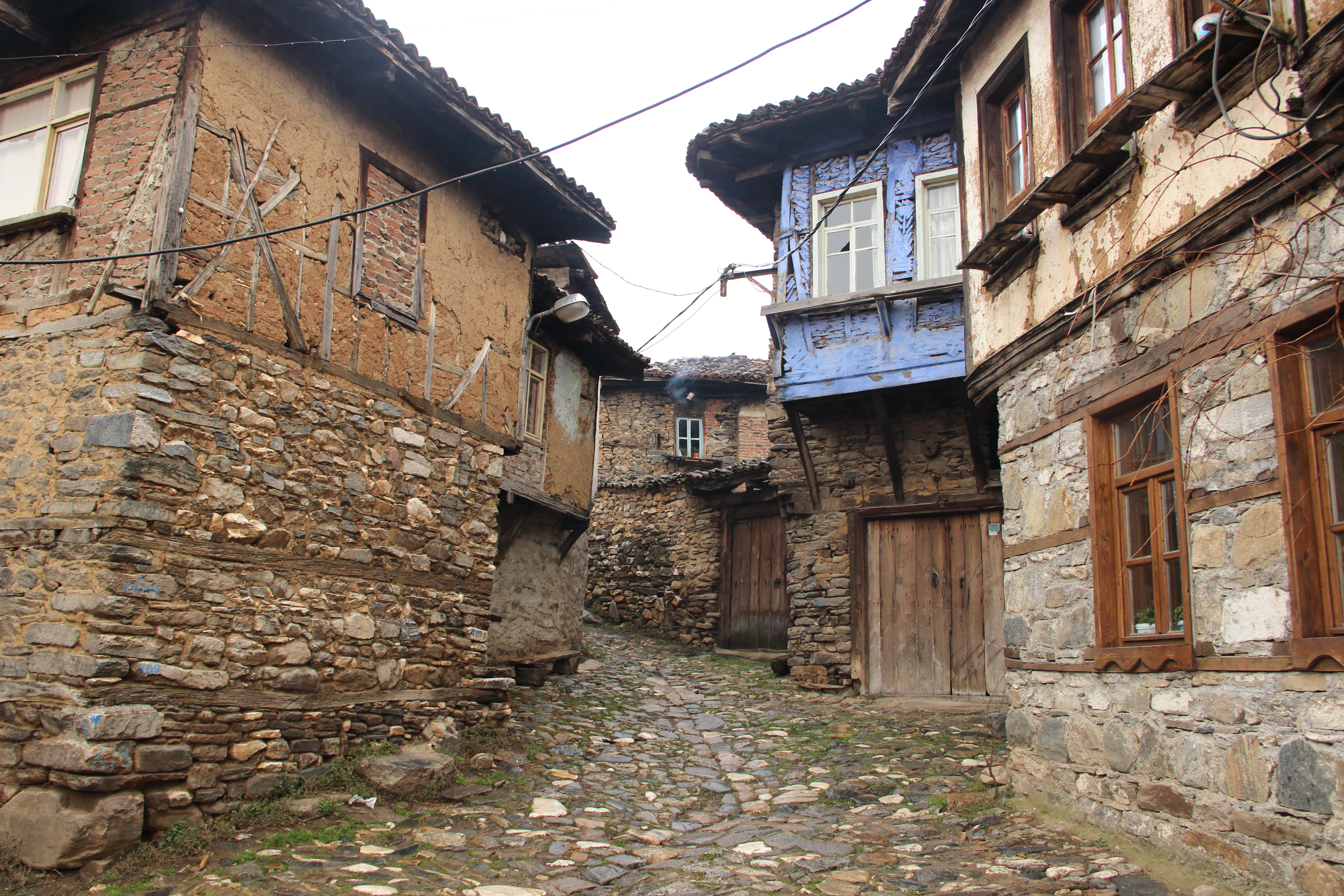
Homes in Cumalıkızık

Cumalıkızık is best known for its well-preserved Ottoman homes. These houses are typically two or three stories high, with the upper levels overhanging the streets. The frames are made of timber, and gaps were filled with bricks or left bare. Chestnut and oak are the preferred woods, as they are local to the region. The middle floors have low ceilings for the winter time, and the upper floors have high ceilings for the summer time.

The homes typically have a small courtyard, called a hayat, meaning "life" in Turkish. Here is where the toilet, stables, and storage would be kept.

In order to maintain privacy, women would observe their purdah behind screened windows overlooking the side streets. Additionally, there are no windows at all on the ground floors in order to maintain purdah.

=== Streets ===
Houses are placed compactly. In some areas, the streets narrow into only 60 cm wide; for this reason, cars are banned. Large stones line the middle of streets, and small stones are place closer to homes to create a natural drainage system for rainwater.

== Cumalıkızık mosque ==
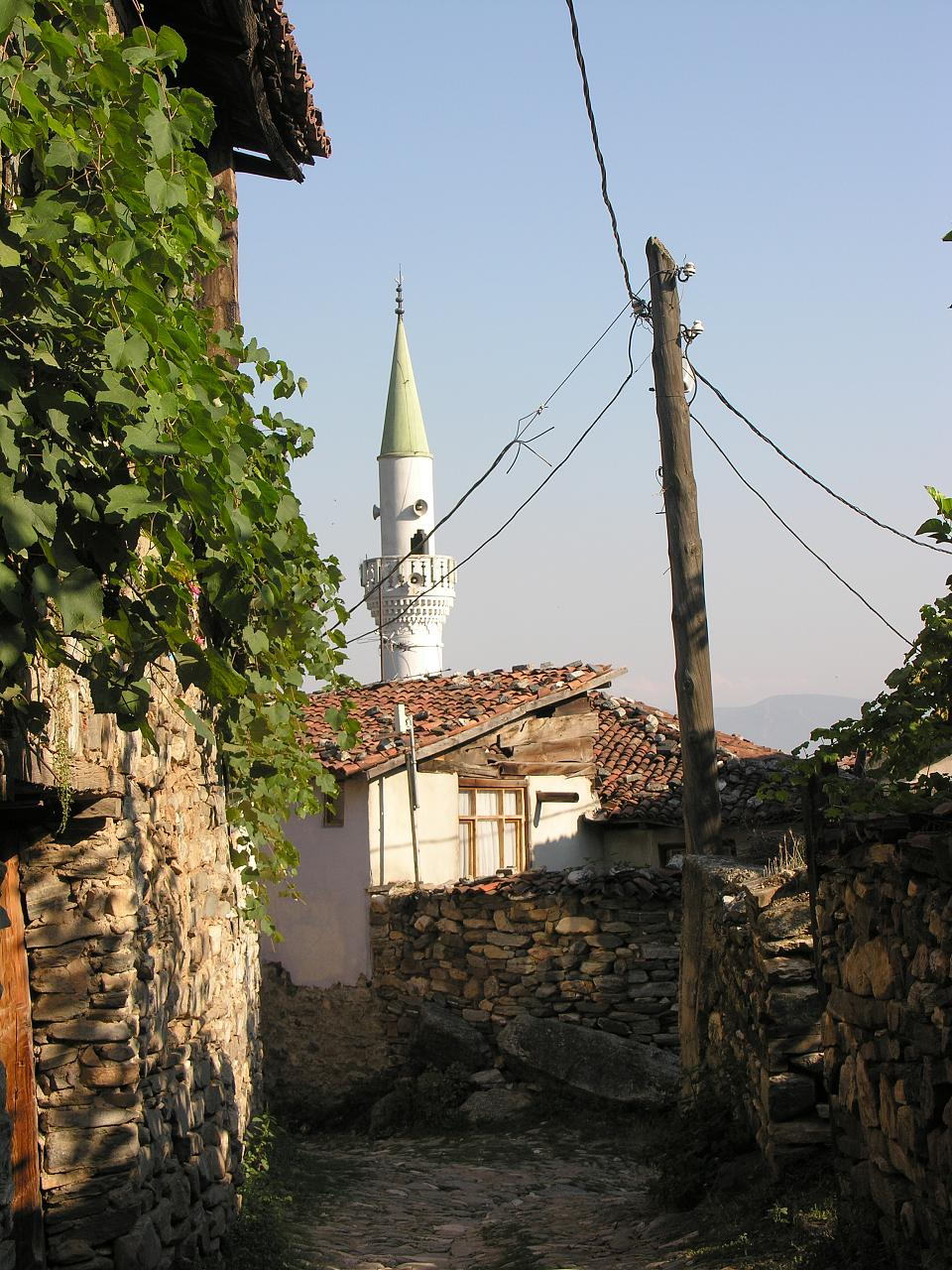
The Cumalıkızık mosque minaret

The Cumalıkızık mosque was built in 1396. It is located in the village square and has a single minaret.

Due to its age and concerns about its structural integrity, the mosque is not in use for daily religious purposes. Villagers travel to nearby locations for prayer. The mosque serves as a central, communal space for women in the village.

== Impact of tourism ==
Cumalıkızık is a victim of overtourism since its opening to the public in the 1980s. It sees up to 50,000 visitors a week during the peak season, most of whom come on Saturday or Sunday. In 2010, Cumalıkızık had 150,000 visitors, but only five years later in 2015, Cumalıkızık had 500,000 visitors. The rapid increase of tourism to the village has resulted in overstrained infrastructure and environmental issues.

=== Problems caused by overtourism ===
The narrow streets have been reported as wearing down due to excessive foot traffic. Tourists have been seen vandalizing historic buildings by writing on them, chipping off pieces, or climbing on them. Environmental pollution from leftover litter is also an issue. Tourists may enter private spaces without permission in order to take pictures.

While some locals appreciate the economic boost of tourism, the large number of tourists stresses the existing infrastructure. The water and sewage systems frequently break down, especially during peak seasons.

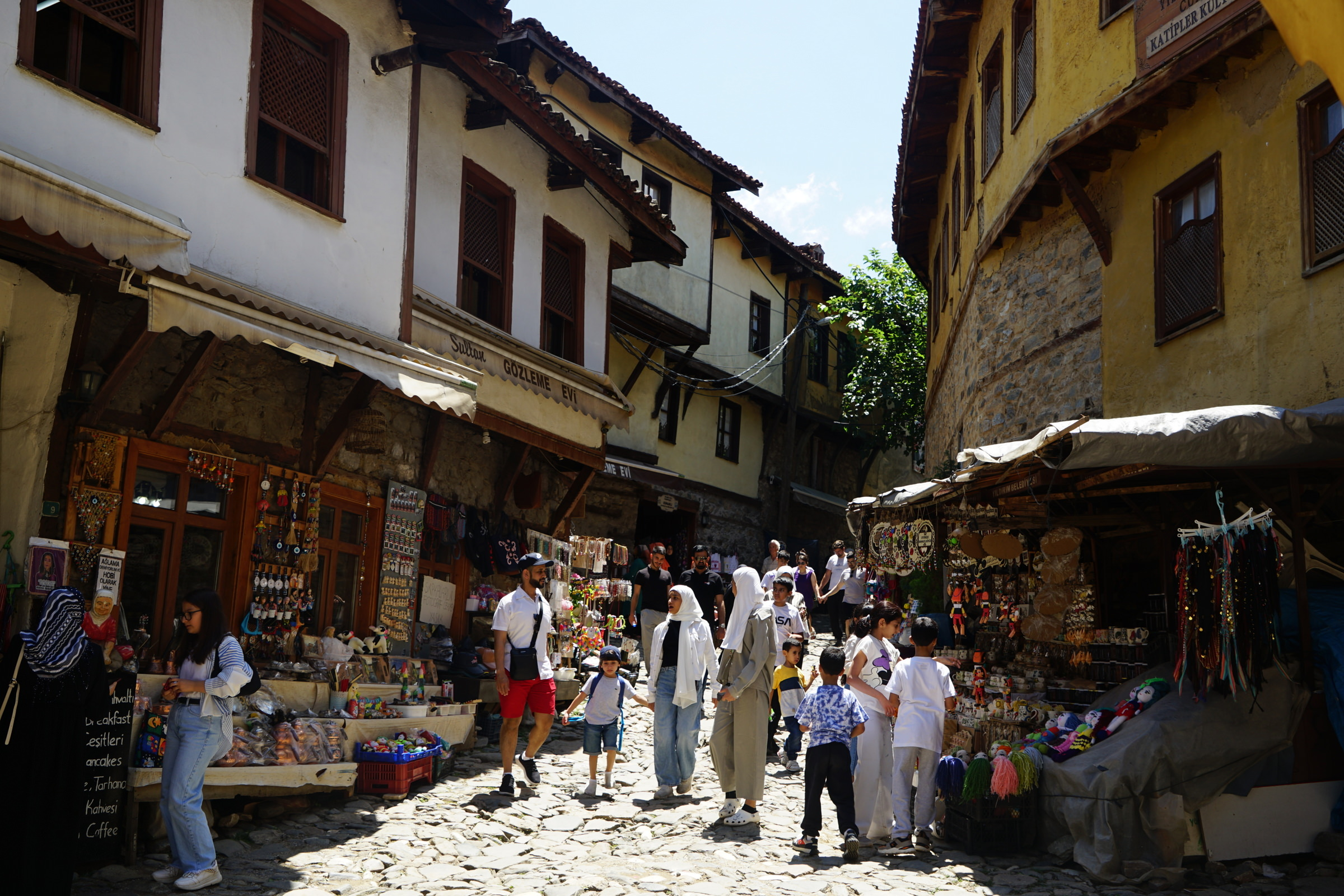
Stores selling souvenirs in Cumalıkızık

Additionally, the introduction of large tourist buses clogs up the traffic and prevents emergency services from having access to the village.

=== Change in economy ===
Previously, Cumalıkızık relied mainly on agricultural and livestock activities. However, with the boom in tourism, many locals are switching to commercial activities like selling souvenirs and running cafes. Outside investors have also opened stores and bought portions of the land, decreasing the economic control of the villagers.

== Gallery ==
Video showing the architecture and culture of Cumalıkızık.

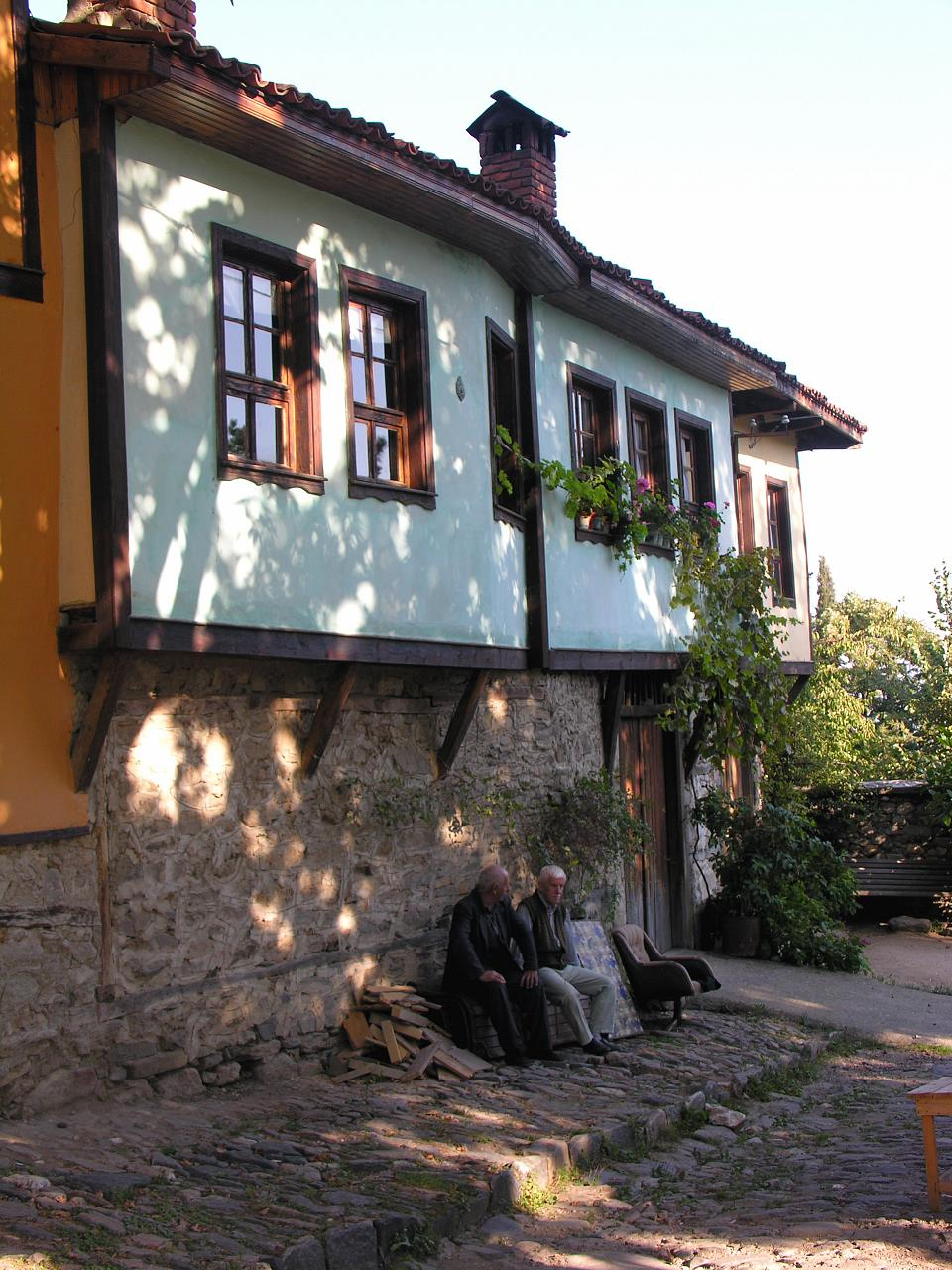
An example of the Ottoman architecture

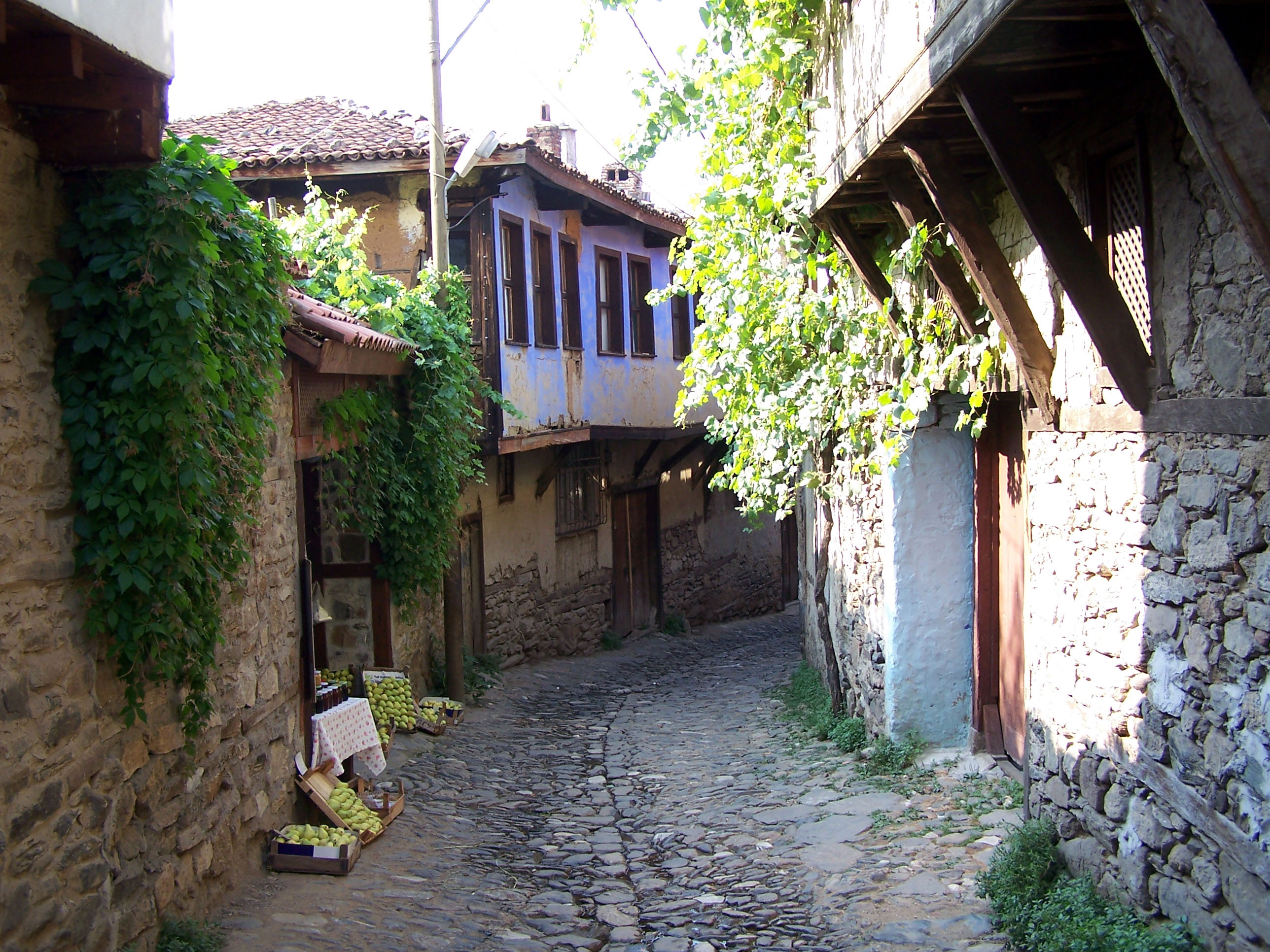

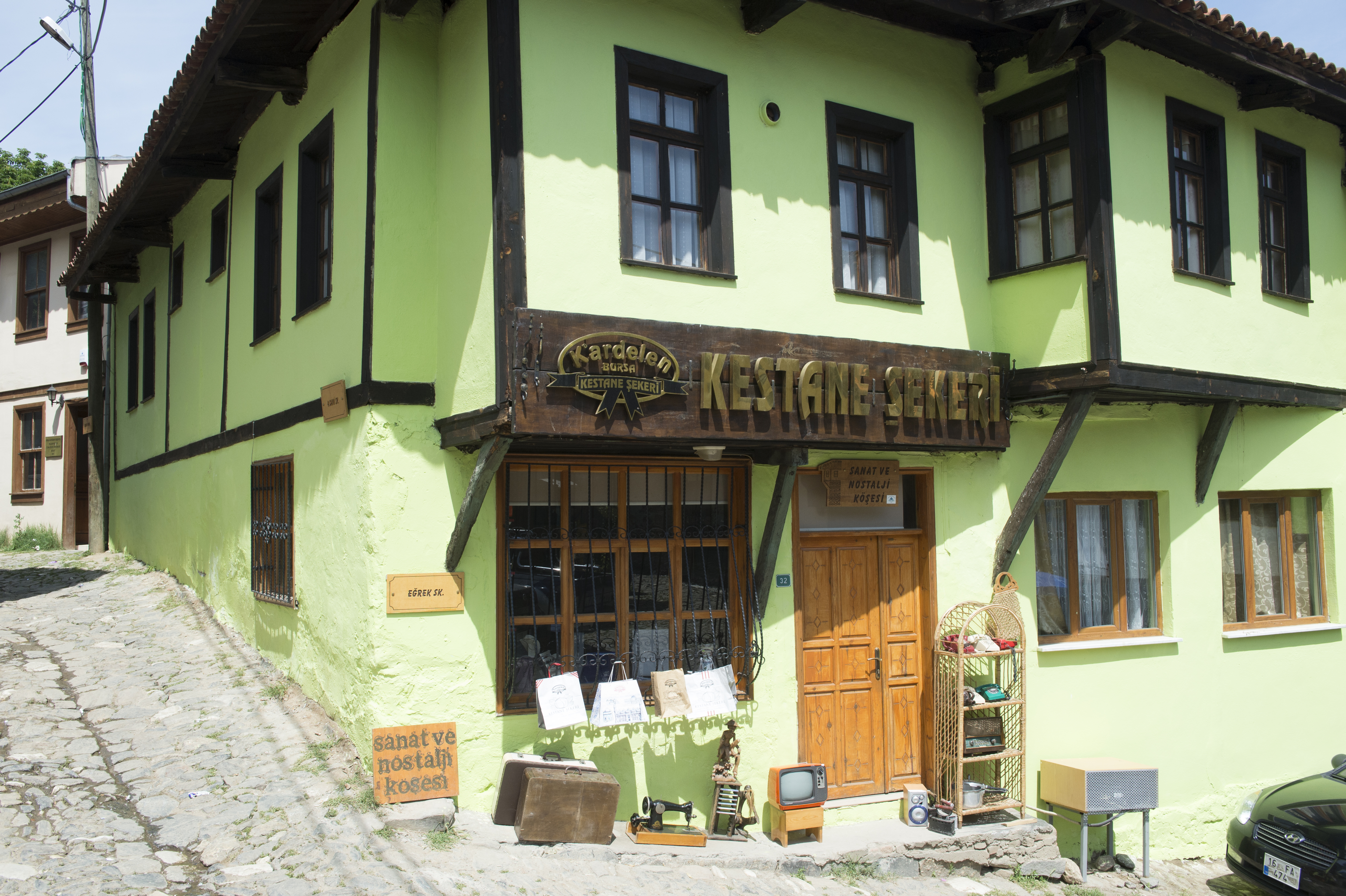
Cumalıkızık in spring 2014

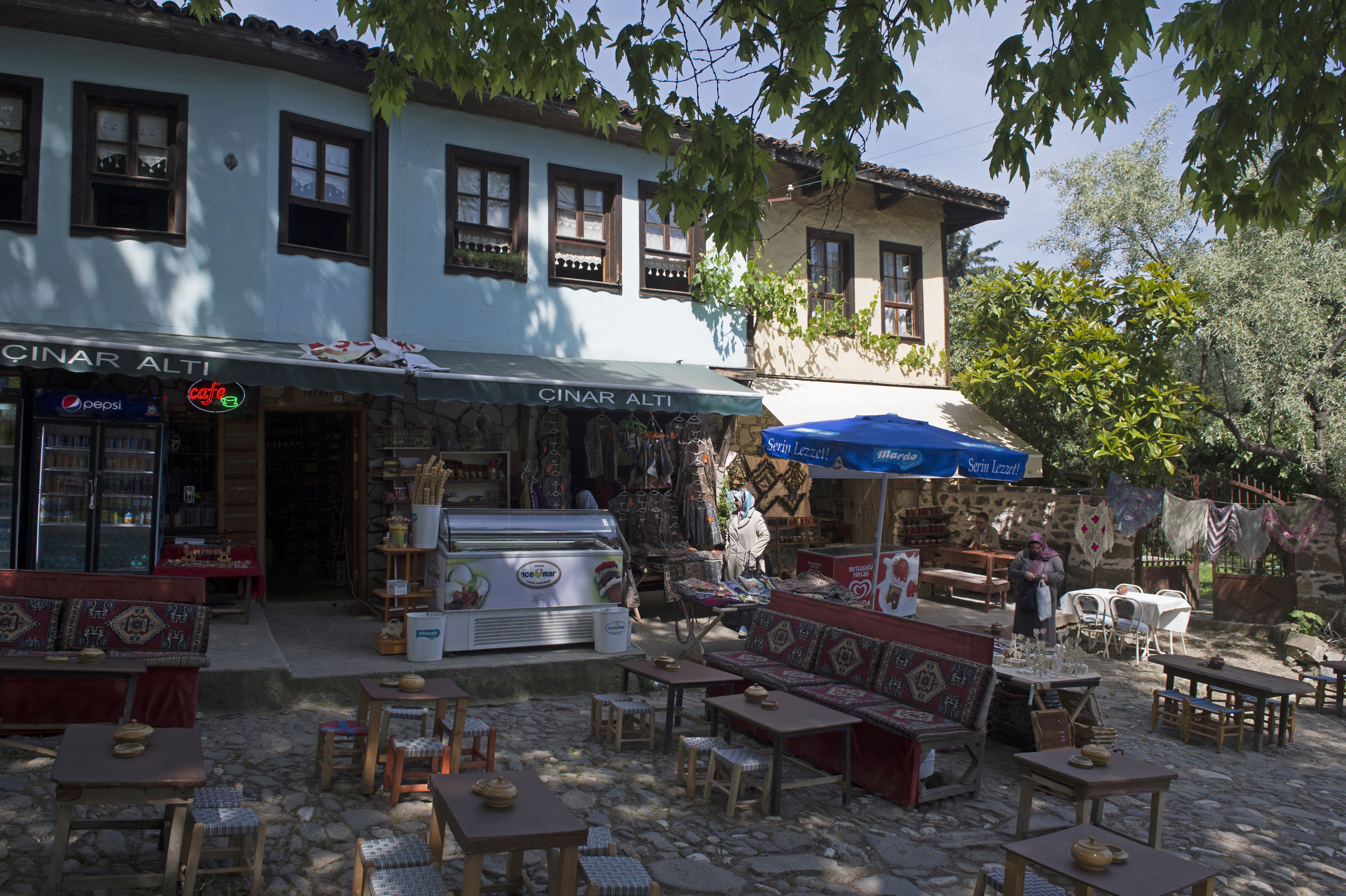
A restaurant in Cumalıkızık

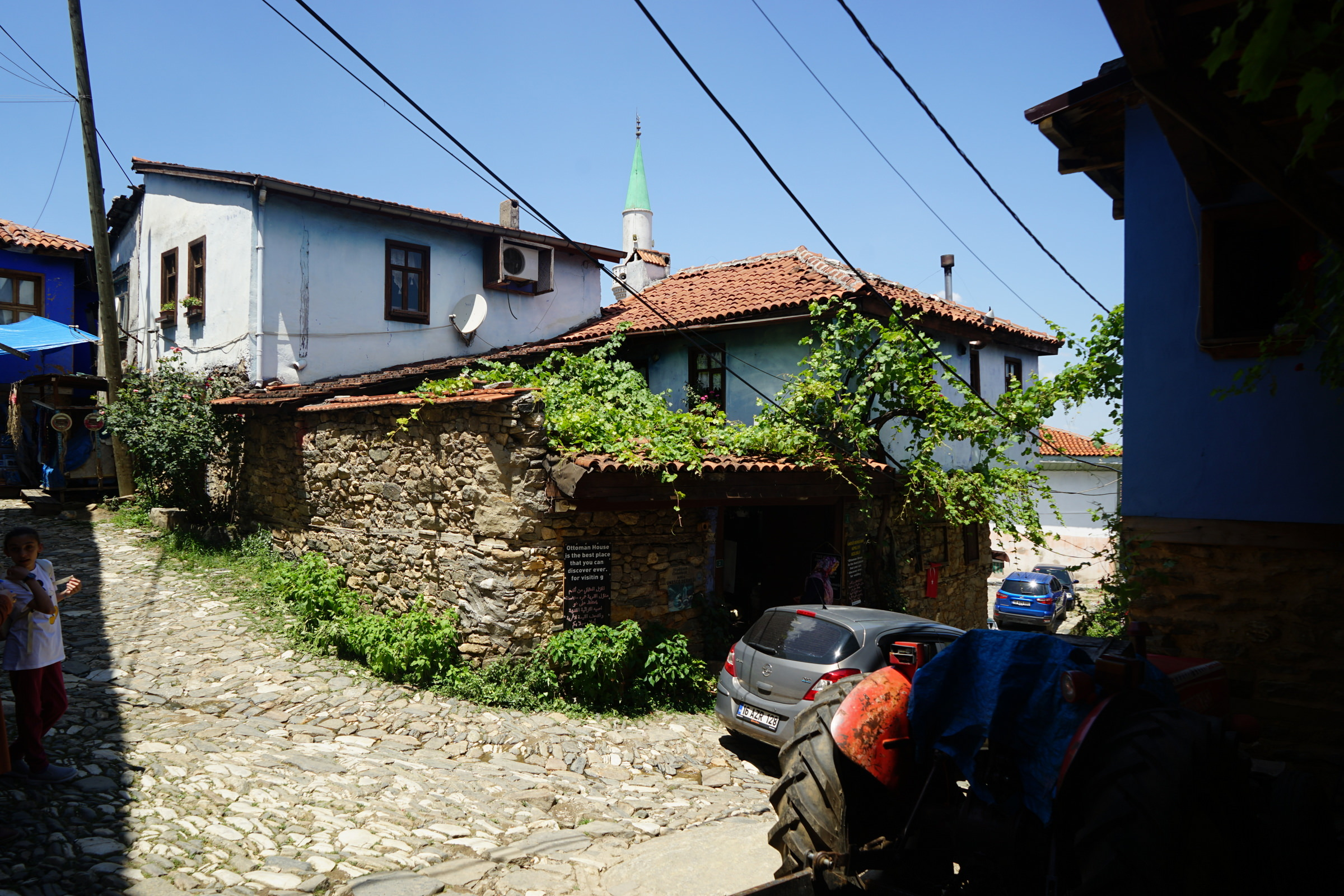
Mosque in Cumalıkızık

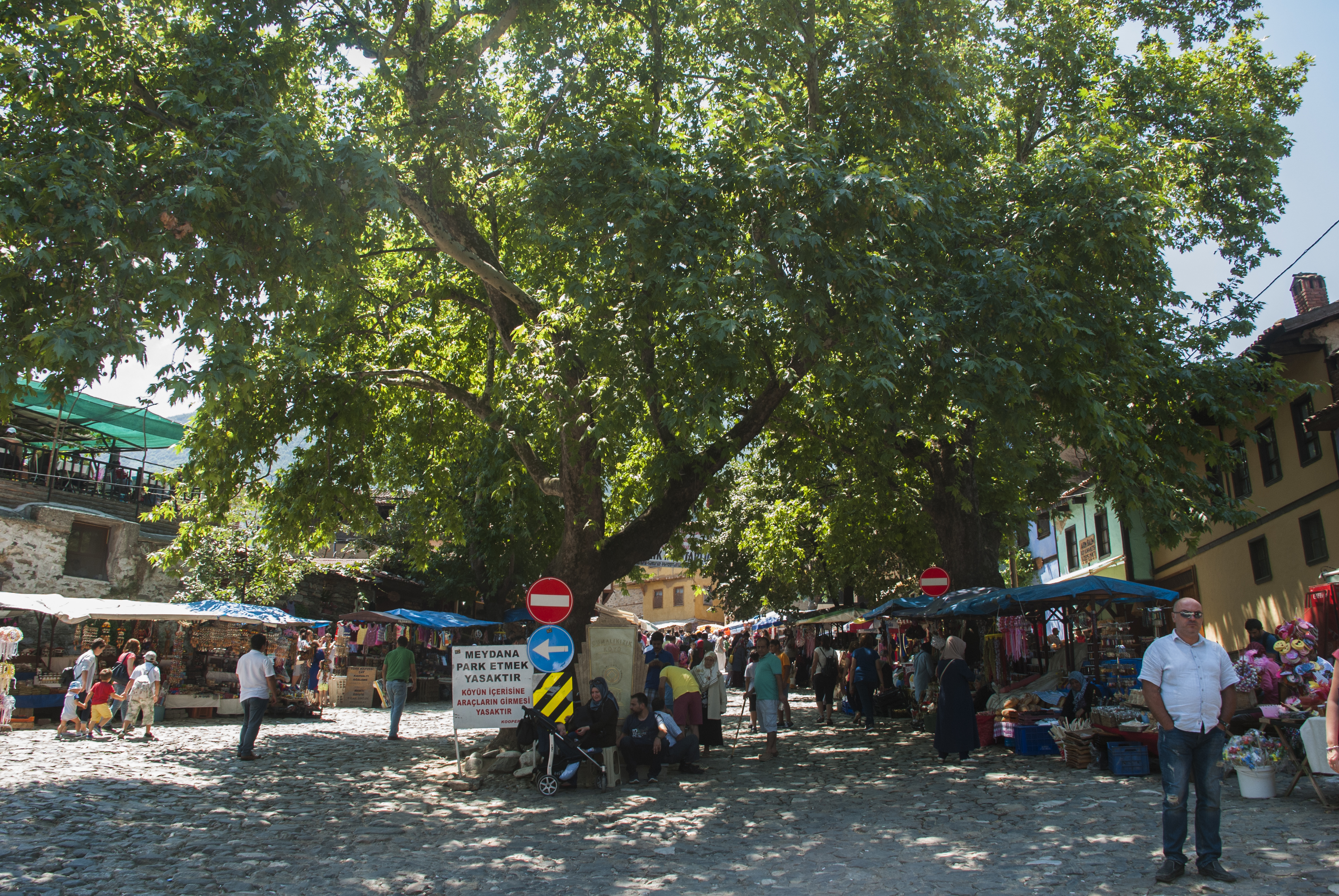
Cumalıkızık center

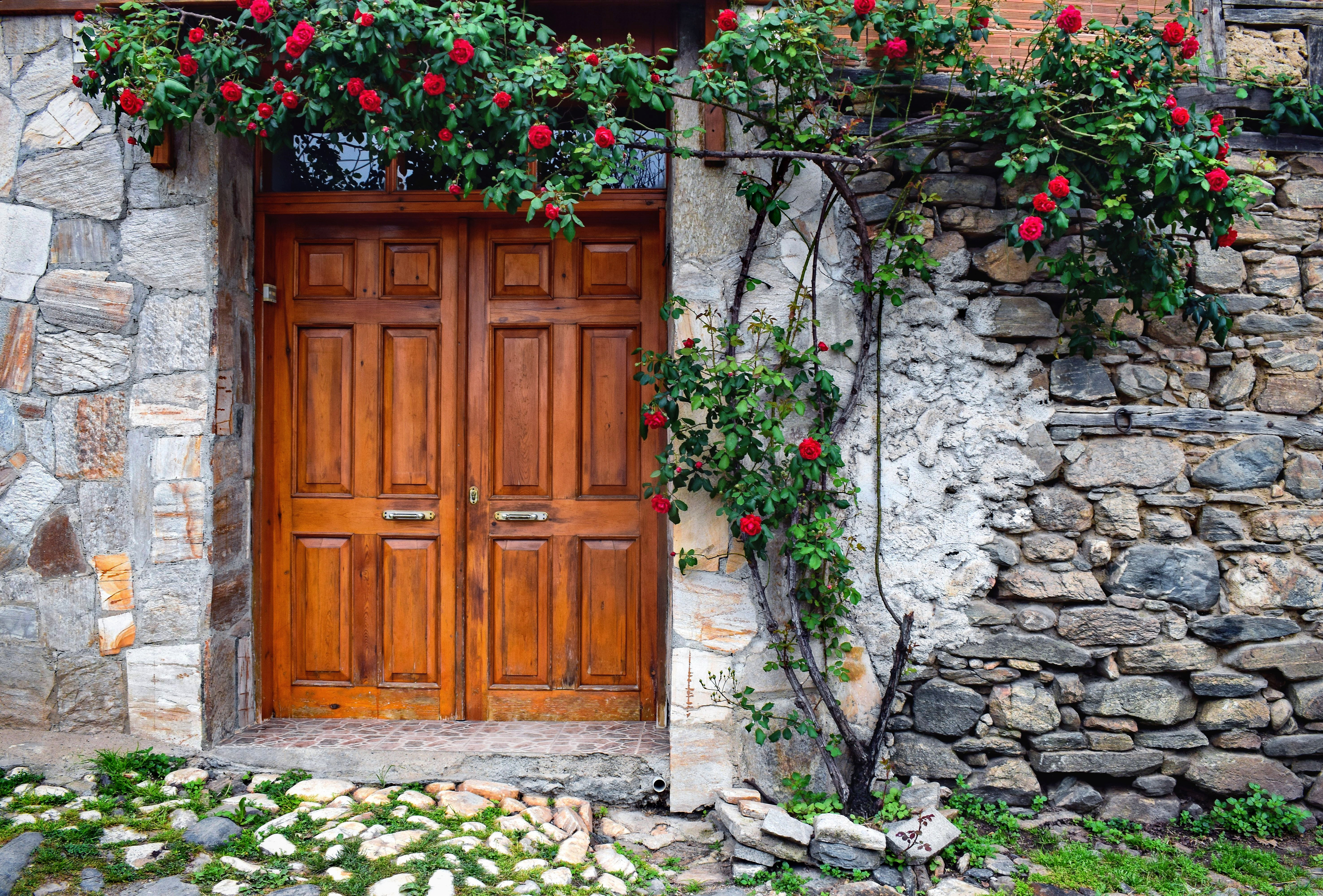
A stone house in Cumalıkızık

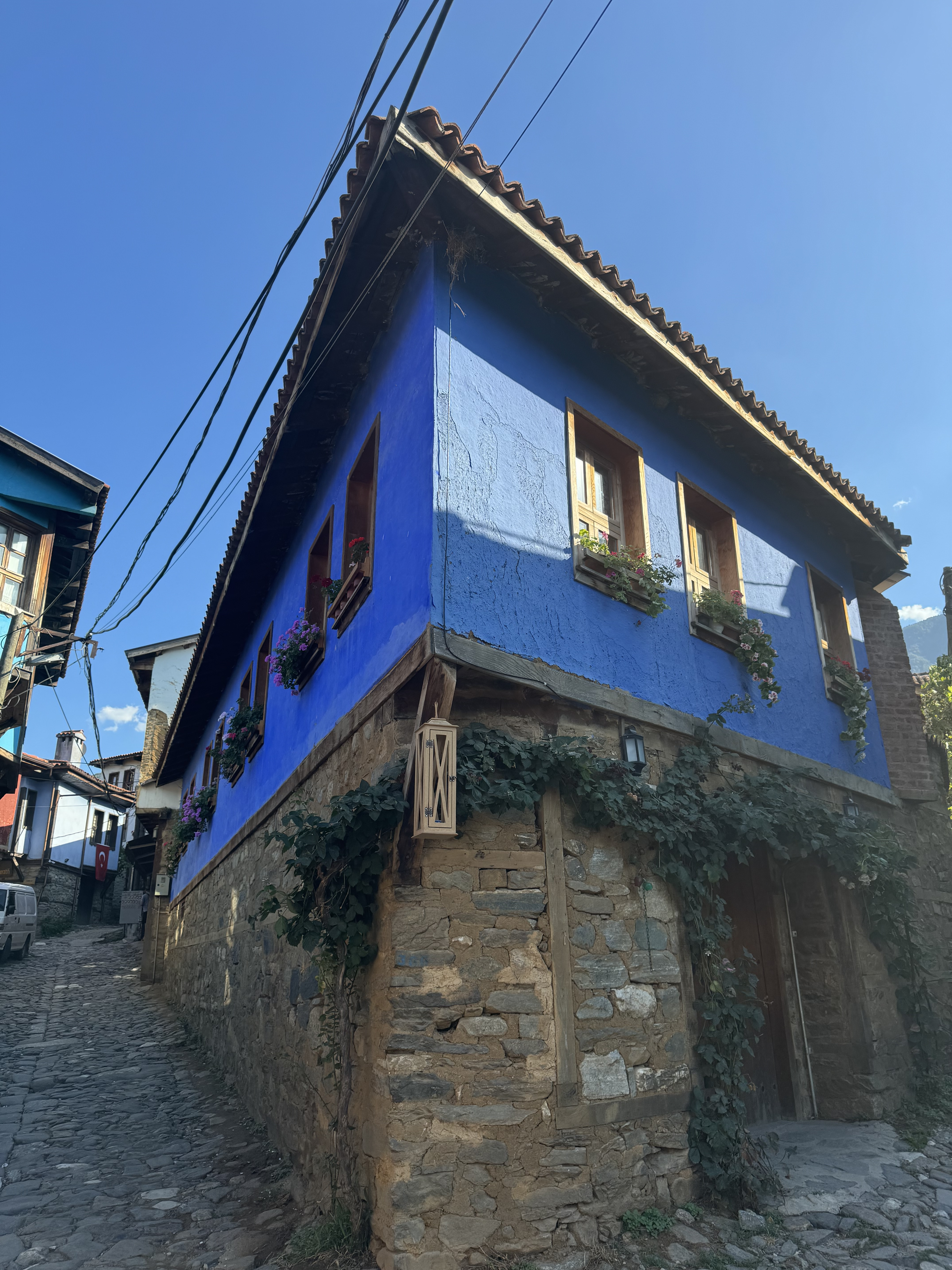
A side view of a house in Cumalıkızık

== See also ==
- Kızık (disambiguation)
- List of World Heritage Sites in Turkey
