= The Oodie =

Australian loungewear brand

Davie Clothing Pty Ltd
- Type: Private
- Industry: Loungewear; Apparel; E-commerce
- Founded: 2018
- Founder: Davie Fogarty
- Headquarters: Australia
- Key people: Davie Fogarty
- Products: Wearable blankets; Hooded blankets; Sleepwear; Towels; Shoes; Socks
- Website: theoodie.com

Davie Clothing Pty Ltd, trading as The Oodie, is an Australian e-commerce loungewear brand best known for its oversized, wearable blanket products. Founded in 2018 by entrepreneur Davie Fogarty, the brand gained widespread popularity during the COVID-19 pandemic and has since reported more than A$600 million in cumulative sales. The Oodie is part of Fogarty's broader portfolio of consumer brands, alongside his role as an investor on Shark Tank Australia.

== History ==
In 2020, during COVID-19 lockdowns, The Oodie gained international popularity as a comfort-wear item, with search interest reportedly increasing more than 200% in the UK and globally; the product was created by Australian brothers David and Todd Fogarty as a wearable blanket made from flannel and sherpa fleece.

== Founder ==
In August 2023, Oodie founder Davie Fogarty was announced as a judge ('Shark') on Network Ten's Shark Tank Australia, following the rapid growth of The Oodie into an e-commerce business reported to have generated A$500 million in sales within five years and valued at approximately A$250 million.

In October 2023, Fogarty invested A$250,000 in Fydoo, a start-up producing an automated pet toilet system, backing the business publicly and supporting its growth strategy as part of his broader portfolio of consumer and e-commerce ventures.

In September 2023, Fogarty published commentary on e-commerce risk and strategy, stating that The Oodie had sold more than 8.1 million units and generated over A$500 million in revenue, while outlining operational challenges such as counterfeit products, platform dependence, scaling fulfilment, and online reputation management.

In October 2024, Forbes Australia profiled Fogarty following his inclusion in its inaugural 30 Under 30 list, reporting that The Oodie had generated more than A$600 million in cumulative sales since its launch in 2018 and highlighting his broader activities as an investor, Shark Tank Australia judge, and founder of the e-commerce coaching business Daily Mentor.

== Growth and expansion ==
During the COVID-19 pandemic, The Oodie experienced rapid commercial growth, reporting monthly sales of approximately 205,000 units in 2021 and several individual days exceeding A$1 million in revenue, with sales accelerating significantly from early lockdowns in March 2020.

== Products ==
Following its pandemic-era growth, The Oodie expanded its product range beyond hooded blankets to include tracksuit pants and a collaboration with UGG Boots Australia, introducing branded UGG boots in 2021.

== Customer services and operations ==
In December 2024, The Oodie faced customer complaints in New Zealand over delayed deliveries following Black Friday sales, with the company citing unforeseen stock transfer issues affecting fulfilment and communication during the Christmas period.

== Competition ==
In 2022, Forbes identified The Oodie as one of several competitors in the wearable-blanket market, alongside brands such as The Comfy, amid increased competition and the emergence of lower-priced alternatives.

== Regulatory issues ==
In July 2024, the Australian Competition & Consumer Commission fined Davie Clothing, the supplier of The Oodie, A$101,280 for supplying children's 'Kids Beach Oodie' garments without mandatory high fire danger warning labels, affecting more than 2,400 items sold between September 2022 and July 2023; the products were recalled in August 2023, and the company committed to publishing a corrective notice and implementing an Australian Consumer Law compliance program.

In 2024, Davie Clothing Pty Ltd was warned by New Zealand's Commerce Commission for breaching the Fair Trading Act after supplying wearable towels that did not comply with mandatory product safety standards for children's nightwear and limited daywear.

== Environmental impact ==
In 2021, academics writing in The Conversation highlighted environmental and health concerns associated with polyester fleece garments, noting that products such as The Oodie may contribute to microplastic pollution through fibre shedding during washing, as well as increased carbon emissions associated with synthetic fabric production.
