= Outback Wrangler =

- Genre: Factual television
- Presented by: Matt Wright
- Country of origin: Australia
- Original language: English
- No. of seasons: 4
- No. of episodes: 28

Production
- Producer: National Geographic

Original release
- Network: National Geographic; 9Go! Nine Network
- Release: 2011 – 2020

Outback Wrangler was an Australian factual television series that follows the work of helicopter pilot and animal catcher Matt Wright and his adventurous life in various parts of the Australian outback. Outback Wrangler has been seen in over 90 countries.

== Broadcast ==
The first season of four episodes was first broadcast in 2011 on National Geographic, then repeated on 9Go! in 2016 and on the Nine Network in 2017. The second season was launched in November 2015 and screened into 2016. A third season began screening at the end of 2017 and into 2018. A fourth season of the show, retitled Monster Croc Wrangler, screened on Nine from late 2019.

== Helicopter crash ==
In February 2022 co-star Chris “Willow” Wilson was killed in a helicopter crash on a job collecting crocodile eggs in West Arnhem Land. The pilot Sebastian Robinson survived but sustained punctured lungs and a traumatic brain injury, resulting in permanent paraplegia. Following a six month investigation, in November 2022 an arrest warrant was issued for Outback Wrangler star Matt Wright for a number of charges relating to the incident. Wright later arrived in Darwin and faced court. Matt Wright was found guilty on two counts of attempting to pervert the course of justice, by lying to police and pressuring a hospitalised witness in which he was sentenced in December 2025 to ten months imprisonment with credit to a time served of five months.
