= Flashpoint (Australian TV program) =

- Genre: Current affairs
- Presented by: Tim McMillan; Peter Rowsthorn; Ben Harvey
- Country of origin: Australia
- Original language: English
- No. of seasons: 4

Production
- Executive producer: Sandra Di Girolamo
- Production locations: Perth, Western Australia
- Running time: 30 minutes

Original release
- Network: Seven Network
- Release: 2 September 2019 – 2023

Flashpoint was an Australian current affairs television program that tackled issues concerning Western Australians. It aired on the Seven Network in Perth, and was presented by Tim McMillan, with Peter Rowsthorn and Ben Harvey appearing as recurring co-presenters. The show debuted in September 2019 in a Monday night timeslot, but moved to Sunday mornings in 2022. It was axed in February 2024.
