= Davie Fogarty =

Australian entrepreneur

- Occupation: Entrepreneur
- Television: Shark Tank Australia

Davie Fogarty is an Australian entrepreneur and television investor, best known as the founder of the direct-to-consumer apparel brand The Oodie. He is the founder of The Davie Group, which oversees multiple consumer brands across home, lifestyle, and pet care, and has been listed on the Australian Financial Review Young Rich List.

Fogarty rose to prominence after the rapid growth of The Oodie during the COVID-19 pandemic and later became a public figure through his role as an investor on Shark Tank Australia, joining the program in 2023 and returning for the 2024 season.

== Early life and education ==
Fogarty completed secondary school in South Australia and later enrolled in a mining engineering degree, which he left before completing.

=== The Oodie ===
Fogarty founded The Oodie in 2018 as a direct-to-consumer loungewear brand. Under Fogarty's leadership, The Oodie expanded into licensed collaborations with major entertainment and consumer brands including Disney, Warner Bros, Marvel, Pokémon, AFL and Barbie. Media reports stated that brand licensing partnerships generated more than A$100 million in sales.

After several years of rapid growth, Fogarty hired a chief executive officer at The Oodie and stepped back from day-to-day management, while continuing to contribute to creative and strategic decision-making.

=== Pupnaps ===
In 2019, Fogarty co-founded the pet-care brand Pupnaps with Jye de Zylva. The company produces calming dog beds designed to reduce anxiety in pets and reported rapid growth within its first year of operation, reaching more than A$1 million in monthly revenue.

=== Fydoo ===
In addition to Pupnaps, Fogarty has been involved in the development of Fydoo, an automated indoor pet toilet system designed for apartment and indoor pet owners. The product was developed in collaboration with entrepreneur Sebastian Waddell and entered pre-sales in Australia in the early 2020s.

== Career ==
Prior to founding his consumer brands, he worked in warehouse roles and personal training, and later generated income through social media marketing and e-commerce ventures.

=== Shark Tank Australia ===
In March 2023, Fogarty was announced as one of the investors joining the relaunch of Shark Tank Australia, following the program's hiatus after its 2018 season. Media coverage described him as an e-commerce specialist, joining the judging panel alongside entrepreneurs from retail, marketing, technology, and artificial intelligence backgrounds.

In media interviews, he described the program's investor dynamics as competitive but professional, stating that while disagreements over deals occurred, the cast maintained respectful working relationships and approached negotiations as business decisions rather than personal conflicts. Fogarty also said he looks for entrepreneurs with what he described as a “relentless desire to make it work” when assessing potential investments.

During the 2023 season of Shark Tank Australia, Fogarty invested A$50,000 in Australian skincare brand Boring Without You, securing a 20 per cent equity stake after competing offers from multiple investors.

In 2023, he also invested $250,000 in Suitor, a Sydney-based men's suit hire company founded in 2017. Following the investment, he took on an active advisory role, working with the founders on operational strategy, product development, and brand positioning.

In 2024, Fogarty returned as an investor on Shark Tank Australia, appearing alongside Jane Lu, Robert Herjavec, Maxine Horne and Nick Bell for the series’ revived season on Network 10.

== Public profile ==
Fogarty has been listed on the Australian Financial Review Young Rich List and has also shared e-commerce insights publicly through media commentary and a mentoring platform aimed at online entrepreneurs. He has publicly spoken about a business philosophy of “buying back time,” advocating the delegation of routine tasks to allow greater focus on business and strategic work.

In 2023, Fogarty attracted media attention after posting a social media video showcasing a newly purchased property in the Adelaide Hills, which prompted public debate about wealth display during the cost-of-living crisis.

In addition to his consumer brands, Fogarty has been associated with educational initiatives for online retailers, including a planned free Shopify course that underwent beta testing.

== Awards and recognition ==
In 2022, Fogarty was named a Central Region finalist in the EY Entrepreneur of the Year Australia Awards, recognising his work as founder of The Davie Group.

In 2022, he was also awarded the South Australia 40 Under 40 Entrepreneurial Award, presented by William Buck, recognising his role in building The Davie Group and scaling consumer brands including The Oodie during the COVID-19 pandemic.

Fogarty was named to Forbes Australia's inaugural 30 Under 30 list in 2024. Media coverage has also noted his involvement in Daily Mentor, a coaching business focused on e-commerce operators, which has been reported to work with hundreds of brands and to have expanded alongside his retail ventures.
