= Yıldırım, Bursa =

Yıldırım
- District and municipality
- Map showing Yıldırım District in Bursa Province

- Location in Turkey Yıldırım (Marmara)
- Coordinates: 40°06′36″N 29°04′56″E
- Country: Turkey
- Province: Bursa

Government
  - Mayor: Oktay Yılmaz (AKP)
- Area: 110 km^{2} (40 sq mi)
- Population (2022): 655,856
  - Density: 6,000/km^{2} (15,000/sq mi)
- Time zone: UTC+3 (TRT)
- Area code: 0224
- Website: www.yildirim.bel.tr

Districts of Bursa City

Yıldırım is a municipality and district of Bursa Province, Turkey. Its area is 110 km^{2}, and its population is 655,856 (2022). It covers part of the city centre of Bursa. Founded in 1987, it was named after Ottoman Sultan Bayezid I, whose nickname was Yıldırım ("thunderbolt" in Turkish).

The scenery of Bursa from Uludağ with the old aerial tramway

It is at the foot of Mt. Uludağ, at 150–155 metres in elevation. Kestel and Gürsu are to its west, and the flat lands of Demirtaş, a subdistrict of Osmangazi, are to its north. The Bursa-Ankara highway passes through it. With Osmangazi and Nilüfer, Yıldırım covers the Bursa agglomeration.

The Bursa Uludağ Aerial Lift (Turkish: Teleferik, pictured to the right) is an aerial lift serving Mt. Uludağ. Built by the Swiss company Von Roll Holding and opened on 29 October 1963, the aerial tramway was replaced in 2013 by a modern and much bigger capacity gondola lift system by Leitner Group of Italy.

Yıldırım is one of Turkey's important textile production centers. With a population of 629,702 at the 2000 census, it is also one of Turkey's most populated areas; 30% of Bursa's population lives in the Yıldırım district.

== Historical places ==
- Yeşil Mosque (Green Mosque)
- Yeşil Türbe (Green Tomb)
- Bayezid I Mosque and (külliye) complex (Yıldırım Camii ve külliyesi)
- Emir Sultan Mosque
- Cumalıkızık village, with well-preserved historical Ottoman architecture

== Composition ==
There are 71 neighbourhoods in Yıldırım District:

- 152 Evler
- Akçağlayan
- Anadolu
- Arabayatağı
- Bağlaraltı
- Balaban
- Baruthane
- Beyazıt
- Çelebi Mehmet
- Çınarönü
- Cumalıkızık
- Davutdede
- Davutkadı
- Değirmenlikızık
- Değirmenönü
- Demetevler
- Duaçınarı
- Eğitim
- Emirsultan
- Erikli
- Ertuğrulgazi
- Esenevler
- Fidyekızık
- Güllük
- Hacıseyfettin
- Hacıvat
- Hamamlıkızık
- Hocataşkın
- İsabey
- Kaplıkaya
- Karaağaç
- Karamazak
- Karapınar
- Kazımkarabekir
- Kurtoğlu
- Maltepe
- Mehmet Akif Ersoy
- Mevlana
- Meydancık
- Millet
- Mimarsinan
- Mollaarap
- Musababa
- Namazgah
- Ortabağlar
- Piremir
- Sakarya
- Samanlı
- Selçukbey
- Selimzade
- Sinandede
- Sıracevizler
- Şirinevler
- Siteler
- Şükraniye
- Teferrüç
- Ulus
- Umurbey
- Vakıf
- Vatan
- Yavuzselim
- Yediselviler
- Yenimahalle
- Yeşil
- Yeşilyayla
- Yetmişbeşinciyıl
- Yiğitler
- Yıldırım
- Yunusemre
- Zeyniler
- Zümrütevler
