= Alan Wilkie (weather presenter) =

Australian meteorologist, radio and television weather presenter (1928–2023)

- Born: Alan Douglas Wilkie; 23 July 1928; Maryborough, Queensland, Australia
- Died: 10 July 2023 (aged 94); Sydney, New South Wales, Australia
- Education: University of Queensland (BSc); Melbourne University
- Occupations: Meteorologist, radio and television weather presenter
- Years active: 1950–2001
- Known for: Being a television and radio weather presenter Being the first television broadcast Weatherman in Australia
- Television: ABC News NSW; Seven News Sydney; Sydney Today; Today; Nine News Sydney
- Family: Ray Wilkie (brother)

Alan Douglas Wilkie (23 July 1928 – 10 July 2023) was an Australian meteorologist and radio and television weather presenter.

Wilkie was the first weatherman on broadcast television in Australia. He began in the first week the ABC opened in Sydney, later moving to commercial television at the Seven Network. Finally, he would become best known for his lengthy 25 year career as a Sydney-based television weather forecaster at the Nine Network during the tenure of news presenter Brian Henderson.

Wilkie, along with his brother Ray Wilkie and others such as Mike Bailey presented the weather at a time, when many TV weatherman where professional and trained meteorologists, rather than simply presenters, complete with weather maps, black or white board markers in hand, magnets and pointers.

== Early life ==
Wilkie was born on 23 July 1928 to William Wilkie and Daisy Isobel Lewis. He grew up in Childers, Queensland, where his father worked at the nearby Isis Central sugar mill.

From 1943, he attended Maryborough Boys State High School.

After initially embarking on a career as a school teacher, Wilkie graduated from the University of Queensland with a Bachelor of Science.

Wilkie then attended Melbourne University where he did a post-graduate meteorology course.

== Career ==
In 1950, Wilkie commenced working for the Bureau of Meteorology. During his time at the bureau he was posted to Sydney, Melbourne and Woomera.

At the insistence of the bureau, Wilkie auditioned for a role as a television weather presenter, upon the launch of the ABC TV's new Sydney television station ABN-2 in 1956.

Wilkie spent three years at the ABC before leaving the role to become a quality controller for Rheem.

Wilkie returned to television in 1968 after his wife told him of a newspaper advertisement placed by the Seven Network's Sydney station ATN-7 which was seeking a new weather presenter for its nightly news bulletin.

In addition to being the weather presenter on the station's flagship evening news bulletin, Wilkie was also asked to deliver the weather on its new breakfast show Sydney Today. Hosted by Bruce Webster and Patricia Lovell, with newsreader Geoff Stone, Sydney Today was launched in 1969 and subsequently became a national program in 1971 simply titled Today.

Wilkie also delivered weather reports for radio stations including 2SM.

In 1977, he was poached by the Nine Network's Sydney station TCN-9 to deliver the nightly forecasts on National Nine News. Seven's attempts to convince Wilkie to stay with their network failed.

Wilkie remained at Nine until his retirement in 2001.

Upon Wilkie's retirement, the Nine Network indicated that they didn't intend to replace Wilkie with another weather presenter, instead preferring to have long time news anchor Brian Henderson read the weather from the news desk at the end of the bulletin.

== Personal life and death ==
When Wilkie was aged 16, his mother Daisy Wilkie died in Maryborough at the age of 45 on 24 June 1945.

His older brother Ray Wilkie OAM was also a meteorologist and television weather presenter, best known for his work at Network 10's television station in Brisbane. Ray Wilkie died on 18 May 2023.

Wilkie's engagement to Virginia Anderson was announced in August 1960. They married at St Philip's Church in Sydney on 30 November 1960. After their marriage, they purchased a house at Killara in 1961 where they lived until listing the property for sale in 1992.

They eventually divorced and Virginia Wilkie died at the age of 75 on 5 May 2015.

Wilkie died on 10 July 2023, a couple of weeks shy of his 95th birthday, and just under two months after his brother's death at 98.

Preceded by Position created	National Nine News Sydney; Weather presenter 1977–2001	Succeeded by Georgie Gardner
