= Huez =

- Commune
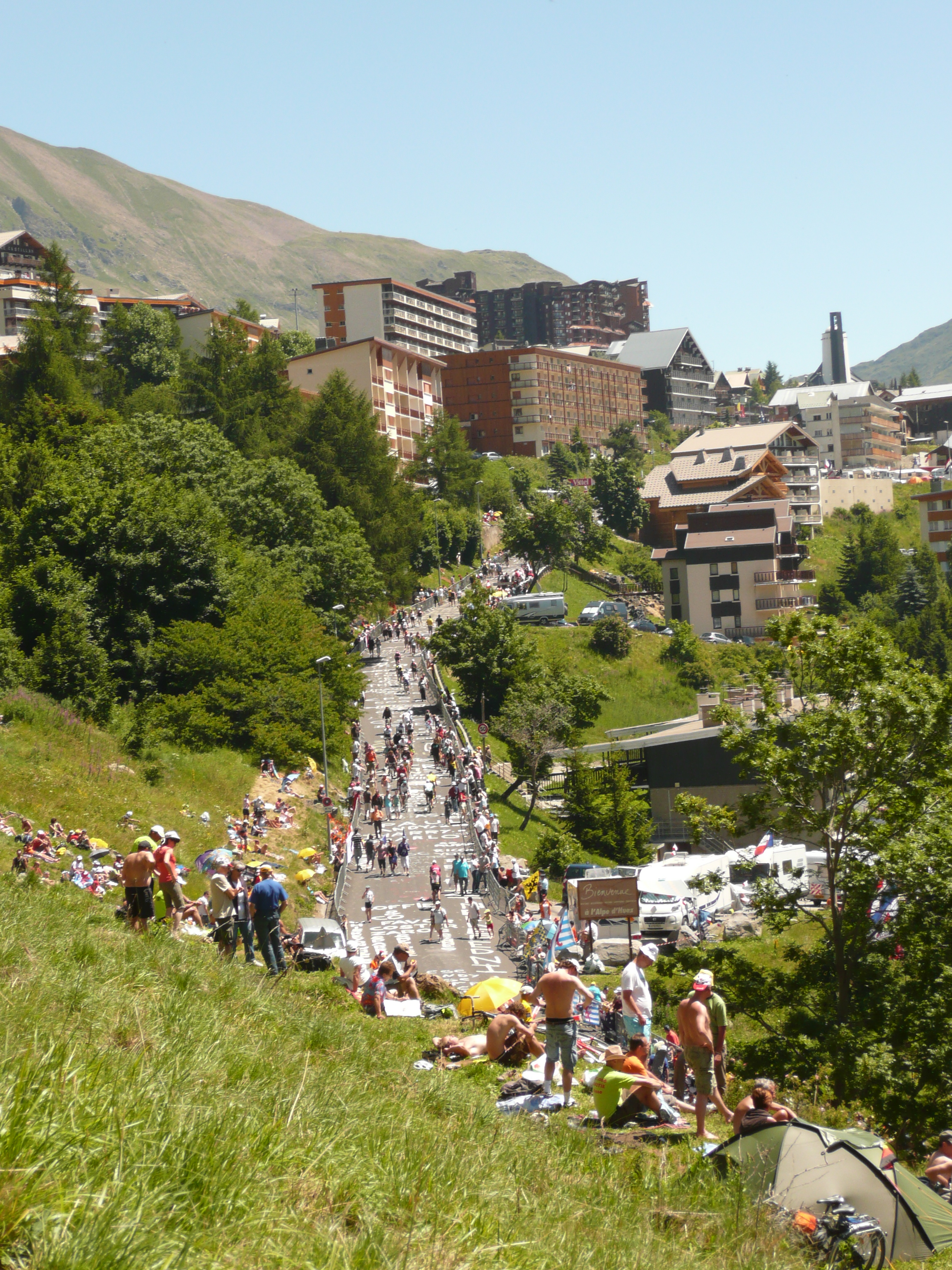
- Alpe d'Huez

- Coat of arms
- Location of Huez
- Location within France Location within Auvergne-Rhône-Alpes
- Coordinates: 45°05′00″N 6°03′36″E
- Country: France
- Region: Auvergne-Rhône-Alpes
- Department: Isère
- Arrondissement: Grenoble
- Canton: Oisans-Romanche

Government
  - Mayor (2020–2026): Jean-Yves Noyrey
- Area^{1}: 14 km^{2} (5.4 sq mi)
- Highest elevation: 3,081 m (10,108 ft)
- Lowest elevation: 1,024 m (3,360 ft)
- Population (2023): 1,244
  - Density: 89/km^{2} (230/sq mi)
- Time zone: UTC+01:00 (CET)
  - Summer (DST): UTC+02:00 (CEST)
- INSEE/Postal code: 38191 /38750
- ^{1} French Land Register data, which excludes lakes, ponds, glaciers > 1 km^{2} (0.386 sq mi or 247 acres) and river estuaries.

Huez (French pronunciation: [ɥɛz]) is a commune in the Isère department in southeastern France. The mountain resort Alpe d'Huez is located in the commune. L'Alpe d'Huez is often an ascent on the Tour de France.

== Population ==
Historical population
Year	Pop.	±% p.a.
1968	619	—
1975	1,410	+12.48%
1982	1,154	−2.82%
1990	1,265	+1.15%
1999	1,671	+3.14%
2007	1,312	−2.98%
2012	1,411	+1.47%
2017	1,307	−1.52%
2023	1,244	−0.82%
Source: INSEE

== Twin towns ==
Huez is twinned with:

- Bormio, Italy, since 2005

== See also ==
- Alpe d'Huez
- Communes of the Isère department
