= Ray Wilkie =

Australian weather presenter (1925–2023)

Ray Wilkie OAM
- Ray Wilkie reporting the weather forecast on television.
- Born: 14 January 1925; Ayr, Queensland, Australia
- Died: 18 May 2023 (aged 98); Brisbane, Queensland, Australia
- Education: University of Queensland (BSc)
- Occupations: Meteorologist, television weather presenter
- Years active: 1945–2020
- Known for: Presenting television weather reports for the ABC, Nine Network and Network 10
- Television: Ten Eyewitness News
- Family: Alan Wilkie (younger brother)

William Raymond Wilkie (14 January 1925 – 18 May 2023) was an Australian meteorologist who worked with the Bureau of Meteorology, he was best known for presenting television weather reports. He delivered nightly weather reports firstly at the ABC and then for both the Nine Network with Nine News and for Network Ten, where he presented for Ten Eyewitness News and also Ten's national late night bulletin.

He was the elder brother of meteorologist and radio and TV weather reporter Alan Wilkie

== Biography ==
=== Early life ===
William Raymond Wilkie was born in Ayr, Queensland on 14 January 1925. to William Wilkie senior (born c.1892) and Daisy Isobel Lewis (c. 1900-1945), his mother died when he was 20 and his younger brother Allan was 16 Wilkie served with the Royal Australian Air Force as a flight lieutenant, where he was posted in England and Europe. He graduated from the University of Queensland with a Bachelor of Science and then studied meteorology in Melbourne.

=== Career ===
Wilkie obtained employment with the Bureau of Meteorology, where he worked for 35 years. During this time, he served as a regional director in Brisbane and in Darwin.

Wilkie was on duty in the Darwin office in 1974 when Cyclone Tracy struck the city. He was subsequently involved in the establishment of the Bureau's Tropical Cyclone Warning Centre (TCWC).

Wilkie started in career in television presenting weather reports in 1956, on the ABC and spent 14 years at the Nine Network from 1977 and 1991

From 1985, he worked for Network Ten in Brisbane where he presented weather bulletin's for Ten Eyewitness News. From 1991, he also presented the weather on Ten Eyewitness News with Katrina Lee and John Mangos for Ten's Sydney Bulletin and also presented for the national late news bulletin.

In 1988, he authored a book called Ray Wilkie's Australian Weather where he recounted his experience during Cyclone Tracy.

=== Personal life ===
Ray Wilkie brother of Alan Wilkie, a meteorologist and television weather presenter based in Sydney, who also worked for the Commonwealth of Meteorology from 1950 and 1960, and became the first weather presenter on television presenting at the ABC from 1956 to 1960, and then the Seven Network from 1968 to 1976, but was best known for his 25 year tenure presenting bulletins on National Nine News from 1977 until 2001. Alan died in Sydney, New South Wales on 10 July 2023, at the age of 94.

=== Honours ===
In 1977, Wilkie received a Queen Elizabeth II Silver Jubilee Medal.

In 1984, he was awarded an OAM in the 1984 Australia Day Honours in recognition of his public service.

In 2020, he underwent surgery at Greenslopes Private Hospital to correct a bowel condition.

=== Death ===
Ray Wilkie died in Brisbane, Queensland on 18 May 2023, at the age of 98.
