= Kızık =

Kızık was the name of one of the tribes of the Oghuz Turks. It may also refer to:

- Kızık, Akyurt, a neighborhood of the district of Akyurt, Ankara Province, Turkey
- Kızık, Gümüşhacıköy, a village in the district of Gümüşhacıköy, Amasya Province, Turkey
- Kızık, Kızılcahamam, a village in the district of Kızılcahamam, Ankara Province, Turkey
- Kızık, Manyas, a village in the Manyas district, Balıkesir Province, Turkey
- Kızık, Sandıklı, a village in the district of Sandıklı, Afyonkarahisar Province, Turkey
- Kızık, Seben, a village in the Seben district, Bolu Province, Turkey
