= Killing of Tayla and Murphy Cox =

2023 murders in Rockhampton, Australia

On 8 August 2023, Tayla Cox (née Black) and her daughter Murphy Margaret Cox were allegedly murdered in their home in Park Avenue, a suburb of Rockhampton in Queensland, Australia, by Matthew James Cox, Tayla's husband and Murphy's father. Tayla was the 43rd Australian woman killed in 2023 and Murphy was the 10th Australian child killed in 2023.

Cox, 31, allegedly left work early before returning to their family home in Park Avenue and committing the murders that afternoon. He then fled Rockhampton after the attacks and waited two days to tell Brisbane police about the crimes. Rockhampton Police found the bodies of 30-year-old Tayla and 11-week-old Murphy on 10 August 2023. That same day, Cox's vehicle was located at Rockhampton Airport and taken by police for forensic investigation. Detective superintendent Darrin Shadlow of Rockhampton Police denied reports of a gunshot being heard from the residence on the day of the murders, however he would not comment on how the mother and infant were killed.

As of February 2024, Cox has been charged with two counts of murder, is currently incarcerated and awaiting trial. His case was adjourned to 6 March 2024, pending DNA evidence.

In December 2024, Cox's lawyers applied for the funding of a psychiatric report. In February 2025, lawyers reported in Rockhampton Magistrates Court that the request was in the review process.
