= Shark Tank season 11 =

Shark Tank
- Season 11
- No. of episodes: 24

Release
- Original network: ABC
- Original release: September 29, 2019 – May 15, 2020

Season chronology
- ← Previous; Season 10 Next → Season 12

This is a list of episodes from the eleventh season of Shark Tank. The season premiered on Sunday, September 29, 2019 on ABC.

== Episodes ==
Guest sharks this season include Katrina Lake, founder and CEO of Stitch Fix; Daniel Lubetzky, founder and CEO of Kind; tennis player Maria Sharapova; and Anne Wojcicki, CEO and co-founder of 23andMe. Recurring Sharks include Rohan Oza and Matt Higgins.

No. overall	No. in season	Title	Original release date	Prod. code	U.S. viewers (millions)
223	1	"Episode 1"	September 29, 2019	1101	3.82
Sharks: Mark, Daniel Lubetzky, Kevin, Lori, Robert Blueland (YES); MinusCal (NO); The BabyToon (YES); TaDah! (YES)
224	2	"Episode 2"	October 6, 2019	1102	3.84
Sharks: Mark, Barbara, Kevin, Lori, Rohan Oza Circadian Optics (YES); Boost Oxygen (YES); Face Yoga with Koko (NO); Atlas Monroe (NO); Update on Mush
225	3	"Episode 3"	October 13, 2019	1104	3.56
Sharks: Mark, Daymond, Kevin, Lori, Robert Eterneva (YES); Baobab (NO); Aira (YES); Squid Socks (YES); Update on Changed
226	4	"Episode 4"	October 20, 2019	1105	3.28
Sharks: Mark, Barbara, Kevin, Lori, Rohan Oza Knife Aid (YES); Bug Bite Thing (YES); Plop Star (NO); Snacklins (YES); Update on Buttercloth
227	5	"Episode 5"	October 27, 2019	1103	2.89
Sharks: Mark, Daymond, Kevin, Lori, Matt Higgins Tailgate N Go (YES); Nerdit Now (NO); Golfkicks (YES); Myo Storm (YES); Update on Treat Right
228	6	"Episode 6"	November 3, 2019	1107	3.44
Sharks: Mark, Daniel Lubetzky, Kevin, Lori, Robert The Measuring Shovel (YES); Pili Hunters (NO); Supply (YES); EZC Pak (YES); Update on Moink
229	7	"Episode 7"	November 10, 2019	1109	3.51
Sharks: Mark, Daymond, Kevin, Lori, Robert Baubles + Soles (YES); Dog Threads (YES); Peanut Butter Pump (NO); The Yard (YES); Update on Radiate
230	8	"Episode 8"	November 17, 2019	1111	3.30
Sharks: Mark, Anne Wojcicki, Kevin, Lori, Daymond Gallant (YES); Mrs. Goldfarb's Unreal Deli (YES); Terra-Core (YES); Outer (YES)
231	9	"Episode 9"	December 1, 2019	1110	2.92
Sharks: Mark, Barbara, Kevin, Lori, Robert Easy Treezy (NO); Beardaments (YES); Kit Lender (NO); Little ELF (YES); Update on Hire Santa
232	10	"Episode 10"	January 5, 2020	1108	2.85
Sharks: Mark, Barbara, Kevin, Lori, Robert Slumberpod (YES); Fortress (NO); Zuum (NO); Flexscreen (YES)
233	11	"Episode 11"	January 12, 2020	1112	2.75
Sharks: Mark, Barbara, Kevin, Lori, Daymond Wise Pocket Products (YES); Kreyòl Essence (YES); Lovesync (NO); Wanna Date? (YES); Update on Squatty Potty
234	12	"Episode 12"	January 19, 2020	1115	2.72
Sharks: Mark, Barbara, Kevin, Lori, Rohan Oza Genius Juice (YES); Rapid Rope (YES); Ready, Set, Food! (YES); Ka-Pop! Ancient Grain Snack Co. (NO); Update on Nohbo
235	13	"Episode 13"	February 28, 2020	1113	4.14
Sharks: Mark, Maria Sharapova, Kevin, Lori, Daymond Bala Bangles (YES); Shake It Pup! (YES); Pips & Bounce (NO); Fur (YES); Profile on Maria Sharapova
236	14	"Episode 14"	March 6, 2020	1106	4.34
Sharks: Mark, Katrina Lake, Kevin, Lori, Robert Bite Toothpaste Bits (NO); Baby Quip (NO); Coconut Girl (YES); Pair Eyewear (YES); Profile on Katrina Lake
237	15	"Episode 15"	March 13, 2020	1118	4.72
Sharks: Mark, Barbara, Kevin, Lori, Robert K!ds Luv (NO); Swimply (NO); Space Traveler (YES); Bertello (YES); Update on Everlywell
238	16	"Episode 16"	March 20, 2020	1117	5.99
Sharks: Mark, Barbara, Kevin, Lori, Rohan Oza Boho (YES); Bohana (YES); Grouphug (YES); Safety Nailer (YES); Update on Bombas
239	17	"Episode 17"	March 27, 2020	1116	5.27
Sharks: Mark, Barbara, Kevin, Lori, Daymond Pasta by Hudson (YES); Goumi (YES); Critter Pricker (YES); The Frozen Farmers (YES); Update on Press Waffle Co.
240	18	"Episode 18"	April 3, 2020	1119	5.19
Sharks: Mark, Daymond, Kevin, Lori, Robert Muvez (YES); Prepwell Academy (NO); Beddley (NO); Bad Birdie (YES); Update on Mother Beverage
241	19	"Episode 19"	April 10, 2020	1120	4.83
Sharks: Mark, Daniel Lubetzky, Kevin, Lori, Robert Just The Cheese (NO); Neuro (NO); Seriously Slime (NO); First Saturday Lime (YES); Update on Tailgate N Go
242	20	"Episode 20"	May 1, 2020	1121	4.82
Sharks: Mark, Barbara, Kevin, Lori, Daymond Fried Green Tomatoes (YES); Little Burros (NO); Jiggaerobics (NO); Mural Painter (YES); High School Sweepstakes
243	21	"Episode 21"	May 6, 2020	1114	2.39
Sharks: Mark, Anne Wojcicki, Kevin, Lori, Daymond Unbuckle Me (YES); Tanoshi (YES); Proven (NO); Van Robotics (NO); Update on Hatch Baby
244	22	"Episode 22"	May 8, 2020	1123	4.55
Sharks: Mark, Daymond, Kevin, Lori, Robert Tough Tie (YES); Lord Von Schmitt (NO); DadWare (NO); Potty Safe (YES); Sharks address the coronavirus pandemic
245	23	"Episode 23"	May 13, 2020	1122	2.27
Sharks: Mark, Barbara, Kevin, Lori, Rohan Oza MC Squares (YES); Rescue Ready (NO); Slate (NO); Salted (NO) Little Burro
246	24	"Episode 24"	May 15, 2020	1124	4.55
Sharks: Mark, Daniel Lubetzky, Kevin, Lori, Robert Dreamland Baby (YES); The Mad Optimist (YES); Rollin Greens (YES); Yellow Leaf Hammocks (YES); Season 11 recap
