= Shark Tank season 17 =

Shark Tank
- Season 17
- No. of episodes: 18

Release
- Original network: ABC
- Original release: September 24, 2025 – April 22, 2026

Season chronology
- ← Previous; Season 16 Next → Season 18

This is a list of episodes from the seventeenth season of Shark Tank. The season premiered on September 24, 2025, on ABC and concluded on April 22, 2026.

== Episodes ==
Guest Sharks include Allison Ellsworth, founder of Poppi, Chip and Joanna Gaines, co-founders of Magnolia Network, Alexis Ohanian, Reddit co-founder, Kendra Scott, Michael Strahan, Good Morning America co-anchor, Fawn Weaver, CEO of Uncle Nearest Premium Whiskey, and Rashaun Williams, venture capitalist.

No. overall	No. in season	Title	Original release date	Prod. code	U.S. viewers (millions)
360	1	"Big Sock Energy: Comedian Pete Davidson Is in the Tank"	September 24, 2025	1703	1.88
Sharks: Rashaun, Kendra, Kevin, Lori, Robert
361	2	"Michael Strahan Brings His Business Game to the Tank"	October 1, 2025	1701	1.60
Sharks: Michael Strahan, Barbara, Kevin, Lori, Robert
362	3	"First Power Couple: Chip and Joanna Gaines Dive-in"	October 8, 2025	1702	1.61
Sharks: Barbara, Chip Gaines & Joanna Gaines, Kevin, Lori, Daniel
363	4	"Startup Legend Alexis Ohanian Makes His Mark"	October 22, 2025	1704	1.57
Sharks: Kendra, Alexis Ohanian, Kevin, Lori, Daymond
364	5	"History Is Made: Allison Ellsworth Returns"	November 5, 2025	1705	1.37
Sharks: Robert, Allison Ellsworth, Kevin, Lori, Daymond
365	6	"Revolutionizing Sound: 3D Printed Instruments Shake Up the Music Biz"	November 12, 2025	1707	1.39
Sharks: Daymond, Barbara, Kevin, Lori, Daniel
366	7	"Cash or Coal?: The Sharks Get Into the Holiday Spirit with Festive Pitches & Products"	December 10, 2025	1708	1.92
Sharks: Daymond, Barbara, Kevin, Lori, Daniel
367	8	"Urine for a Surprise: Would NFL Legend Michael Strahan Use This Personal Product in Public?"	January 7, 2026	1709	1.60
Sharks: Michael Strahan, Barbara, Kevin, Lori, Robert
368	9	"5 Sharks and a Baby: Can This New Invention Provide Sleep for Newborns and Their Parents?"	January 14, 2026	1710	N/A
Sharks: Rashaun, Kendra, Kevin, Lori, Robert
369	10	"Dating in the Wild: Will the Sharks Say Yes to a Unique Dating App? Alexis Ohanian Returns"	January 21, 2026	1711	N/A
Sharks: Kendra, Alexis Ohanian, Kevin, Lori, Daymond
370	11	"Snooze You Lose: Do the Sharks Wake Up to this Ingenious New Dorm Bed? Chip & Joanna Gaines Return to the Tank"	January 28, 2026	1713	N/A
Sharks: Barbara, Chip Gaines & Joanna Gaines, Kevin, Lori, Daniel
371	12	"New Guest Shark: Fawn Weaver, Founder of One of the Fastest Growing Premium Whiskeys Joins the Tank!"	March 4, 2026	1706	N/A
Sharks: Daniel, Fawn Weaver, Kevin, Lori, Robert
372	13	"Pop or Fizzle? Will Guest Shark, Beverage Billionaire Allison Ellsworth Take a Chance on a Soda Newbie?"	March 11, 2026	1712	N/A
Sharks: Robert, Allison Ellsworth, Kevin, Lori, Daymond
373	14	"Girl Power: Will Guest Shark, Beverage Mogul Fawn Weaver, Buy Into a Beer Made for Women?"	March 18, 2026	1717	N/A
Sharks: Daniel, Fawn Weaver, Kevin, Lori, Robert
374	15	"Good Hang!: Mark Cuban's Back with an Exciting Update. Plus, Will a Picture-Hanging Invention Hook a Shark?"	March 25, 2026	1714	N/A
Sharks: Daymond, Barbara, Kevin, Lori, Rashaun
375	16	"Shark ATTACK: The Sharks Battle Over a Game-Changer Product for Athletes. WHO WINS?"	April 8, 2026 (Note: This episode was scheduled to air on April 1, 2026, but was replaced by a repeat of "Dating in the Wild: Will the Sharks Say Yes to a Unique Dating App? Alexis Ohanian Returns", due to a presidential address by President Donald Trump.)	1716	N/A
Sharks: Daniel, Kendra, Kevin, Lori, Rashaun
376	17	"Million Dollar Offer: See Which Shark Makes a Million Dollar Offer for a Never-Before-Seen Idea!"	April 15, 2026	1715	N/A
Sharks: Daymond, Barbara, Kevin, Lori, Rashaun
377	18	"Season Finale: Which Shark Will Get a Slice of a Unique Family Based Pizza Business? Plus an Update on Pete Davidson's Sock Company."	April 22, 2026	1718	N/A
Sharks: Daniel, Kendra, Kevin, Lori, Rashaun
