= Sneakerasers =

American sneaker-cleaning product manufacturer

Sneakerasers (stylized as SneakERASERS), formerly called Sole Rubbers, is an American manufacturer of sneaker-cleaning products.

Created by Ohio University alumni Chris Pavlica and Kevin Consolo, the product was designed to cheaply maintain the white color of rubber soles on sneakers. During an appearance on the twelfth season of Shark Tank, Pavlica and Consolo made a deal with Lori Greiner and Alex Rodriguez for a 20% stake in their company.

It was announced in December 2023, that the company had partnered with Skechers to manufacture SkechERASERS for the brand worldwide. In addition to brand partnerships, Sneakerasers has expanded its distribution through leading retailers. Following its win of a "golden ticket" at Walmart's Made in America Open Call event, Sneakerasers gained access to shelf space in thousands of Walmart stores across the United States.
