= Shark Tank season 18 =

Shark Tank
- Season 18
- No. of episodes: 3

Release
- Original network: ABC
- Original release: September 30, 2026 – present

Season chronology
- ← Previous; Season 17

This is a list of episodes from the eighteenth season of Shark Tank. The season premiered on September 30, 2026, on ABC.

== Episodes ==
After appearing as guest Sharks in previous seasons, Kendra Scott and Rashaun Williams were promoted to permanent Sharks. Season 18 guest Sharks include Jimmy "MrBeast" Donaldson, founder of Beast Industries; Jeffrey Housenbold, CEO of Beast Industries; writer, actor and author Mindy Kaling; J. J. Watt, former NFL defensive lineman; Erin and Sara Foster, producers and co-founders of Favorite Daughter; Steven Bartlett, entrepreneur and host of podcast, The Diary of a CEO.

No. overall	No. in season	Title	Original release date	Prod. code	U.S. viewers (millions)
378	1	"Beast Mode"	September 30, 2026	1801	1.91
Sharks: Jimmy "MrBeast" Donaldson & Jeffrey Housenbold, Barbara, Kevin, Lori, Daniel
379	2	"Favorite Daughters"	September 30, 2026	1802	1.68
Sharks: Erin & Sara Foster, Barbara, Kevin, Lori, Rashaun
380	3	"Diary of a Shark"	October 7, 2026	1803	N/A
Sharks: Daniel, Kendra, Kevin, Lori, Steven Bartlett
381	4	"The Mindy Project"	October 14, 2026	1804	TBD
Sharks: Kendra, Mindy Kaling, Kevin, Lori, Robert
382	5	"I Smell A Rat"	October 28, 2026	1805	TBD
Sharks: Daymond, Barbara, Kevin, Lori, Robert
383	6	"Kevin in a Head Lock"	November 4, 2026	1806	TBD
Sharks: Daniel, Kendra, Kevin, Lori, Rashaun
384	7	"Hoop Dreams"	November 11, 2026	1807	TBD
Sharks: Daymond, Barbara, Kevin, Lori, Rashaun
