= Shark Tank season 13 =

Shark Tank
- Season 13
- No. of episodes: 24

Release
- Original network: ABC
- Original release: October 8, 2021 – May 20, 2022

Season chronology
- ← Previous; Season 12 Next → Season 14

This is a list of episodes from the thirteenth season of Shark Tank. The season premiered on October 8, 2021, on ABC.

== Episodes ==
Guest sharks this season include Emma Grede, CEO and co-founder of Good American and founding partner of Skims; actor and comedian Kevin Hart; Peter Jones, dragon on Dragons' Den; Daniel Lubetzky, founder and executive chairman of Kind; and Nirav Tolia, co-founder of Nextdoor.

No. overall	No. in season	Title	Original release date	Prod. code	U.S. viewers (millions)
272	1	"Episode 1"	October 8, 2021	1301	3.72
Sharks: Mark, Barbara, Kevin, Lori, Emma Grede "Kin" comfortable, satin-lined hoodies that make good haircare for the person wearing it (YES); "Uprising" keto, paleo bread cubes (NO); "Lion Latch" portable mini storage container for your wedding ring (NO); "Paskho" clothes manufactured in local communities (NO); Profile on Emma Grede
273	2	"Episode 2"	October 15, 2021	1302	3.58
Sharks: Mark, Daymond, Kevin, Lori, Peter Jones "Songlorious" songwriting service (YES); "MuteMe" illuminated mute button for work-from-home environments (NO); "Proper Good" heat-em-up soups and healthy meals to go (YES); "Long Wharf" eco-friendly clothes (NO); Profile on Peter Jones
274	3	"Episode 3"	October 22, 2021	1304	3.55
Sharks: Mark, Barbara, Kevin, Lori, Daniel Lubetzky "Sparketh" digital, on-demand art classes for kids and teens learning to inspire their creativity (YES); "OatHaus" granola butter (NO); "Flasky Flowers" flowers with a flask so you can drink out of the bouquet (YES); "Incredible Eats" edible utensils that save the planet by using less single use plastics (YES); Update on M.C. Squares
275	4	"Episode 4"	October 29, 2021	1303	3.80
Sharks: Mark, Nirav Tolia, Kevin, Lori, Robert "Magic 5" custom-fit, made-to-measure swimming goggles (YES); "Tabby" the cat person's dating app (YES); "SoaPen" colorful, soap-filled pen that makes it fun for kids to wash their hands (YES); "54 Thrones" clean African beauty brand (YES); Profile on Nirav Tolia
276	5	"Episode 5"	November 5, 2021	1306	3.95
Sharks: Mark, Daymond, Kevin, Lori, Robert "Wedfuly" virtual wedding planning service (YES); "Wad-Free" gadget that prevents bedding from tangling in the washing machine and dryer (YES); "Beulr" app that allows you to be in two places at once (NO); "Spergo" trendy clothing brand (YES); Update on Snacklins
277	6	"Episode 6"	November 12, 2021	1307	3.58
Sharks: Mark, Nirav Tolia, Kevin, Lori, Robert "Fish Fixe" fish delivery service (YES); "Hello Prenup" online platform for creating prenups (YES); "Deux" cookie dough with functional ingredients (NO); "Hidrent" online platform that matches off-duty firefighters with local community members who need home projects completed (YES); Update on Bertello
278	7	"Episode 7"	November 19, 2021	1310	4.34
Sharks: Mark, Barbara, Kevin, Lori, Daniel Lubetzky "Sheets Laundry Club" eco-friendly detergent sheets (YES); "Pink Picasso" paint-by-number kits (YES); "Love & Pebble" frozen face masks (NO); "Zach & Zoe Sweet Bee Farm" family-run raw honey business (YES); Update on "Dude Products"
279	8	"Episode 8"	December 10, 2021	1308	3.57
Sharks: Mark, Barbara, Kevin, Lori, Daymond "Wendy's Gnome Shop" handmade home decor gnomes (YES); "Ornament Anchor" product that ensures ornaments stay on the Christmas tree (NO); "The Real Elf" online platform for spreading holiday cheer (YES); "Santa's Enchanted Mailbox" magical mailbox for communicating with Santa and his elves (NO); Update on Holiball
280	9	"Episode 9"	December 17, 2021	1311	3.67
Sharks: Mark, Daymond, Kevin, Lori, Robert "Maxpro Fitness" portable exercise cable machine (YES); "Banana Loca" gadget that allows you to fill the inside of a banana (YES); "Liberate Studio" online mental fitness studio (NO); "Tenikle" product used for hands-free device holding (YES); Update on "Everything Legendary"
281	10	"Episode 10"	January 7, 2022	1312	4.59
Sharks: Mark, Kevin Hart, Kevin, Lori, Barbara "Snactiv" ergonomic snacking tool (YES); "Smart Tire Company" airless tire made from space-age materials (NO); "Candi" social network for chatting with celebrities and influencers (NO); "Black Sands Entertainment" Black-owned comic publishing house (YES); Profile on Kevin Hart
282	11	"Episode 11"	January 14, 2022	1309	3.85
Sharks: Mark, Daymond, Kevin, Lori, Peter Jones "VaBroom" 2-in-1 broom and vacuum cleaner (YES); "Must Love" non-dairy ice cream (NO); "Romperjack" rompers for men (NO); "Roq Innovation" wearable head lights (YES); Update on "Quevos"
283	12	"Episode 12"	January 21, 2022	1305	4.20
Sharks: Mark, Barbara, Kevin, Lori, Daymond
284	13	"Episode 13"	January 28, 2022	1314	3.90
Sharks: Mark, Daymond, Kevin, Lori, Robert
285	14	"Episode 14"	February 25, 2022	1315	3.45
Sharks: Mark, Barbara, Kevin, Lori, Emma Grede
286	15	"Episode 15"	March 11, 2022	1317	3.55
Sharks: Mark, Barbara, Kevin, Lori, Daymond
287	16	"Episode 16"	March 18, 2022	1320	3.43
Sharks: Mark, Barbara, Kevin, Lori, Daniel Lubetzky
288	17	"Episode 17"	March 25, 2022	1316	3.43
Sharks: Mark, Daymond, Kevin, Lori, Robert
289	18	"Episode 18"	April 1, 2022	1318	3.50
Sharks: Mark, Emma Grede, Kevin, Lori, Robert
290	19	"Episode 19"	April 8, 2022	1321	3.76
Sharks: Mark, Daymond, Kevin, Lori, Robert
291	20	"Episode 20"	April 15, 2022	1319	3.74
Sharks: Mark, Daymond, Kevin, Lori, Robert
292	21	"Episode 21"	May 2, 2022	1322	3.56
Sharks: Mark, Barbara, Kevin, Lori, Robert
293	22	"Episode 22"	May 6, 2022	1323	3.62
Sharks: Mark, Barbara, Kevin, Lori, Emma Grede
294	23	"Episode 23"	May 13, 2022	1324	3.34
Sharks: Mark, Daymond, Kevin, Lori, Robert
295	24	"Episode 24"	May 20, 2022	1313	3.59
Sharks: Mark, Kevin Hart, Kevin, Lori, Barbara
