= Shark Tank season 12 =

Shark Tank
- Season 12
- No. of episodes: 25

Release
- Original network: ABC
- Original release: October 16, 2020 – May 21, 2021

Season chronology
- ← Previous; Season 11 Next → Season 13

This is a list of episodes from the twelfth season of Shark Tank. The season premiered on October 16, 2020, on ABC.

The 12th season was filmed inside a production bubble at the Venetian Las Vegas to allow for social distancing during the COVID-19 pandemic.

== Episodes ==
Guest sharks this season include Blake Mycoskie, founder of TOMS and co-founder of Madefor, and Kendra Scott, founder and CEO of Kendra Scott LLC. Returning guest Sharks include Alex Rodriguez, baseball player and founder and CEO of A-Rod Corp, and Daniel Lubetzky, founder and executive chairman of Kind.

| No. overall | No. in season | Title | Original release date | Prod. code | U.S. viewers (millions) |
|---|---|---|---|---|---|
| 247 | 1 | "Episode 1" | October 16, 2020 | 1201 | 4.03 |
Sharks: Mark, Blake Mycoskie, Kevin, Lori, Daymond Touch Up Cup; a paint storage cup (YES), SparkCharge; a portable electric car charger (YES), GarmaGuard; a germ killing spray (NO), Rumpl; high performance blankets (NO); profile on Blake Mycoskie
| 248 | 2 | "Episode 2" | October 23, 2020 | 1202 | 3.90 |
Sharks: Mark, Kendra Scott, Kevin, Lori, Barbara BootayBag; a women's bikini and undergarment subscription service (YES), GoOats; on the go fried oatmeal balls (YES), Pooch Paper; eco-friendly paper alternative to dog waste bags (YES), PNuff Crunch; peanut flavored crunch snacks (YES); profile on Kendra Scott
| 249 | 3 | "Episode 3" | October 30, 2020 | 1203 | 4.42 |
Sharks: Mark, Daymond, Kevin, Lori, Robert Hug Sleep; body-covering adult swaddle design to help the user sleep (YES), Animated Lure; lifelike fish bait (YES), The Cereal Killerz Kitchen; Las Vegas restaurant that sells cereal combos (NO), Chirp; wheel that you roll on your back to relieve soreness (YES); update on Bala Bangles
| 250 | 4 | "Episode 4" | November 6, 2020 | 1205 | 2.31 |
Sharks: Mark, Barbara, Kevin, Lori, Daymond Jada Spices; vegan turmeric and chicken salt company (YES), Surprise Cake; gift pods to be placed inside a cake (NO), The Mighty Carver; electric carving knife that resembles a chainsaw (YES), Flipstik; a phone accessory that can make the user stick it's phone to any surface (YES); update on Blueland
| 251 | 5 | "Episode 5" | November 13, 2020 | 1204 | 4.55 |
Sharks: Mark, Daniel Lubetzky, Kevin, Lori, Robert Fitfighter; a weighted hose usable for workouts (YES), Liftid Neurostimulation; a headband that gives the users a boost of energy to their frontal lobe to increase focus (NO), Foam Party Hats; alternative, goofy looking party hats made from foam (YES), Bee D'Vine; wine made from honey (YES); update on Unreal Deli
| 252 | 6 | "Episode 6" | November 20, 2020 | 1206 | 4.29 |
Sharks: Mark, Blake Mycoskie, Kevin, Lori, Daymond Pan's Mushroom Jerky; vegan beef jerky made from mushrooms (YES), K9 Mask; a face mask for dogs (YES), Moment; meditation canned beverages made from healthy extracts (NO), Prime6; eco-friendly charcoal made from recycled sawdust (YES); update on Mo's Bows and Me & The Bees
| 253 | 7 | "Episode 7" | December 4, 2020 | 1207 | 4.06 |
Sharks: Mark, Barbara, Kevin, Lori, Daymond The Holiball; big, inflatable, Christmas ornaments (YES), Toilet Timer; gag gift to help stop lingering on the bathroom (YES), ODR Skis; manual ski shoes that you can use to ski down mountains without skis (NO), Buckle Me Baby Coats; winter coats for you to put on your baby to protect them from car accidents (YES); update on Hungry Harvest
| 254 | 8 | "Episode 8" | December 11, 2020 | 1125 | 3.98 |
Sharks: Mark, Barbara, Kevin, Lori, Robert Peekaboo; ice cream with hidden vegetables inside (NO), Brake Free; light to put on back of helmets to increase visibility of motorcycles in the night (YES), Click & Carry; convenient, hands-free way to carry shopping bags without any weight worry (YES), Codi by Pillar Learning; educational, interactive, robot (YES); update on various Shark Tank companies as they adapt to the COVID-19 pandemic
| 255 | 9 | "Episode 9" | January 8, 2021 | 1210 | 4.68 |
Sharks: Mark, Barbara, Kevin, Lori, Daymond Electra; healthier sports hydration drink filled with fruity flavors and none of the processed additives of a typical sports drink (YES), ALL33; chair made to fix back posture to avoid back pain (NO), His and Her Bar; lifestyle aphrodisiac snack bar (NO), Trophy Smack; customizable fantasy trophies usable for props, parties, or events (YES); update on Basepaws
| 256 | 10 | "Episode 10" | January 15, 2021 | 1211 | 4.39 |
Sharks: Mark, Kevin, Lori, Barbara, Alex Rodriguez Slice of Sauce; cheese-style slices with flavors of sauce (YES), Love is Project; artisan made designs from around the world to spread love to worldwide cultures (NO), Luna Magic; Afro-Latina inspired beauty, fashion, and lifestyle brand (YES), Bubbly Blaster; gadget that you attach onto your champagne bottle, making your champagne function as a gun (YES); update on Alice's Table
| 257 | 11 | "Episode 11" | January 22, 2021 | 1213 | 4.20 |
Sharks: Mark, Daniel, Kevin, Lori, Robert Quevos; chips made with the crustier side of egg and omelet whites (YES), Brumachen; an innovative way to carry coffee and make coffee at the same time (NO), Aura Bora; superfruit water made with real herbs and other all-natural ingredients (YES), Swipensnap; double threaded cream applicator (YES); update on The Baby Toon
| 258 | 12 | "Episode 12" | February 5, 2021 | 1208 | 4.68 |
Sharks: Mark, Barbara, Kevin, Lori, Daymond Yono Clip; portable suction cup bag hanger that you can attach to any wall to keep your bags to catch flood germs (YES), NightCap; a cover for cups to prevent drink spiking (YES), Rule Breaker; snack bars made with a small amount of sugar, but not as a main ingredient, with chickpeas replacing sugar as the main ingredients (NO), MountainFlow Eco-Wax; eco friendly ski wax (YES); update on Daisy Cakes and Pipsnacks
| 259 | 13 | "Episode 13" | February 12, 2021 | 1209 | 4.38 |
Sharks: Mark, Daymond, Kevin, Lori, Robert Jax Sheets; copper-infused fabrics that eliminate bacteria so if you don’t do your laundry for a year nobody will notice (NO), The Pizza Cupcake; pizza flavored bagels shaped like cupcakes (YES), IceBeanie; cooler technology in a beanie to relieve chronic stress headaches, especially after high energy sports games (YES), Draft Top; can opener to remove can tops from draft beer, as well as any other canned beverages (YES); update on Boho Camper Vans
| 260 | 14 | "Episode 14" | February 19, 2021 | 1214 | 4.64 |
Sharks: Mark, Kendra Scott, Kevin, Lori, Barbara Pashion Footwear; sexy and comfortable high heels for women (NO), Souper Cubes; storing food in squares for more effective storage and food eating results (YES), Byoot Company; bathing suit brands for women that look sexy and solve a problem of comfortability (YES), Sienna Sauce; barbecue sauce that can be used in food recipes (YES); update on Doc Spartan
| 261 | 15 | "Episode 15" | February 26, 2021 | 1212 | 4.60 |
Sharks: Mark, Barbara, Kevin, Lori, Daymond Better Bedder; item to hold bed sheets in place to help making your bed easier (YES), Everything Legendary; vegan gourmet burger (YES), Walkee Paws; all-in-one legging and socks for dogs to help fight germs and dirt (NO), Hopscotch; game creation tool for kids learning how to code (YES); update on Flexscreen
| 262 | 16 | "Episode 16" | March 5, 2021 | 1217 | 4.62 |
Sharks: Mark, Daymond, Kevin, Lori, Robert Simply Good Jars; on the go jars of healthy foods (YES), Pinch Me Therapy Dough; ASMR putty to be pinched to stimulate stress relief (YES), Muff Waders; overall with pop-out drink carrier holders in them (NO), BusyBaby Mat; mat for babies with little ticks and switches to keep them occupied and distracted so you don’t experience the hassle (NO); update on Twist It Up Comb
| 263 | 17 | "Episode 17" | March 12, 2021 | 1216 | 4.08 |
Sharks: Mark, Daniel, Kevin, Lori, Robert Misfit Foods; meats that are half meat, half vegetables (YES), Chill Systems; drink coolers that only hold 3 drinks and are made with sustainable materials (NO), Tandem Boogie; a body board that can fit two people (YES), Totes Babies; car seat carrier for your babies to carry them in a shopping cart (YES); update on Hug Sleep
| 264 | 18 | "Episode 18" | March 26, 2021 | 1219 | 4.02 |
Sharks: Mark, Barbara, Kevin, Lori, Daymond NuMilk; vegan milk that you can either buy through e-commerce, or find a franchise location that makes the product and more (YES), Hairy Grabster; device you attach to your shower that you rub your hair against to stop hair from falling out of the shower floor (NO), Mad Rabbit; tattoo aftercare lotion that after applying, enhances your tattoo by making it more bold (YES), Bunch Bikes; bringing bikes with baskets that the whole family can ride in together to the US (YES); update on Prime 6
| 265 | 19 | "Episode 19" | April 2, 2021 | 1220 | 3.88 |
Sharks: Mark, Daymond, Kevin, Lori, Robert StepNPull; door extension that you step on to open the door without using the doorknob to prevent germ spreading (YES), DynoSafe; temperature controlled porch safe for your packages to deter porch pirates (YES), Probiotic Maker; heating pad for probiotics to organically make them at home as opposed to store buying probiotics, wasting them in the process (NO), Phoozy: phone suit for outdoor emergencies (YES); update on Pan's Mushroom Jerky
| 266 | 20 | "Episode 20" | April 9, 2021 | 1215 | 4.31 |
Sharks: Mark, Kendra Scott, Kevin, Lori, Barbara OpulenceMD Beauty; magnetic faux eyelashes that can be applied with eyeliner (YES), The Cheese Chopper; 3-in-one cheese slicer, shredder, and storer (NO), The Matte; sink countertop for makeup storage while applying makeup (YES), FurZapper; silicone device that you put into the laundry machine alongside a shirt with fur on it to remove fur from said shirt (YES); update on Fitfighter
| 267 | 21 | "Episode 21" | April 16, 2021 | 1218 | 4.07 |
Sharks: Mark, Daymond, Kevin, Lori, Robert Truffle Shuffle; truffle meals that come with cooking tips and learning alongside them (YES), Suds2Go; portable handwashing system and handwashing bottle caps (YES), Salad Sling; vegetable drying device where you put your vegetables in the device, gather the device’s handles, and spin the device around like a lasso, using the air pressure to remove the water that comes from washing the veggies (NO), Larq; self-cleaning water bottle that purifies water on the go (YES); update on Yellow Leaf Hammock
| 268 | 22 | "Episode 22" | April 23, 2021 | 1224 | 4.13 |
Sharks: Mark, Daniel, Kevin, Lori, Robert Jiggy Puzzles; puzzles by locally submitted artists (YES), The Scrubbie; circle sponge that you can attach to your sink or hose to effectively remove stains (NO), The Bumbling Bee; vegan junk food restaurant franchise (NO), XTorch; rechargeable solar powered flashlight (NO); update on Bug Bite Thing
| 269 | 23 | "Episode 23" | May 7, 2021 | 1223 | 3.61 |
Sharks: Mark, Barbara, Kevin, Lori, Alex Grind; portable basketball training machine (YES), Creation Nation; organic cookie mix (NO), Sneakerasers; clean-tech erasers for your sneakers to remove dirt, with other products that do the same for other materials (YES), BEERMKR; stainless steel, at-home beer brewer (NO); update on Boost Oxygen
| 270 | 24 | "Episode 24" | May 14, 2021 | 1221 | 3.60 |
Sharks: Mark, Daniel, Kevin, Lori, Robert Pluto; customizable pillow designed for the users sleep system (NO), FlingGolf; innovative stick/club designed to play new sport on golf courses (YES), FloatNGrill; portable grill that uses grade A float-tech to float on water and grill meat on sea for parties (YES), The Original Stretchlace; shoelace that switches your shoe from laced to slip-ons, for people on the go (YES); update on The Frozen Farmer
| 271 | 25 | "Episode 25" | May 21, 2021 | 1222 | 3.55 |
Sharks: Mark, Daymond, Kevin, Lori, Robert DinoDon; realistic, life sized dinosaur animatronics that you can buy for yourself (YES), Copper Cow Coffee; pour-first Vietnamese sustainable coffee (YES), Lit Handlers; beverage coolers with many designs with handles on them (YES), Super Potty Trainer; back rest for babies potty training so they don’t fear falling into the toilet (YES); Season 12 recap
