= Drop Stop =

Interior interior car car accessory accessory

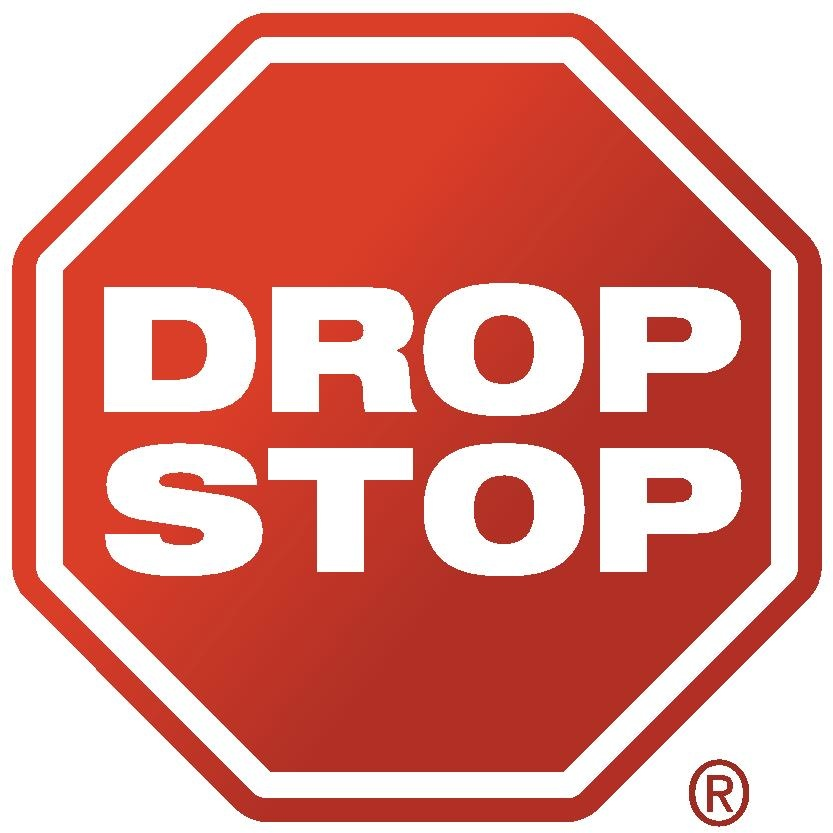

Drop Stop is a patented device designed to prevent items from falling between a car's front seats and center console. It was invented by Marc Newburger and Jeffrey Simon of Los Angeles.

Drop Stop is constructed out of black Neoprene filled with polyester fiberfill and is about 17 inches long. It has a slot sewn into it where the seat belt latch can fit through. This anchors the device, allowing the car seat to slide back-and-forth freely. According to Newburger and Simon, the space between the center console and the front seats is always in dark shadow and thus the black color of Drop Stop matches any car's interior. Provided the gap between a car's center console and seat is no less than 3.5 inches, Drop Stop should fit. However, some cars, for example the BMW M3 and Volkswagen Jetta, do not have enough space in the gap to fit the Drop Stop in place.

== History ==
The idea was born after Marc Newburger dropped a mobile phone down the gap between the seats of his car while driving and almost caused a serious accident trying to retrieve it. As of December 2017, 2.4 million Drop Stops have been sold with revenues totaling $24 million.

Drop Stop was featured on a segment of The Marilyn Denis Show entitled "The Best As Seen on TV Products", ABC's The View, and Shark Tank. On a special Shark Tank episode, which aired March 29, 2013, Lori Greiner introduced the product alongside the inventors, Newburger and Simon, who made a deal with Greiner for 20% equity in Drop Stop for $300,000. On a follow-up episode of Shark Tank, which aired on November 22, 2013, Drop Stop announced a $2,000,000 purchase order with Walmart. On March 19, 2014, Newburger and Simon were featured with their invention on The Queen Latifah Show wherein they were referred to as "some of Lori’s most successful inventors." On a second follow-up episode of Shark Tank, which aired on December 5, 2014, it was announced that Drop Stop was now available for sale in Bed Bath & Beyond, in a "Lori Greiner Shark Tank" branded display. In February 2015, Drop Stop was named one of the nine most successful Shark Tank businesses. On a follow-up episode of Shark Tank, which aired on January 21, 2018, it was revealed that the Los Angeles Police Department had performed a three-month long test during which time zero traffic-related accidents had occurred in police vehicles equipped with Drop Stop. As a result, the police department announced they would be outfitting 3,000 police vehicles with Drop Stops.
