= Shark Tank season 10 =

Shark Tank
- Season 10
- No. of episodes: 23

Release
- Original network: ABC
- Original release: October 7, 2018 – May 12, 2019

Season chronology
- ← Previous; Season 9 Next → Season 11

This is a list of episodes from the tenth season of Shark Tank.

== Episodes ==
Guest sharks for this season, subtitled "A Decade of Dreams," include Jamie Siminoff, the first guest shark to have sought a deal on the show (the sharks passed on his company Doorbot, now known as Ring).

No. overall	No. in season	Title	Original release date	Prod. code	U.S. viewers (millions)
200	1	"Episode 1"	October 7, 2018	1001	2.96
Sharks: Mark, Jamie Siminoff, Kevin, Lori, Daymond; BoxLock (NO), Le-Glue (YES), FinalStraw (NO), Bear Minimum (YES)
201	2	"Episode 2"	October 14, 2018	1003	3.64
Sharks: Mark, Barbara, Kevin, Lori, Robert; Shed Defender (YES), LugBug (NO), Ta-Ta Towel (YES), sanaía (YES) Update on: Slyde Handboards
202	3	"Episode 3"	October 21, 2018	1002	3.90
Sharks: Mark, Daymond, Kevin, Lori, Matt Higgins; Soupergirl (NO), Bundil (YES), Beyond Sushi (YES), Cup Board Pro (YES) Notes: Guy Vaknin, the owner of Beyond Sushi, previously competed on Season 10 of Gordon Ramsay's Hell's Kitchen in 2012, finishing in 13th place. Cup Board Pro received a deal from all five sharks.
203	4	"Episode 4"	October 28, 2018	1004	3.26
Sharks: Mark, Charles Barkley, Kevin, Lori, Robert; Manscaped (YES), BoomBoom (NO), Cave Shake (YES), Butter Cloth (YES)
204	5	"Episode 5"	November 18, 2018	1006	3.51
Sharks: Mark, Sara Blakely, Kevin, Lori, Barbara; The Handbag Raincoat (NO), RewardStock (YES), The WISP (NO), The Kombucha Shop (YES) Update on: Tanglepets
205	6	"Episode 6"	November 25, 2018	1007	3.48
Sharks: Alex Rodriguez, Barbara, Kevin, Lori, Mark; Vade Nutrition (YES), Lockstraps (NO), Bottlekeeper (YES), Nui (YES) Update on: Ice Shaker
206	7	"Episode 7"	December 2, 2018	1012	3.44
Sharks: Mark, Barbara, Kevin, Lori, Daymond; Hire Santa (YES), Ski-Z (YES), Prank-O (YES), OatMeals (YES) Update on: The Original Comfy
207	8	"Episode 8"	December 9, 2018	1005	3.40
Sharks: Mark, Bethenny Frankel, Kevin, Lori, Rohan Oza; Pop It Pal (YES), Yumble (YES), BollyX (NO), Mother Beverage (YES) Update on: Tipsy Elves
208	9	"Episode 9"	January 6, 2019	1008	3.70
Sharks: Mark, Daymond, Kevin, Lori, Robert; Moki Doorstep (YES), Sproing Fitness (NO), BRUW (YES), TushBaby (YES) Update on: Cycloramic
209	10	"Episode 10"	January 13, 2019	923	4.31
Sharks: Robert, Bethenny Frankel, Mark, Lori, Daymond; Adventure Hunt (YES), Uniform (NO), Pristine (YES), Aquapaw (NO) Update on: Goverre
210	11	"Episode 11"	January 20, 2019	1010	2.82
Sharks: Mark, Sara Blakely, Kevin, Lori, Barbara; Makeup Junkie Bags (YES), Angel Shave Club (NO), Kitty Kasas (YES), Sonnet James (YES) Update on: Pet Plate
211	12	"Episode 12"	January 27, 2019	1011	4.45
Sharks: Mark, Daymond, Kevin, Lori, Robert; ZuGoPet (NO), Obvious Wines (YES), Twist It Up Comb (YES), Monti Kids (YES) Update on: The Dough Bar
212	13	"Episode 13"	January 27, 2019	1009	3.79
Sharks: Mark, Charles Barkley, Kevin, Lori, Robert; Life Lift Systems (YES), Fresh Bellies (NO), SubSafe (YES), Zorpads (YES) Update on: Snarky Teas and No Mo-Stache
213	14	"Episode 14"	March 3, 2019	1016	4.13
Sharks: Mark, Alli Webb, Kevin, Lori, Robert; Zookies Cookies (YES), CurlMix (NO), GOGA Goat Yoga (NO), Shower Toga (YES)
214	15	"Episode 15"	March 10, 2019	1015	3.75
Sharks: Mark, Jamie Siminoff, Kevin, Lori, Daymond; Jolly Roger Telephone Co. (NO), Toybox Labs (YES), Goalsetter (NO), Moink (YES) Update on: Cousins Main Lobster
215	16	"Episode 16"	March 17, 2019	1013	3.77
Sharks: Mark, Daymond, Kevin, Lori, Matt Higgins; Urban Float (YES), Wild Earth (YES), Kudo Banz (NO), Pooch Selfie (YES)
216	17	"Episode 17"	March 24, 2019	1014	3.80
Sharks: Mark, Barbara, Kevin, Lori, Robert; Press Waffle Co. (YES), SilkRoll (NO), Pick-Up Pools (YES), Dare-U-Go (YES) Update on: Cut Buddy
217	18	"Episode 18"	April 7, 2019	1018	3.70
Sharks: Mark, Barbara, Kevin, Lori, Daymond; Nuchas (NO), HavenLock (NO), Kanga (YES), CertifiKID (YES) Update on: Eggmazing Egg Decorator
218	19	"Episode 19"	April 14, 2019	1017	3.80
Sharks: Mark, Barbara, Kevin, Lori, Rohan Oza; Pricetitution (YES), Hydroviv (YES), Flip-It! Cap (NO), Luma Soda (NO) Update on: Grypmat
219	20	"Episode 20"	April 21, 2019	1019	3.82
Sharks: Mark, Barbara, Kevin, Lori, Daymond; Mavens Creamery (YES), Spare (YES), Swoveralls (NO), Somnifix (YES) Update on: Bantam Bagels
220	21	"Episode 21"	April 28, 2019	1020	4.06
Sharks: Mark, Daymond, Kevin, Lori, Robert; Basepaws (YES), Best Pocket Square Holder (YES), Kymera Body Boards (YES), The Bang Shack (NO)
221	22	"Episode 22"	May 5, 2019	1021	3.62
Sharks: Mark, Barbara, Kevin, Lori, Robert; Cubicall (YES), Doughp (NO), Saucemoto (YES), Deskview (YES) Update on: Cup Board Pro
222	23	"Episode 23"	May 12, 2019	1022	3.87
Sharks: Mark, Daymond, Kevin, Lori, Robert; Quikflip (YES), Coyote Vest (NO), BatBnB (YES), Fat Shack (YES)
