= Shark Tank season 16 =

Shark Tank
- Season 16
- No. of episodes: 20

Release
- Original network: ABC
- Original release: October 18, 2024 – May 16, 2025

Season chronology
- ← Previous; Season 15 Next → Season 17

This is a list of episodes from the sixteenth season of Shark Tank. The season premiered on October 18, 2024, on ABC and concluded on May 16, 2025.

== Episodes ==
After appearing as a guest shark, Daniel Lubetzky has been promoted to one of the main sharks. This was Mark Cuban's last season as a main shark. Guest Sharks includes the co-founder of IT Cosmetics Jamie Kern Lima, Raising Cane's founder Todd Graves, venture capitalist, and limited partner of the Atlanta Falcons, Rashaun L. Williams, and returning guest shark Kendra Scott.

No. overall	No. in season	Title	Original release date	Prod. code	U.S. viewers (millions)
340	1	"Episode 1"	October 18, 2024	1601	2.34
Sharks: Mark, Rashaun L. Williams, Kevin, Lori, Daymond
341	2	"Episode 2"	October 25, 2024	1603	2.44
Sharks: Mark, Todd Graves, Kevin, Lori, Daymond
342	3	"Episode 3"	November 1, 2024	1605	2.61
Sharks: Mark, Kendra Scott, Kevin, Lori, Daymond
343	4	"Episode 4"	November 8, 2024	1606	2.92
Sharks: Mark, Daniel, Kevin, Lori, Robert
344	5	"Episode 5"	November 15, 2024	1611	2.69
Sharks: Mark, Barbara, Kevin, Lori, Rashaun L. Williams
345	6	"Episode 6"	November 22, 2024	1604	2.91
Sharks: Mark, Todd Graves, Kevin, Lori, Daymond
346	7	"Episode 7"	December 13, 2024	1610	2.88
Sharks: Mark, Daymond, Kevin, Lori, Robert
347	8	"Episode 8"	January 17, 2025	1608	2.90
Sharks: Mark, Daniel, Kevin, Lori, Robert
348	9	"Episode 9"	January 24, 2025	1612	3.20
Sharks: Mark, Barbara, Kevin, Lori, Jamie Kern Lima
349	10	"Episode 10"	January 31, 2025	1607	3.00
Sharks: Mark, Kendra Scott, Kevin, Lori, Daymond
350	11	"Episode 11"	February 7, 2025	1615	3.23
Sharks: Mark, Barbara, Kevin, Lori, Robert
351	12	"Episode 12"	March 7, 2025	1614	2.96
Sharks: Mark, Barbara, Kevin, Lori, Daniel
352	13	"Episode 13"	March 14, 2025	1613	2.93
Sharks: Mark, Daymond, Kevin, Lori, Robert
353	14	"Episode 14"	March 21, 2025	1602	2.79
Sharks: Mark, Rashaun L. Williams, Kevin, Lori, Daymond
354	15	"Episode 15"	April 4, 2025	1616	2.50
Sharks: Mark, Barbara, Kevin, Lori, Daniel
355	16	"Episode 16"	April 11, 2025	1619	2.73
Sharks: Mark, Barbara, Kevin, Lori, Robert
356	17	"Episode 17"	April 18, 2025	1618	2.92
Sharks: Mark, Barbara, Kevin, Lori, Daymond
357	18	"Episode 18"	May 2, 2025	1609	2.75
Sharks: Mark, Daniel, Kevin, Lori, Robert
358	19	"Episode 19"	May 9, 2025	1617	2.60
Sharks: Mark, Barbara, Kevin, Lori, Robert
359	20	"Episode 20"	May 16, 2025	1620	2.88
Sharks: Mark, Barbara, Kevin, Lori, Daymond; Mark's final episode
