= Shark Tank season 14 =

Shark Tank
- Season 14
- No. of episodes: 22

Release
- Original network: ABC
- Original release: September 23, 2022 – May 19, 2023

Season chronology
- ← Previous; Season 13 Next → Season 15

This is a list of episodes from the fourteenth season of Shark Tank. The season premiered on September 23, 2022 on ABC. It is the first season to have a live audience.

== Episodes ==
Guest sharks this season include Emma Grede, CEO and co-founder of Good American and founding partner of Skims; Gwyneth Paltrow, actress and founder of goop; Peter Jones, dragon on Dragons' Den; Daniel Lubetzky, founder and executive chairman of Kind; Kendra Scott, founder and CEO of Kendra Scott LLC; and Tony Xu, CEO and co-founder of DoorDash.

No. overall	No. in season	Title	Original release date	Prod. code	U.S. viewers (millions)
296	1	"Shark Tank LIVE!"	September 23, 2022	1401	3.79
Sharks: Mark, Daymond, Barbara, Kevin, Lori, Robert
297	2	"Episode 2"	September 30, 2022	1402	3.18
Sharks: Mark, Barbara, Kevin, Lori, Robert
298	3	"Episode 3"	October 7, 2022	1403	3.44
Sharks: Mark, Kendra Scott, Kevin, Lori, Daymond
299	4	"Episode 4"	October 14, 2022	1404	3.44
Sharks: Mark, Daymond, Kevin, Lori, Robert
300	5	"Episode 5"	October 21, 2022	1405	3.34
Sharks: Mark, Emma Grede, Kevin, Lori, Robert
301	6	"Episode 6"	November 11, 2022	1408	3.61
Sharks: Mark, Daymond, Kevin, Lori, Peter Jones
302	7	"Episode 7"	November 18, 2022	1407	3.91
Sharks: Mark, Barbara, Kevin, Lori, Robert
303	8	"Episode 8"	December 2, 2022	1406	3.46
Sharks: Mark, Daymond, Kevin, Lori, Daniel Lubetzky
304	9	"Episode 9"	December 9, 2022	1409	3.65
Sharks: Mark, Barbara, Kevin, Lori, Robert
305	10	"Episode 10"	January 6, 2023	1410	4.01
Sharks: Mark, Barbara, Kevin, Lori, Gwyneth Paltrow
306	11	"Episode 11"	January 13, 2023	1411	4.04
Sharks: Mark, Barbara, Kevin, Lori, Tony Xu
307	12	"Episode 12"	January 20, 2023	1412	3.98
Sharks: Mark, Daymond, Kevin, Lori, Daniel Lubetzky
308	13	"Episode 13"	January 27, 2023	1413	4.22
Sharks: Mark, Daymond, Kevin, Lori, Robert
309	14	"Episode 14"	February 17, 2023	1414	3.91
Sharks: Mark, Emma Grede, Kevin, Lori, Robert
310	15	"Episode 15"	March 3, 2023	1416	3.74
Sharks: Mark, Barbara, Kevin, Lori, Robert
311	16	"Episode 16"	March 10, 2023	1419	3.59
Sharks: Mark, Daymond, Kevin, Lori, Robert
312	17	"Episode 17"	March 17, 2023	1421	3.51
Sharks: Mark, Barbara, Kevin, Lori, Robert
313	18	"Episode 18"	March 31, 2023	1415	3.29
Sharks: Mark, Daymond, Kevin, Lori, Daniel Lubetzky
314	19	"Episode 19"	April 7, 2023	1420	3.76
Sharks: Mark, Barbara, Kevin, Lori, Gwyneth Paltrow
315	20	"Episode 20"	April 14, 2023	1417	3.24
Sharks: Mark, Barbara, Kevin, Lori, Daymond
316	21	"Episode 21"	May 5, 2023	1418	3.21
Sharks: Mark, Barbara, Kevin, Lori, Daymond
317	22	"Episode 22"	May 19, 2023	1422	3.35
Sharks: Mark, Barbara, Kevin, Lori, Daymond
