= Katrina Lake =

American businesswoman (born 1982)

- Born: Katrina Lake; December 24, 1982 (age 43); San Francisco, California, U.S.
- Education: Stanford University; Harvard University (MBA)
- Occupation: Businesswoman
- Title: Founder and chairperson of Stitch Fix
- Spouse: John Clifford (m. 2014)
- Children: 2

Katrina Lake (born December 24, 1982) is an American businesswoman who is the founder and chairperson of Stitch Fix, a fashion-based subscription service. Stitch Fix was established in 2011 in San Francisco and went public in 2017. In 2017, Lake became the youngest woman to take a company public at age 34 and was the only woman in 2017 to lead an initial public offering in technology. She was surpassed by Whitney Wolfe Herd in 2021, who took Bumble Inc. public at age 31.

As of November 2017, Lake held a 16.6% stake in Stitch Fix. In 2017, Forbes named Lake one of America's richest self-made women.

== Early life and education ==
Lake was born on December 24, 1982, in San Francisco. Her mother is a Japanese immigrant who taught in the public school system. Her father is a transplant hepatologist and Professor of Medicine at the University of Minnesota and previously at UCSF. She initially wanted to become a doctor before she became an entrepreneur. She began on the pre-med course but became very interested in economics and business.

Lake was educated at Lowell High School. She received her bachelor's degree from Stanford University in 2005 and earned a Master of Business Administration from Harvard Business School in 2011.

== Career ==
Lake worked at Polyvore and management consultancy The Parthenon Group after graduating from Stanford.

While pursuing her MBA from Harvard, Lake founded Stitch Fix in 2011 at the age of 28. Lake collected SurveyMonkey data from her clients to get a sense of their style. She would use the information to hand select outfits and send them to her customers. At its early stages, Lake did not even have the Internet capabilities to charge her customers and required trust from her clients to pay her monthly. In 2012, Lake was introduced to Netflix VP of data science and engineering Eric Colson, who initially dismissed the business model as "whimsical" but within months joined the company as "chief algorithms officer". She has combined data science with marketing to grow the business.

Customers of Stitch Fix order ‘fixes’ of five items, selected for them by professional stylists, as a one-off or at scheduled intervals, and are subsequently given three days to choose which items they want to keep. In 2016–17, Stitch Fix had $730 million in sales.

Lake was listed as one of Fast Company's 100 Most Creative People in Business and in the 2016 Fortune 40 under 40. Lake was the only woman to take an internet company public in 2017. On the day of the initial public offering, Stitch Fix raised nearly $120 million. In 2018, she was named Disruptor of the Year by Retail Dive.

Lake is a board member at Grubhub and beauty company Glossier.

Lake appeared as a guest shark on Season 11, Episode 14 of the ABC show Shark Tank, which aired on March 6, 2020. Lori Greiner of HSN and Lake teamed up to make a deal with a young budding company for children's glasses, Pair Eyewear.

Lake is a member of YPO.

On April 13, 2021, Lake announced that she was stepping down as CEO of Stitch Fix. Elizabeth Spaulding succeeded her as Stitch Fix president.

In June 2023, Lake became Independent Director of Recruit Holdings Co., Ltd.

== Personal life ==
Lake married John Clifford, an investment professional, in 2014. Lake has two sons.
