= Scrub Daddy =

American cleaning product company

Scrub Daddy Inc.
- Type: Private
- Industry: Cleaning products
- Founded: 2012; 14 years ago
- Founder: Aaron Krause
- Headquarters: 1700 Suckle Highway Pennsauken Township, New Jersey, US
- Products: Sponges
- Number of employees: 273
- Website: scrubdaddy.com

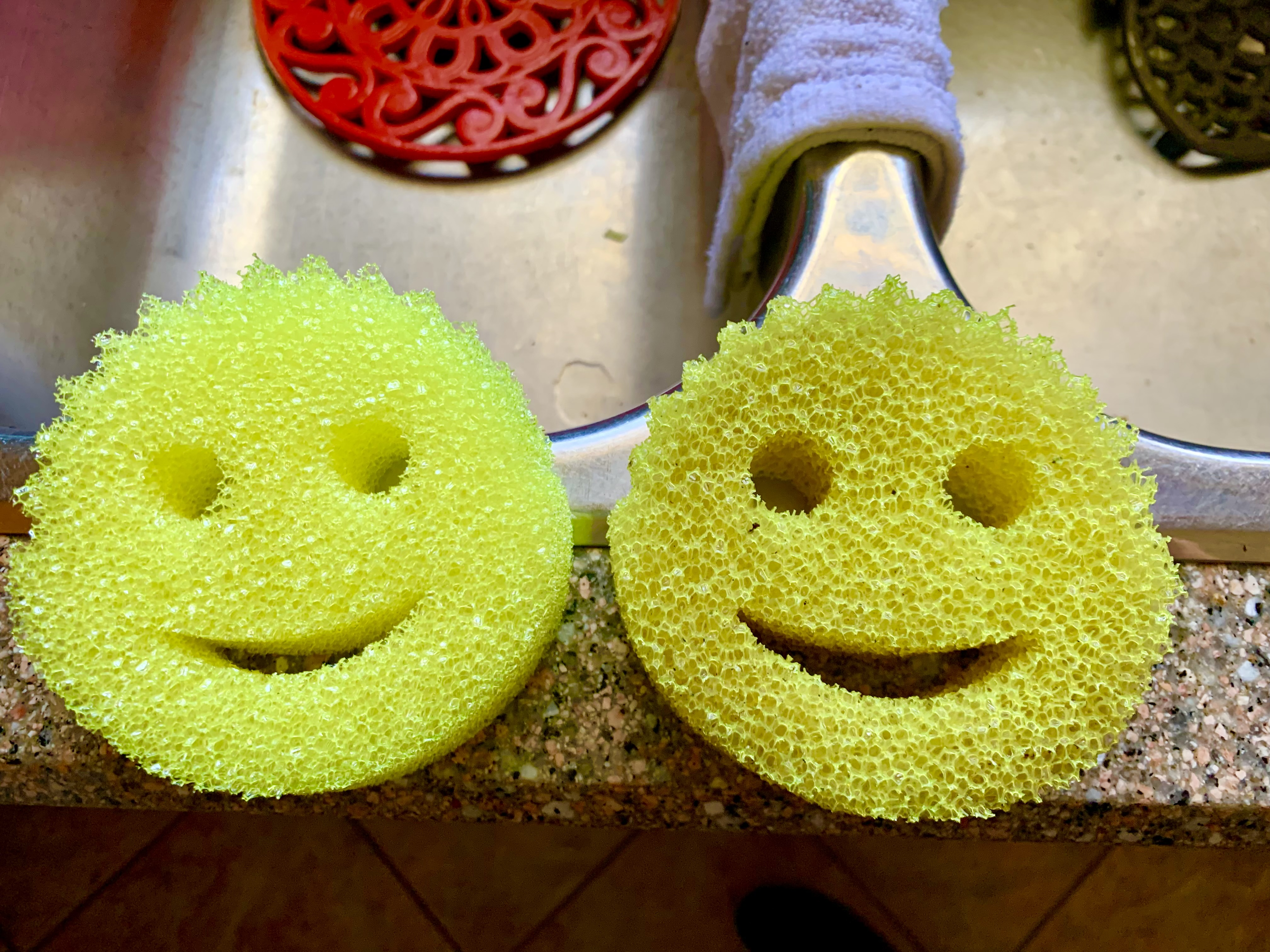
A pair of Scrub Daddy sponges

Scrub Daddy Inc. is an American cleaning product company best known for eponymous sponges it manufactures in the shape of a smiley face. Most products are made of a polymer which changes texture – firm in cold water and soft in warm water.

== History ==
After damaging the exterior of a vehicle when cleaning the outside, detailer Aaron Krause invented a line of buffing and polishing pads. The company was acquired by 3M in August 2008. 3M did not purchase a line of sponges Krause had invented, leaving them to sit in his factory. Five years later, Krause used the remaining sponges to clean his dishes and lawn furniture. According to Krause, this is when he "realized his multi-million dollar idea."

According to the company's website, Scrub Daddy, Inc. was officially founded in 2012 with grassroots marketing. On the Shark Tank episode originally airing in October 2012, Lori Greiner made a 20% equity stake deal with Krause for $200,000. The following day, Greiner and Krause sold 42,000 sponges in under seven minutes on QVC. Greiner then helped Scrub Daddy to be sold in retail stores such as Bed, Bath & Beyond. In January 2017, Scrub Daddy's total revenues surpassed $100 million – the highest of any Shark Tank product. In Season 14 Episode 13, it was reported that Scrub Daddy in 10 years has 273 employees, 160 products, sold in 257,000 retail locations, and is a top 3 grossing company in Shark Tank history, having sold more than $926 million in retail sales as of May 2023.

As of 2024, Scrub Daddy had the third highest revenue of any product successfully pitched on the ABC reality show Shark Tank.

== Products ==
=== Scrub Daddy ===
Scrub Daddy sponges are composed of a proprietary polycaprolactone thermoplastic polyurethane foam marketed as FlexTexture. This specific polymer blend allows the sponge to alter its physical properties based on water temperature, remaining firm in cold water and becoming softer in warm water. The original Scrub Daddy is a yellow circular scrubber with a smiling face punched into it. Krause has two patents on its design.

=== Other products ===
The brand consists of more than 20 products, including scouring pads, dual-sided sponges, sink organizers, soap dispensers and household erasers. It also has a brand called Scrub Mommy, featuring a traditional sponge attached to the typical scrub daddy surface, introduced in 2014.
