= Shark Tank =

American reality television series

- Genre: Reality television
- Created by: Mark Burnett
- Directed by: Craig Spirko; Ken Fuchs; Alan Carter
- Starring: Kevin O'Leary; Mark Cuban; Robert Herjavec; Lori Greiner; Daymond John; Barbara Corcoran; Kevin Harrington; Daniel Lubetzky; Kendra Scott; Rashaun Williams
- Narrated by: Phil Crowley
- Composers: Jeff Lippencott; Mark T. Williams
- Country of origin: United States
- Original language: English
- No. of seasons: 18
- No. of episodes: 384 (list of episodes)

Production
- Executive producers: Mark Burnett (seasons 1–15); Clay Newbill; Phil Gurin; Barry Poznick
- Camera setup: Multi-camera
- Running time: 42 minutes
- Production companies: Mark Burnett Productions (2009–2011); One Three Media (2012–2014); United Artists Media Group (2014–2015); MGM Television (2016–present); Sony Pictures (Note: As Sony Pictures Television from 2009 to 2020 and 2023 to 2026 and Sony Pictures Television Studios from 2020 to 2023.)

Original release
- Network: ABC
- Release: August 9, 2009 – present

Shark Tank (Note: Broadcast in the UK as Dragons' Den US — Shark Tank as of season 14) is an American business reality television series that premiered on August 9, 2009, on ABC. The show is the American franchise of the international format Dragons' Den, a British television series, which itself is a remake of the Japanese television show The Tigers of Money (Japanese: マネーの虎, romanized: manē no tora). It shows entrepreneurs making business presentations to a panel of five angel investors (providers of venture capital to early stage start-ups) called "Sharks" on the program, who decide whether to invest in their companies.

The series has been a ratings success in its time slot, winning the Primetime Emmy Award for Outstanding Structured Reality Program five times (2014–2017 and 2024).

== Premise ==
The show features a panel of investors called "sharks", who decide whether to invest as entrepreneurs make business presentations on their company or product. The sharks often find weaknesses and faults in an entrepreneur's product, business model or valuation of their company. Some of the investors are usually kind-hearted and try to soften the impact of rejection, such as panel member Barbara Corcoran, while others such as Kevin O'Leary can be "brutal" and might show "no patience even for tales of hardship". The sharks are paid as cast stars of the show, but a disclaimer at the start of each episode states the money they invest is their own. The same disclaimer also states that no offer of investment is being made to the viewer. The entrepreneur can make a handshake deal (gentleman's agreement) on the show if a panel member is interested. However, if all of the panel members opt out, the entrepreneur leaves empty-handed.

The show is said to portray "the drama of pitch meetings and the interaction between the entrepreneurs and tycoons". A pitch of around 45 minutes by a contestant is edited to about 11 minutes. As of 2018, approximately 35,000 to 40,000 entrepreneurs apply each season with about 1,000 advancing to the next step, 150 getting to pitch the sharks, and fewer than 100 making it on the air; most episodes contain four pitches per broadcast hour.

=== Post-show ===
Shark cast member Kevin O'Leary believes about 20% of the handshake deals made on the show are never executed due to the investors' due diligence process following the handshake deal, which includes product testing and examining the contestants' business and personal financials. Fellow shark Robert Herjavec believes that about 90% of those withdrawals come from the entrepreneur, in some cases due to only appearing on the program for publicity.

The show is often responsible for what has become known as the Shark Tank effect. Simply appearing on the show, even without getting an offer, has the potential to significantly boost sales for companies. Some entrepreneurs have reported 10- to 20-fold increases in daily revenues after the show's airing.

== Cast ==
=== Sharks ===
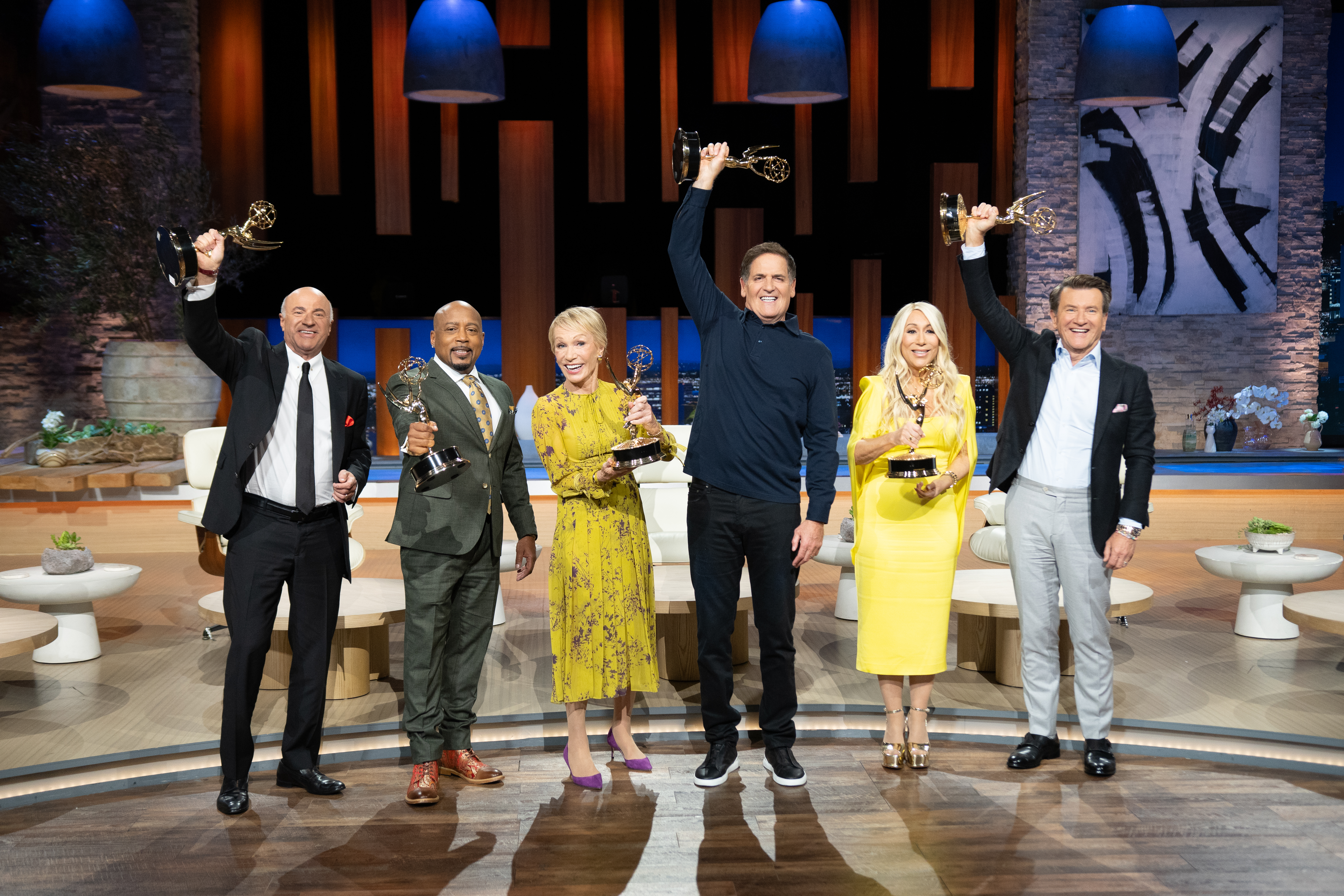
The main cast of Shark Tank from season 4 to season 16 (Kevin O'Leary, Daymond John, Barbara Corcoran, Mark Cuban, Lori Greiner, and Robert Herjavec, pictured left to right)

Two of the show's longstanding sharks, Robert Herjavec and Kevin O'Leary, are Canadian entrepreneurs who had previously appeared on the Canadian version of the series titled Dragons' Den. Since 2023, Herjavec also appears on the Australian version of Shark Tank. American entrepreneurs Daymond John and Barbara Corcoran have been sharks since the first season. Since September 2024, Daniel Lubetzky, founder of the Kind snacks company, has appeared as a permanent shark. Mark Cuban, former principal owner of the Dallas Mavericks, first appeared as a guest during the second season in 2011, and was a permanent shark from the following year until his departure in the final episode of Season 16 that aired in May 2025. In 2026, Kendra Scott and Rashaun Williams were elevated to permanent sharks.

| Sharks | Seasons | | | | | | | | | | | | | | | | | |
| Sharks | 1 | 2 | 3 | 4 | 5 | 6 | 7 | 8 | 9 | 10 | 11 | 12 | 13 | 14 | 15 | 16 | 17 | 18 |
|---|---|---|---|---|---|---|---|---|---|---|---|---|---|---|---|---|---|---|
| Kevin Harrington | Main | | | | | | | | | | | | | | | | | |
| Daymond John | Main | | | | | | | | | | | | | | | | | |
| Barbara Corcoran | Main | | | | | | | | | | | | | | | | | |
| Robert Herjavec | Main | | | | | | | | | | | | | | | | | |
| Kevin O'Leary | Main | | | | | | | | | | | | | | | | | |
| Mark Cuban | | Guest | Main | | | | | | | | | | | | | | | |
| Lori Greiner | | | Guest | Main | | | | | | | | | | | | | | |
| Daniel Lubetzky | | | | | | | | | | | Guest | | | | | Main | | |
| Kendra Scott | | | | | | | | | | | | Guest | | Guest | | Guest | | Main |
| Rashaun Williams | | | | | | | | | | | | | | | | Guest | | Main |
| Jeff Foxworthy | | Guest | | | | | | | | | | | | | | | | |
| John Paul DeJoria | | | | | Guest | | | | | | | | | | | | | |
| Steve Tisch | | | | | Guest | | | | | | | | | | | | | |
| Nick Woodman | | | | | | Guest | | | | | | | | | | | | |
| Troy Carter | | | | | | | Guest | | | | | | | | | | | |
| Ashton Kutcher | | | | | | | Guest | | | | | | | | | | | |
| Chris Sacca | | | | | | | Guest | | | | | | | | | | | |
| Sara Blakely | | | | | | | | | Guest | | | | | | | | | |
| Richard Branson | | | | | | | | | Guest | | | | | | | | | |
| Bethenny Frankel | | | | | | | | | Guest | | | | | | | | | |
| Rohan Oza | | | | | | | | | Guest | | | | | | | | | |
| Alex Rodriguez | | | | | | | | | Guest | | | Guest | | | | | | |
| Charles Barkley | | | | | | | | | | Guest | | | | | | | | |
| Matt Higgins | | | | | | | | | | Guest | | | | | | | | |
| Jamie Siminoff | | | | | | | | | | Guest | | | | | | | | |
| Alli Webb | | | | | | | | | | Guest | | | | | | | | |
| Katrina Lake | | | | | | | | | | | Guest | | | | | | | |
| Maria Sharapova | | | | | | | | | | | Guest | | | | | | | |
| Anne Wojcicki | | | | | | | | | | | Guest | | | | | | | |
| Blake Mycoskie | | | | | | | | | | | | Guest | | | | | | |
| Emma Grede | | | | | | | | | | | | | Guest | | | | | |
| Kevin Hart | | | | | | | | | | | | | Guest | | | | | |
| Peter Jones | | | | | | | | | | | | | Guest | | | | | |
| Nirav Tolia | | | | | | | | | | | | | Guest | | | | | |
| Gwyneth Paltrow | | | | | | | | | | | | | | Guest | | | | |
| Tony Xu | | | | | | | | | | | | | | Guest | | | | |
| Candace Nelson | | | | | | | | | | | | | | | Guest | | | |
| Michael Rubin | | | | | | | | | | | | | | | Guest | | | |
| Jason Blum | | | | | | | | | | | | | | | Guest | | | |
| Todd Graves | | | | | | | | | | | | | | | | Guest | | |
| Jamie Kern Lima | | | | | | | | | | | | | | | | Guest | | |
| Michael Strahan | | | | | | | | | | | | | | | | | Guest | |
| Allison Ellsworth | | | | | | | | | | | | | | | | | Guest | |
| Chip & Joanna Gaines | | | | | | | | | | | | | | | | | Guest | |
| Alexis Ohanian | | | | | | | | | | | | | | | | | Guest | |
| Fawn Weaver | | | | | | | | | | | | | | | | | Guest | |
| Jimmy "MrBeast" Donaldson | | | | | | | | | | | | | | | | | | Guest |
| Jeffrey Housenbold | | | | | | | | | | | | | | | | | | Guest |
| Mindy Kaling | | | | | | | | | | | | | | | | | | Guest |
| J. J. Watt | | | | | | | | | | | | | | | | | | Guest |
| Erin & Sara Foster | | | | | | | | | | | | | | | | | | Guest |
| Steven Bartlett | | | | | | | | | | | | | | | | | | Guest |

=== Notable companies ===
Some notable companies that have appeared on Shark Tank include:

- Bombas
- Breathometer
- Coffee Meets Bagel
- Doorbot, now known as Ring (acquired by Amazon for $1 billion) – first entrepreneur to appear as a (Guest) Shark
- Kodiak Cakes (did not reach a deal)
- Mother Beverage, now known as Poppi (acquired by Pepsi for $1.95 billion) – second and first female entrepreneur to appear as a (Guest) Shark
- Scan (acquired by Snap Inc.)
- Scrub Daddy
- Groove Book (acquired by Shutterfly)
- Talbott Teas (acquired by Jamba Juice)
- Manscaped
- Plated (acquired by Albertsons)
- Mr. Tod's Pies - first product featured on Shark Tank on August 9, 2009

Due to show popularity, companies have falsely advertised that they've appeared on Shark Tank when the air rate is 0.22% (88 aired of 40,000 applicants for 2018 season). A full list of companies that actually appeared on Shark Tank can be found on ABC's website, with cult following websites such as AllSharkTankProducts.com, SharkTankContestant.com, Sharkalytics.com, SharkTankTales.com, and SharkTankSpotlight.com documenting details and products for all companies, and Gazette Review documenting episode recaps and updates on what happened "after Shark Tank".

== Episodes ==
As of October 7, 2026, 384 episodes of Shark Tank have aired, currently in its eighteenth season. Shark Tank's seventeenth season premiered on September 24, 2025.

== Timeline ==
=== Early seasons (2009–2013) ===
Shark Tank premiered in August 2009 and aired 14 episodes through January 2010. In August, it was renewed for a second season.

Season 2 premiered with a "sneak peek" episode on Sunday, March 20, 2011, before resuming its regular Friday night time slot on March 25, 2011. Season 2 had 9 episodes, 5 of them featuring new panel members. Comedian Jeff Foxworthy and Mark Cuban replaced panel member Kevin Harrington in those episodes. In season 2, Kevin O'Leary, Barbara Corcoran, Daymond John, and Robert Herjavec appeared in all nine episodes; Harrington appeared in four, Cuban in three, and Foxworthy in two.

Shark Tank's third season premiered in January 2012. From the third season, Kevin Harrington was replaced by Mark Cuban, while the "queen of QVC" Lori Greiner replaced Barbara Corcoran on 4 episodes. Kevin O'Leary, Daymond John, Robert Herjavec, and Mark Cuban appeared in all 15 episodes of season three. In February, ABC ordered two additional episodes for season 3 using unaired footage, which brought the season's episode total to 15.

On May 10, 2012, Shark Tank was renewed for a fourth season consisting of 26 episodes. This is the first time the series received a full season order. Filming began on June 30, 2012. According to TV Guide, as of December 2012, the show's panel members had invested $12.4 million in the business opportunities presented to them during that season.

In 2013, ABC renewed the show for a fifth season. Season 5 premiered on September 20, 2013. In October 2013, ABC ordered an additional two episodes for the season. In December 2013, ABC ordered another four episodes, bringing the season order to 29 episodes. Steve Tisch and John Paul DeJoria were added as panel members.

=== CNBC syndication (2013–2015) ===
In 2013, CNBC licensed exclusive off-network cable rights for the series from ABC. In May 2014, ABC announced a sixth season starting in September 2014. The series began its syndication run on CNBC on December 30, 2013.

The seventh season of the show premiered on September 25, 2015. Actor/investor Ashton Kutcher, music manager/CEO Troy Carter, and venture investor Chris Sacca all appeared as guest sharks.

=== New set (2017–present) ===
New Shark Tank set since Season 9

The ninth season of the show premiered on October 1, 2017, with guest shark Richard Branson. and a new, modern-looking set, Eames Lounge Chairs, penthouse views of a city, infinity pool, glass staircase to an upstairs lounge, and more space. The tenth season of Shark Tank subtitled "Decade of Dreams" premiered on October 7, 2018. The first episode of the 10th season marked the show's landmark 200th episode.

On February 5, 2019, ABC announced at the TCA press tour that Shark Tank will return for an eleventh season, which premiered on September 29, 2019. On May 21, 2020, ABC renewed the series for a twelfth season, which premiered on October 16, 2020. On May 13, 2021, ABC renewed the series for a thirteenth season, which premiered on October 8, 2021. On May 13, 2022, ABC renewed the series for a fourteenth season, which premiered on September 23, 2022, with a first ever live episode. On May 16, 2023, ABC renewed the series for a fifteenth season, which premiered on September 29, 2023.

On November 27, 2023, Mark Cuban revealed that he would be leaving Shark Tank following the show's sixteenth season. On May 10, 2024, ABC officially renewed the series for a sixteenth season, which premiered on October 18, 2024. During the season, frequent guest shark Daniel Lubetzky was promoted to one of the main sharks. On May 9, 2025, ABC renewed the series for a seventeenth season, which premiered on September 24, 2025.

On May 12, 2026, ABC renewed the series for an eighteenth season, which is expected to premiere in fall 2026. Six days later, it was announced that, starting with season 18, the show will move production from Los Angeles, California to Atlanta, Georgia.

== Production ==
Shark Tank is produced by Mark Burnett and based on the format of the British TV show Dragons' Den, which premiered in 2005 and is itself based on the original Japanese version, Tigers of Money, which began in 2001.

The show initially required each contestant to sign an agreement with Finnmax, the producer of Shark Tank, promising Finnmax the option of taking a "2% royalty" or "5% equity stake" in the contestant's business venture. However, in October 2013, this requirement was repealed by the network, retroactively, due to pressure from panel member Mark Cuban. Cuban felt the requirement would lower the quality of the entrepreneurs, as savvy investors would be wary of trading away a portion of their company just for appearing on the show. A number of potential entrepreneurs had declined to participate in the show for this reason.

=== COVID-19 precautions ===
During the 12th season, the show was moved to Las Vegas, Nevada. Due to the COVID-19 pandemic, the 12th season was produced in a quarantine bubble (which applied to the production staff but not the sharks or entrepreneurs themselves), the set was partially rearranged so the sharks' chairs were at least six feet away from each other, and the sharks would not come up to the entrepreneurs to shake their hands when a deal was made (a wave or "long-distance fist bump" was used instead). In future seasons, the handshakes returned but the chairs have remained separated.

== Spin-offs and specials ==
In 2015, ABC launched a companion series, Beyond the Tank, which shows the current state of companies that appeared on Shark Tank, including both those that made a deal and those that were rejected by investors. Two seasons of Beyond the Tank have aired so far, one in 2015 and one in 2016.

A prime time special titled Shark Tank: Greatest of All Time premiered on February 26, 2020.

A children's version of Shark Tank has been announced as being in early development in June 2023.

== Reception ==
=== Critical reception ===
During its first season, Shark Tank saw a mostly positive reception. Josh Wolk of Entertainment Weekly wrote, "The moneymen ask informed questions and make shrewd decisions, a welcome relief from Donald Trump's capricious calls on Burnett's Celebrity Apprentice". Heather Havrilesky from Salon said that "ABC's Shark Tank is easily the best new reality TV show to air this summer." Tom Shales of The Washington Post wrote, "It sounds gimmicky and visually tedious, with most of the so-called action taking place in a conference room. It's all those things, but the moments of misery make it memorable." Shales noted that the series was premiering during an economic recession, and that many of the aspiring entrepreneurs had poured significant amounts of money into their businesses; he praised "how deftly the show personalizes the desperation and pain experienced by victims of a broken down economy." And David Hinckley of the New York Daily News said, "Once you get past its somewhat misleading title, Mark Burnett's new Shark Tank is a well-paced hour that offers entertainment without humiliation."

=== Ratings ===
During the first two seasons, the series barely peaked at 5 million viewers, with season 2 only having 9 episodes in its run. By season 3, the show's viewership went past 5 million and started to crack the top 100 in the ratings. By 2012, the show averaged over 6 million viewers per episode. It is the most watched program on Friday nights in the 18- to 49-year-old demographic. As a result, ABC added three more episodes to the original season order of 22. In its sixth season, the series reached over 9 million per episode, becoming its most successful season to date.

Viewership and ratings per season of Shark Tank
| Season | Timeslot (ET) | Episodes | First aired | | Last aired | | TV season | Viewership rank | Avg. viewers (millions) | 18–49 rank | Avg. 18–49 rating |
| Season | Timeslot (ET) | Episodes | Date | Viewers (millions) | Date | Viewers (millions) | TV season | Viewership rank | Avg. viewers (millions) | 18–49 rank | Avg. 18–49 rating |
|---|---|---|---|---|---|---|---|---|---|---|---|
| 1 | Sunday 9:00 pm (1–6); Tuesday 8:00 pm (7–10); Friday 9:00 pm (11–14) | 14 | August 9, 2009 | 4.23 | February 5, 2010 | 4.65 | 2009–10 | 102 | 4.81 | 103 | 1.5 |
| 2 | Friday 8:00 pm | 9 | March 20, 2011 | 6.13 | May 13, 2011 | 4.99 | 2010–11 | 113 | 5.12 | 146 | 1.4 |
| 3 | Friday 8:00 pm | 15 | January 20, 2012 | 6.25 | May 18, 2012 | 5.52 | 2011–12 | 98 | 6.03 | 99 | 1.8 |
| 4 | Friday 8:00 pm (1–7, 23); Friday 9:00 pm (8–22, 24–26) | 26 | September 14, 2012 | 6.40 | May 17, 2013 | 6.68 | 2012–13 | 63 | 6.92 | 64 | 2.1 |
| 5 | Friday 9:00 pm | 29 | September 20, 2013 | 6.86 | May 16, 2014 | 6.74 | 2013–14 | 51 | 8.02 | 44 | 2.0 |
| 6 | Friday 9:00 pm | 29 | September 26, 2014 | 7.45 | May 15, 2015 | 7.04 | 2014–15 | 55 | 9.13 | 46 | 2.3 |
| 7 | Friday 9:00 pm | 29 | September 25, 2015 | 6.08 | May 20, 2016 | 5.47 | 2015–16 | 63 | 7.05 | 53 | 1.9 |
| 8 | Friday 9:00 pm | 24 | September 23, 2016 | 4.98 | May 12, 2017 | 4.01 | 2016–17 | 71 | 6.00 | 70 | 1.5 |
| 9 | Sunday 9:00 pm | 24 | October 1, 2017 | 5.12 | February 25, 2018 | 3.15 | 2017–18 | 86 | 5.50 | 62 | 1.5 |
| 10 | Sunday 9:00 pm | 23 | October 7, 2018 | 2.96 | May 12, 2019 | 3.87 | 2018–19 | 108 | 4.31 | 92 | 1.0 |
| 11 | Sunday 9:00 pm (1–12); Friday 8:00 pm (13–24) | 24 | September 29, 2019 | 3.82 | May 15, 2020 | 4.55 | 2019–20 | 70 | 4.95 | 61 | 1.0 |
| 12 | Friday 8:00 pm | 25 | October 16, 2020 | 4.03 | May 21, 2021 | 3.55 | 2020–21 | 61 | 4.97 | 41 | 0.9 |
| 13 | Friday 8:00 pm | 24 | October 8, 2021 | 3.72 | May 20, 2022 | 3.59 | 2021–22 | 53 | 4.53 | 45 | 0.7 |
| 14 | Friday 8:00 pm | 22 | September 23, 2022 | 3.79 | May 19, 2023 | 3.35 | 2022–23 | 53 | 4.30 | 48 | 0.6 |
| 15 | Friday 8:00 pm | 22 | September 29, 2023 | 3.47 | May 3, 2024 | 2.74 | 2023–24 | 57 | 3.85 | 63 | 0.5 |
| 16 | Friday 8:00 pm | 20 | October 18, 2024 | 2.34 | May 16, 2025 | 2.88 | 2024–25 | TBD | TBD | TBD | TBD |
| 17 | Wednesday 10:00 pm | 18 | September 24, 2025 | 1.88 | April 22, 2026 | N/a | 2025–26 | TBD | TBD | TBD | TBD |
| 18 | Wednesday 10:00 pm | TBA | September 30, 2026 | 1.91 | TBA | TBD | 2026–27 | TBD | TBD | TBD | TBD |

=== Awards and nominations ===
| Year | Award | Category | Recipient(s) | Result | Ref. |
|---|---|---|---|---|---|
| 2012 | Critics' Choice Television Awards | Best Reality Series – Competition | Shark Tank | Nominated | |
| 2012 | Producers Guild of America Awards | Best Non-Fiction Television | Shark Tank | Nominated | |
| 2012 | Primetime Creative Arts Emmy Awards | Outstanding Reality Program | Mark Burnett, Clay Newbill, Phil Gurin, Yun Lingner, Brien Meagher, David Eilenberg, Jim Roush, Rhett Bachner, Bill Gaudsmith and Becky Blitz | Nominated | |
| 2013 | Critics' Choice Television Awards | Best Reality Series – Competition | Shark Tank | Nominated | |
| 2013 | NAACP Image Awards | Outstanding Reality Series | Shark Tank | Nominated | |
| 2013 | Producers Guild of America Awards | Best Non-Fiction Television | Shark Tank | Nominated | |
| 2013 | Television Critics Association Awards | Outstanding Achievement in Reality Programming | Shark Tank | Won | |
| 2013 | Primetime Creative Arts Emmy Awards | Outstanding Reality Program | Mark Burnett, Clay Newbill, Phil Gurin, Yun Lingner, Max Swedlow, Jim Roush, Carl Hansen, Bill Gaudsmith, Joni Day and Becky Blitz | Nominated | |
| 2014 | Critics' Choice Television Awards | Best Reality Series – Competition | Shark Tank | Won | |
| 2014 | Television Critics Association Awards | Outstanding Achievement in Reality Programming | Shark Tank | Nominated | |
| 2014 | Producers Guild of America Awards | Best Non-Fiction Television | Becky Blitz, Mark Burnett, Bill Gaudsmith, Phil Gurin, Yun Lingner, Clay Newbill, Jim Roush, Laura Roush, and Max Swedlow | Nominated | |
| 2014 | Primetime Creative Arts Emmy Awards | Outstanding Structured Reality Program | Mark Burnett, Clay Newbill, Philip Gurin, Yun Lingner, Jim Roush, Max Swedlow, Bill Gaudsmith, Becky Blitz, Sami Aziz, Heather Dreiling, Michael Kramer, Laura Skowlund and Kate Ryu | Won | |
| 2014 | Primetime Creative Arts Emmy Awards | Outstanding Directing for Nonfiction Programming | Ken Fuchs (for "Episode #501") | Nominated | |
| 2015 | Critics' Choice Television Awards | Best Reality Series | Shark Tank | Won | |
| 2015 | NAACP Image Awards | Outstanding Reality Program/Reality Competition Series | Shark Tank | Nominated | |
| 2015 | Television Critics Association Awards | Outstanding Achievement in Reality Programming | Shark Tank | Nominated | |
| 2015 | Directors Guild of America Awards | Outstanding Directing – Reality Programs | Ken Fuchs (for "Episode #702") | Nominated | |
| 2015 | Producers Guild of America Awards | Best Non-Fiction Television | Mark Burnett, Clay Newbill, Yun Lingner, Max Swedlow, Jim Roush, Brandon Wallace, Becky Blitz, Laura Roush, Shaun Polakow, Phil Gurin | Nominated | |
| 2015 | Primetime Creative Arts Emmy Awards | Outstanding Structured Reality Program | Mark Burnett, Clay Newbill, Philip Gurin, Yun Lingner, Jim Roush, Max Swedlow, Brandon Wallace, Becky Blitz, Laura Skowlund, Sami Aziz, Heather Dreiling, Michael Kramer, Kate Ryu, Dominique Worden and Ian Sambor | Won | |
| 2015 | Primetime Creative Arts Emmy Awards | Outstanding Picture Editing for a Structured Reality or Competition Program | David R. Finkelstein, Terri Maloney, Eduardo Martinez, Matt McCartie, Matt Stevenson, Andrew Oliver, Nick Staller, Joel Watson (for "Episode 608") | Nominated | |
| 2016 | Critics' Choice Television Awards | Best Structured Reality Show | Shark Tank | Won | |
| 2016 | Directors Guild of America Awards | Outstanding Directing – Reality Programs | Ken Fuchs (for "Episode #801") | Nominated | |
| 2016 | Primetime Creative Arts Emmy Awards | Outstanding Structured Reality Program | Mark Burnett, Clay Newbill, Yun Lingner, Philip Gurin, Max Swedlow, Brandon Wallace, Becky Blitz, Sami Aziz, Heather Dreiling, Kate Ryu and Dominique Worden | Won | |
| 2016 | Primetime Creative Arts Emmy Awards | Outstanding Picture Editing for a Structured Reality or Competition Program | Editing Team (for "Episode 702") | Nominated | |
| 2017 | Critics' Choice Television Awards | Best Structured Reality Show | Shark Tank | Won | |
| 2017 | NAACP Image Awards | Outstanding Reality Program/Reality Competition Series | Shark Tank | Nominated | |
| 2017 | Television Critics Association Awards | Outstanding Achievement in Reality Programming | Shark Tank | Nominated | |
| 2017 | Primetime Creative Arts Emmy Awards | Outstanding Structured Reality Program | Mark Burnett, Clay Newbill, Yun Lingner, Philip Gurin, Max Swedlow, Brandon Wallace, Becky Blitz, Sami Aziz, Heather Dreiling, Michael Kramer, Shaun Polakow, Laura Roush, Kate Ryu and Dominique Worden | Won | |
| 2017 | Primetime Creative Arts Emmy Awards | Outstanding Picture Editing for a Structured Reality or Competition Program | David R. Finkelstein, Ed Martinez, Tom McGah, Andrew Oliver, Nick Staller, Matt Stevenson, Joel Watson (for "Episode 801") | Nominated | |
| 2018 | Critics' Choice Television Awards | Best Structured Reality Series | Shark Tank | Won | |
| 2018 | Primetime Creative Arts Emmy Awards | Outstanding Structured Reality Program | Mark Burnett, Clay Newbill, Yun Lingner, Philip Gurin, Max Swedlow, Brandon Wallace, Becky Blitz, Sami Aziz, Heather Dreiling, Shaun Polakow, Laura Roush, Kate Ryu, Dominique Worden, Alan Kirk and Christina Reynolds | Nominated | |
| 2018 | Primetime Creative Arts Emmy Awards | Outstanding Directing for a Reality Program | Ken Fuchs (for "Episode 903") | Nominated | |
| 2018 | NAACP Image Awards | Outstanding Reality Program/Reality Competition Series | Shark Tank | Nominated | |
| 2019 | Primetime Creative Arts Emmy Awards | Outstanding Structured Reality Program | Mark Burnett, Clay Newbill, Yun Lingner, Max Swedlow, Phil Gurin, Brandon Wallace, Becky Blitz, Laura Roush, Heather Dreiling, Sami Aziz, Shaun Polakow, Alan Kirk, Christina Reynolds, Nicole Edholm and Shawn Aly | Nominated | |
| 2019 | Primetime Creative Arts Emmy Awards | Outstanding Casting for a Reality Program | Mindy Zemrak and Jen Rosen | Nominated | |
| 2019 | Primetime Creative Arts Emmy Awards | Outstanding Directing for a Reality Program | Ken Fuchs (for "Episode 1002") | Nominated | |
| 2020 | NAACP Image Awards | Outstanding Reality Program, Reality Competition Series or Game Show | Shark Tank | Nominated | |
| 2020 | Directors Guild of America Awards | Outstanding Directing – Reality Programs | Ken Fuchs (for "Episode #1211") | Nominated | |
| 2020 | Primetime Creative Arts Emmy Awards | Outstanding Structured Reality Program | Mark Burnett, Clay Newbill, Yun Lingner, Max Swedlow, Phil Gurin, Mark Cuban, Lori Greiner, Kevin O'Leary, Barbara Corcoran, Daymond John, Robert Herjavec, Brandon Wallace, Becky Blitz, Sami Aziz and Heather Dreiling | Nominated | |
| 2020 | Primetime Creative Arts Emmy Awards | Outstanding Host for a Reality or Competition Program | Barbara Corcoran, Mark Cuban, Lori Greiner, Robert Herjavec, Daymond John and Kevin O'Leary | Nominated | |
| 2021 | Primetime Creative Arts Emmy Awards | Outstanding Structured Reality Program | Mark Burnett, Clay Newbill, Yun Lingner, Max Swedlow, Phil Gurin, Mark Cuban, Lori Greiner, Kevin O'Leary, Barbara Corcoran, Daymond John, Robert Herjavec, Brandon Wallace, Becky Blitz, Sami Aziz and Laura Roush | Nominated | |
| 2021 | Primetime Creative Arts Emmy Awards | Outstanding Host for a Reality or Competition Program | Barbara Corcoran, Mark Cuban, Lori Greiner, Robert Herjavec, Daymond John and Kevin O'Leary | Nominated | |
| 2021 | Primetime Creative Arts Emmy Awards | Outstanding Casting for a Reality Program | Mindy Zemrak, Jen Rosen, and Erica Brooks Hochberg | Nominated | |
| 2022 | Primetime Creative Arts Emmy Awards | Outstanding Structured Reality Program | Mark Burnett, Clay Newbill, Yun Lingner, Max Swedlow, Phil Gurin, Mark Cuban, Lori Greiner, Kevin O'Leary, Barbara Corcoran, Daymond John, Robert Herjavec, Brandon Wallace, Becky Blitz, Shaun Polakow, and Shawn Aly | Nominated | |
| 2022 | Primetime Creative Arts Emmy Awards | Outstanding Host for a Reality or Competition Program | Barbara Corcoran, Mark Cuban, Lori Greiner, Robert Herjavec, Daymond John and Kevin O'Leary | Nominated | |
| 2023 | Primetime Creative Arts Emmy Awards | Outstanding Structured Reality Program | Mark Burnett, Clay Newbill, Yun Lingner, Max Swedlow, Phil Gurin, Mark Cuban, Lori Greiner, Kevin O'Leary, Barbara Corcoran, Daymond John, Robert Herjavec, Brandon Wallace, Becky Blitz, Shaun Polakow, and Shawn Aly | Nominated | |
| 2024 | Primetime Creative Arts Emmy Awards | Outstanding Structured Reality Program | Mark Burnett, Clay Newbill, Yun Lingner, Max Swedlow, Phil Gurin, Mark Cuban, Lori Greiner, Kevin O'Leary, Barbara Corcoran, Daymond John, Robert Herjavec, Brandon Wallace, Becky Blitz, Shaun Polakow, and Shawn Aly | Won | |
| 2024 | Primetime Creative Arts Emmy Awards | Outstanding Host for a Reality or Competition Program | Barbara Corcoran, Mark Cuban, Lori Greiner, Robert Herjavec, Daymond John and Kevin O'Leary | Nominated | |
| 2025 | Primetime Creative Arts Emmy Awards | Outstanding Structured Reality Program | Clay Newbill, Yun Lingner, Max Swedlow, Mark Cuban, Lori Greiner, Kevin O'Leary, Barbara Corcoran, Daymond John, Robert Herjavec, Brandon Wallace, Barry Poznick, Becky Blitz, Andrew Kimmel, Shaun Polakow, Shawn Aly, Christina Reynolds and Kelly Fazel | Nominated | |
| 2025 | Primetime Creative Arts Emmy Awards | Outstanding Host for a Reality or Competition Program | Mark Cuban, Lori Greiner, Kevin O'Leary, Barbara Corcoran, Robert Herjavec, Daymond John and Daniel Lubetzky | Nominated | |
| 2026 | Primetime Creative Arts Emmy Awards | Outstanding Structured Reality Program | Clay Newbill, Yun Lingner, Max Swedlow, Lori Greiner, Kevin O'Leary, Barbara Corcoran, Daymond John, Robert Herjavec, Brandon Wallace, Barry Poznick, Becky Blitz and Andrew Kimmel, Shaun Polakow, Shawn Aly, Christina Reynolds, Kelly Fazel, Jeremy Turkin, Marcy Walton and Steve Bae, Krista Homiak, Maggie Morlath and Denise Galvão | Nominated | |

== In popular culture ==
Shark Tank has been a part of several crossovers with other TV shows. Jimmy Kimmel has pitched on Shark Tank (pants for horses) as a comedy skit which aired on his show, Jimmy Kimmel Live! Disney's Phineas and Ferb character, Dr. Heinz Doofenshmirtz, pitched his invention on the 2013 season finale in a cross-over episode. On the Season 6 Episode "The Tank" of Grace and Frankie, Grace and Frankie pitch their Rise Up toilet invention to the Sharks.

Saturday Night Live has parodied Shark Tank with Chris Rock pitching a parodied ISIS asking for support in going after "Western pigs and vile Jews", prompting Daymond John to state that he found the skit "insensitive".

After the success of the original Shark Tank series, several countries have launched their own localized versions under the same name. Examples include Shark Tank India, Shark Tank Bangladesh, Shark Tank Pakistan, Shark Tank Egypt, and Shark Tank Lebanon. These adaptations retain the core concept of the show, where aspiring entrepreneurs pitch their business ideas to a panel of investors in hopes of securing funding.

== See also ==
- American Inventor
- Buy It Now
- The Big Idea
- Fortune: Million Pound Giveaway
- List of Shark Tank investments
- The Profit
- Redemption Inc.
- West Texas Investors Club
- Win in China
