= Manscaped =

Male grooming product company and brand

Manscaped LLC
- Type: Private
- Founded: 2016
- Headquarters: San Diego, California, US
- Key people: Paul Tran (Co-founder and CEO); Steve King (Co-founder and former CEO)
- Products: Male grooming wares
- Website: manscaped.com

Manscaped LLC is a male grooming company based in San Diego, California, United States. It was co-founded in 2016 by Steve King and Paul Tran and produces and distributes male grooming tools and hygiene products under the Manscaped brand.

== History ==
Co-founders Steve King (the original CEO) and Paul Tran (the current CEO) established Manscaped in 2016 to provide male grooming products targeted at pubic hair removal. The company uses the term manscaping, a long-standing neologism, as the basis of its branding, and is referenced in Merriam-Webster's definition of the word. It has also capitalized on the shock factor of addressing male hygiene taboos and using pun-based humor and paid celebrity appearances to build its name.

In October 2018, Manscaped was featured in the 10th series of ABC's "Shark Tank," represented by co-founders Steve King and Josh King, who sought $500,000 in funding for the company and accepted a handshake offer for that amount from Mark Cuban and Lori Greiner in exchange for a 25% stake in the business. However, the deal never materialized after the show, according to Cuban.

In late 2020, the company was reported to be exploring its options for further fundraising. At the time, it was backed by investment firms Kaktus Capital, Longley Capital, Rx3 Venture Partners, and Scala Ventures. A prominent advertisement campaign for the company also aired during the same period, featuring the NFL's Rob Gronkowski and US sportswear supermodel Camille Kostek.

In July 2021, Manscaped was revealed to be in an ongoing merger discussion with Los Angeles-based special-purpose acquisition company Bright Lights to create a combined entity worth up to $1.4 billion. Led by Michael Mahan, the former CEO of Dick Clark Productions, Bright Lights listed for $230 million on the Nasdaq stock market in January 2021 on the promise of finding a merger target in the consumer products or media sectors.

In November 2021, it was confirmed that the merger would advance at a valuation of around $1 billion "amid a difficult market." This followed reporting in October that suggested the company was considering a $500 million sale. Reuters noted that the merger was all but guaranteed after being backstopped by the actor Channing Tatum and two investment firms, Endeavor and Guggenheim Investments. However, the two companies canceled the merger that same year.
