= Kevin Harrington (entrepreneur) =

American businessman, investor and television personality

- Born: October 15, 1956 (age 69); Cincinnati, Ohio, U.S.
- Occupation: Businessman
- Known for: Panel member on Shark Tank
- Website: kevinharrington.tv

Kevin Harrington (born October 15, 1956) is an American businessman who is best known for his appearances on the television series Shark Tank.

== Career ==
In 1985, he created his first infomercial after identifying an opportunity to utilize the late-night and early-morning dead air time on cable networks. While companies like Vitamix had been producing infomercial programs for TV broadcasters since 1949, Harrington's innovation of replacing the traditional off-air time with entertaining and informative advertising pioneered the modern infomercial format. As President of National Media, he personally oversaw the launch of several successful infomercials.

After leaving National Media in 1994, he entered a "joint venture company with The Home Shopping Network" and "co-founded HSN Direct International Inc., where he served as CEO and president from 1994 to 1998. In 2002, he assumed the role of President at Harrington Business Development Inc. and concurrently served as Chairman of On TV, Inc. Additionally, he took on the positions of Vice Chairman and Director at Thane International Inc. in the same year, as well as Director at Reliant International Inc., leaving both roles in 2003.

In 2004, Harrington became the Chairman of Reliant Interactive Media Corp. and the CEO of ResponzeTV America, LLC.

Harrington was the Director of Infusion Brands International, Inc. from 2006 to 2008. In 2007, he became the chief executive officer and ResponzeTV Plc's executive director of ResponzeTV Plc, leaving both positions in 2008. Harrington was one of the original panel members and investors ("Sharks") on the ABC TV series Shark Tank from its inception in 2009. He left in 2011 after two seasons on the show.

== Other works ==
Harrington published his book, Act Now: How I Turn Ideas into Million-Dollar Products in 2009. In 2010, Harrington became a Member of the advisory board at AbsolutelyNew, Inc. and the chairman and Senior Executive Officer of H & H Imports Inc. In 2013, he teamed with Cherif Medawar through efreedom.com, and together, they laid out a plan to equip up-and-coming innovators and business owners with the tools and methods to become Sharks themselves.

He was CEO of the Internet company TVGoods, senior executive officer, and chairman of the board of directors for As Seen On TV, Inc. Harrington has been the Director of Harrington Business Development Inc., since 2002. He is an ex officio of the Electronic Retailing Association (ERA), Founders Circle. Kevin Harrington became the company spokesperson for InventHelp in April 2013.

In 2022, he joined the reality TV show Funding Faceoff, where real estate investors pitched a panel of deal makers for potential funding in a Shark Tank format. The show, consisting of 13 episodes, initially aired on multiple networks, including Roku, Amazon, and Samsung TV, but was later put on hold in 2023.

== Bibliography ==
- Act Now: How I Turn Ideas into Million-Dollar Products (HCI, 2009)
- Key Person of Influence: The Five-Step Method to Become One of the Most Highly Valued and Highly Paid People in Your Industry (Rethink Press Limited, 2015)
- Put a Shark in Your Tank: Actionable Steps to Business Success (CreateSpace Independent Publishing Platform, 2017)
- The Secrets of Closing the Sale Masterclass inspired by the teaching of Zig Ziglar.
