= Shark Tank season 15 =

Shark Tank
- Season 15
- No. of episodes: 22

Release
- Original network: ABC
- Original release: September 29, 2023 – May 3, 2024

Season chronology
- ← Previous; Season 14 Next → Season 16

This is a list of episodes from the fifteenth season of Shark Tank. The season premiered on September 29, 2023, on ABC. The season concluded on May 3, 2024, and contained 22 episodes.

== Episodes ==
In addition to Grede and Lubetzky returning, scheduled guest Sharks for season 15 include Fanatics CEO Michael Rubin, Sprinkles Cupcakes founder Candace Nelson, and film producer Jason Blum.

No. overall	No. in season	Title	Original release date	Prod. code	U.S. viewers (millions)
318	1	"Episode 1"	September 29, 2023	1501	3.47
Sharks: Mark, Candace Nelson, Kevin, Lori, Daymond "Gatsby" chocolate; "Pie Wine" pizza wine; "See Worthy" eye patches (NO); "Gently Soap"
319	2	"Episode 2"	October 6, 2023	1503	3.60
Sharks: Mark, Daymond, Kevin, Lori, Daniel Lubetzky "StormBag" sandbags; "Return Home" funeral process (NO); "Matador Meggings" modesty leggings for men (NO); "Toast-It" arepas (YES).
320	3	"Episode 3"	October 13, 2023	1502	3.33
Sharks: Mark, Barbara, Kevin, Lori, Michael Rubin "Bot-It" online purchasing bot service (YES); "Wellingtons" frozen beef wellingtons (NO); "Glove Wrap" elastic band for baseball gloves (YES); "Dating by Blaine" dating courses and coaching (YES).
321	4	"Episode 4"	October 20, 2023	1505	2.93
Sharks: Mark, Barbara, Kevin, Lori, Robert "Paddlesmash" outdoor pickleball game (YES); "FairyTale Pet Care" wedding day pet handling (NO); "Monosuit" recycled women's apparel (NO); "Buena Papa" Latin-inspired French fry restaurant (YES).
322	5	"Episode 5"	October 27, 2023	1506	2.94
Sharks: Mark, Barbara, Kevin, Lori, Jason Blum
323	6	"Episode 6"	November 3, 2023	1507	3.47
Sharks: Mark, Daymond, Kevin, Lori, Robert
324	7	"Episode 7"	November 17, 2023	1504	3.36
Sharks: Mark, Barbara, Kevin, Lori, Daymond
325	8	"Episode 8"	December 8, 2023	1510	3.28
Sharks: Mark, Barbara, Kevin, Lori, Daymond
326	9	"Episode 9"	December 15, 2023	1509	3.27
Sharks: Mark, Emma Grede, Kevin, Lori, Robert
327	10	"Episode 10"	January 12, 2024	1511	3.62
Sharks: Mark, Candace Nelson, Kevin, Lori, Daymond
328	11	"Episode 11"	January 19, 2024	1514	3.88
Sharks: Mark, Barbara, Kevin, Lori, Robert
329	12	"Episode 12"	January 26, 2024	1508	3.83
Sharks: Mark, Daymond, Kevin, Lori, Daniel Lubetzky
330	13	"Episode 13"	February 2, 2024	1513	3.45
Sharks: Mark, Emma Grede, Kevin, Lori, Robert
331	14	"Episode 14"	February 16, 2024	1512	3.20
Sharks: Mark, Barbara, Kevin, Lori, Robert
332	15	"Episode 15"	February 23, 2024	1516	3.52
Sharks: Mark, Daymond, Kevin, Lori, Robert
333	16	"Episode 16"	March 1, 2024	1517	3.12
Sharks: Mark, Daymond, Kevin, Lori, Daniel Lubetzky
334	17	"Episode 17"	March 8, 2024	1515	3.13
Sharks: Mark, Barbara, Kevin, Lori, Robert
335	18	"Episode 18"	March 15, 2024	1518	3.02
Sharks: Mark, Barbara, Kevin, Lori, Jason Blum "The Murder Mystery Company" immersive dinner theater; "Overplay" social media meets gaming; "Nourish and Bloom" black-owned AI grocery store; "Nowhere Bakery" allergy free treats
336	19	"Episode 19"	April 5, 2024	1519	3.01
Sharks: Mark, Emma Grede, Kevin, Lori, Robert
337	20	"Episode 20"	April 12, 2024	1520	2.96
Sharks: Mark, Barbara, Kevin, Lori, Robert
338	21	"Episode 21"	April 19, 2024	1521	3.02
Sharks: Mark, Barbara, Kevin, Lori, Michael Rubin
339	22	"Episode 22"	May 3, 2024	1522	2.74
Sharks: Mark, Candace Nelson, Kevin, Lori, Daymond; Mosh protein bars supporting brain health (YES), Sip Herbals herbal teas (NO), Arber organic plant care (NO), Flaus electric flossing device (YES) Note: The entrepreneurs for Mosh were journalist and Kennedy family member Maria Shriver and her son Patrick Schwarzenegger.
