= Kind Movement =

The Kind Movement (sometimes stylized as KIND Movement) is a cause-marketing campaign launched by Kind LLC, a New-York-based snack-food manufacturer.

== History ==
Introduced in 2008, the Kind Movement was announced by Kind LLC's marketing director with the purpose of "[furthering] our mission to make the world a little kinder by inspiring kind acts." The Kind Movement is said to have "inspired thousands of unexpected acts of kindness around the world".

=== Kinded ===
The Kinded involved created and distributed uniquely coded cards that were to serve as 'licenses' to do kind acts. The hope was that this would start a chain of kind acts that could be publicly tracked by their unique code on an interactive online platform.

=== Do the KIND Thing ===
In March 2010, the company furthered its efforts to inspire unexpected acts of kindness with Do the KIND Thing, a platform that empowered people to turn kind acts into support for causes. During the platform's three-month duration, Do The KIND Thing inspired more than 40,000 acts of kindness in support of nearly 150 causes. At the culmination, KIND awarded funds to the three causes that inspired the greatest number of KIND acts: Operation Gratitude Good Girls Give and Suffolk County JCC.

In March 2011, KIND unveiled a new iteration of Do the KIND Thing where people could transform their small acts of kindness into big KIND Acts that give back to the world.

On the first Tuesday of each month, KIND challenges its community to carry out a specific KINDING Mission (KIND Tuesday). If enough people sign up to complete that month's KINDING Mission, KIND carries out a BIG KIND Act for a group of people that really needs it.

=== #Kindawesome Card ===
The #kindawesome card is a method noted on the Kind bar website. When someone does something nice, a #kindawesome card can be sent to them that can be redeemed for a free kind bar. The recipient gets another card to pass on to someone else and continue the kind gesture.

=== Kind Food Truck ===
In April 2011, Kind introduced the Kind Food Truck to recruit people for the movement and to distribute samples of Kind products.

=== Kind Charitable Support ===
In 2010, Kind granted more than $100,000 in product and monetary donations to causes that inspired kindness—including organizations such as Surfrider Foundation, Common Threads, Autism Speaks, Extreme Makeover Home Edition and the Great Kindness Challenges.

== Reception ==
The Kinded campaign received mixed press coverage, with NBC Connecticut asking, "Clever and optimistic or jaded marketing ploy?" It was recognized by Time as a "new way to make a difference" and by Ladies' Home Journalas a way to "snack and give back."

== See also ==
- List of food trucks
