= Kendra Scott =

American fashion designer and businesswoman

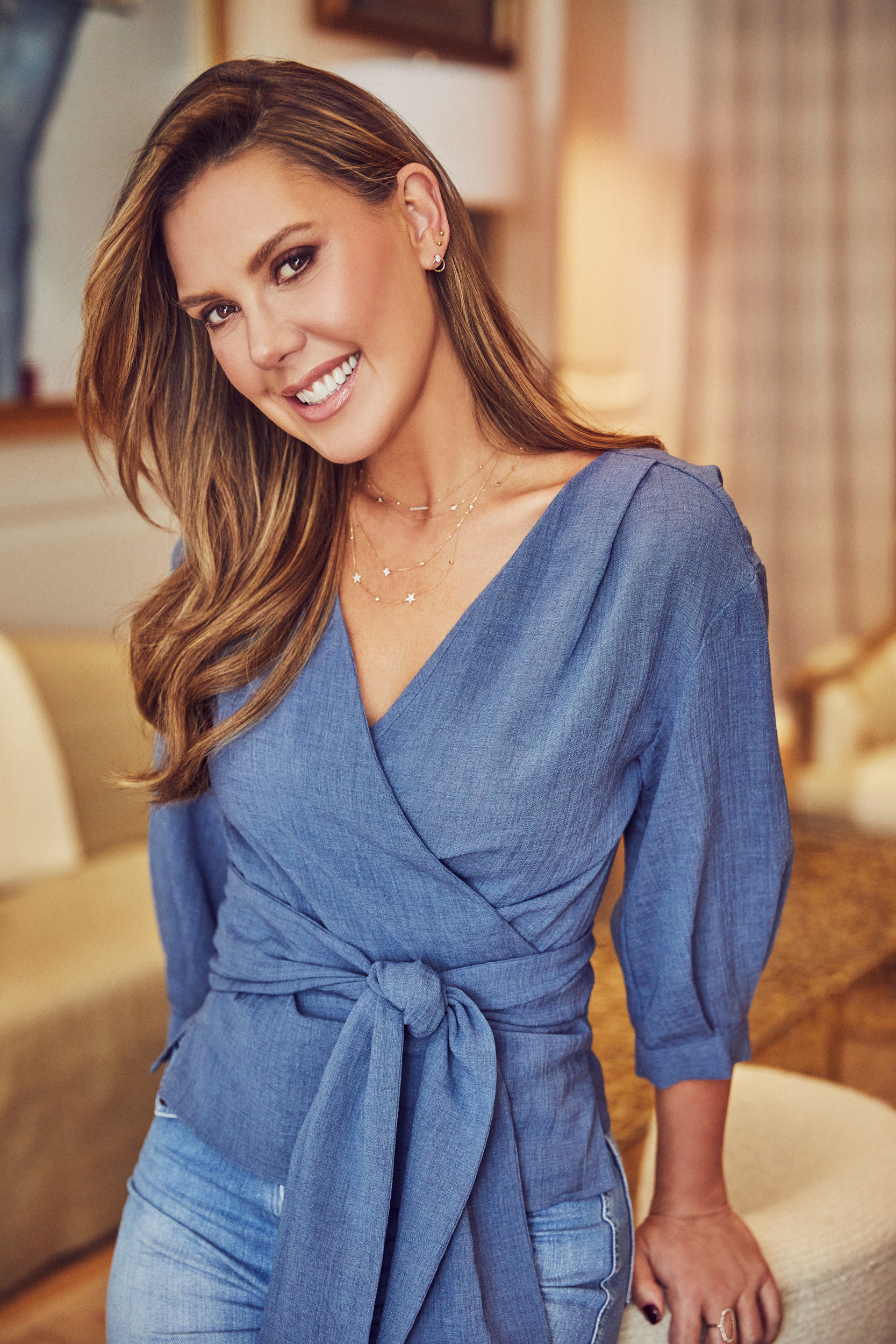
- Scott in 2020
- Born: Kendra Baumgartner; March 27, 1974 (age 52); Kenosha, Wisconsin, U.S
- Occupation: Fashion designer
- Years active: 2002–present
- Known for: Executive chairwoman, fashion designer at Kendra Scott, LLC
- Spouse: John Scott (m. 2000; div. 2006) Matt Davis (m. 2014; div. 2020) Thomas Evans (m. 2022; div. 2024) Zac Brown (m. 2026)
- Children: 3

Kendra Scott (née Baumgartner; born March 27, 1974) is an American fashion designer. She is the executive chairwoman, designer, and former chief executive officer of Kendra Scott, LLC.

== Early life and career ==
Kendra Scott was born in Kenosha, Wisconsin. At age 16, her family moved to Houston, Texas, where she graduated from Klein High School. Scott fell in love and "followed a boy" to Texas A&M University, which she attended for one year before dropping out to move to Austin, Texas, at age 19 to help with her ill stepfather.

Scott opened her first business, the Hat Box, which specializes in comfortable hats for women undergoing chemotherapy. Scott sold "comfortable but stylish" pieces and donated a portion of the proceeds to cancer research.

Before starting her own business, Scott started making jewelry from home in Austin, Texas.

=== Kendra Scott, LLC ===
Scott founded Kendra Scott LLC in 2002, designing her first collection with $500 in the spare bedroom of her home just after her oldest son was born. She walked from store to store around Austin, selling to local boutiques, and at the last boutique, she had to sell all of her samples to purchase enough materials to cover the orders she had made that first day.

In 2005, Scott's designs were chosen to accessorize Oscar de la Renta's spring 2006 runway show. Scott's designs also appeared in Randolph Duke's 2007 runway show.

Due to the 2008 financial crisis, she nearly had to close her company, but she received an order from Nordstrom for some of their stores; this gave her exposure and allowed her to expand her business.

Scott's first retail store opened on Austin's South Congress Avenue in 2010. In the same year, she began her e-commerce business and launched the brand's Color Bar experience.

In 2011 she opened her second store on Rodeo Drive in Beverly Hills, but she had to close it after a while. In 2014, Scott opened stores around the South and Midwest while ignoring the fashion elite in New York and Los Angeles. Later, in 2016, she sold a minority stake in her company to the private equity firm Berkshire Partners at a valuation of $1 billion.

Valued at over $1 billion, her brand encompasses fashion jewelry, fine jewelry, home accessories, nail lacquer, and beauty products.

At the end of 2019, Scott had 102 retail stores. In addition to an e-commerce business, Scott's merchandise is sold in London's Selfridges, Nordstrom, Neiman Marcus, Von Maur, Bloomingdale's, and over 1,000 specialty boutiques worldwide. 95 percent of her more than 2,000 staff are women. In February 2021, Scott stepped down as CEO, retaining the Executive Chairwoman title, and named Tom Nolan as Kendra Scott's CEO. In January 2026, Chris Blakeslee was appointed CEO of Kendra Scott Design Inc.

Scott invests in companies in Austin, Texas, such as Helm Boots, Darbie Angell dinnerware, and Tiff's Treats.

=== Philanthropy ===
Scott is a philanthropist with a history of supporting women's and children's causes. In 2015, Scott launched the Kendra Cares Program, which brings the company's customizable Color Bar jewelry experience to pediatric hospitals across the country. In 2017, Scott's company hosted more than 10,000 Kendra Gives Back events across its stores. She gave the money to local causes and also donated more than 75,000 pieces of jewelry.

In 2019, Scott donated $1 million to The University of Texas to launch the Kendra Scott Women's Entrepreneurial Leadership Institute. Since 2010 her company's program has given away $30 million.

=== Shark Tank ===
Scott has appeared as a "guest shark" investor on season 12, season 14, and season 16 of the reality television series Shark Tank.

== Recognition ==
Scott was awarded the EY Entrepreneur of the Year 2017 National Award and the Breakthrough Award from the Accessories Council Excellence Awards. She is listed as #40 in Forbes' list of America's Richest Self-Made Women 2019, been named Outstanding Mother of the Year by the Mother's Day Council, Texas Businesswoman of the Year by the Women's Chamber of Commerce, Top 100 Entrepreneurs of the Year by Upstart Business Journal and 2017 CEO of the Year by the Austin Business Journal. In 2017 she was named the Ernst & Young's National Entrepreneur of the Year. She is a member of the Council of Fashion Designers of America.

In 2019, she became the 12th woman in the state to be inducted into the Texas Business Hall of Fame. In April 2020, Governor Greg Abbott named Scott to the Strike Force to Open Texas – a group "tasked with finding safe and effective ways to slowly reopen the state" amid the COVID-19 pandemic. In 2026, Scott was named a CNBC Changemaker, recognized for expanding her brand into new lifestyle categories and for philanthropic efforts that have raised more than $70 million since 2010.

== Personal life ==
Kendra Baumgartner married John Scott in 2000. They had two sons before divorcing in 2006. Scott married Matt Davis on June 6, 2014, in Sedona, Arizona. They have one son together. They divorced in September 2020. She married her third husband, Thomas Evans, in early 2022. They later separated in 2025. In July 2025, Scott announced her engagement to country singer Zac Brown. They were married on May 25, 2026 in a ceremony in Greece.

== Publications ==
- Scott, Kendra (2022). Born to Shine: Do Good, Find Your Joy, and Build a Life You Love (First ed.). New York: Worthy Publications. ISBN 978-1546002321.
