= Rohan Oza =

Zambian-American businessman (born 1971)

- Born: October 2, 1971 (age 55); Livingstone, Zambia
- Education: University of Nottingham; University of Michigan
- Occupations: Former Chief Marketing Officer of Still Brands at The Coca-Cola Company; Founder at Idea Merchants Capital; Investor

Rohan Oza (born October 2, 1971) is an American businessman and investor. He is known for his work with several major consumer brands, including Vita Coco, Bai Brands, and Vitaminwater. Oza appeared as a recurring guest on the reality TV show Shark Tank.

== Early life ==
Oza was born in Zambia in an ethnic-Gujarati family. He studied at Harrow School. Oza went on to study manufacturing and industrial engineering at Nottingham University. He pivoted to marketing and corporate strategy while at the University of Michigan, where he received his MBA.

== Career ==
Oza began his career in the town of Slough as the manufacturing manager behind Mars' M&M's.

Oza got his start in marketing by advertising Snickers for Mars, Incorporated in Europe. He later was hired as a marketing manager for The Coca-Cola Company.

He has been credited for revitalizing the Sprite brand by signing Kobe Bryant as a spokesperson. Oza also worked with Andy Roddick, Michael Vick, Tom Brady, LeBron James, Jennifer Aniston, Gal Gadot, 50 Cent, Ne-Yo, Rihanna, and Madonna as celebrity endorsements.

He left Coca-Cola in 2002 to join Glacéau, most famous for their Vitaminwater brand. In 2007, Coca-Cola purchased Glacéau in an acquisition for $4.2 billion, expanding the company's non-carbonated portfolio. Rohan was appointed Chief Marketing Officer of Coke's still brands, where he stayed until 2009.

As an investor, Oza made an early bet alongside Justin Timberlake on Bai Brands and helped persuade the Dr Pepper Snapple Group to buy the company for $1.7 billion. Additionally, he has backed Smartwater, Bulletproof Coffee and Health-Ade Kombucha.

Oza has also been a recurring guest “shark” for ABC’s Shark Tank. On Shark Tank, Oza invested $400,000 in what was then known as Mother Beverage, later rebranded Poppi soda, for a 25% equity investment. On March 17, 2025, PepsiCo announced acquisition of Poppi, a prebiotic soda brand created in Austin, TX for $1.95 billion.

He serves as an advisor to Impact Network, a non-profit organization bringing quality education to rural Zambians.
