= Helm Boots =

American footwear company

- Industry: Boot manufacturer
- Founder: Joshua Bingaman
- Headquarters: Austin, Texas, United States
- Products: boots and boot care
- Website: http://helmboots.com/

Helm Boots is a brand of boots in the U.S. The company was founded in 2009 by Joshua Bingaman, an Oklahoma native. The company's boots were manufactured in Turkey before production was relocated to Maine. The boots are designed in Austin and then manufactured in Maine using leather materials from American companies like Horween Leather Company and S. B. Foot Tanning Company.

== Boot styles ==
Some of the Helm Boots styles include: Sam: a dress boot with a waxed-canvas panel Muller: a simply designed boot with a cap toe and infused rubber dot tread on the leather sole Philips Cooper: a desert boot Dash: this combines a leather with a monochromatic suede panel and a white boat shoe sole.

== Other businesses ==
Bingaman had opened two coffee shops and a coffee roastery in the Austin, Texas area. He studied how Turkish footwear was made on a trip to visit his aunt.
