= Jamie Kern Lima =

American entrepreneur and former journalist

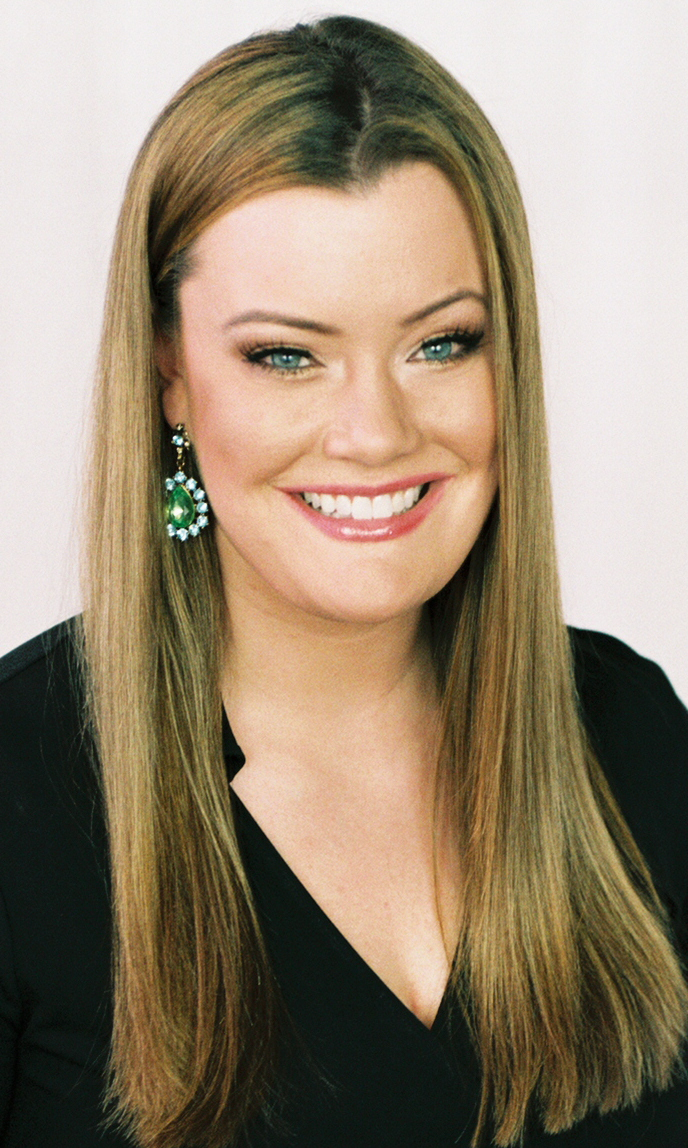
- Born: Jamie Marie Kern; July 16, 1977 (age 49); Seattle, Washington, USA
- Education: Washington State University, Columbia Business School
- Occupations: Entrepreneur; news anchor; beauty queen
- Years active: 1999–present
- Known for: Co-founder of IT Cosmetics
- Television: KNDU; Big Brother; Baywatch
- Height: 5 ft 6 in (1.68 m)
- Spouse: Paulo Lima
- Children: 3
- Awards: Miss Washington USA 2000

Jamie Kern Lima (née Jamie Marie Kern) is an American entrepreneur and former beauty queen and news anchor. She co-founded IT Cosmetics, which she sold to L'Oréal for $1.2 billion, in 2016, becoming the first female chief executive officer of a L'Oréal brand. Kern Lima has been included on the Forbes's list of "America's Richest Self-Made Women" since 2017.

== Early life ==
Kern Lima was born in Seattle, Washington, and grew up in the city and also San Rafael, California. She was the first member of her family to attend college and went to Washington State University, where she graduated valedictorian. She received her Master of Business Administration from Columbia Business School, in 2004. During college, she was a waitress at Denny's and bagged groceries at Safeway. She learned, in her 20s, that she was adopted.

== Early career ==
Kern Lima won the Baywatch College Search, in 1999, and appeared on an episode of the television series. She won the title of Miss Washington USA, in late 1999, and she competed in the Miss USA 2000 pageant, which was held in Branson, Missouri. After considering a career in finance, she applied, on a dare, to be a contestant in the first season of the reality television series Big Brother in 2000. Kern Lima was the last female houseguest on that season.

She became a morning news anchor at KNDU in Tri-Cities, Washington. She also worked as a reporter and anchor for KNDU in Kennewick. In 2006, she moved to Portland, Oregon to become a news anchor and reporter for KPTV.

== Cosmetics career ==
In 2008, Kern Lima co-founded IT Cosmetics after having difficulties with makeup due to rosacea and hyperpigmentation. The business struggled as retailers rejected her products. Kern Lima was featured on a 10-minute QVC segment in which she wiped her makeup off to illustrate the benefit of IT Cosmetics concealers. All of her featured products sold out by the end of the segment.

Kern Lima appeared in more than 1,000 live QVC shows and IT Cosmetics became the largest beauty brand on QVC's network. By 2015, the company had more than $182 million in net sales. Kern Lima remained with IT Cosmetics on its acquisition by L'Oréal in 2016 until August 2019.

== Personal life ==
Kern Lima resides in Los Angeles, California. She is married to Paulo Lima and has three children.

== Publications ==
- Believe IT: How to Go from Underestimated to Unstoppable. Gallery Books. March 25, 2021. ISBN 978-1-9821-5780-7.
- Worthy: How to Believe You Are Enough and Transform Your Life. Hay House Inc. February 20, 2024. ISBN 978-1-4019-7760-3.
