= Poppi (drink) =

American prebiotic soda brand

- Logo used since 2019

- A can of Poppi Strawberry Lemon
- Type: Prebiotic soda
- Manufacturer: PepsiCo
- Distributor: PepsiCo
- Origin: United States, Austin, Texas, U.S.
- Introduced: 2018; 8 years ago
- Website: drinkpoppi.com

Poppi (stylized in all-lowercase as poppi) is an American brand of prebiotic soda known for its "gut healthy" approach to the carbonated-beverage market. Launched in 2018, Poppi offers a variety of low-sugar flavors, each with 35 calories or less. As of 2023, the company's sales have surpassed $100 million with the sodas being available in over 120 retailers. In 2025, PepsiCo announced that they would acquire the pop brand. The acquisition was completed on May 19, 2025.

== History ==
=== Background ===
Poppi was initially founded as Mother Beverage by couple Allison and Stephen Ellsworth. The pair appeared on Shark Tank under the name Mother Beverage in 2018. The name 'Mother Beverage' was a nod to the raw, unfiltered apple cider vinegar used in the soda. Allison had previously worked in the oil and gas industry and initially sold apple cider vinegar-based health drinks at local farmer's markets. After they were married, she and her husband decided to start Mother Beverage in their hometown of Houston, Texas. The company received a $400,000 investment on Shark Tank from Rohan Oza, which was used to rebrand Mother Beverage. In 2020, they renamed the soda "Poppi" to attract a more youthful and modern audience for their brand.

The company raised a $13.5 million series A funding round in 2021 and a $25 million Series B round in 2022.

In 2023, Poppi launched its Soda's Back ad campaign, which boosted brand visibility and in-store sales at over 120 stores, causing their revenue to surpass $100 million as of 2023. As of 2024, the brand has had partnerships with celebrities such as Hailey Bieber, Kylie Jenner, Billie Eilish, Charli xcx, Russell Westbrook, Jennifer Lopez, Olivia Munn, & Lucas Cruikshank.

In 2024, the company began to distribute some of their products in Canada.

=== Lawsuit ===
In 2024, a class-action lawsuit in California was filed against Poppi. The suit alleged that the company misled consumers with false claims about the soda's gut benefits that were not backed by scientific evidence. Though the soda does contain inulin, a naturally soluble fiber, the plaintiffs claimed that the 2 grams of fiber within the drink are too low to create a meaningful effect for gut health. This lawsuit claims that the company violates California law with false and misleading advertising. In July 2025, the company agreed to settle the suit for $8.9 million. A final hearing for the lawsuit was scheduled for November 20, 2025.

=== Acquisition by PepsiCo ===
In March 2025, PepsiCo announced it would acquire Poppi for $1.95 billion. The deal was completed on May 19, 2025.

In 2026, Poppi was launched in the United Kingdom and Ireland by PepsiCo's British bottler Carlsberg Britvic, it began being sold in Tesco and Pret a Manger. Unlike the US version, it is not marketed as a prebiotic soda due to not having enough fibre.

== Marketing ==
Poppi Soda's brand advertising includes music and sports as brand pillars. In 2023, Poppi Soda featured music by electronic pop artist Jane & The Boy in a TV Spot. In 2024, Poppi announced a brand partnership with American rapper and singer Post Malone, in the wake of his public announcement that he would cut traditional soda from his diet, as well as a sponsorship with the Los Angeles Lakers. In 2025, Poppi Soda ran a second consecutive Super Bowl ad featuring Jake Shane and Alix Earle. In 2026, an ad starring Charli XCX and Rachel Sennott premiered during the Super Bowl.

The Gut Health Market

Poppi is widely recognised as a prebiotic Soda. This prebiotic market alone is suggested to grow from 12.7 USD billion in 2026 to 32.9 USD billion by 2033. The predicted growth of this market in the next 7 years is greatly suggestive of the expansion of the gut health market and consumer demand for health related drinks.

The soda as previously stated, contains between 2 and 3 grams of fibre by the means of agave Inulin. By ingredient in 2025, the Inulin segment of the prebiotic market upheld the largest market share of 29.6%.

== Flavors ==
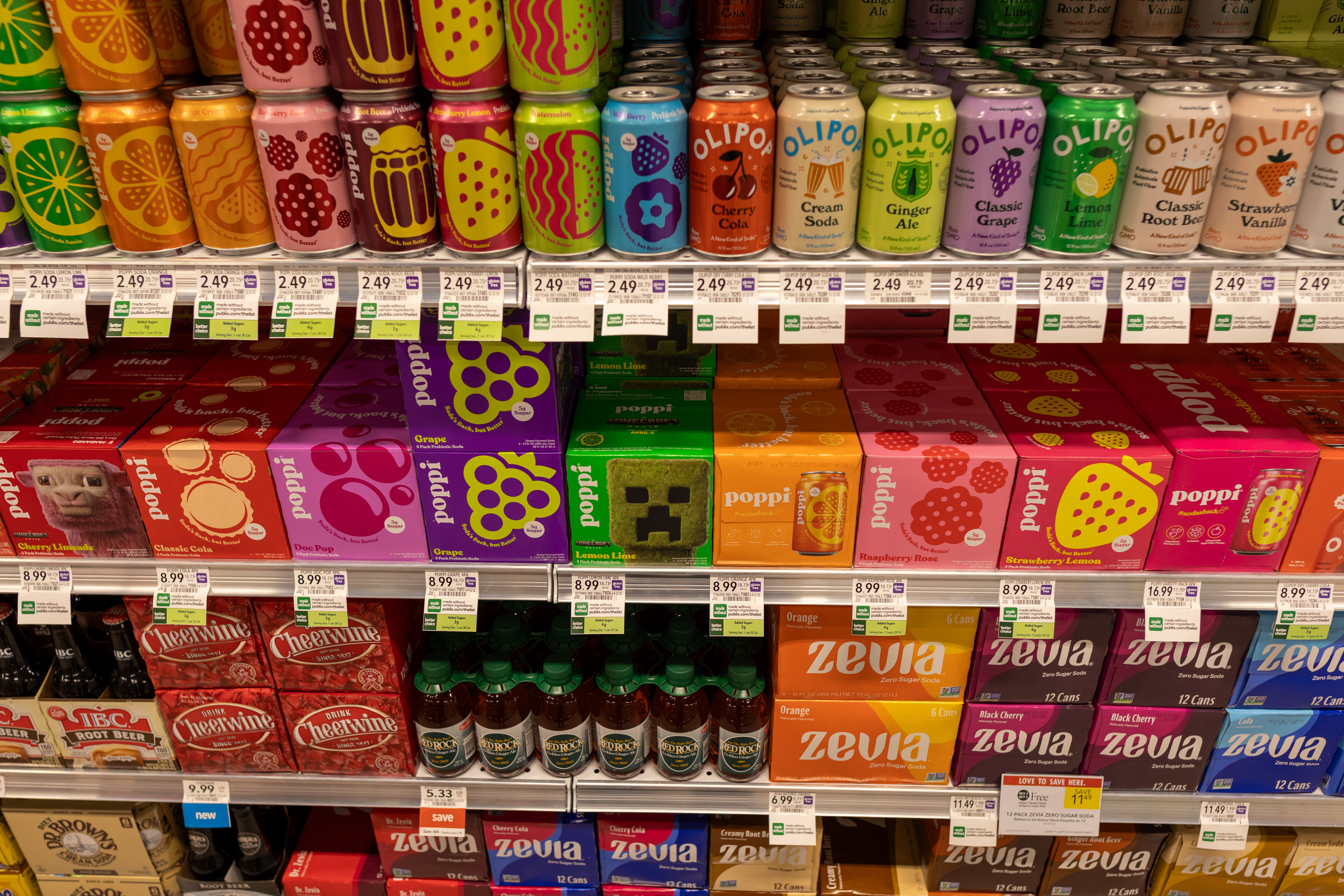
Poppi soda sold alongside other brands at a Publix supermarket in Orlando, Florida

Poppi offers a variety of low-sugar flavors, each with 35 calories or less. Available flavors include:

- Classic Cola
- Root Beer
- Watermelon
- Cherry Limeade
- Grape
- Raspberry Rose
- Ginger Lime
- Lemon Lime
- Wild Berry
- Orange Cream
- Cherry Cola
- Strawberry Lemon
- Orange
- Doc Pop
- Shirley Temple
- Cream Soda
- Alpine Blast
- Cranberry Fizz (seasonal)
- Punch Pop (seasonal)
- Berries & Cream

In June 2025, Poppi announced that they had reformulated their Root Beer flavour following complaints regarding the drink's weaker taste.

== See also ==
- Olipop - a competing brand of prebiotic soda
- Slice - a competing brand of prebiotic soda (originally owned by Poppi owner PepsiCo)
