= Lori Greiner =

American TV personality and entrepreneur

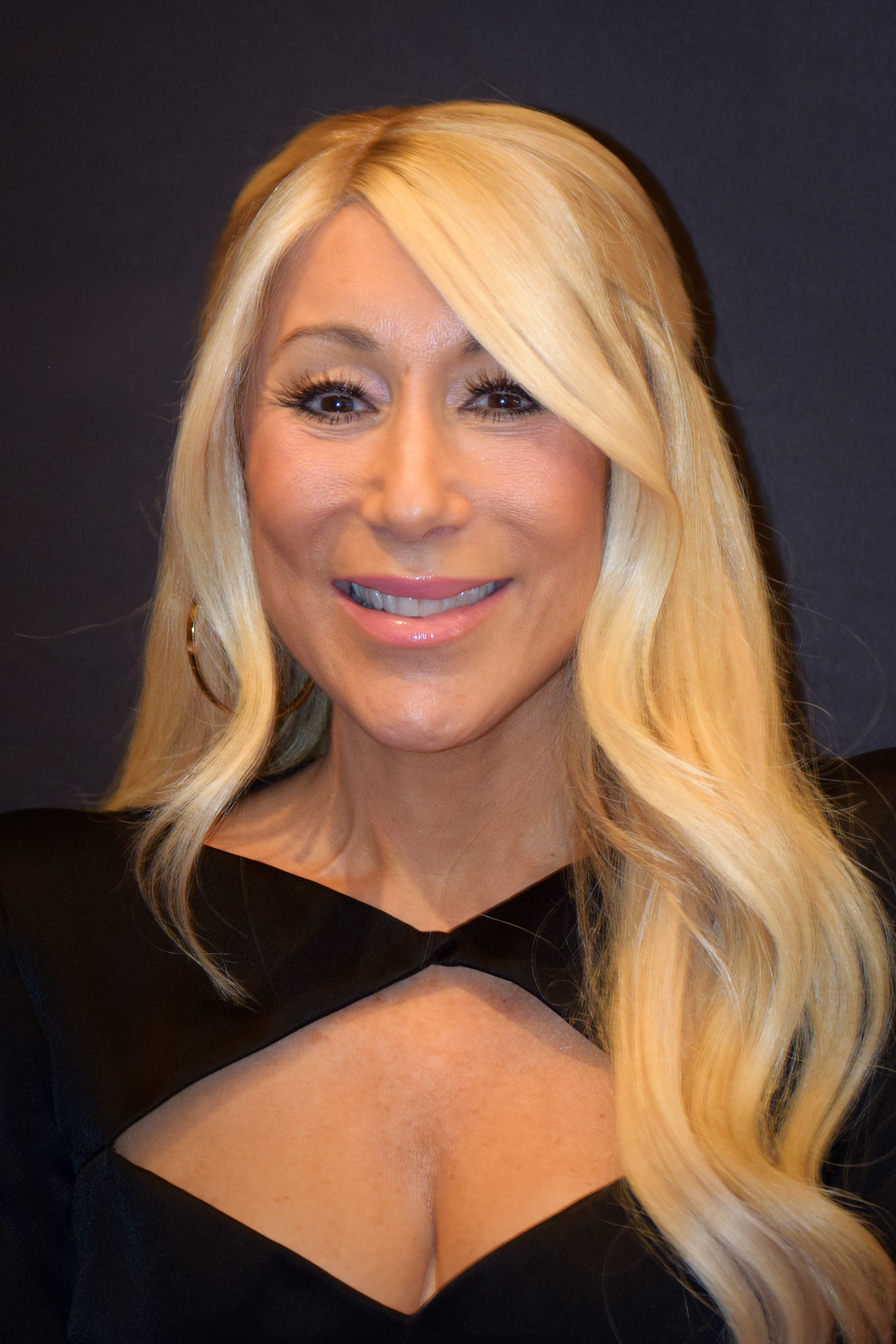
- Greiner in 2023
- Born: December 9, 1969 (age 56); Chicago, Illinois, U.S.
- Education: Loyola University Chicago (BA)
- Occupations: Television personality; entrepreneur
- Spouse: Dan Greiner
- Website: Official website

Lori Greiner is an American television personality and entrepreneur. She is known for her QVC show Clever & Unique Creations (2000–present), for which she has been called the "Queen of QVC" and additionally being an investor on the reality series Shark Tank (2012–present) on ABC. She has hundreds of inventions and holds over 120 patents. She is the president and founder of For Your Ease Only, Inc.

== Early life ==
Greiner grew up in the North side of Chicago. She majored in communications at Loyola University Chicago and worked for the Chicago Tribune while in college.

== Career ==
Greiner was an aspiring playwright and sold jewelry on the side before seeing success as an entrepreneur.

She is the president and founder of For Your Ease Only, which launched in 1996. Also in 1996, she created and patented a plastic earring organizer; JCPenney picked up the product before the holiday season, allowing her to pay off a $300,000 loan in 18 months. In addition to jewelry storage, she has patented consumer products in categories including cosmetic organization, travel, electronics, and household items. Greiner has invented hundreds of products and holds 120 patents.

After her success with J.C. Penney, Greiner expanded her company, with her products appearing on Home Shopping Network and in the retail store Bed Bath & Beyond. In 2000, she began hosting a show on QVC, "Clever & Unique Creations by Lori Greiner". Her many appearances on the network led to her nickname, "The Queen of QVC".

In 2012, Greiner joined the TV series Shark Tank. In 2014, her investment in Scrub Daddy, a company which produces a texture-changing household sponge, was regarded as one of the biggest successes in Shark Tank history. Her other early Shark Tank investments include Bantam Bagels (acquired by T. Marzetti Company in 2018, the product has been discontinued), Squatty Potty, ReadeRest, Paint Brush Cover, Hold Your Haunches, Drop Stop, FiberFix, Simply Fit Board, Sleep Styler, and Screenmend. Greiner's book, Invent it, Sell it, Bank it! – Make Your Million Dollar Idea into a Reality, was published in March 2014.

== Personal life ==
Lori Greiner and Dan Greiner are married.
