= Kind (company) =

American food company

Kind LLC
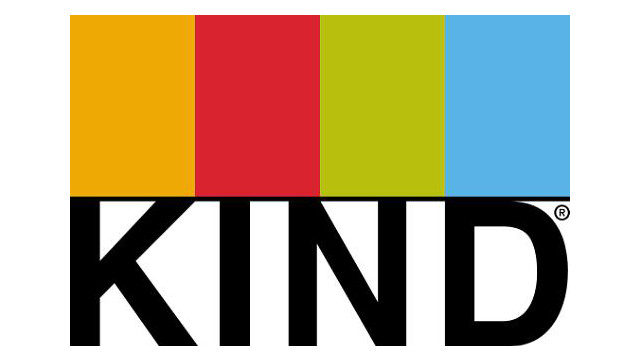
- Trade name: Kind Healthy Snacks
- Type: Subsidiary
- Industry: Food
- Founded: 2004; 22 years ago
- Founder: Daniel Lubetzky
- Fate: Acquired by Mars in 2020
- Headquarters: New York City, U.S.
- Products: Snack Bars, Granola Bars, Granola
- Revenue: US$5.0 billion
- Parent: Mars, Incorporated
- Website: kindsnacks.com

Kind LLC (doing business as Kind Healthy Snacks), stylized as KIND, is an American snack food company based in New York City. It was founded in 2004 by Daniel Lubetzky. Since 2020, it has been a subsidiary of Mars Inc.

== History ==
Daniel Lubetzky founded Kind in 2004. The company earned about $1 million in revenue their first year.

In 2008, private equity firm VMG Partners invested in Kind. The investment enabled the company to scale its sampling efforts to get more people to try Kind bars. When VMG got involved, Kind bars were only sold in 20,000 locations and Lubetzky's sampling budget was $800. By 2009, that budget was $800,000 and offering free samples became a large part of the Kind marketing plan. In 2014, Lubetzky bought all of VMG's shares.

Today, Kind Bars are sold at more than 150,000 stores in the US. In 2014, they sold over 458 million bars and granola pouches, almost doubling 2013's sales. The company now has about five hundred employees.

Kind acquired North Carolina–based Creative Snacks in October 2019.

In February 2020, Kind launched an expansion into frozen bars, refrigerated nut-butter bars, and chocolate clusters. In December 2020, Kind acquired snack bar company Nature's Bakery.

=== Kind movement ===
Through the KIND Movement, Kind aims to create a thriving community of people who choose kindness and make kindness a state of mind. In the spirit of this movement, in 2009, Kind launched Do the Kind Thing, an evolving platform that empowers people to turn KIND acts into support for causes. The Kind Movement includes Kind acts, #kindawesome cards, and Kind Causes. To date, Kind has performed, facilitated and celebrated over 1 million Kind acts and has been recognized by Time magazine as a "New Way to Make a Difference".

=== Mars ownership ===
In 2017, Mars purchased a minority stake in Kind. The deal valued the company at over $4 billion. That same year, sales reached $718.9 million.

In November 2020, Mars announced that it would increase its minority position to full ownership, in a deal worth $5 billion.

== Products ==
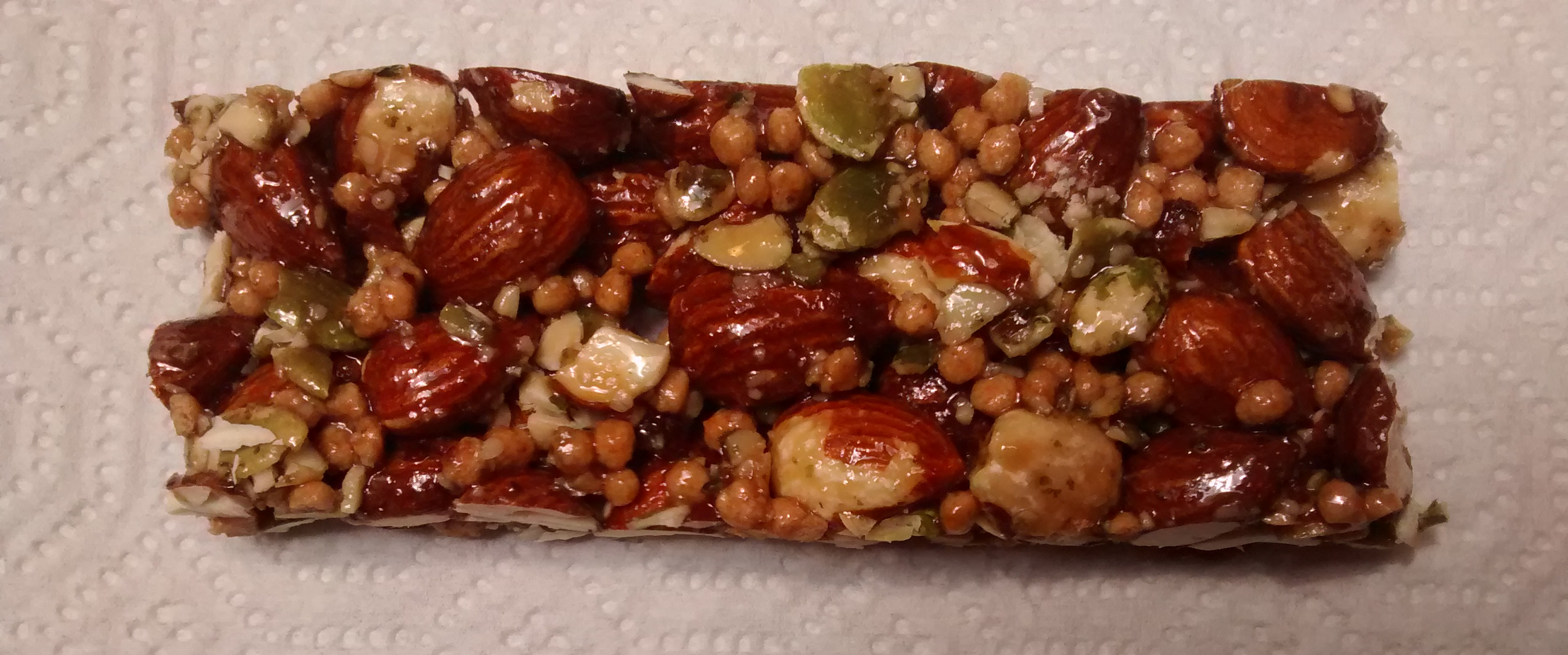
A Strong & Kind hickory smoked almond protein bar

Kind currently offers eight lines: Kind Fruit & Nut, Kind Plus, Kind Nuts & Spices, Kind Healthy Grains Bars, Kind Healthy Grains Clusters, Strong & Kind, Kind Breakfast, Pressed by Kind, and Kind Frozen.

In 2008, they launched Kind Plus, a line of whole nut and fruit bars with fiber and antioxidants.

In 2010, they launched smaller portioned, 100 calorie-range Kind minis. In 2011, they launched a line of Kind Healthy Grains Clusters granola, made from a blend of five grains. In 2012, Kind brought in Kind Nuts & Spices, made with whole nuts flavored with spices that contain 5g of sugar or less per bar. In 2013, Kind launched a line of Kind Healthy Grains granola bars. In 2014, Kind launched its first savory snack line, Strong & Kind, which has 10 grams of soy-and-whey free protein. Kind Breakfast was launched in 2016.

In 2016, Kind announced an extension to their nuts and spices and fruit and nut lines, to now include Dark Chocolate Almond & Mint.

In May 2025, Kind announced changes to its packaging, releasing recyclable packaging for a single Kind bar flavor to select Whole Foods locations.

In non-English speaking countries, the brand is marketed as BE-KIND.

== Controversies ==
In 2015, the Federal Food and Drug Administration (FDA) called out Kind for labeling four of their snack bars with the word, "healthy" and incorporating a plus in the design. According to the FDA, in order to be considered healthy, a snack food must contain 1 gram or less of saturated fat. Furthermore, a plus must indicate that a snack bar contains 10 percent more nutrients than a bar designated by the FDA as representative of the snack bar category.

In response to a letter from the U.S. Food and Drug Administration (FDA), the company issued a statement on its website indicating that it would revise the labeling of the specified four product flavors. Additionally, the company announced that it is conducting a comprehensive review of its entire product line to ensure that all labels comply with FDA regulations.

In a separate communication with NPR, company representative Cohen stated that nuts—central ingredients in many of the company's snack bars and a key factor in their popularity—contain healthful fats that surpass the saturated fat limits permitted under the FDA's current standards.

== See also ==
- Energy bar
- Clif Bar
- Nature Valley
- Protein bar
