= List of Shark Tank investments =

== United States ==
=== Investors ===
In the United States Shark Tank series, there are main investors and guests. The primary investors have been Kevin O'Leary, Barbara Corcoran, Daymond John, Robert Herjavec, Kevin Harrington, Mark Cuban, and Lori Greiner. Guest investors have included celebrities such as Jeff Foxworthy, Ashton Kutcher, Kevin Hart, Chris Sacca and Emma Grede.

=== Investments ===
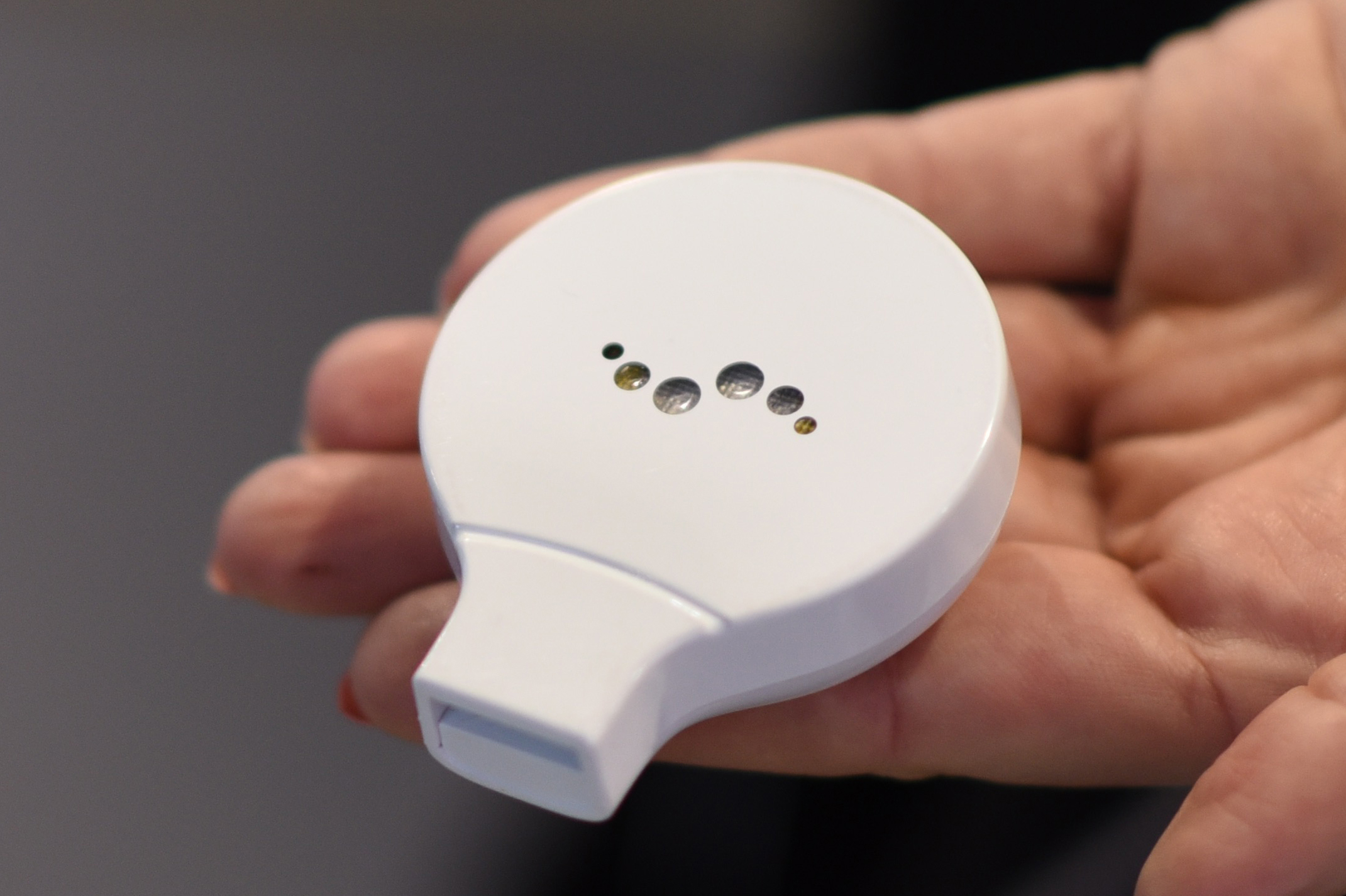
Breathometer received $1,000,000 for 30% equity from 5 different Sharks in Season 5. The company later shut down after an investigation by the FTC found that the company knowingly made false claims of accuracy.

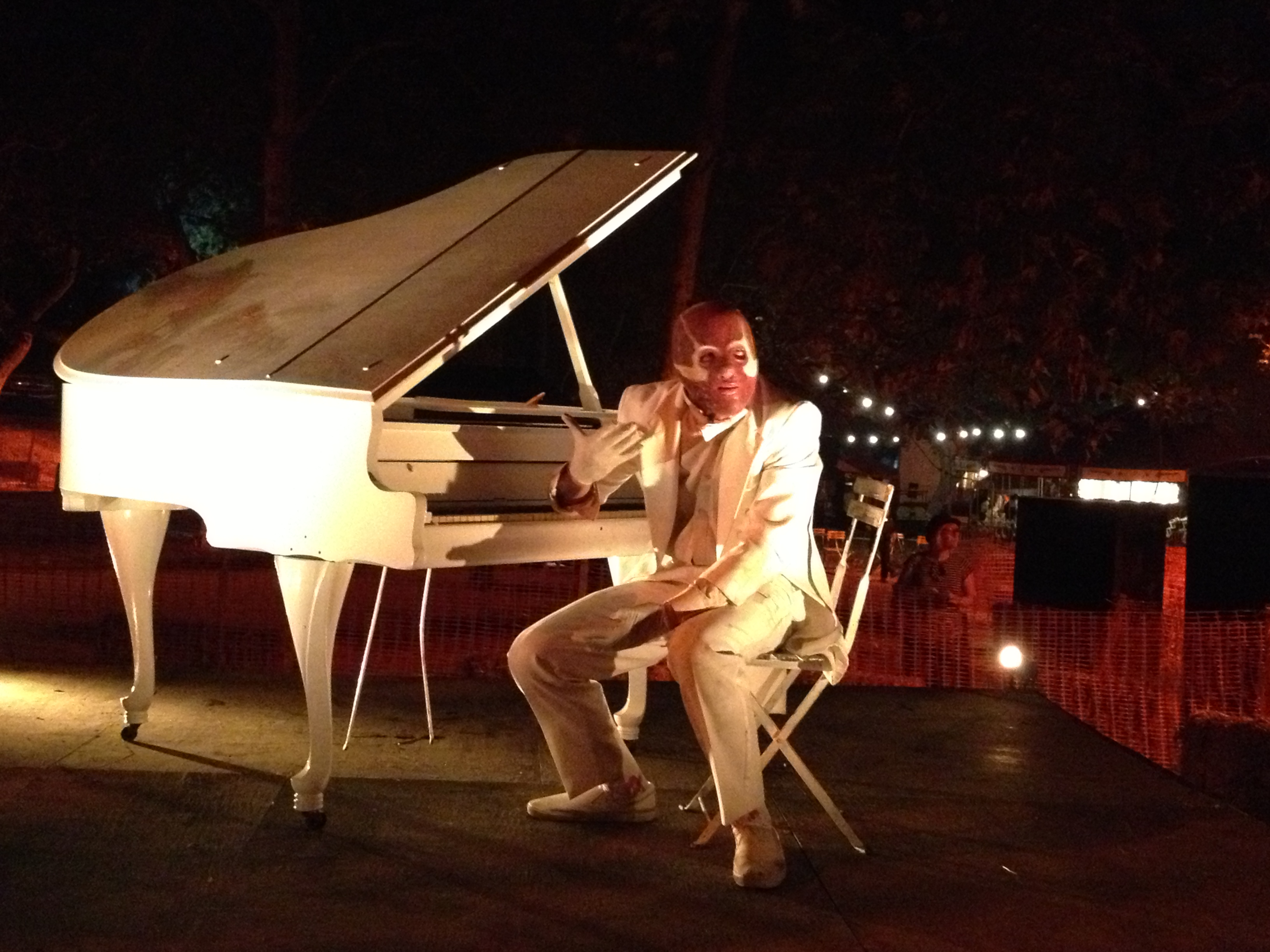
An attraction at the Los Angeles Hayride, owned by Ten Thirty One Productions, investment from Mark Cuban during Season 5.

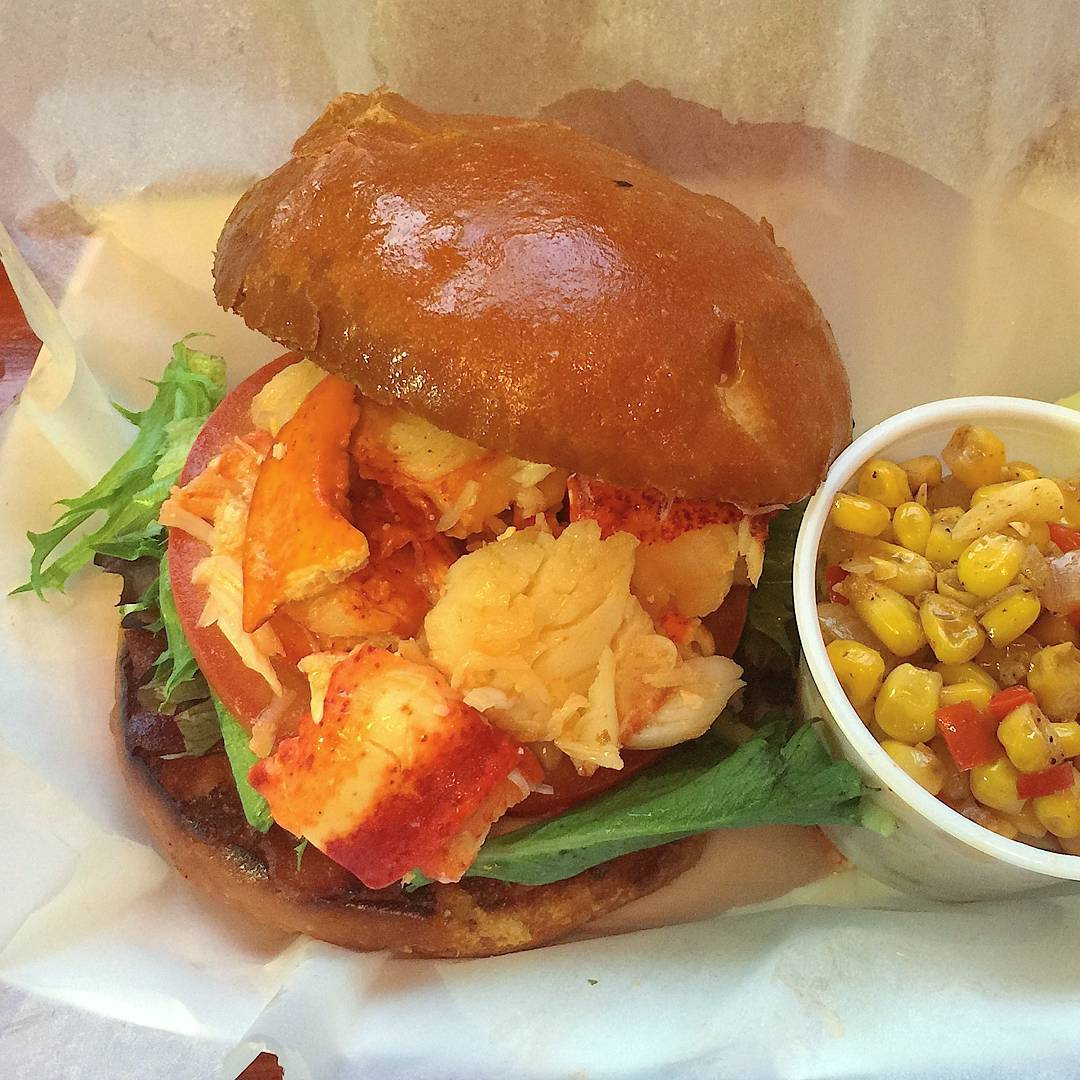
A BLT from Cousins Maine Lobster shown in 2015.

Company	Funding amount	Shark(s) participating	Episode
Ava the Elephant	$50,000 for 55% equity	Barbara Corcoran	Season 1, Episode 1
BeatBox Beverages	$1 million for one-third of the company	Mark Cuban	Season 6, Episode 6
Bombas	$200,000 for 17.5% equity	Daymond John	Season 6, Episode 1
Boost Oxygen	$1,000,000 for 6.25% equity	Kevin O'Leary	Season 11, Episode 2
Bottle Breacher	$150,000 for 20% equity	Mark Cuban, Kevin O'Leary	Season 6, Episode 8
Breathometer	$650,000 for 30% equity	Mark Cuban, Kevin O'Leary, Daymond John, Robert Herjavec, Lori Greiner	Season 5, Episode 2
Buena Papa	$400,000 for 19% equity	Robert Herjavec	Season 15, Episode 4
Bubba’s-Q Boneless Ribs	$300,000 for 30% equity and licensing rights	Daymond John	Season 5, Episode 11
ChordBuddy	$175,000 for 20% equity	Robert Herjavec	Season 3, Episode 9
CoinOut	$250,000 for 15% equity	Robert Herjavec	Season 9, Episode 23
Cousins Maine Lobster	$55,000 for 15% equity	Barbara Corcoran	Season 4, Episode 6
Drop Stop	$300,000 for 20% equity	Lori Greiner	Season 4, Episode 20
Dude Wipes	$300,000 for 25% equity	Mark Cuban	Season 7, Episode 4
Fairytail Pet Care	$75,000 for 20% equity	Barbara Corcoran	Season 15, Episode 4
Freeloader	$200,000 for 33% equity	Robert Herjavec	Season 5, Episode 3
Grace and Lace	$175,000 for 10% equity	Barbara Corcoran	Season 5, Episode 10
GrooveBook	$150,000 for 80% of licensing profits	Mark Cuban, Kevin O'Leary	Season 5, Episode 13
Hold Your Haunches	$75,000 for 40% equity. Includes $100,000 line of credit.	Barbara Corcoran, Lori Greiner	Season 5, Episode 23
I Want to Draw a Cat For You	$25,000 for 33% equity	Mark Cuban	Season 3, Episode 2
Kisstixx	$200,000 for 40% equity	Mark Cuban	Season 3, Episode 7
Krapp Strapp	$65,000 for 33.3% equity	Daymond John & Lori Grenier	Season 15, Episode 6
Loliware	$600,000 for 25% equity	Mark Cuban	Season 7, Episode 2
Lollacup	$100,000 for 40% equity	Mark Cuban, Robert Herjavec	Season 3, Episode 12
Lumio	$350,000 for 10% equity	Robert Herjavec	Season 6, Episode 6
Nardo's Natural	$75,000 for 50% equity	Barbara Corcoran	Season 3, Episode 5
Notehall	$90,000. Deal fell through after show.	Barbara Corcoran, Mark Cuban	Season 3, Episode 4
Origaudio	$150,000 for 15% equity. Accepted offer from Robert Herjavec. Deal fell through after filming.	Robert Herjavec	Season 2, Episode 8
PaddleSmash	$250,000 for 20% equity	Robert Herjavec & Mark Cuban	Season 15, Episode 4
Readerest	$150,000 for 65% equity	Lori Greiner	Season 3, Episode 6
Red Dress Boutique	$1.2 million in exchange for 10% equity	Mark Cuban, Robert Herjavec	Season 6, Episode 5
Scrub Daddy	$200,000 in exchange for 20% equity	Lori Greiner	Season 4, Episode 7
Screen Mend	$30,000 in exchange for 50% equity	Lori Greiner	Season 5, Episode 4
SignalVault	$200,000	Lori Greiner, Robert Herjavec	Season 7, Episode 1
Simple Sugars	$100,000 in exchange for 33% equity	Mark Cuban	Season 4, Episode 19
Snow in Seconds	$50,000 in exchange for 33.3% equity	Barbara Corcoran	Season 15, Episode 8
Supermix Studio	$250,000 in exchange for 20% equity + 3.5% royalty until $250k is paid	Robert Herjavec & Lori Grenier	Season 12, Episode 6
Ten Thirty One Productions	$2 million in exchange for 20% equity	Mark Cuban	Season 5, Episode 6
Tipsy Elves	$100,000 in exchange for 10% equity	Robert Herjavec	Season 5, Episode 12
Tik Pik	$75,000 in exchange for 16% equity	Mark Cuban	Season 12, Episode 6
Wicked Good Cupcakes	$75,000 for royalties ($1 per cupcake sold up to $75,000, then $.50 per cupcake sold thereafter)	Kevin O'Leary	Season 4, Episode 22
Wine & Design	$150,000 for 10% equity and $350,000 loan with 12% interest	Kevin O'Leary	Season 8, Episode 24
The Woobles	$450,000 for 6% equity (did not go through after the episode)	Mark Cuban, Lori Greiner	Season 14, Episode 2
Gatsby Chocolate	$250,000 for 20% plus $250,000 loan at 6%	Lori Greiner and Mark Cuban	Season 15, Episode 1
Gently Soap	$75,000 for 25% equity	Candace Nelson	Season 15, Episode 1
Stormbag	$200,000 for 30% equity	Mark Cuban, Lori Greiner	Season 15, Episode 2
Toast-It arepa	$150,000 for 20% equity	Daniel Lubetzky	Season 15, Episode 2
Glove Wrap	$50,000 for 22% equity	Mark Cuban, Michael Rubin	Season 15, Episode 3
FairyTail Pet Care	$75,000 for 22% equity	Barbara Corcoran	Season 15, Episode 4
Genius Litter	$250,000 for 8% + 2% advisory shares	Mark Cuban, Lori Greiner, Robert Herjavec	Season 15, Episode 13
AU Baby	$80,000 for 35% equity	Kevin O'Leary	Season 15, Episode 13
Torch Warriorwear	$150,000 for 22.5% equity		Season 15, Episode 13
PSYONIC	$1,000,000 for 6% equity	Lori Greiner, Daymond John, Kevin O'Leary	Season 15, Episode 15
Yum Crumbs	$100,000 in exchange for 20% equity	Barbara Corcoran, Daymond John	Season 15, Episode 7

== Australia ==
=== Investors ===
The primary investors on the Australian version of Shark Tank have been Janine Allis, Steve Baxter, Andrew Banks, Naomi Simson, Glen Richards, John McGrath, Sabri Suby, Catriona Wallace, Davie Fogarty, Jane Lu and Robert Herjavec.

=== Investments ===
Company	Funding amount	Shark(s) participating	Episode
CancerAid	$250,000 for 5% equity	Andrew Banks, Glen Richards	Season 3, Episode 1
Car Next Door	$300,000 for 4% equity	Steve Baxter	Season 2, Episode 2
Case Boards	$40,000 for 35% equity	Janine Allis, Andrew Banks	Season 1, Episode 1
Catch 'N' Release	$200,000 to acquire company, plus 5% royalty to original owners. First acquisition offer accepted on Shark Tank Australia.	Glen Richards	Season 3, Episode 2
Cricket Cooler	$80,000 for 20% stake, plus $200,000 loan	Naomi Simson	Season 1, Episode 1
Hey Day Butter	$50,000 for 33% equity	Naomi Simson	Season 3, Episode 3
Hoo Haa Headphones	$30 for 30% equity	Andrew Banks, Naomi Simson	Season 3, Episode 2
Strange Grains	$350,000 for 25% equity	Naomi Simson	Season 3, Episode 1
