= List of Shark Tank episodes =

Shark Tank is an American reality television series produced by Mark Burnett. The show features a panel of investors called "sharks," who decide whether to invest as entrepreneurs make business presentations on their company or product. The sharks often find weaknesses and faults in an entrepreneur's concept, product, or business model. Some of the investors try to soften the impact of rejection, like panel member Lori Greiner, while others such as Kevin O'Leary can be "brutal" and show "no patience even for tales of hardship." The sharks are paid as cast stars of the show, but the money they invest is their own. The entrepreneur can make a handshake deal (gentleman's agreement) on the show if a panel member is interested. However, if all of the panel members opt out, the entrepreneur leaves empty-handed. In 2015, a companion spin-off series called Beyond the Tank premiered, which follows up on some of the businesses that have appeared on the show. In this spin-off series it was revealed that sharks can still make a deal with a business that was rejected in the "tank".

As of October 7, 2026, 380 episodes of Shark Tank have aired, currently in its eighteenth season. Shark Tank's eighteenth season premiered on September 30, 2026.

== Series overview ==
Season	Episodes	Originally released	
Season	Episodes	First released	Last released
1	14	August 9, 2009	February 5, 2010
2	9	March 20, 2011	May 13, 2011
3	15	January 20, 2012	May 18, 2012
4	26	September 14, 2012	May 17, 2013
5	29	September 20, 2013	May 16, 2014
6	29	September 26, 2014	May 15, 2015
7	29	September 25, 2015	May 20, 2016
8	24	September 23, 2016	May 12, 2017
9	24	October 1, 2017	February 25, 2018
10	23	October 7, 2018	May 12, 2019
11	24	September 29, 2019	May 15, 2020
12	25	October 16, 2020	May 21, 2021
13	24	October 8, 2021	May 20, 2022
14	22	September 23, 2022	May 19, 2023
15	22	September 29, 2023	May 3, 2024
16	20	October 18, 2024	May 16, 2025
17	18	September 24, 2025	April 22, 2026
18	TBA	September 30, 2026	TBA

== Episodes ==
"Yes", when displayed in the main season articles, means one or more Sharks initiated a deal; it may or may not be finalized after completing a due diligence process.

=== Season 1 (2009–10) ===
Kevin Harrington, Daymond John, Kevin O'Leary, Barbara Corcoran, and Robert Herjavec appear as the sharks in every episode this season.

No. overall	No. in season	Title	Original release date	Prod. code	U.S. viewers (millions)
1	1	"Episode 101"	August 9, 2009	101	4.15
2	2	"Episode 102"	August 16, 2009	102	5.59
3	3	"Episode 103"	August 23, 2009	103	5.45
4	4	"Episode 104"	August 30, 2009	104	4.89
5	5	"Episode 105"	September 6, 2009	105	3.35
6	6	"Episode 106"	September 13, 2009	106	4.20
7	7	"Episode 107"	September 29, 2009	107	4.75
8	8	"Episode 108"	October 6, 2009	108	5.15
9	9	"Episode 109"	October 13, 2009	109	5.24
10	10	"Episode 111"	October 20, 2009	111	5.92
11	11	"Episode 112"	January 8, 2010	112	3.94
12	12	"Episode 113"	January 15, 2010	113	4.43
13	13	"Episode 114"	January 29, 2010	114	4.40
14	14	"Episode 110"	February 5, 2010	110	4.65

=== Season 2 (2011) ===
This is Kevin Harrington's last season as a shark. Comedian Jeff Foxworthy appeared as a guest shark in two episodes this season. Mark Cuban appeared as a shark in several episodes this season; in season three he would become a regular.

No. overall	No. in season	Title	Original release date	Prod. code	U.S. viewers (millions)
15	1	"Episode 201"	March 20, 2011	205	6.13
16	2	"Episode 202"	March 25, 2011	202	4.65
17	3	"Episode 203"	April 1, 2011	206	4.87
18	4	"Episode 204"	April 8, 2011	203	4.67
19	5	"Episode 115"	April 15, 2011	115	5.28
20	6	"Episode 205"	April 22, 2011	207	4.83
21	7	"Episode 206"	April 29, 2011	201	4.58
22	8	"Episode 207"	May 6, 2011	204	4.45
23	9	"Episode 208"	May 13, 2011	208	4.99

=== Season 3 (2012) ===
Lori Greiner appeared as a shark in several episodes this season; in season four she would become a regular.

No. overall	No. in season	Title	Original release date	Prod. code	U.S. viewers (millions)
24	1	"Episode 301"	January 20, 2012	301	6.25
25	2	"Episode 302"	January 27, 2012	302	5.44
26	3	"Episode 303"	February 3, 2012	303	5.16
27	4	"Episode 304"	February 10, 2012	304	5.89
28	5	"Episode 305"	February 17, 2012	305	5.69
29	6	"Episode 306"	February 24, 2012	306	5.86
30	7	"Episode 307"	March 2, 2012	307	5.69
31	8	"Episode 308"	March 9, 2012	308	5.11
32	9	"Episode 309"	March 16, 2012	309	5.97
33	10	"Episode 310"	March 23, 2012	310	5.78
34	11	"Episode 311"	April 13, 2012	311	5.49
35	12	"Episode 312"	April 27, 2012	312	5.42
36	13	"Episode 313"	May 4, 2012	313	6.06
37	14	"Episode 314"	May 11, 2012	314	5.59
38	15	"Episode 315"	May 18, 2012	315	5.52

=== Season 4 (2012–13) ===
No. overall	No. in season	Title	Original release date	Prod. code	U.S. viewers (millions)
39	1	"Episode 401"	September 14, 2012	401	6.40
40	2	"Episode 402"	September 21, 2012	402	5.97
41	3	"Episode 403"	September 28, 2012	403	6.05
42	4	"Episode 404"	October 5, 2012	404	6.15; 6.869
43	5	"Episode 405"	October 12, 2012	405	6.48
44	6	"Episode 406"	October 19, 2012	406	7.08
45	7	"Episode 407"	October 26, 2012	407	6.84
46	8	"Episode 408"	November 2, 2012	408	7.44
47	9	"Episode 409"	November 9, 2012	409	6.69
48	10	"Episode 410"	November 16, 2012	410	6.82
49	11	"Episode 411"	December 4, 2012	411	6.89
50	12	"Episode 412"	January 4, 2013	412	6.42
51	13	"Episode 413"	January 11, 2013	413	6.87
52	14	"Episode 414"	February 1, 2013	414	6.73
53	15	"Episode 415"	February 8, 2013	415	6.13
54	16	"Episode 416"	February 15, 2013	416	6.51
55	17	"Episode 417"	February 22, 2013	417	6.51
56	18	"Episode 418"	March 1, 2013	418	6.69
57	19	"Episode 419"	March 8, 2013	419	6.89
58	20	"Episode 420"	March 29, 2013	420	6.19
59	21	"Episode 421"	April 5, 2013	421	7.04
60	22	"Episode 422"	April 26, 2013	423	6.61
61	23	"Episode 423"	May 3, 2013	424	5.72
62	24	"Episode 424"	May 10, 2013	425	6.25
63	25	"Episode 425"	May 17, 2013	422	5.11
64	26	"Episode 426"	May 17, 2013	426	6.68

=== Season 5 (2013–14) ===
From this season on, as well as retroactively, Mark Cuban insisted that the production company relinquish its equity clause (two percent of their profits or five percent equity in their company) with respect to featured businesses who choose to do a deal with the sharks.
John Paul Mitchell Systems co-founder John Paul DeJoria and New York Giants owner Steve Tisch appeared as guest sharks this season.

No. overall	No. in season	Title	Original release date	Prod. code	U.S. viewers (millions)
65	1	"Lynnae's Gourmet Pickles, Postcard on the Run, Rolodoc, Sweet Ballz"	September 20, 2013	501	6.86
66	2	"Breathometer, Man Medals, Mango Mango, Kane & Couture"	September 27, 2013	502	6.94
67	3	"Fairytale Wishes, Freeloader, Kook'n Kap, Rapid Ramen"	October 4, 2013	503	6.45
68	4	"Hamboards, Scan, ScreenMend, Sunday Night Slow Jams"	October 11, 2013	504	6.53
69	5	"BareEase, Rent A Goat, RuffleButts, Veggie Mama"	October 18, 2013	505	6.64
70	6	"Elephant Chat, FiberFix, Ten Thirty One Productions, Total Merchant Resources"	October 25, 2013	506	7.39
71	7	"180CUP, Better Life, Kymera, Tree T Pee"	November 1, 2013	507	7.31
72	8	"Paparazzi Proposals, Bellybuds, Schulzies Bread Pudding, PetPaint"	November 8, 2013	508	7.32
73	9	"DoorBot, Magic Moments, SLAWSA, Surprise Ride"	November 15, 2013	509	6.48
74	10	"YUBO, Pursecase, Chocomize, Grace and Lace"	November 22, 2013	510	7.06
75	11	"Virtuix, SpiritHoods, Fohawx, Bubba's Q BBQ"	December 6, 2013	511	7.55
76	12	"Cashmere Hair, The Hanukah Tree Topper, Tipsy Elves, Line-Netics"	December 13, 2013	512	7.17
77	13	"Bounce Boot Camp, Wall Rx, Eyebloc, GrooveBook"	January 10, 2014	513	7.36
78	14	"Alaska Glacial Mud Co., invisiPlug, LockerBones, Balloon Distractions"	January 17, 2014	514	7.44
79	15	"SwimZip, FitDeck, LifeCaps, Freshly Picked"	January 24, 2014	515	8.18
80	16	"Cow Wow, Nexersys, Cycloramic, The Cookie Dough Cafe"	January 31, 2014	516	7.49
81	17	"Moberi, Spy Escape and Evasion, DDP YOGA, Southern Culture Artisan Foods"	February 21, 2014	517	6.21
82	18	"Cheek'd, Zipit, Bambooee, Buzzy"	February 28, 2014	518	7.79
83	19	"Revolights, Squeeky Knees, Buffer Bit, U-lace"	March 7, 2014	519	7.69
84	20	"Define Bottle, iReTron, Boo Boo Goo, Henry's Humdingers"	March 14, 2014	520	7.49
85	21	"Chapul, Garage Door Lock, Morninghead, Packback"	March 21, 2014	521	8.29
86	22	"Kodiak Cakes, Monkey Mat, Plated, The Paint Brush Cover"	April 4, 2014	522	7.49
87	23	"Happy Feet, Lord Nut Levington, Velocity Signs, Hold Your Haunches"	April 10, 2014	523	6.85
88	24	"Taylor Robinson Music, Funtime Express, Power Pot, Quickstop Fire Sprinkler Tools"	April 11, 2014	524	6.95
89	25	"ilumi, Zoobean, Intelli-Stopper, Fort Magic"	April 18, 2014	525	6.77
90	26	"Crio Bru, Rugged Races, Cerebral Success, Mo's Bows"	April 25, 2014	526	7.11
91	27	"The Bouqs Company, Angellift, HangEase, Susty Party"	May 2, 2014	527	8.33
92	28	"Oru Kayak, Bon Affair, Hargitt Marine Services, Cinnaholic"	May 9, 2014	528	7.40
93	29	"Season Finale: Baker's Edge, Foot Fairy, Tie-Not, BZBOX"	May 16, 2014	529	6.74

Cinnaholic

=== Season 6 (2014–15) ===
Nick Woodman, creator of the GoPro camera, appeared as a guest shark in two episodes this season.

No. overall	No. in season	Title	Original release date	Prod. code	U.S. viewers (millions)
94	1	"Season 6 Premiere: Sleeping Baby, Hammer & Nails, Amber, and Bombas"	September 26, 2014	601	7.45
95	2	"Season 6 Premiere: Roominate, Wedding Wagon, Floating Mug and Kronos Golf"	September 26, 2014	602	7.45
96	3	"Week 2: SoapSox, Heart Pup, Ninja Cards, DrumPants"	October 3, 2014	603	7.29
97	4	"Week 3: FunCakes Rental, Paper Box Pilots, Tablejacks USA, Reviver"	October 10, 2014	606	7.34
98	5	"Week 4: Jungle Jumparoo, The Caddy Girls, Red Dress Boutique, Sun-Staches"	October 17, 2014	605	7.32
99	6	"Week 5: Oilerie USA, Honeyfund, EmergenSee, Beatbox Beverages, and Jimmy Kimmel"	October 24, 2014	604	6.89
100	7	"Week 6: Titin, Beardbrand, Singtrix, Myself Belts"	October 31, 2014	609	7.80
101	8	"Week 7: The Natural Grip, Priority One Canine, Man-PACK, Bottle Breacher"	November 7, 2014	608	7.80
102	9	"Week 8, The 100th Episode: Storm Stoppers, Pipsnacks, Squatty Potty, Heidi Ho"	November 14, 2014	610	7.63
103	10	"Week 9: Kitchen Safe, Off the Cob, Magic Cook, Earth-Log"	November 21, 2014	612	7.91
104	11	"Week 10: Biaggi, S.W.A.G Essentials, Gameday Couture, Zipz"	December 5, 2014	613	7.22
105	12	"Week 11: Mensch on a Bench, Eve Drop, Q Flex, Hoppy Paws"	December 12, 2014	614	7.04
106	13	"Week 12: Coffee Meets Bagel, SkinnyShirt, Doorman, Bantam Bagel"	January 9, 2015	611	7.73
107	14	"Week 13: Scratch and Grain, Bottle Bright, Vestpakz, EvRewares"	January 13, 2015	607	7.48
108	15	"Week 14: Lumio, Napwell, TurboPup, Bello Verde"	January 16, 2015	619	8.64
109	16	"Week 15: Victoria's Kitchen, Green Box, Tycoon Real Estate, PhoneSoap"	January 30, 2015	620	7.93
110	17	"Week 16: Fresh Patch, Balm Chicky, Drain Strain, BedJet"	February 3, 2015	616	7.14
111	18	"Week 17: Himalayan Dog Chew, The Lip Bar, BevBoy, FunBites"	February 6, 2015	615	7.68
112	19	"Week 18: Sseko Designs, Gold Rush Nugget Bucket, Boobypack, Lumi"	February 13, 2015	622	7.73
113	20	"Week 19: LuminAID, Taaluma Totes, Keen Home, Scholly"	February 20, 2015	617	8.43
114	21	"Week 20: Coco Jack, BedRyder, Frill Clothing, and the Twin Z Pillow"	March 6, 2015	618	8.21
115	22	"Week 21: Echo Valley Meats, EmazingLights, AquaVault, and Naja"	March 13, 2015	621	7.24
116	23	"Week 22: BeeSweet Lemonade, BrandYourself, iCPooch, and The Home T"	March 20, 2015	628	7.50
117	24	"Week 23: Budsies, Bee Thinking, PullyPalz, Forus Athletics"	April 10, 2015	629	6.65
118	25	"Week 24: NeatCheeks, Melni Connectors, Beneath the Ink, PittMoss"	April 17, 2015	627	6.51
119	26	"Week 25: ZinePak, SnagaStool, Buck Mason, Noene USA"	April 24, 2015	624	7.94
120	27	"Week 26: Zero Pollution Motors, The Paleo Diet Foods, World Record Striper Company, Frameri"	May 1, 2015	626	7.07
121	28	"Week 27: Zoom Interiors, Sunscreen Mist, SynDaver Labs, You Kick Ass"	May 8, 2015	625	6.68
122	29	"Season Finale: Shark Wheel, Gato Cafe, Sway Motorsports, Spikeball"	May 15, 2015	623	7.04

=== Season 7 (2015–16) ===
Actor Ashton Kutcher, music manager Troy Carter, and venture investor Chris Sacca appeared as guest sharks this season.

No. overall	No. in season	Title	Original release date	Prod. code	U.S. viewers (millions)
123	1	"Season 7 Premiere: Guest Shark Ashton Kutcher, The Beebo, ACTON, McClary Bros., SignalVault"	September 25, 2015	701	6.08
124	2	"Week 2: O'Dang Hummus, Mikki Bey Eyelash Extensions, LOLIWARE, Splikity"	October 2, 2015	702	6.82
125	3	"Week 3: Guest Shark Troy Carter, Foot Cardigan, Two Guys Bow Ties, ValPark, Nerdwax"	October 9, 2015	703	5.84
126	4	"Week 4: Table 87, EZ-Pee-Z, Milk + Brookies, Dude Products"	October 16, 2015	706	5.85
127	5	"Week 5: Switch Witch, Three Jerks Jerky, The Skinny Mirror, xCraft"	October 23, 2015	705	6.36
128	6	"Week 6: Rent Like a Champion, HotShot, Windcatcher, Stem Center USA"	October 30, 2015	704	6.16
129	7	"Week 7: Jimmy Kimmel and Guillermo, Wink Frozen Desserts, Saavy Naturals, Clean Cube, Simply Fit Board"	November 6, 2015	708	6.71
130	8	"Week 8: AfreSHeet, Unshrinkit, Grip Clean, PolarPro, and Sharks at the White House"	November 13, 2015	709	6.14
131	9	"Week 9: National Association of Bubble Soccer, Umano, Brazi Bites, SockTABS"	November 20, 2015	711	6.90
132	10	"Week 10: Leaux Racing Trikes, Glow Recipe, Sarah Oliver Handbags, Trunkster"	December 4, 2015	714	6.16
133	11	"Week 11: GeekMyTree, Beard Head, Lovepop, PiperWai"	December 11, 2015	712	6.00
134	12	"Week 12: Extreme Sandbox, ABS Pancakes, Total Tie Keep, FireAvert"	January 5, 2016	713	4.32
135	13	"Week 13: Spretz, ezpz, Hungry Harvest, Controlled Chaos"	January 8, 2016	715	5.76
136	14	"Week 14: Hatch Baby, Village Scholarships, Fixed, Beard King"	January 15, 2016	707	5.64
137	15	"Week 15: Shefit, CO.ALITION, IcyBreeze, 2400 Expert"	January 29, 2016	716	6.81
138	16	"Week 16: R. Riveter, BearTek, Major Mom, Combat Flip Flops"	February 5, 2016	719	6.14
139	17	"Week 17: SmartPlate, Bee Free Honee, Float Baby and MTailor"	February 12, 2016	721	6.73
140	18	"Episode 18"	February 19, 2016	717	6.20
141	19	"Episode 19"	February 21, 2016	718	4.02
142	20	"Episode 20"	February 26, 2016	720	5.45
143	21	"Episode 21"	March 11, 2016	727	5.74
144	22	"Episode 22"	March 18, 2016	725	6.13
145	23	"Episode 23"	April 8, 2016	728	5.42
146	24	"Episode 24"	April 15, 2016	710	5.63
147	25	"Episode 25"	April 22, 2016	723	5.40
148	26	"Episode 26"	April 29, 2016	724	5.76
149	27	"Episode 27"	May 6, 2016	729	5.42
150	28	"Episode 28"	May 13, 2016	722	5.30
151	29	"Episode 29: Season Finale"	May 20, 2016	726	5.47

=== Season 8 (2016–17) ===
Venture investor Chris Sacca returned as a guest shark in several episodes this season.

No. overall	No. in season	Title	Original release date	Prod. code	U.S. viewers (millions)
152	1	"Episode 1"	September 23, 2016	801	4.98
153	2	"Episode 2"	September 30, 2016	802	5.02
154	3	"Episode 3"	October 7, 2016	804	4.86
155	4	"Episode 4"	October 14, 2016	803	5.19
156	5	"Episode 5"	October 21, 2016	806	5.42
157	6	"Episode 6"	October 28, 2016	805	4.41
158	7	"Episode 7"	November 4, 2016	808	5.22
159	8	"Episode 8"	November 11, 2016	809	5.43
160	9	"Episode 9"	November 18, 2016	810	5.19
161	10	"Episode 10"	December 2, 2016	807	5.20
162	11	"Episode 11"	December 9, 2016	812	4.91
163	12	"Episode 12"	January 6, 2017	813	5.78
164	13	"Episode 13"	January 13, 2017	811	5.86
165	14	"Episode 14"	January 27, 2017	815	5.97
166	15	"Episode 15"	February 3, 2017	814	5.68
167	16	"Episode 16"	February 10, 2017	816	5.81
168	17	"Episode 17"	February 17, 2017	817	5.22
169	18	"Episode 18"	February 24, 2017	818	5.86
170	19	"Episode 19"	March 3, 2017	819	6.08
171	20	"Episode 20"	April 7, 2017	822	4.88
172	21	"Episode 21"	April 14, 2017	823	4.38
173	22	"Episode 22"	April 21, 2017	820	4.58
174	23	"Episode 23"	May 5, 2017	824	4.40
175	24	"Episode 24"	May 12, 2017	826	4.01

=== Season 9 (2017–18) ===
Guest sharks this season include Spanx founder Sara Blakely, Virgin Group founder Richard Branson, brand marketer Rohan Oza, TV personality Bethenny Frankel, and former MLB star Alex Rodriguez.

The series moved to Sunday nights for this season. After the cancellation of Ten Days in the Valley, and with the March arrival of ABC's reboot of American Idol, the majority of episodes aired back-to-back in two-hour blocks.

No. overall	No. in season	Title	Original release date	Prod. code	U.S. viewers (millions)
176	1	"Episode 1"	October 1, 2017	903	5.12
177	2	"Episode 2"	October 1, 2017	904	5.12
178	3	"Episode 3"	October 8, 2017	906	4.73
179	4	"Episode 4"	October 15, 2017	901	4.64
180	5	"Episode 5"	October 22, 2017	825	4.29
181	6	"Episode 6"	October 29, 2017	902	3.51
182	7	"Episode 7"	October 29, 2017	821	3.18
183	8	"Episode 8"	November 5, 2017	905	4.03
184	9	"Episode 9"	November 5, 2017	914	3.32
185	10	"Episode 10"	November 12, 2017	912	4.24
186	11	"Episode 11"	November 12, 2017	907	3.63
187	12	"Episode 12"	November 26, 2017	909	4.07
188	13	"Episode 13"	December 3, 2017	910	3.70
189	14	"Episode 14"	January 7, 2018	915	4.68
190	15	"Episode 15"	January 7, 2018	916	3.86
191	16	"Episode 16"	January 14, 2018	908	5.40
192	17	"Episode 17"	January 14, 2018	911	4.65
193	18	"Episode 18"	January 21, 2018	917	3.94
194	19	"Episode 19"	January 21, 2018	913	3.76
195	20	"Episode 20"	January 28, 2018	918	4.52
196	21	"Episode 21"	January 28, 2018	919	3.90
197	22	"Episode 22"	February 11, 2018	920	2.87
198	23	"Episode 23"	February 18, 2018	921	3.12
199	24	"Episode 24"	February 25, 2018	922	3.15

=== Season 10 (2018–19) ===
Guest sharks for this season, subtitled "A Decade of Dreams," include Jamie Siminoff, the first guest shark to have sought a deal on the show (the sharks passed on his company Doorbot, now known as Ring).

No. overall	No. in season	Title	Original release date	Prod. code	U.S. viewers (millions)
200	1	"Episode 1"	October 7, 2018	1001	2.96
201	2	"Episode 2"	October 14, 2018	1003	3.64
202	3	"Episode 3"	October 21, 2018	1002	3.90
203	4	"Episode 4"	October 28, 2018	1004	3.26
204	5	"Episode 5"	November 18, 2018	1006	3.51
205	6	"Episode 6"	November 25, 2018	1007	3.48
206	7	"Episode 7"	December 2, 2018	1012	3.44
207	8	"Episode 8"	December 9, 2018	1005	3.40
208	9	"Episode 9"	January 6, 2019	1008	3.70
209	10	"Episode 10"	January 13, 2019	923	4.31
210	11	"Episode 11"	January 20, 2019	1010	2.82
211	12	"Episode 12"	January 27, 2019	1011	4.45
212	13	"Episode 13"	January 27, 2019	1009	3.79
213	14	"Episode 14"	March 3, 2019	1016	4.13
214	15	"Episode 15"	March 10, 2019	1015	3.75
215	16	"Episode 16"	March 17, 2019	1013	3.77
216	17	"Episode 17"	March 24, 2019	1014	3.80
217	18	"Episode 18"	April 7, 2019	1018	3.70
218	19	"Episode 19"	April 14, 2019	1017	3.80
219	20	"Episode 20"	April 21, 2019	1019	3.82
220	21	"Episode 21"	April 28, 2019	1020	4.06
221	22	"Episode 22"	May 5, 2019	1021	3.62
222	23	"Episode 23"	May 12, 2019	1022	3.87

=== Season 11 (2019–20) ===
Guest sharks this season include Katrina Lake, founder and CEO of Stitch Fix; Daniel Lubetzky, founder and CEO of Kind; tennis player Maria Sharapova; and Anne Wojcicki, CEO and co-founder of 23andMe. Recurring Sharks include Rohan Oza and Matt Higgins.

No. overall	No. in season	Title	Original release date	Prod. code	U.S. viewers (millions)
223	1	"Episode 1"	September 29, 2019	1101	3.82
224	2	"Episode 2"	October 6, 2019	1102	3.84
225	3	"Episode 3"	October 13, 2019	1104	3.56
226	4	"Episode 4"	October 20, 2019	1105	3.28
227	5	"Episode 5"	October 27, 2019	1103	2.89
228	6	"Episode 6"	November 3, 2019	1107	3.44
229	7	"Episode 7"	November 10, 2019	1109	3.51
230	8	"Episode 8"	November 17, 2019	1111	3.30
231	9	"Episode 9"	December 1, 2019	1110	2.92
232	10	"Episode 10"	January 5, 2020	1108	2.85
233	11	"Episode 11"	January 12, 2020	1112	2.75
234	12	"Episode 12"	January 19, 2020	1115	2.72
235	13	"Episode 13"	February 28, 2020	1113	4.14
236	14	"Episode 14"	March 6, 2020	1106	4.34
237	15	"Episode 15"	March 13, 2020	1118	4.72
238	16	"Episode 16"	March 20, 2020	1117	5.99
239	17	"Episode 17"	March 27, 2020	1116	5.27
240	18	"Episode 18"	April 3, 2020	1119	5.19
241	19	"Episode 19"	April 10, 2020	1120	4.83
242	20	"Episode 20"	May 1, 2020	1121	4.82
243	21	"Episode 21"	May 6, 2020	1114	2.39
244	22	"Episode 22"	May 8, 2020	1123	4.55
245	23	"Episode 23"	May 13, 2020	1122	2.27
246	24	"Episode 24"	May 15, 2020	1124	4.55

=== Season 12 (2020–21) ===
Guest sharks this season include Blake Mycoskie, founder of TOMS and co-founder of Madefor, and Kendra Scott, founder and CEO of Kendra Scott LLC. Returning guest Sharks include Alex Rodriguez, baseball player and founder and CEO of A-Rod Corp, and Daniel Lubetzky, founder and executive chairman of Kind.

No. overall	No. in season	Title	Original release date	Prod. code	U.S. viewers (millions)
247	1	"Episode 1"	October 16, 2020	1201	4.03
248	2	"Episode 2"	October 23, 2020	1202	3.90
249	3	"Episode 3"	October 30, 2020	1203	4.42
250	4	"Episode 4"	November 6, 2020	1205	2.31
251	5	"Episode 5"	November 13, 2020	1204	4.55
252	6	"Episode 6"	November 20, 2020	1206	4.29
253	7	"Episode 7"	December 4, 2020	1207	4.06
254	8	"Episode 8"	December 11, 2020	1125	3.98
255	9	"Episode 9"	January 8, 2021	1210	4.68
256	10	"Episode 10"	January 15, 2021	1211	4.39
257	11	"Episode 11"	January 22, 2021	1213	4.20
258	12	"Episode 12"	February 5, 2021	1208	4.68
259	13	"Episode 13"	February 12, 2021	1209	4.38
260	14	"Episode 14"	February 19, 2021	1214	4.64
261	15	"Episode 15"	February 26, 2021	1212	4.60
262	16	"Episode 16"	March 5, 2021	1217	4.62
263	17	"Episode 17"	March 12, 2021	1216	4.08
264	18	"Episode 18"	March 26, 2021	1219	4.02
265	19	"Episode 19"	April 2, 2021	1220	3.88
266	20	"Episode 20"	April 9, 2021	1215	4.31
267	21	"Episode 21"	April 16, 2021	1218	4.07
268	22	"Episode 22"	April 23, 2021	1224	4.13
269	23	"Episode 23"	May 7, 2021	1223	3.61
270	24	"Episode 24"	May 14, 2021	1221	3.60
271	25	"Episode 25"	May 21, 2021	1222	3.55

=== Season 13 (2021–22) ===
Guest sharks this season include Emma Grede, CEO and co-founder of Good American and founding partner of Skims; actor and comedian Kevin Hart; Peter Jones, dragon on Dragons' Den; Daniel Lubetzky, founder and executive chairman of Kind; and Nirav Tolia, co-founder of Nextdoor.

No. overall	No. in season	Title	Original release date	Prod. code	U.S. viewers (millions)
272	1	"Episode 1"	October 8, 2021	1301	3.72
273	2	"Episode 2"	October 15, 2021	1302	3.58
274	3	"Episode 3"	October 22, 2021	1304	3.55
275	4	"Episode 4"	October 29, 2021	1303	3.80
276	5	"Episode 5"	November 5, 2021	1306	3.95
277	6	"Episode 6"	November 12, 2021	1307	3.58
278	7	"Episode 7"	November 19, 2021	1310	4.34
279	8	"Episode 8"	December 10, 2021	1308	3.57
280	9	"Episode 9"	December 17, 2021	1311	3.67
281	10	"Episode 10"	January 7, 2022	1312	4.59
282	11	"Episode 11"	January 14, 2022	1309	3.85
283	12	"Episode 12"	January 21, 2022	1305	4.20
284	13	"Episode 13"	January 28, 2022	1314	3.90
285	14	"Episode 14"	February 25, 2022	1315	3.45
286	15	"Episode 15"	March 11, 2022	1317	3.55
287	16	"Episode 16"	March 18, 2022	1320	3.43
288	17	"Episode 17"	March 25, 2022	1316	3.43
289	18	"Episode 18"	April 1, 2022	1318	3.50
290	19	"Episode 19"	April 8, 2022	1321	3.76
291	20	"Episode 20"	April 15, 2022	1319	3.74
292	21	"Episode 21"	May 2, 2022	1322	3.56
293	22	"Episode 22"	May 6, 2022	1323	3.62
294	23	"Episode 23"	May 13, 2022	1324	3.34
295	24	"Episode 24"	May 20, 2022	1313	3.59

=== Season 14 (2022–23) ===
Guest sharks this season include Emma Grede, CEO and co-founder of Good American and founding partner of Skims; Gwyneth Paltrow, actress and founder of goop; Peter Jones, dragon on Dragons' Den; Daniel Lubetzky, founder and executive chairman of Kind; Kendra Scott, founder and CEO of Kendra Scott LLC; and Tony Xu, CEO and co-founder of DoorDash.

No. overall	No. in season	Title	Original release date	Prod. code	U.S. viewers (millions)
296	1	"Shark Tank LIVE!"	September 23, 2022	1401	3.79
297	2	"Episode 2"	September 30, 2022	1402	3.18
298	3	"Episode 3"	October 7, 2022	1403	3.44
299	4	"Episode 4"	October 14, 2022	1404	3.44
300	5	"Episode 5"	October 21, 2022	1405	3.34
301	6	"Episode 6"	November 11, 2022	1408	3.61
302	7	"Episode 7"	November 18, 2022	1407	3.91
303	8	"Episode 8"	December 2, 2022	1406	3.46
304	9	"Episode 9"	December 9, 2022	1409	3.65
305	10	"Episode 10"	January 6, 2023	1410	4.01
306	11	"Episode 11"	January 13, 2023	1411	4.04
307	12	"Episode 12"	January 20, 2023	1412	3.98
308	13	"Episode 13"	January 27, 2023	1413	4.22
309	14	"Episode 14"	February 17, 2023	1414	3.91
310	15	"Episode 15"	March 3, 2023	1416	3.74
311	16	"Episode 16"	March 10, 2023	1419	3.59
312	17	"Episode 17"	March 17, 2023	1421	3.51
313	18	"Episode 18"	March 31, 2023	1415	3.29
314	19	"Episode 19"	April 7, 2023	1420	3.76
315	20	"Episode 20"	April 14, 2023	1417	3.24
316	21	"Episode 21"	May 5, 2023	1418	3.21
317	22	"Episode 22"	May 19, 2023	1422	3.35

=== Season 15 (2023–24) ===
In addition to Grede and Lubetzky returning, scheduled guest Sharks for season 15 include Fanatics CEO Michael Rubin, Sprinkles Cupcakes founder Candace Nelson, and film producer Jason Blum.

No. overall	No. in season	Title	Original release date	Prod. code	U.S. viewers (millions)
318	1	"Episode 1"	September 29, 2023	1501	3.47
319	2	"Episode 2"	October 6, 2023	1503	3.60
320	3	"Episode 3"	October 13, 2023	1502	3.33
321	4	"Episode 4"	October 20, 2023	1505	2.93
322	5	"Episode 5"	October 27, 2023	1506	2.94
323	6	"Episode 6"	November 3, 2023	1507	3.47
324	7	"Episode 7"	November 17, 2023	1504	3.36
325	8	"Episode 8"	December 8, 2023	1510	3.28
326	9	"Episode 9"	December 15, 2023	1509	3.27
327	10	"Episode 10"	January 12, 2024	1511	3.62
328	11	"Episode 11"	January 19, 2024	1514	3.88
329	12	"Episode 12"	January 26, 2024	1508	3.83
330	13	"Episode 13"	February 2, 2024	1513	3.45
331	14	"Episode 14"	February 16, 2024	1512	3.20
332	15	"Episode 15"	February 23, 2024	1516	3.52
333	16	"Episode 16"	March 1, 2024	1517	3.12
334	17	"Episode 17"	March 8, 2024	1515	3.13
335	18	"Episode 18"	March 15, 2024	1518	3.02
336	19	"Episode 19"	April 5, 2024	1519	3.01
337	20	"Episode 20"	April 12, 2024	1520	2.96
338	21	"Episode 21"	April 19, 2024	1521	3.02
339	22	"Episode 22"	May 3, 2024	1522	2.74

=== Season 16 (2024–25) ===
After appearing as a guest shark, Daniel Lubetzky has been promoted to one of the main sharks. This is Mark Cuban's last season as a main shark. Guest Sharks include the co-founder of IT Cosmetics Jamie Kern Lima, Raising Cane's founder Todd Graves, venture capitalist, and limited partner of the Atlanta Falcons Rashaun L. Williams and returning guest shark Kendra Scott.

No. overall	No. in season	Title	Original release date	Prod. code	U.S. viewers (millions)
340	1	"Episode 1"	October 18, 2024	1601	2.34
341	2	"Episode 2"	October 25, 2024	1603	2.44
342	3	"Episode 3"	November 1, 2024	1605	2.61
343	4	"Episode 4"	November 8, 2024	1606	2.92
344	5	"Episode 5"	November 15, 2024	1611	2.69
345	6	"Episode 6"	November 22, 2024	1604	2.91
346	7	"Episode 7"	December 13, 2024	1610	2.88
347	8	"Episode 8"	January 17, 2025	1608	2.90
348	9	"Episode 9"	January 24, 2025	1612	3.20
349	10	"Episode 10"	January 31, 2025	1607	3.00
350	11	"Episode 11"	February 7, 2025	1615	3.23
351	12	"Episode 12"	March 7, 2025	1614	2.96
352	13	"Episode 13"	March 14, 2025	1613	2.93
353	14	"Episode 14"	March 21, 2025	1602	2.79
354	15	"Episode 15"	April 4, 2025	1616	2.50
355	16	"Episode 16"	April 11, 2025	1619	2.73
356	17	"Episode 17"	April 18, 2025	1618	2.92
357	18	"Episode 18"	May 2, 2025	1609	2.75
358	19	"Episode 19"	May 9, 2025	1617	2.60
359	20	"Episode 20"	May 16, 2025	1620	2.88

=== Season 17 (2025–26) ===
No. overall	No. in season	Title	Original release date	Prod. code	U.S. viewers (millions)
360	1	"Big Sock Energy: Comedian Pete Davidson Is in the Tank"	September 24, 2025	1703	1.88
361	2	"Michael Strahan Brings His Business Game to the Tank"	October 1, 2025	1701	1.60
362	3	"First Power Couple: Chip and Joanna Gaines Dive-in"	October 8, 2025	1702	1.61
363	4	"Startup Legend Alexis Ohanian Makes His Mark"	October 22, 2025	1704	1.57
364	5	"History Is Made: Allison Ellsworth Returns"	November 5, 2025	1705	1.37
365	6	"Revolutionizing Sound: 3D Printed Instruments Shake Up the Music Biz"	November 12, 2025	1707	1.39
366	7	"Cash or Coal?: The Sharks Get Into the Holiday Spirit with Festive Pitches & Products"	December 10, 2025	1708	1.92
367	8	"Urine for a Surprise: Would NFL Legend Michael Strahan Use This Personal Product in Public?"	January 7, 2026	1709	1.60
368	9	"5 Sharks and a Baby: Can This New Invention Provide Sleep for Newborns and Their Parents?"	January 14, 2026	1710	N/A
369	10	"Dating in the Wild: Will the Sharks Say Yes to a Unique Dating App? Alexis Ohanian Returns"	January 21, 2026	1711	N/A
370	11	"Snooze You Lose: Do the Sharks Wake Up to this Ingenious New Dorm Bed? Chip & Joanna Gaines Return to the Tank"	January 28, 2026	1713	N/A
371	12	"New Guest Shark: Fawn Weaver, Founder of One of the Fastest Growing Premium Whiskeys Joins the Tank!"	March 4, 2026	1706	N/A
372	13	"Pop or Fizzle? Will Guest Shark, Beverage Billionaire Allison Ellsworth Take a Chance on a Soda Newbie?"	March 11, 2026	1712	N/A
373	14	"Girl Power: Will Guest Shark, Beverage Mogul Fawn Weaver, Buy Into a Beer Made for Women?"	March 18, 2026	1717	N/A
374	15	"Good Hang!: Mark Cuban's Back with an Exciting Update. Plus, Will a Picture-Hanging Invention Hook a Shark?"	March 25, 2026	1714	N/A
375	16	"Shark ATTACK: The Sharks Battle Over a Game-Changer Product for Athletes. WHO WINS?"	April 8, 2026 (Note: This episode was scheduled to air on April 1, 2026, but was replaced by a repeat of "Dating in the Wild: Will the Sharks Say Yes to a Unique Dating App? Alexis Ohanian Returns", due to a presidential address by President Donald Trump.)	1716	N/A
376	17	"Million Dollar Offer: See Which Shark Makes a Million Dollar Offer for a Never-Before-Seen Idea!"	April 15, 2026	1715	N/A
377	18	"Season Finale: Which Shark Will Get a Slice of a Unique Family Based Pizza Business? Plus an Update on Pete Davidson's Sock Company."	April 22, 2026	1718	N/A

=== Season 18 (2026) ===
No. overall	No. in season	Title	Original release date	Prod. code	U.S. viewers (millions)
378	1	"Beast Mode"	September 30, 2026	1801	1.91
379	2	"Favorite Daughters"	September 30, 2026	1802	1.68
380	3	"Diary of a Shark"	October 7, 2026	1803	TBD
381	4	"The Mindy Project"	October 14, 2026	1804	TBD
382	5	"I Smell A Rat"	October 28, 2026	1805	TBD
383	6	"Kevin in a Head Lock"	November 4, 2026	1806	TBD
384	7	"Hoop Dreams"	November 11, 2026	1807	TBD
