= Herjavec =

Herjavec (/hərˈdʒɑːvɛk/; Croatian: [xěrjaːʋet͡s]) is a Slovenian surname that may refer to

- Kym Herjavec (born 1976), Australian ballroom dancer and television performer
- Robert Herjavec (born 1962), Croatian-Canadian businessman, investor, and television personality

The last name is found in Croatia next to the Slovenian border but it’s actually Slovenian.

== See also ==
- Stadion Varteks, a football stadium in Varaždin, Croatia, that locals have nicknamed for former team president Anđelko Herjavec (1958–2001)
