= John Moffitt (director) =

American television director

John Craig Moffitt is an American television director who is best known for his work on Mr. Show.

He is a graduate of Dartmouth College.

Moffitt won an Emmy Award in 1977 for his work in the category of Outstanding Achievement in Coverage of Special Events - Individuals for the 28th Primetime Emmy Awards.

== Filmography ==
- Talking Funny (TV movie) 2011
- Colin Quinn: Long Story Short (TV movie) 2011
- Ricky Gervais: Out of England 2 - The Stand-Up Special (TV documentary) 2010
- Tracy Morgan: Black and Blue (TV movie) 2010
- Bill Maher: But I'm Not Wrong (TV movie) 2010
- Jim Jefferies: I Swear to God (TV movie) 2009
- Cheech & Chong: Roasted (TV special) 2009
- Ricky Gervais: Out of England - The Stand-Up Special (TV documentary) 2008
- Dana Carvey: Squatting Monkeys Tell No Lies (TV movie) 2008
- Bill Maher: The Decider (TV movie) 2007
- The Hollow Men (TV series) 2005
- Bill Maher: Victory Begins at Home (TV movie) 2003
- Mr. Show with Bob and David (TV series) 1995-1998
- Mr. Show and the Incredible, Fantastical News Report (TV movie) 1998
- Mr. Vegas All-Night Party Starring Drew Carey (TV movie) 1997
- Bill Maher: The Golden Goose Special (TV movie) 1997
- Saturday Night Special (TV series) 1996
- Mr. Show with Bob and David: Fantastic Newness (TV movie) 1996
- Bill Maher: Stuff That Struck Me Funny (TV movie) 1995
- 50 Years of Soaps: An All-Star Celebration (TV movie) 1995
- One Night Stand (TV series) 1992
- Say What? (TV movie) 1992
- Penn & Teller: Don't Try This at Home! (TV movie) 1990
- 50 Years of Television: A Golden Celebration (TV documentary) 1989
- Not Necessarily the News (TV series) 1984-1988
- Live! From London (TV special)
- Love at Stake 1987
- I Comic Relief (TV special) 1986
- Catch a Rising Star's 10th Anniversary (TV special) 1982
- Fridays (TV series) 1980-1982
- The 31st Annual Emmy Awards (TV special) 1979
- Ringling Bros, Barnum and Bailey Circus Special (TV movie) 1979
- The Captain and Tennille in Hawaii (TV special) 1978
- The Richard Pryor Show (TV series) 1977
- The Richard Pryor Special? (TV movie) 1977
- The 4th Annual American Music Awards (TV special) 1977
- Van Dyke and Company (TV series) 1976
- The 28th Annual Primetime Emmy Awards (TV special) 1976
- The Second Annual Comedy Awards (TV movie) 1976
- Wide World Mystery (TV series) 1975
- The Werewolf of Woodstock 1975
- Andy Williams Presents (TV movie) 1974
- Chicago in the Rockies (ABC TV Special) Dick Clark Productions
- Don't Call Me Mama Anymore (TV special) 1973
- The Burns and Schreiber Comedy Hour (TV series) 1973
- Roberta Flack: The First Time Ever (TV movie) 1973
- Mitzi... The First Time (TV movie) 1973
- The Ice Palace (TV series) 1971
- The Great Santa Claus Switch (TV movie) 1970
- Our Place (TV series) 1967
- The Ed Sullivan Show (TV series) 1948–1971 (1068 episodes)
