= Mosaic crochet =

Crochet technique

Overlay mosaic crochet piece (front)

Mosaic crochet is a colorwork technique that uses two or more colors to create graphic patterns. Multicolored motifs are achieved by the strategic use of overlapping stitches in various colors.

Unlike other colorwork techniques, such as tapestry crochet, mosaic crochet typically uses only one color per row. Overlaying colors of yarn form the pattern through specific placement of tall stitches, usually double crochets or treble crochet stitches. Single crochet stitches serve as the relief from tall stitches, making the design fully visible.

== History ==
Mosaic crochet most likely evolved from earlier colorwork techniques, such as colorwork knitting. The motifs of inset and overlay crochet suggest influences from textile designs, sand mandalas and tile mosaic art.

This type of colorwork crochet may have originated from mosaic knitting. This term was coined by Barbara Walker and used in her pattern book of the same title, published in 1976. The book features graphs, which would later be reinterpreted by crocheters and translated to crochet.

One of the designers who helped popularize mosaic crochet was Lily Chin, whose instructional DVDs were popularized by the Interweave magazine. Since then many designers mastered this technique and have helped popularize the style through patterns and tutorials shared online. Notable designers include Alexis Sixel of Sixel Design, Erin Toews of Juniper and Oakes, and Abi of Get Yer Hook On.

== Technique ==
In mosaic crochet, each row is worked in a single color. The patterns are formed by dropping stitches down into previous rows. The most common stitches used include single crochet, double crochet, treble crochet and chain stitches.

There are two main types of mosaic crochet:

Overlay mosaic crochet (closed backside)

Inset mosaic crochet is the most common mosaic crochet technique, also referred to as standard mosaic crochet. This method uses one color for two rows at a time, which allows for the yarn to be carried on the sides without cutting it. It is often called "the cleaner version", as it greatly reduces the number of loose yarn ends. The long stitches are worked in the chain spaces, creating a lighter fabric.

In overlay mosaic crochet, also called single-row mosaic crochet, colors change every row. Contrary to inset mosaic crochet, this method is worked on the right side of fabric only. This method places stitches (usually single crochets) in the back loop only, leaving the front loops free. These become “anchor points” for tall crochet stitches, which then are placed on top, creating geometric patterns. This method allows for the tall stitches to be placed diagonally. The main disadvantage of this technique is a large number of yarn ends on each side, which is the result of cutting the yarn and attaching a new color after each row.

The basic term “mosaic crochet” is sometimes used in relation to inset mosaic technique, while overlay mosaic is mentioned as a newer, distinctly different method.

Mosaic crochet requires standard crochet tools, including:

- Crochet hooks (size appropriate for yarn)
- Yarn (usually medium-weight or DK for clear stitch definition)
- Stitch markers and row counters (optional)

Although mosaic crochet is considered an advanced technique, it uses basic crochet stitches and only one color per row. It is achievable for beginners to master, but it requires a lot of focus and the ability to understand and follow mosaic crochet charts.

== Charts ==
Contrary to other crochet techniques, mosaic crochet relies heavily on charts instead of written patterns. Those schematics are much easier to follow and help visualize the colorwork pattern. However, mosaic charts show the colors of stitches, not their type. In some cases, one has to follow two charts at once - the color chart and the stitch chart, or a color chart and a written pattern. Some charts may represent only a segment, which is meant to be repeated to complete a motif.

Having grown from mosaic knitting, both crafts use the same type of chart. In fact, mosaic charts can be adapted for knitting, mosaic crochet, tapestry crochet, and Tunisian crochet. Mosaic crochet charts often include X symbol to indicate where longer stitches should be placed to create the overlay effect.

Mosaic crochet charts look different than standard crochet diagrams. The former shows only the colorwork pattern, while the latter depicts the type of stitch one should use. Many crocheters use graph paper or software to design custom charts.
