= The Woobles =

American crochet kit brand

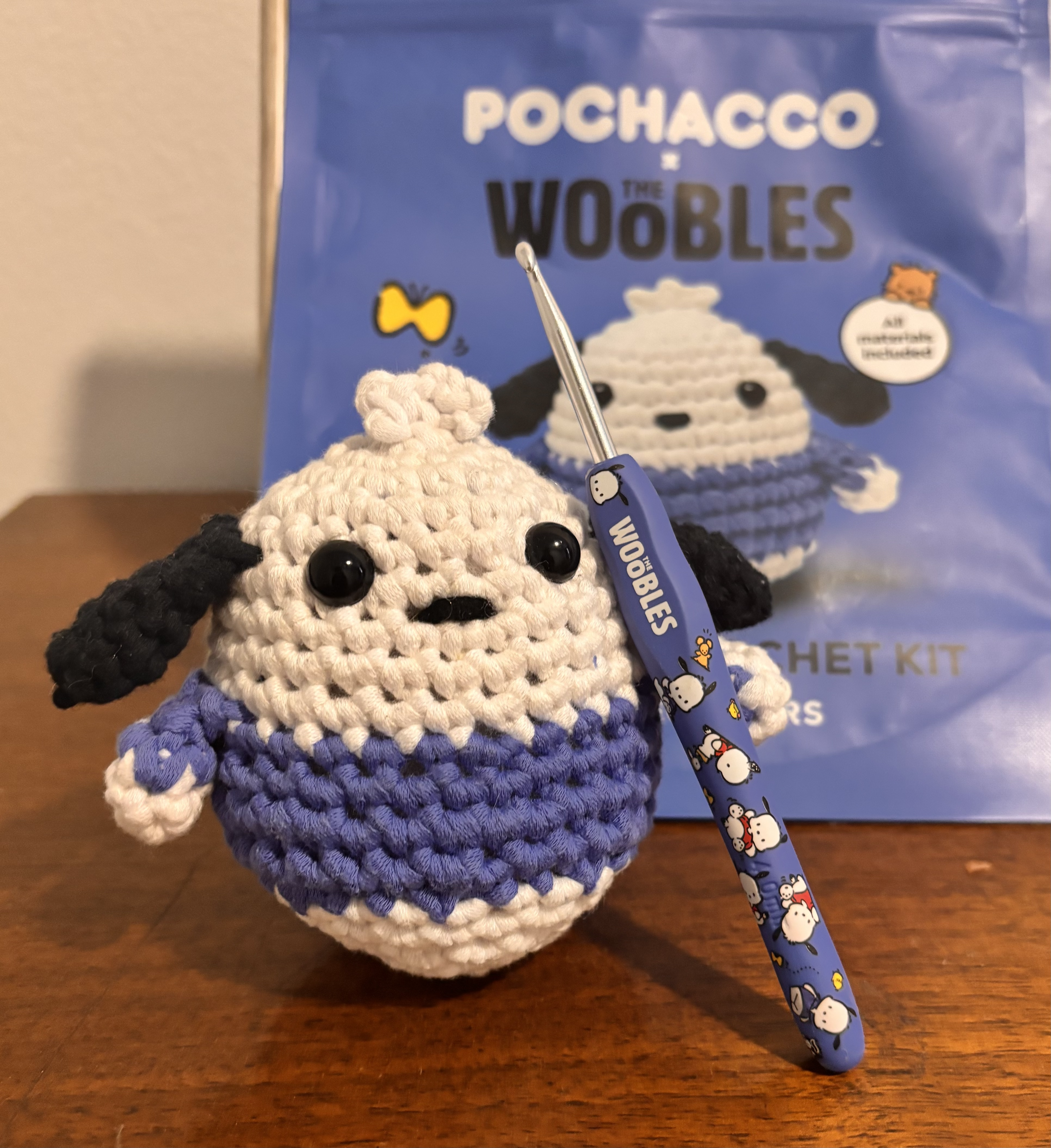
- An amigurumi version of the character "Pochacco" made using a Sanrio Woobles kit
- Type: Private
- Industry: Fiber art
- Founded: 2020; 6 years ago
- Founders: Justine Tiu and Adrian Zhang
- Website: thewoobles.com

The Woobles is an American amigurumi crochet kit company founded in 2020 by Justine Tiu and Adrian Zhang.

The kits range from beginner to intermediate and come pre-started with stitch markers. Each kit comes with a video tutorial.

== History ==
Tiu and Zhang, a married couple, quit their jobs at Google and Deutsche Bank, respectively, in 2018. After feeling unfulfilled by corporate work, the pair pivoted to entrepreneurship and tested multiple unsuccessful business ventures. Tiu launched a crochet pattern store on Etsy in 2020, and it took off due to an increased interest in crafting during the COVID-19 pandemic and word of mouth. Tiu and Zhang assembled the kits themselves, with help from their parents.

The company received a boost in sales after appearing on Shark Tank in 2022. The deal with Mark Cuban didn't close after the show.

== Kits ==
Kits from The Woobles come with detailed videos divided into bite-sized steps. Tiu, who previously led user experience at Google Classroom, views The Woobles as an education company due to its digital learning platform.

The kits come pre-started with stitch markers and a custom-made beginner yarn that is designed not to fray.

Standard kits produce animals like foxes, penguins, and bunnies. The Woobles has also collaborated with brands like Sanrio, Minecraft, and Peanuts to produce limited-edition kits.

== Reception ==
The Woobles has received positive reviews and appeared on gift guides as a beginner-friendly introduction to crochet.

In a review for Wirecutter, Kase Wickman wrote that the starter kits' $30 price point is "likely to seem high for the materials included" to experienced crocheters.
