= Wicked Good Cupcakes =

Boston-based cupcake bakery

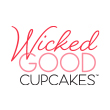
- Industry: Baking
- Founded: 2011
- Founders: Tracey Noonan, Danielle Descroches
- Headquarters: Cohasset, Massachusetts
- Products: Cupcakes
- Website: www.wickedgoodcupcakes.com

Wicked Good Cupcakes is a Boston-based cupcake bakery that sells cupcakes in jars both in-store and online.

== History ==
Wicked Good Cupcakes was formed by mother and daughter Tracey Noonan and Danielle Desroches. After taking a cake decorating class, they began posting photos of their baking online. Friends and family requested the product and Noonan and Descroches put the cupcakes in a jar in order to ship them. The company opened a store in 2011 in Cohasset.

In 2011, someone with a Wicked Good Cupcake was stopped by the TSA in Boston. The cupcake was confiscated due to the icing being considered more than the 3-ounce limit for liquids. The incident sparked an increase in sales and publicity for the company.

Wicked Good Cupcakes appeared on Season 4 of Shark Tank where it received an investment from Kevin O'Leary of $75,000 in exchange for royalties. O'Leary received $1 for every cupcake sold until his investment was repaid, and then $0.45 for every cupcake thereafter.

In 2021, Wicked Good Cupcakes was purchased by the Hickory Farms family of gourmet food gifts.
