= Summer sausage =

Sausages that can be kept without refrigeration

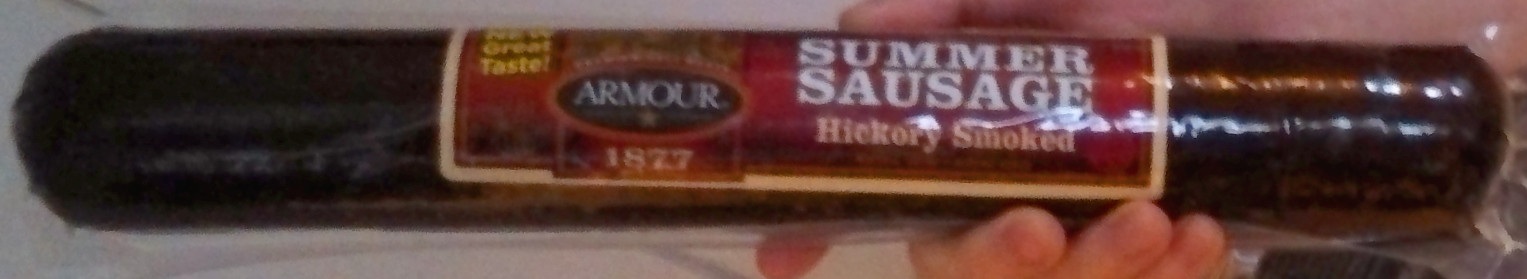
A larger summer sausage

Summer sausage is an American term for a sausage that can be kept without refrigeration until opened. Summer sausage is made of beef, pork, or sometimes venison. Summer sausage is fermented, and can be dried or smoked, and while curing ingredients vary significantly, curing salt is almost always used. Seasonings may include mustard seeds, black pepper, garlic salt, or sugar. Fermentation of summer sausage lowers pH to slow bacterial growth and give a longer shelf life, causing a tangy taste. Summer sausages are often included in gift baskets sold by American online and mail order retailers like Harry & David, Wisconsin Cheeseman and Hickory Farms. Armour has produced summer sausage for over 100 years.

Historically, summer sausage predated refrigeration and referred to meats that could be consumed "in the summer months" when high temperatures would cause fresh meats to spoil. For this reason, they became popular gifts during the winter holidays, especially in German-American settler communities.

== See also ==
- Cervelat
- Embutido
- List of smoked foods
- Salami
- Saucisson
- Thuringer
