= Talkin' Funny =

- Genre: Call-in comedy show
- Created by: Steve Gadlin; Paul Luikart
- Presented by: Steve Gadlin; Paul Luikart
- Starring: Steve Gadlin; Paul Luikart
- Country of origin: United States
- No. of seasons: 9
- No. of episodes: 126

Production
- Camera setup: Mounted
- Running time: Approx. 25 min
- Production company: Blewt! Productions

Original release
- Network: CAN21
- Release: October 4, 2005 – June 1, 2021

Talkin' Funny is a live call-in television show hosted by international comedians Sasha and The Noob. Talkin' Funny had its original run on Chicago Public-access television cable TV channel CAN21. The TV show first aired on October 4, 2005, and ran for 6 seasons, airing its final episode on CAN21 on June 29, 2009. It aired on Monday nights at 7:30 p.m. in the Chicago area.

In 2020, amid stay-at-home orders due to the COVID-19 pandemic, the hosts relaunched the call-in show as Talkin' Funny 2020 on their YouTube channel. The first episode of Talkin' Funny 2020 streamed live on April 14, 2020, with special guest Jordan Klepper. All three participants appeared remotely by video chat.

Sasha and The Noob previously appeared in the live game show Don't Spit the Water at the Playground Theater.

In season 2, episode 13, callers began flushing the toilet on the phone. This became a monumental moment in the history of Talkin' Funny.

== Format ==
The show begins with the character of The Noob blowing his slide whistle. Sasha then takes calls from viewers. Viewers ask questions, make comments, scream, curse, tell jokes, play simple games (such as their trademark "Hide the Peanut") or may interact with paper characters put in front of a desk-mounted camera by Sasha. A guest, usually someone in the Chicago comedy community, then comes on. Viewers sometimes ask questions, but often ignore the guest entirely. Calls then continue until the show's 25 minutes are up, with an often hasty slide whistle ending.

== Characters ==
Sasha

- Sasha is played by Steve Gadlin, a Chicago comedian and entrepreneur known for his business I Want to Draw a Cat for You. He is an international comedian, and is the main voice of the show. He is almost always seen wearing a red vest; often stares, mouth agape, due to an inability to control his bowels.

The Noob

- The Noob is played by Paul Luikart. The origin of The Noob's name is actually completely independent of the online gaming community that popularized it. He rarely speaks, because when he was a little boy, he watched his father kill his mother, and instead communicates by slide whistle. In the first episode of Talkin' Funny 2020, he did not have access to a slide whistle, so instead played a recorder.

Army

- Army is a blue octopus on a sheet of paper. He only says "BLUBUBLUBLUBUBUBUBLU" and shakes uncontrollably.

Ned Littletoes

- Ned is a pink hat mustache sporting cowboy from the old west. He also doubles as the phone screener.

The Laugh Cougar

- Never actually seen on screen, only a drawn likeness of the laugh cougar. Tells jokes which usually end in the punchline "Wilfred Brimly"

Mr. Sloat

- Mr. Sloat is a shady character that has appeared in two episodes, Season 3 episodes 8 and 13. He is alleged to be involved in some illegal activities and is labeled a terrorist by Governor Kevin.

Steve

- Steve has only appeared in one episode, "Talkin' Seriously," Season 2 Episode 9.

Paul

- Paul has appeared in Season 2 Episodes 9 and 11, Season 3 Episode 4, as well as Season 4 Episode 4.

Diabolical Dina

- Kidnapped The Noob and trapped him into the comic book dimension in Season 4 Episode 10.

Professor Hopchump

- Expert in dimensions. Trapped in the comic book dimension and eaten by Diabolical Dina in Season 4 Episode 11.

== Prank Calling ==
The show is set up in such a fashion that it almost invites viewers to 'prank call' the show. One aspect of the appeal of the show is the haphazard and candid way Sasha and The Noob try to cover up explicit and graphic language spoken by the callers to the duo, usually a hasty cut-off of the caller in the middle of his or her cursing rant, or, if the language is suggestive but not explicit, the hosts' deliberate skewing of the meaning of the language (i.e. pootietang).

One frequent gag is the 'flush-gag', where a caller attempts to flush their toilet in earshot of the phone, doing so at what they believe is the least expected moment possible. It has become custom as of late for the hosts to then eat sour candies.

== Frequent Callers ==
David

- David calls very often, and is frequently incomprehensible. Speaks to the television, not the phone, creating a 7-second delay in his answers. Often feuds with Caller Bill, but it is clear that he longs for his touch.

Mel

- Mel has a southern accent and is bizarrely enthusiastic.

Buddy Bill & His Wife Joani

- Buddy Bill is usually the caller, with his wife heard in the background.... She calls in once in a while but makes Bill watch the show on a black and white TV in the basement while she watches girly shows on the big TV upstairs.

Governor Kevin

- Governor Kevin is in high school, and is not associated with Governor Kevin from Teamo Supremo

Governor Kevin's Little Sister

- Governor Kevin's little sister is loud and annoying, she also helped Kevin win the election by saying "Kevin, Kevin, Kevin, Kevin, Kevin!"

Da Noob's Father

- Da Noob's father is sometimes speaking words, sometimes speaking slidewhistle, but is always pleading for Da Noob's love.

Jessica

- Jessica has a pretty voice.

Joe

- Joe always refers to someone named MaNoob (and once Manure) sitting to Sasha's left. Often asks when "Miss Mia" from "Chic-a-Go-Go" will be a guest. Uses the phrase "pootietang" liberally.

Dead for a Ducat's manager

- Calls in to shamelessly promote his band, Dead for a Ducat. Band member Keegan is another frequent caller.

Bo Cleveland

- Usually calls in to just yell "Baba Booey" and then promptly hangs up.

Sean Hardy

- Orders P-Zone's thinking the show is a Pizza Hut. Sometimes craves Buffalo Wild Wings. Once asked Sasha to go with him to Lake Gaston.
