= Hickory Farms =

American food gift retailer

Hickory Farms, LLC
- Company type: Private
- Industry: Foods
- Founded: 1951
- Founder: Richard Ransom
- Headquarters: Chicago, Illinois. Began in Toledo, Ohio, United States
- Area served: United States, Canada, Puerto Rico
- Key people: CEO - Judy Ransford
- Products: Summer sausages, cheeses, gift baskets
- Number of employees: 500
- Website: hickoryfarms.com

Hickory Farms, LLC is an American food gift retailer with headquarters in Chicago. Richard Ransom established the company in 1951 when he began selling handcrafted cheese at local fairs. By 1959, the company added summer sausage and opened its first retail store in Maumee, Ohio. By 1981, it operated over 1,000 Hickory Farms stores and seasonal kiosks open in the United States and Canada.

In 2000, the company shifted away from year-round mall-based locations to focus on Internet and catalog sales. As a result, the company closed its remaining year-round mall stores. However, the company still operates pop-up stores and kiosks in malls during the holiday season.

In 2017, the company relocated to Chicago, Illinois, from Toledo, Ohio. Its owner, Modjule LLC, is also headquartered in Chicago.

In 2021, Wicked Good Cupcakes was acquired by Hickory Farms. Wicked Good Cupcakes gained popularity in 2013.

In 2022, Hickory Farms appointed Judy Ransford to be the company's CEO. Ransford has served as the company's Chief Marketing Officer and head of e-commerce since 2016. Ransford played a huge role in moving the company to a more modern and digital brand.

Today, Hickory Farms specializes in gift boxes and baskets, wine gifts, chocolates, and charcuterie gifts. Its foods are found in more than 500 pop-up shops and kiosks in retail shopping centers during the holiday season. The company also does multichannel marketing, offering products year-round in different outlets.

== See also ==
- List of food companies
