= Richard Ransom =

American businessman (1919–2016)

- Born: September 13, 1919
- Died: April 11, 2016 (aged 96)
- Known for: founding Hickory Farms

Richard K. Ransom (September 13, 1919 – April 11, 2016) was an American businessman and founder of Hickory Farms.

== Life ==
Ransom graduated from DeVilbiss High School (Toledo, Ohio) in 1938. He served in World War II, at Okinawa. Starting in 1951, he built a specialty foods business, using the technique of "free samples". He sold Hickory Farms to General Host Corporation in 1980.

== Philanthropy ==
He was on the board of the Toledo Zoo and Riverside Hospital. He was board chairman of St. John's Jesuit High School and Academy.
