= Sabin Lomac =

American businessperson

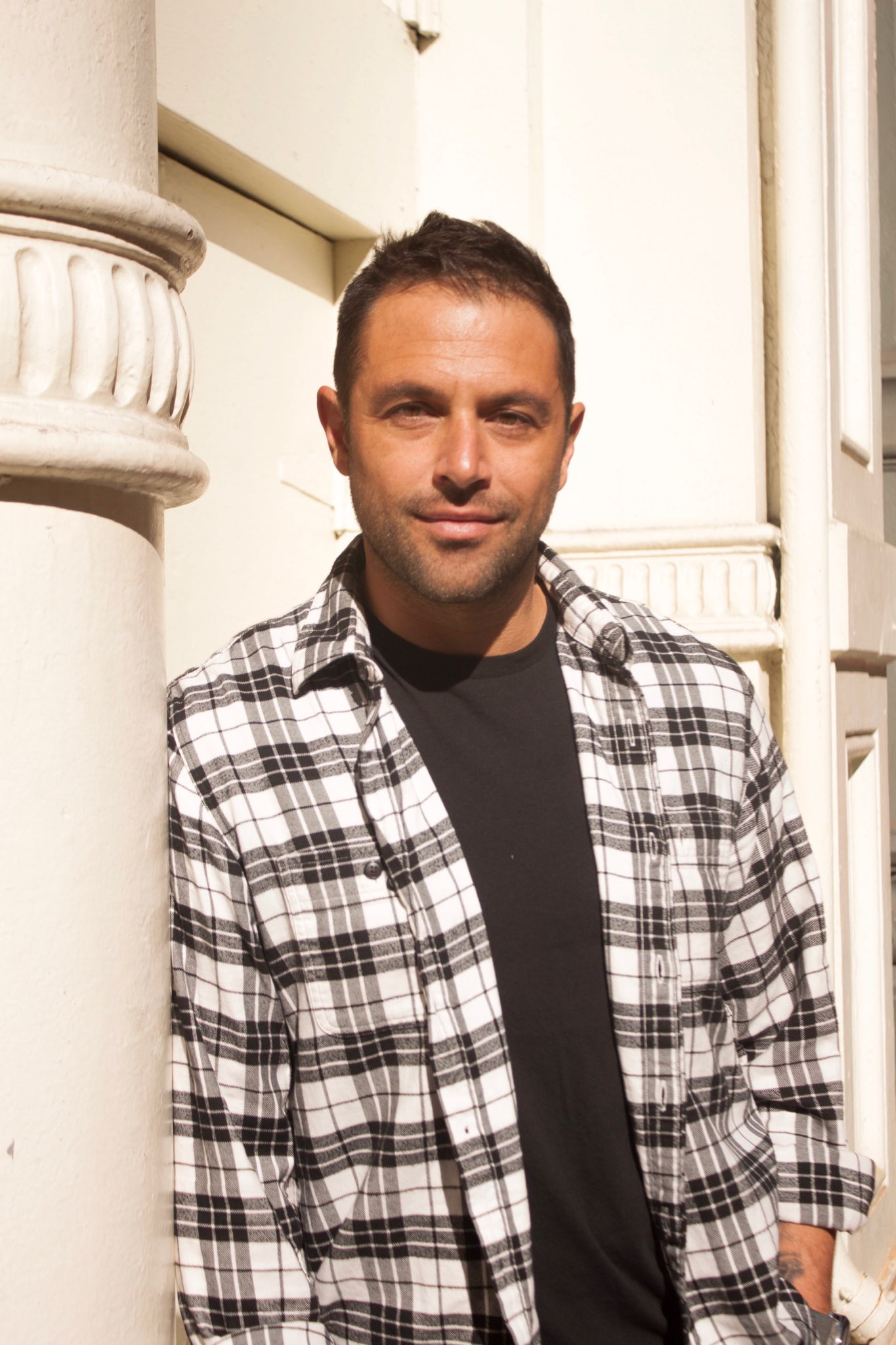
- Born: April 4, 1981 (age 45); San Diego, California, United States
- Education: Hofstra University
- Occupations: Businessperson, actor
- Known for: Co-founder of Cousins Maine Lobster

Sabin Zen Morley Lomac (born April 4, 1981) is an American businessman and co-founder of Cousins Maine Lobster.

== Early life and education ==
Lomac was raised by his mother Jeannie Lomac. Until the age of 18, he lived in Maine. Lomac attended Hofstra University from 1999 to 2003. From 2000 to 2003 he majored in speech communications, rhetorical studies, and race relations. He also worked at Morton's of Chicago as a waiter in Great Neck, NY and Midtown NYC throughout his college.

== Career ==
Lomac has appeared in 15 plays while attending Hofstra. He was also represented by NEXT models during college and appeared in catalogue work for Yahoo, Calvin Klein, and many others. Sabin also appeared on All My Children, Guiding Light, Mad TV as an actor while in college. After obtaining a role on Veronica Mars as an actor and to continue his dream of acting he moved to California.

At last he moved to Los Angeles and began work as an actor but took a job as Realtor at 360 Realty. He managed a team of 10 realtors and carried, at times, over 80 listings.

In 2012 he began Cousins Maine Lobster as a side business idea with his cousin Jim. By 2019, Cousins Maine Lobster had 35 food trucks and 12 restaurants in over 20 US cities, including 3 in Taiwan.

Lomac also created "Cousins For A Cause" 501C3 for philanthropic work with Big Brothers Big Sisters of Los Angeles, which was named National Big Brother of The Year for 2016 from Big Brothers Big Sisters of America. His cousins Maine Lobster has been named in the top 20 most successful Shark Tank businesses.
