= Tapestry crochet =

Type of crochet

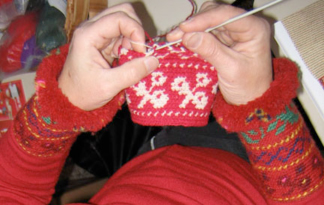
In Finland, yarns are placed to the front and back of the same finger to quickly change colors and the hook is inserted into the back loop.

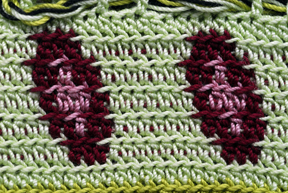
Detail of a bag from Turkey showing half-double crochet stitches done in the back loop. The front loops form a horizontal line across the fabric. The extra color was carried only in the rows where it was needed.

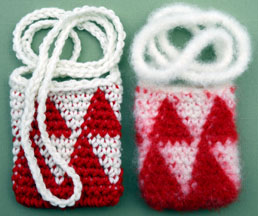
Amulet bags before (on left) and after felting in a washing machine

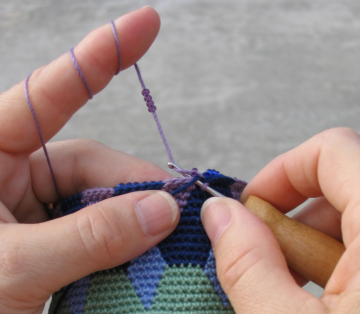
Since the beads fall to the back of the stitches, tapestry crocheted fabric can have beads on one side and colorful motifs on the other. A hook with a handle makes it easier to crochet tight stitches.

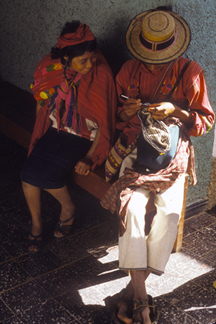
A Maya man from San Juan Atitán, Guatemala, tapestry-crochets a shoulder bag.

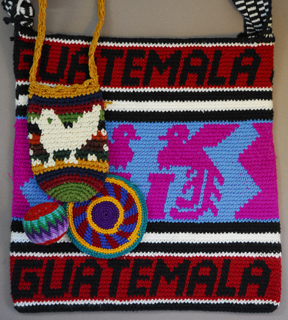
Bags and a hacky sack tapestry crocheted for tourists in Guatemala

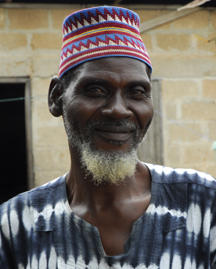
Hat tapestry crocheted and worn in Ghana

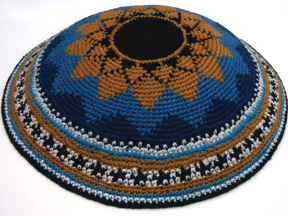
Kippa from Israel with colors carried inside single crochet stitches

Tapestry crochet is sometimes called jacquard crochet, intarsia, mosaic, fair isle, and colorwork, but today these terms usually describe different techniques. Since the yarns are switched back and forth to create motifs, tapestry crochet fabric looks more like it was woven on a loom than crocheted with a hook.

== Methods ==
Just as there are several ways to produce a woven tapestry, so there are different ways to do tapestry crochet. Most tapestry crochet is done with single crochet stitches, but the slip stitch, half double, and double crochet stitches are also used. Yarns not in play are either carried inside the stitches, dropped and picked up when needed (also called intarsia), or they run along the back of the stitches.

Unlike mosaic crochet, where only one color is used per one row, tapestry crochet uses two or more strands of yarn at a time. This allows for switching between colors in the middle of a row or a round.

The crochet hook may be inserted under both top loops or under one loop (also called Fair Isle crochet); colors may be changed before the stitch is completed or afterwards, all of which produce different results. Tight stitches produce a stiff fabric with hidden carried colors, while loose stitches show the carried colors and produce a fabric with drape.

Some fibers may be loosely tapestry crocheted, then felted in a washing machine – resulting in a dense fabric patterned on both sides.

With bead tapestry crochet, beads of the same color are strung onto individual yarns. To produce the motifs, yarns are switched and beads are placed on some or all of the stitches.

== History ==
Maya men in Guatemala tapestry crochet shoulder bags with recognizable regional patterns for local use with single crochet stitches, inserting the hook under both top loops. Both women and men there tapestry crochet bags, hats, and hacky sacks for tourists.

Hats are tapestry crocheted by both men and women in Africa, such as in Ghana. The shape, color, and design can denote social position or ethnic affiliation or may simply be a fashion statement. In order to make the fabric stiffer, extra fibers are sometimes carried along with the yarn or the hat may be starched.

Tapestry crocheted yarmulke (also called kippah) are worn by Jewish men. These skullcaps are usually decorated with either geometric or figurative motifs.

== Bibliography ==
- Norton, Carol. Tapestry Crochet, Dos Tejedoras, 1991, reprinted by Interweave Press, 2004. ISBN 0-932394-15-9.
- Ventura, Carol. More Tapestry Crochet, Cookeville, TN, 2002. ISBN 0-9721253-0-2.
- Ventura, Carol. Bead & Felted Tapestry Crochet, Cookeville, TN, 2006. ISBN 0-9721253-2-9.
