= Cheech & Chong: Roasted =

2008 television special by John Moffitt

- Written by: Michael Ferrucci; Tom Gianas; Jesse Joyce
- Directed by: John Moffitt; Tom Gianas
- Starring: Cheech Marin; Tommy Chong; Brad Garrett
- Country of origin: United States
- Original language: English

Production
- Executive producers: Ben Feigin; Robert Morton
- Running time: 60 minutes

Original release
- Network: TBS
- Release: November 30, 2008

Cheech & Chong: Roasted is a 2008 roast of comedians Cheech & Chong broadcast on TBS.

== The roast ==
On November 30, 2008, Cheech & Chong were honored during a roast special on TBS hosted by Brad Garrett which included other guests, among them Chong's wife. The event was filmed at Caesars Palace in Las Vegas during The Comedy Festival.

== Guests ==
Brad Garrett hosted the event. Guests included Tom Arnold, Shelby Chong, Whitney Cummings, Andy Dick, Greg Giraldo, Penn Jillette, Ralphie May, Geraldo Rivera, Teller, and Wilmer Valderrama.
