= Beyond the Tank =

US television program

- Genre: Reality television
- Starring: Barbara Corcoran; Mark Cuban; Lori Greiner; Robert Herjavec; Daymond John; Kevin O'Leary
- Country of origin: United States
- Original language: English
- No. of seasons: 2
- No. of episodes: 19

Production
- Executive producers: Mark Burnett; Clay Newbill; Leslie Garvin
- Running time: 41–43 minutes
- Production companies: United Artists Media Group (2015); MGM Television (2016); Sony Pictures Television

Original release
- Network: ABC
- Release: May 1, 2015 – June 3, 2016

Related
- Shark Tank

Beyond the Tank is an American reality television companion spin-off series on ABC, which followed up on aspiring entrepreneurs who made business presentations to a panel of potential investors on Shark Tank. The show premiered on May 1, 2015, and was picked up for 10 episodes, but only three episodes aired. It was renewed for a second season on May 7, 2015, which premiered on January 5, 2016, before airing in its regular time slot on January 7, 2016. Additional episodes aired in March 2016 after ABC cancelled Of Kings and Prophets.

== Premise ==
Each episode follows up with entrepreneurs who appeared on Shark Tank. The show does not focus exclusively on successful entrepreneurs; several segments have featured entrepreneurs whose deals with the "Sharks" failed, while others focus on entrepreneurs who did not receive investments.

== Episodes ==
=== Series overview ===
Season	Episodes	Originally released	
Season	Episodes	First released	Last released
1	3	May 1, 2015	May 15, 2015
2	16	January 5, 2016	June 3, 2016

=== Season 1 (2015) ===
No. overall	No. in season	Title	Original release date	Prod. code	U.S. viewers (millions)
1	1	"Episode 1"	May 1, 2015	101	6.38
This episode provides updates on Tipsy Elves, the ugly Christmas sweater company that Robert Herjavec invested in during Season 5; Carter Kostler, a 16-year-old whose idea for a new bottle was rejected by the Sharks in Season 5, and Al "Bubba" Baker also from Season 5, whose de-boned ribs company has Daymond John thinking of pulling out of the deal with a struggle that the company has had.
2	2	"Episode 2"	May 8, 2015	103	5.60
This episode provides updates on The Red Dress Boutique from Season 6 who wants to make a change in their website leaving Mark Cuban unhappy; Ryan's Barkery, a deal made by Barbara Corcoran in Season 4 who since changed their name to Ry's Ruffery and Plated from Season 5, whose deal with Cuban for their meals-at-home business, fell through.
3	3	"Episode 3"	May 15, 2015	102	6.23
This episode provides updates on ChordBuddy, whose deal with Robert Herjavec in Season 3 is endangered as sales decline and he must decide to keep manufacturing local or go overseas; Mix Bikini also from Season 3 fails when their website crashes on their Shark Tank debut and Barbara Corcoran is not happy; Lori Greiner loves Bantam Bagels from Season 6 but wants them to change their name.

=== Season 2 (2016) ===
No. overall	No. in season	Title	Original release date	Prod. code	U.S. viewers (millions)
4	1	"Episode 1"	January 5, 2016	201	3.88
This episode provides updates on Grace and Lace, the company Barbara Corcoran invested in during Season 5, Matt Reed whose pitch of urban beehives was rejected by the sharks in season 6 and Scrub Daddy the scratch-free sponge idea Lori Greiner invested in Season 4.
5	2	"Episode 2"	January 7, 2016	202	4.29
This episode provides updates on Simple Sugars, the natural scrub product line that Mark Cuban invested in during Season 4, Abe Geary who rejected the only offer he got for his pitch of non-permanent hair spray for dogs from season 5, Biaggi a luggage company Lori Greiner invested in during Season 6 and 180 Cup a party cup with a built in shot glass that Daymond John invested in during Season 5.
6	3	"Episode 3"	January 14, 2016	106	4.10
This episode provides updates on The Paintbrush Cover, a product that stores wet paintbrushes that Lori Greiner invested in during season 5, Lollacup a sippy cup that Robert Herjavec invested in during season 3 and Liz Holtz whose idea of Gluten free cookies was rejected by the sharks in season 4.
7	4	"Episode 4"	January 21, 2016	107	4.28
This episode provides updates on Cousins Lobster, Mo's Bows and Bottle Breacher.
8	5	"Episode 5"	January 28, 2016	111	4.01
This episode updates on Squatty Potty, Tower Paddle and Wicked Good Cupcakes.
9	6	"Episode 6"	March 22, 2016	110	2.21
Mark visits BeatBox Beverages (season 6) as they want to expand their flavors but Mark feels they need to increase staff first, Barbara works with The Coop (season 4) to help increase their revenue and decide if they want to go with partnerships or franchises, Kevin visits Surprise Ride (season 5) who missed their deal with the Sharks to offer them another chance.
10	7	"Episode 7"	March 29, 2016	205	2.18
Happy Feet (season 5) works with Robert to get a licensing deal with DreamWorks, Oilerie USA (season 6) missed out on a deal and must overcome depression and difficulties, Treasure Chest Pets (season 1) gets hit by the downward economy and goes bankrupt but starts over with new ventures, Scratch & Grain Baking Co. (season 6) is having constant manufacturing issues and Target Corporation wants to place a large purchase order, so they ask Barbara for help.
11	8	"Episode 8"	April 5, 2016	104	1.88
TurboPUP (season 6) has low sales and Daymond brings the owner to New York to help, Drop Stop (season 4) is a huge success and Lori wants to increase staffing and take them to the next level, Frill Clothing (season 6) hosts a Shark Tank viewing party with Kevin who sees problems with their business model.
12	9	"Episode 9"	April 12, 2016	208	2.07
Nuts 'n More (season 4) is doing well but wants to expand into mass markets so Mark and Robert offer their advice, Bambooee (season 5) has done well with QVC and Costco wants expansion but Lori needs to direct their path; Zipz (season 6) needs a new co-packer to help expand their business and Kevin wants them to make more profit.
13	10	"Episode 10"	April 19, 2016	109	1.98
Hamboards (season 5) is having difficulty keeping up with growth and Robert offers aid, Original Runner Company (season 2) didn't get a deal but Barbara sees potential and gives advice, Ruckpack (season 4) has had difficulty maintaining a CEO and Kevin wants to help them grow.
14	11	"Episode 11"	April 26, 2016	204	2.03
Pipsnacks (season 6) is growing beyond expectations and Barbara offers expansion ideas, PurseCase (season 5) has had ownership issues and Lori offers her strategies, PittMoss (season 6) gets Mark to help them meet with an international plant brand.
15	12	"Episode 12"	May 3, 2016	105	1.91
Mark meets with Bon Affair (season 5) to discuss a distributor partnership, Daymond works with Mission Belt (season 4) to scale up sales and reach big-box stores, Lori visits Floating Mug Co. (season 6), who didn't get a deal, to scout them.
16	13	"Episode 13"	May 6, 2016	203	3.58
Robert meets with Mensch on a Bench (season 6) with concerns that they may be expanding their line too much, Mango Mango (season 5) didn't get a deal but still finds success, Toygaroo (season 2) reviews their mistakes that cost them their business, Daymond meets with Aqua Vault (season 6) about their plans for expansion.
17	14	"Episode 14"	May 13, 2016	207	3.52
Breathometer (season 5) looks to expand into oral health care and Kevin offers guidance, Bombas (season 6) talks with Daymond about their expansion plans, Gold Rush Nugget Bucket (season 6) has issues that Robert wants to help resolve, Barbara wants Hoppy Paws (season 6) to scale back on their line of products.
18	15	"Episode 15"	May 20, 2016	206	3.90
Honeyfund (season 6) is having issues with their expansion service and Kevin offers advice, CordaRoy's (season 4) meets with Lori to discuss retail expansion, Pork Barrel BBQ (season 1) has issues with both their co-packer and the USDA so Barbara helps.
19	16	"Episode 16"	June 3, 2016	108	3.53
Titin (season 6) is asked by Daymond to move into his offices in New York to grow their partnership, Q Flex (season 6) is having issues with back orders and Barbara discusses the use of a fulfillment center, The Natural Grip (season 6) talks with Robert about improving manufacturing and sales.
