= Love at Stake =

1987 film by John Moffitt

- Theatrical release poster
- Directed by: John C. Moffitt
- Written by: Lanier Laney; Terry Sweeney
- Produced by: John Daly; Derek Gibson; Michael Gruskoff; Donald C. Klune; Michael I. Levy
- Starring: Patrick Cassidy; Kelly Preston; Bud Cort; David Graf; Stuart Pankin; Dave Thomas; Anne Ramsey; Barbara Carrera
- Cinematography: Mark Irwin
- Edited by: Danford B. Greene
- Music by: Charles Fox
- Production company: Hemdale Film Corporation
- Distributed by: Tri-Star Pictures
- Release date: August 1, 1987
- Running time: 86 minutes
- Country: United States
- Language: English
- Box office: $61,789

Love at Stake is a 1987 American comedy film, directed by John C. Moffitt, based on a screenplay by Lanier Laney and Terry Sweeney. It stars Patrick Cassidy and Kelly Preston, with Barbara Carrera, Bud Cort, Dave Thomas, and Stuart Pankin. Joyce Brothers makes a cameo appearance as herself.

The film is an obvious spoof of the infamous Salem witch trials, moving in the vein of anarchic comedy films like Mel Brooks' Blazing Saddles and others by Monty Python and Zucker, Abrahams and Zucker.

The film was produced by Hemdale Film Corporation and was distributed by Tri-Star Pictures. Filming took place in Kleinburg, Ontario.

== Plot ==
In 1692, Miles Campbell, recent graduate of Harvard Divinity School, arrives in Salem, Massachusetts to become the local parson's assistant. He meets with his childhood sweetheart, baker Sara Lee, and plans to marry her. Meanwhile, greedy Judge Samuel John arrives to meet with idiotic Mayor Upton to discuss plans for a (anachronistic) Mall for Salem. To acquire the necessary real estate they hatch a scheme to accuse certain villagers of witchcraft. When the accused are tried, convicted and burned, their land can be confiscated. The plan is succeeding, as the villagers, egged on by the parson's shrewish mother, enthusiastically accept the Judge's message. Then saucy Faith Stewart (secretly a real witch) arrives from London for Thanksgiving with her cousins. Faith falls for Miles and accuses Sara of witchcraft. Miles must prove Sara's innocence before she is burned at the stake.

== Cast ==
- Patrick Cassidy as Miles Campbell
- Kelly Preston as Sara Lee
- Georgia Brown as Widow Chastity
- Barbara Carrera as Faith Stewart
- Bud Cort as Parson Babcock
- Annie Golden as Abigail Baxter, Faith's Cousin
- David Graf as Nathaniel Baxter, Her Husband
- Audrie J. Neenan as Mrs. Babcock, The Parson's Mother
- Stuart Pankin as Judge Samuel John
- Dave Thomas as Mayor Upton
- Anne Ramsey as Old Witch
- Mary Hawkins as Mrs. Priscilla Upton
- Jackie Mahon as Belinda Upton, The Mayor's Daughter
- Norma MacMillan as Aunt Deliverance Jones, Sara's Aunt
- Joyce Brothers as Herself
- Colleen Karney as Adulteress
- Juul Haalmeyer as The Executioner
- Julian Richings as Town Crier
- Danny Higham as Newsboy
- Marshall Perlmuter as Mr. Newberry
- Anna Ferguson as Mrs. Newberry
- Catharine Gallant as Constance Van Buren
- Jayne Eastwood as Annabelle Porter
- Nick Ramus as Chief Wannatoka
