= Cousins Maine Lobster =

American franchise food truck business

- Industry: Foodservice
- Founded: 2012
- Founders: Jim Tselikis, Sabin Lomac
- Headquarters: Los Angeles, California
- Website: www.cousinsmainelobster.com

Cousins Maine Lobster is a franchise food truck business based in Los Angeles, California, United States. In addition to food truck locations in Southern California, it has franchise locations throughout the U.S.

== History ==
The idea for Cousins Maine Lobster came in 2011 when cousins Jim Tselikis and Sabin Lomac were discussing food they used to eat while growing up in Portland, Maine. Impressed with the Los Angeles food truck industry, they decided to start selling Maine lobster in the L.A. area. The first truck opened in 2012 and by 2014 had four trucks in Southern California and signed up 10 franchisees in locations throughout the United States. The company received an investment of $55,000 from Barbara Corcoran after appearing on the television series Shark Tank in 2012.

Cousins opened its first brick-and-mortar location in 2015 in West Hollywood with additional menu items not found on the food trucks. At the time of the store opening, the company was operating 15 food trucks in 11 cities, and 26 trucks in 13 states by 2017. In April 2018, the Cousins published an ebook in the hope of inspiring other entrepreneurs to start a business, and not lose hope.

On April 11, 2021, Jim Tselikis and Sabin Lomac's new show, "Food Truck Rehab" premiered on the Food Network. As of February 2024, Cousins Maine Lobster had 60 locations and had plans to expand in the Chicago area.

== See also ==
- List of food trucks
