= Tipsy Elves =

Holiday-themed apparel company

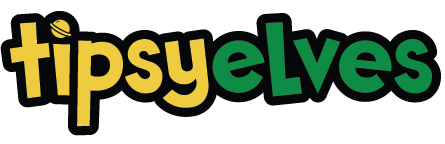
- Industry: Clothing production and retail
- Founded: 2011
- Founder: Evan Mendelsohn and Nick Morton
- Headquarters: San Diego, California, United States
- Website: Official website

Tipsy Elves is a holiday-themed apparel company. It sells holiday sweaters and other holiday-themed items through its website and other online vendors, and donates part of each sale to charity. In December 2013, the company's owners appeared on the US television show Shark Tank, and received $100,000 in funding to help the company move into the retail market.

== History ==
Tipsy Elves was founded in early 2011 by Evan Mendelsohn, a lawyer working for Sheppard, Mullin, Richter & Hampton with a JD and MBA from the University of Southern California, and Nick Morton, an endodontist who graduated from the University of the Pacific in 2008.

Their first line of designs were debuted during the Christmas season of that year, featuring Ugly Christmas sweaters with a humorous twist. The company produces holiday-themed sweaters and other apparel, designed to put an alternative spin on traditional Christmas motifs. Their buck-toothed reindeer sweater design and others were described by People Magazine as "sly, sneaky and cheeky". The buck-toothed reindeer sweater was also worn by the anchors of the Today Show in their ugly Christmas sweater competition of December 2011.

The Tipsy Elves brand is split between a "naughty" line with more extreme examples of humor, and a "nice" line that features tamer comical designs, however the naughty line sells the best. In the first year of sales the company sold over one thousand sweaters reaching about $370,000 in total web sales, and in the following year it reached nearly $1 million in sales. Tipsy Elves also runs the charity Sweaters 4 Sweaters, which donates sweaters to children in need using a portion of all the company's profits. In 2013 the company partnered with Stand Up to Cancer, and donated $2 from every sweater to the charity. The company has pledged between $25,000 and $100,000.

In 2014, the company's revenues had been projected as $12 million. In 2018, the website had reportedly done over $70 million in sales and sold over two million products since its launch.

== Television ==
The Tipsy Elves owners appeared on the December 13, 2013, episode of Shark Tank, in which it received $100,000 in funding from investor Robert Herjavec. After showing they had made over $1 million in their first two years, the company stated it intended to move into the retail market. According to Hollywood.com, "Kevin O'Leary made an offer, $100,000 for a royalty of $2 per sweater until the money was paid back and then $1 in perpetuity—but no equity. Herjavec offered $100,000 for 10%. Daymond John thought about making an offer, but couldn't pull the trigger. They accepted Herjavec's offer." Herjavec has called Tipsy Elves his best performing investment he has made with Shark Tank. The development of Tipsy Elves since Herjavec's investment was profiled on the premiere episode of Beyond the Tank.
