= Red Dress Boutique =

Women's clothing store

- Industry: Retail
- Founded: 2005
- Founder: Diana Best
- Headquarters: Athens, Georgia
- Products: Women's clothing
- Revenue: US $14 million (2014)
- Website: www.reddressboutique.com

Red Dress Boutique is a women's clothing store located in Athens, Georgia which also sells retail online. It appeared on Season 6 of Shark Tank where it was offered a $1.2 million investment.

Red Dress Boutique sells women's clothing, shoes and jewelry.

== History ==
Red Dress Boutique was founded by Diana Best (Last name Harbour at the time) in 2005. During her college years at Columbus State University, she grew to love small fashion boutiques while working at three small clothing shops. She opened her first boutique on Baxter street in Athens, Georgia because of the area's thriving local business scene and lack of chain stores. A second Red Dress Boutique location followed but later closed. An eCommerce site launched on December 6, 2009. In 2014, the company made $15 million in online sales.

The company appeared on Season 6 of Shark Tank in October 2014 where Mark Cuban and Robert Herjavec split a $1.2 million investment in exchange for 20% equity in the company. The terms changed after filming: Cuban alone completed an investment of $600,000 for a 15 percent stake. The company reportedly made $1 million in sales in the six days after the episode aired.

Diana Best bought back her equity from Mark Cuban on January 17, 2019. The news was made public on their Instagram feed. It was not disclosed what the purchase amount was for the buyback.
