= Breathometer =

Discontinued blood alcohol measurement device

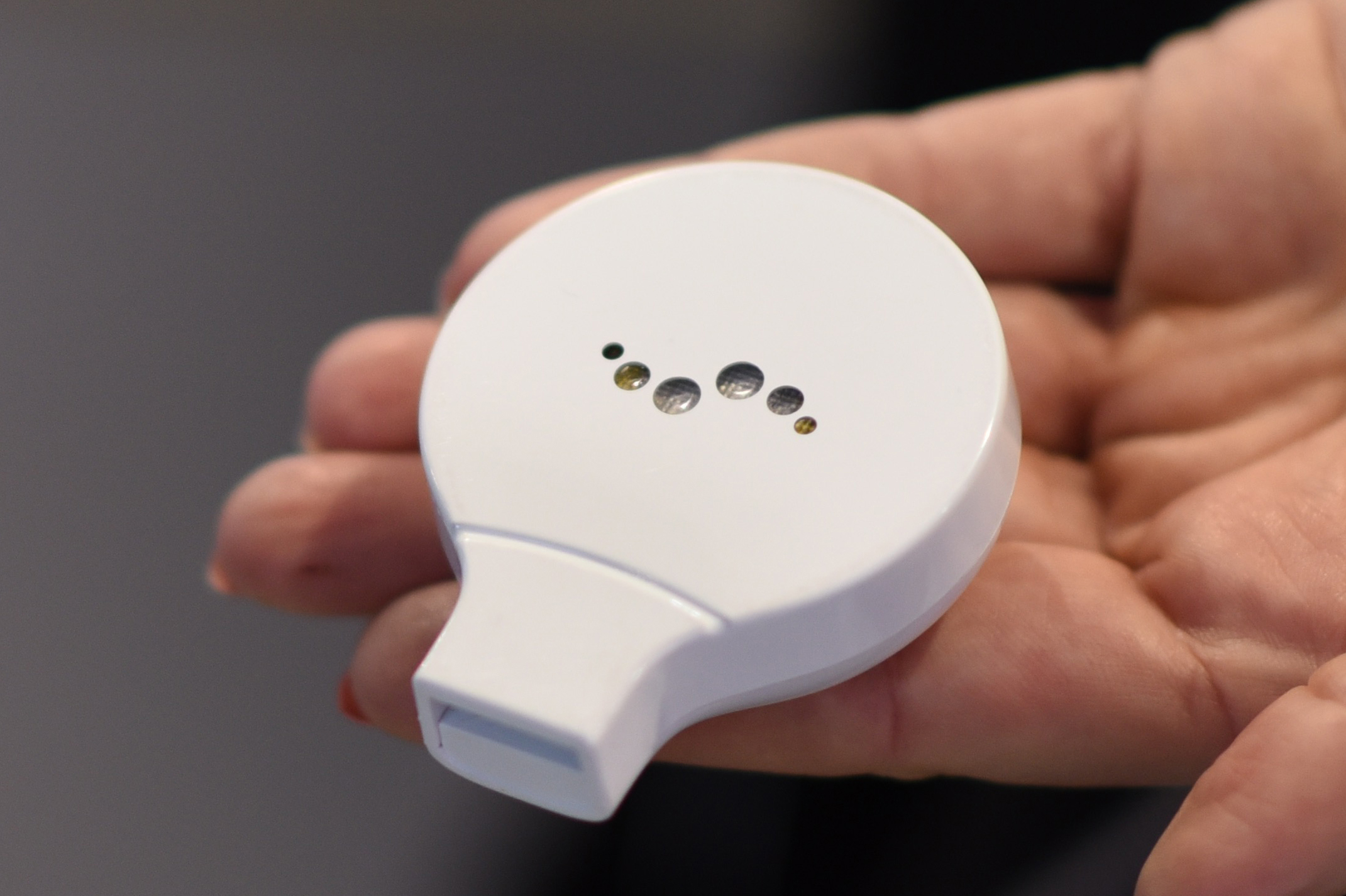
- Inventor: Charles Michael Yim
- Inception: 2013
- Manufacturer: Breathometer
- Available: No
- Website: http://www.breathometer.com (defunct)

Breathometer was a device that claimed to measure someone's blood alcohol content (like a Breathalyzer) using their iOS and Android smartphones. However, the app proved unreliable, and was shut down by the Federal Trade Commission.

== Company history ==
Breathometer was founded in 2012 by Charles Michael Yim, a serial entrepreneur who had earlier founded three startup companies including Chatterfly, a mobile loyalty platform for businesses that was acquired by Plum District in December 2011. Yim noted that there were no commercial breathalyzers for the smartphone market, and the only portable breathalyzers commercially available were both expensive and impractical for users to take with them on a night out.

The company was partly funded through preorders collected via an Indiegogo crowd-sourcing campaign, which ran until April 2013. The campaign's original goal was to raise $25,000, but by the time it closed, it had raised over $138,000.

In September 2013, Yim appeared on Shark Tank. He originally asked for $250,000 for a 10% stake in Breathometer, but all five "sharks" ended up investing a total of $1 million for a collective 30% stake in the company.

== Controversy ==
=== FTC complaint and product refunds ===
In 2017, an inquiry by the FTC resulted in a settlement with the company. The FTC charged that the company knew the product frequently underreported BAC levels and knowingly made false marketing claims of accuracy. The app was shut down and customers were required to be notified and offered full refunds. According to the complaint, sales of Original and Breeze totaled $5.1 million. Following the FTC controversy, Mark Cuban called Breathometer the "worst execution" in the history of Shark Tank, blaming the founder's mismanagement of funds and being perceived to go on expensive vacations rather than working.

== Products ==
=== The Breathometer ===
The Breathometer was a small device that plugged into the audio jack of a smartphone, coupled with a dedicated app that reads the user's blood alcohol content (BAC). The app utilized the smartphone to provide the processing power, which allowed the device to be small enough to fit on a standard keychain. If the user's BAC level was over the legal limit, the app displayed one-click calls to local taxi services, friends from contact lists living close by, or local hotels.

Sample beta units were handed out at the 2013 SXSW in Austin, Texas. The app was shut down in 2017 as the result of a settlement with the FTC.

=== Mint ===
The company pivoted transforming its technology into a new product to measure bad breath and oral health, called Mint. Breathometer released the Mint in September 2016. Sensors in the device measured sulfur compounds associated with bad breath and that scientists associate with periodontitis, also known as gum disease. The company partnered with Philips to bundle the Mint with Sonicare oral health products. As of 2026, the Mint is no longer available on its site or Amazon.
