= Nardo's Natural =

American skincare products company

Nardo's Natural is a family-owned organic skincare company headquartered in Clearwater, Florida.

== History ==
Nardo's Natural was founded by four brothers: Kyle, Danny, Keith (KJ, deceased), and DJ Mastronardo. They concocted the first jar of lotion in their parents' kitchen and registered the business in April 2009. On March 9, 2012, the brothers appeared on Shark Tank and partnered with real estate mogul Barbara Corcoran. In April 2012, Nardo's Natural released Nardo's Natural Muscle Rub, partnered with Major League Baseball pitcher David Price, and signed an endorsement deal. On May 17, 2012, Nardo's Natural organic skin care products were featured on Good Morning America. Tory Johnson selected the Nardo's Natural brand for an exclusive segment on GMA's "Steals & Deals".

On March 19, 2013, Keith (KJ) Mastronardo died in a motorcycle accident.

== Business ==
Nardo's beauty products are distributed to spas, salons, hotels, and resorts. Their first account was the Don CeSar in St. Pete Beach, Florida. Nardo's Natural expanded business to the Vinoy Park Hotel in Longboat Key, Florida.

== Environment ==
Nardo's Natural promotes a paraben-free, sulfate-free, and cruelty-free skin care line. Their products are allegedly acquired through sustainable environments that practice better business methods and quality control standards. The gluten-free and vegan products are formulated from botanical extracts.
