= Readerest =

- Type: Private
- Website: www.readerest.com

ReadeREST is a U.S. based company best known for a magnetic eyeglass holder, also called ReadeREST (pronounced Reader Rest)

== History ==
After turning 40, founder Rick Hopper started using readers and began habitually losing, scratching and dropping his glasses. In 2010, Hopper made prototypes using paperclips and magnets, solving the problem he had with trying to keep his glasses safe and secure. It did not take long for consumer interest to grow. Friends, family, and strangers would ask him about his ReadeREST and wanted their own. Noticing the potential market for the product, Hopper did a patent search and found that it had already been patented by a man named Bernard. To Hopper's luck the patent was for sale. Over the next year, Hopper went to farmers' markets, gun, golf, and quilt shows to gain a better understanding of his target audience.

Hopper appeared on Season 3, Episode 6 of Shark Tank, which aired on February 24, 2012. He sought $150,000 for a 15% equity stake in ReadeREST and accepted an offer from Lori Greiner of $150,000 for 65% equity.

Following the appearance, ReadeREST was sold through QVC and retailers including Bed Bath & Beyond, Walmart, and Ace Hardware.

== Products ==
ReadeREST is made with "high-grade magnets" and stainless steel. The product can also be used to hold ID badges and manage earbuds.
