= Beardbrand =

American men's grooming brand

- Company type: Private
- Industry: Men's grooming
- Founded: 2012
- Founder: Eric Bandholz (CEO); Lindsey Reinders; Jeremy McGee
- Headquarters: Austin, Texas, U.S.
- Area served: Worldwide
- Products: Beard oil; Mustache wax; Combs; Brushes; Scissors; Beard Wash; Beard Softener; Utility Balm; Styling Balm; Sea Salt Spray; Shampoo; Conditioner; Utility Bar
- Website: www.beardbrand.com

Beardbrand is an American men's grooming company based in Austin, Texas. It sells products for grooming, styling, and maintaining beards, hair, skin, and mustaches. In 2014, Beardbrand founder and CEO Eric Bandholz appeared on an episode of the reality television series Shark Tank.

== History ==
Prior to founding Beardbrand, Eric Bandholz worked as a financial advisor at Merrill Lynch in Spokane, Washington. Bandholz has stated his disapproval of the company's "no facial hair" policy and left in favor of starting a beard grooming company.

In 2011, he attended a Startup Weekend event in Spokane where he met Lindsey Reinders and Jeremy McGee. The three would go on to launch Beardbrand in Spokane in early 2012 along with a complementary Tumblr blog, YouTube channel, and an online magazine called Urban Beardsman (a term Bandholz has claimed to have coined).

Bandholz, Reinders, and McGee started with an initial financial capital of $8,000. None of them kept any profits from sales in the first 10 months of the company in an effort to keep it afloat. In January 2013, Bandholz was featured as a "beard expert" in an article for The New York Times. After the article was published, Beardbrand marketed itself across platforms such as YouTube, Tumblr, and Reddit, and launched its online store.

The company relocated to Austin, Texas in 2014. On October 31, 2014, Bandholz appeared on an episode of ABC's Shark Tank in order to accrue funding for Beardbrand. Bandholz asked for $400,000 in exchange for 15% of the company. After Bandholz gave his pitch, all five "sharks" declined to accept his deal.
