= Stitch marker (crochet) =

Mnemonic device used during crochet work

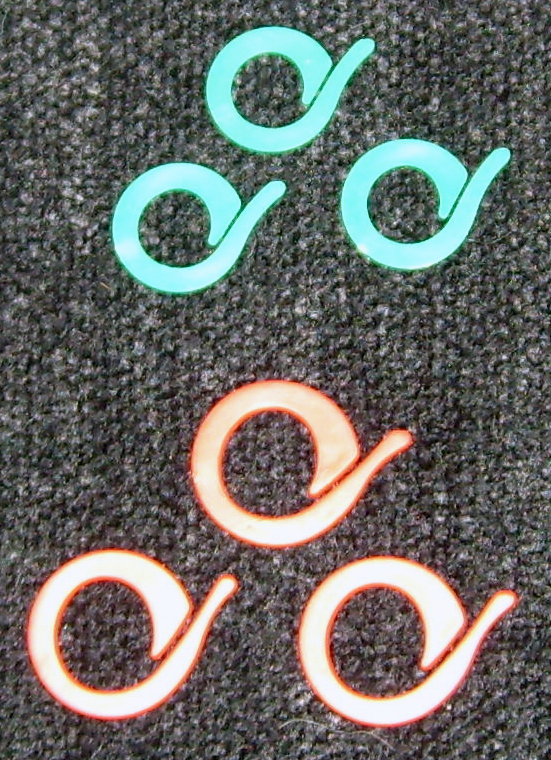
Crochet stitch markers

In crochet, a stitch marker is a mnemonic device used to distinguish important locations on a work in progress. Crochet patterns have a mathematical basis, so stitch markers serve as a visual reference that takes the place of continuous stitch counting and reduces a crocheter's error rate.

Common uses for stitch markers include noting the first stitch on a crochet round, marking increase or decrease points, or identifying key locations in a complex repetitive stitch pattern. Beginning crocheters may use stitch markers to identify a turning chain. Stitch markers can also designate attachment points for components of a multi-part project, such as a sleeve on a sweater.

Crochet often employs complex lacy patterns where stitch markers are helpful. Crochet also has less inherent stretch than knitting, so crocheted garments require greater contour adjustments at the pattern and construction level.

== Difference from knitting stitch markers ==
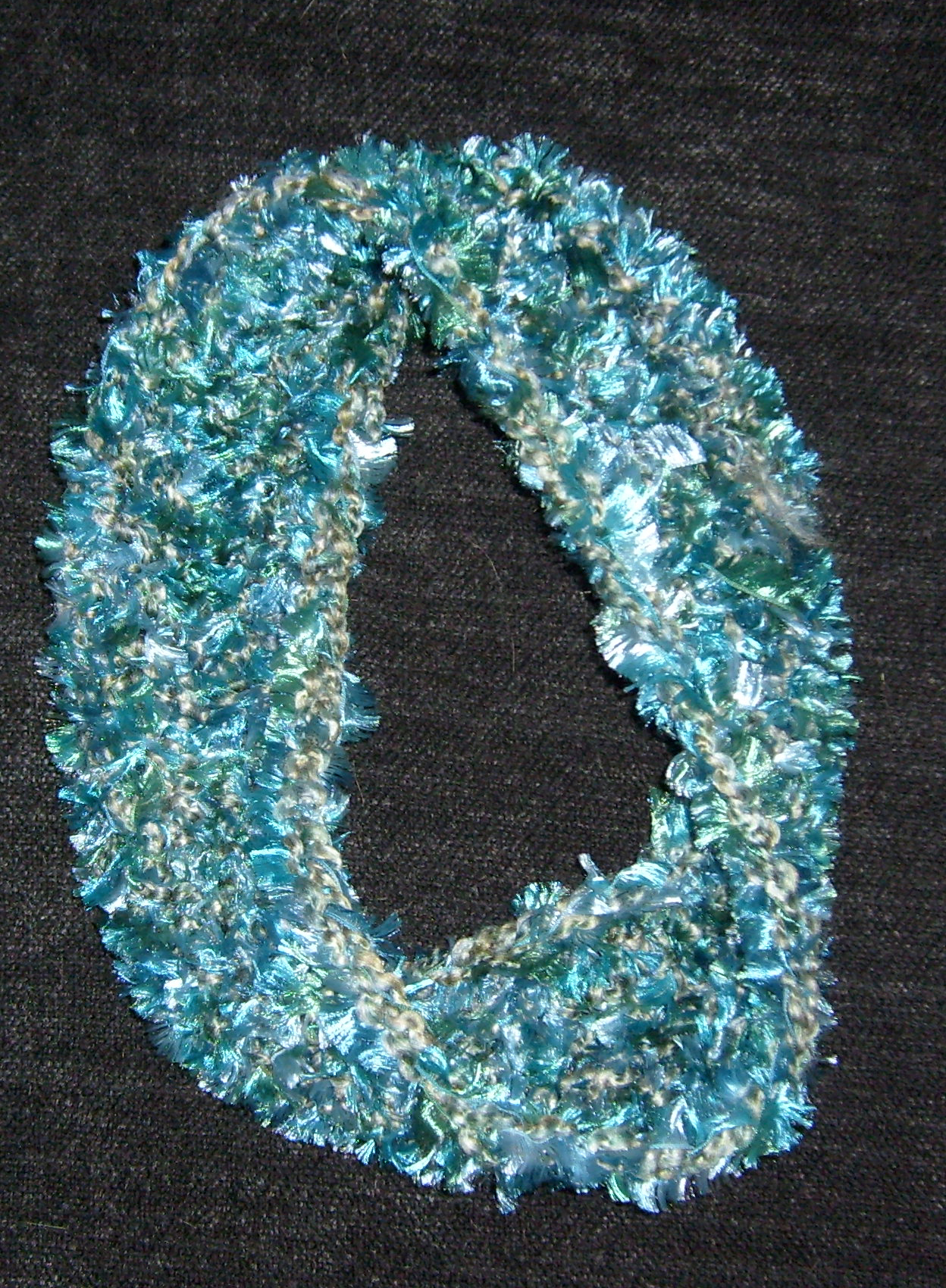
A demonstration of the mathematical basis of crochet: a scarf in the shape of a Möbius strip

Unlike knitting stitch markers, which are closed bands, crochet markers have open slots so that they can be removed and rehung on new rows as a craft item grows. In order to distinguish from other types of stitch markers, the markers designed for crochet use are also known as split stitch markers.

Specific advice from crochet expert Edie Eckman includes: "Avoid the round markers meant only for knitting; you need a type that can be opened so you can hang it on a stitch."

Among the differences between crochet and knitting is that crocheters rarely work with more than one stitch at a time, while knitters routinely carry dozens of stitches on their knitting needles. Because of this, these two textile arts require different kinds of stitch markers.
