= I Want to Draw a Cat For You =

Online startup company

- Type: Online business
- Industry: Custom art
- Founded: 2011
- Founder: Steve Gadlin
- Defunct: January 2015, revived in 2019, relaunched on Cameo in August 2020
- Area served: Global (online)
- Products: Custom stick figure cat drawings
- Website: iwanttodrawacatforyou.com

I Want to Draw a Cat For You is an online business owned by Steve Gadlin where customers can purchase custom drawings of stick figure cats that Gadlin draws to the customer's specifications. Gadlin first came up with the idea as a joke, with the goal of seeing if he could construct a successful business using only a widget. The business started in 2011, and originally, its website consisted of only an embedded YouTube video and a PayPal button. The business became well known after Gadlin appeared on Shark Tank (season three, episode two) to promote it, and, on the show, persuaded Mark Cuban to invest $25,000 in the idea. Gadlin stopped accepting orders for the company in January 2015, saying that “The project has run its course.”

As of November 2015, Gadlin was accepting orders for custom drawings for $29.99. After a yearlong shutdown, Gadlin resurrected the business in 2019, shifting to producing drawings on an iPad Pro using an Apple Pencil; previously, drawings were made with Sharpie markers on paper and scanned. The business subsequently relaunched in August 2020 on Cameo.

I Want to Draw a Cat For You is still in business and has sold over 22,400 drawings as of July 2025.
