= Robert Herjavec =

Canadian businessman (born 1962)

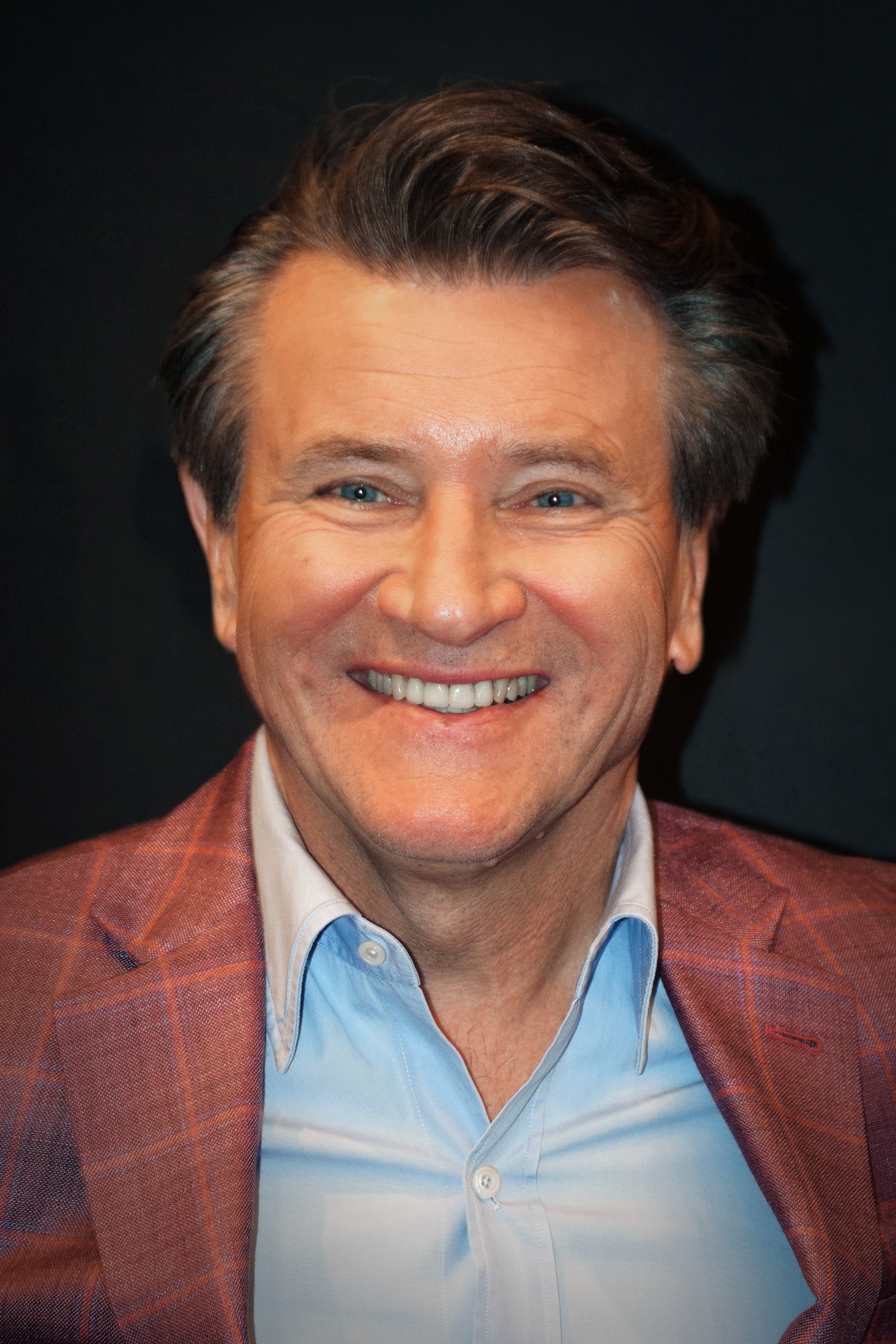
- Herjavec in 2023
- Born: September 14, 1962 (age 64); Varaždin, Yugoslavia
- Citizenship: Canada
- Education: University of Toronto (BA)
- Occupations: CEO of The Herjavec Group; Founder of BRAK Systems
- Spouses: Diane Plese (m. 1990; div. 2016) Kym Johnson (m. 2016)
- Children: 5
- Website: Official website

Robert Herjavec (Croatian: [xěrjaːʋet͡s]; born September 14, 1962) is a Croatian-Canadian businessman, investor, television personality, and cybersecurity expert.

Herjavec founded BRAK Systems, a Canadian integrator of Internet security software, and sold it to AT&T Canada (now Allstream Inc.) in 2000 for $30.2 million. In 2003, he founded The Herjavec Group, now one of the largest information technology and computer security companies in Canada, with over $200 million in annual revenue. He has been a panelist and investor on several versions of the business reality series Dragon's Den, including the Canadian CBC series Dragons' Den, the American ABC's version of the series Shark Tank, and from 2023, on the Australian Network 10 version also titled Shark Tank. He has also written books on business.

Herjavec received the 2012 Ernst & Young Ontario Entrepreneur of the Year Award for Technology and the 2012 Queen Elizabeth II Diamond Jubilee Medal by the governor-general of Canada for Outstanding Service to Canada.

== Early life ==
Herjavec was born in 1962 in Varaždin, SFR Yugoslavia (present-day Croatia), and spent his early childhood in Zbjeg. In 1970, when Herjavec was eight, the family left the country, which had previously jailed Herjavec's father, Vladimir Herjavec, for speaking out against the governing system. According to Herjavec, "He’d drink a little too much and then say bad things about Communism, and got thrown into jail 22 times for being an anti-Communist." Herjavec's family first arrived in Halifax, Nova Scotia with only $20. The family eventually settled in Toronto, where they lived in a family friend's home basement for 18 months. For Herjavec, who spoke no English, the transition proved difficult. Having grown up on a farm and raised by his grandmother among neighbours with similar lifestyles, he found himself in a much poorer economic class than his neighbours.

In 1984, Herjavec graduated from New College at the University of Toronto with a degree in English literature and political science. To make a living and help support his family, Herjavec took on various minimum wage jobs in the 1980s, such as waiting tables, delivering newspapers, retail sales, and debt collection.

== Career ==
=== Early career in film ===
In the mid-1980s, Herjavec worked in several productions as a third assistant director, including Cain and Abel and The Return of Billy Jack. He was a field producer for Global TV of the 1984 Winter Olympics in Sarajevo.

=== Business ===
Looking for work between productions, Herjavec applied for a position at Logiquest selling IBM mainframe emulation boards. He was not qualified for the position but convinced the company to give it to him by offering to work for free for six months. To pay the rent during this "free" period, Herjavec waited tables. He eventually rose in the ranks to become General Manager of Logiquest. In 1990, after being fired from Logiquest, he founded BRAK Systems, a Canadian integrator of Internet security software, from the basement of his home. BRAK Systems was sold to AT&T Canada (now Allstream Inc.) in March 2000 for $30.2 million. He then became vice president of sales at Ramp Network, which was sold to Nokia for $225 million. In June 2026, Herjavec was named among the angel investors backing Aryon Security, a cloud security enforcement company focused on preventing security misconfigurations before they reach production environments. The investment was part of a $29 million Series A funding round that brought the company's total funding to $38 million.

=== The Herjavec Group ===
In 2003, Herjavec founded The Herjavec Group, a security solutions integrator, reseller, and managed service provider. Herjavec Group is one of Canada's fastest-growing technology companies and the country's largest information technology security provider. The company has grown from 3 employees with $400,000 in sales in 2003 to $200 million in annual revenue.

In October 2017, Herjavec was phished by "email prankster" James Linton. Under the name of another company executive and using a fake e-mail address to impersonate him, he invited Herjavec a toga party. The fake account was later copied into official financial projection documents.

In February 2021, Apax Partners acquired a majority stake of Herjavec Group from Herjavec, who retained a significant stake and stayed on as CEO.

Apax Partners' purchase of a stake in Fishtech Group led to the merger and rebranding of The Herjavec Group and Fishtech Group as Cyderes in June 2022. The new brand went live June 13, 2022. Herjavec was the newly-formed company's CEO and board member.

Herjavec announced he would be stepping down as CEO of Cyderes September 24, 2024. In an accompanying news release, he said. "My life is very busy with family, and investments, but Cyderes will always remain my core business focus. We have built a great business providing amazing value, and I am excited to support Chris [Schueler] to take it to the next level. ... Chris's appointment as CEO ensures that Cyderes will continue to innovate and lead in the cybersecurity space.”

=== Television ===
Herjavec has appeared as a regular on the Canadian CBC Television series Dragons' Den (seasons 1–6, 17–18) and in the United States on ABC's version of the series, Shark Tank, where business pitches from aspiring entrepreneurs are presented to a panel of potential investors. Herjavec's most successful investment from the show is $100,000 for a 10% stake in sweater company Tipsy Elves. Herjavec has also invested in an herbal sparkling water company called Aura Bora. From 2023, he also began appearing on Network 10's Shark Tank Australia.

Herjavec won three Gemini Awards as part of Dragon’s Den for Outstanding Reality Show in Canada.

Herjavec presented awards at the 2013 Creative Arts Emmy Awards and the 2013 Mr. Olympia contest.

On February 24, 2015, Herjavec was announced as one of the contestants for season 20 of the American edition of Dancing with the Stars. His partner was Australian dancer Kym Johnson, who he subsequently began a relationship with and married. On May 5, 2015, during a double elimination, Herjavec and Johnson were eliminated and finished in 6th place.

== Publications ==
Herjavec is the author of three books. His first two books were Driven: How to Succeed in Business and Life (2010) and The Will to Win: Leading, Competing, Succeeding (2013). Driven is organized by the work and life principles that made Herjavec wealthy and successful, while The Will to Win delivers life lessons that promise to guide readers to greater happiness and success. "The Will to Win" is also the name of public presentations that Herjavec has given, which feature his advice to business people based on his life experiences. On March 29, 2016, his third book, You Don't Have to Be a Shark: Creating Your Own Success, was released.

== Personal life ==
=== Relationships ===
Herjavec married Dr. Diane Plese, an optometrist, in 1990. They separated in July 2014 and divorced in early 2016. He had suicidal ideation after his marriage fell apart. He and his ex-wife have two daughters, Caprice and Skye, and a son, Brendan. In June 2019, a judge ruled that Herjavec must pay his ex-wife additional sums that would bring the total she received from the marriage to $25 million.

In September 2015, Herjavec confirmed his relationship with his Dancing with the Stars partner Kym Johnson. On February 27, 2016, the two became engaged. On July 31, 2016, they were married in Los Angeles, California.

In December 2017, Herjavec and Kym announced that they were expecting twins. The twins, a boy and a girl, were born on April 23, 2018, named Hudson Robert Herjavec and Haven Mae Herjavec.

In 2017, Herjavec's ex-girlfriend, Danielle Vasinova, whom he dated from 2013 to 2015, sued him for rape after he sued her for attempting to extort him over false claims of sexual assault. Both suits were dismissed in mid-2018. The allegations against Herjavec were withdrawn without financial settlement, and Vasinova apologized to Herjavec and his family.

=== Charitable support ===
Herjavec is a major donor to the Union Gospel Mission homeless shelter in Seattle, Washington, after being turned on to the organization by his pastor, whom he consulted to deal with his depression after his marriage fell apart.

=== Home ===
Herjavec owns a home in the Bridle Path, Toronto, area. The mansion has been host to Michael Bublé, John Travolta, Mick Jagger, and Bono. Herjavec paid $7.5 million for the mansion, and it was featured on MTV Cribs, Joan Rivers's TV show How'd You Get So Rich?, and a Rolling Stones tour video. Herjavec also has several other vacation homes.

In December 2023, Herjavec was returning from his Newport Beach, California, home when his private jet was met by the Canadian news media at Toronto Pearson International Airport. This was due to speculation that the plane was carrying baseball player Shohei Ohtani (who was on the Los Angeles Angels at the time) to meet with the Toronto Blue Jays, but Ohtani was not aboard and instead announced he would be joining the Los Angeles Dodgers.

=== Recreational activities ===
Herjavec is an avid golfer and runner. He has played in the 2010 Canadian charity open sponsored by Royal Bank of Canada at the Royal St George's Golf Club. He has also competed in the 2010 New York City Marathon and the 2009 Miami Marathon. He is certified by the Professional Association of Diving Instructors as a scuba diver and owns several Ducati motorcycles.

A passion of Herjavec's is car racing. He competes in the Ferrari Challenge. Herjavec competed as #007 for The Herjavec Group Racing team in the North American Ferrari Challenge Series, where he won the Rookie of the Year title in 2011, after winning both races at the season-opener in St. Petersburg, Florida and following up with wins in Laguna Seca Raceway and Lime Rock, Connecticut.

In 2012, Herjavec was selected as the grand marshal for the 2012 Honda Indy Toronto. He is also an avid car collector with several rare cars in his collection.

=== Awards ===
In 2011, Herjavec was one of the Top 25 Canadian Immigrant Awards recipients presented by Canadian Immigrant magazine.
