= Shark Tank season 5 =

Shark Tank
- Season 5
- No. of episodes: 29

Release
- Original network: ABC
- Original release: September 20, 2013 – May 16, 2014

Season chronology
- ← Previous; Season 4 Next → Season 6

This is a list of episodes from the fifth season of Shark Tank.

== Episodes ==
Before the start of this season, Mark Cuban insisted that the production company relinquish its equity clause (two percent of their profits or five percent equity in their company) with respect to featured businesses who choose to do a deal with the sharks. The change applied to all businesses, both from that point on and retroactively.
John Paul Mitchell Systems co-founder John Paul DeJoria and New York Giants owner Steve Tisch appeared as guest sharks this season.

No. overall	No. in season	Title	Original release date	Prod. code	U.S. viewers (millions)
65	1	"Lynnae's Gourmet Pickles, Postcard on the Run, Rolodoc, Sweet Ballz"	September 20, 2013	501	6.86
Sharks: Mark, Barbara, Kevin, Lori, Robert "Postcard on the Run" a mobile app for sending postcards (YES); "Lynnae's Gourmet Pickles" specialty pickles (NO); "RoloDoc" a system for upgrading communication between patients and medical professionals (NO); "Sweet Ballz" cake balls (YES); Update on: Wicked Good Cupcakes (Episode 423); Note: This is the first episode with both Barbara and Lori, and the first episode without Daymond John.
66	2	"Breathometer, Man Medals, Mango Mango, Kane & Couture"	September 27, 2013	502	6.94
Sharks: Mark, Daymond, Kevin, Lori, Robert "Mango Mango" (later renamed Mango Mangeaux) mango preserves (NO); "Breathometer" a smartphone breathalyzer (YES); "Man Medals" medals for men doing chores (NO); "Kane & Couture" designer dog apparel and accessories (YES); Update on: Simple Sugars (Episode 420)
67	3	"Fairytale Wishes, Freeloader, Kook'n Kap, Rapid Ramen"	October 4, 2013	503	6.45
Sharks: Mark, Barbara, Kevin, Lori, Robert "Fairytale Wishes" aromatherapy sprays for children (NO); "The Freeloader" a piggyback carrier for children (YES); "Kookn' Kap" a breathable, non-flammable cooking cap to keep aromas out of your hair (NO); "Rapid Ramen Cooker" a specially designed bowl for cooking ramen noodles (YES); Update on: Echo Valley Meats (Episode 421)
68	4	"Hamboards, Scan, ScreenMend, Sunday Night Slow Jams"	October 11, 2013	504	6.53
Sharks: Mark, Daymond, Kevin, Lori, Robert "Sunday Night Slow Jams" a love songs radio show (NO); "Hamboards" skateboards that ride like a surfboard (YES); "Scan" a QR code application (NO); "ScreenMend" window screen repair patches (YES); Update on: Mission Belt (Episode 422); Note: R&B musician Brian McKnight makes a cameo to pitch for Sunday Night Slow Jams.
69	5	"BareEase, Rent A Goat, RuffleButts, Veggie Mama"	October 18, 2013	505	6.64
Sharks: Mark, Barbara, Kevin, Lori, Robert "RuffleButts and RuggedButts" a children's clothing line (YES); "Bare Ease" hair removal numbing cream and underwear (NO); "Rent A Goat" a goat renting service for an environmentally friendly way to take care of your lawn (NO); "Veggie Mama Garden Pops" popsicles containing fruits and vegetables, sweetened with agave nectar (YES); Update on: Nardo's Natural (Episode 308)
70	6	"Elephant Chat, FiberFix, Ten Thirty One Productions, Total Merchant Resources"	October 25, 2013	506	7.39
Sharks: Mark, Daymond, Kevin, Lori, Robert "FiberFix" super strong duct tape (YES); "Elephant Chat" a literal elephant in the room to aid communication between spouses (NO); "Ten Thirty One Productions" an entertainment company specializing in horror attractions (YES); "Total Merchant Resources" a company that provides small business loans (YES); Update on: Shell Bobber (Episode 422); Note: This episode contained the biggest deal made on the show to date at the time of airing (Ten Thirty One Productions). That deal has since been surpassed (Zipz, Episode 611).
71	7	"180CUP, Better Life, Kymera, Tree T Pee"	November 1, 2013	507	7.31
Sharks: Mark, Daymond, Kevin, Lori, John Paul DeJoria "Better Life" 100% natural cleaning products (YES); "180Cup" a beer cup that doubles as a shot glass (YES); "Kymera Body Board" electric powered body boards (NO); "Tree-T-Pee" a device for watering trees more efficiently (YES); Update on: Teddy Needs a Bath (Episode 413)
72	8	"Paparazzi Proposals, Bellybuds, Schulzies Bread Pudding, PetPaint"	November 8, 2013	508	7.32
Sharks: Mark, Barbara, Kevin, Lori, Robert "Schulzies Bread Pudding" bread pudding desserts (NO); "Paparazzi Proposals" a paparazzi-style photography business that captures your proposal without being seen (YES); "BellyBuds" speakers for playing music to the womb of expectant mothers (NO); "PetPaint" colored hairspray for dogs (NO); Update on: SoundBender (Episode 414)
73	9	"DoorBot, Magic Moments, SLAWSA, Surprise Ride"	November 15, 2013	509	6.48
Sharks: Mark, Daymond, Kevin, Lori, Robert "DoorBot" a doorbell with a camera and speaker that connects to your smartphone (NO); "Slawsa" a cross between a coleslaw and a salsa (NO); "Magic Moments" an app that allows you to put your photos on products that you can sell (NO); "Surprise Ride" a monthly box of themed educational activities for children (NO); Update on: "Barbara's All Stars" Barbara takes some of her top investments [Cousins Maine Lobster (Episode 406), Villy Customs (Episode 313), Tom + Chee (Episode 426), Ryan's Barkery (Episode 426), Daisy Cakes (Episode 206), The Coop (Episode 411), Ride-On, Carry-On (Episode 204)] on a weekend retreat to Fire Island and promotes a new Shark Tank book of advice for entrepreneurs from all the sharks.
74	10	"YUBO, Pursecase, Chocomize, Grace and Lace"	November 22, 2013	510	7.06
Sharks: Mark, Barbara, Kevin, Lori, Robert "Yubo" personalized lunchboxes that are easy to clean (YES); "PurseCase" a mini purse cell phone case that carries your smartphone and a few essentials (YES); "Chocomize" customizable chocolate bars (NO); "Grace and Lace" knitted boot socks (YES); Update on: Drop Stop (Episode 420)
75	11	"Virtuix, SpiritHoods, Fohawx, Bubba's Q BBQ"	December 6, 2013	511	7.55
Sharks: Mark, Daymond, Kevin, Barbara, Robert "SpiritHoods" furry hoods that resemble animals (NO); "Virtuix Omni" a virtual reality platform that allows free movement (YES: after this episode filming); "FoHawx" a line of accessories that attach to bike helmets (NO); "De-Boned Baby Back Rib Steak" ribs with the bones removed so they can be eaten with a knife and a fork (YES); Update on: "Kingonomics Conference" Daymond and Mark attend an event celebrating minority entrepreneurs in honor of the 50th anniversary of the March on Washington.
76	12	"Cashmere Hair, The Hanukah Tree Topper, Tipsy Elves, Line-Netics"	December 13, 2013	512	7.17
Sharks: Mark, Daymond, Kevin, Lori, Robert "Lite-Netics" magnetic Christmas lights (NO); "One Life Products" a Hanukkah tree topper for interfaith families (YES); "Cashmere Hair" a luxury hair extension company (NO); "Tipsy Elves" a line of holiday clothing (YES); Update on: Ruckpack (Episode 410)
77	13	"Bounce Boot Camp, Wall Rx, Eyebloc, GrooveBook"	January 10, 2014	513	7.36
Sharks: Mark, Daymond, Kevin, Lori, Robert "Bounce Boot Camp" a company that uses inflatable bounce houses as fitness equipment for children (NO); "The Wall DoctoRX" an easy way to patch holes in walls (YES); "EyeBloc" a plastic cover for laptop webcams (NO); "GrooveBook" a service that creates photobooks from your smartphone photos (YES); Update on: Nuts N' More (Episode 418)
78	14	"Alaska Glacial Mud Co., invisiPlug, LockerBones, Balloon Distractions"	January 17, 2014	514	7.44
Sharks: Mark, Barbara, Kevin, Lori, Robert "Alaska Glacial Mud Co." a facial mask made from Alaskan glacial mud (NO); "InvisiPlug" powerstrips designed to blend in with hardwood floors (YES); "LockerBones" customizable shelving for school lockers (YES); "Balloon Distractions" a business that provides balloon artists to restaurants to entertain customers while they wait for their food (NO); Update on: Tom + Chee (Episode 426)
79	15	"SwimZip, FitDeck, LifeCaps, Freshly Picked"	January 24, 2014	515	8.18
Sharks: Mark, Daymond, Kevin, Lori, Robert "SwimZip" children's swimwear with UV sun protection (YES); "FitDeck" custom playing cards for exercising (NO); "LifeCaps" emergency nourishment pills (NO); "Freshly Picked" moccasins for babies (YES); Update on: Daisy Cakes (Episode 206); Note: In a Shark Tank first, the creator of FitDeck was given, based on his background, a guaranteed chance to return in the future with a different product.
80	16	"Cow Wow, Nexersys, Cycloramic, The Cookie Dough Cafe"	January 31, 2014	516	7.49
Sharks: Mark, Daymond, Kevin, Lori, Steve Tisch "Cow Wow Cereal Milk" flavored milk that tastes like what's left at the bottom of a bowl of cereal (NO); "The Cookie Dough Cafe" cookie dough in a jar that is designed to be eaten raw (YES); "Nexersys" a fitness and gaming platform (NO); "Cycloramic" an app that takes 360-degree pictures by making the phone spin itself around (YES); Update on: PRO-NRG (Episode 406); Note: Olympic boxer Marlen Esparza makes a cameo to demonstrate Nexersys.
81	17	"Moberi, Spy Escape and Evasion, DDP YOGA, Southern Culture Artisan Foods"	February 21, 2014	517	6.21
Sharks: Mark, Daymond, Kevin, Barbara, Robert "Moberi" a bicycle-powered juice and smoothie cart (NO); "Spy Escape and Evasion" a spy school via seminar classes that teach defense tactics (YES); "DDP Yoga" a fitness program based on yoga developed by former pro wrestler Diamond Dallas Page (NO); "Southern Culture Artisan Foods" specialty pancake and waffle mixes (YES); Update on: The GameFace Company (Episode 412)
82	18	"Cheek'd, Zipit, Bambooee, Buzzy"	February 28, 2014	518	7.79
Sharks: Mark, Barbara, Kevin, Lori, Robert "Cheek'd" a unique dating service (NO); "ZipIt" a fitted sheet and sleeping bag combo for making beds quickly and easily (NO); "Bambooee" bamboo paper towels that are washable and reusable (YES); "Buzzy4Shots" a device that uses vibration to numb skin in preparation for medical shots (NO); Update on: Kisstixx (Episode 307)
83	19	"Revolights, Squeeky Knees, Buffer Bit, U-lace"	March 7, 2014	519	7.69
Sharks: Mark, Daymond, Kevin, Lori, Robert "RevoLights" an innovative lighting system for bicycles (YES); "Squeeky Knees" clothing for crawling babies with built-in squeakers in the knees (NO); "The Buffer Bit" a shoe buffing pad that attaches to a power drill (NO); "U-Lace" interchangeable mix and match shoelaces for easily changing the look and style of sneakers (YES); Update on: KaZAM (Episode 424)
84	20	"Define Bottle, iReTron, Boo Boo Goo, Henry's Humdingers"	March 14, 2014	520	7.49
Sharks: Mark, Barbara, Kevin, Lori, Robert "Define Bottle" a water bottle specially designed for infusing fresh fruit flavor (NO); "iReTron" an electronics recycling service (YES); "Boo Boo Goo" a colored, waterproof liquid bandage (YES); "Henry's Humdingers" spicy flavored honeys (YES); Update on: Ryan's Barkery (Episode 426); Note: This episode featured young entrepreneurs.
85	21	"Chapul, Garage Door Lock, Morninghead, Packback"	March 21, 2014	521	8.29
Sharks: Mark, Daymond, Kevin, Barbara, Robert "Chapul" energy bars made with cricket proteins (YES); "Garage Door Lock" a locking system for garage doors (YES); "MorningHead" a cap for curing bed head hair (NO); "Packback Books" a digital textbook rental service (YES); Update on: Fiber Fix (Episode 506)
86	22	"Kodiak Cakes, Monkey Mat, Plated, The Paint Brush Cover"	April 4, 2014	522	7.49
Sharks: Mark, Barbara, Kevin, Lori, Robert "Kodiak Cakes" a whole grain flapjack and waffle mix (NO); "Monkey Mat" a portable fabric floor covering (YES); "Plated" a service that delivers pre-measured ingredients for various recipes to your door (YES); "The Paint Brush Cover" a device that prevents paintbrushes from drying out (YES); Update on: Grace and Lace (Episode 510)
87	23	"Happy Feet, Lord Nut Levington, Velocity Signs, Hold Your Haunches"	April 10, 2014	523	6.85
Sharks: Mark, Barbara, Kevin, Lori, Robert "Velocity Signs" robotic sign waving machines (YES); "Lord Nut Levington" gourmet peanuts (NO); "Happy Feet" fanciful slippers (YES); "Hold Your Haunches" leggings with a built-in shaper (YES); Update on: CordaRoy's (Episode 419)
88	24	"Taylor Robinson Music, Funtime Express, Power Pot, Quickstop Fire Sprinkler Tools"	April 11, 2014	524	6.95
Sharks: Mark, Daymond, Kevin, Lori, Robert "Taylor Robinson Music" an online platform for finding music instructors (NO); "PowerPot" a cooking pot that generates electricity as you heat up water (YES); "Fun Time Express" a trackless train ride for malls (YES); "Quickstop Fire Sprinkler Tools" a simple tool to immediately stop water from a fire sprinkler (NO); Update on: Ava the Elephant (Episode 101)
89	25	"ilumi, Zoobean, Intelli-Stopper, Fort Magic"	April 18, 2014	525	6.77
Sharks: Mark, Barbara, Kevin, Lori, Robert "iLumi" a versatile home lighting system controlled from a smartphone (YES); "ZooBean" a subscription service for children's books (YES); "Intelli-Stopper Technology" a wine bottle stopper with an indicator that shows if there is air inside (NO); "Fort Magic" a building and construction toy (NO); Update on: Breathometer (Episode 502)
90	26	"Crio Bru, Rugged Races, Cerebral Success, Mo's Bows"	April 25, 2014	526	7.11
Sharks: Mark, Daymond, Kevin, Barbara, Robert "Crio" a brewed drink made from cocoa beans (NO); "Rugged Maniac" an obstacle race event (YES); "Cerebral Success" a brain supplement designed to enhance focus, memory, and mental energy (YES); "Mo's Bows" handmade bowties (NO, but Daymond promised to be a mentor); Update on: Marz Sprays (Episode 405)
91	27	"The Bouqs Company, Angellift, HangEase, Susty Party"	May 2, 2014	527	8.33
Sharks: Mark, Barbara, Kevin, Lori, Robert "The Bouqs Company" simplified floral bouquets (NO); "Angellift" facial lifting strips (YES); "HangEase" a folding plastic clothes hanger (YES); "Susty Party" eco-friendly party supplies (NO); Update on: GrooveBook (Episode 513); Note: This episode was preceded by a special program 'Swimming With Sharks' featuring behind the scenes of Shark Tank production and updates on past businesses from the show.
92	28	"Oru Kayak, Bon Affair, Hargitt Marine Services, Cinnaholic"	May 9, 2014	528	7.40
Sharks: Mark, Daymond, Kevin, Barbara, Robert "Oru Kayak" a kayak that can be folded into a compact suitcase (YES); "Bon Affair" a premium wine spritzer (YES); "Hargitt Marine Services" a treasure hunter who wants funding to salvage cargo from a sunken ship (NO); "Cinnaholic" custom gourmet cinnamon rolls (YES); Update on: Cousins Maine Lobster (Episode 406)
93	29	"Season Finale: Baker's Edge, Foot Fairy, Tie-Not, BZBOX"	May 16, 2014	529	6.74
Sharks: Mark, Barbara, Kevin, Lori, Robert "Baker's Edge" innovative baking pans and accessories (NO); "Foot Fairy" an iPad app which measures your child's foot size (YES); "Tie-Not" a water balloon filling and tying device (NO); "BZbox" collapsible storage boxes (YES); Update on: Season 5 Recap

Cinnaholic
