= Shark Tank season 6 =

Shark Tank
- Season 6
- No. of episodes: 29

Release
- Original network: ABC
- Original release: September 26, 2014 – May 15, 2015

Season chronology
- ← Previous; Season 5 Next → Season 7

This is a list of episodes from the sixth season of Shark Tank.

== Episodes ==
Nick Woodman, creator of the GoPro camera, appeared as a guest shark in two episodes this season.

No. overall	No. in season	Title	Original release date	Prod. code	U.S. viewers (millions)
94	1	"Season 6 Premiere: Sleeping Baby, Hammer & Nails, Amber, and Bombas"	September 26, 2014	601	7.45
Sharks: Mark, Daymond, Kevin, Lori, Robert "Sleeping Baby" sleepwear for newborns that imitates the protection of the womb so they don't wake as easily (YES); "Hammer & Nails" a masculine nail salon (NO); "Amber" a cellphone charging station (NO); "Bombas" quality athletic socks (YES); Update on: "Mark & Barbara's All Stars" Mark, Barbara, and some of their top investments [KaZAM (Episode 424), Lollacup (Episode 312), U-Lace (Episode 519), Kisstixx (Episode 307), Monkey Mat (Episode 522), Ryan's Barkery (Episode 426)] celebrate a special Shark Tank display at Target.
95	2	"Season 6 Premiere: Roominate, Wedding Wagon, Floating Mug and Kronos Golf"	September 26, 2014	602	7.45
Sharks: Mark, Barbara, Kevin, Lori, Robert "Roominate" a construction set toy (YES); "The Floating Mug Co." mugs and glasses with built-in coasters (NO); "Wedding Wagon" a van used as a mobile wedding chapel (NO); "Kronos" premium golf putters (YES); Update on: Simple Sugars (Episode 420)
96	3	"Week 2: SoapSox, Heart Pup, Ninja Cards, DrumPants"	October 3, 2014	603	7.29
Sharks: Mark, Daymond, Kevin, Lori, Robert "SoapSox" plush toys that work as bath sponges (NO); "Heart Pup" a wearable sling for carrying a dog (YES); "Ninja Cards" a game similar to darts that uses special throwing cards (NO); "DrumPants" touch sensors you wear on your body that play music (NO); Update on: Villy Customs (Episode 313)
97	4	"Week 3: FunCakes Rental, Paper Box Pilots, Tablejacks USA, Reviver"	October 10, 2014	606	7.34
Sharks: Mark, Barbara, Kevin, Lori, Robert "FunCakes Rental" fake wedding cakes (NO); "Paper Box Pilots" decorative stickers to make cardboard boxes look like vehicles (YES); "Table Jacks" a way to fix wobbly tables (NO); "Reviver" freshening wipes for masking odors on clothing (YES); Update on: ScreenMend (Episode 504)
98	5	"Week 4: Jungle Jumparoo, The Caddy Girls, Red Dress Boutique, Sun-Staches"	October 17, 2014	605	7.32
Sharks: Mark, Daymond, Kevin, Lori, Robert "Jungle JumpaRoo" a play structure for kids (NO); "The Caddy Girls" a company that provides all-female golf caddys (NO); "The Red Dress Boutique" an online mail-order service for afforable, fashionable outfits (YES); "SunStaches" novelty sunglasses with attached facial accessories (YES); Update on: Ten Thirty One Productions (Episode 506)
99	6	"Week 5: Oilerie USA, Honeyfund, EmergenSee, Beatbox Beverages, and Jimmy Kimmel"	October 24, 2014	604	6.89
Sharks: Mark, Barbara, Kevin, Lori, Robert "Oilerie USA" a chain of specialty olive oil stores (NO); "Honeyfund" a crowdfunding service that allows wedding guests to donate money toward the honeymoon trip rather than purchase traditional gifts (YES); "EmergenSee" a personal security system smartphone app (NO); "BeatBox Beverages" an innovative brand of box wine (YES); Update on: Breathometer (Episode 502); Note: This episode concluded with a promotion for Jimmy Kimmel Live where the host entered the tank to present a mock pitch to the sharks.
100	7	"Week 6: Titin, Beardbrand, Singtrix, Myself Belts"	October 31, 2014	609	7.80
Sharks: Mark, Daymond, Kevin, Lori, Robert "Titin" a weighted workout shirt designed to increase exercise performance (YES); "Beardbrand" a kit of facial hair maintenance products (NO); "SingTrix" a karaoke system with pitch correction and various vocal effects (NO); "Myself Belts" a velcro belt specially designed for young children (YES); Update on: Grace and Lace (Episode 510)
101	8	"Week 7: The Natural Grip, Priority One Canine, Man-PACK, Bottle Breacher"	November 7, 2014	608	7.80
Sharks: Mark, Daymond, Kevin, Lori, Robert "The Natural Grip" a hand grip designed to help the user better handle fitness equipment (YES); "Priority One Canine" professionally trained canine bodyguards (NO); "Man-Pack" a multipurpose messenger bag for men (NO); "Bottle Breacher" beer bottle openers made from 50 caliber bullets (YES); Update on: "Special White House Event" Daymond, Kevin, and Robert, along with Stella Valle (Episode 425) and Ruckpack (Episode 410), visit the White House for a "Champions of Change" event celebrating veteran entrepreneurs. Note: This episode was a Veteran's Small Business Week special saluting entrepreneurs who had served in the military. First Lady Michelle Obama appeared in a segment promoting Veteran's Small Business Week and JoiningForces.gov; Athlete Danielle Sidell makes a cameo to demonstrate The Natural Grip.
102	9	"Week 8, The 100th Episode: Storm Stoppers, Pipsnacks, Squatty Potty, Heidi Ho"	November 14, 2014	610	7.63
Sharks: Mark, Barbara, Kevin, Lori, Robert "Storm Stoppers" protective window coverings for use during hurricanes as an alternative to plywood (NO); "Pipsnacks" a line of organic mini-popcorn snacks (YES); "Squatty Potty" a footstool that puts the user of a western toilet in a squatting position for more natural, healthier bowel movements (YES); "Heidi Ho" a dairy-free line of plant-based cheese spreads (YES); Update on: The Living Christmas Company (Episode 411); Note: This episode concluded with a special segment celebrating 100 episodes of Shark Tank where Daymond (who was not in the episode) joins the others and they discussed their favorite memories from the show and the value they hope it brings viewers.
103	10	"Week 9: Kitchen Safe, Off the Cob, Magic Cook, Earth-Log"	November 21, 2014	612	7.91
Sharks: Mark, Daymond, Kevin, Lori, Nick Woodman "Kitchen Safe" a container with a timer-lock closure to keep tempting food or items out of reach (YES); "Off the Cob" tortilla chips made with sweet corn instead of grain corn (NO); "MagicCook" a portable cooking device that uses an instant heat pack to cook foods or liquids, not requiring power or fire (YES); "Earth Log" an environmentally friendly recycled firelog (YES); Update on: Tipsy Elves (Episode 512)
104	11	"Week 10: Biaggi, S.W.A.G Essentials, Gameday Couture, Zipz"	December 5, 2014	613	7.22
Sharks: Mark, Daymond, Kevin, Lori, Robert "Biaggi" a line of collapsible, folding luggage designed to save space when not in use (YES); "Soaps Washes and Grooming Essentials" an exfoliating and moisturizing soap bar specially formulated for men (NO); "Gameday Couture" fashionable sports team wear for women (YES); "Zipz" a proprietary container and brand for a single serving of wine, similar to Copa di Vino but in a resealable glass (YES); Update on: "Lori's All Stars" Lori and some of her top investments [Scrub Daddy (Episode 407), Drop Stop (Episode 420), Readerest (Episode 306), ScreenMend (Episode 504), InvisiPlug (Episode 514), FiberFix (Episode 506)] celebrate a special Shark Tank display at Bed Bath & Beyond. Note: This episode contains the biggest deal made on the show to date. (Zipz)
105	12	"Week 11: Mensch on a Bench, Eve Drop, Q Flex, Hoppy Paws"	December 12, 2014	614	7.04
Sharks: Mark, Barbara, Kevin, Lori, Robert "The Mensch on a Bench" an alternative to The Elf on the Shelf for Jewish families (YES); "Eve Drop" a sliding clip that raises Christmas lights behind the eaves on a roof when out of season so they don't need taken down and rehung each year (NO); "Q-Flex" a personal acupressure device (YES); "Hoppy Paws" stamp kits for simulating tracks left by holiday characters such as Santa's reindeer or the Easter Bunny (YES); Update on: Hanukkah Tree Topper (Episode 512)
106	13	"Week 12: Coffee Meets Bagel, SkinnyShirt, Doorman, Bantam Bagel"	January 9, 2015	611	7.73
Sharks: Mark, Barbara, Kevin, Lori, Robert "Coffee Meets Bagel" an online dating service that uses social media aspects to match singles (NO); "SkinnyShirt" a cross between a button-down shirt and a camisole specially designed to reduce bulk (NO); "Doorman" a service that re-delivers packages ordered online during hours convenient to the customer (YES); "Bantam Bagels" mini bagel balls filled with varieties of cream cheese (YES); Update on: Hamboards (Episode 504)
107	14	"Week 13: Scratch and Grain, Bottle Bright, Vestpakz, EvRewares"	January 13, 2015	607	7.48
Sharks: Mark, Barbara, Kevin, Lori, Robert "Scratch & Grain Baking Co." kits with premeasured natural ingredients for making homemade cookies (YES); "Bottle Bright" an effervescent tablet for cleaning water bottles and other drinking containers (YES); "Vestpakz" a combination backpack and vest for schoolchildren (NO); "Evrewares" reusable fabric sticker accessories such as humorous ties (YES); Update on: Spy Escape and Evasion (Episode 517)
108	15	"Week 14: Lumio, Napwell, TurboPup, Bello Verde"	January 16, 2015	619	8.64
Sharks: Mark, Daymond, Kevin, Lori, Robert "Lumio" an elegant lighting device that folds like an accordion (YES); "Napwell" a sleep mask that uses light to wake the user gradually (NO); "TurboPUP" complete canine meal bars (YES); "Bello Verde" a custom suit and clothing label (NO); Update on: Hold Your Haunches (Episode 523); Note: UFC champion Urijah Faber and actor Dean Cain make cameos to pitch for Bello Verde.
109	16	"Week 15: Victoria's Kitchen, Green Box, Tycoon Real Estate, PhoneSoap"	January 30, 2015	620	7.93
Sharks: Mark, Barbara, Kevin, Lori, Robert "Victoria's Kitchen" a line of almond water beverages (NO); "GreenBox" a pizza delivery box made out of recycled materials that can be broken down into plates and storage containers (YES); "Tycoon Real Estate" a crowd investing platform for real estate (NO); "Phonesoap" a device that uses ultraviolet light to remove bacteria from cell phones while charging them (YES); Update on: GrooveBook (Episode 513); Note: The GrooveBook update revealed the service was sold to Shutterfly, resulting in the largest deal in Shark Tank history.
110	17	"Week 16: Fresh Patch, Balm Chicky, Drain Strain, BedJet"	February 3, 2015	616	7.14
Sharks: Mark, Barbara, Kevin, Lori, Robert "Fresh Patch" a delivery service for patches of live grass for pet owners without yards (YES); "Balm Chicky Balm Balm" a lip balm container with a secondary tip for sharing with others without spreading germs (NO); "Drain Strain" a sink stopper that keeps drains free from hair clogs (YES); "BedJet" a climate control system for maintaining beds at a desired temperature (NO); Update on: Tom + Chee (Episode 426)
111	18	"Week 17: Himalayan Dog Chew, The Lip Bar, BevBoy, FunBites"	February 6, 2015	615	7.68
Sharks: Mark, Daymond, Kevin, Lori, Robert "Himalayan Dog Chew" (later renamed Himalayan Pet Supply) high nutrient dog treats made from specially processed yak cheese (NO); "The Lip Bar" a line of lipsticks in nontraditional colors (NO); "BeverageBoy" a beverage koozie that floats in water (YES); "FunBites" plastic devices for cutting food into fun shapes for children who are picky eaters (YES); Update on: Nuts 'n More (Episode 418)
112	19	"Week 18: Sseko Designs, Gold Rush Nugget Bucket, Boobypack, Lumi"	February 13, 2015	622	7.73
Sharks: Mark, Barbara, Kevin, Lori, Robert "Sseko Designs" handcrafted sandals with interchangeable accents (NO); "Gold Rush Nugget Bucket" a bucket and screen system to make panning for gold easier (YES); "BoobyPack" a sports bra with pockets for holding valuables (YES); "Lumi" a do-it-yourself process for printing photos onto clothing (NO); Update on: The Paint Brush Cover (Episode 522)
113	20	"Week 19: LuminAID, Taaluma Totes, Keen Home, Scholly"	February 20, 2015	617	8.43
Sharks: Mark, Daymond, Kevin, Lori, Robert "LuminAID" an inflatable, solar powered lighting device (YES); "Taaluma Totes" backpacks made from traditional fabrics from various countries (NO); "Keen Home" air vents for smart homes that can control air flow to individual areas (YES); "Scholly" an app that helps match students to scholarships (YES); Update on: Bottle Breacher (Episode 608); Note: This episode featured businesses that were started in college.
114	21	"Week 20: Coco Jack, BedRyder, Frill Clothing, and the Twin Z Pillow"	March 6, 2015	618	8.21
Sharks: Mark, Barbara, Kevin, Lori, Robert "Coco Jack" a set of tools for easier opening of Thai coconuts and extracting the meat from within (YES); "BedRyder" a set of seats with restraints to be installed in the bed of a pickup truck to allow passengers to ride in truck beds legally (NO); "Frill Clothing" designers and producers of custom clothing for college sororities (YES); "The Twin Z Pillow" a pillow that is specially designed to aid mothers of multiple children feed two children simultaneously (YES); Update on: Mo's Bows (Episode 526); Note: This episode featured products made in the USA.
115	22	"Week 21: Echo Valley Meats, EmazingLights, AquaVault, and Naja"	March 13, 2015	621	7.24
Sharks: Mark, Daymond, Kevin, Lori, Robert "Echo Valley Meats" the gourmet meat business founder returns to pitch his company again (YES); "EmazingLights" LED-powered light gloves for gloving in dance clubs (YES); "Aqua Vault" a locking container that can be attached to chairs and rails to secure valuables while swimming (YES); "Naja" a lingerie brand (NO); Update on: Pipsnacks (Episode 609); Note: This episode is the second to show a past entrepreneur return to the tank to pitch the same business (Echo Valley Meats, Episode 421).
116	23	"Week 22: BeeSweet Lemonade, BrandYourself, iCPooch, and The Home T"	March 20, 2015	628	7.50
Sharks: Mark, Daymond, Kevin, Lori, Robert "BeeSweet Lemonade" honey-sweetened lemonade with flaxseed (YES); "BrandYourself" software to improve search results for individuals and businesses (NO); "iCPooch" a device that allows two-way video chat between pets and their owners and can dispense treats (NO); "The Home T" a line of clothing and accessories focusing on the customer's home state or land (NO); Update on: "Barbara's All Star Retreat" Barbara takes some of her top investments [Grace and Lace (Episode 510), Pipsnacks (Episode 609), Villy Customs (Episode 313), Ryan's Barkery (Episode 426), Daisy Cakes (Episode 207), Cerebral Success (Episode 526), Cousin's Maine Lobster (Episode 406)] on a weekend retreat to her house in Utah.
117	24	"Week 23: Budsies, Bee Thinking, PullyPalz, Forus Athletics"	April 10, 2015	629	6.65
Sharks: Mark, Daymond, Kevin, Lori, Robert "Budsies" a company that creates custom plush toys based on children's drawings (NO); "Bee Thinking" beehives in various modern designs (NO); "PullyPalz" a pulley system to keep two pacifiers available to infants in case they lose one (YES); "Forus Athletics" workout and athletic shoes (NO); Update on: Q-Flex (Episode 612)
118	25	"Week 24: NeatCheeks, Melni Connectors, Beneath the Ink, PittMoss"	April 17, 2015	627	6.51
Sharks: Mark, Barbara, Kevin, Lori, Robert "NeatCheeks" wipes flavored with stevia for cleaning children's faces (YES); "Melni Connectors" a simpler connector for industrial electrical cables (YES); "Beneath the Ink" a service that integrates annotated supplementary information into e-books (NO); "PittMoss" an alternative to peat moss manufactured from recycled newspaper (YES); Update on: SunStaches (Episode 605)
119	26	"Week 25: ZinePak, SnagaStool, Buck Mason, Noene USA"	April 24, 2015	624	7.94
Sharks: Mark, Daymond, Kevin, Lori, Robert "ZinePak" exclusive merchandise and collectables for superfans of various entertainment media (YES); "SnagaStool" a barstool reservation app (NO); "Buck Mason" a line of basic men's clothing manufactured in the USA (NO); "Noene USA" ultra-thin shock absorbing shoe insoles (YES); Update on: Pork Barrel BBQ (Episode 106)
120	27	"Week 26: Zero Pollution Motors, The Paleo Diet Foods, World Record Striper Company, Frameri"	May 1, 2015	626	7.07
Sharks: Mark, Daymond, Kevin, Lori, Robert "Zero Pollution Motors" a compressed air car manufactured by Motor Development International (YES); "The Paleo Diet Foods" a meal bar designed for consumers of the paleo diet (NO); "World Record Striper Company" a rattle sinker that uses sound to attract fish, designed by the world record holder for the largest striped bass (YES); "Frameri" eyeglasses with interchangeable lenses and frames (NO); Update on: Heidi Ho (Episode 609); Note: Singer Pat Boone makes a cameo to pitch for Zero Pollution Motors; This episode was followed by the premiere of the Shark Tank companion spin-off series Beyond the Tank.
121	28	"Week 27: Zoom Interiors, Sunscreen Mist, SynDaver Labs, You Kick Ass"	May 8, 2015	625	6.68
Sharks: Mark, Barbara, Kevin, Lori, Robert "Zoom Interiors" an online interior design service (YES); "Sunscreen Mist" a booth for automated application of sunscreen (NO); "SynDaver Labs" synthetic human tissues and body parts for medical training and development (YES); "You Kick Ass" personalized, customizable action figures (YES); Update on: Squatty Potty (Episode 609)
122	29	"Season Finale: Shark Wheel, Gato Cafe, Sway Motorsports, Spikeball"	May 15, 2015	623	7.04
Sharks: Mark, Daymond, Kevin, Lori, Nick Woodman "Shark Wheel" a helical wheel for skateboards that is more maneuverable and has better grip (YES); "Gato Cafe" a cat café (NO); "Sway Motorsports" an electric commuter vehicle with characteristics of a motorcycle and an all-terrain vehicle (YES); "Spikeball" a variant of volleyball with a circular net in the middle of the field (YES); Update on: Season 6 Recap
