= Shark Tank season 7 =

Shark Tank
- Season 7
- No. of episodes: 29

Release
- Original network: ABC
- Original release: September 25, 2015 – May 20, 2016

Season chronology
- ← Previous; Season 6 Next → Season 8

This is a list of episodes from the seventh season of Shark Tank.

== Episodes ==
Actor Ashton Kutcher, music manager Troy Carter, and venture investor Chris Sacca appeared as guest sharks this season.

No. overall	No. in season	Title	Original release date	Prod. code	U.S. viewers (millions)
123	1	"Season 7 Premiere: Guest Shark Ashton Kutcher, The Beebo, ACTON, McClary Bros., SignalVault"	September 25, 2015	701	6.08
Sharks: Mark, Ashton Kutcher, Kevin, Lori, Robert "The Beebo" a baby bottle holder to make feeding easier (YES); "Acton" motorized roller skates that strap onto shoes (NO); "McClary Bros. Drinking Vinegars" a line of vinegars to be used in cocktails and soda mixers (NO); "SignalVault" a protector for credit cards to prevent them from being remotely scanned (YES); Update on: Pipsnacks (Episode 609) and Scratch & Grain Baking Co. (Episode 614)
124	2	"Week 2: O'Dang Hummus, Mikki Bey Eyelash Extensions, LOLIWARE, Splikity"	October 2, 2015	702	6.82
Sharks: Mark, Barbara, Kevin, Lori, Robert "O'Dang Hummus" a line of flavored hummuses and hummus-based salad dressing (YES); "Splikity" password manager software that can sync across multiple platforms and devices (NO); "Mikki Bey Eyelash Extensions" an eyelash extension service (NO); "Loliware" edible disposable cups with various flavors (YES); Update on: Red Dress Boutique (Episode 605)
125	3	"Week 3: Guest Shark Troy Carter, Foot Cardigan, Two Guys Bow Ties, ValPark, Nerdwax"	October 9, 2015	703	5.84
Sharks: Mark, Daymond, Kevin, Lori, Troy Carter "Foot Cardigan" a mail-order subscription service for fun and unique socks (YES); "ValPark Mobile" an app for valet and garage parking (NO); "The Two Guys Bowtie Company" wooden bowties, hats, and accessories (YES); "Nerdwax" a product to prevent eyeglasses and sunglasses from slipping off the nose (NO); Update on: "A Wonderful Wedding" Kevin O'Leary combines some of his investments [Bottle Breacher (Episode 608), Honeyfund (Episode 606), Wicked Good Cupcakes (Episode 422)] into the 'Something Wonderful' wedding platform.
126	4	"Week 4: Table 87, EZ-Pee-Z, Milk + Brookies, Dude Products"	October 16, 2015	706	5.85
Sharks: Mark, Barbara, Kevin, Lori, Robert "Table 87 Coal Oven Pizza" a flash-frozen New York-style pizza (YES); "EZ-Pee-Z" a toilet seat with a built-in potty training aid (NO); "Milk + Brookies" a combination of a brownie and a cookie (NO); "Dude Products" disposable toilet wipes marketed for men (YES); Update on: Roominate (Episode 602)
127	5	"Week 5: Switch Witch, Three Jerks Jerky, The Skinny Mirror, xCraft"	October 23, 2015	705	6.36
Sharks: Mark, Daymond, Kevin, Lori, Robert "Three Jerks Jerky" premium beef jerky made from filet mignon (YES); "The Skinny Mirror" a mirror that reflects a slightly slimmer reflection to boost self-confidence (NO); "Switch Witch" a children's book and doll to encourage children to trade their Halloween candy for a gift (NO); "XCraft" a personal use drone that can convert in-flight from hover mode to a fast forward-flight plane mode (YES); Update on: Bantam Bagels (Episode 611)
128	6	"Week 6: Rent Like a Champion, HotShot, Windcatcher, Stem Center USA"	October 30, 2015	704	6.16
Sharks: Mark, Chris Sacca, Kevin, Lori, Robert "Rent Like a Champion" a service to rent homes in collegiate sports towns on game weekends (YES); "HotShot" ready-to-drink, canned hot coffee (NO); "Windcatcher Technology" a valve that allows for quicker inflation of objects such as air mattresses (YES); "S.T.E.M. Center USA" a learning center for science, technology, engineering, and math and their associated technology (YES); Update on: S.W.A.G. Essentials (Episode 613)
129	7	"Week 7: Jimmy Kimmel and Guillermo, Wink Frozen Desserts, Saavy Naturals, Clean Cube, Simply Fit Board"	November 6, 2015	708	6.71
Sharks: Mark, Barbara, Kevin, Lori, Robert "Wink Frozen Desserts" a healthier alternative to ice cream that is dairy free, vegan, and just 100-calories per pint (NO); "Saavy Naturals" a line of beauty bars and lotions made from food-grade ingredients (YES); "Clean Cube" a digital doorman storage system for drop-off and pick-up of various delivery items (NO); "Simply Fit Board" a modified balance board for better workouts (YES); Update on: Tipsy Elves (Episode 512); Note: This episode concluded with a promotion for Jimmy Kimmel Live where the host returned to the tank to present another mock pitch to the sharks.
130	8	"Week 8: AfreSHeet, Unshrinkit, Grip Clean, PolarPro, and Sharks at the White House"	November 13, 2015	709	6.14
Sharks: Mark, Daymond, Kevin, Lori, Robert "AfreSHeet" a bedsheet with removable disposable layers for easier cleaning (NO); "Unshrinkit" a product to help unshrink wool garments (YES); "Grip Clean" a natural hand soap that uses dirt to remove heavy grease (YES); "PolarPro" a line of accessories and filters for digital photography and drones (YES); Update on: "Millennial Entrepreneurship Conference at the White House" Mark, Barbara, and Daymond celebrate Daymond being named a Presidential Ambassador for Global Entrepreneurship by President Obama. Note: This episode featured entrepreneurs who were millennials.
131	9	"Week 9: National Association of Bubble Soccer, Umano, Brazi Bites, SockTABS"	November 20, 2015	711	6.90
Sharks: Mark, Daymond, Kevin, Lori, Robert "Advanced Sports Technology" a league and licensing group for bubble soccer (NO); "Brazi Bites" a gluten-free Brazilian cheese bread (YES); "Umano" clothing featuring art by children with proceeds providing backpacks of school supplies (YES); "Socktabs" a connector to keep socks together to prevent loss during washing and drying (YES); Update on: Mensch on a Bench (Episode 614)
132	10	"Week 10: Leaux Racing Trikes, Glow Recipe, Sarah Oliver Handbags, Trunkster"	December 4, 2015	714	6.16
Sharks: Mark, Barbara, Kevin, Lori, Robert "Leaux Racing Trikes" a recumbent tricycle modified for speed and maneuverability (NO); "Glow Recipe" a line of skin treatment products with Korean influences (YES); "Sarah Oliver Handbags" designer handbags hand-knitted by senior citizens (YES); "Trunkster" a high-tech travel suitcase (YES); Update on: Happy Feet (Episode 523)
133	11	"Week 11: GeekMyTree, Beard Head, Lovepop, PiperWai"	December 11, 2015	712	6.00
Sharks: Mark, Barbara, Kevin, Lori, Robert "GeekMyTree" Christmas tree lights with smart technology for indoor light displays (YES); "Beard Head" novelty hats and beanies with detachable face masks that resemble beards (NO); "Lovepop" stationery and greeting cards with 3D pop-up art (YES); "PiperWai" a natural deodorant without chemicals (YES); Update on: "Daymond's Entrepreneur Workshop" Daymond invites some of his investments [SunStaches (Episode 605), Myself Belts (Episode 609), Cozy Bug (Episode 405), Bombas (Episode 601)] to a workshop focused on building online sales and social media presence. Note: Health and fitness guru/ Wellness Expert Noel Elie makes a cameo to demonstrate PiperWai while speaking up to help secure the deal.
134	12	"Week 12: Extreme Sandbox, ABS Pancakes, Total Tie Keep, FireAvert"	January 5, 2016	713	4.32
Sharks: Mark, Daymond, Kevin, Lori, Robert "ABS Protein Pancakes" a low-calorie, gluten-free, low-carb, high-protein line of pancake mixes (YES); "Extreme Sandbox" a service that allows clients to play with heavy-duty construction equipment (YES); "Total Tie Keep" a necktie accessory that maintains a neat, professional appearance (NO); "FireAvert" a device which shuts off power to a stove in case of a fire alarm (YES); Update on: Cousins Maine Lobster (Episode 406)
135	13	"Week 13: Spretz, ezpz, Hungry Harvest, Controlled Chaos"	January 8, 2016	715	5.76
Sharks: Mark, Barbara, Kevin, Lori, Robert "Sprëtz" a deodorizer for both breath and hands (NO), "Hungry Harvest" a service delivering less-appealing surplus produce at lower costs (YES); "Controlled Chaos" hair care products for very curly hair (YES); "Ezpz" an all-in-one placemat and plate with suction cups designed for use by toddlers (NO); Update on: LuminAID (Episode 620)
136	14	"Week 14: Hatch Baby, Village Scholarships, Fixed, Beard King"	January 15, 2016	707	5.64
Sharks: Mark, Chris Sacca, Kevin, Lori, Robert "Fixed" a smartphone app that helps overturn invalid parking and traffic violation tickets (YES); "Hatch Baby" (later renamed Hatch) a smart changing pad that syncs information on the infant to a smartphone (YES); "Village Scholarships" a crowdfunding approach to college scholarships (NO); "Beard King" a bib used while shaving to catch cut facial hairs (YES); Update on: Rugged Maniac (Episode 526)
137	15	"Week 15: Shefit, CO.ALITION, IcyBreeze, 2400 Expert"	January 29, 2016	716	6.81
Sharks: Mark, Daymond, Kevin, Lori, Robert "Shefit" an adjustable sports bra (YES); "CO.ALITION" a backpack with an integrated wireless hard drive that can charge mobile devices (NO); "IcyBreeze" (later rebranded as Solo Stove) a portable air conditioner built into a cooler (NO); "2400 Expert" a test prep resource for mastering the SAT test, created by a student who earned a perfect score (YES); Update on: Chapul (Episode 521)
138	16	"Week 16: R. Riveter, BearTek, Major Mom, Combat Flip Flops"	February 5, 2016	719	6.14
Sharks: Mark, Daymond, Kevin, Lori, Robert "R. Riveter" handbags made from upcycled military materials and manufactured by military spouses (YES); "BearTek" gloves that are capable of remotely controlling smartphones and similar devices through different finger gestures (NO); "Major Mom" a service to professionally organize cluttered rooms (NO); "Combat Flip Flops" a line of flip-flops, belts, and other accessories manufactured in war torn and volatile territories (YES); Update on: TurboPUP (Episode 615); Note: This episode featured entrepreneurs who were military veterans and family members.
139	17	"Week 17: SmartPlate, Bee Free Honee, Float Baby and MTailor"	February 12, 2016	721	6.73
Sharks: Mark, Daymond, Kevin, Barbara, Chris Sacca "SmartPlate" a plate with technology that analyzes meals and calculates their nutritional value (NO); "Bee Free Honee" an apple-based vegan alternative to honey (YES); "Float Baby" a flotation and massage facility for babies (NO); "MTailor" an app that takes body measurements and uses them to design custom clothing (NO); Update on: iLumi (Episode 525)
140	18	"Episode 18"	February 19, 2016	717	6.20
Sharks: Mark, Barbara, Kevin, Lori, Robert "Sworkit" a personalized customizeable workout app (YES); "Clean Sleep" a service to clean mattresses and associated bedding (NO); "TUTUblue" a line of full-body swimsuits to prevent sun damage (NO); "Nohbo" concentrated balls of shampoo and conditioner designed to reduce waste from plastic bottles (YES); Update on: SignalVault (Episode 701)
141	19	"Episode 19"	February 21, 2016	718	4.02
Sharks: Mark, Daymond, Kevin, Lori, Robert "Insta-Fire" a fire starter product with less chemicals (YES); "Custard Stand Food Products" hot dog chili (NO); "PRx Performance" weightlifting and gym equipment for use in small spaces (YES); "Rags to Raches" a line of one-piece rompers for children (YES); Update on: "Three Jerks Jerky" (Episode 705); Note: This episode featured products made in the USA.
142	20	"Episode 20"	February 26, 2016	720	5.45
Sharks: Mark, Barbara, Kevin, Lori, Robert "BetterBack" a back supporter which improves posture to relieve back pain (YES); '"Glacé Cryotherapy" a franchise featuring a whole-body cryotherapy device (YES); "Linka" a bicycle lock and alarm with smart technology (NO); "Teaspressa" concentrated tea shots made like espresso (NO); Update on: "PiperWai" (Episode 711)
143	21	"Episode 21"	March 11, 2016	727	5.74
Sharks: Mark, Daymond, Kevin, Lori, Robert "MobCraft Beer" a craft brewery that uses crowdsourcing to create their line of beers (NO); "Beloved Shirts" a line of humorous print clothing (NO); "IllumiBowl" a toilet seat light for nighttime bathroom use (YES); "Innovation Pet" a line of pet toys, houses, and accessories (YES); Update on: Lose 12 Inches In 12 Workouts (Episode 419)
144	22	"Episode 22"	March 18, 2016	725	6.13
Sharks: Mark, Daymond, Kevin, Lori, Robert "Beer Blizzard" a reusable device that attaches to the domed underside of canned beverages to keep the contents cold longer (YES); "Vengo" a slim digital vending machine for small items (YES); "The Good Promise" a line of fruit and vegetable smoothies and sauces (NO); "Wondercide" a natural and organic pesticide (YES); Update on: Lovepop (Episode 711)
145	23	"Episode 23"	April 8, 2016	728	5.42
Sharks: Mark, Daymond, Kevin, Lori, Robert "PrideBites Pet Products" customizable accessories for pets (YES); "TROBO" an interactive story-telling plush robot with updatable content (YES); "NoPhone" a fake phone for people with cell phone addiction (NO); "Coolbox" a toolbox with innovative features and integrated technology (YES); Update on: "Lori's Hardware Trade Show" Lori brings ten of her investments [Scrub Daddy (Episode 407), Drop Stop (Episode 420), ScreenMend (Episode 504), SignalVault (Episode 701), Readerest Specsecure (Episode 306), The Paint Brush Cover (Episode 522), Bambooee (Episode 518), Insta-Fire (Episode 720), Squatty Potty (Episode 609), FiberFix (Episode 506)] together at a trade show.
146	24	"Episode 24"	April 15, 2016	710	5.63
Sharks: Mark, Ashton Kutcher, Kevin, Lori, Robert "Petnostics" a chemical testing kit designed to test pet's urine for health issues (YES); "Frends" a designer brand of headphones with changeable styles (NO); "popSLATE" a smartphone case that adds a rear second screen with quick access to frequently desired information (NO); "Slyde Handboards" a small waveriding board that straps to the user's hand (YES); Update on: "Barbara's Retreat" Barbara takes some of her top investments [Tom + Chee (Episode 426), Pipsnacks (Episode 609), Villy Customs (Episode 303), Daisy Cakes (Episode 207), Ryan's Barkery (Episode 426), Cousin's Maine Lobster (Episode 406), PiperWai (Episode 711)] on a networking retreat in Mexico.
147	25	"Episode 25"	April 22, 2016	723	5.40
Sharks: Mark, Barbara, Kevin, Lori, Robert "The Drip Drop" an edible ring designed to catch drips from an ice cream cone (YES); "Jarrett & Raja Productions" a magic and music act for the Las Vegas strip (NO); "KidRunner" a stroller designed to be towed while jogging (NO); "InchBug" products for young children including personalized labels for bottles and a juice box holder that prevents squeezing (NO); Update on: Gameday Couture (Episode 611); Note: Marathon runner Max King makes a cameo to pitch for KidRunner
148	26	"Episode 26"	April 29, 2016	724	5.76
Sharks: Mark, Daymond, Kevin, Barbara, Chris Sacca "FashionTap" a social networking app to help sell fashion and beauty products (NO); "brellaBox" an umbrella rental service (NO); "My Fruity Faces" edible stickers for fruits and vegetables to encourage children to eat them (NO); "Brightwheel" an app geared toward early education of toddlers that gives parents better information on their education (YES); Update on: Keen Home (Episode 620)
149	27	"Episode 27"	May 6, 2016	729	5.42
Sharks: Mark, Barbara, Kevin, Lori, Robert "Dollop Gourmet" a non-GMO, vegan, and gluten-free frosting (YES); "CreaProducts" a hair cutting guide and associated beauty products (YES); "Yourself Expression" an interchangeable accessories company (NO); "The Spooner" a training device that simulates surfing, skateboarding, and snowboarding (YES); Update on: PhoneSoap (Episode 616)
150	28	"Episode 28"	May 13, 2016	722	5.30
Sharks: Mark, Daymond, Kevin, Lori, Robert "Camp No Counselors" a sleep away camp for adults (NO); "Extreme Vehicle Protection" a plastic cover to protect your car from extreme weather (YES); "Gladiator Lacrosse" practice equipment for lacrosse (NO); "VPcabs" a digital pinball machine (YES); Update on: MistoBox (Episode 423)
151	29	"Episode 29: Season Finale"	May 20, 2016	726	5.47
Sharks: Mark, Barbara, Kevin, Lori, Robert "Pete and Pedro" a line of men's hair styling products (YES); "PMS Bites" bite-sized snacks to aid women having premenstrual issues (NO); "Felt" an app that lets a user hand-write a message onto a greeting card and have it mailed for them (YES); "Pavlok" a device that uses small electrical shocks to break bad habits (NO); Update on: Season 7 Recap; Note: This episode features a past entrepreneur (Alpha M, Episode 402) returning to pitch a new business (Pete and Pedro). In a Shark Tank first, a deal was made for a different business than the one the entrepreneur entered the tank to pitch.
