= Shark Tank season 8 =

Shark Tank
- Season 8
- No. of episodes: 24

Release
- Original network: ABC
- Original release: September 23, 2016 – May 12, 2017

Season chronology
- ← Previous; Season 7 Next → Season 9

This is a list of episodes from the eighth season of Shark Tank.

== Episodes ==
Venture investor Chris Sacca returned as a guest shark in several episodes this season.

No. overall	No. in season	Title	Original release date	Prod. code	U.S. viewers (millions)
152	1	"Episode 1"	September 23, 2016	801	4.98
Sharks: Mark, Daymond, Barbara, Kevin, Lori, Robert "Fizzics" a device to enhance the head and the flavor of bottled or canned beers (YES); "Spoonful of Comfort" a delivery service of soup and sides for sick people (NO); "ISlide" fully customizable slide sandals (NO); "ReThink" content-filtering software that delays sending potentially cyberbullying messages so the user can reconsider (YES); Update on: 2400 Expert (Episode 716); Note: This is the first episode to have six sharks in the tank; NFL player Antonio Brown makes a cameo to pitch for ISlide.
153	2	"Episode 2"	September 30, 2016	802	5.02
Sharks: Mark, Daymond, Kevin, Lori, Robert "The Lapel Project" stick-on false lapels for jackets (YES); "GoodHangups" a magnetic device for hanging decorations on walls (YES); "Ice Age Meals" a delivery service of pre-made meals for the paleo diet (NO); "TactiBite Fish Call" a floating lure that creates sounds to attract fish (YES); Update on: Illumibowl (Episode 727)
154	3	"Episode 3"	October 7, 2016	804	4.86
Sharks: Mark, Barbara, Kevin, Lori, Robert "Raising Wild" fashionable bathing suits for more mature women (YES); "The Cookie Kahuna" Wally Amos from the Famous Amos cookie brand pitches a new line of cookies (NO); "TekDry" a machine to dry out water-damaged electronic devices (YES); "Night Runner 270" lights for shoes to be used by runners at night (YES); Update on: "7th Global Entrepreneurship Summit Hosted by President Obama" Daymond attends a summit for entrepreneurs hosted by Barack Obama.
155	4	"Episode 4"	October 14, 2016	803	5.19
Sharks: Mark, Daymond, Kevin, Lori, Robert "Solemates" a cap for high-heeled shoes to prevent them from sinking into grass (YES); "Atlantic Candy Company" a hollow chocolate candy with a toy inside that is legal to sell in the United States (NO); "Biem" a device that converts a stick of butter into a butter spray (YES); "Angels and Tomboys" scented body sprays and lotions marketed to tween girls (YES); Update on: The Natural Grip (Episode 608)
156	5	"Episode 5"	October 21, 2016	806	5.42
Sharks: Mark, Barbara, Kevin, Lori, Robert "SandiLake Clothing" a clothing line for children (NO); "Parker's Maple" a line of maple syrup, maple butter, and other associated products (NO); "SafeGrabs" silicone mats for multi-purpose kitchen use (YES); "SiliDog" pet identification tags made out of silicone (YES); Profile: "Kevin O'Leary" Kevin tells his story of how he came to business success.
157	6	"Episode 6"	October 28, 2016	805	4.41
Sharks: Mark, Daymond, Kevin, Lori, Robert "Joyce's Lulu Bang" a line of gourmet marmalade and sauces (NO); "unPack" a service for travelers that delivers pre-packed clothing to hotels (NO); "Sunscreenr" a device to view the effectiveness of sunscreen (YES); "Potato Parcel" a gag gift delivery service of a message written on a potato (YES); Update on: Grace and Lace (Episode 510)
158	7	"Episode 7"	November 4, 2016	808	5.22
Sharks: Mark, Daymond, Barbara, Kevin, Lori, Robert "Eco Flower" artificial flowers made from recycled materials (YES); "The Style Club" women's fashions marketed through videos and social media (YES); "Safe Catch" a machine that can test the mercury content in tuna (NO); "#besomebody" an app to facilitate experiential learning by booking live experiences with mentors and experts in various activities (NO); Update on: Wicked Good Cupcakes (Episode 422); Note: American Ninja Warrior competitor Travis Brewer and professional soccer player Kristine Lilly make cameos to pitch for #besomebody.
159	8	"Episode 8"	November 11, 2016	809	5.43
Sharks: Mark, Barbara, Kevin, Lori, Chris Sacca "Milk Snob" a soft baby stroller and car seat cover that doubles as a nursing cover (YES); "Jack's Stands & Marketplaces" a service that provides stands and training for young entrepreneurs to sell their products (YES); "Chi'lantro" a Korean BBQ food truck and restaurant (YES); "Toor" a lockbox connected to an app that allows a real estate buyer quicker access to the property (YES); Update on: Rent Like a Champion (Episode 704)
160	9	"Episode 9"	November 18, 2016	810	5.19
Sharks: Mark, Daymond, Kevin, Lori, Robert "PupBox" a subscription box service for puppy owners (YES); "Barbell Apparel" men's clothing tailored for active wear (NO); "ENERGYbits" algae tablets to increase energy and focus (NO); "Line Cutterz" a finger ring with a cutter for fishing line (YES); Update on: Bantam Bagels (Episode 611)
161	10	"Episode 10"	December 2, 2016	807	5.20
Sharks: Mark, Robert, Kevin, Lori, Chris Sacca "Inboard Technology" an electric skateboard company (YES); "PetPlate" a delivery service of freshly cooked pet food (NO); "Nootrobox" (later renamed Ketone-IQ) chewable coffee cubes (NO); "Nomiku" a home version of a sous-vide cooker (YES); Update on: Simply Fit Board (Episode 708)
162	11	"Episode 11"	December 9, 2016	812	4.91
Sharks: Mark, Barbara, Kevin, Lori, Robert "Sealed by Santa" a service to send letters and packages to kids from Santa Claus (YES); "PolyGlide" a synthetic ice material for skating at home (NO); "Digiwrap" customizable gift wrap and gift bags (YES); "Hand Out Gloves" gloves with a removable finger portion to easily allow bare-handed tasks (YES); Profile: "Mark Cuban" Mark tells his story of how he came to business success.
163	12	"Episode 12"	January 6, 2017	813	5.78
Sharks: Mark, Daymond, Kevin, Lori, Robert "PDX Pet Design" a line of cat toys and care products (NO); "Basic Outfitters" a service providing drawers of men's clothing basics (NO); "Victory Coffees" a line of organic, fair trade coffee (NO); "Naturally Perfect Dolls" dolls with features representing diverse cultures and ethnicities (YES); Update on: Drain Strain (Episode 617)
164	13	"Episode 13"	January 13, 2017	811	5.86
Sharks: Mark, Barbara, Kevin, Lori, Robert "Grease Bags" disposable, compostable bags for disposing of household grease (YES); "Pinblock" children's building blocks that are flexible (YES); "Mama's Milk Box" a subscription box service of women's clothing for nursing mothers (NO); "NicePipes Apparel" arm and legwarmers made from yoga workout material (NO); Profile: "Daymond John" Daymond tells his story of how he came to business success.
165	14	"Episode 14"	January 27, 2017	815	5.97
Sharks: Mark, Barbara, Kevin, Lori, Chris Sacca "Chirps" corn chips enhanced with cricket protein (YES); "Vibes" high-fidelity earplugs specially designed for use at concerts (NO); "Popup Play" play sets custom designed by children via a tablet (YES); "Getaway" a rental service of camping sites with tiny houses (NO); Profile: "Barbara Corcoran" Barbara tells her story of how she came to business success.
166	15	"Episode 15"	February 3, 2017	814	5.68
Sharks: Mark, Daymond, Kevin, Lori, Robert "The Kooler" an insulated water cooler with containers for secondary beverages (YES); "Little Nomad" stylish foam children's play mats (NO); "RinseKit" a portable shower system (YES); "DBest Products" a line of carriers and portable carts (YES); Update on: Tom + Chee (Episode 426)
167	16	"Episode 16"	February 10, 2017	816	5.81
Sharks: Mark, Daymond, Kevin, Lori, Robert "Tranquilo" a vibrating mat for calming crying babies (YES); "Doc Spartan" an all natural first aid ointment (YES); "Peaceful Fruits" natural fruit snacks made with açai (NO); "Fire Fighter Turn Out Bags" bags made from used gear worn by firefighters (YES); Update on: R. Riveter (Episode 716)
168	17	"Episode 17"	February 17, 2017	817	5.22
Sharks: Mark, Robert, Kevin, Lori, Chris Sacca "Toymail" a plush toy that allows children to send voice messages to approved contacts (YES); "Edn Wallgarden" (later renamed Edn Tech) an indoor planter that uses smart technology to help grow the plants (NO); "Hotels by Day" an app for booking day-use hotel rooms (NO); "Bitsbox" a subscription box service that teaches kids computer coding (NO); Update on: Insta-fire (Episode 719)
169	18	"Episode 18"	February 24, 2017	818	5.86
Sharks: Mark, Daymond, Kevin, Lori, Robert "Sand Cloud" beach towels supporting ocean sustainability (YES); "Ora Organic" plant-based nutritional supplements (NO); "DartDrones" drone pilot training courses (YES); "The Elephant Pants" an elephant pants clothing line supporting elephant preservation (YES); Update on: Bombas (Episode 601); Note: This episode was followed by a special edition of 20/20 celebrating Shark Tank reaching $100 million in deals featuring behind the scenes of production and updates on past businesses from the show.
170	19	"Episode 19"	March 3, 2017	819	6.08
Sharks: Mark, Barbara, Kevin, Lori, Robert "The Sleep Styler" hair rollers that dry and style overnight (YES); "Blendtique Wine Company" a kit for customers to create personalized wine blends (YES); "MealEnders" natural lozenges designed to help with weight management (NO); "Rareform" backpacks and bags made from recycled billboards (YES); Profile: "Robert Herjavec" Robert tells his story of how he came to business success.
171	20	"Episode 20"	April 7, 2017	822	4.88
Sharks: Mark, Daymond, Kevin, Lori, Robert "Apollo Peak" a wine-like beverage for cats and dogs (YES); "Seedsheet" a sheet of weed-blocking fabric embedded with dissolvable pouches of seeds and soil for easily growing vegetables and herbs (YES); "CropSticks" bamboo chopsticks with a built-in rest (NO); "Under the Weather" weatherproof pop-up pods to be used when watching (YES); Update on: Dude Products (Episode 704)
172	21	"Episode 21"	April 14, 2017	823	4.38
Sharks: Mark, Barbara, Kevin, Lori, Chris Sacca "Guard Llama" a portable remote that activates a personal emergency service (YES); "Flag" a free photo printing service that prints ads on the back of the photos (NO); "Validated" an app that earns credit toward covering transportation costs when shopping at physical stores (NO); "Guardian Bikes" children's bicycles with an improved braking system (YES); Update on: Bubba's Boneless Ribs (Episode 511)
173	22	"Episode 22"	April 21, 2017	820	4.58
Sharks: Mark, Daymond, Kevin, Lori, Robert "Goverre" a spill-proof portable wine glass (YES); "See Rescue Streamer" a large streamer used as an emergency signal device (NO); "BootyQueen Apparel" a fitness fashion line that accents a woman's rear end (YES); "Loctote Industrial Bag Co." a drawstring pack that is cut-resistant and has security features (YES); Update on: PRx Performance (Episode 719)
174	23	"Episode 23"	May 5, 2017	824	4.40
Sharks: Mark, Daymond, Kevin, Lori, Robert "Thompson Tee" undershirts designed to block underarm sweat (YES); "Wallet Buckle" a belt buckle that holds credit cards (NO); "Rumi Spice" saffron imported from Afghanistan (YES); "Peoples Design" a mixing bowl with a built-in scoop (YES); Update on: Lovepop (Episode 711)
175	24	"Episode 24"	May 12, 2017	826	4.01
Sharks: Mark, Barbara, Kevin, Lori, Robert "Wine & Design" painting classes with wine served (YES); "Rocketbook" a notebook that can scan contents to cloud services via an app and can be erased by being microwaved (NO); "Laid Brand" hair-care products made with pheromones (NO); "Bridal Buddy" a functional slip worn under a wedding gown that allows the wearer to use the restroom on their own (YES); Update on: Season 8 Recap
