= Phragmites =

Phragmites Temporal range: Campanian–Recent
- Phragmites australis flowerheads in late summer, Hertfordshire, England

Scientific classification
- Kingdom: Plantae
- Clade: Tracheophytes
- Clade: Angiosperms
- Clade: Monocots
- Clade: Commelinids
- Order: Poales
- Family: Poaceae
- Subfamily: Arundinoideae
- Tribe: Molinieae
- Subtribe: Moliniinae
- Genus: Phragmites; Adans.

Synonyms
- Czernya C.Presl; Miphragtes Nieuwl.; Oxyanthe Steud.; Trichoon Roth; Xenochloa Licht. ex Roem. & Schult.

Genus of grasses commonly known as reeds

Phragmites (/fræɡˈmaɪtiːz/) is a genus of six species of large perennial reed grasses found in wetlands throughout temperate and tropical regions of the world.

== Taxonomy ==
The Plants of the World Online database, maintained by Kew Gardens in London, accepts the following six species:

- Phragmites australis (Cav.) Trin. ex Steud. – The cosmopolitan common reed
- Phragmites bhattacharyyae Kandwal, Uniyal & Rajesw. – Western Himalaya
- Phragmites frutescens H.Scholz – eastern Mediterranean region (Albania east to Turkey, south to Jordan)
- Phragmites japonicus Steud. – Japan, Korea, Ryukyu Islands, Russian Far East
- Phragmites karka (Retz.) Trin. ex Steud. – tropical Africa, southern Asia, Australia, some Pacific Islands, invasive in New Zealand
- Phragmites mauritianus Kunth – central + southern Africa, Madagascar, Mauritius

== Wildlife in reed beds ==
Eurasian bitterns are very closely tied to large Phragmites australis reedbeds with good water levels

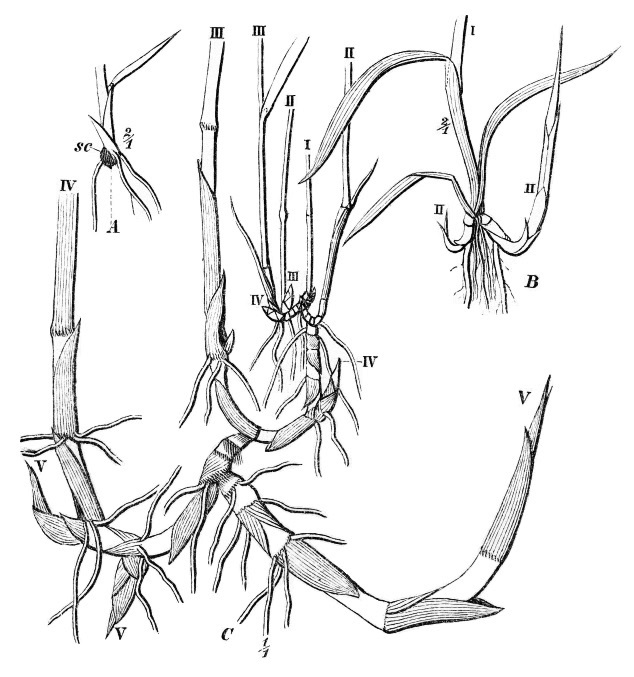
Three Phragmites australis seedlings: A.) very young, B.) juvenile, C.) the oldest (3–4 months). Roman numerals denote different shoot generations. Sc=scutellum. (From Om Skudbygning, Overvintring og Foryngelse by Eugen Warming, 1884)

Phragmites stands can provide food and shelter resources for a large number of birds, insects, and other animals. Habitat benefits are often optimal when stands are thinner, and management of stands may promote more suitable habitat benefits. Some evidence suggests that a short term management rotation of 1–2 years could maximise bird and invertebrate numbers, while others have recommended 4 to 15 year rotations to maximise benefits, depending on the target species for conservation. Carefully controlled grazing by large mammals like horses can provide substantial benefits for some reedbed specialist species such as moustached warbler and great reed warbler by opening up senescent reedbeds and reinvigorating reed growth.

== Uses ==
=== Ecosystem services ===
P. australis provides ecosystem services such as nutrient sequestration, soil stabilisation, and waste treatment. It has been suggested that due to its resilience to climate change impacts, P. australis may provide beneficial ecosystem services that need to be considered in coastal ecosystems, even where it is considered an invasive species. Others have argued that the ecosystem services lost as a result of invasion outweigh the benefits gained and managers need to be responsive to invasion control.

=== Cultivation ===
P. australis is cultivated as an ornamental plant in aquatic and marginal settings such as pond- and lakesides. Its aggressive colonisation means it must be sited with care.

=== Phytoremediation water treatment ===
Phragmites australis is one of the main wetland plant species used for phytoremediation water treatment.

Waste water from lavatories and greywater from kitchens is routed to an underground septic tank-like compartment where the solid waste is allowed to settle out. The water then trickles through a constructed wetland or artificial reed bed, where bioremediation bacterial action on the surface of roots and leaf litter removes some of the nutrients in biotransformation. The water is then suitable for irrigation, groundwater recharge, or release to natural watercourses.

=== Thatching ===
Reed is used in many areas for thatching roofs. In the British Isles, common reed used for this purpose is known as Norfolk reed or water reed. However, "wheat reed" and "Devon reed", also used for thatching, are not in fact reed, but long-stemmed wheat straw.

=== Music ===
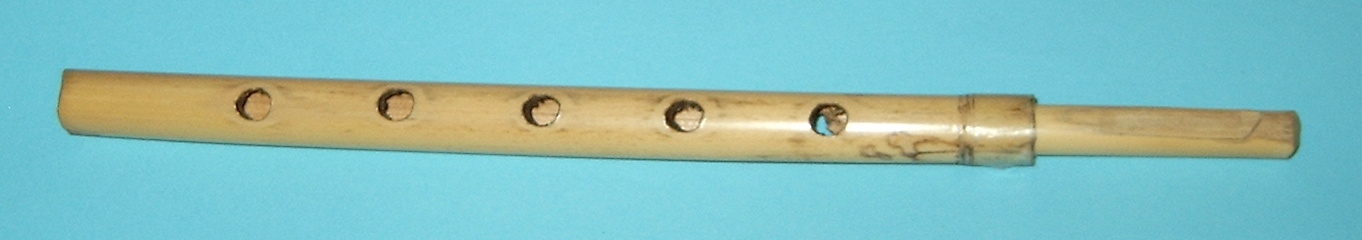
Sipsi

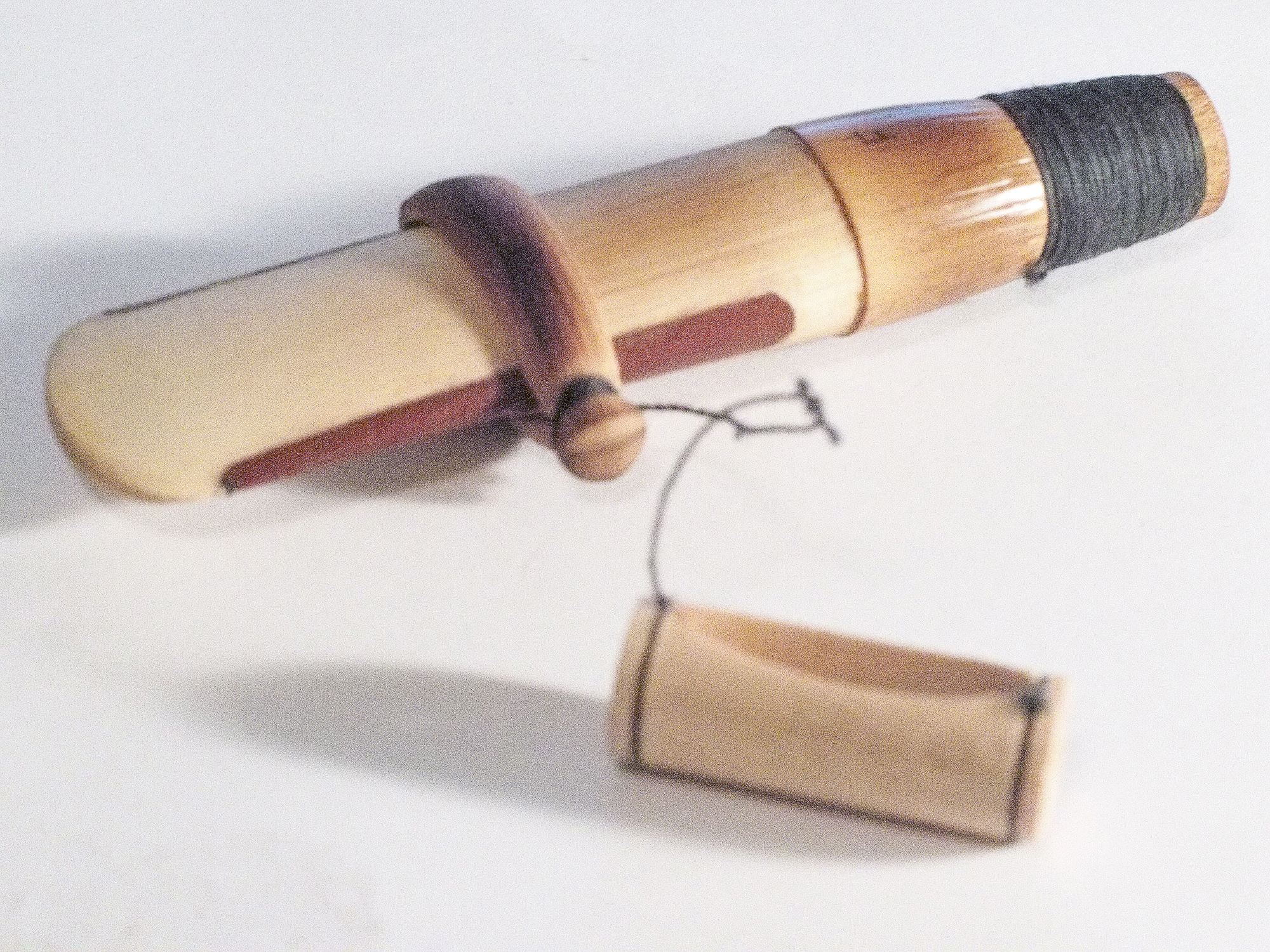
The duduk or mey mouthpiece is a flattened piece of giant reed Arundo donax, a relative of common reed, which is itself flattened to make the zurna reed.

In Middle East countries Phragmites is used to create a small instrument similar to the clarinet called a sipsi, with either a single, as in the picture, or double pipes as in bagpipes. The reed of the zurna is made from the common reed which is flattened after removing its brittle outer glaze and the loose inner membrane, and after softening it by wetting. The result is a double reed with an elliptical opening that vibrates by closing and opening at a high speed. This is not to be confused with other double reeds like that of the oboe which uses two reeds made from the giant reed leaning against each other.

=== Food ===
The leaves, roots, seeds and stems of phragmites are edible. Young shoots can be cooked or eaten raw just like bamboo shoots. The young stems, "while still green and fleshy, can be dried and pounded into a fine powder, which when moistened is roasted like marshmallows". The seeds and rhizomes "can be ground into flour or made into gruel". In Japan, young leaves are dried, ground, and then mixed with cereal flour to make dumplings. Grazing on phragmites by large-bodied domestic herbivores, such as cows, horses, sheep, and goats, can effectively control the plant and provide a reciprocal positive benefit for humans by generating meat, milk, leather, and wool etc.

=== Other uses ===
Some other uses of Phragmites australis and other reeds in various cultures include baskets, mats, reed pen tips (qalam), and paper. Beekeepers can use reeds to make nesting sites for solitary bees.

In the Philippines, Phragmites is known by the local name tambo. Reed stands flower in December, and the blooms are harvested and bundled into whisk brooms called "walis". Hence the common name of household brooms is walis tambo.

Reeds have been used to make arrows and weapons such as spears for hunting game.

== Invasiveness and control ==
Some Phragmites, when introduced by accident or intent, spread rapidly. In tropics and subtropics, Phragmites karka is an abundant invasive species. In the United States, prior to 1910, only a few areas in the Northeast contained non-native haplotypes of Phragmites australis. However, by 1960 non-native haplotypes were found in samples taken from coast to coast. Today, in some places like Michigan, Phragmites australis (haplotype M) has become the dominant haplotype. The problem is invasive non-native Phragmites australis quickly spread through marshes and wetland areas. They replace native plants, deny fish and wildlife nutrients and space; block access to the water for swimming, fishing and other recreation endeavors; spoil shoreline views; and pose a fire hazard. Phragmites also alters wetland biogeochemistry and affects both floral and faunal species assemblages, including potentially reducing nitrogen and phosphorus availability for other plants.

Phragmites can drive out competing vegetation in two main ways. Their sheer height and density can deprive other plants of sunlight and the chemicals they produce when decaying reduce the germination of competing seeds. Among other effects, the monocultures that result from invasion decrease spatial and temporal habitat heterogeneity and increase avian homogeneity.

A previously sandy beach in Hanko, Finland, now colonised by Phragmites reeds

Recognising non-native forms of Phragmites early in its invasion increases the opportunity for successful eradication dramatically. Once it has become established, removal by hand is nearly impossible. The seeds or rhizomes can quickly lead to a new dense stand. Most rhizomes are in the top 15-30 cm of soil but can go up to a few metres too. That is why sometimes they are visible and may need Environmental DNA testing to confirm their presence. Chemical treatment is by far the most used method in North America. The two most common active ingredients in herbicides for Phragmites control are glyphosate and imazapyr. It is important to select the proper herbicide for the location. Further, even the proper herbicide can lead to unintended consequences since a large amount of decaying dead plant material can depress oxygen levels in the water and kill all the fish in a pond or small lake. Some success has also been obtained using goats to graze on Phragmites, controlled burns, and native wild rice crops. When cutting under water, cutting and then flooding, or burning and then flooding, it is important that the entire Phragmites stand is completely submerged so that the plants cannot obtain oxygen.

Biological controls have been suggested to be the most likely control method to succeed, and biocontrols have been approved for introduction in North America. Unfortunately, biocontrols may destroy the native subspecies population as well. Biocontrol using two species of moth larvae (Lenisa geminipuncta and Archanara neurica) is being investigated in Ontario.

== Gallery ==
Phragmites australis in flower. Hertfordshire, England.

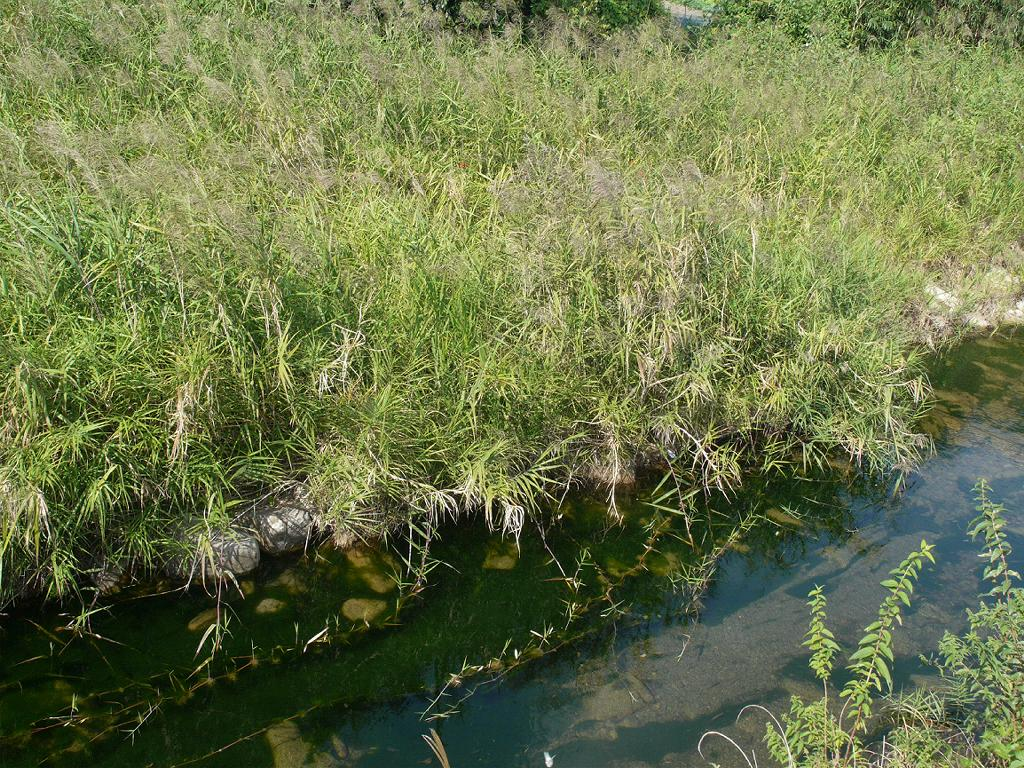
Phragmites japonicus has sparse, open flowerheads. Wakayama prefecture, Japan.

Phragmites mauritianus, a very tall-growing species, in Madagascar

Flowering stand of Phragmites australis in the Camargue, France

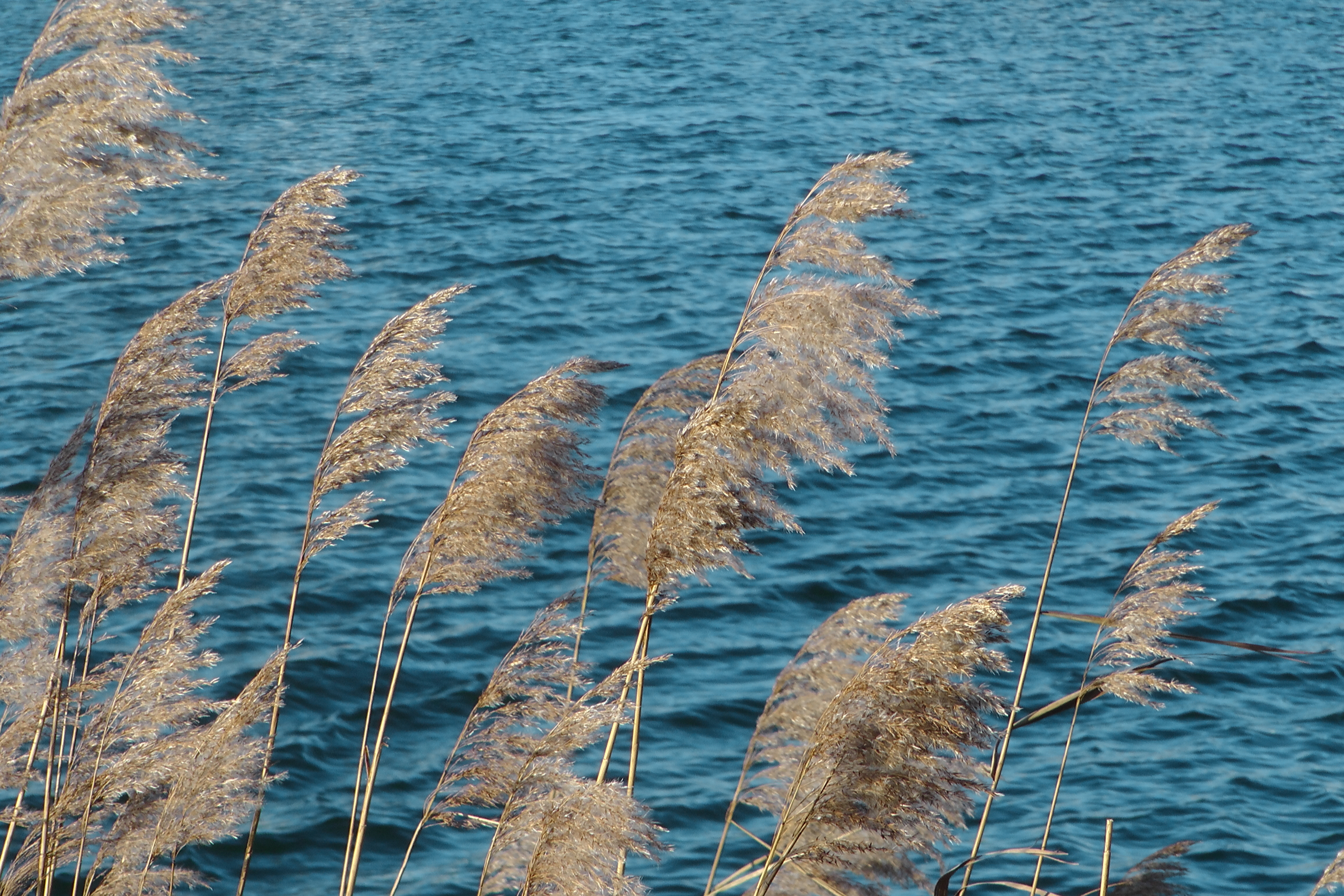
Phragmites australis in winter in Amsterdam, Netherlands

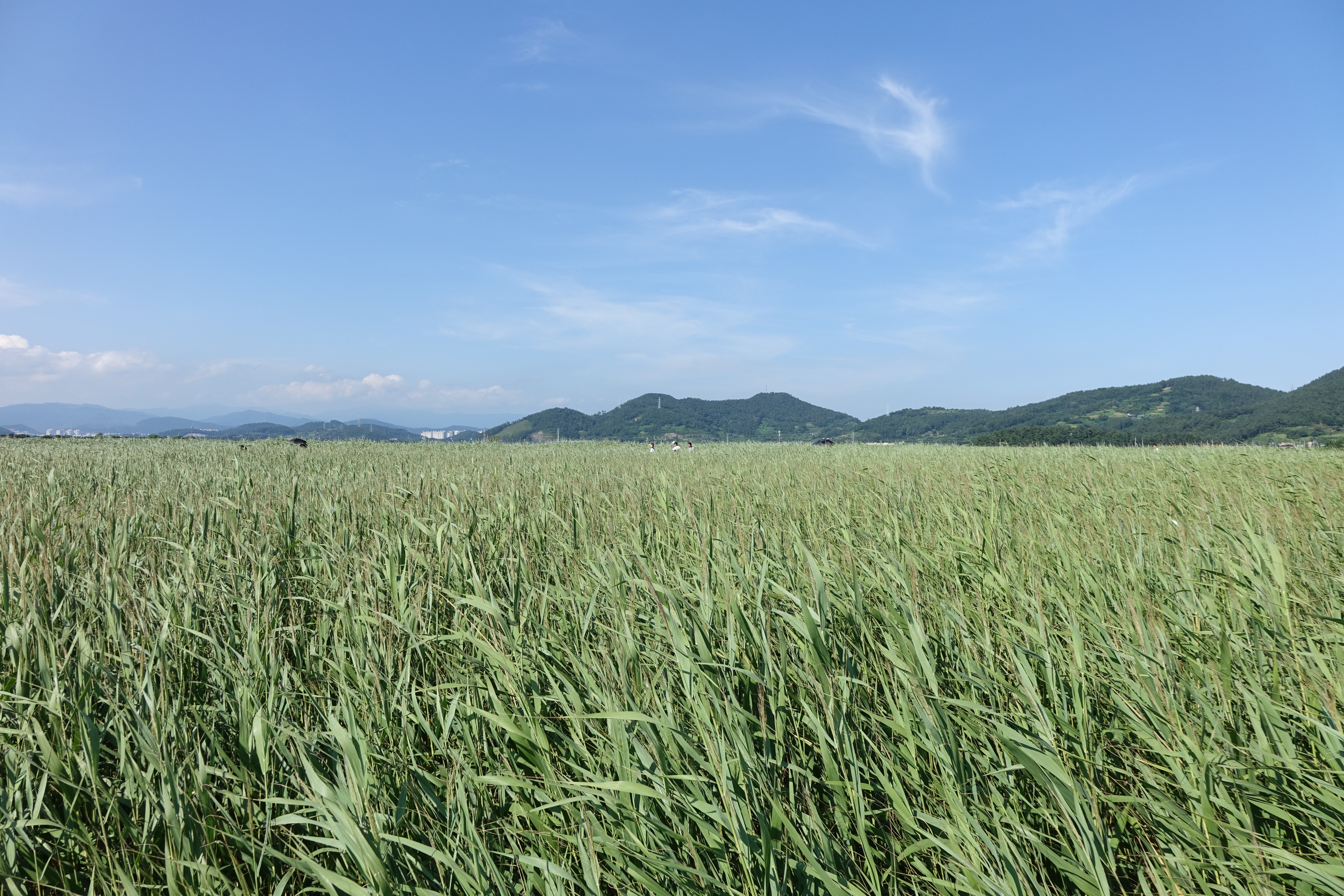
Phragmites australis in South Korea

== See also ==
- Constructed wetland
- Meadow
  - Fen Meadow
- Phytoremediation
- Reed bed
- Reed boat
- Reed fields
- Reed mat
