= Zack Fleishman =

American tennis player

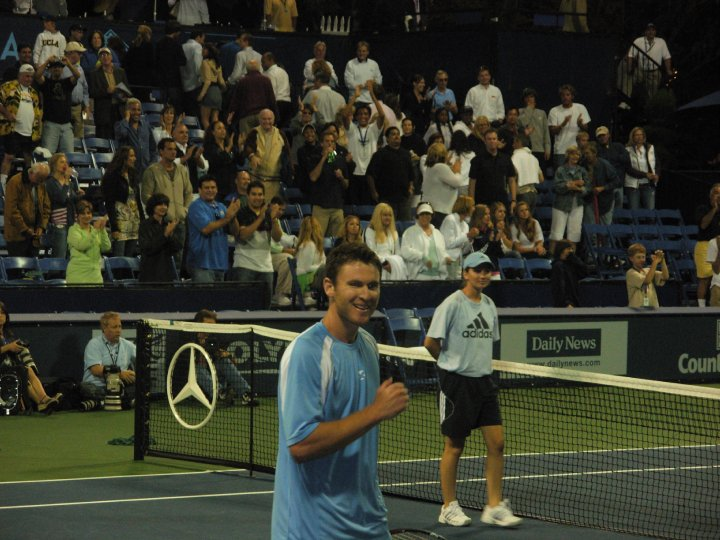
- Zack Fleishman defeats world #6 Fernando González at UCLA's Countrywide Classic in 2007
- Country (sports): United States
- Residence: California
- Born: March 17, 1980 (age 46) Santa Monica, California
- Height: 6 ft 2 in (1.88 m)
- Turned pro: 2000
- Retired: 2011
- Plays: Right-handed (two-handed backhand)
- Prize money: $381,160

Singles
- Career record: 7–17 (at ATP Tour-level, Grand Slam-level, and in Davis Cup)
- Career titles: 0
- Highest ranking: No. 127 (November 5, 2007)

Grand Slam singles results
- Australian Open: 2R (2007)
- French Open: Q1 (2004, 2006, 2007)
- Wimbledon: 1R (2007)
- US Open: Q3 (2003)

Doubles
- Career record: 2–4 (at ATP Tour-level, Grand Slam-level, and in Davis Cup)
- Career titles: 0
- Highest ranking: No. 254 (June 24, 2002)

Grand Slam doubles results
- Wimbledon: 2R (2006)
- US Open: Q2 (2000)

Zachary Rodin Fleishman (born March 17, 1980) is an American professional tennis player.

== Personal life ==
Fleishman was born in Santa Monica, and attended UCLA for one year before turning pro. He is currently the Chief Operating Officer at Shark Wheel, a company that reinvented the wheel into a sine wave-shaped design.

== Tennis career ==
Fleishman began playing tennis at the age of 8. At the age of 18, he played one season (1998–99) of collegiate tennis at the University of California at Los Angeles (UCLA), at the No. 2 position. That year Fleishman helped UCLA to the No. 1 ranking in the country, and to the final of the National Collegiate Athletic Association championships. In the ITF junior world rankings, he reached No. 18 in singles in 1998. After one year of competing on the collegiate level, Fleishman opted to turn professional in 2000.

He has won seven professional singles titles (and numerous doubles titles) in his career, starting with back-to-back satellite wins in El Salvador on hard court, followed by a win in Honduras on red clay. Fleishman then won back-to-back titles again, this time in his native California, winning two futures events in Redding and Chico (he also won the doubles title). Later, he was able to establish himself on the challenger circuit, winning a US$25,000 event in Ecuador on red clay and then a US$50,000 event in Vietnam on hard court. This propelled his ranking to 11th in the United States and World # 127. In 2008, Zack added another professional tournament victory to his resume winning the Costa Mesa Tennis Futures.

In his career Fleishman notably defeated Fernando González, David Nalbandian, Vince Spadea, Agustín Calleri, Mardy Fish, Robby Ginepri, Daniel Nestor, Tomáš Berdych, Kei Nishikori, Kevin Anderson, Santiago Giraldo, Yen-Hsun Lu, Denis Istomin, Nicolas Mahut, and Joachim Johansson.

=== 2006 ===
In 2006, Fleishman qualified for his first Grand Slam event: the Australian Open. He won three qualifying matches and then drew world No. 85 Dick Norman of Belgium. Fleishman rallied from two sets down to force a fifth set. However, Fleishman was unable to capitalize on his momentum, and lost the fifth set and the match.

=== 2007 ===
In 2007, Fleishman again qualified for the Australian Open. This time, he defeated World # 26 Agustín Calleri of Argentina in the first round, before falling to Australian Wayne Arthurs in the second round.

The same year, Fleishman won three matches and qualified at Wimbledon, where he faced World No. 10 Tommy Haas. On July 17, 2007, Fleishman achieved his first victory over a top-ten player, defeating world No. 6 Fernando González, in the first round of the Los Angeles Tennis Center's Countrywide Classic. He proceeded to beat fellow American Robert Kendrick, in the second round, compiling his first ever back-to-back wins in an Association of Tennis Professionals event. In the quarterfinals, however, Fleishman fell to the eventual tournament champion Radek Štěpánek.

=== 2008 ===
In September 2008, Fleishman won the USA F23 in California, beating Michael McClune in the finals in three sets. He and McClune partnered to win the doubles in the tournament, dropping only one set along the way.
