= Shark Tank season 9 =

Shark Tank
- Season 9
- No. of episodes: 24

Release
- Original network: ABC
- Original release: October 1, 2017 – February 25, 2018

Season chronology
- ← Previous; Season 8 Next → Season 10

This is a list of episodes from the ninth season of Shark Tank.

== Episodes ==
Guest sharks this season include Spanx founder Sara Blakely, Virgin Group founder Richard Branson, brand marketer Rohan Oza, TV personality Bethenny Frankel, and former MLB star Alex Rodriguez.

The series moved to Sunday nights for this season. After the cancellation of Ten Days in the Valley, and with the March arrival of ABC's reboot of American Idol, the majority of episodes aired back-to-back in two-hour blocks.

No. overall	No. in season	Title	Original release date	Prod. code	U.S. viewers (millions)
176	1	"Episode 1"	October 1, 2017	903	5.12
Sharks: Daymond, Richard Branson, Mark, Lori, Robert "Locker Board" a smaller skateboard that can fit inside a locker (YES); "Wyp Aviation" a wakeboard style vehicle pulled behind an airplane (NO); "Sierra Madre Research" a hammock tent (YES); "Simple Habit" a meditation app (NO); Profile: "Richard Branson" Richard tells his story of how he came to business success. This is the first episode without Kevin O'Leary.
177	2	"Episode 2"	October 1, 2017	904	5.12
Sharks: Robert, Barbara, Mark, Lori, Rohan Oza "The Seventy2" a bag of tools and equipment for emergencies (YES); "Jackson's Honest" snack foods made with coconut oil (YES); "Qball" a wireless microphone inside a ball (YES); "Trippie" an app for navigating large airports (NO); Profile: "Rohan Oza" Rohan tells his story of how he came to business success.
178	3	"Episode 3"	October 8, 2017	906	4.73
Sharks: Robert, Barbara, Kevin, Lori, Mark "Fidgetland" fidget spinners and rings that reduce anxiety and stress (YES); "Enso" flexible silicone wedding bands (YES); "Third Wave Water" a mineral concoction for better coffee brewing quality (YES); "Tangle Pets" kid-friendly hairbrush (YES); Update on: The Sleep Styler (Episode 819)
179	4	"Episode 4"	October 15, 2017	901	4.64
Sharks: Alex Rodriguez, Barbara, Kevin, Lori, Mark "Delighted By" dessert hummus (YES); "Sole Mender" stainless steel foot massage roller (NO); "Ice Shaker" stainless steel insulated protein shake bottle (YES); "Benjilock" fingerprint-technology padlocks (YES) Profile: "Alex Rodriguez" tells his story of how he came to baseball and business success. Note: The "Ice Shaker" was pitched by former NFL fullback Chris Gronkowski. His brothers Gordie, Dan, Rob, and Glenn assisted in the presentation.
180	5	"Episode 5"	October 22, 2017	825	4.29
Sharks: Mark, Daymond, Kevin, Lori, Robert "Ash and Anvil" (renamed Ash & Erie) shirts for short people (YES); "Mirmir" portable photo booth (YES); "Kwik-Hang" curtain rod brackets (NO); "Human Bobber" multi-functional personal flotation device (YES) Update on: Safegrabs (Episode 806)
181	6	"Episode 6"	October 29, 2017	902	3.51
Sharks: Mark, Sara Blakely, Kevin, Lori, Daymond "Novel Effect" storybook app with voice effects (YES); "Father Figure" paternity clothing line for dads (NO); "DrainWig" hair catcher for shower drains (YES); "Brazyn Life" collapsible foam roller (YES) Profile: "Sara Blakely" Sara tells her story of how she came to business success. Note: The "Brazyn Life" was pitched by former NFL tight end Nate Lawrie.
182	7	"Episode 7"	October 29, 2017	821	3.18
Sharks: Mark, Barbara, Kevin, Lori, Chris Sacca "WaiveCar" all electric car-sharing service with advertising signage (YES), "Pearachute" kid-activity subscription service (YES); "GeoOrbital" electric bike wheel (NO); "Qeepsake" text message service that tracks baby milestones (NO); Update on: Hatch Baby (Episode 707)
183	8	"Episode 8"	November 5, 2017	905	4.03
Sharks: Mark, Bethenny Frankel, Kevin, Lori, Robert "No Mo-stache" portable mustache removal kit (YES), "SnoofyBee" clean hands baby changing pad (YES), "Dreampad" sound-emitting pillows for better sleep (NO), "Snarky Tea" tea blends for specific moods (YES) Profile: "Bethenny Frankel" Bethenny tells her story of how she came to business success.
184	9	"Episode 9"	November 5, 2017	914	3.32
Sharks: Alex Rodriguez, Barbara, Kevin, Lori, Mark "Brilliant Pad" self-cleaning puppy pad and dog potty (YES), "Bravo" tipping app (YES), "Hoop Maps" app that finds the nearest basketball games (NO), "GloveStix" athletic gear deodorizer (YES) Update on: Sand Cloud (Episode 818)
185	10	"Episode 10"	November 12, 2017	912	4.24
Sharks: Daymond, Richard Branson, Mark, Lori, Robert "Grypmat" non-slip tool tray (YES), "DNA Simple" saliva donor service for science research (YES), "robin" robotic lawnmower service (NO), "SmartGurlz" coding dolls for girls (YES) Update on: Doorbot (Episode 509)
186	11	"Episode 11"	November 12, 2017	907	3.63
Sharks: Robert, Mark, Kevin, Lori, Daymond "Reely Hooked Fish Co." healthy smoked fish dip (YES), "Cut Buddy" multi-curve hair trimming guide tool (YES), "Slumberkins" stuffed animals for sensory stimulation (NO), "ProntoBev" instant wine chiller (YES) Update on: Scrub Daddy (Episode 407)
187	12	"Episode 12"	November 26, 2017	909	4.07
Sharks: Robert, Barbara, Mark, Lori, Rohan Oza "hater" dating app with a twist (YES); "Coco Taps" coconut tapper tool (NO); "EverlyWell" mail-in body liquid samples for lab testing (YES); "Mush" healthy ready-to-eat oatmeal packs (YES); Update on: PupBox (Episode 810)
188	13	"Episode 13"	December 3, 2017	910	3.70
Sharks: Robert, Barbara, Kevin, Lori, Mark "The Original Comfy" cozy way to stay warm during the holidays (YES); "The Christmas Tree Hugger" fabric to make artificial Christmas trees look more realistic (NO); "RokBlok by Pink Donut" wireless record player (YES); "Modern Christmas Trees" Christmas trees made up of centric collapsible rings (YES); Update on: LuminAID (Episode 617)
189	14	"Episode 14"	January 7, 2018	915	4.68
Sharks: Robert, Mark, Kevin, Lori, Daymond "Frywall" cooking pan shield to prevent splatters on stove top (YES); "Elliptical Stroller" baby stroller that doubles as an elliptical trainer (NO); "Inirv" automatic shutoff device for kitchen stoves (NO); "Birddogs" gym shorts with built-in liner (NO); Update on: Plated (meal kits) (Episode 522)
190	15	"Episode 15"	January 7, 2018	916	3.86
Sharks: Robert, Barbara, Mark, Lori, Rohan Oza “iFork” attachable plates, cups, and utensils (YES); “stasher” reusable silicone food storage bags (YES); “recharj” center for power naps (NO); “Detrapel” liquid repellent for fabrics (YES); Update on: Wine & Design (Episode 826)
191	16	"Episode 16"	January 14, 2018	908	5.40
Sharks: Robert, Mark, Kevin, Lori, Daymond "Fish fry" dry batter mix (YES), "G.O.A.T. pet products" bluetooth pet speaker (YES), "Duderobe" stylish modern towel-lined leisurewear for men, hoodie, shorts, pants, robe (NO), "the Longhairs" hair ties for guys, hair serum, head band (YES); Update on: Brightwheel (Episode 724)
192	17	"Episode 17"	January 14, 2018	911	4.65
Sharks: Mark, Sara Blakely, Kevin, Lori, Daymond "Alice's Table" creating women entrepreneurs for flower arranging (YES), "ZUP" easy water sport board for waterskiing "do more", "you go" and "you got this" boards (NO), "boobie bar" herbal lactation bar, oatmeal chocolate chip, peanut butter, blueberry coconut (YES), "Pandaloon" panda puppy costume, rabbit, polar bear, lion, panda gifts and apparel (YES); Update on: Aqua Vault (Episode 621)
193	18	"Episode 18"	January 21, 2018	917	3.94
Sharks: Robert, Mark, Kevin, Lori, Daymond "RounderBum" padded men's undergarments (YES), "Brush Hero" water-pressure powered oscillating brush (NO), "Savy" online service that allows customers to negotiate prices with vendors (NO), "Guzzle Buddy" wine glass attachable to bottles (YES). Update On: Barbara organize a retreat with some of the businesses she invested in, and asked them to swap jobs with each other.
194	19	"Episode 19"	January 21, 2018	913	3.76
Sharks: Mark, Sara Blakely, Kevin, Lori, Daymond "Bouquet Bar" online gift box service (YES), "The Wingman" inflatable life jacket (NO), "Zuvaa" online marketplace for African artisan products (NO), "The Pop" self-protecting pacifier (YES). Update On: The Drop Stop (Episode 420)
195	20	"Episode 20"	January 28, 2018	918	4.52
Sharks: Alex Rodriguez, Barbara, Mark, Lori, Robert "The Dough Bar" protein donuts (YES), "ShowerPill" body wipes (NO), "ChangEd" an app that rounds up transactions to pay for student loan (YES), "SnapClips" silicone weight collars (YES). Update on: The Bouqs Company (Episode 527)
196	21	"Episode 21"	January 28, 2018	919	3.90
Sharks: Robert, Barbara, Mark, Lori, Rohan Oza "Sap!" beverage from tree sap (NO), "Radiate" portable campfire (YES), "Petrol" vitamin water for dogs (NO), "EveryTable" fresh and healthy food restaurant at fast-food prices (YES). Update on: BenjiLock (Episode 901)
197	22	"Episode 22"	February 11, 2018	920	2.87
Sharks: Robert, Barbara, Mark, Lori, Rohan Oza "Gunnar Optiks" computer-safe eyewear (YES); "Avocaderia" avocado-devoted restaurant for toasts, salads, bowls, & smoothies (YES); "Solsource" solar-powered outdoor cooking (YES); "Sunniva Super Coffee" protein-enhanced coffee drink (NO); Update on: Honeyfund (Episode 604)
198	23	"Episode 23"	February 18, 2018	921	3.12
Sharks: Robert, Barbara, Kevin, Lori, Mark "Eggmazing" Easter egg decorator (YES); "Hugo's Amazing Tape" tape with no adhesive (YES); "Coolpeds" electric briefcase scooter (NO); "CoinOut" digital wallet for change on transactions (YES); Update on: Fidgetland (Episode 903)
199	24	"Episode 24"	February 25, 2018	922	3.15
Sharks: Robert, Bethenny Frankel, Mark, Lori, Daymond "Bermies" men's fashionable and comfortable swimwear (NO); "Dermovia Lace Your Face" wearable facial mask (YES); "Palmini" hearts of palm pasta substitute (YES); "Thrive+" capsules that reduce alcohol's negative effects (NO); Update on: Season 9 Recap
