= EmazingLights =

Defunct American retail company

- Company type: Private
- Founded: 2010
- Headquarters: Anaheim, California
- Founder: Brian Lim
- Key people: Brian Lim (Founder & CEO); Scott Elliott (President & COO)
- Industry: Retail
- Net income: ▲
- Employees: 50+
- Website: www.emazinglights.com
- Launched: 2010
- Current status: Defunct

EmazingLights, LLC was a California-based retail company founded in 2010 by company CEO Brian Lim. It is best known for its light show gloves used for modern dance form gloving at rave and electronic dance music festivals. The company was listed as #189 on the Inc. 5000 List for achieving a 2281% growth rate over 3 years of operation and bringing in $5.8 million in revenue in 2013.

Founder Brian Lim appeared as a contestant on ABC's reality competition series Shark Tank on March 13, 2015. Lim accepted a deal from sharks Mark Cuban and Daymond John for $650,000 for 5% equity in the company and 20% of the revenue made from licensing deals.

In January 2023, EmazingLights closed down citing devastating company losses due to the gloving ban at major festivals and global pandemic.
