= Besomebody =

US business innovation firm

Besomebody, Inc.
- Type: Private
- Industry: Business Services, Education
- Founded: 2014; 12 years ago in Austin, Texas
- Founder: Kash Shaikh
- Headquarters: 917 Main St. #200, Cincinnati, Ohio, United States
- Area served: Worldwide
- Key people: Kash Shaikh (CEO); Rick Shaikh (CDO)
- Services: Experiential learning, Business Services, Employer Branding, Company Culture
- Website: besomebody.com

Besomebody, Inc. was an American online marketplace for recruiting and vocational training. The company was founded in 2014 in Austin, Texas by Kash Shaikh, a former Procter & Gamble and GoPro employee who had previously used the name for his blog. Besomebody began as Shaikh’s personal blog in 2011.

== History ==
Besomebody, Inc. was founded in 2014 in Austin, Texas.

Besomebody originally acted as an intermediary for users to book sessions with trainers, instructors, or motivational speakers. The company described this as a form of experiential learning.

In 2014, Besomebody raised $1 Million from media company E. W. Scripps Company, and in 2015, it raised an additional $1 million from angel investors. On May 18, 2016, the company announced its relocation to Boston, Massachusetts. On November 4, 2016, Shaikh pitched Besomebody on Episode 7 of Season 8 of ABC's Shark Tank. He was unsuccessful in securing an investment, as the panelists either felt Besomebody's business model or central premise was flawed, or took issue with Shaikh's pitch.

In February 2017, Besomebody sold its experience marketplace app to Utivity Holdings, Inc., a Denver-based company which offers similar services.

In March 2017, the company relocated to Cincinnati, Ohio and launched its "Nutrition Technician Path" pilot with Kroger. The company now describes itself as a job placement and employer services firm.

In November 2018, Besomebody acquired Opening Minds, LLC, a Cincinnati-based multimedia and event firm. The acquisition broadened Besomebody's capabilities in creative, digital, and event management services.

In January 2019, Besomebody acquired Pixelbug Technologies, Inc., a technology firm based in Montreal, Canada, which offers artificial intelligence and augmented reality services.

== See also ==
- Uberisation
