= Cycloramic =

Phone app to take panaoramic photos

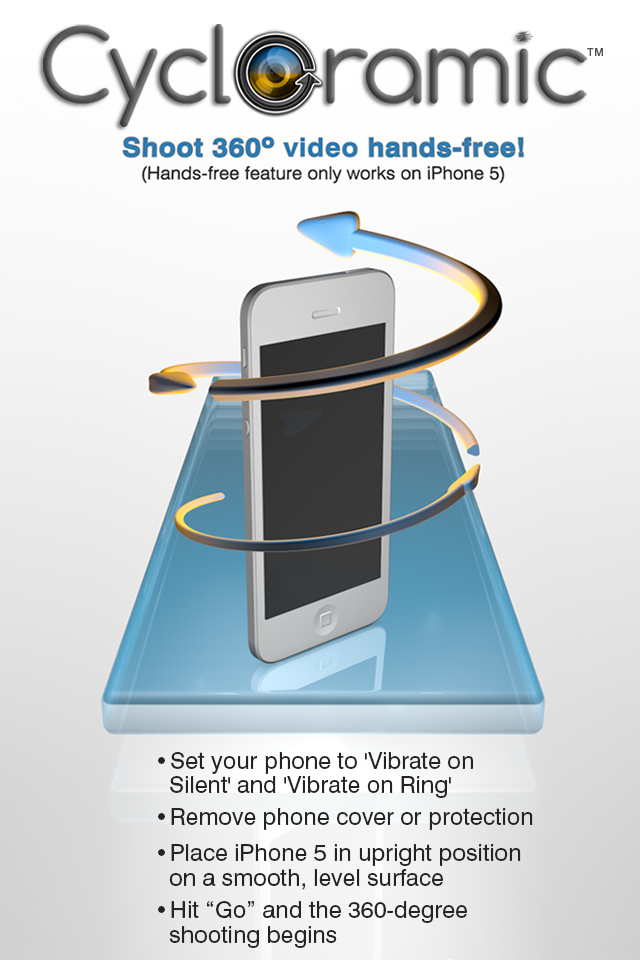
- Image explaining how Cycloramic iPhone app works
- Developer: Egos Ventures Inc.
- Release: 20 December 2012
- Stable release: 3.0 / 21 June 2013
- Written in: Objective C / C++
- Operating system: iOS 6.0 or later / Windows Phone 8.0 or later
- Available in: English
- Website: cycloramic.com

Cycloramic is an iOS and Windows Phone application that makes the Apple iPhone and Compatible Windows Phones rotate 360 degrees without user intervention. It switches the phone's vibrator at a specific (undisclosed) frequency to make the phone spin around its vertical axis and track the rotation angle using the gyroscope, compass and accelerometer while taking panoramic images. This "handsfree" feature works only on the iPhone 5 and iPhone 5s standing on one of its flat edges. Because of this limitation, iPhone 4 users take panoramic photos in a guided mode. Another feature of this program is the ability to post process panoramic images into 24-second videos for other uses. The update introduced on June 22, 2013 added features to store, edit and share the panoramic pictures.

== Background ==
Cycloramic was created in December 2012 by a start-up called "Egos Ventures" which is part of the Advanced Technology Development Center located in Tech Square, Atlanta, Georgia.

== Reception ==
Cycloramic received a "Pogie Award" for the Brightest Ideas of 2012 from David Pogue, a personal technology columnist for The New York Times . The app also triggered the interest of other influential tech journalists witnessing the iPhone "dance". Steve Wozniak filmed himself using the app judging it "unexpected, fanciful and useful at the same time". The application was downloaded 100,000 times in 7 days when it launched in December 2012. Egos Ventures has since been selected as one of the Top 10 Innovative Companies in Georgia and presented Cycloramic at the 2013 Georgia Technology Summit (GTS) on March 20, 2013.

== Features ==
The initial (1.0) version of Cycloramic generated panoramic videos, rather than pictures. The 2.0 version later introduced a photo mode allowing users to take panoramic photos in addition to videos. Users can choose to convert their panoramic photos into 24-second movies since the 2.1 version. The version 3.0 update added an in-app photo library with editing features. The editing allowed for modification to the original 14 images that created the panorama individually. This version also allowed images (panorama or individual) to be shared via social media. Usage requires a mount bought separately.

== Criticism ==
The 2.0 version added in-app purchases, and the update disabled a feature that was present in the original version that users had paid for.

== Shark Tank ==
Cycloramic appeared on the January 31, 2014 Season 5, episode 16 of Shark Tank. The product yielded one of the largest deals in the history of Shark Tank ($500k for 15% from Mark Cuban and Lori Greiner).

== Post Shark Tank ==
The app got 8 million downloads after the deal. The company was later sold to Carvana for $22 million.
