= Iretron =

Electronic recycling company

iReTron is a recommerce and recycling service company in Los Gatos, California. It allows consumers to sell their old electronics, including cellphones, iPhones, iPods, mp3 players, tablets, iPads, e-readers, calculators and other devices, for free.

== Business model ==
The website has users submit the model and condition of their used devices then get a cash offer that the user can either accept or decline. iReTron also repairs and resells used electronics, and offers free shipping.

== In media ==
In 2014, iReTron appeared on the 6th season of the TV show Shark Tank. iReTron was founded in November 2011 by Jason Li, who was then a high school student in Los Gatos, California. The idea originated after Li repaired his own broken iPod Touch and recognized an opportunity to refurbish and resell used electronics. He launched the company with a $2,000 loan from his father and expanded operations by building a website and promoting the service locally.

Li secured a $100,000 investment from sharks Mark Cuban and Barbara Corcoran in exchange for 20% of the company. After the show, it was revealed that the deal was never finalized between Li and the sharks. iReTron has subsequently shut down.

== See also ==
- Electronic waste in the United States
