= Velocity Signs =

- Company type: Private
- Founded: 2006; 19 years ago
- Founder: Scott Adams and Josh Faherty
- Headquarters: Sacramento, California
- Website: www.velocitysigns.com

Velocity Signs is a sign-waving machine manufacturer based in Sacramento, California. The company produces portable and rechargeable sign-waving machines. Scott Adams is Velocity Signs' President and CEO. The company appeared on Shark Tank in April 2014.

== History ==
In 2006, Scott Adams and Josh Faherty, an engineer, developed the idea for a sign-waving machine. They began manufacturing devices in 2009. The machines are made in the United States. During Velocity Signs' first year, it generated $257,000 in sales. The company appeared on Shark Tank in April 2014. Velocity Signs was selected from a pool of 30,000 applicants to appear on the television show. Mark Cuban, Robert Herjavec and Kevin O'Leary invested $225,000 for a 30% interest in the company. Lori Greiner and Barbara Corcoran also offered funding. Velocity Signs' clients include Subway, Burger King and Chevrolet and Ford automobile dealerships.
