= PiperWai =

American deodorant brand

PiperWai Natural Deodorant
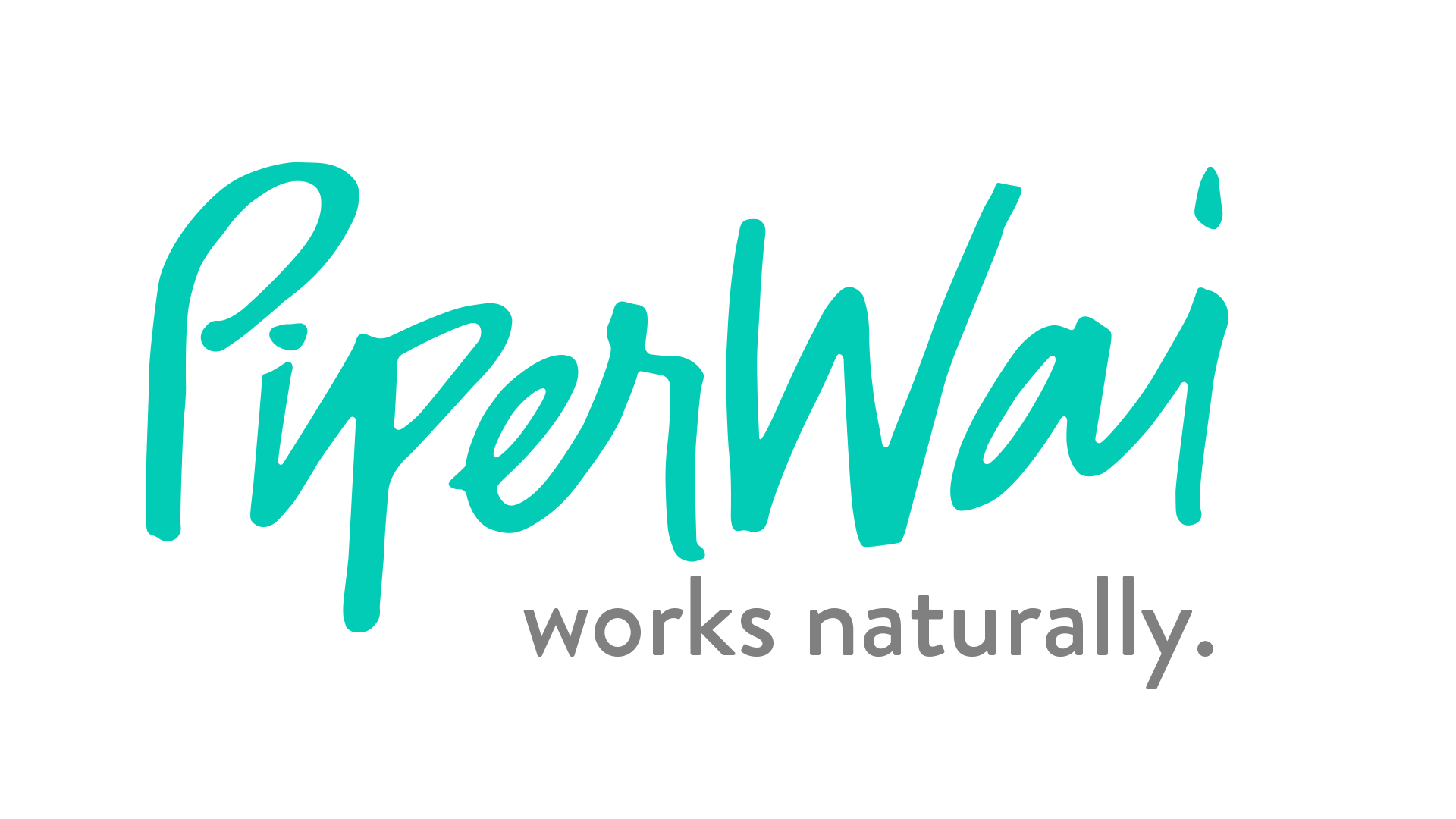
- Product type: Deodorant
- Current owner: PiperWai
- Country: United States
- Introduced: 2014
- Markets: Worldwide
- Ambassadors: Sarah Ribner; Jess Edelstein
- Tagline: Works naturally.
- Website: www.piperwai.com

PiperWai is an American deodorant brand. It was featured on Shark Tank in December 2015 and received an offer from Barbara Corcoran. The product experienced the "Shark Tank effect" and sold out within five minutes of airing, with more than $1 million in sales over the next month. The company's founders, Sarah Ribner and Jess Edelstein, did not accept Corcoran's offer after a year of negotiations and became self-funded.

== Background ==
The name "PiperWai" comes from a combination of Edelstein's family dog's name, Piper, and a Guyana tribe called the Wai Wai. The brand is best known for developing all-natural deodorant made from charcoal, which was created in a Philadelphia, Pennsylvania kitchen. Edelstein gave the product to Ribner to test during a trip to South America in November 2013.

Afterward, Edelstein and Ribner received a $2,000 loan from their parents to produce the raw materials and develop a website. PiperWai was co-founded by Ribner and Edelstein in March 2014. In spring 2015, they raised $27,000 through a crowdfunding campaign for a branding redesign. PiperWai has retail distribution in more than 200 independent lifestyle boutiques and has 200,000 customers. PiperWai has received press from many media outlets and regularly frequents as a top choice of HSN with on air personality Noel Elie as their spokesmodel and wellness expert.

== Ingredients ==
The formula uses activated charcoal powder, which is advertised as rubbing clear and not discolouring clothing. According to Edelstein, it can absorb hundreds of times its own weight in moisture. It is applied in a pea-sized amount from a jar straight onto the armpit. Other ingredients include cocoa butter, Shea butter, vitamin E, magnesium hydroxide, baking soda, and a proprietary blend of 11 essential oils.
