= Shark Wheel =

Wheel manufacturing company based in California, United States

- Company type: Private
- Industry: Consumer durables
- Founded: 2012; 13 years ago in Lake Forest, California, United States
- Founders: David Patrick, Zack Fleishman
- Headquarters: Mission Viejo, California, United States
- Products: Skateboard wheels
- Website: sharkwheel.com

Shark Wheel is a company based in Lake Forest, California that manufactures helical wheels of the same name. Rather than a traditional circular shape, the Shark Wheel is composed of one or many three-dimensional sine waves. The shape is a hybrid of a sphere and cube, taking on the properties of both shapes while in motion. It has been touted as the reinvention of the wheel by various news outlets. The wheels were funded by a Kickstarter campaign that reached nearly eight times its initial goal. It attracted the attention of award-winning skateboarder Tony Hawk and was used by skateboarders who placed in various competitions around the world. The product appeared on ABC's Shark Tank in May 2015.

== Inventor ==
The shape of Shark Wheels came to David Patrick while he was designing an alternating wake turbine that was a spinoff from his research. The sine wave design that Patrick's research came up with worked well for the turbine (which Patrick says also has potential uses in wind, water, and other forms of renewable energy generation). Patrick's work has led to support from the LA Cleantech Incubator and the formation of 4sphere, a renewable energy company.

The shape of the Shark Wheel was intended for use as the four component pieces of the turbine (and its shape is in current use). When the Shark Wheel shape was accidentally dropped, it rolled. The wheels appear to be square, but roll smoothly like conventional wheels. Its single or multiple interlocking rings are based on sine wave patterns, which create a thinner contact patch with the pavement compared to a conventional wheel of the same width. The company claims that this design offers less rolling resistance and a faster ride. The company also claims the design has properties of thin and wide wheels, depending on the terrain (on hard surfaces it operates like a thin wheel with low friction and on soft terrain it produces the contact patch of a wide wheel). The shape of the wheel resembles a shark's jaw which Patrick says gave the product and the company their names.

== Application ==
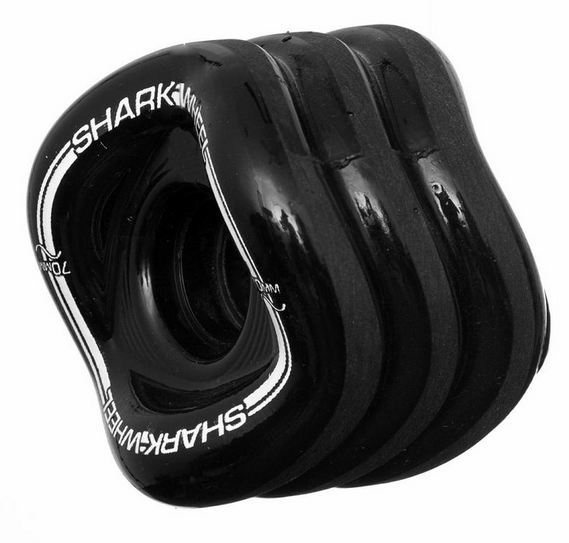
Shark Wheel for skateboard applications.

Shark Wheel says its skateboard wheel design gives it better maneuverability over debris, water and other conditions that deteriorate the performance of conventional wheels. According to a Future Tech segment in the Discovery Channel's Daily Planet series, the thinner contact patch from the three strips gave a faster ride, less rolling resistance while cutting a path through dirt, sand and water which also reduces hydroplaning (as opposed to traditional skateboard wheels which "steamroll" over obstacles) Skateboarder Tony Hawk said he saw how the wheels could be very functional, especially downhill.

Patrick funded Shark Wheels’ initial design and manufacturing though a Kickstarter campaign in the summer of 2013. Though the initial goal was $10,000, it closed with close to $80,000 pledges from 1,094 backers, delivering over 1,000 sets of wheels. There was also preorder available on Shark Wheel website up to April 2014.

Skateboarder Eric Palmer, using Shark Wheels, placed No. 4 in the Miami Ultraskate 2014, and No. 3 in the Broad Street Bomb in Philadelphia; Casper Grette of the uGGa buGGa crew also placed No. 1 in the Kongsberg Downhill in Norway 2014 using the wheels.

The wheels have applications where an upright wheel would usually be used. Future potential applications the company mentioned include luggage wheels, roller skates and scooters, as well as many other transportation-related and industrial applications.
