= Rent A Goat =

American company renting out goat herds for land clearing

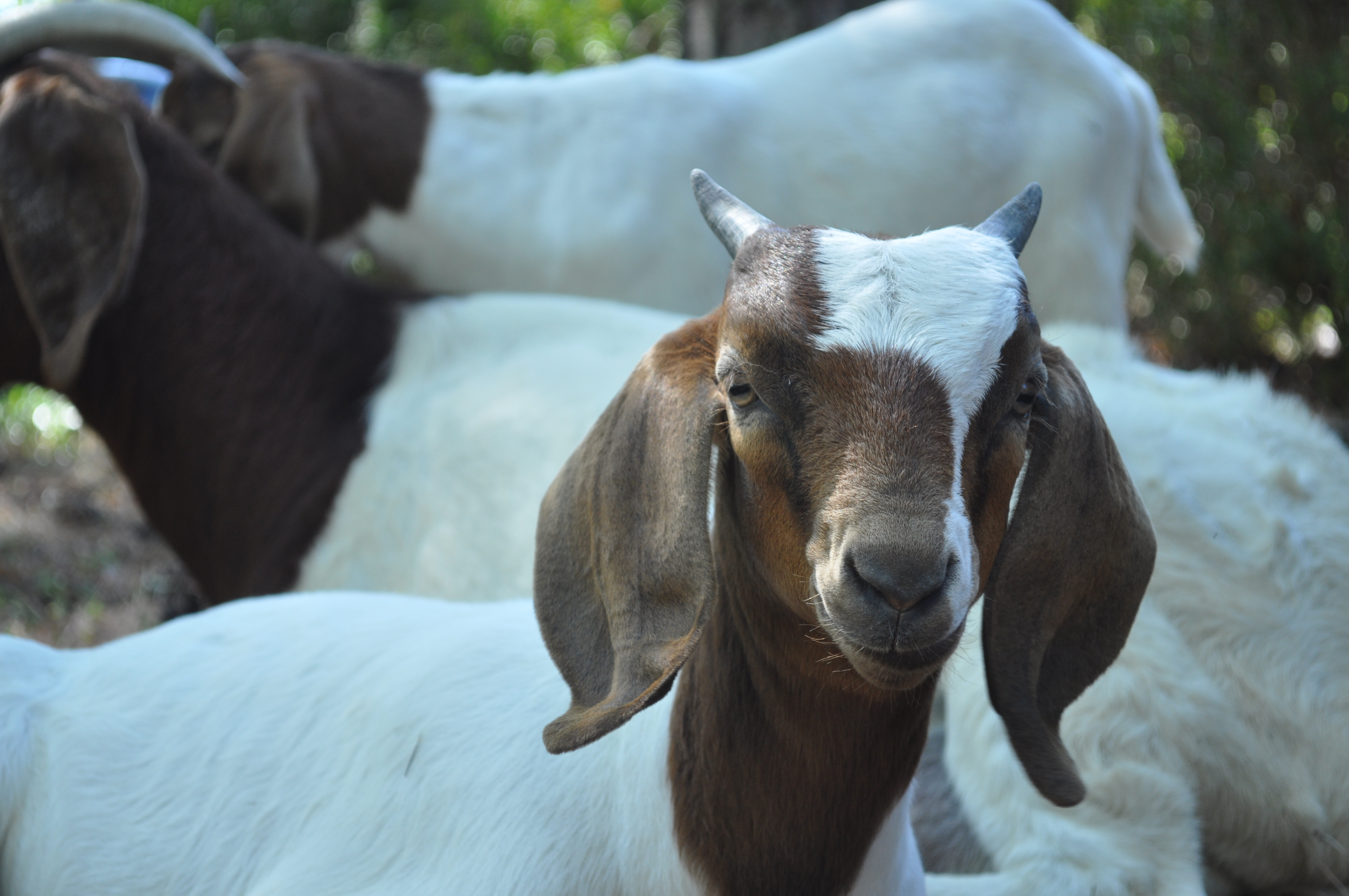
Boer Goat

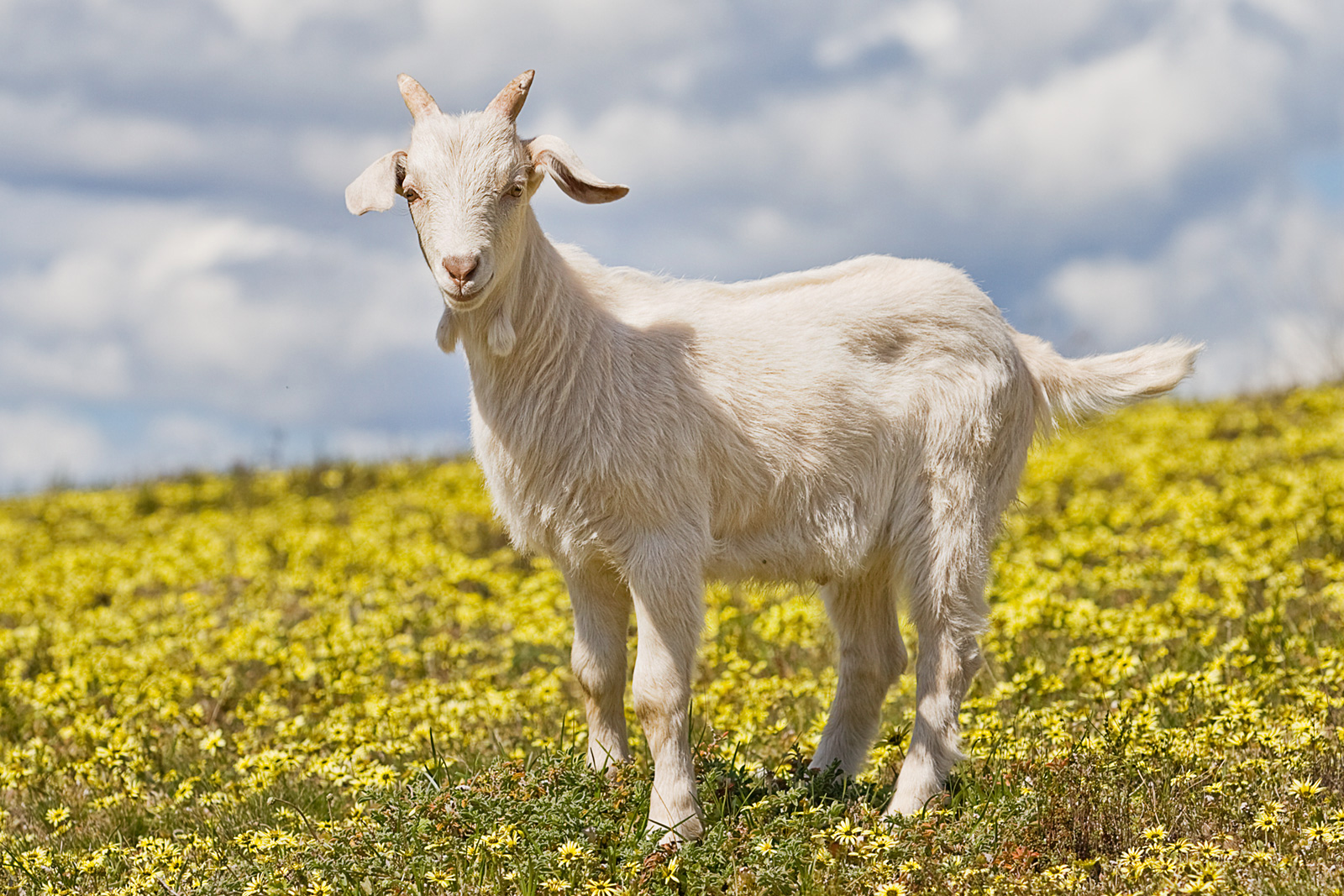
Domestic goat kid in capeweed

Rent A Goat is an American company that rents out goat herds for land clearing. It and other goat rental companies are part of a larger phenomenon called conservation grazing or targeted grazing, whereby herds of grazing and browsing livestock are used instead of traditional machinery or pesticides to curb unwanted plant growth. This includes plants such as invasive species, brush in wildfire-prone regions, and overgrowth in residential landscaping.

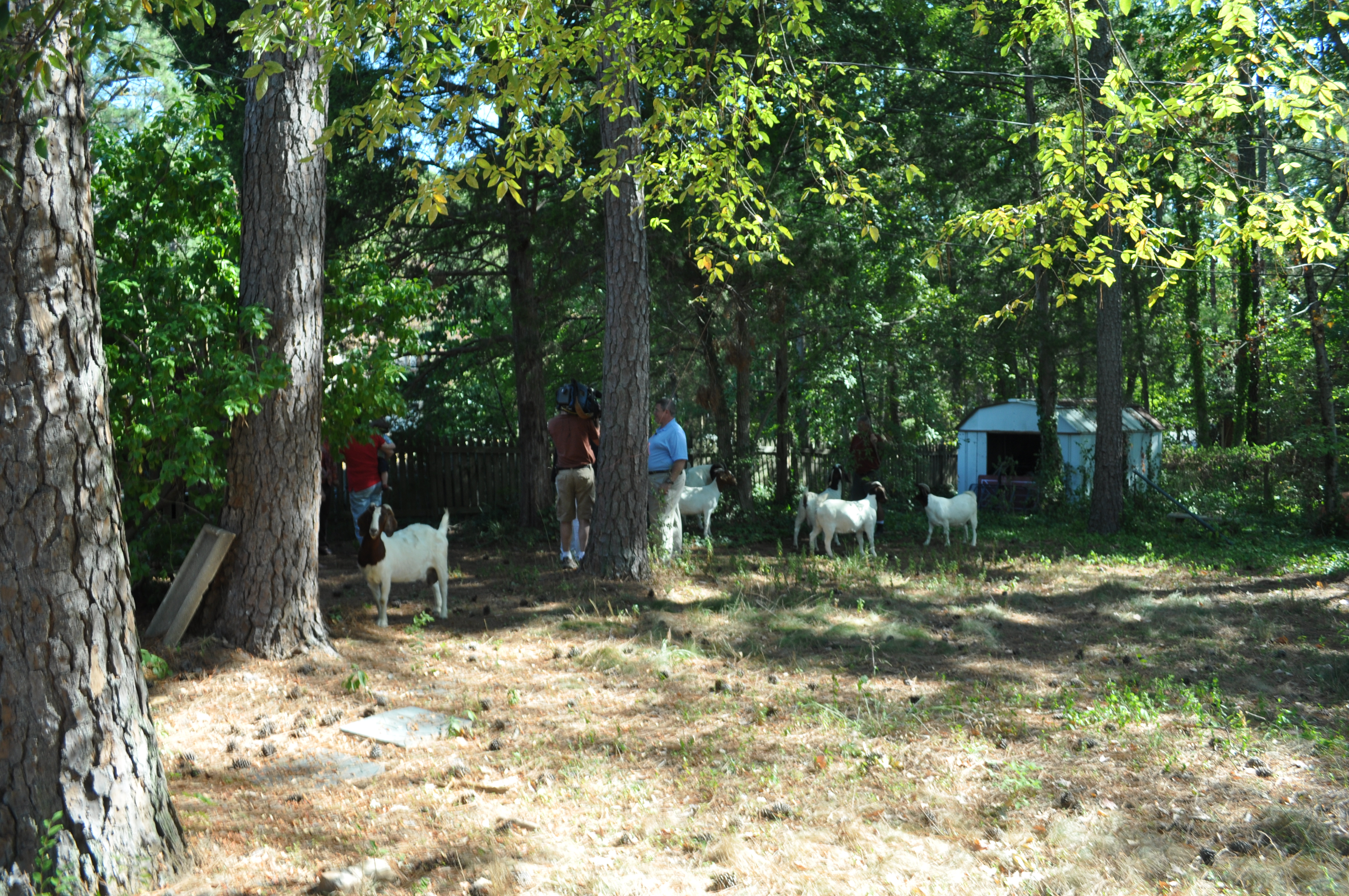
Goats being used to clear English ivy from a residential backyard

== History ==
Rent A Goat was founded in 2010 by 22-year-old entrepreneur Matthew Richmond from Chapel Hill, North Carolina and his partner Mike Canaday. Since that time, goat rental has become a more publicly acceptable form of weed abatement according to The Street: "Whether you have just enough front or back yard to get overgrown and unwieldy or find yourself overrun with nasty, prickly, invasive plants that just won't go away, nature has already devised the ultimate solution to your problem."

Goat rental companies existed before Rent A Goat, however. In 2009, Google rented goats from a company called California Grazing in Mountain View, California to clear overgrown lawns. Also in 2009, the Maryland State Highway Administration enlisted a herd of 40 goats to graze in a construction zone in the vicinity of boggy wetlands, since mechanical lawnmowers posed a danger to the wetlands as well as a local threatened species, the bog turtle.

Agencies that have used goats to manage plants on their properties include the U.S. Fish and Wildlife Service, the Bureau of Reclamation, the Bureau of Land Management, the United States Forest Service, and the city of Seattle. California has reportedly used goats to reduce the occurrence of wildfire. In 2013, a (non-ranked) mention was made of Rent A Goat in Entrepreneur Magazine's "Top 100 Brilliant Companies".

== Usage ==
Nationally, various rent-a-goat companies have cropped up over the last ten years and are used in a wide variety of settings, including: homeowners, large and small properties, companies and commercial entities, universities, municipalities, such as roads and parks, government agencies, including military facilities. As ruminants, goats have a four-chambered stomach which allows them to digest a wide variety of vegetation. Their size and nimbleness makes them the perfect small plant removal system.

Goats are known to eat a wide variety of invasive or problematic plants. Some notable examples include:

- Thistle
- Blackberries
- Poison oak and poison ivy
- Kudzu
- Trumpet vine
- Sagebrush
- Sapling trees

== Constraints ==
Businesses akin to Rent A Goat have not yet proven their viability in the landscaping market. Cited difficulties include fencing, water, and the need to provide a place for the animals when not being used for vegetation management. Both research and extension activities are needed to develop and transfer the technology for improving the effectiveness and profitability of goats for vegetation management. While goats are relatively inexpensive and require only what they eat as fuel, companies may only provide as many as 30 at a time on their own or through farm subcontractors. Goats can be effectively used to manage most types of vegetation, but greater knowledge is required before the full potential of using goats for vegetation management can be realized.

== Benefits ==
One perceived benefit of using goats to clear invasive weeds is their ability to handle rocky and steep terrain that humans or machines can't normally clear easily. In some situations, their cost is also less, when compared to heavy machinery. Goats are reportedly "an environmentally friendly method for clearing areas containing invasive vegetation... thinning by goats is a natural method resulting in a naturally balanced environment over the long term."

A North Carolina study compared the effectiveness of goats versus chemicals in clearing kudzu from an infested area, and found the goats to be drastically more effective than were the chemicals. Goats can also reduce the threat of forest fires by cleaning up combustible materials without the need for any chemicals or gas-powered machinery.

== Media Attention ==
The concept has gained much renown since 2010. Goat rental companies have appeared on The Today Show, Regis and Kelly, The Colbert Report, and in AOL News, TreeHugger, The Wall Street Journal, The Associated Press, and the book Mrs. Lizzy is Dizzy!
