= Bombas =

American apparel brand

- Industry: Clothing
- Founded: 2013; 13 years ago
- Founders: Randy Goldberg; David Heath
- Headquarters: New York City, United States
- Website: bombas.com

Bombas is an American apparel brand. The company is known mainly for their socks, but has since expanded into other clothing categories. The majority of its sales are made direct-to-consumer, augmented by a small percentage from wholesale partners. For every item purchased, a clothing item is donated to a homeless shelter or homelessness-related charity.

== History ==
Bombas launched in 2013, after founders Randy Goldberg and David Heath learned that socks are the most requested clothing item in homeless shelters. They established the brand's mission to donate one pair of socks for every pair purchased.

The company first received funding in 2013, raising nearly $145,000 through the crowdfunding website Indiegogo. A year later, the company raised $1 million in seed funding from friends and family. The founders appeared on a September 2014 episode of ABC's Shark Tank and secured a deal with Daymond John. In 2018, the company exceeded $100 million in revenue.

In 2019, Bombas added T-shirts to their range. It later expanded into other clothing and the underwear and footwear categories. By April 2020, Bombas had donated 35 million pairs of socks.

In June 2020, Bombas released a collection of socks for which the company would donate an apparel item to a charity supporting LGBTQ youth for each item purchased. As of October 2023, the company has done $1.3 billion in retail sales.

In 2024, Bombas participated as one of the brand partners in the merchandising campaign for the first film of the two-part film adaptation of the musical Wicked for Universal Pictures. As of 2025, the company has given more than 150 million products to people experiencing homelessness across the U.S.

In 2025, the company began opening physical stores. The first Bombas store opened in October 2025 in New York City.

== See also ==
- List of sock manufacturers
