= Shark Tank season 3 =

Shark Tank
- Season 3
- No. of episodes: 15

Release
- Original network: ABC
- Original release: January 20 – May 18, 2012

Season chronology
- ← Previous; Season 2 Next → Season 4

This is a list of episodes from the third season of Shark Tank.

== Episodes ==
Mark Cuban, Daymond John, Kevin O'Leary and Robert Herjavec appear as sharks in every episode this season. Barbara Corcoran is still credited as a main shark, but her slot is filled in by guest shark Lori Greiner in several episodes.

No. overall	No. in season	Title	Original release date	Prod. code	U.S. viewers (millions)
24	1	"Episode 301"	January 20, 2012	301	6.25
"The Clean Bottle" easy to clean water bottles (YES); "My Wonderful Life" a funeral planning service (NO); "Business Ghost" a ghost writing service (NO); "EZ VIP" a club reservation service (YES); Update on: Origaudio (Episode 207); Note: NBA star Bill Walton makes a cameo to pitch for Clean Bottle.
25	2	"Episode 302"	January 27, 2012	302	5.44
"I Want To Draw A Cat For You" an online service that creates and delivers custom cat drawings (YES); "Salespreneur" a company that teaches how to become a good sales rep (NO); "Vegas Magic Show" a magic show act (NO); "Invis-A-Rack" a collapsable cargo rack for truck beds (NO); Update on: CitiKitty (Episode 209)
26	3	"Episode 303"	February 3, 2012	303	5.16
"Chord Buddy" a system for learning to play guitar (YES); "Liquid Money" a fragrance that smells like money (NO); "Tail Lightz" a blinking accessory for jeans (NO); "You Smell Soap" luxury soap (YES); Update on: CBS Foods (Episode 201)
27	4	"Episode 304"	February 10, 2012	304	5.89
Guest shark: Lori Greiner "The Swilt" a sweater and quilt combination (NO); "Show No" a towel that provides coverage to change out of a swimsuit in public (YES); "Puppy Cake" a cake mix for dogs (NO); "Wine Balloon" (later known as Air Cork) a way to keep wine good for longer (YES); Update on: Notehall (Episode 108); Note: In a Shark Tank first, the creator of Show No was given a check immediately after agreeing to the deal, bypassing the usual due diligence process.
28	5	"Episode 305"	February 17, 2012	305	5.69
Guest shark: Lori Greiner "The Last Lid" a universal garbage can lid (YES); "Ledge Pillow" a pillow for woman with large breasts (NO); "Talbott Teas" premium teas (YES); "M3 Girl Designs" a jewelry line for kids (YES); Update on: Lightfilm (Episode 205)
29	6	"Episode 306"	February 24, 2012	306	5.86
Guest shark: Lori Greiner "Five Minute Furniture" an easy-assembly furniture line (NO); "The Painted Pretzel" a candy pretzel business (YES); "Esso Watches" a wristwatch with alleged health benefits (NO); "Readerest Specsecure" a magnet that allows you to attach your glasses to your shirt so you won't lose them (YES); Update on: Man Candle (Episode 208)
30	7	"Episode 307"	March 2, 2012	307	5.69
"Kisstixx" flavored mix-and-match lip balms (YES); "The Smart Baker" a line of home baking products (YES); "The Heat Helper" a laundry dryer heat-recycling device (NO); "Technology Enabled Clothing" clothing designed for portable electronics (NO); Update on: Daisy Cakes (Episode 207); Note: Apple co-founder Steve Wozniak is contacted over phone during the Technology Enabled Clothing pitch.
31	8	"Episode 308"	March 9, 2012	308	5.11
"The Original Profender" a basketball training device (NO); "Nardo's Natural" a line of skin care products (YES); "Rent-A-Grandma" a babysitting service staffed by older women (NO); "Litter" a line of body jewelry (YES); Update on: Pork Barrel BBQ (Episode 106)
32	9	"Episode 309"	March 16, 2012	309	5.97
"Tower Paddle Boards" a paddle board company (YES); "Instant Lifts" clear adhesives that improve the look of sagging skin (NO); "Vinamor" a wine aerator (NO); "MisoMedia" software for learning to play instruments (YES); Update on: Readerest (Episode 306); Note: Singer Ingrid Michaelson makes a cameo to demonstrate MisoMedia.
33	10	"Episode 310"	March 23, 2012	310	5.78
"The Ave Venice" customized shoe designs (NO); "Bark’em’s To Go" pet food packaged to-go (NO); "Brewer’s Cow" beer flavored ice cream (NO); "GoGo Gear" fashionable motorcycle and scooter protective riding apparel (YES); Update on: Ride-On Carry-On (Episode 204)
34	11	"Episode 311"	April 13, 2012	311	5.49
"Blondies Cookies" a cookie business (NO); "ViewSport" T-Shirts with designs that appear when in contact with water (NO); "The Sullivan Generator" a machine that produces natural energy from Earth's rotation and gold as a by-product (NO); "Copa di Vino" the wine in a glass creator returns to pitch his product again (NO); Update on: Copa di Vino (Episode 201); Note: This episode is the first to show a past entrepreneur return to the tank (Copa di Vino, Episode 201).
35	12	"Episode 312"	April 27, 2012	312	5.42
Guest shark: Lori Greiner "Nail Pak" a 3-in-1 nail polish, remover, and file (YES); "Debbie Brooks Handbags" customizable handbags (NO); "Trimi Tank" tank tops with interchangeable straps (NO); "Lollacup" spill proof sippy cups (YES); Update on: Talbott Teas (Episode 305)
36	13	"Episode 313"	May 4, 2012	313	6.06
"AirBedz" air mattresses for truck beds (NO); "Skyride" a human-powered monorail system (NO); "Boot Illusions" interchangeable covers to make heels into boots (YES); "Villy Customs" customizable bicycles (YES); Update on: Show No (Episode 304)
37	14	"Episode 314"	May 11, 2012	314	5.59
"Wild Squirrel Nut Butter" a line of peanut butters (YES); "CAB20" a garage rock band managed by Tom Callahan, who discovered this quartet consisted of members singer/guitarist Bert Hoover, bassist Jason Silengo-Almanza, guitarist Erik Lake, and drummer Zack Cosby. (NO); "Mix Bikini" mix and match bikinis (YES); "Billy Blanks Jr.'s Dance With Me" a new fitness program created by the son of the creator of the best selling fitness DVD ever (YES); Update on: I Want To Draw A Cat For You (Episode 302); Note: In a Shark Tank first, the creator of Dance With Me was followed out of the tank after declining a deal and offered a chance to reconsider, which he did.
38	15	"Episode 315"	May 18, 2012	315	5.52
"Cougar Limited" an energy drink for women (NO); "Remyxx ReKixx Sneakers" fashionable shoes that are completely recyclable (YES); "The NitroForce Titan 1000" a home gym system (NO); "UniKey Technologies" door locks operated by a smart phone application (YES); Update on: EZ VIP (Episode 301)
