= The Alaska Challenge =

Wheelchair and handcycle race

The Alaska Challenge is a wheelchair and handcycle race organized by Challenge Alaska that runs between Fairbanks and Anchorage, Alaska. It is the world's longest wheelchair race.

The race was originally known as the Midnight Sun Ultra Challenge and started in 1984 when founder Don Brandon and his friend Tom Carnhan raced wheelchairs from Fairbanks to Anchorage. Brandon had wanted to honor his two brothers who had intellectual disabilities and show what people with disabilities could accomplish. The race was later named Sadler's Ultra Challenge and then Sadler's Alaska Challenge after one of its sponsors, Sadler's Home Furnishings from 1996–2014.

Divisions include Men's Handcycle (with A, B, and C classes), Men's Wheelchair, and Women's Handcycle. The 267-mile-long (430 km) race is run in eight stages and takes six days to complete. The annual competition occurs in July of each year.

There was a virtual race in 2020.
