= Shark Tank season 4 =

Shark Tank
- Season 4
- No. of episodes: 26

Release
- Original network: ABC
- Original release: September 14, 2012 – May 17, 2013

Season chronology
- ← Previous; Season 3 Next → Season 5

This is a list of episodes from the fourth season of Shark Tank.

== Episodes ==
Mark Cuban, Daymond John, Kevin O'Leary and Robert Herjavec appear as sharks in every episode this season. Barbara Corcoran and Lori Greiner are credited as main sharks but alternate as the fifth shark.

No. overall	No. in season	Title	Original release date	Prod. code	U.S. viewers (millions)
39	1	"Episode 401"	September 14, 2012	401	6.40
Sharks: Mark, Daymond, Kevin, Barbara, Robert "CoatChex" a ticketless coat checking system (NO); "Bev Buckle" a belt buckle which serves as a beverage holder (YES); "Body Walking" a massage service where the masseuse stands on the client (NO); "Buggy Beds" bed bug glue traps (YES); Update on: Readerest (Episode 306)
40	2	"Episode 402"	September 21, 2012	402	5.97
Sharks: Mark, Daymond, Kevin, Barbara, Robert "SurfSet Fitness" surfing-inspired exercise equipment (YES); "Alpha M" a how-to-dress-for-success DVD series for men (NO); "eCreamery" mail-order personalized ice cream (NO); "CATEapp" a smartphone app that hides messages from certain contacts (YES); Update on: Element Bars (Episode 106); Note: Pro surfer Lakey Peterson makes a cameo to demonstrate SurfSet Fitness; The creator of Alpha M would return to the tank in the future (Episode 729) to pitch a new business.
41	3	"Episode 403"	September 28, 2012	403	6.05
Sharks: Mark, Daymond, Kevin, Barbara, Robert "Liz Lovely Cookies" gluten free, vegan cookies (NO); "Rock Bands" bracelets made with allegedly healing stones (YES); "FuzziBunz" reusable baby diapers (NO); "Posture Now" a posture correcting device (YES); Update on: Tower Paddle Boards (Episode 309); Note: Entertainment reporter Robin Leach makes a cameo to pitch for Rock Bands; Dancing with the Stars pros Jonathan Roberts and Anna Trebunskaya make cameos to pitch for Posture Now.
42	4	"Episode 404"	October 5, 2012	404	6.15; 6.869
Sharks: Mark, Daymond, Kevin, Lori, Robert "Back 9 Dips" a chicken flavored dip (YES); "Lifter Hamper" a clothes hamper that raises as you empty it to ease bending over (NO); "Bag Bowl" a sleeve that converts zip-lock bags into temporary bowls (YES); "Zomm" a device that alerts you if you forget your keys or phone (NO); Update on: Villy Customs (Episode 313)
43	5	"Episode 405"	October 12, 2012	405	6.48
Sharks: Mark, Daymond, Kevin, Lori, Robert "Cozy Bug" a line of pillowcase dresses for girls (YES); "Wired Waffles" energy-boosting waffles (NO); "Spatty" a miniature spatula designed to scrape small containers completely clean (NO, but Daymond promised to provide industry contacts); "Marz Sprays" vitamin oral sprays (YES); Update on: Games2U (Episode 207)
44	6	"Episode 406"	October 19, 2012	406	7.08
Sharks: Mark, Daymond, Kevin, Barbara, Robert "Cousins Maine Lobster" a food truck serving lobster from Maine (YES); "Freaker USA" beer koozies (NO); "PRO-NRG" energy-infused flavored water (YES); "Eco Nuts" natural soap nuts for laundry (NO); Update on: Kisstixx (Episode 307); Note: NFL star Brandon Jacobs makes a cameo to pitch for PRO-NRG.
45	7	"Episode 407"	October 26, 2012	407	6.84
Sharks: Mark, Daymond, Kevin, Lori, Robert "Scrub Daddy" an innovative dish scrubbing tool (YES); "The Bear & The Rat" dog-friendly frozen yogurt (NO); "SBU" an electric self-balancing unicycle (YES); "Shemie" modernized slips (NO); Update on: Lollacup (Episode 312)
46	8	"Episode 408"	November 2, 2012	408	7.44
Sharks: Mark, Daymond, Kevin, Lori, Robert "Cool Wazoo" a 5-in-1 baby mat cover (YES); "No Fly Cone" a fly trap that uses dog excrement as bait (NO); "PlateTopper" airtight plate covers (YES); Update on: NailPak (Episode 312); Note: Actor Seth MacFarlane makes a cameo to pitch for No Fly Cone.
47	9	"Episode 409"	November 9, 2012	409	6.69
Sharks: Mark, Daymond, Kevin, Barbara, Robert "Drive Suits" motorized vehicle suits (YES); "PC Classes Online" a computer instruction service for baby boomers (NO); "ReVestor" a real estate search engine (NO); "Ice Chips" a healthy xylitol hard candy (YES); Update on: Voyage Air Guitar (Episode 103); Note: Actor Bruce Vilanch makes a cameo to pitch for PC Classes Online.
48	10	"Episode 410"	November 16, 2012	410	6.82
Sharks: Mark, Daymond, Kevin, Barbara, Robert "Nearly Newlywed" a bridal dress boutique which buys, sells, and rents online (NO); "Corks Away" a wine cruise business (NO); "Tie Try" a neck tie mail-order rental service (NO); "Ruckpack" a caffeine free energy drink developed by U.S. special forces (YES); Update on: Aldo Orta Jewelry (Episode 209)
49	11	"Episode 411"	December 4, 2012	411	6.89
Sharks: Mark, Daymond, Kevin, Barbara, Robert "The Coop" a children's party place (YES); "Fat Ass Fudge" a homemade fudge company (NO); "The Living Christmas Company" a Christmas tree renting service (YES); "Partie Poche" a fashion accessory for women that replaces a handbag by carrying her phone and essentials around her leg (NO); Update on: Chord Buddy (Episode 303); Note: Country musician John Rich cameos during the Chord Buddy update.
50	12	"Episode 412"	January 4, 2013	412	6.42
Sharks: Mark, Daymond, Kevin, Lori, Robert "The GameFace Company" peel-off face masks (YES); "ARKEG" an arcade game machine that doubles as a beer tap (NO); "Dura-Tent" screen tent-like food covers (NO); "Hot Tot" professional hair products for children (YES); Update on: Wild Squirrel Nut Butter (Episode 314)
51	13	"Episode 413"	January 11, 2013	413	6.87
Sharks: Mark, Daymond, Kevin, Lori, Robert "Coffee Joulies" a capsule that absorbs and releases heat to keep warm beverages at a drinkable temperature for an extended time (YES); "Teddy Needs a Bath" a bag for cleaning stuffed toys in the washing machine (YES); "Sub Zero Ice Cream" an ice cream shop that creates fresh customized dishes that are instantly frozen using liquid nitrogen (NO); "Urbio" modular indoor planters for urban spaces (YES); Update on: Litter (Episode 308); Note: Mark Cuban disqualified himself from the pitch for Urbio because the creators had previously solicited an investment from him, giving him an unfair advantage as he knew more about the product than the other sharks.
52	14	"Episode 414"	February 1, 2013	414	6.73
Sharks: Mark, Daymond, Kevin, Barbara, Robert "Bibbitec" a baby bib that covers the whole body (NO); "SoundBender" a device that directs sound from iPad speakers towards the user (YES); "CuddleTunes" a teddy bear that plays personalized messages (NO); "Xero Shoes" sandals for barefoot runners (NO); Update on: Cousins Maine Lobster (Episode 406)
53	15	"Episode 415"	February 8, 2013	415	6.13
Sharks: Mark, Daymond, Kevin, Barbara, Robert "The Green Garmento" an eco-friendly garment bag (NO); "Grinds" an alternative to chewing tobacco made from ground coffee (YES); "My Cold Snap" an individual ice chest for single cans (NO); "Hoodie Pillow" bed and neck pillows with attached hoods (YES); Update On: Ava the Elephant (Episode 101), CitiKitty (Episode 209); Note: This episode features a past entrepreneur (CitiKitty, Episode 209) returning to pitch for a new product (Hoodie Pillow).
54	16	"Episode 416"	February 15, 2013	416	6.51
Sharks: Mark, Daymond, Kevin, Barbara, Robert "Gotta Have S'More" s'more based muffins (NO); "How Do You Roll?" a create-your-own sushi restaurant (YES); "Pretty Padded Room" online psychotherapy services (NO); "SmartWheel" a prototype steering wheel that prevents distracted driving (YES); Update on: Invis-A-Rack (Episode 302)
55	17	"Episode 417"	February 22, 2013	417	6.51
Sharks: Mark, Daymond, Kevin, Lori, Robert "Addison's Wonderland" customized children's bedspreads (NO); "Muddy Water Camo" more realistic camouflage for duck hunters (NO); "Hip Chixs" premium denim jeans (NO); "Proof Eyewear" handcrafted eyewear made from wood (NO); Update on: Liquid Money (Episode 303)
56	18	"Episode 418"	March 1, 2013	418	6.69
Sharks: Mark, Daymond, Kevin, Barbara, Robert "Nuts 'n More" fortified nut butters (YES); "Psi Bands" an acupressure wrist band for relieving nausea (NO); "Neo Innovations" a home use tattoo removal device (NO); "Jeska Shoe Company" shoes that can change look and style (YES); Update on: SurfSet Fitness (Episode 402)
57	19	"Episode 419"	March 8, 2013	419	6.89
Sharks: Mark, Daymond, Kevin, Lori, Robert "Baby Loves Disco" children's party entertainment (NO); "Lose 12 Inches With Any 12 Workouts" a fitness program that teaches how to improve workout efficiency (YES); "CellHelmet" mobile device cases and screen protectors that include device repair service (NO); "CordaRoy's" bean bag chairs that convert into beds (YES); Update on: The Painted Pretzel (Episode 306)
58	20	"Episode 420"	March 29, 2013	420	6.19
Sharks: Mark, Daymond, Kevin, Lori, Robert "Drop Stop" a device to stop objects from falling between a car seat and the center console (YES); "Traditional Fisheries" a company that promotes consumption of lionfish, an extremely invasive species, in an effort to help the ecology (NO); "Simple Sugars" a sugar scrub that nourishes and exfoliates skin (YES), "CoolWraps" shrink wrap gift bags (YES); Update on: Buggy Beds (Episode 401)
59	21	"Episode 421"	April 5, 2013	421	7.04
Sharks: Mark, Daymond, Kevin, Lori, Robert "Liddup" a cooler with interior LED lighting (YES); "Echo Valley Meats" a gourmet meat business (NO); "Rootsuit" novelty cover-all costumes (NO); "Gobie H2O" advanced filtered water bottles (YES); Update on: The Coop (Episode 411); Note: The creator of Echo Valley Meats would return to the tank in the future (Episode 622) to pitch his company again.
60	22	"Episode 422"	April 26, 2013	423	6.61
Sharks: Mark, Daymond, Kevin, Lori, Robert "Shell Bobbers" a shotgun shell converted into a fishing bobber (YES); "Wicked Good Cupcakes" mail-order cupcakes shipped in jars (YES); "Tremont Electric" a portable generator that uses kinetic energy to power small devices (NO); "The Mission Belt" a ratcheting belt (YES); Update on: Dance With Me (Episode 314)
61	23	"Episode 423"	May 3, 2013	424	5.72
Sharks: Mark, Daymond, Kevin, Lori, Robert "MistoBox" artisan coffees from around the world delivered to your door (YES); "Squirrel Boss" a squirrel-proof bird feeder (NO); "The Vermont Butcher Block & Board Company" premium wooden kitchen products (NO); "Mee-Ma's Louisiana Gumbo Brick" a frozen gumbo base (YES); Update on: eCreamery (Episode 402)
62	24	"Episode 424"	May 10, 2013	425	6.25
Sharks: Mark, Daymond, Kevin, Barbara, Robert "Baby's Badass Burgers" a food truck company wanting to expand into a storefront (NO); "Track Days" a potential movie idea involving motorcycle racing (NO); "KaZAM" a non-pedal bike for helping children learn to ride (YES); "Pink Shutter Photobooths" party photobooths (YES); Update on: Spatty (Episode 405)
63	25	"Episode 425"	May 17, 2013	422	5.11
Sharks: Mark, Daymond, Kevin, Lori, Robert "Jones Scones" traditional British scones (NO); "LugLess" a luggage shipping and delivery service (NO); "Geek Chic" furniture for gamers (YES); "Stella Valle" military-inspired costume jewelry (YES); Update on: Scrub Daddy (Episode 407); Note: This episode was originally scheduled to air on April 19, 2013, but was pre-empted by ABC News coverage of the Boston Marathon bombing.
64	26	"Episode 426"	May 17, 2013	426	6.68
Sharks: Mark, Daymond, Kevin, Barbara, Robert "Three Day Rule" an invite-only dating website (NO); "Ryan's Barkery" all-natural dog treats (YES); "Tom + Chee" a gourmet grilled cheese sandwich restaurant (YES); "VerbalizeIt" a translator service (YES); Update on: Season 4 Recap; Note: This episode concluded with a promotion for the Disney Channel show Phineas and Ferb where Dr. Heinz Doofenshmirtz entered the tank to present a mock pitch to the sharks.
