= Rowbike =

Brand of rowing cycles

The rowbike

A rowbike is an example of a rowing cycle, hybrid fitness/transport machine that combines a bicycle, and a rowing machine. "Rowbike" is a trademark of the Rowbike company. The Rowbike was invented by Scott Olson, the creator of Rollerblade inline skates. "Rowling" is a combination of rowing and rolling, and is sometimes used in place of rowing when describing a Rowbike.

Unlike traditional bicycles, where power is supplied primarily by the rider's legs turning pedals connected to the drive wheel through a looped chain, a Rowbike delivers power through a swinging lever that moves a chain back and forth over the rear cog in a reciprocating motion regulated by a bungee cord. The rowing lever is large enough that a rider will normally utilize muscles from their legs, arms, back and abdomen to maintain a steady rowing motion to keep the Rowbike in motion. Rowbikes are marketed as providing a full body workout through the rowing motion which is gentle on the rider's knees, hips and back due to the system being non-load-bearing.

Though Rowbike is primarily marketed as a fitness machine, as a rowing cycle it may also be classified as a human powered vehicle, as opposed to a stationary indoor rowers. In the United States, Rowbikes are almost exclusively for exercise and fitness, rather than for transportation. Four wheel variants also exist. As with most bicycles, a stationary bike converter stand can be obtained from a third-party vendor to allow the Rowbike to be effectively used as an indoor rower.

== Terminology ==
While many Rowbike parts are standard bicycle parts, several are patented and proprietary to the Rowbike, and can only be obtained from the manufacturer.

- shock cord – A bungee cord with a loop at one end that attaches to a standard bicycle chain with a removable link. It is placed inside the power lever and normally not visible unless the lever is pulled back. The other end of the cord is knotted to prevent slipping. The cord is prone to fatigue over time and must be replaced every few years.
- power lever – a long swinging handlebar with grips and handbrakes that the rider pulls back on to provide propulsion. It is often blue, regardless of the color of the rest of the frame. It may also be called the swing arm.
- Dave Cam – Also called the D Cam, it is the pulley at the end of the power lever.
- Seat Wing – a pair of brackets with three rollers (or 6 rollers in all) that the seat is mounted on that allow the seat assembly to slide back and forth as the rider rows. Riding over rough and uneven pavement causes the rollers, which function as de facto shock absorbers, to wear out rapidly. To minimize the risk of being ejected from the seat after hitting a large bump, the rollers should be replaced regularly.

== Propulsion and steering ==
Steering, braking, shifting, and propulsion are accomplished through the handlebars. The brakes and brake levers are standard bicycle components. The handle bars are specific to the Rowbike and cannot be upgraded, although standard grips, bar ends, and other accessories can be mounted on them. The front fork is controlled (or steered) with cables in a manner similar to a recumbent bicycle. The gears on the rear wheel, the shifter, and the derailleur are all standard bicycle equipment. Feet are on fixed foot rests, as opposed to moving pedals. The seat, which is specific to the RowBike, slides back and forth on rollers. Unlike a boat the rider faces forward. If the rider's stroke favors the left or right side, the rowbike will turn in that direction, similar to how a row boat is turned. Balancing on a two-wheeled rowbike while rowing requires some practice, even for a skilled bicyclist.

== Drive train ==
Rowbikes transmit power from the rider to the wheels using a standard bicycle chain, rear gears, and derailleur. Both wheels are standard bicycle wheels, the rear wheel is fitted out with a standard freewheel. The chain on a Rowbike does not travel in a loop, as is the case with a standard bicycle. It moves back and forth over the rear cog in a sawing motion. The chain is connected at one end to the frame of the rowbike and to the shock cord (bungee cord) on the other. As the rower pulls back the chain engages the rear cog and the bungee cord, which is concealed in the power lever, is extended, and when the rower returns forward the bungee cord contracts, pulling the chain back and ensuring there is no slack in the chain.

Rowbikes have a rear derailleur if they have a multiple chain ring rear hub. The latest design has a NuVinci infinite ratio internally geared hub in the rear wheel, and has a single chain ring and no derailleur, similar to the original single speed models first produced.

If the gears on the rear wheel are not optimal an ordinary bicycle has the possibility of changing the size of the gear on the crankset(the chainring). Unlike a bicycle a Rowbike does not have a crank set. To optimize the gearing a pulley called the "Dave Cam" was introduced in 2006. The Dave Cam doubles the amount of chain pulled with each stroke, as a larger chainring increases the amount of chain pulled with each revolution of the pedals.

== History ==
The idea of a rowed cycle dates back to at least the 1870s, and several variants have been developed commercially and sold, but there does not seem to be any evidence of a successful mass market design. As of 2018 Rowbikes and other rowed bicycles have not found broad appeal, possibly due to their having a relatively high asking price when compared to indoor rowers. Scott Olson is quoted as saying "the jury is still out on rowbike".

A newsreel from 1937 shows a rowed bicycle that is similar to the Rowbike. Instead of a bungee cord, it uses a circular chain case mounted to the rear wheel with a spring to maintain chain tension. Like the first version of the Rowbike, there is no "Dave cam" pulley between the lever and the chain.

== See also ==
- Handcycles
- Quadracycle (human-powered vehicle)
- Rowed vehicles
- Rowing machine
- Tricycle
