= Scott B. Olson =

American inventor, entrepreneur, and former hockey player

Scott Olson
- Born: 1959 (age 66–67)
- Occupations: Inventor; entrepreneur; former hockey player
- Known for: Founder of Rollerblade

Scott B. Olson (born 1959) is an American inventor, entrepreneur, and former hockey player. Olson developed and popularized the first modern inline skates trademarked as Rollerblade in the 1980s, launching a new recreational sport. Olson holds a dozen patent applications for skate- and sport-related innovations from 1982 through 2001. Olson subsequently built and marketed SwitchIt skates, Rowbike, and Skyride.

== Developing modern inline skates ==
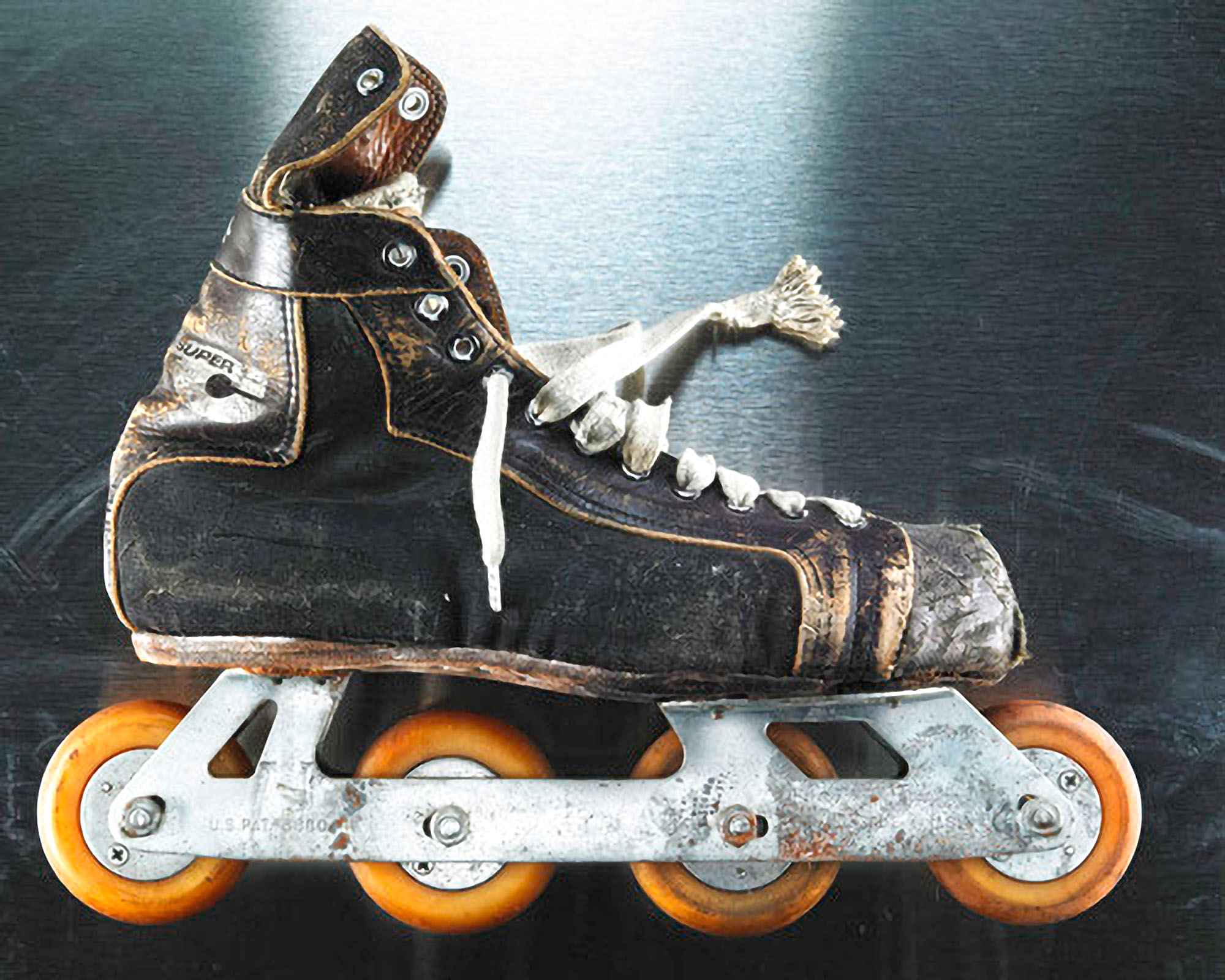
CCM Tacks boot riveted to Super Street Skate ca. 1980

For two centuries, inventors and entrepreneurs attempted to popularize skates with a single row of wheels. By the end of the 1970s, only Chicago Roller-Blade (Note: See ads for the Chicago Roller-Blade in the 1965 Fall & Winter Montgomery Ward catalog, page 1082, archived here, and in the 1965 Spring & Summer Catalog, page 846, archived here.) and Super Sport Skate (Note: See ad for Super Sport Skates endorsed by Ralph Backstrom in "Faceoff" 73 / 74 season by World Hockey Association. Also see archived pictures one, two, three and four, from an antique listing.) managed to gain limited adoption for training, within a niche community of ice hockey players. It took Olson, his brothers, his family, his friends, and his company, Rollerblade, to perfect these skates, and to make them enjoyable as mainstream recreation for the general population.

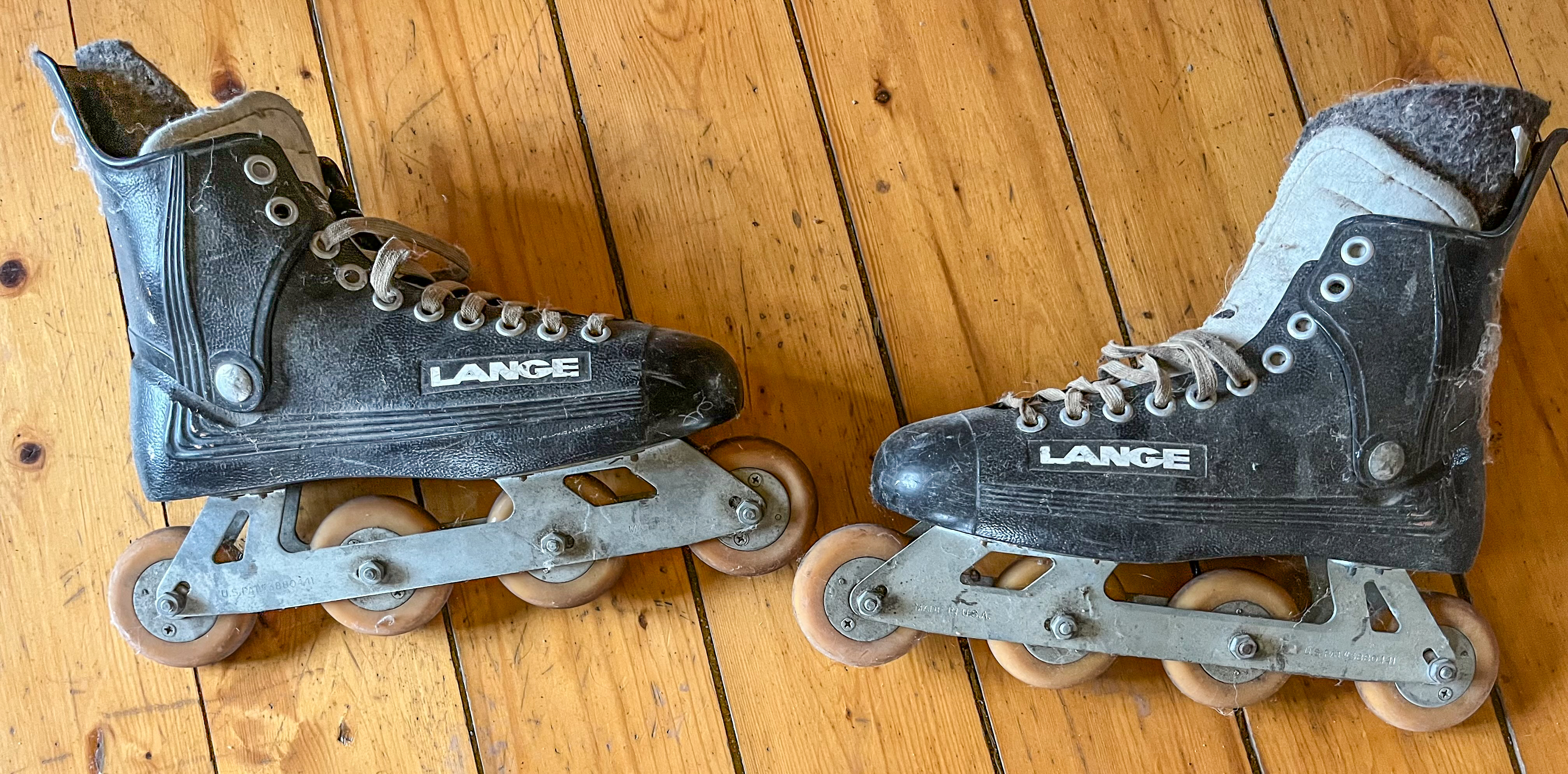
Skates used by Mark Lipson and Scott Olson ca. 1980 in a 200-mile marketing trip (Note: The MIA exhibit story from 2015 includes a picture showing Scott Olson holding two prototype skates: 1) Lange boot on Super Street Skate skate with cream-colored wheels (1979), and 2) CCM Tacks hockey skate boot on his own adjustable/expandable skate design with orange polyurethane wheels (1981). Said picture is archived here. The same two prototype skates are also seen in the main article picture of this Rollerblade article from 2019, archived here. The article picture is archived here.)

In 1979, Scott Olson, then an ice hockey player, stumbled upon the Super Sport Skate (or Super Street Skate). Fascinated by these novelty skates, he soon made a living promoting and selling them to hockey players in Minneapolis. As a licensed distributor, Olson traveled on these skates through the city and around the state in guerrilla marketing tours to promote the product. Scott and his brother Brennan tinkered with these skates. They removed the wheel frames from Super Street Skate, and custom-fitted them to customers' old hockey boots for improved ankle support. Wearing plastic Lange boots thus retrofitted, Scott and his friend Mark Lipson skated for 200 miles from Minneapolis to Grand Rapids, Minn., in a five-day marketing campaign.

Through further tinkering, prototyping and road testing everywhere he could, Olson eventually arrived at a skate design with an adjustable/expandable frame, polyurethane wheels and double ball bearings. The skate rolled faster, and remained more reliable on road surfaces. (Note: See pictures of early prototypes of Ultimate Street Skate with "Ole's Innovative Sports" stamped on their frames, from this page on Vintage Minnesota Hockey, such as this picture, this picture and this picture, plus this ad. Archived here, with picture, picture, picture and picture.) But a patent search turned up the Chicago Roller-Blade, which claimed many of his design features. In 1981, Olson persuaded the Chicago Roller Skate Company to give him the patent, in exchange for a percentage of the profit.

In 1981, Olson created a company called Ole's Innovative Sports, and made manufacturing arrangements. Soon, he marketed his own "Ultimate Street Skates" (or Ultimate Hockey Skates), a skate of his own design attached to a hard boot with thick liners, similar to plastic hockey boots that traced back to Lange ski boot designs. By then, skateboards had adopted polyurethane wheels made by roller skate manufacturers, with standard ISO 608 ball bearings. Olson similarly adopted polyurethane roller skate wheels from Kryptonics, shaving tens of thousands to fit them to his Ultimate skates. These skates came with a toe brake and had the now-familiar Rollerblade logo imprinted on them, which Olson and his friend designed. (Note: See a roadshow display of the Ultimate Hockey Skate here, archived here, from this article, archived here.) (Note: A picture of the 1981 Ultimate Hockey Skate is shown under the headline: "Modern inline skate", on page 11 of the book Superguides: Inline Skating published by DK.)

== Popularizing Rollerblade skates ==
In 1982, Scott Olson started to market his skates as a proper sport in itself, venturing out of the initial niche where they served as an off-season training tool for ice hockey. Scott organized Minnesota hockey players to fly east to play roller hockey teams in New York City, with his team skating on Ultimate Street Skates, and the NYC teams on traditional 2x2 skates. Scott also started to advertise his skates to the masses, in print and in person, as everyday fun activities, where one could "roll over large sidewalk craters without feeling them". Enthusiasts colloquially referred to these skates as "roller blades".

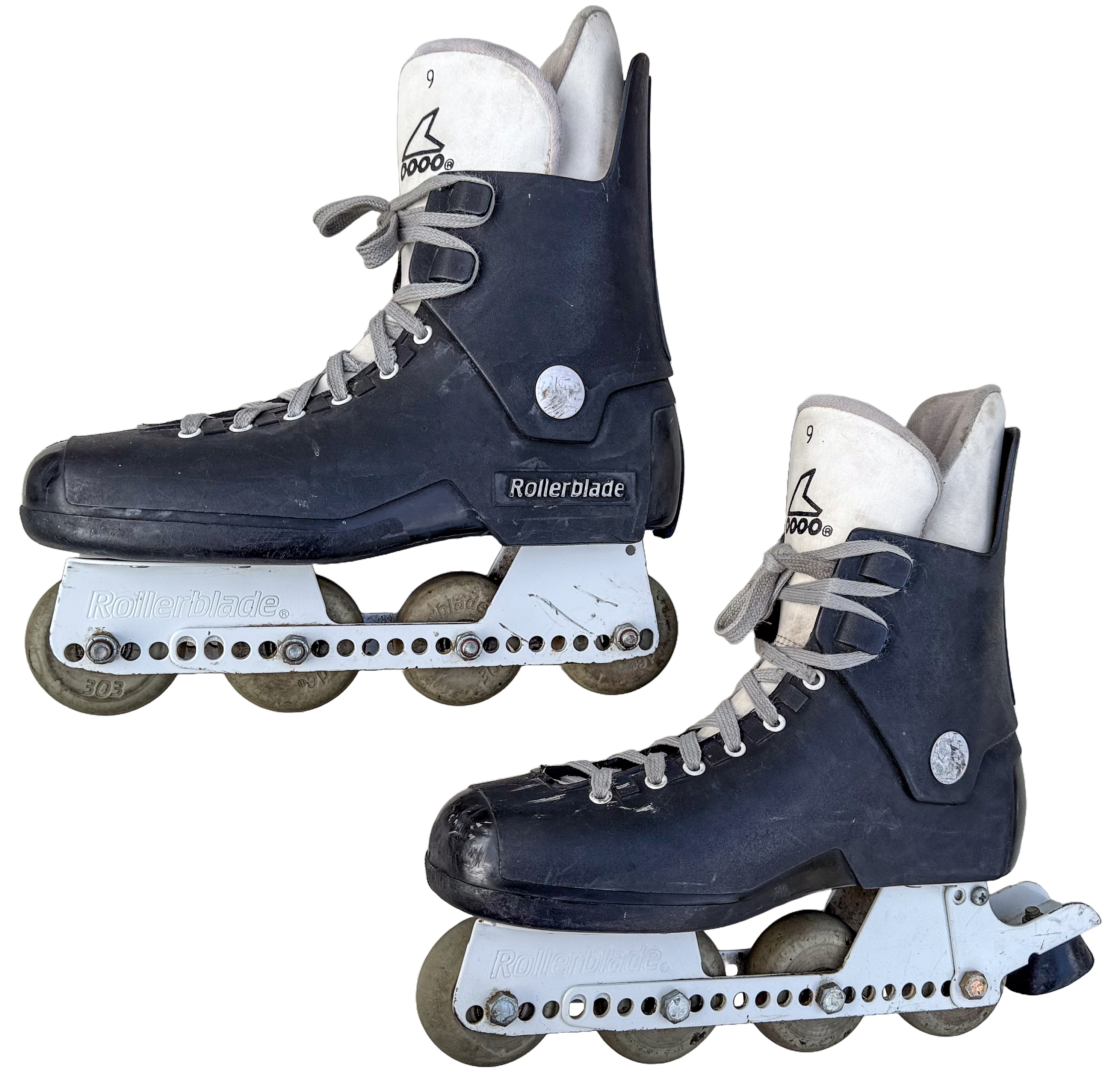
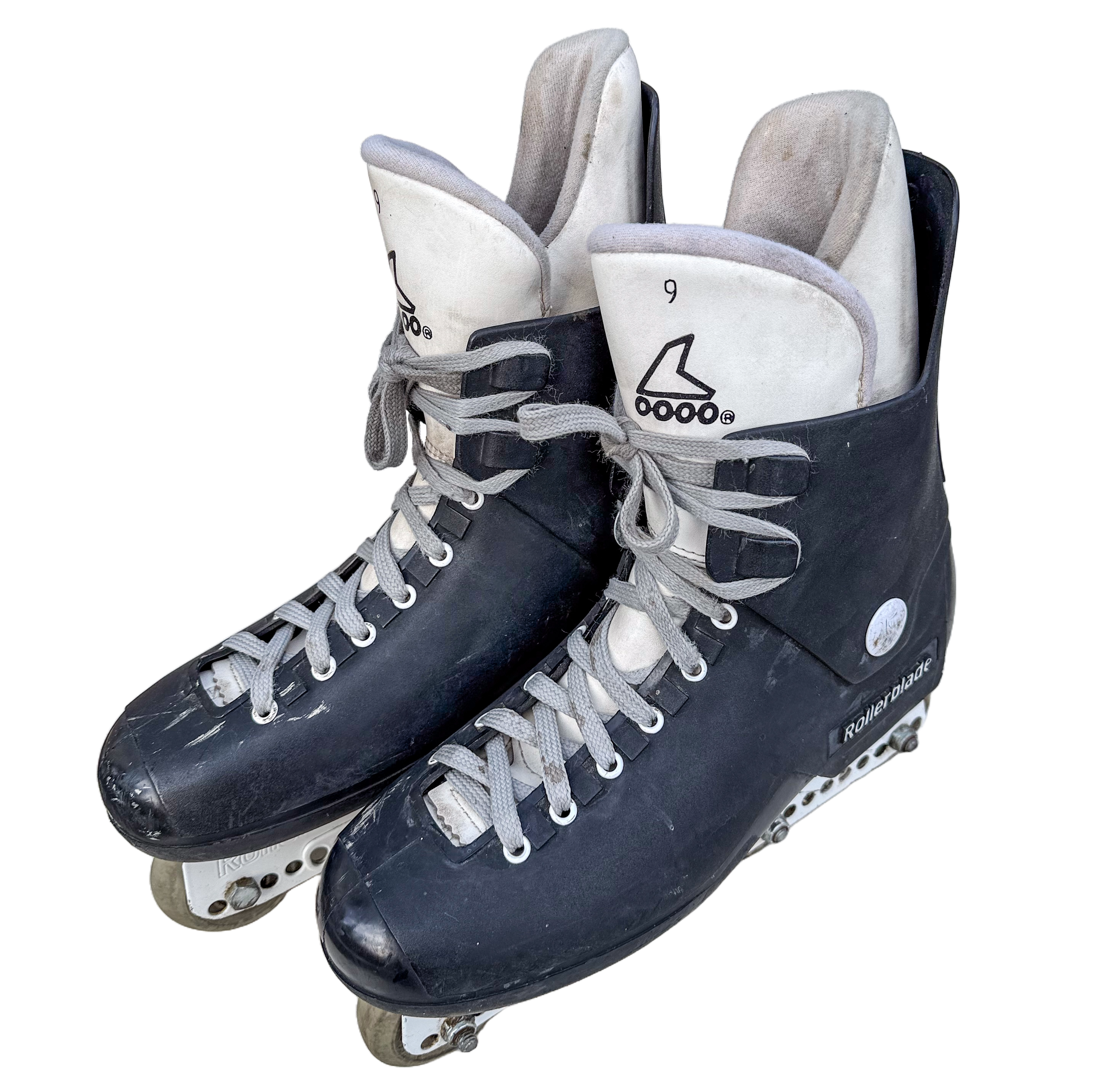
Rollerblade skates with heel brakes - 1983

In 1983, Olson marketed a new generation of skates with heel brakes instead of toe brakes, under the trademark "Rollerblade". His company grew from one worker in 1980 to 25 employees in 1985, selling many thousands of units that year. (Note: See pictures of the new generation of early Rollerblade skates with heel brakes, from Vintage Minnesota Hockey: picture, picture, picture and picture, archived here, here, here and here. These have a refined version of the adjustable frame from the Ultimate Street Skate, and a similar hard boot. These skates witnessed the transition of Scott Olson's company from "Ole's Innovative Sports", to "North American Sports Training Corp.", and finally to "Rollerblade", as attested by marketing materials.) In the same year, the company published a book, Rollerblades: Dryland Training for Ice Hockey, edited by Chris Middlebrook, with chapters written by Randy Gregg, Jack Blatherwick, Laura Stamm, Brad Buetow, Scott Olson, and Brennan Olson. This is the first book that elaborated on the equivalency of inline and ice hockey skates with respect to hockey moves, and the first book that documented wheel rockering adjustments, wheel wear, and wheel rotations.

Around 1986, Ole's Innovative Sports was renamed "North American Sports Training Corporation" (NASTC). As the Rollerblade brand became more popular, the company was eventually renamed to Rollerblade Inc. around 1988.

== Other notable ventures ==
=== SwitchIt ===
Scott Olson was forced to sell a majority stake in his company in 1984 due to financial difficulties, and within a few years he was pushed out of Rollerblade, the company he had founded. Undeterred, he continued to innovate, developing a skate with interchangeable steel blades for ice skating and wheels for inline skating. He initially called the product Switchblade under his new company, Innovative Sports Systems, but later renamed it SwitchIt to avoid legal conflicts with Rollerblade. After several years of development, the skate was available for purchase by around 1990. (Note: See SwitchIt ad on page 11 of the premier issue of Skaters magazine in 1990.) Olson ultimately sold SwitchIt and Innovative Sports Systems to his business partner around 1992.

=== Rowbike ===
Around 1991, Scott Olson began developing what would become the Rowbike, a hybrid of a low-slung recumbent bicycle and a rowing machine. The rider’s feet rest on forward supports, while a handlebar connected to a power bar allows for a rowing motion that propels the bike. This design delivers a full-body workout, with coasting speeds reaching up to 17 mph. After roughly four years of development, Rowbike entered production around 1995-1996 and received positive coverage from major news outlets and sports publications. By 1999, the lineup had expanded to include multiple models, such as a speed shifter, a children’s version, and a three-wheeled variant. Olson licensed Rowbike in 2015, but still retains ownership of Rowbike as of 2026.

=== Skyride ===
Skyride originated in 1996 as an idea to combine fitness training with the experience of a roller coaster. However, it wasn’t until 2010 that Scott Olson began building early prototypes. The concept evolved into a human-powered monorail system, in which a suspended pod travels along an elevated track and is driven by the rider through interchangeable fitness mechanisms such as bicycle pedals or rowing-style handles.

Olson later pitched the project on Shark Tank (Season 3, Episode 13, aired May 4, 2012), but did not secure a deal. Despite this, he continued developing and promoting the system.

In 2016, Carnival Cruise Line introduced Skyride as a signature attraction aboard the Carnival Vista, featuring two elevated oval tracks positioned roughly 150 feet above sea level and spanning nearly a third of the ship’s length. By 2020, Skyride was operating on three Vista-class ships: Vista, Horizon, and Panorama, traveling worldwide.

In 2024, South Korea-based adventure and attractions company Adventure Inc. became an international distributor for Skyride, showcasing the system at the 2024 Dubai Entertainment, Amusement & Leisure Expo (DEAL), further expanding its global visibility.
