= Shark Tank season 2 =

Shark Tank
- Season 2
- No. of episodes: 9

Release
- Original network: ABC
- Original release: March 20 – May 13, 2011

Season chronology
- ← Previous; Season 1 Next → Season 3

This is a list of episodes from the second season of Shark Tank.

== Episodes ==
Daymond John, Kevin O'Leary, Barbara Corcoran, and Robert Herjavec appear as the sharks in every episode this season. Kevin Harrington is credited as a main shark, but his slot is filled in by guest sharks Mark Cuban and Jeff Foxworthy in select episodes.

No. overall	No. in season	Title	Original release date	Prod. code	U.S. viewers (millions)
15	1	"Episode 201"	March 20, 2011	205	6.13
Guest Shark: Mark Cuban "Wurkin Stiffs" magnetic collar-stays (YES); "Tippi Toes" a children's exercise program franchise (YES); "CBS Foods" (now Big Shake's Hot Chicken and Fish) shrimp-based burgers (NO); "Copa di Vino" a proprietary container for a single serving of wine by the glass (NO); Update on: Classroom Jams (Episode 102); Note: The creator of Copa di Vino would return to the tank in the future (Episode 311) to pitch his product again.
16	2	"Episode 202"	March 25, 2011	202	4.65
Guest Shark: Mark Cuban "Toygaroo" a toy subscription service (YES); "Wake n' Bacon" an alarm clock that wakes you up with fresh bacon (NO); "Vurtego" extreme pogo sticks (NO); "First Defense Nasal Screen" a personal air filtration system (YES); Update on: Granola Gourmet (Episode 105)
17	3	"Episode 203"	April 1, 2011	206	4.87
"Mod Mom Furniture" modernized toy boxes (YES); "Fitness Stride" an exercise device (NO); "Flipoutz" armbands you personalize with coins (YES); "Pure Ayre" a more effective odor remover (NO); Update on: Grill Charms (Episode 107)
18	4	"Episode 204"	April 8, 2011	203	4.67
Guest Shark: Jeff Foxworthy "Ride-On Carry-On" luggage with a built-in child chair (YES); "Uncle Zip's Beef Jerky" beef jerky made without preservatives (NO); "Hillbilly Brand" a specialty clothing brand marketed towards "rednecks" and "hillbillies" (YES); "Broccoli Wad" a mafia-inspired money clip (YES); Update on: Ava the Elephant (Episode 101); Note: The Sopranos star Vincent Pastore makes a cameo to pitch for Broccoli Wad.
19	5	"Episode 115"	April 15, 2011	115	5.28
"Fridge Fronts" magnetic decorative covers for refrigerators (YES); "New Era Brands" clip-on gum and contact lens cases (NO); "Thin Gloss" weight loss lip gloss (NO); "Lightfilm" light-up decals for car windows (YES); Update on: Nubrella (Episode 114); Note: This episode was originally produced as part of the first season, but was not broadcast until season two.
20	6	"Episode 205"	April 22, 2011	207	4.83
"Hot Mama Gowns" luxury maternity gowns (NO); "Caddy Swag" a drink cooler designed for golf bags (NO); "Daisy Cakes" mail-order cakes (YES); "Sweep Easy" a broom with a built-in scraper (YES); Update on: Grease Monkey Wipes (Episode 112)
21	7	"Episode 206"	April 29, 2011	201	4.58
Guest Shark: Jeff Foxworthy "Carsik Bib" a bib for carsick children (NO); "Hydromax" a hydration system for football players (YES); "Ecomowers" an eco-friendly manual lawn mower that doesn't require blade sharpening (NO); "Games2U" mobile party games franchise (NO); Update on: Body Jac (Episode 105)
22	8	"Episode 207"	May 6, 2011	204	4.45
Guest Shark: Mark Cuban "Origaudio" innovative portable speakers (YES); "Man Candle" masculine scented candles (NO); "Original Runner Company" aisle runners for weddings and special events (NO); "HyConn" a connector for fire hydrant hoses that is faster and easier to use (YES)
23	9	"Episode 208"	May 13, 2011	208	4.99
"CitiKitty" a toilet training product for cats (YES); "Samson Martin" T-shirts for expecting moms (NO); "Aldo Orta Jewelry" mass market versions of custom jewelry (YES); "One Sole" shoes with replaceable tops (YES); Update on: Voyage Air Guitar (Episode 103); Note: The creator of CitiKitty would return to the tank in the future (Episode 415) to pitch for a new product.
