= Shark Tank season 1 =

Shark Tank
- Season 1
- No. of episodes: 14

Release
- Original network: ABC
- Original release: August 9, 2009 – February 5, 2010

Season chronology
- Next → Season 2

This is a list of episodes from the first season of Shark Tank.

== Episodes ==
Kevin Harrington, Daymond John, Kevin O'Leary, Barbara Corcoran, and Robert Herjavec appear as the sharks in every episode this season.

No. overall	No. in season	Title	Original release date	Prod. code	U.S. viewers (millions)
1	1	"Episode 101"	August 9, 2009	101	4.15
Mr. Tod's Pie Factory: a pie company (Accepted offer from Daymond John and Barbara Corcoran of $460,000 for 50% equity); Ionic Ear: an implantable Bluetooth device requiring surgery to insert the device into the user's head (No deals secured); WiSpots: an electronic hand-held device for waiting rooms (No deals secured); Emmy the Elephant (later trademarked as Ava the Elephant): a plastic elephant-shaped device that helps parents give small children oral medicine (Accepted Barbara Corcoran's offer of $50,000 for 55% equity); College Foxes Packing Boxes: a packing and organizing service based on College Hunks Hauling Junk (No deals secured)
2	2	"Episode 102"	August 16, 2009	102	5.59
Crooked Jaw: a mixed martial arts clothing line (No deals secured); Lifebelt: a device that prevents the car from starting without the seat belt being fastened (No deals secured); A Perfect Pear: a gourmet food business (Accepted offer from Kevin Harrington and Robert Herjavec of $500,000 for 50% equity); Sticky Note Holder: a Post-It note arm for laptops (No deals secured); Classroom Jams: a musical way to teach students Shakespeare (Sold company to all five sharks for $250,000 with 5% royalties in perpetuity)
3	3	"Episode 103"	August 23, 2009	103	5.45
Turbobaster: a cooking device (Sold company to Kevin Harrington for $35,000 and 2% royalties in perpetuity); Chopstick Art: household items made from recycled chopsticks (No deals secured); Stress Free Kids: a line of books that use stress relieving techniques to calm kids to sleep (Accepted Barbara Corcoran's offer of $250,000 for 50% equity); 50 State Capitals in 50 Minutes: flashcards to help memorize the American capitals (No deals secured); Voyage Air Guitar: a guitar design that folds the guitar into a backpack (No deals secured) (Note: The creator of Voyage Air Guitar would return to the tank in the future and eventually agree to a deal, but none of the subsequent negotiations were televised.)
4	4	"Episode 104"	August 30, 2009	104	4.89
Gift Card Rescue: a website that buys and resells unused gift cards (Accepted offer from Kevin O'Leary and Robert Herjavec of $200,000 with 50% equity); Soul's Calling: a line of inspirational accessories and gift items (No deals secured); Coffee Brand Gifts: a company that holds the patents to put the words "Cappuccino", "Coffee", and "Java" on plush toys (No deals secured); Graffiti Removal Services: a graffiti removal service franchise (No deals secured); Coverplay: a slip cover for children's travel play yards (Accepted offer from Barbara Corcoran of $350,000 for 40% equity)
5	5	"Episode 105"	September 6, 2009	105	3.35
Body Jac: a fitness machine to make pushups easier (Accepted Barbara Corcoran's offer of $180,000 for 50% equity); Face Blok: a line of stylized surgical face masks (No deals secured); Granola Gourmet: a line of granola bars that diabetics can eat (No deals secured); Good Grief Celebrations: a funeral concierge service (No deals secured); My Therapy Journal: a web site that allows people to write in a journal and gauge their emotional state (Accepted $80,000 offer from Kevin O'Leary and Robert Herjavec for 51% equity)
6	6	"Episode 106"	September 13, 2009	106	4.20
Element Bars: a company that manufactures custom energy bars (Accepted Kevin Harrington's offer of $150,000 for 30% equity and 4% royalties in perpetuity); The Fizz: a reinvention of the root beer float that screws onto soda bottles (No deals secured); Underease Underwear: protective underwear for flatulence (No deals secured); Kalyx: a line of sports bras (No deals secured); Pork Barrel BBQ: a barbecue sauce and spice rub (Accepted Barbara Corcoran's offer of $50,000 for 50% equity); Update on Mr. Tod's Pie Factory (Episode 101)
7	7	"Episode 107"	September 29, 2009	107	4.75
Grill Charms: stainless steel tags that identify different cooking specifications of various meats when on the grill (Accepted Robert Herjavec's offer of $50,000 for 25% equity); FunHouse: an entertainment venue in Times Square, New York (No deals secured); Boogie Box Fitness: aerobics fitness programs, classes, and DVDs (No deals secured); Soy-Yer-Dough: soybean based modeling dough for those with a wheat allergy (Accepted $300,000 offer from Daymond John, Kevin O'Leary, and Robert Herjavec for 51% equity); Update on A Perfect Pear (Episode 102)
8	8	"Episode 108"	October 6, 2009	108	5.15
Notehall: a website that buys and sells college class notes and study guides (Accepted Barbara Corcoran's offer of $90,000 for 25% equity); Treasure Chest Pets: an organizer for children designed like a stuffed toy (Accepted $150,000 offer from Barbara Corcoran and Daymond John for 60% equity); Throx: a company that sells socks in sets of threes (No deals secured); Washed Up Hollywood: a belt and belt buckle manufacturer (No deals secured); Update on Coverplay (Episode 104)
9	9	"Episode 109"	October 13, 2009	109	5.24
Chill Soda: a healthy soda (Accepted Barbara Corcoran's offer of $50,000 for 20% equity); Cornucopia: a veterinarian who created pet food he claims could extend a pet's life (No deals secured); VirtuSphere: a large sphere one can walk in to experience virtual reality environments (No deals secured); Gayla Bentley Fashion: a fashion line for women over size 12 (Accepted $250,000 offer from Barbara Corcoran and Daymond John for 50% equity); Update on Ava the Elephant (Episode 101)
10	10	"Episode 111"	October 20, 2009	111	5.92
The Bobble Place: a custom bobble head doll company (No deals secured); Mr. Poncho: a poncho for mobile devices to avoid tangled headphones (No deals secured); Uroclub: a portable urinal created by a urologist and hidden in a golf club (Accepted Kevin Harrington's offer of $25,000 for 70% equity); Jump Forward: a technological solution for sports recruiting from high school to college (Accepted $600,000 offer from Kevin O'Leary and Robert Herjavec for 50% equity); Update on Pork Barrel BBQ (Episode 106)
11	11	"Episode 112"	January 8, 2010	112	3.94
Romp n' Roll: a children's entertainment center franchise (No deals secured); Hells Bells: a helmet company that has a patented method to produce 3-D designs (Accepted Daymond John's offer of $200,000 for 50% equity); The Twister: a golf ball cleaner (No deals secured); The Chef in Black: a dried Chinese salad dressing (Accepted Barbara Corcoran's offer of $50,000 for 35% equity); Ink Flip: a mail-order printer ink refill service (No deals secured); Update on Stress Free Kids (Episode 103)
12	12	"Episode 113"	January 15, 2010	113	4.43
The Factionist: an environmentally friendly T-shirt line (No deals secured); Podillow: a more comfortable tanning and massage pillow (No deals secured); Wee Can Shop: a gift shop for children (No deals secured); Grease Monkey Wipes: effective cleaning and degreasing wet wipes (Accepted Barbara Corcoran's offer of $40,000 for 40% equity); Update on Body Jac (Episode 105)
13	13	"Episode 114"	January 29, 2010	114	4.40
Lipstix Remix" a lipstick mold that combines used lipsticks into a new stick (Accepted $105,000 offer with Barbara Corcoran, Daymond John, and Kevin Harrington for 50% equity); Captain Ice Cream: an ice cream vending business (No deals secured); Caffeindicator: a decaf coffee testing system incorporated onto sweetener packets (Accepted $200,000 offer from Kevin O'Leary for 50% equity); Legal Grind: a coffee shop that provides legal services (No deals secured); Update on Treasure Chest Pets (Episode 108)
14	14	"Episode 110"	February 5, 2010	110	4.65
Send A Ball: greeting balls sent in the mail (No deals secured); Qubits: a bendable construction toy (Accepted Daymond John's offer of $90,000 for 51% equity); Pillars of Slippers: an in-home shoe party franchise (No deals secured); Llama Brew: liquid llama fertilizer (No deals secured); Nubrella: a wearable umbrella (Accepted $200,000 offer with Daymond John and Kevin Harrington for 25% equity); Update on Lifebelt (Episode 102)
