= Rowing cycle =

Wheeled vehicle propelled by a rowing motion of the body

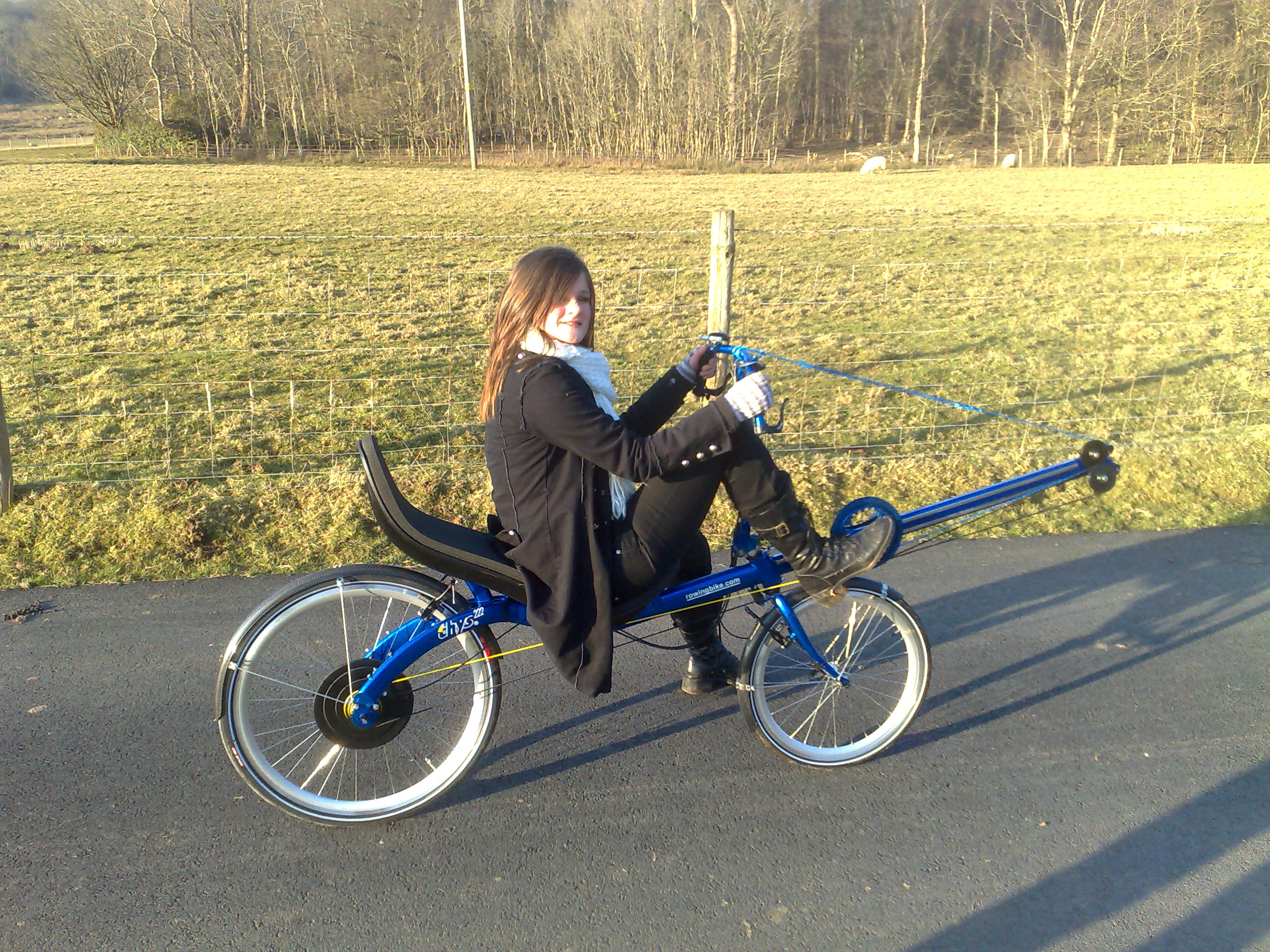
Thys rowingbike

A rowing cycle is a wheeled vehicle propelled by a rowing motion of the body. Steering, braking, and shifting are usually done by the handlebars. Feet are on symmetrical foot rests, as opposed to rotating pedals. Unlike many rowing boats, the rider faces forward. Rowing cycles exist in numerous designs, particularly with respect to frames and drive mechanisms. Commercial production numbers for rowing cycles are small compared to that of standard bicycles.

== History ==
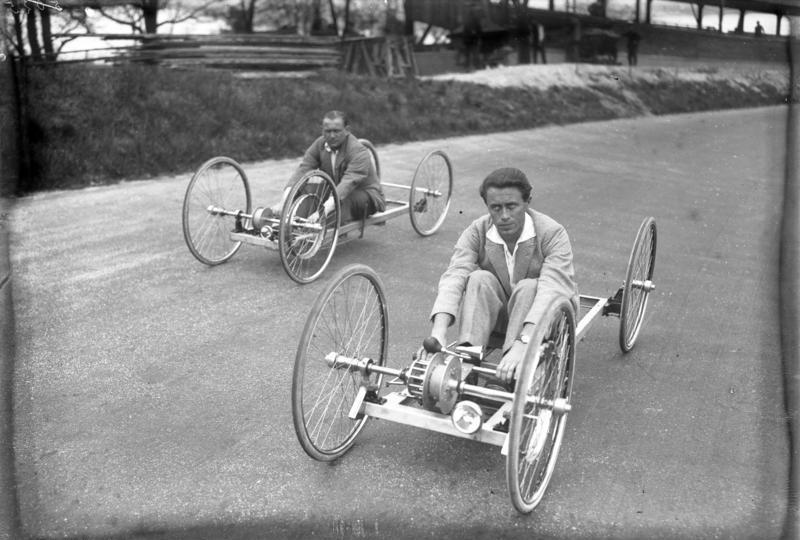
Landskiffs in 1927

The use of a rowing-like action to propel a land vehicle goes probably to the 1870s, as George W. Lee used a sliding-seat in a tricycle. Roadsculler races were held in Madison Square Garden in the 1880s. A toy catalog from FAO Schwarz in 1911 advertised a four-wheeled "Row-Cycle" for children, operated using two levers in a standing position and with steering done by the feet. In the 1920s, Manfred Curry in Germany designed and constructed the Landskiff ("land boat"), a four-wheeled vehicle that would be known as a Rowmobile in the English speaking countries. A newsreel from 1937 shows a rowed bicycle that is very similar to today's Craftsbury SS rowing bicycle, Rowbike and VogaBike.

== Propulsion and steering ==
Some rowed vehicles use a stroke similar to a boat, in that force is used only when straightening the body, the drive portion of the stroke, not the recovery. Other rowed vehicles, mostly those that use linkages and crankshafts in their drive trains, use force in both straightening and bending the body. On most, the handlebars move; most also have moving footrests and some have a moving seat.

The handle bars on some rowed vehicles travel on a semicircular path due to the handlebars being mounted to a fixed length lever pinned to the frame. Some attempt to simulate the more level stroke used in rowing a boat, for example Streetrower and Vogabike. The September 2007 issue of Velovision magazine claimed that Streetrower has "the most natural rowing action of any rowing vehicle to date".

The Streetrower uses a steering system actuated by servomechanisms and controlled by the rider with a joy stick.

== Drive train ==
Rowed vehicles generally have one of three drive trains: chain, linkages, or cable.

The Rowbike brand uses a standard bicycle chain, rear gears, and derailleur. The chain does not travel in a loop, as is the case with a standard bicycle. It moves back and forth over the rear cog in a reciprocating motion. The chain is connected at one end to the frame of the rowbike and to a bungee cord on the other. As the rower pulls back the chain engages the rear cog and the bungee cord is extended, and when the rower returns forward the bungee cord contracts, pulling the chain back and ensuring there is no slack in the chain. All Rowbikes have a rear derailleur, even single speeds, due to the need to keep proper tension in the chain.

Rowbikes that use linkages include Champiot and Powerpumper. They use linkages connected to a crank shaft, similar to a pedal car.

The Thys Rowingbike and Streetrower use a cable which coils and uncoils about a spiral-shaped spool. Thys calls his version a snek drive (after the Dutch term for Fusee (horology)).

== Tandem, three and four wheeled variants ==
Balancing on a two-wheeled rowed vehicle while rowing requires some practice, even for a skilled bicyclist. Tricycle and quadracycle forms are usually heavier but do not share this problem. The Streetrower is a tricycle with two wheels at the front and one at the rear; the Vogatrike also has three wheels. An early quadracycle, the 'Irish Mail', was similar to railroad handcars used by railroad workers to inspect tracks. The four-wheeled Champiot is reminiscent of the 'Irish Mail' type machine in that it uses linkages, not a chain, in its drive train.

Thys has produced a tandem rowingbike.

== See also ==
- Handcycles
- Indoor rower
- Outline of cycling
- Quadracycle (human-powered vehicle)
- Tricycle
- Some types of Railway Handcar use a rowing cycle for propulsion, typically crank based to get the most from the rider.
