= Talbott Teas =

Chicago based tea company

Talbott Teas is a gourmet tea brand founded in Chicago. Founders Shane Talbott and Steven Nakisher appeared on Shark Tank and accepted an offer from Kevin O'Leary of $250,000 for a 35% equity stake. Jamba Juice acquired certain assets of the business in January 2012.

== Company history ==
Talbott Teas was founded in 2003 by Shane Talbott and Dr. Steven Nakisher. Shane Talbott spent more than 20 years in the salon and spa industry and has served as Oprah Winfrey’s personal hair colorist for 10 years. Dr. Steven Nakisher is a psychologist and entrepreneur.

Talbott Teas created special blends for the arts and entertainment industry including for Warner Brothers' 70th anniversary of The Wizard of Oz: The Ruby Slippers Blend, the Joffrey Ballet's performances of The Nutcracker: Clara's Tea Slippers Blend, and a gift sets for the cast and crew of Slumdog Millionaire at the 2009 Academy Awards.

Talbott won two awards for its Chocolate Almond Allure tea at the AIDS Foundation of Chicago's Annual World of Chocolate Event in December 2011. In 2010, Talbott Teas was selected as one of Oprah's Favorite Things.

Nakisher and Talbott appeared on Shark Tank in an episode broadcast on February 17, 2012. They requested $250,000 for a 20% equity stake and accepted Kevin O'Leary's offer of the same amount for 35% equity.

Jamba's annual report records the acquisition of certain Talbott Teas assets as completed on January 27, 2012, before the episode's broadcast. The transaction included $400,000 in cash paid at closing and contingent payments based on the acquired assets' future performance.
