= UniKey =

Security technologies company

UniKey Technologies
- Company type: Private
- Industry: Technology; Access control Home security Software
- Founded: 2010
- Founder: Phil Dumas (president & CEO)
- Headquarters: Orlando, Florida
- Brands: Kwikset Kevo
- Number of employees: 40–60
- Website: unikey.com

UniKey Technologies is an alternative access control company based in the United States that designs and licenses keyless entry technology worldwide. Its first product in partnership with Kwikset was Kēvo, a Bluetooth-enabled deadbolt door lock.

== History ==
UniKey Technologies was founded in 2010 in Florida by Phil Dumas. Dumas previously worked to develop SmartScan, fingerprint-reading residential deadbolt lock which Dumas described as too unreliable. He started UniKey to sell locks which use smartphone technology to open locks instead of physical keys.

In May 2012 Dumas and UniKey Technologies appeared on ABC's reality series Shark Tank. Although UniKey received multiple investment offers on the show, no deal was finalized.

== Kēvo Lock ==
Launched in 2013, Kēvo was the first Bluetooth-enabled touch-to-open smart lock. Kēvo can detect a user's compatible smartphone or tablet (via an app) to lock and unlock the door. The deadbolt lock detects when the user's phone is nearby and if it's outside; the phone emits a low-energy Bluetooth signal, allowing the door to be unlocked when the lock face is touched, making it unnecessary to interact with the phone in order to open the door. Users can grant unrestricted or temporary access to other phones as well. Kēvo also comes with a keychain fob that provides the same touch-to-open function as an authorized smart phone. The device also has the ability to detect whether a verified device is currently inside or outside the home. If an authorized device is known to be inside the house, unauthorized users are unable to activate Kēvo from outside.

In October 2025, UniKey announced that in response to Assa Abloy (who had bought out Kwikset) announcing termination of Kevo infrastructure, they would be taking over and keeping the Kevo service and mobile apps operational.

== Partnerships ==
In June 2014, UniKey and MIWA Lock Company announced a partnership to offer keyless entry to hotels. UniKey developed a touch-to-open passive keyless entry system to be integrated into MIWA's existing radio-frequency identification hospitality locks. The keys are activated through smartphone apps. When guests check in through the app, they are sent their room number and the phone is enabled to act as a virtual key.
