= Cellhelmet =

Cellhelmet is a mobile accessories manufacturer/distributor, headquartered in Pittsburgh, Pennsylvania with a satellite office in Shenzhen, founded in 2012. The company appeared on ABC's Shark Tank on March 8, 2013. Cellhelmet is a registered trademark of Kane and McHenry Enterprises, LLC. Its original business model was to include accidental damage coverage with its mobile phone accessories, should they fail to protect a given device. If a device breaks inside of a cellhelmet case, the company will repair or replace it, according to coverage terms. Since, the company has introduced various other cell phone accessory lines, including screen protection products, chargers, data cables, cleaning solution and selfie sticks for cell phones and tablets, which do not carry coverage. cellhelmet made its debut on Kickstarter in January 2012 as the first company to include accidental damage coverage with its protective accessories.

Cellhelmet is owned and operated by Michael Kane and David Eldridge of Pittsburgh, Pennsylvania.

== See also ==
- Made in USA
- Mobile phone accessories
