= Handcycle =

Arm-powered land vehicle

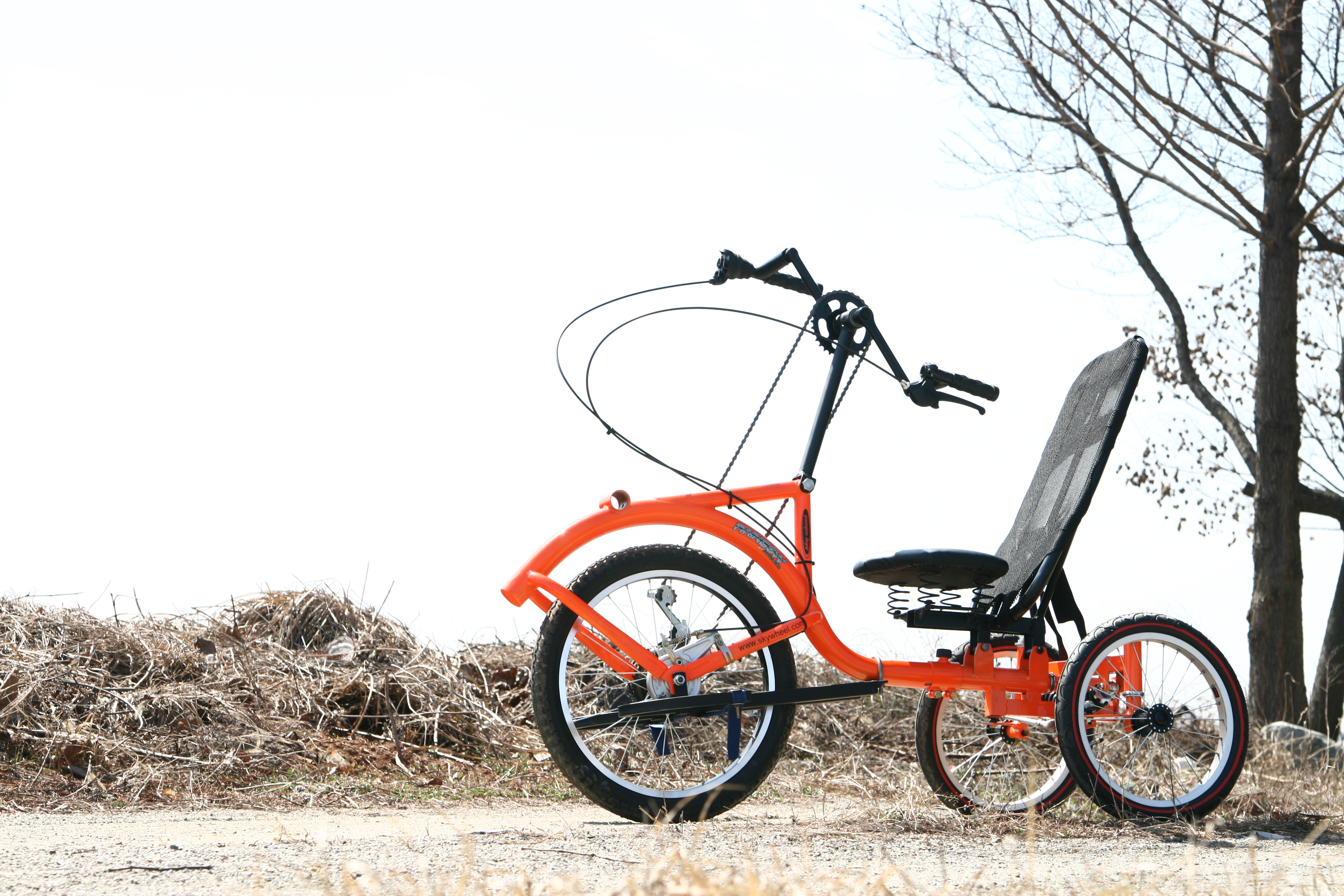
Handcycle with high stance and upright riding position

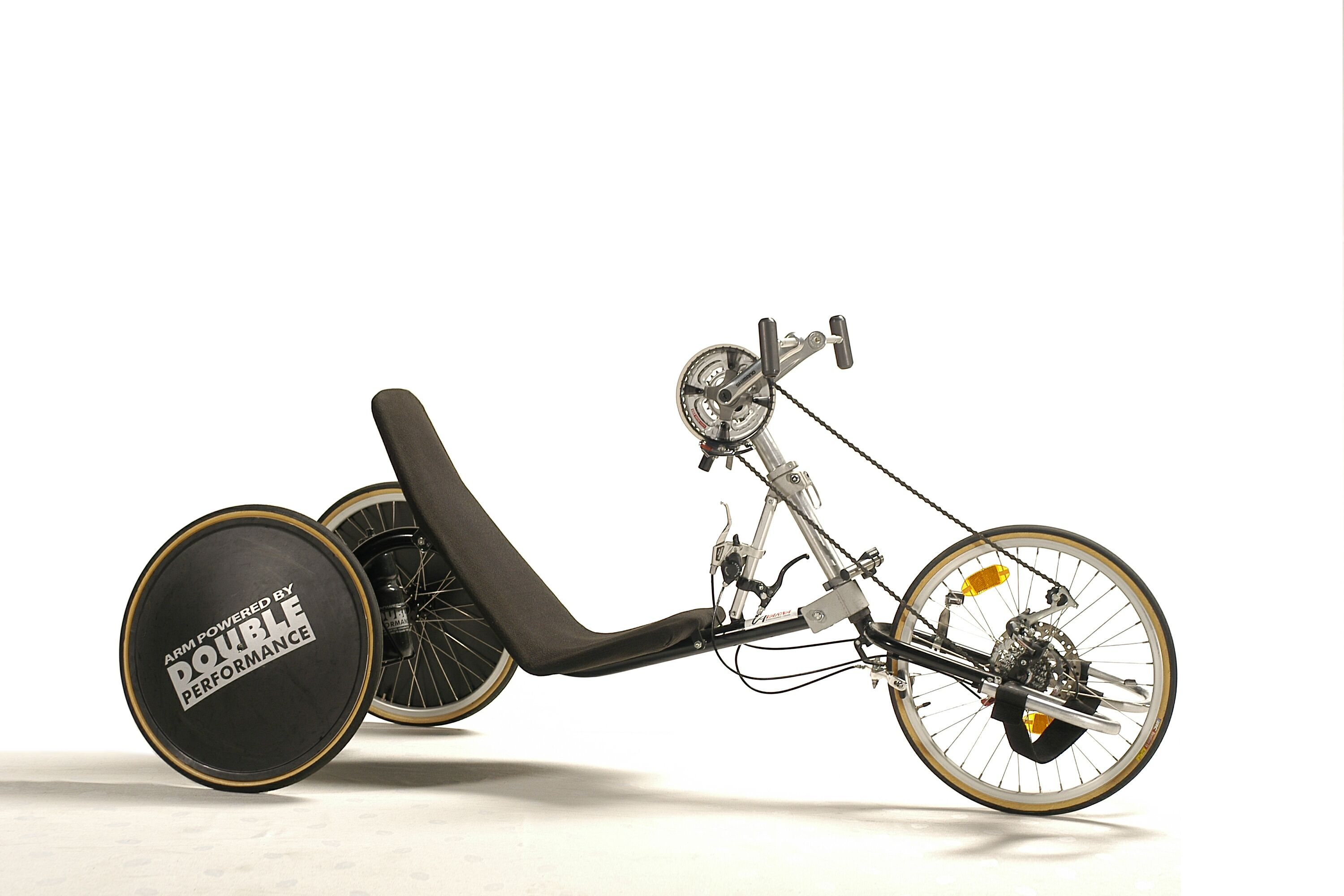
Handcycle with low stance and recumbent riding position

A handcycle is a type of human-powered land vehicle powered by the arms rather than the legs, as on a bicycle. Most handcycles are tricycle in form, with two coasting rear wheels and one steerable powered front wheel. Despite usually having three wheels, they are also known as handbikes.

== History ==
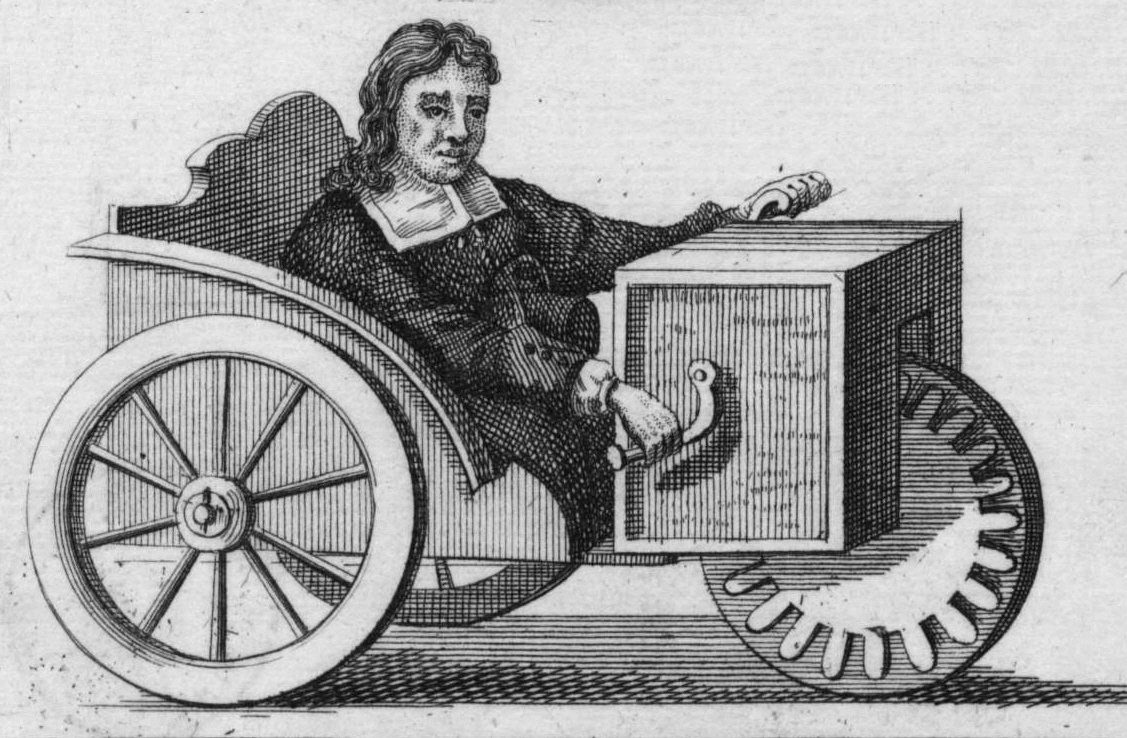
Farffler's carriage of 1655

Stephan Farffler was a Nuremberg watchmaker of the seventeenth century whose invention of a manumotive carriage in 1655 is widely considered to have been the first self-propelled bicycle. He is believed to have been either a paraplegic or an amputee. The three-wheeled device is believed to have been a precursor to the modern-day tricycle and bicycle.

Later innovations in handcycle design would be driven by a need to provide transportation for soldiers injured during the American Civil War, and later, the First World War. While Farffler's carriage emerged from his background as a clockmaker, mid-nineteenth century designs would be produced by mainstream bicycle manufacturers such as The Singer Cycle company of Coventry. By the end of World War I, metal tube handcycles with chain drives became more common to meet the needs of soldiers who lost their legs.

As handcycles have grown in popularity and availability, the needs of a wide array of users have led to handcycle manufacturers innovating on earlier designs. Specialist manufacturers such as Freedom Concepts (whose STRAE Sport handcycle caters to teens and adults with spinal cord injuries) and Theraplay Mobility Cycles (who design cycles for children with spina bifida) build handcycles designed to meet the needs of a specific group of disabled cyclists. High-end racing handcycles are also produced to fit the needs of para-cycling competitors.

== Description ==
Many manufacturers have designed and released hand-powered recumbent trikes, or handcycles. Handcycles are a regular sight at HPV meets and are beginning to be seen on the streets. They commonly follow a delta design with front wheels driven by standard derailleur gearing powered by hand cranks. Brake levers are usually mounted on the handholds which are usually mounted in phase, unlike pedal cranks, which are usually 180° out of phase. This allows the rider to more easily use their torso to help propel the cycle. The entire crank assembly and the front wheel turn together, allowing the rider to steer and crank simultaneously.

Some designs use two front wheels and a single rear wheel, while others use lean-steer designs.

A handcycle is not a wheelchair; a handcycle has a crank and gears, while a wheelchair has push-rims directly on the main wheels.

== Styles ==
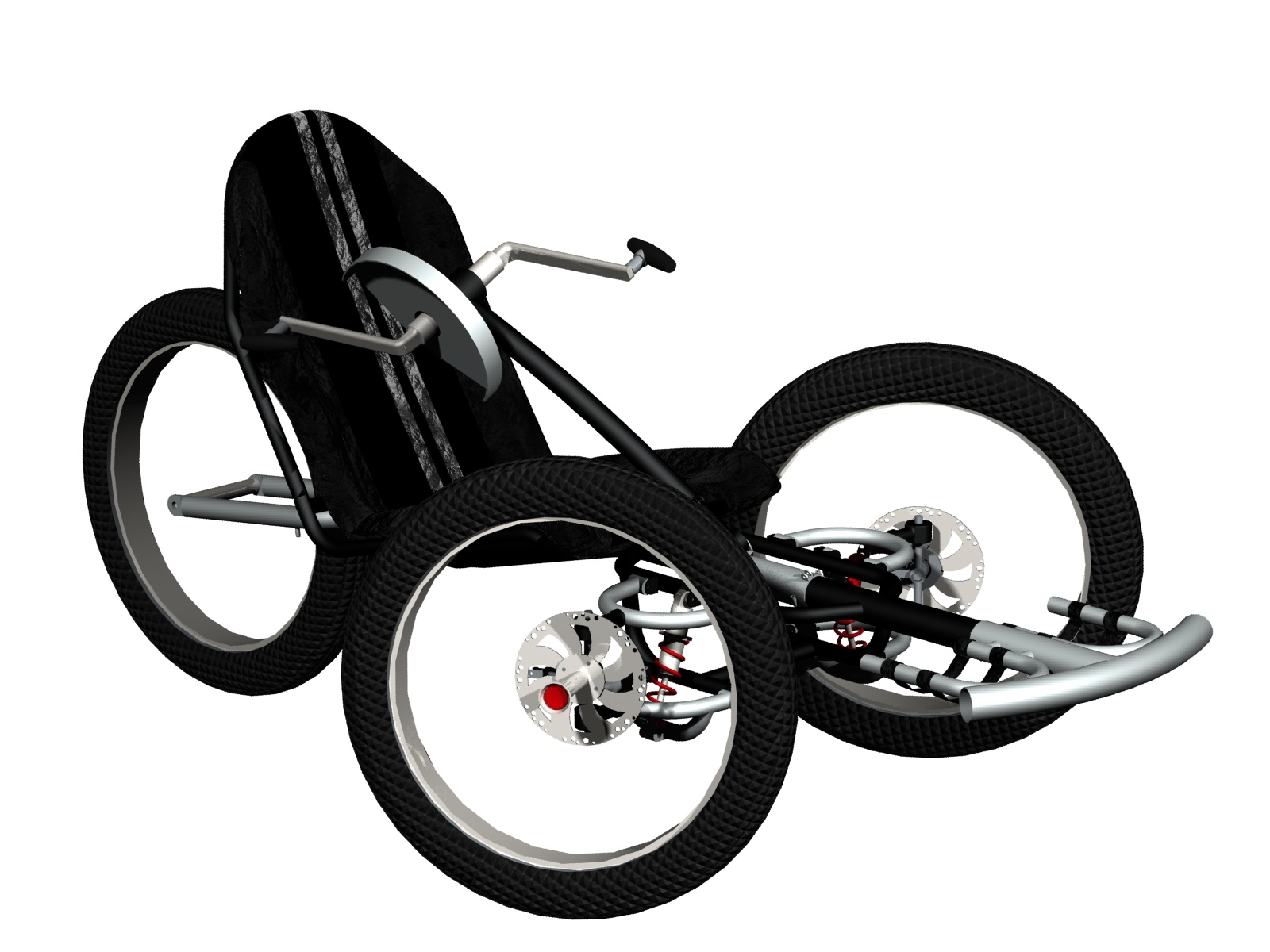
Off-road handcycle

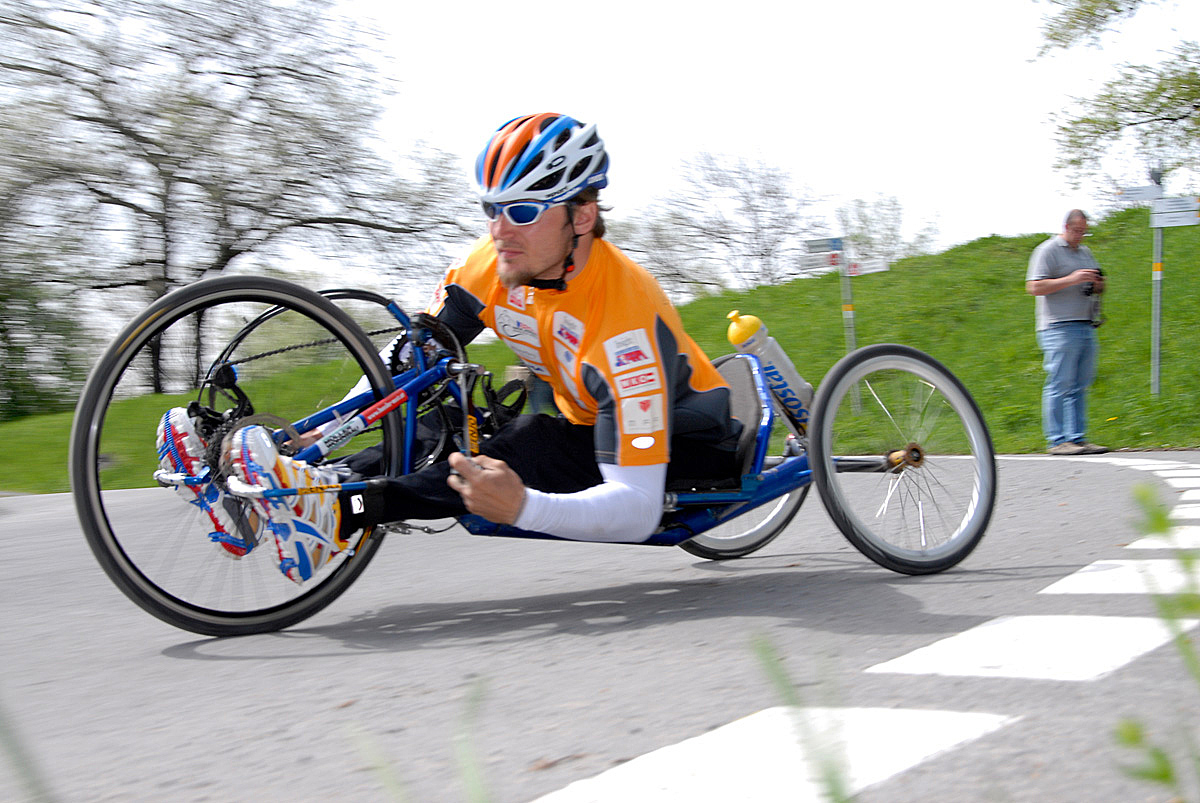
Racing handcycle

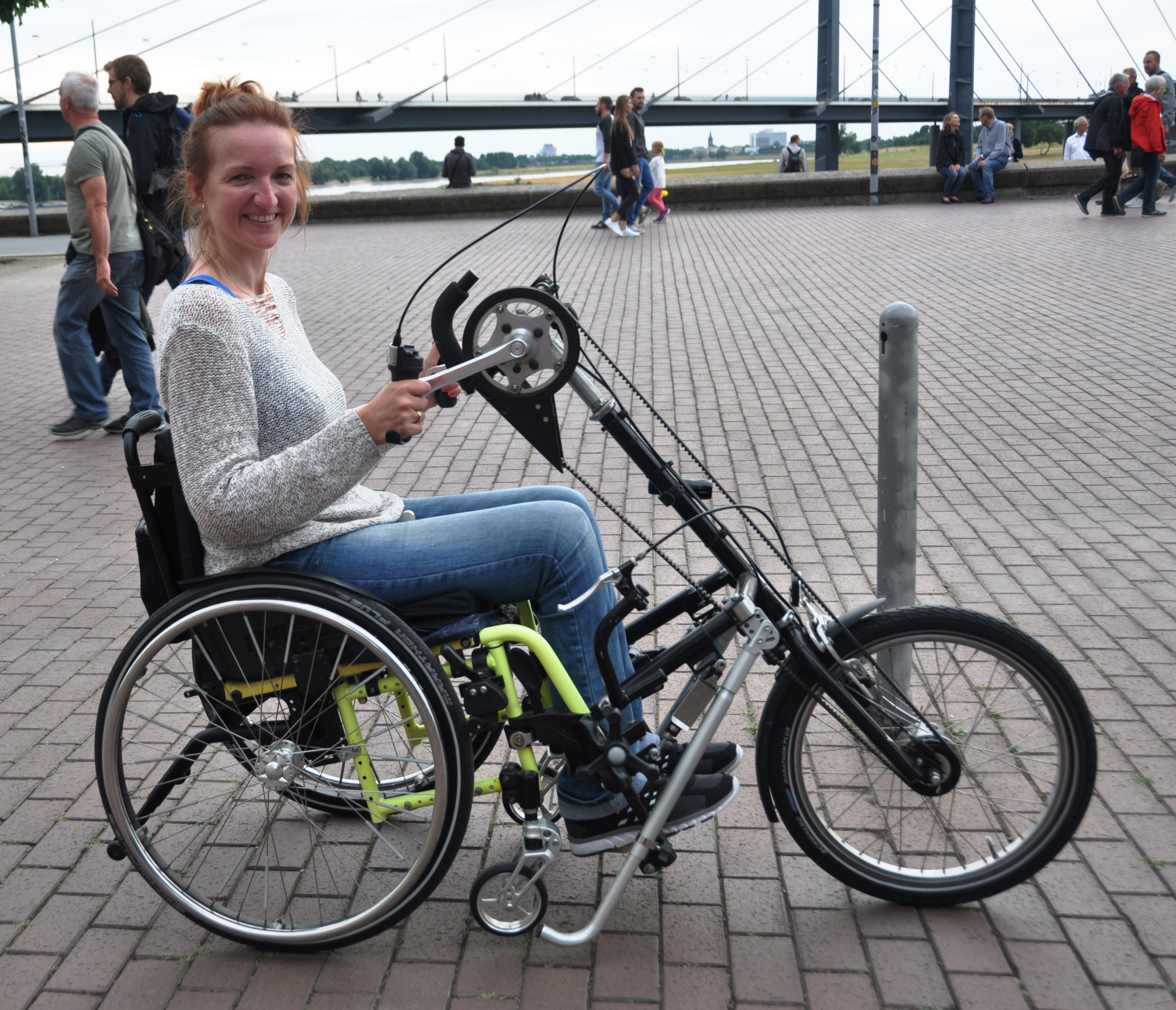
Handcycle add-on/conversion for wheelchair

Handcycles come in a variety of styles, making them accessible to people with a wide variety of disabilities. There are also hybrids between a handcycle, a recumbent bike and a tricycle.

=== Fork steer ===
Fork steer handcycles represent the majority of handcycles sold. They work well for both low and high-level spinal injuries, and most have adjustable footrests, seat angle, and come with a variety of gearing, wheel and tire configurations depending on intended use: racing, recreation, or touring. Manufacturers of this type of handcycle include Invacare (Top End), Intrepid Equipment, Varna, Schmicking and Sunrise Medical (Quickie).

=== Lean steer ===
Riders turn lean steer handcycles by leaning into the turn. There is a longer learning curve with lean steer handcycles and they are significantly less stable at high speed. The lean steer system feels similar to mono skiing: using your whole body to steer the handcycle. Lean steer handcycles can work well for lower-level injuries; although, some athletes with high-level disability use them as well. Manufacturers of this type of handcycle include Lighting Handcycles and Brike International Ltd. (Freedom Ryder).

Another type of lean steer hand trike has two steering rear wheels and one non-steerable, powered front wheel with handholds offset at 180°, similar to pedal cranks, that can be operated with only one hand, thus making it easy to ride uphill, and it can be ridden in a tighter curve with the automatic rear wheels steering system.

=== Off road ===
The off-road is different from other handcycles in that there are two wheels in front and one behind, and it has a lower gear ratio range. This gives the cycle the ability to tackle steep slopes and permits handcycle mountain biking. The addition of a wider tire with suitable tread makes some mountain biking possible on standard road bikes.

=== Touring ===
Handcycles have also been used for touring, and to better accommodate this interest, some manufacturers incorporate mudguards and pannier cargo racks. As handcycles have evolved they have become progressively lighter, and they have better gearing for long climbs and long-distance touring.

=== Racing ===
Racing handcycles tend to be extremely low to the ground to minimize air drag and maximize the lateral acceleration that can be generated in a turn without rolling over to the outside.

=== Wheelchair conversion ===
An attachment, consisting of a steerable front wheel and crank, can convert a wheelchair into a handcycle.

== Gallery ==
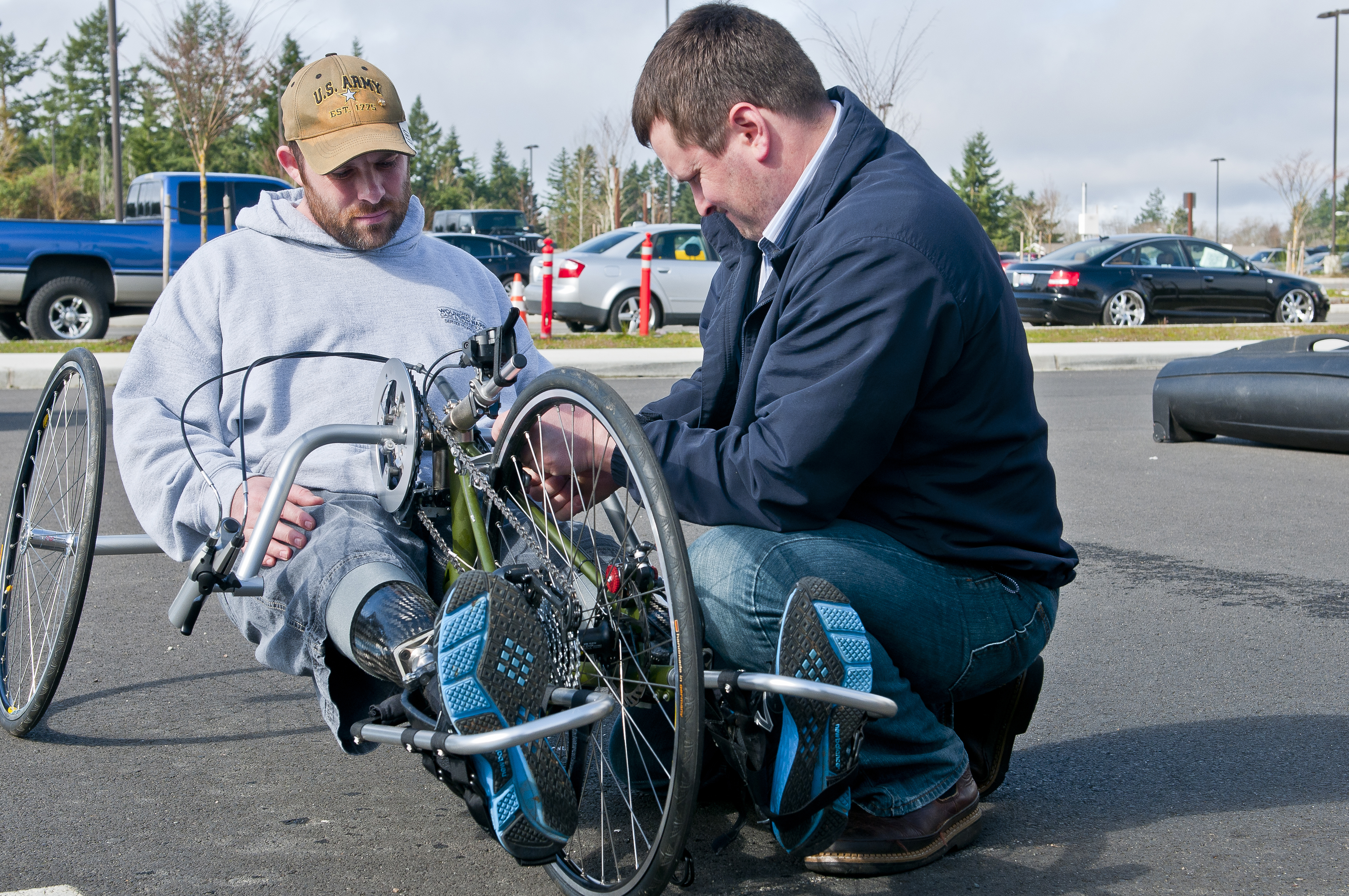
Tricycle handcycle

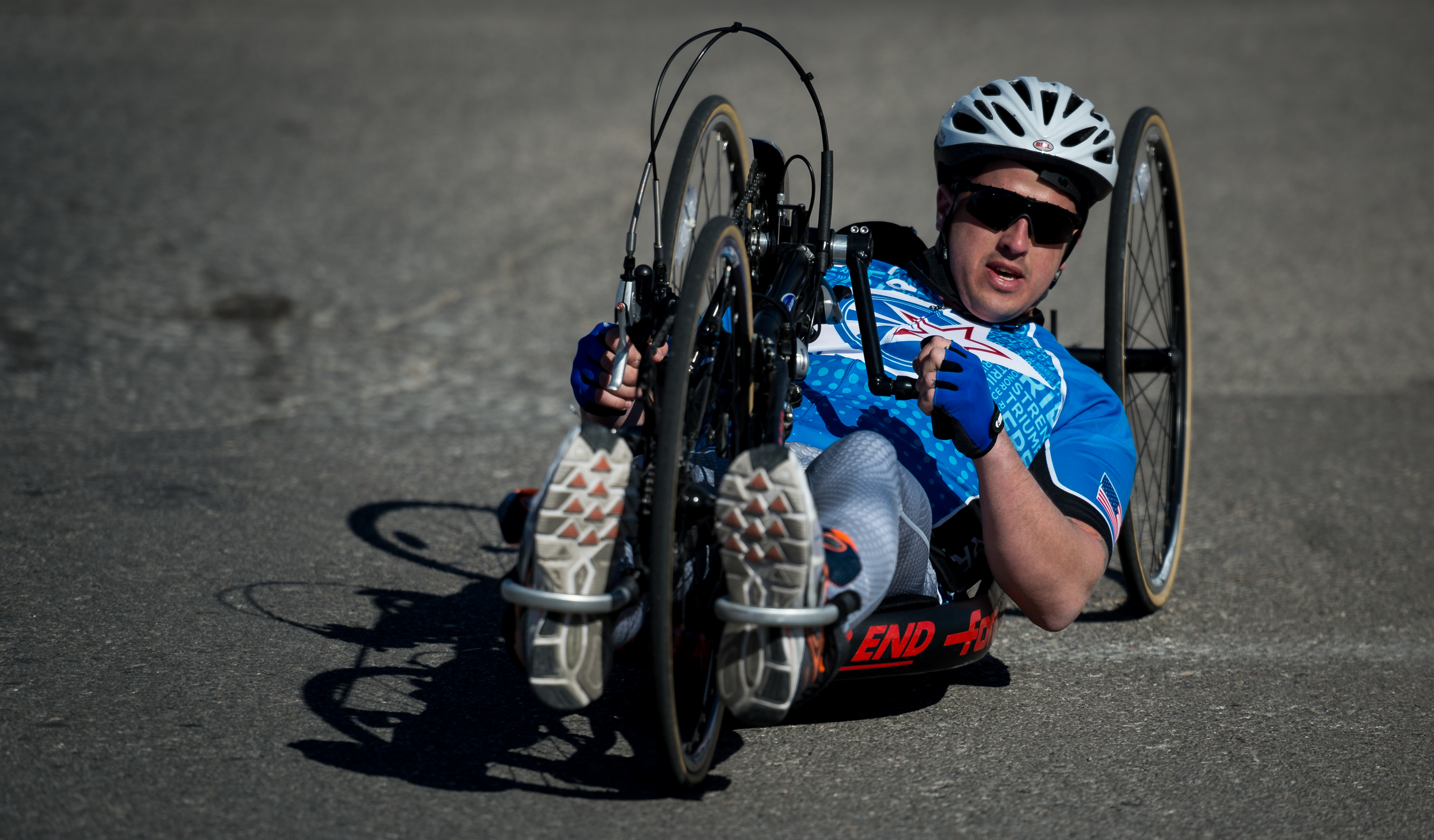
Tricycle handcycle intended for racing

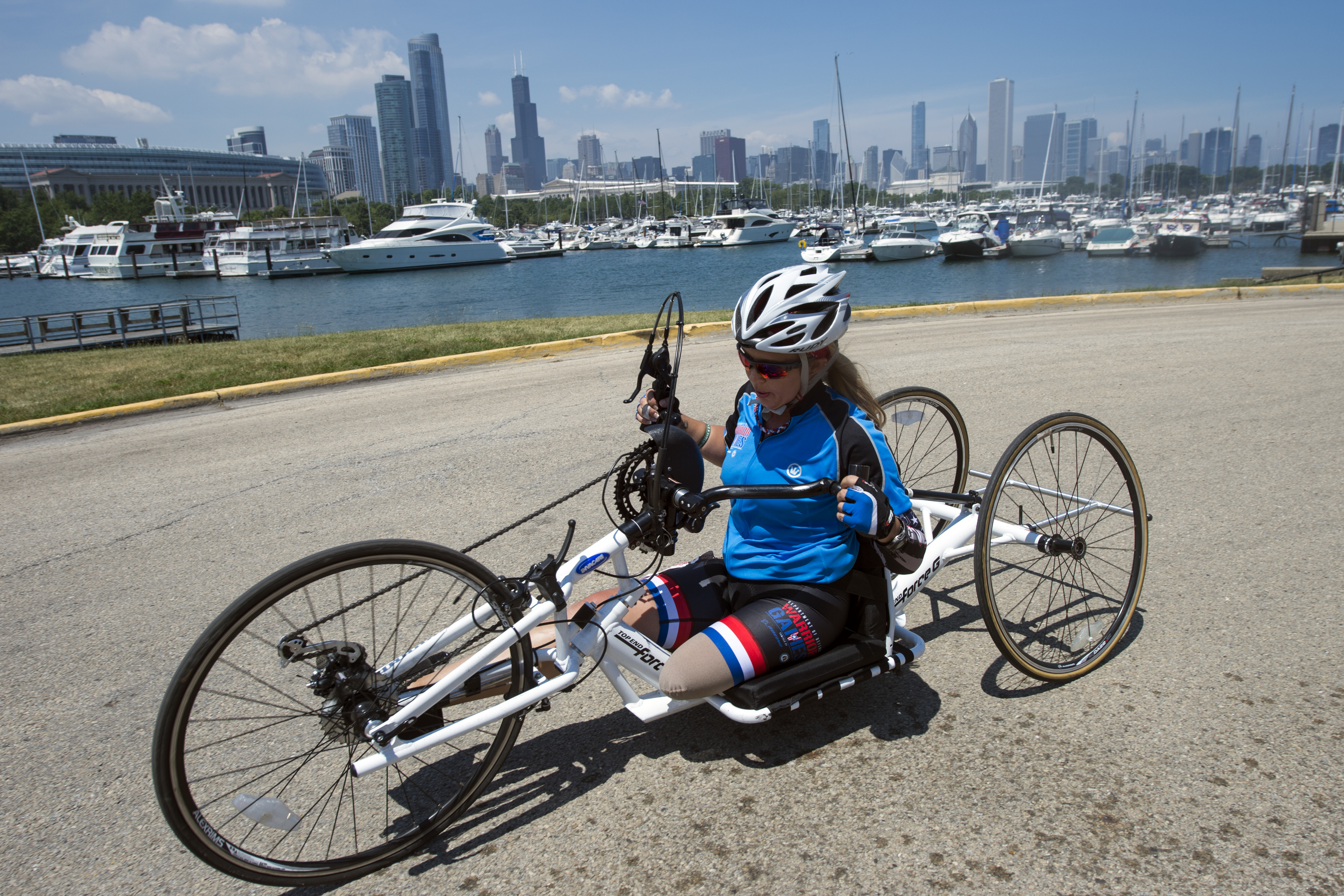
Handcycle racing

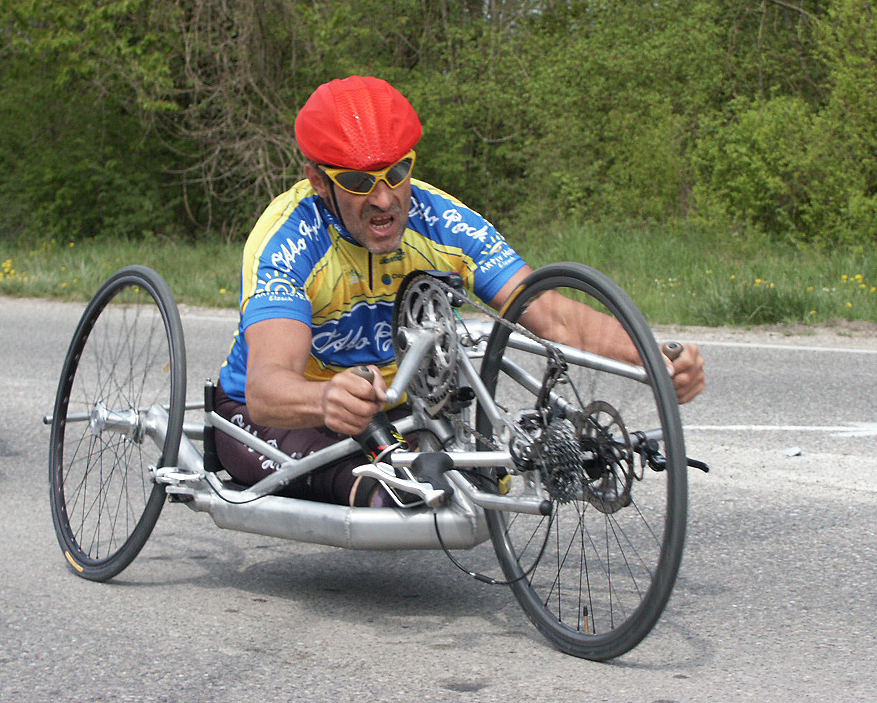
Handcycle racing

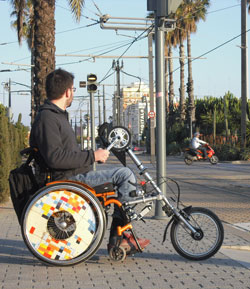
Handbike add-on/conversion for wheelchair

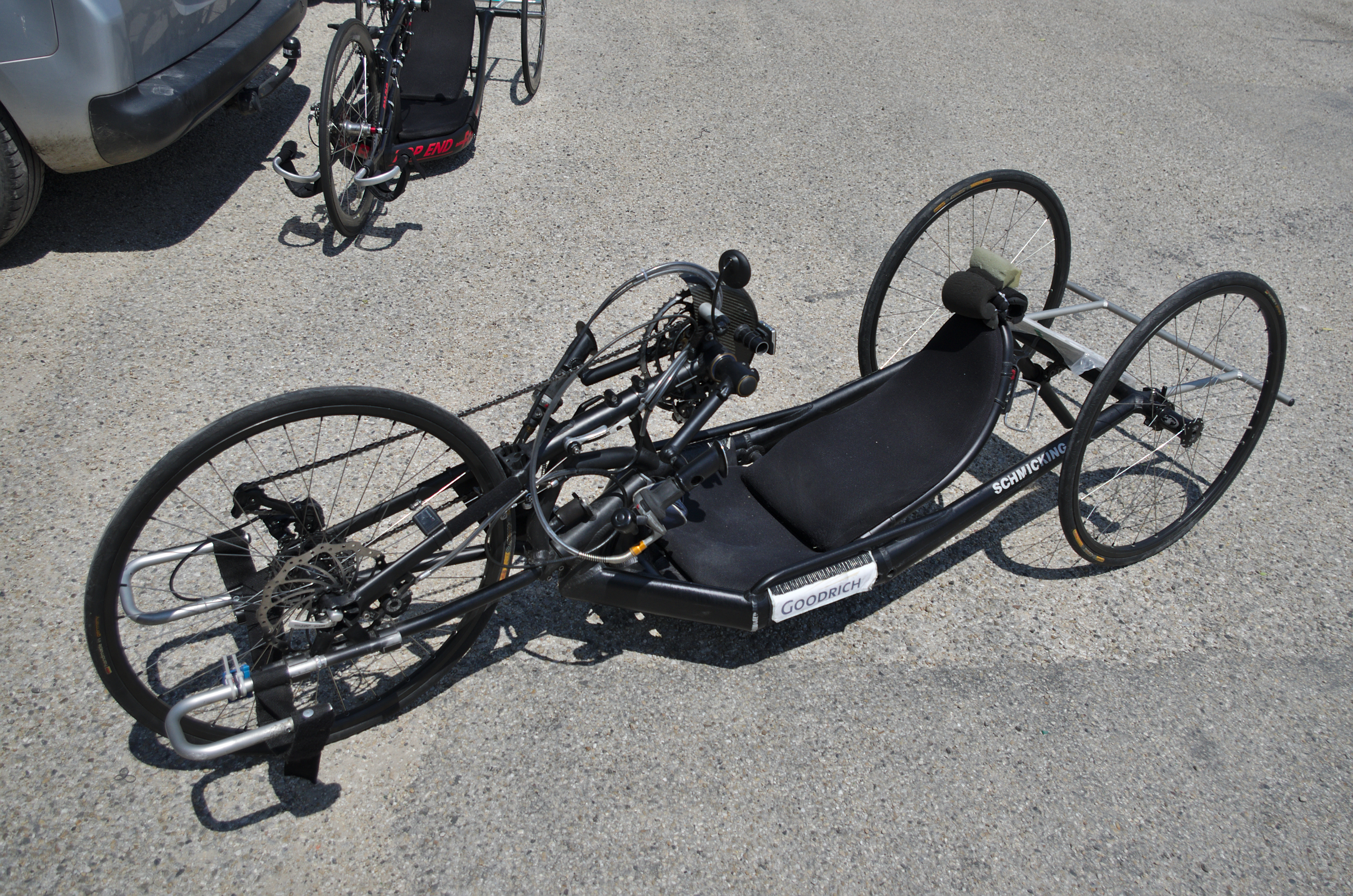
Handcycle without rider

== See also ==
- Cycling at the Summer Paralympics
- Invalid carriage
- Para-cycling
- Outline of cycling
- Quadracycle (human-powered vehicle)
- Racerunning
- Recumbent bicycle
- Rowing cycle
- Tricycle
