= MEMS electrothermal actuator =

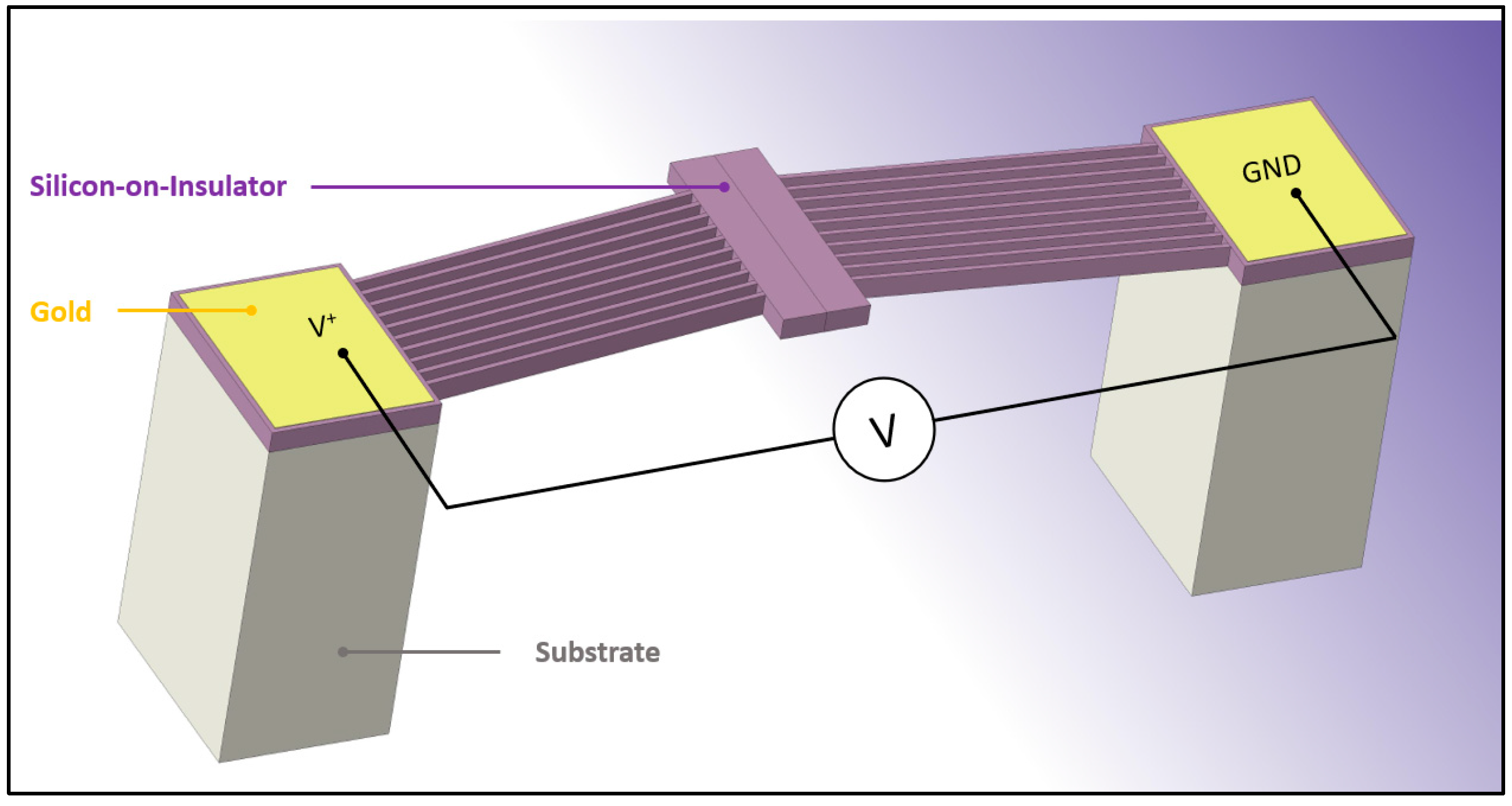
3D view of MEMS electrothermal actuator

A MEMS electrothermal actuator is a microelectromechanical device that typically generates motion by thermal expansion. It relies on the equilibrium between the thermal energy produced by an applied electric current and the heat dissipated into the environment or the substrate. Its working principle is based on resistive heating. Fabrication processes for electrothermal actuators include deep X-ray lithography, LIGA (lithography, electroplating, and molding), and deep reactive ion etching (DRIE). These techniques allow for the creation of devices with high aspect ratios. Additionally, these actuators are relatively easy to fabricate and are compatible with standard Integrated Circuits (IC) and MEMS fabrication methods. These electrothermal actuators can be utilized in different kind of MEMS devices like microgrippers, micromirrors, tunable inductors and resonators.

== Types of MEMS electrothermal actuators ==
Generally, there are three types of MEMS electrothermal actuators. One is asymmetric thermal actuator, also known as hot-and-cold-arm or U-shaped actuator. Its working principle is based on the unequal thermal expansion of its components. The second type of electrothermal actuators is the symmetric thermal actuator, also known as chevron or bent beam actuator. Its operation is based on the total thermal expansion and its output motion is limited to one direction. The third type of MEMS electrothermal actuator is the bimorph actuator. Its motion relies on the varying coefficients of thermal expansion of the materials used in their fabrication.

=== Asymmetric (hot-and-cold-arm actuator, U-Shaped) ===
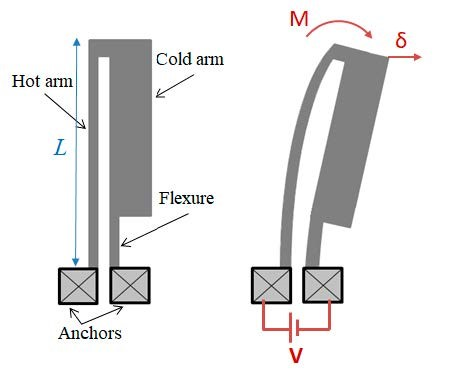
U-shaped hot-and-cold-arm actuator

An asymmetric MEMS electrothermal actuator, often referred to as a bimorph or U-shaped thermal actuator, consists of a narrow "hot" arm and a wider "cold" arm connected in series to an electrical circuit. When current flows through the actuator, Joule heating occurs, producing more heat in the narrow arm due to its higher electrical resistance, resulting in greater thermal expansion compared to the wide arm. This differential thermal expansion creates a bending moment, causing the actuator to bend towards the cold arm. This design allows for precise actuation and is suitable for various MEMS applications, including micro and nano manipulation tools like microgrippers and micro positioners. These tools are essential for tasks such as micro assembly, biological cell manipulation, and material characterization, offering advantages such as low driving voltages and easy control. Various microgripper designs have been developed to enhance performance, including different arm widths and lengths, electro-thermo-compliant actuators, three-beam actuators, folded and meander heaters, sandwiched structures, inclined arms, and curved hot arms. These actuators are used in applications requiring precise control of temperature and force, such as handling fragile micro-particles and single-cell manipulation. Additionally, they are employed in switching mechanisms, optical devices, and bi-directional actuators for applications like RF MEMS switches and micro-positioning platforms, providing larger displacement ranges and improved functionality.

=== Symmetric (Chevron, bent beam) ===
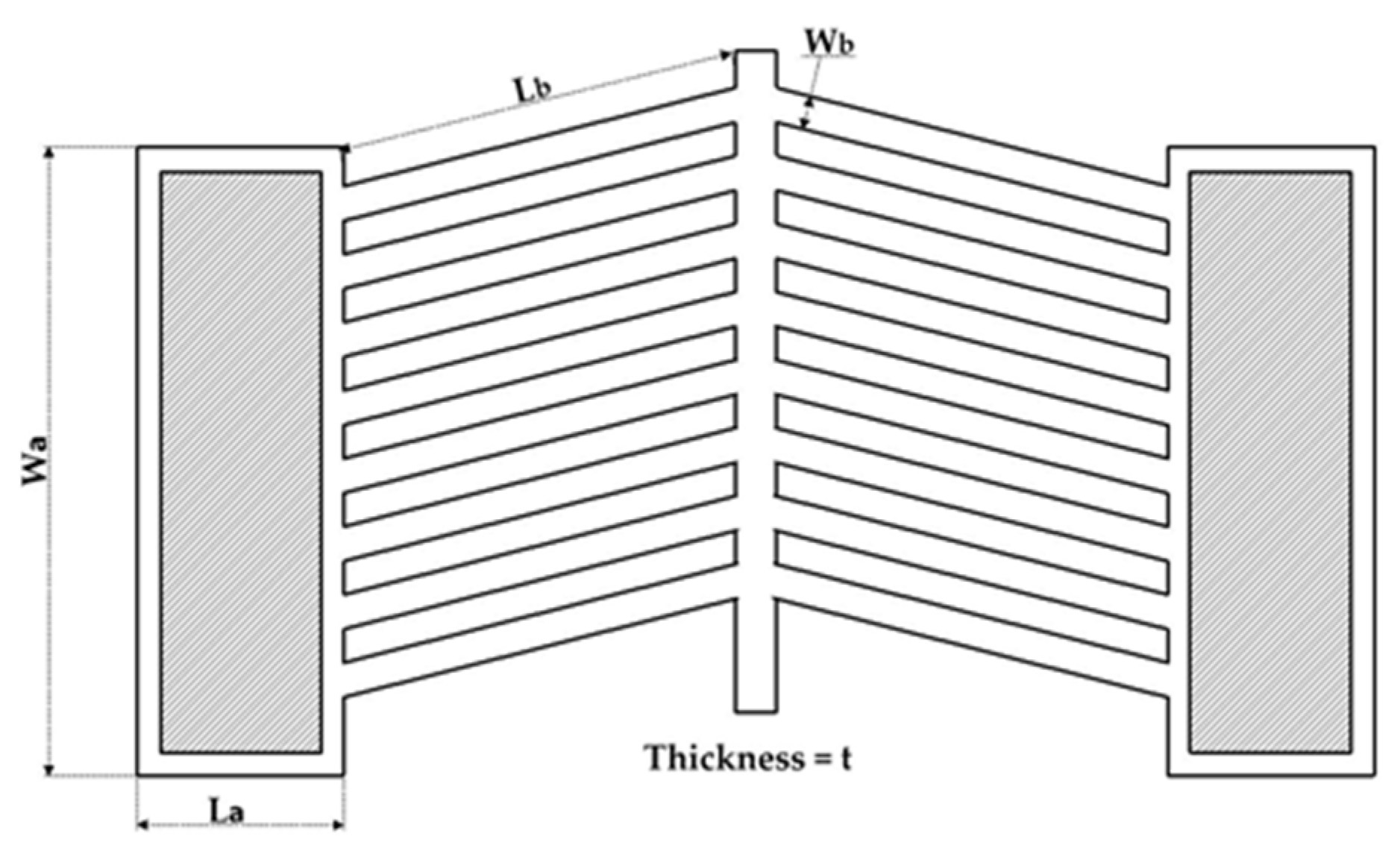
Schematic of chevron electrothermal actuator with eight pairs of beams

The symmetric or Chevron actuator, also known as the V-shape or bent-beam actuator, is a widely used in-plane electrothermal actuator. It features a V-shaped design but can also be found in other shapes. Unlike the differential expansion in hot-and-cold-arm actuators, the Chevron actuator relies on the total thermal expansion for actuation. It consists of two equal slanted beams connected at an apex and anchored to the substrate, forming a single conduction path. When current passes through the beams, resistive heating causes thermal expansion, pushing the apex forward. A comprehensive deflection model for this actuator involves solving a transcendental function numerically to determine the tip displacement, influenced by factors like beam length, pre-bending angle, and temperature increase. The critical parameters include the beam length, pre-bending angle, and thickness. Smaller inclination angles yield larger displacements but risk out-of-plane buckling and fabrication issues. The stiffness and output force can be increased by stacking multiple beams. Chevron actuators are versatile, being used in MEMS applications like micro-switches, microgrippers, and material characterization tools. They can produce substantial gripping force but with limited lateral displacement. To amplify displacement, mechanical amplifiers are often used. Applications include pick-and-place operations for nanomaterials, biological cell manipulation, and RF MEMS switches, where the actuator's stability and high force are advantageous. Variants like Z-shape and kink actuators offer alternative designs for specific needs, such as larger displacement or easier fabrication. Cascaded Chevron actuators enhance displacement further by connecting multiple stages, albeit with increased buckling risk. Applications include micro-engines and advanced microgrippers. These actuators provide significant advantages over other types due to their rectilinear motion, high output force, and low driving voltage, making them suitable for a wide range of precise, small-scale tasks.

=== Bimorph ===
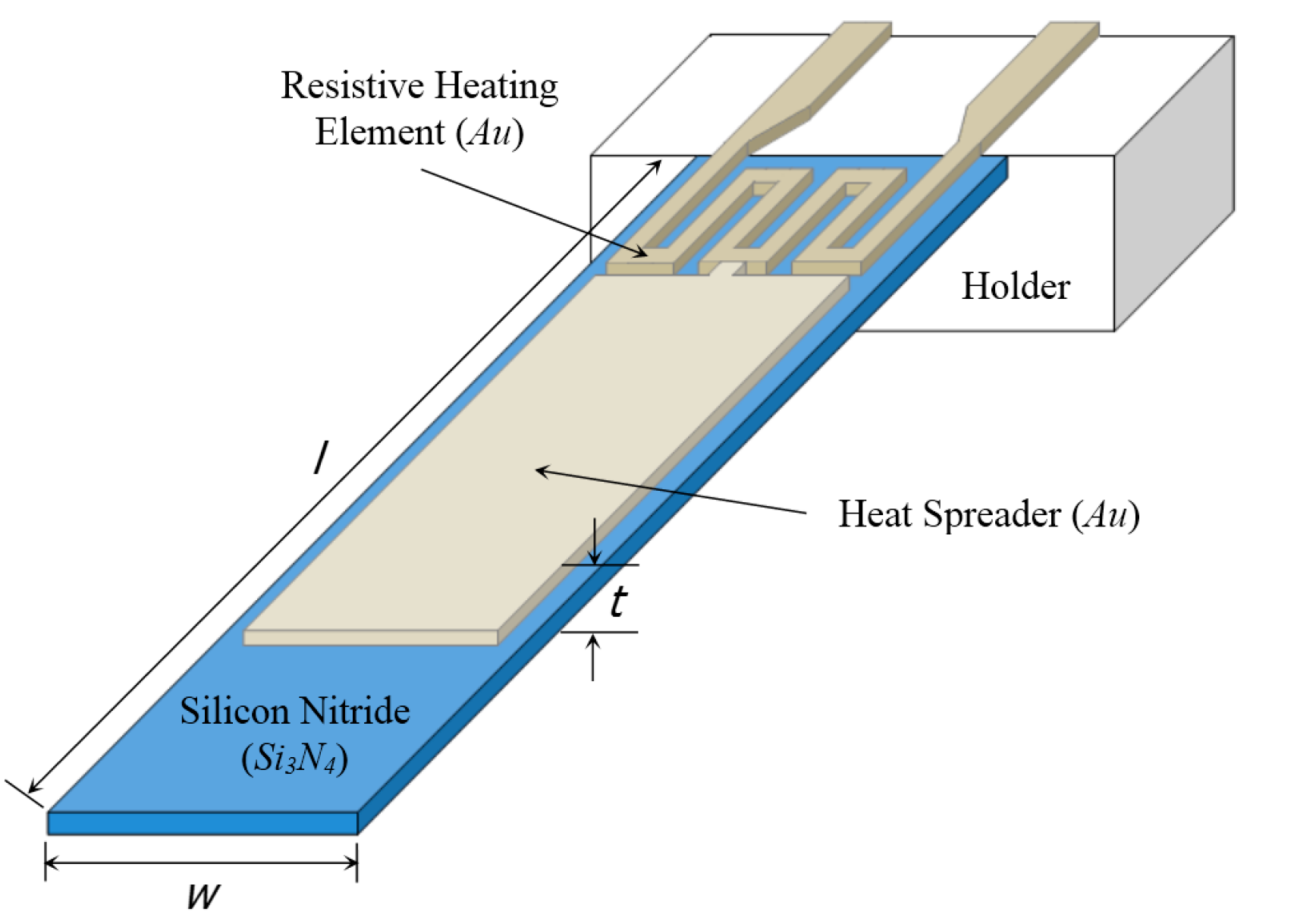
Bimorph microcantilever actuator

The bimorph design is a prominent type of electrothermal actuator consisting of two or more layers of different materials with varied coefficients of thermal expansion (CTE). When subjected to thermal stimuli, the differential expansion causes the actuator to bend, producing out-of-plane displacement. This makes bimorph actuators ideal for applications where in-plane actuators are unsuitable, offering a broad range of applications. The deflection mechanism relies on material properties, such as Young's modulus and CTE mismatch, as well as the thickness ratio of the layers and the beam's geometrical parameters. A basic bimorph cantilever consists of two layers: one with a high CTE and another with a low CTE. Joule heating induces more expansion in the high-CTE layer, causing the structure to bend towards the low-CTE layer. The theoretical models for the behavior of bimorph actuators, such as tip deflection and output force, are well-established. For a simple two-layer cantilever, the curvature due to thermal expansion mismatch can be calculated using specific formulas involving temperature change, CTE, width, thickness, and Young's modulus of each layer. The choice of materials for bimorph actuators is diverse, with metals and polymers commonly used for high-CTE layers, and dielectrics or semiconductors for low-CTE layers. Recent advancements include the use of carbon materials like graphene, which has a negative CTE, and graphene/polymer composites.

Bimorph actuators are typically designed for out-of-plane actuation due to the planar deposition of layers, innovative designs such as the "vertical bimorph" and lateral actuators have been developed to achieve in-plane actuation using techniques like angled electron-beam evaporation and post-CMOS micromachining. Bimorph actuators find applications in various fields. In micromanipulation, conventional bimorph actuators are less feasible for in-plane microgrippers, but novel designs like a four-finger microgripper provide stable and reliable gripping by curling upwards when open. In micromirrors, bimorph actuators enable large displacement with low power consumption, ideal for tilting and piston motion in applications like projection displays, optical switches, barcode readers, biomedical imaging, tunable lasers, spectroscopy, and adaptive optics. They are also used in atomic force microscopy (AFM) and scanning probe nanolithography (SPN), offering nanometer-scale resolution imaging and efficient patterning. Additionally, bimorph actuators are utilized in tunable RF devices due to their precise control and actuation capabilities. However, challenges such as shear stress at layer interfaces must be managed to ensure the longevity of bimorph devices.

== Advantages ==
Electrothermal actuators offer several advantages over other types of actuators, making them valuable components for MEMS. They operate with relatively low driving voltages yet can generate large forces and displacements, either parallel or perpendicular to the substrate. Unlike actuators that rely on electrostatic or magnetic fields, electrothermal actuators are suitable for manipulating biological samples and electronic chips. These actuators are also easy to control, as they do not exhibit significant hysteresis like piezoresistive and shape memory alloy (SMA) actuators. Electrothermal actuators are scalable in size and typically have a more compact structure compared to electrostatic actuators, which use large arrays of comb drives, or electromagnetic and SMA actuators, which are challenging to implement on a small scale. They are versatile in their operating environments, functioning well in air, vacuum, dusty conditions, liquid media, and under the electron beam in scanning electron microscopy (SEM). However, electrothermal actuators generally have low switching speeds due to the large time constants of thermal processes. Despite this, high-frequency thermal actuation has been demonstrated. The method of electrothermal excitation is also attractive for actuation in resonance mode, particularly for microcantilever-based sensing and probing applications. MEMS resonators using this method have shown high-quality factors and wide frequency tuning ranges.

== Other types of MEMS Actuators ==
- Electrostatic — parallel plate or comb drive
- Piezoelectric
- Magnetic
- Thermostatic — linear motion, paraffin wax drive

== See also ==
- MEMS magnetic actuator
- MEMS electrostatic actuator
