= Microscanner =

A microscanner, or micro scanning mirror, is a microoptoelectromechanical system (MOEMS) in the category of micromirror actuators for dynamic light modulation. Depending upon the type of microscanner, the modulatory movement of a single mirror can be either translatory or rotational, on one or two axes. In the first case, a phase shifting effect takes place. In the second case, the incident light wave is deflected.

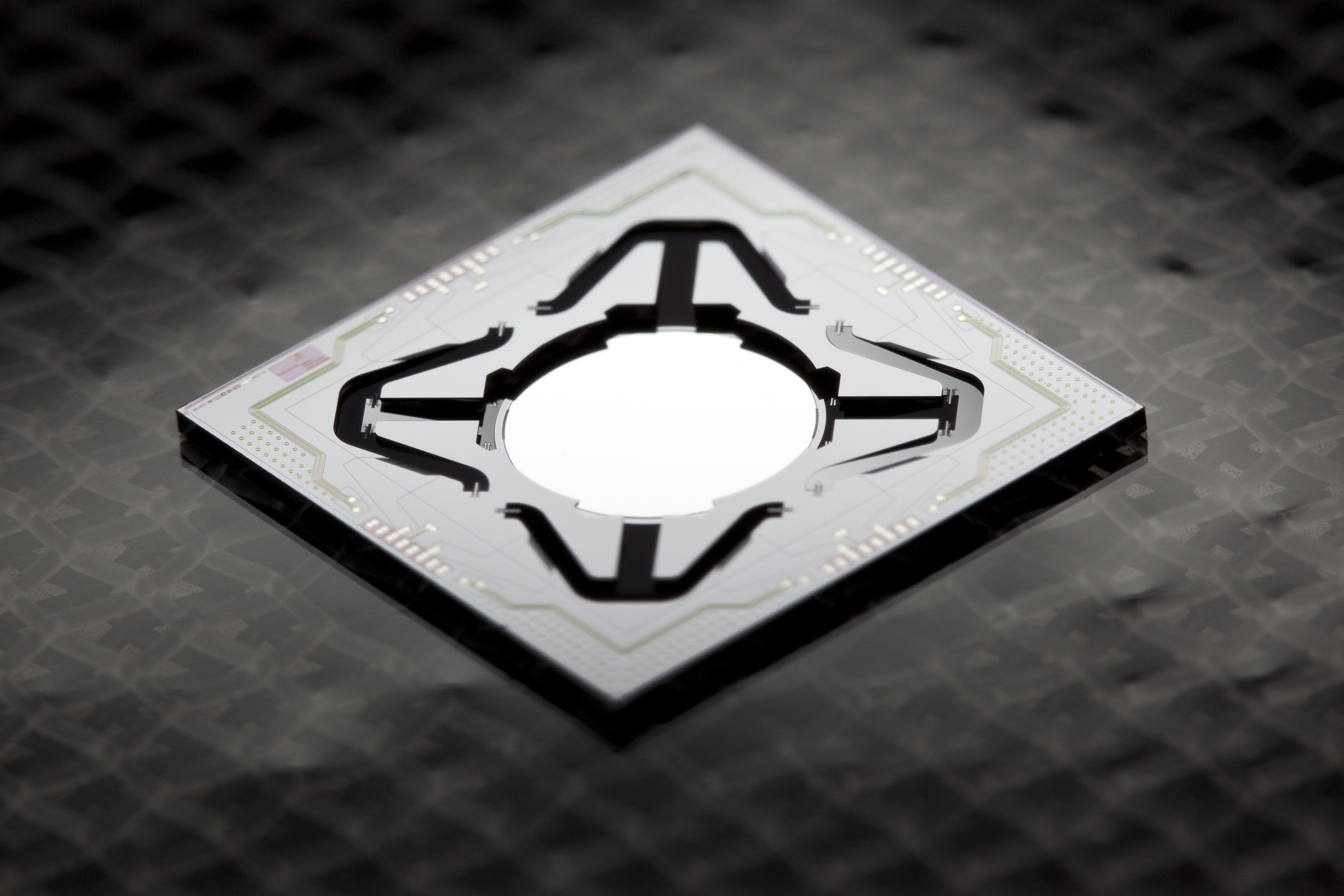
Resonant translational mirror in pantograph design with a deflection of ±500 μm

Microscanners are different from spatial light modulators and other micromirror actuators which need a matrix of individually addressable mirrors in order to accomplish the desired modulation at any yield. If a single array mirror accomplishes the desired modulation but is operated in parallel with other array mirrors to increase light yield, then the term microscanner array is used.

== Characteristics ==
Common chip dimensions are 4 mm × 5 mm for mirror diameters between 1 and 3 mm. Larger mirror apertures with side measurements of up to approx. 10 mm × 3 mm can also be produced. The scan frequencies depend upon the design and mirror size and range between 0.1 and 50 kHz. The deflection movement is either resonant or quasi-static. With microscanners that are capable of tilting movement, light can be directed over a projection plane.

Many applications requires that a surface is addressed instead of only a single line. For these applications, actuation using a Lissajous pattern can accomplish sinusoidal scan motion, or double resonant operation. Mechanical deflection angles of micro scanning devices reach up to ±30°. Translational (piston type) microscanners, can attain a mechanical stroke of up to approx. ±500 μm. This configuration is energy efficient, but requires complicated control electronics. For high end display applications the common choice is raster scanning, where a resonant scanner (for the longer display dimension) is paired with quasi-static scanner (for the shorter dimension).

== Drive principles ==
The required drive forces for the mirror movement can be provided by various physical principles. In practice, the relevant principles for driving such a mirror are the electromagnetic, electrostatic, thermoelectric, and piezoelectric effects. Because the physical principles differ in their advantages and disadvantages, the driving principle is chosen according to the application. Specifically, the mechanical solutions required for resonant scanning are very different for those of quasi-static scanning. Thermoelectric actuators are not applicable for high-frequency resonant scanners, but the other three principles can be applied to the full spectrum of applications.

For resonant scanners, one often employed configuration is the indirect drive. In an indirect drive, a small motion in a larger mass is coupled to a large motion in a smaller mass (the mirror) through mechanical amplification at a favorable mode shape. This is in contrast to the more common direct drive, where the actuator mechanism moves the mirror directly. Indirect drives have been implemented for electromagnetic, electrostatic, as well as piezoelectric actuators. Existing piezoelectric scanners are more efficient using direct drive.

Electrostatic actuators offer high power similar to electromagnetic drives. In contrast to an electromagnetic drive, the resulting drive force between the drive structures cannot be reversed in polarity. For the realization of quasi-static components with positive and negative effective direction, two drives with positive and negative polarity are required. As a rule of thumb, vertical comb drives are utilized here. Nevertheless, the highly non-linear drive characteristics in some parts of the deflection area can be hindering for controlling the mirror properly. For that reason many highly developed microscanners today utilize a resonant mode of operation, where an eigenmode is activated. Resonant operation is the most energy-efficient. For beam positioning and applications which are to be static-actuated or linearized-scanned, quasi-static drives are required and therefore of great interest.

Magnetic actuators offer very good linearity of the tilt angle versus the applied signal amplitude, both in static and dynamic operation. The working principle is that a metallic coil is placed on the moving MEMS mirror itself and as the mirror is placed in a magnetic field, the alternating current flowing in the coil generates Lorentz force that tilts the mirror. Magnetic actuation can either be used for actuating 1D or 2D MEMS mirrors. Another characteristic of the magnetically actuated MEMS mirror is the fact that low voltage is required (below 5V) making this actuation compatible with standard CMOS voltage. An advantage of such an actuation type is that MEMS behaviour does not present hysteresis, as opposed to electrostatic actuated MEMS mirrors, which make it very simple to control. Power consumption of magnetically actuated MEMS mirrors can be as low as 0.04 mW.

Thermoelectric drives produce high driving forces, but they present a few technical drawbacks inherent to their fundamental principle. The actuator has to be thermally well insulated from the environment, as well as being preheated in order to prevent thermal drift due to environmental influences. That is why the necessary heat output and power consumption for a thermal bimorph actuator is relatively high. One further disadvantage is the comparably low displacement which needs to be leveraged to reach usable mechanical deflections. Also thermal actuators are not suitable for high frequency operation due to significant low pass behaviour.

Piezoelectric drives produce high force, but as with electrothermal actuators the stroke length is short. Piezoelectric drives are, however, less susceptible to thermal environmental influences and can also transmit high-frequency drive signals well. To achieve the desired angle some mechanism utilizing mechanical amplification will be required for most applications. This has proven to be difficult for quasi-static scanners, although there are promising approaches in the literature using long meandering flexures for deflection amplification. For resonant rotational scanners, on the other hand, scanners using piezoelectric actuation combined with an indirect drive are the highest performer in terms of scan angle and working frequency. However, the technology is newer than electrostatic and electromagnetic drives and remains to be implemented in commercial products.

== Fields of Application ==
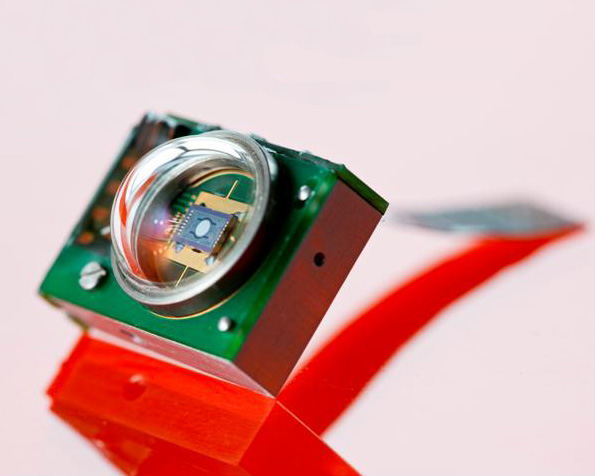
LDC module with 1D microscanner and integrated optical position sensor on the back side

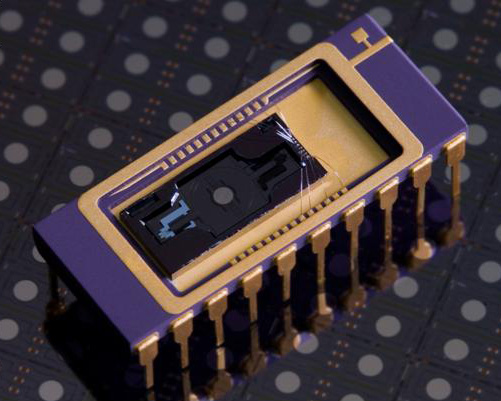
An electrostatic 2D microscanner in a DIL20 casing

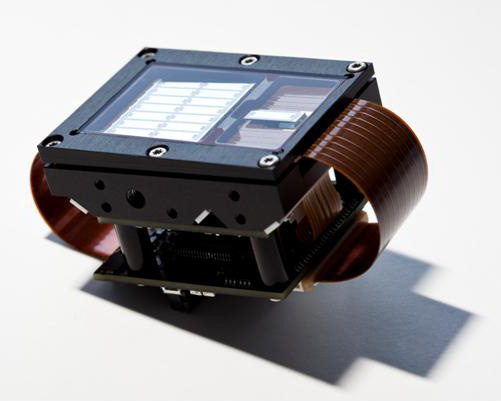
MEMS scanner module for 3D distance measurement (LIDAR) with a single sending mirror (mirror dimensions approx. (9.5 × 2.5 mm)) and a synchronized microscanner array (2 × 7) as receiver unit.

Applications for tilting microscanners are numerous and include:

- Projection displays
- Image recording, e.g. for technical and medical endoscopes
- Bar code scanning
- Spectroscopy
- Laser marking and material processing
- Object measurement / triangulation
- 3D cameras
- Object recognition
- 1D and 2D light grid
- Confocal microscopy / OCT
- Fluorescence microscopy
- Laser wavelength modulation

Some of the applications for piston type microscanners are:

- Fourier transform infrared spectrometer
- Confocal microscopy
- Focus variation

== Manufacture ==
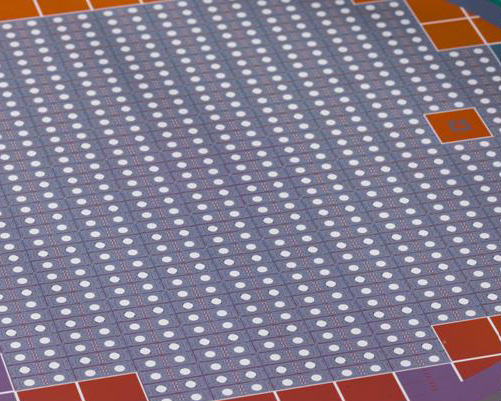
Wafer with resonant microscanners, ready-processed with the Fraunhofer AME75 process (based on blank BSOI wafers), before dicing the devices.

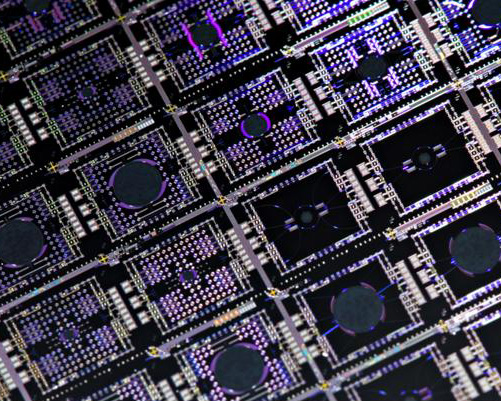
Detail of a wafer with VarioS microscanners, developed and produced based on a modular fabrication system at Fraunhofer IPMS.

Microscanners are usually manufactured with surface or bulk micromechanic processes. As a rule, silicon or BSOI (bonded silicon on insulator) are used.

== Advantages and disadvantages of microscanners ==
Microscanners are smaller, lower mass, and consume smaller amounts of power compared to macroscopic light modulators such as galvanometer scanners. Additionally, microscanners can be integrated with other electronic components such as position sensors. Microscanners are resistant to environmental influences, and can tolerate humidity, dust, physical shocks in some models up to 2500g, and can operate in temperatures from -20 °C to +80 °C.

With current manufacturing technology microscanners can suffer from high costs and long lead times to delivery. This is an active area of process improvement
