= Projection micro-stereolithography =

Use of 3D printing for micro-fabrication

Projection micro-stereolithography (PμSL) adapts 3D printing technology for micro-fabrication. Digital micro display technology provides dynamic stereolithography masks that work as a virtual photomask. This technique allows for rapid photopolymerization of an entire layer with a flash of UV illumination at micro-scale resolution. The mask can control individual pixel light intensity, allowing control of material properties of the fabricated structure with desired spatial distribution.

Materials include polymers, responsive hydrogels, shape memory polymers and bio-materials.

== Introduction ==
The micro electro-mechanical systems (MEMS) is developing quickly in the past 30 years. Relying on the integration of sensors and actuators, MEMS always demand cheaper, easier and more precise method to fabricate micro size 3-D structures using different materials such as polymers, ceramics and semiconductor materials. The appearance of the Projection Micro-stereolithography improves the development of MEMS by achieving most of the requirements above. This invention is based on the stereolithography (3D printing), which developed by Charles Hull in 1984. This machine is primarily used to fabricate soft materials such as hydro gels and polymers. The basic theory behind this invention is using UV light to cure the solution, which consists initiators, monomers and absorbers, to form each layer of materials. Under the exposure of UV light, the initiators are transferred into the radicals. Radicals connect monomers together to begin the polymerization process. The absorbers are mixed with monomers to control the depth of UV light penetration. This chemical process allows the areas under UV exposure to become solid state polymers.

== History ==
At first, all micro size stereolithography method utilized the same method as the macro size stereolithography that they direct write materials on the base. The first micro size stereolithography that use the UV light to cure the liquid resin surface is developed by professor Ikuta and Hirowatari in 1993. This fabrication approach is the prototype of today's projection micro-stereolithography. Compared with previous direct writing fabrication methods, this approach has the advantage that it can fabricate each layer simultaneously which increases the yield rate for large production. At that time, 2D shape data was obtained in a CAD system. The 2D data is used to fabricate 2D sliced planes in the liquid. Therefore, several 2D planes have to be made in the CAD system for complicated structures. This stereolithography can be used to fabricate both polymers and metals. Metals are fabricated using the casting process after a polymer mold is made. Although improves the yield rate, this method requires a mask for each layer of the final product, which increases process time and cost. Therefore, the fabricate technology is developed again that the masks are replaced by the micromirror display device, which is similar to the projector in our daily life. The micromirror display provides a dynamic mask that can change the patterns electronically. Since multiple masks are displaced by one mask, the processing time and fabrication cost are greatly decrease.

== Process ==
The dynamic mask defines the beam. The beam is focused on the surface of a UV-curable polymer resin through a projection lens that reduces the image to the desired size. Once a layer is polymerized, the stage drops the substrate by a predefined layer thickness, and the dynamic mask displays the image for the next layer on top of the preceding one. This proceeds iteratively until complete. The process can create layer thickness on the order of 400 nm.

Sub 2 μm horizontal and sub-1 μm vertical resolutions have been achieved, with sub-1 μm feature sizes. Process can work at ambient temperature and atmosphere, although increased nitrogen improves polymerization Production rates of 4 cu mm/hr have been achieved, depending on resin viscosity.

Materials can be easily switched during fabrication, enabling integration of multiple material elements in a single process.

== Applications ==
Applications include fabricating microactuators, creating molds, electroplating or (with resin additives) ceramic items, including micro-bio reactors to support tissue growth, micromatrices for drug delivery and detection and biochemical integrated circuits to simulate biological systems.

=== Microactuator ===
Inspired by Mimosa pudica, the leaf of this actuator can swell upon the external stimulations such as solvents, temperature and light. In order to control the motion of this actuator, microfluidic channels are embedded inside the leaf of this actuator. With both complex external geometries and internal structures, this soft microactuator can be fabricated using Projection Micro-stereolithography, which is one of the easiest ways to obtain this complex 3D structures. The CAD mold of this actuator is generated in a computer. The sliced 2D images are obtained next. Each 2D image is then projected by the micromirror display and go through the lens to a desired size to the surface of the polymer resin. Since Projection Micro-stereolithography is time-saving, the same experiment can be done on different liquid soft materials in order to learn the swelling effect of them. Based on this contraction and extension of materials caused by a small drop of solvent or a small change in environmental conditions, this microactuator can mimic the motion of the human muscle and can be used on many soft robotic applications.

=== Artificial Tissue ===
Many reconstructive surgery procedures require new tissues when the original tissues are removed because of illnesses. One way to generate this new tissue is to take one part of tissue from another part of the human body and transfer it to the new site. However, this method causes damage to other organs while generating new tissues. Therefore, fabricating artificial tissues is a preferred approach to solve this problem. The major limitation of this artificial tissue is the absence of the capillary system to transport nutrient and oxygen like the circulatory systems in living organisms. With the ability to fabricate complex 3D structures, the Projection Micro-stereolithography may provide one of the best solutions to this tissue. Like the microactuator, the mold of the artificial tissue is made by CAD. Then the CAD mold is transferred to 2D images and projected to the surface of the polymer resin through a lens. The capillary system is embedded in the tissue during the mold designing process in the CAD mold. The polymer used in fabricating the tissue is semi-permeable, which allows the nutrient and oxygen in the capillary system go into the tissue during the transportation process. The capillary system is shown to have growth promoting function in yeast cells, which illustrate the viability of this artificial tissue.

== See also ==
- Continuous Liquid Interface Production
