= GIPSICAM =

GIPSICAM (Global-Inertial Positioning Systems Image Capture for Asset Management) is a mobile-mapping system used internally by the Roads & Maritime Services to survey New South Wales state roads. The main components of the system include multiple redundant GPS receivers, INS (a part of the GIPSITRAC module), data acquisition computers and cameras mounted inside a cupola on the vehicle roof.

The conventional instrument configuration is supported by comprehensive data processing algorithms and advanced geo-referencing techniques optimized for independent positioning and road geometry modelling.
