= Laser scanning =

Controlled deflection of laser beams

Laser scanning is the controlled deflection of laser beams, visible or invisible. Scanned laser beams are used in some 3-D printers, in rapid prototyping, in machines for material processing, in laser engraving machines, in ophthalmological laser systems for the treatment of presbyopia, in confocal microscopy, in laser printers, in laser shows, in Laser TV, and in barcode scanners. Applications specific to mapping and 3D object reconstruction are known as 3D laser scanner.

== Technology ==
=== Scanning mirrors ===
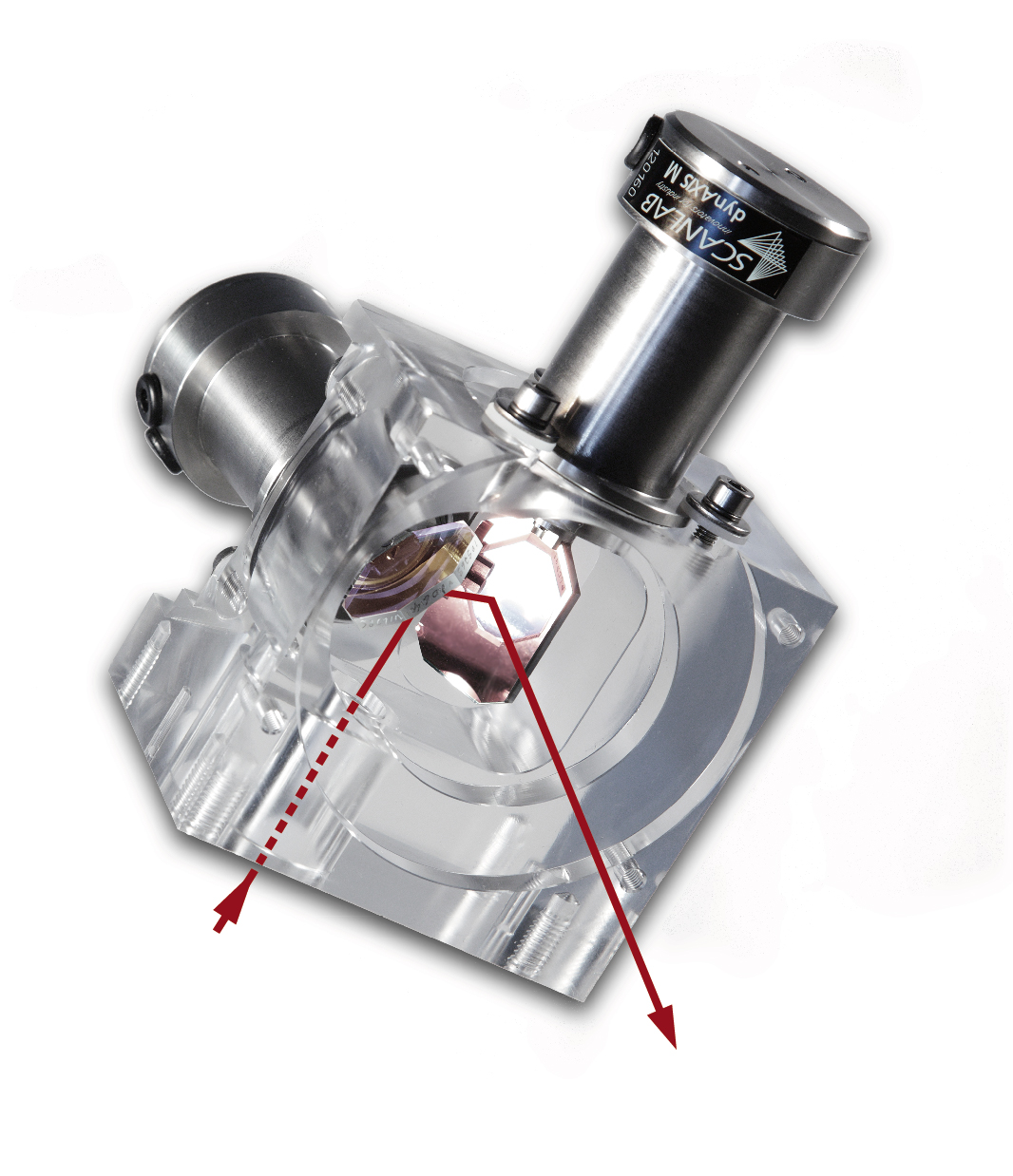
Laser scanning module with two galvanometers, from Scanlab AG. The red arrow shows the path of the laser beam.

Most laser scanners use moveable mirrors to steer the laser beam. The steering of the beam can be one-dimensional, as inside a laser printer, or two-dimensional, as in a laser show system. Additionally, the mirrors can lead to a periodic motion - like the rotating polygon mirror in a barcode scanner or so-called resonant galvanometer scanners - or to a freely addressable motion, as in servo-controlled galvanometer scanners. One also uses the terms raster scanning and vector scanning to distinguish the two situations. To control the scanning motion, scanners need a rotary encoder and control electronics that provide, for a desired angle or phase, the suitable electric current to the motor (for a polygon mirror) or galvanometer (also called galvos). A software system usually controls the scanning motion and, if 3D scanning is implemented, also the collection of the measured data.

In order to position a laser beam in two dimensions, it is possible either to rotate one mirror along two axes - used mainly for slow scanning systems - or to reflect the laser beam onto two closely spaced mirrors that are mounted on orthogonal axes. Each of the two flat or polygon (polygonal) mirrors is then driven by a galvanometer or by an electric motor respectively. Two-dimensional systems are essential for most applications in material processing, confocal microscopy, and medical science. Some applications require positioning the focus of a laser beam in three dimensions. This is achieved by a servo-controlled lens system, usually called a 'focus shifter' or 'z-shifter'. Many laser scanners further allow changing the laser intensity.

In laser projectors for laser TV or laser displays, the three fundamental colors - red, blue, and green - are combined in a single beam and then reflected together with two mirrors.

The most common way to move mirrors is, as mentioned, the use of an electric motor or of a galvanometer. However, piezoelectric actuators or magnetostrictive actuators are alternative options. They offer higher achievable angular speeds, but often at the expense of smaller achievable maximum angles. There are also microscanners, which are MEMS devices containing a small (millimeter) mirror that has controllable tilt in one or two dimensions; these are used in pico projectors.

=== Scanning refractive optics ===
Risley prisms steer beams using two rotating prisms.

When two Risley prisms are rotated against each other, a beam of light can be scanned at will inside a cone. Such scanners are used for tracking missiles.

When two optical lenses are moved or rotated against each other, a laser beam can be scanned in a way similar to mirror scanners.

=== Material effects ===
Some special laser scanners use, instead of moving mirrors, acousto-optic deflectors or electro-optic deflectors. These mechanisms allow the highest scanning frequencies possible so far. They are used, for example, in laser TV systems. On the other hand, these systems are also much more expensive than mirror scanning systems.

=== Phased array scanning ===
Research is going on to achieve scanning of laser beams through phased arrays. This method is used to scan radar beams without moving parts. With the use of vertical-cavity surface-emitting laser (VCSELs), it might be possible to realize fast laser scanners in the foreseeable future.

== Applications ==
=== 3D object scanning ===
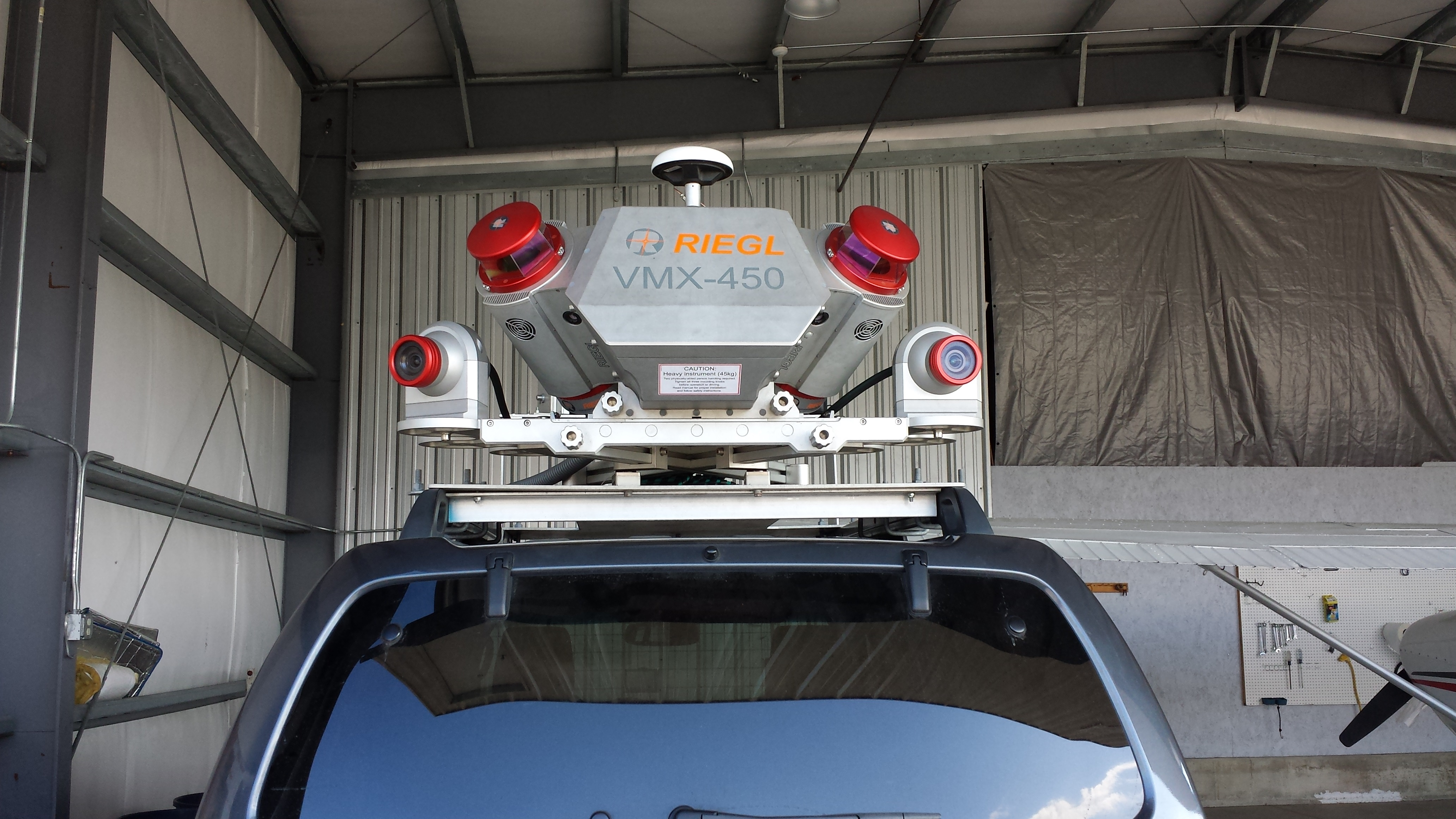
A high speed mobile laser scanning system for 3D data acquisition mounted on an automobile.

Within the field of 3D object scanning, laser scanning (also known as lidar) combines controlled steering of laser beams with a laser rangefinder. By taking a distance measurement at every direction the scanner rapidly captures the surface shape of objects, buildings and landscapes. Construction of a full 3D model involves combining multiple surface models obtained from different viewing angles, or the admixing of other known constraints. Small objects can be placed on a revolving pedestal, in a technique akin to photogrammetry.

3D object scanning allows enhancing the design process, speeds up and reduces data collection errors, saves time and money, and thus makes it an attractive alternative to traditional data collection techniques. 3D scanning is also used for mobile mapping, surveying, scanning of buildings and building interiors, and in archaeology.

=== Material processing ===
Depending on the power of the laser, its influence on a working piece differs: lower power values are used for laser engraving and laser ablation, where material is partially removed by the laser. With higher powers the material becomes fluid and laser welding can be realized, or if the power is high enough to remove the material completely, then laser cutting can be performed. Modern lasers can cut steel blocks with a thickness of 10 cm and more or ablate a layer of the cornea that is only a few micrometers thick.

The ability of lasers to harden liquid polymers, together with laser scanners, is used in rapid prototyping, the ability to melt polymers and metals is, with laser scanners, to produce parts by laser sintering or laser melting.

The principle that is used for all these applications is the same: software that runs on a PC or an embedded system and that controls the complete process is connected with a scanner card. That card converts the received vector data to movement information which is sent to the scanhead. This scanhead consists of two mirrors that are able to deflect the laser beam in one level (X- and Y-coordinate). The third dimension is - if necessary - realized by a specific optic that is able to move the laser's focal point in the depth-direction (Z-axis).

Scanning the laser focus in the third spatial dimension is needed for some special applications like the laser scribing of curved surfaces or for in-glass-marking where the laser has to influence the material at specific positions within it. For these cases it is important that the laser has as small a focal point as possible.

For enhanced laser scanning applications and/or high material throughput during production, scanning systems with more than one scanhead are used. Here the software has to control what is done exactly within such a multihead application: it is possible that all available heads have to mark the same to finish processing faster or that the heads mark one single job in parallel where every scanhead performs a part of the job in case of large working areas.

=== Barcode readers ===
Many barcode readers, especially those with the ability to read bar codes at a distance of a few meters, use scanned laser beams. In these devices, a semiconductor laser beam is usually scanned with the help of a resonant mirror scanner. The mirror is driven electromagnetically and is made of a metal-coated polymer.

=== Space flight ===
When a space transporter has to dock to the space station, it must carefully maneuver to the correct position. In order to determine its relative position to the space station, laser scanners built into the front of the space transporter scan the shape of the space station and then determine, through a computer, the maneuvering commands. Resonant galvanometer scanners are used for this application.

=== Laser shows ===
Laser light shows typically uses two galvanometer scanners on an X-Y configuration to draw patterns or images on walls, ceilings or other surfaces including theatrical smoke and fog for entertainment or promotional purposes.
