= Dara Treseder =

American businesswomen

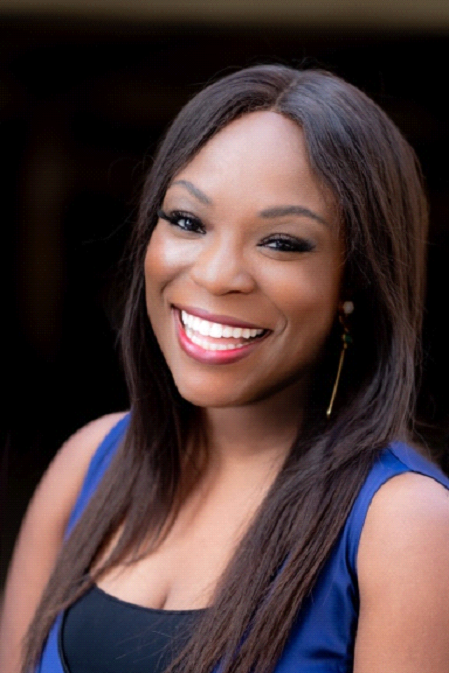
- Born: Oluwadara Johnson Treseder; Nigeria
- Education: Harvard University; Stanford Graduate School of Business
- Occupations: Businessperson, marketing executive, technology executive
- Employer(s): Apple Inc. Autodesk; Carbon; General Electric; Peloton Interactive
- Title: Chief Marketing Officer
- Website: daratreseder.com

Oluwadara Johnson Treseder is an American business executive, born in Ibadan, Nigeria. She graduated cum laude from Harvard University and Stanford Graduate School of Business, where she obtained an MBA in 2014. Treseder is a founding member of the Black Executive CMO Alliance, and serves on the boards of Robinhood the Public Health Institute. She is one of a team of backers of W Magazine.

Treseder is currently the chief marketing officer of Autodesk. Her previous roles include CMO at GE Business Innovations and GE Ventures, chief marketing officer at Carbon, and SVP and head of global marketing, communications, and membership of exercise equipment company Peloton.

== Career ==
Treseder is currently the chief marketing officer of Autodesk. According to Business Insider, she has "pulled the company into the spotlight" and "helped contribute to fourth-quarter revenue of $1.32 billion, up by 12% from the same period prior", as well as helped to increase the number of educators and students using Autodesk products from 55 million to 65 million.

Treseder started working at Autodesk in October 2022. Within her first six months at the company, she launched three major brand campaigns—the Game of Thrones finale, The Oscars, and the company's work in helping the French government rebuild the Notre Dame Cathedral. Within one month of joining Autodesk, Treseder worked with Ryan Reynolds' agency, Maximum Effort, to launch the company's first TV ad in over ten years.

In 2023, Treseder launched the "Otto Desć" campaign during the 2023 Oscars, which received over 25 million views. The campaign also marked the first time that Autodesk worked with influencers.

Treseder's campaigns are among Autodesk's first broad-reach brand campaigns, with the metrics for each seeing a significant increase under her marketing influence. As of April, the company reported YoY quarterly revenue growth of over 8%, and, as of the close of markets on June 16, its stock is up 27%, also YoY.

Early in her career, she was a marketing manager at FileMaker Inc. and Goldman Sachs. Afterwards, she worked as CMO at GE Business Innovations and GE Ventures, as chief marketing officer at Carbon, and as SVP and head of global marketing, communications, and membership of exercise equipment company Peloton.

She was featured on Forbes' CMO Next 2018 list. She was also featured on Business Insider’s most innovative CMOs of 2023.

Treseder is the Chair of the board of the Public Health Institute (PHI), a non-profit organization that works to improve health, equity, and wellness in communities around the world.

== Peloton ==
Treseder's transition to Peloton garnered high praise, with NPR hailing her as "one of the most influential marketing leaders of her generation." Marie Claire magazine credited her as being behind the success of Peloton during the COVID-19 pandemic.

In 2022, she was recognized by Forbes as the most influential CMO in the world, which cited her ability "to think and act quickly in response to the unforeseen" with regularity, and her "cultural attention".

Weeks after a broader executive shakeout, Treseder announced that she would be leaving the company to take on the role of Chief Marketing Officer of Autodesk during the final quarter of that year. An article published by Yahoo Finance suggests that this news may have negatively impacted the price of Peloton shares. In Treseder's tenure Peloton's membership doubled and reached more than 6.9 million.

Treseder oversaw brand marketing, consumer insights, and communications at Peloton, including the launch of the Bike+, Tread, Peloton Guide and its rowing machine Peloton Row. She launched the #MyPelotonReason campaign that provided a forum for members to share their stories and continued to grow Peloton's community of riders. She also worked on content partnerships with Usain Bolt and longtime member Beyoncé.

== Personal life ==
She is married to William Treseder; they have two children.
