= Magnetically assisted slip casting =

Manufacturing technique

Magnetically assisted slip casting is a manufacturing technique that uses anisotropic stiff nanoparticle platelets in a ceramic, metal or polymer functional matrix to produce layered objects that can mimic natural objects such as nacre. Each layer of platelets is oriented in a different direction, giving the resulting object greater strength. The inventors claimed that the process is 10x faster than commercial 3D printing. The magnetisation and orientation of the ceramic platelets has been patented.

== Technique ==
The technique involves pouring a suspension of magnetized ceramic micro-plates. Pores in the plaster mold absorb the liquid from the suspension, solidifying the material from the outside in. The particles are subjected to a strong magnetic field as they solidify that causes them to align in one direction. The field's orientation is changed at regular intervals, moving the plates still in suspension, without disturbing already-solidified plates. By varying the composition of the suspension and the direction of the platelets, a continuous process can produce multiple layers with differing material properties in a single object. The resulting objects can closely imitate their natural models.

== Artificial tooth ==
Researchers produced an artificial tooth whose microstructure mimicked that of a real tooth. The outer layers, corresponding to enamel, were hard and structurally complex. The outer layers contained glass nanoparticles and aluminium oxide plates were aligned perpendicular to the surface. After the outer layers hardened, a second suspension was poured. It contained no glass, and the plates were aligned horizontally to the surface of the tooth. These deeper layers were tougher, resembling dentine. The tooth was then cooked at 1,600 degrees to compact and harden the material — a process known as sintering. The last step involved filling remaining pores with a synthetic monomer used in dentistry, which polymerizes after treatment. Hardness and durability approximated that of both the enamel and dentine of a tooth.

== See also ==
- 3D printing
- Continuous Liquid Interface Production
