= Carbon (company) =

American manufacturer of 3D printers

Carbon, Inc.
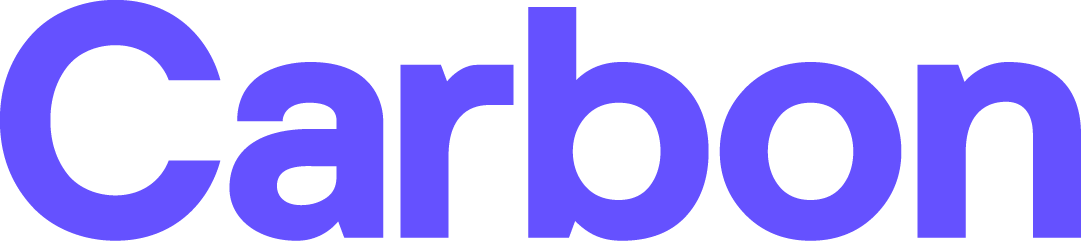
- Company type: Private
- Industry: Technology
- Founded: December 2013; 12 years ago
- Founder: Joseph DeSimone; Philip DeSimone; Alex Ermoshkin; Nikita Ermoshkin; Edward Samulski; Steve Nelson
- Headquarters: 1089 Mills Way, Redwood City, California, United States
- Number of locations: 3 offices (2019)
- Area served: Worldwide; 11 countries
- Key people: Craig Carlson (CEO); Philip DeSimone (CEO); Ellen J. Kullman (Executive Chair)
- Products: Carbon M1 printer, M2 printer, M2d printer, M3 printer, M3 Max printer, C6 cassette, L1 printer, Smart Part Washer, programmable resins
- Website: www.carbon3d.com

Carbon, Inc. is a digital manufacturing company that manufactures and develops 3D printers utilizing the Continuous Liquid Interface Production process. The company was founded in 2013, and maintains its headquarters in California, United States.

== History ==
The company was founded in 2013 by Dr. Alex Ermoshkin based on ideas he originally developed with his son, Nikita Ermoshkin, to develop their own at-home 3D printer and further refined with input from Dr. Joseph DeSimone. In March 2015, Joseph gave a TED talk that previewed a 3D printer prototype using Continuous Liquid Interface Production (CLIP). Carbon engaged in four fundraising ventures between 2014 and 2017 from investors such as Sequoia Capital, Google Venture, GE, Fidelity Management & Research, Adidas, BMW, and Johnson & Johnson.

Craig Carlson left Tesla to lead Carbon's engineering team in 2014. In March 2016, Silicon Valley–based entrepreneur Josh Green joined as general counsel. In November 2018, Elisa de Martel was named chief financial officer. In December 2018, Dara Treseder joined as the company’s first chief marketing officer. In November 2019, Ellen Kullman was appointed President and CEO. Kullman served on Carbon's board prior to becoming President and CEO. Carbon’s board of directors includes former Ford CEO Alan Mulally, and Sequoia Capital partner Jim Goetz.

== Products ==
Carbon offers several varieties of hardware and software that use digital light synthesis, a technique developed by the company. 3D printer models are differentiated by the size of the build area. They are connected to the cloud to allow for predictive maintenance, remote monitoring, and over-the-air software updates. The company has made three series of printers – the M1, M2, and M3 printer. There is also the large scale printer designed for high-volume production called the L1 printer. The company has also made a part washer named the Smart Part Washer, which also records product information in addition to washing and serializing parts.

== See also ==
- Additive manufacturing
- List of 3D printer manufacturers
