= Joseph DeSimone =

American chemist, inventor and entrepreneur

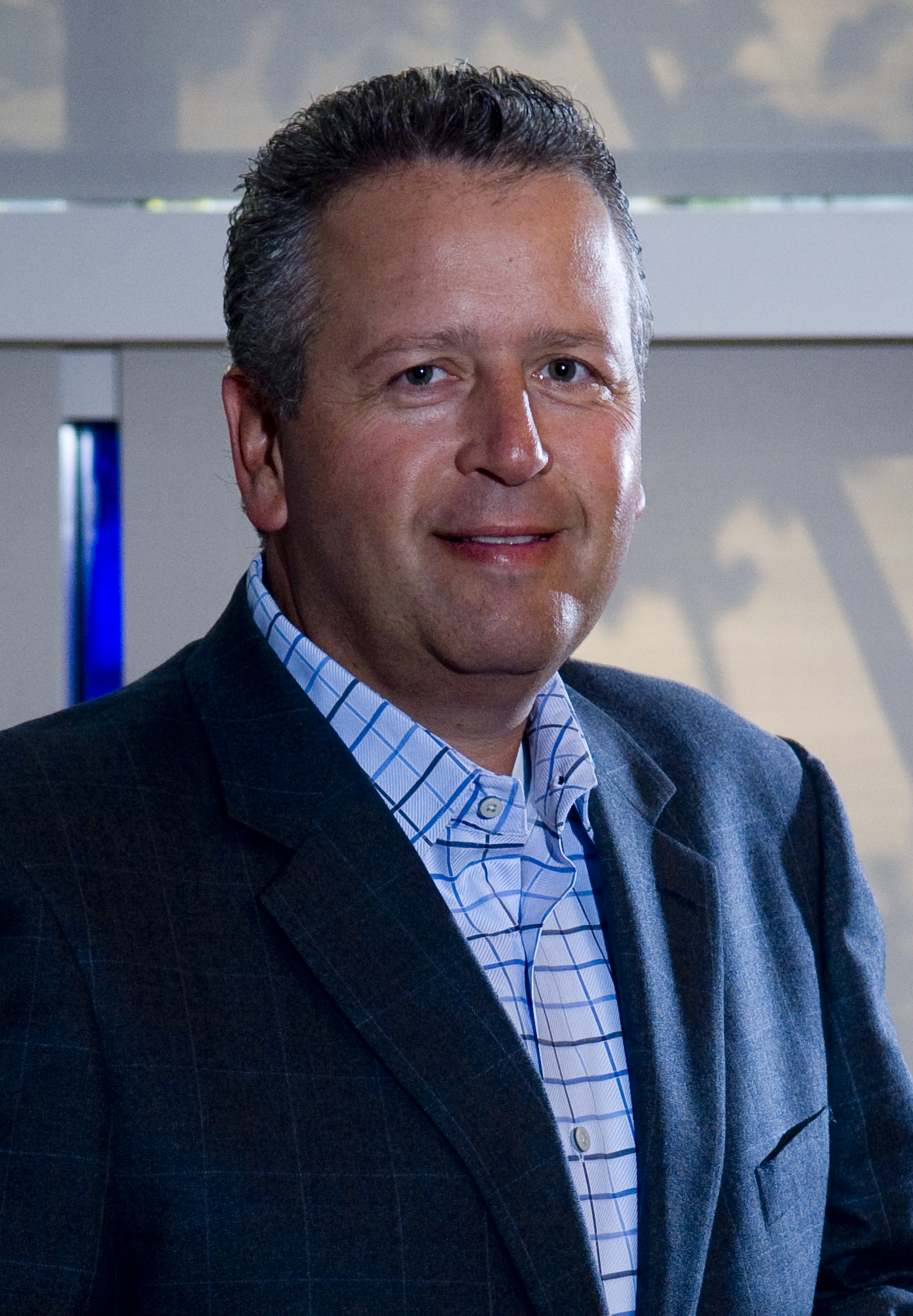
- DeSimone in 2008
- Born: May 16, 1964 (age 62)
- Education: Ursinus College, Virginia Polytechnic Institute and State University
- Awards: Heinz Award in Technology, Economy & Employment (2017); National Medal of Technology and Innovation (2013); Lemelson–MIT Prize (2008); IRI Medal (2014); Dickson Prize in Science (2014); Harvey Prize (2020)
- Scientific career
- Workplaces: University of North Carolina at Chapel Hill, North Carolina State University
- Thesis: Synthesis of well-defined single and multiphase polymers using various living polymerization methods (1990)
- Doctoral advisor: James E. McGrath
- Doctoral students: Valerie Sheares Ashby

Joseph M. DeSimone (born May 16, 1964) is an American chemist, inventor, and entrepreneur who has co-founded companies based on his research, including the American 3D printing technology company, Carbon, of which he was CEO from 2014 until November 2019.

Currently, DeSimone is the Sanjiv Sam Gambhir Professor of Translational Medicine in the department of radiology at Stanford University, where he is also professor of chemical engineering. He joined the faculty at Stanford in 2020. In 2020, he was also elected to the board of trustees of the National Geographic Society. DeSimone previously held a joint appointment as the Chancellor's Eminent Professor of Chemistry at the University of North Carolina at Chapel Hill and William R. Kenan Jr. Distinguished Professor of Chemical Engineering at North Carolina State University.

== Education ==
DeSimone received his BS in chemistry in 1986 from Ursinus College in Collegeville, Pennsylvania and his PhD in chemistry in 1990 from Virginia Tech in Blacksburg, Virginia.

== Career ==
DeSimone is a member of the National Academy of Medicine (2014), National Academy of Sciences (2012), and the National Academy of Engineering (2005). He is also a member of the American Academy of Arts and Sciences (2005).

External videos
- Joseph DeSimone: What if 3D printing was 100x faster?, TED Talks

In the 1990s, at the University of North Carolina at Chapel Hill, he developed an environmentally friendly manufacturing process that relies on supercritical carbon dioxide instead of water and bio-persistent surfactants for the creation of fluoropolymers or high-performance plastics, such as Teflon. In recognition of this work, DeSimone received the U.S. Environmental Protection Agency's Presidential Green Chemistry Challenge Award in 1997. In 2002 DeSimone, along with Richard Stack, a cardiologist at Duke University, co-founded Bioabsorbable Vascular Solutions (BVS) to commercialize a fully bioabsorbable, drug-eluting stent for the treatment of coronary artery disease.

As a professor at the University of North Carolina at Chapel Hill and North Carolina State University, DeSimone and members of his academic laboratory also developed the nanoparticle fabrication technology, PRINT (Particle Replication in Non-Wetting Templates), leading DeSimone and students to co-found the company Liquidia Technologies in 2004. Liquidia develops PRINT particle-based medical treatments and became a publicly traded company in 2018. At the University of North Carolina at Chapel Hill, the PRINT technology also became a foundation for the Carolina Center for Cancer Nanotechnology Excellence funded by the National Cancer Institute.

In 2015, DeSimone and colleagues published a paper in Science Magazine on their invention of a rapid polymer 3D printing technology, Continuous Liquid Interface Production (CLIP). The company, Carbon, which DeSimone co-founded, now develops printers with the CLIP technology. The printers are used to make end-use parts and products in several industries, including by the companies Adidas, Resolution Medical, and Ford. Recently, DeSimone has also been involved in the digital fabrication space using computational design to speed up the former method.

=== Awards and honors ===
DeSimone received the U.S. Environmental Protection Agency's Presidential Green Chemistry Challenge Award in 1997 for developing environmentally friendly manufacturing processes for fluoropolymers using supercritical carbon dioxide. DeSimone is the recipient of the 2002 John Scott Award presented by the Board of Directors of City Trusts, Philadelphia, given to "the most deserving" men and women whose inventions have contributed in some outstanding way to the "comfort, welfare and happiness" of mankind; the 2008 Lemelson–MIT Prize, the 2009 North Carolina Award; the 2009 NIH Director's Pioneer Award; the 2014 Dickson Prize in Science; and the 2014 IRI Medal.

DeSimone was awarded the National Medal of Technology and Innovation, the highest honor in the U.S. for achievements related to technological progress, by President Barack Obama at the White House in May 2016. In 2017, Dr. DeSimone received the 22nd Annual Heinz Award in Technology, the Economy, and Employment. In 2019, DeSimone received the Wilhelm Exner Medal in Polymer Manufacturing. Also in 2019, he was named the U.S. Entrepreneur Of The Year, National Overall Award winner by Ernst & Young. For the years 2019-2020 he was awarded the Harvey Prize of the Technion in Israel. In 2021, he received the Charles Goodyear Medal from the American Chemical Society Rubber Division.
