= Carbon nanotube actuators =

The exceptional electrical and mechanical properties of carbon nanotubes have made them alternatives to the traditional electrical actuators for both microscopic and macroscopic applications. Carbon nanotubes are very good conductors of both electricity and heat, and are also very strong and elastic molecules in certain directions. These properties are difficult to find in the same material and very needed for high performance actuators. For current carbon nanotube actuators, multi-walled carbon nanotubes (MWNTs) and bundles of MWNTs have been widely used mostly due to the easiness of handling and robustness. Solution dispersed thick films and highly ordered transparent films of carbon nanotubes have been used for the macroscopic applications.

== Microscopic applications ==
=== Carbon nano-tweezers ===
Carbon nanotube tweezers have been fabricated by deposition of MWNT bundles on isolated electrodes deposited on tempered glass micropipettes. Those nanotube bundles can be mechanically manipulated by electricity and can be used to manipulate and transfer micro- and nano-structures. The nanotube bundles used for tweezers are about 50 nm in diameter and 2 μm in lengths. Under electric bias, two close sets of bundles are attracted and can be used as nanoscale tweezers.

=== Nanotube on/off switches and random access memory ===
Harvard researchers have used the electrostatic attraction principle to design on/off switches for their proposed nanotube Random Access Memory devices. They used carbon nanotube bundles of ≈50 nm in diameter to fabricate their proof-of-concept prototypes. One set of MWNT bundles are laid on the substrate and another set of bundles is trenched on top of the underlying nanotube bundles with an air gap in between them. Once electrical bias is applied, the sets of nanotube bundles are attracted, thus changing the electrical resistance. These two states of resistance are on and off states. Using this approach, more than 10 times the difference between off and on state resistances has been achieved. Furthermore, this idea can be used to create very highly packed arrays of nanoswitches and random access memory devices, if they can be applied to arrays of single-walled carbon nanotubes, which are about 1 nm in diameter and hundreds of micrometres in length. The current technical challenge with this design is the lack of control to place arrays of carbon nanotubes on substrate. This method is followed by some researches at Shahid Chamran University of Ahvaz as well.

=== Carbon nano-heat engine ===
A research group at Shanghai University led by Tienchong Chang have found a domino-like motion in carbon nanotubes, which can be reversed by translating direction when different temperatures are applied. This phenomenon makes it possible to use carbon nanotubes as a heat engine working between two heat sources.

== Macroscopic applications ==
=== Nanotube sheet electrodes as actuators ===
Researchers of AlliedSignal initially demonstrated the possibility of electrically powered actuators fabricated by carbon nanotube sheets. They taped carbon nanotube sheets on two sides of a double sided scotch tape and applied potential on the nanotube sheets in a NaCl electrolyte solution. Nanotube sheets are used as electrolyte-filled electrodes of a supercapacitor. Nanotube sheets are electrically charged by the double layer formation at the nanotube-electrolyte interface without any need of ion intercalation. Therefore, electrically driven actuators of nanotube sheets are superior to the conjugated polymer actuators which involve solid-state dopant diffusion and structural changes limiting rate, cycle life, and energy conversion efficiencies. On the other hand, ferroelectric and electrostrictive materials are also very useful for direct energy conversion, but they require high operation voltages and ambient temperature of a limited range. Nanotube sheet actuators were shown to operate at low voltages (≈1 volts or less) and provide higher work densities per cycle than other alternative technologies. Later Baughman et al. showed that actuator response can be observed up to switching rates of 1 kHz and cycling the nanotube actuator at constant rate of 1 Hz for 140,000 cycles decreases the stroke by ≈33%. 0.75 MPa of stress were measured on the nanotube sheet actuators, which is greater than the maximum stress (0.3 MPa) that can be loaded on a human muscle.

The maximum actuator strain for electrically driven actuators of carbon nanotube sheets can be improved up to 0.7% in a 1 M electrolyte once the sheets are annealed in an inert atmosphere at very high temperatures (1,100 °C, 2,000 °F) in contrast to once-reported 0.1% or less for low electrochemical potentials (≈1 V or less). The maximum strain for the carbon nanotube sheet actuators at low voltages is greater than that of the high-modulus ferroelectric ceramic actuators (≈0.1%), but it is lower than that of the low-voltage (≈0.4 V) conducting polymer actuators (≈3% film direction, 20% thickness direction). Strokes were reported as high as 215% for strain-biased low-modulus electrostrictive rubbers under biases greater than 1 kV (corresponding to an electric field 239 MV/m for the geometry mentioned in the reference paper). Spinks et al. realized pneumatic actuation from the carbon nanotube sheets in electrolyte solutions with high electrochemical potential (1.5 V), which cause gas generation in the electrolyte. The released gas dramatically increases the actuator stroke from the carbon nanotube sheet. Thickness of the carbon nanotube sheet expands by ≈300% and the sheet plane contracts by 3%.

=== Artificial muscles and giant strokes by MWNT aerogel sheets ===
Highly ordered free-standing aerogel sheets of MWNTs can be realized by simply drawing the sheet from the sidewalls of CVD-grown MWNT forests. UT Dallas researchers came up with the conventional method where they attach an adhesive tape to the sidewalls of MWNT forests and pull the tape at a constant rate as fast as 7 meters per minute (0.26 mph) to get 3–5 cm wide aerogel sheets of aligned MWNTs which have exceptional mechanical and optical properties. The aerogel sheets have a density of ≈1.5 mg/cm^{3}, an areal density of 1-3 μg/cm^{2}, and a thickness of ≈20 μm. The thickness is decreased to ≈50 nm by liquid-based densification to decrease the volume. The aerogel sheets can be stretched as much as three times along the width while low-modulus rubber like behavior is remained.

Having aerogel sheets of MWNTs, UT researchers fabricated actuators with giant strokes (≈180% actuation along the width) with 5 ms delay time between applying the potential and observing the maximum stroke. Therefore, the actuation rate is slightly better than that of the human muscle. This is a very important achievement considering the actuation rate for artificial muscles used in robots is typically much slower. Furthermore, the use of carbon nanotubes as the building blocks as an artificial muscle also helps in terms of strength and robustness by making the artificial muscle stronger than steel in one direction and more flexible than rubber in the other two directions. The lack of electrolyte solution and temperature robustness of the aerogel sheet in inert ambient makes high temperature operation possible. The actuation stroke decreases by only 50% from its room-temperature value to 1,344 °C (2,451 °F). Thus, this design of artificial muscles can be quite useful for many industrial applications with the drawback of high-voltage operation for giant strokes.

== Challenges and future applications ==
As a result, carbon nanotubes have been shown to be great materials for actuation-related applications. The subfield of carbon nanotube actuators have been quite successful and ready for scalable applications, considering there are quite a few conventional and scalable methods for the synthesis of large-scale carbon nanotubes. Carbon nanotube sheets used as electrodes in electrolyte solutions enable low voltage operations at room-temperature with actuation strokes and rates comparable to the conducting polymer actuators, but with higher work densities per cycle and lifetimes. However, the actuation strokes are much smaller than those of the electrostrictive rubbers which operate at voltages three orders of magnitude higher. On the other hand, realization of carbon nanotube aerogels made possible giant strokes compararable to electrostrictive rubbers at room temperature, but carbon nanotube aerogels can perform at a very wide range of temperatures and with very high actuation rates, which are even better than the actuation rate of human muscles.

== See also ==
- Mechanical properties of carbon nanotubes
- Optical properties of carbon nanotubes
