= Mechanical properties of carbon nanotubes =

The mechanical properties of carbon nanotubes in many respects classify them as one of the strongest materials in nature. Carbon nanotubes (CNTs) are long hollow cylinders of graphene. Although graphene sheets have 2D symmetry, carbon nanotubes by geometry have different properties in axial and radial directions. It has been shown that CNTs are very strong in the axial direction. Young's modulus on the order of 270–950 GPa and tensile strength of 11–63 GPa have been obtained.

== Strength ==
Carbon nanotubes are the strongest and stiffest materials so far discovered in their tensile strength and elastic modulus. This strength results from the covalent sp^{2} bonds formed between the individual carbon atoms. In 2000, a multi-walled carbon nanotube was tested to have a tensile strength of 63 gigapascals (9,100,000 psi). (For illustration, this translates into the ability to endure tension of a weight equivalent to 6,422 kilograms-force (62,980 N; 14,160 lbf) on a cable with cross-section of 1 square millimetre (0.0016 sq in). Further studies, such as one conducted in 2008, revealed that individual CNT shells have strengths of up to ≈100 gigapascals (15,000,000 psi), which is in agreement with quantum and atomistic models. Since carbon nanotubes have a low density for a solid of 1.3 to 1.4 g/cm^{3}, its specific strength of up to 48,000 kN·m·kg^{−1} is the best of known materials, compared to high-carbon steel's 154 kN·m·kg^{−1}.

Under excessive tensile strain, the tubes will undergo plastic deformation, which means the deformation is permanent. This deformation begins at strains of approximately 5% and can increase the maximum strain the tubes undergo before fracture by releasing strain energy.

Although the strength of individual CNT shells is extremely high, weak shear interactions between adjacent shells and tubes lead to significant reduction in the effective strength of multi-walled carbon nanotubes and carbon nanotube bundles down to only a few GPa. This limitation has been recently addressed by applying high-energy electron irradiation, which crosslinks inner shells and tubes, and effectively increases the strength of these materials to ≈60 GPa for multi-walled carbon nanotubes and ≈17 GPa for double-walled carbon nanotube bundles.

CNTs are not nearly as strong under compression. Because of their hollow structure and high aspect ratio, they tend to undergo buckling when placed under compressive, torsional, or bending stress.

Comparison of mechanical properties
Material	Young's modulus (TPa)	Tensile strength (GPa)	Elongation at break (%)
Single-Walled Carbon Nanotubes (SWNT)^{E}	≈1 (from 1 to 5)	13–53	16
Armchair SWNT^{T}	0.94	126.2	23.1
Zigzag SWNT^{T}	0.94	94.5	15.6–17.5
Chiral SWNT	0.92		
MWNT^{E}	0.2–0.8–0.95	11–63–150	
Stainless steel^{E}	0.186–0.214	0.38–1.55	15–50
Kevlar–29&149^{E}	0.06–0.18	3.6–3.8	≈2

^{E}Experimental observation; ^{T}Theoretical prediction

=== Radial elasticity ===
On the other hand, there was evidence that in the radial direction they are rather soft. The first transmission electron microscope observation of radial elasticity suggested that even the van der Waals forces can deform two adjacent nanotubes. Later, nanoindentations with atomic force microscope were performed by several groups to quantitatively measure radial elasticity of multiwalled carbon nanotubes and tapping/contact mode atomic force microscopy was also performed on single-walled carbon nanotubes. Young's modulus of on the order of several GPa showed that CNTs are in fact very soft in the radial direction. A complete phase diagram giving the transition to the radially collapsed geometry as function of diameter, pressure and number of tube-walls has been produced from semiempirical grounds.

Radial direction elasticity of CNTs is important especially for carbon nanotube composites where the embedded tubes are subjected to large deformation in the transverse direction under the applied load on the composite structure.

One of the main problems in characterizing the radial elasticity of CNTs is the knowledge about the internal radius of the CNT; carbon nanotubes with identical outer diameter may have different internal diameter (or the number of walls). In 2008, a method using an atomic force microscope was introduced to determine the exact number of layers and hence the internal diameter of the CNT. In this way, mechanical characterization is more accurate.

== Hardness ==
Standards single-walled carbon nanotubes can withstand a pressure up to 25 GPa without plastic/permanent deformation. They then undergo a transformation to superhard phase nanotubes. Maximum pressures measured using current experimental techniques are around 55 GPa. However, these new superhard phase nanotubes collapse at an even higher, albeit unknown, pressure.

The bulk modulus of superhard phase nanotubes is 462 to 546 GPa, even higher than that of diamond (420 GPa for single diamond crystal).

== Wettability ==
The surface wettability of CNT is of importance for its applications in various settings. Although the intrinsic contact angle of graphite is around 90°, the contact angles of most as-synthesized CNT arrays are over 160°, exhibiting a superhydrophobic property. By applying a voltage as low as 1.3 V, the extreme water repellant surface can be switched to a superhydrophilic one.

== Kinetic properties ==
Multi-walled nanotubes are multiple concentric nanotubes precisely nested within one another. These exhibit a striking telescoping property whereby an inner nanotube core may slide, almost without friction, within its outer nanotube shell, thus creating an atomically perfect linear or rotational bearing. This is one of the first true examples of molecular nanotechnology, the precise positioning of atoms to create useful machines. Already, this property has been utilized to create the world's smallest rotational motor. Future applications such as a gigahertz mechanical oscillator are also envisioned.

== Defects ==
As with any material, the existence of a crystallographic defect affects the material properties. Defects can occur in the form of atomic vacancies. High levels of such defects can lower the tensile strength by up to 85%. An important example is the Stone–Wales defect, otherwise known as the 5-7-7-5 defect because it creates a pentagon and heptagon pair by rearrangement of the bonds. Because of the very small structure of CNTs, the tensile strength of the tube is dependent on its weakest segment in a similar manner to a chain, where the strength of the weakest link becomes the maximum strength of the chain.

== Plastic deformation ==
A typical 3D material undergoes plastic deformation, meaning that the deformation is permanent, by the movement of 1D dislocations through the material. During this process, these dislocations can interact with each other and multiply. Because CNTs are themselves 1D materials, the well-known generation and multiplication mechanisms (such as a Frank-Read source) for 1D dislocations do not apply.

Instead, CNTs undergo plastic deformation through the formation and movement of defects, primarily topological defects such as the Stone–Wales defect or 5-7-7-5 defect. The 5-7-7-5 defect can also be thought of as a pair of 5-7 defects, in which each defect is adjacent to one 5-membered and two 7-membered rings. This defect structure is metastable, so it takes an energy of several eV to nucleate, or form. In addition, the defect moves by the separate migration of the 5-7 defect pairs. This motion is also associated with an energy barrier. The exact energy depends on the configuration and chirality of the particular CNT. The activation energy for the formation of these defects in a CNT of diameter $D$ and chiral angle $\chi$ can be estimated as

$E=10.0-0.58/D-17.5\epsilon-27\epsilon \sin(2\chi+46^{\circ})$ eV,

where $\epsilon$ is the external strain. This activation energy barrier partially explains the low ductility of CNTs (~6–15%) at room temperature. However, it can be overcome at high temperatures or with the application of suitable strains. For example, the defect is nucleated at positions experiencing high tensile stress in armchair-type CNTs, and at positions experiencing high compressive stress in zigag-type CNTs.

Applied stresses can overcome the energy barrier needed to move 5-7 defect pairs. Another way of understanding this is that when strained, a CNT releases strain by forming these defects spontaneously. For example, in (5,5) tubes, a critical tensile strain of ~5% results in defect generation. The defect structure reduces strain because the heptagon geometry is able to stretch more than the original hexagonal rings, while the C-C bond remains about the same length. Bending the tubes beyond a critical curvature has the same effect. This behavior can be approximated by a simple, semi-quantitative analysis. Applying a stress $\sigma$ over a tube of length $L$ and diameter $L$ does work approximately equal to

$$b\int_{0}^{L}\sigma(L)dL=\lambda b\rho D^2$$

on the tube, where $b$ is the Burgers vectors for the defect, $\rho$ is the bending curvature, and $\lambda$ relates the Young's modulus of the CNT to that of graphene. The energy increase resulting from the defect creation and the separation of the 5-7 pairs is approximately given by

$$E(L)=2E_{core}+A\lambda b^2 g(D)$$.

Here, $E_{core}$ is the dislocation core energy and $g(D)$ gives the interaction energy between the defect pairs. Defect motion occurs when the work done by an applied stress overcomes it, such that the required bending curvature is inversely proportional to the diameter of the CNT:

$$\rho_{yield}\approx \frac{2E_{core}/\lambda b+Abg(D)}{D^2}$$.

Similarly, thermal vibrations can provide the energy required for defect nucleation and motion. In fact, a combination of stress and high temperature is required to induce observable plastic deformation in CNTs. This has been achieved in the literature via the application of a current, which causes resistive heating in the material. For CNTs subjected to temperatures above 1500 K, elongations up to 280% have been reported. This kind of behavior is called superplasticity. At these high temperatures, kinks may form and move by climb as well as glide. Climb of kinks is evidenced by the fact that they do not always move along the close-packed planes in CNTs, but rather along the length of a tube. When kinks do glide along close-packed planes in CNTs, they follow a helical path. It is proposed that elevated temperatures allow for the diffusion of vacancies, so that defects climb through a process similar to that observed in 3D crystalline materials.
