= Microactuator =

Type of microscopic servomechanism

A microactuator is a microscopic servomechanism that supplies and transmits a measured amount of energy for the operation of another mechanism or system. As a general actuator, following standards have to be met:

- Large travel
- High precision
- Fast switching
- Low power consumption
- Power free force sustainability

For microactuator, there are two in addition

- Microstructurability
- Integrability

== Principle of microactuators ==
The basic principle can be described as the expression for mechanical work
$W=\overrightarrow{F}\cdot \Delta \overrightarrow{r}$
since an actuator is to manipulate positions and therefore force is needed. For different kind of microactuators, different physical principles are applied.

== Classes of microactuators ==
Sources:

- Electrostatic
- Electromagnetic
- Piezoelectric
- Fluid
- Thermal

== See also ==
- Newton's laws
- Euler–Bernoulli beam equation
- Electrostatics
- Electromagnetism
- Piezoelectricity
- Microfluidics
- Sensors
- Nanotube nanomotor
