= Mobile mapping =

Process of collecting geospatial data from a mobile vehicle

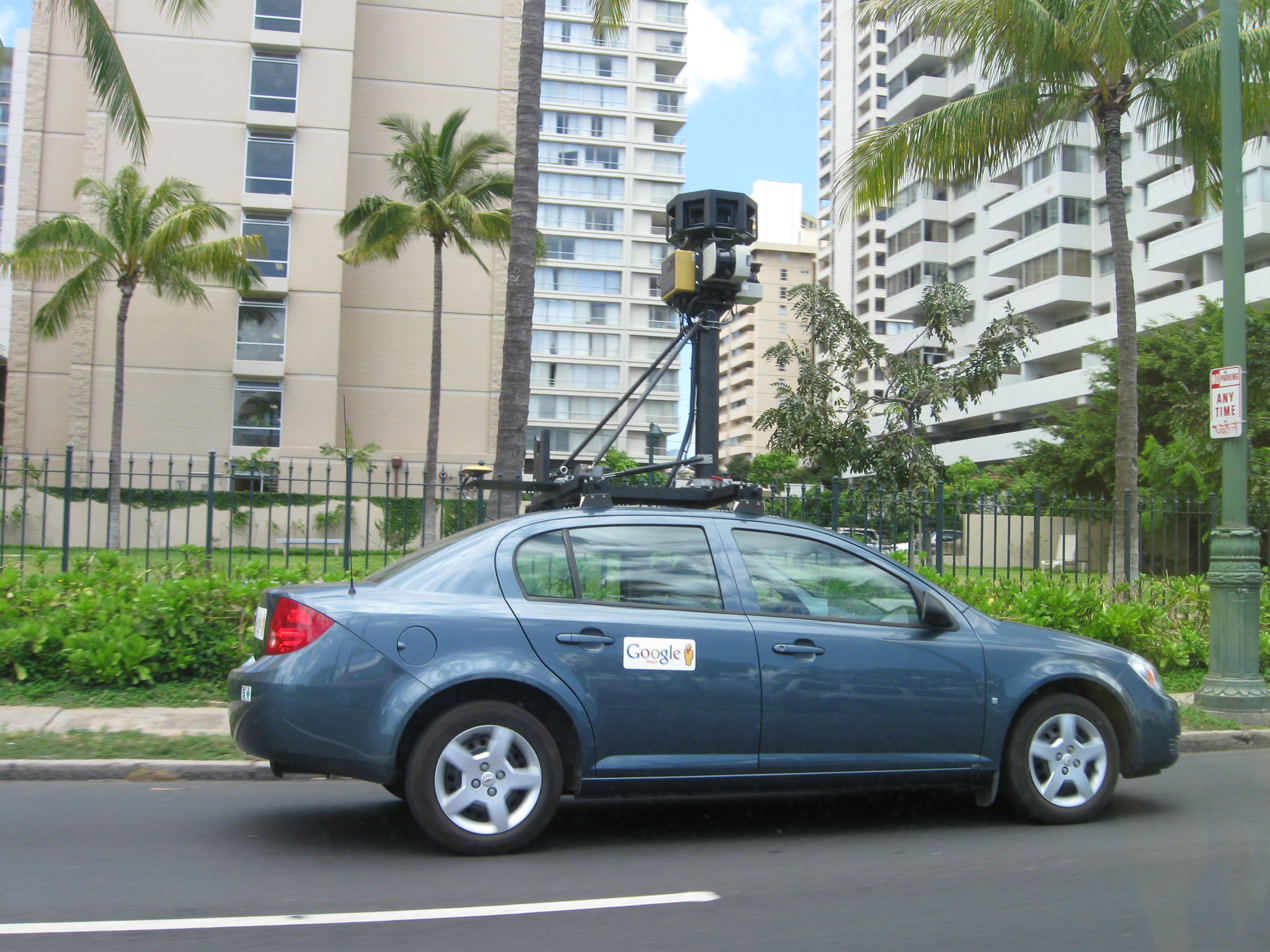
Google Street View Car

Mobile mapping is the process of collecting geospatial data from a mobile vehicle, typically fitted with a range of GNSS, photogrammetric, radar, lidar or any number of remote sensing systems. Such systems are composed of an integrated array of time synchronised navigation sensors and imaging sensors mounted on a mobile platform. The primary output from such systems include GIS data, digital maps, and georeferenced images and video.

== History ==
The development of direct reading georeferencing technologies opened the way for mobile mapping systems. GPS and Inertial Navigation Systems, have allowed rapid and accurate determination of position and attitude of remote sensing equipment, effectively leading to direct mapping of features of interest without the need for complex post-processing of observed data.

== Applications ==
=== Aerial mobile mapping ===
Traditional techniques of geo-referencing aerial photography, ground profiling radar, or Lidar are prohibitively expensive, particularly in inaccessible areas, or where the type of data collected makes interpretation of individual features difficult. Image direct georeferencing, simplifies the mapping control for large scale mapping tasks.

=== Emergency response planning ===
Mobile mapping systems allow rapid collection of data to allow accurate assessment of conditions on the ground.

=== Internet applications ===
Internet, and mobile device users, are increasingly utilising geo-spatial information, either in the form of mapping, or geo-referenced imaging. Google, Microsoft, and Yahoo have adapted both aerial photographs and satellite images to develop online mapping systems. Street View type images are also an increasing market.

Location aware PDA systems rely on geo-referenced features collated from mobile mapping sources.

=== Road mapping and highway facility management ===
GPS combined with digital camera systems allow rapid update of road maps. The same system can be utilised to carry out efficient road condition surveys, and facilities management. Laser scanning technologies, applied in the mobile mapping sense, allow full 3D data collection of slope, bankings, etc.

=== Road Inventory and Asset Management ===
Mobile LiDAR with a digital imaging system is being used to gather data which after post-processing generates strip plan, horizontal and vertical profile, all other asset within and beyond ROW including abutting land use and deficient geometry. This also calls for riding quality of pavement, Existing Traffic Characteristics and capacity of the corridor, Speed-flow-density analysis, Road Safety Review of the Corridor, Junction, and median opening, Facilities for commercial vehicles. Thus all data being used to form a performance matrix help identifying the gaps in corridor efficiency for prioritization of interventions to improve corridor efficiency.

=== Digital Twins applications ===
Mobile mapping combined with indoor mapping are being used in creation of digital twins. These digital twins can be a single building or an entire city or country. Several mobile mapping companies, known as "Maker of Digital Twins" are embarking on capturing the digital twins market amid the growing trend among organizations and governments that are adopting digital twins for Internet of Things and Artificial Intelligence applications within the Industrial Revolution 4.0 framework.
