= Surface micromachining =

Surface micromachining builds microstructures by deposition and etching structural layers over a substrate. This is different from Bulk micromachining, in which a silicon substrate wafer is selectively etched to produce structures.

== Layers ==
Generally, polysilicon is used as one of the substrate layers while silicon dioxide is used as a sacrificial layer. The sacrificial layer is removed or etched out to create any necessary void in the thickness direction. Added layers tend to vary in size from 2-5 micrometres. The main advantage of this machining process is the ability to build electronic and mechanical components (functions) on the same substrate. Surface micro-machined components are smaller compared to their bulk micro-machined counterparts.

As the structures are built on top of the substrate and not inside it, the substrate's properties are not as important as in bulk micro-machining. Expensive silicon wafers can be replaced by cheaper substrates, such as glass or plastic. The size of the substrates may be larger than a silicon wafer, and surface micro-machining is used to produce thin-film transistors on large area glass substrates for flat panel displays. This technology can also be used for the manufacture of thin film solar cells, which can be deposited on glass, polyethylene terepthalate substrates or other non-rigid materials.

== Fabrication process ==
Micro-machining starts with a silicon wafer or other substrate upon which new layers are grown. These layers are selectively etched by photo-lithography; either a wet etch involving an acid, or a dry etch involving an ionized gas (or plasma). Dry etching can combine chemical etching with physical etching or ion bombardment. Surface micro-machining involves as many layers as are needed with a different mask (producing a different pattern) on each layer. Modern integrated circuit fabrication uses this technique and can use as many as 100 layers. Micro-machining is a younger technology and usually uses no more than 5 or 6 layers. Surface micro-machining uses developed technology (although sometimes not enough for demanding applications) which is easily repeatable for volume production.

=== Sacrificial layers ===
A sacrificial layer is used to build complicated components, such as movable parts. For example, a suspended cantilever can be built by depositing and structuring a sacrificial layer, which is then selectively removed at the locations where the future beams must be attached to the substrate (i.e. the anchor points). A structural layer is then deposited on top of the polymer and structured to define the beams. Finally, the sacrificial layer is removed to release the beams, using a selective etch process that does not damage the structural layer.

Many combinations of structural and sacrificial layers are possible. The combination chosen depends on the process. For example, it is important for the structural layer not to be damaged by the process used to remove the sacrificial layer.

== Examples ==
Surface Micro-machining can be seen in action in the following MEMS (Microelectromechanical) products:

- Surface Micro-machined accelerometers
- 3D Flexible Multichannel Neural Probe array
- Nanoelectromechanical relays

== See also ==
- Bulk micromachining
- Magnetic nanoparticles
- MEMS
- Semiconductor device fabrication
