= Bulk micromachining =

Process used to produce micromachinery or microelectromechanical systems

Bulk micromachining is a process used to produce micromachinery or microelectromechanical systems (MEMS).

Unlike surface micromachining, which uses a succession of thin film deposition and selective etching, bulk micromachining defines structures by selectively etching inside a substrate. Whereas surface micromachining creates structures on top of a substrate, bulk micromachining produces structures inside a substrate.

Usually, silicon wafers are used as substrates for bulk micromachining, as they can be anisotropically wet etched, forming highly regular structures. Wet etching typically uses alkaline liquid solvents, such as potassium hydroxide (KOH) or tetramethylammonium hydroxide (TMAH) to dissolve silicon which has been left exposed by the photolithography masking step. These alkali solvents dissolve the silicon in a highly anisotropic way, with some crystallographic orientations dissolving up to 1000 times faster than others. Such an approach is often used with very specific crystallographic orientations in the raw silicon to produce V-shaped grooves. The surface of these grooves can be atomically smooth if the etch is carried out correctly, and the dimensions and angles can be precisely defined. Pressure sensors are usually created by bulk micromachining technique.

Bulk micromachining starts with a silicon wafer or other substrate which is selectively etched, using photolithography to transfer a pattern from a mask to the surface. Like surface micromachining, bulk micromachining can be performed with wet or dry etches, although the most common etch in silicon is the anisotropic wet etch. This etch takes advantage of the fact that silicon has a crystal structure, which means its atoms are all arranged periodically in lines and planes. Certain planes have weaker bonds and are more susceptible to etching. The etch results in pits that have angled walls, with the angle being a function of the crystal orientation of the substrate. This type of etching is inexpensive and is generally used in early, low-budget research.

== See also ==
- Deep reactive-ion etching
