= Micromirror device =

Micromirror devices are devices based on microscopically small mirrors. The mirrors are microelectromechanical systems (MEMS), which means that their states are controlled by applying a voltage between the two electrodes around the mirror arrays. Digital micromirror devices are used in video projectors and optics and micromirror devices for light deflection and control.

== Digital micromirror devices ==
Digital micromirror devices (DMD) were invented by Texas Instruments in 1987 and are the core of the DLP technology used for video projection. The mirrors are arranged in a matrix and have two states, "on" or "off" (digital). In the on state, light from the projector bulb is reflected into the lens making the pixel appear bright on the screen. In the off state, the light is directed elsewhere (usually onto a heatsink), making the pixel appear dark. Colours could be produced by various technologies like different light sources or gratings.

== Light deflection and control ==
The mirrors could not only be switched between two states, their rotation is in fact continuous. This could be used for controlling the intensity and direction of incident light. One future application is controlling the light in buildings, based on micromirrors between the two panes of insulated glazing. The power and direction of the incident light is determined by the mirrors state, which itself is controlled electrostatically.

== MEMS scanning micromirror ==
A MEMS scanning micromirror consists of a silicon device with a millimeter-scale mirror at the center. The mirror is typically connected to flexures that allow it to oscillate on a single axis or biaxially, to project or capture light.
