= Masters of Scale =

Business podcast

- Genre: Business
- Format: Documentary storytelling
- Country of origin: United States
- Language: English

Creative team
- Created by: June Cohen, Deron Triff

Cast and voices
- Hosted by: Reid Hoffman

Production
- Length: 30-45 minutes

Publication
- No. of seasons: 13 (as of May 30, 2023)
- No. of episodes: 250+
- Original release: May 3, 2017
- Provider: WaitWhat
- Updates: Weekly

Related
- Website: mastersofscale.com

Masters of Scale is a business podcast and media brand owned and produced by WaitWhat, the media company founded and led by former TED executives June Cohen and Deron Triff. In 2017, Masters of Scale launched as a business and leadership podcast occasionally hosted by Reid Hoffman, the co-founder of LinkedIn and partner at Greylock Partners. Masters of Scale aims to “democratize entrepreneurship” and has since extended into multiple podcasts, a learning app (Masters of Scale Courses), a book., and events, including the Masters of Scale Summit.

Podcast guests have included President Barack Obama, Airbnb co-founder and CEO Brian Chesky, Netflix co-founder Reed Hastings, Uber CEO Dara Khosrowshahi, Huffington Post & Thrive Global founder Arianna Huffington, and Ariel Investments co-CEO Mellody Hobson.

== History ==
Executive producers Deron Triff and June Cohen approached Reid Hoffman with the idea for the podcast, pitching it as a way of "sharing his ideas on scale in a way that could, well, scale." The first episode of Masters of Scale, featuring Airbnb CEO and cofounder Brian Chesky, aired on May 3, 2017.

In 2018, Masters of Scale was the first American media program to commit to a 50/50 gender balance for guests. Hoffman told Quartz: "Silicon Valley prides itself on being a meritocracy, but the data shows it's not. [Masters of Scale] launched with and maintained our commitment to a 50/50 gender balance of guests on each season. It's important to not just talk about this topic, but to take action ... set an example."

In March 2020, the team behind Masters of Scale launched a spinoff podcast, Masters of Scale: Rapid Response, on the Masters of Scale feed, to cover the impact of the COVID-19 pandemic on the business community. Hosted by Bob Safian, former Editor of Fast Company, the series has expanded beyond covering the pandemic, offering guidance from business leaders making decisions in turbulent situations. These podcast episodes tackle such issues as managing through crisis, the challenges of rebuilding, and changes to leadership.

In 2021, the Masters of Scale Courses app launched. The courses are rooted in the experience and insights of Reid and well-known entrepreneurs and leaders. Also in 2021, the Masters of Scale Complete Interviews became available exclusively to members in the app.

In September 2021, the Masters of Scale book was published.

In October 2022, the inaugural Masters of Scale Summit was held in San Francisco, California.

== Podcasts ==
Each classic episode of Masters of Scale is rooted in one of host Reid Hoffman's counterintuitive theories on how companies scale. Over the course of each episode, guests share their scale journey alongside insights and additional analysis from Hoffman that support the theory statement. Each episode is scored with original sound design.

A typical episode of Masters of Scale features the scale story of a founder or co-founders. The story is further contextualized through additional cameo guests. These cameo guests come from a wide spectrum of backgrounds, and have included Nobel Prize-winning economist Daniel Kahneman, Hall of Fame sportscaster Dick Stockton, National Geographic explorer Andrés Ruzo and Olympic runner Natasha Hastings.

Masters of Scale: Rapid Response episodes track real-time insights from business leaders who are navigating fast-changing situations, such as global health crises, political unrest, and economic uncertainty. In each episode, host Bob Safian, editor at large of Masters of Scale and the former Editor of Fast Company, interviews a guest with extensive experience and insights related to the topic at hand. Episodes have featured guests such as award-winning chef José Andrés, Las Vegas Raiders' President Sandra Douglass Morgan, Delta CEO Ed Bastian, Leadership Now Project's founder and CEO Daniella Ballou-Aares and Moviepass founder Stacy Spikes.

== Masters of Scale Episodes ==
Season 1
Episode	Title	Airdate
1	"Do Things That Don't Scale" with Brian Chesky of Airbnb	5/3/2017
2	"Raise More Money Than You Need" with Mariam Naficy of Minted	5/10/2017
3	"Learn From Every "No"" with Tristan Walker of Walker & Co.	5/17/2017
4	"Imperfect Is Perfect" with Mark Zuckerberg of Meta	5/24/2017
5	"Lead, Lead Again" with Sheryl Sandberg of Meta	5/31/2017
6	"Innovation Is Managed Chaos" with Eric Schmidt of Google & Schmidt Futures	6/7/2017
7	"Your Plan B Needs A Plan B" with Nancy Lublin of Crisis Text Line	6/14/2017
8	"Why Culture Matters" with Reed Hastings of Netflix	6/28/2017
9	"What's The Next Silicon Valley?" with Linda Rottenberg of Endeavor	7/12/2017
10	"Let Fires Burn" with Selina Tobaccowala of Gixo, Evite, & SurveyMonkey	7/19/2017

Season 2
Episode	Title	Airdate
11	"Escape the Competition" with Peter Thiel of PayPal	11/8/2017
12	"Look For The Ideas That Come At You Sideways" with Diane Greene of Google and Vmware	11/10/2017
13	"The Big Pivot" with Stewart Butterfield of Slack Technologies	11/15/2017
14	"The Infinite Learner (Part 1)" with Barry Diller of IAC	12/6/2017
15	"Learn to Unlearn (Part 2)" with Barry Diller of IAC	12/13/2017
16	"Build a More Human Internet" with Caterina Fake of Flickr and Yes Ventures	1/24/2018
17	"Customer Love is All You Need" with Sam Altman of OpenAI & Y Combinator	1/31/2018
18	"How To Build Your Company To Last" John Elkann of Fiat	2/7/2018
19	"How To Price Your Product To Scale" with Payal Kadakia of ClassPass	2/14/2018
20	"Never Underestimate Your First Idea" with Ev Williams of Medium and Twitter	2/21/2018
21	"How To Do Good And Do Good Business " with Howard Schultz of Starbucks	3/7/2018
22	"How to Find Your Big Idea" with Sara Blakely of Spanx	3/21/2018

Season 3
Episode	Title	Airdate
23	"Keep Humans In the Equation" with Stacy Brown-Philpot of TaskRabbit	7/11/2018
24	"How to Kill Your Bad Ideas" with Mark Pincus of Zynga	7/25/2018
25	"How to Make the Star Employees You Need" with Marissa Mayer of Yahoo, Google, and Lumi Labs	8/8/2018
26	"Keep it Simple While Scaling Big" with Kevin Systrom of Instagram	9/6/2018
27	"How to Build Trust Fast" with Daniel Ek of Spotify	9/19/2018
28	"What Great Founders Do At Night" with Arianna Huffington of Thrive Global	10/3/2018
29	"When to Ignore Conventional Wisdom" with Danny Meyer of Shake Shack & Union Square Hospitality Group	10/22/2018
30	"The Elusive Formula for Great Hiring" with Aneel Bhusri of Workday	11/5/2018
31	"The Millennial Episode" with Brit Morin of Brit + Co	11/19/2018
32	"To Scale, You Must Master The Art of Storytelling" with Scott Harrison of charity: water	12/18/2018
33	"Let Your Customers Be Your Scouts" with Julia Hartz of Eventbrite	1/8/2019
34	"Make Everyone A Hero: The Reid Hoffman Story (Part 1)" with Reid Hoffman of Greylock Partners	1/22/2019

Season 4
Episode	Title	Airdate
35	"Make Everyone A Hero: The Reid Hoffman Story (Part 2)" with Reid Hoffman of Greylock Partners	2/26/2019
36	"Check your Blindspot" with Sallie Krawcheck of Ellevest	3/12/2019
37	"Take Bigger Risks" with Shellye Archambeau of Nordstrom & MetricStream	3/26/2019
38	"Open or Closed? The Answer is Both" with Joi Ito of The Chiba Institute of Technology	4/30/2019
39	"The Case for Bootstrapping" with Ben Chestnut of Mailchimp	5/21/2019
40	"Bringing A Culture Back From The Brink" with Dara Khosrowshahi of Uber	6/5/2019
41	"Entrepreneurship as a Second Act" with Gwyneth Paltrow of Goop	7/2/2019
42	"Small Changes With Big Impact" with Whitney Wolfe Herd of Bumble	7/18/2019
43	"Embrace the Gatekeepers" Anne Wojcicki of 23andMe	8/1/2019
44	"Take On Goliath — And Win" with Drew Houston of Dropbox	9/5/2019
45	"LIVE! Patience or Speed? Both" with Tory Burch of Tory Burch LLC	10/17/2019

Season 5
Episode	Title	Airdate
46	"Make it Epic" with will.i.am of The Black Eyed Peas	10/31/2019
47	"How to Accelerate History (Part 1)" with Bill Gates of Bill & Melinda Gates Foundation	11/7/2019
48	"How to Set the Drumbeat" with Jeff Weiner of LinkedIn	11/15/2019
49	"How to Embrace Conflict" with Ray Dalio of Bridgewater Associates	11/26/2019
50	"LIVE! Find Your Trojan Horse" with Robert F. Smith of Vista Equity Partners	12/5/2019
51	"How to Solve an Impossible Challenge" with Megan Smith former Chief Technology Officer of the United States	12/13/2019
52	"The Biggest Success Story You Haven't Heard (Part 2)" with Bill Gates of Bill & Melinda Gates Foundation	12/20/2019
53	"What's the Hidden Business Behind Your Business?" with Jennifer Hyman of Rent the Runway	1/9/2020
54	"When to Zoom In, When to Zoom Out" with Josh Silverman of Etsy	1/23/2020
55	"Be a Platform" with Tobi Lütke of Shopify	2/13/2020
56	"How to Start a Revolution" with Wences Casares of Xapo	2/27/2020

Season 6
Episode	Title	Airdate
57	"How to Unite a Team (Part 1)" with Angela Ahrendts of Apple & Burberry	5/12/2020
58	"How to Unite a Team (Part 2)" with Angela Ahrendts of Apple & Burberry	5/19/2020
59	"A Masterclass in Crowdsourcing" Luis von Ahn of Duolingo	5/26/2020
60	"Build. Measure. Learn." with Eric Ries, author of "The Lean Startup"	6/16/2020
61	"The Power of Small Goals" with Stephen Colbert and Charles Best of DonorsChoose	6/30/2020
62	"The 4 Core Principles of Crisis Management" with Ellen Kullman formally of Carbon and DuPont	7/7/2020
63	"Be a Painkiller AND a Vitamin" with Clara Shih of Hearsay Social	7/28/2020
64	"Why Your Company Needs New Rituals" with Shishir Mehrotra of YouTube and Coda	8/18/2020
65	"How to Turn Skeptics into Fans" with John Foley of Peloton	8/25/2020

Season 7
Episode	Title	Airdate
66	"How to Build Authentic Connection at Scale" with Trevor McFedries & Lil Miquela of Brud	9/29/2020
67	"How to Find – and Keep – True North" with Susan Wojcicki of YouTube	10/6/2020
68	"To Scale, Find the Right Values" with Jimmy Wales of Wikipedia	10/13/2020
69	"The Empathy Flywheel" with Sarah Friar of Nextdoor	10/20/2020
70	"How to Sell Without Selling" with Phil Knight of Nike	11/10/2020
71	"How to Find Hidden Value that Others Miss" with Franklin Leonard of The Black List	11/17/2020
72	"Building Bridges to Scale" with Daniel Lubetzky of Kind	12/1/2020
73	"The Secret Power of Onboarding" with Melanie Perkins of Canva	12/8/2020
74	"How to Master Your Emotion" with Sam Harris of Making Sense	1/26/2021
75	"How to be the Steward of Your Idea" with Rana el Kaliouby of Smart Eye & Affectiva	2/2/2021

Season 8
Episode	Title	Airdate
76	"The Secret to Big Leaps" with Sir Richard Branson of Virgin Group	2/23/2021
77	"How Acquisitions Become an Ecosystem (Part 1)" with Bob Iger of Disney	3/2/2021
78	"Personal Brand Power" with Tyra Banks of Bankable Productions	3/9/2021
79	"How Acquisitions Become an Ecosystem (Part 2)" with Bob Iger of Disney	3/23/2021
80	"What Investors Really Look For" with Mark Cuban of Shark Tank	3/30/2021
81	"How to Teach Your Customer" with Ethan Brown of Beyond Meat	4/5/2021
82	"Frustration is Your Friend" with Adi Tatarko of Houzz	4/20/2021
83	"When the Moment Chooses You (Part 1)" with President Barack Obama	5/11/2021
84	"How to Adapt to Changing Rules (Part 2)" with President Barack Obama	5/18/2021
85	"How Mentorship Provides an Edge" with Alex Rodriquez of A-Rod Corp	5/25/2021
86	"Build the Right Flywheel" with Wendy Kopp of Teach for America and Teach for All	6/8/2021
87	"Make Room for Magic" with J.J. Abrams of Bad Robot Productions	6/15/2021
88	"Asking the Uncomfortable Questions" with Michael Seibel of Y Combinator	6/29/2021
89	"How to Accelerate Expertise" with Mellody Hobson of Ariel Investments and Starbucks	7/6/2021
90	"The Beauty of Emphasizing the Obvious" with Katia Beauchamp of Birchbox	7/27/2021

Season 9
Episode	Title	Airdate
91	"Why We Need Re-Founders" with Satya Nadella of Microsoft	8/31/2021
92	"How Setbacks Create Momentum" with Robert Reffkin of Compass, Inc.	9/14/2021
93	"How to Unlock Your Team's Creative Potential" with Indra Nooyi of PepsiCo	9/28/2021
94	"No Data, No Scale" with Sheila Lirio Marcelo of Care.com	10/5/2021
95	"Make Your Customer the Star" with Jessica Alba of The Honest Company	10/12/2021
96	"Focus on the Scale that Your Customers Can't See" with Beth Ford of Land O'Lakes	11/9/2021
97	"Build a better board" with Mellody Hobson, Lisa Shalett, & Shishir Mehrotra	11/16/2021
98	"How Redefining Boundaries Drives Performance" with Paul Polman of Unilever	12/7/2021
99	"Leap Before You Look" with Marc Lore of Jet.com	1/11/2022
100	"Lessons That Matter Most: What We've Learned From 100 Episodes of Masters of Scale" with Brian Chesky, Tyra Banks, Angela Ahrendts, Sallie Krawcheck, & Franklin Leonard	1/15/2022
101	"Always Be Recruiting" with Paul English of Kayak	1/18/2022
102	"Don't Predict the Future. Create It" with Natalie Massenet of Net-a-Porter	2/1/2022

Season 10
Episode	Title	Airdate
103	"How to Harness Risk" with Stacey Abrams of The New Georgia Project	3/8/2022
104	"How to Partner Like a Shark (Part 1)" with Daymond John of FUBU and Shark Tank	3/15/2022
105	"How to Partner Like a Shark (Part 2)" with Daymond John of FUBU and Shark Tank	3/22/2022
106	"Chobani's Secret to Scale: Tap into Community" with Hamdi Ulukaya of Chobani	4/5/2022
107	"The Refounder Mindset (Part 1)" with Bill Ford of Ford	5/10/2022
108	"The Refounder Mindset (Part 2)" with Bill Ford of Ford	5/17/2022
109	"Extraordinary Leaps Need Solid Foundations (Part 1)" with Stéphane Bancel of Moderna	5/24/2022
110	"Extraordinary Leaps Need Solid Foundations (Part 2)" with Stéphane Bancel of Moderna	5/31/2022
112	"Improving Human Dignity is an Engine of Scale" with Phaedra Ellis-Lamkins of Promise	6/21/2022
113	"Break It ’til You Make It" with Michael Dell of Dell	6/28/2022
114	"Harness the Passion of Internal Factions" with Padmasree Warrior of Fable, Cisco, and Motorola	7/12/2022
115	"Drive Full-Speed at Opportunity" with Ajaz Ahmed of AKQA	7/19/2022

Season 11
Episode	Title	Airdate
116	"How to Take Creative Leaps — and Land Them" with Tony Fadell of Future Shape	8/16/2022
117	"The Wrongness Playbook (Part 1)" with Jack Conte of Patreon	8/30/2022
118	"The Wrongness Playbook (Part 2)" with Jack Conte of Patreon	9/6/2022
119	"Why Mission Matters More Than Products" with Saeju Jeong of Noom	9/27/2022
120	"Think Like an Intrapreneur" with Linda Yates of Mach49	10/11/2022
121	"Let Waypoints Guide You" with Chris Urmson of Aurora	11/1/2022
122	"Brand While You Build" with Neil Blumenthal & Dave Gilboa of Warby Parker	11/8/2022
123	"Build the Right Incentives" with Cindy Mi of VIPKid	12/6/2022
124	"The Co-Founder Effect" with Stephen Hawthornthwaite & Roth Martin of Rothy's	12/20/2022

Season 12
Episode	Title	Airdate
125	"The Essential Playbooks — and When to Use Them" with John Chambers of Cisco	1/10/2023
126	"When to Seek Advice and When to Ignore It" with Alexa von Tobel of LearnVest and Inspired Capital	1/31/2023
127	"Dare to Make Unexpected Moves" with David Droga of Droga5 and Accenture Song, a division of Accenture	2/28/2023

Season 13
Episode	Title	Airdate
128	"Harness Fear to Drive Innovation (Part 1)" with Jimmy Iovine of Interscope Records	5/31/2023
129	"Harness Fear to Drive Innovation (Part 2)" with Jimmy Iovine of Interscope Records	6/6/2023
130	"Better Metrics for Better Culture (Part 1) with Mitch Kapor and Dr. Freada Kapor Klein of Kapor Capital	6/20/2023
131	"Better Metrics for Better Culture (Part 2) with Mitch Kapor and Dr. Freada Kapor Klein of Kapor Capital	6/27/2023
132	"Build Your Culture Like a Product" with Dharmesh Shah of HubSpot	7/11/2023
133	"Re-skill for AI, w/PwC's Tim Ryan"	07/13/2023
134	"Prepare for where AI is headed next, w/Reid Hoffman & Bob Safian"	07/18/2023
135	"Focus on the scale that your customers can't see, w/Land O'Lakes CEO Beth Ford"	07/25/2023
136	"Ron Howard: Evolve your vision"	08/15/2023
137	"Brian Grazer: Scale your curiosity"	08/29/2023
138	"Eileen Fisher: Keep it simple to make it timeless"	09/6/2023

2025 Season
No.	Title	Guest(s)	Original release date
551	"The science of fresh starts"	Katy Milkman	2 January 2025
552	"Kicking off 2025: five bold AI predictions"	Dr Rana el Kaliouby	7 January 2025
553	"Redefining work–life balance"	Neha Ruch (Mother Untitled)	21 January 2025
554	"Scaling solutions for the climate crisis"	Vinod Khosla	23 January 2025
555	"Reid Hoffman on AI ‘Super-agency’"	Reid Hoffman	28 January 2025
556	"Inclusive leadership remix"	Emma Grede, Mellody Hobson, Angela Ahrendts	30 January 2025
557	"Putting Starbucks back on top"	Brian Niccol	4 February 2025
558	"Disrupting hair-color"	Amy Errett (Madison Reed)	6 February 2025
559	"Pivot crossover: Hoffman, Swisher & Galloway on the AI news cycle"	Kara Swisher, Scott Galloway, Reid Hoffman	7 February 2025
560	"From Nike to Bud Light to Tubi: Super Bowl LIX ad lessons"	Dara Treseder	11 February 2025
561	"Building a network of mentors"	Ryan Williams (Cadre)	13 February 2025
562	"Can Rivian avoid the EV speed bumps?"	RJ Scaringe	18 February 2025
563	"A more compassionate capitalism"	Davis Smith (Cotopaxi)	20 February 2025
564	"Egg prices, avian flu & golden yolks"	Russell Diez-Canseco (Vital Farms)	25 February 2025
565	"Leveraging AI at Adobe"	Shantanu Narayen	27 February 2025
566	"Oscars 2025: what Hollywood’s future looks like"	Janice Min (The Ankler)	4 March 2025
567	"How Anastasia Soare built a beauty empire"	Anastasia Soare	6 March 2025
568	"Non-profits vs Trump’s funding cuts"	Stacy Palmer (Chronicle of Philanthropy)	11 March 2025
569	"Solving start-up puzzles"	Christina Cacioppo (Vanta)	13 March 2025
570	"From ‘Trump bump’ to ‘Trump slump’"	Sarah Levy (Betterment)	18 March 2025
571	"Live from SXSW: the messy path to success"	Mike & Kass Lazerow	20 March 2025
572	"Public radio vs DOGE"	Katherine Maher (NPR)	25 March 2025
573	"Climate-change ‘codeswitching’ for business"	Julia Collins (Planet FWD)	27 March 2025
574	"From data-breach scandal to AI darling"	Sridhar Ramaswamy (Snowflake)	1 April 2025
575	"Creating cancer cures: Reid Hoffman’s new venture"	Reid Hoffman	3 April 2025
576	"When big law firms won’t defend themselves"	Rachel Cohen	8 April 2025
577	"The business case for wellness"	Cesar Carvalho (Wellhub)	10 April 2025
578	"Finding opportunity in volatility"	Scott Strazik (GE Vernova)	15 April 2025
579	"Why happier vets mean healthier pets"	Steven Eidelman (Modern Animal)	17 April 2025
580	"José Andrés: leadership lessons from the kitchen"	José Andrés	22 April 2025
581	"Replay: Frustration is your friend"	Adi Tatarko	24 April 2025
582	"Marc Lore wants an AI super-app for meals"	Marc Lore	29 April 2025
583	"Disrupting healthcare hiring"	Dr Iman Abuzeid (Incredible Health)	1 May 2025
584	"Musk & DOGE: inside 100 days of chaos"	Katie Drummond (Wired)	6 May 2025
585	"A $630 million first-time founder exit"	Niki Christoff	8 May 2025
586	"Banishing burnout – replay"	Arianna Huffington	10 May 2025
587	"One trait every leader needs today"	Gen. Stanley McChrystal	13 May 2025
588	"Why we keep failing to eradicate disease"	John Green	15 May 2025
589	"The enterprise AI revolution"	Aaron Levie (Box)	20 May 2025
590	"Esther Perel: better relationships at work"	Esther Perel	22 May 2025
591	"Olipop’s gutsy play to dethrone Coke & Pepsi"	Ben Goodwin	27 May 2025
592	"Why great storytellers thrive in business"	Frank Patterson (Trilith Studios)	29 May 2025
593	"Reid Hoffman on AI’s environmental risks"	Reid Hoffman	31 May 2025
594	"Sports biz at a crossroads"	Sarah Spain	3 June 2025
595	"Simon Sinek on identifying great leaders"	Simon Sinek	5 June 2025
596	"Crypto’s future after Trump"	Laura Shin	10 June 2025
597	"Is Dude Perfect the next Disney?"	Andrew Yaffe	12 June 2025
598	"Advice for grads in the age of AI"	Multiple guests	14 June 2025
599	"Trump vs Musk, Zuckerberg’s ‘super-intelligence’ & more"	Reid Hoffman	17 June 2025
600	"How to raise $172 million for the under-invested"	Stacy Brown-Philpot	19 June 2025
601	"Empowering frontline leaders in war zones"	Dr Samantha Nutt (War Child)	24 June 2025
602	"Building a $1.5 billion real-estate empire"	Spencer Rascoff • Austin Allison	26 June 2025

== Masters of Scale: Rapid Response Episodes ==
Episode	Title	Airdate
1	"How all-remote teams work" with Matt Mulller of WordPress & Automattic	3/18/2020
2	"The wrenching decision to do layoffs" with Danny Meyer of Shake Shack & Union Square Hospitality Group	3/24/2020
3	"First be human: Thoughts on the crisis" with Reid Hoffman of Greylock Partners	3/26/2020
4	"Hourly workers are a hero class" with Tony Tjan of Cue Ball Capital	3/31/2020
5	"Crisis data is the story of our times" with Nancy Lublin of Crisis Text Line	4/2/2020
6	"Relief funding and crowdfunding in a crisis" with Karen Cahn of IFundWomen	4/4/2020
7	"Fast pivots for changing needs" with Charles Best of DonorsChoose	4/7/2020
8	"A playbook for when there's no playbook" with Ellen J. Kullman of Carbon	4/14/2020
9	"Crisis is pushing us back to our roots" with Brian Chesky of Airbnb	4/13/2020
10	"How to keep an essential business running" with John Zimmer of Lyft	4/16/2020
11	“A pandemic doesn't see money” with Stacy Brown-Philpot of TaskRabbit	4/18/2020
12	“I want to see retail survive this” with Brian Cornell of Target	4/20/2020
13	"Let go of geographic fencing and find the best team" with Wences Casares of Xapo Bank	4/22/2020
14	"Build government back – better" with Jen Pahika of US Digital	4/23/2020
15	"Neighbors are a frontline of support" with Sarah Friar of Nextdoor	4/24/2020
16	"Pet adoptions: Up. Delivery business: Up." with Sumit Singh of Chewy	4/25/2020
17	"A crisis leadership session" with General Stanley A. McChrystal	4/28/2020
18	"Inside Panera's pandemic pivot" with Niren Chaudhary of Panera Bread	4/30/2020
19	"On the frontlines of scale: hospitals" with Dr. David Skorton of the Association of American Medical Colleges	5/2/2020
20	"Food security in a pandemic" with Sara Menker of Gro Intelligence	5/5/2020
21	"Crisis lessons from inside the ER" with Dr. Bon Ku of Thomas Jefferson University Hospital	5/7/2020
22	"Operating in a fishbowl" with Scott O'Neil of the Philadelphia 76ers and New Jersey Devils	5/9/2020
23	"Future-proofing Verizon" with Hans Vestberg of Verizon Communications	5/16/2020
24	"Leading with your gut" with Julie Smolyansky of Lifeway Foods	5/21/2020
25	"How Warby Parker is making decisions in uncertainty" with Neil Blumenthal of Warby Parker	5/23/2020
26	"How 'startup DNA' helped One Medical respond to Covid" with Amir Rubin of One Medical	5/28/2020
27	"10 weeks later: How to revive restaurants" with Danny Meyer of Shake Shack & Union Square Hospitality Group	5/30/2020
28	"Record-high audience, record-low revenue" with Jonah Peretti of BuzzFeed	6/6/2020
29	"Going ventilator fast" with Mary Barra of General Motors	6/13/2020
30	"How business can engage against racism" with Shellye Archambeau of MetricStream and Nordstrom	6/19/2020
31	"Burning cash, accepting turbulence" with Ed Bastian of Delta Air Lines	6/27/2020
32	"A new playbook for new times" with Darren Walker of the Ford Foundation	7/2/2020
33	"What it will take for tech and Hollywood to be anti-racist" with Rashad Robinson of Color of Change	7/9/2020
34	"Inside PayPal's $530M plan to close the racial wealth gap" with Dan Schulman of PayPal	7/11/2020
35	"Building a bridge over troubled waters" with Dr. Mary Schmidt Campbell of Spelman College	7/18/2020
36	"What you can learn from how schools are pivoting" with Eva Moskowitz of Success Academy Charter Schools	9/8/2020
37	"Nothing matters but this" with Eric Schmidt of Google & Schmidt Futures	9/15/2020
38	"Healthy offices and the myth of remote-work productivity" with Diane Hoskins of Gensler	9/22/2020
39	"Your company is a citizen – it can act like one" with Baratunde Thurston of How to Citizen	10/1/2020
40	"The Covid test facts every CEO needs" with Rajiv Shah of the Rockefeller Foundation	10/8/2020
41	"Movie-theater drama has come to every business" with Shelli Taylor of Alamo Drafthouse Cinema	10/15/2020
42	"When your business disappears overnight" with Arne Sorenson of Marriott International	10/22/2020
43	"Small business – more stressed than ever" with Jeff Jones of H&R Block	11/2/2020
44	"Pandemic planning, phase two" with Dr. Bon Ku of Thomas Jefferson University Hospital	11/5/2020
45	"A virtual-first workplace" with Drew Houston of Dropbox	11/12/2020
46	"Why brands must take a stand" with Colleen DeCourcy of Wieden+Kennedy	11/19/2020
47	"Balancing data with gut feeling" with Joanna Geraghty of JetBlue	11/25/2020
48	"Loneliness at work" with Noreena Hertz of The Lonely Century	12/3/2020
49	"Why take on a turnaround" with Peggy Johnson of Magic Leap	12/10/2020
50	"Why Salesforce bought Slack" with Bret Taylor of Salesforce	12/17/2020
51	"What the pandemic has cost women" with Sallie Krawcheck of Ellevest	1/14/2021
52	"Ten months of pain and hope" with Danny Meyer of Shake Shack & Union Square Hospitality Group	1/21/2021
53	"Aggressive sustainability" with Lynn Jurich of Sunrun	1/28/2021
54	"Why we need to think again" with Adam Grant of the Wharton School of the University of Pennsylvania	2/4/2021
55	"Iterating under pressure" with Claire Babineaux-Fontenot of Feeding America	2/11/2021
56	"Public-private opportunities" with Mike Brown of the Defense Innovation Unit	2/16/2021
57	"Winning and losing" with Jerry Stackhouse of Vanderbilt University	2/18/2021
58	"Wartime leadership" with John Donahoe of Nike, Inc	2/25/2021
59	"A prescription for healthy growth" with Heather Hasson of FIGS	3/4/2021
60	"We died and were reborn" with Brian Chesky of Airbnb	3/16/2021
61	"The business of democracy" with Daniella Ballou-Aares of Leadership Now	3/25/2021
62	"The trampoline effect" with Alex Lieberman of Morning Brew	4/1/2021
63	"Turbulence, recovery and risk" with Ed Bastian of Delta Air Lines	4/8/2021
64	"Can bankruptcy save movie theaters?" with Shelli Taylor of Alamo Drafthouse Cinemas	4/15/2021
65	"A pandemic is not a business model" with Linda Findley of Blue Apron	4/22/2021
66	"A crucible moment" with Apoorva Mehta of Instacart	4/29/2021
67	"Surviving a close shave" with Andy Katz-Mayfield of Harry's	5/6/2021
68	"Inside Google's Pandemic Safety Squad" with Dr. Karen DeSalvo of Google	5/13/2021
69	"Why real estate matters more than ever" with Robert Reffkin of Compass, Inc	5/20/2021
70	"Upskilling and the war for talent" with Rachel Romer Carlson of Guild Education	5/27/2021
71	"The promise and peril of engineering biology" with Reshma Shetty of Ginkgo Bioworks	6/3/2021
72	"Fashioning a greener closet" with Jennifer Hyman of Rent the Runway	6/10/2021
73	"Why business must be a force for good" with Kenneth Chenault of General Catalyst Partners	6/17/2021
74	"Fighting through headwinds at Marriott" with Stephanie Linnartz of Marriott International	6/24/2021
75	"Tapping into generosity (via Bitcoin)" with Scott Harrison of charity:water	7/1/2021
76	"How BuzzFeed bounced back" with Jonah Peretti of BuzzFeed	7/8/2021
77	"Scaling a mission" with Sonal Shah of The Asian American Foundation	7/15/2021
78	"Inside J.Crew's purposeful pivot" with Libby Wadle of J. Crew	7/22/2021
79	"How Harley-Davidson set a foundation for the long term" with Jochen Zeitz of Harley-Davidson, Inc	7/29/2021
80	"How mission fuels risk-taking" with Francis deSouza of Illumina	8/19/2021
81	"How Electronic Arts grows a metaverse" with Andrew Wilson of Electronic Arts	8/26/2021
82	"When you should require vaccinations" with Danny Meyer of Shake Shack & the Union Square Hospitality Group	9/2/2021
83	"When to build the company before the product" with Chris Urmson of Aurora Innovation	9/9/2021
84	"In hard times, the show must go on" with Bonnie Comley of BroadwayHD	9/16/2021
85	"How to lead for enduring impact" with Dr. Mary Schmidt Campbell of Spelman College	9/23/2021
86	"How to scale tech responsibly" with Sridhar Ramaswamy of Neeva	9/30/2021
87	"Urgent lessons from a cyberattack" with Sudhakar Ramakrishna of SolarWinds	10/7/2021
88	"Overcoming institutional hurdles" with Sarah Hirshland of the United States Olympic & Paralympic Committee	10/14/2021
89	"Launching a $500b startup" with Marc Lore of Jet.com	10/21/2021
90	"The truth about what we watch" with David Kenny of Nielsen Media Research	10/28/2021
91	"How Peloton keeps pushing through resistance" with John Foley	11/4/2021
92	"You should be running toward AI" with Eric Schmidt of Google & Schmidt Futures	11/11/2021
93	"How to turn intentions into action" with Aurora James of 15 Percent Pledge	11/18/2021
94	"Re-founding Instacart" with Fidji Simo of Instacart	12/2/2021
95	"How GoFundMe has facilitated $15 billion in giving" with Tim Cadogan of GoFundMe	12/9/2021
96	"How flexibility creates momentum" with Janet Hayes of Crate & Barrel	12/16/2021
97	"How to decarbonize your business" with John Doerr of Speed & Scale	1/13/2022
98	"Lessons of Omicron" with Sir Jeremy Farrar of Wellcome Trust	1/20/2022
99	"Be relentless – so your team can be fearless" with Alexis McGill Johnson of Planned Parenthood	1/27/2022
100	"Tapping a new generation of consumers" with Rachel Jacobson of Drone Racing League	2/3/2022
101	"Scaling when you're already at scale" with Cristiano Amon of Qualcomm	2/10/2022
102	"Be confident enough to show your vulnerability" with Kenneth Frazier of General Catalyst Partners'	2/17/2022
103	"Invest in first principles" with Sarah Levy of Betterment	2/24/2022
104	"Make mistakes to make progress" with Gerald Johnson of General Motors	3/3/2022
105	"On the ground in Ukraine" with Tjada D'Oyen McKenna of Mercy Corps	3/10/2022
106	"How global markets are reacting to Russia's war on Ukraine" with Sara Menker of Gro Intelligence	3/12/2022
107	“We have an all-out cyber war right now" with Bipul Sinha of Rubrik	3/14/2022
108	"The logistical challenge of supporting refugees" with Susy Schöneberg of Flexport	3/17/2022
109	"Transforming an idea into a movement overnight" with Tokunbo Koiki of Black Women for Black Lives	3/19/2022
110	"Putting an end to hustle culture" with Reshma Saujani of Pay Up	3/24/2022
111	"How Airbnb.org is housing Ukrainian refugees" with Joe Gebbia of Airbnb	3/31/2022
112	"Inside 'the most radical supply chain shift since World War II'" with Jennifer Bisceglie of Interos	4/2/2022
113	"Supporting Ukraine's tech workers" with Eric Friedrichsen of Emburse	4/7/2022
114	"Lessons from an entrepreneur in Ukraine" with Alyona Mysko of Fuelfinance	4/14/2022
115	"How Chief became a phenomenon" with Carolyn Childers of Chief	4/21/2022
116	"Rebooting global crisis response" with Gayle Smith of One Campaign	4/30/2022
117	"Protecting against the next bio threat" with Charity Dean of The Public Health Company	5/5/2022
118	"Stay scrappy, deliver fast" with Yakir Gola of Gopuff	5/12/2022
119	"Inside a $2.4 billion bet on talent" with Tim Ryan of PwC	5/19/2022
120	"A global benefit concert for Ukraine" with Victoria Yampolksy of World United for Ukraine	5/26/2022
121	"Don't wait for the system, build it!" with Kathryn Finney of Genius Guild	6/9/2022
122	"Redesigning work in a crisis" with Hayden Brown of Upwork	6/16/2022
123	"Solar energy's time to shine" with Mary Powell of Sunrun	6/25/2022
124	"From ‘delusion’ to criminal justice revolution" with Zo Orchingwa of Ameelio	6/30/2022
125	"Volunteer for impact" with Micheal Smith of AmeriCorps	7/7/2022
126	"Waging a $1.4 trillion food fight" with Peter McGuinness of Impossible Foods	7/14/2022
127	"Turning tears to action" with Alexis McGill of Planned Parenthood	7/21/2022
128	"What the crypto crash teaches us all" with Micheal Gronager of Chainalysis	7/28/2022
129	"Playing offense in adversity" with Brian Cornell of Target Corporation	8/11/2022
130	"Amazon's plan to be big, green, and beloved" with Adam Selipsky of Amazon Web Services	8/25/2022
131	"Holding business accountable from Meta to McDonald" with Rashad Robinson of Color of Change	9/1/2022
132	"How we served 150 million meals in Ukraine" with Jośe Andrés of World Central Kitchen	9/8/2022
133	"Charging toward a clean energy future" with Cathy Zoi of EVgo	9/15/2022
134	"Flipping your strategy in a volatile market" with Susan Daimler of Zillow	9/22/2022
135	"How Covid lessons get tested by inflation" with Danny Meyer of Shake Shack & Union Square Hospitality Group	9/29/2022
136	"Mastering the hybrid workplace" with Priya Parker of The Art of the Gathering	10/6/2022
137	"Rally a team in turmoil" with Sandra Douglass Morgan of the Las Vegas Raiders	10/13/2022
138	"Why design matters more than ever" with Mauro Porcini of PepsiCo	11/3/2022
139	"Expand your definition of leadership" with Julia Boorstin of CNBC	11/10/2022
140	"Don't be a unicorn, be a dragon" with Maëlle Gavet of Techstars	11/17/2022
141	"Risking an iconic brand — and $40b — in a race to go all-electric" with Ola Källenius of Mercedes-Benz	12/2/2022
142	"How Main Street retailers are out-pivoting big-box giant" with Max Rhodes of Faire	12/8/2022
143	"The rise of the 'wisdom worker'" with Chip Conley of the Modern Elder Academy	12/15/2022
144	"How to cultivate a new industry" with Dr. Uma Valeti of Upside Foods	1/12/2023
145	"Finding untapped value in multicultural consumers" with Morgan DeBaun of Blavity	1/19/2023
146	"Stay versatile" with Calvin McDonald of Lululemon Athletica	1/26/2023
147	"Turning point for a climate-crisis solution" with Christoph Gebald of Climeworks	2/3/2023
148	"Betting on the Super Bowl" with Amy Howe of FanDuel	2/9/2023
149	"Kickstart your users from passive to passionate" with Everette Taylor of Kickstarter	2/16/2023
150	"Finding windows of opportunity" with Ed Bastian of Delta Air Lines	2/23/2023
151	"Embrace tension" with Ginni Rometty of IBM	3/2/2023
152	"Compassion in the face of crisis" with Tjada D'Oyen McKenna of Mercy Corps	3/9/2023
153	"Live with urgency" with Bozoma Saint John	3/16/2023
154	"Lessons from the demise of BuzzFeed News" with Jonah Peretti of BuzzFeed	5/4/2023
155	"Using failure as a launchpad" with Stacy Spikes of MoviePass	5/23/2023
156	"Make AI your co-pilot" with John Maeda of Microsoft	6/8/2023
157	"How to inject AI into your core business" with Rana el Kaliouby of Smart Eye	6/22/2023
158	"Re-skill for AI" with Tim Ryan of PwC	7/13/2023

== App ==
The Masters of Scale Courses app features exclusive courses, podcast episodes, and bonus content for subscribed members.

The Masters of Scale courses are short-form audio courses aimed at building an "entrepreneurial mindset." According to the website, each course covers an overarching core business topic, e.g. branding, pivots, mission, and consists of multiple Daily Practices. All Daily Practices are approximately 10 minutes long and include relevant excerpts from an interview with an industry leader, along with new additional commentary and insights from Reid Hoffman. At the end of each Daily Practice, an Action Item is provided so that learners can apply what they learned from the course to their own work.

In 2022, the app received a Webby Award for Best Education & Reference App.

== Book ==
Released in September 2021, Masters of Scale: Surprising Truths from the World's Most Successful Entrepreneurs is based on the podcast and contains anecdotes and learnings gleaned from the hundred plus podcast interviews. The book aims to "tease out and distill the essential attributes of people who start and grow businesses." A review published by Business Insider notes that while translating from a podcast to book should lead to "unsatisfying" results, the book "manages to work" due to the "combined impact of the stories." It became a Wall Street Journal Bestseller in October 2021.

== Event ==
The inaugural Masters of Scale summit was held in San Francisco, California from October 18–20, 2022. The audience, who attended in person or via livestream, consisted of a wide range of companies in all stages of growth, leaders across industries, executives of non-profit and cultural organizations, investors, artists, and the media. Stage sessions centered on themes such as, the art of pivoting, technological revolutions, creative innovations, holistic wellness, humanity & culture, diversity & inclusion, and disruption, and “the discussions ranged from the power of psychedelics to the joys of rural life.” The sessions included interviews, presentations, and group conversations, as well as featured live performances by a variety of performing artists. Speakers included 15 Percent Pledge founder Aurora James, TikTok CEO Shou Zi Chew, Tyler Perry Studios founder and CEO Tyler Perry, Turning Red film director and Pixar animator Domee Shi, Microsoft co-founder and Bill & Melinda Gates Foundation CEO Bill Gates, and Imagine Entertainment co-founder Ron Howard.

== Awards ==
Masters of Scale has won or been nominated for many awards. The wins include the 2018 Webby Award for Best Business Podcast, the 2023 Signal Award for Best Commute Podcast and the 2022 Webby Award for Best Individual Episode, for the episode with President Barack Obama.

Awards
Award	Year	Category	Recipient	Result	Ref.
Webby	2023	Best Episode: Business	Rapid Response: Transforming an idea into a movement overnight, w/Black Women For Black Lives co-founder Tokunbo Koiki	Honoree	
Webby	2023	Best Episode: Business	Masters of Scale - Daymond John, Part 1: How to Partner Like a Shark	Won	
Signal Award	2023	Best Gateway Podcast - Individual Episodes	Chobani's Secret to Scale: Tap into Community, w/Founder and CEO Hamdi Ulukaya	Won	
Signal Award	2023	Most Innovative Audio Experience - Individual Episodes	J. J. Abrams: Make Room for Magic	Won	
Signal Award	2023	Best Editing - Individual Episodes	J. J. Abrams: Make Room for Magic	Won	
Signal Award	2023	Best Commute Podcast - Shows	Masters of Scale	Won	
Signal Award	2023	Best Commute Podcast - Individual Episodes	Tyra Banks: Personal Brand Power	Won	
Signal Award	2023	Best Episode: Creativity & Marketing	Daymond John, Part 1: How to Partner Like a Shark	Nominated	
Signal Award	2023	Best Episode: Self-Improvement & Self-Help	Improving human dignity is an engine of scale, w/Promise CEO Phaedra Ellis-Lamkins	Won	
Signal Award	2023	Best Episode: Writing	Stacey Abrams: How to Harness Risk	Won	
Signal Award	2023	Best Episode: Business	Stacey Abrams: How to Harness Risk	Won	
Signal Award	2023	Best Podcast Ad	Masters of Scale & Capital One: Mama Aunties Vegan Goodies	Won	
Signal Award	2023	Best Podcast Ad	Masters of Scale & Capital One Business: Aparna Sarin	Won	
Signal Award	2022	Best Technology Podcast	Masters of Scale	Won	
Webby	2022	Best App: Education & Reference	Masters of Scale Courses App	Nominated	
Webby	2022	Best User Experience: Education & Reference Apps	Masters of Scale Courses App	Nominated	
Webby	2022	Best App: Learning & Education	Masters of Scale Courses App	Honoree	
Webby	2022	Best Individual Episode - Overall	Masters of Scale Podcast Episode: President Barack Obama: When the moment chooses you, part 1	Won	
Webby	2022	Best News & Politics Podcast	Masters of Scale Podcast Episode: President Barack Obama: When the moment chooses you, part 1	Won	
Webby	2022	Podcasts - Best Individual Episode (Features)	Masters of Scale - How to Accelerate Expertise, with Mellody Hobson, Co-CEO of Ariel Investments, Chair of Starbucks	Honoree	
Webby	2022	Podcasts - Best Podcast Ad (Features)	Masters of Scale x Capital One: Village Market	Honoree	
Webby	2022	Best Education & Reference App	Masters of Scale Courses App	Nominated	
Ambies	2022	Best Business Podcast	Masters of Scale	Nominated	
Ambies	2021	Best Scriptwriting, Nonfiction	Masters of Scale	Won	
Webby	2021	Best Podcast: Business	Masters of Scale	Won	
Webby	2021	Podcasts - Best Podcast Ad (Features)	Hubspot - The Culture Code	Nominated	
Webby	2020	Best Podcast: Business	Masters of Scale	Nominated	
Webby	2020	Best Podcast: Live Recording	Masters of Scale	Nominated	
Webby	2019	Best Podcast: Business	Masters of Scale	Nominated	
Webby	2019	Best Podcast: Writing	Masters of Scale	Nominated	
Discover Pods Awards	2019	Business Podcast	Masters of Scale	Nominated	
Webby	2018	People's Voice Winner for Best Business Podcast	Masters of Scale	Won	
