= Charis Jones =

American entrepreneur and designer

Charis Jones (born October 31, 1982) is an American entrepreneur and designer. She is the CEO of Sassy Jones, a lifestyle and fashion brand. She is the mother of twin boys.

== Career ==
After attending Hampton University, Jones moved to Hampton, VA, where she worked in sales and marketing for Fortune 500 companies. In June 2013, she began her fashion brand Sassy Jones with accessories.

Jones is currently the chief designer and CEO of the company. She is part of the Tory Burch Fellowship class of 2020 and a recipient of Entrepreneur magazine's Top Company of the Year award. She also has an HSN partnership.

She founded the Sassy Jones Foundation to help women battling cancer. The foundation uses profits from every purchase with Sassy Jones to help with a cancer diagnosis, turbans, scarves, blankets, confidence affirmation cards, and headwraps.
