= Touchfire =

IPad Keyboard

- Inventor: Steve Isaac, Brad Melmon
- Inception: 2011
- Available: Available
- Current supplier: Touchfire, Inc.
- Last production year: 2013

TouchFire is a physical iPad keyboard designed by two Seattle-based inventors, Steve Isaac and Brad Melmon. The company was financed via the crowd-funding website, Kickstarter, and raised $201,400 in two months. The keyboard gained notoriety because of its construction from transparent silicone with magnets that sticks onto an iPad's on-screen keyboard. In 2013, TouchFire was listed as one of the “100 Brilliant Companies” by the Entrepreneur magazine.

== See also ==
- iPad
- Kickstarter
