= Rana el Kaliouby =

Egyptian-American computer scientist and entrepreneur

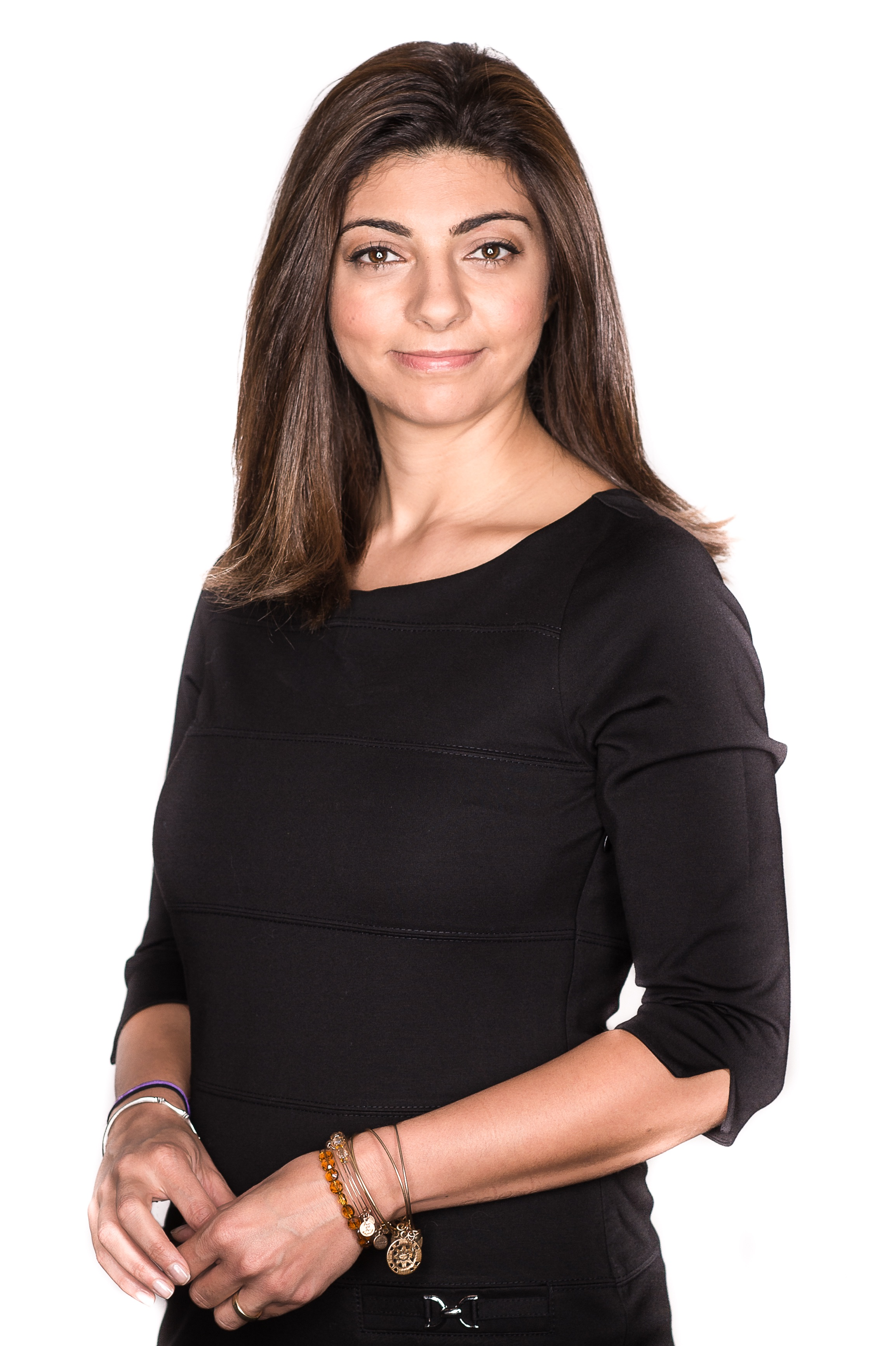
- Born: 1978 (age 47–48)
- Education: American University in Cairo (BS, MS); Newnham College, Cambridge (PhD)
- Title: CEO at Affectiva
- Children: 2
- Website: affectiva.com/rana-el-kaliouby

Rana el Kaliouby (Arabic: رنا القليوبي; born 1978) is an Egyptian-American computer scientist who co-founded Affectiva with Rosalind Picard; she currently runs a venture capital firm and the Pioneers of AI podcast.

== Education ==
El Kaliouby earned a bachelor's degree and Master of Science degree from the American University in Cairo, then a Ph.D. at Newnham College, Cambridge.

== Career ==
El Kaliouby worked as a research scientist at Massachusetts Institute of Technology, helping to found their Autism & Communication Technology Initiative. At the Affective Computing group of MIT Media Lab, she was part of a team that pioneered development of the "emotional hearing aid", which are emotion-reading wearable glasses.

She cofounded Affectiva with Rosalind Picard, leading its emotion science team. In 2016, she became the CEO of Affectiva. In May 2021, Affectiva agreed to be acquired by the Swedish company Smart Eye for US$73.5 million. The acquisition was completed in June and el Kaliouby became deputy CEO of Smart Eye.

She later stepped down from that role and co-founded Blue Tulip Ventures, an early-stage venture capital firm investing in "human-centric AI", with Gabi Zijderveld, a former Affectiva and Smart Eye chief marketing officer. In September 2024 she launched the podcast Pioneers of AI in association with Masters of Scale.

== Books ==
El Kaliouby's memoir Girl Decoded was published in April 2020.

El Kaliouby also contributed one chapter to the 2018 book Architects of Intelligence: The Truth About AI from the People Building it by the American futurist Martin Ford.

== See also ==
- List of Egyptian scientists
