= Pure Scum =

Australian film

- Directed by: Gideon Aroni
- Written by: Gideon Aroni
- Produced by: Leigh Schilling; Gideon Aroni; Amelia Nemet
- Starring: Will Hutchins; Nikita Chronis
- Cinematography: Jackson Hayat
- Edited by: Howard Aitken
- Music by: Dylan Reid
- Production companies: Off Kilter; Midnight Toast
- Release date: 2025
- Running time: 93 minutes
- Country: Australia

Pure Scum is a 2025 Australian thriller film written and directed by Gideon Aroni in his feature debut. The film follows two recently graduated private schoolboys in the aftermath of a drug-fueled car crash in the inner suburbs of Melbourne, Australia.

== Synopsis ==
Best mates and recently graduated high school students Ayden and Jesse flee into the Melbourne CBD after causing a fatal car crash on the outskirts of the city. As the police slowly close in, the pair attempt to bury their troubles in the hedonistic embrace of alcohol and drugs. After a series of increasingly dangerous decisions, however, the night quickly spirals into violence.

== Release ==
The film premiered at Fantastic Film Festival Australia in May 2025, winning the Audience Award, and went on to play at SXSW Sydney in October 2025.

In 2026 the film was acquired by US distributor Chroma and opened in Alamo Drafthouse cinemas on the 19th of August.

== Cast ==
- Will Hutchins as Ayden
- Nikita Chronis as Jesse
- Gideon Aroni as Chance
- Jess Zuker as the Interviewer
- Rebecca Howell as Linda
- Joe Petruzzi as Joe
- Lachlan Sproul as Squid
- Morgan Godfrey as Jazz
- Linden Compassi as Officer Hall
- Paul Moder as Dan
