= Stacy Brown-Philpot =

American businesswoman

- Education: University of Pennsylvania (BS); Stanford University (MBA)
- Board member of: HP Inc.; Nordstrom
- Spouse: Verdere Philpot

Stacy Brown-Philpot is the former CEO of TaskRabbit and a member of the Board of Directors of Noom, HP Inc and Nordstrom.

== Education ==
Brown-Philpot is from Detroit, Michigan. She received a B.S. from the Wharton School of Business and an M.B.A. from Stanford University. In 2025 she became a trustee for Stanford University.

== Career ==
Brown-Philpot began working at Google in 2003. Prior to joining TaskRabbit, she was at Google for almost 10 years. Brown-Philpot had moved from San Francisco Bay Area to Hyderabad, India to head Google's online sales and operations. In 2015, Brown-Philpot was selected for Fortune's 40 Under 40 ranking of the most significant young people in business.

Brown-Philpot was the CEO of TaskRabbit, and a member of the Board of Directors of Noom and HP Inc. The Financial Times has noted she is a "rare example of a black, female chief executive in the tech industry." In August 2020, Brown-Philpot resigned as CEO.
