= Daniella Ballou-Aares =

Founder and CEO of the Leadership Now Project

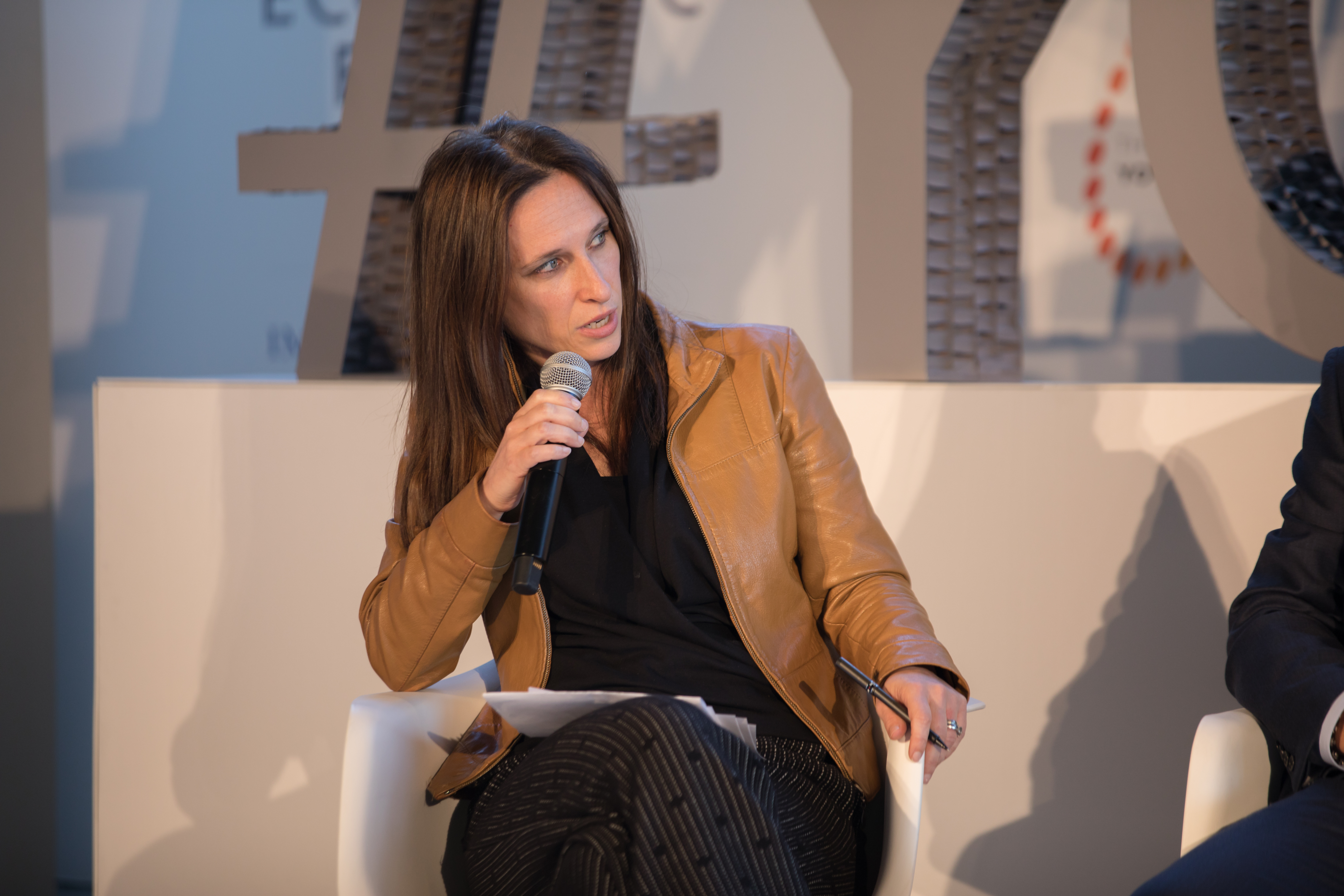
- Ballou-Aares at the Young Global Leaders Summit in 2018
- Born: 1974 (age 51–52)
- Education: Cornell University (BSc); Harvard University (MBA); Harvard University (MPA)
- Occupations: management consultant; advisor; founder; activist
- Title: Founder & CEO
- Spouse: Martin Aares
- Children: 2

Daniella Ballou-Aares (born 1974) is the founder and CEO of the Leadership Now Project and a former Senior Advisor for Development in the Obama Administration. She was a World Economic Forum Young Global Leader and was on the group's Advisory Council. She is a co-founder of the global consulting firm Dalberg.

== Early life and education ==
Ballou-Aares was born to Pamela Ballou, a receptionist in Brooklyn, and George Ballou, a longshoreman in Manhattan.

She has a Bachelor of Science degree in Operations Research and Industrial Engineering from Cornell University. Ballou-Aares has an MBA from the Harvard Business School and an MPA from the Harvard Kennedy School of Government.

== Career ==
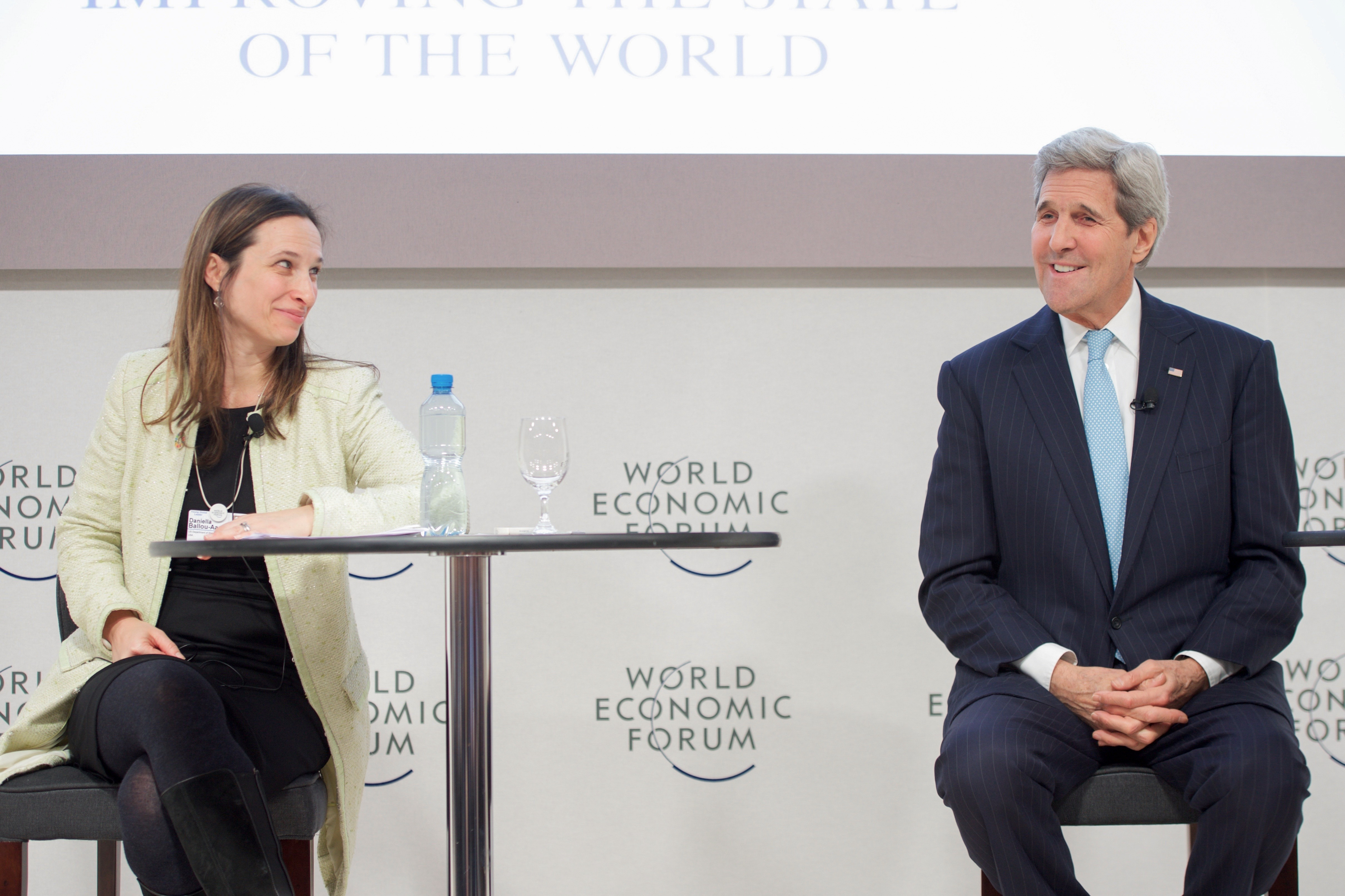
Secretary Kerry and Senior Advisor Ballou-Aares at the World Economic Forum in Davos in 2016

Ballou-Aares was a management consultant for Bain & Company in the U.S., U.K., and South Africa. She was one of the co-founders of Dalberg in 2004 and helped it grow into a global consulting business with offices in more than two dozen countries across several continents. Ballou-Aares was the first Regional Director for Americas at Dalberg. She also set up the firm's global health practice.

Early in her career, Ballou-Aares wrote case studies for Harvard Business School.

Ballou-Aares worked as a senior advisor for Development to then Secretaries of State, Hillary Clinton and John Kerry in the Obama Administration. She returned to Dalberg as a Partner after serving in the Obama Administration.

Ballou-Aares is an advisor to Apolitical Foundation, a Berlin, Germany-based nonprofit organization.

Ballou-Aares is currently the CEO of the Leadership Now Project which she founded in 2017.

== Leadership Now Project ==
The Leadership Now Project is a membership-based nonprofit 501(c)(4) issue advocacy organization. The New York Times described it as a "coalition of 400 politically active current and retired executives ... " The Associated Press described the Leadership Now Project as a "group of business executives, academics and thought leaders." Bloomberg noted the Leadership Now Project as a "group of business leaders who had organized to counter what they saw as threats to democracy during the last Trump administration."

Eddie Fishman, the managing director of the investment management firm D.E. Shaw & Company, John Pepper, a former CEO of Procter & Gamble, Paul Tagliabue, a former commissioner of the National Football League (NFL), Jeni Britton, the founder of Jeni's Splendid Ice Creams, and Thomas W. Florsheim Jr., CEO of the Weyco Group, are among the members of the Leadership Now Project.

The Financial Times sourced The Leadership Now Project while explaining what will happen now to the campaign funds President Biden has so far raised after Biden's announcement that he is withdrawing from the 2024 Presidential race.

Among other things, the Leadership Now Project supports efforts to ensure voting access, election integrity, and efforts that address issues like gerrymandering. Ballou-Aares wrote about how her State Department work experience and the 2016 U.S. elections were among the factors that led to the creation of the Leadership Now Project.

In 2024, Melinda Gates participated in the Annual Meeting of the Leadership Now Project in New York to discuss women's leadership in democracy.

In September 2024, Leadership Now Project endorsed Harris-Walz.

== Writing ==
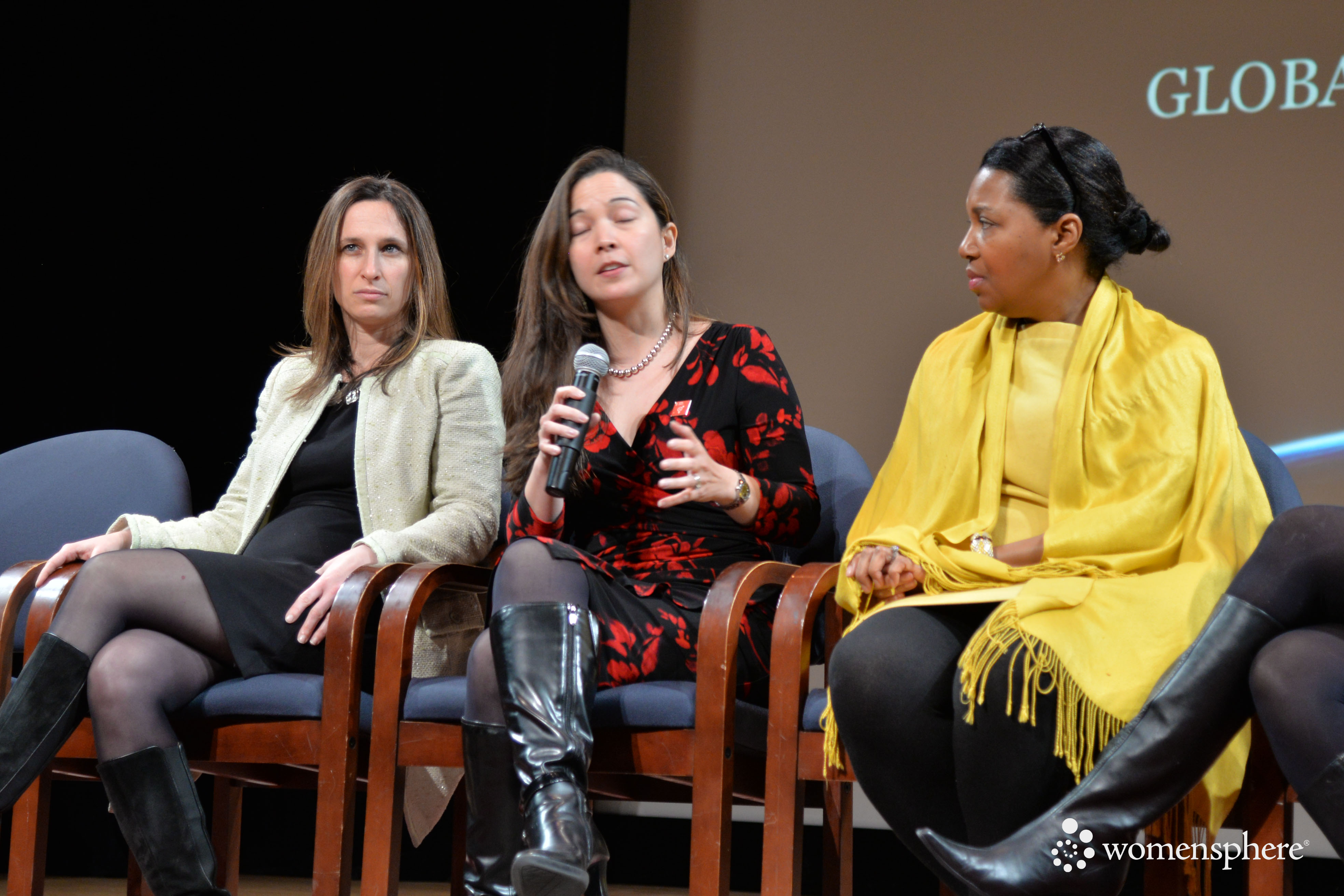
Ballou-Aares with others at the Womensphere Summit in New York (March 2016)

In 2024, Ballou-Aares wrote in Fast Company about the rise of authoritarianism and what Gen X leaders must do to stop this.

In 2021, Ballou-Aares and Michael Porter of the Harvard Business School wrote about the need for business leaders to take action on climate issues and voting rights.

In 2020, Ballou-Aares and Vineeta Vijayaraghavan wrote in the Harvard Business Review about How Business Leaders Can Champion Democracy.

== Views ==
In the run-up to the 2024 U.S. presidential elections and after the first Presidential debate organized by CNN in Atlanta, Ballou-Aares explained on CNN's Quest Means Business about why Leadership Now Project believes Joe Biden should withdraw from the race. She was interviewed by Michelle Fleury of the BBC on the same topic and Ballou-Aares described how more than 80% of the membership of Leadership Now Project believed going public about asking President Joe Biden to pass the torch was the right thing to do.

After Biden announced his withdrawal from the 2024 Presidential race, Ballou-Aares described the decision as “a historic precedent for selfless leadership” and “a sign of the strength of American democracy.”

In 2019, Ballou-Aares participated in a panel discussion on the Future of Democracy at the World Economic Forum in Davos moderated by Martin Wolf where the other panel members were Ivan Duque, the then President of Colombia, Nikol Pashinyan, the Prime Minister of Armenia, K P Sharma Oli, the Prime Minister of Nepal, and Arthur Gregg Sulzberger, the Publisher of The New York Times.

In 2022, Ballou-Aares noted that the Disney-DeSantis dispute in Florida had made the U.S. "a higher political risk environment."

In her TED talk in 2023, Ballou-Aares talked about why business leaders need to play a role in protecting democracy and how business leaders can play a role in renewing democracy.

On Molly Jong-Fast's podcast Fast Politics, Ballou-Aares joined Rick Wilson of The Lincoln Project and Arelis Hernandez of The Washington Post to discuss Leadership Now Project's endeavors to " mobilize business leaders to protect democracy."

In a Masters of Scale podcast with Bob Safian, former editor of Fast Company, Ballous-Aares discussed the role of businesses, business executives, and business leaders including CEOs in the democratic process and she also noted

So I think the transactional nature that many companies have taken to politics can be really detrimental. And actually, I think a lot of Americans have taken a transactional nature to politics. They’ve just said, “Hey, I care about one issue. And I’m just going to vote based on that issue. I care about one policy.” If you just do that, and you’re not worrying about: Are these political leaders governing well for the totality of the citizens and the issues? You end up where we are today.

In May 2024, Ballou-Aares was part of a panel discussion at the 2024 Global Conference organized by the Milken Institute on the topic Can Capitalism Safeguard Democracy?

In July 2024, Ballou-Aares was a keynote speaker and participated in a discussion on Mitigating Risk and Managing Relationships at the Aspen ESG Summit of the Aspen Institute.

In August 2024, Ballou-Aares was quoted by the Financial Times in their article about how American corporate CEOs are approaching the upcoming Harris-Trump presidential contest. She noted that "existing Democratic supporters who had pulled back or weren’t supporting at the presidential level . . . are back and re-engaged."

In 2025, Ballou-Aares was on the Jessica Yellin Show where Ballou-Aares discussed LNP's poll conducted with Harris in April 2025 among business leaders. Ballou-Aares discussed the impact of the tariffs on the businesses in the U.S., especially small businesses Ballou-Aares discussed how businesses and American competitiveness will be impacted by the Trump administration's education policy in particular, and the Trump administration policies and executive actions in general.

Also in May 2025, Ballou-Aares talked with Mary Mazzoni, the executive editor of TriplePundit, on 3BL’s video series, “What the…?” and discussed the business impacts of the various executive actions of the current Trump administration, including targeted tariffs, and political attacks on DEI initiatives. Ballou-Aares also discussed how companies with deep commitments to their proclaimed core values — rather than just superficial commitments — tend to be more resilient to political attacks.

In November 2025, NPR quoted Ballou-Aares regarding the Trump administration's business and economic policies. The article also referred to the poll conducted by the Leadership Now Project in association with Harris.

== Personal life ==
Ballou-Aares is married to Martin Aares whom she met while both were at Harvard. They have two children.
