= Saeju Jeong =

South Korean entrepreneur (born 1981)

- 정세주
- Born: 1981 (age 43–44); South Korea
- Education: Hongik University (BEng)
- Occupation: Business executive
- Years active: 2001–present
- Title: Executive Chairman of Noom (2023–present)

Jeong Saeju (Korean: 정세주; born 1981) is an American entrepreneur and a co-founder, chairman, and the former CEO of Noom, a weight loss company.

== Early life and education ==
Jeong was born in 1981, in South Korea, to a family of doctors. In 2001, he founded BuyHard Productions, an independent music label with a focus on heavy metal. In 2002, he joined the Republic of Korea Army as an IT specialist. He pursued a Bachelor of Engineering degree from Hongik University, but in 2005, he dropped out to move to Manhattan, New York.

== Career ==
In Harlem, Jeong met Noom co-founder Artem Petakov. In 2007, the two established WorkSmart Labs and itsfirst prototype, a stationary-bike accessory. Jeong worked various sales jobs and as a food delivery driver.

In 2011, WorkSmart rebranded to Noom and raised a US$2.6 million seed round led by Kleiner Perkins.

Noom relaunched in 2017 with a subscription-based weight-management app.

In 2020, Jeong was awarded the Ernst & Young Entrepreneur of the Year Award.

In 2021, Noom raised $540 million in funding, valuing the company at $3.7 billion.

In 2023, Jeong stepped down as Noom CEO and was replaced by Geoff Cook, a founder of The Meet Group.
