= Shellye Archambeau =

American businesswoman and CEO

Shellye L Archambeau
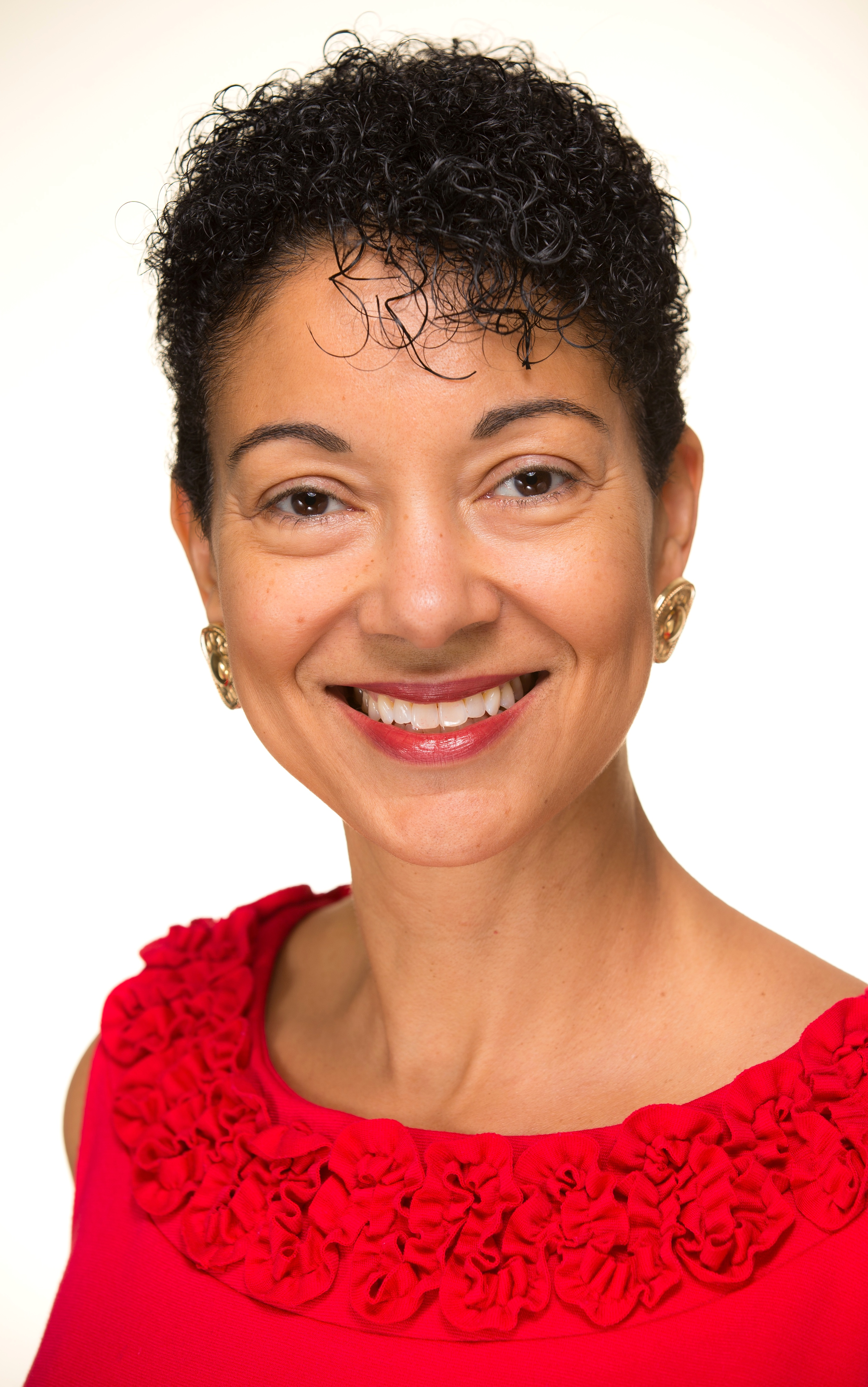
- Education: Wharton School of Business
- Occupation: Business executive
- Employer: MetricStream
- Board member of: Verizon Communications; Arbitron Watermark

Shellye Archambeau is an American businesswoman and former CEO of MetricStream, a GRC company based in Palo Alto, California. She has held executive positions for numerous companies, including a 15-year career at IBM where she became the first African American woman at the company to be sent on assignment internationally. Archambeau is a guest lecturer at her alma mater, the Wharton School of the University of Pennsylvania. She is also a writer. She wrote Unapologetically Ambitious and co-authored Marketing That Works. Archambeau is a regular contributor for Xconomy.

== Early life and education ==
Archambeau grew up as the oldest of four children. Her parents had four kids in five years, attributing her competitive nature to growing up with siblings so close in age. In grade school, Archambeau was heavily involved in sports, but her growth spurt (being 5'10" by ninth grade) kept her from high school sports, causing her to focus on clubs and organizations. Archambeau attended the Wharton School of Business in Pennsylvania. She worked as a sales assistant for IBM when she was in college, later taking a full-time job in sales after learning that many CEOs had also previously worked in sales.

== Career ==
After graduation, Archambeau took a full-time job with IBM where she would eventually have a 15-year career, working her way up the corporate ladder. She stated that one of her goals was to run a company and that she had aspirations of becoming the CEO of IBM, working her way through various positions and later running IBM's Asia Pacific business for the public sector. That assignment made her the first African American woman to be sent on assignment internationally by the company. While at IBM, Archambeau was recruited by Blockbuster where she served as president of the company's e-commerce division. As the leader of a new division, she was responsible for creating Blockbuster's online presence. While she was with Blockbuster, she was recognized as one of the Top 25 Click and Mortar Executives by Internet World.

Archambeau joined NorthPoint Communications as part of its executive team during the company's merger with Verizon. Five months into her new career, Verizon pulled out of the merger, causing challenges for the company. Archambeau and the rest of the executive team stayed together until NorthPoint ended up selling its assets to AT&T. During her time there, she was recruited by Andy Rachleff of Benchmark Capital who at the time served on the board of NorthPoint and Loudcloud, Inc. She moved on to become the chief marketing officer at Loudcloud. She left the company in 2002 to take her first CEO job.

In 2002, Archambeau joined Zaplet, Inc. as the company's CEO and oversaw it through the merger with MetricStream in 2004. When the two companies merged, she became the CEO of the newly formed company. While CEO of MetricStream, Archambeau was elected to the Board of Arbitron, a position she has held from 2005 through 2013. She also serves on the board of directors for Verizon Communications and Nordstrom Inc.

== Awards and recognition ==
In addition to being recognized as one of the Top 25 Click and Mortar Executives by Internet World, Archambeau has received numerous other awards and recognition throughout her career. In 2014 she was named one of the 46 Most Important African-Americans in Technology by the Business Insider, ranking at No. 11. The year prior she was No. 2 on the list of the 25 Most Influential African-Americans in Technology. She was also recognized as one of the 50 Most Important African Americans in Technology.

== See also ==
- List of female top executives
