= Evite =

Social-planning website for creating, sending, and managing online invitations

Evite is a social-planning website for creating, sending, and managing online invitations. The website offers digital invitations with RSVP tracking. It also offers greeting cards, announcements, E-Gift cards, and party planning ideas.

Evite was launched in 1998 by co-founders Al Lieb and Selina Tobaccowala. Since 2020, private investors have owned Evite after two decades of ownership under media conglomerates.

== Legal controversy ==
In 2007, Evite threatened to sue San Francisco-based startup and competitor Socializr (later acquired by Punchbowl.com) due to alleged copyright infringement.

== Data breach ==
In July 2019, Evite data was found for sale online. Evite admitted that their systems were compromised and data of over 100 million accounts were stolen. According to Evite, the breach did not contain "user information more recent than 2013". The stolen data included users' real names, usernames, email addresses, passwords, dates of birth, phone numbers, and mailing addresses. Evite recommended users to change their passwords, but it was not required. Also, since Evite stored plaintext passwords, if passwords were reused elsewhere, those accounts could be vulnerable to credential stuffing attacks.
