= Selina Tobaccowala =

American entrepreneur and software product executive

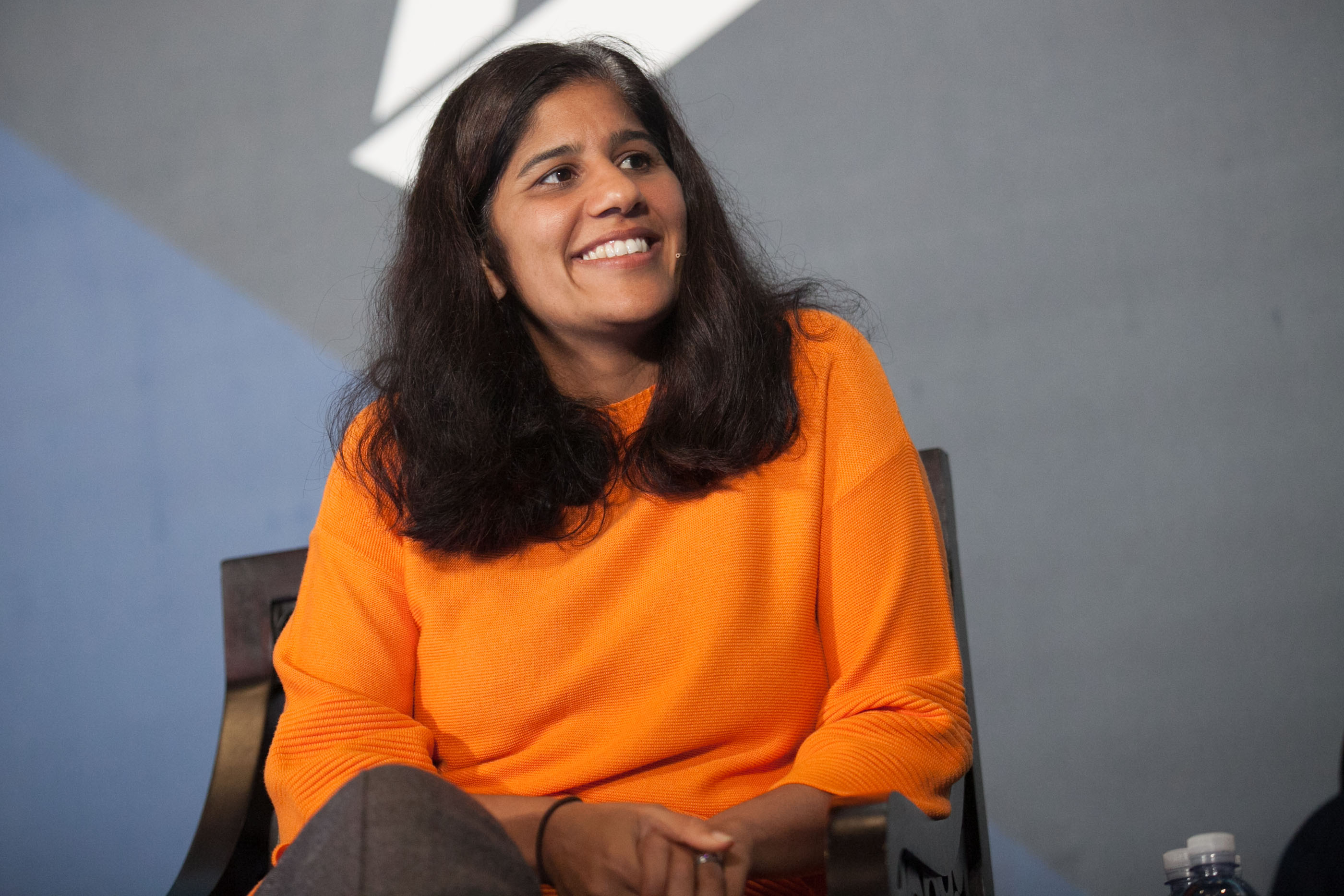
- Born: 1977 (age 48–49); Saddle River, New Jersey, U.S.
- Education: Stanford University
- Occupations: entrepreneur, software product executive
- Years active: 1997 - present
- Known for: Co-founding Evite

Selina Tobaccowala is an American entrepreneur and software product executive. She is known for co-founding the company Evite.

== Early life and education ==
Selina Tobaccowala attended Ramsey High School in New Jersey. When she was 14 years old, Tobaccowala spent 6 days volunteering at the Mother Teresa Asha daan, a shelter for the mentally and physically disabled that is affiliated with the Missionaries of Charity in India. Tobaccowala later attended Stanford University, graduating with a bachelor's degree in computer science.

== Career ==
While in college, Tobaccowala and fellow Stanford student Al Leib founded Evite in 1997. She served as vice president of engineering at Evite until 2001, when Evite was acquired by Ticketmaster. After managing the transition, she became senior vice president of product at Ticketmaster's Europe division.

Tobaccowala joined SurveyMonkey in 2009 as vice president of product and engineering, before becoming president and chief technology officer.

In 2016, Tobaccowala joined with Evite co-founder, Al Lieb, to start Gixo, a fitness app that streams live exercise classes to mobile devices. Gixo was acquired in 2019 by Openfit, a subsidiary of the Beachbody Company. Tobaccowala has served as Openfit's chief digital officer.

Tobaccowala serves on the board of Redfin and Vital Voices. She previously served on the board of Tugboat Yards and the advisory board of HubSpot.
