= Entrepreneur (magazine) =

American magazine and website

- Dino Morea, cover dated 21 November 2023
- Editor-in-Chief: Jason Feifer
- Frequency: Monthly
- Total circulation: 510,483 (July 2020)
- Founded: 1977; 49 years ago
- Company: Entrepreneur Media, Inc.
- Country: United States
- Based in: Irvine, California, U.S.
- Language: English
- Website: entrepreneur.com
- ISSN: 0163-3341
- OCLC: 759097756

Entrepreneur is an American magazine and website that carries news stories about entrepreneurship, small business management, and business. First published in 1977, it is published by Entrepreneur Media Inc., headquartered in Irvine, California. The magazine publishes 10 issues annually, available through subscription and on newsstands. It has been published under license internationally in Mexico, Russia, India, Hungary, the Philippines, South Africa, and others. Its editor-in-chief is Jason Feifer and its owner is Peter Shea.

== History ==
Since 1979, Entrepreneur has annually published a list of its top 500 franchise companies. The magazine also published many other lists and awards, one of the most prominent being the Entrepreneur 360 formed to identify businesses mastering the art and science of growing a business. Companies are evaluated based on the analysis of 50-plus data points organized into five pillars; Revenue and Customers, Management Efficiency, Innovation, Financial Evaluation, and Business Valuation.

In 1996, the magazine launched its website, Entrepreneur.com, which expanded to include features, contests, and other publications and spin-offs.

== Franchise 500 ==
The Franchise 500 is an annual list compiled and published by Entrepreneur that ranks 500 of the most prominent American franchising companies through a submission and review process. The Franchise 500 first began in 1979 and has been published every year since.

== Spin-offs ==
Entrepreneur publishes the Entrepreneur StartUps magazine, available through subscription and on newsstands. The magazine publishes a blog managed by a dedicated online staff. It is also published in digital editions through its mobile apps.

In 1999, the website YoungEntrepreneur.com was created as a spin-off of Entrepreneur.com. It is an online forum for young entrepreneurs. In 2010, Entrepreneur launched the website SecondAct.com, which is targeted at an older audience. When launched, the site used advertising as its sole source of revenue. Entrepreneur also publishes books through its Entrepreneur Press division. The company has a backlist of over 200 titles on business and entrepreneurship.

== Masters of Scale ==
In April 2017, Reid Hoffman announced the launch of a new podcast called "Masters of Scale", with Entrepreneur magazine as its media partner. In each episode, Reid acts as the host, introducing a counterintuitive business theory and proving it out through the episode through a series of conversations with successful entrepreneurs. Masters of Scale is committed to a 50-50 gender balance.

The official podcast launched on 5 May 2017, and was featured on the Entrepreneur website, but it is now exclusively hosted at mastersofscale.com. Episodes so far feature guests such as Mark Zuckerberg, Brian Chesky, Sheryl Sandberg, Stewart Butterfield, Diane Greene, John Elkann, and Nancy Lublin.

== Controversies ==
In 2006, unusual web traffic measurements led to allegations that Entrepreneur.com used pop-ups to artificially boost its number of readers.

The company has been involved in many lawsuits regarding its trademark on the word entrepreneur, suing a wide variety of entities for using the word. The trademark has generally attracted criticism for being on a commonly used word for which there is no substitute, and the aggressiveness with which it is applied has been noted as somewhat ironic; Business Week asked, "Why would the publisher of Entrepreneur magazine be bullying entrepreneurs?"
