= Cindy Mi =

Chinese educator

- Born: Hebei, China
- Education: Cheung Kong Graduate School of Business (CKGSB)
- Occupations: Educator; Entrepreneur

Cindy Mi is a Chinese entrepreneur. She is the co-founder of ABC English and founder of VIPKid.

== Biography ==
Mi was born in the province of ratio Hebei, China. At age 14 Mi moved to Harbin in north-eastern China. She continued to teach herself English, and by age 15 she began to tutor other students in English at an extracurricular school organized by her uncle in Heilongjiang Province in northeastern China.

By age 17, she dropped out of high school to co-found tutoring company ABC English with her uncle. During that time she continued to work on her own studies and eventually earned a bachelor's degree in English literature from Beijing Foreign Language University. She later received an MBA from the Cheung Kong Graduate School of Business and attended Cornell Johnson Graduate School of Management in the US as an exchange student.

Mi founded VIPKid in 2013 while working as an English-language teacher in Beijing. In 2017, Cindy Mi launched a subsidiary of the wider VIPKid brand called LingoBus that allows tutors to teach Mandarin.
