= Smart Eye =

Swedish artificial intelligence company

Smart Eye AB
- Type: Public Company
- Industry: Hardware and Software Development
- Founded: 1999
- Founder: Martin Krantz, Founder &CEO Rana el Kaliouby, PhD, Deputy CEO; Co-Founder & CEO Affectiva Peter Hartzbech, Founder & CEO iMotions
- Headquarters: Gothenburg, Sweden
- Products: Driver Monitoring System, Interior Sensing AI, AIS, Smart Eye Pro, Affectiva Media Analytics, and iMotions biometrics platform.
- Number of employees: 250-300
- Website: www.smarteye.ai

Smart Eye AB is a Swedish artificial intelligence (AI) company founded in 1999 and headquartered in Gothenburg, Sweden. Smart Eye develops Human Insight AI, technology that understands, supports and predicts human behavior in complex environments. Smart Eye develops and deploys several core technologies that help gain insights from subtle and nuanced changes in human behavior, reactions and expressions. These technologies include head tracking, eye tracking, facial expression analysis and Emotion AI, activity and object detection, and multimodal sensor data analysis.

In 2021, Smart Eye acquired Affectiva and iMotions.

The company sells into two main business areas: Automotive and Behavioral Research. Smart Eye's solutions are sold directly and through resellers and partners worldwide.

== Automotive ==
Smart Eye sells its technology to the automotive industry, where its driver monitoring systems and interior sensing software is integrated into new vehicles or in fleets for aftermarket installation.

=== Driver Monitoring System (DMS) ===
Smart Eye provides automotive OEMs and Tier 1 suppliers with road-ready driver monitoring software that can be embedded in new vehicles that are produced.

The company's AI-based software uses in-car cameras to analyze eye gaze, head movement, body posture, activities and objects to determine dangerous driving behavior such as distraction and drowsiness.

Smart Eye's algorithms are developed using computer vision, deep learning and large amounts of data that Smart Eye collects and annotates. The company augments these data sets with synthetic data. Smart Eye's algorithms are hardware agnostic and support a wide range of cameras and Systems on Chip (SoC), from the low to the very high-end. Smart Eye's DMS does not store video of the driver.

In Europe, Driver Monitoring Systems are becoming mandatory automotive safety technology, due to legislation, regulation and ratings agencies. The EU General Safety Regulation (GSR) has adopted ADDW (Advanced Driver Distraction Warning) which will require direct monitoring of the driver. This legislation will apply to all new type registrations from July 2024 and all new vehicle registrations from July 2026^{1}. And the European New Car Assessment Programme (Euro NCAP) is now requiring driver monitoring systems for 5-star ratings.

- In September 2022 Smart Eye announced that its DMS is already deployed in more than 1 million cars on the road.
- At CES in January 2023, Smart Eye exhibited a Polestar 3 with Smart Eye DMS in its booth.
- As of April 2023, the company has also secured 217 design wins from more than 19 global car manufacturers (OEMs), including BMW, Polestar and Geely.
- On June 20, 2023, Smart Eye revealed new metrics that remotely monitor heart and respiration rates as indicators of physical well-being.

=== Interior Sensing ===
Smart Eye also sells Interior Sensing software to the automotive industry. Interior Sensing combines driver monitoring with cabin and occupant monitoring, to understand what is happening in a vehicle. This insight helps car makers build in cabin experiences that provide better safety, comfort, wellness and entertainment.

Interior Sensing software detects the presence of occupants and provides information to the vehicle's safety systems to determine proper seating position or use of seatbelt. It can also detect a child seat and if it is occupied, to ensure no child is left behind unattended. Sensors can detect a registered individual and adjust settings for seats, mirrors, and music, lighting, and temperature preferences. And, by monitoring vital signs such as heart rate, respiration rate, and body temperature the vehicle can detect sudden illness.

With Affectiva Emotion AI, Interior Sensing can detect occupant mood, emotions, and reactions, to determine complex human states such as road rage and fear. It also enables automakers to understand, with proper safeguards for privacy, how people react to over-the-air software updates that are pushed to their vehicle, as well as their level of enjoyment with the in-vehicle environment and the content they are consuming.

In January 2023, Smart Eye Automotive Interior Sensing was named CES 2022 Innovation Awards Honoree.

=== DMS for Aftermarket Fleet Installation and Small-Volume OEMs ===
Smart Eye also provides AIS (Advanced AI System), a complete hardware and software Driver Monitoring System (DMS) for small-volume vehicle manufacturers and aftermarket installation for vehicle fleets, such as buses and trucks.

AIS uses Smart Eye's automotive grade DMS software that analyzes subtle changes in a driver's head movements, eye gaze, and facial expressions to detect early signs of drowsiness and distraction in real time. AIS promptly alerts drivers at the earliest possible point, to prevent road accidents and promote safe driving behavior.

AIS consists of a standalone camera unit and an Electronic Control Unit (ECU) with wireless connectivity. AIS is designed with data privacy in mind, it runs in real time and does not store any video or data. It is a flexible and easy to use cabin safety system that can be installed in under five minutes.

AIS seamlessly integrates with fleet management systems, such as Geotab and is available on Geotab Marketplace.

In June 2023, Smart Eye announced that it signed a deal for AIS Driver Monitoring System for fleets with Linde, the world's largest industrial gas company and the leading industrial gas company in the Nordics.

== Behavioral Research ==
In behavioral research, Smart Eye products enable its clients to gain deeper insights into human behavior and human-machine interaction in academic and commercial sectors, including automotive, aviation, assistive technology, behavioral science and many more fields. Smart Eye's behavioral research business consists of Research Instruments, Affectiva Media Analytics and the iMotions biosensor software platform.

=== Research Instruments ===
Smart Eye's Research Instruments business unit develops eye tracking systems for research organizations that analyze human behavior and the impact of human factors in industry and academia. These eye tracking systems are used in complex research environments, including car and flight simulators, vehicle studies, multi-screen or control room environments, and long-range tracking.

Research instrument's systems combine cameras, illumination modules, and AI-based algorithms and enable research organizations to collect data in any environment.

Research Instruments also offers product integration. By integrating its head, face and eye-tracking technology into other products and devices, Smart Eye enables a better understanding of human-to-human and human-to-machine interactions. An example is in assistive technology, where partner Smartbox has launched Lumin-i, an eye tracking based communication aid that gives a voice to AAC (Augmentative and Alternative Communication) users with complex and limited mobility. Another example is in aviation where Smart Eye eye trackers are used in flight simulators for pilot training and for UX design of the cockpit instrument cluster.

Customers and partners are found in different industries and include names such as NASA, BMW, Audi, Boeing, Airbus, Volvo Cars, GM, Toyo, Universal Studio Media Labs, Johns Hopkins University, and Harvard University.

=== Affectiva Media Analytics ===
In June 2019 Smart Eye acquired Affectiva, the startup that spun out of MIT Media Lab and that created a new technology category of Artificial Emotional Intelligence, namely, Emotion AI. Emotion AI analyzes non-verbal cues, such as facial expressions, body posture and gestures, and human activities and the objects people use, to gain understanding of human reactions, emotions, and cognitive states in context.

Upon acquisition, Affectiva became a wholly owned subsidiary of the Smart Eye Group and effectively merged with Smart Eye. Affectiva Media Analytics is run as a business unit in the company’s Behavioral Research business area.

Affectiva Media Analytics uses Emotion AI and facial coding techniques to help large brands, media, entertainment, and market research companies gain a deeper understanding of how consumers and audiences engage with their content, products, and services such as advertising, television, and movies. The solution enhances traditional research methods such as surveys or focus groups and is used by 26 percent of the Fortune Global 500 companies and 90 of the world’s 100 largest advertisers. During 2022, 1.6 million audience videos were processed by Affectiva Media Analytics.

=== iMotions Biosensor Platform ===
In October 2019 Smart Eye acquired iMotions, a software company headquartered in Copenhagen, Denmark. As a wholly owned subsidiary of the Smart Eye Group, iMotions continues to operate independently.

iMotions develops a software platform that enables users to collect, fuse, and analyze data from sensors measuring a wide range of biometric responses, such as attention (eye-tracking including Research Instrument’s eye trackers), emotions (facial expression analysis including Affectiva Emotion AI), galvanic skin response, brain activity, muscle response, and heart rate. Measuring responses through biosensors enables research into human behavior with much higher validity than survey-based methods.

The iMotions platform currently integrates and synchronizes data from more than 50 biosensors from 21 different partners, and it enables their clients to conduct their research much faster and more cost-effectively. In 2022, 36,492 human behavior studies were run on the iMotions platform. Its 1,300 customers include 850 universities worldwide and 68 of the world’s top 100 research universities.

=== History ===
Smart Eye AB was founded in 1999 with the vision of bridging the gap between humans and machines. Its first product was real-time and completely non-invasive eye tracking.

- 2001 – Release of Smart Eye Pro, a system with flexible camera configuration
- 2005 – Release of AntiSleep, a mono camera system built on cost efficient hardware for automotive use
- 2009 – Embedded AntiSleep, complete integrated mono camera automotive grade system running on BlackFin DSP
- 2012 – DR 120, dual camera eye tracker integrated in a computer monitor
- 2013 – Fully automatic initialization for Smart Eye Pro
- 2014 – Release of Blackbird, a reference system for the automotive industry
- 2015 – Release of Aurora, a removable, high-precision screen metering system
- 2016 – IPO at First North Nasdaq OMX Stockholm
- 2017 – Release of Smart AI, a platform for multimodal In-Car Artificial Intelligence
- 2018 - Smart Eye and Omnivision in cooperation for next generation image sensors for in-car AI
- 2019 - Smart Eye announces BMW as one of its automotive OEM customers
- 2020 - OmniVision, Ambarella and Smart Eye Partner on Automotive Industry’s First Combined Driver Monitoring and Videoconferencing Camera Solution
- 2021 - Smart Eye launches AIS – a complete driver monitoring system for the automotive aftermarket
- 2021 – Smart Eye Acquires Affectiva
- 2021 – Smart Eye partners with Smartbox to develop and launch Lumin-i, an eye tracking product that enables Augmentative and Alternative Communication (AAC) users with complex and limited mobility to have a voice.
- 2021 – Smart Eye Acquired iMotions
- 2022 – Smart Eye Announces its Automotive Driver Monitoring Technology Has Been Installed in more than 1,000,000 Cars on Roads Globally
- 2022 - Smart Eye Automotive Interior Sensing Named CES 2022 Innovation Awards Honoree
- 2022- Polestar 3 with Smart Eye’s Driver Monitoring System on Show at CES
- 2023 - Smart Eye Signs Breakthrough Deal for AIS Driver Monitoring System for Fleets with Linde
