= VIPKid =

Global EdTech company

- Type: Private
- Industry: Education, Educational Technology
- Founded: October 2013; 13 years ago
- Founders: Cindy Mi, Jessie Chen, and Victor Zhang
- Headquarters: Singapore, Singapore
- Website: https://vipkid.com

VIPKid, also known as VIPKID, is an online teaching and education company.

== History ==
Founded in 2013 and formally launched in 2014 by Cindy Mi, the VIPKid platform connects paying students with teachers in the United States and Canada. Its online-classroom portal enables students to receive 25-minute English language lessons from fluent English-speaking teachers. Students and teachers communicate via its global classroom platform.

In 2017, VIPKid launched a new service, Lingo Bus, to teach Mandarin to students of 5 to 12 years old.

In 2017, VIPKid reported that it had raised $200 million in initial series funding, and in April 2018 raised an additional $500 million in series D+ funding. Combined, this amount equated VIPKID's valuation to $3 billion. As of November 2018, the company reported having 60,000 contracted teachers to teach 500,000 students.

In May 2020, VIPKID announced that all current teachers would gradually transition to a new service fee structure and the base rate adjustment policy will be phased out. This will effectively result in a pay reduction for the vast majority of their teachers.

In 2021 the company stopped providing services in China involving teachers based abroad. China-based customers will use Chinese citizen teachers in China or teachers residing in China who have teaching licenses.

== COVID-19 pandemic ==
In February 2020, VIPKid donated 1.5 million English and math classes to affected students from the COVID-19 pandemic. Students in the city of Wuhan, Hubei Province, and children of medical workers were given priority for free classes.

== See also ==
- English education in China
- New Oriental Education & Technology Group
