= Leadership Now Project =

American business and political organization

- Leadership Now Project
- Formation: 2017; 9 years ago
- Founder: Daniella Ballou-Aares
- Type: Nonprofit group of executives and business leaders
- Legal status: 501(c)(4)
- Headquarters: Washington D.C.
- Region served: USA
- Chief Executive Officer: Daniella Ballou-Aares
- Website: www.leadershipnowproject.org

The Leadership Now Project (LNP) is a nonprofit membership group for business leaders who seek to "protect and renew American democracy." For 2023–2024, the group stated that its goals were to educate business professionals about democracy, reform elections, and, as a 501(c)(4) organization, support "moderate candidates" in U.S. elections.

The New York Times described LNP as a "coalition of 400 politically active current and retired executives". The Associated Press described LNP as a "group of business executives, academics and thought leaders." Bloomberg described LNP as a "group of business leaders who had organized to counter what they saw as threats to democracy during the last Trump administration."

== History ==
The Leadership Now Project was founded in 2017 by Daniella Ballou-Aares as President, Vicky Hausman (now with Forward Majority) as Treasurer, and Katherine Cousins as Secretary. Ballou-Aares is the CEO of LNP.

The New York Times described Ballou-Aares as a "business executive who was a senior State Department adviser during the Obama administration."

By 2024, the group was vocal in warning about the "threats posed by a second term of Donald Trump.”

On July 5, 2024, 168 LNP members signed a letter which urged Joe Biden to end his 2024 re-election bid.

== Affiliates & partners ==
Leadership Now Project's affiliates and partners include Leadership Now Arizona, Leadership Now Ohio, and the Wisconsin Business Leaders for Democracy (WBLD).

== Members ==
Members of LNP include

- Eddie Fishman, the managing director of the investment management firm D.E. Shaw & Company
- John Pepper, a former CEO of Procter & Gamble
- Paul Tagliabue, a former commissioner of the National Football League (NFL) (died 2025)
- Jeni Britton, the founder of Jeni's Splendid Ice Creams
- Thomas W. Florsheim Jr., CEO of the Weyco Group
- Sachin Shivram, CEO of Wisconsin Aluminum Foundry

== Activities ==
Prior to the 2020 election, the Project arranged for more than 50 business leaders to issue a statement about election integrity.

In 2024, LNP submitted an amicus brief to oppose immunity from prosecution for President Donald Trump. It also supported an anti-gerrymandering ballot initiative in Ohio.

In June 2024, LNP issued a pledge, signed by business leaders, that it asked to be signed by presidential candidates. The six commitments of the pledge include the "peaceful transition of power, in victory or defeat."

In 2024, Melinda Gates participated in LNP's Annual Meeting in New York.

The group has also attracted criticism, such as its lack of practical action for the leaders' companies to reduce "income and wealth inequality" and improve job security.

=== 2024 US Presidential election ===
In the run-up to the 2024 U.S. presidential elections and after the first Presidential debate organized by CNN in Atlanta, Ballou-Aares of LNP explained on CNN's Quest Means Business about why LNP believes Joe Biden should withdraw from the race. Ballou-Aares told Michelle Fleury of the BBC how more than 80% of the membership of LNP believed going public about asking President Joe Biden to pass the torch was the right thing to do.

LNP issued a statement asking President Biden to step aside and not run for re-election, with a private letter from 168 business professionals.

In the statement, LNP described the possibility of a second Trump term “an existential threat to American democracy”. The statement noted that at the first presidential debate in Atlanta, Mr. Biden “failed to effectively make the case against Trump, and we now fear the risk of a devastating loss in November.”

In September 2024, LNP endorsed Kamala Harris for president.

In October 2024, The Financial Times quoted Ballou-Aares of LNP in its article titled Kamala Harris's Wall Street charm offensive begins to pay off as saying: "People had been staying out, giving to congressional campaigns and preparing for the worst . . . they are now engaged."

== 2025 activities ==
It conducted a poll with Harris in April among business leaders, a majority of whom expressed varying degrees of concern about the impact of the tariffs on the U.S. economy's global standing and health.

It issued an open letter in June signed among others by LinkedIn founder Reid Hoffman, former Unilever CEO Paul Polman, former American Airlines CEO Robert Crandall, John E. Pepper Jr., Jeni Britton, and Tom Florsheim. The letter criticized the Trump administration's education policy, including visa restrictions on students and Trump's attacks on various universities.

Florsheim, Anoop Prakash, and David Lubar wrote an op-ed in the Milwaukee Journal Sentinel supporting Susan Crawford in the 2025 Wisconsin Supreme Court election.

In April, Florsheim was quoted in an AP story on Trump's on-again-off-again tariffs. In August, Bloomberg Businessweek reported LNP's work to counter partisan gerrymandering efforts in states such as Wisconsin. LNP has worked with officials in New York to stop the deployment of federal forces in New York City. A Harris poll conducted in October revealed widespread concern among senior business leaders about the impact of the current political and legal climate.

LNP highlights candidates in each election cycle and it has released the names of the Congressional candidates it recommends for the 2026 election cycle.

== Awards ==
The Leadership Now Project won an Anthem Award in 2024 for its work in Ohio and Wisconsin.
