= Ameelio =

U.S. technology non-profit organization

Ameelio is a technology non-profit which provides free communications and educational tools for incarcerated communities and their relatives. It is the first non-profit telecommunications company to provide free prison communication services in the United States.

== History ==
Ameelio was co-founded in 2020 by two Yale students, Uzoma "Zo" Orchingwa and Gabriel Saruhashi, to allow incarcerated people in the United States to access free communications services. Orchingwa and Saruhashi were motivated to found the organization because of the extremely high cost and inaccessibility of communications in prison, which worsened during the COVID-19 pandemic. At launch, it allowed users to send photos and physical print-outs of digital letters to inmates, it later expanded its services to include teleconferencing. The organization received funding from Jack Dorsey, Eric Schmidt, Vinod Khosla, Kevin P. Ryan, Rich Barton, Devin Wenig, and Jack Smith.

Ameelio currently supports free communications for incarcerated individuals and their families in the states of Iowa, Colorado, and Maine.
