= Shelli Taylor =

American business executive

Shelli Taylor is an American business executive who has served as the CEO of Alamo Drafthouse Cinema since 2020. A graduate of University of California, Riverside, Taylor served as an executive at several corporations including twenty years at Starbucks before she replaced Alamo Drafthouse founder Tim League as CEO.
