= Tim Ryan (businessman) =

American business executive

- Born: Timothy F. Ryan; Circa. 1965 (age 59–60); Boston, Massachusetts, United States
- Occupation: Business executive
- Known for: Activism on Diversity, equity, and inclusion within the corporate world
- Children: 6

Tim Ryan is an American business executive who is the head of technology and business enablement at Citigroup. He was formerly the United States senior partner and chairman of PricewaterhouseCoopers.

== Early life ==
Ryan grew up in Hyde Park and Dedham, Massachusetts. He worked for Roche Bros. while in high school and college.

== Career ==
Ryan joined PwC after graduating Babson College.

In 2016, he became the United States senior partner of PwC.

In 2024 he left PwC to join Citigroup as their head of technology and business enablement.

== Activism ==
Ryan gained recognition in 2021 for his activism toward workplace inclusion and diversity. In 2017 as a senior partner, Ryan's initial mission was to transform the diversity and inclusion policies within PwC after he was prompted by a black employee's internal email which called out the workplace's lack of discussion about what was happening culturally in America to people of color. (This followed the fatal shootings of Philando Castillo and Alton Sterling in the summer of 2016.)

After advocating internally, he founded, on behalf of PwC, the CEO Action for Diversity & Inclusion™ pledge. To date, the pledge has garnered more than 1,600 signatures from Fortune 500 companies and progressive executives.

== Personal life ==
Ryan resides in Walpole, Massachusetts. He has six children, three daughters and three sons and a brother named Pat.
