= Noom =

American company offering weight loss and wellness services

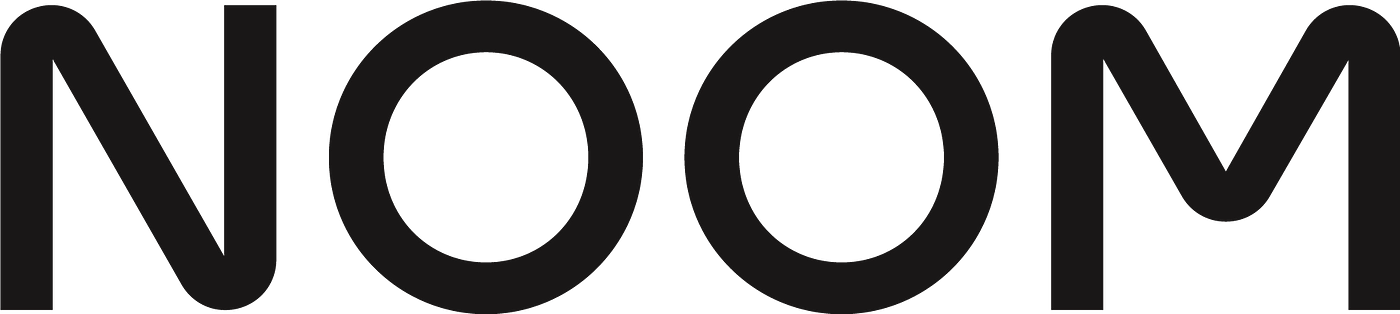
- Type: Private
- Founded: 2008; 18 years ago
- Headquarters: Princeton, New Jersey, U.S.
- Key people: Saeju Jeong (Co-founder and Executive Chairman); Artem Petakov (Co-founder and Head of Noom Ventures); Geoff Cook (Chief Executive Officer)
- Website: www.noom.com

Noom is an American privately held digital health company that provides weight management and behavioral health services through a subscription-based mobile application. Founded in 2008, the company combines behavior change psychology with access to weight loss medications and dietary supplements.

The platform incorporates elements of cognitive behavioral therapy (CBT) and goal-setting strategies, and its programs are designed to support users in developing healthier habits. In addition to its weight management services, Noom has expanded to offer products related to stress management and general wellness.

Noom has received both praise and criticism. Supporters cite its focus on mental and behavioral aspects of health, while critics have raised concerns about the accuracy of its calorie goals, the use of algorithmically determined weight loss targets, and questions about the qualifications of some of its coaching staff.

== History ==
Noom was founded in 2008 by friends Artem Petakov and Saeju Jeong. The company's mobile app officially launched in 2016. In 2019, Noom partnered with Novo Nordisk to offer one year of free access to its platform for patients prescribed the diabetes medication Saxenda. Noom reported $400 million in revenue in 2020. As of April 2021, the company stated it employed approximately 3,000 people, including 2,700 coaches. Petakov, a former software engineer at Google, currently leads Noom Ventures, while Jeong serves as Noom's Chairman. In 2023, Geoff Cook was appointed CEO of Noom. In 2024, Noom relocated its headquarters from New York City to Princeton, New Jersey.

== Services ==
=== Noom App ===
The Noom app is the primary platform through which users engage with the company's services. Upon creating an account, users provide physical information such as weight, height, and age, along with experiential data including lifestyle habits, personal goals, and perceived obstacles.

Users log their meals and physical activity to receive feedback through algorithmically generated insights, human coaches, peer interactions, educational articles, and interactive quizzes. The app has been reviewed by media outlets, including the Chicago Tribune, USA Today, WebMD, and Good Housekeeping.

=== Other services ===
In 2024, Noom launched Noom Vibe, a mobile application that tracks healthy habits and awards points for them, termed "vibes." That same year, Noom added a 3D body scanning feature to its main app, which is intended to help users track lean muscle mass, and it began offering a compounded GLP-1 medication. This formulation includes semaglutide, the same active ingredient found in the anti-obesity medications Wegovy and Ozempic.

== Research ==
In 2016, a study published in Scientific Reports analyzed data from approximately 36,000 users of the Noom app, of whom 78% were female and 22% male. The data were collected between October 2012 and April 2014. To be included in the analysis, users had to log their weight at least twice per month over a period of six consecutive months. The study found that 78% of participants self-reported weight loss while using the app. The median duration of weight reporting was 267 days (approximately nine months). The frequency of data logging was positively correlated with weight loss. Additionally, male users had a higher average starting BMI and reported greater average weight loss compared to female users.

In 2017, the Centers for Disease Control and Prevention (CDC) recognized Noom as a certified diabetes prevention program, making it the first mobile health application to receive such designation.

== Criticisms ==
=== Health programs ===
Noom has been criticized for promoting elements of diet culture in its advertising campaigns. The app has also faced criticism for setting calorie goals that some users and experts have deemed inappropriately low, and for employing coaches who may lack formal qualifications as registered dietitians. Coaching has been described as relying heavily on canned responses.

Upon sign-up, users are prompted to complete a questionnaire consisting of over 50 questions, which is used to generate a personalized program. In 2021, the UK-based organization Privacy International alleged that Noom, along with other diet platforms, used such lengthy surveys to attract users but did not always tailor the resulting programs to the collected data. The organization claimed that many users received the same or highly similar programs regardless of their answers. It also raised concerns about the handling of potentially sensitive health data, alleging a lack of transparency regarding the sharing of such data with third parties, including Facebook, potentially in violation of the European General Data Protection Regulation (GDPR).

In a follow-up investigation in 2023, Privacy International reported that Noom had made "significant positive changes" to its data handling practices. However, the organization noted that data was still being shared with Facebook and concluded that "there is still room for improvement."

=== Billing issues lawsuit ===
In August 2020, the Better Business Bureau (BBB) issued a warning to consumers regarding Noom's subscription practices. The BBB reported that numerous customers had filed complaints about difficulties canceling their subscriptions after the free trial period, as well as challenges in contacting the company to request refunds.

In February 2022, Noom agreed to a $62 million settlement in a class-action lawsuit that alleged the company had used deceptive billing practices related to automatic subscription renewals. Qualifying claimants received approximately $167 each. During the case, a former senior software engineer at Noom testified that the cancellation process was intentionally designed to be difficult, with the goal of generating revenue from customers who failed to cancel in time. In response, Noom stated that it had taken steps to improve transparency around its pricing and policies, including the implementation of self-service cancellation tools.

== See also ==
- List of diets
