= Affectiva =

Artificial intelligence company

- Type: Private
- Industry: Software, artificial intelligence
- Founded: Massachusetts, United States (2009)
- Founders: Rana el Kaliouby (CEO & co-founder); Rosalind W. Picard (co-founder)
- Fate: Acquired by SmartEye
- Headquarters: Boston, Massachusetts, United States
- Number of locations: Boston, Massachusetts and Cairo, Egypt
- Products: Affectiva Automotive AI, Affectiva Media Analytics
- Services: Emotion AI
- Total equity: (venture capital) $53 million
- Number of employees: 100–150
- Website: affectiva.com

Affectiva is an artificial intelligence software development company based in Boston, Massachusetts. An offshoot of MIT Media Lab, Affectiva created a new technological category of artificial emotional intelligence, namely, Emotion AI.

The company claimed its AI understood human emotions, cognitive states, activities and the objects people use, by analyzing facial and vocal expressions.In 2021, the company was acquired by SmartEye.

== History ==
Affectiva was co-founded by Rana el Kaliouby, who became chief executive officer on May 25, 2016, and Rosalind W. Picard, who worked as chairman and Chief Scientist until 2013. Both of Affectiva's early products grew out of collaborative research at the MIT's Media Lab to help people on the autism spectrum.

In May 2021, Affectiva was acquired for a mostly-stock deal of $73.5m by Swedish SmartEye, a former competitor.

== Technology ==
The company has expanded its Emotion AI technology to detect more than facial expressions, reactions and emotions. Affectiva's software detects complex and nuanced emotions, cognitive states, such as drowsiness and distraction, certain activities and the objects people use. It does that by analyzing the human face, vocal intonations and body posture.

Affectiva's AI is built with deep learning, computer vision, and large amounts of data that has been collected in real-world scenarios. The AI uses an optical sensor like a webcam or smartphone camera to identify a human face in real-time. Then, computer vision algorithms identify key features on the face, which are analyzed by deep learning algorithms to classify facial expressions. These facial expressions are then mapped back to emotions. One journal paper found the Affectiva iMotions Facial Expression Analysis Software results are comparable to results using facial Electromyography. Affectiva also uses computer vision to detect objects like a cellphone and car seat, as well as body key points, which track body joints to determine movement and location.

Affectiva has collected massive amounts of data that are used to train and test the company's deep learning algorithms, and provide insight into human emotional reactions and engagement. The company has analyzed more than 19 million face videos from for than 90 countries, making it one of the largest data repositories of its kind.

=== Applications ===
Affectiva's AI had many applications, but the company's primary focus is on Media Analytics. Other uses of Affectiva's AI includes applications in automotive, healthcare and mental health, robotics, conversational interfaces, education, gaming, and more.

==== Media analytics ====
Affectiva's technology was first deployed in media analytics, for market research purposes. The company had since then tested more than 100,000 ads in more than 90 countries. Brands, advertising agencies and insights firms used the company's Emotion AI to measure the unfiltered and unbiased emotional responses consumers have when viewing video ads and movie trailers. These insights helped improve brand and media content, and predict key metrics in advertising such as sales lift, purchase intent and virality. Affectiva's technology was also used in qualitative research.

Affectiva had partnered with leading insights firms such as Kantar, LRW, Added Value and Unruly. Through these collaborations, 28 percent of the Fortune Global 500 companies, and 70 percent of the world's largest advertisers, used Affectiva's Emotion AI.

On September 5, 2019, Affectiva announced the appointment of Graham Page, a seasoned Kantar executive, as Global Managing Director of Media Analytics to expand on the company's existing footprint in the media analytics space.

==== Automotive ====
On March 21, 2018, Affectiva launched Affectiva Automotive AI, a system designed to monitor the condition of drivers and passengers, in real-time, using in-vehicle cameras.

The technology was intended to help car manufacturers, fleet management companies and rideshare providers improve road safety and build better driver monitoring systems.Affectiva Automotive AI could also detect contextual cabin information such as the number of passengers, where they are sitting, and if an object is present.

Affectiva worked with a number of leading car manufacturers and transportation technology companies, including Hyundai Kia,Porsche, and BMW.

== See also ==
- Affective science
