= Alamo Drafthouse Cinema =

American movie theater chain

- Logo used since 2018

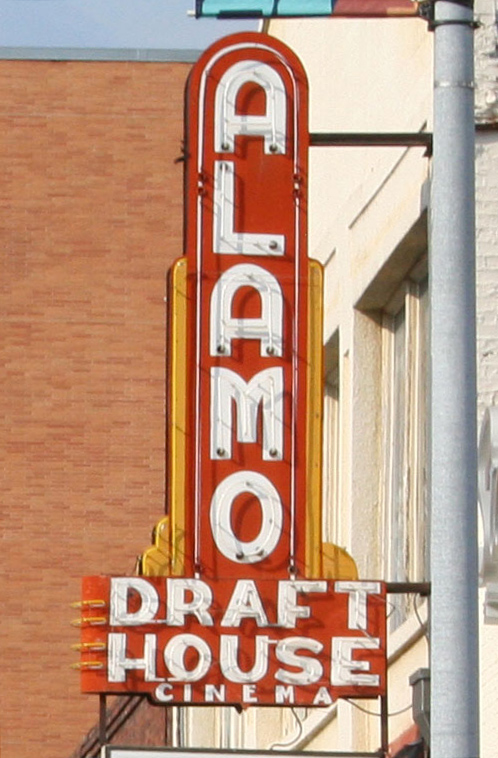
- Original Alamo Drafthouse Cinema in Downtown Austin
- Type: Subsidiary
- Industry: Entertainment
- Founded: 1997; 29 years ago
- Founder: Tim League; Karrie League
- Headquarters: Austin, Texas, U.S.
- Number of locations: 39
- Key people: Tim League (Chairman); Michael Kustermann (CEO)
- Owner: Altamont Capital Partners (2018–2024); Fortress Investment Group (2021–2024); Sony Pictures Experiences (2024–present)
- Website: drafthouse.com

The Alamo Drafthouse Cinema is an American cinema chain founded in 1997 in Austin, Texas, which is famous for serving dinner and drinks during the film, as well as its strict policy of requiring audiences to maintain proper cinema-going etiquette. Sony Pictures Experiences acquired the chain in June 2024.

The cinema chain has multiple locations across the United States, including 14 in Texas. There are five locations in Virginia (Winchester; Charlottesville; Woodbridge; Crystal City; and Ashburn); four in New York (Yonkers; Brooklyn; Staten Island; and Lower Manhattan); and California (San Francisco; Los Angeles; Mountain View; and Santa Clara); three locations in Colorado (Denver; Westminster; and Littleton); and two locations in Missouri (St. Louis and Springfield). There are seven additional locations: Chicago; Washington, D.C.; La Vista; Raleigh; Boston; Woodbury; and Indianapolis.

Planned future locations include Grand Prairie, Texas and Los Angeles, California.

== History ==
The Alamo Drafthouse Cinema was founded by Rice University alums Karrie and Tim League at 409 Colorado St, in an Austin, Texas warehouse district building that was being used as a parking garage. It was their second attempt at operating a movie theater; the Leagues had relocated to Austin after spending two years operating the unsuccessful Tejon Theater in Bakersfield, California.

The company began as a second-run movie theater. It distinguished itself by the food and drink service offered inside the theater, including cold beers, which continues to set Alamo Drafthouse apart from many other cinemas. The seating is arranged with rows of cabaret-style tables in front of each row of seats, with an aisle between each row to accommodate waitstaff service. Customers write their orders on slips of paper, which servers pick up.

Soon after opening, the original downtown theater began offering occasional unique programming such as silent movies scored by local bands playing live accompaniment, food-themed films such as Like Water for Chocolate served with a dinner matching the meals shown on screen, and retrospectives of various directors and stars.

In 2001, the Leagues renovated a four-screen art-house theater at 2700 Anderson Lane in North Austin called Village Cinema, which had recently closed, and opened it as an Alamo Drafthouse which specialized in first-run movies. With this new Alamo Drafthouse Village, the downtown location ceased showing second-run movies and began to concentrate almost exclusively on unusual programming, including classics, cult classics, independents, documentaries, special guest appearances, movie mockery and audience participation shows.

In 2003, the Alamo Drafthouse, under the direction of CEO Terrell Braly, opened on 13729 Research Boulevard in northwest Austin. The Alamo Drafthouse Lake Creek had seven screens, all dedicated to new movies. In May of that year, the Alamo granted their first franchise, which opened in the West Oaks Mall in Houston, Texas with six screens.

In July 2004, Tim and Karrie League sold the brand, including the brand name, intellectual property, and rights to all future Alamo Drafthouse expansion to the Alamo Drafthouse Cinemas CEO Terrell Braly, John Martin, and David Kennedy, but retained an irrevocable license for the Austin locations (Village, Lamar, Downtown), which includes their Rolling Roadshow.

In August 2004, the second largest Alamo (Westlakes) opened in San Antonio, Texas, with eight screens.

In August 2005, Entertainment Weekly named the Alamo Drafthouse Cinema "The #1 movie theater in the country doing it right".

Since February 2005, the new company has purchased the original franchise unit from Doss, opened a theater in the Katy Area and in Spring, Texas, and built a new-build multi-screen theater in the Rio Grande Valley; though it was announced in 2006 to open, the building has remained unfinished since the original owner was foreclosed upon.

In 2006, due to rising rent in downtown Austin, theater owners took steps to hand the theater over to a non-profit group called the "Heroes of the Alamo" foundation, operating the theater as a cultural arts center. However, with the historic Ritz Theater on 6th Street offered as an alternative location, the original Alamo was closed. The final event at the original site consisted of a special triple-feature event on the evening of June 27, 2007. The final movie shown was Night Warning, with star Susan Tyrrell attending. After the movie, audience members were allowed to disassemble their seats and take them home as souvenirs of the theater.

Of the first seven theaters, the downtown Austin theater was unique for being the host of many important film events in Austin, such as the Quentin Tarantino Film Festival and Harry Knowles's annual Butt-numb-a-thon.

After six months of construction, the Alamo Drafthouse at the Ritz opened on November 2, 2007, with a triple feature of Matango: Attack of the Mushroom People, with a five-course mushroom feast; a sneak preview of No Country For Old Men; and a Terror Thursday screening of War of the Gargantuas, introduced by Quentin Tarantino who flew out from Los Angeles for the night to attend the opening.

In 2009, the first outside of Texas was opened in Winchester, Virginia.

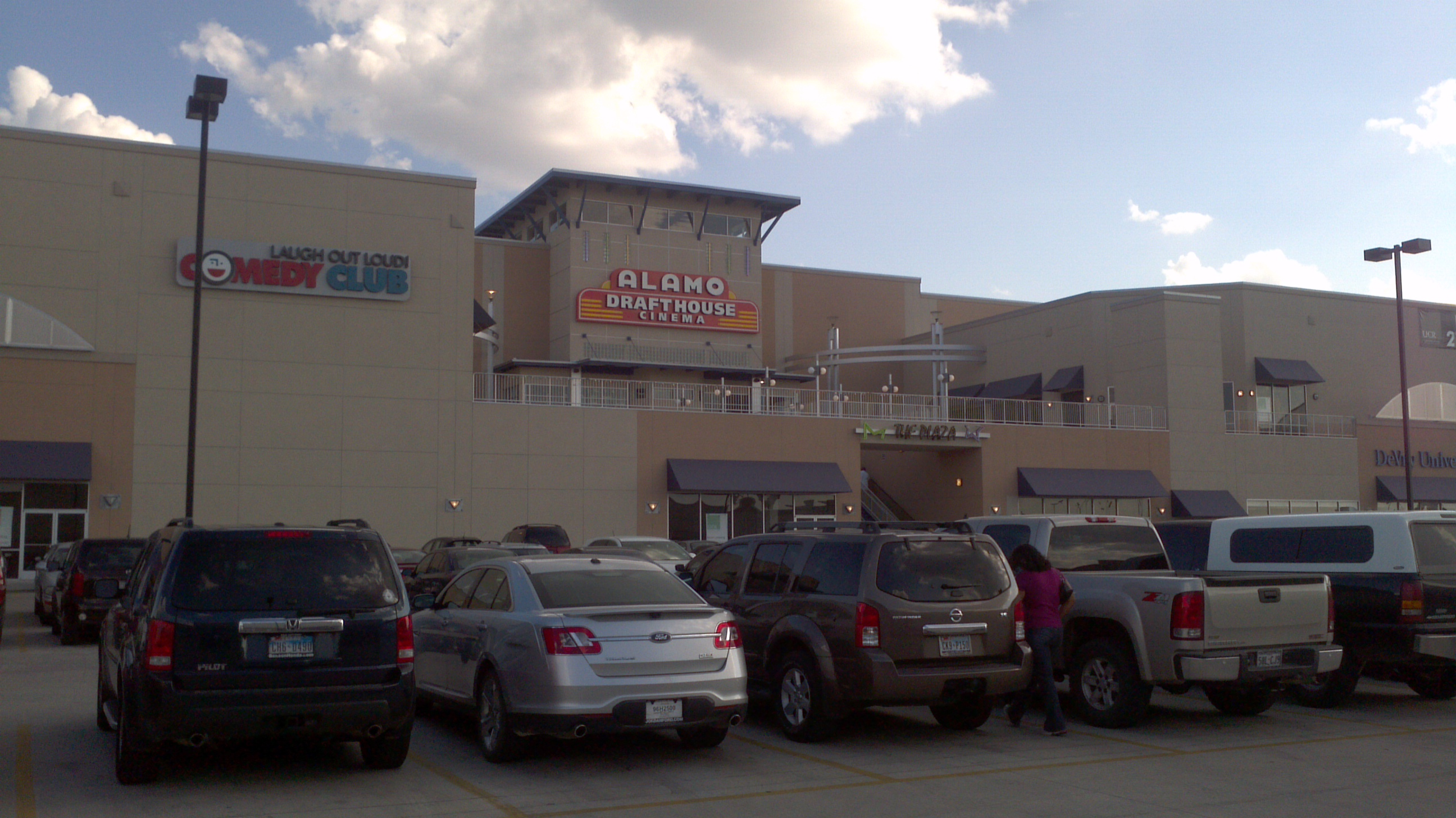
ParkNorth Mall, Uptown San Antonio, Texas

A second San Antonio theater opened in 2009 (Park North), with six screens. In June 2010, founder Tim League was brought back as CEO of the franchise operations. A third San Antonio location (Stone Oak) opened on November 5, 2010, with six screens. In 2013, the Lake Creek location was closed upon the opening of the brand new, larger Lakeline location. In June 2017, the current largest Alamo opened in Springfield, Missouri with 14 screens seating 1,050 people.

In 2017, the Austin Independent School District approved the sale of the former Baker School to Alamo Drafthouse founders Tim and Karrie League. Their proposal included converting the school into the company's headquarters and building housing on the property, including affordable homes. In 2020, Austin City Council approved the purchase of land intended for the housing development for a flood-control project. KUT reported in May 2022 that the affordable housing had not been built.

In March 2019, Business Insider reported that Alamo Drafthouse's movie-ticket subscription service, Alamo Season Pass, will launch nationwide at all Drafthouse theaters by the end of the year with the unlimited plan costing $20 a month in most regions of the country.

In March 2020, Alamo Drafthouse announced that all locations were closed temporarily due to the COVID-19 pandemic.

In May 2020, Alamo announced that former Starbucks executive Shelli Taylor would become the new CEO of Alamo Drafthouse and that founder Tim League would transfer from his current role as CEO to become the chairman of the board of directors.

The company announced the launch of the "Alamo on Demand" video streaming service on May 7, 2020. With a video-on-demand platform provided by Shift72, the streaming service will have films from Drafthouse Films, its film distribution arm, as well as partner with name-brand studios like Sony Pictures Classics and Lionsgate.

On March 3, 2021, Alamo Drafthouse filed for Chapter 11 bankruptcy protection. As part of its restructuring, locations across the southern U.S. were closed, and plans to open an Orlando, Florida location were cancelled. The debtors were represented by Young Conaway Stargatt & Taylor as counsel and Houlihan Lokey as investment banker. With $100 million to $500 million in both assets and liabilities, Alamo entered into a restructuring support agreement to help guide them through their bankruptcy. In June 2021, the company announced that they had emerged from bankruptcy.

In July 2023, Michael Kustermann succeeded Shelli Taylor as chief executive officer.

In October 2023, Emergency Workplace Organizing Committee volunteers helped organize dine-in cinema workers at the Alamo Drafthouse in Lower Manhattan. Workers voted to unionize with United Auto Workers (UAW) Local 2179.

In June 2024, all Alamo Drafthouse locations in the Dallas-Fort Worth area were shuttered, as well as the company's only Minnesota location in Woodbury, as the operator that franchised these locations filed for Chapter 7 bankruptcy. The franchisee, Two is One, One is None, LLC, blamed high leasing rents as part of the decision. On June 27, 2024, it was announced these locations would be acquired by Alamo Drafthouse and resumed operation in the summer.

On June 12, 2024, Sony Pictures acquired Alamo Drafthouse. The financial terms were not disclosed. Sony Pictures had previously owned the Loews Theatres chain after the U.S. Department of Justice relaxed enforcement of the United States v. Paramount Pictures, Inc. federal ruling orders in 1985. Alamo Drafthouse continues to operate their film festival, Fantastic Fest, which is included in the acquisition. Not long after the purchase by Sony, Alamo Drafthouse was revealed as the replacement tenant for two shuttered Showplace Icon locations in Santa Clara and Mountain View, California, expanding the company's Northern California presence to three locations.

On January 14, 2025, Alamo Drafthouse carried out mass layoffs at all levels of the company, with corporate as well as hourly staff at venues being particularly affected. The layoffs came despite reports of strong performance in 2024 and plans to open additional venues. Though the layoffs came only seven months after Sony's acquisition of Alamo Drafthouse, the decision has been described as "an Alamo decision, not a mandate from Sony". On February 3, 2025, more than one hundred Alamo Drafthouse employees were laid off at Manhattan, Brooklyn and Colorado locations.

On February 14, 2025, employees at the Manhattan, Brooklyn, and Colorado locations walked out in the middle of their shifts and went on strike in response to the layoffs. The Colorado locations, represented by the Communications Workers of America Local 7777 union, went back to work after four days. The strike at the Manhattan and Brooklyn locations, represented by the UAW Local 2179 union, ended after 58 days, resulting in the reinstatement of laid off workers, their accrued paid time-off, and seniority. Both unions have filed unfair labor practice charges with the National Labor Relations Board citing bad faith bargaining during negotiations.

In 2025, employees at the Slaughter Lane location in Austin voted 52–16 to join the United Auto Workers. Workers cited wages and layoffs among their reasons for organizing.

In July of 2026, Alamo Drafthouse Cinema announced the acquisition of the former ArcLight Hollywood and Cinerama Dome locations in Los Angeles and plans to reopen the complex by early 2028. The former ArcLight will reopen as the Alamo Drafthouse Hollywood, while the Cinerama Dome will retain its name.

== Locations ==
Italics indicate location has not officially opened yet.

=== California ===
- Alamo Drafthouse Los Angeles – The Bloc, Los Angeles (opened July 19, 2019, includes Video Vortex video rental store)
- Alamo Drafthouse Hollywood – Hollywood, Los Angeles (opening 2028, includes Cinerama Dome)
- Alamo Drafthouse Mountain View – The Village at San Antonio, Mountain View (opened June 16, 2025)
- Alamo Drafthouse San Francisco – New Mission Theater, San Francisco (opened December 17, 2015, includes Video Vortex video rental store)
- Alamo Drafthouse Santa Clara – Westfield Valley Fair, Santa Clara (opened June 23, 2025)

=== Colorado ===
- Alamo Drafthouse at Aspen Grove – Littleton (7 screens, opened March 2013)
- Alamo Drafthouse Sloan Lake – Denver (8 screens, opened May 2017)
- Alamo Drafthouse Westminster – Westminster (9 screens, opened Spring 2019)

=== District of Columbia ===
- Alamo Drafthouse D.C. Bryant Street (9 screens, opened December 2021)

=== Illinois ===
- Alamo Drafthouse Chicago (Wrigleyville, Chicago, Illinois, 6 screens, opened early 2023, includes Video Vortex video rental store)

=== Indiana ===
- Alamo Drafthouse Indianapolis (Indianapolis, Indiana, 13 screens, opened November 2024)

=== Massachusetts ===
- Alamo Drafthouse Boston (Seaport, Boston, Massachusetts, 10 screens, opened late 2023)

=== Minnesota ===
- Alamo Drafthouse Twin Cities – Woodbury (9 screens; opened summer 2018; closed June 2024; reopened August 2024)

=== Missouri ===
- Alamo Drafthouse Springfield (14 screens; opened June 2017)
- Alamo Drafthouse City Foundry – St. Louis (10 screens; opened December 2022)

=== Nebraska ===
- Alamo Drafthouse Omaha – La Vista (8 screens; opened October 31, 2015)

=== New York ===
==== New York City ====
- Alamo Drafthouse Downtown Brooklyn – Brooklyn in City Point (Originally 7 screens, opened October 28, 2016, expanded to 12 screens in 2024, includes Video Vortex video rental store)
- Alamo Drafthouse Lower Manhattan – Financial District of Manhattan (14 screens, opened October 18, 2021, includes Kim's Video Underground video rental store)
- Alamo Drafthouse Staten Island (9 screens, opened July 22, 2022)

==== Other New York cities ====
- Alamo Drafthouse Yonkers (6 screens; opened August 5, 2013 includes Video Vortex video store)

=== North Carolina ===
- Alamo Drafthouse Raleigh (11 screens, opened early 2018, includes Video Vortex video rental store)

=== Texas ===
==== Austin ====
- Alamo Drafthouse Village (4 screens; opened July 2001, includes Video Vortex video rental store)
- Alamo Drafthouse South Lamar (6 screens; opened March 7, 2005, closed January 3, 2013, as the rest of the 1950s Lamar Plaza shopping center was demolished and rebuilt around the existing Alamo Drafthouse building. Reopened in the third quarter of 2014 with expanded space bringing screens to 9. In 2023, a 10th screen was added in what used to be the large lobby.)
- Alamo Drafthouse Slaughter Lane (8 screens; opened on March 8, 2012)
- Alamo Drafthouse Lakeline (10 screens; opened July 2013)
- Alamo Drafthouse at Mueller (6 screens; opened March 2017), renamed the Matthew McConaughey Cinema in August 2026

==== San Antonio ====
- Alamo Drafthouse Park North (6 screens; opened November 2009)
- Alamo Drafthouse Stone Oak (6 screens; opened on or after November 5, 2010)

==== Dallas–Fort Worth ====
- Alamo Drafthouse Grand Prairie (10 screens, opening TBA)
- Alamo Drafthouse Richardson (7 screens; opened August 2013 as first Dallas–Fort Worth area location, temporarily closed June 2024, reopened August 2024)
- Alamo Drafthouse The Cedars (8 screens; opened 2016, temporarily closed June 2024, reopened August 2024)
- Alamo Drafthouse Las Colinas (opened April 2018, temporarily closed June 2024, reopened August 2024)
- Alamo Drafthouse Lake Highlands (opened March 2018, temporarily closed June 2024, reopened August 2024)
- Alamo Drafthouse Denton (opened June 2018, temporarily closed June 2024, reopened August 2024)

==== Other Texas cities ====
- Alamo Drafthouse Laredo (7 screens; opened September 4, 2015)
- Alamo Drafthouse Corpus Christi (7 screens; opened February 2017)

=== Virginia ===
==== Northern Virginia ====
- Alamo Drafthouse One Loudoun – Ashburn (9 screens; opened April 2013)
- Alamo Drafthouse – Woodbridge (8 screens, opened June 2018)
- Alamo Drafthouse Crystal City – Crystal City (9 screens, opened October 2022)

==== Other Virginia cities ====
- Alamo Drafthouse Winchester – Kernstown (8 screens; opened October 2009)
- Alamo Drafthouse – Charlottesville (7 screens, opened July 2017)

=== Worldwide ===
- Alamo Drafthouse Rolling Roadshow – Mobile unit operates worldwide

=== Former locations ===
==== Arizona ====
- As of September 2021, all three locations were rebranded as Majestic Theaters.
- Alamo Drafthouse Phoenix – Chandler (Planned eight-screen location in downtown Chandler, AZ, abandoned due to construction issues, development taken over by Harkins Theatres. Alamo Holdings LLC later inked a $14.6 million lease on a location in south Chandler which opened on December 2, 2016)
- Alamo Drafthouse Tempe (opened early 2018)
- Alamo Drafthouse Gilbert (8 screens, opened November 2019)

==== Florida ====
- Alamo Drafthouse Naples (11 screens, opened April 2024, closed September 9, 2026)

==== Missouri ====
- Alamo Drafthouse Mainstreet – Kansas City (6 screens; took over operations from AMC Theatres June 21, 2012; closure announced as part of bankruptcy restructuring in March 2021)

==== Michigan ====
- Alamo Drafthouse Kalamazoo (10 screens; closed April 2017)

==== Nebraska ====
- Alamo Drafthouse Midtown – Omaha (5 screens; opened Winter 2018; closed October 2022)

==== Texas ====
- Alamo Drafthouse Downtown – Austin (single screen; opened 1997, closed 2007 to move to the Ritz location)
- Alamo Drafthouse Lake Creek – Austin (7 screens; opened May 2003; closed July 2013)
- Alamo Drafthouse West Oaks Mall – Houston (6 screens; opened May 2003 as the first Houston area location, closed June 25, 2012)
- Alamo Drafthouse Vintage Park – Spring (7 screens; opened February 2013; sold December 6, 2016)
- Alamo Drafthouse Mason Park – Katy Area (7 screens; opened February 2006, closed June 2018, replaced by the LaCenterra location)
- Alamo Drafthouse at the Ritz – Austin (2 screens; opened November 2007; closure announced as part of the bankruptcy restructuring in March 2021) - Now the home of Joe Rogan's comedy club Comedy Mothership
- Alamo Drafthouse Marketplace – New Braunfels (11 screens; opened December 20, 2013; closure announced as part of the bankruptcy restructuring in March 2021)
- Alamo Drafthouse Westlakes – San Antonio (9 screens; opened August 2004 as the first San Antonio area location; closed mid-2021)
- Alamo Drafthouse North Richland Hills (8 screens, opened April 2019; closed February 2021)
- Alamo Drafthouse Montecillo Town Center – El Paso (8 screens; opened May 6, 2016; closed February 7, 2026) (Note: The former locations in El Paso, Katy, and Lubbock were all owned by Triple Tap Ventures LLC. These locations reopened as Flix Brewhouse theaters by May 2026.)
- Alamo Drafthouse East El Paso (10 screens; opened March 24, 2021; closed February 7, 2026)
- Alamo Drafthouse Lubbock (8 screens; opened April 25, 2014; closed February 7, 2026)
- Alamo Drafthouse LaCenterra – Katy (8 screens, replacing previous Mason Park location, July 2018; closed February 7, 2026)

=== Cancelled expansions ===
==== Alabama ====
- Alamo Drafthouse Birmingham, Alabama (planned for 2022, cancelled in January 2024)

==== Arkansas ====
- Alamo Drafthouse Fayetteville, Arkansas (8 screens; planned to be Alamo's first permanent drive-in location for 2023, cancelled in March 2025)

==== Colorado ====
- Alamo Drafthouse Glendale, Colorado (planned for 2027 opening, cancelled March 2025)

==== Florida ====
- Alamo Drafthouse Orlando (cancelled March 2021)

==== Michigan ====
- Alamo Drafthouse Midtown Detroit (9 screens; planned for 2020, cancelled late 2019)

==== Texas ====
- Alamo Drafthouse Little Elm (8 screens; planned expansion abandoned in February 2016)
- An additional location was also being planned for the Houston area in December 2016.
- Alamo Drafthouse Cedar Park (10 screens; planned in 2018)
- Alamo Drafthouse La Cantera La Cantera, San Antonio (sold the land for the expansion in fall 2021)
- Alamo Drafthouse Sugar Land
- Alamo Drafthouse League City
- Alamo Drafthouse Frisco (would have included a Video Vortex video rental store)

== Etiquette ==
Alamo Drafthouse is famous for enforcing a strict policy on behavior while in the theater. Children under the age of two are not allowed, except for showings on specific days designated "Alamo For All", where parents are encouraged to bring young children, and rules around talking are relaxed. Unaccompanied minors are not allowed in showings, except for members of the Alamo Drafthouse's Victory Vanguard rewards program, which allows 15–17 year-olds to attend showings unattended after their application to the rewards program has been submitted and reviewed. The application involves demonstrating an understanding of the theater's policies around talking, texting, arriving late, and basic tipping etiquette.

The cinema also prohibits talking and texting during the film. Anyone who violates this policy is subject to warning and potential removal from the premises. Alamo made national headlines in 2011 when the rantings of one angry customer who was ejected for texting were included in its "Don't Talk or Text" PSA shown before films. "When we adopted our strict no-talking policy back in 1997, we knew we were going to alienate some of our patrons," Tim League posted on the cinema's website. "That was the plan. If you can't change your behavior and be quiet (or unilluminated) during a movie, then we don't want you at our venue."

== Rolling Roadshow ==
Alamo Drafthouse hosts 35mm screenings of famous movies in famous places all over the world with their traveling portable projection system and a blow-up screen. Past events include: Fistful of Dollars at Cortijo el Sotillo, Spain, A Christmas Story in Cleveland, OH, The Lost Boys in Santa Cruz, CA, It Came From Outer Space 3D in Roswell, NM, The Goonies in Astoria, OR, Close Encounters of the Third Kind at Devil's Tower, WY, The Warriors in Coney Island, NY, Clerks in Red Bank, NJ, Jaws at Martha's Vineyard, MA, Field of Dreams at the Field of Dreams, IA, The Shining at the Stanley Hotel, CO, Poseidon Adventure on the Queen Mary, CA, Escape from Alcatraz on Alcatraz, CA, Bottle Rocket in Hillsboro, TX, just to name a few.

== Drafthouse Films ==
In 2010, after the return of former co-founder Tim League as CEO, the company launched Drafthouse Films, a film distribution company named after, and inspired by, the Alamo Drafthouse Cinema chain.

== Neon ==
In 2017, then CEO Tim League founded another film distribution company with Tom Quinn in New York City called Neon, which has earned a total of 12 Academy Award nominations. As of 2019, Tim League was reportedly not involved in the daily operations of Neon.

== Birth.Movies.Death. ==
Birth.Movies.Death. was a film magazine and website formerly published by Alamo Drafthouse. It was previously known as Badass Digest.

The sale of Birth.Movies.Death to Dallas Sonnier's Cinestate film studio was announced in May 2020 concurrently with the stepping down of founder Tim League as CEO of Alamo Drafthouse.

== Hostile workplace allegations ==
In October 2016, Devin Faraci resigned from Birth.Movies.Death. after allegations of sexual assault surfaced. Less than a year later, Tim League re-hired Faraci to write film blurbs for the 2017 Fantastic Fest. Upon discovery of Faraci's re-hiring, Todd Brown resigned as Fantastic Fest's director of international programming in early September 2017. Faraci resigned from writing for Fantastic Fest, and League made several public apologies regarding the matter.

Later in September 2017, several women accused Harry Knowles of sexual harassment and sexual assault at events sponsored by Alamo Drafthouse or in professional workplace settings. Subsequently, Alamo Drafthouse and Fantastic Fest severed business ties with Knowles. League did not attend Fantastic Fest, opting instead to visit Alamo Drafthouse locations around the country to discuss workplace environment issues with employees.

Also in 2017, Alamo Drafthouse exhibited Take It Out in Trade, a previously unreleased pornographic film by Ed Wood, to a "surprise" audience who had not been told about the film or its subject ahead of time.

== See also ==
- List of companies based in Austin, Texas
