= Autumn (given name) =

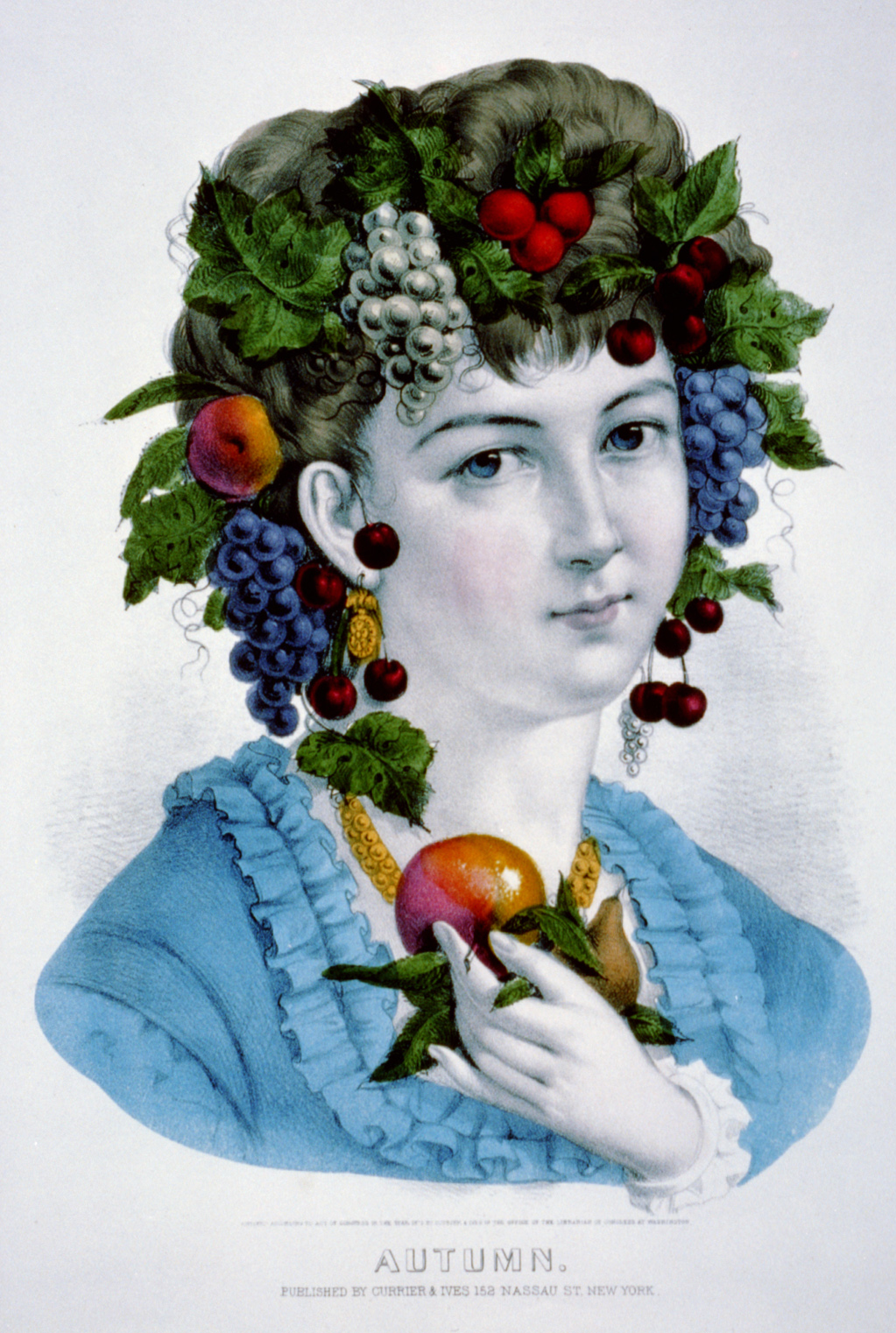
- The personification of Autumn from an 1871 Currier and Ives print.
- Pronunciation: Pronunciation in British English
- Gender: female
- Language: Latin and English

Origin
- Meaning: "fall" or "autumn"

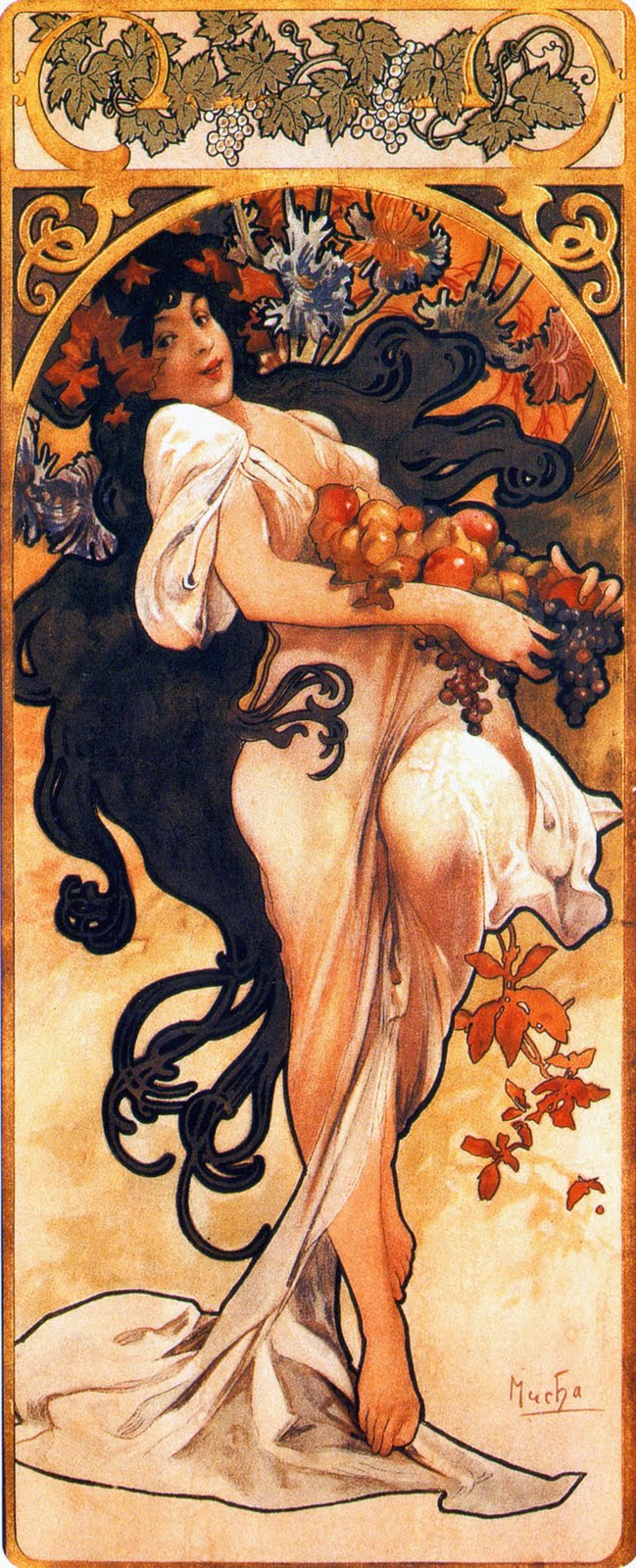
Autumn, an 1897 Art Nouveau illustration by Alfons Mucha.

Autumn is a feminine given name derived from the Latin word autumnus, meaning "fall" or "autumn".

The name has been in use in the United States since at least the 1870s, according to census records. It has been ranked among the top 100 names for girls there since 1997. Autumn was among the five most popular names given to newborn girls born to Black mothers in the United States state of Virginia in 2023. It has also been a popular name for girls in Canada, where it ranked 119th among the most popular names for newborn girls in 2021, and the United Kingdom in recent years. Historically, the name has been most common in the Northeastern United States and Canada, in regions with many deciduous trees that seasonally change color, which is considered highly attractive. The name has been less common in regions with less distinctive changes during the season.

== People named Autumn ==
- Autumn Adeigbo, American designer
- Autumn Bailey (born 1995), Canadian volleyball player
- Autumn Burke (born 1973), American politician
- Autumn Casey (born 1987), American visual artist
- Autumn Chiklis (born 1993), American actress and writer
- Autumn Christian, American author
- Autumn Daly, houseguest on the second season of Big Brother (US)
- Autumn de Forest (born 2001), American painter
- Autumn de Wilde (born 1970), American photographer
- Autumn Durald (born 1979), American cinematographer
- Autumn Federici, American model, producer, and actress
- Jennifer Blake (wrestler) (born 1983), also known by her ring-name Autumn Frost
- Autumn Fry (born 2012), American YouTuber
- Autumn Hurlbert (born 1980), American singer and actress
- Autumn Jackson (born 1974), American criminal
- Autumn Kent, American mathematician
- Autumn Knight (born 1980), American artist
- Autumn Lockwood, American football coach
- Autumn MacDougall (born 1997), Canadian ice hockey player
- Autumn Mills (born 1988), Canadian ice hockey player
- Autumn Peltier (born 2004), Canadian Anishinaabe climate activist
- Autumn Phillips (born 1978), Canadian wife of Peter Phillips, grandson of Queen Elizabeth II
- Autumn Rademacher (born 1975), American women's basketball coach, currently at the University of Detroit Mercy
- Autumn Reeser (born 1980), American actress
- Autumn Rowe (born 1981), American singer and songwriter
- Autumn Sandeen, American transgender activist and blogger
- Autumn Simunek, American beauty pageant titleholder
- Autumn Stanley (1933–2018), American patent historian
- Autumn Smithers (born 1997), American professional soccer player
- Autumn-Rain Stephens-Daly, New Zealand professional rugby league footballer
- Autumn Nelon Streetman (born 1997), American actress and vocalist
- Autumn Weeks (born 2001), American soccer player

== See also ==
- Autumn Rolfson, a Marvel Comics character and former member of Apocalypse's Horsemen
