= Francesco Nenci (artist) =

Italian painter (1781-1850)

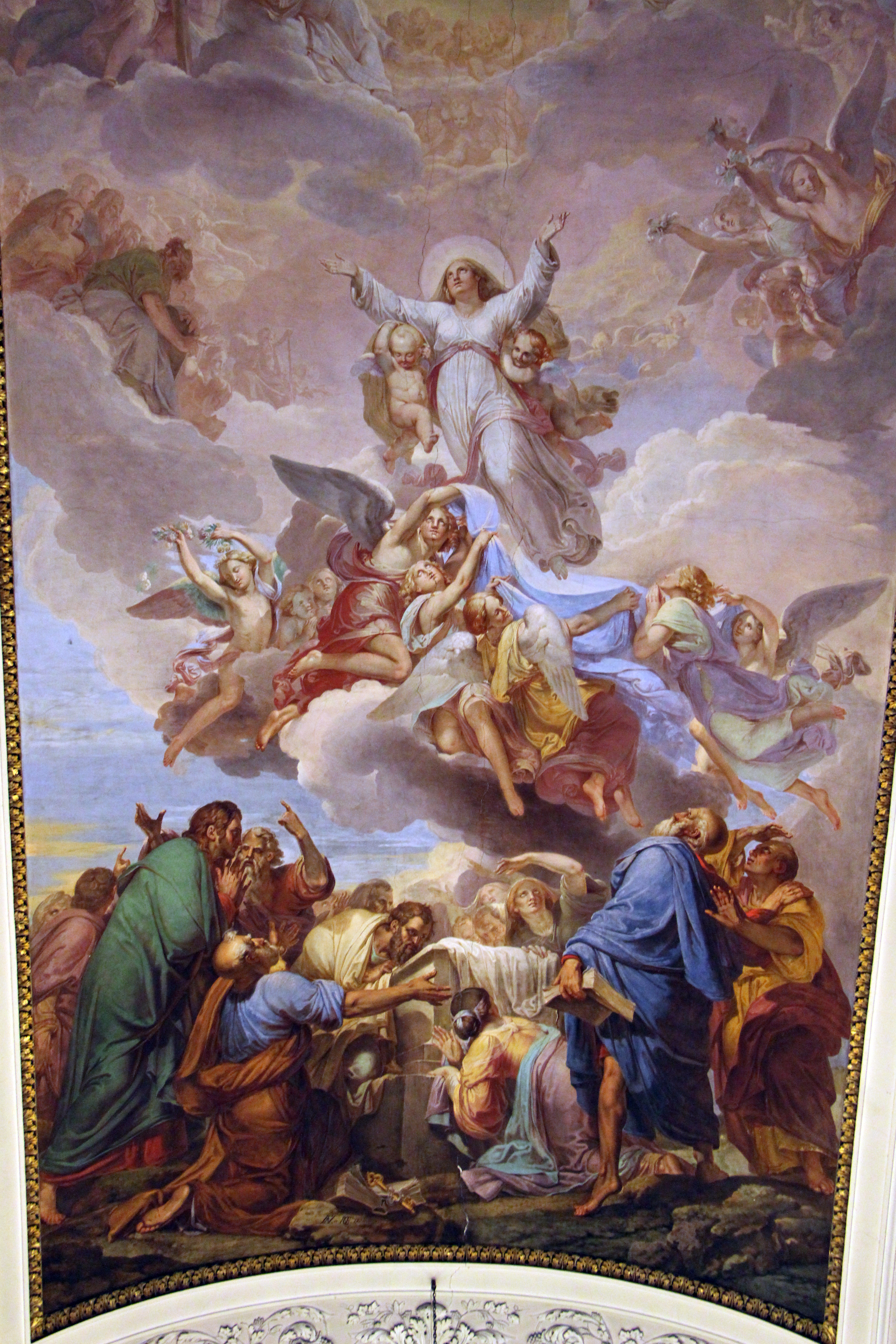
Assumption of the Virgin (1823), Florence

Francesco Nenci (April 10, 1781 in Anghiari – March 4, 1850 in Siena) was an Italian painter, mainly of historic and sacred subjects in a Neoclassical style.

== Biography ==
While his first education was in Città di Castello, he then enrolled at the Academy of Fine Arts of Florence, where he studied under Pietro Benvenuti. He then briefly moved to Brera Academy, where he won prizes in 1805 and 1809 with respectively Sappho and Alcaeus in Elysium and the oil canvas of Zenobia found by the Arasse River (after being stabbed by Rhadamistus) In 1806, he won a prize at the Academy of Florence for Achille swears revenge for the death of Patroclus

He obtained a stipend from the Napoleonic administration to study in Rome, where he painted Ajace Telamonio che vuol salvarsi dalla tempesta (1814); Il pastore che toglie il fanciullo Edipo dall’ albero ove era stato appeso(1815); and Virgin in prayer with putti (1816).

Back in Florence, he painted an Assumption of the Virgin in the Chapel of the Villa Poggio Imperiale. Among other works, he was commissioned a canvas of the Martyrdom of Saint Irene for church of San Paolo Maggiore, Naples. He painted frescoes from the stories of Homer in Villa Bianchi outside of Siena. Finally in 1833 he painted large canvases for the Hall of Ulysses in the Palazzo Pitti.

Nenci was also involved in engravings for books. He illustrated in engraving a mezzo macchia the edition of Dante by Ancora (Florence, 1817). He also engraved illustrations for an edition of the Iliad published by Batelli in Florence in 1838.

He taught at the Academy of Siena and became director in 1827, when Giuseppe Collignon resigned.
