= Autumn =

One of Earth's four temperate seasons

Autumn (Fall)
Temperate season
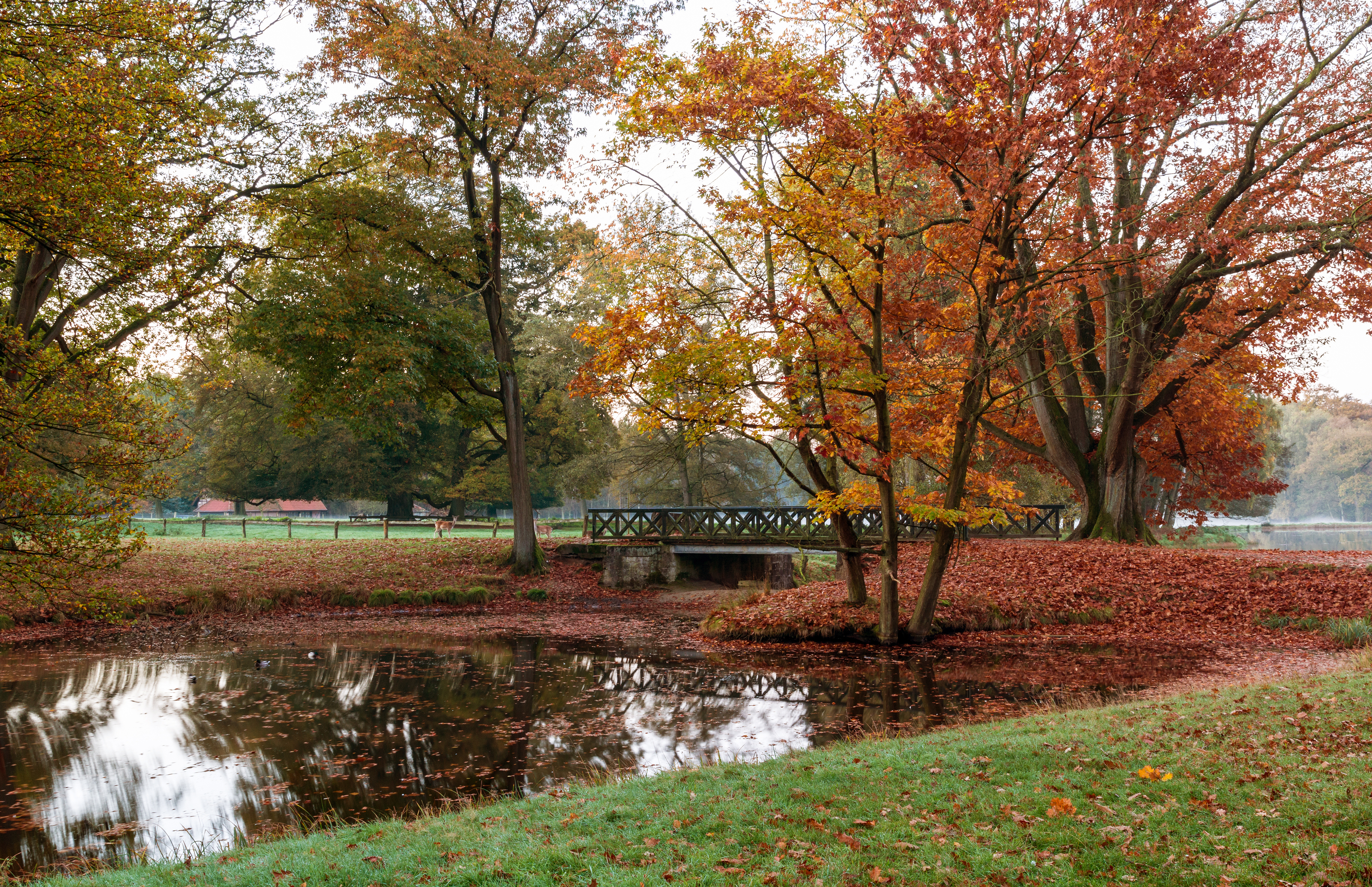
- Leaves often turn orange and fall from trees in autumn.

Northern temperate zone
- Astronomical season: 22 September – 21 December
- Meteorological season: 1 September – 30 November
- Solar (Celtic) season: 1 August – 31 October

Southern temperate zone
- Astronomical season: 20 March – 21 June
- Meteorological season: 1 March – 31 May
- Solar (Celtic) season: 1 February – 30 April
- Summer; Spring Autumn; Winter

Autumn, also known as fall in North American English, is one of the four temperate seasons on Earth. Outside the tropics, autumn marks the transition from summer to winter, beginning in September (Northern Hemisphere) or March (Southern Hemisphere). Autumn is the season when the duration of daytime becomes noticeably shorter and the temperature cools considerably. Day length decreases and night length increases as the season progresses until the winter solstice in December (Northern Hemisphere) and June (Southern Hemisphere). One of its main features in temperate climates is the striking change in colour of the leaves of deciduous trees as they prepare to shed.

== Date definitions ==
Some cultures regard the autumnal equinox as "mid-autumn", while others with a longer temperature lag treat the equinox as the start of autumn. In the English-speaking world of high latitude countries, autumn traditionally began with Lammas Day and ended around Halloween, the approximate mid-points between midsummer, the autumnal equinox, and midwinter. Meteorologists (and Australia and most of the temperate countries in the southern hemisphere) use a definition based on Gregorian calendar months, with autumn being September, October, and November in the Northern Hemisphere, and March, April, and May in the southern hemisphere.

In the higher latitude countries in the Northern Hemisphere, autumn traditionally starts with the September equinox (21 to 24 September) and ends with the winter solstice (21 or 22 December). In the United States, Labor Day (the first Monday in September) is often informally treated as the end of summer and start of autumn; certain summer traditions, such as wearing white, may be frowned upon after that date. As daytime and nighttime temperatures decrease, trees change colour and then shed their leaves.

Under the traditional East Asian solar term system, autumn starts on or around 8 August and ends on or about 7 November. In Ireland, the autumn months according to the national meteorological service Met Éireann are September, October, and November. However, according to the Irish Calendar, which is based on ancient Gaelic traditions, autumn lasts throughout the months of August, September, and October, or possibly a few days later, depending on tradition. In the Irish language, September is known as Meán Fómhair ('middle of autumn') and October as Deireadh Fómhair ('end of autumn'). Late Roman Republic scholar Marcus Terentius Varro defined autumn as lasting from the third day before the Ides of Sextilis (11 August) to the fifth day before the Ides of November (9 November).

== Etymology ==
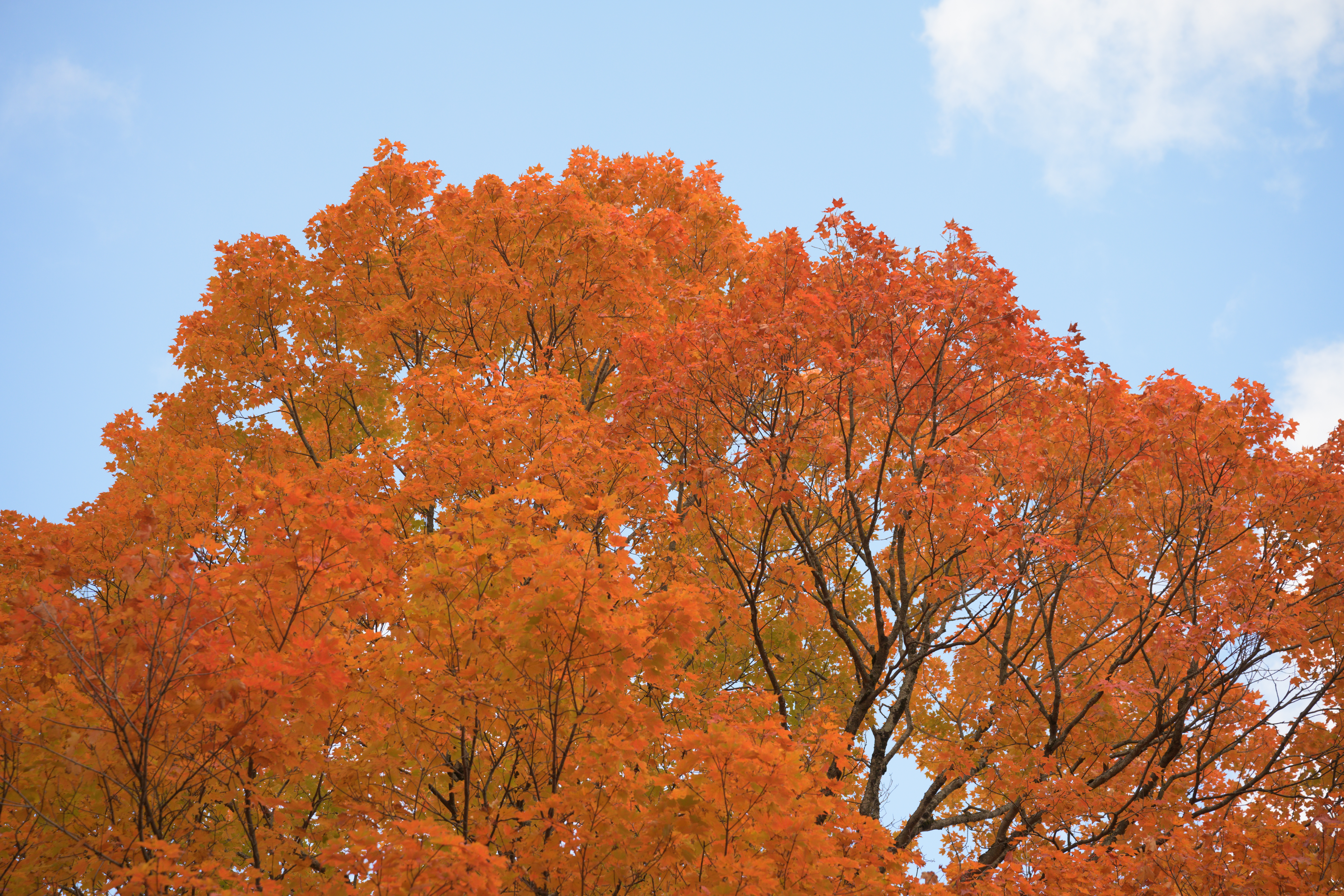
- Autumnal scene with yellow, orange, and red leaves
- Leaves falling from the trees during autumn in the forest Sound of leaves on trees and fallen on the ground

The word autumn (/ˈɔːtəm/) is derived from Latin autumnus, archaic auctumnus, possibly from the ancient Etruscan root autu-, which had connotations of the passing of the year. Alternative etymologies include Proto-Indo-European: *h₃ewǵ- ('cold') or *h₂sows- ('dry').

After the Greek era, the word continued to be used as the Old French word autompne (automne in modern French) or autumpne in Middle English, and was later normalised to the original Latin. In the Medieval period, there are rare examples of its use as early as the 12th century, but by the 16th century, it was in common use.

Before the 16th century, harvest was the term usually used to refer to the season, as it is common in other West Germanic languages to this day (cf. Dutch herfst, German Herbst, and Scots hairst). However, as more people gradually moved from working the land to living in towns, the word harvest lost its reference to the time of year and came to refer only to the actual activity of reaping, and autumn, as well as fall, began to replace it as a reference to the season.

The alternative word fall for the season traces its origins to old Germanic languages. The exact derivation is unclear, with the Old English fiæll or feallan and the Old Norse fall all being possible candidates. However, these words all have the meaning 'to fall from a height' and are clearly derived either from a common root or from each other. The term came to denote the season in 16th-century England, a contraction of Middle English expressions like "fall of the leaf" and "fall of the year". Compare the origin of spring from "spring of the leaf" and "spring of the year".

During the 17th century, English settlers began emigrating to the new North American colonies, and took the English language with them. While the term fall gradually became nearly obsolete in Britain, it became the more common term in North America.

The name backend, a once common name for the season in Northern England, has today been largely replaced by the name autumn.

== Associations ==
=== Harvest ===
Association with the transition from warm to cold weather, and its related status as the season of the primary harvest, has dominated its themes and popular images. Many cultures feature autumnal harvest festivals, often the most important on their calendars.

Still-extant echoes of these celebrations are found in the autumn Thanksgiving holiday of the United States and Canada, and the Jewish Sukkot holiday with its roots as a full-moon harvest festival of "tabernacles" (living in outdoor huts around the time of harvest). There are also the many festivals celebrated by Indigenous peoples of the Americas tied to the harvest of ripe foods gathered in the wild, the Chinese Mid-Autumn Festival, also known as the Moon Festival, and many others. The predominant mood of these autumnal celebrations is a gladness for the fruits of the earth mixed with a certain melancholy linked to the imminent arrival of harsh weather.

This view is presented in English poet John Keats's poem To Autumn, where he describes the season as a time of bounteous fecundity, a time of "mellow fruitfulness".

In North America, while most foods are harvested during the autumn, foods usually associated with the season include pumpkins (which are integral parts of both Thanksgiving and Halloween) and apples, which are used to make the seasonal beverage apple cider.

=== Melancholia ===
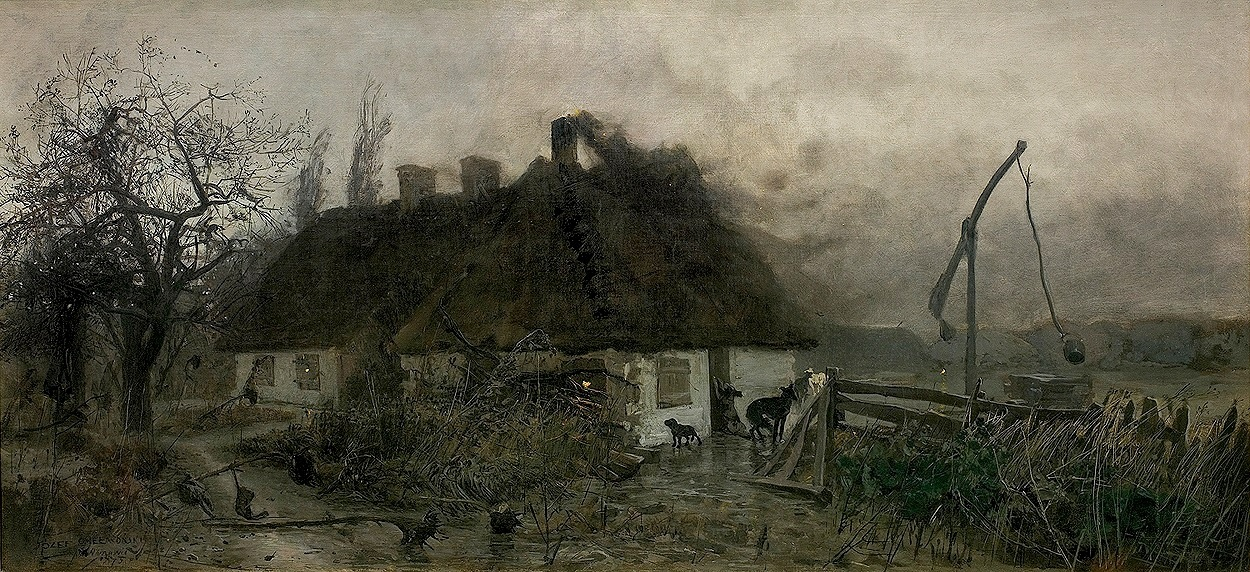
Jesień ('Autumn') – An oil painting by Józef Chełmoński (1875) presenting a typical view of autumn in the 19th-century Polish countryside

Autumn, especially in poetry, has often been associated with melancholia. The possibilities and opportunities of summer are gone, and the chill of winter is on the horizon. Skies turn grey, the amount of usable daylight drops rapidly, and many people turn inward, both physically and mentally. It has been referred to as an unhealthy season.

Similar examples may be found in Irish poet W. B. Yeats's poem "The Wild Swans at Coole"where the maturing season that the poet observes symbolically represents his own ageing self. Like the natural world that he observes, he too has reached his prime and now must look forward to the inevitability of old age and death. French poet Paul Verlaine's "Chanson d'automne" ('Autumn Song') is likewise characterised by strong, painful feelings of sorrow. Keats's To Autumn, written in September 1819, echoes this sense of melancholic reflection but also emphasises the lush abundance of the season. The song "Autumn Leaves", based on the French song "Les Feuilles mortes" (lit. 'Dead Leaves'), uses the melancholic atmosphere of the season and the end of summer as a metaphor for the mood of being separated from a loved one.

=== Halloween ===
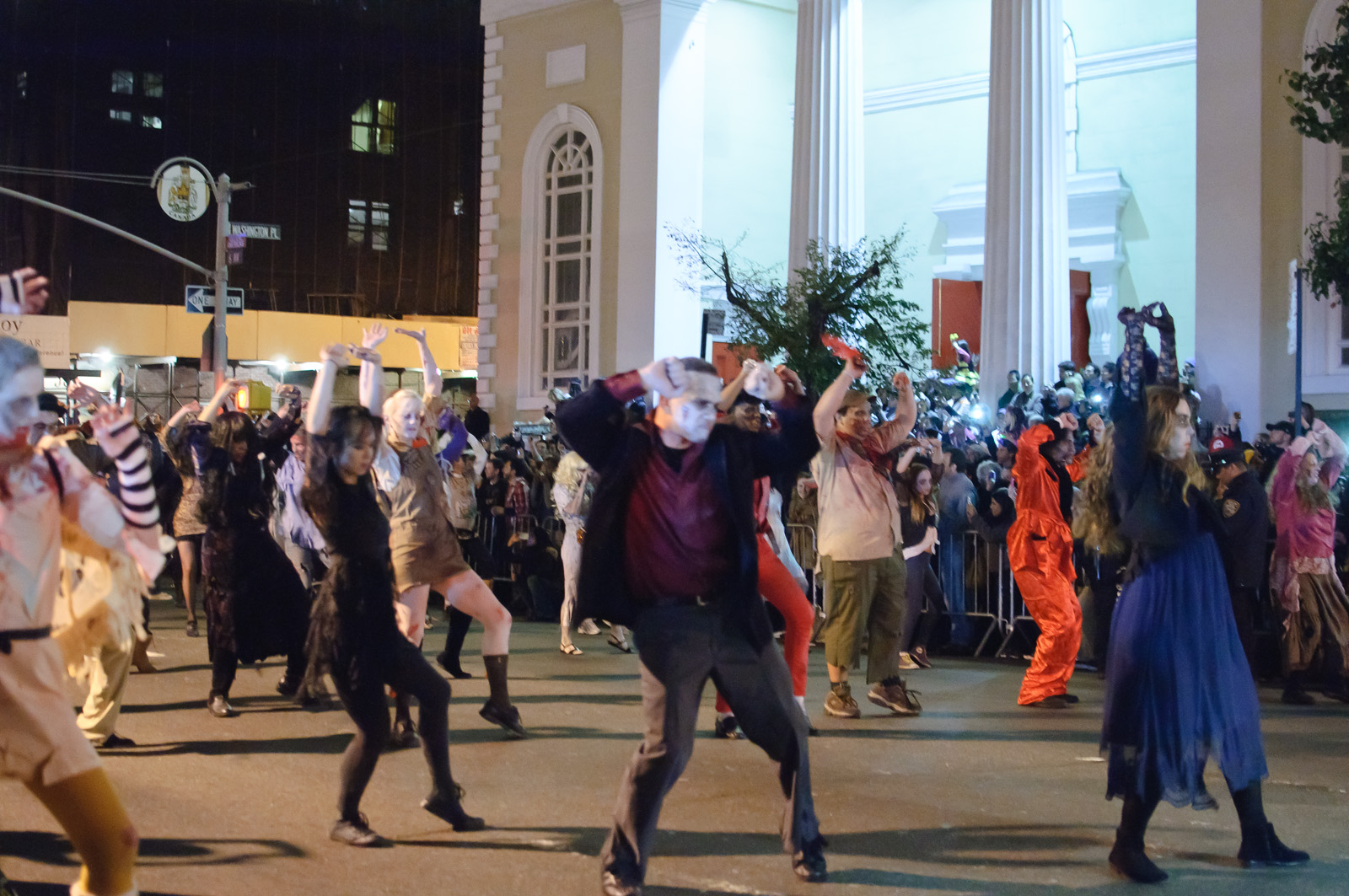
The annual Greenwich Village Halloween Parade in Lower Manhattan is the world's largest Halloween parade, with millions of spectators annually, and has its roots in New York City's queer community.

In the northern hemisphere autumn is associated with Halloween (influenced by Samhain, a Celtic autumn festival), and with it a widespread marketing campaign that promotes it. The Celtic people also used this time to celebrate the harvest with a time of feasting. At the same time though, it was a celebration of death as well. Crops were harvested, livestock were butchered, and winter was coming.

Halloween, 31 October, is in autumn in the northern hemisphere. Television, film, book, costume, home decoration, and confectionery businesses use this time of year to promote products closely associated with such a holiday, with promotions going from late August or early September to 31 October, since their themes rapidly lose strength once the holiday ends, and advertising starts concentrating on Christmas.

In the southern hemisphere Halloween takes place in Spring.

=== Other associations ===
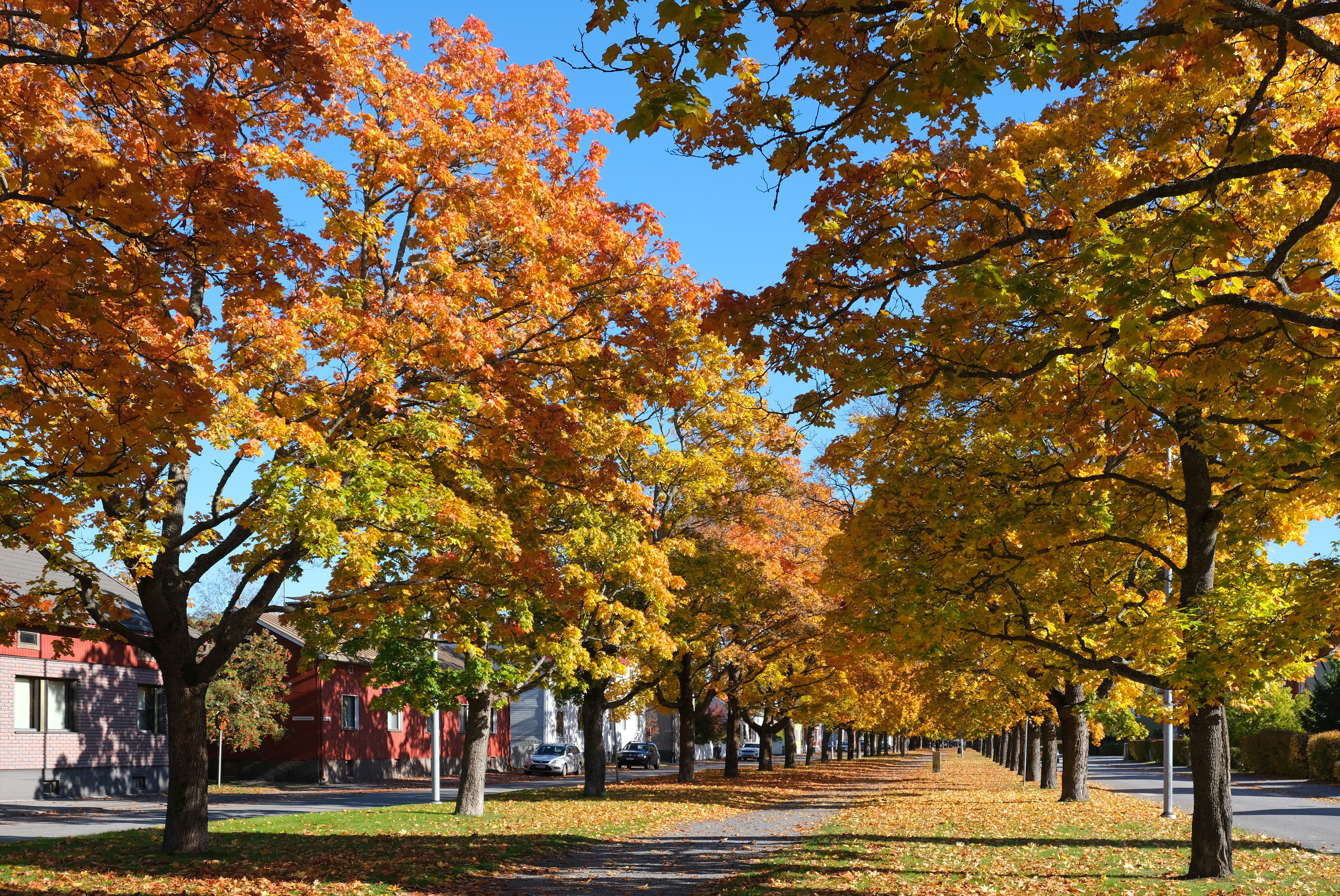
Autumn colouration at the Kalevanpuisto park in Pori, Finland.

In some parts of the northern hemisphere, autumn has a strong association with the end of summer holiday and the start of a new school year, particularly for children in primary and secondary education. "Back to School" advertising and preparations usually occur in the weeks leading to the beginning of autumn.

Thanksgiving Day is a national holiday celebrated in Canada, in the United States, in some of the Caribbean islands, and in Liberia. Thanksgiving is celebrated on the second Monday of October in Canada, on the fourth Thursday of November in the United States (where it is commonly regarded as the start of the Christmas and holiday season), and around the same part of the year in other places. Similarly named festival holidays occur in Germany and Japan.

Television stations and networks, particularly in North America, traditionally begin their regular seasons in their autumn, with new series and new episodes of existing series debuting mostly during late September or early October (series that debut outside the autumn season are usually known as mid-season replacements). A sweeps period takes place in November to measure Nielsen Ratings.

American football is played almost exclusively in the autumn months; at the high school level, seasons run from late August through early November, with some playoff games and holiday rivalry contests being played as late as Thanksgiving. In many American states, the championship games take place in early December. College football's regular season runs from September through November, while the main professional circuit, the National Football League, plays from September through to early January.

Summer sports, such as association football (in Northern America, East Asia and South Africa), Canadian football, stock car racing, tennis, golf, cricket, and professional baseball, wrap up their seasons in early to late autumn; Major League Baseball's championship World Series is popularly known as the "Fall Classic". (Amateur baseball is usually finished by August.) Likewise, professional winter sports, such as ice hockey and basketball, and most leagues of association football in Europe, are in the early stages of their seasons during autumn; American college basketball and college ice hockey play teams outside their athletic conferences during the late autumn before their in-conference schedules begin in winter.

The Christian religious holidays of All Saints' Day and All Souls' Day are observed in autumn in the Northern hemisphere. Easter falls in autumn in the southern hemisphere.

The secular celebration of International Workers' Day also falls in autumn in the southern hemisphere.

Since 1997, Autumn has been one of the top 100 names for girls in the United States.

Iranians celebrate the beginning of the autumn during the festival of Mehregan (Persian: مهرگان). Indians celebrate the beginning of autumn during the festivals of Vijayadashami and Diwali.

In Indian mythology, autumn is considered to be the preferred season for the goddess of learning, Saraswati, who is also known by the name of "goddess of autumn" (Sharada).

In Asian mysticism, autumn is associated with the element of metal, and subsequently with the colour white, the White Tiger of the West, and death and mourning.

== Tourism ==
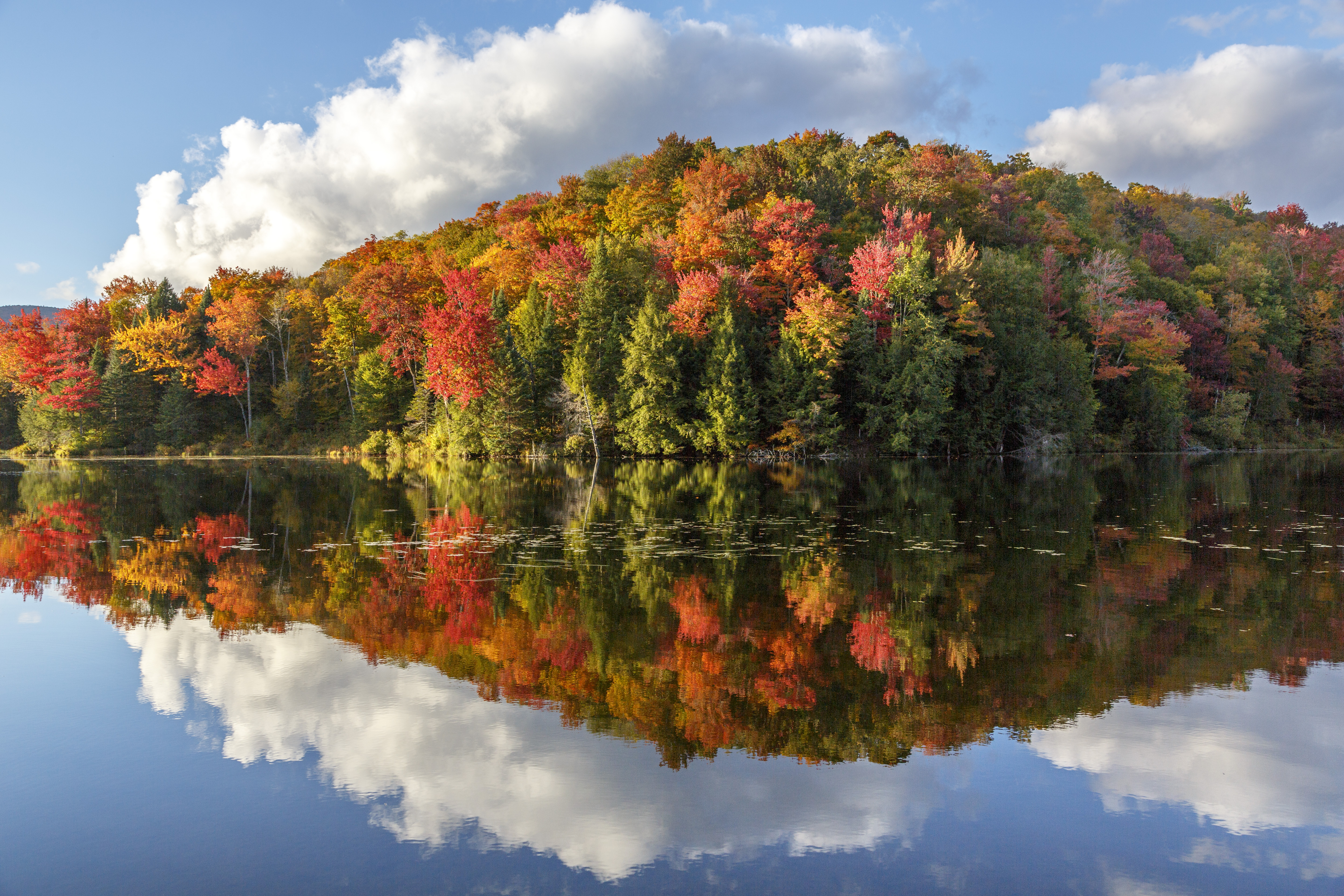
Reflection of autumnal colours on Eden Lake, Vermont, US

Although colour change in leaves occurs wherever deciduous trees are found, coloured autumn foliage is noted in various regions of the world: most of North America, Eastern Asia (including China, Korea, and Japan), Europe, southeast, south, and part of the midwest of Brazil, the forest of Patagonia, eastern Australia and New Zealand's South Island.

Eastern Canada and New England are famous for their autumnal foliage, and this attracts major tourism (worth billions of US dollars) for the regions.

== Views of autumn ==
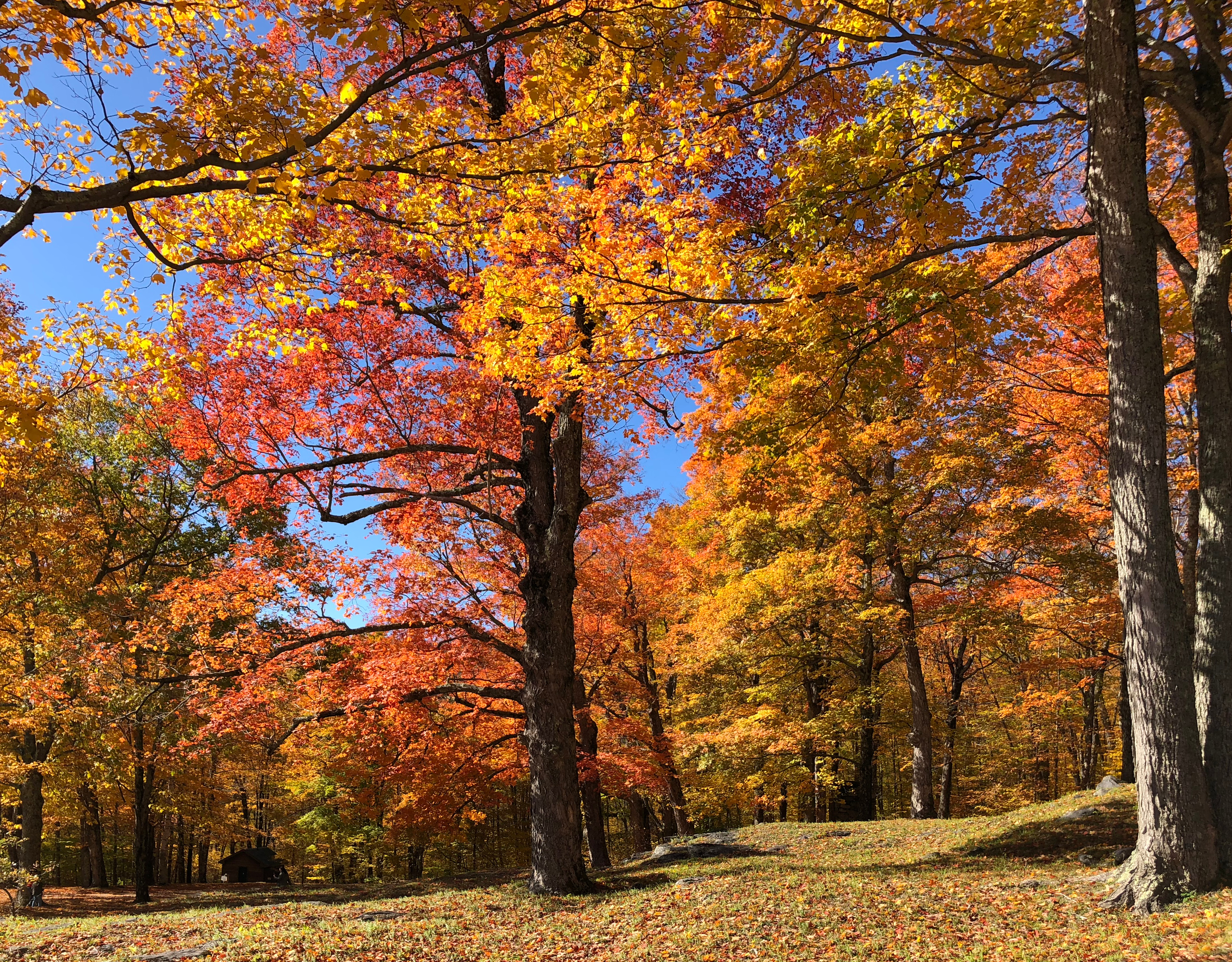
Autumn foliage in Vermont, US

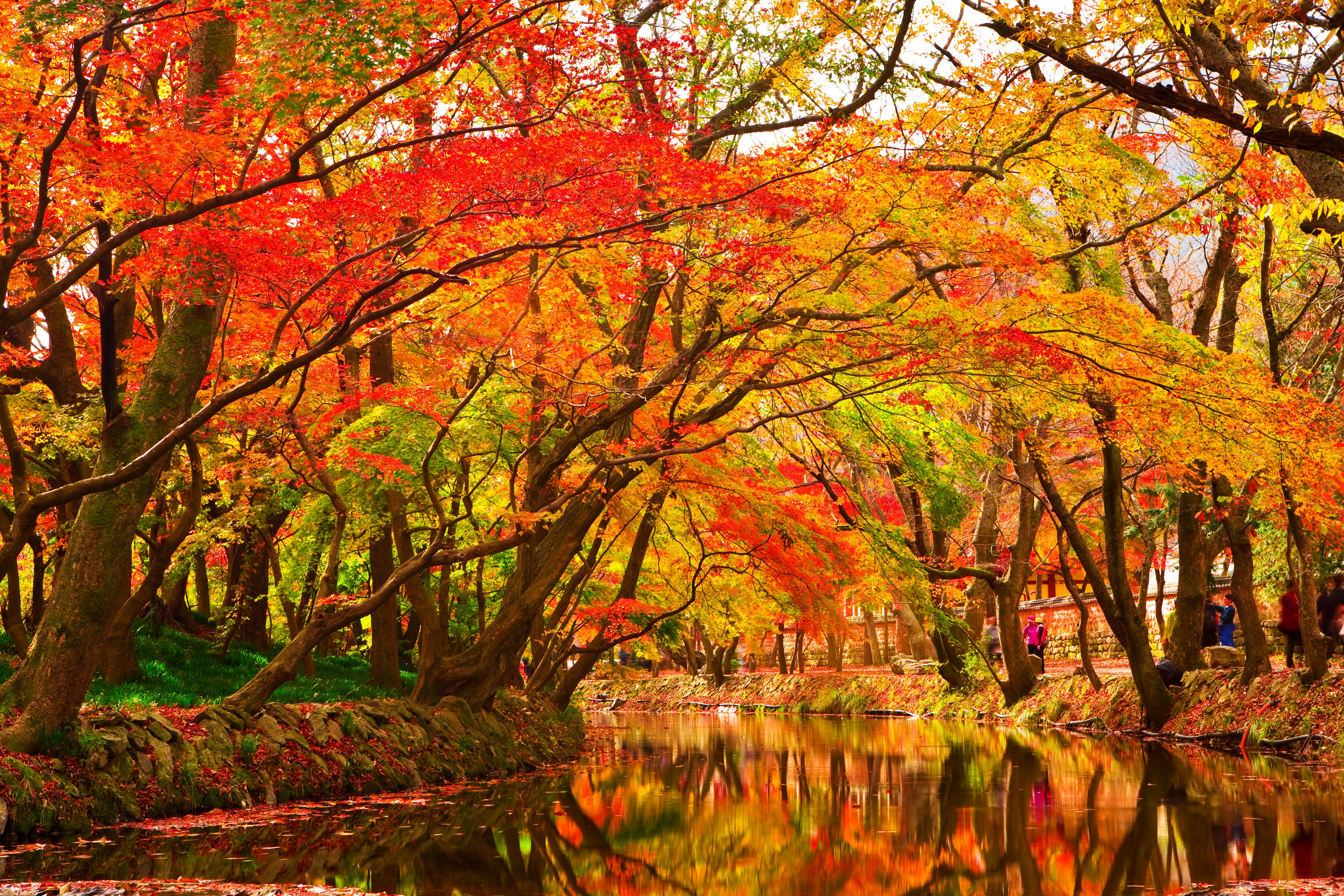
Maple leaves changing colour by a creek

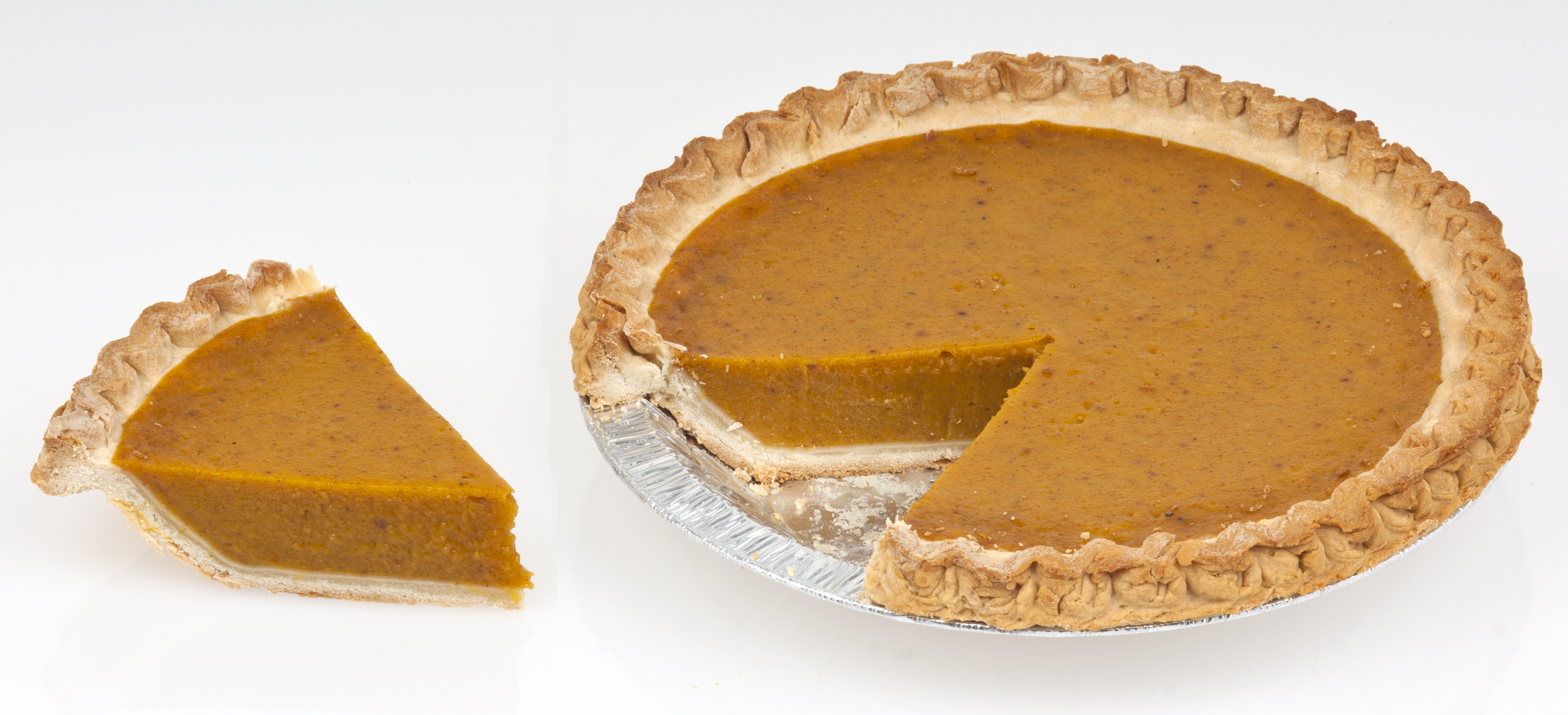
Pumpkin pie is commonly served on and around Thanksgiving in North America

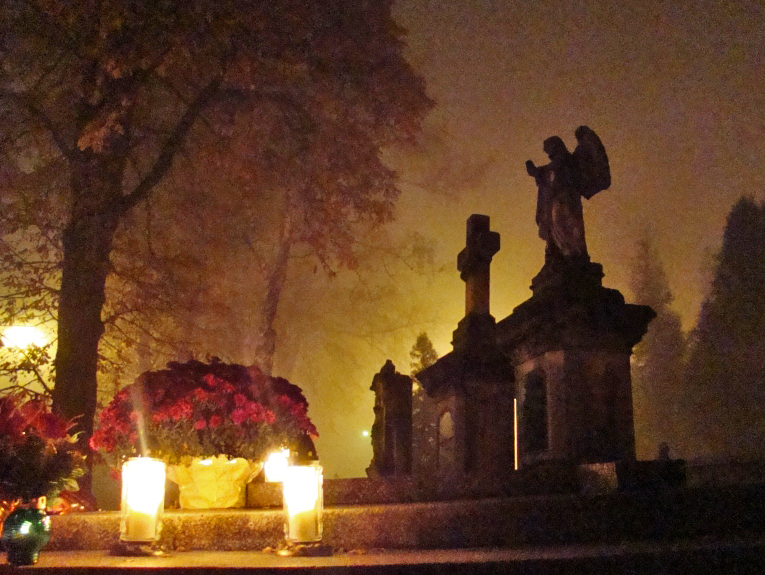
All Saints' Day at a cemetery in Sanok, Poland—flowers and lit candles are placed to honour the memory of deceased relatives.

Falling autumn leaves in Kanagawa, Japan

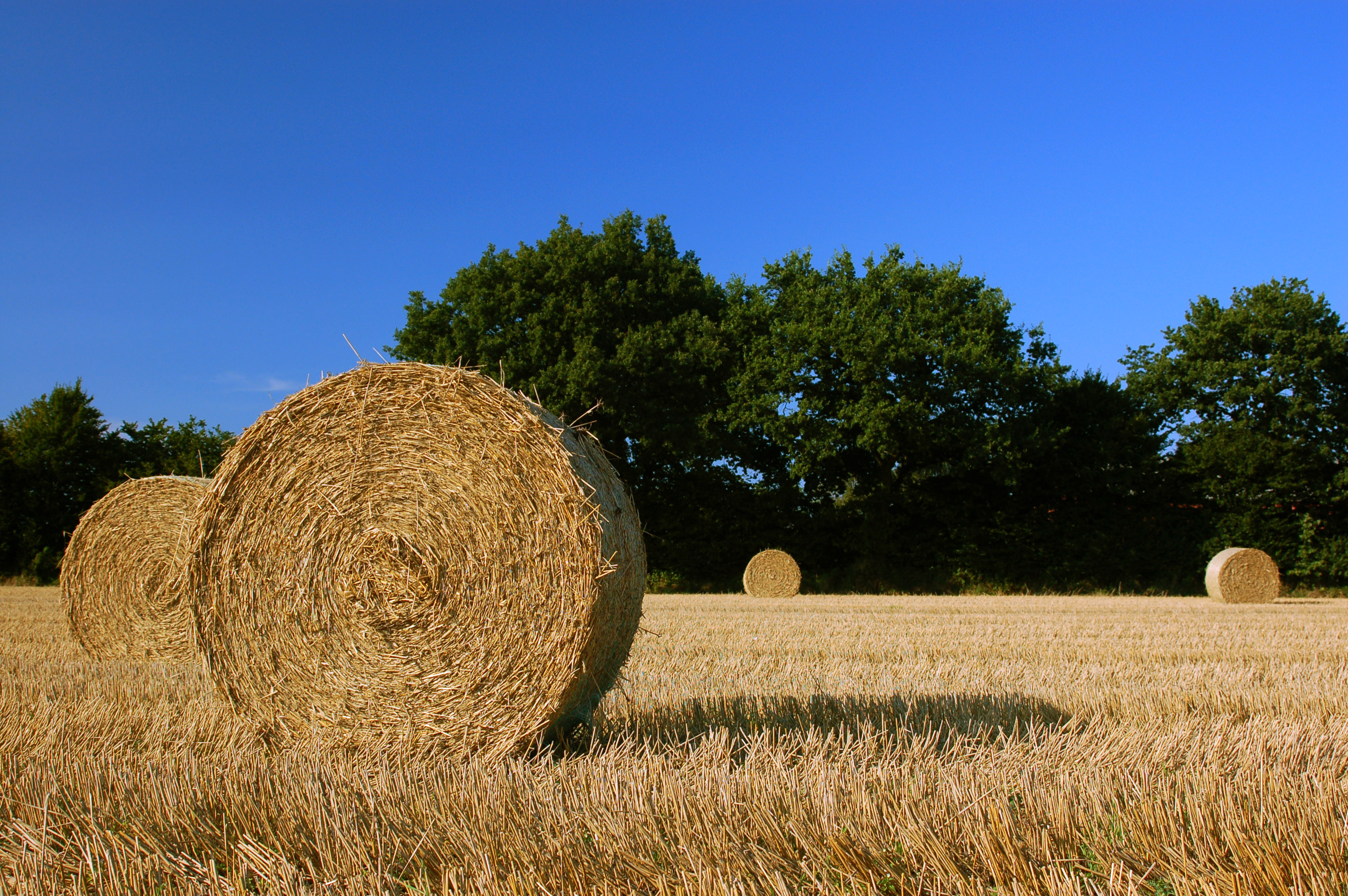
Harvest straw bales in a field of Schleswig-Holstein, Germany

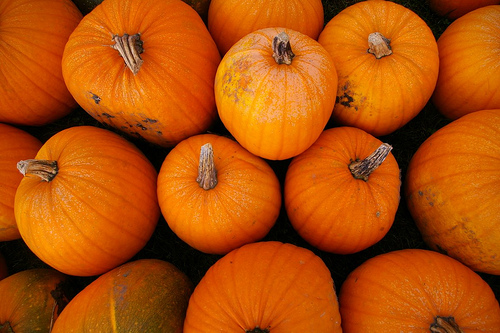
Halloween pumpkins

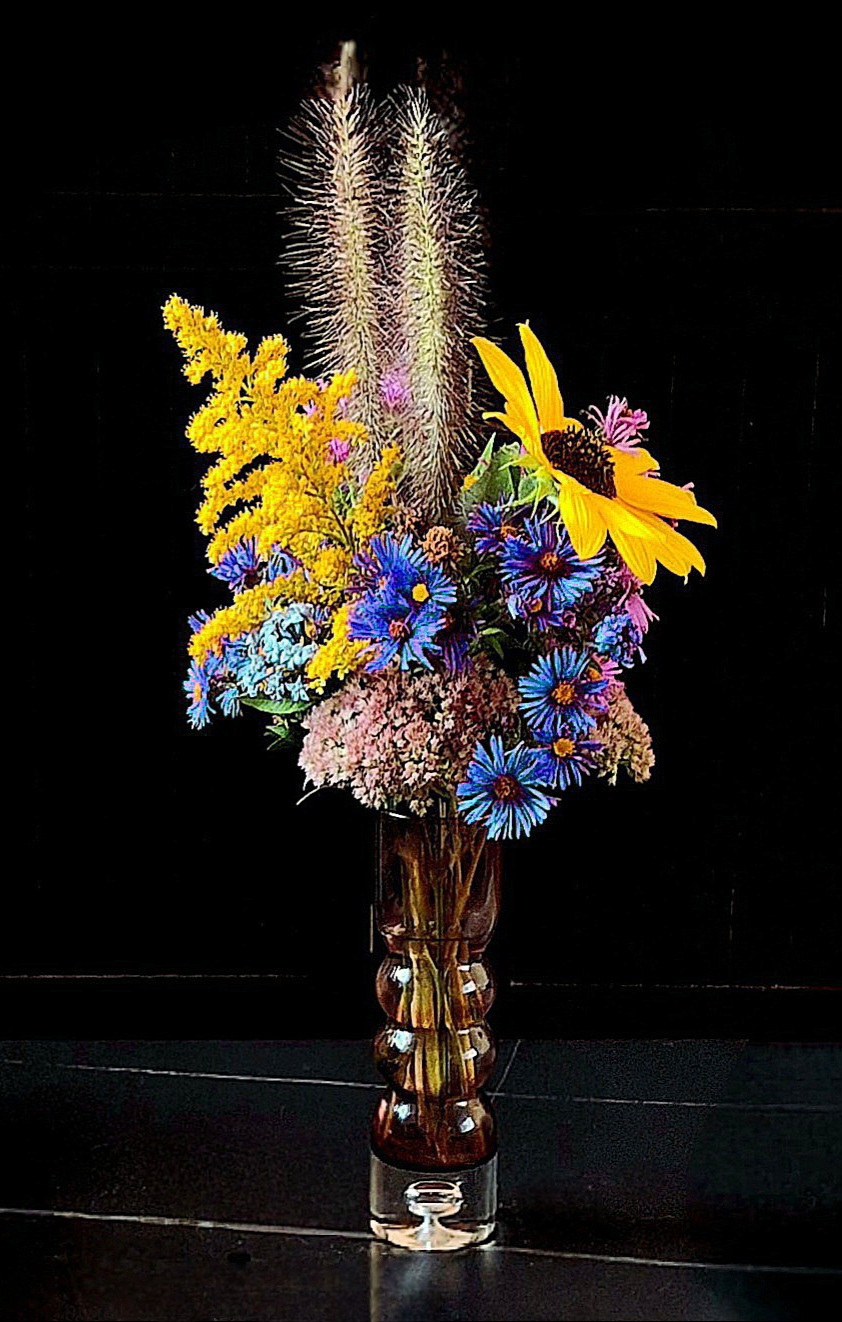
Autumn bouquet, New York, US

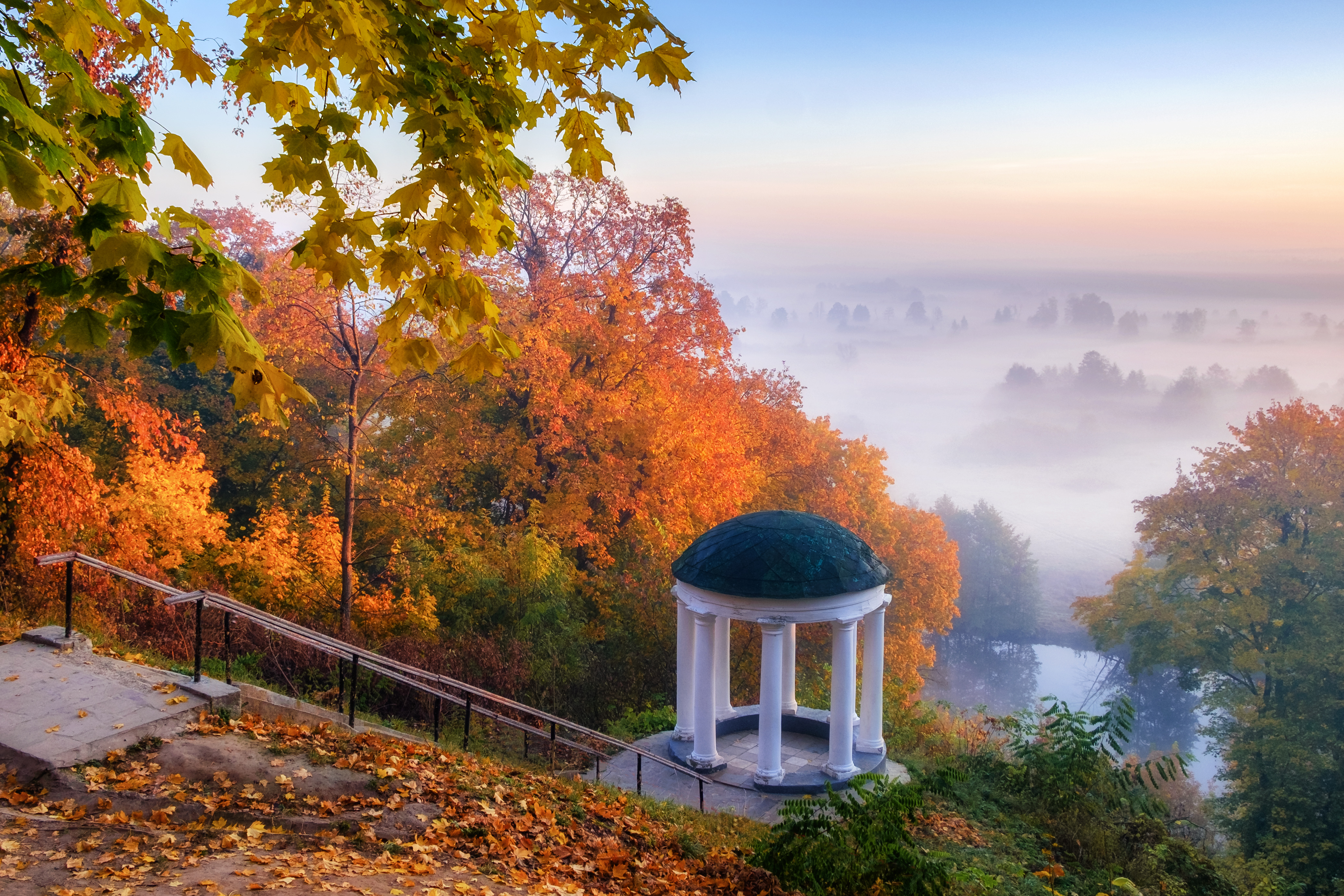
Autumn in Sedniv, Ukraine

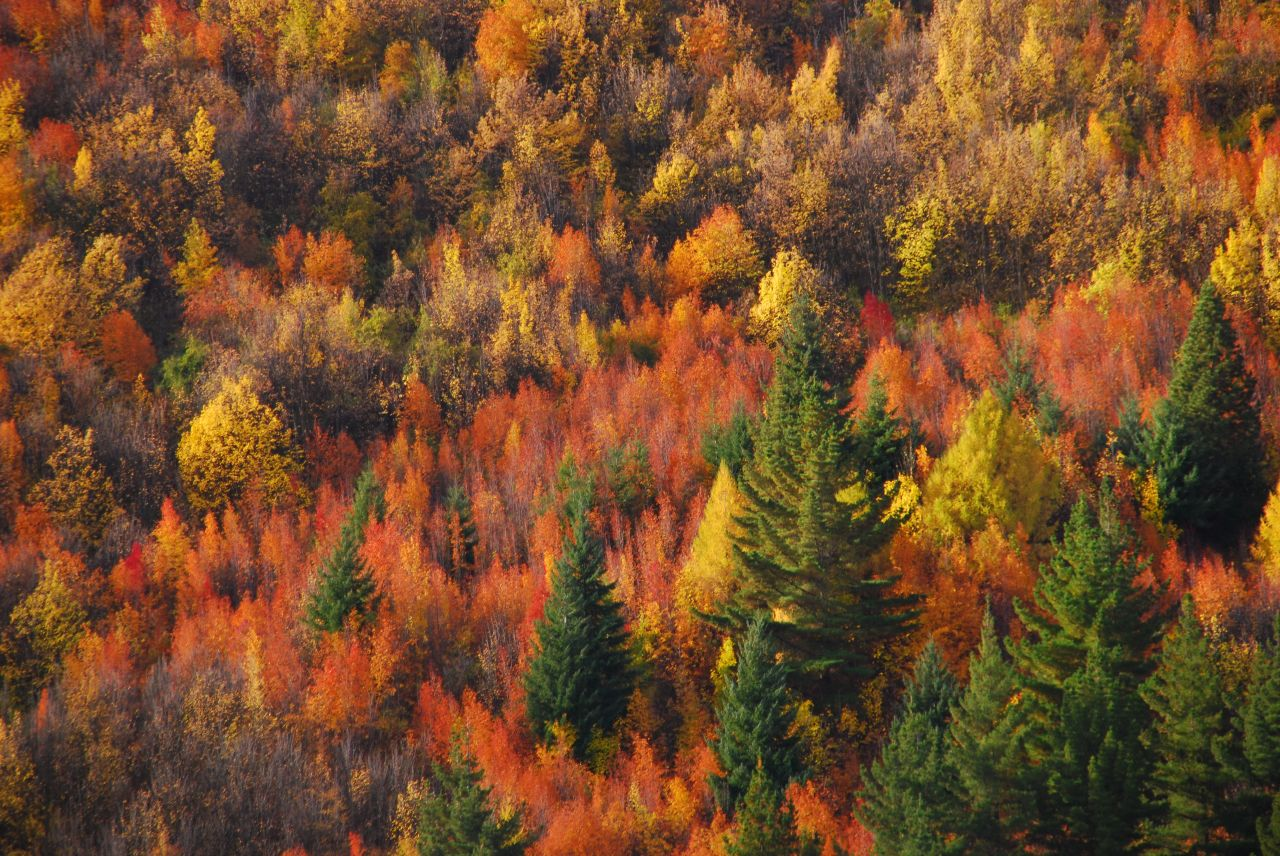
Autumn colours in Arrowtown, New Zealand

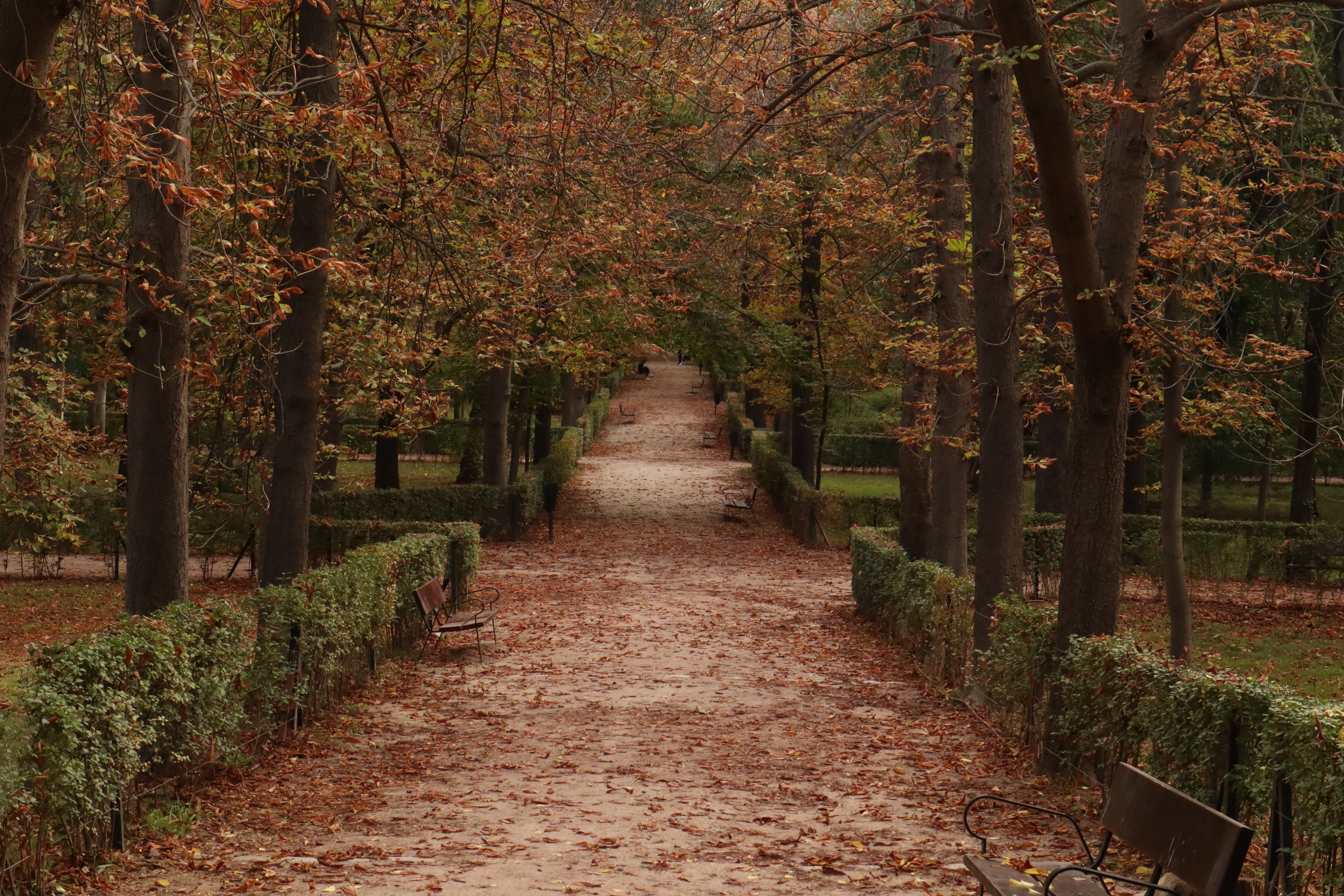
Autumn seen in a park in Madrid, Spain

== Allegories of autumn in art ==
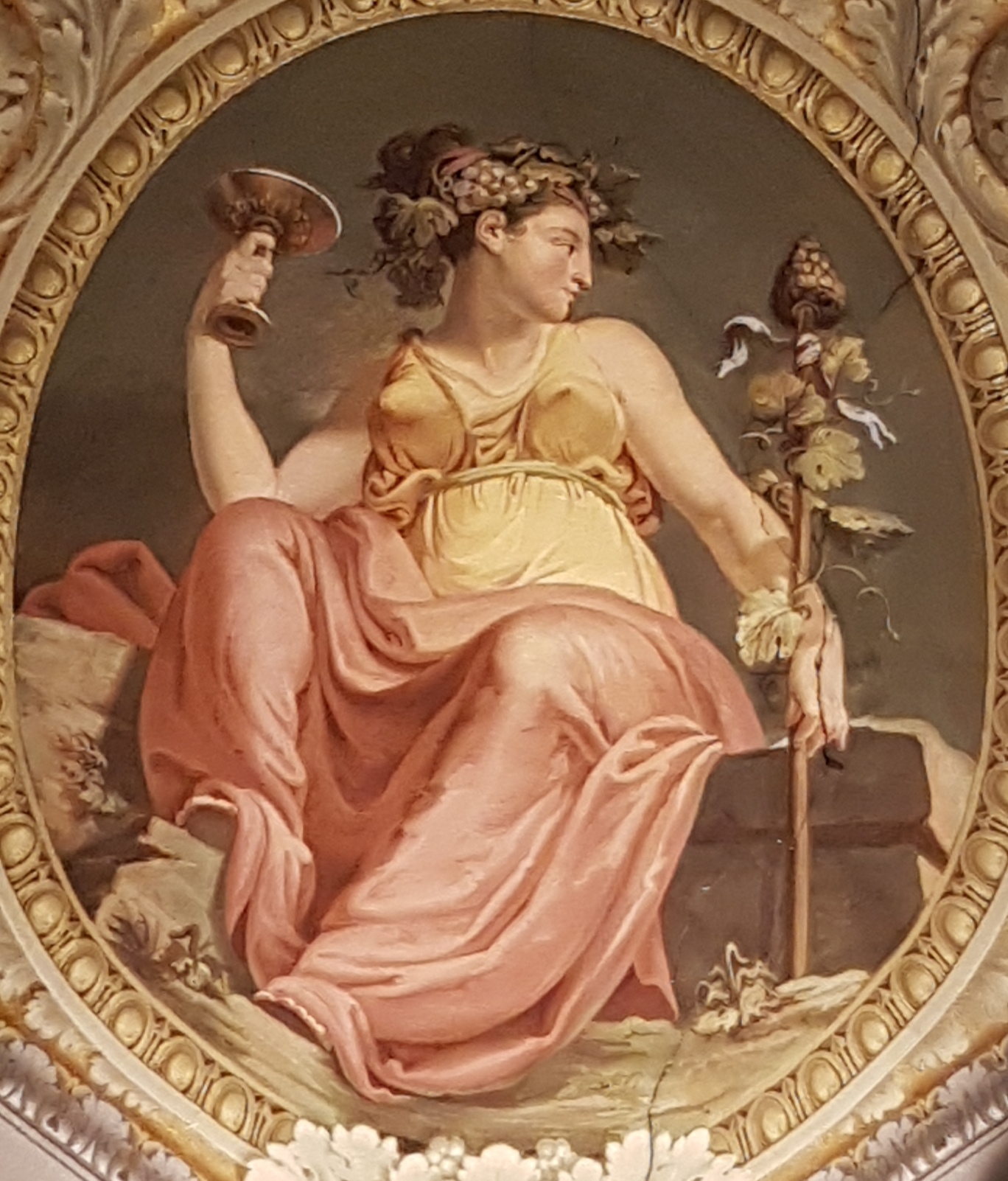
Autumn, by Giuseppe Collignon

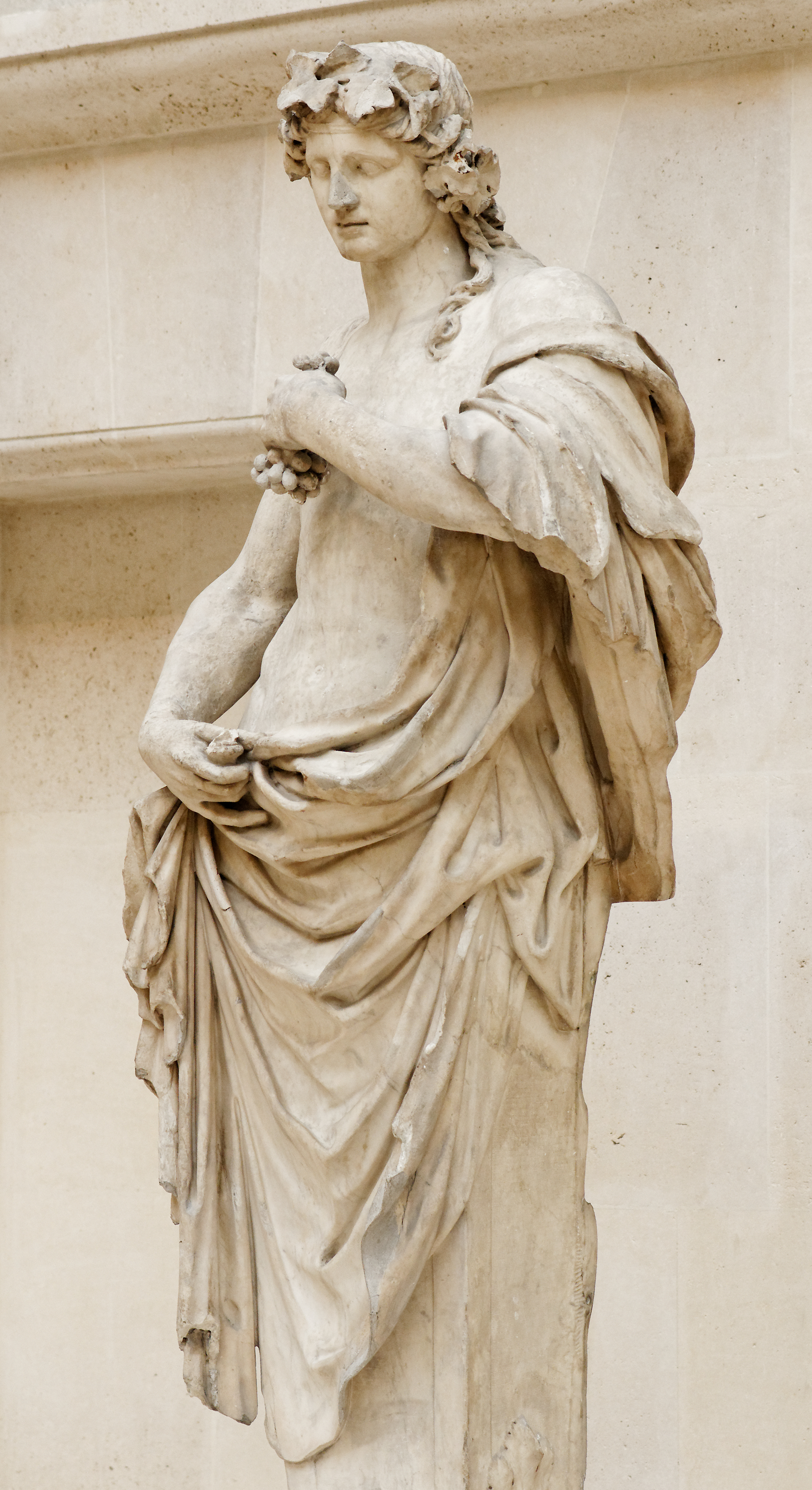
Autumn, by Pierre Le Gros the Elder

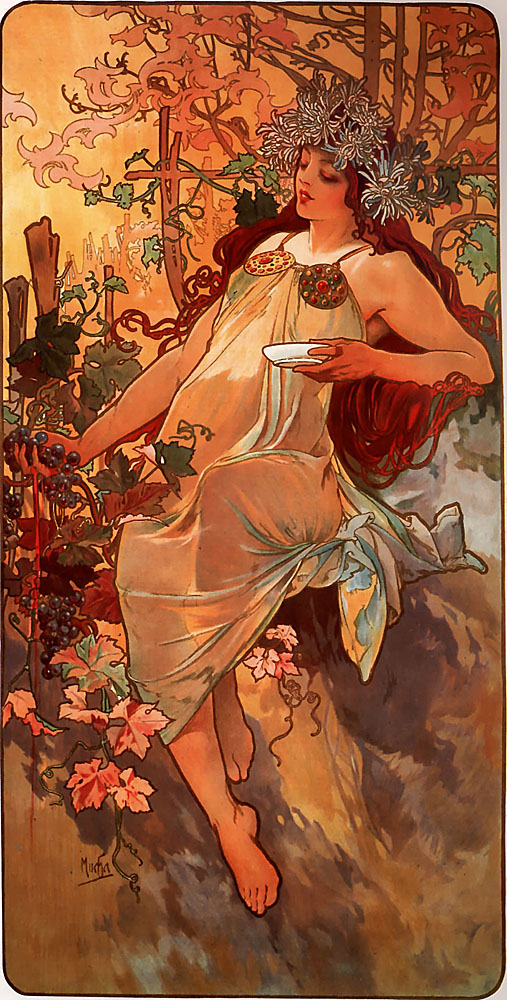
Autumn (1896), by Art Nouveau artist Alphonse Mucha

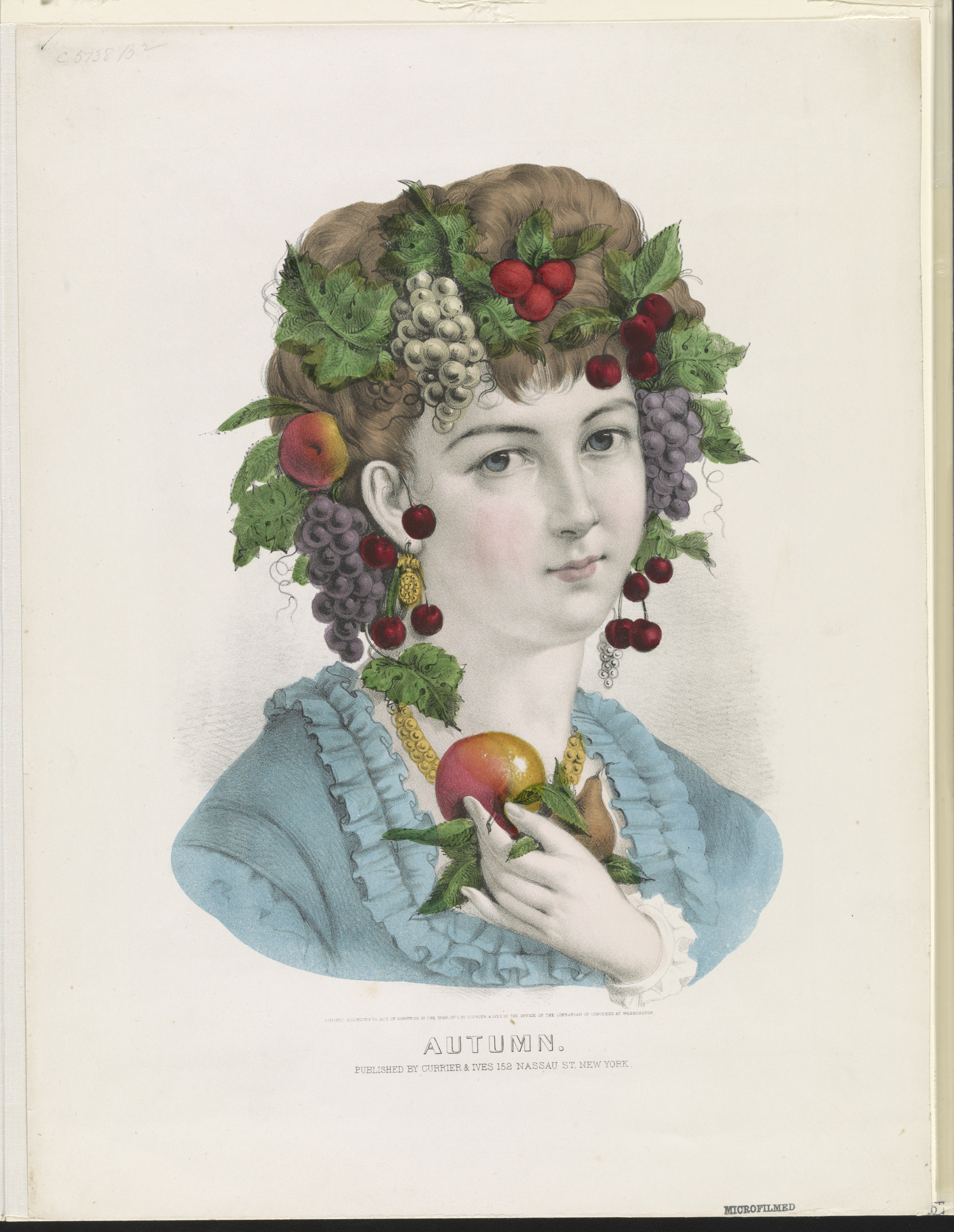
Autumn (1871), by Currier & Ives

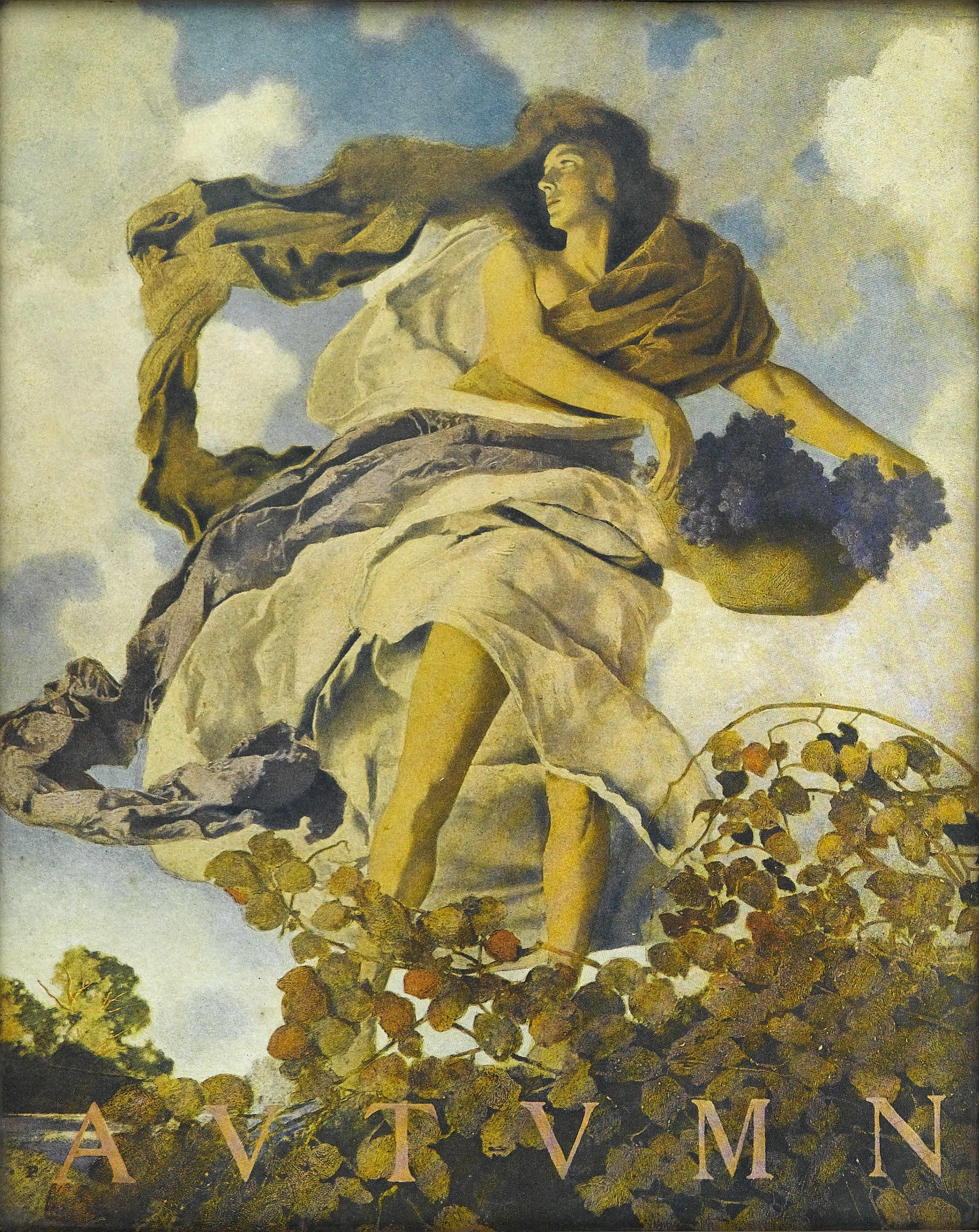
This 1905 print by Maxfield Frederick Parrish illustrated John Keats' poem To Autumn

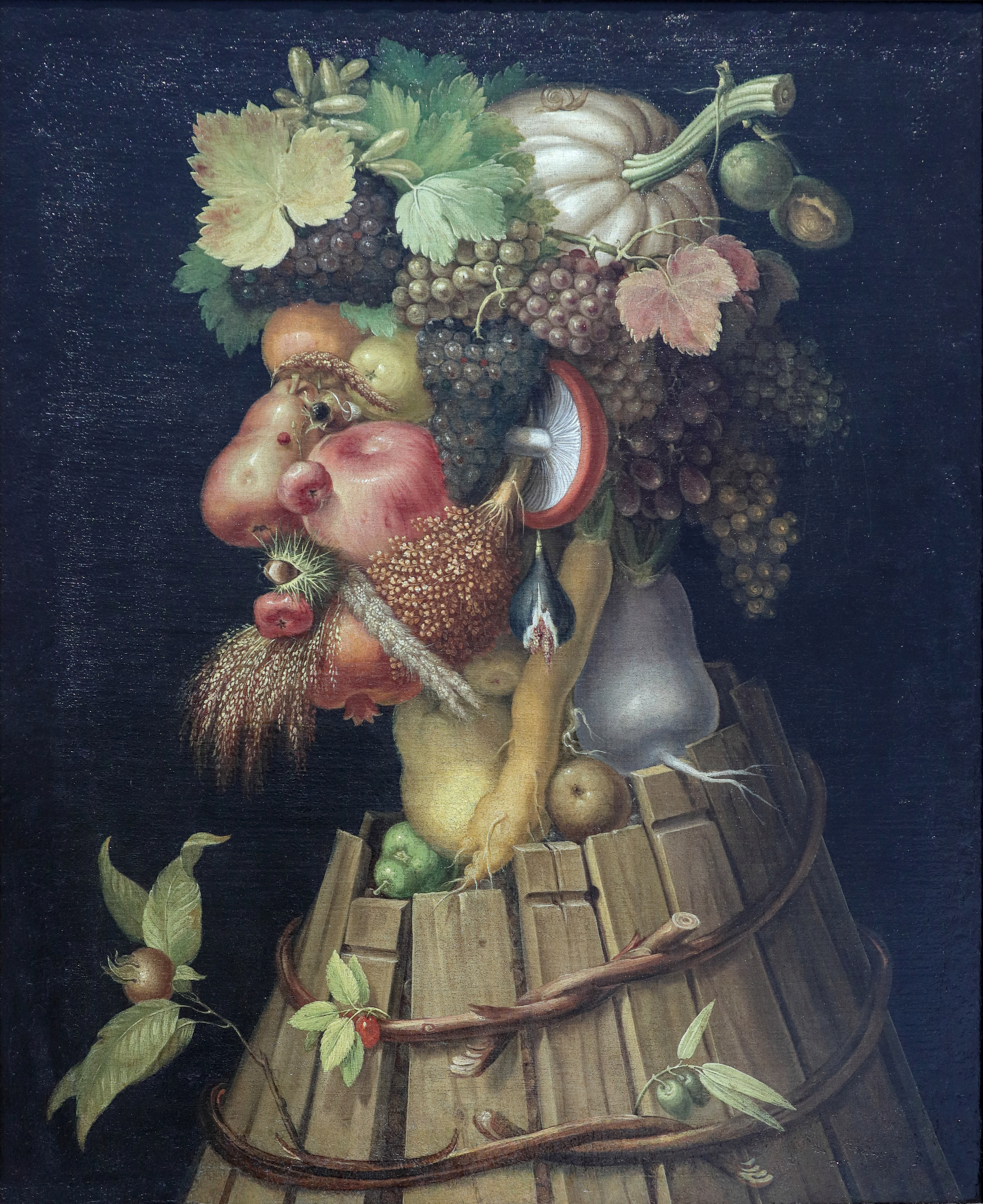
Autumn (1573), by Giuseppe Arcimboldo

== See also ==
- Autumn in New England
