= Autumn Adeigbo =

American designer

- Born: Poughkeepsie, New York
- Citizenship: United States
- Education: Spelman College; Parsons School of Design
- Occupation: Fashion designer
- Awards: Neiman Marcus Fashion Award (2022)
- Website: https://autumnadeigbo.com

Autumn Adeigbo is an American designer of Nigerian heritage. She is the founder of the eponymous women's ready-to-wear and accessories brand. Adeigbo's company became the first brand led by a female, black designer to raise more than $1 million in venture capital funding.

== Biography ==
Autumn Adeigbo was born in Poughkeepsie, New York to Nigerian parents. Her mother is of the Ibo tribe and her father is of the Yoruba tribe. Adeigbo grew up in Illinois and Indiana, where her mother moved to attend medical school. Adeigbo's father is an artist and writer. According to Adeigbo, she got her interest in fashion from her mother, who sewed her clothes when Adeigbo was a young girl.

Autumn Adeigbo graduated from Spelman College with a degree in economics, as well as from Parsons School of Design with a degree in Fashion Design in 2005. She interned with Betsy Johnson, worked in retail at Anna Sui and Paul Smith, and assisted celebrity fashion stylists Andrea Lieberman, Leslie Fremar, and Rebecca Weinberg.

Adeigbo started developing her own collection in 2009. The designer's first collection consisted of seven African inspired dresses. At the time, she was working as a fashion assistant at W magazine and hostessing at New York City hotspots The Lion and STK restaurants.

In 2014, Adeigbo launched a program in Ghana for women, teaching them hand beading for fair-trade wages. She went on to launch three additional fair-trade pilot programs in Nigeria, Kenya, and Rwanda.

In 2016, Autumn Adeigbo created the namesake brand.

In 2017, she started working with angel investor Christopher Elliott, who invested in her first official collection, which was presented in 2019.

In 2019, Autumn Adeigbo was named a Tory Burch fellow at the Tory Burch Foundation. She became one of 12 finalists who competed in the Fashion Institute of Technology's Design Entrepreneur program.

In 2020, Adeigbo raised $1.3 million in venture capital funding for the development of a brand. The brand Autumn Adeigbo became the first brand led by a female, black designer to raise more than $1 million in venture capital funding.

In September 2021, she raised additional funds in the amount of nearly $3 million, led by venture capital firm Offline Ventures. Cameron Diaz, Gabrielle Union, and Mila Kunis also participated in the round in addition to the Global Impact Fund.

In the same month, Autumn Adeigbo became a member of the Council of Fashion Designers of America (CFDA) when she was invited by chair Tom Ford.

In 2021, she raised a second round of funding bringing the total to $4.2mm in under two years led by Offline Ventures co-founders Dave Morin & Brit Morin and Chris Howard & Leah Solivan of Fuel Capital (Solivan is the founder of TaskRabbit).

Adeigbo launched her first First Holiday collection in 2022.

== Brand ==
The brand was originally inspired by the designer's Nigerian heritage. Autumn Adeigbo uses elements of modern, luxurious and vintage clothing in her collections. She aspires to invest in women along the design production and distribution chains. The designer collaborates with women. Adeigbo creates clothes in bright colors with prints and patterns.

Clients of the brand include Mila Kunis, Gabrielle Union, Kerry Washington, Charli D’Amelio, Mindy Kaling, Busy Philipps, Zooey Deschanel, Emily Blunt, Amanda Gorman, Kelly Clarkson, Florence Pugh, Jessica Alba, Sincerely Jules aka Julia Sarinana, Gwyneth Paltrow, Lizzo, Selma Blair, Zooey Deschanel, Kerry Washington, Katherine Schwarzenegger, Kristen Bell, Gabrielle Union, Blair Eadie.

Adeigbo received the Fashion Designer on the Rise award at the Neiman Marcus-sponsored National Black Arts Fine Art + Fashion Awards on April 7, 2022.
