= Autumn Lockwood =

American football coach

Autumn Lockwood (born in Chester, Pennsylvania) is an American football coach for the Philadelphia Eagles. In 2023, she became the first Black woman to coach in a Super Bowl and, in 2025, became the first Black woman to coach in a winning Super Bowl.

== Career ==
Lockwood was born in Chester, Pennsylvania and grew up in Morgantown, West Virginia. She graduated from University of Arizona, playing soccer, and East Tennessee State University. She was a strength and conditioning coach at University of Nevada, Las Vegas, and University of Houston.

Lockwood was a coaching intern with the Atlanta Falcons. In 2023, she joined the Philadelphia Eagles as an assistant coach. She coached the team during the 2023 Super Bowl at which point she became the first Black women to coach in a Super Bowl. With the 2025 Philadelphia Eagles win over the Kansas City Chiefs in Super Bowl LIX, she also became the first Black woman coach to win a Super Bowl.
