= Taskrabbit =

American online task marketplace

- Type: Subsidiary
- Founded: 2008; 18 years ago (as RunMyErrand)
- Founder: Leah Solivan
- Headquarters: None, distributed company
- Area served: United States, Canada, United Kingdom, France, Germany, Italy, Portugal, Spain, and Monaco
- Key people: Ania Smith (CEO)
- Services: Online marketplace
- Parent: IKEA
- Website: www.taskrabbit.com

Taskrabbit, Inc. d/b/a Taskrabbit operates an online marketplace that matches freelance labor with local demand, allowing people to find help with tasks including personal assistance, furniture assembly, moving, delivery, and handyman work. The company was founded in 2008 by Leah Solivan and was acquired by an affiliate of IKEA in 2017.

More than 200,000 independent workers use the Taskrabbit platform.

== History ==
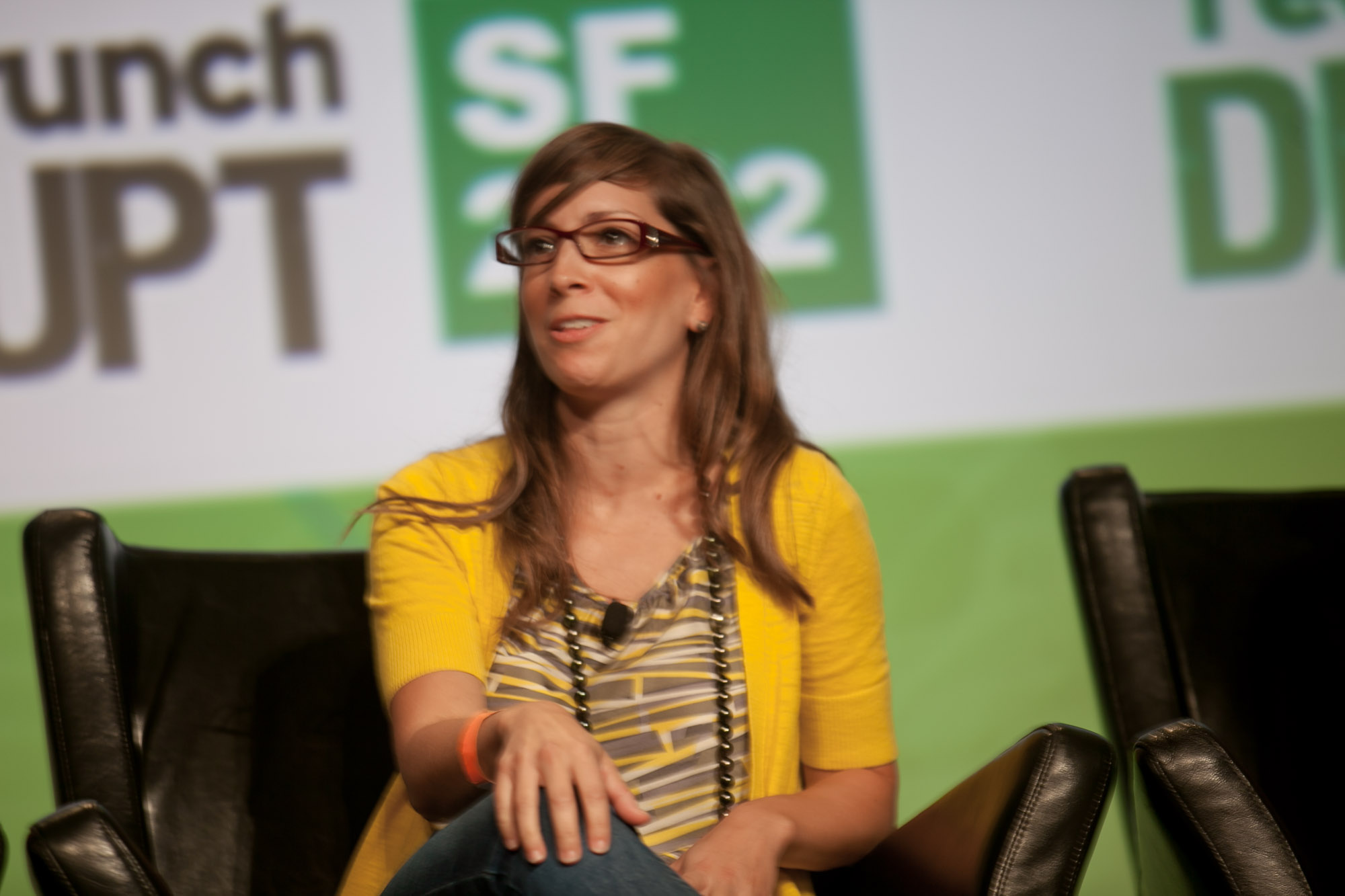
Taskrabbit founder Leah Solivan at TechCrunch Disrupt (2012)

=== 2008 to 2016 ===
The company was founded as RunMyErrand in Boston in 2008, during the Great Recession, by Leah Solivan, a former software engineer for IBM. She got the idea to start the company when she needed dog food but didn’t have time to get it herself.

In 2009, the company received funding from Facebook's startup incubator, fbFund, and Tim Ferriss became an advisor.

In 2010, the name of the company was changed from RunMyErrand to Taskrabbit. The company also moved its headquarters to San Francisco.

In May 2011, Taskrabbit raised a $5 million Series A financing round from Shasta Ventures, First Round Capital, Baseline Ventures, Floodgate Fund, Collaborative Fund, 500 Startups, and Lisa Gansky. In July 2011, Taskrabbit launched a mobile app for iOS. At that time, the company had 1,500 active taskers.

In October 2011, former Hotwire.com CEO Eric Grosse was named CEO. At that time, the company had operations in Boston, the San Francisco Bay Area, New York City; Chicago; Los Angeles; and Orange County, California. In December 2011, Taskrabbit received an additional $17.8 million in a Series B round of funding from existing investors as well as Lightspeed Venture Partners, Allen & Company, and The Tornante Company. It also engaged Michael Eisner as an advisor. At the time, the firm had 35 employees and generated $4 million in business each month.

In 2012, Solivan reassumed the role of CEO, with Grosse staying on with the company's board of directors, advising on strategy and operations. The company raised $13 million in funding, bringing its total funding to $37.5 million.

In January 2013, the company hired Stacy Brown-Philpot, formerly of Google, as the company's first COO. In March 2013, "Taskrabbit Business" was launched. It allowed businesses to hire temporary workers from the Taskrabbit users, with a 26% commission.

In November 2013, the company launched in London, its first international market. Because of declines both in bids and in completed and accepted tasks in the U.S., the company chose to test a new system in London whereby Taskers set their own rates and schedules, and when a new job was posted that matched their profile, the platform would send them an alert. The first to respond got the job. In London, the results were positive: almost all the company's metrics improved, and the average amount of money that individual Taskers on the platform were taking home increased. In June and July 2014, Taskrabbit began implementing this new format in all markets. The new format was met with significant backlash from the Tasker community. Taskrabbit incorporated some of the feedback into an updated version of its app that launched in January 2015. In 2014, Taskrabbit received 4,000 applications to be a tasker; it received 15,000 applications in 2015.

In 2016, Stacy Brown-Philpot was promoted from chief operating officer to CEO, and former CEO and founder Leah Solivan became executive chairwoman. In late 2016, Taskrabbit increased its fees by discontinuing its 15% service fee for repeat customers and introducing a 30% service fee for all tasks. It also increased its Trust & Support fee from 5% to 7.5%.

=== 2017 to present ===
By January 2017, the company had 55,000 active taskers. In September 2017, the company was acquired by the IKEA Group.

In February 2018, Taskrabbit began operations in Birmingham, Bristol, and Manchester. In March 2018, IKEA launched a furniture assembly service from Taskrabbit in the U.S. In April 2018, the company was affected by a data breach. At that time it had 60,000 taskers and 1.5 million users. In September 2018, Taskrabbit expanded to Toronto, Vancouver, Montreal, and other Canadian cities. In December 2018, the company launched operations in Brighton, Cardiff, Coventry, Liverpool, Warrington, Oxford, and Reading.

In September 2019, Taskrabbit launched service in Paris and followed it with a rollout to other French cities. In October 2019, the company launched in Germany, with operations in Berlin, Bochum, Cologne, Dortmund, Duisburg, Düsseldorf, Essen, Gelsenkirchen, Krefeld, Monchengladbach, Oberhausen, Wuppertal and the Rhine-Ruhr metropolitan region. Taskrabbit was the subject of a class action lawsuit in which 10,000 taskers alleged that they had been improperly labeled as "independent contractors" rather than employees. On August 17, 2020, the plaintiff was awarded $1.75 million by the court.

In January 2020, Taskrabbit launched service in 39 cities in Spain. In August 2020, Brown-Philpot resigned as CEO. Taskrabbit named Ania Smith, formerly of Walmart, Expedia, Airbnb, and UberEats, its new CEO. In November 2020, the company launched service in Portugal, with operations in Lisbon, Porto, Braga, Coimbra, and Faro.

In March 2021, Taskrabbit launched in Italy in Rome and Milan.

In May 2022, Taskrabbit announced that it would close its physical offices, including its San Francisco, California headquarters, and transition to becoming a distributed company, with all employees engaging in remote work. Taskrabbit launched a global brand refresh, introducing an all lower-case wordmark with two different "a" characters. The company also removed the image of the "rabbit" from its logo and updated its default brand colors. In July 2022, Taskrabbit launched service in Monaco.

In November 2024, Taskrabbit acquired Dolly, which was a moving services company based in Seattle. The two brands continued to operate separately. In June 2025, Taskrabbit added Partner Pages, customizable landing pages for retailers to offer on-demand services like assembly and installation to customers.

== Operations ==
Taskrabbit functions as a marketplace in which users seeking help post jobs and workers, called "Taskers", are suggested based on the best fit for rates, skills, and availability. Tasks can include errands, house cleaning, help moving, assembling furniture, and other chores. Users can then select a specific Tasker and send a booking request to be confirmed by the Tasker.

The platform handles payment of the Tasker and allows the user to leave a review or get customer service. Users can also opt to give the Tasker a tip through the platform, with Taskers receiving 100% of tips. Taskers undergo criminal background checks and other screenings when setting up their profiles.

After IKEA's parent company acquired Taskrabbit in 2017, the store in 2018 piloted a service at select stores for shoppers to reserve Taskrabbit assembly via Taskrabbit's platform after purchasing furniture. In June 2023, IKEA Canada added the ability to book Taskrabbit assembly as part of the purchase process on IKEA's site or in-store. This was later implemented in other markets in Europe and the United States.

As of June 2025, Taskrabbit operated in eight countries; it also operates in all 50 U.S. states.

== Reception ==
Taskrabbit has been criticized by users and in the media for high fees on tasks; fees added by the platform can be as high as 70% of the original bid. Users of the platform have complained that this contributes to an exploitative attitude by clients using the platform. Taskers have also complained that decisions taken by the platform have detrimental effects on taskers, and leave them no recourse to address their grievances. In 2016, MIT Technology Review wrote about the research related to racial and gender biases in Fiverr and Taskrabbit's recommendation algorithms. Taskrabbit's "Happiness pledge" which allows users to claim up to $10,000 for damages caused by taskers has been criticized as deceptive due to numerous exclusions and clauses. The company has also been criticized for its terms of service, which claim indemnity even in cases where a court determines taskers can be legally classified as employees.

== In popular culture ==
- The Unbreakable Kimmy Schmidt episode "Kimmy Bites an Onion!" centers on a character creating a song for the service.
- The iCarly (2021) episode "iGot Your Back" parodies the service as PostRabbit.
- In Single All The Way, the main character Nick subsidizes his career as a writer by working as a handyman for Taskrabbit.
- In Killing It, a cash-hungry character Jillian works for Taskrabbit.
- In Magic for Humans' episode "Guilt Trip" (aired December 4, 2019), a character telecommutes with a Tasker.
- The Silicon Valley episode "Exit Event" series references Taskrabbit.
- In the Girls5eva episode "Triumphant Return to the Studio", Dawn searches Taskrabbit for "geriatric button pushers with no opinions."
