= Leah Solivan =

American entrepreneur (born 1979)

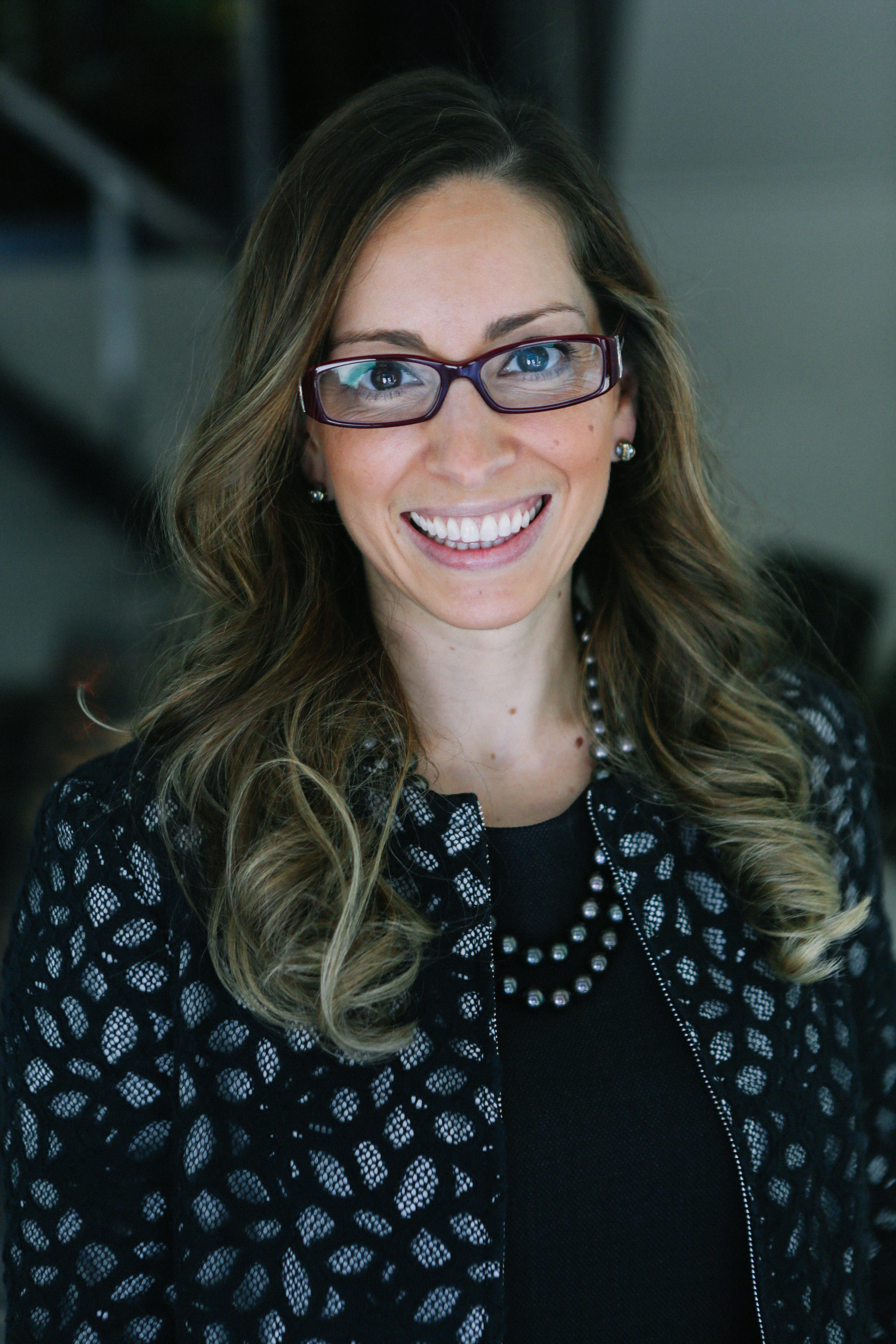
- Born: November 15, 1979 (age 46)
- Education: Sweet Briar College
- Occupations: General Partner at Fuel Capital; Founder of TaskRabbit
- Spouse: Michael Breyer

Leah Solivan (née Busque; born November 15, 1979) is an American entrepreneur, venture capitalist, and founder of TaskRabbit.

She is a general partner at Fuel Capital and serves on several corporate and nonprofit boards, including PetMed Express.

== Biography ==
Solivan graduated from Sweet Briar College in 2001, earning a Bachelor of Science in Mathematics and Computer Science. She previously served on the college's board of directors. Prior to RunMyErrand, Solivan was an IBM Corp. engineer.

== Career ==
Solivan has held several governance and leadership positions. In June 2024 she joined the board of directors of PetMed Express, later becoming chair of the Compensation and Human Capital Committee and a member of the Governance and Nominating Committee. She has remained closely connected to Sweet Briar College through committee and trustee service. A long-time member of the Young Presidents’ Organization (YPO), she has received the organization’s Alexander Capello Award and chairs the Pacific U.S. Regional Board.

=== IBM and TaskRabbit ===
While still living in Boston in 2008, Solivan founded RunMyErrand, which she later described as an attempt to create a system for outsourcing everyday tasks after realizing there was no easy way to get simple errands done. Under Solivan’s leadership, TaskRabbit raised more than $50 million in venture funding, expanded to over 40 cities, and became one of the first major companies in the emerging gig economy. She served as CEO until 2016 before transitioning to Executive Chairwoman, and in 2017 IKEA acquired the company.

=== Fuel Capital ===
In 2017, Solivan joined Fuel Capital as a general partner, where she manages multiple early-stage funds and invests in technology, consumer products, marketplaces, retail, education, and hardware.

Precedent Collective

Solivan has launched Precedent Collective, a new investment initiative focused on supporting early-stage investors from underrepresented groups. Solivan serves as managing director.
