= Giuseppe Collignon =

Italian painter

Giuseppe Collignon (March 2, 1778 – February 10, 1863) was an Italian painter born in Castelnuovo Berardenga. He worked in a neoclassical style, painting mainly historical subjects.

== Biography ==
He was a contemporary of Pietro Benvenuti and Luigi Sabatelli. In 1800 he won a prize at the Academy of Fine Arts of Florence for an oil painting of Joseph sold by his brothers. He frescoed two rooms in the Pitti Palace (Room of Psyche and Room of Prometheus). The latter is painted with frescoes of the Chariot of the Sun obscured by Minerva and Prometheus. In 1811, he was named Academic Professor of Merit at the Accademia di San Luca in Rome. One of his masterworks was Death of Sophonisba (1840, Milan). He moved to Siena to direct its Academy of Fine Arts, but in 1840 left the position due to illness. He died in Florence.
