= Kelsey Merritt =

Filipino model

- Born: Kelsey Alaine Merritt; October 1, 1996 (age 30); Pampanga, Philippines
- Citizenship: Philippines; United States
- Education: Ateneo de Manila University
- Occupation: Model
- Years active: 2011–present
- Modeling information
- Height: 1.73 m (5 ft 8 in)
- Hair color: Brown
- Eye color: Dark brown
- Agency: IMG Models (New York); Nomad Management (Los Angeles, Miami)

Kelsey Alaine Merritt (born October 1, 1996) is a Filipino and American model. In 2018, she became the first Filipino to walk the Victoria's Secret Fashion Show. Merritt was also featured in the Sports Illustrated Swimsuit Issue for three years in a row, and has appeared in advertisements for brands like DKNY, Calvin Klein, and Polo Ralph Lauren.

== Life and career ==
Merritt was born on October 1, 1996, in Pampanga, Philippines, to a Filipina mother and an American father. In May 2017, she graduated from Ateneo de Manila University in Quezon City, Metro Manila, with a degree in communications. She has been modelling in the Philippines from a young age and is currently based in New York City and Los Angeles.

Before modelling, Merritt worked at a local coffee shop, when she was only 15. Merritt was scouted as a model aged 15, and her first major shoot was for a fashion editorial in Candy Magazine. She was subsequently cast in shows at Philippine Fashion Week and in commercials. Until one day while still in college, Merritt stumbled upon an email that offered her the opportunity to model in New York. "I was discovered by this New York director for Wilhelmina Models at that time on Instagram. I remember I was a sophomore in college, and I was doing a paper and I got an email. And it said 'Modeling in the Big Apple,'" she recalled. The Filipino model was 17 years old when the New York director reached out to her. "It was really this legit guy who discovered Coco Rocha. My dad talked to him for two hours because he was telling me to go to New York on my own. My dad wouldn't let me. I was like 'I'm good, I'm old, I can do it.' But now in hindsight, I'm like okay, that was fair," she shared. However, since she was well into the first semester of her sophomore year of college at the time, Wilhelmina had to wait.

In April 2015, at the age of 18, from the Philippines, Merritt flew to New York and officially signed with Wilhelmina Models. From then on while juggling her studies with modeling work abroad, Merritt secured numerous global and regional campaigns for numerous international brands, including work with Vera Wang famously photographed by Patrick Demarchelier and a commercial and campaign for Maybelline working as a background model alongside main cast top model Gigi Hadid, Emily DiDonato, and Jourdan Dunn. And global print ad for Uniqlo's Re-Jean campaign. Working with international magazines like L'Officiel and Harper's Bazaar editorials.

After foundational years with Wilhelmina Models, Merritt switched her modeling agency to Supreme Management in New York which eventually lead and caught the eye of Victoria's Secret brand and cast her as the catalogue model and then, later on famously booked the Victoria's Secret Fashion Show in 2018, Sports Illustrated Swimsuit Issue in 2019, and the features of Vogue, Harper's Bazaar, and Elle magazine beauty in their designated Youtube channel.

In 2018, Merritt walked for the Victoria's Secret Fashion Show in New York, her first international runway show. She was the first Filipino model to walk the runway.

On October 9, 2019, Merritt posted on her Instagram that she signed with her new management, The Society, in New York City.

She was featured three times consecutively in the pages of the 2019, 2020, and 2021 Sports Illustrated Swimsuit Issue. Merritt had also appeared as the main front cover model for Sports Illustrated Swimsuit 2022 Day-at-a-Time Box Calendar and the Sports Illustrated Swimsuit Wall calendars alongside models like Camille Kostek, Olivia Culpo, and Jasmine Sanders.

In February 2020, Merritt booked her first Milan fashion show, walking down the runway for Philipp Plein ready-to-wear Fall/Winter 2020-2021 during the Milan Fashion Week photographed by Ellen von Unwerth.

Merritt had appeared on the magazine covers for L'Officiel Philippines, Cosmopolitan Philippines, Vanidades, Ocean Drive, Modeliste, Haute Living New York, and Filipino magazine covers such as Metro Magazine, Metro Society, Metro Style, Mega, Rogue, Preview, Candy, and Chalk. Editorials for Vogue Philippines, Harper's Bazaar Beauty Vietnam, L'Officiel, Women's Health USA, Galore.

Merritt also made appearances in major international fashion magazines such as Vogue, Harper's Bazaar, Elle, and Allure, as to the aforementioned, featuring her on their YouTube channel in relation to beauty talks. In 2018, British Vogue dubbed Kelsey Merritt a "rising star".

Merritt has been in advertisements, campaigns, and/or catalogues for the numerous clothing brands including Vera Wang, Victoria's Secret, Calvin Klein, DKNY, Polo Ralph Lauren, Abercrombie & Fitch, H&M, Next, Uniqlo, Forever 21, Skims, Calzedonia, Frame, Aritzia, Anthropologie, Free People, Vuori, LoveShackFancy, Lilly Pulitzer, Urban Outfitters, Tommy Bahama, Dynamite Clothing.

In February 2023, Merritt and male model Mathieu Simoneau starred together in the Calvin Klein Athletic (2023) campaign. The two modeled alongside one another showcasing the global brand's premium activewear and underwear collections. They led the promotional rollouts focusing on breathable, high-performance athleisure and classic minimalist pieces.

In December 2023, Merritt and Brazilian model Samile Bermannelli starred as the face of the DKNY Tech Ski campaign, which launched the brand's inaugural luxury winter capsule collection. The campaign photos which was inspired by the Northern Lights were shot by fashion photographer Tom Schirmacher, featuring makeup by Maud Laceppe.

In August 2024, Merritt headed the Polo Ralph Lauren × Olympics campaign capturing the preppy, athletic aesthetic of the Ralph Lauren's Olympic collection. The high-profile editorial was shot by renowned fashion photographer Hans Neumann in Paris, France.

Merritt have often collaborated with British fine-art photographer David Yarrow on cinematic, highly-stylized photographic campaigns. Their work together often features vintage, Wild West, or European aesthetics, with Merritt serving as the muse for several of Yarrow's major releases. Merritt's acting and modeling on Yarrow's sets are frequently highlighted by the photographer for her ability to bring grace, confidence, and a tough-yet-elegant sovereignty to the visual stories.

After more than six years with The Society Management in New York City. On June 5, 2026, IMG Models announced on their social media pages that they were representing Merritt, officially added to their roster of models based in New York City.

In September 2026, Kelsey Merritt is the featured cover star for the New York issue of Haute Living, the magazine tackled about her life beyond the runway.

In early October 2026, Kelsey Merritt is featured in the advertisement of the Eberjey Holiday 2026 campaign, fronting the seasonal collection of their luxury loungewear and sleepwear brand.

In November 2026, L'Officiel Philippines unveiled Kelsey Merritt as their magazine cover star on its print issue edition, photographed in New York City, USA.
