= Grede =

Grede is a surname. Notable people with the surname include:

- Emma Grede (born 1982), British businesswoman and company founder
- Jens Grede (born 1978), Swedish businessman
- Kjell Grede (1936–2017), Swedish film director
