= Jens Grede =

Swedish businessman (born 1978)

- Born: 25 February 1978 (age 48); Bälinge, Uppsala County, Sweden
- Occupations: Businessman; entrepreneur
- Years active: 1997–present
- Spouse: Emma Grede (m. 2012)
- Children: 4
- Parents: Kjell Grede (father); Anita Grede (mother)

Jens Grede (born 25 February 1978) is a Swedish businessman and entrepreneur. He is best known for co-founding the marketing group Saturday Group, the digital advertising agency Wednesday Agency Group, the fashion retail company Frame, and the shapewear and clothing brand Skims with Kim Kardashian, and also founding partner of Skims alongside his wife, Emma Grede, and Kardashian.

== Early life ==
Jens Grede was born on 25 February 1978, in Bälinge, Uppsala County, Sweden, and raised in Nyköping, Södermanland County. He is the son of film director Kjell Grede, and textile artist Anita Grede (née Holmberg).

== Career ==
In 1997, Grede left school and began working as the managing editor of Stockholm New, a magazine based in Stockholm. In 2000, Grede was invited by Canadian journalist and entrepreneur Tyler Brûlé to relocate to London to work at his creative and branding agency, Winkreative. While at Winkreative, Grede helped with the rebrand of Swiss International Air Lines, and helped design the fashion identity and logo for Stella McCartney's self-titled fashion label. Grede also met his future business partner, Erik Torstensson, while working at the company.

In 2003, Grede left the agency and co-founded the marketing group Saturday Group with Torstensson. In 2008, Grede joined the company Independent Talent Brand (ITB) Worldwide, a London-based talent management and entertainment marketing agency, founded by his future wife, Emma Grede, as a founding shareholder. In 2018, ITB was acquired by global marketing and public relations agency Rogers & Cowan for an undisclosed amount, and Grede exited the company. In 2009, Grede co-founded the creative and digital advertising agency Wednesday, which operated as a sister company to Saturday Group. The company's clients include Calvin Klein, Tory Burch LLC, Theory, Net-a-Porter, and H&M. In 2014, Saturday Group and Wednesday merged into a single company called Wednesday Agency Group. In 2016, the company sold a majority stake to BBDO Worldwide.

In 2012, Grede co-founded the fashion retail company Frame, also with Torstensson. In 2019, Grede co-founded the shapewear and clothing brand Skims with Kim Kardashian. Grede, Kardashian, and his wife, Emma Grede, are the company's founding partners. Grede is the company's CEO and, together with Kardashian, collectively holds a majority ownership stake in the company. As of 2025, the company is valued at over $5 billion.

== Personal life ==
In 2012, Grede married Emma Grede (née Findlay), the British co-founder of Good American and Skims. The couple moved to Bel Air, Los Angeles, in 2017 and have four children together.
