= Tony Chambers =

British magazine editor and creative director

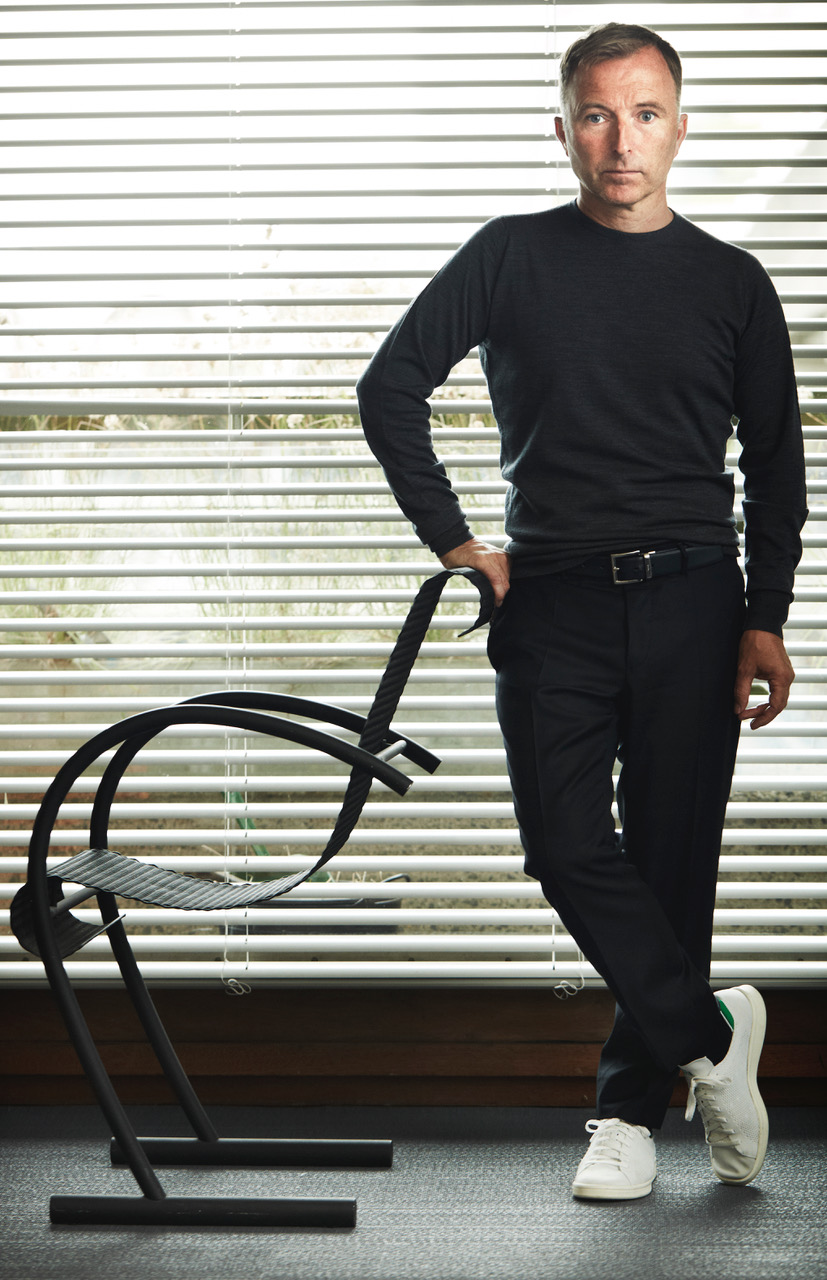
- Tony Chambers, Barbican, London 2017
- Occupations: Creative Director, Design Consultant and Editor

Tony Chambers is a Creative Director, Design Consultant and Editor. He is the Founder and Director of design consultancy TC & Friends and co-chair of Brainstorm Design, Fortune Magazine's annual design and business conference held in Singapore. From 2003 to 2018 he served as Brand and Content Director, Editor-in-Chief and Creative Director of Wallpaper* Magazine, for which he still contributes. It has been said that "he is one of the most influential arbiters of taste in the design world".

== Professional career ==
Chambers joined Wallpaper* as Creative Director in January 2003, and was appointed Editor-in-Chief in March 2007. He is the longest serving editor of the magazine and in September 2017 he was promoted to Brand and Content Director.

Under his stewardship, Wallpaper* magazine was transformed from a magazine into a multi-format global media brand. He introduced a series of over 100 pocket City Guides, a website and iPad edition, an in-house creative agency, an interior design service, and the online WallpaperSTORE*. He is also the creator of Wallpaper*Handmade, an annual exhibition at Salone del Mobile which brings together the designers, craftsmen and manufacturers to collaborate on one-of-a-kind pieces. One of his latest projects is to co-chair the development of Brainstorm Design to be held in Singapore in March 2018.

He has worked with creative personalities including Jean Nouvel, Philippe Starck, Louise Bourgeois, Karl Lagerfeld, Hedi Slimane, Christian Marclay, Kraftwerk and Zaha Hadid on guest editors' issues.

Prior to joining Wallpaper*, Tony was Art Director at British GQ and Art Editor of The Sunday Times Magazine.

He has twice been named the Professional Publishers Association's Designer of Year, and twice Editor of the Year for Lifestyle Magazines by the British Society of Magazine Editors.

Tony's design consultancy, TC & Friends, is involved in a number of high end projects, including OTOMOTO, a joint venture with artist Ryan Gander. OTOMOTO's first product is a "joyous" kitchen sink. In 2020 he launched Woman and Design joining forces with São Paulo based Etel.

=== The BSME Mark Boxer Award ===
In November 2015 Tony Chambers received the BSME's Mark Boxer Award for outstanding lifelong services to the magazine industry. It is an award that has also been won in recent years by Ian Hislop, Richard Ingrams and Nicholas Coleridge.

== Judging, talks and consultancy ==
Chambers is a member of the University of the Arts London Conferments Committee. He also serves on the judging committee of the London Design Festival Design Medal, and the judging panels of the Rijksmuseum's Rijksstudio Award, and the Perrier-Jouët Arts Salon Prize. He talks and lectures globally on design, communication, marketing and branding. Most recently at Art Basel/Miami, Marka 2017 in Istanbul, Expo Revestir in São Paulo, China Central Academy of Fine Arts and the V&A in London. In October 2018 he curated a major design auction at Sotheby's in London.

== See also ==
- Tyler Brûlé
