= Winkreative =

Swiss global creative and branding agency

Winkreative is an independently owned global creative and branding agency. Founded by the publisher, Tyler Brûlé, and headquartered in Zürich, Switzerland it focuses on narrative-based advertising and branding projects. The design work of the company is carried out at its London base called Midori House, where its sister company, Monocle magazine is also located. Winkreative has around 40 employees and handles the creative work of more than 30 clients worldwide.

== History ==
The design agency was founded as Wink Media in 1998 and later became Winkreative. In 2001, the same year Tyler Brûlé became the youngest ever recipient of the British Society of Magazine Editors' Lifetime Achievement Award, Winkreative was hired to design the "look and feel" of Swiss International Air Lines at their relaunch, after the collapse of Swissair. The rebranding project went beyond just a new look for Swiss International Air Lines, extending to the cabin's lighting and even crew uniforms.

In 2002, Brûlé sold his stake in Wallpaper* magazine and turned his focus towards the development of Winkreative. Today, the agency is a wholly owned subsidiary of Winkorp AG, also the Swiss parent company of Monocle and Trunk Clothiers.

Other past and present clients include TOTO, Tag Heuer, Sky News, Stella McCartney, and Porter Airlines.
