= Emma Grede =

British businesswoman (born 1982)

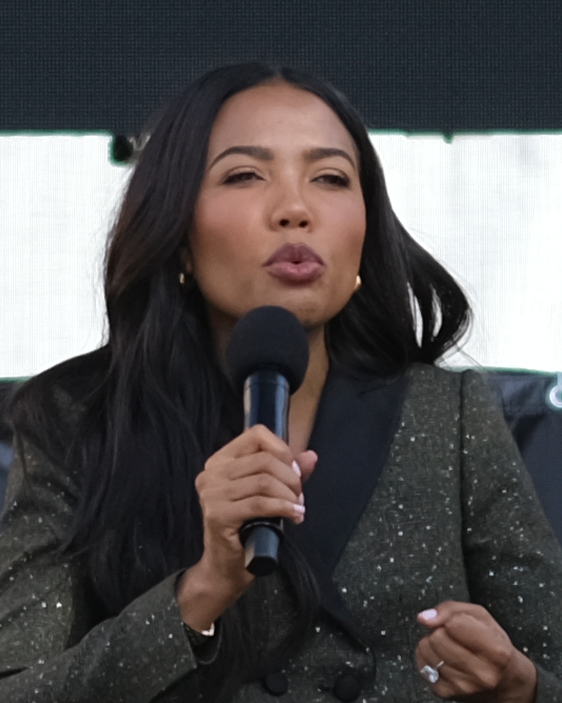
- Grede in 2026
- Born: Emma Findlay; 23 September 1982 (age 44); London, England
- Education: London College of Fashion (did not graduate)
- Occupations: Co-founder & CEO, Good American
- Years active: 2007–present
- Spouse: Jens Grede
- Children: 4

Emma Findlay Grede (born 23 September 1982) is a British businesswoman, entrepreneur and fashion designer. She is recognised for her business ventures involving members of the Kardashian family and is the CEO and co-founder of the denim company Good American, a founding partner of Skims, and co-founder of Safely.

== Early life ==
Grede was born and raised in the Plaistow neighbourhood of East London, England. She is the daughter of Jenny-Lee Findlay, an English mother who worked for Morgan Stanley. Her father is Trinidadian, but she was raised by her Jamaican step-father. She has three younger sisters, Charlotte, Rachelle, and Katie-Beth.

Starting as a teenager, Emma began working at a number of odd jobs, including delivering newspapers, which she credits for teaching her perseverance and discipline. She regularly saved her earnings to purchase magazines like Elle and Vogue and has noted that the fashion industry was a form of escapism for her.

At the age of 16, Grede enrolled at the London College of Fashion, where she also secured internships at places like Gucci. However, in order to pursue her career, she withdrew from school before completing her degree, noting that "It was the right decision for me."

== Career ==
=== Entrepreneurship ===
After leaving college, Grede worked for Quintessentially, a concierge company, before joining Inca Productions as a fashion show and events producer. In 2008, at the age of 26, Grede co-founded and was CEO of Independent Talent Brand (ITB) Worldwide, a London-based talent management and entertainment marketing agency. Ten years later, ITB was acquired by Rogers & Cowan for an undisclosed amount, and Grede exited the company. ITB's founding shareholders, Emma Grede, her husband Jens Grede and Erik Torstensson (the founders of Frame) and London agency Independent Talent Group — have exited as part of the agreement.

Around 2015, Grede proposed an idea for a denim company to Kris Jenner, whom she met during Paris Fashion Week, explaining that she wanted to partner with Jenner's daughter, Khloé Kardashian. Grede and Kardashian launched Good American in 2016, as a women's clothing company focused on size inclusivity and body positivity with Grede as CEO. The company sold a million dollars of denim merchandise on opening day. Good American expanded from strictly selling denim jeans to include dresses, activewear, tops, swimwear, sleepwear, and shoes in its line.

Grede is a founding partner of Skims, a shapewear brand co-founded by her husband Jens Grede and Kim Kardashian in 2019. Grede is the company's chief product officer. Along with Kris Jenner and Chrissy Teigen, Grede also co-founded Safely, a brand of plant-based cleaning and self-care products that launched in March 2021. Emma conceived of the company during the COVID-19 pandemic, as she desired products that would be safe for her own family. To that end, Safely's mission is "to rid American homes of harsh toxins with plant-powered products".

In January 2025, Grede teamed up with fashion designer Kristin Juszczyk to launch apparel brand Off Season in collaboration with the NFL and Fanatics.

With an estimated net worth of more than $300 million, Grede has an 8% stake in Skims, 23% stake in Good American, and 22% stake in Safely.

=== Media and Publications ===
Grede hosts the podcast Aspire, where she interviews founders to openly discuss wins, losses, and lessons learned along the way. Guests have included the CEO of Saie, Laney Crowell, founder of Jones Road, Bobbi Brown, and founder of Goop, Gwyneth Paltrow.

In April 2026, Grede published her first book, Start With Yourself: A New Vision for Work & Life, a business memoir.

In September 2026, Grede appeared as a guest panellist on ITVs flagship show Loose Women

=== Philanthropy ===
Emma Grede regularly addresses the need for more diverse representation amongst CEOs and entrepreneurs and has used her influence to create opportunities for people of colour, specifically. Grede is a guest shark on the first episode of season 13 and the fourteenth episode of season 14 of the reality television series Shark Tank. She is the first mixed-race woman investor on the show. In 2024, she became a guest dragon on the 21st series of Dragons' Den.

Grede also is chairwoman of the 15 Percent Pledge, an initiative for retailers to reserve 15% of their shelf space for black-owned businesses. Designer Aurora James spearheaded the movement after being inspired following the murder of George Floyd in 2020 and subsequent protests. By 2022, the non-profit helped black business owners generate $10 billion in revenue.

== Recognition ==
In November 2022, Emma, husband Jens Grede, and Kim Kardashian won the first Innovation Award presented by Amazon Fashion for Skims at the CFDA Awards in New York. With an estimated net worth of $320 million by 2023, Forbes magazine identified Grede as one of the Richest Self-Made Women in America.

In 2026, Grede took part in an online web series titled "The Career Ladder" that got her a lot of online traction.

== Personal life ==
In 2012, Grede married Jens Grede, the Swedish co-founder of Skims and the denim brand Frame. The couple moved to Bel Air, Los Angeles, in 2017 and have four children together.

In her mid-twenties, Grede learned that she is dyslexic. Despite her diagnosis, she has openly embraced her neurodiversity and credits it with contributing to her creative problem-solving and innovative business approach. In interviews, Grede has emphasised how being dyslexic pushed her to think differently and approach challenges from unique perspectives, which she believes is an asset in the entrepreneurial world.

In August 2026, she was the guest for BBC Radio 4's Desert Island Discs. Her music choices included "Ain't No Mountain High Enough" by Diana Ross and "Stand By Me" by Ben E. King. Her book choice was The Prophet by Kahlil Gibran and her luxury item a mattress and high quality bedding.
