= Geringer =

Geringer, Géringer is a surname. Notable people with the surname include:

- Alexander Geringer (born 1966), Austrian journalist, creative director, and magazine publisher
- Jim Geringer (born 1944), American politician
- Tamás Géringer (born 1999), Hungarian footballer
