= Philomina Kane =

Ghanaian-American entrepreneur

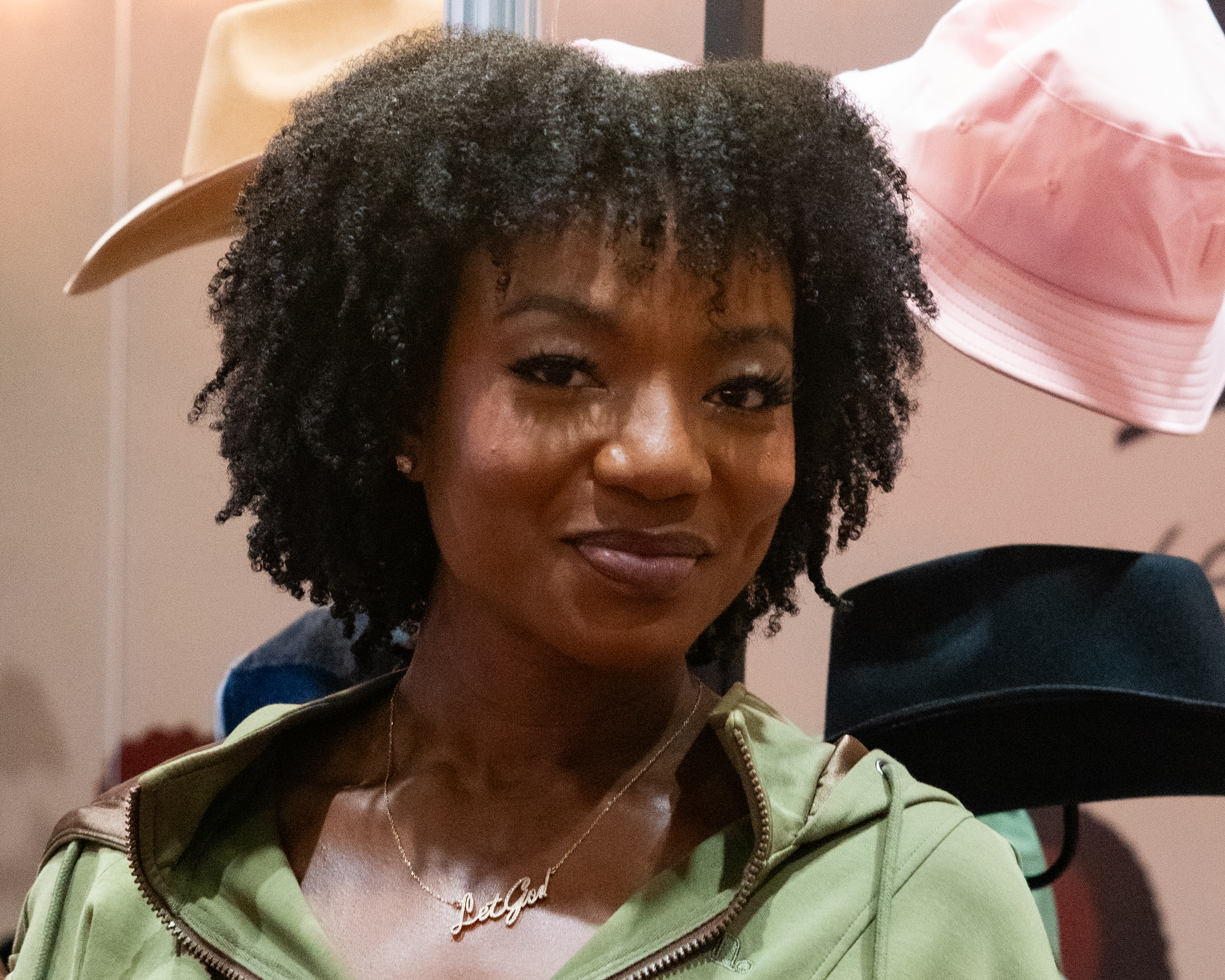
- Kane at 2026 Essence Festival of Culture

YouTube information
- Channel: YouTube channel
- Genres: Vlog; hair; beauty

Philomina Kane is a Ghanaian-American entrepreneur and founder of KIN Apparel, a clothing brand consisting of satin-lined hoodies with the goal of protecting and preventing breakage and frizz for natural hair. She appeared on Season 13 of Shark Tank and received a $200,000 investment from Emma Grede, founder of Good America and Lori Greiner. Her company KIN Apparel is an acronym for "Keeping It Natural".

== Personal life ==
Kane was born in New York to Ghanaian parents. She received a scholarship to Princeton University where she graduated with a degree in Ecological Biology. Kane played rugby at Princeton University.

Prior to founding KIN Apparel, Kane worked as a marketing director at natural haircare startup, NaturAll Club.

== Career ==
Kane started KIN Apparel with just $500. In 2021, her company generated $355,000 in sales. KIN Apparel specializes in sweatshirts with satin-lined hoods designed to prevent frizz and retain moisture for natural hair. The company also makes pillowcases, beanies, bucket hats and bonnets with satin lining. In 2021, she sold 30% of her company for $200,000 to Emma Grede and Lori Greiner. American investor and billionaire entrepreneur, Mark Cuban, passed on the deal, recommending that Kane work with an investor who could complement her creativity.

KIN Apparel's hoodies are manufactured in China. They cost $13.75 to make and retail for upwards of $80.

== YouTube ==
Kane has a YouTube channel "NaturallyPhilo" with nearly 187,000 subscribers. On her channel she documents her hair journey and gives tips to “help Black women embrace their natural hair. Her most popular video "BEST Method To Define Type 4 Curls & Coils |Natural Hair|" has 1.3 million views.
