= Saturday Group =

International company based in the United Kingdom

- Type: Privately held company
- Industry: Fashion marketing and investments
- Founded: London, England (2003)
- Founder: Jens Grede (Founder and CEO); Erik Torstensson (Founder and Chief Creative Officer)
- Headquarters: London, New York, Los Angeles, Paris, Milan
- Key people: Tugba Unkan (Group Managing Director); Glenn Jones (Chief Executive Wednesday)
- Website: saturday-group.com

Saturday Group is a marketing group that invests in and manages firms in the fields of fashion and entertainment marketing. The company is Based in London and has offices in New York, Los Angeles, Paris and Milan. In 2014 Saturday Group operates 12 separate businesses that specialize in fashion marketing, advertising, publicity, and intellectual property ownership.

== History ==
Saturday Group's two Swedish founders, Jens Grede and Erik Torstensson met while working for Tyler Brûlé at The Wallpaper* Group in London in the early 2000s., The set up a creative fashion agency, Saturday London, in 2003, with the backing of Mother Holdings.

Grede and Torstensson then founded and invested in a number of businesses related to the fashion industry. In 2008, they established Saturday Group as a holding company for their investments and activities. In 2010, Grede and Torstensson worked with Net-A-Porter to create Mr Porter, the online luxury menswear shopping website.

The pair founded two magazines, Man About Town and INDUSTRIE, acting as Editors-in-Chief for both titles, and consulted for Vogue and GQ magazines, the Gucci Group, Richemont and J Crew. In 2010 they co-founded Fashion Networks International in New York, a next generation media company which published the blogs for fashion commentators, including Elin Kling and Derek Blasberg. The company was sold to Conde Nast in 2012.

Torstensson and Grede's latest venture is clothing line Frame, which in 2014 is being stocked by Barneys, Lane Crawford, Selfridges and Nordstrom.

As of 2014, companies in the Saturday Group are active in creative, digital, e-commerce, publicity, licensing, sales and distribution, talent brokering and brand management. Among their holdings are; the creative agency Wednesday, INDUSTRIE Magazine, Tomorrow, the global distribution company and Frame, a clothing brand based in Los Angeles, California.
