= Saie =

American cosmetics brand

- Type: Private
- Industry: Cosmetics
- Founded: 2019
- Founder: Laney Crowell
- Headquarters: New York, NY
- Products: Makeup
- Website: www.saiehello.com

Saie (pronounced: say) is an American cosmetics brand known for its line of clean makeup. It is based in New York City.

== History ==
Saie was founded by Laney Crowell, a beauty blogger who had formerly worked in digital communications at Estée Lauder and StyleCaster. The brand was launched in November 2019, with a mascara, brow gel, lip balm, and lavender eyelash curlers. The products are free of toxic ingredients, with eco-friendly packaging.

Initial investors included Unilever Ventures, Toms Shoes founder Blake Mycoskie, LearnVest founder Alexa von Tobel, and Vintner's Daughter founder April Gargiulo. In April 2020, it was reported that Saie had raised a seed round, with investors including Gwyneth Paltrow.

At first, the products were sold direct to consumers. By 2020, it was also selling with Goop and Follain, later expanding to Sephora and other retailers. In 2024 the brand launched at Sephora Middle East in Bahrain, Kuwait, Oman, Qatar, Saudi Arabia, and the United Arab Emirates.

== Products ==
The brand's products include mascara, brow gel, lip balm, lip gloss, eyelash curler, highlighters, foundation, bronzer, concealer, blush, and makeup bags. Saie is a "clean makeup" line, banning more than 2,000 toxic or environmentally unfriendly ingredients from its products, such as phenoxyethanol and synthetic fragrance. Its products are manufactured in the US, Canada, and Italy.

In 2021, the brand launched Saie Vintage, a collection of merchandise created using vintage clothing.

== Initiatives ==
In October 2022, following the overturning of Roe v. Wade, Saie launched the Every Body campaign to help raise awareness for reproductive rights. The initiative brings together 63 beauty brands to benefit SisterSong, a pro-choice organization. Saie also partnered with SEEN Library for Every Body Library, a pop-up in New York City offering books on reproductive rights, feminism, and female experiences.

On Earth Day 2024, the company released The Saie Way: A Climate Docuseries, a Web series focused on their commitment to sustainability.

In 2024, the company announced the Saie Climate Initiative, a partnership with rePurpose Global to collect 5 million pounds of plastic waste by 2027, from coastlines in India, Indonesia, Cameroon, and Colombia. As part of the initiative, the company also announced its commitment to reaching net zero carbon emissions by 2039, and to establishing an all-female board of experts for the mission.

Saie participates in sustainable certification programs such as One Percent for the Planet, donating 1% of proceeds to environmental nonprofits, and is climate neutral certified and certified plastic negative.
