= Alexa von Tobel =

American businesswoman, founder and CEO of Learnvest.com

- Born: October 6, 1983 (age 43); Jacksonville, Florida, U.S.
- Education: Harvard College
- Occupation: Businesswoman
- Years active: 2009–present
- Title: Managing partner of Inspired Capital; Founder and CEO of LearnVest.com
- Spouse: Michael Ryan Jr. (m. 2013)
- Children: 3

Alexa von Tobel (born October 6, 1983) is an American businesswoman who is the founder and managing partner of Inspired Capital, an early stage venture firm. Prior to Inspired Capital, Alexa dropped out of Harvard Business School to found LearnVest, a fintech company aimed at making financial planning software affordable and accessible to millions. In 2015, LearnVest was acquired by Northwestern Mutual for nearly $375 million. Von Tobel is the author of the New York Times bestseller Financially Fearless (published December 31, 2013), Financially Forward (published May 14, 2019), and Money Matters (published March 26, 2024). Alexa is a 2016 Henry Crown Fellow and an inaugural member of the Presidential Ambassadors for Global Entrepreneurship, alongside Steve Case, Reid Hoffman, Tory Burch and others. Before producing her own podcast, American Ambition, in 2025, she hosted Inc.'s For Starters podcast (formerly The Founders Project with Alexa von Tobel) from 2019 to 2025. Prior to that, she hosted a weekly SiriusXM radio show, Financially Fearless with Alexa von Tobel. Von Tobel is a columnist for Fast Company, and a regular contributor to the Today Show and Good Morning America.

== Early life, education and family ==
Von Tobel is from Jacksonville, Florida. Her mother, Darlene Marie von Tobel, is a nurse practitioner and her father, the late Dr. Harry M. Von Tobel, worked in a private practice specializing as a developmental pediatrician. Von Tobel received a B.A. in psychology from Harvard College. She is married to Michael Ryan Jr.; they met at Harvard. The couple has three children.

== Career ==
After graduation, she worked as a trader at Morgan Stanley before leaving to be the Head of Business Development at Drop.io.

Von Tobel came up with the idea for LearnVest in 2006 while working at Morgan Stanley when she realized she and most other people had never had any formal education about how to manage their personal finances. In April 2009, Von Tobel closed a $4.5 million series A round of funding led by Accel Partners. LearnVest raised a total of $72 million while a private company, from investors including Accel Partners, American Express Ventures and Northwestern Mutual Capital.

On March 25, 2015, Northwestern Mutual Life Insurance Co., based in Milwaukee, announced it would acquire LearnVest for a reported price of $375 million. After LearnVest’s acquisition, Alexa became Northwestern Mutual's first-ever Chief Digital Officer, leading product and technology strategy as the company achieved $35 billion in annual revenue. She later became Chief Innovation Officer, overseeing Northwestern Mutual’s venture arm.

In 2019, Von Tobel launched a new early stage venture capital fund, Inspired Capital, along with Penny Pritzker. Inspired Capital's latest fund totaled $330 million, bringing the firm's commitments to nearly $1 billion.

== Awards and recognition ==
She has been honored with numerous recognitions including: a Forbes magazine cover story, Fortune’s 40 Under 40, Fortune’s Most Powerful Women, Inc. Magazine’s 30 Under 30, and World Economic Forum’s Young Global Leader. Alexa is a member of the 2016 Class of Henry Crown Fellows and an inaugural member of President Obama’s Ambassadors for Global Entrepreneurship. Additionally, Von Tobel has been included in lists like Business Insider's 2010 "Silicon Valley 100," “Women to Watch” by Forbes, “18 Women Changing the World” in Marie Claire, and BusinessWeek's annual list of “Best Young Tech Entrepreneurs.” In 2012, she was selected as a Fortune "Most Powerful Women Entrepreneur" and named a scholar at the Aspen Ideas Festival.

Von Tobel has been a featured speaker at several conferences and events such as the 2012 SXSW Interactive, TEDxWallStreet Event at NYSE, Stern Entrepreneurs Exchange Summit 2012, Ruth's Chris Steak House and Marie Claire Celebrate Female Entrepreneurs: Women in Business Speaker Series, Fortune Summit: Most Powerful Women Entrepreneurs, The George Washington University 5th Annual Women in Business Conference, and Inc.’s GrowCo Conference in 2013.
