= 15 Percent Pledge =

Non-profit organization

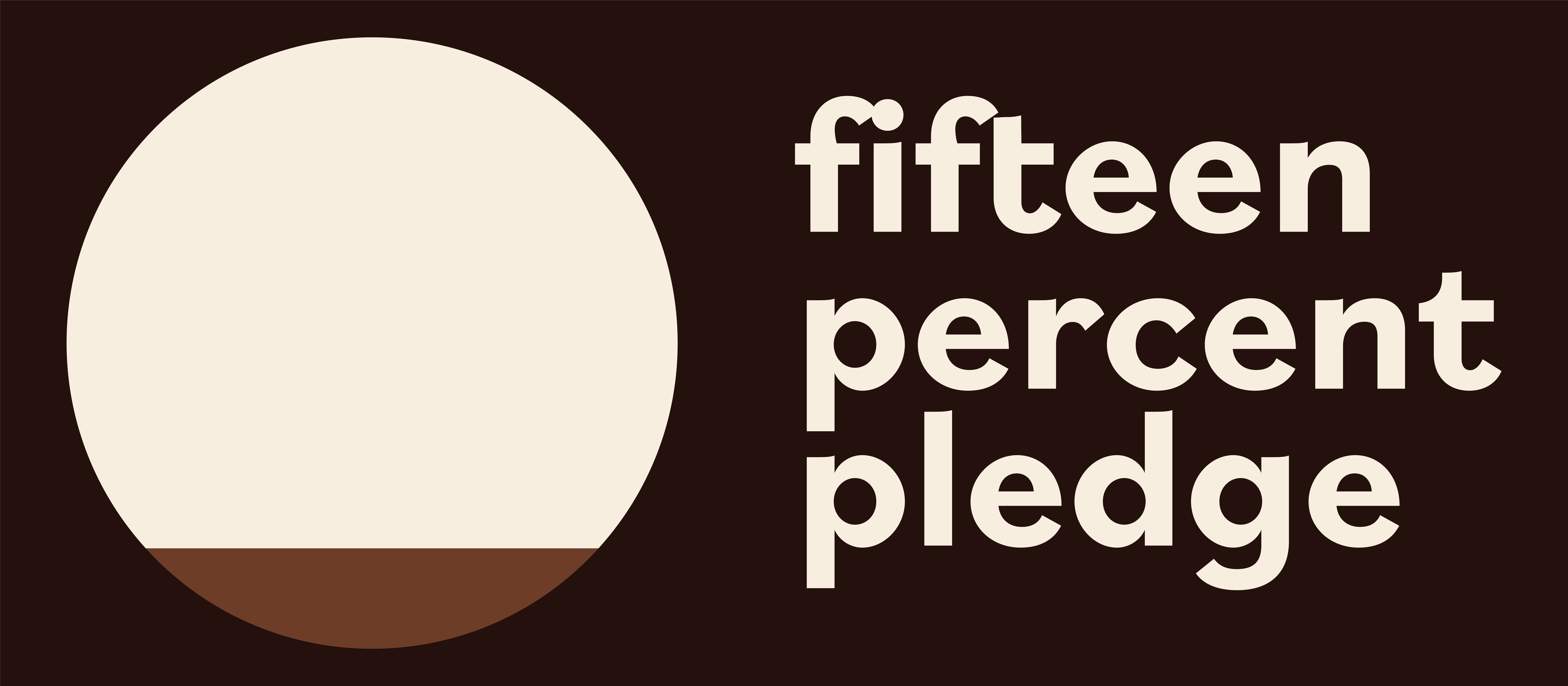
- Formation: 2020; 6 years ago
- Founder: Aurora James
- Type: Nonprofit organization
- Headquarters: New York City, U.S.
- Chairperson: Emma Grede
- Key people: Aurora James (CEO); LaToya Williams-Belfort (Executive Director)
- Staff: 16
- Website: www.15percentpledge.org

The 15 Percent Pledge is a US-based non-profit organization that encourages retailers to pledge at least 15 percent of their shelf-space to Black-owned businesses. The foundation conducts audits, shares its database of Black-owned businesses, and offers business development strategies to participating companies. It was established in 2020 by Aurora James after she created the 15 Percent Pledge initiative on Instagram, following the murder of George Floyd.

== History ==
The murder of George Floyd sparked a wave of activism for the Black Lives Matter movement that renewed calls for social justice reform and the end of systemic racism, and included declarations of support from various corporations; according to TIME Magazine, James wanted to "find a way that companies could make a tangible change," and "from there, the 15 Percent Pledge was born."

James launched the initiative called the 15 Percent Pledge with an Instagram post on May 29, 2020, that tagged Barnes & Noble, Home Depot, MedMen, Net-a-Porter, Saks Fifth Avenue, Sephora, Target, Walmart, and Whole Foods. James wrote on Instagram: "So many of your businesses are built on Black spending power. So many of your stores are set up in Black communities. So many of your sponsored posts are seen on Black feeds. This is the least you can do for us. We represent 15% of the population and we need to represent 15% of your shelf space." In August 2020, James recalled, "I was watching Black-owned businesses literally shutter before my very eyes while I was also seeing these major retailers say, 'We stand with you,'" ... "And the reality is that you actually don't."

Vogue writes the post "immediately went viral and resulted in an outpouring of interest." James then started an Instagram account for the 15 Percent Pledge and continued tagging retailers to highlight disparities impacting Black-owned businesses.

In June 2020, James told GQ, "This is a really tough time for everyone, and people shopping is by no means going to ease the pain of the lives that we have lost ... There are also a lot of other things that we need people to be doing, like donating to bail funds."

== The 15 Percent Pledge Foundation ==
After the early success of the 15 Percent Pledge initiative, the 15 Percent Pledge Foundation was created as a non-profit organization to urge major retailers to commit 15% of their shelf-space to Black-owned businesses and to build generational wealth in Black communities. The 15 Percent Pledge is registered as a domestic not-for-profit organisation in New York and fiscally sponsored by the Philanthropic Ventures Foundation, a 501(c)(3) that serves as a fiscal depository for organizations in the process of obtaining 501(c)(3) status.

The 15 Percent Pledge is more than a commitment to allocating shelf space to Black-owned businesses; companies signing the pledge are also asked to audit their contracts to determine how their spending is allocated. The foundation conducts the audit of the company each quarter, shares its database of Black-owned businesses, and offers business development strategies.

== Development ==
On June 10, 2020, Sephora was announced publicly as the first business to sign on to the 15 Percent Pledge, and said it would create an advisory group that includes James and other leaders of brands owned by people of color to help Sephora make changes. The New York Times writes Sephora also "said it would provide connections and support to black-owned businesses from funders and venture capitalists and evolve its existing incubation programs to 'focus on women of color,'" and that this is an example of the type of longer-lasting change sought by the 15 Percent Pledge. Since then, Sephora developed Sephora Accelerate, a mentoring program focused on supporting beauty brands founded by Black, indigenous and people of color.

Businesses including Rent The Runway, West Elm, and MedMen, as well as Macy's, Indigo Books & Music in Toronto, Yelp, the U.S. edition of Condé Nast's Vogue, Macy's subsidiaries Bloomingdale's and Bluemercury, and InStyle magazine have since signed on to the 15 Percent Pledge.

In August 2020, the 15 Percent Pledge Foundation conducted audits of retailers, including Target, Whole Foods, Nordstrom, and Neiman Marcus, and according to Reuters, found "Black-owned businesses currently constitute on average just 1% of U.S. retailers' supplier base."

In September 2020, James asked Canadian retailers to take the 15 Percent Pledge in a Toronto Star opinion article, and CBC News reports "James said the Canadian effort was launched partly in response to feedback she got from Canadians who got in touch as a result of the U.S. campaign to say that retailers such as Hudson's Bay and Holt Renfrew can do better." Indigo Books and Music became the first Canadian company to take the 15 Percent Pledge.

In April 2021, the foundation publicly addressed the announcement by Target of its plan to spend more than $2 billion on Black-owned businesses by 2025, with a statement that included, "We should not be applauding this. We deserve so much more than this" and an allegation that Target had copied the foundation's branding, which Target denied. James told CNBC in May 2021, "Whether or not Target wants to take the pledge or any of these other companies want to take the pledge, we're still going to keep holding their feet to the fire and pushing them to do more."

By May 2021, the 15 Percent Pledge Foundation had 25 retail partners.

Currently 29 companies have committed to the pledge including Ulta Beauty, Nordstrom, Banana Republic, Moda Operandi, Kith, J.Crew, Blue Mercury and Victoria's Secret.

In 2022, Google partnered with the foundation to offer a $200,000 grant to a black entrepreneur.

In November 2023, the 15 Percent Pledge Foundation and Sephora announced the 'Sephora Beauty Grant', which awarded a black business owner within the beauty industry $100,000.
