= Monocle (brand) =

Lifestyle magazine

- Cover of issue 151, 15th anniversary special (March 2022)
- Editor in chief and chairman: Tyler Brûlé
- Magazine editor: Andrew Tuck
- Categories: Culture, international affairs, design, fashion, travel, business
- Frequency: 10 issues per year, plus The Forecast, The Escapist and The Drinking and Dining Directory
- Publisher: Anders Braso
- Total circulation: 80,251 (ABC total) (1 July 2015 – 31 December 2016)
- Founded: 15 February 2007; 19 years ago, London
- First issue: 15 February 2007; 19 years ago, London
- Company: Winkreative Ltd
- Country: International
- Based in: London, UK, with offices in Tokyo, Toronto, Hong Kong and Zurich
- Language: English
- Website: monocle.com
- ISSN: 1753-2434

Monocle is a global affairs and lifestyle magazine published by Winkreative Ltd. It also operates a 24-hour internet radio station, a retail business, and an associated website. The magazine was founded in London in 2007 by Tyler Brûlé, a Canadian entrepreneur and co-founder of Wallpaper* magazine.

In 2014, Brûlé sold a minority stake in Monocle to Japanese publisher Nikkei Inc., valuing the company at approximately US$115 million. The size of the investment was not disclosed. In December of the same year, the magazine introduced The Forecast, a seasonal publication. A travel-focused title, The Escapist, followed in 2015.

== Operations ==
=== Print and publishing ===
==== Magazine ====
Brûlé launched Monocle in February 2007 as a print magazine, financed by a group of private investors. It is published 10 times a year and is printed entirely in English. The publication has been described by journalists as a lifestyle magazine aimed at globally mobile professionals.

In 2010, the magazine introduced seasonal print newspapers: Monocle Mediterraneo during the summer, and Monocle Alpino in winter. Both were discontinued in 2014 and replaced by annual publications The Forecast and The Escapist. As of that time, Monocle did not maintain official accounts on major social media platforms.

The magazine contains both traditional advertising and sponsored content, including in-house reports and surveys.

==== Books ====
In 2013, Monocle collaborated with the Berlin-based publisher Gestalten to release its first book, The Monocle Guide to Better Living. Several other titles followed, including The Monocle Guide to Good Business, The Monocle Guide to Cosy Homes, How to Make a Nation: A Monocle Guide, and The Monocle Guide to Drinking and Dining. The magazine also co-publishes a series of travel guides covering various international cities.

==== Radio ====
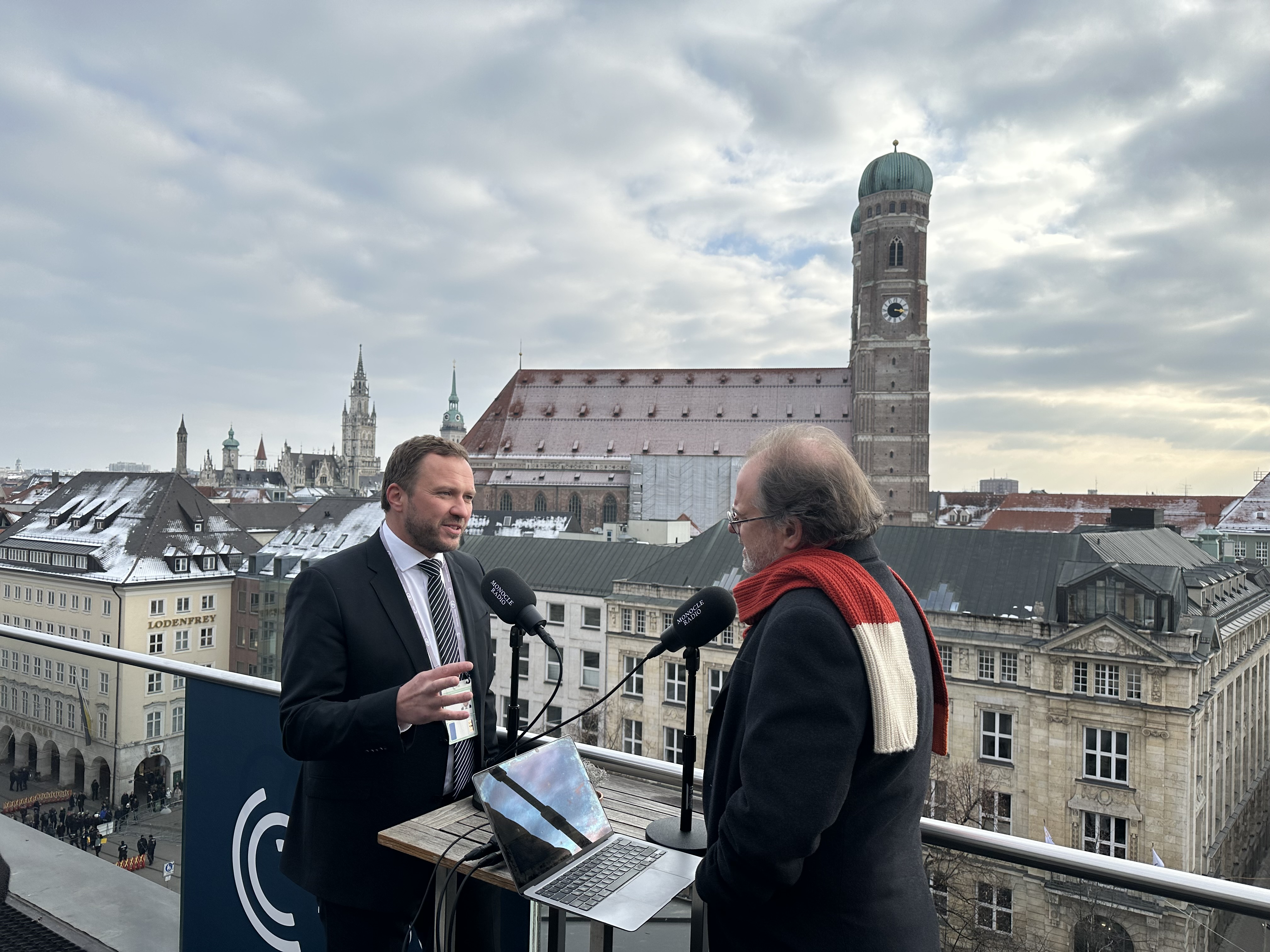
Estonian official interviewed at the 2025 Munich Security Conference by Monocle Radio

Monocle Radio is an English-language internet radio station broadcasting from Midori House in London. Launched as Monocle 24 in October 2011, it airs weekday news programmes and weekly shows on business, culture, design, food, media, and urban affairs, available live and on demand.

The station grew out of The Monocle Weekly, a podcast launched in December 2008 by Andrew Tuck and Robert Bound. Its shows have included The Globalist, The Briefing, The Urbanist, and The Entrepreneurs. Brûlé has described the station as following a Commonwealth-style public service model, with presenters drawn from Monocle staff and contributing broadcasters in its overseas bureaux. Sponsors have included UBS, Novartis, and Allianz. A monthly podcast, Konfekt Korner, is produced with its sister publication Konfekt.

==== Monocle TV ====
In early 2011, six episodes of a Monocle television programme were broadcast internationally on Bloomberg.

=== Website ===
Monocle's website offers digital access to its magazine archive, with full content available to subscribers and a limited number of free articles per issue. It also hosts over 500 publicly accessible films, slideshows, and documentaries, which are additionally distributed via iTunes and YouTube.

Retail products, including in-house designs and selected collaborations, are available through the website and in Monocle retail locations worldwide. The website also streams Monocle 24, the company’s radio station, and provides access to its archive of speech-based programmes.

The site launched alongside the magazine in 2007 and underwent a redesign in November 2012. In 2013, it received several Lovie Awards, including Gold for Best Writing – Editorial, Silver for Lifestyle, and Bronze for Best Practices.

=== Retail and hospitality ===
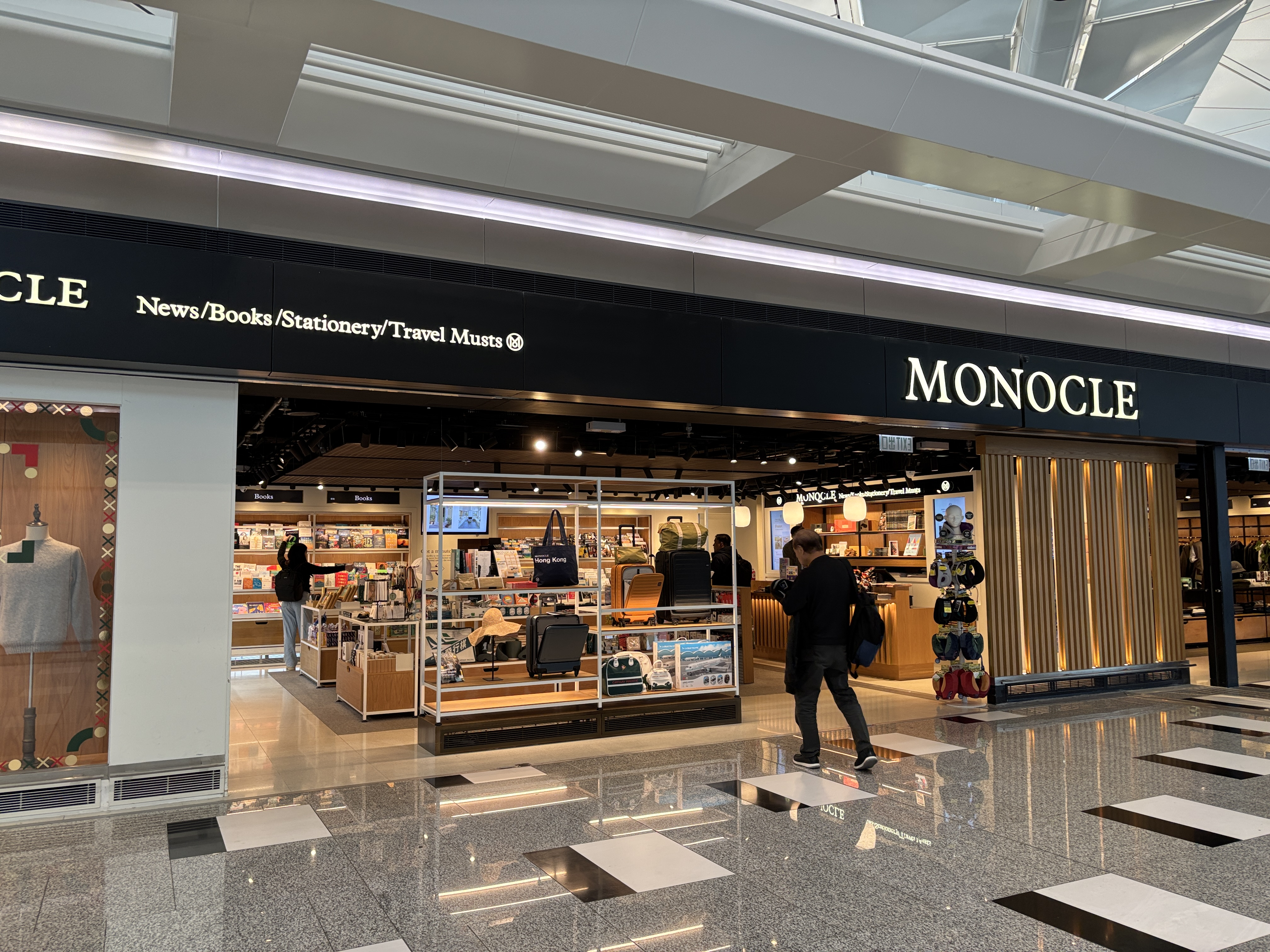
The Monocle store at Hong Kong International Airport in 2026

==== Retail ====
Monocle opened its first retail store in London in November 2008, later expanding to cities including Hong Kong, Toronto, Tokyo, Singapore, New York, Culver City, and Meran. The stores sell Monocle-branded items and collaborative products, and the company also operates seasonal pop-up locations.

==== Café ====
In April 2013, Monocle opened a café on Chiltern Street in Marylebone, London. Additional cafés were later opened in Tokyo and in the Seefeld district of Zurich, sometimes integrated with retail spaces.

In 2015, the company launched Kioskafé, a newsstand and coffee bar near London Paddington station, modelled on European kiosks. It stocked a range of print publications but closed during the COVID-19 pandemic.

== Projects ==
=== Monocle surveys ===
Monocle publishes an annual Quality of Life issue that ranks 25 cities worldwide based on perceived liveability metrics. In 2016, Tokyo topped the ranking.

Since 2010, the magazine has also compiled an annual Soft Power survey, assessing countries by their global influence through culture, diplomacy, and trade. In 2016, the United States led the ranking.

=== Conferences ===
In 2015, Monocle introduced the Quality of Life Conference, first held in Lisbon and later in Vienna in 2016. The event brings together speakers from fields including design, urbanism, and culture. The host city varies from year to year.

== Reception ==
=== Accolades ===
In 2011, Monocle was named one of the top ten magazines of the year by AdAge as part of its "A List". Editor Tyler Brûlé received the title of Editor of the Year in the same feature. In 2015, the magazine received a D&AD Wood Pencil award for its annual publication, The Forecast.

=== Criticisms ===
In 2018, former intern Amalia Illgner published an article in The Guardian describing her experience at Monocle's London office, where she reported being paid £30 per day. The matter was resolved following an employment tribunal, which resulted in Monocle admitting liability and reaching a settlement.

== See also ==
- Luxury magazine
- Departures
- Worth
- Robb Report
- High net worth individual
