= Skims =

American fashion company founded by Kim Kardashian and Jens Grede

SKIMS

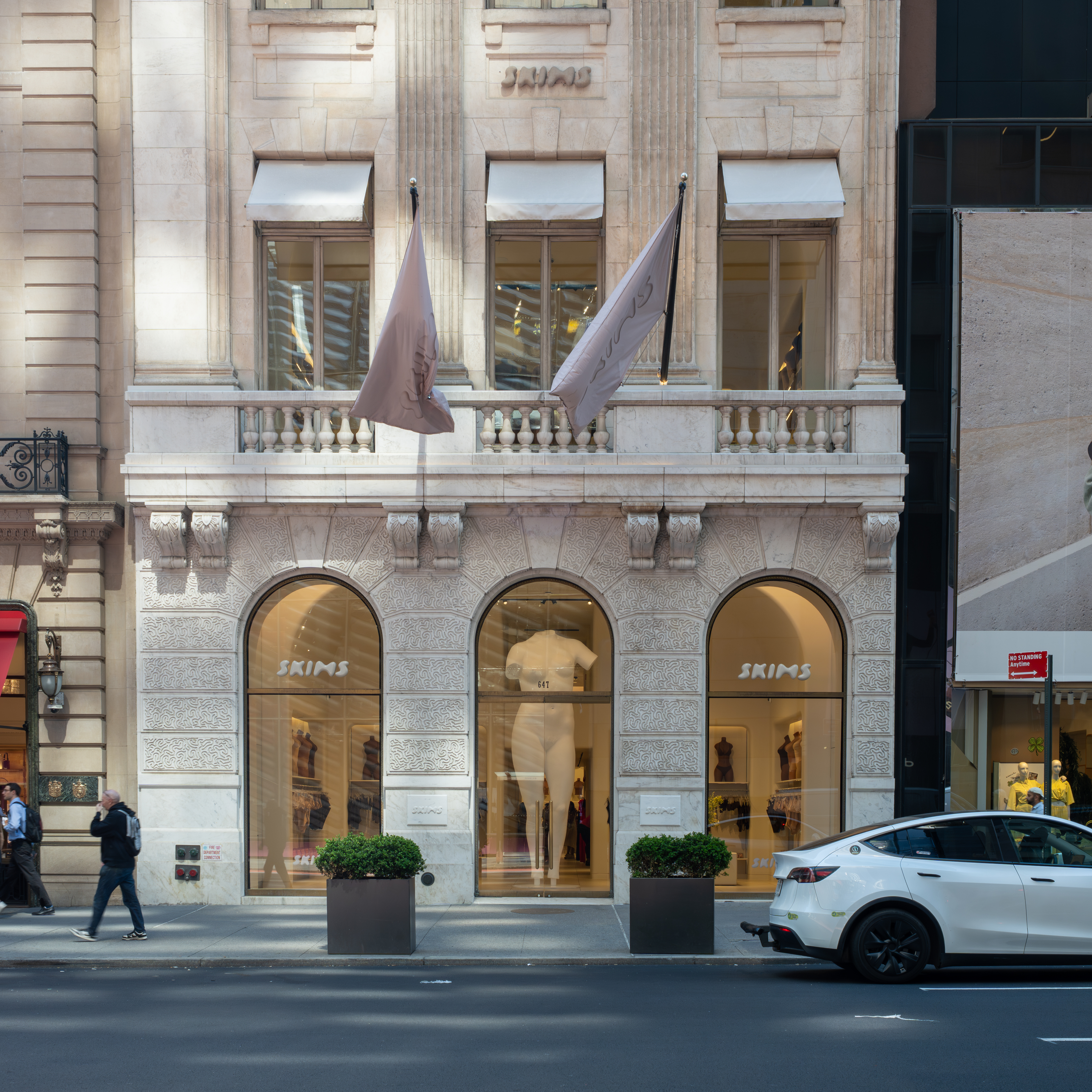
- Flagship in 647 Fifth Avenue in Midtown Manhattan
- Formerly: Kimono Intimates
- Type: Private
- Industry: Apparel
- Founded: June 2019; 7 years ago
- Founders: Kim Kardashian; Jens Grede
- Headquarters: Los Angeles, California, United States
- Area served: International
- Key people: Jens Grede (CEO)
- Products: Shapewear
- Website: skims.com

SKIMS is an American shapewear and clothing brand co-founded by Kim Kardashian and Jens Grede. The business was valued at over $5 billion as of 2025.

== History ==
The company was сo-founded in June 2019 by Swedish businessman and entrepreneur Jens Grede and American media personality and businesswoman Kim Kardashian. The company's founding partners are Kardashian, Grede, and British businesswoman and entrepreneur Emma Grede. Before becoming a founding partner in the company, Emma co-founded the denim company, Good American, with Kardashian's sister, Khloé.

Kardashian's then-husband Kanye West was credited as being her "Ghost Creative Director" and for creating the company's logo. Prior to creation of this line, Kardashian was inspired by her own creative work of altering clothes, stating she "[has been] designing shapewear for 15 years".

Skims' initial launch resulted in more than $2 million in profit and the company selling out of merchandise in 10 minutes. The company claims to have sold more than three million products in its first year in business.

In April 2021, the company was reported to be worth over $1.6 billion. After further investments, the valuation of Skims was reported at $3.2 billion in January 2022.

In March 2022, Skims appeared on TIME's List of 100 Most Influential Companies of the year 2022.

In October 2023, Skims announced the company's first venture into menswear with a collection of underwear, t-shirts, socks, and tank tops designed for men.

=== Naming controversy ===
The company was originally named Kimono Intimates, by Kardashian and Jens Grede. The company's initial name was criticized by critics which argued that it disrespected Japanese culture and ignored the significance behind the country's traditional outfit. The mayor of Kyoto, Daisaku Kadokawa, wrote to Kardashian asking her to reconsider the company name and trademark for Kimono. Later, Kardashian announced that she would change the company's name to Skims.

== Products ==
Skims produces clothes in sizes ranging from XXS to 5XL. The brand's shapewear was designed to accommodate different skin tones and comes in nine shades. In addition to shapewear, Skims has released an array of collections in loungewear, lingerie, and accessories, including bras, underwear, bodysuits, dresses, shorts, sweatpants, tops, hoodies, sweaters, and slides, and facial masks.

In 2026, Skims offered an $150 advent calendar, featuring twelve branded-items. The brand later offered refunds to customers who had purchased the calendar, in response to a backlash against the perceived quality of the contents.

=== Collaborations ===
In 2021, the company established a partnership with the United States Olympics team, providing Team USA with Skims-branded athleisure for its athletes. The athletes wore the clothing during the 2020 Summer Olympics and Paralympics in Tokyo, and at the 2022 Winter Olympics in Beijing.

In October 2021, the company collaborated with Italian fashion house Fendi, creating a capsule collection of FENDI x SKIMS branded shapewear, leather dresses, and swimsuits. The collaboration was inspired by a Fendi collection previously released in 1978 by Karl Lagerfeld. Bloomberg News reported that the collaboration generated an estimated US$3 million in sales within 10 minutes of its release.

In September 2023, the company and the National Basketball Association (NBA) announced a multiyear partnership in making Skims the official underwear partner of the NBA, the Women's National Basketball League (WNBA), and USA Basketball. As part of the partnership, Skims received media exposure across several league platforms, including on-court virtual signage during NBA and WNBA broadcasts, as well as on the leagues' official social and digital platforms. The company and its products were also highlighted at USA Basketball marquee events, including the USA Basketball Showcase, which features USA men's and women's national team exhibition games before major international competitions.

== Physical locations ==
Originally only available through the brand's official website, Skims is now able to be purchased on a variety of online websites and in-store at Nordstrom in the United States.

In 2024, the brand opened its first stand-alone store. As of 2026, Skims operates 27 stores across the world.

== Marketing ==
The company frequently utilizes influencer marketing by having celebrities and social media influencers wear their clothes. Kylie Jenner, Kendall Jenner, Kourtney Kardashian and Khloé Kardashian have been seen wearing Skims numerous times on social media and in Skims advertising campaigns. Other celebrities that have participated in Skims campaigns include Paris Hilton, Megan Fox, Kate Moss, Precious Lee, Kelsey Merritt, Candice Swanepoel, Heidi Klum, Tyra Banks, Alessandra Ambrosio, Rosalía, Paris Jackson, Becky G, Brooke Shields, Teyana Taylor, Iman Shumpert, Snoop Dogg, Chelsea Handler, SZA, PinkPantheress, Lana Del Rey, Ice Spice, Neymar, Nick Bosa, Sabrina Carpenter, Nelly Furtado, Charli XCX, Kim Cattrall, Lana Condor, Coco Jones, Hari Nef, Tate McRae, Rosé, and Nicola Coughlan.

== Financials ==
Skims' initial launch resulted in more than $2 million in profit and the company selling out of merchandise in 10 minutes. The company claims to have sold more than 3 million products in 2019, and as of 2024, generated around $1 billion in net sales.

The company's valuation has been estimated to be over $1.6 billion in April 2021, $3.2 billion in January 2022, $4 billion in July 2023, and $5 billion in November 2025.

== Awards ==
In 2021, founder Kim Kardashian was given a "Brand Innovator" award for her work on Skims by Wall Street Journal Magazine's Innovator Awards.

In November 2022, Skims received the inaugural "Innovation Award" presented by Amazon Fashion at the 2022 CFDA Fashion Awards. Cofounders Kim Kardashian, Emma Grede, and Jens Grede accepted the award at Casa Cipriani in Manhattan, New York.
