= Alexander Geringer =

Austrian journalist and publisher

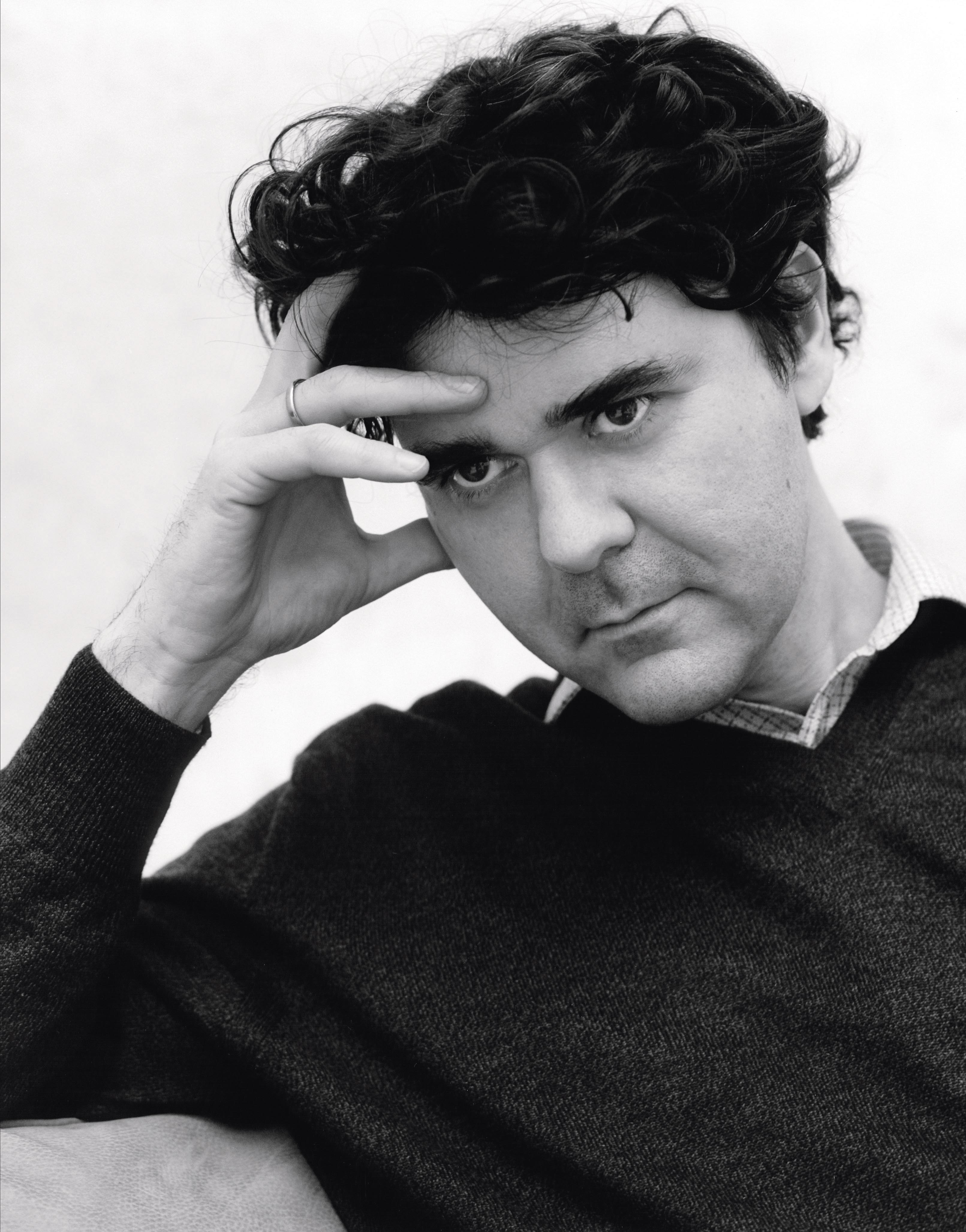
- Born: April 17, 1966 (age 60); Ottakring, Vienna, Austria
- Occupations: magazine publisher, creative director, journalist
- Known for: founder of Aheadmedia, co-founder of Wallpaper*, launched H.O.M.E. magazine in Germany, Austria and across CEE

Alexander Geringer (born April 17, 1966) is an Austrian journalist, creative director and magazine publisher. He is the founder and owner of Austrian magazine publishing house Ahead Media.

== Early years ==
Alexander Geringer was born and raised in the Ottakring district of Vienna, Austria. As a high school student at the municipal science-oriented upper school Bundesrealgymnasium Schuhmeierplatz (BRG XVI), he led his school’s team to victory at the Vienna High School Chess Tournament in 1979. He was also active in school politics and in 1983 as school spokesman joined the Vienna municipal school advisory council.

In 1982, Geringer co-organized with two other schools the first-ever music festival that was held on Vienna’s Danube Island. Held on June 19, 1982, some 3000 guests experienced the performances of local cult bands such as Chuzpe, Minisex, Rosachrom and Tom Pettings Herzattacken. The event set a precedent: a year later, the Austrian Social Democratic Party (SPÖ) hosted the first Danube Island festival (Donauinselfest), which now attracts millions.

== Early career ==
Geringer began his journalistic career in 1982 while still in high school at the Austrian Broadcasting Corporation (ORF) as a designer and radio moderator for programs such as ZickZack, Music Box and Radiothek. During this time, ZickZack was awarded the “Golden Microphone” issued by Hörzu magazine.

== Investigative Journalism ==
In 1984, he began studies in business administration at the Vienna University of Economics and Business, yet soon abandoned this to work as a freelance journalist for ORF as well as for various magazines. In 1985 he uncovered a scandal involving the illegal sale of aborted fetuses and brain tissue by the pathology departments of several Vienna hospitals. For years, the German pharmaceutical company B. Braun Melsungen had been purchasing brain tissue derived from corpses directly from department assistants. Working undercover, Geringer also succeeded in purchased brain tissue and aborted embryos. The breaking story was first published in the Austrian news magazine Ikarus, and a year later made the cover of the legendary German magazine Konkret. The scandal gained the attention of numerous European television stations and newspapers such as El País, Neue Zürcher Zeitung, Frankfurter Allgemeine, Der Spiegel. (The company was later involved in an even further-reaching scandal involving contaminated brain tissue used in one of its products, Lyodura.)

As an investigative journalist Geringer also reported on the Austrian company Intertrading and its links to international oil & arms trading in conjunction with the million-dollar financial and political scandal in which it was entangled. He also wrote investigative articles for the magazine Wiener, where he served as editor from 1986 to 1988.

== Magazine Publishing and Ahead Media ==
Geringer also made a name for himself as publishing manager and communications advisor for corporate customer magazines. In 1989 he co-founded the R&D publishing group together with Chris Radda and Andreas Dressler, and as associate member held a 20% share in the company. Here, he created and served as editor-in-chief of the fashion magazine DIVA and the men’s lifestyle magazine Ego.

In 1995 Geringer sold his stakes in the company and started his own boutique publishing house, Ahead Media. From his headquarters in Vienna, Geringer soon opened Ahead Media editorial offices in Berlin and satellite offices in London and New York. It was during this time that Geringer collaborated with Tyler Brûlé to create Wallpaper* magazine in 1996. Geringer served as its first publisher with Ahead Media as co-publisher. The first Wallpaper* issue was produced in Vienna at the Ahead Media offices and created by Ahead Media art director Herbert Winkler.

In the mid-2000s, Geringer opened further editorial offices in Budapest and Prague, and established Ahead Media as a one-stop-shop active in the creation of multilingual consumer magazines, contract publishing, creative services and image consulting.

As CEO of Ahead Media, Geringer realized a number of lifestyle design and fashion magazines including Ahead (lifestyle), IQstyle (youth), anyway (travel), and H.O.M.E. (design), which is now published not only in Germany and Austria but also in Central Eastern Europe in Czech, Hungary, Slovenia, Slovakia and Croatia. In 2014, H.O.M.E. launched a Russian language version for Russia, Kazakhstan and Ukraine, in cooperation with BurdaInternational / Hubert Burda Media. Together with his team, including Desirée Treichl-Stürgkh, Thomas Machhörndl and Gerhard Amann, Geringer also launched the design fair H.O.M.E.D.E.P.O.T, held annually in Vienna since 2000 and run by Thomas Machhörndl;.

In 2008 Geringer licensed the rights from Italian publisher Mondadori to produce the women’s fashion magazine flair in Austria as well as in CEE. Geringer later acquired the rights to publish flair in Germany, which had previously been with Klambt Media Group, and re-launched flair Germany in Fall 2013. Also in 2013, with an independent license for Germany, Austria and Switzerland, Geringer launched the German-language edition of the Italian architecture magazine domus.

In the role of creative director, Geringer also conceived several brand magazines for companies such as Silhouette, New Yorker, Stilwerk, Nespresso and Chopard.
