= Northwestern Mutual =

American financial services company

The Northwestern Mutual Life Insurance Company

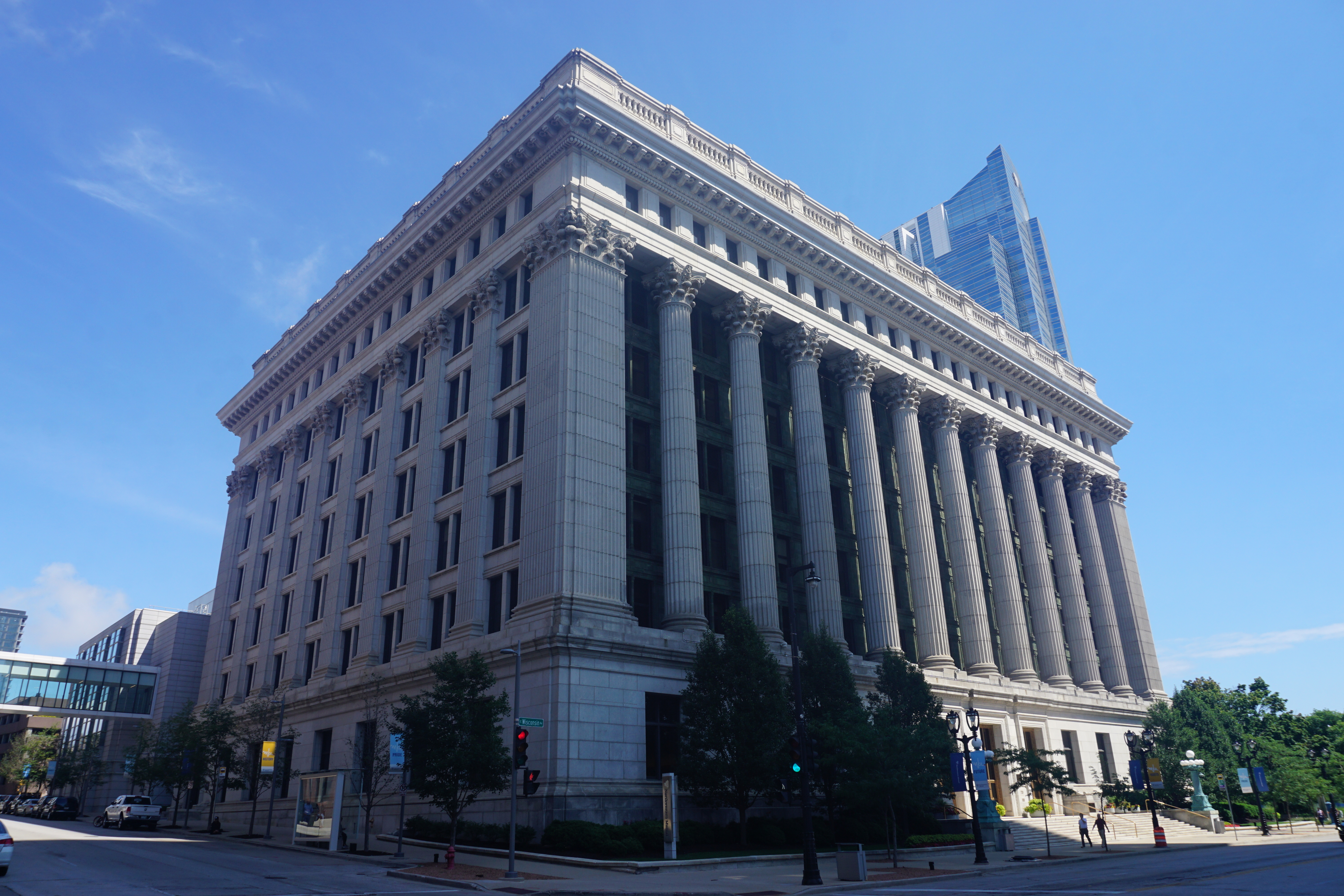
- Northwestern Mutual headquarters in Milwaukee
- Type: Private
- Industry: Financial services
- Founded: 1857; 169 years ago
- Headquarters: Milwaukee, Wisconsin, U.S.
- Key people: Tim Gerend (chairman, president and CEO); John C. Roberts (executive VP, Chief Field Officer)
- Products: Insurance and investments
- Revenue: ▲US$41.2 billion (2025)
- Net income: ▲US$497 million (2025)
- Number of employees: 8,290+ (2025)
- Website: northwesternmutual.com

Northwestern Mutual is an American financial services mutual organization headquartered in Milwaukee, Wisconsin. The financial security company provides consultation on wealth and asset income protection, education planning, retirement planning, investment advisory services, Financial Planning trust and private client services, estate planning and business planning. Its products include life insurance, permanent life insurance, disability income, and long-term care insurance; annuities; investments; and investment advisory products and services. Northwestern Mutual ranks No. 110 on the Fortune 500 list of the largest United States corporations by total revenue and is in the top 30 by assets held. The firm distributes a portion of its earnings to eligible policyholders as annual dividends. The hiring and sales policies and practices of Northwestern Mutual have attracted controversy.

== History ==
On March 2, 1857 (169 years ago), Northwestern Mutual was founded as the Mutual Life Insurance Company of the State of Wisconsin. Originally located in Janesville, Wisconsin, the fledgling company relocated to Milwaukee in 1859. Shortly after, the company experienced its first two death claims, when an excursion train traveling from Fond du Lac, Wisconsin, to Chicago, Illinois derailed, killing 14 people, two of whom were policy owners. With losses amounting to US$3,500 (equivalent to $125,000 in 2025), while the company possessed only US$2,000 in funds (equivalent to $72,000 in 2025), company president Samuel Daggett and Treasurer Charles Nash personally lent the money to pay the claims immediately, making up the difference of US$1,500 (equivalent to $54,000 in 2025).

In 1864, the company paid its first dividends to policy owners. It again paid dividends at three-year intervals, in 1867 and 1870, and two years later, as of 1872, started doing so annually.

By 1865, the company was operating throughout the Midwest and had entered the market along the East Coast, and the board of trustees changed the company's name to The Northwestern Mutual Life Insurance Company.

Throughout the early years of the 20th century, Northwestern Mutual Life Insurance Company focused on life insurance. At the same time, the company worked to increase its accountability. In 1907, company leaders invited policy owners who were not trustees to probe into finances for accountability. This practice has continued to the present day; members of the Policy owners’ Examining Committee have unrestricted access to evaluate Northwestern Mutual's operations, management and strategic plans independently.

In the mid-20th century, Northwestern Mutual Life Insurance Company invested in the iron and minerals industries on a large-scale basis, including the construction of a lake freighter, the first such investment by any American life insurance company. In 1958, the company launched the freighter SS Edmund Fitzgerald, named for longtime executive and newly elected company chairman Edmund Fitzgerald. At 729 feet (222 m) and 13,632 gross tons, the vessel was the largest ship on the Great Lakes for 13 years until 1971. The Edmund Fitzgerald sank on November 10, 1975, in Lake Superior, killing all 29 men aboard. The disaster was immortalized the next year by songwriter Gordon Lightfoot in "The Wreck of the Edmund Fitzgerald". The sinking led to changes in Great Lakes and national shipping regulations and practices that included mandatory survival suits, depth finders, positioning systems, increased freeboard, and more frequent inspection of vessels.

In 1969, the company began offering disability insurance. Less than a decade later, a series of retirement annuities were introduced for the employee benefits market. In the 1990s, the company saw further growth with the introduction of its long-term care insurance. In 2000, to reflect this broadening of its product offerings, the company changed its name again, shortening it to simply Northwestern Mutual.

By 2001, Northwestern Mutual was the leading individual life insurer in the United States, and in that year committed that it would not refuse life or disability insurance claims related to the September 11 attacks on the basis of an acts of war exclusion. Also that year, the company launched a wholly owned subsidiary known today as Northwestern Mutual Wealth Management Company (NMWMC), a federal savings bank and financial services provider.

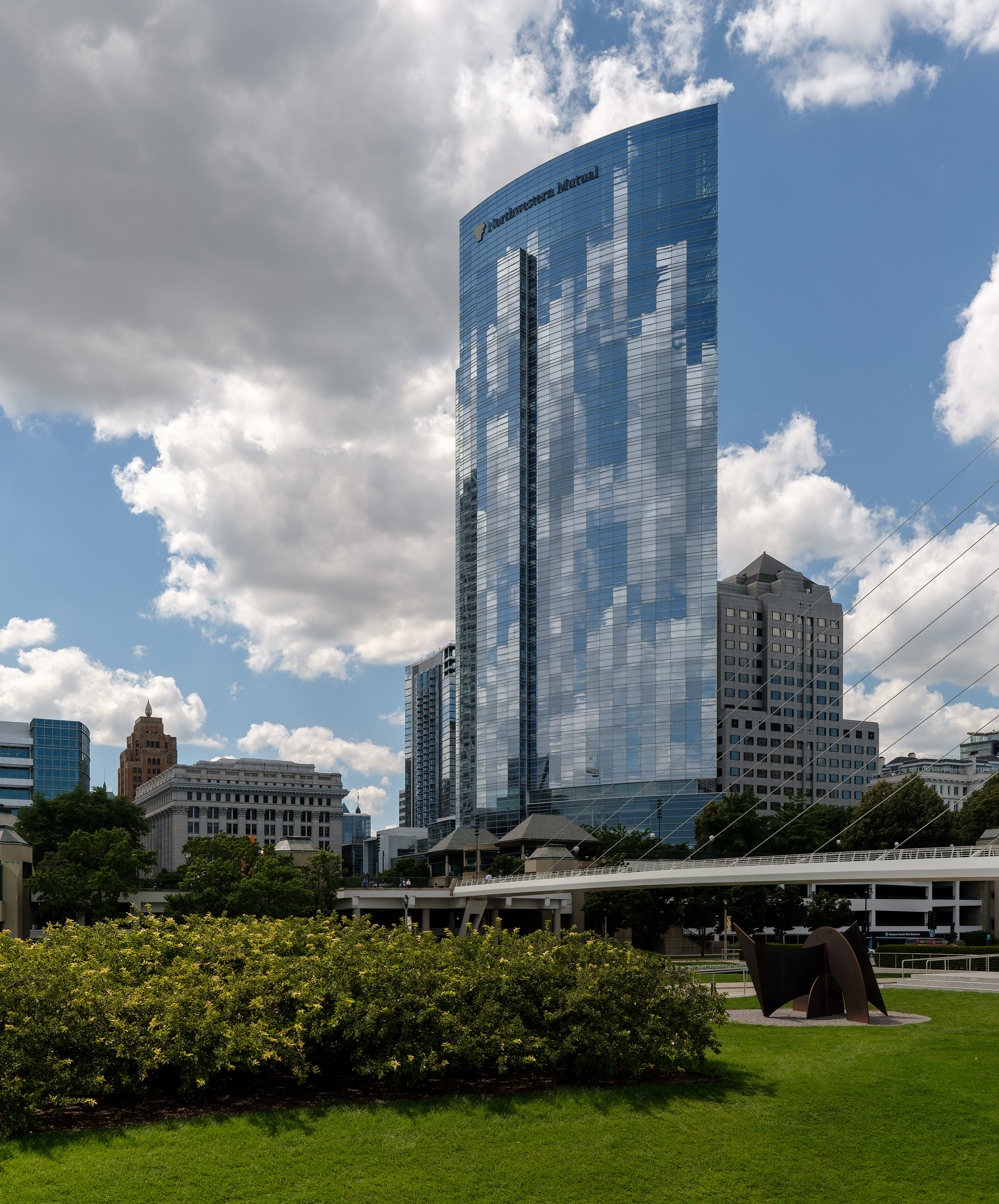
Northwestern Mutual Tower and Commons, Milwaukee

In 2015, Northwestern Mutual began construction of Northwestern Mutual Tower and Commons in downtown Milwaukee; the skyscraper opened in 2017.

Additionally, in 2015, Northwestern Mutual bought financial planning company LearnVest for over $250 million. In 2018, Northwestern Mutual reduced underwriting time and introduced an online digital platform for clients. From 2015 to 2020, Northwestern Mutual served as the presenting sponsor of the Rose Bowl Game, an NCAA Division I college football bowl game played annually on New Year's Day.

As of 2021, the company has $308.8 billion in assets, $31.1 billion in revenues, and $2 trillion worth of active life insurance protection. Through its wealth management and investment services businesses, the company manages $200 billion of investments owned by its 4.75 million clients.

== Subsidiaries ==
The company's services and products are offered through several subsidiaries:

- Mason Street Advisors is an SEC-registered investment advisor for Northwestern Mutual Series Fund variable annuity and variable life products.
- Northwestern Long Term Care Insurance Company offers Northwestern Mutual's long-term care insurance.
- Northwestern Mutual Investment Management Company manages Northwestern Mutual's investments in public and private debt, private equity and real estate.
- Northwestern Mutual Investment Services is the company's broker-dealer, which is also a registered investment advisor and member FINRA and SIPC.
- Northwestern Mutual Wealth Management Company provides financial planning, investment advisory and trust services, and is a federal savings bank.

== Investment and research ==
Since launching in 2017, Northwestern Mutual Future Ventures, Northwestern Mutual's venture capital arm, has invested more than $50 million in 18 tech startups. In 2019, the company partnered with Accenture, Advocate Aurora Health, Johnson Controls, Kohl's and Rockwell Automation to form the MKE Tech Hub Coalition, an effort focused on attracting and retaining tech talent in the Milwaukee region. In June 2020, Northwestern Mutual also reported a $1.6 million pledge to All-In Milwaukee to finance the latest Talent of the Future initiative over the next four years, through its Foundation and in collaboration with the Diversity and Inclusion department.

Northwestern Mutual regularly publishes research examining U.S. adults’ attitudes and behaviors toward money, financial decision-making and caregiving.

== Financial ratings and awards ==
Northwestern Mutual has the highest financial strength ratings currently awarded to U.S. life insurers by all of the major rating agencies.

Northwestern Mutual was ranked No. 368 among America's Best Employers 2021 by Forbes.

== Controversies ==
In 2015, claims were brought against Northwestern Mutual for illegally changing how it calculated dividends on deferred, fixed annuities, reducing yearly payouts to 4000 current and 29,000 former annuity owners. The change had been made in 1985. Northwestern agreed to pay $84 million to settle the lawsuit.

In 2023, authorities in New Hampshire investigated multiple Northwestern Mutual brokers based at Northwestern Mutual Northern New England based in Manchester, New Hampshire. The brokers were accused of misleading marketing practices, and Managing Partner Scott Christensen was investigated by the New Hampshire Bureau of Securities Regulation and FINRA for failing to properly supervise the brokers in his office. At least one employee was found to have asked an acquaintance to make client calls despite having no financial licensure and no status as an employee or contractor with Northwestern Mutual. Another employee was permitted by the company to resign while being investigated internally for sending unauthorized client emails. Northwestern Mutual settled the case for $400,000.

In a 2025 Guardian investigation, Northwestern Mutual was accused of manipulating interns to make aggressive sales pitches for expensive and unneeded whole life insurance policies to their personal contacts, with a fee-paying structure that often leaves interns in financial debt or effectively earning less than minimum wage. The recruitment of interns are said to be a methodology to mine them for the names of potential sales contacts, with a substantial likelihood that the intern will get little in return. The article also suggests that the inappropriate use of the cover of sales personnel being a "financial planner", when this is not strictly accurate, is used to entice customers into buying the whole life insurance, which will give them a poor return compared to other investments.

On November 20, 2025, the U.S. Equal Employment Opportunity Commission (EEOC) announced that it was asking a federal court to compel Northwestern Mutual to disclose details about its diversity, equity, and inclusion (DEI) policies, pursuant to an administrative subpoena the agency had issued. The EEOC issued the subpoena as part of its investigation into claims by a Northwestern Mutual employee who alleged that he and other white male employees were denied promotion opportunities because of the company's alleged “illegal” DEI policy. Alleging Title VII discrimination, the employee asserts that the employer's DEI practices provided “additional support and opportunities for women and people of color” and that the company adopted metrics encouraging the promotion of those groups. He contends that these practices resulted in discrimination against him based on his “race (White), sex (male), color, and national origin (American-Irish).” He also alleges that he was retaliated against for raising concerns about the DEI policy and its effect on advancement.

== See also ==
- List of tallest buildings in Milwaukee
