= LoveShackFancy =

American clothing brand

LoveShackFancy is an American clothing brand. It sells women's and girls apparel as well as home décor. It was founded by Rebecca Hessel Cohen in 2013.

LoveShackFancy opened its first boutique in Sag Harbor in 2018. Following this, the company expanded into Manhattan, with notable boutiques in the West Village and on Madison Avenue in the Upper East Side. The flagship SoHo store opened in October 2025.
