= Aurora James =

Canadian creative director, activist, poet and fashion designer

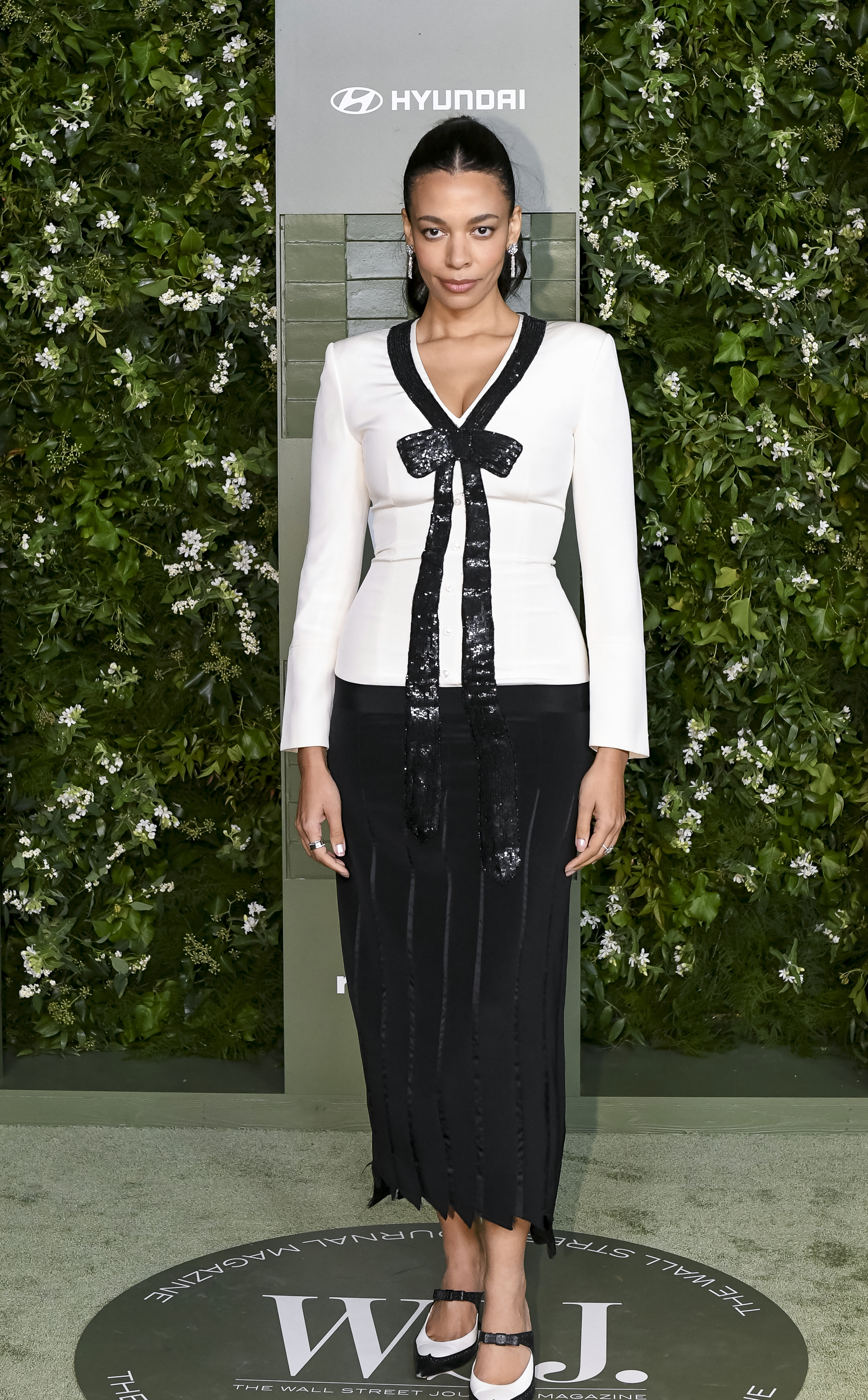
- Born: July 12, 1984 (age 42); Guelph, Ontario, Canada
- Known for: Fashion design
- Notable work: 15 Percent Pledge
- Awards: 2020 The Bloomberg 50; 2021 Time 100
- Website: brothervellies.com

Aurora James (born on July 12, 1984) is a Canadian fashion designer and businesswoman. She is well-known for her work in sustainable fashion and for starting the organization 15 Percent Pledge, which promotes greater representation of Black-owned companies in retail. She is the creator of the fashion brand Brother Vellies, which supports artisan communities and encourages traditional African design techniques. James has become well-known for fusing fashion with social effect, especially when it comes to promoting DEIB (diversity, equity, inclusion, and belonging) in the retail sector.

== Early life ==
James was born to a Ghanaian father and a Canadian mother in Guelph, Ontario, Canada. Her childhood was split between Canada and Jamaica. In 2010, James relocated to Los Angeles and later to New York City.

== Career and brand ==
After traveling across Africa in 2011, James spent the next few years experimenting with design, testing designs at local markets in New York and working with various artisan groups. She launched Brother Vellies in January 2013, started with $3,500 in savings, with a goal of promoting the work of African artisans. The first formal Brother Vellies collection was produced for the spring 2014 season and was created entirely with shoemakers in South Africa. James later expanded to working in other countries within Africa and beyond, including Mexico and Honduras, to continue producing desert boots, shoes, slippers, and sandals.

In 2015, James began producing handbags for Brother Vellies, the same year she won the CFDA/Vogue Fashion Fund prize.

In 2020, James was featured on the cover of the September issue of Vogue magazine, in a portrait by Jordan Casteel.

In 2021 after James' dress with a message "Tax the Rich” across the back in big red lettering was worn by Alexandria Ocasio-Cortez at the 2021 Met Gala several news outlets reported on the tax debt of James' company, totaling six figures, along with multiple warrants issued across various states. These reports ignited controversy and accusations of hypocrisy regarding James' political stance.

In 2022, she was unanimously elected as a Vice Chair of the CFDA.

In 2023, James was presented the Honorary Clio Award.

Brother Vellies has been worn by activists, celebrities, artists and musicians, including Beyoncé, Solange Knowles, Nicki Minaj, and Elaine Welteroth.

James started experimenting with design and collaborating with artisan groups in 2011 after touring throughout Africa. She started the fashion company Brother Vellies in 2013 with an emphasis on ethical and sustainable production. The company was founded with the intention of protecting indigenous African design methods and giving craftspeople financial opportunity.

Brother Vellies uses ancient techniques and locally available materials to create handcrafted items, such as handbags and shoes. The company first collaborated with South African shoemakers before extending production to Ethiopia, Kenya, Mexico, and Haiti. By using this methodology, James aimed to promote ecologically conscious fashion techniques while addressing the underrepresentation and lack of support for artisan groups.

== The 15 Percent Pledge ==
In 2020, in the wake of the murder of George Floyd and the wave of Black Lives Matter activism that followed, James launched an initiative called the 15 Percent Pledge, with an Instagram post on May 29 that Vogue writes "immediately went viral and resulted in an outpouring of interest." The 15 Percent Pledge Foundation was then created as a non-profit organization to urge major retailers to commit 15 percent of their shelf-space to Black-owned businesses. The foundation offers large corporations accountability and strategy suggestions as well as consulting services. The goal of the foundation is to advocate on behalf of Black-owned businesses and to build generational wealth in Black communities; according to its website, the initiative "was born from seeing multiple acts of social injustice and police brutality in the United States, with a lack of corporate accountability for the systemic issues at play."

Time magazine writes that James wanted to "find a way that companies could make a tangible change", and "from there, the 15 Percent Pledge was born." Cam Wolf writes in GQ magazine that "James is careful to note that the 15 Percent Pledge is not the only solution", and that James said, "This is a really tough time for everyone, and people shopping is by no means going to ease the pain of the lives that we have lost ... There are also a lot of other things that we need people to be doing, like donating to bail funds."

== Memoir ==
In May 2023, James' memoir Wildflower was released. According to a review in Kirkus Reviews, "Throughout the text, James is vulnerable and frank, cultivating a narrative voice that is both intimate and captivating; on the line level, her language is impressively lyrical." The review also called Wildflower, "A well-written, profoundly empathetic memoir from an entrepreneur with a very bright future."

Bianca Betancourt writes in Harper's Bazaar, "James doesn't hold back. She movingly intertwines memories of her youth with deeply honest accounts of the life she leads today as a designer and entrepreneur."

Cat Woods writes in Observer, "While reading Wildflower, it can sometimes be hard to see how James conjured up the resolve and determination to carry on in an industry notoriously defined by privilege, exploitation and savage competition." In Fashionista, Andrea Bossi writes, "Sure, a fashion lover can appreciate how James takes the reader through learning about the footwear trade, but the book speaks to a broader audience. Specifically, it appeals to anyone who has ever questioned their path and purpose, especially women and women of color."

Impact and recognition

James has been acknowledged for her efforts to diversity and sustainability in the fashion industry in addition to her work as a designer and businesswoman. Her work has garnered media attention and industry acclaim, underscoring her dual roles as a social innovator and commercial leader.

Her wider role in promoting structural change in retail is seen in the ongoing growth of the 15 Percent Pledge. James has been instrumental in changing discussions about diversity in fashion and retail by addressing representation gaps and encouraging moral behavior.

== Awards and honors ==
- 2015 CFDA/Vogue Fashion Fund – Winner
- 2016 Inductee to the Council of Fashion Designers of America (CFDA)
- 2016 CFDA Awards, Swarovski Award for Accessory Design – Nominee
- 2016 Vogue Talents Award – Winner
- 2016-2018 CFDA Fashion Incubator Member
- 2018 CFDA Awards, Swarovski Award for Emerging Talent – Nominee
- 2019 Planned Parenthood Influencer Award
- 2019 CAFA Award: International Canadian Designer Award – Winner
- 2019, Crain's New York Business 40 Under 40
- 2020 British Fashion Award, People
- 2020 The Bloomberg 50
- 2020 Footwear News Person of the Year
- 2021 Time 100, Time's annual list of the 100 most influential people in the world
- 2021 Founder's Award at the CFDA Awards
- 2022 Glamour Woman of the Year
- 2022 Vice Chair of the CFDA
- 2023 CAFA Vanguard Award
