= LearnVest =

Defunct American financial planning company from 2009-2018

LearnVest Inc.
- Type: Subsidiary
- Industry: Personal finance, Software
- Founded: 2009
- Founder: Alexa von Tobel
- Defunct: 2018
- Headquarters: New York, New York, United States
- Area served: United States
- Revenue: N/A
- Parent: Northwestern Mutual Life
- Website: LearnVest.com

LearnVest was an American financial planning company founded by CEO Alexa von Tobel. It sold personal finance software.

== History ==
Alexa von Tobel entered Harvard Business School in the fall of 2008, but took a leave of absence and launched LearnVest. Her inspiration for LearnVest started while she was a senior at Harvard University in 2006.

LearnVest's headquarters are in New York, and they have an Expert Hub in Phoenix. LearnVest was selected as a TechCrunch50 2009 Company and debuted in September 2009 at the TechCrunch50 conference in San Francisco.

On March 25, 2015, Northwestern Mutual Life Insurance Co., based in Milwaukee, announced it would acquire LearnVest. Financial terms of the deal weren’t disclosed. LearnVest will continue to operate as a separate unit under founder and Chief Executive von Tobel. The deal has been viewed as the latest attempt by traditional financial services firms to adapt to new digital technologies. Northwestern Mutual expects the technology will encourage more adviser-client interaction and ultimately create a more rewarding experience for the customer and adviser. By adding LearnVest’s technology to the insurer’s existing planning platform, those advisers can devote more time to working with customers on carrying out their recommendations. The arrangement also puts customers in more frequent contact with those advisers.

On May 3, 2018, LearnVest discontinued its financial planning offering for consumers, as well as its LearnVest@Work program for businesses.

== Services ==
The LearnVest Program focuses on behavior change and “takes you from cutting expenses to budgeting for goals to investing your money.” Clients work with LearnVest Planners to make progress on their money. There are “three tiers of access to financial plans” The LearnVest Program was featured in von Tobel’s New York Times Bestseller, Financially Fearless.

=== Money Center Tool ===
The Money Center is an online tool that lets users track their spending, visualize their budgets and financial goals. In addition to the built-in budgeting system, full goal tracking, full trends and analysis, and a financial inbox, Money Center allows live co-viewing of user’s account and dashboard between the user and his or her LearnVest financial planner.

=== LearnVest Planning ===
LearnVest Planning, a subsidiary of LearnVest Inc., is a Registered Investment Advisor through which LearnVest employs Certified Financial Planners nationwide. As a registered SEC financial advisor, LearnVest is able to offer portfolio recommendations and general investment advice.

=== iPhone and iPad apps ===
LearnVest released free iPhone and iPad apps that help users track their spending and their financial goals. The LearnVest app was featured as an iTunes App Store New & Noteworthy pick.

== Investment and finances ==
LearnVest raised a $4.5 million Series A round, a $19 million Series B round, a $16.5 million Series C round, and a $28 million Series D round.

Investors include Accel Partners, Northwestern Mutual, American Express Ventures, Claritas Capital, Ed Mathias of The Carlyle Group, and Todd Ruppert of T. Rowe Price.

== Events ==
The company hosted its first live event, LearnVest LIVE, in New York City in October 2012, featuring lectures by fashion designer Cynthia Rowley, Cosmo editor and Project Runway mentor Joanna Coles, Top Chef judge Gail Simmons and Gilt Groupe cofounder Alexandra Wilkis Wilson. LearnVest has since held LIVE events in Los Angeles, Boston and San Francisco. In 2014, LearnVest CEO Alexa von Tobel kicked off a 20-city book tour for Financially Fearless. The book tour focused on going across the country to help people make progress on their money.

== Press and awards ==
- TechCrunch50 2009
- Forbes's Top 100 Websites for Women
- Business Insider's Digital 100 List
- Time Magazine's annual list of 50 Best Websites
- FinovateFall Best of Show 2011, 2012, 2013
- Most Influential Content 2014
