= Tyler Brûlé =

Canadian journalist and magazine editor

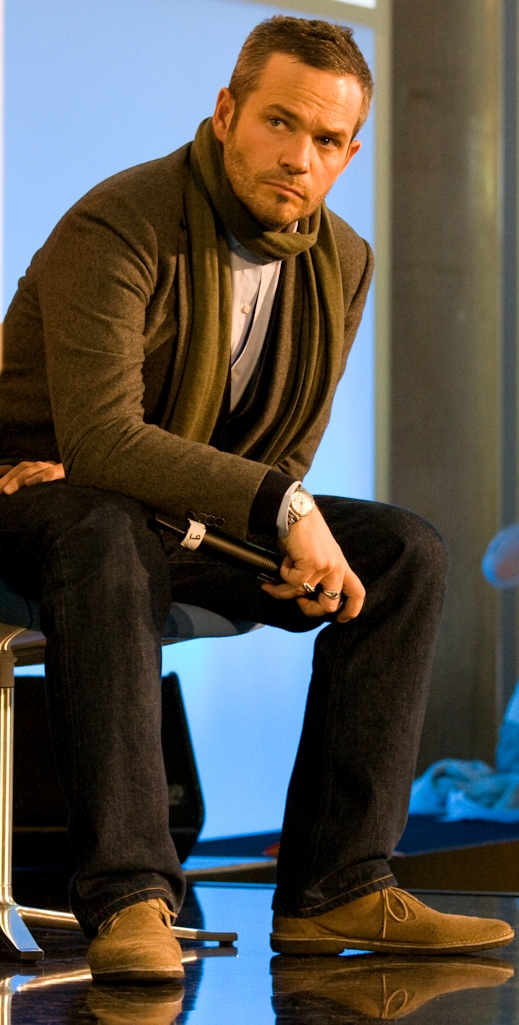
- Born: 25 November 1968 (age 57); Winnipeg, Manitoba, Canada
- Citizenship: Canada, Estonia, United Kingdom
- Occupation: Journalist
- Known for: Launching Wallpaper* & Winkreative & Monocle magazines. "Fast Lane" column in the Financial Times newspaper.

Jayson Tyler Brûlé (born 25 November 1968) is a journalist, entrepreneur, and magazine publisher. He is the editorial director of Monocle. He is a citizen of Canada, Estonia and the United Kingdom and resides in Switzerland.

== Early life ==
Jayson Tyler Brûlé is the only child of Canadian football player Paul Brule, (Note: Brûlé's father does not appear to have used any diacritical marks or accents on the family surname.) and Virge Brule, an Estonian artist. Brûlé moved to Toronto to attend Ryerson Polytechnical Institute, but did not graduate. Tyler also attended Humberside Collegiate Institute. He moved to the United Kingdom in 1989 and trained as a journalist with the BBC. During this time, he subsequently wrote for numerous British press, including The Guardian, Stern, The Sunday Times and Vanity Fair.

== Magazine ventures and design work ==
In 1996, Brûlé took out a small business loan and launched Wallpaper, a style and fashion magazine which was one of the most influential launches of the 1990s. Time Inc bought it for £1m in 1997, and kept Brûlé on as editorial director. During this time at Wallpaper, Brûlé focused his attention on a branding and advertising agency he'd started, called Winkreative, which he still runs and whose clients included American Express, Porter Airlines, British Airways, BlackBerry and Sky News.

In 2001, he became the youngest ever recipient of the British Society of Magazine Editors' Lifetime Achievement Award. That year he and Winkreative were hired to design the "look and feel" of Swiss International Air Lines at their relaunch, after the collapse of Swissair.

In May 2002, Brûlé left Wallpaper and concentrated on Winkreative.

In 2005, Brûlé hosted the TV media magazine The Desk on BBC Four. In 2006, he co-produced Counter Culture, a documentary series about cultural aspects of shopping, on the same channel.

In 2007, Brûlé launched Monocle magazine, where he is the current Editor-in-Chief.

== Journalistic work ==
In March 1994, Brûlé was shot twice by a sniper in an ambush in Kabul while covering the Afghanistan war for German news magazine, Focus. Brûlé lost partial use of his left hand resulting in a long hospital stay, during which he read many home-design and cooking magazines.

Brûlé was a columnist for the Financial Times, and has also written for the International Herald Tribune, The New York Times, and Neue Zürcher Zeitung am Sonntag. His "Fast Lane" column – written for the weekend edition of the Financial Times – covered his observations on travel, international design trends, and high-end consumer goods.

Brûlé left his "Fast Lane" column at the Financial Times in 2006 to focus on launching Monocle magazine, which debuted in February 2007. He subsequently wrote a column on urbanism and global navigation for the International Herald Tribune before returning to the Financial Times in April 2008. However, in 2008, Brûlé left the International Herald Tribune to revive his weekly "Fast Lane" column for the newly relaunched Financial Times weekend edition. Brûlé left the Financial Times in November 2017, after the Press Gazette published allegations that he had been namedropping former clients of his creative agency in his column.

He served on Dopplr's board of directors, until Dopplr was sold to Nokia in September 2009.

== Monocle ==
In October 2006, Brûlé announced that he would create a new magazine, to be called Monocle, which launched 14 February 2007. Brûlé later stated "Monocle is the media project I always wanted to do".
