= Frame (fashion brand) =

American fashion retail company

FRAME, Inc.
- Company type: Private
- Industry: Apparel
- Founded: 2012; 14 years ago
- Founders: Jens Grede; Erik Torstensson; Josh Levine; Nico Peyrache
- Headquarters: Los Angeles, California, United States
- Area served: International
- Key people: Nicolas Dreyfus (CEO)
- Products: Denim, men and woman's fashion
- Website: frame-store.com

Frame (stylized as FRAME) is an American fashion retail company that designs and sells clothing for men and women. Established in 2012 by Erik Torstensson and Jens Grede, Frame offers a range of ready-to-wear garments. Frame is sold in 16 brick-and-mortar locations in North America, two in London, two in China, and department stores including Bloomingdales.

== History ==
Frame was founded in 2012 by Swedish entrepreneurs Erik Torstensson and Jens Grede following careers at creative agency, The Saturday Group, in which the founders sold a majority stake to Omnicom in 2015.

Frame's first product, the "Le Skinny de Jeanne", was first worn by actors and supermodels including Miranda Kerr, Poppy Delevingne, Lily Aldridge, Kate Bosworth, and Karlie Kloss. The company's first bag, a leather tote called “Les Second,” was modeled by Sienna Miller, Katie Holmes, Alessandra Ambrosio, and Doutzen Kroes.

In 2014 and 2018, Frame founders Erik Torstensson and Jens Grede were named to Business of Fashion's BoF 500 list of people shaping the global fashion industry. According to The Sourcing Journal, Frame earned over $130 million in revenue in 2018. As of 2021 the company owns and operates sixteen stores in Austin, Aspen, Boston, Dallas, Greenwich, Houston, Los Angeles, London, New York, and San Francisco. Its brand collaborations include Imaan Hammam, Mejuri, the Carlyle Hotel, and Jordan Barrett.
