= Wallpaper (magazine) =

British design magazine

Wallpaper*

- Cover of the December 2024 issue
- Editor-in-Chief: Bill Prince
- Categories: Cultural
- Frequency: Monthly
- Circulation: 100,460 Print edition
- Founded: 1996
- Company: Future plc
- Country: United Kingdom
- Based in: London
- Language: English
- Website: wallpaper.com

Wallpaper, stylised Wallpaper*, is a British monthly publication focusing on design and architecture, fashion, travel, art, and lifestyle. Founded in London in 1996, the magazine is currently owned by Future plc following its acquisition of TI Media.

== Founding and ownership ==
The magazine was launched in London in 1996 by Canadian journalist Tyler Brûlé and Austrian journalist Alexander Geringer. Brûlé sold the magazine to Time Warner in 1997 and stayed on as editorial director until 2002, when he was replaced by Jeremy Langmead.

== Editorial leadership ==
In 2003 Langmead appointed Tony Chambers as creative director. Chambers, a self-styled "visual journalist", replaced Langmead as editor-in-chief in April 2007. In September 2017, Chambers was succeeded by the publication's creative director, Sarah Douglas. Douglas had worked at the magazine for over a decade, joining as art editor in 2007 before being appointed to creative director in 2012. Chambers, in turn, took on the role of Wallpaper* brand and content director. In 2023, Bill Prince was appointed editor-in-chief.

== Business expansion ==
Apart from publishing the monthly magazine and website, under the banner of its Bespoke business, Wallpaper* also creates content, curates exhibitions and designs events for third-party clients. Wallpaper* published over 100 travel city guide books in partnership with Phaidon Press.

== Digital development ==
Wallpaper.com publishes news, features, interviews, galleries and a daily newsletter.

In August 2008, Wallpaper* launched the Wallpaper* Selects website with online retailer Eyestorm. Wallpaper* Selects sells limited-edition photographs from the Wallpaper* archive, signed by the photographer.

In July 2011, the magazine launched an iPad edition. During the COVID-19 pandemic, the magazine was available as a free digital download.

In 2015, Wallpaper* launched the WallpaperSTORE*, an e-commerce platform selling products featured in the magazine.

== Special projects and milestones ==
The annual Wallpaper* Design Awards were launched in January 2005.

In 2007, the logo's asterisk was redesigned with a cursor in place of one of its arms. Beginning that year, the magazine invited guest editors for its October issue. Guest editors have included Jeff Koons (2007), Zaha Hadid (2008), Karl Lagerfeld (2009), David Lynch (2010), Kraftwerk (2011), Ole Scheeren (2012), Elmgreen & Dragset (2013), Frank Gehry (2014), William Wegman (2015), Jenny Holzer (2019), Giorgio Armani (2022) and Yayoi Kusama (2023).

From 2009 to 2012, Wallpaper* released special editions focused on the BRIC nations: Made in China (June 2009), Born in Brazil (June 2010), Reborn in India (June 2011) and Reigning in Russia (November 2012).

From 2010 to 2019, the Wallpaper* Handmade exhibition was held annually at the Milan Salone del Mobile.

Wallpaper* published its 200th issue in October 2015. In 2017, a Chinese-language edition launched, published by Huasheng Media.

In 2024, Wallpaper* partnered with Rolex to publish a history of the Rolex Submariner.

== Controversies ==
In September 2005, the magazine published an article about the Afrikaans Language Monument by Bronwyn Davies, an English-speaking South African, that described Afrikaans as "one of the world's ugliest languages". South African billionaire Johann Rupert (chairman of the Richemont Group), responded by withdrawing advertising for all Richemont Group brands, such as Cartier, Van Cleef & Arpels, Montblanc and Alfred Dunhill, from the magazine.
